= 2026 Johor state election =

General election for the 16th Johor State Legislative Assembly

- 11 July 2026

56 of 61 seats in the Legislative Assembly 29 seats needed for a majority
- Registered: 2,727,926 (▲7.38%)
- Turnout: 69.57% (▲14.65%)
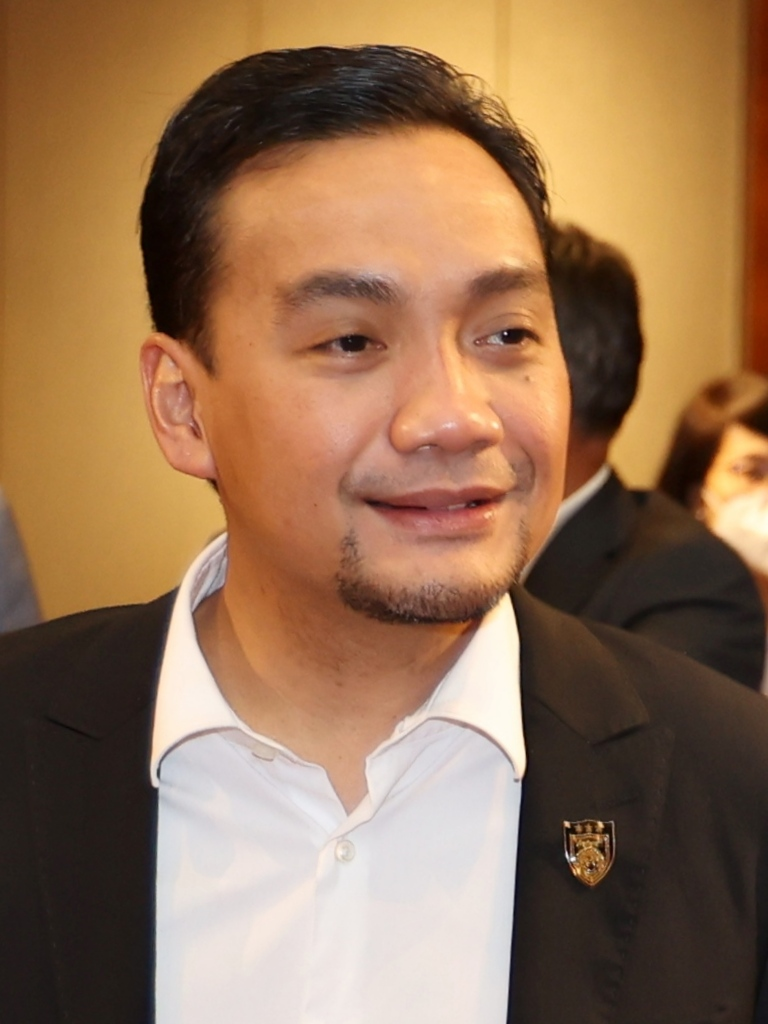

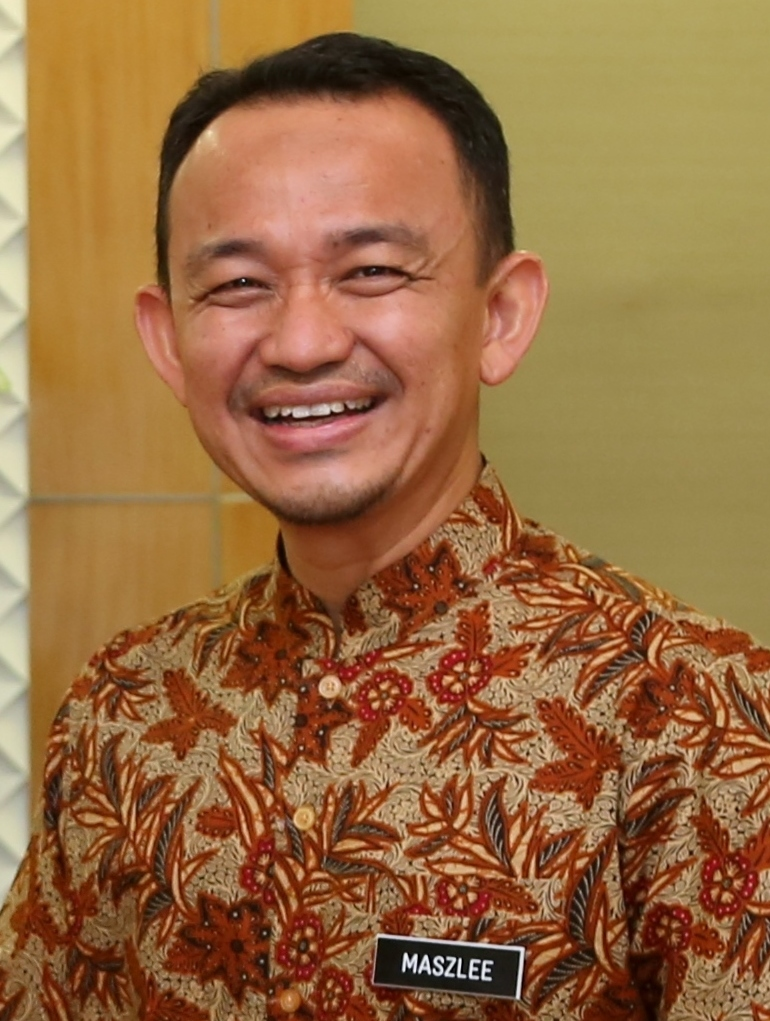
	Majority party	Minority party	Third party
			PN
Leader	Onn Hafiz Ghazi	Maszlee Malik	Sahruddin Jamal
Party	UMNO	PKR	BERSATU
Alliance	BN	PH	PN
Leader since	15 March 2022	22 June 2026	16 May 2026 (Note: Sahruddin resigned as Johor PN chairman on 30 December 2025, but was reappointed on 16 May 2026.)
Leader's seat	Machap	Puteri Wangsa (Note: Contested and won as a non-incumbent.)	Bukit Kepong (lost seat)
Last election	40 seats, 43.11%	12 seats, 26.42%	3 seats, 25.38% (Note: Includes the total vote share of PEJUANG, which joined PN in 2026. The actual seats and vote share of Perikatan Nasional in the last election were 3 seats, 24.04% respectively.)
Seats before	40	12	3
Seats won	48	8	0
Seat change	▲8	▼4	▼3
Popular vote	1,118,559	611,983	102,090
Percentage	59.66%	32.64%	5.45%
Swing	▲16.55 pp	▲6.22 pp	▼19.93 pp
- Results by constituency
Menteri Besar before election
Onn Hafiz Ghazi
BN–UMNO
Elected Menteri Besar
Onn Hafiz Ghazi
BN–UMNO

The 2026 Johor state election took place on 11 July 2026 to elect 56 members of the 16th Johor State Legislative Assembly. The dissolution was announced by incumbent Menteri Besar Onn Hafiz Ghazi on 1 June 2026, signed by the Regent of Johor, with the consent of the King of Malaysia and Sultan of Johor Sultan Ibrahim Iskandar.

Improving on its previous election showing, Barisan Nasional (BN) secured a landslide win with 48 seats, marking its best performance since 2008 and retaining its supermajority. The coalition made significant gains by flipping seats that had been held by Pakatan Harapan (PH) for more than a term (won between the period of 2013 and 2022 consecutively prior to defeat), namely Jementah, Tangkak, Johor Jaya, Perling (formerly known as Pengkalan Rinting) and Bukit Batu. PH faced severe losses, winning just 8 seats but gained the seat of Puteri Wangsa back from the Malaysian United Democratic Alliance (MUDA). Perikatan Nasional (PN) suffered a wipeout, losing all seats in the state assembly, with state PN chairman and former Menteri Besar Sahruddin Jamal losing his seat of Bukit Kepong, while PAS did not have any representation in the state assembly for the first time since 2004, the latter losing its sole stronghold seat of Maharani to UMNO (BN), in which it held between 2008-2018 and since 2022.

Following the results of the election, analysts highlighted on the continued decline of non-Malay support for PH as contributing factors to BN's victory, with component parties the Malaysian Chinese Association (MCA) and the Malaysian Indian Congress (MIC) winning up to 8 and 4 seats respectively. Analysts commented that the slow pace and poor performance of national reforms under the PH-led federal government have caused discontent among many Chinese and Indian voters, who were once reliable support bases for PH, towards the coalition and particularly the Democratic Action Party (DAP). The collapse of non-Malay support had also caused devastating losses for DAP at the 2025 Sabah state election, which led to the party losing all contested seats.

== Constituencies ==
Electoral map of Johor, showing all 56 constituencies

== Composition before dissolution ==
BN			PH			PN		MUDA
40			12			3		1
33	4	3	10	1	1	2	1	1
UMNO	MCA	MIC	DAP	PKR	AMANAH	BERSATU	PAS	MUDA

== Background ==
=== Previous election ===
The previous state election was held on 12 March 2022 following the dissolution of the 15th State Legislative Assembly. Barisan Nasional won a two-thirds supermajority, securing 40 of 56 seats.

== Electoral system ==
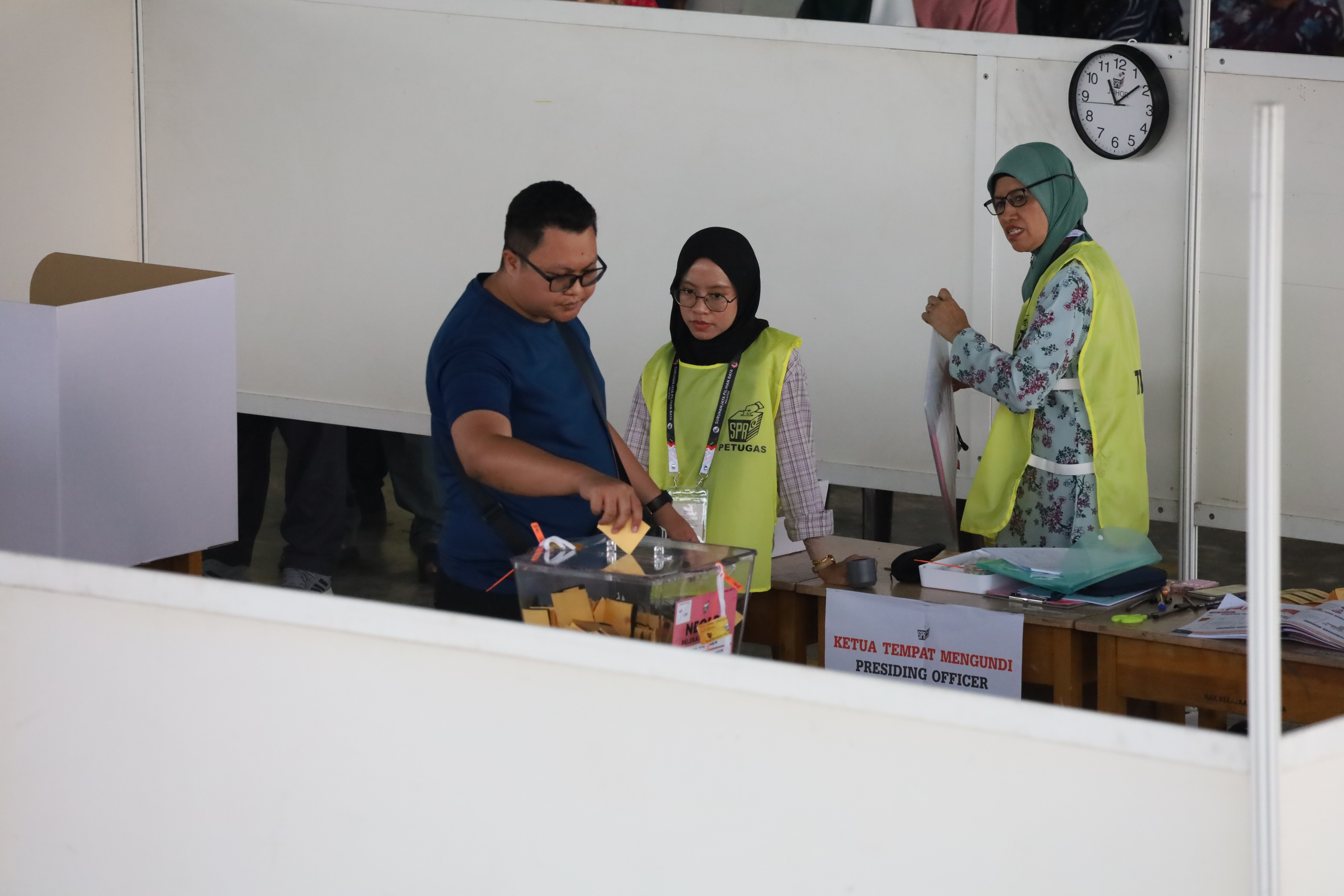
A voter casts his vote at the Tanjung Puteri Primary School polling booth on voting day.

Elections in Malaysia are conducted at the federal and state levels. Federal elections elect members of the Dewan Rakyat, the lower house of Parliament, while state elections in each of the 13 states elect members of their respective state legislative assembly. As Malaysia follows the Westminster system of government, the head of government (Prime Minister at the federal level and the Menteri Besar/Chief Ministers/Premier at the state level) is the person who commands the confidence of the majority of members in the respective legislature – this is normally the leader of the party or coalition with the majority of seats in the legislature.

The Legislative Assembly currently consists of 56 members, known as Members of the Legislative Assembly (MLAs), that are elected for five-year terms. Each MLA is elected from a single-member constituencies using the first-past-the-post voting system; each constituency contains approximately an equal number of voters. If one party obtains a majority of seats, then that party is entitled to form the government, with its leader becoming the Premier. In the event of a hung parliament, where no single party obtains the majority of seats, the government may still form through a coalition or a confidence and supply agreement with other parties. In practice, coalitions and alliances in Malaysia, and by extension, in Sarawak, generally persist between elections, and member parties do not normally contest for the same seats.

The voting age is currently 18. Elections are conducted by the Election Commission of Malaysia, which is under the jurisdiction of the Prime Minister's Department. Malaysia practices automatic voter registration but does not practice compulsory voting.

== Preparations ==
=== Political parties ===
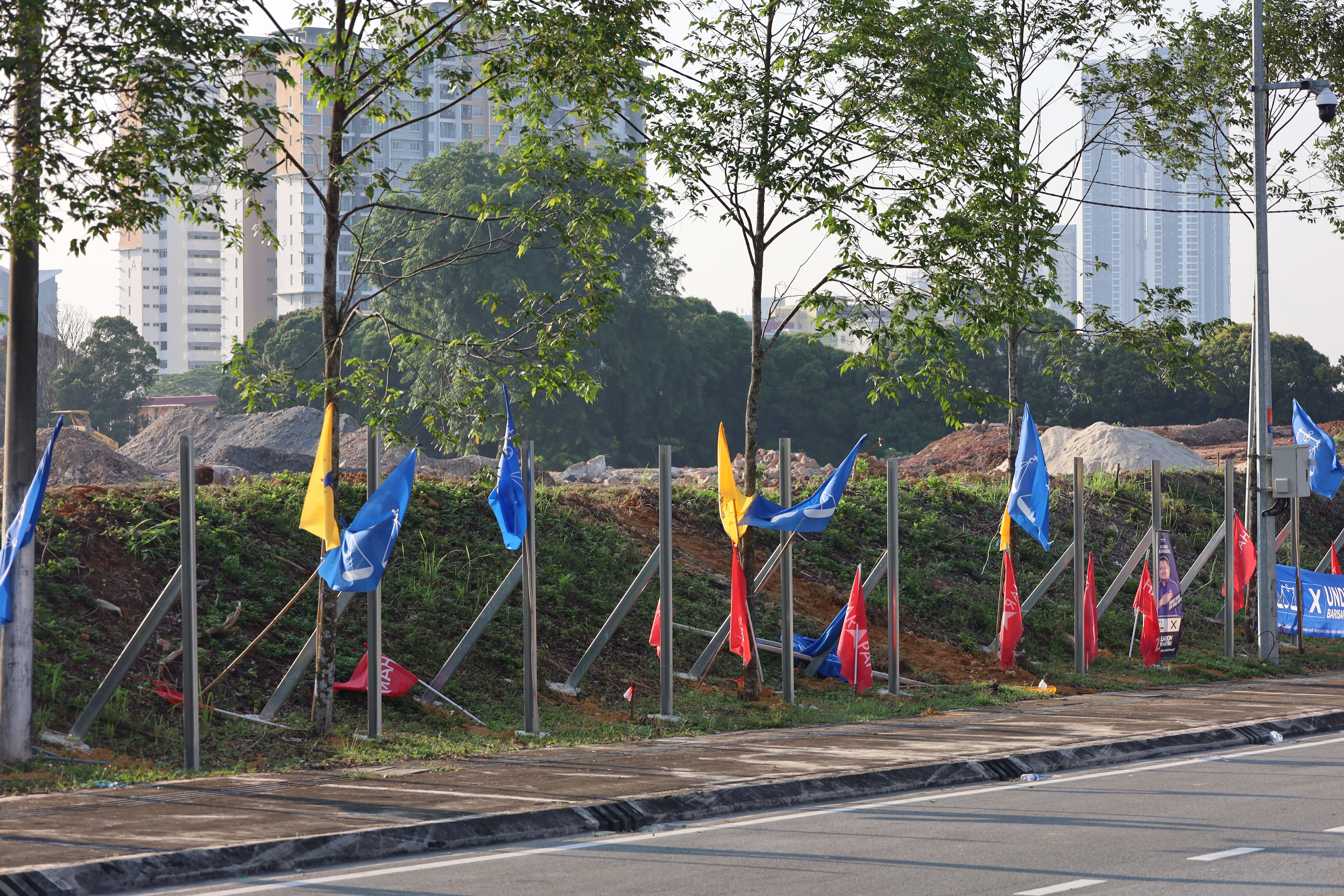
Party flags around the Larkin constituency on voting day.

Barisan Nasional is expected to defend its governing majority which it received in the 2022 state elections, when BN was returned to power by a supermajority. Pakatan Harapan aims to regain influence after losing control in 2020 due to the Sheraton Move. Notably, PH's loss in 2022 was partially caused by low turnout among non-Malay voters.

Perikatan Nasional may also expand its challenge in Malay-majority constituencies. After PAS cut ties with Bersatu, its local Johor branch decided to continue cooperation with Bersatu in Johor until cooperation was revoked shortly after the polls began. Both Bersatu and PAS also explored cooperation outside PN, with Bersatu and MIPP negotiating an electoral pact with MUDA. Meanwhile, PAS sought cooperation with BERJASA and PUTRA and allowed Bersatu breakaway Hamzah Zainuddin's party Wawasan to contest under PN. As negotiations were concluding, all parties in PN except Wawasan but including Pejuang were allocated seats to contest under PN. Gerakan decided to withdraw from the elections which led to the suspension of Gerakan's Johor chapter. Far right parties BERJASA and PUTRA decided not to participate in the election, and PUTRA asked voters to reject BN. Deputy president of PAS Tuan Ibrahim Tuan Man later urged PAS supporters to vote BN in seats not contested by PN, followed by a broader statement from Hadi Awang not to vote for PH. This was seen as potentially leading to an informal pact similar to the former Muafakat Nasional alliance. Meanwhile, Bersatu did not offer any advise on how the party's supporters should vote.

MUDA defended its only seat in Puteri Wangsa and decided to contest with Socialist Party under a Progressive Bloc. Having broken away from PKR, the new Bersama party led by Rafizi Ramli contested this election as its debut election and as preparation for the next general election. It rejected any coalition talks. Parti Rakyat Malaysia initially wanted to participate, but cancelled their plan to contest. The election was the first appearance of Parti Orang Asli Malaysia.

Seat negotiations among opposition parties are expected to play a major role in determining electoral competitiveness.

=== Dear You-related advertisements ===
On July 5, Pakatan Harapan advertised on Sin Chew Daily with a grandmother writing to her granddaughter to vote, in reference to Dear You, a popular 2026 Chinese film, which triggered Kuso Alliance, a supporter of Barisan Nasional, as well as Parti Bersama to make their own versions of advertisements. This initiative aimed to mobilise Chinese voters living outside Johor, particularly those residing in Kuala Lumpur or Singapore. However, The Straits Times reported that local Johor voters remained unaffected by the campaign, with one Kulai resident describing PH's advertisements as "moral blackmail" that subtly pressured out-of-state residents to return home to vote.

== Campaign slogans ==
Party	Slogan
Pakatan Harapan	Johor Ke Depan; Undi Harapan; Johor Untuk Semua
Barisan Nasional	Maju Johor: Kestabilan Dikekalkan, Kemajuan Diteruskan
Perikatan Nasional	Berkat, Prihatin, Sejahtera; Jom Jaga Johor (PAS)
Perikatan Nasional	Bersatu Demi Johor (BERSATU)
Progressive Bloc	Suara Kita (MUDA)
Progressive Bloc	Skudai Saksama (PSM)
Malaysian United Party	Ayuh Johor, Ayuh Bersama

== Timeline ==
The key dates are listed below.

Date	Event
1 June 2026	Dissolution of Johor State Legislative Assembly.
12 June 2026	Issue the Writ of Election.
27 June 2026	Nomination Day.
27 June–10 July 2026	Campaigning Period.
7–10 July 2026	Early Polling Days for Postal, Overseas and Advance Voters.
11 July 2026	Polling Day.

== Departing incumbents ==
The following members of the 15th Johor State Legislative Assembly did not seek re-election.

No.	State Constituency	Departing MLA	Coalition (Party)	Date confirmed	First elected	Reason
N48	Skudai	Marina Ibrahim	PH (DAP)	31 May 2026	2022	Not seeking re-election
N28	Mengkibol	Chew Chong Sin	PH (DAP)	13 June 2026	2018	Not seeking re-election (Transferred to Labis)
N42	Johor Jaya	Liow Cai Tung	PH (DAP)	20 June 2026	2013	Not seeking re-election (Contesting parliamentary seat)
N23	Penggaram	Gan Peck Cheng	PH (DAP)	22 June 2026	2013	Not seeking re-election
N46	Perling	Liew Chin Tong	PH (DAP)	22 June 2026	2022	Dropped by party (MP for Iskandar Puteri)
N25	Rengit	Mohd Puad Zarkashi	BN (UMNO)	17 June 2026	2022	Not seeking re-election
N05	Tenang	Haslinda Salleh	BN (UMNO)	24 June 2026	2022	Dropped by party
N11	Serom	Khairin Nisa Ismail	BN (UMNO)	24 June 2026	2022	Dropped by party
N14	Bukit Naning	Mohd Fuad Tukirin	BN (UMNO)	24 June 2026	2022	Dropped by party
N34	Panti	Hahasrin Hashim	BN (UMNO)	24 June 2026	2018	Dropped by party
N35	Pasir Raja	Rashidah Ismail	BN (UMNO)	24 June 2026	2018	Dropped by party
N40	Tiram	Azizul Bachok	BN (UMNO)	24 June 2026	2022	Dropped by party
N53	Benut	Hasni Mohammad	BN (UMNO)	24 June 2026	2008	Dropped by party (MP for Simpang Renggam)
N56	Kukup	Jefridin Atan	BN (UMNO)	24 June 2026	2022	Dropped by party
N04	Kemelah	Saraswathy Nallathamby	BN (MIC)	24 June 2026	2022	Dropped by party
N31	Kahang	Vidyananthan Ramanadhan	BN (MIC)	24 June 2026	2008	Dropped by party
N15	Maharani	Abdul Aziz Talib	PN (PAS)	25 June 2026	2022	Dropped by party
N41	Puteri Wangsa	Amira Aisya Abdul Aziz	MUDA	20 June 2026	2022	Not seeking re-election (Contesting parliamentary seat)

=== Incumbents contested in different party ===
No.	State Constituency	MLA	Coalition (Party)		First elected
No.	State Constituency	MLA	Formerly	Current	First elected
N27	Layang-Layang	Abd Mutalip Abd Rahim	BN (UMNO)	PN (BERSATU)	2013
N32	Endau	Alwiyah Talib	PN (BERSATU)	BN (UMNO)	2018

=== Incumbents contested in different constituency ===
MLA	Coalition (Party)	State Constituency		First elected
MLA	Coalition (Party)	Formerly	Current	First elected
Raven Kumar Krishnasamy	BN (MIC)	N33 Tenggaroh	N04 Kemelah	2013

=== Incumbents lost re-election in the 2026 election ===
No.	State Constituency	Departing MLA	Coalition (Party)	First elected
N02	Jementah	Ng Kor Sim	PH (DAP)	2022
N07	Bukit Kepong	Sahruddin Jamal	PN (BERSATU)	2018
N10	Tangkak	Ee Chin Li	PH (DAP)	2013
N27	Layang-Layang	Abd Mutalip Abd Rahim	PN (BERSATU)	2013 (Note: Formerly BN (UMNO))
N51	Bukit Batu	Arthur Chiong Sen Sern	PH (PKR)	2022

== Candidates ==
No.	Parliamentary constituency	No.	State Constituency	Number of Voters	Constituency Largest Ethnic	Incumbent Member	Incumbent Coalition (Party)	Political coalitions and respective candidates and coalitions											
No.	Parliamentary constituency	No.	State Constituency	Number of Voters	Constituency Largest Ethnic	Incumbent Member	Incumbent Coalition (Party)	Barisan Nasional (BN)		Pakatan Harapan (PH)		Perikatan Nasional (PN)		Malaysian United Party (BERSAMA)		Progressive Block		Others	
No.	Parliamentary constituency	No.	State Constituency	Number of Voters	Constituency Largest Ethnic	Incumbent Member	Incumbent Coalition (Party)	Candidate name	Party	Candidate name	Party	Candidate name	Party	Candidate name	Party	Candidate name	Party	Candidate name	Party
P140	Segamat	N01	Buloh Kasap	28,973	Malay	Zahari Sarip	BN (UMNO)	Zahari Sarip	UMNO	Noraziah Mohd Razit	PKR	Not Contested		Not Contested		Not Contested			
P140	Segamat	N02	Jementah	41,137	Chinese	Ng Kor Sim	PH (DAP)	See Ann Giap	MCA	Ng Kor Sim	DAP	Saifullah Abdul Wahab	PAS	Not Contested		Not Contested			
P141	Sekijang	N03	Pemanis	30,458	Malay	Anuar Abdul Manap	BN (UMNO)	Anuar Abdul Manap	UMNO	Jalex Lee En Xiang	PKR	Ariventharan Anandan	MIPP	Not Contested		Not Contested			
P141	Sekijang	N04	Kemelah	35,365	Malay	Saraswathy Nallathamby	BN (MIC)	Raven Kumar Krishnasamy	MIC	Mohd Afif Abd Hamid	AMANAH	Uzzair Ismail	BERSATU	Not Contested		Not Contested			
P142	Labis	N05	Tenang	22,616	Malay	Haslinda Salleh	BN (UMNO)	Mohd Azahar Ibrahim	UMNO	Elia Nadira Sabudin	AMANAH	Normala Sudirman	PAS	Not Contested		Not Contested		Siti Aisyah Zobir	IND
P142	Labis	N06	Bekok	27,317	Chinese	Tan Chong	BN (MCA)	Tan Chong	MCA	Tay Yok Jiuen	DAP	Not Contested		Not Contested		Not Contested			
P143	Pagoh	N07	Bukit Kepong	37,683	Malay	Sahruddin Jamal	PN (BERSATU)	Ahmad Syar'e Yusof	UMNO	Subramani Chami	PKR	Sahruddin Jamal	BERSATU	Not Contested		Not Contested			
P143	Pagoh	N08	Bukit Pasir	34,142	Malay	Mohamad Fazli Salleh	BN (UMNO)	Fazli Salleh	UMNO	Najib Lep	AMANAH	Idzhar Nasirruddin	BERSATU	Not Contested		Not Contested			
P144	Ledang	N09	Gambir	30,326	Malay	Sahrihan Jani	BN (UMNO)	Sahrihan Jani	UMNO	Mohd Nor Mohd Yusof	PKR	Suraya Sulaiman	PEJUANG	Not Contested		Not Contested			
P144	Ledang	N10	Tangkak	36,955	Chinese	Ee Chin Li	PH (DAP)	Haw Chin Teck	MCA	Ee Chin Li	DAP	Not Contested		Not Contested		Not Contested			
P144	Ledang	N11	Serom	40,172	Malay	Khairin Nisa Ismail	BN (UMNO)	Nadhirah Afiqah Abdul Rahim	UMNO	Ahmad Nazari Abd Hamid	AMANAH	Mahfidz Omar	BERSATU	Not Contested		Not Contested			
P145	Bakri	N12	Bentayan	34,205	Chinese	Ng Yak Howe	PH (DAP)	Chua Lee Huat	MCA	Ng Yak Howe	DAP	Not Contested		Not Contested		Not Contested			
P145	Bakri	N13	Simpang Jeram	41,975	Malay	Nazri Abdul Rahman	PH (AMANAH)	Azman Ismail	UMNO	Nazri Abdul Rahman	AMANAH	Arshed Yahya	PAS	Not Contested		Ainie Haziqah Shafii	MUDA		
P145	Bakri	N14	Bukit Naning	23,002	Malay	Mohd Fuad Tukirin	BN (UMNO)	Mohd Ghazali Sabari	UMNO	Md Ysahrudin Kusni	PKR	Radzi Amin	BERSATU	Iskandar Md Alias	BERSAMA	Not Contested		Jeganathan Subramaniam	IND
P146	Muar	N15	Maharani	40,040	Malay	Abdul Aziz Talib	PN (PAS)	Ashari Md Sarip	UMNO	Muhammad Taqiuddin Cheman	AMANAH	Mohamad Anuar Hayan	PAS	Not Contested		Muhammad Amir Fiqri	MUDA		
P146	Muar	N16	Sungai Balang	31,039	Malay	Selamat Takim	BN (UMNO)	Selamat Takim	UMNO	Ayna Soraya Badaruddin	PKR	Muhammad Amin Sailan	PAS	Not Contested		Not Contested			
P147	Parit Sulong	N17	Semerah	47,431	Malay	Mohd Fared Mohd Khalid	BN (UMNO)	Mohd Fared Mohd Khalid	UMNO	Mohd Khuzzan Abu Bakar	PKR	Halim Kepol	PAS	Not Contested		Not Contested			
P147	Parit Sulong	N18	Sri Medan	33,875	Malay	Zulkurnain Kamisan	BN (UMNO)	Zulkurnain Kamisan	UMNO	Hishamuddin Misrin Ishak	PKR	Ahmed Rosdi Bahari	PAS	Not Contested		Not Contested			
P148	Ayer Hitam	N19	Yong Peng	34,023	Chinese	Ling Tian Soon	BN (MCA)	Ling Tian Soon	MCA	Yong Hui Yi	DAP	Not Contested		Not Contested		Not Contested			
P148	Ayer Hitam	N20	Semarang	28,753	Malay	Samsolbari Jamali	BN (UMNO)	Samsolbari Jamali	UMNO	Ramli Abd Hamid	AMANAH	Syafiq Aziz	BERSATU	Not Contested		Not Contested			
P149	Sri Gading	N21	Parit Yaani	44,741	Malay	Mohamad Najib Samuri	BN (UMNO)	Mohamad Najib Samuri	UMNO	Md Ezam Md Taslim	AMANAH	Not Contested		Not Contested		Not Contested			
P149	Sri Gading	N22	Parit Raja	38,159	Malay	Nor Rashidah Ramli	BN (UMNO)	Nor Rashidah Ramli	UMNO	Shazwan Zdainal Abidin	DAP	Mohamed Maliki Mohamed Rapiee	BERSATU	Not Contested		Not Contested			
P150	Batu Pahat	N23	Penggaram	70,294	Chinese	Gan Peck Cheng	PH (DAP)	Boo Chin Liong	MCA	Felicia Poh Rui Ling	DAP	Not Contested		Not Contested		Not Contested			
P150	Batu Pahat	N24	Senggarang	38,576	Malay	Mohd Yusla Ismail	BN (UMNO)	Mohd Yusla Ismail	UMNO	Onn Abu Bakar	PKR	Mohd Rashid Hasnon	BERSATU	Not Contested		Not Contested			
P150	Batu Pahat	N25	Rengit	27,608	Malay	Mohd Puad Zarkashi	BN (UMNO)	Zaidi Japar	UMNO	Mohamad Yazid Bakri	AMANAH	Syed Mohamad Syed Alwi	BERSATU	Not Contested		Not Contested			
P151	Simpang Renggam	N26	Machap	35,206	Malay	Onn Hafiz Ghazi	BN (UMNO)	Onn Hafiz Ghazi	UMNO	Nor Hafiz Roslan	AMANAH	Not Contested		Not Contested		Not Contested			
P151	Simpang Renggam	N27	Layang-Layang	25,181	Malay	Abd Mutalip Abd Rahim	BN (UMNO)	Chua Jian Boon	MCA	Guna Balakrishnan	PKR	Abd Mutalip Abd Rahim	BERSATU	Not Contested		Not Contested			
P152	Kluang	N28	Mengkibol	68,457	Chinese	Chew Chong Sin	PH (DAP)	Yap Zhi Peng	MCA	Chu Poh Yee	DAP	Not Contested		Not Contested		Not Contested			
P152	Kluang	N29	Mahkota	67,562	Malay	Syed Hussien Syed Abdullah	BN (UMNO)	Syed Hussien Syed Abdullah	UMNO	Ahmad Zuhan Md Zain	AMANAH	Not Contested		Abdul Hamid Ali	BERSAMA	Not Contested			
P153	Sembrong	N30	Paloh	25,419	Malay	Lee Ting Han	BN (MCA)	Lee Ting Han	MCA	Ruban Arumugam	DAP	Jeevakumar Dhayalan	MIPP	Not Contested		Not Contested		Kamaleswaren Ganabathi	IND
P153	Sembrong	N31	Kahang	29,814	Malay	Vidyananthan Ramanadhan	BN (MIC)	Rugendran Vellayan	MIC	Mohd Sabri Abd Kadir	AMANAH	Mazlan Bujang	PAS	Not Contested		Not Contested			
P154	Mersing	N32	Endau	28,767	Malay	Alwiyah Talib	PN (BERSATU)	Alwiyah Talib	UMNO	Saiful Nizam Samat	PKR	Hasnul Hakimi Hussien	PAS	Not Contested		Jati Awang	ASLI		
P154	Mersing	N33	Tenggaroh	39,001	Malay	Raven Kumar Krishnasamy	BN (MIC)	Mohd Youzaimi Yusof	UMNO	Md Yusof Dawam	PKR	Muhamad Amerul Muhamad	BERSATU	Not Contested		Not Contested			
P155	Tenggara	N34	Panti	41,407	Malay	Hahasrin Hashim	BN (UMNO)	Muhammad Naqib Md Ghazali	UMNO	Ahmad Daniel Sharudin	AMANAH	Mohamad Alias Rasman	BERSATU	Not Contested		Not Contested			
P155	Tenggara	N35	Pasir Raja	29,818	Malay	Rashidah Ismail	BN (UMNO)	Adham Baba	UMNO	Mohd Fakharuddin Moslim	PKR	Yuhanita Yunan	PAS	Not Contested		Not Contested			
P156	Kota Tinggi	N36	Sedili	29,090	Malay	Muszaide Makmor	BN (UMNO)	Muszaide Makmor	UMNO	Amirul Huzni Onn	AMANAH	Rasman Ithnain	BERSATU	Not Contested		Not Contested			
P156	Kota Tinggi	N37	Johor Lama	32,716	Malay	Norlizah Noh	BN (UMNO)	Norlizah Noh	UMNO	Danish Rahman	PKR	Aisah Esa	BERSATU	Not Contested		Not Contested			
P157	Pengerang	N38	Penawar	31,112	Malay	Fauziah Misri	BN (UMNO)	Fauziah Misri	UMNO	Mohd Sawaludin Salleh	AMANAH	Fairulnizar Rahmat	BERSATU	Not Contested		Not Contested			
P157	Pengerang	N39	Tanjung Surat	26,943	Malay	Aznan Tamin	BN (UMNO)	Aznan Tamin	UMNO	Faizul Abdul Ghani	PKR	Not Contested		Not Contested		Not Contested			
P158	Tebrau	N40	Tiram	117,496	Malay	Azizul Bachok	BN (UMNO)	Abdul Halim Suleiman	UMNO	Nor Zulaila Abd Ghani	DAP	Khirul Muntanazar Ismail	PAS	Harith Fakhrudin Abdul Malek	BERSAMA	Not Contested			
P158	Tebrau	N41	Puteri Wangsa	128,723	Chinese	Amira Aisya Abdul Aziz	MUDA	Teow Chia Ling	MCA	Maszlee Malik	PKR	Not Contested		Nicholas Paul Vincent	BERSAMA	Rashifa Aljuneid	MUDA	Wang Wee Siong	IND
P159	Pasir Gudang	N42	Johor Jaya	97,685	Chinese	Liow Cai Tung	PH (DAP)	Chan San San	MCA	Lee Wern Yiing	DAP	Not Contested		Lau Yi Leong	BERSAMA	Not Contested		Lim Hun Peaw	IND
P159	Pasir Gudang	N43	Permas	113,963	Malay	Baharudin Mohamed Taib	BN (UMNO)	Baharudin Mohamed Taib	UMNO	Sharon Teo Siew Hui	AMANAH	Vela Tebakumaran	MIPP	Zamil Najwah	BERSAMA	Not Contested			
P160	Johor Bahru	N44	Larkin	76,662	Malay	Mohd Hairi Mad Shah	BN (UMNO)	Mohd Hairi Mad Shah	UMNO	Suhaizan Kayat	AMANAH	Not Contested		Norsinah Abu	BERSAMA	Not Contested			
P160	Johor Bahru	N45	Stulang	60,029	Chinese	Andrew Chen Kah Eng	PH (DAP)	Bong Seng Heng	MCA	Andrew Chen Kah Eng	DAP	Lim Chin Eng	BERSATU	Stanley Tan Boon Heng	BERSAMA	Not Contested			
P161	Pulai	N46	Perling	109,992	Chinese	Liew Chin Tong	PH (DAP)	Pannir Selvam Paliksina	MIC	Alan Tee Boon Tsong	DAP	Not Contested		Boo Wei Han	BERSAMA	Not Contested			
P161	Pulai	N47	Kempas	64,244	Malay	Ramlee Bohani	BN (UMNO)	Ramlee Bohani	UMNO	Mohd Faezuddin Puad	PKR	Not Contested		Salamahafifi Yusnaieny	BERSAMA	Not Contested			
P162	Iskandar Puteri	N48	Skudai	106,805	Chinese	Marina Ibrahim	PH (DAP)	Tan Hiang Kee	MCA	Kartiyaini Jeyapalan	DAP	Not Contested		Eugene Chua Meng Chong	BERSAMA	Amir Syafiq Ameer Soekre	PSM		
P162	Iskandar Puteri	N49	Kota Iskandar	132,579	Malay	Pandak Ahmad	BN (UMNO)	Pandak Ahmad	UMNO	Dzulkefly Ahmad	AMANAH	Anna Pravina Segaran	MIPP	Sahrudin Omar	BERSAMA	Not Contested			
P163	Kulai	N50	Bukit Permai	44,819	Malay	Mohd Jafni Md Shukor	BN (UMNO)	Mohd Jafni Md Shukor	UMNO	Mohamad Shafwan Ani	DAP	Lina Manoh Manogaran	MIPP	Mohamad Aidil Riduan Mohd Yusof	BERSAMA	Not Contested			
P163	Kulai	N51	Bukit Batu	49,963	Chinese	Arthur Chiong Sen Sern	PH (PKR)	Kumaran Ramakrishnan	MIC	Arthur Chiong Sen Sern	PKR	Not Contested		Tamili Gopalakrishnan	BERSAMA	Premanand Maniam	MUDA	Kamaruzaman Ali	IND
P163	Kulai	N52	Senai	66,635	Chinese	Wong Bor Yang	PH (DAP)	Tai Chee Chee	MCA	Wong Bor Yang	DAP	Not Contested		Tew Chian How	BERSAMA	Not Contested			
P164	Pontian	N53	Benut	28,798	Malay	Hasni Mohammad	BN (UMNO)	Mohd Sumali Reduan	UMNO	Abdul Razak Ismail	AMANAH	Not Contested		Not Contested		Not Contested			
P164	Pontian	N54	Pulai Sebatang	47,651	Malay	Hasrunizah Hassan	BN (UMNO)	Hasrunizah Hassan	UMNO	Haniff Ghazali Hosman	PKR	Not Contested		Not Contested		Not Contested			
P165	Tanjung Piai	N55	Pekan Nanas	37,556	Malay	Tan Eng Meng	BN (MCA)	Tan Eng Meng	MCA	Yeo Tung Siong	DAP	Not Contested		Not Contested		Not Contested			
P165	Tanjung Piai	N56	Kukup	34,968	Malay	Jefridin Atan	BN (UMNO)	Md Israk Abdullah	UMNO	Cheah Chee Hong	PKR	Not Contested		Not Contested		Not Contested			

=== Statistics and Summary ===
172 candidates are nominated in this election.

Alliance / Party / Independents		Number of candidates
Barisan Nasional (BN)	United Malays National Organisation (UMNO)	37
Barisan Nasional (BN)	Malaysian Chinese Association (MCA)	15
Barisan Nasional (BN)	Malaysian Indian Congress (MIC)	4
Barisan Nasional (BN)	Total	56
Pakatan Harapan (PH)	People's Justice Party (PKR)	20
Pakatan Harapan (PH)	National Trust Party (AMANAH)	19
Pakatan Harapan (PH)	Democratic Action Party (DAP)	17
Pakatan Harapan (PH)	Total	56
Perikatan Nasional (PN)	Parti Pribumi Bersatu Malaysia (BERSATU)	16
Perikatan Nasional (PN)	Parti Islam Se-Malaysia (PAS)	11
Perikatan Nasional (PN)	Malaysian Indian People's Party (MIPP)	5
Perikatan Nasional (PN)	Homeland Fighter's Party (PEJUANG)	1
Perikatan Nasional (PN)	Total	33
Malaysian United Party (BERSAMA)		15
Progressive Bloc	Malaysian United Democratic Alliance (MUDA)	4
Progressive Bloc	Malaysian Orang Asli Party (ASLI)	1
Progressive Bloc	Socialist Party of Malaysia (PSM)	1
Progressive Bloc	Total	6
Independent		6
Total		172

==== Seats contested by candidates ====
Number of candidates	Number of seats contested
2-way contest	14 (Note: Seats are N01 Buloh Kasap, N06 Bekok, N10 Tangkak, N12 Bentayan, N19 Yong Peng, N21 Parit Yaani, N23 Penggaram, N26 Machap, N28 Mengkibol, N39 Tanjung Surat.)
3-way contest	27 (Note: Seats are N02 Jementah, N03 Pemanis, N04 Kemelah, N05 Tenang, N07 Bukit Kepong, N08 Bukit Pasir, N09 Gambir, N11 Serom, N16 Sungai Balang, N17 Semerah, N18 Sri Medan, N20 Semarang, N22 Parit Raja, N24 Senggarang, N25 Rengit, N27 Layang-Layang, N29 Mahkota, N31 Kahang, N33 Tenggaroh, N34 Panti, N35 Pasir Raja, N36 Sedili, N37 Johor Lama, N38 Penawar, N42 Johor Jaya, N44 Larkin, N46 Perling, N47 Kempas, N52 Senai.)
4-way contest	12 (Note: Seats are N13 Simpang Jeram, N15 Maharani, N30 Paloh, N32 Endau, N40 Tiram, N43 Permas, N45 Stulang, N48 Skudai, N49 Kota Iskandar, N50 Bukit Permai, N53 Benut, N54 Pulai Sebatang, N55 Pekan Nanas, N56 Kukup.)
5-way contest	3 (Note: Seats are N14 Bukit Naning, N41 Puteri Wangsa, N51 Bukit Batu.)

==== Candidates gender ====
Gender	Number of candidates
Male	138
Female	34

==== Candidates age range ====
Age range	Number of candidates
20 - 29	9
30 - 39	38
40 - 49	50
50 - 59	48
60 and above	27

== Opinion polls ==
Pollster	Fieldwork date	Sample size	BN	PH	PN	Others	Lead	Ref
Ilham Centre	26 June − 9 July 2026	1,250						
Vodus Research	15−29 June 2026	1,303	36%	26%	15%	13%	BN +10%	

== Results ==
=== Summary ===
2026 Johor State Election
Party or alliance		Votes	%	Seats	+/–
Barisan Nasional	United Malays National Organisation	766,262	40.87	36	+3
Barisan Nasional	Malaysian Chinese Association	274,786	14.66	8	+4
Barisan Nasional	Malaysian Indian Congress	77,511	4.13	4	+1
Barisan Nasional	Total	1,118,559	59.66	48	+8
Pakatan Harapan	Democratic Action Party	291,273	15.54	6	–4
Pakatan Harapan	National Trust Party	163,154	8.70	1	0
Pakatan Harapan	People's Justice Party	157,556	8.40	1	0
Pakatan Harapan	Total	611,983	32.64	8	–4
Perikatan Nasional	Malaysian United Indigenous Party	46,072	2.46	0	–2
Perikatan Nasional	Pan-Malaysian Islamic Party	45,934	2.45	0	–1
Perikatan Nasional	Malaysian Indian People's Party	8,196	0.44	0	New
Perikatan Nasional	Homeland Fighter's Party	1,888	0.10	0	0
Perikatan Nasional	Total	102,090	5.45	0	–3
Malaysian United Party		28,816	1.54	0	New
Blok Progresif	Malaysian United Democratic Alliance	10,236	0.55	0	–1
Blok Progresif	Socialist Party of Malaysia	964	0.05	0	0
Blok Progresif	Malaysian Orang Asli Party	394	0.02	0	0
Blok Progresif	Total	11,594	0.62	0	–1
Independents		1,876	0.10	–	0
Total		1,874,918	100.00	56	–
Valid votes		1,874,918	98.79		
Invalid/blank votes		22,974	1.21		
Total votes		1,897,892	100.00		
Registered voters/turnout		2,727,926	69.57		
Source: electiondata.MY

↓
Barisan Nasional government (48)			Pakatan Harapan opposition (8)
48			8
Barisan Nasional			Pakatan Harapan
36	8	4	6	1	1
UMNO	MCA	MIC	DAP	AMANAH	PKR
Johor State Legislative Assembly, 11 July 2026 (56 seats)

=== By parliamentary constituency ===
No.	Constituency	Barisan Nasional	Pakatan Harapan	Others	Member of Parliament
P140	Segamat	57.10%	36.66%	6.24%	Yuneswaran Ramaraj
P141	Sekijang	58.28%	31.31%	10.42%	Zaliha Mustafa
P142	Labis	59.95%	34.92%	5.13%	Pang Hok Liong
P143	Pagoh	59.56%	21.96%	18.48%	Muhyiddin Yassin
P144	Ledang	59.12%	33.54%	7.34%	Syed Ibrahim Syed Noh
P145	Bakri	42.16%	46.07%	11.77%	Tan Hong Pin
P146	Muar	48.94%	24.80%	26.26%	Syed Saddiq Syed Abdul Rahman
P147	Parit Sulong	70.69%	15.95%	13.36%	Noraini Ahmad
P148	Ayer Hitam	69.00%	25.00%	6.00%	Wee Ka Siong
P149	Sri Gading	65.42%	30.24%	4.34%	Aminolhuda Hassan
P150	Batu Pahat	55.79%	40.13%	4.07%	Onn Abu Bakar
P151	Simpang Renggam	74.97%	20.35%	4.67%	Hasni Mohammad
P152	Kluang	56.12%	42.15%	1.74%	Wong Shu Qi
P153	Sembrong	69.38%	21.58%	9.05%	Hishammuddin Hussein
P154	Mersing	64.99%	11.72%	23.30%	Muhammad Islahuddin Abas
P155	Tenggara	75.87%	14.41%	9.72%	Manndzri Nasib
P156	Kota Tinggi	82.43%	7.38%	10.19%	Mohamed Khaled Nordin
P157	Pengerang	85.91%	6.04%	8.05%	Azalina Othman Said
P158	Tebrau	50.77%	37.49%	11.74%	Jimmy Puah Wee Tse
P159	Pasir Gudang	59.67%	34.59%	5.73%	Hassan Abdul Karim
P160	Johor Bahru	58.20%	35.68%	6.12%	Akmal Nasrullah Mohd Nasir
P161	Pulai	55.27%	40.41%	4.32%	Suhaizan Kayat
P162	Iskandar Puteri	50.78%	43.52%	5.71%	Liew Chin Tong
P163	Kulai	51.88%	43.72%	4.40%	Teo Nie Ching
P164	Pontian	76.90%	23.10%	—N/a	Ahmad Maslan
P165	Tanjung Piai	72.27%	27.73%	—N/a	Wee Jeck Seng

=== Lost deposits ===
Alliance / Party / Independents		Total
Perikatan Nasional (PN)	Parti Pribumi Bersatu Malaysia (BERSATU)	10 (Note: Seats are N14 Bukit Naning, N20 Semarang, N22 Parit Raja, N24 Senggarang, N25 Rengit, N27 Layang-Layang, N34 Panti, N36 Sedili, N37 Johor Lama, N45 Stulang.)
Perikatan Nasional (PN)	Parti Islam Se-Malaysia (PAS)	5 (Note: Seats are N02 Jementah, N05 Tenang, N17 Semerah, N35 Pasir Raja, N40 Tiram.)
Perikatan Nasional (PN)	Malaysian Indian People's Party (MIPP)	5 (Note: Seats are N03 Pemanis, N30 Paloh, N43 Permas, N49 Kota Iskandar, N50 Bukit Permai.)
Perikatan Nasional (PN)	Homeland Fighter's Party (PEJUANG)	1 (Note: N09 Gambir)
Perikatan Nasional (PN)	Total	21
Malaysian United Party (BERSAMA)		15 (Note: Seats are N14 Bukit Naning, N29 Mahkota, N40 Tiram, N41 Puteri Wangsa, N42 Johor Jaya, N43 Permas, N44 Larkin, N45 Stulang, N46 Perling, N47 Kempas, N48 Skudai, N49 Kota Iskandar, N50 Bukit Permai, N51 Bukit Batu, N52 Senai.)
Pakatan Harapan (PH)	People's Justice Party (PKR)	4 (Note: Seats are N18 Sri Medan, N33 Tenggaroh, N37 Johor Lama, N39 Tanjung Surat.)
Pakatan Harapan (PH)	National Trust Party (AMANAH)	3 (Note: Seats are N20 Semarang, N36 Sedili, N38 Penawar.)
Pakatan Harapan (PH)	Total	7
Independent		6 (Note: Seats are N05 Tenang, N14 Bukit Naning, N30 Paloh, N41 Puteri Wangsa, N42 Johor Jaya, N51 Bukit Batu.)
Malaysian United Democratic Alliance (MUDA)		4 (Note: Seats are N13 Simpang Jeram, N15 Maharani, N41 Puteri Wangsa, N51 Bukit Batu.)
Malaysian Orang Asli Party (ASLI)		1 (Note: N32 Endau)
Socialist Party of Malaysia (PSM)		1 (Note: N48 Skudai)
Total		55

=== Flipped seats ===
No.	Seat	Previous Party (2022)	Current Party (2026)
N02	Jementah	PH (DAP)	BN (MCA)
N07	Bukit Kepong	PN (BERSATU)	BN (UMNO)
N10	Tangkak	PH (DAP)	BN (MCA)
N15	Maharani	PN (PAS)	BN (UMNO)
N27	Layang-Layang	BN (UMNO)	BN (MCA)
N32	Endau	PN (BERSATU)	BN (UMNO)
N33	Tenggaroh	BN (MIC)	BN (UMNO)
N41	Puteri Wangsa	MUDA	PH (PKR)
N42	Johor Jaya	PH (DAP)	BN (MCA)
N46	Perling	PH (DAP)	BN (MIC)
N51	Bukit Batu	PH (PKR)	BN (MIC)

=== Post-election pendulum ===
Pre-election pendulum

GOVERNMENT SEATS
Marginal
Bukit Pasir	Mohamad Fadzli Mohamed Salleh	UMNO	32.11
Bukit Naning	Mohd. Fuad Tukirin	UMNO	37.37
Serom	Khairin-Nisa Ismail @ Md. On	UMNO	37.56
Parit Yaani	Mohamad Najib Samuri	UMNO	38.56
Kempas	Ramlee Bohani	UMNO	38.92
Tiram	Azizul Bachok	UMNO	39.59
Permas	Baharudin Mohamed Taib	UMNO	40.74
Kota Iskandar	Pandak Ahmad	UMNO	40.79
Kemelah	Saraswati Nallathamby	MIC	41.13
Larkin	Mohd. Hairi Mad Shah	UMNO	41.77
Tenang	Haslinda Salleh	UMNO	44.91
Semerah	Mohd. Fared Mohamed Khalid	UMNO	44.93
Senggarang	Mohd. Yusla Ismail	UMNO	45.11
Gambir	Sahrihan Jani	UMNO	45.48
Sungai Balang	Selamat Takim	UMNO	45.57
Mahkota	Sharifah Azizah Syed Zain	UMNO	46.57
Bukit Permai	Mohd. Jafni Md. Shukor	UMNO	48.36
Rengit	Dr. Mohd. Puad Zarkashi	UMNO	48.91
Tenggaroh	Raven Kumar S. Krishnasamy	MIC	49.10
Parit Raja	Nor Rashidah Ramli	UMNO	49.57
Pemanis	Anuar Abd. Manap	UMNO	49.81
Pekan Nanas	Tan Eng Meng	MCA	50.49
Pulai Sebatang	Hasrunizah Hassan	UMNO	50.56
Bekok	Tan Chong	MCA	51.31
Yong Peng	Ling Tian Soon	MCA	51.90
Layang-Layang	Abd. Mutalip Abd. Rahim	UMNO	55.00
Paloh	Lee Ting Han	MCA	55.05
Fairly safe
Machap	Onn Hafiz Ghazi	UMNO	56.64
Buloh Kasap	Zahari Sarip	UMNO	56.96
Panti	Hahasrin Hashim	UMNO	57.29
Pasir Raja	Rashidah Ismail	UMNO	58.21
Safe
Kukup	Jefridin Atan	UMNO	60.37
Sri Medan	Zulkurnain Kamisan	UMNO	60.52
Johor Lama	Norlizah Noh	UMNO	60.56
Sedili	Muszaide Makmor	UMNO	62.25
Kahang	Vidyanathan Ramanadhan	MIC	62.69
Benut	Ir. Hasni Mohammad	UMNO	63.08
Semarang	Samsol Bari Jamali	UMNO	63.21
Tanjung Surat	Aznan Tamin	UMNO	66.97
Penawar	Fauziah Misri	UMNO	66.98

NON-GOVERNMENT SEATS
Marginal
Maharani	Abdul Aziz Talib	PAS	35.97
Bukit Batu	Arthur Chiong Sen Sern	PKR	39.20
Tangkak	Eric Ee Chin Li	DAP	40.03
Jementah	Ng Kor Sim	DAP	40.92
Simpang Jeram	Salahuddin Ayub	AMANAH	40.94
Johor Jaya	Liow Cai Tung	DAP	41.74
Perling	Liew Chin Tong	DAP	42.50
Puteri Wangsa	Amira Aisya Abd. Aziz	MUDA	43.22
Bukit Kepong	Dr. Sahruddin Jamal	BERSATU	44.27
Stulang	Andrew Chen Kah Eng	DAP	44.84
Senai	Wong Bor Yang	DAP	51.75
Penggaram	Gan Peck Cheng	DAP	53.67
Endau	Alwiyah Talib	BERSATU	55.48
Fairly safe
Mengkibol	Chew Chong Sin	DAP	57.50
Skudai	Marina Ibrahim	DAP	58.53
Safe
Bentayan	Ng Yak Howe	DAP	64.53

Post-election pendulum

GOVERNMENT SEATS
Marginal
Maharani	Ashari Md Sarip	UMNO	38.93
Jementah	See Ann Giap	MCA	46.31
Bukit Batu	Kumaran Ramakrishnan	MIC	47.70
Perling	Pannir Selvam Paliksina Siwalinggam	MIC	48.99
Kemelah	Raven Kumar S. Krishnasamy	MIC	50.62
Endau	Alwiyah Talib	UMNO	51.62
Bukit Naning	Mohd Ghazali Sabari	UMNO	52.85
Johor Jaya	Chan San San	MCA	53.55
Fairly safe
Tenang	Mohd Azahar Ibrahim	UMNO	56.23
Tangkak	Haw Chin Teck	MCA	56.41
Bukit Pasir	Mohamad Fazli Mohamad Salleh	UMNO	57.54
Kota Iskandar	Pandak Ahmad	UMNO	58.43
Safe
Serom	Nadhirah Afiqah Abdull Rahim	UMNO	60.03
Tiram	Abdul Halim Suleiman	UMNO	60.11
Yong Peng	Ling Tian Soon	MCA	60.16
Senggarang	Mohd Yusla Ismail	UMNO	60.56
Sungai Balang	Selamat Takim	UMNO	60.81
Gambir	Sahrihan Jani	UMNO	61.01
Bukit Kepong	Ahmad Syar'e Yusof	UMNO	61.42
Parit Yaani	Najib Samuri	UMNO	62.02
Bekok	Tan Chong	MCA	63.16
Permas	Baharudin Mohamed Taib	UMNO	64.77
Kempas	Ramlee Bohani	UMNO	65.22
Paloh	Lee Ting Han	MCA	66.40
Mahkota	Syed Hussien Syed Abdullah	UMNO	66.52
Bukit Permai	Mohd Jafni Md Shukor	UMNO	67.18
Semerah	Mohd Fared Mohd Khalid	UMNO	66.96
Layang-Layang	Chua Jian Boon	MCA	67.17
Larkin	Mohd Hairi Mad Shah	UMNO	67.47
Pemanis	Anuar Abd Manap	UMNO	68.12
Parit Raja	Nor Rashidah Ramli	UMNO	69.20
Pulai Sebatang	Hasrunizah Hassan	UMNO	70.49
Kahang	Rugendran Vellayan	MIC	71.74
Buloh Kasap	Zahari Sarip	UMNO	72.04
Rengit	Zaidi Japar	UMNO	72.06
Pekan Nanas	Tan Eng Meng	MCA	72.23
Kukup	Md Israk Abdullah	UMNO	72.31
Tenggaroh	Mohd Youzaimi Yusof	UMNO	74.58
Pasir Raja	Adham Baba	UMNO	74.90
Sri Medan	Zulkurnain Kamisan	UMNO	75.55
Panti	Muhammad Naqib Md Ghazali	UMNO	76.55
Semarang	Samsolbari Jamali	UMNO	78.00
Johor Lama	Norlizah Noh	UMNO	79.89
Machap	Onn Hafiz Ghazi	UMNO	80.28
Penawar	Fauziah Misri	UMNO	82.12
Sedili	Muszaide Makmor	UMNO	85.18
Benut	Mohd Sumali Reduan	UMNO	86.89
Tanjung Surat	Aznan Tamin	UMNO	90.51

NON-GOVERNMENT SEATS
Marginal
Simpang Jeram	Nazri Abd Rahman	AMANAH	41.03
Stulang	Andrew Chen Kah Eng	DAP	47.32
Puteri Wangsa	Maszlee Malik	PKR	48.44
Senai	Wong Bor Yang	DAP	52.08
Penggaram	Felica Poh Rui Ling	DAP	54.61
Mengkibol	Chu Poh Yee	DAP	54.86
Fairly safe
Skudai	Kartiyaini Jeyapalan	DAP	58.74
Safe
Bentayan	Ng Yak Howe	DAP	64.07
