= Soraya Badaruddin =

Malaysian politician

Ayna Soraya Badaruddin, (born May 5, 1995) is a Malaysian politician and maritime engineer.

Popularly known by her nickname Akak Kapal (Ship Sister) she is a first-time contestant in the 2026 Johor State Election.

A deputy chief of Parti Keadilan Rakyatyoung women's wing Srikandi, she is the candidate of Pakatan Harapan (PH - PKR) for the Sungai Balang state seat in Muar, Johor.

== Career ==
She is a graduate in Maritime Engineering from the University of Southampton and also holds a Diploma in Shipping Management from the Netherlands Maritime Institute of Technology.

She is managing director of Akak Kapal Marine Service and has corporate experience within the strategic shipping, maritime, and oil and gas industries, having worked for Petronas.

As a candidate she has proposed structural reforms for the Sungai Balang constituency, traditionally considered an Umno stronghold. She attempted to unseat incumbent Selamat Takim but ultimately finished third in a three way contest behind Selamat and PAS candidate Muhammad Amin Sailan .

Her primary targets include upgrading infrastructure in coastal hubs like Parit Jawa and Pantai Leka. She plans to introduce modern technology, improve boat landing facilities, and revamp local jetties to maximize fishermen's catch yields while cutting operations costs.

She is also an outspoken advocate of affirmative action in order to ensure greater female participation in politics.
