= Batu Pahat (federal constituency) =

Federal constituency in Johor, Malaysia

Batu Pahat (P150)
Johor constituency

Federal constituency
- Legislature: Dewan Rakyat
- MP: Onn Abu Bakar; PH
- Constituency created: 1955
- First contested: 1955
- Last contested: 2022

Demographics
- Population (2020): 166,000
- Electors (2026): 136,478
- Area (km²): 446
- Pop. density (per km²): 372.2

Batu Pahat is a federal constituency in Batu Pahat District, Johor, Malaysia, that has been represented in the Dewan Rakyat since 1955.

The federal constituency was created in the 1955 redistribution and is mandated to return a single member to the Dewan Rakyat under the first past the post voting system.

== Demographics ==
Ethnic breakdown of Batu Pahat's electorate as of 2026
1. Malay (52.3%)
2. Chinese (44.3%)
3. Indian (1.40%)
4. Other ethnicities (2.00%)

As of 2020, Batu Pahat has a population of 166,000 people.

Age breakdown of Batu Pahat's electorate as of 2022
1. 18-20 (5.64%)
2. 21-29 (20.3%)
3. 30-39 (21.6%)
4. 40-49 (16.9%)
5. 50-59 (15.0%)
6. 60-69 (11.4%)
7. 70-79 (6.34%)
8. 80-89 (2.34%)
9. above 90 (0.45%)
Gender breakdown of Batu Pahat's electorate as of 2022
1. Male (49.5%)
2. Female (50.5%)

== History ==
=== Polling districts ===
According to the gazette issued on 2 July 2026, the Batu Pahat constituency has a total of 44 polling districts.

State constituency	Polling District	Code	Location
Penggaram (N23)	Parit Bilal	150/23/01	SA Parit Bilal; SK Parit Bilal
Penggaram (N23)	Linau	150/23/02	SA Bukit Pasir
Penggaram (N23)	Bakau Condong	150/23/03	SK Parit Lapis
Penggaram (N23)	Bukit Pasir	150/23/04	SJK (C) Chern Hwa Bukit Pasir
Penggaram (N23)	Bakau Condong Barat	150/23/05	SK Convent Batu Pahat; SMK Convent
Penggaram (N23)	Kampung Kenangan Dato' Onn	150/23/06	SA Kenangan Dato' Onn
Penggaram (N23)	Gunung Soga	150/23/07	SJK (T) Seri Pelangi Gunung Soga; SA Taman Bukit Perdana; SK Tengku Mariam
Penggaram (N23)	Kampong Merdeka Timor	150/23/08	SMK Datin Onn Jaaffar
Penggaram (N23)	Kampong Merdeka Barat	150/23/09	Taman Kanak-Kanak Dawning
Penggaram (N23)	Jalan Zabedah Barat	150/23/10	Tadika Agape
Penggaram (N23)	Jalan Abu Bakar	150/23/11	SJK (C) Ai Chun (1); SJK (C) Ai Chun (2)
Penggaram (N23)	Jalan Zabedah Timor	150/23/12	SMK (P) Temenggong Ibrahim
Penggaram (N23)	Simpang Rantai	150/23/13	SK Temenggong Ibrahim Penggaram
Penggaram (N23)	Bentara Luar	150/23/14	SMK Dato' Bentara Luar; SK Lim Poon (1)
Penggaram (N23)	Bukit Bendera	150/23/15	SMK Dato' Syed Esa; SJK (C) Hwa Jin
Penggaram (N23)	Taman Soga	150/23/16	SMK Tinggi Batu Pahat; SK Montfront
Penggaram (N23)	Kampung Istana	150/23/17	SA Kampung Istana
Penggaram (N23)	Taman Murni	150/23/18	SRA Bersepadu Batu Pahat
Senggarang (N24)	Minyak Beku	150/24/01	SK Minyak Beku
Senggarang (N24)	Petani Kechik	150/24/02	SJK (C) Ping Ming
Senggarang (N24)	Banang	150/24/03	SK Banang Jaya
Senggarang (N24)	Sungai Ayam	150/24/04	SK Seri Banang
Senggarang (N24)	Sungai Suloh	150/24/05	SK Sg. Suloh
Senggarang (N24)	Koris	150/24/06	SK Koris
Senggarang (N24)	Parit Tariman	150/24/07	SK Seri Molek
Senggarang (N24)	Parit Kadir	150/24/08	SK Parit Kadir
Senggarang (N24)	Parit Kemang	150/24/09	SK Parit Kemang
Senggarang (N24)	Sungai Lurus	150/25/10	SK Senggarang
Senggarang (N24)	Bandar Senggarang Barat	150/24/11	SMK Senggarang
Senggarang (N24)	Bandar Senggarang Timor	150/24/12	SJK (C) Chong Hwa Senggarang
Senggarang (N24)	Senggarang	150/24/13	SA Senggarang
Senggarang (N24)	Kampong Bahru	150/24/14	SK Kg Bahru
Senggarang (N24)	Taman Senggarang	150/24/15	SA Koris
Rengit (N25)	Rejo Sari	150/25/01	SK Seri Rejo Sari
Rengit (N25)	Perpat	150/25/02	SK Seri Perpat
Rengit (N25)	Sri Ladang	150/25/03	SK Seri Ladang
Rengit (N25)	Seri Merlong	150/25/04	SK Seri Merlong
Rengit (N25)	Belahan Tampok	150/25/05	SK Seri Belahan
Rengit (N25)	Sungai Merlong	150/25/06	SK Mutiara
Rengit (N25)	Sungai Kluang	150/25/07	SK Rengit
Rengit (N25)	Bandar Rengit Selatan	150/25/08	SMK Permata Jaya
Rengit (N25)	Bandar Rengit Utara	150/25/09	SMK Tun Sardon
Rengit (N25)	Rengit	150/25/10	SJK (C) Chong Hwa Rengit
Rengit (N25)	Punggot	150/25/11	SK Seri Sampurna

=== Representation history ===
Members of Parliament for Batu Pahat
Parliament	No	Years	Member	Party	Vote Share
Constituency created
Federal Legislative Council
1st		1955–1957	S Chelvasingam Maclunthlyre (எஸ் செல்வலிங்கம் மச்லுந்த்லிரே)	Alliance (MIC)	18,968; 87.47%
1st		1957–1959	Syed Esa Alwee (سيد عيسى علوي)	Alliance (UMNO)	12,179; 62.48%
Parliament of the Federation of Malaya					
1st	P093	1959–1963	Kang Kok Seng (江国盛)	Alliance (MCA)	10,261; 67.96%
Parliament of Malaysia					
1st	P093	1963–1964	Kang Kok Seng (江国盛)	Alliance (MCA)	10,261; 67.96%
2nd	P093	1964–1969	Soh Ah Teck (苏宜德)	Alliance (MCA)	12,505; 60.78%
		1969–1971	Parliament was suspended		
3rd	P093	1971–1973	Soh Ah Teck (苏宜德)	Alliance (MCA)	Uncontested
3rd	P093	1973–1974	Soh Ah Teck (苏宜德)	BN (MCA)	Uncontested
4th	P111	1974–1978	Abdul Jalal Abu Bakar (عبدالجلال أبو بكر)	BN (UMNO)	15,139; 61.75%
5th	P111	1978–1982	Abdul Jalal Abu Bakar (عبدالجلال أبو بكر)	BN (UMNO)	Uncontested
6th	P111	1982–1986	Daud Taha (داود طه)	BN (UMNO)	30,220; 88.03%
7th	P125	1986–1990	Daud Taha (داود طه)	BN (UMNO)	23,384; 67.81%
8th	P125	1990–1995	Daud Taha (داود طه)	BN (UMNO)	24,922; 58.81%
9th	P135	1995–1999	Mansor Masikon (منصور ماسيكون)	BN (UMNO)	33,780; 79.36%
10th	P135	1999–2004	Siam Kasrin (صيام قصرين)	BN (UMNO)	31,674; 69.01%
11th	P150	2004–2008	Junaidy Abdul Wahab (جنيدي عبدالوهاب)	BN (UMNO)	38,982; 79.78%
12th	P150	2008–2013	Mohd Puad Zarkashi (محمد ڤؤاد زرکشي)	BN (UMNO)	32,593; 62.42%
13th	P150	2013–2015	Mohd Idris Jusi (محمد إدريس جوسي)	PR (PKR)	38,563; 51.01%
13th	P150	2015–2018	Mohd Idris Jusi (محمد إدريس جوسي)	PH (PKR)	38,563; 51.01%
14th	P150	2018–2020	Mohd Rashid Hasnon (محمد راشد بن حسنون)	PH (PKR)	45,929; 55.92%
14th	P150	2020–2022	Mohd Rashid Hasnon (محمد راشد بن حسنون)	PN (BERSATU)	45,929; 55.92%
15th	P150	2022–present	Onn Abu Bakar (عون أبو بكر)	PH (PKR)	45,242; 45.47%

=== State constituency ===
Parliamentary constituency	State constituency						
Parliamentary constituency	1954–59*	1959–1974	1974–1986	1986–1995	1995–2004	2004–2018	2018–present
Batu Pahat		Bandar Penggaram					
Batu Pahat	Batu Pahat Central						
Batu Pahat	Batu Pahat Coastal						
Batu Pahat		Broleh					
Batu Pahat				Penggaram			
Batu Pahat			Rengit				
Batu Pahat						Senggarang	

=== Historical boundaries ===
State Constituency	Area					
State Constituency	1959	1974	1984	1994	2003	2018
Bandar Penggaram	Batu Pahat; Koris; Minyak Beku; Penggaram; Teluk Buloh	Batu Pahat; Koris; Minyak Beku; Penggaram; Sri Gading				
Broleh	Broleh; Peserai; Taman Desa; Taman Gembira; Taman Sri Saga					
Penggaram			Batu Pahat; Koris; Minyak Beku; Penggaram; Taman Bilal		Batu Pahat; Kampung Merdeka; Penggaram; Taman Bilal; Taman Mewah	
Rengit		Kampung Belahan Tampok; Kampung Parit Enjin; Perpat; Rengit; Sungai Dulang	Kampung Belahan Tampok; Kampung Simpang Enam; Perpat; Rengit; Senggarang		Kampung Belahan Tampok; Kampung Simpang Enam; Perpat; Rengit; Taman Dato Jalal	
Senggarang					Koris; Minyak Beku; Parit Kadir; Parit Tariman; Senggarang	

=== Current state assembly members ===
No.	State Constituency	Member	Coalition (Party)
N23	Penggaram	Felicia Poh Rui Ling	PH (DAP)
N24	Senggarang	Mohd Yusla Ismail	BN (UMNO)
N25	Rengit	Zaidi Japar	BN (UMNO)

=== Local governments & postcodes ===
No.	State Constituency	Local Government	Postcode
N23	Penggaram	Batu Pahat Municipal Council	83000 Batu Pahat; 83100 Rengit; 83200 Senggarang; 83300 Sri Gading
N24	Senggarang	Batu Pahat Municipal Council	83000 Batu Pahat; 83100 Rengit; 83200 Senggarang; 83300 Sri Gading
N25	Rengit	Batu Pahat Municipal Council	83000 Batu Pahat; 83100 Rengit; 83200 Senggarang; 83300 Sri Gading

== Election results ==
Malaysian general election, 2022
Party	Candidate	Votes	%	∆%
PH	Onn Abu Bakar	45,242	45.47	▲45.47
PN	Mohd Rashid Hasnon	29,270	29.42	▲29.42
BN	Ishak @ Mohd Farid Siraj	24,309	24.43	▼9.70
PEJUANG	Nizam Bashir Abdul Kariem Bashier	410	0.41	▲0.41
Parti Rakyat Malaysia	Zahari Osman	263	0.26	▲0.26
Total valid votes		99,494	100.00	
Total rejected ballots		846		
Unreturned ballots		339		
Turnout		100,679	75.20	▼9.61
Registered electors		133,910		
Majority		15,972	16.05	▼5.74
PH hold		Swing		
Source(s) https://lom.agc.gov.my/ilims/upload/portal/akta/outputp/1753254/PUB%20617%20PARLIMEN%20JOHOR.pdf

Malaysian general election, 2018
Party	Candidate	Votes	%	∆%
PKR	Mohd Rashid Hasnon	45,929	55.92	▲4.91
BN	Haliza Abdullah	28,035	34.13	▼15.86
PAS	Mahfodz Mohamed	8,173	9.95	▲9.95
Total valid votes		82,137	100.00	
Total rejected ballots		1,097		
Unreturned ballots		340		
Turnout		83,574	84.81	▼2.65
Registered electors		98,543		
Majority		17,894	21.79	▲19.77
PKR hold		Swing		
Source(s) "His Majesty's Government Gazette - Notice of Contested Election, Parliament for the State of Johore [P.U. (B) 244/2018]" (PDF). Attorney General's Chambers of Malaysia. 3 May 2018. Archived from the original (PDF) on 29 December 2019. "Federal Government Gazette - Results of Contested Election and Statements of the Poll after the Official Addition of Votes, Parliamentary Constituencies for the State of Johore [P.U. (B) 318/2018]" (PDF). Attorney General's Chambers of Malaysia. 28 May 2018.

Malaysian general election, 2013
Party	Candidate	Votes	%	∆%
PKR	Mohd Idris Jusi	38,563	51.01	▲13.43
BN	Mohd Puad Zarkashi	37,039	48.99	▼13.43
Total valid votes		75,602	100.00	
Total rejected ballots		1,445		
Unreturned ballots		155		
Turnout		77,202	87.46	▲10.25
Registered electors		88,272		
Majority		1,524	2.02	▼22.82
PKR gain from BN		Swing		?
Source(s) "Federal Government Gazette - Notice of Contested Election, Parliament for the State of Johore [P.U. (B) 181/2013]" (PDF). Attorney General's Chambers of Malaysia. 26 April 2013. "Federal Government Gazette - Results of Contested Election and Statements of the Poll after the Official Addition of Votes, Parliamentary Constituencies for the State of Johore [P.U. (B) 222/2013]" (PDF). Attorney General's Chambers of Malaysia. 22 May 2013.

Malaysian general election, 2008
Party	Candidate	Votes	%	∆%
BN	Mohd Puad Zarkashi	32,593	62.42	▼17.36
PKR	Muhammad Abdullah	19,625	37.58	▲37.58
Total valid votes		52,218	100.00	
Total rejected ballots		1,758		
Unreturned ballots		127		
Turnout		54,103	77.21	▲3.78
Registered electors		70,069		
Majority		12,968	24.84	▼34.72
BN hold		Swing		

Malaysian general election, 2004
Party	Candidate	Votes	%	∆%
BN	Junaidy Abdul Wahab	38,982	79.78	▲10.77
PAS	Mohamed Hanipa Maidin	9,880	20.22	▼10.77
Total valid votes		48,862	100.00	
Total rejected ballots		1,372		
Unreturned ballots		0		
Turnout		50,234	73.43	▼0.22
Registered electors				
Majority		29,102	59.56	▲21.54
BN hold		Swing		

Malaysian general election, 1999
Party	Candidate	Votes	%	∆%
BN	Siam Kasrin	31,674	69.01	▼10.35
PAS	Mohd Ramli Md Kari	14,226	30.99	▲30.99
Total valid votes		45,900	100.00	
Total rejected ballots		1,197		
Unreturned ballots		79		
Turnout		47,176	73.65	▲0.98
Registered electors				
Majority		17,448	38.02	▼20.70
BN hold		Swing		

Malaysian general election, 1995
Party	Candidate	Votes	%	∆%
BN	Mansor Masikon	33,780	79.36	▲20.55
S46	Abdullah @ Ali Siran	8,787	20.64	▼20.55
Total valid votes		42,567	100.00	
Total rejected ballots		2,395		
Unreturned ballots		136		
Turnout		45,098	72.67	▼1.10
Registered electors				
Majority		24,993	58.72	▲41.10
BN hold		Swing		

Malaysian general election, 1990
Party	Candidate	Votes	%	∆%
BN	Daud Taha	24,922	58.81	▼9.00
S46	Sh. Rokiah Sh. Cantik	17,457	41.19	▲41.19
Total valid votes		42,379	100.00	
Total rejected ballots		1,764		
Unreturned ballots		0		
Turnout		44,143	73.77	▲3.37
Registered electors		59,836		
Majority		7,465	17.62	▼27.48
BN hold		Swing		

Malaysian general election, 1986
Party	Candidate	Votes	%	∆%
BN	Daud Taha	23,384	67.81	▼20.22
SDP	Tan Lem Huat	7,830	22.71	▲22.71
PAS	Ungku Mohd Noor Ungku Mahmood	3,269	9.48	▼2.49
Total valid votes		34,483	100.00	
Total rejected ballots		4,534		
Unreturned ballots		0		
Turnout		39,017	70.40	▼4.08
Registered electors		55,418		
Majority		15,554	45.10	▼30.96
BN hold		Swing		

Malaysian general election, 1982
Party	Candidate	Votes	%	∆%
BN	Daud Taha	30,220	88.03	▲88.03
PAS	Ibrahim Tahir	4,111	11.97	▲11.97
Total valid votes		34,331	100.00	
Total rejected ballots		1,830		
Unreturned ballots		0		
Turnout		36,161	74.48	
Registered electors		48,552		
Majority		26,109	76.06	
BN hold		Swing		

Malaysian general election, 1978
Party	Candidate	Votes	%	∆%
On the nomination day, Abdul Jalal Abu Bakar won uncontested.
BN	Abdul Jalal Abu Bakar			
Total valid votes			100.00	
Total rejected ballots				
Unreturned ballots				
Turnout				
Registered electors				
Majority				
BN hold		Swing		

Malaysian general election, 1974
Party	Candidate	Votes	%	∆%
BN	Abdul Jalal Abu Bakar	15,139	61.75	▲61.75
Independent	Mohamed Kassim	5,768	23.53	▲23.53
DAP	Ho Lai Chon	3,611	14.73	
Total valid votes		24,518	100.00	
Total rejected ballots		1,003		
Unreturned ballots		0		
Turnout		25,521	73.22	
Registered electors		34,853		
Majority		9,371	38.22	
BN gain from Alliance		Swing		?

Malaysian general election, 1969
Party	Candidate	Votes	%	∆%
On the nomination day, Soh Ah Teck won uncontested.
Alliance	Soh Ah Teck			
Total valid votes			100.00	
Total rejected ballots				
Unreturned ballots				
Turnout				
Registered electors		27,010		
Majority				
Alliance hold		Swing		

Malaysian general election, 1964
Party	Candidate	Votes	%	∆%
Alliance	Soh Ah Teck	12,505	60.78	▼7.18
Socialist Front	Ng Jin Lam	5,647	27.45	▲27.45
UDP	Tan Seow Kiew	2,422	11.77	▲11.77
Total valid votes		20,574	100.00	
Total rejected ballots		450		
Unreturned ballots		0		
Turnout		21,024	82.91	▲10.80
Registered electors		25,358		
Majority		6,858	33.33	▼8.42
Alliance hold		Swing		

Malayan general election, 1959
Party	Candidate	Votes	%	∆%
Alliance	Kang Kok Seng	10,261	67.96	▲5.47
Independent	Koh Kim Boon	3,958	26.21	▲26.21
Independent	Abdullah Othman	880	5.83	▲5.83
Total valid votes		15,099	100.00	
Total rejected ballots		108		
Unreturned ballots		0		
Turnout		15,207	72.11	▲3.71
Registered electors		21,090		
Majority		6,303	41.75	▲8.07
Alliance hold		Swing		

Malaysian general by-election, 14 December 1957 Upon the resignation of incumbent, S. C. Macintyre
Party	Candidate	Votes	%	∆%
Alliance	Syed Esa Alwee	12,179	62.48	▼24.99
National Party	Onn Jaafar	5,614	28.80	▲16.27
Rakyat	Abdul Ghani Hashim	1,377	7.06	▲7.06
Total valid votes		19,493		
Total rejected ballots		323		
Unreturned ballots		0		
Turnout		19,816	68.40	▼11.90
Registered electors		28,971		
Majority		6,535	33.68	▼41.26
Alliance hold		Swing		

Malayan general election, 1955
Party	Candidate	Votes	%
Alliance	S. C. Macintyre	18,968	87.47
National Party	Syed Abdul Kadir	2,717	12.53
Total valid votes		21,685	100.00
Total rejected ballots			
Unreturned ballots			
Turnout		21,685	80.30
Registered electors		27,005	
Majority		16,251	74.94
This was a new constituency created.
Source(s): The Straits Times.
