= Sungai Balang (state constituency) =

State constituency in Johor, Malaysia

Sungai Balang (N16)
Johor constituency

State constituency
- Legislature: Johor State Legislative Assembly
MLA
Selamat Takim
BN
- Constituency created: 1994
- First contested: 1995
- Last contested: 2026

Demographics
- Population (): 40,414
- Electors (2026): 31,039
- Area (km²): 203

Sungai Balang is a state constituency in Johor, Malaysia, that is represented in the Johor State Legislative Assembly.

The state constituency was first contested in 1995 and is mandated to return a single Assemblyman to the Johor State Legislative Assembly under the first-past-the-post voting system.

== Demographics ==
As of 2020, Sungai Balang has a population of 40,414 people.

Ethnic breakdown of Sungai Balang's electorate as of 2026
1. Malay (73.9%)
2. Chinese (25.1%)
3. Other ethnicities (0.60%)
4. Indian (0.50%)

== History ==
=== Polling districts ===
According to the federal gazette issued on 2 July 2026, the Sungai Balang constituency has a total of 19 polling districts.

| State constituency | Polling Districts | Code | Location |
|---|---|---|---|
| Sungai Balang (N16) | Parit Shafiee | 146/16/01 | Balai Raya Kampung Parit Salman; Balai Raya Kampung Parit Shafiee |
| Sungai Balang (N16) | Parit Kassim | 146/16/02 | SJK (C) Limbong |
| Sungai Balang (N16) | Bukit Mor | 146/16/03 | SJK (C) Hwa Ming |
| Sungai Balang (N16) | Parit Nawee | 146/16/04 | SK Parit Nawi |
| Sungai Balang (N16) | Bandar Parit Jawa Utara | 146/16/05 | SK Parit Jawa |
| Sungai Balang (N16) | Bandar Parit Jawa Selatan | 146/16/06 | SJK (C) Chin Kwang Wahyu |
| Sungai Balang (N16) | Parit Jawa | 146/16/07 | SMK Raja Muda |
| Sungai Balang (N16) | Parit Tengah | 146/16/08 | SK Sri Jamil |
| Sungai Balang (N16) | Parit Jamil Darat | 146/16/09 | SK Simpang 4 |
| Sungai Balang (N16) | Parit Pechah | 146/16/10 | SMK Sri Menanti |
| Sungai Balang (N16) | Sri Menanti | 146/16/11 | SK Seri Menanti |
| Sungai Balang (N16) | Sungai Sudah | 146/16/12 | SK Tanjong Tohor |
| Sungai Balang (N16) | Sungai Balang | 146/16/13 | SK Orangkaya Ali |
| Sungai Balang (N16) | Sungai Balang Besar | 146/16/14 | SK Jalan Yusof |
| Sungai Balang (N16) | Sungai Balang Darat | 146/16/15 | SK Sg Balang Darat |
| Sungai Balang (N16) | Sarang Buaya Darat | 146/16/16 | SK Parit Latiff |
| Sungai Balang (N16) | Parit Yusof | 146/16/17 | SMK Pekan Baru Muar |
| Sungai Balang (N16) | Sarang Buaya Laut | 146/16/18 | SJK (C) Pei Chun |
| Sungai Balang (N16) | Kampong Parit Bulat | 146/16/19 | SK Parit Bulat |

=== Representation history ===
Members of the Legislative Assembly for Sungai Balang
| Assembly | No | Years | Member | Party |
Constituency created from Parit Jawa, Parit Bakar and Bukit Naning
| 9th | N18 | 1995-1999 | Muntaha Kailan | BN (UMNO) |
| 10th | N18 | 1999-2004 | Md Salikon Sarpin | BN (UMNO) |
| 11th | N16 | 2004-2008 | Robia Kosai | BN (UMNO) |
| 12th | N16 | 2008-2013 | Robia Kosai | BN (UMNO) |
| 13th | N16 | 2013–2018 | Zaiton Ismail | BN (UMNO) |
| 14th | N16 | 2018-2022 | Zaiton Ismail | BN (UMNO) |
| 15th | N16 | 2022–2026 | Selamat Takim | BN (UMNO) |
| 16th | N16 | 2026–present | Selamat Takim | BN (UMNO) |

== Election results ==
Johor state election, 2026
| Party | Candidate | Votes | % | ∆% |
|---|---|---|---|---|
| BN | Selamat Takim | 13,908 | 60.81 | ▲15.24 |
| PN | Muhammad Amin Sailan | 4,982 | 21.78 | ▼11.19 |
| PH | Soraya Badaruddin | 3,980 | 17.40 | ▲17.40 |
| Total valid votes | | 22,870 | 100.00 | |
| Total rejected ballots | | 185 | | |
| Unreturned ballots | | 27 | | |
| Turnout | | 23,082 | 74.36 | ▲12.53 |
| Registered electors | | 31,039 | | |
| Majority | | 8,926 | 39.03 | ▲26.43 |
| BN hold | | Swing | | |

Johor state election, 2022
| Party | Candidate | Votes | % | ∆% |
|---|---|---|---|---|
| BN | Selamat Takim | 8,294 | 45.57 | ▲3.39 |
| PN | Zainuddin Sayuti | 6,001 | 32.97 | ▲32.97 |
| PKR | Abdullah Sahid | 3,576 | 19.65 | ▼21.62 |
| PEJUANG | Intan Nadira Shafika | 329 | 1.81 | ▲1.81 |
| Total valid votes | | 18,200 | 100.00 | |
| Total rejected ballots | | 331 | | |
| Unreturned ballots | | 93 | | |
| Turnout | | 18,624 | 61.83 | ▼23.03 |
| Registered electors | | 30,121 | | |
| Majority | | 2,293 | 12.60 | ▲11.68 |
| BN hold | | Swing | | |

Johor state election, 2018
| Party | Candidate | Votes | % | ∆% |
|---|---|---|---|---|
| BN | Zaiton Ismail | 8,022 | 42.19 | ▼12.41 |
| PKR | Na'Im Jusri | 7,848 | 41.27 | ▲41.27 |
| PAS | Cheman Yusoh | 3,146 | 16.54 | ▼28.86 |
| Total valid votes | | 19,016 | 100.00 | |
| Total rejected ballots | | 392 | | |
| Unreturned ballots | | 62 | | |
| Turnout | | 19,470 | 84.86 | ▼1.55 |
| Registered electors | | 22,943 | | |
| Majority | | 174 | 0.92 | ▼8.27 |
| BN hold | | Swing | | |

Johor state election, 2013
| Party | Candidate | Votes | % | ∆% |
|---|---|---|---|---|
| BN | Zaiton Ismail | 9,716 | 54.59 | ▼2.98 |
| PAS | Malik Mohamed Diah | 8,081 | 45.41 | ▲2.98 |
| Total valid votes | | 17,797 | 100.00 | |
| Total rejected ballots | | 408 | | |
| Unreturned ballots | | 44 | | |
| Turnout | | 18,249 | 86.41 | ▲10.67 |
| Registered electors | | 21,118 | | |
| Majority | | 1,635 | 9.19 | ▼5.97 |
| BN hold | | Swing | | |

Johor state election, 2008
| Party | Candidate | Votes | % | ∆% |
|---|---|---|---|---|
| BN | Robia Kosai | 7,667 | 57.58 | ▼15.93 |
| PAS | Malik Mohamed Diah | 5,649 | 42.42 | ▲15.93 |
| Total valid votes | | 13,316 | 100.00 | |
| Total rejected ballots | | 391 | | |
| Unreturned ballots | | 15 | | |
| Turnout | | 13,722 | 75.74 | ▲2.91 |
| Registered electors | | 18,117 | | |
| Majority | | 2,018 | 15.15 | ▼31.86 |
| BN hold | | Swing | | |

Johor state election, 2004
| Party | Candidate | Votes | % | ∆% |
|---|---|---|---|---|
| BN | Robia Kosai | 9,701 | 73.51 | ▲8.46 |
| PAS | Malik Mohamed Diah | 3,496 | 26.49 | ▼8.46 |
| Total valid votes | | 13,197 | 100.00 | |
| Total rejected ballots | | 377 | | |
| Unreturned ballots | | 19 | | |
| Turnout | | 13,593 | 72.83 | ▲0.40 |
| Registered electors | | 18,664 | | |
| Majority | | 6,205 | 47.02 | ▲16.93 |
| BN hold | | Swing | | |

Johor state election, 1999
| Party | Candidate | Votes | % | ∆% |
|---|---|---|---|---|
| BN | Md. Salikon Sarpin | 8,484 | 65.05 | ▼10.62 |
| PAS | Mohamad Taib | 4,559 | 34.95 | ▲10.62 |
| Total valid votes | | 13,043 | 100.00 | |
| Total rejected ballots | | 483 | | |
| Unreturned ballots | | 3 | | |
| Turnout | | 13,529 | 72.43 | ▲0.65 |
| Registered electors | | 18,680 | | |
| Majority | | 3,925 | 30.09 | ▼21.23 |
| BN hold | | Swing | | |

Johor state election, 1995
| Party | Candidate | Votes | % |
|---|---|---|---|
| BN | Muntaha Kailan | 9,566 | 75.66 |
| PAS | Musa Abdul Rahim | 3,077 | 24.34 |
| Total valid votes | | 12,643 | 100.00 |
| Total rejected ballots | | 591 | |
| Unreturned ballots | | 41 | |
| Turnout | | 13,275 | 71.77 |
| Registered electors | | 18,496 | |
| Majority | | 6,489 | 51.32 |
This was a new constituency created.
