= Khairuddin Abdul Rahim =

Malaysian politician

- خير الدين عبدالرحيم

Member of the Johor State Legislative Assembly for Senggarang
- In office 9 May 2018 – 12 March 2022
- Preceded by: A. Aziz Ismail (BN–UMNO)
- Succeeded by: Mohd Yusla Ismail (BN–UMNO)
- Majority: 809 (2018)

Personal details
- Born: Khairuddin bin Abdul Rahim; 23 April 1959 (age 67) Batu Pahat, Johor, Federation of Malaya (now Malaysia)
- Citizenship: Malaysian
- Party: Malaysian Islamic Party (PAS) (–2015); National Trust Party (AMANAH) (2015–2021); People's Justice Party (PKR) (since 2021)
- Other political affiliations: Pakatan Rakyat (PR) (–2015); Pakatan Harapan (PH) (since 2015)
- Spouse: Noraini Aman
- Occupation: Politician

Khairuddin bin Abdul Rahim (born 23 April 1959) is a Malaysian politician who served as Member of the Johor State Legislative Assembly (MLA) for Senggarang from May 2018 to March 2022. He is a member of the People's Justice Party (PKR), a component party of the Pakatan Harapan (PH) coalition and was a member of the National Trust Party (AMANAH), another component party of the PH coalition and was a member of the Malaysian Islamic Party (PAS), a component party of formerly the Pakatan Rakyat (PR) coalition.

== Politics ==
He contested for the Parit Sulong parliamentary seat on the ticket of PAS in the 2013 Malaysian general election but lost it. After that, he joined AMANAH and successfully won the Senggarang seat against the UMNO candidate with a small majority. He was the secretary for AMANAH Johor before joining PKR on 27 February 2021.

== Election results ==
Parliament of Malaysia
Year	Constituency	Candidate	Votes	Pct.	Opponent(s)	Votes	Pct.	Ballots cast	Majority	Turnout
2013	P147 Parit Sulong	Khairuddin Abdul Rahim (PAS)	18,505	37.12%	Noraini Ahmad (UMNO)	30,258	60.69%	49,855	11,753	87.62%

Johor State Legislative Assembly
Year	Constituency	Candidate	Votes	Pct.	Opponent(s)	Votes	Pct.	Ballots cast	Majority	Turnout
2018	N24 Senggarang	Khairuddin Abdul Rahim (AMANAH)	10,568	44.98%	Zaidi Japar (UMNO)	9,759	41.54%	29,039	809	80.29%
2018	N24 Senggarang	Khairuddin Abdul Rahim (AMANAH)	10,568	44.98%	Mohd Ramli Md Kari (PAS)	2,699	11.49%	29,039	809	80.29%
2022	N25 Rengit	Khairuddin Abdul Rahim (PKR)	2,065	12.44%	Mohd Puad Zarkashi (UMNO)	7,903	47.61%	16,598	1,920	61.20%
2022	N25 Rengit	Khairuddin Abdul Rahim (PKR)	2,065	12.44%	Mohammad Huzair Lajis (BERSATU)	5,983	36.05%	16,598	1,920	61.20%
2022	N25 Rengit	Khairuddin Abdul Rahim (PKR)	2,065	12.44%	Nizam Bashir Abdul Kariem Bashir (PEJUANG)	206	1.24%	16,598	1,920	61.20%
