= Panti (state constituency) =

Political subdivision in Malaysia

Panti (N34)
Johor constituency

State constituency
- Legislature: Johor State Legislative Assembly
MLA
Muhammad Naqib Md Ghazali
BN
- Constituency created: 1994
- First contested: 1995
- Last contested: 2026

Demographics
- Population (2020): 54,133
- Electors (2026): 41,407
- Area (km²): 802

Panti is a state constituency in Johor, Malaysia, that is represented in the Johor State Legislative Assembly.

The state constituency was first contested in 1995 and is mandated to return a single Assemblyman to the Johor State Legislative Assembly under the first-past-the-post voting system.

== Demographics ==
As of 2020, Panti has a population of 54,133 people.

Ethnic breakdown of Panti's electorate as of 2026
1. Malay (77.8%)
2. Chinese (13.8%)
3. Indians (5.60%)
4. Other ethnicities (2.80%)

== History ==
=== Polling districts ===
According to the gazette issued on 2 July 2026, the Panti constituency has a total of 13 polling districts.

State constituency	Polling districts	Code	Location
Panti（N34）	Bandar Tenggara Utara	155/34/01	SK Bandar Tenggara 1
Panti（N34）	FELDA Pengeli Timor	155/34/02	SK FELDA Pengeli Timor
Panti（N34）	Sungai Sibol	155/34/03	SK FELDA Sungai Sibol
Panti（N34）	Linggiu	155/34/04	SK (FELDA) Linggiu
Panti（N34）	Ulu Sungai Johor	155/34/05	SK Semanggar
Panti（N34）	Pelepah Valley	155/34/06	Dewan Seri Teratai
Panti（N34）	Bukit Lintang	155/34/07	SK Bukit Lintang
Panti（N34）	Kampong Lukut	155/34/08	Dewan Semerah Padi Kampung Lukut Kota Tinggi; Balai Aktiviti Komuniti Kg. Lukut
Panti（N34）	Kota Tinggi Utara	155/34/09	SMK Bandar; SMK Taman Kota Jaya
Panti（N34）	Bandar Tenggara Selatan	155/34/10	SK Bandar Tenggara 2
Panti（N34）	Kampong Kelantan	155/34/11	SJK (C) Pei Hwa
Panti（N34）	Kota Jaya Utara	155/34/12	SMK Taman Kota Jaya; SA Taman Kota Jaya; SMA (Arab) Kota Tinggi
Panti（N34）	Kota Jaya Selatan	155/34/13	SK Taman Kota Jaya; SA Taman Kota Jaya

=== Representation history ===
Members of the Legislative Assembly for Panti
Assembly	No	Years	Member	Party
Constituency created from Sedili and Bandar Tenggara
9th	N23	1995–1999	Asamon Ismail	BN (UMNO)
10th	N23	1999–2004	Mohamad Ameran Sohiran	BN (UMNO)
11th	N34	2004–2008	Baderi Dasuki	BN (UMNO)
12th	N34	2008–2013	Baderi Dasuki	BN (UMNO)
13th	N34	2013–2018	Baderi Dasuki	BN (UMNO)
14th	N34	2018–2022	Hahasrin Hashim	BN (UMNO)
15th	N34	2022–2026	Hahasrin Hashim	BN (UMNO)
15th	N34	2026–present	Muhammad Naqib Md Ghazali	BN (UMNO)

== Election results ==
Johor state election, 2026
Party	Candidate	Votes	%	∆%
BN	Mohd Naqib Mohd Ghazali	22,823	76.55	▲19.26
PH	Ahmad Daniel Sharudin	3,875	13.00	▲2.48
PN	Mohamad Alias Rasman	3,115	10.45	▼20.22
Total valid votes		29,813	100.00	
Total rejected ballots		378		
Unreturned ballots		32		
Turnout		30,223	72.99	▲14.58
Registered electors		41,407		
Majority		18,948	63.56	▲36.94
BN hold		Swing		

Johor state election, 2022
Party	Candidate	Votes	%	∆%
BN	Hahasrin Hashim	12,599	57.29	▲4.14
PN	Hassan Rasid	6,745	30.67	▲30.67
PH	Ahmad Daniel	2,314	10.52	▼26.68
PEJUANG	Ahmade Mohd Din	334	1.58	▲1.58
Total valid votes		21,992	98.03	
Total rejected ballots		341	1.52	
Unreturned ballots		102	0.45	
Turnout		22,435	58.41	▼26.52
Registered electors		38,408		
Majority		5,854	26.62	▲10.67
BN hold		Swing		
Source(s) "RESULTS OF CONTESTED ELECTION AND STATEMENTS OF THE POLL AFTER THE OFFICIAL ADDITION OF VOTES" (PDF).

Johor state election, 2018
Party	Candidate	Votes	%	∆%
BN	Hahasrin Hashim	11,409	53.15	▼28.48
PKR	Intan Jawahir	7,985	37.20	▲32.16
PAS	Mohd. Nazari Mokhtar	2,071	9.65	▼3.68
Total valid votes		21,465	98.56	
Total rejected ballots		248	1.14	
Unreturned ballots		66	0.30	
Turnout		21,779	84.93	▼3.87
Registered electors		25,751		
Majority		3,424	15.95	▼52.35
BN hold		Swing		
Source(s) "RESULTS OF CONTESTED ELECTION AND STATEMENTS OF THE POLL AFTER THE OFFICIAL ADDITION OF VOTES".

Johor state election, 2013
Party	Candidate	Votes	%	∆%
BN	Baderi Dasuki	12,274	81.63	▲1.19
PAS	Azlisham Azahar	2,004	13.33	▼3.85
PKR	Mohd. Annuar Mohd. Salleh	758	5.04	▲5.04
Total valid votes		15,036	97.59	
Total rejected ballots		319	2.07	
Unreturned ballots		52	0.34	
Turnout		15,407	88.80	▲8.25
Registered electors		17,358		
Majority		10,270	68.30	▲2.66
BN hold		Swing		
Source(s) "KEPUTUSAN PILIHAN RAYA UMUM DEWAN UNDANGAN NEGERI".

Johor state election, 2008
Party	Candidate	Votes	%	∆%
BN	Baderi Dasuki	9,466	82.82	▼5.48
PAS	Abdul Rashid Abu Bakar	1,963	17.18	▲5.48
Total valid votes		11,429	98.20	
Total rejected ballots		189	1.62	
Unreturned ballots		20	0.17	
Turnout		11,638	80.55	▲1.44
Registered electors		14,448		
Majority		7,503	65.64	▼10.96
BN hold		Swing		
Source(s) "KEPUTUSAN PILIHAN RAYA UMUM DEWAN UNDANGAN NEGERI PERAK BAGI TAHUN 2008".

Johor state election, 2004
Party	Candidate	Votes	%	∆%
BN	Baderi Dasuki	9,395	88.30	▲9.26
PAS	Abdul Rashid Abu Bakar	1,245	11.70	▼9.26
Total valid votes		10,640	98.29	
Total rejected ballots		185	1.71	
Unreturned ballots		0	0.00	
Turnout		10,825	79.11	▲3.77
Registered electors		13,683		
Majority		8,150	76.60	▲18.52
BN hold		Swing		
Source(s) "KEPUTUSAN PILIHAN RAYA UMUM DEWAN UNDANGAN NEGERI PERAK BAGI TAHUN 2004".

Johor state election, 1999
Party	Candidate	Votes	%	∆%
BN	Mohamad Ameran Sohiran	9,024	79.04	▼11.45
PAS	Abdul Aziz Sardan	2,393	20.96	▲20.96
Total valid votes		11,417	91.12	
Total rejected ballots		504	4.02	
Unreturned ballots		608	4.85	
Turnout		12,529	75.34	▲0.65
Registered electors		16,629		
Majority		6,631	58.08	▼22.90
BN hold		Swing		
Source(s) "KEPUTUSAN PILIHAN RAYA UMUM DEWAN UNDANGAN NEGERI PERAK BAGI TAHUN 1999".

Johor state election, 1995
Party	Candidate	Votes	%
BN	Asamon Ismail	9,609	90.49
S46	Zolbahari Abu Bakar	1,010	9.51
Total valid votes		10,619	95.03
Total rejected ballots		465	4.16
Unreturned ballots		90	0.81
Turnout		11,174	74.69
Registered electors		14,961	
Majority		8,599	80.98
This was a new constituency created.
Source(s) "KEPUTUSAN PILIHAN RAYA UMUM DEWAN UNDANGAN NEGERI PERAK BAGI TAHUN 1995".
