= Mohd Idris Jusi =

Malaysian politician

Yang Berbahagia Datuk Mohd Idris Jusi DMSM AMN
- محمد إدريس جوسي

Member of the Malaysian Parliament for Batu Pahat
- In office 5 May 2013 – 9 May 2018
- Preceded by: Mohd Puad Zarkashi (UMNO-BN)
- Succeeded by: Mohd Rashid Hasnon (PKR-PH)
- Majority: 1,732

Personal details
- Born: 1945 Rengit, Batu Pahat, Johor
- Died: 21 July 2022 (aged 76–77)
- Party: Parti Keadilan Rakyat (PKR)
- Other political affiliations: Pakatan Harapan (PH); Pakatan Rakyat (PR)
- Occupation: Politician
- Profession: Teacher
- Website: www.idrisjusi.com

Mohd Idris Jusi is a Malaysian politician from the Parti Keadilan Rakyat (PKR) of Pakatan Harapan (PH) coalition. He was the Member of Parliament for the Batu Pahat constituency in the state of Johor for one term from 2013 to 2018.

== Personal life ==
He was born in Sungai Dulang, Rengit. He received his primary and religious education at Sekolah Kebangsaan Sg Tongkang and his secondary education at Batu Pahat High School.

== Career ==
Before he served as a member of parliament, he was the Assistant Director of National Civics Bureau or Biro Tata Negara (BTN) after worked as a teacher formerly.

== Politics ==
In the 2013 general election, he contested for the Batu Pahat parliamentary seat and defeated former Deputy Minister of Education Mohd Puad Zarkashi with a majority of 1,732 votes. He was dropped as candidate by PKR in the 2018 general election.

== Election results ==
Parliament of Malaysia
Year	Constituency	Candidate	Votes	Pct	Opponent(s)	Votes	Pct	Ballots cast	Majority	Turnout
2013	P150 Batu Pahat	Mohd Idris Jusi (PKR)	38,667	51.01%	Mohd Puad Zarkashi (UMNO)	36,935	48.99%	77,202	1,524	87.46%

== Honours ==
- Malaysia
  - Member of the Order of the Defender of the Realm (AMN) (1994)
- Malacca
  - Companion I of the Exalted Order of Malacca (DMSM) – Datuk (1995)
