= Tenang (state constituency) =

Political subdivision in Malaysia

Tenang (N05)
Johor constituency

State constituency
- Legislature: Johor State Legislative Assembly
MLA
Mohd Azahar Ibrahim
BN
- Constituency created: 1984
- First contested: 1986
- Last contested: 2026

Demographics
- Population (2020): 20,476
- Electors (2026): 22,616
- Area (km²): 306

Tenang is a state constituency in Johor, Malaysia, that is represented in the Johor State Legislative Assembly.

The state constituency was first contested in 1986 and is mandated to return a single Assemblyman to the Johor State Legislative Assembly under the first-past-the-post voting system.

== Demographics ==
As of 2020, Tenang has a population of 20,476 people.

Ethnic breakdown of Tenang's electorate as of 2026
1. Malay (49.7%)
2. Chinese (36.8%)
3. Indian (11.1%)
4. Other ethnicities (2.40%)

== History ==
=== Polling districts ===
According to the gazette issued on 2 July 2026, the Tenang constituency has a total of 12 polling districts.

State constituency	Polling Districts	Code	Location
Tenang (N05)	Kampong Redong	142/05/01	SK Kampung Tenang
Tenang (N05)	Pekan Ayer Panas	142/05/02	SA Ismail Ariffin
Tenang (N05)	Ladang Labis Utara	142/05/03	Dewan Masyarakat Ladang North Labis
Tenang (N05)	Bandar Labis Timor	142/05/04	Dewan Serbaguna Kampung Paya Merah
Tenang (N05)	Bandar Labis Tengah	142/05/05	SMK Kamarul Ariffin
Tenang (N05)	Labis	142/05/06	Dewan Bola Keranjang JKKK Labis; Dewan Yong Hock Kiong
Tenang (N05)	FELDA Tenang	142/05/07	SK LKTP Tenang
Tenang (N05)	Sawah Bahru	142/05/08	SK Sawah Bahru
Tenang (N05)	Tenang Station	142/05/09	SMK Tenang Stesen
Tenang (N05)	Ladang Bukit Dato	142/05/10	SJK (T) Ladang Voules
Tenang (N05)	Chemplak Barat	142/05/11	SA LKTP Chempelak Barat
Tenang (N05)	Chemplak	142/05/12	SK LKTP Chemplak

=== Representation history ===
Members of the Legislative Assembly for Tenang
Assembly	No	Years	Member	Party
Constituency created from Ayer Panas and Bandar Segamat
7th	N07	1986–1990	Bahari Haron	BN (UMNO)
8th	N07	1990–1995	Bahari Haron	BN (UMNO)
9th	N07	1995–1999	Bahari Haron	BN (UMNO)
10th	N07	1999–2004	Ibrahim Daud	BN (UMNO)
11th	N05	2004–2008	Sulaiman Taha	BN (UMNO)
12th	N05	2008–2010	Sulaiman Taha	BN (UMNO)
12th	N05	2010–2013	Mohd Azahar Ibrahim	BN (UMNO)
13th	N05	2013–2018	Mohd Azahar Ibrahim	BN (UMNO)
14th	N05	2018–2020	Mohd Solihan Badri	PH (BERSATU)
14th	N05	2020–2022	Mohd Solihan Badri	PN (BERSATU)
15th	N05	2022–2026	Haslinda Salleh	BN (UMNO)
16th	N05	2026–present	Mohd Azahar Ibrahim	BN (UMNO)

== Election results ==
Johor state election, 2026
Party	Candidate	Votes	%	∆%
BN	Mohd Azhar Ibrahim	8,199	56.23	▲11.31
PH	Elia Nadira Sabudin	4,805	32.96	▲32.96
PN	Normala Sudirman	1,412	9.68	▼13.11
Independent	Siti Aisyah Zobir	164	1.12	▲1.12
Total valid votes		14,580	100.00	
Total rejected ballots		189		
Unreturned ballots		16		
Turnout		14,785	65.37	▲10.91
Registered electors		22,616		
Majority		3,394	23.27	▲8.78
BN hold		Swing		?

Johor state election, 2022
Party	Candidate	Votes	%	∆%
BN	Haslinda Salleh	5,380	44.92	▲1.13
MUDA	Lim Wei Jiet	3,644	30.42	▲30.42
PN	Ahmad Humaizi Udin	2,729	22.79	▼28.13
PEJUANG	Mohd Fauzi Bachok	224	1.87	▲1.87
Total valid votes		11,977	100.00	
Total rejected ballots		281		
Unreturned ballots		59		
Turnout		12,317	54.47	▼28.53
Registered electors		22,613		
Majority		1,736	14.49	▲7.37
BN gain from PKR		Swing		-

Johor state election, 2018
Party	Candidate	Votes	%	∆%
PKR	Mohd Solihan Badri	7,645	50.92	▲50.92
BN	Mohd Azahar Ibrahim	6,575	43.79	▼11.77
PAS	Nasharudin Awang	794	5.29	▼39.15
Total valid votes		15,014	100.00	
Total rejected ballots		227		
Unreturned ballots		29		
Turnout		15,270	83.00	▼3.30
Registered electors		18,398		
Majority		1,070	7.13	▼4.00
PKR gain from BN		Swing		-

Johor state election, 2013
Party	Candidate	Votes	%	∆%
BN	Mohd Azahar Ibrahim	7,921	55.56	▼13.56
PAS	Md Zin Johar	6,335	44.44	▲13.56
Total valid votes		14,256	100.00	
Total rejected ballots		337		
Unreturned ballots		26		
Turnout		14,619	86.30	▲19.30
Registered electors		16,940		
Majority		1,586	11.13	▼27.13
BN hold		Swing		

Johor state by-election, 30 January 2011 Upon the death of the incumbent, Sulaiman Taha
Party	Candidate	Votes	%	∆%
BN	Mohd Azahar Ibrahim	6,699	69.13	▲6.96
PAS	Normala Sudirman	2,992	30.87	▼6.96
Total valid votes		9,691	100.00	
Total rejected ballots		139		
Unreturned ballots		3		
Turnout		9,833	67.00	▼6.52
Registered electors		14,676		
Majority		3,707	38.25	▲13.92
BN hold		Swing		

Johor state election, 2008
Party	Candidate	Votes	%	∆%
BN	Sulaiman Taha	6,367	62.17	▼16.00
PAS	Mohd. Saim Siran	3,875	37.83	▲16.00
Total valid votes		10,242	100.00	
Total rejected ballots		413		
Unreturned ballots		14		
Turnout		10,669	73.52	▲1.54
Registered electors		14,511		
Majority		2,492	24.33	▼32.00
BN hold		Swing		

Johor state election, 2004
Party	Candidate	Votes	%	∆%
BN	Sulaiman Taha	7,655	78.17	▲2.58
PAS	Mohd. Saim bin Siran	2,138	21.83	▼2.58
Total valid votes		9,793	100.00	
Total rejected ballots		379		
Unreturned ballots		11		
Turnout		10,183	71.99	
Registered electors		14,146		
Majority		5,517	56.34	
BN hold		Swing		

Johor state election, 1999
Party	Candidate	Votes	%	∆%
BN	Ibrahim Daud	12,774	75.59	▼8.72
PAS	Mohd Rozali Jamil	4,125	24.41	▲24.41
Total valid votes		16,899	100.00	
Total rejected ballots		661		
Unreturned ballots		39		
Turnout		17,599	74.18	▼0.88
Registered electors		23,726		
Majority		8,649	51.18	▼17.45
BN hold		Swing		

Johor state election, 1995
Party	Candidate	Votes	%	∆%
BN	Bahari Haron	13,668	84.31	▲18.24
PAS	Lahori bin Jemikan	2,543	15.69	▼18.24
Total valid votes		16,211	100.00	
Total rejected ballots		700		
Unreturned ballots		18		
Turnout		16,929	75.05	▼3.54
Registered electors		22,556		
Majority		11,125	68.63	▲36.48
BN hold		Swing		

Johor state election, 1990
Party	Candidate	Votes	%	∆%
BN	Bahari Haron	9,978	66.07	▼18.98
PAS	Asiah Riman	5,124	33.93	▲33.93
Total valid votes		15,102	100.00	
Total rejected ballots		805		
Unreturned ballots		1		
Turnout		15,908	78.60	▲4.78
Registered electors		20,240		
Majority		4,854	32.14	▼37.96
BN hold		Swing		

Johor state election, 1986
Party	Candidate	Votes	%	∆%
BN	Bahari Haron	10,279	85.05	▲85.05
PAS	Mohd. Saim Siran	1,807	14.95	▲11.43
Total valid votes		12,086	100.00	
Total rejected ballots		823		
Unreturned ballots		0		
Turnout		12,909	73.82	▼4.50
Registered electors		17,487		
Majority		8,472	70.10	▲6.20
This was a new constituency created.
