= Mohd Ramli Md Kari =

Malaysian politician

Dr Mohd Ramli Md Kari MBBS (Universiti Malaya)
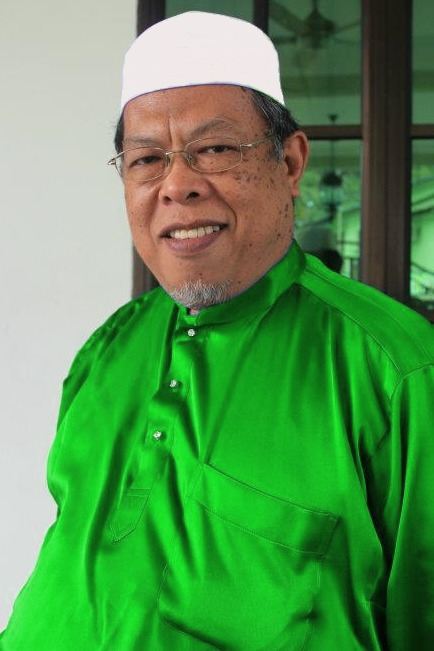

Member of the Johor State Legislative Assembly for Senggarang
- In office 21 March 2004 – 8 March 2008
- Monarch: Sultan Iskandar
- Menteri Besar: Abdul Ghani Othman
- Preceded by: -
- Succeeded by: Ja'affar Hashim
- Constituency: Batu Pahat, Johor

Personal details
- Born: 13 July 1951 (age 75)
- Citizenship: Malaysia
- Party: Malaysian Islamic Party
- Other political affiliations: MN (2019–); PN (2020–)
- Education: Universiti Malaya; Malay College Kuala Kangsar
- Occupation: Member of State Legislative Assembly
- Profession: Politician, Doctor

Mohd Ramli bin Md Kari (born 13 July 1951) is a Malaysian politician who was the member of the Johor State Legislative Assembly for Senggarang from 2004 to 2008. He was the first member of the Malaysian Islamic Party to be elected to the Johor Legislative Assembly.

== Election result ==
Johor State Legislative Assembly
Year	Constituency	Candidate	Votes	Pct.	Opponent(s)	Votes	Pct.	Ballots cast	Majority	Turnout
2004	N24 Senggarang	Mohd Ramli Md Kari (PAS)	Unopposed							
2008	N24 Senggarang	Mohd Ramli Md Kari (PAS)	6,006	58.30%	Ja'afar Hashim (UMNO)	9,034	38.76%	15,495	3,028	78.26%
2013	N24 Senggarang	Mohd Ramli Md Kari (PAS)	9,399	44.40%	Abdul Aziz Ismail (UMNO)	11,254	53.16%	21,171	1,855	88.00%
2018	N24 Senggarang	Mohd Ramli Md Kari (PAS)	2,699	11.49%	Khairuddin Abdul Rahim (AMANAH)	10,568	44.98%	23,493	809	85.16%
2018	N24 Senggarang	Mohd Ramli Md Kari (PAS)	2,699	11.49%	Zaidi Japar (UMNO)	9,759	41.54%	23,493	809	85.16%
