= Onn Abu Bakar =

Malaysian politician

Yang Berhormat Tuan Onn Abu Bakar MP
- عون أبو بكر

Political Secretary of the Office of the President of the People's Justice Party
- President: Anwar Ibrahim
- Senior Political Secretary and Coordinator: Romli Ishak
- Preceded by: Position established

Member of the Malaysian Parliament for Batu Pahat
- Incumbent
- Assumed office 19 November 2022
- Preceded by: Mohd Rashid Hasnon (PH–PKR)
- Majority: 15,972 (2022)

Personal details
- Born: Onn bin Abu Bakar; 1 January 1963 (age 63) Malaysia
- Party: People's Justice Party (PKR)
- Other party: Pakatan Harapan (PH)
- Education: Sekolah Menengah Teknik Kuala Lumpur
- Alma mater: Oita National College
- Occupation: Politician

Onn bin Abu Bakar (born 1 January 1963) is a Malaysian politician who has served as the Political Secretary of the Office of the President of the People's Justice Party (PKR) since April 2024 and Member of Parliament (MP) for Batu Pahat since November 2022. He is a member of PKR, a component party of the Pakatan Harapan (PH) coalition.

== Election results ==
Parliament of Malaysia
Year	Constituency	Candidate	Votes	Pct	Opponent(s)	Votes	Pct	Ballots cast	Majority	Turnout
2013	P153 Sembrong	Onn Abu Bakar (PKR)	12,210	34.83%	Hishammuddin Hussein (UMNO)	22,841	65.17%	35,910	10,631	86.35%
2018	P153 Sembrong	Onn Abu Bakar (PKR)	14,691	40.76%	Hishammuddin Hussein (UMNO)	21,353	59.24%	36,044	6,662	83.02%
2022	P150 Batu Pahat	Onn Abu Bakar (PKR)	45,242	45.47%	Mohd Rashid Hasnon (BERSATU)	29,270	29.42%	100,679	15,972	75.20%
2022	P150 Batu Pahat	Onn Abu Bakar (PKR)	45,242	45.47%	Ishak @ Mohd Farid Siraj (UMNO)	24,309	24.43%	100,679	15,972	75.20%
2022	P150 Batu Pahat	Onn Abu Bakar (PKR)	45,242	45.47%	Nizam Bashir Abdul Kariem Bashier (PEJUANG)	410	0.41%	100,679	15,972	75.20%
2022	P150 Batu Pahat	Onn Abu Bakar (PKR)	45,242	45.47%	Zahari Osman (PRM)	263	0.26%	100,679	15,972	75.20%

Johor State Legislative Assembly
Year	Constituency	Candidate	Votes	Pct	Opponent(s)	Votes	Pct	Ballots cast	Majority	Turnout
2026	N24 Senggarang	Onn Abu Bakar (PKR)			Mohd Rashid Hasnon (BERSATU)					
2026	N24 Senggarang	Onn Abu Bakar (PKR)			Mohd Yusla Ismail (UMNO)					

== Honours ==
=== Honours of Malaysia ===
- Malaysia
  - Recipient of the 17th Yang di-Pertuan Agong Installation Medal (2024)
