= Zaiton Ismail =

Malaysian politician

Yang Berhormat Puan Hajah Zaiton Ismail
- زيتون إسماعيل

Member of the Johor State Executive Council
- 2020–2022: Chairwoman of the Women, Family and Community Development

Member of the Johor State Legislative Assembly for Sungai Balang
- In office 5 May 2013 – 12 March 2022
- Preceded by: Robia Kosai (BN–UMNO)
- Succeeded by: Selamat Takim (BN–UMNO)
- Majority: 1,635 (2013); 174 (2018)

Faction represented in Johor State Legislative Assembly
- 2013–2022: Barisan Nasional

Personal details
- Born: 23 February 1957 (age 69) Muar, Johor, Malaysia
- Citizenship: Malaysian
- Party: United Malays National Organisation (UMNO)
- Other political affiliations: Barisan Nasional (BN); Perikatan Nasional (PN)
- Spouse: Abdul Rahim Ismail
- Children: 1
- Occupation: Politician

Yang Berhormat Puan Hajah Zaiton binti Ismail (born 23 February 1957) is a Malaysian politician who served as Member of the Johor State Executive Council (EXCO) in the Barisan Nasional (BN) state administration under Menteri Besar Hasni Mohammad from March 2020 to March 2022 and Member of the Johor State Legislative Assembly (MLA) for Sungai Balang from May 2013 to March 2022. She is a member and the Division Women's Chief of Muar of the United Malays National Organisation (UMNO), a component party of the ruling BN coalition.

== Election results ==
Johor State Legislative Assembly
Year	Constituency	Candidate	Votes	Pct	Opponent(s)	Votes	Pct	Ballots cast	Majority	Turnout
2013	N16 Sungai Balang	Zaiton Ismail (UMNO)	9,716	54.59%	Malik Mohamed Diah (PAS)	8,081	45.41%	18,205	1,635	86.21%
2018	N16 Sungai Balang	Zaiton Ismail (UMNO)	8,022	42.19%	Na'im Jusri (PKR)	7,848	41.27%	19,470	174	84.90%
2018	N16 Sungai Balang	Zaiton Ismail (UMNO)	8,022	42.19%	Cheman Yusoh (PAS)	3,146	16.54%	19,470	174	84.90%
