= Mohd Rashid Hasnon =

Malaysian politician

Yang Berbahagia Dato' Mohd Rashid Hasnon DMPN
- محمد راشد بن حسنون
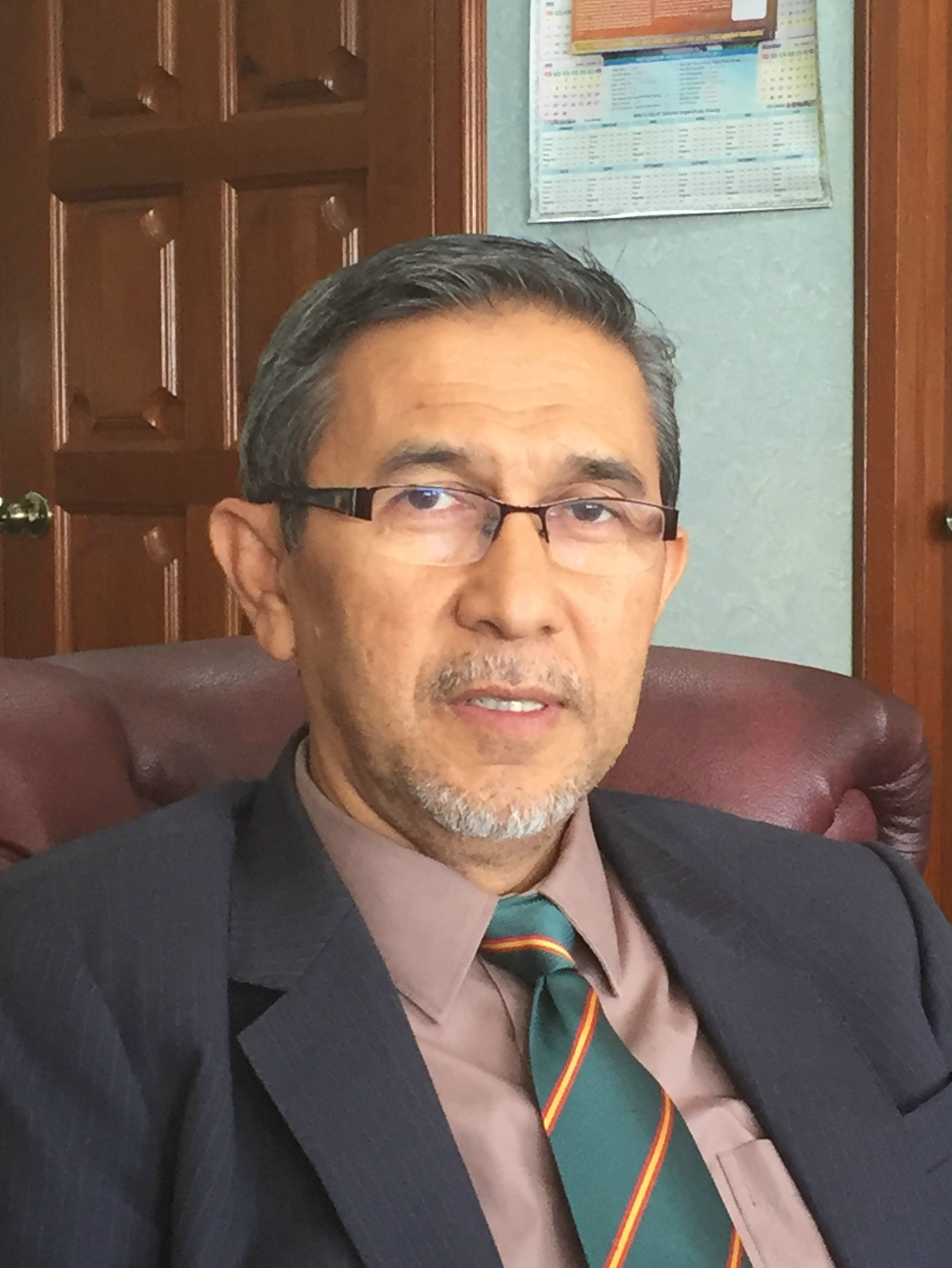

Deputy Speaker of the Dewan Rakyat I
- In office 16 July 2018 – 19 December 2022 Serving with Nga Kor Ming (2018–2020) & Azalina Othman Said (2020–2021)
- Monarchs: Muhammad V (2018–2019); Abdullah (2019–2022)
- Prime Minister: Mahathir Mohamad (2018–2020); Muhyiddin Yassin (2020–2021); Ismail Sabri Yaakob (2021–2022)
- Speaker: Mohamad Ariff Md Yusof (2018–2020); Azhar Azizan Harun (2020–2022)
- Preceded by: Ronald Kiandee
- Succeeded by: Ramli Mohd Nor
- Constituency: Batu Pahat

Deputy Chief Minister of Penang I
- In office 9 May 2013 – 15 May 2018
- Governor: Abdul Rahman Abbas
- Chief Minister: Lim Guan Eng
- Preceded by: Mansor Othman
- Succeeded by: Ahmad Zakiyuddin Abdul Rahman
- Constituency: Pantai Jerejak

Member of the Penang State Executive Council (International Trade, Industrial Development, Entrepreneur and Co-operatives Development and Community Relations)
- In office 9 May 2013 – 15 May 2018
- Governor: Abdul Rahman Abbas
- Chief Minister: Lim Guan Eng
- Preceded by: Lim Guan Eng (International Trade, Industrial Development); Mansor Othman (Entrepreneur and Co-operatives Development, Community Relations)
- Succeeded by: Abdul Halim Hussain (International Trade, Entrepreneur and Co-operatives Development); Ahmad Zakiyuddin Abdul Rahman (Industrial Development, Community Relations)
- Constituency: Pantai Jerejak

Member of the Malaysian Parliament for Batu Pahat
- In office 9 May 2018 – 19 November 2022
- Preceded by: Mohd Idris Jusi (PH–PKR)
- Succeeded by: Onn Abu Bakar (PH–PKR)
- Majority: 17,894 (2018)

Member of the Penang State Legislative Assembly for Pantai Jerejak
- In office 5 May 2013 – 9 May 2018
- Preceded by: Sim Tze Tzin (PH–PKR)
- Succeeded by: Saifuddin Nasution Ismail (PH–PKR)
- Majority: 5,354 (2013)

Faction represented in Dewan Rakyat
- 2018–2020: Pakatan Harapan
- 2020: Malaysian United Indigenous Party
- 2020–2022: Perikatan Nasional

Faction represented in Penang State Legislative Assembly
- 2013–2018: People's Justice Party

Personal details
- Born: Mohd Rashid bin Hasnon; 2 January 1960 (age 66) Muar, Johor, Malaysia
- Citizenship: Malaysian
- Party: People's Justice Party (PKR) (2001–2020); Malaysian United Indigenous Party (BERSATU) (since 2020)
- Other party: Barisan Alternatif (BA) (2001–2004); Pakatan Rakyat (PR) (2008–2015); Pakatan Harapan (PH) (2015–2020); Perikatan Nasional (PN) (since 2020)
- Spouse: Nor Azizah Haron
- Children: 5
- Education: Royal Military College
- Alma mater: University of Sheffield, National University of Malaysia
- Occupation: Politician
- Website: www.rashidhasnon.com

Mohd Rashid bin Hasnon (Jawi: محمد راشد بن حسنون; born 2 January 1960) is a Malaysian politician who served as Deputy Speaker of the Dewan Rakyat I under former Speakers Mohamad Ariff Md Yusof and Azhar Azizan Harun from July 2018 to December 2022, Member of Parliament (MP) for Batu Pahat from May 2018 to November 2022, Deputy Chief Minister of Penang I, Member of the Penang State Executive Council (EXCO) under former Chief Minister Lim Guan Eng and Member of the Penang State Legislative Assembly (MLA) for Pantai Jerejak from May 2013 to May 2018. He is a member of the Malaysian United Indigenous Party (BERSATU), a component party of the Perikatan Nasional (PN) coalition and was a member of People's Justice Party (PKR), a component party of the Pakatan Harapan (PH) coalition.

== Early years, education and career ==
Rashid Hasnon was born in Muar, Johor Bahru to Hasnon and Tek. He was educated in Muar High School and later went to Royal Military College, Sungai Besi. He completed his A-Levels in Southampton Technical College, United Kingdom. He obtained a degree in BSc. Control Engineering at the University of Sheffield, UK. He studied his Master in Business Administration (MBA) at National University of Malaysia. Rashid began his first job at Pernas NEC in 1984. He held the position as the head of planning department in Motorola in 1987. He became the chairman of Personal Managers Group which manages all company that is governed under Free Industrial Zone (FTZ) at Bayan Lepas in 2006. He married Datin Hajjah Nor Azizah bt Haron in 1982 and has 5 children.

== Political career ==
Rashid became the chairman of GERAK Penang in 1999. In 2001, he held the position as PKR State Treasurer. He was one of the founding members of PKR in Penang and has been serving as vice-chairman of Penang State PKR, the opposition party then in Malaysia.

He was elected as Penang State Legislative Assemblyman for Pantai Jerejak in the 2013 election with a bigger majority vote than his predecessor and was appointed as the Deputy Chief Minister 1 of Penang. He was sworn into the position which was assigned to PKR since Pakatan Rakyat took over Penang on 9 May 2013 to succeed Dato' Mansor Othman. Rashid was also the Penang State Executive Council Member in the portfolio of Industrial Development & International Trade, Entrepreneurial Development, Cooperative and Community Relation. He was also the deputy-chairman of Perbadanan Bekalan Air Pulau Pinang (PBAPP) board of directors. He was also the Deputy Chairman of Penang Development Corporation (PDC).

In the May 2018 election, he went back to his home state Johor and contested the parliamentary seat of Batu Pahat. He successfully defeated his opponents from BN and PAS with majority of 17,894.

== International assistance mission ==
Rashid had joined the team of volunteers to Aceh and Meulaboh to help victims of tsunami in 2004. In 2009, he led a mission to help Muslims in Cambodia and Southeast Asian countries. In addition, as the chairman of International JIM national, he did not miss out on a relief mission in Gaza (2011) with a Malaysian non-governmental organization, Islamic Organisations Consultative Council (MAPIM), among the earliest mission to bring aid to Gaza after the Mavi Marmara incident.

== Controversies ==
On 22 January 2019, Rashid had purportedly asked to deliver a speech text by the organisers in the event of the launch of the Enhanced Malaysia International Internet Gateway (EM-IIG) High-Speed Broadband project in Shah Alam which wrongly implicated him and he was mistakenly thought to be representing Deputy Prime Minister Dr Wan Azizah Wan Ismail who could not attend it. The Office of the Deputy Prime Minister said in a statement later that Dr Wan Azizah had never approved the speech text that was delivered and had also not delegated anyone to read out the text of the speech at the event. It also denied that the government would extend its full cooperation to the implementation of the EM-IIG project. Rashid had denied that he represented the Deputy Prime Minister at the event. He demanded the organisers to act immediately to correct the situation and clear his name of any confusion or he would consider legal action against them.

== Election results ==
Penang State Legislative Assembly
Year	Constituency	Candidate	Votes	Pct	Opponent(s)	Votes	Pct	Ballots cast	Majority	Turnout
2013	N36 Pantai Jerejak	Mohd Rashid Hasnon (PKR)	11,805	64.66%	Wong Mun Hoe (Gerakan)	6,451	35.34%	18,464	5,354	85.64%

Johor State Legislative Assembly
Year	Constituency	Candidate	Votes	Pct	Opponent(s)	Votes	Pct	Ballots cast	Majority	Turnout
2026	N24 Senggarang	Mohd Rashid Hasnon (BERSATU)			Onn Abu Bakar (PKR)					
2026	N24 Senggarang	Mohd Rashid Hasnon (BERSATU)			Mohd Yusla Ismail (UMNO)					

Parliament of Malaysia
Year	Constituency	Candidate	Votes	Pct	Opponent(s)	Votes	Pct	Ballots cast	Majority	Turnout
2018	P150 Batu Pahat	Mohd Rashid Hasnon (PKR)	45,929	55.92%	Halizah Abdullah (UMNO)	28,035	34.13%	83,234	17,894	84.81%
2018	P150 Batu Pahat	Mohd Rashid Hasnon (PKR)	45,929	55.92%	Mahfodz Mohamed (PAS)	8,173	9.95%	83,234	17,894	84.81%
2022	P150 Batu Pahat	Mohd Rashid Hasnon (BERSATU)	29,270	29.42%	Onn Abu Bakar (PKR)	45,242	45.47%	99,494	15,972	75.20%
2022	P150 Batu Pahat	Mohd Rashid Hasnon (BERSATU)	29,270	29.42%	Ishak @ Mohd Farid Siraj (UMNO)	24,309	24.43%	99,494	15,972	75.20%
2022	P150 Batu Pahat	Mohd Rashid Hasnon (BERSATU)	29,270	29.42%	Nizam Bashir Abdul Kariem Bashier (PEJUANG)	410	0.41%	99,494	15,972	75.20%
2022	P150 Batu Pahat	Mohd Rashid Hasnon (BERSATU)	29,270	29.42%	Zahari Osman (PRM)	263	0.26%	99,494	15,972	75.20%

== Honours ==
- Penang
  - Companion of the Order of the Defender of State (DMPN) – Dato' (2013)

== See also ==
- Batu Pahat (federal constituency)
- Pantai Jerejak (state constituency)
