= Mohd Yusla Ismail =

Malaysian politician

Yang Berhormat Haji Mohd Yusla Ismail MLA
- محمد يوسلا إسماعيل

Member of the Johor State Legislative Assembly for Senggarang
- Incumbent
- Assumed office 2022
- Preceded by: Khairuddin Abdul Rahim

Personal details
- Born: Mohd Yusla bin Ismail
- Citizenship: Malaysian
- Party: UMNO
- Other political affiliations: Barisan Nasional
- Occupation: Politician

Mohd Yusla bin Ismail is a Malaysian politician from UMNO. He has served as the Member of the Johor State Legislative Assembly for Senggarang since 2022.

== Election results ==
Johor State Legislative Assembly
Year	Constituency	Candidate	Votes	Pct.	Opponent(s)	Votes	Pct.	Ballots cast	Majority	Turnout
2022	N24 Senggarang	Mohd Yusla Ismail (UMNO)	9,725	45.11%	Hamid Jamah (AMANAH)	5,813	26.97%	22,139	3,912	59.24%
2022	N24 Senggarang	Mohd Yusla Ismail (UMNO)	9,725	45.11%	Khairul Faizi Ahmad Kamil (PAS)	5,624	26.09%	22,139	3,912	59.24%
2022	N24 Senggarang	Mohd Yusla Ismail (UMNO)	9,725	45.11%	Baharudin Abdullah (IND)	227	1.05%	22,139	3,912	59.24%
2022	N24 Senggarang	Mohd Yusla Ismail (UMNO)	9,725	45.11%	Zalihah Jaffar (PEJUANG)	168	0.78%	22,139	3,912	59.24%
2026	N24 Senggarang	Mohd Yusla Ismail (UMNO)	16,797	60.56%	Mohd Rashid Hasnon (BERSATU)	2,058	7.42%	28,172	7,916	28.54%
2026	N24 Senggarang	Mohd Yusla Ismail (UMNO)	16,797	60.56%	Onn Abu Bakar (PKR)	8,881	32.02%	28,172	7,916	28.54%
