= Mohd Puad Zarkashi =

Malaysian politician

Yang Berbahagia Datuk Dr. Mohd Puad Zarkashi PJN DSAP PIS II
- محمد ڤؤاد زرکشي

Speaker of the Johor State Legislative Assembly
- In office 21 April 2022 – 27 August 2026
- Monarch: Ibrahim Iskandar
- Menteri Besar: Onn Hafiz Ghazi
- Deputy: Samsolbari Jamali
- Preceded by: Suhaizan Kayat
- Succeeded by: Zahari Sarip
- Constituency: Rengit

Deputy Minister of Education II
- In office 10 April 2009 – 15 May 2013 Serving with Wee Ka Siong (Deputy Minister of Education I)
- Monarchs: Mizan Zainal Abidin (2009–2011); Abdul Halim (2011–2013)
- Prime Minister: Najib Razak
- Minister: Muhyiddin Yassin
- Preceded by: Razali Ismail
- Succeeded by: Mary Yap Kain Ching
- Constituency: Batu Pahat

Member of the Johor State Legislative Assembly for Rengit
- In office 12 March 2022 – 11 July 2026
- Preceded by: Ayub Jamil (BN–UMNO)
- Succeeded by: Zaidi Japar (BN–UMNO)
- Majority: 1,920 (2022)

Member of the Malaysian Parliament for Batu Pahat
- In office 8 March 2008 – 5 May 2013
- Preceded by: Junaidy Abdul Wahab (BN–UMNO)
- Succeeded by: Mohd Idris Jusi (PR–PKR)
- Majority: 12,968 (2008)

Senator (Elected by the Johor State Legislative Assembly)
- In office 13 October 2004 – 12 October 2007 Serving with Tay Puay Chuan
- Monarchs: Sirajuddin (2004–2006); Mizan Zainal Abidin (2006–2007)
- Prime Minister: Abdullah Ahmad Badawi
- Preceded by: Haris Salleh
- Succeeded by: Ahamad Yusop

Personal details
- Born: Mohd Puad bin Zarkashi; 7 July 1957 (age 69) Johor, Federation of Malaya (now Malaysia)
- Citizenship: Malaysian
- Party: Malaysian Islamic Party (PAS) (until 1980); United Malays National Organisation (UMNO) (1980–2026)
- Other political affiliations: Barisan Nasional (BN) (1980–2026)
- Spouse: Rubiah Leman
- Education: University of Hull (PhD)
- Occupation: Politician
- Website: puadzarkashii.blogspot.com

Mohd Puad Zarkashi (Jawi: فؤاد زرکشي) (born 7 July 1957) is a Malaysian politician who is the former Speaker of the Johor State Legislative Assembly from April 2022 to July 2026. He also was a member of the Johor State Legislative Assembly (MLA) for Rengit from March 2022 to July 2026. He previously served as Deputy Minister of Education in the Barisan Nasional (BN) administration under former Prime Minister Najib Razak and former Minister Muhyiddin Yassin from April 2009 to May 2013, Member of Parliament (MP) for Batu Pahat from March 2008 to May 2013, Senator from October 2004 to October 2007 and Director-General of Special Affairs Department (JASA) from March 2015 to his resignation in April 2018. He was a member of the United Malays National Organisation (UMNO), a component party of the ruling BN coalition and also was a Member of the Supreme Council of UMNO before his resignation from UMNO in 2026. He was generally regarded as a vocal supporter of Deputy Prime Minister Ahmad Zahid Hamidi and former Prime Minister Najib Razak as well as a critic of Perikatan Nasional (PN) and its Chairman Muhyiddin Yassin.

== Early life and education ==
Puad is of Banjar descent. He holds a Doctor of Philosophy conferred by the University of Hull.

== Political career ==
Puad was elected at the 2008 election for the seat previously held by UMNO's Junaidy Abdul Wahab. He had previously served as a Senator. Puad only served one term in the Dewan Rakyat, after being defeated in the 2013 election by Mohd Idris Jusi of the opposition People's Justice Party (PKR). Despite his defeat, he was re-elected to UMNO's 25-member Supreme Council later in the year. Puad was dropped as candidate by UMNO in the 2018 general election.

In April 2008, Puad called for the resignation of then Prime Minister Abdullah Ahmad Badawi after UMNO's performance in the 2008 election.

When Najib Razak replaced Abdullah as Prime Minister in April 2009, Puad was appointed a Deputy Education Minister.

Puad was appointed JASA director-general in March 2015 but he quit on 25 April 2018 in protest for not being picked as a BN candidate for the 2018 general election. JASA was somehow disbanded months later by the new Pakatan Harapan (PH) government after the downfall of the BN in the 2018 election.

== Controversies ==
In September 2012, Puad stated his belief that homosexuals could be identified through various means including the use of "V-Neck and sleeveless clothing" as well as a person's personal preference for "tight and light-colored clothing". He stated that these characteristics were "symptoms" which would allow parents to spot whether or not their son may be a homosexual, supporting the need to discipline them into turning straight "like it's a disease which can be cured" – a stance that is also endorsed by Malaysia's Ministry of Education because they believe that this could actually affect one's ability to learn.

== Election results ==
Parliament of Malaysia
Year	Constituency	Candidate	Votes	Pct	Opponent(s)	Votes	Pct	Ballots cast	Majority	Turnout
2008	P150 Batu Pahat	Mohd Puad Zarkashi (UMNO)	32,461	62.42%	Muhamad Abdullah (PAS)	19,757	37.58%	54,103	12,968	77.21%
2013	P150 Batu Pahat	Mohd Puad Zarkashi (UMNO)	36,935	48.99%	Mohd Idris Jusi (PKR)	38,667	51.01%	77,202	1,524	87.46%

Johor State Legislative Assembly
Year	Constituency	Candidate	Votes	Pct	Opponent(s)	Votes	Pct	Ballots cast	Majority	Turnout
2022	N25 Rengit	Mohd Puad Zarkashi (UMNO)	7,903	48.91%	Mohammad Huzair Lajis (BERSATU)	5,983	37.03%	16,157	1,920	59.57%
2022	N25 Rengit	Mohd Puad Zarkashi (UMNO)	7,903	48.91%	Khairuddin Abdul Rahim (PKR)	2,065	12.78%	16,157	1,920	59.57%
2022	N25 Rengit	Mohd Puad Zarkashi (UMNO)	7,903	48.91%	Nizam Bashir Abdul Kariem Bashir (PEJUANG)	206	1.27%	16,157	1,920	59.57%

== Honours ==
- Malaysia
  - Commander of the Order of Meritorious Service (PJN) – Datuk (2014)
- Johor
  - Second Class of the Sultan Ibrahim Medal (PIS II) (2000)
- Pahang
  - Knight Companion of the Order of Sultan Ahmad Shah of Pahang (DSAP) – Dato' (2009)
