= Senggarang (state constituency) =

State constituency in Johor, Malaysia

Senggarang (N24)
Johor constituency

State constituency
- Legislature: Johor State Legislative Assembly
MLA
Mohd Yusla Ismail
BN
- Constituency created: 2003
- First contested: 2004
- Last contested: 2026

Demographics
- Population (2020): 47,266
- Electors (2026): 38,576
- Area (km²): 217

Senggarang is a state constituency in Johor, Malaysia, that is represented in the Johor State Legislative Assembly.

The state constituency was first contested in 2004 and is mandated to return a single Assemblyman to the Johor State Legislative Assembly under the first-past-the-post voting system.

== Demographics ==
As of 2020, Senggarang has a population of 47,266 people.

Ethnic breakdown of Senggarang's electorate as of 2026
1. Malay (61.8%)
2. Chinese (35.0%)
3. Other ethnicities (2.70%)
4. Indian (0.70%)

== History ==
=== Polling districts ===
According to the gazette issued on 2 July 2026, the Senggarang constituency has a total of 15 polling districts.

State constituency	Polling District	Code	Location
Senggarang (N24)	Minyak Beku	150/24/01	SK Minyak Beku
Senggarang (N24)	Petani Kechik	150/24/02	SJK (C) Ping Ming
Senggarang (N24)	Banang	150/24/03	SK Banang Jaya
Senggarang (N24)	Sungai Ayam	150/24/04	SK Seri Banang
Senggarang (N24)	Sungai Suloh	150/24/05	SK Sg. Suloh
Senggarang (N24)	Koris	150/24/06	SK Koris
Senggarang (N24)	Parit Tariman	150/24/07	SK Seri Molek
Senggarang (N24)	Parit Kadir	150/24/08	SK Parit Kadir
Senggarang (N24)	Parit Kemang	150/24/09	SK Parit Kemang
Senggarang (N24)	Sungai Lurus	150/25/10	SK Senggarang
Senggarang (N24)	Bandar Senggarang Barat	150/24/11	SMK Senggarang
Senggarang (N24)	Bandar Senggarang Timor	150/24/12	SJK (C) Chong Hwa Senggarang
Senggarang (N24)	Senggarang	150/24/13	SA Senggarang
Senggarang (N24)	Kampong Bahru	150/24/14	SK Kg Bahru
Senggarang (N24)	Taman Senggarang	150/24/15	SA Koris

=== Representation history ===
Members of the Legislative Assembly for Senggarang
Assembly	No	Years	Member	Party
Constituency created from Rengit, Parit Raja and Penggeram
11th	N24	2004–2008	Mohd Ramli Md Kari	PAS
12th	N24	2008–2013	Jaafar Hashim	BN (UMNO)
13th	N24	2013–2018	A. Aziz Ismail	BN (UMNO)
14th	N24	2018–2021	Khairuddin Abdul Rahim	PH (AMANAH)
14th	N24	2021–2022	Khairuddin Abdul Rahim	PH (PKR)
15th	N24	2022–2026	Mohd Yusla Ismail	BN (UMNO)
16th	N24	2026–present	Mohd Yusla Ismail	BN (UMNO)

== Election results ==
Johor state election, 2026
Party	Candidate	Votes	%	∆%
BN	Mohd Yusla Ismail	16,797	60.56	▲15.45
PH	Onn Abu Bakar	8,881	32.02	▲5.05
PN	Mohd Rashid Hasnon	2,058	7.42	▼18.67
Total valid votes		27,736	100.00	
Total rejected ballots		405		
Unreturned ballots		31		
Turnout		28,172	73.03	▲13.79
Registered electors		38,576		
Majority		7,916	28.54	▲10.39
BN hold		Swing		

Johor state election, 2022
Party	Candidate	Votes	%	∆%
BN	Mohd Yusla Ismail	9,725	45.11	▲3.77
PH	Hamid Jamah	5,813	26.97	▲26.97
PN	Khairul Faizi Ahmad Kamil	5,624	26.09	▲26.09
Independent	Baharudin Abdullah	227	1.05	▲1.05
PEJUANG	Zalihah Jaffar	168	0.78	▲0.78
Total valid votes		21,557	97.37	
Total rejected ballots		424	1.92	
Unreturned ballots		158	0.71	
Turnout		22,139	59.24	▼25.92
Registered electors		37,374		
Majority		3,912	18.14	▲14.71
BN gain from PKR		Swing		+10.56

Johor state election, 2018
Party	Candidate	Votes	%	∆%
PKR	Khairuddin Abdul Rahim	10,568	44.77	▲44.77
BN	Zaidi Japar	9,759	41.34	▼27.21
PAS	Mohd Ramli Md Kari	2,699	11.43	▼20.02
Total valid votes		23,606	98.01	
Total rejected ballots		394	1.68	
Unreturned ballots		73	0.31	
Turnout		23,493	85.16	▼2.84
Registered electors		27,587		
Majority		809	3.43	▼33.67
PKR gain from BN		Swing		?
Source(s) "RESULTS OF CONTESTED ELECTION AND STATEMENTS OF THE POLL AFTER THE OFFICIAL ADDITION OF VOTES".

Johor state election, 2013
Party	Candidate	Votes	%	∆%
BN	Abdul Aziz Ismail	11,254	68.55	▲8.48
PAS	Mohd Ramli Md Kari	9,399	31.45	▼8.48
Total valid votes		16,418	97.55	
Total rejected ballots		469	2.22	
Unreturned ballots		49	0.23	
Turnout		21,171	88.00	▲9.74
Registered electors		24,048		
Majority		1,855	37.10	▲16.96
BN hold		Swing		
Source(s) "KEPUTUSAN PILIHAN RAYA UMUM DEWAN UNDANGAN NEGERI".

Johor state election, 2008
Party	Candidate	Votes	%	∆%
BN	Ja'afar Hashim	9,034	60.07	▲60.07
PAS	Mohd Ramli Md Kari	6,006	39.93	▲39.93
Total valid votes		15,040	97.06	
Total rejected ballots		428	2.76	
Unreturned ballots		27	0.17	
Turnout		15,495	78.26	
Registered electors		19,799		
Majority		3,028	20.14	
BN gain from PAS		Swing		?
Source(s) "KEPUTUSAN PILIHAN RAYA UMUM DEWAN UNDANGAN NEGERI PERAK BAGI TAHUN 2008".

Johor state election, 2004
Party	Candidate	Votes	%
On the nomination day, Mohd Ramli Md Kari won uncontested.
PAS	Mohd Ramli Md Kari		
Total valid votes			
Total rejected ballots			
Unreturned ballots			
Turnout			
Registered electors		19,820	
Majority			
This was a new constituency created.
Source(s) "KEPUTUSAN PILIHAN RAYA UMUM DEWAN UNDANGAN NEGERI PERAK BAGI TAHUN 2004".
