= Hahasrin Hashim =

Malaysian politician

- هاهسرين هاشم

Member of the Johor State Legislative Assembly for Panti
- In office 9 May 2018 – 11 July 2026
- Preceded by: Baderi Dasuki (BN–UMNO)
- Succeeded by: Muhammad Naqib Md Ghazali (BN–UMNO)
- Majority: 3,424 (2018); 5,854 (2022)

Personal details
- Born: Hahasrin bin Hashim; 13 April 1976 (age 50) Tenggara, Johor
- Citizenship: Malaysian
- Party: UMNO
- Other political affiliations: Barisan Nasional (BN)
- Spouse(s): Janatul Islah Mohammad (died 2018)
- Education: University of York
- Occupation: Politician

Hahasrin bin Hashim is a Malaysian politician who has served as Member of the Johor State Legislative Assembly (MLA) for Panti since 2018. He is a member and the Vice Division Chief of Tenggara of the United Malays National Organisation (UMNO), a component party of the Barisan Nasional (BN) coalition.

== Education ==
He is a Bachelor of Electronics Engineering from University of York.

== Politics ==
He was the UMNO Youth Chief of Johor and UMNO Tenggara branch. He is currently the Vice Chief of UMNO Tenggara, serving under the leadership of Division Chief Dr. Adham Baba (former Federal Minister and Tenggara MP) and Deputy Division Chief Manndzri Nasib (incumbent Tenggara MP).

== Election results ==
Johor State Legislative Assembly
Year	Constituency	Candidate	Votes	Pct.	Opponent(s)	Votes	Pct.	Ballots cast	Majority	Turnout
2018	N34 Panti	Hahasrin Hashim (UMNO)	11,409	52.39%	Intan Jawahir (BERSATU)	7,985	36.66%	21,779	3,424	84.93%
2018	N34 Panti	Hahasrin Hashim (UMNO)	11,409	52.39%	Mohd. Nazari Mokhtar (PAS)	2,071	9.51%	21,779	3,424	84.93%
2022	N34 Panti	Hahasrin Hashim (UMNO)	12,599	56.16%	Hassan Rasid (BERSATU)	6,745	30.06%	22,435	5,854	58.41%
2022	N34 Panti	Hahasrin Hashim (UMNO)	12,599	56.16%	Ahmad Daniel (AMANAH)	2,314	10.31%	22,435	5,854	58.41%
2022	N34 Panti	Hahasrin Hashim (UMNO)	12,599	56.16%	Ahmade Mohd Din (PEJUANG)	334	1.49%	22,435	5,854	58.41%

== Personal life ==
He was married to Janatul Islah Mohammad and has 4 children. His wife died on 18 December 2018 in Subang Jaya Medical Centre.
