= Haslinda Salleh =

Malaysian politician

- هاسليندا سالله

Member of the Johor State Legislative Assembly for Tenang
- In office 12 March 2022 – 11 July 2026
- Preceded by: Mohd Solihan Badri
- Succeeded by: Mohd Azahar Ibrahim

Personal details
- Born: Haslinda binti Salleh
- Citizenship: Malaysian
- Party: UMNO
- Other political affiliations: Barisan Nasional
- Occupation: Politician

Haslinda binti Salleh is a Malaysian politician from UMNO. She has served as the Member of the Johor State Legislative Assembly for Tenang since 2022.

== Election results ==
Johor State Legislative Assembly
Year	Constituency	Candidate	Votes	Pct.	Opponent(s)	Votes	Pct.	Ballots cast	Majority	Turnout
2022	N05 Tenang	Haslinda Salleh (UMNO)	5,380	44.91%	Lim Wei Jiet (MUDA)	3,644	30.42%	12,317	1,736	54.47%
2022	N05 Tenang	Haslinda Salleh (UMNO)	5,380	44.91%	Ahmad Humaizi Udin (BERSATU)	2,729	22.79%	12,317	1,736	54.47%
2022	N05 Tenang	Haslinda Salleh (UMNO)	5,380	44.91%	Mohd Fauzi Bachok (PEJUANG)	224	1.87%	12,317	1,736	54.47%
