= Selamat Takim =

Malaysian politician

Yang Berhormat Haji Selamat Takim MLA
- سلامت تاکيم

Member of the Johor State Legislative Assembly for Sungai Balang
- Incumbent
- Assumed office 2022
- Preceded by: Zaiton Ismail

Personal details
- Born: Selamat bin Takim; 1965 (age 60–61)
- Citizenship: Malaysian
- Party: UMNO
- Other political affiliations: Barisan Nasional
- Occupation: Politician

Selamat bin Takim is a Malaysian politician from UMNO. He has served as the Member of the Johor State Legislative Assembly for Sungai Balang since 2022.

== Election results ==
Johor State Legislative Assembly
Year	Constituency	Candidate	Votes	Pct.	Opponent(s)	Votes	Pct.	Ballots cast	Majority	Turnout
2022	N16 Sungai Balang	Selamat Takim (UMNO)	8,294	45.57%	Zainuddin Sayuti (BERSATU)	6,001	32.97%	18,624	2,293	61.83%
2022	N16 Sungai Balang	Selamat Takim (UMNO)	8,294	45.57%	Abdullah Sahid (PKR)	3,576	19.65%	18,624	2,293	61.83%
2022	N16 Sungai Balang	Selamat Takim (UMNO)	8,294	45.57%	Intan Nadira Shafika (PEJUANG)	329	1.81%	18,624	2,293	61.83%
2026	N16 Sungai Balang	Selamat Takim (UMNO)	13,908	60.81%	Ayna Soraya Badaruddin (PKR)	3,980	17.40%	23,082	8,926	74.36%
2026	N16 Sungai Balang	Selamat Takim (UMNO)	13,908	60.81%	Muhammad Amin Sailan (PAS)	4,982	21.78%	23,082	8,926	74.36%
