= Results of the 2022 Johor state election =

Malaysian election results

These are the results of the 2022 Johor state election. The elections was held in Johor on 12 March 2022.

== Map ==
Map of constituencies

== Full result ==
#	Constituency	Registered Electors	Winner	Votes	Votes %	Majority	Opponent(s)	Votes	Votes %	Total valid votes	Incumbent
BN 40 | PH 11 | PN 3 | PKR 1 | MUDA 1 | PEJUANG 0 | WARISAN 0 | PBM 0 | PSM 0 | PUTRA 0 | Independent 0
N01	Buloh Kasap	28,481	Zahari Sarip (BN–UMNO)	8,956	56.96%	5,377	Subramani Chami (PH–PKR)	3,579	22.76%	15,724	Zahari Sarip (BN–UMNO)
N01	Buloh Kasap	28,481	Zahari Sarip (BN–UMNO)	8,956	56.96%	5,377	Norazman Md. Diah (PN–BERSATU)	2,999	19.07%	15,724	Zahari Sarip (BN–UMNO)
N01	Buloh Kasap	28,481	Zahari Sarip (BN–UMNO)	8,956	56.96%	5,377	Mohd Hanafi Ahmad (PEJUANG)	190	1.21%	15,724	Zahari Sarip (BN–UMNO)
N02	Jementah	41,221	Ng Kor Sim (PH–DAP)	8,877	40.92%	714	See Ann Giap (BN–MCA)	8,163	37.63%	21,694	Tan Chen Choon (PH–DAP)
N02	Jementah	41,221	Ng Kor Sim (PH–DAP)	8,877	40.92%	714	Maimunah Safwah Musa (PN–PAS)	4,654	21.45%	21,694	Tan Chen Choon (PH–DAP)
N03	Pemanis	29,923	Anuar Abdul Manap (BN–UMNO)	8,638	50.33%	4,187	Yoong Thau (PH–PKR)	4,491	26.05%	17,241	Chong Fat Full (PN–BERSATU)
N03	Pemanis	29,923	Anuar Abdul Manap (BN–UMNO)	8,638	50.33%	4,187	Uzzair Ismail (PN–BERSATU)	3,825	22.19%	17,241	Chong Fat Full (PN–BERSATU)
N03	Pemanis	29,923	Anuar Abdul Manap (BN–UMNO)	8,638	50.33%	4,187	Azita Amrin (PEJUANG)	247	1.43%	17,241	Chong Fat Full (PN–BERSATU)
N04	Kemelah	33,702	Saraswathy Nallathanby (BN–MIC)	7,518	41.13%	1,611	Sulaiman Mohd Nor (PH–AMANAH)	5,907	32.32%	18,278	Sulaiman Mohd Nor (PH–AMANAH)
N04	Kemelah	33,702	Saraswathy Nallathanby (BN–MIC)	7,518	41.13%	1,611	Normala Sudirman (PN–PAS)	4,639	25.38%	18,278	Sulaiman Mohd Nor (PH–AMANAH)
N04	Kemelah	33,702	Saraswathy Nallathanby (BN–MIC)	7,518	41.13%	1,611	Norizan Sahardin (PEJUANG)	214	1.17%	18,278	Sulaiman Mohd Nor (PH–AMANAH)
N05	Tenang	22,613	Haslinda Salleh (BN–UMNO)	5,380	44.92%	1,736	Lim Wei Jiet (MUDA)	3,644	30.42%	11,977	Mohd Solihan Badri (PN–BERSATU)
N05	Tenang	22,613	Haslinda Salleh (BN–UMNO)	5,380	44.92%	1,736	Ahmad Humaizi Uzir (PN–BERSATU)	2,729	22.79%	11,977	Mohd Solihan Badri (PN–BERSATU)
N05	Tenang	22,613	Haslinda Salleh (BN–UMNO)	5,380	44.92%	1,736	Mohd Fauzi Bachok (PEJUANG)	224	1.87%	11,977	Mohd Solihan Badri (PN–BERSATU)
N06	Bekok	27,426	Tan Chong (BN–MCA)	7,036	51.30%	3,569	Kanan Muruppiah (PH–DAP)	3,467	25.28%	13,714	Ramakrishnan Suppiah (PH–DAP)
N06	Bekok	27,426	Tan Chong (BN–MCA)	7,036	51.30%	3,569	Tan Lek Khang (PN–BERSATU)	2,881	21.01%	13,714	Ramakrishnan Suppiah (PH–DAP)
N06	Bekok	27,426	Tan Chong (BN–MCA)	7,036	51.30%	3,569	Sandara Segaran Arumugam (WARISAN)	330	2.41%	13,714	Ramakrishnan Suppiah (PH–DAP)
N07	Bukit Kepong	37,495	Sahruddin Jamal (PN–BERSATU)	9,873	44.27%	710	Ismail Mohamed (BN–UMNO)	9,163	41.08%	22,303	Sahruddin Jamal (PN–BERSATU)
N07	Bukit Kepong	37,495	Sahruddin Jamal (PN–BERSATU)	9,873	44.27%	710	Afiqah Zulkifli (MUDA)	3,076	13.79%	22,303	Sahruddin Jamal (PN–BERSATU)
N07	Bukit Kepong	37,495	Sahruddin Jamal (PN–BERSATU)	9,873	44.27%	710	Md. Taib Md. Suhut (PEJUANG)	191	0.86%	22,303	Sahruddin Jamal (PN–BERSATU)
N08	Bukit Pasir	32,213	Mohamad Fazli Mohamad Salleh (BN–UMNO)	6,048	32.11%	198	Muhd Nur Iqbal Abd Razak (PN–PAS)	5,850	31.06%	18,837	Najib Lep (PN–PAS)
N08	Bukit Pasir	32,213	Mohamad Fazli Mohamad Salleh (BN–UMNO)	6,048	32.11%	198	Elia Nadira Sabudin (PH–AMANAH)	4,676	24.82%	18,837	Najib Lep (PN–PAS)
N08	Bukit Pasir	32,213	Mohamad Fazli Mohamad Salleh (BN–UMNO)	6,048	32.11%	198	Najib Lep (IND)	1,860	9.87%	18,837	Najib Lep (PN–PAS)
N08	Bukit Pasir	32,213	Mohamad Fazli Mohamad Salleh (BN–UMNO)	6,048	32.11%	198	Johar Siraj (IND)	207	1.10%	18,837	Najib Lep (PN–PAS)
N08	Bukit Pasir	32,213	Mohamad Fazli Mohamad Salleh (BN–UMNO)	6,048	32.11%	198	Mohd Akhiri Mahmood (PEJUANG)	196	1.04%	18,837	Najib Lep (PN–PAS)
N09	Gambir	29,434	Sahrihan Jani (BN–UMNO)	7,960	45.48%	3,146	Mohd Solihan Badri (PN–BERSATU)	4,814	27.50%	17,503	Muhyiddin Yassin (PN–BERSATU)
N09	Gambir	29,434	Sahrihan Jani (BN–UMNO)	7,960	45.48%	3,146	Naim Jusri (PH–PKR)	4,509	25.76%	17,503	Muhyiddin Yassin (PN–BERSATU)
N09	Gambir	29,434	Sahrihan Jani (BN–UMNO)	7,960	45.48%	3,146	Suraya Sulaiman (PEJUANG)	220	1.26%	17,503	Muhyiddin Yassin (PN–BERSATU)
N10	Tangkak	35,554	Ee Chin Li (PH–DAP)	8,105	40.85%	372	Ong Chee Siang (BN–MCA)	7,733	38.98%	19,840	Ee Chin Li (PH–DAP)
N10	Tangkak	35,554	Ee Chin Li (PH–DAP)	8,105	40.85%	372	Chong Fat Full (PN–BERSATU)	3,092	15.58%	19,840	Ee Chin Li (PH–DAP)
N10	Tangkak	35,554	Ee Chin Li (PH–DAP)	8,105	40.85%	372	Zainal Bahrom A. Kadir (IND)	789	3.98%	19,840	Ee Chin Li (PH–DAP)
N10	Tangkak	35,554	Ee Chin Li (PH–DAP)	8,105	40.85%	372	Muhammad Ariel Zabridin (PEJUANG)	121	0.61%	19,840	Ee Chin Li (PH–DAP)
N11	Serom	39,018	Khairin Nisa Ismail (BN–UMNO)	8,507	38.40%	699	Rahmat Daud (PN–PAS)	7,808	35.24%	22,156	Faizul Amri Adnan (PH–PKR)
N11	Serom	39,018	Khairin Nisa Ismail (BN–UMNO)	8,507	38.40%	699	Abdullah Ainullotfi (PH–AMANAH)	5,509	24.86%	22,156	Faizul Amri Adnan (PH–PKR)
N11	Serom	39,018	Khairin Nisa Ismail (BN–UMNO)	8,507	38.40%	699	Abdul Azim Abdul Malek (PEJUANG)	332	1.50%	22,156	Faizul Amri Adnan (PH–PKR)
N12	Bentayan	34,728	Ng Yak Howe (PH–DAP)	10,973	64.53%	7,476	Gan Q'i Ru (BN–MCA)	3,497	20.57%	17,004	Ng Yak Howe (PH–DAP)
N12	Bentayan	34,728	Ng Yak Howe (PH–DAP)	10,973	64.53%	7,476	Eddy Tan Kok Hong (PN–GERAKAN)	2,534	14.90%	17,004	Ng Yak Howe (PH–DAP)
N13	Simpang Jeram	40,014	Salahuddin Ayub (PH–AMANAH)	8,749	40.94%	2,399	Zarul Salleh (PN–PAS)	6,350	29.72%	21,369	Salahuddin Ayub (PH–AMANAH)
N13	Simpang Jeram	40,014	Salahuddin Ayub (PH–AMANAH)	8,749	40.94%	2,399	Lokman Md Don (BN–UMNO)	6,062	28.37%	21,369	Salahuddin Ayub (PH–AMANAH)
N13	Simpang Jeram	40,014	Salahuddin Ayub (PH–AMANAH)	8,749	40.94%	2,399	Mahaizal Mahmor (PEJUANG)	208	0.97%	21,369	Salahuddin Ayub (PH–AMANAH)
N14	Bukit Naning	22,594	Fuad Tukirin (BN–UMNO)	5,437	38.14%	1,535	Mahadzir Abu Said (PN–BERSATU)	3,902	27.37%	14,256	Md Ysahruddin Kusni (PH–PKR)
N14	Bukit Naning	22,594	Fuad Tukirin (BN–UMNO)	5,437	38.14%	1,535	Md Ysahruddin Kusni (PH–PKR)	3,317	23.27%	14,256	Md Ysahruddin Kusni (PH–PKR)
N14	Bukit Naning	22,594	Fuad Tukirin (BN–UMNO)	5,437	38.14%	1,535	Jeganathan Subramaniam (IND)	1,514	10.62%	14,256	Md Ysahruddin Kusni (PH–PKR)
N14	Bukit Naning	22,594	Fuad Tukirin (BN–UMNO)	5,437	38.14%	1,535	Ibrahim Shafe'e (PEJUANG)	86	0.60%	14,256	Md Ysahruddin Kusni (PH–PKR)
N15	Maharani	38,596	Abdul Aziz Talib (PN–PAS)	7,559	35.97%	1,037	Nor Hayati Bachok (PH–AMANAH)	6,522	31.03%	21,016	Nor Hayati Bachok (PH–AMANAH)
N15	Maharani	38,596	Abdul Aziz Talib (PN–PAS)	7,559	35.97%	1,037	Noor Farah Shamsudin (BN–UMNO)	5,861	27.89%	21,016	Nor Hayati Bachok (PH–AMANAH)
N15	Maharani	38,596	Abdul Aziz Talib (PN–PAS)	7,559	35.97%	1,037	Lim Kim Joo (IND)	592	2.82%	21,016	Nor Hayati Bachok (PH–AMANAH)
N15	Maharani	38,596	Abdul Aziz Talib (PN–PAS)	7,559	35.97%	1,037	Riad Ahmad (PEJUANG)	292	1.39%	21,016	Nor Hayati Bachok (PH–AMANAH)
N15	Maharani	38,596	Abdul Aziz Talib (PN–PAS)	7,559	35.97%	1,037	Muhammad Hasni Asmui Md Salleh (PBM)	190	0.90%	21,016	Nor Hayati Bachok (PH–AMANAH)
N16	Sungai Balang	30,121	Selamat Takim (BN–UMNO)	8,294	45.57%	2,293	Zainudin Sayuti (PN–BERSATU)	6,001	32.97%	18,200	Zaiton Ismail (BN–UMNO)
N16	Sungai Balang	30,121	Selamat Takim (BN–UMNO)	8,294	45.57%	2,293	Abdullah Sahid (PH–PKR)	3,576	19.65%	18,200	Zaiton Ismail (BN–UMNO)
N16	Sungai Balang	30,121	Selamat Takim (BN–UMNO)	8,294	45.57%	2,293	Intan Nadira Mustafa Kamal (PEJUANG)	329	1.81%	18,200	Zaiton Ismail (BN–UMNO)
N17	Semerah	46,640	Mohd Fared Mohd Khalid (BN–UMNO)	12,542	44.94%	4,041	Ariss Samsudin (PN–BERSATU)	8,501	30.45%	27,916	Mohd Khuzzan Abu Bakar (PH–PKR)
N17	Semerah	46,640	Mohd Fared Mohd Khalid (BN–UMNO)	12,542	44.94%	4,041	Mohd Khuzzan Abu Bakar (PH–PKR)	6,265	22.44%	27,916	Mohd Khuzzan Abu Bakar (PH–PKR)
N17	Semerah	46,640	Mohd Fared Mohd Khalid (BN–UMNO)	12,542	44.94%	4,041	Mahdzir Ibrahim (PEJUANG)	361	1.29%	27,916	Mohd Khuzzan Abu Bakar (PH–PKR)
N17	Semerah	46,640	Mohd Fared Mohd Khalid (BN–UMNO)	12,542	44.94%	4,041	Kamarolzaman Mohd Jidi (PUTRA)	247	0.88%	27,916	Mohd Khuzzan Abu Bakar (PH–PKR)
N18	Sri Medan	32,696	Zulkurnain Kamisan (BN–UMNO)	13,165	60.52%	6,274	Halim Othman Kepol (PN–PAS)	6,891	31.68%	21,752	Zulkurnain Kamisan (BN–UMNO)
N18	Sri Medan	32,696	Zulkurnain Kamisan (BN–UMNO)	13,165	60.52%	6,274	Azmi Masrani (PH–PKR)	1,537	7.07%	21,752	Zulkurnain Kamisan (BN–UMNO)
N18	Sri Medan	32,696	Zulkurnain Kamisan (BN–UMNO)	13,165	60.52%	6,274	Mohd Firdaus Abdul Malek (PEJUANG)	159	0.73%	21,752	Zulkurnain Kamisan (BN–UMNO)
N19	Yong Peng	33,053	Ling Tian Soon (BN–MCA)	9,870	52.84%	2,741	Alan Tee Boon Tsong (PH–DAP)	7,129	38.16%	18,680	Chew Peck Choo (PH–DAP)
N19	Yong Peng	33,053	Ling Tian Soon (BN–MCA)	9,870	52.84%	2,741	Susan Yong Fui Ling (PN–GERAKAN)	1,681	9.00%	18,680	Chew Peck Choo (PH–DAP)
N20	Semarang	27,734	Samsolbari Jamali (BN–UMNO)	11,122	61.93%	5,846	Shazani A. Hamid (PN–BERSATU)	5,276	29.38%	17,959	Samsolbari Jamali (BN–UMNO)
N20	Semarang	27,734	Samsolbari Jamali (BN–UMNO)	11,122	61.93%	5,846	Haryati Abu Nasir (PH–PKR)	1,331	7.41%	17,959	Samsolbari Jamali (BN–UMNO)
N20	Semarang	27,734	Samsolbari Jamali (BN–UMNO)	11,122	61.93%	5,846	Adzlan Raju (PEJUANG)	230	1.28%	17,959	Samsolbari Jamali (BN–UMNO)
N21	Parit Yaani	41,851	Mohd Najib Samuri (BN–UMNO)	9,070	38.56%	294	Aminolhuda Hassan (PH–AMANAH)	8,776	37.31%	23,520	Aminolhuda Hassan (PH–AMANAH)
N21	Parit Yaani	41,851	Mohd Najib Samuri (BN–UMNO)	9,070	38.56%	294	Ahmad Nawfal Mahfodz (PN–PAS)	5,435	23.11%	23,520	Aminolhuda Hassan (PH–AMANAH)
N21	Parit Yaani	41,851	Mohd Najib Samuri (BN–UMNO)	9,070	38.56%	294	Mohd Ridhauddin Mohd Tahir (PEJUANG)	239	1.02%	23,520	Aminolhuda Hassan (PH–AMANAH)
N22	Parit Raja	36,059	Nor Rashidah Ramli (BN–UMNO)	10,634	49.57%	4,219	Zulkifli Mat Daud (PN–BERSATU)	6,415	29.90%	21,452	Nor Rashidah Ramli (BN–UMNO)
N22	Parit Raja	36,059	Nor Rashidah Ramli (BN–UMNO)	10,634	49.57%	4,219	Fikri Musa (MUDA)	3,893	18.15%	21,452	Nor Rashidah Ramli (BN–UMNO)
N22	Parit Raja	36,059	Nor Rashidah Ramli (BN–UMNO)	10,634	49.57%	4,219	Abdul Lateef Mahrani (PEJUANG)	510	2.38%	21,452	Nor Rashidah Ramli (BN–UMNO)
N23	Penggaram	69,092	Gan Peck Cheng (PH–DAP)	18,208	53.67%	9,956	Ter Hwa Kwong (BN–MCA)	8,252	24.32%	33,926	Gan Peck Cheng (PH–DAP)
N23	Penggaram	69,092	Gan Peck Cheng (PH–DAP)	18,208	53.67%	9,956	Ronald Sia Wee Yet (PN–BERSATU)	5,276	15.55%	33,926	Gan Peck Cheng (PH–DAP)
N23	Penggaram	69,092	Gan Peck Cheng (PH–DAP)	18,208	53.67%	9,956	Zahari Osman (IND)	2,190	6.46%	33,926	Gan Peck Cheng (PH–DAP)
N24	Senggarang	37,374	Mohd Yusla Ismail (BN–UMNO)	9,725	45.11%	3,912	Abdul Hamid Jamah (PH–AMANAH)	5,813	26.87%	21,557	Khairuddin A. Rahim (PH–PKR)
N24	Senggarang	37,374	Mohd Yusla Ismail (BN–UMNO)	9,725	45.11%	3,912	Kahirul Faizi Ahmad Kamil (PN–PAS)	5,624	26.09%	21,557	Khairuddin A. Rahim (PH–PKR)
N24	Senggarang	37,374	Mohd Yusla Ismail (BN–UMNO)	9,725	45.11%	3,912	Baharudin Abdullah (IND)	227	1.05%	21,557	Khairuddin A. Rahim (PH–PKR)
N24	Senggarang	37,374	Mohd Yusla Ismail (BN–UMNO)	9,725	45.11%	3,912	Zalihah Jaffar (PEJUANG)	168	0.78%	21,557	Khairuddin A. Rahim (PH–PKR)
N25	Rengit	27,123	Mohd Puad Zarkashi (BN–UMNO)	7,903	48.92%	1,920	Mohammad Huzair Lajis (PN–BERSATU)	5,983	37.03%	16,157	Ayub Jamil (BN–UMNO)
N25	Rengit	27,123	Mohd Puad Zarkashi (BN–UMNO)	7,903	48.92%	1,920	Khairuddin A. Rahim (PH–PKR)	2,065	12.78%	16,157	Ayub Jamil (BN–UMNO)
N25	Rengit	27,123	Mohd Puad Zarkashi (BN–UMNO)	7,903	48.92%	1,920	Nizam Bashir Abdul Kariem Bashir (PEJUANG)	206	1.27%	16,157	Ayub Jamil (BN–UMNO)
N26	Machap	33,764	Onn Hafiz Ghazi (BN–UMNO)	11,029	56.63%	6,543	Azlisham Azhar (PN–PAS)	4,486	23.04%	19,473	Abd. Taib Abu Bakar (BN–UMNO)
N26	Machap	33,764	Onn Hafiz Ghazi (BN–UMNO)	11,029	56.63%	6,543	Sangaran Rawisandran (MUDA)	3,493	17.94%	19,473	Abd. Taib Abu Bakar (BN–UMNO)
N26	Machap	33,764	Onn Hafiz Ghazi (BN–UMNO)	11,029	56.63%	6,543	Shahruddin Md Salleh (PEJUANG)	465	2.39%	19,473	Abd. Taib Abu Bakar (BN–UMNO)
N27	Layang-Layang	25,147	Abd. Mutalip Abd. Rahim (BN–UMNO)	7,551	55.00%	2,815	Maszlee Malik (PH–PKR)	4,736	34.50%	13,729	Onn Hafiz Ghazi (BN–UMNO)
N27	Layang-Layang	25,147	Abd. Mutalip Abd. Rahim (BN–UMNO)	7,551	55.00%	2,815	Alagenthiran Krishnan (PN–BERSATU)	1,278	9.31%	13,729	Onn Hafiz Ghazi (BN–UMNO)
N27	Layang-Layang	25,147	Abd. Mutalip Abd. Rahim (BN–UMNO)	7,551	55.00%	2,815	Ahmad Shafiq Othman (PEJUANG)	164	1.19%	13,729	Onn Hafiz Ghazi (BN–UMNO)
N28	Mengkibol	66,362	Chew Chong Sin (PH–DAP)	19,813	58.90%	10,107	Kelly Chye Pei Yee (BN–MCA)	9,706	28.86%	33,635	Chew Chong Sin (PH–DAP)
N28	Mengkibol	66,362	Chew Chong Sin (PH–DAP)	19,813	58.90%	10,107	Kevin Wong Chan Giap (PN–BERSATU)	4,116	12.24%	33,635	Chew Chong Sin (PH–DAP)
N29	Mahkota	65,074	Sharifah Azizah Syed Zain (BN–UMNO)	16,611	45.86%	5,166	Muhammad Taqiuddin Cheman (PH–AMANAH)	11,445	31.59%	36,225	Muhamad Said Jonit (PH–PKR)
N29	Mahkota	65,074	Sharifah Azizah Syed Zain (BN–UMNO)	16,611	45.86%	5,166	Mohamad Nor Lingan (PN–BERSATU)	7,614	21.02%	36,225	Muhamad Said Jonit (PH–PKR)
N29	Mahkota	65,074	Sharifah Azizah Syed Zain (BN–UMNO)	16,611	45.86%	5,166	Mohamed Noor Suleiman (WARISAN)	555	1.53%	36,225	Muhamad Said Jonit (PH–PKR)
N30	Paloh	25,831	Lee Ting Han (BN–MCA)	8,077	55.05%	3,176	Sheikh Umar Bagharib Ali (PH–DAP)	4,901	33.41%	14,671	Sheikh Umar Bagharib Ali (PH–DAP)
N30	Paloh	25,831	Lee Ting Han (BN–MCA)	8,077	55.05%	3,176	Selvendran Velu (PN–PAS)	1,512	10.31%	14,671	Sheikh Umar Bagharib Ali (PH–DAP)
N30	Paloh	25,831	Lee Ting Han (BN–MCA)	8,077	55.05%	3,176	Aminuddin Johari (PEJUANG)	181	1.23%	14,671	Sheikh Umar Bagharib Ali (PH–DAP)
N31	Kahang	29,343	Vidyananthan Ramanadhan (BN–MIC)	10,486	62.69%	6,698	Daud Yusof (PN–BERSATU)	3,788	22.64%	16,728	Vidyananthan Ramanadhan (BN–MIC)
N31	Kahang	29,343	Vidyananthan Ramanadhan (BN–MIC)	10,486	62.69%	6,698	Rahani Banu Abd Rahman Krishnan (PH–AMANAH)	2,181	13.04%	16,728	Vidyananthan Ramanadhan (BN–MIC)
N31	Kahang	29,343	Vidyananthan Ramanadhan (BN–MIC)	10,486	62.69%	6,698	Rosdi Amir (PEJUANG)	273	1.63%	16,728	Vidyananthan Ramanadhan (BN–MIC)
N32	Endau	27,924	Alwiyah Talib (PN–BERSATU)	8,433	55.48%	3,041	Mohd Youzaimi Yusof (BN–UMNO)	5,392	35.47%	15,201	Alwiyah Talib (PN–BERSATU)
N32	Endau	27,924	Alwiyah Talib (PN–BERSATU)	8,433	55.48%	3,041	Mohamad Fakrulrazi Mahmud (PH–AMANAH)	1,154	7.59%	15,201	Alwiyah Talib (PN–BERSATU)
N32	Endau	27,924	Alwiyah Talib (PN–BERSATU)	8,433	55.48%	3,041	Mohd Noorhisyam Ibrahim (PEJUANG)	145	0.95%	15,201	Alwiyah Talib (PN–BERSATU)
N32	Endau	27,924	Alwiyah Talib (PN–BERSATU)	8,433	55.48%	3,041	Ismail Don (IND)	77	0.51%	15,201	Alwiyah Talib (PN–BERSATU)
N33	Tenggaroh	38,408	Raven Kumar Krishnasamy (BN–MIC)	10,528	49.10%	1,356	Roslan Nikmat (PN–PAS)	9,172	42.78%	21,442	Raven Kumar Krishnasamy (BN–MIC)
N33	Tenggaroh	38,408	Raven Kumar Krishnasamy (BN–MIC)	10,528	49.10%	1,356	Zulinah A. Johari (PH–PKR)	1,529	7.13%	21,442	Raven Kumar Krishnasamy (BN–MIC)
N33	Tenggaroh	38,408	Raven Kumar Krishnasamy (BN–MIC)	10,528	49.10%	1,356	Mohd Firdaus Abd Rahman (PEJUANG)	213	0.99%	21,442	Raven Kumar Krishnasamy (BN–MIC)
N34	Panti	38,408	Hahasrin Hashim (BN–UMNO)	12,599	57.29%	5,854	Hassan Rasid (PN–BERSATU)	6,745	30.67%	21,992	Hahasrin Hashim (BN–UMNO)
N34	Panti	38,408	Hahasrin Hashim (BN–UMNO)	12,599	57.29%	5,854	Ahmad Daniel Shahrudin (PH–AMANAH)	2,314	10.52%	21,992	Hahasrin Hashim (BN–UMNO)
N34	Panti	38,408	Hahasrin Hashim (BN–UMNO)	12,599	57.29%	5,854	Ahmade Mohd Din (PEJUANG)	334	1.52%	21,992	Hahasrin Hashim (BN–UMNO)
N35	Pasir Raja	28,045	Rashidah Ismail (BN–UMNO)	9,381	58.22%	4,888	Jawahir Husein (PN–BERSATU)	4,493	27.88%	16,115	Rashidah Ismail (BN–UMNO)
N35	Pasir Raja	28,045	Rashidah Ismail (BN–UMNO)	9,381	58.22%	4,888	Mohd Fakhruddin Moslim (PH–PKR)	1,976	12.26%	16,115	Rashidah Ismail (BN–UMNO)
N35	Pasir Raja	28,045	Rashidah Ismail (BN–UMNO)	9,381	58.22%	4,888	Mohd Yusri Yusof (PEJUANG)	265	1.64%	16,115	Rashidah Ismail (BN–UMNO)
N36	Sedili	28,659	Muszaidi Makmor (BN–UMNO)	12,063	63.52%	5,679	Hasnol Hadi Sebalas (PN–BERSATU)	6,384	33.62%	18,991	Rasman Ithnain (PN–BERSATU)
N36	Sedili	28,659	Muszaidi Makmor (BN–UMNO)	12,063	63.52%	5,679	Mat Khairy Samsudin (PH–AMANAH)	333	1.75%	18,991	Rasman Ithnain (PN–BERSATU)
N36	Sedili	28,659	Muszaidi Makmor (BN–UMNO)	12,063	63.52%	5,679	Tariq Ismail Mustafa (PEJUANG)	211	1.11%	18,991	Rasman Ithnain (PN–BERSATU)
N37	Johor Lama	32,658	Norlizah Noh (BN–UMNO)	12,171	60.56%	6,039	Alias Rasman (PN–BERSATU)	6,132	30.51%	20,098	Rosleli Jahari (PN–BERSATU)
N37	Johor Lama	32,658	Norlizah Noh (BN–UMNO)	12,171	60.56%	6,039	Omar Mokhtar Abdul Manap (PH–PKR)	1,527	7.60%	20,098	Rosleli Jahari (PN–BERSATU)
N37	Johor Lama	32,658	Norlizah Noh (BN–UMNO)	12,171	60.56%	6,039	Shukor Ahmad (PEJUANG)	268	1.33%	20,098	Rosleli Jahari (PN–BERSATU)
N38	Penawar	29,933	Fauziah Misri (BN–UMNO)	12,409	66.98%	7,505	Mohd Faizal Asmar (PN–BERSATU)	4,904	26.47%	18,527	Sharifah Azizah Syed Zain (BN–UMNO)
N38	Penawar	29,933	Fauziah Misri (BN–UMNO)	12,409	66.98%	7,505	Norazila Sanip (PH–AMANAH)	693	3.74%	18,527	Sharifah Azizah Syed Zain (BN–UMNO)
N38	Penawar	29,933	Fauziah Misri (BN–UMNO)	12,409	66.98%	7,505	Rahmattullah Kamilin (PEJUANG)	521	2.81%	18,527	Sharifah Azizah Syed Zain (BN–UMNO)
N39	Tanjong Surat	25,132	Aznan Tamin (BN–UMNO)	9,850	66.97%	5,903	Selamat Ujud (PN–PAS)	3,947	26.84%	14,707	Syed Sis Abdul Rahman (BN–UMNO)
N39	Tanjong Surat	25,132	Aznan Tamin (BN–UMNO)	9,850	66.97%	5,903	Rosman Tahir (PH–PKR)	800	5.44%	14,707	Syed Sis Abdul Rahman (BN–UMNO)
N39	Tanjong Surat	25,132	Aznan Tamin (BN–UMNO)	9,850	66.97%	5,903	Samat Atan (PEJUANG)	110	0.75%	14,707	Syed Sis Abdul Rahman (BN–UMNO)
N40	Tiram	105,707	Azizul Bachok (BN–UMNO)	22,939	40.65%	5,281	Karim Deraman (PN–PAS)	17,658	31.30%	56,417	Gopalakrishnan Subramaniam (PH–PKR)
N40	Tiram	105,707	Azizul Bachok (BN–UMNO)	22,939	40.65%	5,281	Gopalakrishnan Subramaniam (PH–PKR)	12,550	22.24%	56,417	Gopalakrishnan Subramaniam (PH–PKR)
N40	Tiram	105,707	Azizul Bachok (BN–UMNO)	22,939	40.65%	5,281	Abdul Aziz Harun (PEJUANG)	1,391	2.47%	56,417	Gopalakrishnan Subramaniam (PH–PKR)
N40	Tiram	105,707	Azizul Bachok (BN–UMNO)	22,939	40.65%	5,281	Mohd Azmi Ali (PBM)	860	1.52%	56,417	Gopalakrishnan Subramaniam (PH–PKR)
N40	Tiram	105,707	Azizul Bachok (BN–UMNO)	22,939	40.65%	5,281	Jayasangkar Jeraman (IND)	654	1.16%	56,417	Gopalakrishnan Subramaniam (PH–PKR)
N40	Tiram	105,707	Azizul Bachok (BN–UMNO)	22,939	40.65%	5,281	Bala Sundaram Perumal (IND)	365	0.65%	56,417	Gopalakrishnan Subramaniam (PH–PKR)
N41	Puteri Wangsa	112,804	Amira Aisya Abdul Aziz (MUDA)	22,884	43.22%	7,114	Ng Yew Aik (BN–MCA)	15,770	29.78%	52,948	Mazlan Bujang (PN–BERSATU)
N41	Puteri Wangsa	112,804	Amira Aisya Abdul Aziz (MUDA)	22,884	43.22%	7,114	Loh Kah Yong (PN–GERAKAN)	8,957	16.92%	52,948	Mazlan Bujang (PN–BERSATU)
N41	Puteri Wangsa	112,804	Amira Aisya Abdul Aziz (MUDA)	22,884	43.22%	7,114	Steven Choong Shiau Yoon (PBM)	2,471	4.67%	52,948	Mazlan Bujang (PN–BERSATU)
N41	Puteri Wangsa	112,804	Amira Aisya Abdul Aziz (MUDA)	22,884	43.22%	7,114	Khairil Anwar Razali (PEJUANG)	2,468	4.66%	52,948	Mazlan Bujang (PN–BERSATU)
N41	Puteri Wangsa	112,804	Amira Aisya Abdul Aziz (MUDA)	22,884	43.22%	7,114	Adzrin Adam (IND)	398	0.75%	52,948	Mazlan Bujang (PN–BERSATU)
N42	Johor Jaya	91,882	Liow Cai Tung (PH–DAP)	19,782	41.73%	1,922	Chan San San (BN–MCA)	17,860	37.68%	47,397	Liow Cai Tung (PH–DAP)
N42	Johor Jaya	91,882	Liow Cai Tung (PH–DAP)	19,782	41.73%	1,922	Ker Ching Sheng (PN–GERAKAN)	8,307	17.53%	47,397	Liow Cai Tung (PH–DAP)
N42	Johor Jaya	91,882	Liow Cai Tung (PH–DAP)	19,782	41.73%	1,922	Victor Chen Hain Kai (WARISAN)	1,448	3.06%	47,397	Liow Cai Tung (PH–DAP)
N43	Permas	103,598	Baharudin Mohd Taib (BN–UMNO)	23,492	41.93%	7,926	Tazul Arifin Nasri (PN–BERSATU)	15,566	27.78%	56,027	Che Zakaria Mohd. Salleh (PN–BERSATU)
N43	Permas	103,598	Baharudin Mohd Taib (BN–UMNO)	23,492	41.93%	7,926	Syed Othman Abdullah (PH–AMANAH)	14,521	25.92%	56,027	Che Zakaria Mohd. Salleh (PN–BERSATU)
N43	Permas	103,598	Baharudin Mohd Taib (BN–UMNO)	23,492	41.93%	7,926	Mohamed Ridza Busu (WARISAN)	1,412	2.52%	56,027	Che Zakaria Mohd. Salleh (PN–BERSATU)
N43	Permas	103,598	Baharudin Mohd Taib (BN–UMNO)	23,492	41.93%	7,926	Mahaya Ahad (PEJUANG)	1,036	1.85%	56,027	Che Zakaria Mohd. Salleh (PN–BERSATU)
N44	Larkin	76,004	Mohd Hairi Mad Shah (BN–UMNO)	16,053	41.77%	6,178	Zulkifli Bujang (PN–BERSATU)	9,875	25.69%	38,433	Mohammad Izhar Ahmad (PN–BERSATU)
N44	Larkin	76,004	Mohd Hairi Mad Shah (BN–UMNO)	16,053	41.77%	6,178	Zamil Najwah Arbain (PH–PKR)	6,448	16.78%	38,433	Mohammad Izhar Ahmad (PN–BERSATU)
N44	Larkin	76,004	Mohd Hairi Mad Shah (BN–UMNO)	16,053	41.77%	6,178	Rasid Abu Bakar (MUDA)	4,948	12.87%	38,433	Mohammad Izhar Ahmad (PN–BERSATU)
N44	Larkin	76,004	Mohd Hairi Mad Shah (BN–UMNO)	16,053	41.77%	6,178	Mohamad Riadz Mohamad Hashim (PEJUANG)	810	2.11%	38,433	Mohammad Izhar Ahmad (PN–BERSATU)
N44	Larkin	76,004	Mohd Hairi Mad Shah (BN–UMNO)	16,053	41.77%	6,178	Norramadan Buan (IND)	299	0.78%	38,433	Mohammad Izhar Ahmad (PN–BERSATU)
N45	Stulang	60,577	Andrew Chen Kah Eng (PH–DAP)	12,499	44.84%	2,866	Ang Boon Heng (BN–MCA)	9,633	34.56%	27,874	Andrew Chen Kah Eng (PH–DAP)
N45	Stulang	60,577	Andrew Chen Kah Eng (PH–DAP)	12,499	44.84%	2,866	Yap Chiang Youis (PN–GERAKAN)	3,789	13.59%	27,874	Andrew Chen Kah Eng (PH–DAP)
N45	Stulang	60,577	Andrew Chen Kah Eng (PH–DAP)	12,499	44.84%	2,866	Saiful Bahari Sahari (PBM)	1,359	4.88%	27,874	Andrew Chen Kah Eng (PH–DAP)
N45	Stulang	60,577	Andrew Chen Kah Eng (PH–DAP)	12,499	44.84%	2,866	Moharam Baharom (IND)	594	2.13%	27,874	Andrew Chen Kah Eng (PH–DAP)
N46	Perling	101,263	Liew Chin Tong (PH–DAP)	18,628	43.58%	3,347	Tan Hiang Kee (BN–MCA)	15,281	35.76%	42,738	Cheo Yee How (PH–DAP)
N46	Perling	101,263	Liew Chin Tong (PH–DAP)	18,628	43.58%	3,347	Koo Shiaw Lee (PN–GERAKAN)	8,829	20.66%	42,738	Cheo Yee How (PH–DAP)
N47	Kempas	62,011	Ramlee Bohani (BN–UMNO)	11,919	38.92%	3,514	Napsiah Khamis Maharan (PH–PKR)	8,405	27.44%	30,627	VAC
N47	Kempas	62,011	Ramlee Bohani (BN–UMNO)	11,919	38.92%	3,514	Nur Faizal Abdullah (PN–BERSATU)	8,036	26.24%	30,627	VAC
N47	Kempas	62,011	Ramlee Bohani (BN–UMNO)	11,919	38.92%	3,514	Nornekman Osman (PEJUANG)	1,358	4.43%	30,627	VAC
N47	Kempas	62,011	Ramlee Bohani (BN–UMNO)	11,919	38.92%	3,514	Mohd Hambali Munadi (IND)	480	1.57%	30,627	VAC
N47	Kempas	62,011	Ramlee Bohani (BN–UMNO)	11,919	38.92%	3,514	Azwan Abd Rahman (IND)	271	0.88%	30,627	VAC
N47	Kempas	62,011	Ramlee Bohani (BN–UMNO)	11,919	38.92%	3,514	Mohd Suhimi A. Rahman (IND)	158	0.52%	30,627	VAC
N48	Skudai	102,828	Marina Ibrahim (PH–DAP)	26,359	58.53%	13,943	Lim Soon Hai (BN–MCA)	12,416	27.57%	45,033	Tan Hong Pin (PH–DAP)
N48	Skudai	102,828	Marina Ibrahim (PH–DAP)	26,359	58.53%	13,943	Khoo Kong Ek (PN–BERSATU)	6,258	13.90%	45,033	Tan Hong Pin (PH–DAP)
N49	Kota Iskandar	116,415	Pandak Ahmad (BN–UMNO)	23,133	40.78%	4,360	Dzulkefly Ahmad (PH–AMANAH)	18,773	33.10%	56,714	Dzulkefly Ahmad (PH–AMANAH)
N49	Kota Iskandar	116,415	Pandak Ahmad (BN–UMNO)	23,133	40.78%	4,360	Shamsuddin Ismail (PN–BERSATU)	12,503	22.05%	56,714	Dzulkefly Ahmad (PH–AMANAH)
N49	Kota Iskandar	116,415	Pandak Ahmad (BN–UMNO)	23,133	40.78%	4,360	Zaini Abu Bakar (PEJUANG)	1,308	2.31%	56,714	Dzulkefly Ahmad (PH–AMANAH)
N49	Kota Iskandar	116,415	Pandak Ahmad (BN–UMNO)	23,133	40.78%	4,360	Arangkannal Rajoo (PSM)	997	1.76%	56,714	Dzulkefly Ahmad (PH–AMANAH)
N50	Bukit Permai	39,611	Mohd Jafni Md Shukor (BN–UMNO)	10,889	48.36%	4,755	Azrol Rahani (MUDA)	6,134	27.24%	22,516	Tosrin Jarvanthi (PN–BERSATU)
N50	Bukit Permai	39,611	Mohd Jafni Md Shukor (BN–UMNO)	10,889	48.36%	4,755	Tosrin Jarvanthi (PN–BERSATU)	5,108	22.69%	22,516	Tosrin Jarvanthi (PN–BERSATU)
N50	Bukit Permai	39,611	Mohd Jafni Md Shukor (BN–UMNO)	10,889	48.36%	4,755	Mokhtar Abdul Wahab (PEJUANG)	385	1.71%	22,516	Tosrin Jarvanthi (PN–BERSATU)
N51	Bukit Batu	46,237	Arthur Chong Sen Sern (PH–PKR)	9,439	39.20%	137	Supayyah Solaimuthu (BN–MIC)	9,302	38.63%	24,079	Jimmy Puah Wee Tse (PH–PKR)
N51	Bukit Batu	46,237	Arthur Chong Sen Sern (PH–PKR)	9,439	39.20%	137	Tan Heng Choon (PN–GERAKAN)	3,989	16.57%	24,079	Jimmy Puah Wee Tse (PH–PKR)
N51	Bukit Batu	46,237	Arthur Chong Sen Sern (PH–PKR)	9,439	39.20%	137	Lee Ming Wen (WARISAN)	1,349	5.60%	24,079	Jimmy Puah Wee Tse (PH–PKR)
N52	Senai	63,717	Wong Bor Yang (PH–DAP)	16,525	51.75%	5,921	Shen Poh Kuan (BN–MCA)	10,604	33.21%	31,931	Alan Tee Boon Tsong (PH–DAP)
N52	Senai	63,717	Wong Bor Yang (PH–DAP)	16,525	51.75%	5,921	Yeo Kwee Kwang (PN–BERSATU)	4,802	15.04%	31,931	Alan Tee Boon Tsong (PH–DAP)
N53	Benut	28,165	Hasni Mohammad (BN–UMNO)	10,896	63.09%	5,859	Isa Abd. Hamid (PN–BERSATU)	5,037	29.16%	17,272	Hasni Mohammad (BN–UMNO)
N53	Benut	28,165	Hasni Mohammad (BN–UMNO)	10,896	63.09%	5,859	Haniff Hosman (PH–PKR)	1,200	6.95%	17,272	Hasni Mohammad (BN–UMNO)
N53	Benut	28,165	Hasni Mohammad (BN–UMNO)	10,896	63.09%	5,859	Iskandar Noor Ibrahim (PEJUANG)	139	0.80%	17,272	Hasni Mohammad (BN–UMNO)
N54	Pulai Sebatang	46,991	Hasrunizah Hassan (BN–UMNO)	12,473	50.06%	6,325	Suhaizan Kayat (PH–AMANAH)	6,148	24.67%	24,917	Muhammad Taqiuddin Cheman (PH–AMANAH)
N54	Pulai Sebatang	46,991	Hasrunizah Hassan (BN–UMNO)	12,473	50.06%	6,325	Abdullah Husin (PN–PAS)	5,967	23.95%	24,917	Muhammad Taqiuddin Cheman (PH–AMANAH)
N54	Pulai Sebatang	46,991	Hasrunizah Hassan (BN–UMNO)	12,473	50.06%	6,325	Abdul Rashid Abdul Hadi (PEJUANG)	329	1.32%	24,917	Muhammad Taqiuddin Cheman (PH–AMANAH)
N55	Pekan Nanas	35,865	Tan Eng Meng (BN–MCA)	11,024	51.54%	4,835	Yeo Tung Siong (PH–DAP)	6,189	28.93%	21,392	Yeo Tung Siong (PH–DAP)
N55	Pekan Nanas	35,865	Tan Eng Meng (BN–MCA)	11,024	51.54%	4,835	Tan Chin Hock (PN–GERAKAN)	2,741	12.81%	21,392	Yeo Tung Siong (PH–DAP)
N55	Pekan Nanas	35,865	Tan Eng Meng (BN–MCA)	11,024	51.54%	4,835	Hishamuddin Busri (WARISAN)	1,438	6.72%	21,392	Yeo Tung Siong (PH–DAP)
N56	Kukup	34,624	Jefridin Atan (BN–UMNO)	11,640	60.36%	8,201	Mahahtir Iskandar Muhammad (PN–BERSATU)	3,439	17.84%	19,282	Md Othman Yusof (BN–UMNO)
N56	Kukup	34,624	Jefridin Atan (BN–UMNO)	11,640	60.36%	8,201	Mohd Zaiful Bakri (PH–PKR)	3,276	16.99%	19,282	Md Othman Yusof (BN–UMNO)
N56	Kukup	34,624	Jefridin Atan (BN–UMNO)	11,640	60.36%	8,201	Zamzam Hashim (PEJUANG)	927	4.81%	19,282	Md Othman Yusof (BN–UMNO)
