= Johor State Executive Council =

Executive authority of the Government of Johor, Malaysia

- 2026–present
- Date formed: 12 July 2026

People and organisations
- Head of state: Sultan Ibrahim ibni Almarhum Sultan Iskandar Al-Haj
- Head of government: Onn Hafiz Ghazi (UMNO)
- Total no. of members: 11
- Member parties: Barisan Nasional (BN); United Malays National Organisation (UMNO); Malaysian Chinese Association (MCA); Malaysian Indian Congress (MIC)
- Status in legislature: Coalition government 48 / 56
- Opposition parties: Pakatan Harapan (PH); Democratic Action Party (DAP); People's Justice Party (PKR); National Trust Party (AMANAH)

History
- Legislature term: 16th Johor State Legislative Assembly

The Johor State Executive Council is the executive authority of the Government of Johor, Malaysia. The Council comprises the Menteri Besar, appointed by the Sultan on the basis that he is able to command a majority in the Johor State Legislative Assembly, a number of members made up of members of the Assembly, the State Secretary, the State Legal Adviser and the State Financial Officer.

This Council is similar in structure and role to the Cabinet of Malaysia, while being smaller in size. As federal and state responsibilities differ, there are a number of portfolios that differ between the federal and state governments.

Members of the Council are selected by the Menteri Besar, appointed by the Sultan. The Council has no ministry, but instead a number of committees; each committee will take care of certain state affairs, activities and departments. Members of the Council are always the chair of a committee.

== Ex officio members ==
Position	Office bearer
State Secretary	Mohammed Ridha Abd Kadir
State Legal Adviser	Abd Aziz Engan
State Financial Officer	Mohd Norazam Osman

== Lists of full members ==
=== Onn Hafiz II EXCO (since 2026) ===
Members

BN (11)
- UMNO (8)
- MCA (2)
- MIC (1)

Members since 12 July 2026 have been:

Name	Portfolio	Party	Constituency	Term start	Term end
Onn Hafiz Ghazi (Menteri Besar)	Natural Resources; Administration; Finance; Planning; Economic Development; Tourism	UMNO	Machap	12 July 2026	Incumbent
Mohd Jafni Md Shukor	Housing; Local Government	UMNO	Bukit Permai	18 July 2026	Incumbent
Mohd Hairi Mad Shah	Youth and Sports; Entrepreneur Development; Corporations	UMNO	Larkin	18 July 2026	Incumbent
Mohd Fared Mohd Khalid	Islamic Religious Affairs	UMNO	Semerah	18 July 2026	Incumbent
Mohamad Fazli Mohamad Salleh	Works; Transportation; Infrastructure; Communication	UMNO	Bukit Pasir	18 July 2026	Incumbent
Md Israk Abdullah	Agriculture; Agro-based Industry; Rural Development	UMNO	Kukup	18 July 2026	Incumbent
Muhammad Naqib Md Ghazali	Education; Information	UMNO	Panti	18 July 2026	Incumbent
Hasrunizah Hassan	Women; Family; Community Development	UMNO	Pulai Sebatang	18 July 2026	Incumbent
Ling Tian Soon	Health; Environment; New Village	MCA	Yong Peng	18 July 2026	Incumbent
Lee Ting Han	Investment; Trade; Consumer Affairs; Human Resources	MCA	Paloh	18 July 2026	Incumbent
Pannir Selvam Paliksina	Unity; Culture; Heritage	MIC	Perling	18 July 2026	Incumbent

Deputy Members

BN (10)
- UMNO (7)
- MCA (2)
- MIC (1)

Members since 22 July 2026 have been:

Name	Portfolio	Party	Constituency	Term start	Term end
Zaidi Japar	Housing; Local Government	UMNO	Rengit	22 July 2026	Incumbent
Nadhirah Afiqah Abdul Rahim	Youth and Sports; Entrepreneur Development; Corporations	UMNO	Serom	22 July 2026	Incumbent
Anuar Abdul Manap	Islamic Religious Affairs	UMNO	Pemanis	22 July 2026	Incumbent
Mohammad Najib Samuri	Works; Transportation; Infrastructure; Communication	UMNO	Parit Yaani	22 July 2026	Incumbent
Sahrihan Jani	Agriculture; Agro-based Industry; Rural Development	UMNO	Gambir	22 July 2026	Incumbent
Rugendren Velleyan	Education; Information	MIC	Kahang	22 July 2026	Incumbent
Chan San San	Women; Family; Community Development	MCA	Johor Jaya	22 July 2026	Incumbent
Mohd Youzaimi Yusof	Health; Environment; New Village	UMNO	Tenggaroh	22 July 2026	Incumbent
Syed Hussein Syed Abdullah	Investment; Trade; Consumer Affairs; Human Resources	UMNO	Mahkota	22 July 2026	Incumbent
Chua Jian Boon	Unity; Culture; Heritage	MCA	Layang-Layang	22 July 2026	Incumbent

== Former compositions ==
=== Onn Hafiz I EXCO (2022–2026) ===
BN (11)
- UMNO (8)
- MCA (2)
- MIC (1)

Members from 15 March 2022 to 12 July 2026 were:

Name	Portfolio	Party	Constituency	Term start	Term end
Onn Hafiz Ghazi (Menteri Besar)	Natural Resources; Administration; Finance; Planning; Economic Development; Tourism (2024–present)	UMNO	Machap	15 March 2022	Incumbent
Zahari Sarip	Agriculture; Agro-based Industry; Rural Development	UMNO	Buloh Kasap	26 March 2022	Incumbent
Mohd Jafni Md Shukor	Housing; Local Government	UMNO	Bukit Permai	26 March 2022	Incumbent
Khairin Nisa	Women; Family; Community Development	UMNO	Serom	26 March 2022	Incumbent
Mohd Hairi Mad Shah	Youth and Sports; Entrepreneur Development; Corporations; Human Resources (2022–2024)	UMNO	Larkin	26 March 2022	Incumbent
Mohd Fared Mohd Khalid	Islamic Religious Affairs	UMNO	Semerah	26 March 2022	Incumbent
Mohamad Fazli Mohamad Salleh	Works; Transportation; Infrastructure; Communication (2024–present)	UMNO	Bukit Pasir	26 March 2022	Incumbent
Norlizah Noh	Education; Information; Communication (2022–2024)	UMNO	Johor Lama	26 March 2022	13 February 2024
Aznan Tamin	Education; Information	UMNO	Tanjung Surat	13 February 2024	Incumbent
Ling Tian Soon	Health; Unity (2022–2024); Environment; New Village	MCA	Yong Peng	26 March 2022	Incumbent
Lee Ting Han	Investment; Trade; Consumer Affairs; Human Resources (2024–present)	MCA	Paloh	26 March 2022	Incumbent
Raven Kumar Krishnasamy	Tourism (2022–2024); Environment (2022–2024); Unity (2024–present); Culture; Heritage	MIC	Tenggaroh	26 March 2022	Incumbent

=== Hasni EXCO (2020–2022) ===
BN (6)	PN (3)	Independent (2)
UMNO (5); MIC (1)	BERSATU (3)	Independent (2)

Members from 28 February 2020 to 15 March 2022 were :

Name	Portfolio	Party	Constituency	Term start	Term end
Hasni Mohammad (Menteri Besar)	Natural Resources; Administration; Finance; Planning and Economic Development	BN (UMNO)	Benut	28 February 2020	15 March 2022
Samsolbari Jamali	Agriculture; Agro-based Industry; Rural Development	BN (UMNO)	Semarang	6 March 2020	15 March 2022
Ayub Jamil	Housing; Local Government	BN (UMNO)	Rengit	6 March 2020	15 March 2022
Zaiton Ismail	Women, Family and Community Development	BN (UMNO)	Sungai Balang	6 March 2020	15 March 2022
Onn Hafiz Ghazi	Tourism; Youth; Sports	BN (UMNO)	Layang-Layang	6 March 2020	15 March 2022
Vidyananthan Ramanadhan	Health; Environment	BN (MIC)	Kahang	6 March 2020	15 March 2022
Tosrin Jarvanthi	Islamic Affairs	PN (BERSATU)	Bukit Permai	6 March 2020	15 March 2022
Mohd Solihan Badri	Works; Transport; Infrastructure	PN (BERSATU)	Tenang	6 March 2020	15 March 2022
Mazlan Bujang	Education; Information; Heritage; Culture	PN (BERSATU)	Puteri Wangsa	6 March 2020	27 January 2022
Mazlan Bujang	Education; Information; Heritage; Culture	Independent	Puteri Wangsa	27 January 2022	15 March 2022
Mohammad Izhar Ahmad	Investment; Entrepreneur Development; Cooperatives; Human Resources	PN (BERSATU)	Larkin	6 March 2020	29 January 2022
Mohammad Izhar Ahmad	Investment; Entrepreneur Development; Cooperatives; Human Resources	Independent	Larkin	29 January 2022	15 March 2022
Chong Fat Full	Unity; Trade; Consumer Affairs	Independent	Pemanis	6 March 2020	27 August 2020
Chong Fat Full	Unity; Trade; Consumer Affairs	PN (BERSATU)	Pemanis	27 August 2020	15 March 2022

=== Sahruddin EXCO (2019–2020) ===
Name	Portfolio	Party	Constituency	Term start	Term end
Sahruddin Jamal (Menteri Besar)	Natural Resources; Administration; Finance; Economic Planning and Development	BERSATU	Bukit Kepong	14 April 2019	28 February 2020
Tosrin Jarvanthi	Islamic Affairs; Agriculture; Rural Development	BERSATU	Bukit Permai	22 April 2019	28 February 2020
Mohd Solihan Badri	Works; Transport; Infrastructure	BERSATU	Tenang	22 April 2019	28 February 2020
Liow Cai Tung	Tourism; Women, Family and Community Development	DAP	Johor Jaya	22 April 2019	28 February 2020
Ramakrishnan Suppiah	Unity; Domestic Trade; Consumer Affairs	DAP	Bekok	22 April 2019	28 February 2020
Sheikh Umar Bagharib Ali	Youth and Sports; Entrepreneur Development; Cooperatives	DAP	Paloh	22 April 2019	28 February 2020
Tan Chen Choon	Local Government; Urban Wellbeing; Environment	DAP	Jementah	22 April 2019	28 February 2020
Jimmy Puah Wee Tse	International Trade; Investment; Utilities	PKR	Bukit Batu	22 April 2019	28 February 2020
Mohd Khuzzan Abu Bakar	Health; Culture; Heritage	PKR	Semerah	22 April 2019	28 February 2020
Aminolhuda Hassan	Education; Human Resources; Science; Technology	AMANAH	Parit Yaani	22 April 2019	28 February 2020
Dzulkefly Ahmad	Housing; Communications; Multimedia	AMANAH	Kota Iskandar	22 April 2019	28 February 2020

=== Osman EXCO (2018–2019) ===
Name	Portfolio	Party	Constituency	Term start	Term end
Osman Sapian (Menteri Besar)	Land Revenue; Administration; Finance; Planning; Economic Development	BERSATU	Kempas	12 May 2018	2019
Aminolhuda Hassan	Islamic Affairs; Education	AMANAH	Parit Yaani	16 May 2018	2019
Dzulkefly Ahmad	Housing; Rural Development	AMANAH	Kota Iskandar	16 May 2018	2019
Tan Hong Pin	Local Government; Science and Technology	DAP	Skudai	16 May 2018	2019
Dr. Ramakrishnan Suppiah	Consumerism; Human Resources; Unity	DAP	Bekok	16 May 2018	2019
Mazlan Bujang	Public Works; Infrastructure; Transportation	BERSATU	Puteri Wangsa	16 May 2018	2019
Jimmy Puah Wee Tse	Investment; Utilities	PKR	Bukit Batu	16 May 2018	2019
Liow Cai Tung	Women Development; Tourism	DAP	Johor Jaya	16 May 2018	2019
Mohd Khuzzan Abu Bakar	Youth and Sports; Culture	PKR	Semerah	16 May 2018	2019
Dr. Sahruddin Jamal	Health; Environment; Agriculture	BERSATU	Bukit Kepong	16 May 2018	2019
Sheikh Umar Bagharib Ali	Entrepreneurial Development; Cooperatives; Creative Economy	DAP	Paloh	16 May 2018	2019

=== Mohamed Khaled EXCO (2013–2018) ===
UMNO (9) MCA (1) MIC (1)

Name	Portfolio	Party	Constituency	Term start	Term end
Mohamed Khaled Nordin (Menteri Besar)	Natural Resources; Administration; Finance and Planning	UMNO	Permas	14 May 2013	12 May 2018
Md Jais Sarday	Education (2013–2017); Information (2013–2017); Entrepreneurship Development and Co-operatives (2013–2017); Housing (2017–2018); Local Government (2017–2018)	UMNO	Mahkota	14 May 2013	12 May 2018
Asiah Md Ariff	Women; Family; Community Development	UMNO	Johor Lama	14 May 2013	12 May 2018
Tee Siew Kiong	Tourism; Trade; Consumerism	MCA	Pulai Sebatang	14 May 2013	12 May 2018
Hasni Mohammad	Public Works; Rural; Regional Development	UMNO	Benut	14 May 2013	12 May 2018
Vidyananthan Ramanadhan	Unity; Human Resources	MIC	Kahang	14 May 2013	12 May 2018
Abd Mutalip Abd Rahim	Religious Affairs	UMNO	Layang-Layang	14 May 2013	12 May 2018
Abd Latif Bandi	Housing; Local Government	UMNO	Endau	14 May 2013	2017
Ismail Mohamed	Agriculture; Agro-based Industry	UMNO	Bukit Serampang	14 May 2013	12 May 2018
Zulkurnain Kamisan	Youth and Sports; Culture; Heritage	UMNO	Sri Medan	14 May 2013	12 May 2018
Ayub Rahmat	Health; Environment	UMNO	Kemelah	14 May 2013	12 May 2018

=== Abdul Ajib I EXCO (1982–1986) ===
UMNO (7) MCA (2)

Name	Portfolio	Party	Constituency	Term start	Term end
Abdul Ajib Ahmad (Menteri Besar)	Taxation; Land; Administration; Finance	UMNO	Endau	29 April 1982	12 August 1986
Abdul Rahman Mahmud	Culture; Youth and Sports	UMNO	Jorak	1982	12 August 1986
Mohd. Yunus Sulaiman	Religious Affairs	UMNO	Gelang Patah	1982	12 August 1986
Abdul Jalal Abu Bakar	Agriculture; Fisheries	UMNO	Rengit	1982	12 August 1986
Yusof Malim Kuning	Unity; Social Welfare	UMNO	Kota Tinggi	1982	12 August 1986
Law Lai Heng	Energy; Environment	MCA	Ayer Panas	1982	12 August 1986
Hasmuni Salim	Housing; Urban; Local Government	UMNO	Benut	1982	12 August 1986
Mohd Sham Sailan	Aboriginal Affairs	UMNO	Sri Menanti	1982	12 August 1986
Law Boon King @ Low Boon Hong	Works; Public Utilities	MCA	Layang-Layang	1982	12 August 1986

== See also ==
- Sultan of Johor
- List of Menteris Besar of Johor
- Johor State Legislative Assembly
