= Abd Mutalip Abd Rahim =

Malaysian politician

Abd Mutalip Abd Rahim PSI II
- عبدالمطالب بن عبدالرحيم

Member of the Johor State Executive Council (Religion)
- In office 14 May 2013 – 12 May 2018
- Monarch: Ibrahim Iskandar
- Menteri Besar: Mohamed Khaled Nordin
- Preceded by: Zainal Abidin Osman
- Succeeded by: Aminolhuda Hassan
- Constituency: Layang-Layang

Member of the Johor State Legislative Assembly for Layang-Layang
- In office 12 March 2022 – 11 July 2026
- Preceded by: Onn Hafiz Ghazi (BN–UMNO)
- Succeeded by: Chua Jian Boon (BN–MCA)
- Majority: 2,815 (2022)
- In office 5 May 2013 – 9 May 2018
- Preceded by: Onn Mohd Yassin (BN–UMNO)
- Succeeded by: Onn Hafiz Ghazi (BN–UMNO)
- Majority: 2,518 (2013)

Personal details
- Born: Abd Mutalip bin Abd Rahim Johor, Malaysia
- Citizenship: Malaysian
- Party: United Malays National Organisation (UMNO) (until 2026); Malaysian United Indigenous Party (BERSATU) (since 2026)
- Other political affiliations: Barisan Nasional (BN) (until 2026); Perikatan Nasional (since 2026)
- Occupation: Politician

Abd Mutalip bin Abd Rahim is a Malaysian politician who has served as Member of the Johor State Legislative Assembly (MLA) for Layang-Layang from May 2013 to May 2018 and again from March 2022 to July 2026. He served as Member of the Johor State Executive Council (EXCO) in the Barisan Nasional (BN) state administration under former Menteri Besar Mohamed Khaled Nordin from May 2013 to the collapse of the BN state administration in May 2018. He was a member of the United Malays National Organisation (UMNO), a component party of the BN coalition.

On 25 June 2026, Abd Mutalip quit UMNO and joined Malaysian United Indigenous Party (BERSATU) and contesting the same seat under Perikatan Nasional. In the State Election, he defeated and lost the deposit.

== Election results ==
Johor State Legislative Assembly
Year	Constituency	Candidate	Votes	Pct	Opponent(s)	Votes	Pct	Ballots cast	Majority	Turnout
2013	N27 Layang-Layang	Abd Mutalip Abd Rahim (UMNO)	8,613	58.56%	Mohd Ishak Shir Mohd (PKR)	6,095	41.44%	15,098	2,518	84.60%
2022	N27 Layang-Layang	Abd Mutalip Abd Rahim (UMNO)	7,551	55.00%	Maszlee Malik (PKR)	4,736	34.50%	13,729	2,815	54.59%
2022	N27 Layang-Layang	Abd Mutalip Abd Rahim (UMNO)	7,551	55.00%	Alagenthiran Krishnan (BERSATU)	1,278	9.31%	13,729	2,815	54.59%
2022	N27 Layang-Layang	Abd Mutalip Abd Rahim (UMNO)	7,551	55.00%	Ahmad Shafiq Othman (PEJUANG)	164	1.19%	13,729	2,815	54.59%
2026	N27 Layang-Layang	Abd Mutalip Abd Rahim (BERSATU)	1,993	11.56%	Chua Jian Boon (MCA)	11,579	67.17%			
2026	N27 Layang-Layang	Abd Mutalip Abd Rahim (BERSATU)	1,993	11.56%	Guna Balakrishnan (PKR)	3,667	21.27%			

== Honours ==
- Johor
  - Second Class of the Sultan Ibrahim of Johor Medal (PSI II) (2015)
