= Liow Cai Tung =

Malaysian politician

- 廖彩彤

Member of the Johor State Executive Council (Woman Development and Tourism : 16 May 2018 – 13 April 2019) (Tourism, Woman Development, Family and Community : 22 April 2019 – 27 February 2020)
- In office 16 May 2018 – 27 February 2020
- Monarch: Ibrahim Iskandar
- Menteri Besar: Osman Sapian (2018–2019); Sahruddin Jamal (2019–2020)
- Preceded by: Asiah Md Ariff (Woman Development); Tee Siew Kiong (Tourism)
- Succeeded by: Onn Hafiz Ghazi (Tourism); Zaiton Ismail (Woman Development, Family and Community)
- Constituency: Johor Jaya

Member of the Central Executive Committee of the Democratic Action Party
- Incumbent
- Assumed office 16 March 2025 Serving with Chow Kon Yeow & Teo Kok Seong
- Secretary-General: Anthony Loke Siew Fook

Member of the Johor State Legislative Assembly for Johor Jaya
- In office 5 May 2013 – 11 July 2026
- Preceded by: Tan Cher Puk (BN–MCA)
- Succeeded by: Chan San San (BN–MCA)
- Majority: 1,460 (2013); 15,565 (2018); 1,922 (2022)

Personal details
- Born: Liow Cai Tung; 21 January 1986 (age 40) Johor, Malaysia
- Citizenship: Malaysian
- Party: Democratic Action Party (DAP) (2009-Present)
- Other political affiliations: Pakatan Rakyat (PR) (2009–2015); Pakatan Harapan (PH) (since 2015)
- Parent: Ng Siam Luang (mother)
- Occupation: Politician

Liow Cai Tung

Chinese name
- Traditional Chinese: 廖彩彤
- Simplified Chinese: 廖彩彤
Transcriptions
Standard Mandarin
- Hanyu Pinyin: Liào Cǎitóng

Liow Cai Tung (Chinese: 廖彩彤; pinyin: Liào Cǎitóng; born 21 January 1986) is a Malaysian politician who has served as Member of the Johor State Legislative Assembly (MLA) for Johor Jaya since May 2013. She served as Member of the Johor State Executive Council (EXCO) in the Pakatan Harapan (PH) state administration under former Menteris Besar Osman Sapian and Sahruddin Jamal from May 2018 to the collapse of the PH state administration in February 2020. She is a member of the Democratic Action Party (DAP), a component party of the PH and formerly Pakatan Rakyat (PR) coalitions. She has also served as Member of the Central Executive Committee (CEC) of the DAP since March 2025.

== Election results ==
Johor State Legislative Assembly
Year	Constituency	Candidate	Votes	Pct	Opponent(s)	Votes	Pct	Ballots cast	Majority	Turnout
2013	N42 Johor Jaya	Liow Cai Tung (DAP)	22,879	51.44%	Tan Cher Puk (MCA)	21,419	48.16%	45,562	1,460	88.22%
2013	N42 Johor Jaya	Liow Cai Tung (DAP)	22,879	51.44%	Hong Eng Wah (IND)	177	0.40%	45,562	1,460	88.22%
2018	N42 Johor Jaya	Liow Cai Tung (DAP)	32,342	62.53%	Tan Cher Puk (MCA)	16,777	32.44%	52,645	15,565	86.19%
2018	N42 Johor Jaya	Liow Cai Tung (DAP)	32,342	62.53%	Kumutha Raman (PAS)	2,605	5.04%	52,645	15,565	86.19%
2022	N42 Johor Jaya	Liow Cai Tung (DAP)	19,782	41.74%	Chan San San (MCA)	17,860	37.68%	47,397	1,922	51.58%
2022	N42 Johor Jaya	Liow Cai Tung (DAP)	19,782	41.74%	Ker Ching Sheng (Gerakan)	8,307	17.52%	47,397	1,922	51.58%
2022	N42 Johor Jaya	Liow Cai Tung (DAP)	19,782	41.74%	Victor Chen Hain Kai (WARISAN)	1,448	3.06%	47,397	1,922	51.58%
