= Ng Yak Howe =

Malaysian politician

Yang Berhormat Tuan Ng Yak Howe MLA
- 黄益豪

Member of the Johor State Legislative Assembly for Bentayan
- Incumbent
- Assumed office 9 May 2018
- Preceded by: Chua Wee Beng (PR–DAP)
- Majority: 13,629 (2018); 7,476 (2022); 6,112 (2026)

Personal details
- Born: Ng Yak Howe; 17 July 1973 (age 53) Muar, Johor
- Citizenship: Malaysian
- Party: Democratic Action Party (DAP)
- Other political affiliations: Pakatan Harapan
- Spouse: Gan Lee Teng
- Education: National University of Malaysia
- Occupation: Politician

Ng Yak Howe

Chinese name
- Traditional Chinese: 黃益豪
- Simplified Chinese: 黄益豪
Transcriptions
Standard Mandarin
- Hanyu Pinyin: Huáng Yìháo
Yue: Cantonese
- Jyutping: Wong4 Jik1 Hou4
Southern Min
- Hokkien POJ: N̂g Iah-hô
- Tâi-lô: N̂g Iah-hô

Ng Yak Howe is a Malaysian politician from DAP. He has been the Member of Johor State Legislative Assembly for Bentayan since 2018.

== Politics ==
He was the Deputy Chief of DAPSY Johor from 2011 to 2014, Assistant Organising Secretary for DAP Johor from 2013 to 2016 and Organising Secretary for DAP Johor from 2016 to 2021. He is currently a Member of DAP Johor Committee.

== Election result ==
Johor State Legislative Assembly
Year	Constituency	Candidate	Votes	Pct	Opponent(s)	Votes	Pct	Ballots cast	Majority	Turnout
2018	N12 Bentayan	Ng Yak Howe (DAP)	18,278	78.67%	Lee Kim Heng (MCA)	4,649	20.01%	23,234	13,629	83.41%
2022	N12 Bentayan	Ng Yak Howe (DAP)	10,973	63.30%	Gan Q'I Ru (MCA)	3,497	20.17%	17,334	7,476	49.91%
2022	N12 Bentayan	Ng Yak Howe (DAP)	10,973	63.30%	Eddy Tan Kok Hong (Gerakan)	2,534	14.62%	17,334	7,476	49.91%
2026	N12 Bentayan	Ng Yak Howe (DAP)	13,917	64.07%	Chua Lee Huat (MCA)	7,805	35.93%	21,963	6,112	64.21%
