= Tosrin Jarvanthi =

Malaysian politician (born 1950)

Haji Tosrin Jarvanthi AMN PIS BSI
- طوسرين بن جارۏانتي

Member of the Johor State Executive Council (Islamic Religious Affairs, Agriculture & Rural Development : 22 April 2019 – 27 February 2020) (Islamic Religious Affairs : 6 March 2020 – 15 March 2022)
- In office 6 March 2020 – 15 March 2022
- Monarch: Ibrahim Iskandar
- Menteri Besar: Hasni Mohammad
- Preceded by: Himself
- Succeeded by: Mohd Fared Mohd Khalid
- Constituency: Bukit Permai
- In office 22 April 2019 – 27 February 2020
- Monarch: Ibrahim Iskandar
- Menteri Besar: Sahruddin Jamal
- Preceded by: Aminolhuda Hassan (Islamic Religious Affairs); Sahruddin Jamal (Agriculture); Dzulkefly Ahmad (Rural Development)
- Succeeded by: Himself (Islamic Religious Affairs); Samsolbari Jamali (Agriculture & Rural Development)
- Constituency: Bukit Permai

Member of the Johor State Legislative Assembly for Bukit Permai
- In office 9 May 2018 – 12 March 2022
- Preceded by: Ali Mazat Salleh (BN–UMNO)
- Succeeded by: Mohd Jafni Md Shukor (BN–UMNO)
- Majority: 2,531 (2018)

Member of the Johor State Legislative Assembly for Sedili
- In office 3 August 1986 – 21 October 1990
- Preceded by: Position established
- Succeeded by: Mohamadon Abu Bakar (BN–UMNO)
- Majority: 9,840 (1986)

Faction represented in Johor State Legislative Assembly
- 1986–1990: Barisan Nasional
- 2018–2020: Pakatan Harapan
- 2020: Malaysian United Indigenous Party
- 2020–2022: Perikatan Nasional

Personal details
- Born: Tosrin bin Jarvanthi; 8 April 1950 (age 76) Johor, Malaysia
- Citizenship: Malaysian
- Party: United Malays National Organisation (UMNO) (–2016); Malaysian United Indigenous Party (BERSATU) (since 2016)
- Other political affiliations: Barisan Nasional (BN) (–2016); Pakatan Harapan (PH) (2017–2020); Perikatan Nasional (PN) (since 2020)
- Occupation: Politician

Tosrin bin Jarvanthi (born 8 April 1950) is a Malaysian politician who served as Member of the Johor State Executive Council (EXCO) in the Barisan Nasional (BN) state administration under former Menteri Besar Hasni Mohammad from March 2020 to March 2022 and in the Pakatan Harapan (PH) state administration under former Menteri Besar Sahruddin Jamal from April 2019 to the collapse of the PH state administration in February 2020 as well as Member of the Johor State Legislative Assembly (MLA) for Bukit Permai from May 2018 to March 2022 and for Sedili from August 1986 to October 1990. He is a member of the Malaysian United Indigenous Party (BERSATU), a component party of the Perikatan Nasional (PN) and formerly PH coalitions and was a member of the United Malays National Organisation (UMNO), a component party of the BN coalition.

== Election results ==
Johor State Legislative Assembly
Year	Constituency	Candidate	Votes	Pct	Opponent(s)	Votes	Pct	Ballots cast	Majority	Turnout
1986	N27 Sedili	Tosrin Jarvanthi (UMNO)	12,894	80.85%	Mohamad Yusof Hamdan (SDP)	3,054	19.15%	16,937	9,840	71.80%
2018	N50 Bukit Permai	Tosrin Jarvanthi (BERSATU)	10,998	52.73%	Ali Mazat Salleh (UMNO)	8,467	40.60%	21,178	2,531	87.20%
2018	N50 Bukit Permai	Tosrin Jarvanthi (BERSATU)	10,998	52.73%	Abd Aziz Ja'afar (PAS)	1,392	6.67%	21,178	2,531	87.20%
2022	N50 Bukit Permai	Tosrin Jarvanthi (BERSATU)	5,108	22.69%	Mohd Jafni Md Shukor (UMNO)	10,889	48.36 %	22,516	4,755	56.84%
2022	N50 Bukit Permai	Tosrin Jarvanthi (BERSATU)	5,108	22.69%	Azrol A Rahani (MUDA)	6,134	27.24%	22,516	4,755	56.84%
2022	N50 Bukit Permai	Tosrin Jarvanthi (BERSATU)	5,108	22.69%	Mokhtar Abdul Wahab (PEJUANG)	385	1.71%	22,516	4,755	56.84%

== Honours ==
=== Honours of Malaysia ===
- Malaysia
  - Member of the Order of the Defender of the Realm (AMN) (1982)
- Johor
  - Second Class of the Sultan Ibrahim Medal (PIS II)
  - Second Class of the Star of Sultan Ismail (BSI II)
