= Bentayan =

Political subdivision in Malaysia

Bentayan (N12)
Johor constituency

State constituency
- Legislature: Johor State Legislative Assembly
MLA
Ng Yak Howe
PH
- Constituency created: 2003
- First contested: 2004
- Last contested: 2026

Demographics
- Population (2020): 35,795
- Electors (2026): 34,205
- Area (km²): 11

Bentayan is a state constituency in Johor, Malaysia, that is represented in the Johor State Legislative Assembly.

The state constituency was first contested in 2004 and is mandated to return a single Assemblyman to the Johor State Legislative Assembly under the first-past-the-post voting system.

== Demographics ==
As of 2020, Bentayan has a population of 35,795 people.

Ethnic breakdown of Bentayan's electorate as of 2026
1. Chinese (70.0%)
2. Malay (27.0%)
3. Indian (2.40%)
4. Other ethnicities (0.60%)

== History ==
=== Polling districts ===
According to the federal gazette issued on 2 July 2026, the Bentayan constituency has a total of 12 polling districts.

State constituency	Polling Districts	Code	Location
Simpang Jeram (N13)	Jalan Sakeh	145/13/01	SA Tun Dr. Ismail; Dewan Kg. Kenangan Tun Dr. Ismail 2
Simpang Jeram (N13)	Temenggong Ahmad Dalam	145/13/02	SK Parit Keroma Darat
Simpang Jeram (N13)	Sungai Abong	145/13/03	SMK Sungai Abong
Simpang Jeram (N13)	Jalan Haji Abdullah	145/13/04	SK Bakri Batu 2
Simpang Jeram (N13)	Haji Abdullah Selatan	145/13/05	SA Parit Keroma Darat
Simpang Jeram (N13)	Jeram Tengah	145/13/06	SA Seri Bukit Batu
Simpang Jeram (N13)	Bukit Batu	145/13/07	SK Seri Bukit Batu
Simpang Jeram (N13)	Kampong Ulu	145/13/08	SA Bakri Batu Enam
Simpang Jeram (N13)	Simpang Jeram	145/13/09	SK Simpang Jeram; SJK (C) Pei Chai
Simpang Jeram (N13)	Sri Tanjong	145/13/10	SK Bakri Batu 5
Simpang Jeram (N13)	Kampong Sungai Abong	145/13/11	Kolej Vokasional Muar; SK Sungai Abong

=== Representation history ===
Members of the Legislative Assembly for Bentayan
Assembly	No	Years	Member	Party
Constituency renamed from Maharani
11th	N12	2004–2008	Lau Yee Wee (劉有為)	BN (MCA)
12th	N12	2008–2013	Gwee Tong Hiang (魏宗賢)	PR (DAP)
13th	N12	2013–2018	Chua Wee Beng (蔡偉明)	PR (DAP)
14th	N12	2018–2022	Ng Yak Howe (黃益豪）	PH (DAP)
15th	N12	2022–2026	Ng Yak Howe (黃益豪）	PH (DAP)
16th	N12	2026-present	Ng Yak Howe (黃益豪）	PH (DAP)

== Election results ==
Johor state election, 2026: Bentayan
Party	Candidate	Votes	%	∆%
PH	Ng Yak Howe	13,917	64.07	▼0.46
BN	Chua Lee Huat	7,805	35.93	▲15.36
Total valid votes		21,722	100.00	
Total rejected ballots		219		
Unreturned ballots		22		
Turnout		21,963	64.21	▲14.30
Registered electors		34,205		
Majority		6,112	28.14	▼15.83
PH hold		Swing		

Johor state election, 2022: Bentayan
Party	Candidate	Votes	%	∆%
PH	Ng Yak Howe	10,973	64.53	▼15.19
BN	Gan Q'I Ru	3,497	20.57	▲0.29
PN	Eddy Tan Kok Hong	2,534	14.90	▲14.90
Total valid votes		17,004	100.00	
Total rejected ballots		239		
Unreturned ballots		91		
Turnout		17,334	49.91	▼33.50
Registered electors		34,728		
Majority		7,476	43.96	▼15.48
PH hold		Swing		

Johor state election, 2018: Bentayan
Party	Candidate	Votes	%	∆%
PKR	Ng Yak Howe	18,278	79.72	▲79.72
BN	Lee Kim Heng	4,649	20.28	▼12.27
Total valid votes		22,927	100.00	
Total rejected ballots		253		
Unreturned ballots		54		
Turnout		23,234	83.41	▼1.20
Registered electors		27,856		
Majority		13,629	59.44	▲24.54
PKR hold		Swing		

Johor state election, 2013: Bentayan
Party	Candidate	Votes	%	∆%
DAP	Chua Wee Beng	13,235	67.45	▲8.40
BN	Fong Soh Lan	6,388	32.55	▼8.40
Total valid votes		19,623	100.00	
Total rejected ballots		209		
Unreturned ballots		0		
Turnout		19,832	84.61	▲10.49
Registered electors		23,438		
Majority		6,847	34.90	▲16.80
DAP hold		Swing		
Source(s) "Federal Government Gazette – Notice of Contested Election, State Legislative Assembly for the State of Selangor [P.U. (B) 192/2013]" (PDF). Attorney General's Chambers of Malaysia. 26 April 2013. Archived from the original (PDF) on 29 December 2019. "Federal Government Gazette – Results of Contested Election and Statements of the Poll after the Official Addition of Votes, State Constituencies for the State of Selangor [P.U. (B) 233/2013]" (PDF). Attorney General's Chambers of Malaysia. 22 May 2013. Archived from the original (PDF) on 2 October 2018.

Johor state election, 2008: Bentayan
Party	Candidate	Votes	%	∆%
DAP	Wee Tong Hiang	9,118	59.05	▲10.49
BN	Lee Ching Yong	6,322	40.95	▼10.49
Total valid votes		15,440	100.00	
Total rejected ballots		277		
Unreturned ballots		20		
Turnout		15,737	74.12	▲2.15
Registered electors		21,233		
Majority		2,796	18.10	▲15.22
DAP gain from BN		Swing		?

Johor state election, 2004: Bentayan
Party	Candidate	Votes	%
BN	Lau Yee Wee	7,657	51.44
DAP	Tan Chen Choon	7,229	48.56
Total valid votes		14,886	100.00
Total rejected ballots		338	
Unreturned ballots		338	
Turnout		15,562	71.97
Registered electors		21,624	
Majority		428	2.88
This was a new constituency created.
