= Samsolbari Jamali =

Malaysian politician (born 1960)

Yang Berhormat Datuk Samsolbari Jamali DMSM KMN PIS MLA
- شمس البارئ جمالي

Deputy Speaker of the Johor State Legislative Assembly
- Incumbent
- Assumed office 21 April 2022
- Monarch: Ibrahim Iskandar
- Menteri Besar: Onn Hafiz Ghazi
- Speaker: Mohd Puad Zarkashi
- Preceded by: Gan Peck Cheng
- Constituency: Semarang

Member of the Johor State Executive Council (Agriculture, Agro-based Industry & Rural Development)
- In office 6 March 2020 – 15 March 2022
- Monarch: Ibrahim Iskandar
- Menteri Besar: Hasni Mohammad
- Preceded by: Tosrin Jarvanthi
- Succeeded by: Zahari Sarip
- Constituency: Semarang

Member of the Johor State Legislative Assembly for Semarang
- Incumbent
- Assumed office 21 March 2004
- Preceded by: Position established
- Majority: 7,826 (2004); 7,314 (2008); 8,075 (2013); 5,042 (2018); 5,846 (2022)

Faction represented in the Johor State Legislative Assembly
- 2004–: Barisan Nasional

Personal details
- Born: Samsolbari bin Jamali; 1 July 1960 (age 66) Batu Pahat, Johor, Federation of Malaya (now Malaysia)
- Citizenship: Malaysian
- Party: United Malays National Organisation (UMNO)
- Other political affiliations: Barisan Nasional (BN)
- Spouse: Mariam Dazdut Gulat Khan
- Children: 4
- Education: Universiti Teknologi MARA
- Occupation: Politician

Datuk Samsolbari bin Jamali (born 1 July 1960) is a Malaysian politician who has served as Deputy Speaker of the Johor State Legislative Assembly since April 2022 and Member of Johor State Legislative Assembly (MLA) for Semarang since March 2004. He previously served as Member of the Johor State Executive Council (EXCO) in the Barisan Nasional (BN) state administration under former Menteri Besar Hasni Mohammad from March 2020 to March 2022. He is a member and the Division Chief of Ayer Hitam of the United Malays National Organisation (UMNO), a component party of the ruling BN coalition.

== Election results ==
Johor State Legislative Assembly
| Year | Constituency | Candidate | Votes | Pct | Opponent(s) | Votes | Pct | Ballots cast | Majority | Turnout |
|---|---|---|---|---|---|---|---|---|---|---|
| 2004 | N20 Semarang | Samsolbari Jamali (UMNO) | 9,937 | 82.48% | Husin Sujak (PAS) | 2,111 | 17.52% | 12,351 | 7,826 | 78.62% |
| 2008 | N20 Semarang | Samsolbari Jamali (UMNO) | 10,180 | 78.03% | Alliar @ Ilyas A. Bakar (PAS) | 2,866 | 21.97% | 13,354 | 7,314 | 81.05% |
| 2013 | N20 Semarang | Samsolbari Jamali (UMNO) | 12,981 | 72.57% | Alliar @ Ilyas A. Bakar (PAS) | 4,906 | 27.43% | 18,210 | 8,075 | 89.14% |
| 2018 | N20 Semarang | Samsolbari Jamali (UMNO) | 10,751 | 59.45% | Zais Mohd Akil (BERSATU) | 4,909 | 27.15% | 18,372 | 5,842 | 86.40% |
| 2018 | N20 Semarang | Samsolbari Jamali (UMNO) | 10,751 | 59.45% | Mohd Bakri Samian (PAS) | 2,423 | 13.40% | 18,372 | 5,842 | 86.40% |
| 2022 | N20 Semarang | Samsolbari Jamali (UMNO) | 11,122 | 63.21% | Shazani A. Hamid (BERSATU) | 5,276 | 29.98% | 17,959 | 5,846 | 64.75% |
| 2022 | N20 Semarang | Samsolbari Jamali (UMNO) | 11,122 | 63.21% | Abu Nasir (PKR) | 1,331 | 7.56% | 17,959 | 5,846 | 64.75% |
| 2022 | N20 Semarang | Samsolbari Jamali (UMNO) | 11,122 | 63.21% | Adzlan Raju (PEJUANG) | 230 | 1.31% | 17,959 | 5,846 | 64.75% |
| 2026 | N20 Semarang | Samsolbari Jamali (UMNO) | 17,374 | 78.00% | Ramli Abd Hamid (AMANAH) | 2,205 | 9.90% | 22,516 | 14,679 | 78.31% |
| 2026 | N20 Semarang | Samsolbari Jamali (UMNO) | 17,374 | 78.00% | Mohd Syafiq Aziz (BERSATU) | 2,695 | 12.10% | 22,516 | 14,679 | 78.31% |

== Honours ==
=== Honours of Malaysia ===
- Malaysia
  - Officer of the Order of the Defender of the Realm (KMN) (2005)
- Malacca
  - Companion Class I of the Order of Malacca (DMSM) – Datuk (2006)
- Johor
  - Recipient of the Sultan Ibrahim Medal (PIS)
