= Zulkurnain Kamisan =

Malaysian politician

Yang Berhormat Dato' Zulkurnain Kamisan DIMP MLA
- ذوالقرنين خميسً

Johor State Executive Councillor for Youth, Sports, Culture and Heritage
- In office 14 May 2013 – 12 May 2018
- Monarch: Ibrahim
- Menteri Besar: Mohamed Khaled Nordin
- Preceded by: Md Jais Sarday (Youth and Sports); Asiah Md Ariff (Culture and Heritage)
- Succeeded by: Mohd Khuzzan Abu Bakar
- Constituency: Sri Medan

Member of the Johor State Legislative Assembly for Sri Medan
- Incumbent
- Assumed office 5 May 2013
- Preceded by: Ahmad Zahri Jamil (UMNO–BN)
- Majority: 9,430 (2013); 6,040 (2018); 6,274 (2022)

Personal details
- Born: Johor, Malaysia
- Citizenship: Malaysian
- Party: United Malays National Organisation (UMNO)
- Other political affiliations: Barisan Nasional (BN)
- Parent: Kamisan Ashari (father)
- Occupation: Politician

Zulkurnain bin Kamisan is a Malaysian politician. He is the Member of Johor State Legislative Assembly for Sri Medan since 2013 and had served as Johor State Executive Councillor under Menteri Besar Mohamed Khaled Nordin. He is a member and the Division Chief of Parit Sulong of the United Malays National Organisation (UMNO), a component party of the Barisan Nasional (BN) coalition.

== Election results ==
Johor State Legislative Assembly
Year	Constituency		Votes	Pct	Opponent(s)	Votes	Pct	Ballots cast	Majority	Turnout
2013	N18 Sri Medan	Zulkurnain Kamisan (UMNO)	16,034	70.83%	Ahmad Rosdi Bahari (PAS)	6,604	29.17%	23,112	9,430	89.60%
2018	N18 Sri Medan	Zulkurnain Kamisan (UMNO)	11,587	56.88%	Mohd Ajib Omar (BERSATU)	5,547	27.23%	20,811	6,040	86.50%
2018	N18 Sri Medan	Zulkurnain Kamisan (UMNO)	11,587	56.88%	Sallehudin Ab. Rasid (PAS)	3,238	15.89%	20,811	6,040	86.50%
2022	N18 Sri Medan	Zulkurnain Kamisan (UMNO)	13,165	60.52%	Halim Othman Kepol (PAS)	6,891	31.68%	21,752	6,274	66.53%
2022	N18 Sri Medan	Zulkurnain Kamisan (UMNO)	13,165	60.52%	Azmi Masrani (PKR)	1,537	7.07%	21,752	6,274	66.53%
2022	N18 Sri Medan	Zulkurnain Kamisan (UMNO)	13,165	60.52%	Mohd Firdaus Abdul Malek (PEJUANG)	159	0.73%	21,752	6,274	66.53%
2026	N18 Sri Medan	Zulkurnain Kamisan (UMNO)	20,090	75.55%	Hishamuddin Misrin Ishak (PKR)	2,224	8.36%	26,869	15,814	79.32%
2026	N18 Sri Medan	Zulkurnain Kamisan (UMNO)	20,090	75.55%	Ahmad Rosdi Bahari (PAS)	4,276	16.08%	26,869	15,814	79.32%
