= Mohd Jafni Md Shukor =

Malaysian politician (born 1972)

Yang Berhormat Dato' Mohd Jafni Md Shukor DIMP MLA
- محمّد جفني مد شکور

Member of the Johor State Executive Council (Housing and Local Government)
- Incumbent
- Assumed office 26 March 2022
- Monarch: Ibrahim
- Menteri Besar: Onn Hafiz Ghazi
- Preceded by: Ayub Jamil
- Constituency: Bukit Permai

Member of the Johor State Legislative Assembly for Bukit Permai
- Incumbent
- Assumed office 12 March 2022
- Preceded by: Tosrin Jarvanthi (PH–BERSATU)
- Majority: 4,755 (2022)

Faction represented in Johor State Legislative Assembly
- 2022–: Barisan Nasional

Personal details
- Born: Mohd Jafni bin Md Shukor; 28 January 1972 (age 54) Malaysia
- Citizenship: Malaysian
- Party: United Malays National Organisation (UMNO)
- Other political affiliations: Barisan Nasional (BN)
- Occupation: Politician

Mohd Jafni bin Md Shukor (born 28 January 1972) is a Malaysian politician who has served as Member of the Johor State Executive Council (EXCO) in the Barisan Nasional (BN) state administration under Menteri Besar Onn Hafiz Ghazi and Member of the Johor State Legislative Assembly (MLA) for Bukit Permai since March 2022. He is a member and the Division Chief of Kulai of the United Malays National Organisation (UMNO), a component party of the BN coalition.

== Election results ==
Johor State Legislative Assembly
Year	Constituency	Candidate	Votes	Pct	Opponent(s)	Votes	Pct	Ballots cast	Majority	Turnout
2022	N50 Bukit Permai	Mohd Jafni Md Shukor (UMNO)	10,889	48.36%	Azrol Rahani (MUDA)	6,134	27.24%	23,088	4,755	58.29%
2022	N50 Bukit Permai	Mohd Jafni Md Shukor (UMNO)	10,889	48.36%	Tosrin Jarvanthi (BERSATU)	5,108	22.69%	23,088	4,755	58.29%
2022	N50 Bukit Permai	Mohd Jafni Md Shukor (UMNO)	10,889	48.36%	Mokhtar Abdul Wahab (PEJUANG)	385	1.71%	23,088	4,755	58.29%

== Honours ==
- Pahang
  - Knight Companion of the Order of the Crown of Pahang (DIMP) – Dato' (2014)
