= Layang-Layang (state constituency) =

Political subdivision in Malaysia

Layang-Layang (N27)
Johor constituency

State constituency
- Legislature: Johor State Legislative Assembly
MLA
Chua Jian Boon
BN
- Constituency created: 1973
- Constituency abolished: 1986
- Constituency re-created: 2003
- First contested: 1974
- Last contested: 2026

Demographics
- Population (2020): 29,479
- Electors (2026): 25,181
- Area (km²): 375

Layang-Layang is a state constituency in Johor, Malaysia, that is represented in the Johor State Legislative Assembly.

The state constituency was first contested in 2004 and is mandated to return a single Assemblyman to the Johor State Legislative Assembly under the first-past-the-post voting system.

== Demographics ==
As of 2026, Layang-Layang has a population of 29,479 people.

Ethnic breakdown of Layang-Layang's electorate as of 2026
1. Malay (56.9%)
2. Chinese (28.3%)
3. Indian (12.4%)
4. Other ethnicities (2.50%)

== History ==
=== Polling districts ===
According to the federal gazette issued on 2 July 2026, the Layang-Layang constituency has a total of 14 polling districts.

State constituency	Polling District	Code	Location
Layang-Layang (N27)	Ladang Tun Dr. Ismail	151/27/01	SK Ladang Tun Dr. Ismail
Layang-Layang (N27)	Kampong Chokro	151/27/02	SA Kompleks Penghulu Simpang Renggam
Layang-Layang (N27)	Kampong Sahari	151/27/03	SR Islam As Syddiq
Layang-Layang (N27)	Senda	151/27/04	SMK Dato' Hj. Hassan Yunos
Layang-Layang (N27)	Bandar Renggam	151/27/05	SJK (C) Chin Chiang
Layang-Layang (N27)	Kebun Bahru	151/27/06	SK Jubli Intan
Layang-Layang (N27)	Sembrong	151/27/07	SJK (T) Ladang Sembrong
Layang-Layang (N27)	Chemara	151/27/08	SJK (T) Ulu Remis
Layang-Layang (N27)	Layang-Layang	151/27/09	SA Pekan Layang-Layang
Layang-Layang (N27)	Bandar Layang-Layang Selatan	151/27/10	SJK (C) Layang-Layang; SK Pekan Layang-Layang
Layang-Layang (N27)	Bandar Layang-Layang Utara	151/27/11	SJK (C) Layang
Layang-Layang (N27)	Renggam	151/27/12	SK Seri Kg. Renggam
Layang-Layang (N27)	Ladang Southern Malay	151/27/13	SJK (T) Ladang Southern Malay
Layang-Layang (N27)	FELDA Layang-Layang	151/27/14	SK (Felda) Layang-Layang

=== Representation history ===
Members of the Legislative Assembly for Layang-Layang
Assembly	No	Years	Member	Party
Constituency created from Renggam, Gunong Lambak and Senai-Kulai
4th	N17	1974–1978	Law Lai Heng (吴来兴)	BN (MCA)
5th	N17	1978–1982	Law Boon King @ Low Boon Hong (刘文丰)	BN (MCA)
6th	N17	1982–1986	Law Boon King @ Low Boon Hong (刘文丰)	BN (MCA)
Constituency abolished, split into Gunong Lambak, Bandar Tenggara, Simpang Renggam and Kulai
Constituency recreated from Simpang Renggam
11th	N27	2004–2008	Onn Mohd Yassin	BN (UMNO)
12th	N27	2008–2013	Onn Mohd Yassin	BN (UMNO)
13th	N27	2013–2018	Abd Mutalip Abd Rahim	BN (UMNO)
14th	N27	2018–2022	Onn Hafiz Ghazi	BN (UMNO)
15th	N27	2022–2026	Abd Mutalip Abd Rahim	BN (UMNO)
16th	N27	2026-present	Chua Jian Boon (蔡建文）	BN (MCA)

== Election results ==
Johor state election, 2026
Party	Candidate	Votes	%	∆%
BN	Chua Jian Boon	11,579	67.17	▲12.17
PH	Guna Balakrishnan	3,667	21.27	▲21.27
PN	Abd Mutalip Abd Rahim	1,993	11.56	▲2.25
Total valid votes		17,239	100.00	
Total rejected ballots		219		
Unreturned ballots		21		
Turnout		17,479	69.41	▲13.02
Registered electors		25,181		
Majority		7,912	45.90	▲25.39
BN hold		Swing		

Johor state election, 2022
Party	Candidate	Votes	%	∆%
BN	Abd Mutalip Abd Rahim	7,551	55.00	▲8.07
PKR	Maszlee Malik	4,736	34.50	▼10.14
PN	Alagenthiran Krishnan	1,278	9.31	▲9.31
PEJUANG	Ahmad Shafiq Othaman	164	1.91	▲1.91
Total valid votes		13,729	100.00	
Total rejected ballots		381		
Unreturned ballots		71		
Turnout		14,181	56.39	▼25.54
Registered electors		25,147		
Majority		2,815	20.50	▲18.21
BN hold		Swing		

Johor state election, 2018
Party	Candidate	Votes	%	∆%
BN	Onn Hafiz Ghazi	7,449	46.93	▼11.63
PKR	Murugan Muthu Samy	7,085	44.64	▲3.20
PAS	Mohd Jubri Selamat	1,339	8.44	▲8.44
Total valid votes		15,873	100.00	
Total rejected ballots		336		
Unreturned ballots		48		
Turnout		16,257	81.93	▼2.65
Registered electors		19,842		
Majority		364	2.29	▼14.83
BN hold		Swing		

Johor state election, 2013
Party	Candidate	Votes	%	∆%
BN	Abd Mutalip Abd Rahim	8,613	58.56	▼1.98
PKR	Mohd Ishak Shir Mohd	6,095	41.44	▲1.98
Total valid votes		14,708	100.00	
Total rejected ballots		390		
Unreturned ballots		60		
Turnout		15,158	84.58	▲12.47
Registered electors		17,922		
Majority		2,518	17.12	▼3.95
BN hold		Swing		

Johor state election, 2008
Party	Candidate	Votes	%	∆%
BN	Onn Mohd Yassin	7,015	60.54	▼22.87
PKR	Yap Weng Keong	4,573	39.46	▲22.87
Total valid votes		11,588	100.00	
Total rejected ballots		375		
Unreturned ballots		18		
Turnout		11,981	72.11	▲1.61
Registered electors		16,615		
Majority		2,442	21.07	▼45.73
BN hold		Swing		

Johor state election, 2004
Party	Candidate	Votes	%	∆%
BN	Onn Mohd Yassin	9,467	83.40	
PKR	Rama Loo Kannaiah	1,884	16.60	
Total valid votes		11,351	100.00	
Total rejected ballots		439		
Unreturned ballots		110		
Turnout		11,900	70.50	
Registered electors		16,880		
Majority		7,583	66.80	
BN hold		Swing		

Johor state election, 1982
Party	Candidate	Votes	%	∆%
BN	Jimmy Low Boon Hong	14,102	71.29	▲0.55
DAP	Chai Sek Yong	5,680	28.71	▼0.55
Total valid votes		19,782	100.00	
Total rejected ballots		888		
Unreturned ballots		0		
Turnout		20,670	77.54	▲1.10
Registered electors		26,657		
Majority		8,422	42.57	▲1.10
BN hold		Swing		

Johor state election, 1978
Party	Candidate	Votes	%	∆%
BN	Jimmy Low Boon Hong	11,861	70.74	
DAP	Chin Kim Chong	4,907	29.26	
Total valid votes		16,768	100.00	
Total rejected ballots		1,113		
Unreturned ballots		0		
Turnout		17,881	79.25	
Registered electors		22,563		
Majority		6,954	41.47	
BN hold		Swing		

Johor state election, 1974
Party	Candidate	Votes	%
On the nomination day, Law Lai Heng won uncontested.
BN	Law Lai Heng		
Total valid votes			
Total rejected ballots			
Unreturned ballots			
Turnout			
Registered electors		18,426	
Majority			
This was a new constituency created.
