= Johor Jaya (state constituency) =

Political subdivision in Malaysia

Johor Jaya (N42)
Johor constituency

State constituency
- Legislature: Johor State Legislative Assembly
MLA
Chan San San
BN
- Constituency created: 2003
- First contested: 2004
- Last contested: 2026

Demographics
- Population (2020): 152,873
- Electors (2026): 97,685
- Area (km²): 76

Johor Jaya is a state constituency in Johor, Malaysia, that is represented in the Johor State Legislative Assembly.

The state constituency was first contested in 2004 and is mandated to return a single Assemblyman to the Johor State Legislative Assembly under the first-past-the-post voting system.

== Demographics ==
As of 2020, Johor Jaya has a population of 152,873 people.

Ethnic breakdown of Johor Jaya's electorate as of 2026
1. Chinese (45.5%)
2. Malay (40.1%)
3. Indian (7.80%)
4. Other ethnicities (6.60%)

== History ==
=== Polling districts ===
According to the gazette issued on 2 July 2026, the Johor Jaya constituency has a total of 19 polling districts.

State constituency	Polling districts	Code	Location
Johor Jaya（N42）	Pandan	159/42/01	SA Kg Melayu Pandan
Johor Jaya（N42）	Taman Molek	159/42/02	SK Taman Molek
Johor Jaya（N42）	Johor Jaya Barat	159/42/03	SK Taman Johor Jaya 1; SMA Johor Bahru
Johor Jaya（N42）	Johor Jaya Selatan	159/42/04	SJK (C) Johor Jaya
Johor Jaya（N42）	Johor Jaya Timor	159/42/05	SMK Taman Johor Jaya (1)
Johor Jaya（N42）	Johor Jaya Tengah	159/42/06	SA Taman Johor Jaya
Johor Jaya（N42）	Johor Jaya Utara	159/42/07	SMK Taman Johor Jaya 2; SK Taman Johor Jaya 5
Johor Jaya（N42）	Bandar Plentong Utara	159/42/08	SJK (C) Chien Chi
Johor Jaya（N42）	Bandar Plentong Selatan	159/42/09	SA Tun Hussein Onn Plentong; SJK (C) Chien Chi; Dewan Raya Plentong
Johor Jaya（N42）	Taman Saujana	159/42/10	SA Taman Molek
Johor Jaya（N42）	Plentong	159/42/11	Dewan Raya Plentong; SJK (C) Chien Chi
Johor Jaya（N42）	Masai	159/42/12	SMK Dato' Penggawa Timur; SK Seri Alam 2
Johor Jaya（N42）	Teratai	159/42/13	SK Taman Johor Jaya 3
Johor Jaya（N42）	Keembong	159/42/14	SK Taman Johor Jaya 2
Johor Jaya（N42）	Seri Alam	159/42/15	Dewan Raya Bandar Seri Alam
Johor Jaya（N42）	Molek Harmoni	159/42/16	SMK Taman Molek
Johor Jaya（N42）	Tasek Seri Alam	159/42/17	SMK Bandar Seri Alam; SA Bandar Seri Alam
Johor Jaya（N42）	Belantik	159/42/18	SK Sri Amar
Johor Jaya（N42）	Sri Amar	159/42/19	Dewan Badminton Sri Amar

=== Representation history ===
Members of the Legislative Assembly for Johor Jaya
Assembly	No	Years	Member	Party
Constituency split from Pasir Gudang, Tiram and Tanjong Puteri
11th	N42	2004–2008	Tan Cher Puk (陈书北)	BN (MCA)
12th	N42	2008–2013	Tan Cher Puk (陈书北)	BN (MCA)
13th	N42	2013–2018	Liow Cai Tung (廖彩彤)	PR (DAP)
14th	N42	2018–2022	Liow Cai Tung (廖彩彤)	PH (DAP)
15th	N42	2022–2026	Liow Cai Tung (廖彩彤)	PH (DAP)
16th	N42	2026-present	Chan San San (陈珊珊)	BN (MCA)

== Election results ==
Johor state election, 2026
Party	Candidate	Votes	%	∆%
BN	Chan San San	35,971	53.75	▲16.07
PH	Lee Wern Ying	28,703	42.89	▲1.15
BERSAMA	Lau Yi Leong	2,051	3.06	▲3.06
Independent	Lim Hun Peaw	195	0.29	▲0.29
Total valid votes		66,920	100.00	
Total rejected ballots		715		
Unreturned ballots		41		
Turnout		67,676	69.28	▲16.06
Registered electors		97,685		
Majority		7,268	10.86	▲6.81
BN gain from PH		Swing		?

Johor state election, 2022
Party	Candidate	Votes	%	∆%
PH	Liow Cai Tung	19,782	41.74	▲41.74
BN	Chan San San	17,860	37.68	▲5.24
PN	Ker Ching Sheng	8,307	17.53	▲17.53
Heritage	Victor Chen Hain Kai	1,448	3.06	▲3.06
Total valid votes		47,397	100.00	
Total rejected ballots		1,262		
Unreturned ballots		243		
Turnout		48,902	53.22	▼32.97
Registered electors		91,882		
Majority		1,922	4.06	▼26.03
PH hold		Swing		

Johor state election, 2018
Party	Candidate	Votes	%	∆%
PKR	Liow Cai Tung	32,342	62.53	▲62.53
BN	Tan Cher Puk	16,777	32.44	▼15.72
PAS	Kumutha Rahman	2,605	5.04	▲5.04
Total valid votes		51,724	100.00	
Total rejected ballots		699		
Unreturned ballots		222		
Turnout		52,645	86.19	▼2.03
Registered electors		61,079		
Majority		15,565	30.09	▲26.81
PKR hold		Swing		?

Johor state election, 2013
Party	Candidate	Votes	%	∆%
DAP	Liow Cai Tung	22,879	51.44	▲51.44
BN	Tan Cher Puk	21,419	48.16	▼20.18
Independent	Hong Eng Wah	177	0.40	▲0.40
Total valid votes		44,475	100.00	
Total rejected ballots		1,087		
Unreturned ballots		0		
Turnout		45,562	88.22	▲10.88
Registered electors		51,648		
Majority		1,460	3.28	▼38.40
DAP gain from BN		Swing		?

Johor state election, 2008
Party	Candidate	Votes	%	∆%
BN	Tan Cher Puk	19,538	68.34	▼9.51
Parti Rakyat Malaysia	Md Nashir Wahab	9,050	31.66	▲31.66
Total valid votes		28,588	100.00	
Total rejected ballots		713		
Unreturned ballots		216		
Turnout		29,517	77.34	▲1.27
Registered electors		38,167		
Majority		10,488	36.68	▼26.00
BN hold		Swing		

Johor state election, 2004
Party	Candidate	Votes	%
BN	Tan Cher Puk	19,121	77.85
DAP	Sey Jock	3,726	15.17
PKR	Low Ching Kuang	1,714	6.98
Total valid votes		24,561	100.00
Total rejected ballots		626	
Unreturned ballots		144	
Turnout		25,331	76.07
Registered electors		33,299	
Majority		15,395	62.68
This was a new constituency created.
