= Semarang (state constituency) =

Malaysian administrative division

Semarang (N20)
Johor constituency

State constituency
- Legislature: Johor State Legislative Assembly
MLA
Samsolbari Jamali
BN
- Constituency created: 2003
- First contested: 2004
- Last contested: 2026

Demographics
- Population (2020): 29,695
- Electors (2026): 28,753
- Area (km²): 192

Semarang is a state constituency in Johor, Malaysia, that is represented in the Johor State Legislative Assembly.

The state constituency was first contested in 2004 and is mandated to return a single Assemblyman to the Johor State Legislative Assembly under the first-past-the-post voting system.

== Demographics ==
As of 2020, Semarang has a population of 29,695 people.

Ethnic breakdown of Semarang's electorate as of 2022
1. Malay (86.3%)
2. Chinese (12.0%)
3. Other ethnicities (0.90%)
4. Indian (0.70%)

== History ==
=== Polling districts ===
According to the gazette issued on 2 July 2026, the Semarang constituency has a total of 13 polling districts.

| State constituency | Polling Districts | Code | Location |
|---|---|---|---|
| Semarang (N20) | Parit Haji Yusof | 148/20/01 | SK Seri Tengah; SK Seri Mendapat |
| Semarang (N20) | Sri Mendapat | 148/20/02 | SK Seri Mendapat |
| Semarang (N20) | Kampong Haji Ghaffar | 148/20/03 | SK Seri Bulan |
| Semarang (N20) | Asam Bubok | 148/20/04 | SK Seri Bandan |
| Semarang (N20) | Sungai Rambot | 148/20/05 | SK Seri Manggis |
| Semarang (N20) | Ayer Hitam Selatan | 148/20/06 | SK Kota Dalam |
| Semarang (N20) | Ayer Hitam Utara | 148/20/07 | SK Ayer Hitam |
| Semarang (N20) | Bandar Ayer Hitam Barat | 148/20/08 | SMK Datuk Menteri |
| Semarang (N20) | Bandar Ayer Hitam Timor | 148/20/09 | SJK (C) Malayan |
| Semarang (N20) | Parit Semarang | 148/20/10 | SMK Suria Perdana |
| Semarang (N20) | Parit Quarry | 148/20/11 | SK Bukit Kuari |
| Semarang (N20) | Sabak Uni | 148/20/12 | SK Seri Sabak Uni |
| Semarang (N20) | Parit Haji Ali | 148/20/13 | SK Setia Jaya |
| Semarang (N20) | Parit Simpang Tengah | 148/20/14 | SK Seri Kemajuan |

=== Representation history ===
Members of the Legislative Assembly for Semarang
| Assembly | No | Years | Member | Party |
Constituency created from Parit Yaani and Parit Raja
| 11th | N20 | 2004–2008 | Samsolbari Jamali | BN (UMNO) |
| 12th | N20 | 2008–2013 | Samsolbari Jamali | BN (UMNO) |
| 13th | N20 | 2013–2018 | Samsolbari Jamali | BN (UMNO) |
| 14th | N20 | 2018–2022 | Samsolbari Jamali | BN (UMNO) |
| 15th | N20 | 2022–2026 | Samsolbari Jamali | BN (UMNO) |
| 16th | N20 | 2026–present | Samsolbari Jamali | BN (UMNO) |

== Election results ==
Johor state election, 2026
| Party | Candidate | Votes | % | ∆% |
|---|---|---|---|---|
| BN | Samsolbari Jamali | 17,374 | 78.00 | ▲14.79 |
| PN | Mohd Syafiq Aziz | 2,695 | 12.10 | ▼17.88 |
| PH | Ramli Abd Hamid | 2,205 | 9.90 | ▲2.34 |
| Total valid votes | | 22,274 | 100.00 | |
| Total rejected ballots | | 206 | | |
| Unreturned ballots | | 36 | | |
| Turnout | | 22,516 | 78.31 | ▲11.56 |
| Registered electors | | 28,753 | | |
| Majority | | 14,679 | 65.90 | ▲33.35 |
| BN hold | | Swing | | |

Johor state election, 2022
| Party | Candidate | Votes | % | ∆% |
|---|---|---|---|---|
| BN | Samsolbari Jamali | 11,122 | 63.21 | ▲2.51 |
| PN | Shazani A Hamid | 5,276 | 29.98 | ▲29.98 |
| PH | Haryati Abu Nasir | 1,331 | 7.56 | ▲7.56 |
| PEJUANG | Adzlan Raju | 230 | 1.31 | ▲1.31 |
| Total valid votes | | 17,959 | 100.00 | |
| Total rejected ballots | | 330 | | |
| Unreturned ballots | | 224 | | |
| Turnout | | 18,513 | 66.75 | ▼19.69 |
| Registered electors | | 27,734 | | |
| Majority | | 5,846 | 32.55 | ▲0.25 |
| BN hold | | Swing | | |

Johor state election, 2018
| Party | Candidate | Votes | % | ∆% |
|---|---|---|---|---|
| BN | Samsolbari Jamali | 10,751 | 59.45 | ▼13.12 |
| PKR | Zais Mohd Akil | 4,909 | 27.15 | ▲27.15 |
| PAS | Mohd Bakri Samian | 2,423 | 13.40 | ▼14.03 |
| Total valid votes | | 18,083 | 100.00 | |
| Total rejected ballots | | 242 | | |
| Unreturned ballots | | 47 | | |
| Turnout | | 18,372 | 86.44 | ▼2.91 |
| Registered electors | | 21,254 | | |
| Majority | | 5,842 | 32.31 | ▼12.84 |
| BN hold | | Swing | | |

Johor state election, 2013
| Party | Candidate | Votes | % | ∆% |
|---|---|---|---|---|
| BN | Samsolbari Jamali | 12,981 | 72.57 | ▼5.46 |
| PAS | Ilyas Abu Bakar | 4,906 | 27.43 | ▲5.46 |
| Total valid votes | | 17,887 | 100.00 | |
| Total rejected ballots | | 320 | | |
| Unreturned ballots | | 47 | | |
| Turnout | | 18,254 | 89.35 | ▲8.31 |
| Registered electors | | 20,429 | | |
| Majority | | 8,075 | 45.14 | ▼10.92 |
| BN hold | | Swing | | |

Johor state election, 2008
| Party | Candidate | Votes | % | ∆% |
|---|---|---|---|---|
| BN | Samsolbari Jamali | 10,180 | 78.03 | ▼4.45 |
| PAS | Ilyas Abu Bakar | 2,866 | 21.97 | ▲4.45 |
| Total valid votes | | 13,046 | 100.00 | |
| Total rejected ballots | | 287 | | |
| Unreturned ballots | | 21 | | |
| Turnout | | 13,354 | 81.05 | ▲2.43 |
| Registered electors | | 16,477 | | |
| Majority | | 7,314 | 56.06 | ▼8.89 |
| BN hold | | Swing | | |

Johor state election, 2004
| Party | Candidate | Votes | % |
|---|---|---|---|
| BN | Samsolbari Jamali | 9,937 | 82.48 |
| PAS | Husin Sujak | 2,111 | 17.52 |
| Total valid votes | | 12,048 | 100.00 |
| Total rejected ballots | | 303 | |
| Unreturned ballots | | 0 | |
| Turnout | | 12,351 | 78.62 |
| Registered electors | | 15,710 | |
| Majority | | 7,826 | 64.96 |
This was a new constituency created.
