= Sri Medan (state constituency) =

State constituency in Johor, Malaysia

Sri Medan (N18)
Johor constituency

State constituency
- Legislature: Johor State Legislative Assembly
MLA
Zulkurnain Kamisan
BN
- Constituency created: 1974
- First contested: 1974
- Last contested: 2026

Demographics
- Population (2020): 36,145
- Electors (2026): 33,875
- Area (km²): 303

Sri Medan is a state constituency in Johor, Malaysia, that is represented in the Johor State Legislative Assembly.

The state constituency was first contested in 1974 and is mandated to return a single Assemblyman to the Johor State Legislative Assembly under the first-past-the-post voting system.

== Demographics ==
As of 2020, Sri Medan has a population of 36,145 people.

Ethnic breakdown of Sri Medan's electorate as of 2026
1. Malay (90.0%)
2. Chinese (8.10%)
3. Other ethnicities (1.50%)
4. Indian (0.30%)

== History ==
=== Polling districts ===
According to the gazette issued on 2 July 2026, the Sri Medan constituency has a total of 17 polling districts.

State constituency	Polling Districts	Code	Location
Sri Medan（N18）	Parit Gantong	147/18/01	SK Seri Tiga Serangkai
Sri Medan（N18）	Parit Jayos	147/18/02	SK Sejagong
Sri Medan（N18）	Parit Dayong	147/18/03	SK Seri Dayong
Sri Medan（N18）	Kampong Sri Pasir	147/18/04	SK Seri Pasir
Sri Medan（N18）	Sri Medan Barat	147/18/05	SK Seri Sejati
Sri Medan（N18）	Parit Warijo	147/18/06	Dewan Orang Ramai Seri Medan
Sri Medan（N18）	Parit Karjan	147/18/07	SK Sri Permatang Rengas
Sri Medan（N18）	Parit Sulong	147/18/08	SMK Dato Sulaiman
Sri Medan（N18）	Bandar Parit Sulong	147/18/09	SK Parit Sulong
Sri Medan（N18）	Sentang Batu	147/18/10	SK Seri Chantek
Sri Medan（N18）	Parit Othman	147/18/11	SK Seri Maimon
Sri Medan（N18）	Parit Haji Siraj	147/18/12	SA Kampung Jawa
Sri Medan（N18）	Parit Betong	147/18/13	SA Seri Chomel
Sri Medan（N18）	Parit Abdul Rahman	147/18/14	SK Seri Chomel
Sri Medan（N18）	Bandar Sri Medan	147/18/15	SK Seri Medan
Sri Medan（N18）	Sri Medan Timor	147/18/16	SA Seri Medan
Sri Medan（N18）	Air Putih	147/18/17	SK Air Putih

=== Representation history ===
Members of the Legislative Assembly for Sri Medan
Assembly	No	Years	Member	Party
Constituency created from Tanjong Sembrong and Simpang Kiri
4th	N14	1974-1978	Kamisan Ashari	BN (UMNO)
5th	N14	1978-1982	Kamisan Ashari	BN (UMNO)
6th	N14	1982-1986	Kamisan Ashari	BN (UMNO)
7th	N13	1986-1990	Kamisan Ashari	BN (UMNO)
8th	N13	1990-1995	Atikah Abdullah	BN (UMNO)
9th	N13	1995-1999	Atikah Abdullah	BN (UMNO)
10th	N13	1999-2004	Ahmad Zahri Jamil	BN (UMNO)
11th	N18	2004-2008	Ahmad Zahri Jamil	BN (UMNO)
12th	N18	2008-2013	Ahmad Zahri Jamil	BN (UMNO)
13th	N18	2013-2018	Zulkurnain Kamisan	BN (UMNO)
14th	N18	2018-2022	Zulkurnain Kamisan	BN (UMNO)
15th	N18	2022–2026	Zulkurnain Kamisan	BN (UMNO)
16th	N18	2026–present	Zulkurnain Kamisan	BN (UMNO)

== Election results ==
Johor state election, 2026
Party	Candidate	Votes	%	∆%
BN	Zulkurnain Kamisan	20,090	75.55	▲15.03
PN	Ahmad Rosdi Bahari	4,276	16.08	▼15.60
PH	Hishamuddin Misrin Ishak	2,224	8.36	▲1.29
Total valid votes		26,590	100.00	
Total rejected ballots		229		
Unreturned ballots		50		
Turnout		26,869	79.32	▲11.29
Registered electors		33,875		
Majority		15,814	59.47	▲30.63
BN hold		Swing		

Johor state election, 2022
Party	Candidate	Votes	%	∆%
BN	Zulkurnain Kamisan	13,165	60.52	▲3.65
PN	Halim Othman Kepol	6,891	31.68	▲31.68
PH	Azmi Masrani	1,537	7.07	▲7.07
PEJUANG	Mohd Firdaus Abdul Malek	159	0.73	▲0.73
Total valid votes		21,752	100.00	
Total rejected ballots		350		
Unreturned ballots		139		
Turnout		22,241	68.02	
Registered electors		32,696		
Majority		6,274	28.84	
BN hold		Swing		

Johor state election, 2018
Party	Candidate	Votes	%	∆%
BN	Zulkurnain Kamisan	11,587	56.88	▼13.95
PKR	Mohd Ajib Omar	5,547	27.23	▲27.23
PAS	Sallehudin Ab. Rasid	3,238	15.89	▼13.28
Total valid votes		20,372	100.00	
Total rejected ballots		363		
Unreturned ballots		76		
Turnout		20,811	86.53	▼3.11
Registered electors		24,052		
Majority		6,040	29.65	▼12.01
BN hold		Swing		

Johor state election, 2013
Party	Candidate	Votes	%	∆%
BN	Zulkurnain Kamisan	16,034	70.83	▼1.27
PAS	Ahmad Rosdi Bahari	6,604	29.17	▲1.27
Total valid votes		22,638	100.00	
Total rejected ballots		474		
Unreturned ballots		59		
Turnout		23,171	89.64	▲7.47
Registered electors		25,850		
Majority		9,430	41.66	▼2.53
BN hold		Swing		

Johor state election, 2008
Party	Candidate	Votes	%	∆%
BN	Ahmad Zahri Jamil	12,488	72.09	▼1.80
PAS	Mearaj Fatoni	4,834	27.91	▲1.80
Total valid votes		17,322	100.00	
Total rejected ballots		466		
Unreturned ballots		19		
Turnout		17,807	82.17	▲2.49
Registered electors		21,671		
Majority		7,654	44.19	▼3.61
BN hold		Swing		

Johor state election, 2004
Party	Candidate	Votes	%	∆%
BN	Ahmad Zamri Jamil	12,055	73.90	▲2.29
PAS	Muhammad Sabri Omar	4,258	26.10	▼2.29
Total valid votes		16,313	100.00	
Total rejected ballots		434		
Unreturned ballots		22		
Turnout		16,769	79.68	▲4.71
Registered electors		21,046		
Majority		7,797	47.80	▲4.59
BN hold		Swing		

Johor state election, 1999
Party	Candidate	Votes	%	∆%
BN	Ahmad Zahri Jamil	15,867	71.61	▼6.51
PAS	Muhammad Sabri Omar	6,292	28.39	▲28.39
Total valid votes		22,159	100.00	
Total rejected ballots		797		
Unreturned ballots		14		
Turnout		22,970	74.97	▲0.11
Registered electors		30,638		
Majority		9,575	43.21	▼13.01
BN hold		Swing		

Johor state election, 1995
Party	Candidate	Votes	%	∆%
BN	Atkah binti Abdullah	15,987	78.11	▲18.60
PAS	Azmi Masrani	4,480	21.89	▼18.60
Total valid votes		20,467	100.00	
Total rejected ballots		885		
Unreturned ballots		189		
Turnout		21,541	74.87	▼0.57
Registered electors		28,773		
Majority		11,507	56.22	▲37.21
BN hold		Swing		

Johor state election, 1990
Party	Candidate	Votes	%	∆%
BN	Atkah binti Abdullah	10,997	59.51	▼19.37
PAS	Kusni Simoh	7,483	40.49	▲40.49
Total valid votes		18,480	100.00	
Total rejected ballots		1,277		
Unreturned ballots		25		
Turnout		19,782	75.44	▲3.80
Registered electors		26,223		
Majority		3,514	19.02	▼38.75
BN hold		Swing		

Johor state election, 1986
Party	Candidate	Votes	%	∆%
BN	Kamisan Ashari	12,898	78.88	
PAS	Ishak Mohtaram	3,453	21.12	
Total valid votes		16,351	100.00	
Total rejected ballots		540		
Unreturned ballots		0		
Turnout		16,891	71.64	▲71.64
Registered electors		23,579		
Majority		9,445	57.76	▲57.76
BN hold		Swing		

Johor state election, 1982
Party	Candidate	Votes	%	∆%
On the nomination day, Kamisan Ashari won uncontested.
BN	Kamisan Ashari			
Total valid votes				
Total rejected ballots				
Unreturned ballots				
Turnout				
Registered electors		18,745		
Majority				
BN hold		Swing		

Johor state election, 1978
Party	Candidate	Votes	%	∆%
BN	Kamisan Ashari	10,048	89.88	
PAS	Napiah Simul	1,131	10.12	
Total valid votes		11,179	100.00	
Total rejected ballots		721		
Unreturned ballots		0		
Turnout		11,900	77.48	▲77.48
Registered electors		15,358		
Majority		8,917	79.77	▲79.77
BN hold		Swing		

Johor state election, 1974
Party	Candidate	Votes	%
On the nomination day, Kamisan Ashari won uncontested.
BN	Kamisan Ashari		
Total valid votes			
Total rejected ballots			
Unreturned ballots			
Turnout			
Registered electors		13,264	
Majority			
This was a new constituency created.
