= Bukit Permai =

Political subdivision in Malaysia

Bukit Permai (N50)
Johor constituency

State constituency
- Legislature: Johor State Legislative Assembly
MLA
Mohd Jafni Md Shukor
BN
- Constituency created: 1994
- First contested: 1995
- Last contested: 2026

Demographics
- Population (2020): 77,377
- Electors (2026): 44,819
- Area (km²): 286

Bukit Permai is a state constituency in Johor, Malaysia, that has been represented in the Johor State Legislative Assembly.

The state constituency was first contested in 1995 and is mandated to return a single Assemblyman to the Johor State Legislative Assembly under the first-past-the-post voting system.

== Demographics ==
As of 2020, Bukit Permai has a population of 77,377 people.

Ethnic breakdown of Bukit Permai's electorate as of 2026
1. Malay (54.3%)
2. Chinese (30.7%)
3. Indian (13.0%)
4. Other ethnicities (1.90%)

== History ==
=== Polling districts ===
According to the gazette issued on 2 July 2026, the Bukit Permai constituency has a total of 12 polling districts.

State constituency	Polling District	Code	Location
Bukit Permai (N50)	Murni Jaya	163/50/01	SK Murni Jaya
Bukit Permai (N50)	Bukit Permai	163/50/02	SK LKTP Bukit Permai
Bukit Permai (N50)	Inas	163/50/03	SK LKTP Inas
Bukit Permai (N50)	Sedenak Utara	163/50/04	SK Sedenak
Bukit Permai (N50)	Sedenak Selatan	163/50/05	SJK (C) Sedenak
Bukit Permai (N50)	Ladang Fraser	163/50/06	Balai Raya Ladang Fraser
Bukit Permai (N50)	Pekan Sengkang	163/50/07	SJK (C) Sengkang
Bukit Permai (N50)	FELDA Taib Andak	163/50/08	SK Sinar Bahagia
Bukit Permai (N50)	Ladang Swee Lam	163/50/09	SMK Bandar Putra; SK Banadar Putra; SK Putra Utama
Bukit Permai (N50)	Ladang Kelan	163/50/10	SJK (T) Ladang Kelan
Bukit Permai (N50)	Bandar Kulai Utara	163/50/11	Dewan Serbaguna Taman Mewah; Taman Bimbingan Kanak Kanak KEMAS Taman Desa; Balai Serbaguna Taman Saga
Bukit Permai (N50)	Kampong Pertanian	163/50/12	Dewan Serbaguna Kampung Pertanian

=== Representation history ===
Members of the Legislative Assembly for Bukit Permai
Assembly	No	Years	Member	Party
Constituency created from Bandar Tenggara and Kulai
9th	N28	1995-1999	Adam Abdul Hamid	BN (UMNO)
10th	N28	1999-2004	Adam Abdul Hamid	BN (UMNO)
11th	N50	2004-2008	Zainal Abidin Jidin	BN (UMNO)
12th	N50	2008-2013	Kamaruzaman Ali	BN (UMNO)
13th	N50	2013-2018	Ali Mazat Salleh	BN (UMNO)
14th	N50	2018-2020	Tosrin Jarvanthi	PH (BERSATU)
14th	N50	2020-2022	Tosrin Jarvanthi	PN (BERSATU)
15th	N50	2022–2026	Mohd Jafni Md Shukor	BN (UMNO)
16th	N50	2026-present	Mohd Jafni Md Shukor	BN (UMNO)

== Election results ==
Johor state election, 2026: Bukit Permai
Party	Candidate	Votes	%	∆%
BN	Mohd Jafni Md Shukor	21,870	67.18	▲18.82
PH	Mohamad Shafwan Ani	9,149	28.11	▲28.11
BERSAMA	Mohd Aidil Riduan	792	2.43	▲2.43
PN	M Lina Manoh	741	2.28	▼20.40
Total valid votes		32,552	100.00	
Total rejected ballots		366		
Unreturned ballots		22		
Turnout		32,940	73.50	▲15.21
Registered electors		44,819		
Majority		12,721	39.08	▲17.96
BN hold		Swing		?

Johor state election, 2022: Bukit Permai
Party	Candidate	Votes	%	∆%
BN	Mohd Jafni Md Shukor	10,889	48.36	
MUDA	Azrol Ab. Rahani	6,134	27.24	▲27.24
PN	Tosrin Jarvanthi	5,108	22.69	▲22.69
PEJUANG	Mokhtar Abdul Wahab	385	1.71	▲1.71
Total valid votes		22,516	100.00	
Total rejected ballots		457		
Unreturned ballots		115		
Turnout		23,088	58.29	▼28.96
Registered electors		39,611		
Majority		4,755	21.12	▲8.98
BN gain from PKR		Swing		?

Johor state election, 2018: Bukit Permai
Party	Candidate	Votes	%	∆%
PKR	Tosrin Jarvanthi	10,998	52.73	▲52.73
BN	Ali Mazat Salleh	8,467	40.60	▼18.22
PAS	Abd Aziz Ja'afar	1,392	6.67	▼34.51
Total valid votes		20,857	100.00	
Total rejected ballots		278		
Unreturned ballots		43		
Turnout		21,178	87.24	▼2.84
Registered electors		24,275		
Majority		2,531	12.14	▼5.50
PKR gain from BN		Swing		-

Johor state election, 2013: Bukit Permai
Party	Candidate	Votes	%	∆%
BN	Ali Mazat Salleh	11,236	58.82	▼13.60
PAS	Mazlan Aliman	7,867	41.18	▲13.60
Total valid votes		19,103	100.00	
Total rejected ballots		327		
Unreturned ballots		44		
Turnout		19,474	90.08	▲8.56
Registered electors		21,619		
Majority		3,369	17.64	▼27.21
BN hold		Swing		

Johor state election, 2008: Bukit Permai
Party	Candidate	Votes	%	∆%
BN	Kamaruzaman Ali	8,385	72.42	▼14.63
PAS	Mohd Badzihar Mohd Basri	3,193	27.58	▲14.63
Total valid votes		11,578	100.00	
Total rejected ballots		479		
Unreturned ballots		59		
Turnout		12,116	81.52	▲3.97
Registered electors		14,863		
Majority		5,192	44.84	▼29.25
BN hold		Swing		

Johor state election, 2004: Bukit Permai
Party	Candidate	Votes	%	∆%
BN	Zainal Abidin Jidin	9,194	87.05	▲10.29
PAS	Md Faridz Mohd Salleh	1,368	12.95	▼10.29
Total valid votes		10,562	100.00	
Total rejected ballots		364		
Unreturned ballots		6		
Turnout		10,932	77.54	▲3.42
Registered electors		14,098		
Majority		7,826	74.10	▲20.58
BN hold		Swing		

Johor state election, 1999: Bukit Permai
Party	Candidate	Votes	%	∆%
BN	Adam Abdul Hamid	14,586	76.76	▼7.97
PAS	Mazlan Aliman	4,416	23.24	▲18.61
Total valid votes		19,002	100.00	
Total rejected ballots		839		
Unreturned ballots		8		
Turnout		19,849	74.12	▼1.06
Registered electors		26,779		
Majority		10,170	53.52	▼20.56
BN hold		Swing		

Johor state election, 1995: Bukit Permai
Party	Candidate	Votes	%
BN	Adam Abdul Hamid	15,094	84.73
S46	Mohd Rapiee Mohd Som	1,897	10.65
PAS	Mazlan Aliman	824	4.63
Total valid votes		17,815	100.00
Total rejected ballots		728	
Unreturned ballots		52	
Turnout		18,595	75.18
Registered electors		24,734	
Majority		13,197	74.08
This was a new constituency created.
