= Johor State Legislative Assembly =

Legislative branch of the Johor state government

Johor State Legislative Assembly Dewan Negeri Johor ديوان نݢري جوهر
- 16th Johor State Assembly
- Insignia of Johor State Legislative Assembly

Type
- Type: Unicameral

History
- Founded: 1959

Leadership
- Regent: Tunku Mahkota Ismail since 28 January 2024
- Speaker: Zahari Sarip, BN-UMNO since 27 August 2026
- Deputy Speaker: Samsolbari Jamali, BN-UMNO since 21 April 2022
- Menteri Besar: Onn Hafiz Ghazi, BN-UMNO since 15 March 2022
- Balancing Force Leader: Andrew Chen Kah Eng, PH-DAP since 11 December 2022
- Secretary: Mustafa Kamal Abdullah

Structure
- Seats: 56 + 0 Nominated Member (Maximum 61 Members); Quorum: 19; Simple majority: 29; Two-thirds majority: 38
- Political groups: (As of 11 July 2026); Government (48) BN (48): UMNO (36); MCA (8); MIC (4); Opposition (8); PH (8): DAP (6); PKR (1); AMANAH (1); Speaker; BN (1)
- Committees: 4: Public Accounts Committee; Rules of Proceedings Committee; Right and Privileges Committee; Committee of Selection

Elections
- Voting system: Plurality: First-past-the-post (56 single-member constituencies)
- Last election: 11 July 2026
- Next election: By 26 October 2031

Meeting place
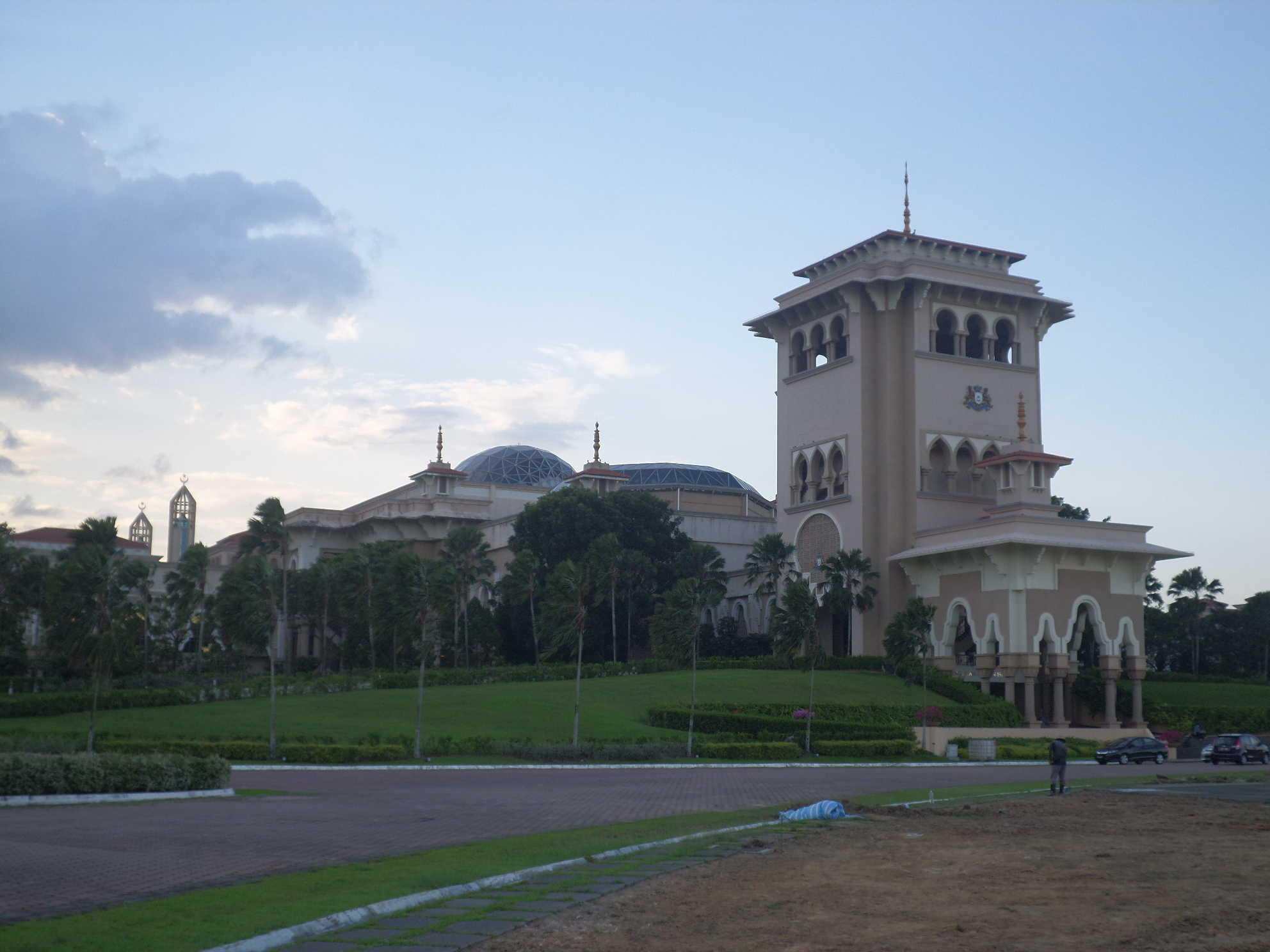
- Sultan Ismail Building, Kota Iskandar, Iskandar Puteri, Johor Bahru, Johor
- Sultan Ibrahim Building, Johor Bahru, Johor

Website
- dewannegeri.johor.gov.my

Constituencies of the Johor State Legislative Assembly

The Johor State Legislative Assembly (Malay: Dewan Negeri Johor) is the unicameral legislature of the Malaysian state of Johor. It is composed of 56 members who are elected from single-member constituencies throughout the state. Elections are held no more than five years apart. Prior to the 2022 state election, elections are always held concurrently with the federal parliament and other state assemblies elections.

The State Assembly convenes at Sultan Ismail Building in Kota Iskandar, Iskandar Puteri, Johor Bahru.

== Current composition ==
Government			Opposition
BN			PH
48			8
36	8	4	6	1	1
UMNO	MCA	MIC	DAP	PKR	AMANAH

No.	Parliamentary Constituency	No.	State Constituency	Member	Coalition (Party)	Post
P140	Segamat	N01	Buloh Kasap	Zahari Sarip	BN (UMNO)	Speaker
P140	Segamat	N02	Jementah	See Ann Giap	BN (MCA)	N/A
P141	Sekijang	N03	Pemanis	Anuar Abdul Manap	BN (UMNO)	Deputy EXCO Member
P141	Sekijang	N04	Kemelah	Raven Kumar Krishnasamy	BN (MIC)	N/A
P142	Labis	N05	Tenang	Mohd Azahar Ibrahim	BN (UMNO)	N/A
P142	Labis	N06	Bekok	Tan Chong	BN (MCA)	N/A
P143	Pagoh	N07	Bukit Kepong	Ahmad Syar'e Yusof	BN (UMNO)	N/A
P143	Pagoh	N08	Bukit Pasir	Mohamad Fazli Salleh	BN (UMNO)	EXCO Member
P144	Ledang	N09	Gambir	Sahrihan Jani	BN (UMNO)	Deputy EXCO Member
P144	Ledang	N10	Tangkak	Haw Chin Teck	BN (MCA)	N/A
P144	Ledang	N11	Serom	Nadhirah Afiqah Abdul Rahim	BN (UMNO)	Deputy EXCO Member
P145	Bakri	N12	Bentayan	Ng Yak Howe	PH (DAP)	N/A
P145	Bakri	N13	Simpang Jeram	Nazri Abdul Rahman	PH (AMANAH)	N/A
P145	Bakri	N14	Bukit Naning	Mohd Ghazali Sabari	BN (UMNO)	N/A
P146	Muar	N15	Maharani	Ashari Md Sarip	BN (UMNO)	N/A
P146	Muar	N16	Sungai Balang	Selamat Takim	BN (UMNO)	N/A
P147	Parit Sulong	N17	Semerah	Mohd Fared Mohd Khalid	BN (UMNO)	EXCO Member
P147	Parit Sulong	N18	Sri Medan	Zulkurnain Kamisan	BN (UMNO)	N/A
P148	Ayer Hitam	N19	Yong Peng	Ling Tian Soon	BN (MCA)	EXCO Member
P148	Ayer Hitam	N20	Semarang	Samsolbari Jamali	BN (UMNO)	Deputy Speaker
P149	Sri Gading	N21	Parit Yaani	Mohamad Najib Samuri	BN (UMNO)	Deputy EXCO Member
P149	Sri Gading	N22	Parit Raja	Nor Rashidah Ramli	BN (UMNO)	N/A
P150	Batu Pahat	N23	Penggaram	Felicia Poh Rui Ling	PH (DAP)	N/A
P150	Batu Pahat	N24	Senggarang	Mohd Yusla Ismail	BN (UMNO)	N/A
P150	Batu Pahat	N25	Rengit	Zaidi Japar	BN (UMNO)	Deputy EXCO Member
P151	Simpang Renggam	N26	Machap	Onn Hafiz Ghazi	BN (UMNO)	Menteri Besar
P151	Simpang Renggam	N27	Layang-Layang	Chua Jian Boon	BN (MCA)	Deputy EXCO Member
P152	Kluang	N28	Mengkibol	Chu Poh Yee	PH (DAP)	N/A
P152	Kluang	N29	Mahkota	Syed Hussien Syed Abdullah	BN (UMNO)	Deputy EXCO Member
P153	Sembrong	N30	Paloh	Lee Ting Han	BN (MCA)	EXCO Member
P153	Sembrong	N31	Kahang	Rugendran Vellayan	BN (MIC)	Deputy EXCO Member
P154	Mersing	N32	Endau	Alwiyah Talib	BN (UMNO)	N/A
P154	Mersing	N33	Tenggaroh	Mohd Youzaimi Yusof	BN (UMNO)	Deputy EXCO Member
P155	Tenggara	N34	Panti	Muhammad Naqib Md Ghazali	BN (UMNO)	EXCO Member
P155	Tenggara	N35	Pasir Raja	Adham Baba	BN (UMNO)	N/A
P156	Kota Tinggi	N36	Sedili	Muszaide Makmor	BN (UMNO)	N/A
P156	Kota Tinggi	N37	Johor Lama	Norlizah Noh	BN (UMNO)	N/A
P157	Pengerang	N38	Penawar	Fauziah Misri	BN (UMNO)	N/A
P157	Pengerang	N39	Tanjung Surat	Aznan Tamin	BN (UMNO)	N/A
P158	Tebrau	N40	Tiram	Abdul Halim Suleiman	BN (UMNO)	Senator
P158	Tebrau	N41	Puteri Wangsa	Maszlee Malik	PH (PKR)	N/A
P159	Pasir Gudang	N42	Johor Jaya	Chan San San	BN (MCA)	Deputy EXCO Member
P159	Pasir Gudang	N43	Permas	Baharudin Mohamed Taib	BN (UMNO)	N/A
P160	Johor Bahru	N44	Larkin	Mohd Hairi Mad Shah	BN (UMNO)	EXCO Member
P160	Johor Bahru	N45	Stulang	Andrew Chen Kah Eng	PH (DAP)	N/A
P161	Pulai	N46	Perling	Pannir Selvam Paliksina Siwalinggam	BN (MIC)	EXCO Member
P161	Pulai	N47	Kempas	Ramlee Bohani	BN (UMNO)	N/A
P162	Iskandar Puteri	N48	Skudai	Kartiyaini Jeyapalan	PH (DAP)	N/A
P162	Iskandar Puteri	N49	Kota Iskandar	Pandak Ahmad	BN (UMNO)	N/A
P163	Kulai	N50	Bukit Permai	Mohd Jafni Md Shukor	BN (UMNO)	EXCO Member
P163	Kulai	N51	Bukit Batu	Kumaran Ramakrishnan	BN (MIC)	N/A
P163	Kulai	N52	Senai	Wong Bor Yang	PH (DAP)	N/A
P164	Pontian	N53	Benut	Mohd Sumali Reduan	BN (UMNO)	N/A
P164	Pontian	N54	Pulai Sebatang	Hasrunizah Hassan	BN (UMNO)	EXCO Member
P165	Tanjung Piai	N55	Pekan Nanas	Tan Eng Meng	BN (MCA)	N/A
P165	Tanjung Piai	N56	Kukup	Md Israk Abdullah	BN (UMNO)	EXCO Member

== Seating arrangement ==
Vacant	Vacant	Vacant	Vacant	Vacant	Vacant	Vacant	Vacant	Vacant	Vacant	Vacant	Vacant	Vacant	Vacant
Vacant	Vacant
Vacant	Vacant	Vacant	Vacant	Vacant	Vacant	Vacant	Vacant	Vacant	Vacant	Vacant	Vacant	Vacant	Vacant
Vacant	Vacant
Vacant	Vacant	Vacant	Vacant	Vacant	Vacant	Vacant	Vacant	Vacant	Vacant
Vacant	Vacant	Vacant	N15 Maharani	N02 Jementah	N51 Bukit Batu	N14 Bukit Naning	N07 Bukit Kepong
Vacant	Vacant
Vacant	Vacant	Vacant	Vacant	Vacant	Vacant	Vacant	Vacant	N39 Tanjung Surat	N10 Tangkak
Vacant	Vacant	Vacant	B	Vacant	N37 Johor Lama	N53 Benut
Vacant	Vacant	Vacant	C	A	Vacant	N04 Kemelah	N05 Tenang
Vacant	Vacant	Vacant	Vacant	N01 Buloh Kasap (Speaker)	N49 Kota Iskandar
Vacant	Vacant	Vacant	Vacant	N18 Sri Medan	N47 Kempas
Vacant	Vacant	Vacant	N46 Perling (EXCO Member)	N20 Semarang (Deputy Speaker)	N43 Permas
Vacant	Vacant	Vacant	N34 Panti (EXCO Member)	N27 Layang-Layang (Deputy EXCO Member)	N16 Sungai Balang
Vacant	Vacant	Vacant	N56 Kukup (EXCO Member)	N31 Kahang (Deputy EXCO Member)	N24 Senggarang
Vacant	Vacant	N48 Skudai	N54 Pulai Sebatang (EXCO Member)	N09 Gambir (Deputy EXCO Member)	N36 Sedili
Vacant	Vacant	N23 Penggaram	N08 Bukit Pasir (EXCO Member)	N42 Johor Jaya (Deputy EXCO Member)	N38 Penawar
Vacant	Vacant	N28 Mengkibol	N30 Paloh (EXCO Member)	N21 Parit Yaani (Deputy EXCO Member)	N06 Bekok
Vacant	Vacant	N41 Puteri Wangsa	N19 Yong Peng (EXCO Member)	N29 Mahkota (Deputy EXCO Member)	N55 Pekan Nanas
Vacant	Vacant	N52 Senai	N17 Semerah (EXCO Member)	N33 Tenggaroh (Deputy EXCO Member)	N32 Endau
Vacant	Vacant	N13 Simpang Jeram	N44 Larkin (EXCO Member)	N03 Pemanis (Deputy EXCO Member)	N22 Parit Raja
Vacant	Vacant	N12 Bentayan	N50 Bukit Permai (Senior EXCO Member)	N11 Serom (Deputy EXCO Member)	N35 Pasir Raja
Vacant	Vacant	N45 Stulang (Balancing Force Leader)	N26 Machap (Menteri Besar)	N25 Rengit (Deputy EXCO Member)	N40 Tiram (Senator)
Secretary
Sergeant-at-Arm	Speaker	State Secretary	State Legal Advisor	State Financial Officer
Sultan

== Role ==
The Johor State Legislative Assembly's main function is to enact laws that apply in the state. It is also the forum for members to voice their opinions on the state government's policies and implementation of those policies. Under the Privileges, Immunities and Powers Ordinance 1963, assemblymen are given the right to freely discuss current issues such as public complaints. On financial matters, the Assembly approves supply to the government and ensures that the funds are spent as approved and in the tax-payers' interest.

The State Executive Council (EXCO) is appointed from members of the State Assembly. Led by the Menteri Besar, it exercises executive power on behalf of the Sultan and is responsible to the State Assembly.

== Speakers Roll of Honour ==
Speaker	Term start	Term end	Party	Constituency
Haji Rahmat Daud	20 August 1959	1 March 1964	Alliance (UMNO)	Tampoi
Haji Ali Raya	April 1964	20 March 1969	Alliance (UMNO)	Endau
Syed Mohamed Edrus	11 May 1969	31 July 1974	Alliance (UMNO)	Glang Patah
Haji Abdullah Haji Sudin	25 August 1974	12 June 1978	BN (UMNO)	Kukup
Syed Zain Idrus Shahab Al-Haj	9 July 1978	29 March 1982	BN (UMNO)	Simpang Rengam
Syed Zain Idrus Shahab Al-Haj	23 April 1982	19 July 1986	BN (UMNO)	Simpang Rengam
Mohd Yunos Sulaiman	4 August 1986	4 October 1990	BN (UMNO)	Tanjong Puteri
Mohamed Ali Hassan	22 October 1990	6 April 1995	BN (UMNO)	Tiram
Mohamed Ali Hassan	26 April 1995	10 November 1999	BN (UMNO)	Tiram
Zainalabidin Mohamed Zin	30 November 1999	4 March 2004	BN (UMNO)	Rengit
Mohamed Ali Hassan	22 March 2004	13 February 2008	BN (UMNO)	Non-MLA
Mohamed Ali Hassan	21 April 2008	3 April 2013	BN (UMNO)	Non-MLA
Mohamad Aziz	20 June 2013	7 April 2018	BN (UMNO)	Non-MLA
Suhaizan Kayat	28 June 2018	22 January 2022	PH (AMANAH)	Non-MLA
Mohd Puad Zarkashi	21 April 2022	27 August 2026	BN (UMNO)	Rengit
Zahari Sarip	27 August 2026	Incumbent	BN (UMNO)	Buloh Kasap

== Election pendulum ==
The 2026 Johor state election witnessed 48 governmental seats and 8 non-governmental seats filled the Johor Legislative Assembly. The government side has 36 safe seats and 8 fairly safe seats, while the non-government side has 1 safe seat and 6 fairly safe seats.

2026 Johor state election

GOVERNMENT SEATS
Marginal
Maharani	Ashari Md Sarip	UMNO	38.93
Jementah	See Ann Giap	MCA	46.31
Bukit Batu	Kumaran Ramakrishnan	MIC	47.70
Perling	Pannir Selvam Paliksina Siwalinggam	MIC	48.99
Kemelah	Raven Kumar S. Krishnasamy	MIC	50.62
Endau	Alwiyah Talib	UMNO	51.62
Bukit Naning	Mohd Ghazali Sabari	UMNO	52.85
Johor Jaya	Chan San San	MCA	53.55
Fairly safe
Tenang	Mohd Azahar Ibrahim	UMNO	56.23
Tangkak	Haw Chin Teck	MCA	56.41
Bukit Pasir	Mohamad Fazli Mohamad Salleh	UMNO	57.54
Kota Iskandar	Pandak Ahmad	UMNO	58.43
Safe
Serom	Nadhirah Afiqah Abdull Rahim	UMNO	60.03
Tiram	Abdul Halim Suleiman	UMNO	60.11
Yong Peng	Ling Tian Soon	MCA	60.16
Senggarang	Mohd Yusla Ismail	UMNO	60.56
Sungai Balang	Selamat Takim	UMNO	60.81
Gambir	Sahrihan Jani	UMNO	61.01
Bukit Kepong	Ahmad Syar'e Yusof	UMNO	61.42
Parit Yaani	Najib Samuri	UMNO	62.02
Bekok	Tan Chong	MCA	63.16
Permas	Baharudin Mohamed Taib	UMNO	64.77
Kempas	Ramlee Bohani	UMNO	65.22
Paloh	Lee Ting Han	MCA	66.40
Mahkota	Syed Hussien Syed Abdullah	UMNO	66.52
Bukit Permai	Mohd Jafni Md Shukor	UMNO	67.18
Semerah	Mohd Fared Mohd Khalid	UMNO	66.96
Layang-Layang	Chua Jian Boon	MCA	67.17
Larkin	Mohd Hairi Mad Shah	UMNO	67.47
Pemanis	Anuar Abd Manap	UMNO	68.12
Parit Raja	Nor Rashidah Ramli	UMNO	69.20
Pulai Sebatang	Hasrunizah Hassan	UMNO	70.49
Kahang	Rugendran Vellayan	MIC	71.74
Buloh Kasap	Zahari Sarip	UMNO	72.04
Rengit	Zaidi Japar	UMNO	72.06
Pekan Nanas	Tan Eng Meng	MCA	72.23
Kukup	Md Israk Abdullah	UMNO	72.31
Tenggaroh	Mohd Youzaimi Yusof	UMNO	74.58
Pasir Raja	Adham Baba	UMNO	74.90
Sri Medan	Zulkurnain Kamisan	UMNO	75.55
Panti	Muhammad Naqib Md Ghazali	UMNO	76.55
Semarang	Samsolbari Jamali	UMNO	78.00
Johor Lama	Norlizah Noh	UMNO	79.89
Machap	Onn Hafiz Ghazi	UMNO	80.28
Penawar	Fauziah Misri	UMNO	82.12
Sedili	Muszaide Makmor	UMNO	85.18
Benut	Mohd Sumali Reduan	UMNO	86.89
Tanjung Surat	Aznan Tamin	UMNO	90.51

NON-GOVERNMENT SEATS
Marginal
Simpang Jeram	Nazri Abd Rahman	AMANAH	41.03
Stulang	Andrew Chen Kah Eng	DAP	47.32
Puteri Wangsa	Maszlee Malik	PKR	48.44
Senai	Wong Bor Yang	DAP	52.08
Penggaram	Felica Poh Rui Ling	DAP	54.61
Mengkibol	Chu Poh Yee	DAP	54.86
Fairly safe
Skudai	Kartiyaini Jeyapalan	DAP	58.74
Safe
Bentayan	Ng Yak Howe	DAP	64.07

== List of Assemblies ==
Assembly	Term began	Members	Committee	Governing parties
State Council	1955	34	Wan Idris	Alliance (UMNO–MCA–MIC)
1st	1959	32	Hassan I	Alliance (UMNO–MCA–MIC)
2nd	1964	32	Hassan II (1964–1967); Othman I (1967–1969)	Alliance (UMNO–MCA–MIC)
3rd	1969	32	Othman II	Alliance (UMNO–MCA–MIC) (1969–1973)
3rd	1969	32	Othman II	BN (UMNO–MCA–MIC) (1973–1974)
4th	1974	32	Othman III	BN (UMNO–MCA–MIC)
5th	1978	32	Othman IV	BN (UMNO–MCA–MIC)
6th	1982	32	Abdul Ajib	BN (UMNO–MCA–MIC–GERAKAN)
7th	1986	36	Muhyiddin I	BN (UMNO–MCA–MIC–GERAKAN)
8th	1990	36	Muhyiddin II	BN (UMNO–MCA–MIC–GERAKAN)
9th	1995	40	Abdul Ghani I	BN (UMNO–MCA–MIC–GERAKAN)
10th	1999	40	Abdul Ghani II	BN (UMNO–MCA–MIC–GERAKAN)
11th	2004	56	Abdul Ghani III	BN (UMNO–MCA–MIC–GERAKAN)
12th	2008	56	Abdul Ghani IV	BN (UMNO–MCA–MIC–GERAKAN)
13th	2013	56	Mohamed Khaled	BN (UMNO–MCA–MIC–GERAKAN)
14th	2018	56	Osman (2018–2019); Sahruddin (2019–2020)	PH (BERSATU–DAP–AMANAH–PKR) (2018–2020)
14th	2018	56	Hasni (2020–2022)	BN (UMNO–MIC)–PN (BERSATU–PAS) (2020–2022)
15th	2022	56	Onn Hafiz I	BN (UMNO–MCA–MIC)
16th	2026	56	Onn Hafiz II	BN (UMNO–MCA–MIC)

== See also ==
- Johor State Executive Council
- State legislative assemblies of Malaysia
- List of state seats representatives in Malaysia
