= Mohd Izhar Ahmad =

Malaysian politician

Yang Berbahagia Datuk Mohd Izhar Ahmad DPSM
- محمّد إظهار أحمد

Member of the Johor State Executive Council
- 2020–2022: Chairman of the Investment, Entrepreneur Development, Co-operatives and Human Resources

Member of the Johor State Legislative Assembly for Larkin
- In office 9 May 2018 – 12 March 2022
- Preceded by: Position established
- Succeeded by: Mohd Hairi Mad Shah
- Majority: 8,590 (2018)

Faction represented in the Johor State Legislative Assembly
- 2018–2020: Pakatan Harapan
- 2020: Malaysian United Indigenous Party
- 2020–2022: Perikatan Nasional

Personal details
- Born: 1958 (age 67–68) Johor Bahru, Johor, Malaysia
- Citizenship: Malaysia
- Party: Malaysian United Indigenous Party (BERSATU) (2018–2022); National Trust Party (AMANAH) (since 2023)
- Other political affiliations: Pakatan Harapan (PH) (2018–2020; since 2023); Perikatan Nasional (PN) (2020–2022)
- Occupation: Politician

Datuk Mohd Izhar bin Ahmad (born 1958) is a Malaysian politician who served as Member of the Johor State Executive Council (EXCO) in the Barisan Nasional (BN) state administration under Menteri Besar Hasni Mohammad from March 2020 to March 2022 and Member of the Johor State Legislative Assembly (MLA) for Larkin from May 2018 to March 2022. He is a member of the National Trust Party (AMANAH), a component party of the Pakatan Harapan (PH) coalition and formerly a member of the Malaysian United Indigenous Party (BERSATU), a component party of the Perikatan Nasional (PN) coalition.

On 29 January 2022, Izhar announced that he had resigned from BERSATU citing a loss of confidence in party president Muhyiddin Yassin and would not seek for reelection as a Johor MLA for in the 2022 Johor state election and throwing his support behind BN. He was the second Johor MLA from PN-BERSATU to do so after Puteri Wangsa MLA, Mazlan Bujang.

== Election results ==
Johor State Legislative Assembly
Year	Constituency	Candidate	Votes	Pct	Opponent(s)	Votes	Pct	Ballots cast	Majority	Turnout
2018	N44 Larkin	Mohd Izhar Ahmad (BERSATU)	25,012	55.99%	Yahya Ja'afar (UMNO)	16,422	36.77%	45,341	8,590	81.20%
2018	N44 Larkin	Mohd Izhar Ahmad (BERSATU)	25,012	55.99%	Zakiah Tukirin (PAS)	3,233	7.24%	45,341	8,590	81.20%

== Honours ==
- Malacca
  - Companion Class II of the Exalted Order of Malacca (DPSM) – Datuk (2020)
