= Maszlee Malik =

Malaysian politician (born 1974)

Yang Berhormat Prof. Dr. Maszlee Malik SSP MLA
- مزلي مالک
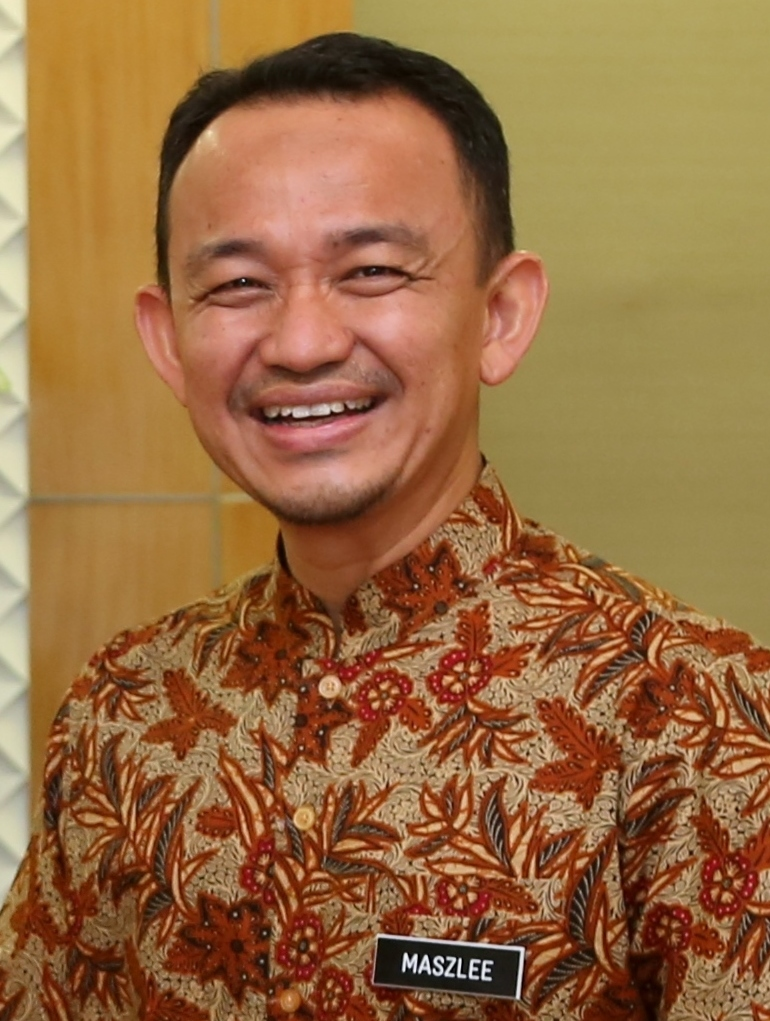
- Maszlee in 2018

Member of the Johor State Legislative Assembly for Puteri Wangsa
- Incumbent
- Assumed office 11 July 2026
- Preceded by: Amira Aisya Abdul Aziz (MUDA)
- Majority: 5,744 (2026)

Minister of Education
- In office 21 May 2018 – 3 January 2020
- Monarchs: Muhammad V (2018–2019); Abdullah (2019–2020)
- Prime Minister: Mahathir Mohamad
- Deputy: Teo Nie Ching
- Preceded by: Mahdzir Khalid (Minister of Education); Idris Jusoh (Minister of Higher Education)
- Succeeded by: Mahathir Mohamad (Acting Minister of Education); Mohd Radzi Md Jidin (Minister of Education); Noraini Ahmad (Minister of Higher Education)
- Constituency: Simpang Renggam

Member of the Malaysian Parliament for Simpang Renggam
- In office 9 May 2018 – 19 November 2022
- Preceded by: Liang Teck Meng (BN–GERAKAN)
- Succeeded by: Hasni Mohammad (BN–UMNO)
- Majority: 3,475 (2018)

7th President of the International Islamic University Malaysia
- In office 5 September 2018 – 9 November 2018
- Chancellor: Ahmad Shah
- Preceded by: Rais Yatim
- Succeeded by: Mohd Daud Bakar

Chairman of the International Institute of Advanced Islamic Studies
- Incumbent
- Assumed office 31 March 2023

Personal details
- Born: Maszlee bin Malik; 19 December 1974 (age 51) Johor Bahru, Johor, Malaysia
- Citizenship: Malaysian
- Party: PKR (2017–2018, 2021–present); BERSATU (2018–2020); Independent (2020–2021)
- Other political affiliations: Pakatan Harapan (2017–present)
- Education: Al al-Bayt University (BA); University of Malaya (MA); Durham University (PhD)
- Occupation: Politician, lecturer, Actor

Maszlee bin Malik (Jawi: مزلي بن مالک, born 1974) is a Malaysian politician who has served as a Member of the Johor State Legislative Assembly (MLA) for Puteri Wangsa since July 2026. He has also served Chairman of the International Institute of Advanced Islamic Studies (IAIS) since March 2023.

He served as the Minister of Education in the Pakatan Harapan (PH) administration under former Prime Minister Mahathir Mohamad from May 2018 until January 2020, and was the Member of Parliament (MP) for Simpang Renggam from May 2018 to November 2022. He briefly held the position of President of the International Islamic University Malaysia (IIUM) from September 2018 to November 2018.

A member of the People's Justice Party (PKR), he holds the position of Division Chief of Simpang Renggam. Prior to that, he was a member of the Parti Pribumi Bersatu Malaysia (BERSATU). He is also professor at the University of Cyberjaya's psychology and social sciences faculty.

== Background ==
Maszlee bin Malik was born in Johor Bahru, Johor, in 1974. He is of Malays, Hakka Chinese and Bugis descent. Maszlee attended the English College and obtained a bachelor's degree in Islamic Jurisprudence from the University of Al-Bayt and a master's degree in the same field from the University of Malaya. He obtained a doctorate in Political Science from Durham University. His PhD thesis was titled "Constructing the Architectonics and Formulating the Articulation of Islamic Governance: A Discursive Attempt in Islamic Epistemology". He speaks Malay, Arabic, English, French, German, Mandarin, and very simple Hokkien.

== Career ==
=== Academia ===
Maszlee taught at the International Islamic University Malaysia.

=== Politics ===
Maszlee made his political debut by registering as a member of the People's Justice Party (PKR) Ampang branch in 2017. Later he joined another Pakatan Harapan (PH) coalition's component party, the Malaysian United Indigenous Party (BERSATU), in March 2018, ahead of the 2018 general election (GE14), which he won against incumbent Liang Teck Meng for the Simpang Renggam constituency. On 18 May 2018, Maszlee was appointed as Malaysia's new Minister of Education after Prime Minister Tun Mahathir Mohamad vacated the post just one day after taking it. After 20 months of his appointment, he resigned from the ministerial position in January 2020 as requested by the Prime Minister.

His BERSATU membership was canceled in May 2020 after the collapse of the PH government, following the party's decision to leave PH in the so-called 'Sheraton Move' during the 2020 political crisis. He then became an independent MP. After being a PH-friendly independent for over a year, he rejoined PKR and PH again in November 2021.

On 14 February 2022, he was confirmed to be contesting for the Layang-Layang state seat representing PH and PKR in the 2022 Johor state election. The state seat is within his Simpang Renggam federal seat. He lost to the United Malays National Organisation (UMNO) incumbent, Abd. Mutalip Abd. Rahim.

In the 2022 general election, Maszlee lost his Simpang Renggam seat to UMNO's Hasni Mohammad, the former Menteri Besar of Johor. Hasni polled 18,312 votes to Maszlee's 16,491 for a 1,821-vote majority.

After the loss in the Malaysian 15th general election, he was appointed as a Professor at the University of Cyberjaya to give lectures on selected topics in humanities and education-related subjects at the 'Psychology and Social Sciences Faculty' in April 2023. He was also appointed by the Prime Minister as the chairman of an Islamic think tank called the 'International Institute of Advanced Islamic Studies' (IAIS) to advise the Prime Minister on Global Muslim Affairs.

In the 2026 Johor state election, Maszlee contested and won the seat of Puteri Wangsa, beating out incumbment Amira Aisya Abdul Aziz.

== Election results ==
Parliament of Malaysia
| Year | Constituency | Candidate | Votes | Pct | Opponent(s) | Votes | Pct | Ballots cast | Majority | Turnout |
|---|---|---|---|---|---|---|---|---|---|---|
| 2018 | P151 Simpang Renggam | Maszlee Malik (BERSATU) | 18,157 | 50.68% | Liang Teck Meng (GERAKAN) | 14,682 | 40.11% | 36,601 | 3,475 | 83.19% |
| 2018 | P151 Simpang Renggam | Maszlee Malik (BERSATU) | 18,157 | 50.68% | Mohd Jubri Selamat (PAS) | 2,983 | 8.15% | 36,601 | 3,475 | 83.19% |
| 2022 | P151 Simpang Renggam | Maszlee Malik (PKR) | 16,491 | 37.37% | Hasni Mohammad (UMNO) | 18,312 | 41.49% | 44,131 | 1,821 | 74.76% |
| 2022 | P151 Simpang Renggam | Maszlee Malik (PKR) | 16,491 | 37.37% | Mohd Fazrul Kamat (BERSATU) | 9,077 | 20.57% | 44,131 | 1,821 | 74.76% |
| 2022 | P151 Simpang Renggam | Maszlee Malik (PKR) | 16,491 | 37.37% | Kamal Kusmin (PEJUANG) | 251 | 0.57% | 44,131 | 1,821 | 74.76% |

Johor State Legislative Assembly
| Year | Constituency | Candidate | Votes | Pct | Opponent(s) | Votes | Pct | Ballots cast | Majority | Turnout |
|---|---|---|---|---|---|---|---|---|---|---|
| 2022 | N27 Layang-Layang | Maszlee Malik (PKR) | 4,736 | 34.50% | Abd. Mutalip Abd. Rahim (UMNO) | 7,551 | 55.00% | 13,729 | 2,815 | 54.59% |
| 2022 | N27 Layang-Layang | Maszlee Malik (PKR) | 4,736 | 34.50% | Alagenthiran Krishnan (BERSATU) | 1,278 | 9.31% | 13,729 | 2,815 | 54.59% |
| 2022 | N27 Layang-Layang | Maszlee Malik (PKR) | 4,736 | 34.50% | Ahmad Shafiq Othman (PEJUANG) | 164 | 1.19% | 13,729 | 2,815 | 54.59% |
| 2026 | N41 Puteri Wangsa | Maszlee Malik (PKR) | 41,821 | 48.44% | Teow Chia Ling (MCA) | 36,077 | 41.78% | 86,344 | 5,744 | 67.62% |
| 2026 | N41 Puteri Wangsa | Maszlee Malik (PKR) | 41,821 | 48.44% | Rashifa Aljunied (MUDA) | 5,887 | 6.82% | 86,344 | 5,744 | 67.62% |
| 2026 | N41 Puteri Wangsa | Maszlee Malik (PKR) | 41,821 | 48.44% | Nicholas Paul Vincent (BERSAMA) | 2,332 | 2.70% | 86,344 | 5,744 | 67.62% |
| 2026 | N41 Puteri Wangsa | Maszlee Malik (PKR) | 41,821 | 48.44% | Wang Wee Szong (Independent) | 227 | 0.26% | 86,344 | 5,744 | 67.62% |

== Honours ==
- Perlis
  - Companion of the Order of Prince Syed Sirajuddin Jamalullail of Perlis (SSP) (2007)

== Filmography ==
=== Film ===
| Year | Title | Role | Notes |
|---|---|---|---|
| 2021 | Taruh | Prisoner 237 | Short film |
| 2022 | Kudeta | Jamal Banna | Serial drama |
