= 2022 Johor state election =

State election in Malaysia

- 12 March 2022

All 56 seats of the Johor State Legislative Assembly 29 seats needed for a majority
- Registered: 2,539,606 (▲39.69%)
- Turnout: 54.92% (▼29.58%)

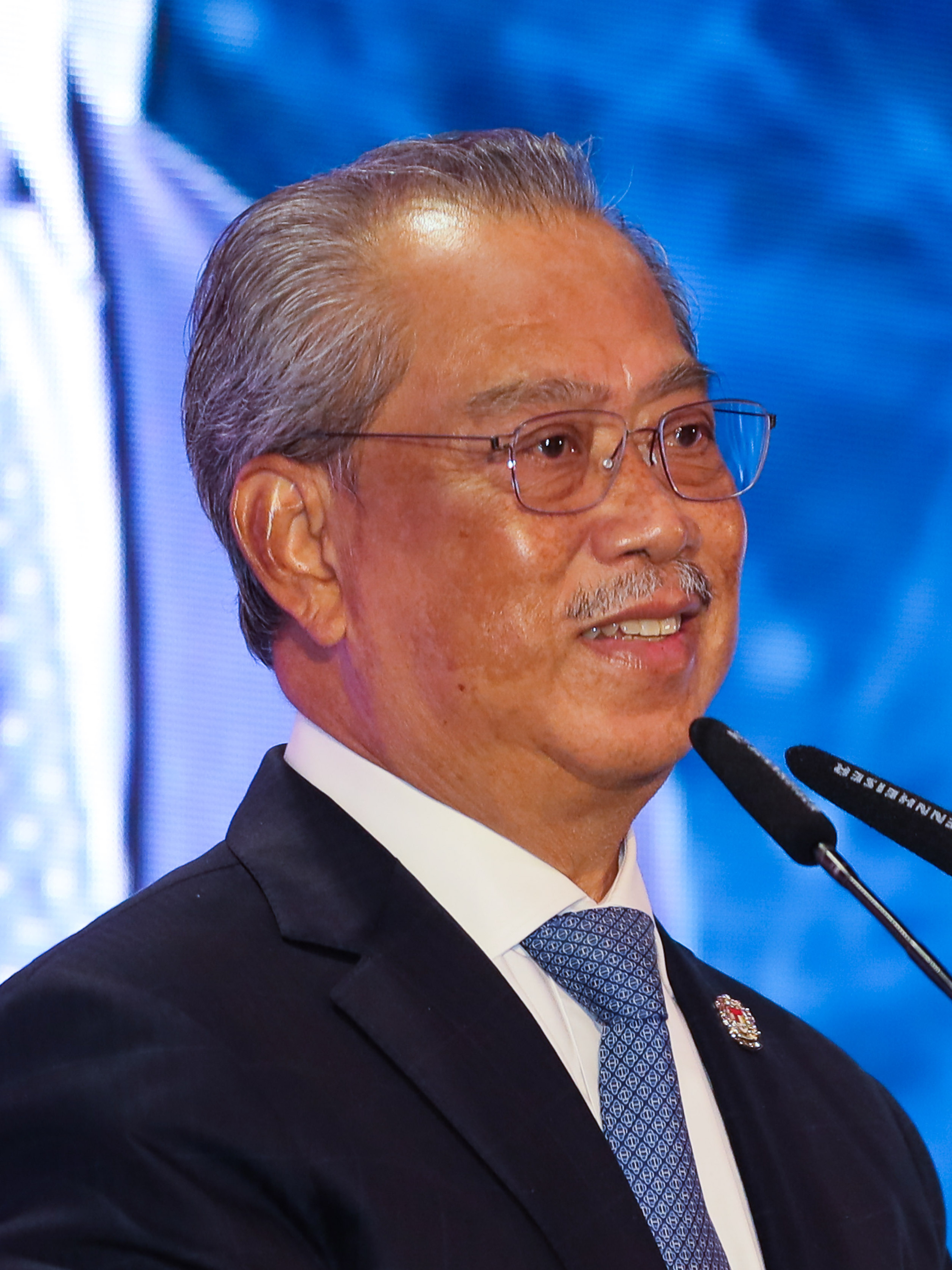

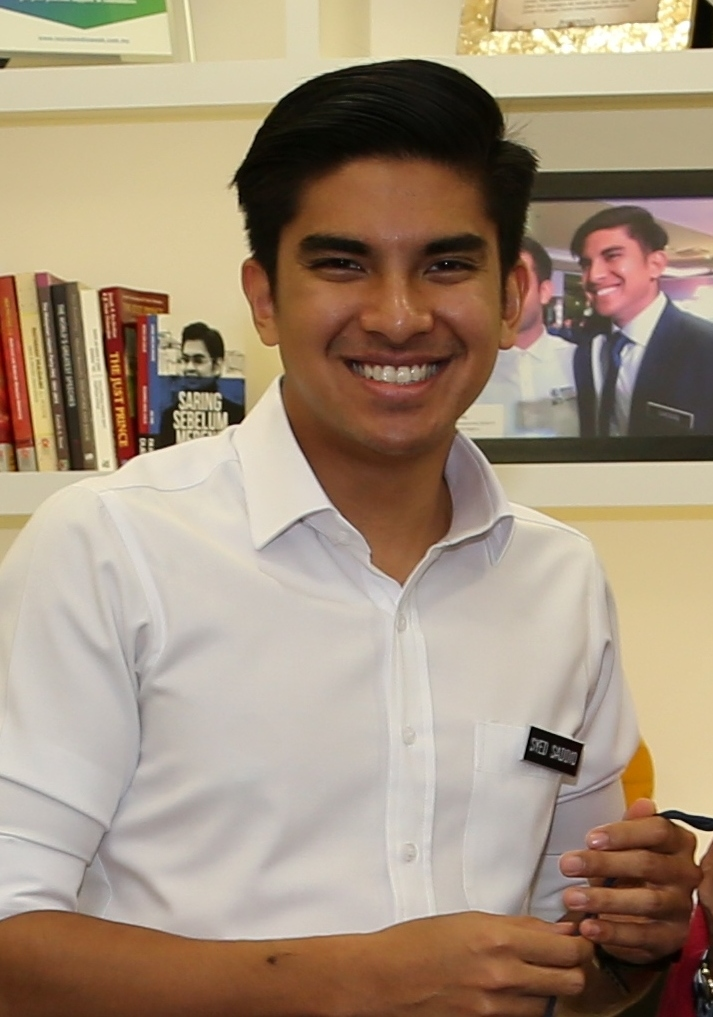
	Majority party	Minority party
Leader	Hasni Mohammad	Aminolhuda Hassan
Party	UMNO	AMANAH
Alliance	Barisan Nasional	Pakatan Harapan
Leader since	30 June 2018	28 February 2020
Leader's seat	Benut	Parit Yaani (lost seat)
Last election	19 seats, 37.69% (Note: Excludes GERAKAN, which was part of the coalition in the 2018 election but subsequently left and later joined Perikatan Nasional in February 2021. The original number of seats and vote share held by Barisan Nasional as it was in 2018 was 19 seats and 38.68%, respectively.)	28 seats, 39.10% (Note: Excludes BERSATU, which was part of the coalition in the 2018 election but subsequently left and later formed Perikatan Nasional in 2020. The original number of seats and vote share held by Pakatan Harapan as it was in 2018 was 36 seats and 53.36%, respectively.)
Seats before	16	27
Seats won	40	12
Seat change	▲24	▼15
Popular vote	599,753	367,525
Percentage	43.11%	26.42%
Swing	▲5.42 pp	▼12.68 pp
	Third party	Fourth party
Leader	Muhyiddin Yassin	Syed Saddiq Syed Abdul Rahman
Party	BERSATU	MUDA
Alliance	Perikatan Nasional	Pakatan Harapan Plus (Note: Participated in an electoral pact with DAP and AMANAH without joining PH)
Leader since	5 January 2021	17 September 2020
Leader's seat	Gambir (not seeking re-election)	Did not stand (Note: Syed Saddiq is the leader of MUDA in the election despite not contesting as a candidate. He is also the incumbent MP for Muar.)
Last election	9 seats, 23.14% (Note: New coalition formed in 2020. These numbers are the total seats and vote share of BERSATU, PAS and GERAKAN in the last election. The parties were previously part of Pakatan Harapan, Gagasan Sejahtera and Barisan Nasional respectively.)	New
Seats before	12	New
Seats won	3	1
Seat change	▼9	▲1
Popular vote	334,457	48,072
Percentage	24.04%	3.46%
Swing	▲0.90 pp	New
- Results by constituency
Menteri Besar before election
Hasni Mohammad
BN-PN coalition
Elected Menteri Besar
Onn Hafiz Ghazi
BN

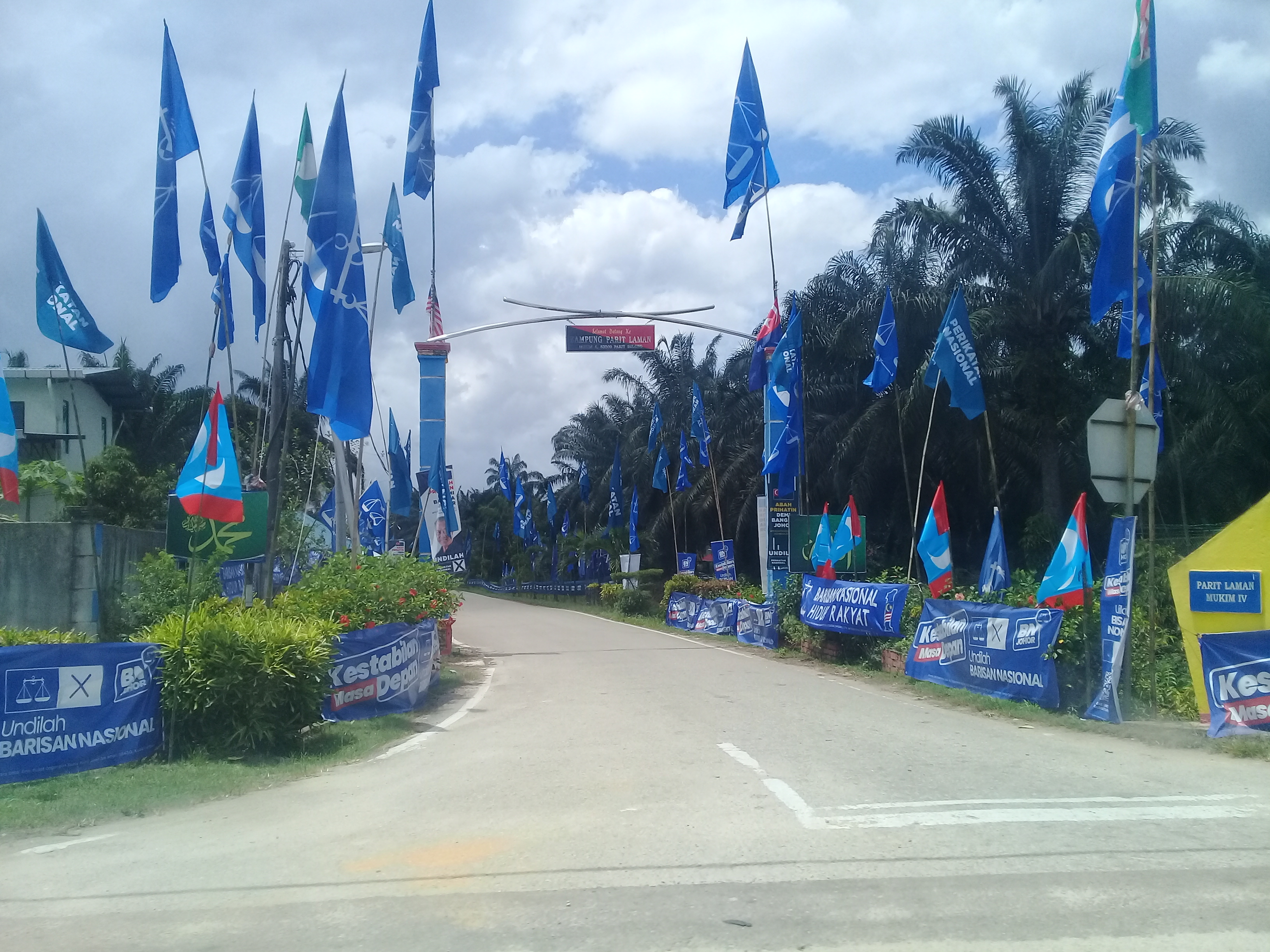
Village in Batu Pahat District during the election.

The 2022 Johor state election, formally the 15th Johor general election, took place on 12 March 2022. The election was to elect 56 members of the 15th Johor State Legislative Assembly. The previous assembly was dissolved on 22 January 2022.

The state election was conducted in the midst of the 2020–2022 Malaysian political crisis and the COVID-19 pandemic in Malaysia. The state election is notable for being the first elections to have UNDI18 voters, where 18-year-olds were allowed to vote.

The snap election was called prematurely after the government led by Menteri Besar Hasni Mohammad had lost a simple majority in the legislature, being left with a minority government of just 28 seats, above one seat against the 27 seats of the opposition following the death of Kempas assemblyman and former Menteri Besar Osman Sapian on 21 December 2021 before the dissolution. The Sultan of Johor, Sultan Ibrahim Iskandar consented to the dissolution of the Johor State Legislative Assembly on 22 January 2022.

The state election is the fourth election after the 2018 general election, resulting in the most non-simultaneous elections between federal and state elections in a single 5-year term of parliament in the nation's history. The state election is also the third election after Ismail Sabri Yaakob took over as Prime Minister in August 2021. The state election would also be the first in which 18-20 year olds are eligible to vote after the gazettement of the constitutional amendment on 15 December 2021.

Barisan Nasional (BN) continued its landslide winning streak in recent state elections, capturing 40 seats to secure its first standalone supermajority in Johor since 2008. Meanwhile, Pakatan Harapan (PH) suffered heavy losses, retaining only 12 seats, while Perikatan Nasional (PN) took just 3 seats. The Malaysian United Democratic Alliance (MUDA) won 1 seat in its election debut.

== Election cycles ==
Johor became the fourth state in Malaysia to not hold its state elections simultaneously with national elections, after Sarawak (since 1979), Sabah (since 2020), and Malacca (since 2021).

Kelantan (1978–1982) held its state election in March 1978 following a political crisis the previous year, but national elections were held only 4 months later. Since then, election cycles in Kelantan have synchronized with national elections.

== Electoral system ==
Elections in Malaysia are conducted at the federal and state levels. Federal elections elect members of the Dewan Rakyat, the lower house of Parliament, while state elections in each of the 13 states elect members of their respective state legislative assembly. As Malaysia follows the Westminster system of government, the head of government (Prime Minister at the federal level and the Menteri Besar/Chief Ministers at the state level) is the person who commands the confidence of the majority of members in the respective legislature – this is normally the leader of the party or coalition with the majority of seats in the legislature.

The Legislative Assembly consists of 56 members, known as Members of the Legislative Assembly (MLAs), that are elected for five-year terms. Each MLA is elected from a single-member constituencies using the first-past-the-post voting system; each constituency contains approximately an equal number of voters. If one party obtains a majority of seats, then that party is entitled to form the government, with its leader becoming the Chief Minister. In the event of a hung parliament, where no single party obtains the majority of seats, the government may still form through a coalition or a confidence and supply agreement with other parties. In practice, coalitions and alliances in Malaysia, and by extension, in Johor, generally persist between elections, and member parties do not normally contest for the same seats.

Coalition(s)			Other parties
Government		Opposition	Other parties
Barisan Nasional (BN)	Perikatan Nasional (PN)	Pakatan Harapan (PH)	Homeland Fighter's Party (PEJUANG); Heritage Party (WARISAN); Malaysian United Democratic Alliance (MUDA) (Note: Participated in an electoral pact with DAP and AMANAH without joining PH); Parti Bangsa Malaysia (PBM); Socialist Party of Malaysia (PSM); Malaysian Mighty Bumiputera Party (PUTRA)
United Malays National Organisation (UMNO); Malaysian Chinese Association (MCA); Malaysian Indian Congress (MIC)	Malaysian United Indigenous Party (BERSATU); Malaysian Islamic Party (PAS); Parti Gerakan Rakyat Malaysia (GERAKAN)	Democratic Action Party (DAP) (Note: Signed electoral pact with MUDA, a non-PH party); People's Justice Party (PKR); National Trust Party (AMANAH) (Note: Signed electoral pact with MUDA, a non-PH party)	Homeland Fighter's Party (PEJUANG); Heritage Party (WARISAN); Malaysian United Democratic Alliance (MUDA); Parti Bangsa Malaysia (PBM); Socialist Party of Malaysia (PSM); Malaysian Mighty Bumiputera Party (PUTRA)

== Constituencies ==
Map of constituencies to be contested

== Composition before dissolution ==
Government				Confidence and supply
BN		PN		PH
16		12		27
14	2	11	1	14	7	6
UMNO	MIC	BERSATU	PAS	DAP	PKR	AMANAH

== Timeline ==
Dates	Events
22 January 2022	Dissolution of the Johor State Legislative Assembly
9 February 2022	Issue of the Writ of Election
26 February 2022	Nomination day
27 February–11 March 2022	Campaigning period
8 March 2022	Early polling day for postal and advance voters
12 March 2022	Polling day

=== Events from the Dissolution of the Johor State Legislative Assembly to the Issue of the Writ of Election (22 January to 9 February 2022) ===
Dates	Events
22 January 2022	Menteri Besar of Johor Hasni Mohammad was given a mandate by the supreme council and Johor state liaison committee of the United Malays National Organisation (UMNO) to seek an audience with Sultan of Johor Ibrahim Ismail and advise for his consent to dissolve the 14th Johor State Legislative Assembly to pave way for the 2022 Johor state election. Sultan Ibrahim consented to the advice and the assembly was officially dissolved. Hasni held a press conference after the audience and explained that his advice was due to serious political instability provided that his government has lost the simple majority in the assembly to govern the state and he wanted to seek a "fresh mandate" to form a strong state government to oversee Johor through a more rapid development.
22 January 2022	Johor Pakatan Harapan (PH) claimed that it held talks to cooperate with Malaysian United Democratic Alliance (MUDA) in the election.
22 January 2022	Malaysian Islamic Party (PAS) expressed their intention to contest and will discuss with UMNO and the Malaysian United Indigenous Party (BERSATU) on their cooperation forms.
22 January 2022	Heritage Party (WARISAN) claimed that it will "assess the situation on the ground" before deciding to contest in the election or not.
22 January 2022	Malaysian Indian Congress (MIC) expressed its intention to contest 4 state seats in the election it considers as its traditional seats within BN coalition.
23 January 2022	Speaker of the assembly Suhaizan Kayat has officially informed the Election Commission (EC) about the dissolution of the assembly for EC to determine the dates of the nomination, early polling and polling days after receiving the dissolution documents signed by Sultan Ibrahim.
23 January 2022	Johor Pakatan Harapan (PH) issued a statement to reiterate its firm stance to oppose the dissolution of the assembly and the holding of the election on the reason that the people of Johor are still facing the challenges brought about by the COVID-19 pandemic and 2021–2022 Malaysian floods and it would be "a waste of the peoples money".
23 January 2022	Homeland Fighter's Party (PEJUANG) expressed its intention to contest 42 out of 56 state seats in the election without cooperating with other parties.
23 January 2022	Barisan Nasional (BN) expressed its confidence of gaining supermajority, claiming it will contest alone in all 56 seats.
23 January 2022	United Malays National Organisation (UMNO) plans to collaborate with Malaysian Indian Muslim Congress (KIMMA) which has pledged support through its Jalinan Rakyat (JR) machinery in the state election.
24 January 2022	Election Commission of Malaysia stated that it will convene a special meeting to discuss important election dates on 9 February.
24 January 2022	United Malays National Organisation (UMNO) expressed its intention to contest 42 out of 56 state seats in the election, pending negotiations with other parties within the Barisan Nasional coalition.
24 January 2022	Pakatan Harapan (PH) president Anwar Ibrahim stated that the coalition party is opening talks for cooperation with all opposition parties, including Pejuang, MUDA and Warisan.
25 January 2022	Malaysian United Democratic Alliance (MUDA) clarified that it will hold internal talks on its participation in the election and electoral partner.
25 January 2022	Perikatan Nasional (PN) declared its readiness to contest all 56 seats, claiming that while it participated in previous Johor government it was not consulted before on the dissolution of the assembly by the Menteri Besar.
26 January 2022	Heritage Party (WARISAN) claimed that if it contests the election, it will contest on its own, but honours the agreement made with MUDA.
26 January 2022	A meeting held by the Pakatan Harapan's Presidential Council finalised the usage of PKR's logo for PKR candidates and PH logo for DAP and AMANAH candidates. On separate statement, PH leader Anwar Ibrahim rejected cooperation with Perikatan Nasional as suggested by an individual from BERSATU.
27 January 2022	Pakatan Harapan announced their internal seat allocation, with PKR and AMANAH contesting 20 seats and the rest given to DAP. PKR will be contesting using its own logo. PH chairman Anwar Ibrahim planned to give DAP and AMANAH leadership power to grant approval for other parties to contest under PH logo, in line with the two parties' wish to cooperate with other opposition parties.
27 January 2022	Mazlan Bujang, a former BERSATU assemblyman before the dissolution, left BERSATU and threw support to incumbent Menteri Besar Hasni Mohammad from BN.
28 January 2022	Simpang Renggam MP, Maszlee Malik, announced the intention to use PKR's logo for all PH candidates in his constituency, regardless of party affiliation.
29 January 2022	Malaysian United Democratic Alliance (MUDA) confirmed its participation in the election.
29 January 2022	A joint statement by PAS and BERSATU styled as Muzakarah (discussion) confirms they're working together under Perikatan Nasional on the basis of ummah unity.
29 January 2022	Socialist Party of Malaysia (PSM) stated that they're discussing its participation in the election.
29 January 2022	Mohd Izhar Ahmad, former BERSATU assemblyman for Larkin before the dissolution, left BERSATU and threw support to BN, citing the need for political stability and progress.
30 January 2022	Malaysia Makkal Sakti Party (MMSP) has repeated its support as 'Friends of BN' and is hopeful to contest under the BN coalition.
4 February 2022	Pakatan Harapan (PH) announced its first candidate for the Johor state elections, the incumbent DAP assemblyman Sheikh Umar Bagharib Ali will be defending his Paloh seat.
4 February 2022	Barisan Nasional (BN) announced incumbent Menteri Besar Hasni Mohammad as its candidate for the position of Johor Menteri Besar.
5 February 2022	Pakatan Harapan (PH) announced three more of its candidates, the incumbent DAP Mengkibol assemblyman Chew Chong Sin and Penggaram assemblywoman as well as Deputy Speaker of the assembly Gan Peck Cheng will be defending their seats while incumbent AMANAH Pulai Sebatang assemblyman Muhammad Taqiuddin Cheman will switch to contest for the Mahkota seat. The party also clarified it have not determined its Menteri Besar candidate.
6 February 2022	Malaysian Chinese Association (MCA) denied the authenticity of a viral letter listing "MCA seats" in the election and claimed that consensus of its Barisan Nasional (BN) component parties will be achieved by holding discussions. BN also stated it will lean on experience from previous elections to manage its campaign under COVID-19 safety guidelines and aims to win 12 out of 16 seats in northern region of Johor after winning only two in the 2018 state election. BN Deputy Chairman Mohamad Hasan also appealed to the coalition members to stand united, avoid past mistakes that could jeopardise chances of victory in the election.
6 February 2022	Johor Fire and Rescue Department stated it would be meeting with the Election Commission (EC) to discuss the standard operating procedures (SOPs) on fire and COVID-19 safety guidelines of the election.
6 February 2022	Pakatan Harapan (PH) announced the incumbent DAP Tangkak assemblyman Ee Chin Li will be defending his seat and PKR will be using the same strategy of unveiling its candidates one-by-one as DAP in order to "give them more time to prepare for the election".
6 February 2022	Heritage Party (WARISAN) Vice-President Junz Wong revealed that WARISAN President Shafie Apdal would announce decision to contest in the election in the next few days after receiving his reports on the situation of the ground to kick off preparations such as seat negotiations and so on. He also dismissed the claim that PH had approached WARISAN for cooperation.
6 February 2022	Minister of International Trade and Industry Mohamed Azmin Ali appealed to the Johor state voters to take the performance and track record of Perikatan Nasional (PN) as the government as considerations for deciding to vote for which political coalitions or parties.
7 February 2022	Malaysian United Indigenous Party (BERSATU) Information Chief Wan Saiful Wan Jan revealed that Perikatan Nasional (PN) had completed the seat distribution among its component parties.
7 February 2022	Minister of Health Khairy Jamaluddin clarified the stance of the Ministry of Health on the election of allowing it to proceed as the "effects of the Omicron variant of COVID-19 is not as serious as the Delta variant, hence the election can still go ahead, but with the standard operating procedure (SOPs)" and said that the ministry had submitted recommendations on the SOPs to the National Security Council (MKN) and the Election Commission (EC).
7 February 2022	Deputy Minister of Plantation Industries and Commodities I and Malaysian Chinese Association (MCA) Tanjung Piai Division Chief and Member of Parliament (MP) Wee Jeck Seng said only a name for the MCA Pekan Nanas state seat candidate had been proposed and submitted to the state and federal leaderships of Barisan Nasional (BN) for approval and insinuated the candidate is the MCA Tanjung Piai Division Vice-Chief Tan Eng Meng who also contested for the same seat in the 2018 state election. Johor MCA Election Director Lim Pay Hen also reminded MCA candidates that they need to be digitally savvy to engage with voters and have their own Information Technology (IT) teams to constantly update voters on their messages and activities on social media. A Chinese New Year dinner function organised by Pontian MCA raised a hot topic of the rare presence of the incumbent Pulai Sebatang assemblyman Muhammad Taqiuddin Cheman from Pakatan Harapan (PH) in the state constituency. UMNO Secretary-General and Pontian Member of Parliament (MP) Ahmad Maslan quipped that the wrong candidate for Pulai Sebatang state seat was elected in the 2018 state election and laughed that Muhammad had been included on the list of missing persons. He also played cool of the requests by UMNO divisions to contest for seats traditionally contested by other BN component parties by saying that such requests were common affairs in the politics now and said the state and federal leaders of BN would make final decisions. Pontian MCA also vowed to be all out to regain the Pulai Sebatang state seat.
7 February 2022	20 branch leaders from Tanjung Piai Malaysian United Indigenous Party (BERSATU) Division have signed letters pledging loyalty to the party after four officebearers including its Secretary who is also Pekan Nanas Timur Branch Chief left BERSATU to join WARISAN and clarified that only Pekan Nanas Timur branch was dissolved, 20 other branches were not as well as dismissing claims that more than 300 ordinary members had left BERSATU.
7 February 2022	Malaysian Communications and Multimedia Commission (MCMC) reminded the public to be vigilant and not to be deceived by fake news asking senior citizens not to vote in the election after detecting a message viral asking so. It also stated that the reminder is important to "avoid confusion and panic among people that can trigger unwanted situations" and "stern action can be taken against those who spread fake news under relevant legislation" and advised the public to get latest information and verify authentic news from official sources.
8 February 2022	Barisan Nasional (BN) Deputy Chairman, Mohamad Hasan admitted that the new 750,000 voters would be a “big issue" for all political coalitions and parties as they have to study the attitude of the new voters and woo them to support for BN as well as reminding that not all of them are aged 18 to 21 while this group does not even make up 30% of them.
8 February 2022	Malaysian United Democratic Alliance (MUDA) denied a claim from PH that it had demanded certain number of seats from PH components, confirming while it still negotiates with other parties it would contest under its own logo.
8 February 2022	Homeland Fighters' Party (PEJUANG) President Mukhriz Mahathir said PEJUANG does not plan to join the "big camp" and uphold its principle proposed by PH to contest in the election and is going solo on its ticket and any cooperation with the other Opposition parties might only be considered later. He also said PEJUANG did not hold any serious talks with other parties.
9 February 2022	The Election Commission (EC) has fixed a set of important and official dates for the election. The EC also targets 70% of registered voters to turn up to cast their votes on the polling day. EC also encourages voters to exercise their responsibility and would run a "Jom Kita Undi" (Lets Vote) campaign by social media, public service announcement, putting up banners at strategic locations and public hotspots. The EC also called for cooperation from all quarters to take similar approach and promised to continue providing live streaming of the election process at selected state constituencies on its Facebook page. In addition, the EC also advised candidates and their agents to fill in and check their nomination papers at the offices of their respective returning officers or Johor EC office a day before, pay their deposits early to ensure smooth running of the process during nomination day, the nomination papers can only be submitted by the candidate or his proposer or seconder at the nomination centres during the nomination period. In a separate development, the EC stated that Malaysians in four neighbouring nations including southern Thailand, Singapore, Brunei, and Kalimantan (Indonesia) previously ineligible for postal voting may apply from 9 to 18 February to cast their ballots after it had addressed and repealed two major requirements for overseas voters. It also stated another adjustment is the removal of the requirement for the voter to have been in Malaysia for a certain period during the 5-year term of the previous state assembly. EC also added there are a total of 2.59 million people eligible to vote and it will be appointing 49,920 officials to carry out this election at 1,021 polling centres in Johor.
9 February 2022	DAP, AMANAH and MUDA signed an agreement unveiling the outcomes of their cooperation on seat negotiations by declaring that they will not contest against each other, with MUDA getting 6 seats previously allocated to DAP and AMANAH ranging from Tenang, Bukit Kepong, Parit Raja, Machap, Puteri Wangsa to Bukit Permai. MUDA also clarified that the seat negotiations with PKR are still ongoing to "achieve unity in facing this election" The three parties also said they would combine their election machinery to support all of their candidates as they were about to move on as election strategic partners although MUDA is not part of PH and this is in line with the "big camp" principle to unite all Opposition parties to take on the ruling BN coalition. They also promised to form the Johor state government together if they win in the election. Johor PKR Chairman Syed Ibrahim Syed Noh said PKR had offered 3 seats to MUDA and was awaiting a response to the offer.
9 February 2022	Johor DAP Chairman Liew Chin Tong confirmed that incumbent DAP Skudai assemblyman Tan Hong Pin had been dropped as a candidate without nomination by the party and would instead nominate Tan to contest for the Labis federal seat in the next general election.
9 February 2022	Barisan Nasional (BN) Chairman Ahmad Zahid Hamidi reiterated the candidate of BN for the Johor Menteri Besar position is incumbent Menteri Besar Hasni Mohammad. He also warned that the Opposition would be going all out to discredit BN in an effort to win votes and BN needed everyone to play their parts especially its cybertroopers as well as saying that BN lost in the 2018 state election due to the weak performance of its social media teams. Hasni warned BN of the need to limit numbers attending its events to comply with COVID-19 SOPs and it is not having the election to celebrate the past winning streak but to bring development to the state and return the previous glory of Johor under BN. BN Deputy Chairman Mohamad Hasan also warned BN of not being complacent after its landslide victory in the 2021 Melaka state election by saying that every elections are different as well as adding that BN set a key performance index (KPI), aiming to win at least 13 out of 15 state seats in the central region of Johor after winning only 7 in the 2018 state election. He also reminded BN component parties not to fight against each other due to disagreements in small issues like candidate nominations, seat allocations and so on that created disunity among BN that he said could affect the chance of winning in the election and had resulted in the defeat of BN in the 2018 state election, not due to the strength of PH.

=== Events from the Issue of the Writ of Election to the Nomination Day (10 to 26 February 2022) ===
Dates	Events
10 February 2022	Parti Bangsa Malaysia confirms its participation, plans to field two candidates.
10 February 2022	Homeland Fighters' Party launched their campaign and planned to announce candidates 42 seats two days before nomination day. It confirmed plans to contest alone.
13 February 2022	MIC launched their election machinery in a crowded event attended by various BN leaders including Minister of Defence Hishammuddin Hussein, incumbent Menteri Besar of Johor Hasni Mohammad, and MIC president Vigneswaran Sanasee. The Ministry of Health later issued compounds on the attendees for breaking COVID-19 prevention SOPs.
14 February 2022	PKR announced some of their candidates in three separate events across Johor. Among the candidates named was former Education Minister and incumbent Simpang Renggam MP Maszlee Malik who will be contesting in Layang-Layang.
14 February 2022	MUDA begins announcing candidates with its secretary general Amira Aisya running for Puteri Wangsa.
15 February 2022	WARISAN decided to contest in the election, announcing former assemblyman for Kukup, Suhaimi Salleh, as the party's state coordinator in Johor. As WARISAN declared itself as alternative to other established coalitions, its plan to cooperate with MUDA (who already cooperated with PH) for the election became unclear.
17 February 2022	Parti Gerakan Rakyat Malaysia (GERAKAN) submitted at least five candidates to PN leadership, an increase from its last election appearance in 2018. The party claimed all its candidates as clean and would submit their names to MACC for verification.
17 February 2022	President of WARISAN, Shafie Apdal has announced that WARISAN will be competing for the Permas seat.
18 February 2022	The Election Commission announced that they permit public speeches and house calls, subject to limitations such as not more than 100 people could attend and public speeches must be held at party operations centre and/or headquarters for no more than 2 hours and must end before 10 pm.
18 February 2022	AMANAH and DAP announced a total of 18 candidates, fielding some incumbents such as Liow Cai Tung and Salahuddin Ayub.
18 February 2022	A Perikatan Nasional event to launch its party machinery was attended by ca. 2000 members including component party leaders such as Muhyiddin Yassin. The organiser was later fined 1000 ringgits by the Ministry of Health.
19 February 2022	DAP National Organising Secretary Anthony Loke announced that Johor Chief Liew Chin Tong will be contesting in the election, but not on the Skudai seat.
20 February 2022	PSM decided to contest in the election, stating that they will announce candidates the next day. It claimed that bigger parties tend to squabble over seats and forgetting common problems encountered by Johoreans.
21 February 2022	MUDA announces 3 more candidates, naming Lim Wei Jiet for Tenang, Nurafiqah M Zulkifli for Bukit Kepong and Johor State Chairman Mohd Azrol Rahani for Bukit Permai.
21 February 2022	PSM names film director Arangkannal Rajoo as their sole candidate for Kota Iskandar.
23 February 2022	WARISAN has announced that they will be fielding their first candidate, officially, in Bukit Batu. WARISAN President, Datuk Seri Shafie Apdal has refused to announce the confirmed total of seats the party will be contesting in. They have also received 1,000 new members from UMNO, PKR, BERSATU and Putra.
24 February 2022	Barisan Nasional announced candidates for the election from UMNO and MIC. UMNO canceled its plan to contest in 42 seats as it only added absorbed seats from GERAKAN which has moved to PN since 2020, while MCA has yet to announce its candidates as its list was not finalised yet. Candidacy plans for Friends of BN such as KIMMA and MMSP were not mentioned.
24 February 2022	MUDA announced its candidates competing for Parit Raja, Machap and Larkin, with Larkin already being contested by PKR, opening possibilities that MUDA or PKR would announce further candidates.
24 February 2022	Parti Bangsa Malaysia announced Tebrau MP Steven Choong as candidate for Puteri Wangsa and named 3 constituencies it prospected to compete (Tiram, Maharani and Stulang).
24 February 2022	Homeland Fighters' Party nominates candidates for 42 constituencies, including those where MUDA are competing in.
24 February 2022	Perikatan Nasional announced candidates in all 56 constituencies with former Menteri Besar, Sahruddin Jamal, being renominated as a candidate.
24 February 2022	DAP announces its final candidates, with Liew Chin Tong contesting in Perling and Marina Ibrahim contesting in Skudai.
24 February 2022	PSM received official endorsement from People's Party of Malaysia (PRM).
25 February 2022	Heritage Party (WARISAN) announced that it would field 6 candidates in the election.
25 February 2022	MCA announced 15 candidates for the election during its anniversary celebration.
25 February 2022	PKR Johor chief Syed Ibrahim Syed Noh claimed the party will not retaliate MUDA's decision to contest in Larkin by challenging other MUDA seats, out of respect for its PH coalition partners.
25 February 2022	Malaysian Mighty Bumiputera Party announced their sole candidate for Semerah seat, Kamarolzaman Mohd Jidin.

=== Events from the Nomination Day to the Early Polling Day for Postal and Advance Voters & Campaigning Period (27 February to 12 March 2022) ===
Dates	Events
1 March 2022	Barisan Nasional launched its manifesto with a focus on five key areas.
2 March 2022	Election Commission announced the relaxation of SOP, extending the latest time allowed for speeches from 10pm to 12am.

== Electoral candidates ==
No.	Parliamentary Constituency	No.	State Constituency	Incumbent State Assemblymen	Coalition (Party)	Political coalitions and parties							
No.	Parliamentary Constituency	No.	State Constituency	Incumbent State Assemblymen	Coalition (Party)	Barisan Nasional		Pakatan Harapan & MUDA		Perikatan Nasional		Other parties/Independents	
No.	Parliamentary Constituency	No.	State Constituency	Incumbent State Assemblymen	Coalition (Party)	Candidate name	Party	Candidate name	Party	Candidate name	Party	Candidate name	Party
P140	Segamat	N01	Buloh Kasap	Zahari Sarip	BN (UMNO)	Zahari Sarip	UMNO	Subramani Chami	PKR	Norazman Md. Diah	BERSATU	Mohd Hanafi Ahmad	PEJUANG
P140	Segamat	N02	Jementah	Tan Chen Choon	PH (DAP)	See Ann Giap	MCA	Ng Kor Sim	DAP	Maimunah Safwa Musa	PAS	None	
P141	Sekijang	N03	Pemanis	Chong Fat Full	PN (BERSATU)	Anuar Abdul Manap	UMNO	Yoong Thau	PKR	Uzzair Ismail	BERSATU	Azita Amrin	PEJUANG
P141	Sekijang	N04	Kemelah	Sulaiman Mohd Nor	PH (AMANAH)	Saraswathy Nallathanby	MIC	Sulaiman Mohd Nor	AMANAH	Normala Sudirman	PAS	Norizan Sahardin	PEJUANG
P142	Labis	N05	Tenang	Mohd Solihan Badri	PN (BERSATU)	Haslinda Salleh	UMNO	Lim Wei Jiet	MUDA	Ahmad Humaizi Uzir	BERSATU		
P142	Labis	N05	Tenang	Mohd Solihan Badri	PN (BERSATU)	Haslinda Salleh	UMNO	Lim Wei Jiet	MUDA	Ahmad Humaizi Uzir	BERSATU	Mohd Fauzi Bachok	PEJUANG
P142	Labis	N06	Bekok	Ramakrishnan Suppiah	PH (DAP)	Tan Chong	MCA	Kanan Muruppiah	DAP	Tan Lek Khang	BERSATU	Sandara Segaran Arumugam	WARISAN
P143	Pagoh	N07	Bukit Kepong	Sahruddin Jamal	PN (BERSATU)	Ismail Mohamed	UMNO	Not contesting.		Sahruddin Jamal	BERSATU	Afiqah Zulkifli	MUDA
P143	Pagoh	N07	Bukit Kepong	Sahruddin Jamal	PN (BERSATU)	Ismail Mohamed	UMNO	Not contesting.		Sahruddin Jamal	BERSATU	Md. Taib Md. Suhut	PEJUANG
P143	Pagoh	N08	Bukit Pasir	Najib Lep	PN (PAS)	Mohamad Fazli Mohamad Salleh	UMNO	Elia Nadira Sabudin	AMANAH	Muhd Nur Iqbal Abd Razak	PAS	Mohd Akhiri Mahmood	PEJUANG
P143	Pagoh	N08	Bukit Pasir	Najib Lep	PN (PAS)	Mohamad Fazli Mohamad Salleh	UMNO	Elia Nadira Sabudin	AMANAH	Muhd Nur Iqbal Abd Razak	PAS	Najib Lep	IND
P143	Pagoh	N08	Bukit Pasir	Najib Lep	PN (PAS)	Mohamad Fazli Mohamad Salleh	UMNO	Elia Nadira Sabudin	AMANAH	Muhd Nur Iqbal Abd Razak	PAS	Johar Siraj	IND
P144	Ledang	N09	Gambir	Muhyiddin Yassin	PN (BERSATU)	Sahrihan Jani	UMNO	Naim Jusri	PKR	Mohd Solihan Badri	BERSATU	Suraya Sulaiman	PEJUANG
P144	Ledang	N10	Tangkak	Ee Chin Li	PH (DAP)	Ong Chee Siang	MCA	Ee Chin Li	DAP	Chong Fat Full	BERSATU	Muhammad Ariel Zabridin	PEJUANG
P144	Ledang	N10	Tangkak	Ee Chin Li	PH (DAP)	Ong Chee Siang	MCA	Ee Chin Li	DAP	Chong Fat Full	BERSATU	Zainal Bahrom A. Kadir	IND
P144	Ledang	N11	Serom	Faizul Amri Adnan	PH (PKR)	Khairin Nisa Ismail	UMNO	Abdullah Ainullotfi	AMANAH	Rahmat Daud	PAS	Abdul Azim Abdul Malek	PEJUANG
P145	Bakri	N12	Bentayan	Ng Yak Howe	PH (DAP)	Gan Q'i Ru	MCA	Ng Yak Howe	DAP	Eddy Tan Kok Hong	GERAKAN	None	
P145	Bakri	N13	Simpang Jeram	Salahuddin Ayub	PH (AMANAH)	Lokman Md Don	UMNO	Salahuddin Ayub	AMANAH	Zarul Salleh	PAS	Mahaizal Mahmor	PEJUANG
P145	Bakri	N14	Bukit Naning	Md Ysahruddin Kusni	PH (PKR)	Fuad Tukirin	UMNO	Md Ysahruddin Kusni	PKR	Mahathir Abu Said	BERSATU	Ibrahim Shafe'e	PEJUANG
P145	Bakri	N14	Bukit Naning	Md Ysahruddin Kusni	PH (PKR)	Fuad Tukirin	UMNO	Md Ysahruddin Kusni	PKR	Mahathir Abu Said	BERSATU	S. Jeganathan	IND
P146	Muar	N15	Maharani	Nor Hayati Bachok	PH (AMANAH)	Noor Fara Shamsudin	UMNO	Nor Hayati Bachok	AMANAH	Abdul Aziz Talib	PAS	Hasni Asmui	PBM
P146	Muar	N15	Maharani	Nor Hayati Bachok	PH (AMANAH)	Noor Fara Shamsudin	UMNO	Nor Hayati Bachok	AMANAH	Abdul Aziz Talib	PAS	Riad Ahmad	PEJUANG
P146	Muar	N15	Maharani	Nor Hayati Bachok	PH (AMANAH)	Noor Fara Shamsudin	UMNO	Nor Hayati Bachok	AMANAH	Abdul Aziz Talib	PAS	Lim Kim Joo	IND
P146	Muar	N16	Sungai Balang	Zaiton Ismail	BN (UMNO)	Selamat Takim	UMNO	Abdullah Sahid	PKR	Zainudin Sayuti	BERSATU	Intan Nadira Mustafa Kamal	PEJUANG
P147	Parit Sulong	N17	Semerah	Mohd Khuzzan Abu Bakar	PH (PKR)	Mohd Fared Mohd Khalid	UMNO	Mohd Khuzzan Abu Bakar	PKR	Ariss Samsudin	BERSATU	Mahdzir Ibrahim	PEJUANG
P147	Parit Sulong	N17	Semerah	Mohd Khuzzan Abu Bakar	PH (PKR)	Mohd Fared Mohd Khalid	UMNO	Mohd Khuzzan Abu Bakar	PKR	Ariss Samsudin	BERSATU	Kamarolzaman Mohd Jidin	PUTRA
P147	Parit Sulong	N18	Sri Medan	Zulkurnain Kamisan	BN (UMNO)	Zulkurnain Kamisan	UMNO	Azmi Masrani	PKR	Halim Othman Kepol	PAS	Mohd Firdaus Abdul Malek	PEJUANG
P148	Ayer Hitam	N19	Yong Peng	Chew Peck Choo	PH (DAP)	Ling Tian Soon	MCA	Alan Tee Boon Tsong	DAP	Susan Yong Fui Ling	GERAKAN	None	
P148	Ayer Hitam	N20	Semarang	Samsol Bari Jamali	BN (UMNO)	Samsol Bari Jamali	UMNO	Haryati Abu Nasir	PKR	Shazani A. Hamid	BERSATU	Adzlan Raju	PEJUANG
P149	Sri Gading	N21	Parit Yaani	Aminolhuda Hassan	PH (AMANAH)	Mohd Najib Samuri	UMNO	Aminolhuda Hassan	AMANAH	Ahmad Nawfal Mahfodz	PAS	Mohd Ridhauddin Mohd Tahir	PEJUANG
P149	Sri Gading	N22	Parit Raja	Nor Rashidah Ramli	BN (UMNO)	Nor Rashidah Ramli	UMNO	Not contesting.		Zulkifli Mat Daud	BERSATU	Fikri Musa	MUDA
P149	Sri Gading	N22	Parit Raja	Nor Rashidah Ramli	BN (UMNO)	Nor Rashidah Ramli	UMNO	Not contesting.		Zulkifli Mat Daud	BERSATU	Abdul Lateef Mahrani	PEJUANG
P150	Batu Pahat	N23	Penggaram	Gan Peck Cheng	PH (DAP)	Ter Hwa Kwong	MCA	Gan Peck Cheng	DAP	Ronald Sia Wee Yet	BERSATU	Zahari Osman	IND
P150	Batu Pahat	N24	Senggarang	Khairuddin A. Rahim	PH (PKR)	Mohd Yusla Ismail	UMNO	Abdul Hamid Jamah	AMANAH	Kahirul Faizi Ahmad Kamil	PAS	Zalihah Jaffar	PEJUANG
P150	Batu Pahat	N24	Senggarang	Khairuddin A. Rahim	PH (PKR)	Mohd Yusla Ismail	UMNO	Abdul Hamid Jamah	AMANAH	Kahirul Faizi Ahmad Kamil	PAS	Baharudin Abdullah	IND
P150	Batu Pahat	N25	Rengit	Ayub Jamil	BN (UMNO)	Mohd Puad Zarkashi	UMNO	Khairuddin A. Rahim	PKR	Mohammad Huzair Lajis	BERSATU	Nizam Bashir Abdul Kariem Bashir	PEJUANG
P151	Simpang Renggam	N26	Machap	Abd. Taib Abu Bakar	BN (UMNO)	Onn Hafiz Ghazi	UMNO	Not contesting.		Azlisham Azhar	PAS	Sangaran Rawisandran	MUDA
P151	Simpang Renggam	N26	Machap	Abd. Taib Abu Bakar	BN (UMNO)	Onn Hafiz Ghazi	UMNO	Not contesting.		Azlisham Azhar	PAS	Shahruddin Md Salleh	PEJUANG
P151	Simpang Renggam	N27	Layang-Layang	Onn Hafiz Ghazi	BN (UMNO)	Abd Mutalip Abd Rahim	UMNO	Maszlee Malik	PKR	Alagenthiran Krishnan	BERSATU	Ahmad Shafiq Othman	PEJUANG
P152	Kluang	N28	Mengkibol	Chew Chong Sin	PH (DAP)	Kelly Chye Pei Yee	MCA	Chew Chong Sin	DAP	Kevin Wong Chan Giap	BERSATU	None	
P152	Kluang	N29	Mahkota	Muhamad Said Jonit	PH (PKR)	Sharifah Azizah Syed Zain	UMNO	Muhammad Taqiuddin Cheman	AMANAH	Mohamad Nor Lingan	BERSATU	Mohamed Noor Suleiman	WARISAN
P153	Sembrong	N30	Paloh	Sheikh Umar Bagharib Ali	PH (DAP)	Lee Ting Han	MCA	Sheikh Umar Bagharib Ali	DAP	Selvendran Velu	PAS	Aminuddin Johari	PEJUANG
P153	Sembrong	N31	Kahang	Vidyananthan Ramanadhan	BN (MIC)	Vidyananthan Ramanadhan	MIC	Rahani Banu Abd Rahman Krishnan	AMANAH	Daud Yusof	BERSATU	Rosdi Amir	PEJUANG
P154	Mersing	N32	Endau	Alwiyah Talib (Note: Alwiyah Talib contested the general election as a Barisan Nasional (UMNO) candidate, officially switch allegiance to Pakatan Harapan (BERSATU) on 25 November 2018 with other two assemblyman.)	PN (BERSATU)	Mohd Youzaimi Yusof	UMNO	Mohamad Fakrulrazi Mahmud	AMANAH	Alwiyah Talib	BERSATU	Mohd Noorhisyam Ibrahim	PEJUANG
P154	Mersing	N32	Endau	Alwiyah Talib	PN (BERSATU)	Mohd Youzaimi Yusof	UMNO	Mohamad Fakrulrazi Mahmud	AMANAH	Alwiyah Talib	BERSATU	Ismail Don	IND
P154	Mersing	N33	Tenggaroh	Raven Kumar Krishnasamy	BN (MIC)	Raven Kumar Krishnasamy	MIC	Zulinah A. Johari	PKR	Roslan Nikmat	PAS	Mohd Firdaus Abd Rahman	PEJUANG
P155	Tenggara	N34	Panti	Hahasrin Hashim	BN (UMNO)	Hahasrin Hashim	UMNO	Ahmad Daniel Shahrudin	AMANAH	Hassan Rasid	BERSATU	Ahmade Mohd Din	PEJUANG
P155	Tenggara	N35	Pasir Raja	Rashidah Ismail	BN (UMNO)	Rashidah Ismail	UMNO	Mohd Fakhruddin Moslim	PKR	Jawahir Husein	BERSATU	Mohd Yusri Yusof	PEJUANG
P156	Kota Tinggi	N36	Sedili	Rasman Ithnain (Note: Rasman Ithnain contested the general election as a Barisan Nasional (UMNO) candidate, officially switch allegiance to Pakatan Harapan (BERSATU) on 19 November 2018.)	PN (BERSATU)	Muszaidi Makmor	UMNO	Mat Khairy Samsudin	AMANAH	Hasnol Hadi Sebalas	BERSATU	Tariq Ismail Mustafa	PEJUANG
P156	Kota Tinggi	N37	Johor Lama	Rosleli Jahari (Note: Rosleli Jahari contested the general election as a Barisan Nasional (UMNO) candidate, officially switch allegiance to Pakatan Harapan (BERSATU) on 19 November 2018.)	PN (BERSATU)	Norlizah Noh	UMNO	Omar Mokhtar Abdul Manap	PKR	Alias Rasman	BERSATU	Shukor Ahmad	PEJUANG
P157	Pengerang	N38	Penawar	Sharifah Azizah Syed Zain	BN (UMNO)	Fauziah Misri	UMNO	Norazila Sanip	AMANAH	Mohd Faizal Asmar	BERSATU	Rahmattullah Kamilin	PEJUANG
P157	Pengerang	N39	Tanjung Surat	Syed Sis Abdul Rahman	BN (UMNO)	Aznan Tamin	UMNO	Rosman Tahir	PKR	Selamat Ujud	PAS	Samat Atan	PEJUANG
P158	Tebrau	N40	Tiram	Gopalakrishnan Subramaniam	PH (PKR)	Azizul Bachok	UMNO	Gopalakrishnan Subramaniam	PKR	Karim Deraman	PAS	Azmi Ali	PBM
P158	Tebrau	N40	Tiram	Gopalakrishnan Subramaniam	PH (PKR)	Azizul Bachok	UMNO	Gopalakrishnan Subramaniam	PKR	Karim Deraman	PAS	Abdul Aziz Harun	PEJUANG
P158	Tebrau	N40	Tiram	Gopalakrishnan Subramaniam	PH (PKR)	Azizul Bachok	UMNO	Gopalakrishnan Subramaniam	PKR	Karim Deraman	PAS	Bala Sundaram Perumal	IND
P158	Tebrau	N40	Tiram	Gopalakrishnan Subramaniam	PH (PKR)	Azizul Bachok	UMNO	Gopalakrishnan Subramaniam	PKR	Karim Deraman	PAS	Jayasangkar Jeraman	IND
P158	Tebrau	N41	Puteri Wangsa	Mazlan Bujang	PN (BERSATU)	Ng Yew Aik	MCA	Not contesting.		Loh Kah Yong	GERAKAN	Amira Aisya Abdul Aziz	MUDA
P158	Tebrau	N41	Puteri Wangsa	Mazlan Bujang	PN (BERSATU)	Ng Yew Aik	MCA	Not contesting.		Loh Kah Yong	GERAKAN	Khairil Anwar Razali	PEJUANG
P158	Tebrau	N41	Puteri Wangsa	Mazlan Bujang	PN (BERSATU)	Ng Yew Aik	MCA	Not contesting.		Loh Kah Yong	GERAKAN	Steven Choong Shiau Yoon	PBM
P158	Tebrau	N41	Puteri Wangsa	Mazlan Bujang	PN (BERSATU)	Ng Yew Aik	MCA	Not contesting.		Loh Kah Yong	GERAKAN	Adzrin Adam	IND
P159	Pasir Gudang	N42	Johor Jaya	Liow Cai Tung	PH (DAP)	Chan San San	MCA	Liow Cai Tung	DAP	Ker Ching Sheng	GERAKAN	Victor Chen Hain Kai	WARISAN
P159	Pasir Gudang	N43	Permas	Che Zakaria Mohd. Salleh	PN (BERSATU)	Baharudin Mohd Taib	UMNO	Syed Othman Abdullah	AMANAH	Tazul Arifin Nasri	BERSATU	Mohamed Ridza Busu	WARISAN
P159	Pasir Gudang	N43	Permas	Che Zakaria Mohd. Salleh	PN (BERSATU)	Baharudin Mohd Taib	UMNO	Syed Othman Abdullah	AMANAH	Tazul Arifin Nasri	BERSATU	Mahaya Ahad	PEJUANG
P160	Johor Bahru	N44	Larkin	Mohammad Izhar Ahmad	PN (BERSATU)	Mohd Hairi Mad Shah	UMNO	Zamil Najwah Arbain	PKR	Zulkifli Bujang	BERSATU	Rasid Abu Bakar	MUDA
P160	Johor Bahru	N44	Larkin	Mohammad Izhar Ahmad	PN (BERSATU)	Mohd Hairi Mad Shah	UMNO	Zamil Najwah Arbain	PKR	Zulkifli Bujang	BERSATU	Mohamad Riadz Mohamad Hashim	PEJUANG
P160	Johor Bahru	N44	Larkin	Mohammad Izhar Ahmad	PN (BERSATU)	Mohd Hairi Mad Shah	UMNO	Zamil Najwah Arbain	PKR	Zulkifli Bujang	BERSATU	Norramadan Buan	IND
P160	Johor Bahru	N45	Stulang	Andrew Chen Kah Eng	PH (DAP)	Ang Boon Heng	MCA	Andrew Chen Kah Eng	DAP	Yap Chiang Youis	GERAKAN	Saiful Bahari Sahari	PBM
P160	Johor Bahru	N45	Stulang	Andrew Chen Kah Eng	PH (DAP)	Ang Boon Heng	MCA	Andrew Chen Kah Eng	DAP	Yap Chiang Youis	GERAKAN	Moharam Baharom	IND
P161	Pulai	N46	Perling	Cheo Yee How	PH (DAP)	Tan Hiang Kee	MCA	Liew Chin Tong	DAP	Koo Shiaw Lee	GERAKAN	None	
P161	Pulai	N47	Kempas	Osman Sapian (died in office)	PN (BERSATU)	Ramlee Bohani	UMNO	Napsiah Khamis Maharan	PKR	Nur Faizal Abdullah	BERSATU	Nornekman Osman	PEJUANG
P161	Pulai	N47	Kempas	Osman Sapian (died in office)	PN (BERSATU)	Ramlee Bohani	UMNO	Napsiah Khamis Maharan	PKR	Nur Faizal Abdullah	BERSATU	Azwan Abd Rahman	IND
P161	Pulai	N47	Kempas	Osman Sapian (died in office)	PN (BERSATU)	Ramlee Bohani	UMNO	Napsiah Khamis Maharan	PKR	Nur Faizal Abdullah	BERSATU	Suhimi A. Rahman	IND
P161	Pulai	N47	Kempas	Osman Sapian (died in office)	PN (BERSATU)	Ramlee Bohani	UMNO	Napsiah Khamis Maharan	PKR	Nur Faizal Abdullah	BERSATU	Tok Hambali	IND
P162	Iskandar Puteri	N48	Skudai	Tan Hong Pin	PH (DAP)	Lim Soon Hai	MCA	Marina Ibrahim	DAP	Khoo Kong Ek	BERSATU	None	
P162	Iskandar Puteri	N49	Kota Iskandar	Dzulkefly Ahmad	PH (AMANAH)	Pandak Ahmad	UMNO	Dzulkefly Ahmad	AMANAH	Shamsuddin Ismail	BERSATU	Zaini Abu Bakar	PEJUANG
P162	Iskandar Puteri	N49	Kota Iskandar	Dzulkefly Ahmad	PH (AMANAH)	Pandak Ahmad	UMNO	Dzulkefly Ahmad	AMANAH	Shamsuddin Ismail	BERSATU	Arangkannal Rajoo	PSM
P163	Kulai	N50	Bukit Permai	Tosrin Jarvanthi	PN (BERSATU)	Mohd Jafni Md Shukor	UMNO	Not contesting.		Tosrin Jarvanthi	BERSATU	Mokhtar Abdul Wahab	PEJUANG
P163	Kulai	N50	Bukit Permai	Tosrin Jarvanthi	PN (BERSATU)	Mohd Jafni Md Shukor	UMNO	Not contesting.		Tosrin Jarvanthi	BERSATU	Azrol Rahani	MUDA
P163	Kulai	N51	Bukit Batu	Jimmy Puah Wee Tse	PH (PKR)	Supayyah Solaimuthu	MIC	Arthur Chong Sen Sern	PKR	Tan Heng Choon	GERAKAN	Lee Ming Wen	WARISAN
P163	Kulai	N52	Senai	Alan Tee Boon Tsong	PH (DAP)	Shen Poh Kuan	MCA	Wong Bor Yang	DAP	Yeo Kwee Kwang	BERSATU	None	
P164	Pontian	N53	Benut	Hasni Mohammad	BN (UMNO)	Hasni Mohammad	UMNO	Haniff Hosman	PKR	Isa Abd. Hamid	BERSATU	Iskandar Noor Ibrahim	PEJUANG
P164	Pontian	N54	Pulai Sebatang	Muhammad Taqiuddin Cheman	PH (AMANAH)	Hasrunizah Hassan	UMNO	Suhaizan Kayat	AMANAH	Abdullah Husin	PAS	Abdul Rashid Abdul Hadi	PEJUANG
P165	Tanjung Piai	N55	Pekan Nanas	Yeo Tung Siong	PH (DAP)	Tan Eng Meng	MCA	Yeo Tung Siong	DAP	Tan Chin Hock	GERAKAN	Hishamuddin Busri	WARISAN
P165	Tanjung Piai	N56	Kukup	Md Othman Yusof	BN (UMNO)	Jefridin Atan	UMNO	Mohd Zaiful Bakri	PKR	Mahahtir Iskandar Muhammad	BERSATU	Zamzam Hashim	PEJUANG

== Results ==
Party or alliance		Votes	%	Seats	+/–
Barisan Nasional	United Malays National Organisation	406,997	29.26	33	+19
Barisan Nasional	Malaysian Chinese Association	154,922	11.14	4	+4
Barisan Nasional	Malaysian Indian Congress	37,834	2.72	3	+1
Barisan Nasional	Total	599,753	43.11	40	+24
Pakatan Harapan	Democratic Action Party	181,455	13.04	10	–4
Pakatan Harapan	National Trust Party	103,514	7.44	1	–5
Pakatan Harapan	People's Justice Party	82,556	5.93	1	–6
Pakatan Harapan	Total	367,525	26.42	12	–15
Malaysian United Democratic Alliance		48,072	3.46	1	New
Perikatan Nasional	Malaysian United Indigenous Party	196,078	14.09	2	–9
Perikatan Nasional	Pan-Malaysian Islamic Party	97,552	7.01	1	0
Perikatan Nasional	Parti Gerakan Rakyat Malaysia	40,827	2.93	0	0
Perikatan Nasional	Total	334,457	24.04	3	–9
Homeland Fighter's Party		18,692	1.34	0	New
Heritage Party		6,532	0.47	0	New
Parti Bangsa Malaysia		4,880	0.35	0	New
Socialist Party of Malaysia		997	0.07	0	New
Parti Bumiputera Perkasa Malaysia		247	0.02	0	New
Independents		10,007	0.72	0	0
Total		1,391,162	100.00	56	0
Valid votes		1,391,162	97.52		
Invalid/blank votes		35,411	2.48		
Total votes		1,426,573	100.00		
Registered voters/turnout		2,597,662	54.92		
Source: SPR

↓
Barisan Nasional government (40)			Pakatan Harapan-led opposition (16)*
40			13				3
Barisan Nasional			Pakatan Harapan+				Perikatan Nasional
33	4	3	10	1	1	1	2	1
UMNO	MCA	MIC	DAP	AMANAH	PKR	MUDA	BERSATU	PAS
Johor State Legislative Assembly, 12 March 2022 (56 seats)

=== By parliamentary constituency ===
Barisan Nasional won 20 of 26 parliamentary constituency by average percentages.

No.	Constituency	Barisan Nasional	Pakatan Harapan	Perikatan Nasional	Member of Parliament
P140	Segamat	47.29%	31.84%	20.26%	Edmund Santhara Kumar Ramanaidu
P141	Sekijang	45.73%	29.18%	23.78%	Natrah Ismail
P142	Labis	48.11%	27.85%	21.90%	Pang Hok Liong
P143	Pagoh	36.59%	19.30%	37.66%	Muhyiddin Yassin
P144	Ledang	40.95%	36.49%	26.10%	Syed Ibrahim Syed Noh
P145	Bakri	29.01%	47.02%	23.99%	Yeo Bee Yin
P146	Muar	36.73%	25.34%	34.47%	Syed Saddiq Syed Abdul Rahman
P147	Parit Sulong	52.72%	25.97%	31.06%	Noraini Ahmad
P148	Ayer Hitam	57.29%	23.09%	18.99%	Wee Ka Siong
P149	Sri Gading	44.06%	35.15%	26.50%	Shahruddin Md Salleh
P150	Batu Pahat	39.44%	31.10%	26.22%	Mohd Rashid Hasnon
P151	Simpang Renggam	55.82%	26.22%	16.17%	Maszlee Malik
P152	Kluang	37.36%	45.25%	16.63%	Wong Shu Qi
P153	Sembrong	58.87%	23.22%	16.47%	Hishammuddin Hussein
P154	Mersing	42.28%	7.36%	49.13%	Abd Latiff Ahmad
P155	Tenggara	57.75%	7.00%	29.27%	Adham Baba
P156	Kota Tinggi	62.04%	4.38%	32.06%	Halimah Mohamed Sadique
P157	Pengerang	66.82%	4.59%	26.65%	Azalina Othman Said
P158	Tebrau	35.22%	32.73%	24.11%	Steven Choong Shiau Yoon
P159	Pasir Gudang	39.80%	33.82%	22.65%	Hassan Abdul Karim
P160	Johor Bahru	38.16%	37.24%	19.54%	Akmal Nasrullah Mohd Nasir
P161	Pulai	35.58%	33.43%	22.46%	Salahuddin Ayub
P162	Iskandar Puteri	32.41%	45.81%	24.95%	Lim Kit Siang
P163	Kulai	39.41%	40.08%	17.70%	Teo Nie Ching
P164	Pontian	56.57%	15.81%	26.55%	Ahmad Maslan
P165	Tanjung Piai	55.95%	22.96%	15.32%	Wee Jeck Seng

=== Seats that changed allegiance ===
No.	Seat	Previous Party (2018)	Current Party (2022)
N03	Pemanis	Pakatan Harapan (PKR)	Barisan Nasional (UMNO)
N04	Kemelah	Pakatan Harapan (Amanah)	Barisan Nasional (MIC)
N05	Tenang	Pakatan Harapan (Bersatu)	Barisan Nasional (UMNO)
N06	Bekok	Pakatan Harapan (DAP)	Barisan Nasional (MCA)
N07	Bukit Kepong	Pakatan Harapan (Bersatu)	Perikatan Nasional (Bersatu)
N08	Bukit Pasir	PAS	Barisan Nasional (UMNO)
N09	Gambir	Pakatan Harapan (Bersatu)	Barisan Nasional (UMNO)
N11	Serom	Pakatan Harapan (Amanah)	Barisan Nasional (UMNO)
N14	Bukit Naning	Pakatan Harapan (PKR)	Barisan Nasional (UMNO)
N15	Maharani	Pakatan Harapan (Amanah)	Perikatan Nasional (PAS)
N17	Semerah	Pakatan Harapan (PKR)	Barisan Nasional (UMNO)
N19	Yong Peng	Pakatan Harapan (DAP)	Barisan Nasional (MCA)
N21	Parit Yaani	Pakatan Harapan (Amanah)	Barisan Nasional (UMNO)
N24	Senggarang	Pakatan Harapan (Amanah)	Barisan Nasional (UMNO)
N29	Mahkota	Pakatan Harapan (Amanah)	Barisan Nasional (UMNO)
N30	Paloh	Pakatan Harapan (DAP)	Barisan Nasional (MCA)
N32	Endau	Barisan Nasional (UMNO)	Perikatan Nasional (Bersatu)
N40	Tiram	Pakatan Harapan (PKR)	Barisan Nasional (UMNO)
N41	Puteri Wangsa	Pakatan Harapan (Bersatu)	MUDA
N43	Permas	Pakatan Harapan (Bersatu)	Barisan Nasional (UMNO)
N44	Larkin	Pakatan Harapan (Bersatu)	Barisan Nasional (UMNO)
N47	Kempas	Pakatan Harapan (Bersatu)	Barisan Nasional (UMNO)
N49	Kota Iskandar	Pakatan Harapan (Amanah)	Barisan Nasional (UMNO)
N50	Bukit Permai	Pakatan Harapan (Bersatu)	Barisan Nasional (UMNO)
N54	Pulai Sebatang	Pakatan Harapan (Amanah)	Barisan Nasional (UMNO)
N55	Pekan Nanas	Pakatan Harapan (DAP)	Barisan Nasional (MCA)

== Election pendulum ==
2022 Johor state election

GOVERNMENT SEATS
Marginal
Bukit Pasir	Mohamad Fadzli Mohamed Salleh	UMNO	32.11
Bukit Naning	Mohd. Fuad Tukirin	UMNO	37.37
Serom	Khairin-Nisa Ismail @ Md. On	UMNO	37.56
Parit Yaani	Mohamad Najib Samuri	UMNO	38.56
Kempas	Ramlee Bohani	UMNO	38.92
Tiram	Azizul Bachok	UMNO	39.59
Permas	Baharudin Mohamed Taib	UMNO	40.74
Kota Iskandar	Pandak Ahmad	UMNO	40.79
Kemelah	Saraswati Nallathamby	MIC	41.13
Larkin	Mohd. Hairi Mad Shah	UMNO	41.77
Tenang	Haslinda Salleh	UMNO	44.91
Semerah	Mohd. Fared Mohamed Khalid	UMNO	44.93
Senggarang	Mohd. Yusla Ismail	UMNO	45.11
Gambir	Sahrihan Jani	UMNO	45.48
Sungai Balang	Selamat Takim	UMNO	45.57
Mahkota	Sharifah Azizah Syed Zain	UMNO	46.57
Bukit Permai	Mohd. Jafni Md. Shukor	UMNO	48.36
Rengit	Dr. Mohd. Puad Zarkashi	UMNO	48.91
Tenggaroh	Raven Kumar S. Krishnasamy	MIC	49.10
Parit Raja	Nor Rashidah Ramli	UMNO	49.57
Pemanis	Anuar Abd. Manap	UMNO	49.81
Pekan Nanas	Tan Eng Meng	MCA	50.49
Pulai Sebatang	Hasrunizah Hassan	UMNO	50.56
Bekok	Tan Chong	MCA	51.31
Yong Peng	Ling Tian Soon	MCA	51.90
Layang-Layang	Abd. Mutalip Abd. Rahim	UMNO	55.00
Paloh	Lee Ting Han	MCA	55.05
Fairly safe
Machap	Onn Hafiz Ghazi	UMNO	56.64
Buloh Kasap	Zahari Sarip	UMNO	56.96
Panti	Hahasrin Hashim	UMNO	57.29
Pasir Raja	Rashidah Ismail	UMNO	58.21
Safe
Kukup	Jefridin Atan	UMNO	60.37
Sri Medan	Zulkurnain Kamisan	UMNO	60.52
Johor Lama	Norlizah Noh	UMNO	60.56
Sedili	Muszaide Makmor	UMNO	62.25
Kahang	Vidyanathan Ramanadhan	MIC	62.69
Benut	Ir. Hasni Mohammad	UMNO	63.08
Semarang	Samsol Bari Jamali	UMNO	63.21
Tanjung Surat	Aznan Tamin	UMNO	66.97
Penawar	Fauziah Misri	UMNO	66.98

NON-GOVERNMENT SEATS
Marginal
Maharani	Abdul Aziz Talib	PAS	35.97
Bukit Batu	Arthur Chiong Sen Sern	PKR	39.20
Tangkak	Eric Ee Chin Li	DAP	40.03
Jementah	Ng Kor Sim	DAP	40.92
Simpang Jeram	Salahuddin Ayub	AMANAH	40.94
Johor Jaya	Liow Cai Tung	DAP	41.74
Perling	Liew Chin Tong	DAP	42.50
Puteri Wangsa	Amira Aisya Abd. Aziz	MUDA	43.22
Bukit Kepong	Dr. Sahruddin Jamal	BERSATU	44.27
Stulang	Andrew Chen Kah Eng	DAP	44.84
Senai	Wong Bor Yang	DAP	51.75
Penggaram	Gan Peck Cheng	DAP	53.67
Endau	Alwiyah Talib	BERSATU	55.48
Fairly safe
Mengkibol	Chew Chong Sin	DAP	57.50
Skudai	Marina Ibrahim	DAP	58.53
Safe
Bentayan	Ng Yak Howe	DAP	64.53

== Departing incumbents ==
The following members of the 14th State Legislative Assembly will not renew their term.

No.	State constituencies	Names	Political parties	Date confirmed	First elected	Reasons
N11	Serom	Faizul Amri Adnan	PH (PKR)	22 July 2020	2018	Not seeking re-election
N47	Kempas	Osman Sapian	PN (BERSATU)	21 December 2021	1999	Died in office
N19	Yong Peng	Chew Peck Choo	PH (DAP)	20 January 2022	2013	Not seeking re-election
N41	Puteri Wangsa	Mazlan Bujang	PN (BERSATU)	20 January 2022	2018	Not seeking re-election
N02	Jementah	Tan Chen Choon	PH (DAP)	24 January 2022	2013	Not seeking re-election
N09	Gambir	Muhyiddin Yassin (Note: Previously, Muhyiddin was also the MLA for Bukit Serampang constituency from 1986 to 1995.)	PN (BERSATU)	25 January 2022	2018	Not seeking re-election
N44	Larkin	Mohammad Izhar Ahmad	PN (BERSATU)	29 January 2022	2018	Not seeking re-election
N48	Skudai	Tan Hong Pin	PH (DAP)	9 February 2022	2013	Transferred to Bakri
N51	Bukit Batu	Jimmy Puah Wee Tse	PH (PKR)	14 February 2022	2013	Not nominated by the party
N06	Bekok	Ramakrishnan Suppiah	PH (DAP)	19 February 2022	2018	Not nominated by the party
N46	Perling	Cheo Yee How	PH (DAP)	19 February 2022	2018	Not nominated by the party
N29	Mahkota	Muhammad Said Jonit	PH (PKR)	19 February 2022	2018	Not nominated by the party
N16	Sungai Balang	Zaiton Ismail	BN (UMNO)	24 February 2022	2013	Not nominated by the party
N25	Rengit	Ayub Jamil	BN (UMNO)	24 February 2022	2004	Not nominated by the party
N26	Machap	Abd. Taib Abu Bakar	BN (UMNO)	24 February 2022	2013	Not nominated by the party
N56	Kukup	Md Othman Yusof	BN (UMNO)	24 February 2022	2018	Not nominated by the party
N36	Sedili	Rasman Ithnain	PN (BERSATU)	24 February 2022	2008	Not nominated by the party
N37	Johor Lama	Rosleli Jahari	PN (BERSATU)	24 February 2022	2018	Not nominated by the party
N43	Permas	Che Zakaria Mohd. Salleh	PN (BERSATU)	24 February 2022	2018	Not nominated by the party
N39	Tanjung Surat	Syed Sis Abdul Rahman	BN (UMNO)	26 February 2022	2013	Not nominated by the party

== Controversies and issues ==
On 27 February 2022, Health Minister Khairy Jamaluddin said he will review a video depicting former prime minister Najib Razak purportedly violating Covid-19 standard operating procedure (SOP) during a campaign visit in Perling.

On 10 March 2022, Khairy revealed that his ministry had issued 42 compound notices for the violation of SOPs during the campaign period for the Johor election, including five to Najib.

== Aftermath ==
Onn Hafiz Ghazi, elected MLA for Machap, were sworn in as the new Menteri Besar of Johor on 15 March, replacing Hasni. The EXCO members were sworn in on 26 March.

Even though the results of the Malaysian general election in November 2022 saw the historic formation of federal government consisting of the alliance between Pakatan Harapan and Barisan Nasional, the status quo is not changed for the government in Johor. As of January 2023, PH is still an opposition party in the state assembly, although according to Johor PH chairman, the relationship between PH and BN is 'good'.

The elected MLA for Simpang Jeram, Salahuddin Ayub (who is also the MP for Pulai, Johor PH chairman, and then Minister of Domestic Trade and Cost of Living) died on 23 July 2023, necessitating the 2023 Simpang Jeram by-election for the state seat (and the 2023 Pulai by-election for the federal seat). The by-election saw the first collaboration between BN and PH at Johor state level, as BN acceded to PH to put its candidate there, as well as campaigning together. Both seats were retained by PH in the by-election.

After MUDA's president Syed Saddiq Syed Abdul Rahman announced his party's support withdrawal of the unity government at federal level on 10 September 2023 in protest of UMNO and BN president Zahid Hamidi recent discharge not amounting to an acquittal (DNAA) of his 47 court cases, the sole MUDA representative at Johor assembly, Puteri Wangsa's MLA Amira Aisya Abdul Aziz announced the day after that she also withdraws from the state government coalition and will be in the opposition bloc (now known as Balancer Bloc in the Johor assembly), though not in coalition with PN.

== See also ==
- Politics of Malaysia
- List of political parties in Malaysia
