= Tanjong Puteri (state constituency) =

Political subdivision in Malaysia

Johor constituency

Defunct state constituency
- Legislature: Johor State Legislative Assembly
- Constituency created: 1958
- Constituency abolished: 2018
- First contested: 1959
- Last contested: 2013

Tanjong Puteri is a former state constituency in Johor, Malaysia, that is represented in the Johor State Legislative Assembly since 1959 until 2018.

The state constituency was first contested in 1959 and is mandated to return a single Assemblyman to the Johor State Legislative Assembly under the first-past-the-post voting system.

== History ==
=== Historical boundaries ===
State Constituency	Area				
State Constituency	1974	1984	1994	2003	2018
Tanjong Puteri	Bukit Chagar; Kampung Dato Sulaiman Menteri; Kebun Teh; Larkin; Pasir Pelangi	Kampung Majidee Baru; Taman Majidee; Taman Melodies; Tanjong Puteri; Wadi Hana	Kampung Majidee Baru; Pandan; Taman Majidee; Taman Melodies; Tanjong Puteri	Bandar Baru Uda; Kebun Teh; Larkin; Taman Majidee; Tanjong Puteri	

=== Representation history ===
Members of the Legislative Assembly for Tanjong Puteri
Assembly	No	Years	Member	Party
Constituency created
Tanjong Petri
1st	N24	1959–1964	Chu Choon Yong (祝俊雄)	LPM (Socialist Party)
2nd	N24	1964–1969	Ooyub Abdul Manas	Alliance (UMNO)
3th	N24	1969–1971	Abdul Hamid Rahmat	Alliance (UMNO)
4th	N32	1971–1974	Abdul Hamid Rahmat	BN (UMNO)
5th	N32	1974–1978	Law Lai Heng (吳來興)	BN (MCA)
6th	N32	1978–1982	Woon See Chin (云時進)	BN (MCA)
Tanjong Puteri
7th	N31	1986–1988	Mohd Yunos Sulaiman	BN (UMNO)
7th	N31	1988	Mohd Yunos Sulaiman	BN (UMNO)
8th	N31	1990–1995	Mohamad Kasbi	BN (UMNO)
9th	N33	1995–1999	Mohamad Kasbi	BN (UMNO)
10th	N33	1999–2004	Mohamad Kasbi	BN (UMNO)
11th	N44	2004–2008	Ali Mohamed	BN (UMNO)
12th	N44	2008–2013	Adam Sumiru	BN (UMNO)
13th	N44	2013–2018	Adam Sumiru	BN (UMNO)
Constituency abolished, renamed to Larkin

== Election results ==
Johor state election, 2018: Larkin
Party	Candidate	Votes	%
PKR	Mohd Izhar Ahmad	25,012	56.00
BN	Yahya Ja'afar	16,422	36.77
PAS	Zakiah Tukirin	3,233	7.24
Total valid votes		44,667	100.00
Total rejected ballots		495	
Unreturned ballots		179	
Turnout		45,341	81.17
Registered electors		55,858	
Majority		8,590	19.23
This is a new created constituency.
Source(s) The Star
