= Abdul Taib Abu Bakar =

Malaysian politician

Haji Abdul Taib Abu Bakar AMN PIS

Member of the Johor State Legislative Assembly for Machap
- In office 5 May 2013 – 12 March 2022
- Preceded by: Abdul Hamid Abdul Rahman (BN–UMNO)
- Succeeded by: Onn Hafiz Ghazi (BN–UMNO)
- Majority: 3,902 (2013); 404 (2018)

Personal details
- Born: Abdul Taib bin Abu Bakar Malaysia
- Party: United Malays National Organisation (UMNO)
- Other political affiliations: Barisan Nasional (BN)
- Occupation: Politician

Abdul Taib bin Abu Bakar is a Malaysian politician who served as Member of the Johor State Legislative Assembly (MLA) for Machap from May 2013 to March 2022. He is a member of the United Malays National Organisation (UMNO), a component party of the Barisan Nasional (BN) coalition.

== Election results ==
Johor State Legislative Assembly
Year	Constituency	Candidate	Votes	Pct	Opponent(s)	Votes	Pct	Ballots cast	Majority	Turnout
2013	Machap	Abdul Taib Abu Bakar (UMNO)	11,515	58.84%	Mohd Khalid Salekan (PAS)	7,613	38.90%	19,570	3,902	88.07%
2018	Machap	Abdul Taib Abu Bakar (UMNO)	9,375	46.93%	Ahmad Ahem (PKR)	8,971	44.91%	19,976	404	82.70%
2018	Machap	Abdul Taib Abu Bakar (UMNO)	9,375	46.93%	Azlisham Azahar (PAS)	1,630	8.16%	19,976	404	82.70%

== Honours ==
- Malaysia
  - Member of the Order of the Defender of the Realm (AMN) (2014)
- Johor
  - Sultan Ibrahim Medal (PIS)
