= Mazlan Bujang =

Malaysian politician

Haji Mazlan Bujang
- مصلان بوجڠ

Exco roles (Johor)
- 2018–2019: Chairman of the Public Works, Infrastructure and Transportation
- 2020–2022: Chairman of the Education, Information, Heritage and Culture

Faction represented in Johor State Legislative Assembly
- 2018–2020: Pakatan Harapan
- 2020: Malaysian United Indigenous Party
- 2020–2022: Perikatan Nasional

Personal details
- Born: Johor, Malaysia
- Citizenship: Malaysian
- Party: Malaysian United Indigenous Party (BERSATU) (2018-2022); Independent (2022-2026); Malaysian Islamic Party (PAS) (2026-present)
- Other political affiliations: Pakatan Harapan (PH) (2018-2020); Perikatan Nasional (PN) (2020-2022); Perikatan Nasional (PN) (2026-)
- Relations: Maulizan Bujang (brother)
- Occupation: Politician

Mazlan bin Bujang is a Malaysian politician who served as Member of the Johor State Executive Council (EXCO) in the Pakatan Harapan (PH) and Barisan Nasional (BN) state administrations under Menteris Besar Osman Sapian and Hasni Mohammad from May 2018 to April 2019 and again from March 2020 to March 2022 as well as Member of the Johor State Legislative Assembly (MLA) for Puteri Wangsa from May 2018 to March 2022. He is an independent aligned with BN after leaving as a member, State Chairman of Johor and Division Chairman of Tebrau of the Malaysian United Indigenous Party (BERSATU), a component party of the Perikatan Nasional (PN) and previously PH coalitions. Currently he is a member of a Malaysian Islamic Party (PAS).

== Political career ==
Mazlan contested for the Puteri Wangsa Johor state seat as PH and BERSATU candidate and went on to win the state seat in the 2018 state election. He was later appointed as an EXCO member in the new PH state administration by new Menteri Besar Osman Sapian.

After Osman resigned as Johor Menteri Besar in April 2019, Osman also lost his position of State Chairman of BERSATU of Johor. Instead of new Menteri Besar Sahruddin Jamal who is also from BERSATU, Mazlan was instead appointed to the position even though he was not the Johor Menteri Besar. Sahruddin dropped and did not reappoint Mazlan as an EXCO member in his state administration after he took over as Johor Menteri Besar in April 2019.

President of BERSATU, Muhyiddin Yassin said there was no obstacle for those who did not serve as the Menteri Besar to be appointed to the position despite opposition from the Johor BERSATU division chairmen.

On 28 February 2020 during the Sheraton Move, PH and Sahruddin state administration collapsed and was replaced with the new BN state administration led by Menteri Besar Hasni Mohammad. He was reappointed back again as an EXCO member in the state administration. On 8 September 2020, Muhyiddin removed Mazlan from the position of the State Chairman of BERSATU of Johor and replaced him with Muhyiddin himself.

On 20 January 2022, he announced ahead that he would not seek for re-election as a Johor MLA in the 2022 Johor state election. On 27 January 2022, he announced that he resigned as Division Chairman of BERSATU of Tebrau and himself as well as 23 Tebrau BERSATU branch chairmen and action committee members decided to leave the party and throw their support behind Barisan Nasional (BN) and the leadership of Menteri Besar of Johor Hasni Mohammad with immediate effect to "give way to a more stable political environment and for the betterment of the Johor people in general".

He also claimed that he would carry on to serve the people without a political position and failure of the two previous Menteris Besar from Pakatan Harapan (PH) to lead the Johor state administration and the failure of both parties to nominate a better Johor Menteri Besar candidate as well as he felt disrespected of his removal as Johor BERSATU Chairman and the action of Muhyiddin of not sending any representative to the meetings he had chaired even though Muhyiddin had signed his promotion letter as the reasons as well. Muhyiddin then lashed out at Mazlan by asking where is his honour and sarcastically asked him to bring 200000 members to leave BERSATU as well.

== Election results ==
Johor State Legislative Assembly
Year	Constituency	Candidate	Votes	Pct	Opponent(s)	Votes	Pct	Ballots cast	Majority	Turnout
2018	N41 Puteri Wangsa	Mazlan Bujang (BERSATU)	37,545	70.25%	Abdul Aziz Tohak (UMNO)	12,586	23.55%	54,188	24,959	86.90%
2018	N41 Puteri Wangsa	Mazlan Bujang (BERSATU)	37,545	70.25%	Abdullah Hussin (PAS)	2,654	4.96%	54,188	24,959	86.90%
2018	N41 Puteri Wangsa	Mazlan Bujang (BERSATU)	37,545	70.25%	Lim Yak Hong (IND)	544	1.02%	54,188	24,959	86.90%
2018	N41 Puteri Wangsa	Mazlan Bujang (BERSATU)	37,545	70.25%	Ting Choon Chai (IND)	116	0.22%	54,188	24,959	86.90%
