= Larkin (state constituency) =

Political subdivision in Malaysia

Larkin (N44)
Johor constituency

State constituency
- Legislature: Johor State Legislative Assembly
MLA
Mohd Hairi Mad Shah
BN
- Constituency created: 2018
- First contested: 2018
- Last contested: 2026

Demographics
- Population (2020): 99,268
- Electors (2026): 76,662
- Area (km²): 20

Larkin is a state constituency in Johor, Malaysia, that is represented in the Johor State Legislative Assembly.

The state constituency was first contested in 2018 and is mandated to return a single Assemblyman to the Johor State Legislative Assembly under the first-past-the-post voting system.

== Demographics ==
As of 2020, Larkin has a population of 99,268 people.

Ethnic breakdown of Larkin's electorate as of 2026
1. Malay (63.6%)
2. Chinese (26.8%)
3. Indian (6.60%)
4. Other ethnicities (3.00%)

== History ==
=== Polling districts ===
According to the federal gazette issued on 2 July 2026, the Larkin constituency has a total of 23 polling districts.

State constituency	Polling District	Code	Location
Larkin (N44)	Bandar Baru Uda	160/44/01	SK Kompleks Uda
Larkin (N44)	Uda Malinja	160/44/02	SMK Bandar Baru Uda
Larkin (N44)	Jalan Datin Halimah	160/44/03	SJK (C) Foon Yew 4
Larkin (N44)	Kampong Ungku Mohsein	160/44/04	Sekolah Agama Kampung Aman; Dewan Kolej Universiti Islam Johor Sultan Ibrahim
Larkin (N44)	Kampong Melayu Majedee I	160/44/05	SK Mohd Khir Johari
Larkin (N44)	Kampong Melayu Majeede II	160/44/06	Dewan Kampung Melayu
Larkin (N44)	Stulang Baru	160/44/07	SMA Al Quran Waddin
Larkin (N44)	Sepakat	160/44/08	SA Dato' Abdullah Esa
Larkin (N44)	Taman Baru	160/44/09	SK Taman Suria
Larkin (N44)	Rumah Pangsa Larkin	166/44/10	SK Tanjung Puteri
Larkin (N44)	Larkin Jaya	160/44/11	SA Dato' Onn Jaafar
Larkin (N44)	Larkin	160/44/12	SK Larkin 1; SJK (C) Foon Yew 3
Larkin (N44)	Taman Majedee	160/44/13	SA Kebun Teh
Larkin (N44)	Taman Kebun Teh	160/44/14	SJK (C) Foon Yew 1
Larkin (N44)	Taman Melodies	160/44/15	Sekolah Sri Utama
Larkin (N44)	Taman Abad	160/44/16	SK Angkatan Tentera
Larkin (N44)	Abad Jaya 1	160/44/17	Pusat Jawatankuasa Penduduk Warga Unggul Taman Century; Dewan Raya Taman Century
Larkin (N44)	Taman Skudai Kanan	160/44/18	SK Bandar Uda 2
Larkin (N44)	Kampong Larkin Jaya	160/44/19	SMK Saint Joseph (B)
Larkin (N44)	Abad Jaya 2	160/44/20	Dewan Raya Taman Century; SK Angkatan tentera
Larkin (N44)	Uda Mahsuri	160/44/21	SA Bandar Baru Uda
Larkin (N44)	Ulu Ayer Molek	160/44/22	Dewan Seberguna Bakti Kastam
Larkin (N44)	Kebun Teh	160/44/23	SJK (C) Foon Yew 3

=== Representation history ===
Members of the Legislative Assembly for Larkin
Assembly	No	Years	Member	Party
Constituency renamed from Tanjong Puteri and Pengkalan Rinting
14th	N44	2018–2020	Mohd Izhar Ahmad	PH (BERSATU)
14th	N44	2020–2022	Mohd Izhar Ahmad	PN (BERSATU)
15th	N44	2022–2026	Mohd Hairi Mad Shah	BN (UMNO)
16th	N44	2026–present	Mohd Hairi Mad Shah	BN (UMNO)

== Election results ==
Johor state election, 2026
Party	Candidate	Votes	%	∆%
BN	Mohd Hairi Md Shah	33,882	67.47	▲25.70
PH	Suhaizan Kayat	13,600	27.08	▲27.08
BERSAMA	Norsinah Abu	2,737	5.45	▲5.45
Total valid votes		50,219	100.00	
Total rejected ballots		496		
Unreturned ballots		34		
Turnout		50,749	66.20	▲14.45
Registered electors		76,662		
Majority		20,282	40.39	▲24.31
BN hold		Swing		?

Johor state election, 2022
Party	Candidate	Votes	%	∆%
BN	Mohd Hairi Mad Shah	16,053	41.77	▲5.00
PN	Zulkifli Bujang	9,875	25.69	▲25.69
PKR	Zamil Najwah Arbain	6,448	16.78	▼39.22
MUDA	Rasid Abu Bakar	4,948	12.87	▲12.87
PEJUANG	Mohamad Riadz Mohamad Hashim	810	2.11	▲2.11
Independent	Norramadan Buan	299	0.78	▲0.78
Total valid votes		38,433	100.00	
Total rejected ballots		632		
Unreturned ballots		264		
Turnout		39,329	51.75	▼29.42
Registered electors		76,004		
Majority		6,178	16.08	▼3.15
BN gain from PKR		Swing		?

Johor state election, 2018
Party	Candidate	Votes	%
PKR	Mohd Izhar Ahmad	25,012	56.00
BN	Yahya Ja'afar	16,422	36.77
PAS	Zakiah Tukirin	3,233	7.24
Total valid votes		44,667	100.00
Total rejected ballots		495	
Unreturned ballots		179	
Turnout		45,341	81.17
Registered electors		55,858	
Majority		8,590	19.23
This is a new created constituency.
Source(s) The Star
