= Mohd Hairi Mad Shah =

Malaysian politician

Yang Berhormat Tuan Mohd Hairi Mad Shah MLA
- محمّد خيري مد شاه

Member of the Johor State Executive Council (Youth, Sports, Entrepreneur Development, Cooperatives & Human Resources : 26 March 2022–13 February 2024 & Youth, Sports, Entrepreneur Development & Cooperatives : since 13 February 2024)
- Incumbent
- Assumed office 13 February 2024
- Monarch: Ibrahim Iskandar
- Menteri Besar: Onn Hafiz Ghazi
- Preceded by: Himself
- Constituency: Larkin
- In office 26 March 2022 – 13 February 2024
- Monarch: Ibrahim Iskandar
- Menteri Besar: Onn Hafiz Ghazi
- Preceded by: Onn Hafiz Ghazi (Youth and Sports); Mohd Izhar Ahmad (Entrepreneur Development, Cooperatives and Human Resources)
- Succeeded by: Himself (Youth, Sports, Entrepreneur Development & Cooperatives); Lee Ting Han (Human Resources)
- Constituency: Larkin

Vice Youth Chief of the United Malays National Organisation
- Incumbent
- Assumed office 12 March 2023
- President: Ahmad Zahid Hamidi
- Youth Chief: Muhamad Akmal Saleh
- Preceded by: Shahril Sufian Hamdan

Member of the Johor State Legislative Assembly for Larkin
- Incumbent
- Assumed office 12 March 2022
- Preceded by: Mohd Izhar Ahmad (PH–BERSATU)
- Majority: 6,178 (2022)

Personal details
- Born: 6 May 1984 (age 42) Johor Bahru, Johor, Malaysia
- Citizenship: Malaysia
- Party: United Malays National Organisation (UMNO)
- Other political affiliations: Barisan Nasional (BN)
- Education: Sekolah Menengah Kebangsaan Dato' Jaafar
- Alma mater: Universiti Malaysia Pahang
- Occupation: Politician

Mohd Hairi bin Mad Shah (Jawi: محمد خيري مد شاه, Malay pronunciation: [mohamad hairi]; born 6 May 1984) is a Malaysian politician who has served as Member of the Johor State Executive Council (EXCO) in the Barisan Nasional (BN) state administration under Menteri Besar Onn Hafiz Ghazi as well as Member of the Johor State Legislative Assembly (MLA) for Larkin since March 2022. He is a member of the United Malays National Organisation (UMNO), a component party of the BN coalition. He has also served as the UMNO Youth Vice Chief since March 2023.

== Education ==
Mohd Hairi received his secondary education at Sekolah Menengah Kebangsaan Dato' Jaafar in Johor Bahru. He later obtained an Executive Bachelor and an Executive Master in Business Management from Universiti Malaysia Pahang (UMP).

== Political career ==
Mohd Hairi served as the UMNO Youth Chief for Johor Bahru and for the state of Johor from 2018 to 2023. In March 2023, he was elected as the UMNO Youth Vice Chief at the national level.

He contested the Larkin state seat in the 2022 Johor state election under the Barisan Nasional banner and won with a majority of 6,178 votes. He was subsequently appointed to the Johor State Executive Council, holding the Youth, Sports, Entrepreneur Development, Cooperatives and Human Resources portfolio (2022–2024) and later the Youth, Sports, Entrepreneur Development and Cooperatives portfolio (since 2024).

== Election results ==
Johor State Legislative Assembly
Year	Constituency	Candidate	Votes	Pct	Opponent(s)	Votes	Pct	Ballots cast	Majority	Turnout
2022	N44 Larkin	Mohd Hairi Mad Shah (UMNO)	16,053	41.77%	Zulkifli Bujang (BERSATU)	9,875	25.69%	38,433	6,178	50.57%
2022	N44 Larkin	Mohd Hairi Mad Shah (UMNO)	16,053	41.77%	Zamil Najwah Arbain (PKR)	6,448	16.78%	38,433	6,178	50.57%
2022	N44 Larkin	Mohd Hairi Mad Shah (UMNO)	16,053	41.77%	Rasid Abu Bakar (MUDA)	4,948	12.87%	38,433	6,178	50.57%
2022	N44 Larkin	Mohd Hairi Mad Shah (UMNO)	16,053	41.77%	Mohamad Riadz Mohamad Hashim (PEJUANG)	810	2.11%	38,433	6,178	50.57%
2022	N44 Larkin	Mohd Hairi Mad Shah (UMNO)	16,053	41.77%	Norramdan Buan (Independent)	299	0.78%	38,433	6,178	50.57%
