= Teow Chia Ling =

Malaysian politician

Puan Teow Chia Ling
- 张孳璘

City Councillor of the Johor Bahru City Council
- Incumbent
- Assumed office 2024
- Mayor: Dato' Haji Mohd Haffiz bin Haji Ahmad
- Zone: Setia Austin
- Preceded by: Zeti Zanariah binti Masiran

Chief of the Malaysian Chinese Association Youth Wing Tebrau Division
- Incumbent
- Assumed office 2022

Organizing Secretary of the National Malaysian Chinese Association Youth Wing
- Incumbent
- Assumed office 2023
- Chairman: Ling Tian Soon

City Councillor of the Pasir Gudang City Council
- In office 2021–2022
- Mayor: Dato' Haji Asman Shah bin Abd Rahman
- Zone: Kota Masai

Vice Chairman of the National Malaysian Chinese Association Youth Central Committee
- In office 2018–2021
- Chairman: Datuk Nicole Wong Siaw Ting

Personal details
- Citizenship: Malaysian
- Party: Malaysian Chinese Association (MCA)
- Other political affiliations: Barisan Nasional BN
- Occupation: Politician

Teow Chia Ling (Chinese: 张孳璘) is a Malaysian politician who serves as City Councillor of the Johor Bahru City Council, Chief of the Malaysian Chinese Association Youth Wing Tebrau Division and Organizing Secretary of the National Malaysian Chinese Association Youth Wing.

A member of the Malaysian Chinese Association (MCA), a component party of Barisan Nasional (BN), she has previously also held several administrative and political positions within the party and local government, such as Vice Chairman of the National Malaysian Chinese Association Youth Central Committee and City Councillor of the Pasir Gudang City Council.

== Political career ==
On 24 June 2026, Teow was announced as the Malaysian Chinese Association electoral candidate to contest the Puteri Wangsa seat in the 2026 Johor State Election.
