= Puteri Wangsa =

Political subdivision in Malaysia

Puteri Wangsa (N41)
Johor constituency
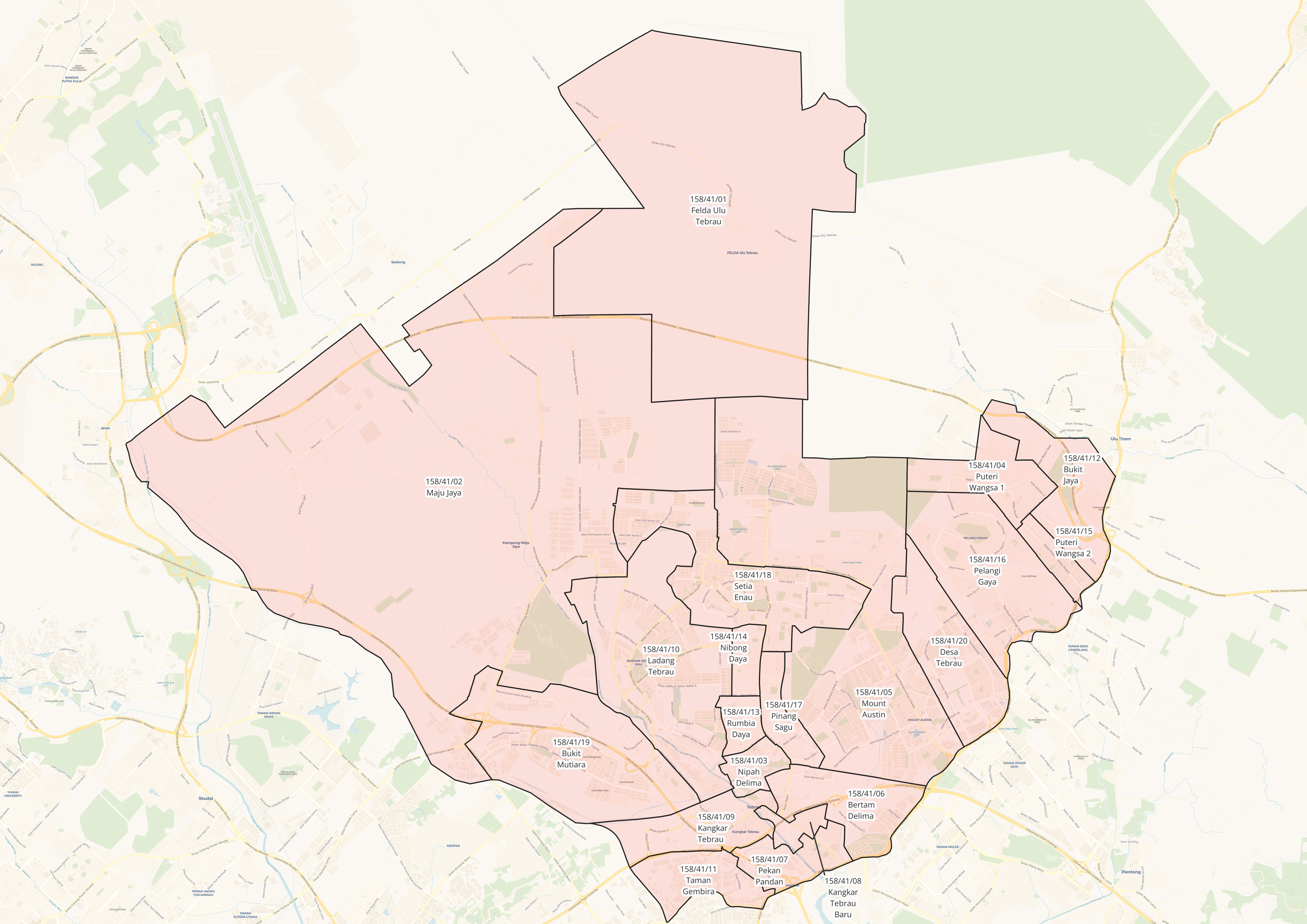

State constituency
- Legislature: Johor State Legislative Assembly
MLA
Maszlee Malik
PH
- Constituency created: 2003
- First contested: 2004
- Last contested: 2026

Demographics
- Population (2020): 272,211
- Electors (2026): 128,723
- Area (km²): 159

Puteri Wangsa is a state constituency in Johor, Malaysia, that is represented in the Johor State Legislative Assembly.

The state constituency was first contested in 2004 and is mandated to return a single Assemblyman to the Johor State Legislative Assembly under the first-past-the-post voting system.

== Demographics ==
As of 2020, Puteri Wangsa has a population of 272,211 people.

Ethnic breakdown of Puteri Wangsa's electorate as of 2026
1. Chinese (51.6%)
2. Malay (36.3%)
3. Indian (9.90%)
4. Other ethnicities (2.20%)

== History ==
=== Polling districts ===
According to the gazette issued on 2 July 2026, the Puteri Wangsa constituency has a total of 20 polling districts.

State constituency	Polling districts	Code	Location
Puteri Wangsa (N41)	FELDA Ulu Tebrau	158/41/01	SK (FELDA) Ulu Tebrau; SMK (FELDA) Ulu Tebrau
Puteri Wangsa (N41)	Maju Jaya	158/41/02	SK Kg. Maju Jaya
Puteri Wangsa (N41)	Nipah Delima	158/41/03	SK Taman Daya 2
Puteri Wangsa (N41)	Puteri Wangsa 1	158/41/04	SA Sabilul Muhtadin Taman Puteri Wangsa; Dewan Raya Taman Puteri Wangsa
Puteri Wangsa (N41)	Mount Austin	158/41/05	SMK Taman Mount Austin; SJK (C) Foon Yew 5
Puteri Wangsa (N41)	Bertam Delima	158/41/06	SK Taman Daya
Puteri Wangsa (N41)	Pekan Pandan	158/41/07	SJK (C) Pandan
Puteri Wangsa (N41)	Kangkar Tebrau Baru	158/41/08	SK Kangkar Tebrau
Puteri Wangsa (N41)	Kangkar Tebrau	158/41/09	SA Kangkar Tebrau
Puteri Wangsa (N41)	Ladang Tebrau	158/41/10	SJK (T) Ladang Tebrau
Puteri Wangsa (N41)	Taman Gembira	158/41/11	Balai Raya Taman Gembira
Puteri Wangsa (N41)	Bukit Jaya	158/41/12	SMK Puteri Wangsa
Puteri Wangsa (N41)	Rumbia Daya	158/41/13	SMK Taman Daya
Puteri Wangsa (N41)	Nibong Daya	158/41/14	SMK Tun Fatimah Hashim
Puteri Wangsa (N41)	Puteri Wangsa 2	158/41/15	SK Taman Puteri Wangsa
Puteri Wangsa (N41)	Pelangi Gaya	158/41/16	SMK Taman Pelangi Indah; SK Taman Pelangi Indah
Puteri Wangsa (N41)	Pinang Sagu	158/41/17	SK Taman Daya 3
Puteri Wangsa (N41)	Setia Enau	158/41/18	SMK Taman Daya 2; SA Taman Setia Indah; Dewan Serbaguna Taman Setia Indah
Puteri Wangsa (N41)	Bukit Mutiara	158/41/19	SK Bukit Mutiara
Puteri Wangsa (N41)	Desa Tebrau	158/41/20	SMK Taman Desa Tebrau

=== Representation history ===
Members of the Legislative Assembly for Puteri Wangsa
Assembly	No	Years	Member	Party
Constituency created from Tiram
11th	N41	2004–2008	Abdul Halim Suleiman	BN (UMNO)
12th	N41	2008–2013	Abdul Halim Suleiman	BN (UMNO)
13th	N41	2013–2018	Abdullah Husin	PR (PAS)
14th	N41	2018–2020	Mazlan Bujang	PH (BERSATU)
14th	N41	2020–2022	Mazlan Bujang	PN (BERSATU)
15th	N41	2022–2026	Amira Aisya Abdul Aziz	MUDA
16th	N41	2026-present	Maszlee Malik	PH (PKR)

== Election results ==
Johor state election, 2026: Puteri Wangsa
Party	Candidate	Votes	%	∆%
PH	Maszlee Malik	41,821	48.44	▲48.44
BN	Teow Chia Ling	36,077	41.78	▲22.00
MUDA	Rashifa Aljuneid	5,887	6.82	▼36.40
BERSAMA	Nicholas Paul Vincent	2,332	2.70	▲2.70
Independent	Wang Wee Szong	227	0.26	▲0.26
Total valid votes		86,344	100.00	
Total rejected ballots		612		
Unreturned ballots		90		
Turnout		87,046	67.62	▲19.70
Registered electors		128,723		
Majority		5,744	6.65	▼6.78
PH gain from MUDA		Swing		?

Johor state election, 2022: Puteri Wangsa
Party	Candidate	Votes	%	∆%
MUDA	Amira Aisya Abdul Aziz	22,884	43.22	▲43.22
BN	Ng Yew Aik	15,770	29.78	▲6.23
PN	Loh Kah Yong	8,957	16.92	▲16.92
PBM	Choong Shiau Yoon	2,471	4.67	▲4.67
PEJUANG	Khairil Anwar Razali	2,468	4.66	▲4.66
Independent	Adzrin Adam	398	0.75	▲0.75
Total valid votes		52,948	100.00	
Total rejected ballots		774		
Unreturned ballots		341		
Turnout		54,063	47.93	
Registered electors		112,804		
Majority		7,114	13.44	
MUDA gain from PKR		Swing		?

Johor state election, 2018: Puteri Wangsa
Party	Candidate	Votes	%	∆%
PKR	Mazlan Bujang	37,545	70.25	▲70.25
BN	Abd Aziz Tohak	12,586	23.55	▼20.64
PAS	Abdullah Husin	2,654	4.97	▼48.29
Independent	Lim Yak Hong	544	1.02	▲1.02
Independent	Ting Choon Chai	116	0.22	▲0.22
Total valid votes		53,445	100.00	
Total rejected ballots		564		
Unreturned ballots		197		
Turnout		54,188	86.91	
Registered electors		62,347		
Majority		29,959		
PKR gain from PAS		Swing		?
Source(s) Suruhanjaya Pilihan Raya Malaysia The Star

Johor state election, 2013: Puteri Wangsa
Party	Candidate	Votes	%	∆%
PAS	Abdullah Husin	20,357	53.26	▲53.26
BN	Soorianarayanan Muniyandy	16,888	44.19	▼19.06
Independent	Ravindaran Doraisamy	973	2.55	▲2.55
Total valid votes		38,218	100.00	
Total rejected ballots		709		
Unreturned ballots		0		
Turnout		38,927	88.83	
Registered electors		43,824		
Majority		3,469		
PAS gain from BN		Swing		?

Johor state election, 2008: Puteri Wangsa
Party	Candidate	Votes	%	∆%
BN	Abdul Halim Suleiman	13,656	63.25	▼23.01
PKR	MK Selvakumaran	7,935	36.75	▲23.01
Total valid votes		21,591	100.00	
Total rejected ballots		485		
Unreturned ballots		0		
Turnout		22,076	77.50	
Registered electors		28,487		
Majority		5,721		
BN hold		Swing		

Johor state election, 2004: Puteri Wangsa
Party	Candidate	Votes	%
BN	Abdul Halim Suleiman	14,677	86.26
PKR	Abdul Razak Ahmad	2,337	13.74
Total valid votes		17,014	100.00
Total rejected ballots		330	
Unreturned ballots		19	
Turnout		17,363	74.9
Registered electors		23,181	
Majority		12,340	
This is a new created constituency
