= Machap (state constituency) =

Political subdivision in Malaysia

Machap (N26)
Johor constituency

State constituency
- Legislature: Johor State Legislative Assembly
MLA
Onn Hafiz Ghazi
BN
- Constituency created: 2003
- First contested: 2004
- Last contested: 2026

Demographics
- Population (2020): 46,807
- Electors (2026): 35,206
- Area (km²): 376

Machap is a state constituency in Johor, Malaysia, that is represented in the Johor State Legislative Assembly.

The state constituency was first contested in 2004 and is mandated to return a single Assemblyman to the Johor State Legislative Assembly under the first-past-the-post voting system.

== Demographics ==
As of 2020, Machap has a population of 46,807 people.

Ethnic breakdown of Machap's electorate as of 2026
1. Malay (66.0%)
2. Chinese (27.0%)
3. Indian (5.40%)
4. Other ethnicities (1.70%)

== History ==
=== Polling districts ===
According to the federal gazette issued on 2 July 2026, the Machap constituency has a total of 12 polling districts.

State constituency	Polling District	Code	Location
Machap (N26)	Sri Desa	151/26/01	Balai Raya Kampung Sri Desa
Machap (N26)	Rancangan FELDA Ayer Hitam	151/26/02	SK LKTP Ayer Hitam
Machap (N26)	Sri Lalang	151/26/03	SK Seri Lalang
Machap (N26)	Pekan Machap	151/26/04	SJK (C) Machap
Machap (N26)	Machap	151/26/05	SK Seri Machap
Machap (N26)	Kampong Ulu Benut	151/26/06	SK Seri Kencana
Machap (N26)	Bandar Simpang Renggam Utara	151/26/07	SJK (C) Tuan Poon
Machap (N26)	Bandar Simpang Renggam Timor	151/26/08	SK Simpang Renggam
Machap (N26)	Simpang Renggam	151/26/09	SMK Dato' Abdul Rahman Andak; SMK Simpang Renggam
Machap (N26)	FELCRA Simpang Renggam	151/26/10	SK Bukit Kenangan
Machap (N26)	Jalan Benut	151/26/11	SK Dato' Ibrahim Majid
Machap (N26)	Ladang Nenas	151/26/12	SK Sungai Linau

=== Representation history ===
Members of the Legislative Assembly for Machap
Assembly	No	Years	Member	Party
Constituency created from Simpang Renggam
11th	N26	2004–2008	Abd Hamid Abd Rahman	BN (UMNO)
12th	N26	2008–2013	Abd Hamid Abd Rahman	BN (UMNO)
13th	N26	2013–2018	Abd Taib Abu Bakar	BN (UMNO)
14th	N26	2018–2022	Abd Taib Abu Bakar	BN (UMNO)
15th	N26	2022–2026	Onn Hafiz Ghazi	BN (UMNO)
16th	N26	2026–present	Onn Hafiz Ghazi	BN (UMNO)

== Election results ==
Johor state election, 2026
Party	Candidate	Votes	%	∆%
BN	Onn Hafiz Ghazi	20,382	80.28	▲23.64
PH	Nur Hafiz Roslan	5,007	19.72	▲19.72
Total rejected ballots		295		
Unreturned ballots		26		
Turnout		25,710	73.03	▲13.74
Registered electors		35,206		
Majority		15,375	60.56	▲26.96
BN hold		Swing		

Johor state election, 2022
Party	Candidate	Votes	%	∆%
BN	Onn Hafiz Ghazi	11,029	56.64	▲7.49
PN	Azlisham Azahar	4,486	23.04	▲23.04
MUDA	R Sangaran	3,493	17.94	▲17.94
PEJUANG	Shahruddin Md Salleh	465	2.39	▲2.39
Total valid votes		19,473	100.00	
Total rejected ballots		425		
Unreturned ballots		120		
Turnout		20,018	59.29	▼23.71
Registered electors		33,764		
Majority		6,543	35.60	▼33.48
BN hold		Swing		

Malaysian general election, 2018
Party	Candidate	Votes	%	∆%
BN	Abd Taib Abu Bakar	9,375	49.15	▼11.05
PKR	Ahmad Ahem	8,971	47.03	▲47.03
PAS	Azlisham Azahar	1,630	8.54	▼31.26
Total valid votes		19,076	100.00	
Total rejected ballots		0		
Unreturned ballots		0		
Turnout		19,076	82.70	▼5.37
Registered electors		24,156		
Majority		404	2.12	▼18.28
BN hold		Swing		
Source(s) "PILIHAN RAYA UMUM KE-14". Suruhanjaya Pilihan Raya Malaysia. 3 May 2018.

Malaysian general election, 2013
Party	Candidate	Votes	%	∆%
BN	Abd Taib Abu Bakar	11,515	60.20	▼5.12
PAS	Mohd Khalid Salekan	7,613	39.80	▲5.12
Total valid votes		19,128	97.75	
Total rejected ballots		442	2.26	
Unreturned ballots		0		
Turnout		19,570	88.07	▲11.24
Registered electors		24,156		
Majority		3,902	20.40	▼13.26
BN hold		Swing		

Malaysian general election, 2008
Party	Candidate	Votes	%	∆%
BN	Abdul Hamid Abdul Rahman	8,909	65.32	▼14.61
PAS	Abdullah Husin	4,731	34.68	▲14.61
Total valid votes		13,640	97.31	
Total rejected ballots		369	2.63	
Unreturned ballots		8	0.00	
Turnout		14,017	76.83	▲2.01
Registered electors		18,244		
Majority		4,178	33.66	▼26.20
BN hold		Swing		

Malaysian general election, 2004
Party	Candidate	Votes	%
BN	Abdul Hamid Abdul Rahman	10,088	79.93
PAS	Abdullah Husin	2,533	20.07
Total valid votes		12,621	97.17
Total rejected ballots		351	2.70
Unreturned ballots		16	0.00
Turnout		12,988	74.82
Registered electors		16,880	
Majority		7,555	59.86
This was a new constituency created.
