= 2018 Johor state election =

Malaysian state legislative election

- 9 May 2018

All 56 seats in the Johor State Legislative Assembly 29 seats needed for a majority
- Registered: 1,817,999
- Turnout: 84.50%
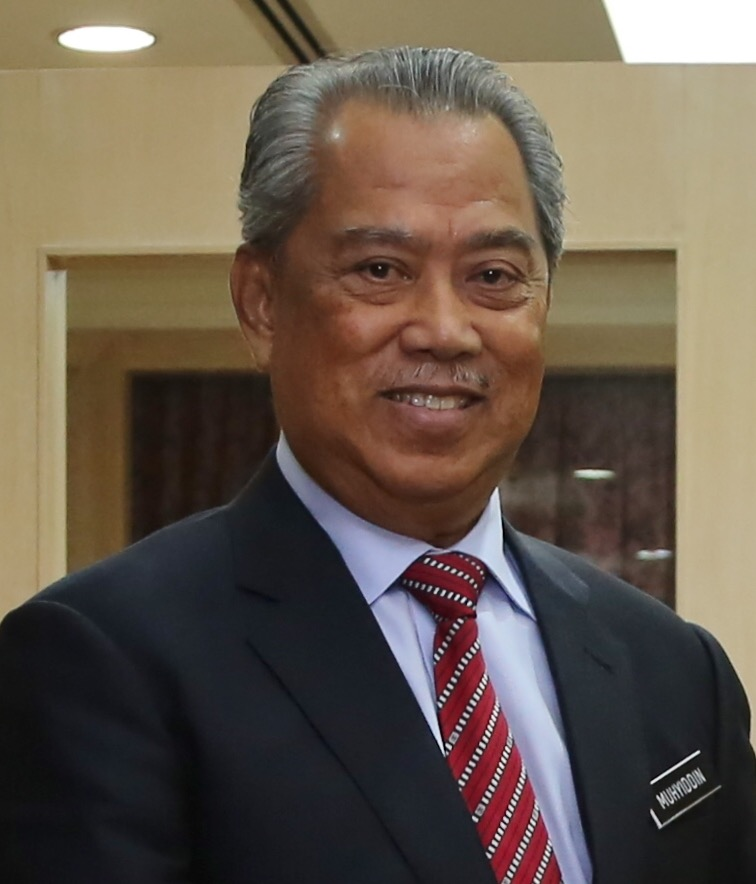

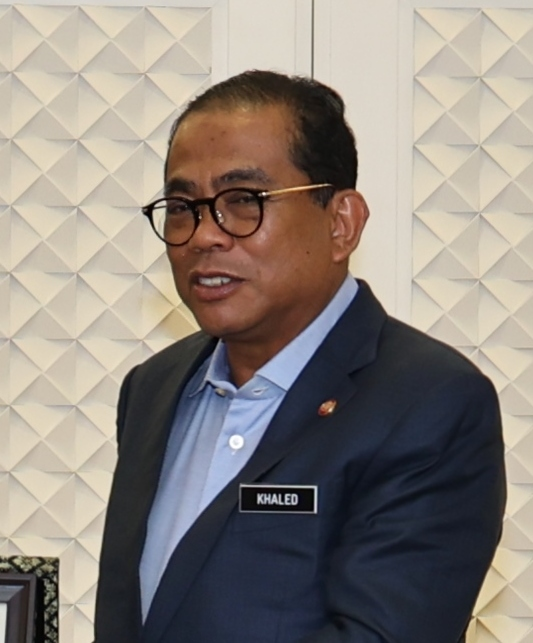

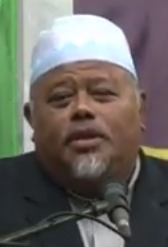
	Majority party	Minority party	Third party
Leader	Muhyiddin Yassin	Mohamed Khaled Nordin	Abdullah Husin
Party	PPBM	UMNO	PAS
Alliance	Pakatan Harapan	Barisan Nasional	Gagasan Sejahtera
Leader since	7 January 2018	2013	2017
Leader's seat	Gambir	Permas (lost re-election)	Puteri Wangsa (lost re-election)
Last election	14 seats, 24.38% (Pakatan Rakyat)	38 seats, 53.99%	4 seats, 21.41% (Pakatan Rakyat)
Seats before	16	37	3
Seats won	36	19	1
Seat change	▲20	▼18	▼2
Popular vote	803,426	582,531	118,582
Percentage	53.36%	38.69%	7.88%
Swing	▲28.98%	▼15.30%	▼13.53%
- Results by constituency
Menteri Besar before election
Mohamed Khaled Nordin
BN
Elected Menteri Besar
Osman Sapian
Pakatan Harapan

The 14th Johor State election was held on 9 May 2018, concurrently with the 2018 Malaysian general election. The previous state election was held on 5 May 2013. The state assemblymen is elected to 5 years term each.

The Johor State Legislative Assembly would automatically dissolve on 20 June 2018, the fifth anniversary of the first sitting, and elections must be held within sixty days (two months) of the dissolution (on or before 20 August 2018, with the date to be decided by the Election Commission), unless dissolved prior to that date by the Head of State (Sultan of Johor) on the advice of the Head of Government (Menteri Besar of Johor).

The results of the election saw a historic win for Pakatan Harapan (PH), winning 36 seats (a majority but 1 seat short of supermajority) and ousting Barisan Nasional from the state government, the first time since the first Johor state elections in 1955 that BN or its predecessor Alliance were defeated. BERSATU's Osman Sapian was sworn in as Menteri Besar on 12 May 2018, while the state EXCO members were sworn in on 16 May 2018.

== Contenders ==
Barisan Nasional (BN) is set to contest all 56 seats in Johor State Legislative Assembly. Barisan Nasional (BN) linchpin party United Malays National Organisation (UNMO) is to set to contest major share of Barisan Nasional (BN) seats.

Pakatan Harapan have decided to contest all 56 seats in Johor. Malaysian United Indigenous Party (Bersatu) will contest in 18 seats while the Democratic Action Party (DAP) will have 14 seats. People's Justice Party (PKR) and the National Trust Party (Amanah) will contest 12 seats each.

Pan-Malaysian Islamic Party (PAS) will compete for 40 seats.

=== Political parties ===
Coalition
Incumbent	Opposition	
Barisan Nasional (BN)	Pakatan Harapan (PH)	Gagasan Sejahtera (GS)
United Malays National Organisation (UMNO); Parti Gerakan Rakyat Malaysia (Gerakan); Malaysian Chinese Association (MCA); Malaysian Indian Congress (MIC)	Malaysian United Indigenous Party (Bersatu); Democratic Action Party (DAP); People's Justice Party (PKR); National Trust Party (Amanah)	Malaysian Islamic Party (PAS)

== The contested seats ==
No.	State constituency	Incumbent State Assemblyman	Political parties							
No.	State constituency	Incumbent State Assemblyman	Barisan Nasional		Pakatan Harapan		Gagasan Sejahtera		Other parties/Ind	
No.	State constituency	Incumbent State Assemblyman	Candidate Name	Party	Candidate Name	Party	Candidate Name	Party	Candidate Name	Party
N01	Buloh Kasap	Norshida Ibrahim (BN)	Zahari Sarip	UMNO	Norsamsu Mohd. Yusof	Bersatu				
N02	Jementah	Tan Chen Choon (PH)	Chiam Yok Meng	MCA	Tan Chen Choon	DAP	Mazlan Ahmad	PAS		
N03	Pemanis	Lau Chin Hoon (BN)	Koo Siaw Lee	Gerakan	Chong Fat Full	PKR	Normala Sudirman	PAS		
N04	Kemelah	Ayub Rahmat (BN)	Anuar Abdul Manap	UMNO	Sulaiman Mohd Nor	Amanah				
N05	Tenang	Mohd Azahar Ibrahim (BN)	Mohd Azahar Ibrahim	UMNO	Mohd. Solihan Badri	Bersatu	Nasharudin Awang	PAS		
N06	Bekok	Lim Eng Guan (PH)	Tan Chong	MCA	S Ramakrishnan	DAP				
N07	Bukit Kepong (previously known as Bukit Serampang)	Ismail Mohamed (BN)	Mohd Noor Taib	UMNO	Sahruddin Jamal	Bersatu	Muhamad Nur Iqbal Abd Razak	PAS		
N08	Bukit Pasir (previously known as Jorak)	Sharuddin Md Salleh (PH)	Noriah Mahat	UMNO	Pizi Jihat	Bersatu	Najib Lep	PAS		
N09	Gambir	M Asojan Muniyandy (BN)	M. Asojan Muniyandy	MIC	Muhyiddin Yassin	Bersatu	Mahfodz Mohamed	PAS		
N10	Tangkak	Ee Chin Li (PH)	Goh Tee Tee	MCA	Ee Chin Li	DAP				
N11	Serom	Abd Razak Minhat (BN)	Rahim Talib	UMNO	Faizul Amri Adnan	Amanah	Mustaffa Salleh	PAS		
N12	Bentayan	Chua Wee Beng (PH)	Lee Kim Heng	MCA	Ng Yak Howe	DAP				
N13	Simpang Jeram (previously known as Sungai Abong)	Sheikh Ibrahim Salleh (GS)	Mohd Radzi Md Amin	UMNO	Salahuddin Ayub	Amanah	Mohd Mazri Yahya	PAS		
N14	Bukit Naning	Saipolbahari Suib (BN)	Hassan Johari	UMNO	Md Ysahrudin Kusni	PKR	Azman Ibrahim	PAS		
N15	Maharani	Mohammad Taslim (GS)	Ashari Sharif	UMNO	Nor Hayati Bachok	Amanah	Mohammad Taslim	PAS		
N16	Sungai Balang	Zaiton Ismail (BN)	Zaiton Ismail	UMNO	Na’im Jusri	PKR	Cheman Yusoh	PAS		
N17	Semerah	Mohd Ismail Roslan (BN)	Mohd Ismail Roslan	UMNO	Mohd Khuzzan Abu Bakar	PKR	Adnan Othman	PAS		
N18	Sri Medan	Zulkurnain Kamisan (BN)	Zulkurnain Kamisan	UMNO	Mohd. Ajib Omar	Bersatu	Sallehuddin Ab Rashid	PAS		
N19	Yong Peng	Chew Peck Choo (PH)	Ling Tian Soon	MCA	Chew Peck Choo	DAP	Muhammad Abdullah	PAS		
N20	Semarang	Samsolbari Jamali (BN)	Samsolbari Jamali	UMNO	Zais Mohd. Akil	Bersatu	Mohd Bakri Samian	PAS		
N21	Parit Yaani	Aminolhuda Hassan (PH)	Soh Lip Yan	MCA	Aminolhuda Hassan	Amanah	Nasir Abdullah	PAS		
N22	Parit Raja	Azizah Zakaria (BN)	Norashidah Ramli	UMNO	Ferdaus Kayau	Bersatu	Abdul Hadi Harun	PAS		
N23	Penggaram	Gan Peck Cheng (PH)	Kang Beng Kuan	MCA	Gan Peck Cheng	DAP	Misran Samian	PAS		
N24	Senggarang	A Aziz Ismail (BN)	Zaidi Jaffar	UMNO	Khairuddin A. Rahim	Amanah	Mohd Ramli Md Kari	PAS		
N25	Rengit	Ayub Jamil (BN)	Ayub Jamil	UMNO	Malik Faishal Ahmad	PKR	Mohd Tumiran Ahmad	PAS		
N26	Machap	Abd Taib Abu Bakar (BN)	Abd Taib Abu Bakar	UMNO	Ahmad Ahem	Bersatu	Azlisham Azhar	PAS		
N27	Layang-Layang	Abd Mutalip Abd Rahim (BN)	Onn Hafiz Ghazi	UMNO	Murugan Muthu Samy	PKR	Mohd Jubri Selamat	PAS		
N28	Mengkibol	Tan Hong Pin (PH)	Chin Sim Lai	MCA	Chew Chong Sin	DAP				
N29	Mahkota	Md Jais Sarday (BN)	Md Jais Sarday	UMNO	Muhamad Said Jonit	Amanah	Muhammad Hasbullah Md Najib	PAS		
N30	Paloh	Teoh Yap Kun (BN)	Teoh Yap Kun	MCA	Sheikh Omar Ali	DAP				
N31	Kahang	Vidyananthan Ramanadhan (BN)	Vidyananthan Ramanadhan	MIC	Norlihan Ariffin	Bersatu				
N32	Endau	Abd Latiff Bandi (BN)	Alwiyah Talib	UMNO	Norul Haszarul Abu Samah	Bersatu	Roslan Nikmat	PAS		
N33	Tenggaroh	Raven Kumar Krishnasamyi (BN)	Raven Kumar Krishnasamyi	MIC	Roahamizon Abdul Ghani	PKR	A. Rahman A. Hamid	PAS		
N34	Panti	Baderi Dasuki (BN)	Hahasrin Hashim	UMNO	Jawahir Hussein	Bersatu	Mohd Nazari Mokhtar	PAS		
N35	Pasir Raja	Adham Baba (BN)	Rashidah Ismail	UMNO	Abrary Ramly	Amanah	Bahrin Alias	PAS		
N36	Sedili	Rasman Ithnain (BN)	Rasman Ithnain	UMNO	Abd Razak Esa	PKR				
N37	Johor Lama	Asiah Md Ariff (BN)	Roslaily Jahari	UMNO	Nor Ashidah Ibrahim	PKR	Siti Zaharah Othman	PAS		
N38	Penawar	Hamimah Mansor (BN)	Sharifah Azizah Syed Zain	UMNO	Ahmad Kamal Nor	Amanah				
N39	Tanjung Surat	Syed Sis A Rahman (BN)	Syed Sis A. Rahman	UMNO	Zamil Najwah Arbain	PKR				
N40	Tiram	Maulizan Bujang (BN)	Maulizan Bujang	UMNO	Subramaniam	PKR	Azman Atmin	PAS		
N41	Puteri Wangsa	Abdullah Husin (GS)	Abdul Aziz Tohak	UMNO	Mazlan Bujang	Bersatu	Abdullah Husin	PAS		
N42	Johor Jaya	Liow Cai Tung (PH)	Tan Cher Puk	MCA	Liow Cai Tung	DAP	R. Kumutha	PAS		
N43	Permas	Mohamed Khaled Nordin (BN)	Mohamed Khaled Nordin	UMNO	Che Zakaria Mohd. Salleh	Bersatu	Ab Aziz Abdullah	PAS		
N44	Larkin (previously known as Tanjong Puteri)	Adam Sumiru (BN)	Yahya Jaafar	UMNO	Mohd. Izhar Ahmad	Bersatu	Zakiah Tukirin	PAS		
N45	Stulang	Chen Kah Eng (PH)	Ang Boon Heng	MCA	Chen Kah Eng	DAP				
N46	Perling (previously known as Pengkalan Rinting)	Cheo Yee How (PH)	Wong You Fong	MCA	Cheo Yee How	DAP	Muhamad Nazrin Ihsan	PAS		
N47	Kempas	Tengku Putra Haron Aminurrashid Tengku Hamid Jumat (BN)	Ramli Bohani	UMNO	Osman Sapian	Bersatu	Dzulkifli Suleiman	PAS		
N48	Skudai	Boo Cheng Hau (PH)	G.S. Kanan	MIC	Tan Hong Pin	DAP				
N49	Kota Iskandar (previously known as Nusa Jaya)	Zaini Abu Bakar (BN)	Khairi Abd Malek	UMNO	Dzulkefly Ahmad	Amanah	Sallehuddin Mohd Dahiran	PAS		
N50	Bukit Permai	Ali Mazat Salleh (BN)	Ali Mazat Salleh	UMNO	Tosrin Jarvanthi	Bersatu	Ab Aziz Jaafar	PAS		
N51	Bukit Batu	Jimmy Puah Wee Tse (PH)	Teo Lee Ho	Gerakan	Jimmy Puah Wee Tse	PKR	Juwahir Amin	PAS		
N52	Senai	Wong Shu Qi (PH)	Shen Poh Kuan	MCA	Tee Boon Tsong	DAP				
N53	Benut	Hasni Mohammad (BN)	Hasni Mohammad	UMNO	Zulkifli Tasrib	Bersatu	Mohd Firdaus Jaffar	PAS		
N54	Pulai Sebatang	Tee Siew Kiong (BN)	Tee Siew Kiong	MCA	Taqiuddin Cheman	Amanah	Baharom Mohamad	PAS		
N55	Pekan Nanas	Yeo Tung Siong (PH)	Tan Eng Meng	MCA	Yeo Tung Siong	DAP				
N56	Kukup	Suhaimi Salleh (BN)	Mohd Othman Yusof	UMNO	Suhaizan Kaiat	Amanah	Abdul Karim Deraman	PAS		

== Election pendulum ==
The 14th General Election witnessed 36 governmental seats and 20 non-governmental seats filled the Johor State Legislative Assembly. The government side has 12 safe seats and 7 fairly safe seats, while the non-government side has 4 safe seats and 3 fairly safe seats.

2018 Johor state election

GOVERNMENT SEATS
Marginal
Semerah	Mohd. Khuzzan Abu Bakar	PKR	42.84
Pemanis	Chong Fat Full	PKR	45.14
Senggarang	Khairuddin A. Rahim	AMANAH	45.90
Mahkota	Muhamad Said Jonit	AMANAH	48.24
Bukit Naning	Md. Ysahrudin Kusni	PKR	48.38
Bukit Kepong	Sahruddin Jamal	BERSATU	48.98
Serom	Faizul Amri Adnan	AMANAH	49.20
Pulai Sebatang	Taqiuddin Cheman	AMANAH	50.73
Tenang	Mohd. Solihan Badri	BERSATU	50.92
Paloh	Sheikh Umar Bagharib Ali	DAP	52.10
Tiram	Gopalakrishnan Subramaniam	PKR	52.71
Bukit Permai	Tosrin Jarvanthi	BERSATU	52.73
Pekan Nanas	Yeo Tung Siong	DAP	52.92
Gambir	Muhyiddin Mohd. Yassin	BERSATU	53.33
Maharani	Nor Hayati Bachok	AMANAH	53.92
Parit Yaani	Aminolhuda Hassan	AMANAH	54.16
Permas	Che Zakaria Mohd. Salleh	BERSATU	54.19
Fairly safe
Larkin	Mohd. Izhar Ahmad	BERSATU	56.00
Kemelah	Sulaiman Mohd. Nor	AMANAH	56.10
Bekok	Ramakrishnan Suppiah	DAP	57.25
Kota Iskandar	Dzulkefly Ahmad	AMANAH	58.35
Jementah	Tan Chen Choon	DAP	59.07
Yong Peng	Chew Peck Choo	DAP	59.26
Kempas	Osman Sapian	BERSATU	59.68
Safe
Tangkak	Ee Chin Li	DAP	61.57
Simpang Jeram	Salahuddin Ayub	AMANAH	61.62
Johor Jaya	Liow Cai Tung	DAP	62.53
Perling	Cheo Yee How	DAP	63.24
Penggaram	Gan Peck Cheng	DAP	64.44
Bukit Batu	Jimmy Puah Wee Tse	PKR	65.68
Stulang	Andrew Chen Kah Eng	DAP	67.55
Puteri Wangsa	Mazlan Bujang	BERSATU	70.25
Mengkibol	Chew Chong Sin	DAP	74.10
Senai	Tee Boon Tsong	DAP	75.10
Skudai	Tan Hong Pin	DAP	79.47
Bentayan	Ng Yak Howe	DAP	79.72

NON-GOVERNMENT SEATS
Marginal
Sungai Balang	Zaiton Ismail	UMNO	42.19
Parit Raja	Norashidah Ramli	UMNO	44.28
Machap	Abd. Taib Abu Bakar	UMNO	46.93
Layang-Layang	Onn Hafiz Ghazi	UMNO	46.93
Endau	Alwiyah Talib	UMNO	47.95
Kukup	Mohd. Othman Yusof	UMNO	49.60
Pasir Raja	Rashidah Ismail	UMNO	51.59
Buloh Kasap	Zahari Sarip	UMNO	52.51
Panti	Hahasrin Hashim	UMNO	53.15
Tenggaroh	Raven Kumar Krishnasamy	MIC	54.96
Bukit Pasir	Najib Lep	PAS	55.29
Rengit	Ayub Jamil	UMNO	55.33
Benut	Hasni Mohammad	UMNO	55.43
Fairly safe
Sri Medan	Zulkarnain Kamisan	UMNO	56.88
Kahang	Vidyanathan Ramanadhan	MIC	57.66
Semarang	Samsolbari Jamali	UMNO	59.45
Safe
Johor Lama	Roslaily Jahari	UMNO	60.57
Tanjung Surat	Syed Sis Syed A. Rahman	UMNO	65.37
Penawar	Sharifah Azizah Syed Zain	UMNO	70.35
Sedili	Rasman Ithnain	UMNO	75.98

== Results ==
Party or alliance		Votes	%	Seats	+/–
Pakatan Harapan	Democratic Action Party	312,183	20.73	14	+1
Pakatan Harapan	Malaysian United Indigenous Party	214,703	14.26	8	New
Pakatan Harapan	National Trust Party	161,656	10.74	9	New
Pakatan Harapan	People's Justice Party	114,884	7.63	5	+4
Pakatan Harapan	Total	803,426	53.36	36	+22
Barisan Nasional	United Malays National Organisation	379,886	25.23	17	–15
Barisan Nasional	Malaysian Chinese Association	145,154	9.64	0	–2
Barisan Nasional	Malaysian Indian Congress	42,502	2.82	2	–1
Barisan Nasional	Parti Gerakan Rakyat Malaysia	14,989	1.00	0	–1
Barisan Nasional	Total	582,531	38.69	19	–19
Pan-Malaysian Islamic Party		118,582	7.88	1	-3
Independent		1,226	0.08	0	-
Total		1,505,765	100.00	56	0
Valid votes		1,505,765	98.02		
Invalid/blank votes		30,416	1.98		
Total votes		1,536,181	100.00		
Registered voters/turnout		1,817,999	84.50		

=== Seats that changed allegiance ===
No.	Seat	Previous Party (2013)	Current Party (2018)
N03	(Johor) Pemanis	Barisan Nasional (GERAKAN)	Pakatan Harapan (PKR)
N04	(Johor) Kemelah	Barisan Nasional (UMNO)	Pakatan Harapan (AMANAH)
N05	(Johor) Tenang	Barisan Nasional (UMNO)	Pakatan Harapan (BERSATU)
N07	(Johor) Bukit Kepong	Barisan Nasional (UMNO)	Pakatan Harapan (BERSATU)
N08	(Johor) Bukit Pasir	Barisan Nasional (UMNO)	Gagasan Sejahtera (PAS)
N09	(Johor) Gambir	Barisan Nasional (MIC)	Pakatan Harapan (BERSATU)
N11	(Johor) Serom	Barisan Nasional (UMNO)	Pakatan Harapan (AMANAH)
N13	(Johor) Simpang Jeram	Gagasan Sejahtera (PAS)	Pakatan Harapan (AMANAH)
N14	(Johor) Bukit Naning	Barisan Nasional (UMNO)	Pakatan Harapan (PKR)
N15	(Johor) Maharani	Gagasan Sejahtera (PAS)	Pakatan Harapan (AMANAH)
N17	(Johor) Semerah	Barisan Nasional (UMNO)	Pakatan Harapan (PKR)
N21	(Johor) Parit Yaani	Gagasan Sejahtera (PAS)	Pakatan Harapan (AMANAH)
N24	(Johor) Senggarang	Barisan Nasional (UMNO)	Pakatan Harapan (AMANAH)
N29	(Johor) Mahkota	Barisan Nasional (UMNO)	Pakatan Harapan (AMANAH)
N30	(Johor) Paloh	Barisan Nasional (MCA)	Pakatan Harapan (DAP)
N40	(Johor) Tiram	Barisan Nasional (UMNO)	Pakatan Harapan (PKR)
N41	(Johor) Puteri Wangsa	Gagasan Sejahtera (PAS)	Pakatan Harapan (BERSATU)
N43	(Johor) Permas	Barisan Nasional (UMNO)	Pakatan Harapan (BERSATU)
N44	(Johor) Larkin	Barisan Nasional (UMNO)	Pakatan Harapan (BERSATU)
N47	(Johor) Kempas	Barisan Nasional (UMNO)	Pakatan Harapan (BERSATU)
N49	(Johor) Kota Iskandar	Barisan Nasional (UMNO)	Pakatan Harapan (AMANAH)
N50	(Johor) Bukit Permai	Barisan Nasional (UMNO)	Pakatan Harapan (BERSATU)
N54	(Johor) Pulai Sebatang	Barisan Nasional (MCA)	Pakatan Harapan (AMANAH)

== Aftermath ==
The results in Johor were seen as shocking to many, since the state was the birthplace of UMNO, and were viewed as 'fortress' with no defeats by BN or Alliance since 1955, the start of Johor state elections.

Osman had only led the state government for 11 months, before resigning as Menteri Besar in April 2019. He were replaced by another BERSATU MLA, Sahruddin Jamal, as Menteri Besar, who then led the state government for another 11 months, until the wake of 2020 Malaysian political crisis, which saw the exit of BERSATU and most of its MLAs from PH, which resulted in Sahruddin's resignation.

A new state government formed under a coalition of BN and Perikatan Nasional (BERSATU and PAS), with BN's Hasni Mohammad sworn in as Menteri Besar in February 2020. That government, in turn, lasted another 23 months until the death of Osman in December 2021 that reduced the majority of the government into a minority government, which subsequently resulted in a snap election being called by Hasni in January 2022 and took place in March 2022.
