= 2012 Democratic Action Party leadership election =

A leadership election was held by the Democratic Action Party (DAP) on 15 December 2012.

== Central Executive Committee election results ==
[ Source]

Candidate	Delegates' votes (max. 20)
Lim Kit Siang	1,607 votes
Lim Guan Eng	1,576 votes
Karpal Singh	1,411 votes
Chong Chieng Jen	1,210 votes
Anthony Loke Siew Fook	1,202 votes
Tan Kok Wai	1,199 votes
Gobind Singh Deo	1,197 votes
Tony Pua Kiam Wee	1,162 votes
Teng Chang Khim	1,152 votes
Fong Kui Lun	1,137 votes
Nga Kor Ming	1,075 votes
Chong Eng	1,006 votes
Chow Kon Yeow	986 votes
Liew Chin Tong	984 votes
Kulasegaran Murugeson	984 votes
Boo Cheng Hau	958 votes
Teresa Kok Suh Sim	925 votes
Teo Nie Ching	903 votes
Ngeh Koo Ham	824 votes
Zairil Khir Johari	803 votes
Tan Seng Giaw	802 votes
Sivakumar Varatharaju Naidu	792 votes
Ronnie Liu Tian Khiew	761 votes
Jimmy Wong Sze Phin	761 votes
Ramasamy Palanisamy	746 votes
Vincent Wu Him Ven	669 votes
Ean Yong Hian Wah	644 votes
Thomas Su Keong Siong	585 votes
Leong Ngah Ngah	571 votes
Jeff Ooi Chuan Aun	460 votes
Lim Lip Eng	448 votes
Ganabatirau Veraman	411 votes
Ng Wei Aik	407 votes
Khoo Poay Tiong	353 votes
Sivasubramaniam Athinarayanan	353 votes
Ariffin SM Omar	348 votes
Ahmad Ton	347 votes
Manogaran Marimuthu	305 votes
Zulkifli Mohd Noor	249 votes
Jagdeep Singh Deo	227 votes
Manoharan Malayalam	216 votes
Apalasamy Jataliah	212 votes
Teh Yee Cheu	197 votes
John Fernandez	187 votes
Hiew King Cheu	171 votes
Tanasekharan Autherapady	171 votes
R. S. N. Rayer	169 votes
Soh Boon Hong	158 votes
Letchimanan Thatharan	150 votes
Tan Lee Koon	131 votes
Tengku Zulpuri Shah Raja Puji	121 votes
Sivanesan Achalingam	112 votes
Lee Guan Aik	103 votes
Kamache Doray Rajoo	102 votes
Leon Jimat Donald	99 votes
Solaiman Syed Ibrahim	98 votes
Siow Kim Leong	74 votes
Gnanaguru Ganisan	69 votes
Roseli Abdul Gani	69 votes
Tan Boon Peng	40 votes
Ng Chin Tsai	39 votes
Harun Ahmad	28 votes
Wong Sai Hoong	23 votes
Choong Siew Onn	withdrawn
Er Teck Hwa	withdrawn
Jaya Balan Valliappan	withdrawn
Teo Kok Seong	withdrawn
Violet Yong Wui Wui	withdrawn
