= Arumugam Veerappa Pillai =

Malaysian politician

Yang Berhormat Tuan Arumugam Veerappa Pillai MLA

Member of the Pahang State Legislative Assembly for Sabai
- Incumbent
- Assumed office 19 November 2022
- Preceded by: Kamache Doray Rajoo (PH–DAP)
- Majority: 96 (2022)

Personal details
- Born: Arumugam a/l Veerappa Pillai
- Party: Malaysian Indian Congress (MIC)
- Other political affiliations: Barisan Nasional (BN)
- Occupation: Politician

Arumugam s/o Veerappa Pillai is a Malaysian politician who served as Member of the Pahang State Legislative Assembly (MLA) for Sabai since November 2022. He is a member of the Malaysian Indian Congress (MIC), a component party of Barisan Nasional (BN) coalitions. He is currently the sole MIC MLA in Pahang.

== Election results ==
Pahang State Legislative Assembly
Year	Constituency	Candidate	Votes	Pct	Opponent(s)	Votes	Pct	Ballots cast	Majority	Turnout
2022	N35 Sabai	Arumugam Veerappa Pillai (MIC)	4,444	37.52%	Kamache Doray Rajoo (DAP)	4,348	36.71%	12,005	96	76.74%
2022	N35 Sabai	Arumugam Veerappa Pillai (MIC)	4,444	37.52%	Nurul Qomar Abdol Talin (BERSATU)	3,053	25.77%	12,005	96	76.74%
