= Freddie Long Hoo Hin =

Malaysian politician

Yang Berbahagia Datuk Freddie Long Hoo Hin PJN AMN PIS II

Member of the Johor State Executive Council
- In office 1986 – 1995; Tourism and Environment
- Monarch: Sultan Iskandar
- Menteri Besar: Muhyiddin Yassin

Member of Johor State Legislative Assembly for Stulang
- In office 1995–2008
- Preceded by: constituency created
- Succeeded by: Mok Chek Hou

Member of Johor State Legislative Assembly for Gertak Merah
- In office 1986–1995
- Preceded by: constituency created
- Succeeded by: constituency abolished

Personal details
- Born: Long Hoo Hin @ Long Ah Mui; 21 September 1943
- Died: 4 November 2019 (aged 76)
- Party: Malaysian Chinese Association (MCA)
- Other political affiliations: Barisan Nasional (BN)
- Occupation: Politician
- Profession: lawyer

Freddie Long Hoo Hin (21 September 1943 – 4 November 2019) was a Malaysian politician. He served as a Member of Legislative Assembly for Gertak Merah from 1986 to 1995 and a Member of Legislative Assembly for Stulang from 1995 to 2008. He was a member of Malaysian Chinese Association (MCA), a component party of Barisan Nasional (BN).

As revealed in the 101st episode of Keluar Sekejap, Freddie Long was the one who influenced current MCA President, Wee Ka Siong in joining the political organisation.

== Election results ==
Johor State Legislative Assembly
Year	Constituency	Candidate	Votes	Pct	Opponent(s)	Votes	Pct	Ballots cast	Majority	Turnout
1986	N32 Gertak Merah	Freddie Long Hoo Hin (MCA)	8,260	58.59%	Gurdial Singh Nijar (PSRM)	5,839	41.41%	14,672	2,421	59.24%
1990	N32 Gertak Merah	Freddie Long Hoo Hin (MCA)	10,035	59.36%	Zaharah Mohamed Yusof (S46)	6,869	40.64%	17,355	3,166	64.13%
1995	N34 Stulang	Freddie Long Hoo Hin (MCA)	Unknown							
1999	N34 Stulang	Freddie Long Hoo Hin (MCA)	Unknown							
2004	N45 Stulang	Freddie Long Hoo Hin (MCA)	22,659	79.30%	Nrman Joseph Fernandez (DAP)	5,914	20.70%	29,972	16,745	68.89%

== Honours ==
- Malaysia
  - Member of the Order of the Defender of the Realm (AMN) (1989)
  - Commander of the Order of Meritorious Service (PJN) – Datuk (2008)
- Johor
  - Second Class of the Sultan Ibrahim Medal (PIS II) (1989)

== Death ==
Freddie Long Hoo Hin died on 4 November 2019 due to cancer.
