= Stulang (state constituency) =

Political subdivision in Malaysia

Stulang (N45)
Johor constituency

State constituency
- Legislature: Johor State Legislative Assembly
MLA
Andrew Chen Kah Eng
PH
- Constituency created: 1994
- First contested: 1995
- Last contested: 2026

Demographics
- Population (2020): 78,555
- Electors (2026): 60,029
- Area (km²): 15

Stulang is a state constituency in Johor, Malaysia, that is represented in the Johor State Legislative Assembly.

The state constituency was first contested in 1995 and is mandated to return a single Assemblyman to the Johor State Legislative Assembly under the first-past-the-post voting system.

== Demographics ==
As of 2020, Stulang has a population of 78,555 people.

Ethnic breakdown of Stulang's electorate as of 2026
1. Chinese (52.7%)
2. Malay (38.8%)
3. Indian (4.80%)
4. Other ethnicities (3.60%)

== History ==
=== Polling districts ===
According to the federal gazette issued on 2 July 2026, the Stulang constituency has a total of 17 polling districts.

State constituency	Polling District	Code	Location
Stulang (N45)	Majedee Bahru	160/45/01	SK Majidee Baru
Stulang (N45)	Sulaiman Menteri	160/45/02	Dewan Serbaguna Majidee; Dewan Komuniti dan Tadika KEMAS Ros Bestari
Stulang (N45)	Setanggi	160/45/03	SA Majidee Baru
Stulang (N45)	Sentosa	160/45/04	SK Sri Tebrau
Stulang (N45)	Sri Tebrau (1)	160/45/05	SMK Sri Tebrau
Stulang (N45)	Bakar Batu	160/45/06	SK Tebrau Bakar Batu; SA Bakar Batu; Dewan Serbaguna PPR Sri Stulang; Dewan Serbaguna Taman Desa Belantik
Stulang (N45)	Pelangi	160/45/07	SK Taman Pelangi
Stulang (N45)	Taman Maju Jaya	160/45/08	SA Bersepadu Johor Bahru
Stulang (N45)	Kampong Wadi Hana	160/45/09	Dewanraya Wadihana
Stulang (N45)	Bukit Senyum	160/45/10	Kolej Vokasional Tanjung Puteri
Stulang (N45)	Sri Pelangi	160/45/11	SMK Taman Pelangi
Stulang (N45)	Stulang	160/45/12	SM Foon Yew
Stulang (N45)	Taman Sri Setia	160/45/13	SA Taman Pelangi
Stulang (N45)	Lumba Kuda	160/45/14	SMK Dato Jaafar
Stulang (N45)	Bukit Chagar	160/45/15	SMK Dato Jaafar
Stulang (N45)	Desa Majidi	160/45/16	SA Kampung Dato' Sulaiman Menteri
Stulang (N45)	Sri Tebrau (2)	160/45/17	Dewan Serbaguna Sri Tebrau

=== Representation history ===
Members of the Legislative Assembly for Stulang
Assembly	No	Years	Member	Party
Constituency created from Pasir Gudang and Tanjong Puteri
9th	N34	1995-1999	Freddie Long Hoo Hin @ Long Ah Mui (龍莆天)	BN (MCA)
10th	N34	1999-2004	Freddie Long Hoo Hin @ Long Ah Mui (龍莆天)	BN (MCA)
11th	N45	2004-2008	Freddie Long Hoo Hin @ Long Ah Mui (龍莆天)	BN (MCA)
12th	N45	2008-2013	Mok Chek Hou (莫澤浩)	BN (MCA)
13th	N45	2013–2018	Andrew Chen Kah Eng (曾笳恩)	PR (DAP)
14th	N45	2018-2022	Andrew Chen Kah Eng (曾笳恩)	PH (DAP)
15th	N45	2022–2026	Andrew Chen Kah Eng (曾笳恩)	PH (DAP)
16th	N45	2026-present	Andrew Chen Kah Eng (曾笳恩)	PH (DAP)

== Election results ==
Johor state election, 2026
Party	Candidate	Votes	%	∆%
PH	Andrew Chen Kah Eng	17,560	47.32	▲2.48
BN	Bong Seng Heng	16,937	45.64	▲11.08
BERSAMA	Stanley Tan Boon Heng	1,372	3.70	▲3.70
PN	Lim Chin Eng	1,238	3.34	▼10.25
Total valid votes		37,107	100.00	
Total rejected ballots		394		
Unreturned ballots		23		
Turnout		37,524	62.51	▲15.48
Registered electors		60,029		
Majority		623	1.68	▼8.60
PH hold		Swing		?

Johor state election, 2022
Party	Candidate	Votes	%	∆%
PH	Andrew Chen Kah Eng	12,499	44.84	▼22.71
BN	Ang Boon Heng	9,633	34.56	▲2.11
PN	Youis Yap	3,789	13.59	▲13.59
PBM	Saiful Bahari	1,359	4.88	▲4.88
Independent	Moharam Baharom	594	2.13	▲2.13
Total valid votes		27,874	100.00	
Total rejected ballots		432		
Unreturned ballots		184		
Turnout		28,490	47.03	▼32.66
Registered electors		60,577		
Majority		2,866	10.28	▼24.81
PH hold		Swing		

Johor state election, 2018
Party	Candidate	Votes	%	∆%
PKR	Andrew Chen Kah Eng	24,002	67.55	▲13.01
BN	Ang Boon Heng	11,532	32.45	▼13.01
Total valid votes		35,534	100.00	
Total rejected ballots		678		
Unreturned ballots		90		
Turnout		36,302	79.70	▼2.74
Registered electors		45,551		
Majority		12,470	35.09	▲26.01
PKR hold		Swing		-

Johor state election, 2013
Party	Candidate	Votes	%	∆%
DAP	Andrew Chen Kah Eng	19,799	54.54	▲19.21
BN	Chong Chee Siong	16,503	45.46	▼11.51
Total valid votes		36,302	100.00	
Total rejected ballots		625		
Unreturned ballots		71		
Turnout		36,998	82.44	▲12.36
Registered electors		44,879		
Majority		3,296	9.08	▼12.56
DAP gain from BN		Swing		-

Johor state election, 2008
Party	Candidate	Votes	%	∆%
BN	Mok Chek Hou	16,273	56.97	▼22.33
PR	Norman Fernandez	10,092	35.33	▲14.63
Parti Rakyat Malaysia	Song Sing Kwee	2,198	7.70	▲7.70
Total valid votes		28,563	100.00	
Total rejected ballots		770		
Unreturned ballots		565		
Turnout		29,898	70.08	▲1.19
Registered electors		42,663		
Majority		6,181	21.64	▼36.96
BN hold		Swing		

Johor state election, 2004
Party	Candidate	Votes	%	∆%
BN	Freddie Long Hoo Hin	22,659	79.30	▲2.72
DAP	Norman Fernandez	5,914	20.70	▼2.72
Total valid votes		28,573	100.00	
Total rejected ballots		741		
Unreturned ballots		658		
Turnout		29,972	68.89	▼2.39
Registered electors		43,510		
Majority		16,745	58.60	▲5.44
BN hold		Swing		

Johor state election, 1999
Party	Candidate	Votes	%	∆%
BN	Freddie Long Hoo Hin	21,213	76.58	▲6.19
DAP	Tey Tian Foo	6,486	23.42	▲7.57
Total valid votes		27,699	100.00	
Total rejected ballots		1,236		
Unreturned ballots		683		
Turnout		29,618	71.27	▲0.04
Registered electors		41,557		
Majority		14,727	53.17	▼1.37
BN hold		Swing		

Johor state election, 1995
Party	Candidate	Votes	%
BN	Freddie Long Hoo Hin	18,727	70.39
DAP	Yap Kok Sin	4,216	15.85
PAS	Abdul Razak Ahmad	3,662	13.76
Total valid votes		26,605	100.00
Total rejected ballots		868	
Unreturned ballots		342	
Turnout		27,815	71.23
Registered electors		39,049	
Majority		14,511	54.54
This was a new constituency created.
