= Pending (state constituency) =

State constituency in Sarawak, Malaysia

Pending (N10)
Sarawak constituency

State constituency
- Legislature: Sarawak State Legislative Assembly
MLA
Vacant
- Constituency created: 1987
- First contested: 1991
- Last contested: 2026

Demographics
- Electors (2021): 28,913

Pending (Ear in English) is a state constituency in Sarawak, Malaysia, that has been represented in the Sarawak State Legislative Assembly since 1991.

The state constituency was created in the 1987 redistribution and is mandated to return a single member to the Sarawak State Legislative Assembly under the first past the post voting system.

== Demographics ==
Ethnic breakdown of Pending's electorate as of 2022
1. Chinese (87.1%)
2. Sarawak bumiputera (6.40%)
3. Malay-Muslim bumiputera (5.70%)
4. Other ethnicities (0.80%)

== History ==
As of 2020, Pending has a population of 37,057 people.

=== Polling districts ===
According to the gazette issued on 31 October 2022, the Pending constituency has a total of 7 polling districts.

State constituency	Polling Districts	Code	Location
Pending (N10)	Pending	195/10/01	SJK (C) Chung Hua Pending; SMK Pending; SJK (C) Bintawa
Pending (N10)	Foochow	195/10/02	SM Chung Hua No.1; SM Chung Hua No.3; SK Tabuan Ulu
Pending (N10)	Kenyalang	195/10/03	SK Kenyalang
Pending (N10)	Supreme	195/10/04	SMK Bandar Kuching No.1 (Blok A)
Pending (N10)	Chong Kiun Kong	195/11/05	Dewan Masyarakat (KPCA)
Pending (N10)	Chawan	195/10/06	SJK (C) Chung Hua No.5
Pending (N10)	Simpang Tiga	195/10/07	SMK Bandar Kuching No.1 (Blok B)

=== Representation history ===
Members of the Legislative Assembly for Pending
Assembly	No	Years	Member	Party
Constituency created from Padungan and Stampin
13th	N08	1991-1996	Sim Kheng Hui (沈慶煇)	BN (SUPP)
14th	N09	1996–2001	Sim Kheng Hui (沈慶煇)	BN (SUPP)
15th	N09	2001–2006	Sim Kheng Hui (沈慶煇)	BN (SUPP)
16th	N10	2006-2011	Violet Yong Wui Wui (杨薇讳)	PR (DAP)
17th	N10	2011–2016	Violet Yong Wui Wui (杨薇讳)	PR (DAP)
18th	N10	2016–2021	Violet Yong Wui Wui (杨薇讳)	PH (DAP)
19th	N10	2021–2026	Violet Yong Wui Wui (杨薇讳)	PH (DAP)

== Election results ==
Sarawak state election, 2026
Party	Candidate	Votes	%	∆%
GPS				▲
DAP	Violet Yong Wui Wui			▲
PBK	Chiang Chen Kiat			▲
Total valid votes				
Total rejected ballots				
Unreturned ballots				
Turnout				
Registered electors				
Majority				

Sarawak state election, 2021
Party	Candidate	Votes	%	∆%
DAP	Violet Yong Wui Wui	5,188	40.29	▼22.31
GPS	Milton Foo Tiang Wee	4,648	36.10	▲36.10
PSB	Tan Kay Hok	1,858	14.43	▲14.43
PBK	Patrick Teo Kuang Kim	978	7.60	▲7.60
ASPIRASI	Chang Chee Hiong	204	1.58	▲1.58
Total valid votes		12,876	100.00	
Total rejected ballots		105		
Unreturned ballots		37		
Turnout		13,018	45.02	▼20.70
Registered electors		28,913		
Majority		540	4.19	▼21.01
DAP hold		Swing		
Source(s) https://lom.agc.gov.my/ilims/upload/portal/akta/outputp/1718688/PUB687.pdf

Sarawak state election, 2016
Party	Candidate	Votes	%	∆%
DAP	Violet Yong Wui Wui	12,454	62.60	▼5.35
BN	Milton Foo Tiang Wee	7,442	37.40	▲5.35
Total valid votes		19,896	100.00	
Total rejected ballots		125		
Unreturned ballots		17		
Turnout		20,038	65.72	▼6.55
Registered electors		30,488		
Majority		5,012	25.19	▼10.72
DAP hold		Swing		
Source(s) "Federal Government Gazette - Notice of Contested Election, State Legislative Assembly of the State of Sarawak [P.U. (B) 190/2016]" (PDF). Attorney General's Chambers of Malaysia. 25 April 2016. Archived from the original (PDF) on 12 June 2017. "Senarai Calon yang Disahkan Layak Bertanding Pilihan Raya Dewan Undangan Negeri ke-11". Election Commission of Malaysia. 25 April 2016. Archived from the original on 25 April 2016.

Sarawak state election, 2011
Party	Candidate	Votes	%	∆%
DAP	Violet Yong Wui Wui	14,375	67.95	▲6.38
BN	Sim Kui Hian	6,780	32.05	▼6.38
Total valid votes		21,155	100.00	
Total rejected ballots		119		
Unreturned ballots		36		
Turnout		21,310	72.27	▲7.19
Registered electors		29,488		
Majority		7,595	35.90	▲12.76
DAP hold		Swing		
Source(s) "Federal Government Gazette - Results of Contested Election and Statements of the Poll after the Official Addition of Votes Sarawak [P.U. (B) 245/2011]" (PDF). Attorney General's Chambers of Malaysia. 29 April 2011.

Sarawak state election, 2006
Party	Candidate	Votes	%	∆%
DAP	Violet Yong Wui Wui	11,632	61.57	▲40.85
BN	Sim Kheng Hui	7,260	38.43	▼24.28
Total valid votes		18,892	100.00	
Total rejected ballots		94		
Unreturned ballots		217		
Turnout		19,203	65.08	▼1.23
Registered electors		29,503		
Majority		4,372	23.14	▼18.86
DAP gain from BN		Swing		?

Sarawak state election, 2001
Party	Candidate	Votes	%	∆%
BN	Sim Kheng Hui	11,918	62.71	▼7.58
DAP	Voon Lee Shan	3,937	20.72	▲20.72
PKR	Ng Kim Ho	3,150	16.57	▲16.57
Total valid votes		19,005	100.00	
Total rejected ballots		141		
Unreturned ballots		149		
Turnout		19,295	66.31	▲5.08
Registered electors		29,097		
Majority		7,981	42.00	▲1.42
BN hold		Swing		

Sarawak state election, 1996
Party	Candidate	Votes	%	∆%
BN	Sim Kheng Hui	11,494	70.29	▲3.81
Independent	Ting Kee Kai	4,858	29.71	▲29.71
Total valid votes		16,352	100.00	
Total rejected ballots		136		
Unreturned ballots		53		
Turnout		16,541	61.23	▼9.72
Registered electors		27,016		
Majority		6,636	40.58	▲7.62
BN hold		Swing		

Sarawak state election, 1991
Party	Candidate	Votes	%
BN	Sim Kheng Hui	11,170	66.48
DAP	Cheng Hui Hong	5,633	33.52
Total valid votes		16,803	100.00
Total rejected ballots		90	
Unreturned ballots		46	
Turnout		16,939	70.95
Registered electors		23,873	
Majority		5,537	32.95
This was a new constituency created.
