= Andrew Chen Kah Eng =

Malaysian politician

Yang Berhomat Tuan Andrew Chen Kah Eng MLA
- 曾笳恩
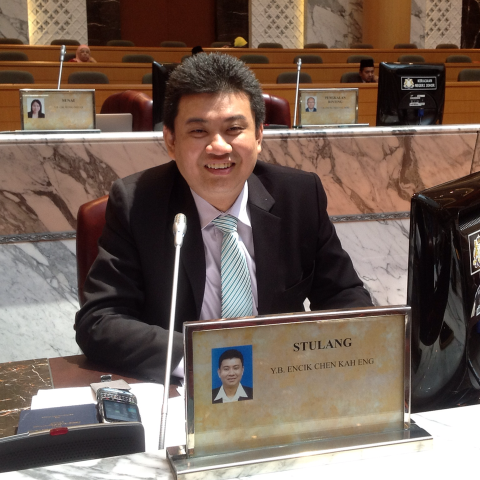
- Andrew Chen Kah Eng, in 2013

State Leader of the Balancing Force of Johor
- Incumbent
- Assumed office 20 March 2023
- Monarch: Ibrahim Iskandar
- Menteri Besar: Onn Hafiz Ghazi
- Preceded by: Himself (State Leader of the Opposition of Johor)
- Constituency: Stulang

State Leader of the Opposition of Johor
- In office 11 December 2022 – 20 March 2023
- Monarch: Ibrahim Iskandar
- Menteri Besar: Onn Hafiz Ghazi
- Preceded by: Liew Chin Tong
- Succeeded by: Himself (State Leader of the Balancing Force of Johor)
- Constituency: Stulang

Member of the Johor State Legislative Assembly for Stulang
- Incumbent
- Assumed office 5 May 2013
- Preceded by: Mok Chek Hou (BN–MCA)
- Majority: 3,296 (2013); 12,470 (2018); 2,866 (2022); 623 (2026)

Chairman of Special Task Force on the Issue of Traffic Congestion in the Sultan Iskandar Building and Immigration and Quarantine Complex
- In office July 2018 – January 2019
- Monarch: Ibrahim Iskandar
- Menteri Besar: Osman Sapian
- Preceded by: Position established
- Succeeded by: Position abolished

State Secretary of the Democratic Action Party of Johor
- Incumbent
- Assumed office 2 May 2021
- Secretary-General: Lim Guan Eng (2021–2022); Anthony Loke Siew Fook (since 2022)
- State Chairman: Liew Chin Tong (2021–2024); Teo Nie Ching (since 2024)
- Assistant: Poh Eng Guan (2021–2024); Ng Siam Luang (since 2024)

Personal details
- Born: Andrew Chen Kah Eng; 13 October 1975 (age 50) Kuching, Sarawak, Malaysia
- Citizenship: Malaysia
- Party: Democratic Action Party (DAP)
- Other political affiliations: Pakatan Rakyat (PR) (2008–2015); Pakatan Harapan (PH) (since 2015)
- Education: University of Technology Malaysia
- Occupation: Politician

Andrew Chen Kah Eng (Chinese: 曾笳恩; pinyin: Zēng Jiā'ēn) is a Malaysian politician from the Democratic Action Party (DAP), a component party of the Pakatan Harapan (PH) and formerly Pakatan Rakyat (PR) coalitions who has served as Leader of the Balancing Force of Johor from March 2023 until June 2026, and the Member of the Johor State Legislative Assembly (MLA) for Stulang since May 2013. He served as State Leader of the Opposition of Johor from December 2022 to March 2023 and Chairman of Special Task Force on the Issue of Traffic Congestion in the Sultan Iskandar Building and Immigration and Quarantine Complex from July 2018 to January 2019. He has also served as State Secretary of DAP of Johor since May 2021.

== Personal life ==
Born in Kuching, Sarawak, he moved to the state of Johor for his university studies in the University of Technology Malaysia. He holds an Honour Degree in Land Surveying and a degree in Master of Science (Satellite Surveying). He is a Roman Catholic, who serves as a lector in the Roman Catholic Cathedral of the Sacred Heart of Jesus, Johor Bahru.

== Political career ==
=== Member of the Johor State Legislative Assembly for Stulang and Member of the Democratic Action Party ===
In the 2013 Johor state election, Chen was nominated by the Democratic Action Party (DAP), then component party of the Pakatan Rakyat (PR) opposition coalition to contest for the Stulang state seat and won the state seat with 19,799 votes by defeating Chong Chee Siong of the Malaysian Chinese Association (MCA), a component party of the ruling Barisan Nasional (BN) coalition with 3,296 votes of majority.

In the 2018 Johor state election, Chen was renominated by DAP, a component party of a new Pakatan Harapan (PH) opposition coalition to defend the Stulang state seat. He went on to win the seat again with 24,002 votes by defeating Ang Boon Heng of MCA and BN with a significantly increased majority of 12,470 votes. PH also defeated BN in the election and the first change of government happened with PH replacing BN to form the new state government after being elected democratically. However, as an MLA of PH, Chen was not appointed Member of the Johor State Executive Council (EXCO), the executive body of the Johor state government.

In the 2021 Johor DAP election, he was elected into the Johor DAP committee as a member and was subsequently appointed new secretary of the committee by Liew Chin Tong, who also made into the committee after receiving third highest number of votes of 561 after Yeo Bee Yin (631) and Teo Nie Ching (531) and was reappointed the chairman.

In the 2022 Johor state election, Chen was again renominated by DAP and PH, again an opposition coalition after its collapse of state government in February 2020, to defend the Stulang state seat. He went on to win the seat again with 12,499 votes by defeating all of his opponents Ang Boon Heng of MCA and BN who challenged him again, Yap Chiang Youis of Perikatan Nasional (PN) and Parti Gerakan Rakyat Malaysia (GERAKAN), Saiful Bahari Sahari of Parti Bangsa Malaysia (PBM) and independent Moharam Baharom with a dramatically decreased majority of 2,866 votes. PH was defeated by BN and the latter was reelected to form the state government of Johor.

In 2026 a snap state election was called. The Stulang state seat faced a four-cornered contest and Chen successfully defended his seat once again with a majority of 623.

=== Chairman of Special Task Force on the Issues of Traffic Congestion in the Sultan Iskandar Building and Immigration and Quarantine Complex ===
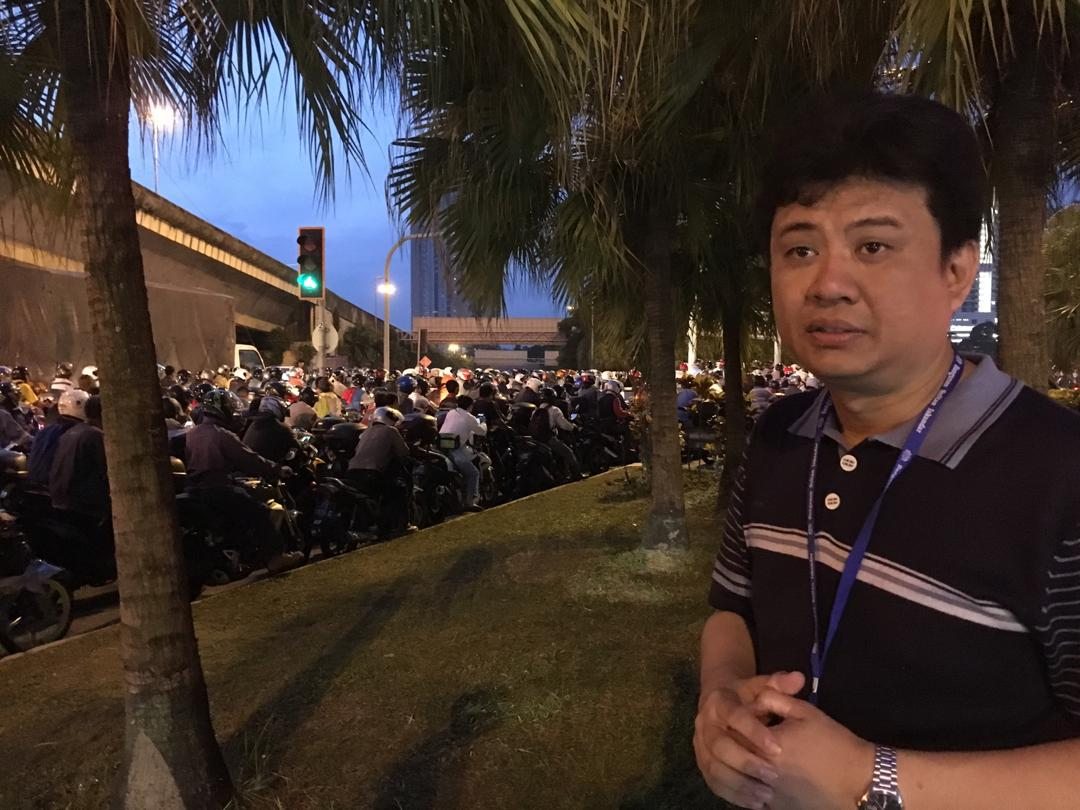
Andrew Chen inspecting the jam situation for motorcyclists at 6am, 4 October 2018.

In July 2018, Andrew was appointed by the Johor State Government to lead a special task force to look into the traffic congestion issues in the Sultan Iskandar Building (BSI) customs, immigration and quarantine (CIQ) complex.

The study took the special task force four months to complete, and a report was submitted in January 2019.

In the report, the special task force made 11 recommendations on how to ease the traffic congestion. The 11 recommendations are:

1. Setting up a single agency at the CIQ to reduce bureaucracy in the management of the border checkpoint
2. Increase the number of immigration officers during peak hours
3. Combining the immigration, road charge and PLUS counters into a single counter for the clearance of inbound cars
4. Improve the Malaysia Automated Clearance System (MACS) and increase the number of E-Gates for inbound passenger hall, and readjust the algorithm of the Secured Automated Clearance System (MBIKE) for inbound Malaysian motorcyclists.
5. Minimise and eventually abolish top-up transactions for Touch ’n Go cards at the inbound car lanes within a year
6. Consult Singapore authorities about increasing the frequency of the Johor Bahru-Woodlands train service, extend the bus services until 1 am, encourage transport operations from both countries to provide shuttle services along the causeway, and make Touch ’n Go top-up transactions available in Singapore
7. Limit the time a factory bus can stop at the complex and rearrange the parking bays for the factory vans and buses
8. Place light-emitting diode signages at the A, B, C and D zones for the inbound cars to avoid bottleneck. Place The People's Volunteer Corps (Rela) and auxiliary police personnel to help control traffic. Ensure the number of counters opened in zones A and B are the same as in zone C and D
9. Improve the online ticketing system for Keretapi Tanah Melayu Bhd's Tebrau train service
10. Make sure the Rapid Transit System Link becomes a reality, while following up on proposals such as the Malaysia-Singapore Third Crossing, travelator and pedestrian walkways for the causeway, and diverting all heavy vehicles to the Second Link
11. Use big data and artificial intelligence for border checks and optimise the sharing of data among all agencies at the complex. Identify the patterns and norms of users to plan ahead and forecast incidents

=== Cross Border Breastmilk Delivery ===
On 18 March 2020, the Malaysia government enforced a Movement Control Order (MCO) to curb the spread of COVID-19. The order included strict travel restrictions between Malaysia and Singapore, where many Malaysians travel to for work and social visit purposes. Since citizens from both countries were not allowed to travel freely anymore many Malaysian mothers, who are employed in Singapore, had no means to bring back their breastmilk to their babies in Malaysia. Prior to MCO, these mothers travelled regularly between the two countries to bring back the breastmilk themselves.

When approached by these mothers for help, Andrew decided to make all the necessary arrangements to assist them in bringing back their breastmilk to babies all across peninsula Malaysia.

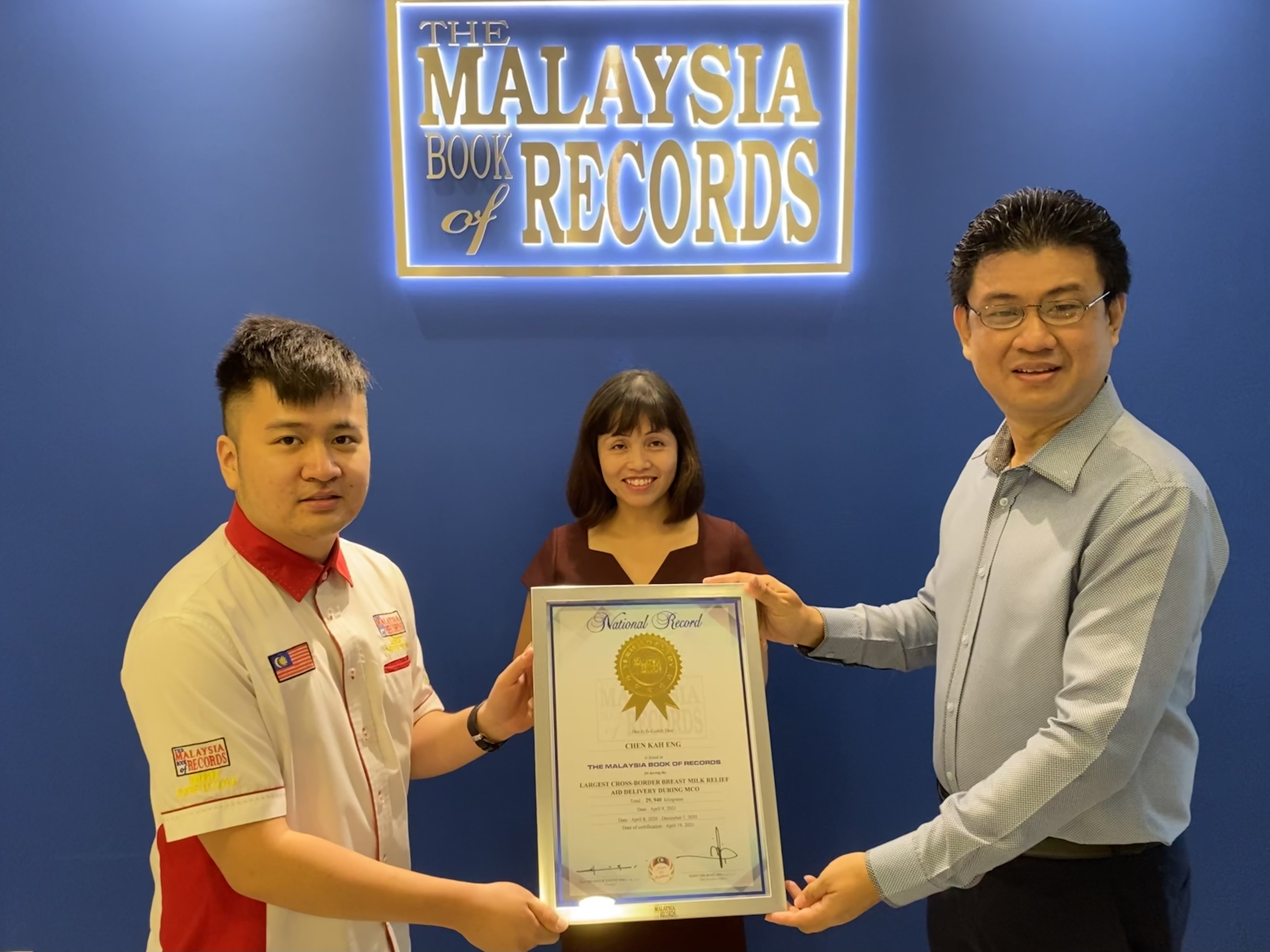
Andrew being presented with the Malaysia Book Of Records (witnessed by Teo Nie Ching).

=== Malaysia Book Of Records ===
On 19 April 2021, for his contribution in the cross border breast milk delivery, Andrew was presented with a Malaysia Book Of Records for the Largest Cross-Border Breast Milk Relief Aid Delivery During MCO.

The presentation was witnessed by MP for Kulai, Teo Nie Ching.

=== Special Bus Transportation Arrangement for the Vulnerable ===
The sudden implementation of the MCO also meant that many elderly, children and pregnant ladies were not able to travel back to Malaysia in time before the enforcement started. As part of the travel restriction, all land public transport services between the two countries were suspended indefinitely. Therefore, while Malaysians were still able to return to Malaysia, people in the vulnerable group faced difficulties travelling back as the only way was to walk across the causeway.

To assist them Andrew, with the help of private bus operators and the High Commission of Malaysia in Singapore, managed to arrange special bus transportation arrangement for them.

In total, 4 such arrangements were made, and more than 200 vulnerable people successfully travelled back to Malaysia safely.

=== Gazette Shortcut Proposal ===
On 17 May 2024, Andrew urged the gazetting of a pedestrian shortcut near the Bangunan Sultan Iskandar (BSI) Customs, Immigration, and Quarantine Complex in Johor Bahru as a third entrance. The proposed shortcut aims to alleviate heavy traffic at existing entrances and cater to pedestrians, including pregnant women and senior citizens. Andrew emphasized the need for collaboration among various government agencies to enhance security and infrastructure for the shortcut.

== Election results ==
Johor State Legislative Assembly
Year	Constituency	Candidate	Votes	Pct	Opponent(s)	Votes	Pct	Ballots cast	Majority	Turnout
2013	N45 Stulang	Andrew Chen Kah Eng (DAP)	19,799	54.54%	Chong Chee Siong (MCA)	16,503	45.46%	36,302	3,296	82.40%
2018	N45 Stulang	Andrew Chen Kah Eng (DAP)	24,002	67.55%	Ang Boon Heng (MCA)	11,532	32.45%	35,534	12,470	78.01%
2022	N45 Stulang	Andrew Chen Kah Eng (DAP)	12,499	44.84%	Ang Boon Heng (MCA)	9,633	34.56%	27,874	2,866	46.01%
2022	N45 Stulang	Andrew Chen Kah Eng (DAP)	12,499	44.84%	Youis Yap (GERAKAN)	3,789	13.59%	27,874	2,866	46.01%
2022	N45 Stulang	Andrew Chen Kah Eng (DAP)	12,499	44.84%	Saiful Bahari Sahari (PBM)	1,359	4.88%	27,874	2,866	46.01%
2022	N45 Stulang	Andrew Chen Kah Eng (DAP)	12,499	44.84%	Moharam Baharom (IND)	594	2.13%	27,874	2,866	46.01%
2026	N45 Stulang	Andrew Chen Kah Eng (DAP)	17,560	47.32%	Bong Seng Heng (MCA)	16,937	45.64%	37,107	623	61.82%
2026	N45 Stulang	Andrew Chen Kah Eng (DAP)	17,560	47.32%	Stanley Tan (BERSAMA)	1,372	3.70%	37,107	623	61.82%
2026	N45 Stulang	Andrew Chen Kah Eng (DAP)	17,560	47.32%	Lim Chin Eng (BERSATU)	1,238	3.34%	37,107	623	61.82%
