= The Rocket (Malaysian magazine) =

Monthly political magazine in Malaysia

- Categories: Political magazine
- Frequency: Monthly
- Founded: 1966
- Country: Malaysia
- Website: The Rocket

The Rocket is a monthly political news magazine published in Malaysia. Founded in 1966, it is one of the oldest magazines in the country. Subtitled as "From Malaysians for Malaysians", it is also one of the alternative media outlets of Malaysia.

== History and profile ==
The Rocket was founded in 1966. The magazine is affiliated with Democratic Action Party. Although it was started as a publication aimed at the general public, the Malaysian government restricted its sale to party members, because one of the major funds for the party was revenue from sales of The Rocket. Following this regulation, it has been sold only to party members.

Since its establishment, The Rocket has been subject to bans. For instance, on 22 May 1969, the magazine and other political party publications were temporarily banned in Malaysia. In the late 1990s, it was again temporarily closed. In 2010, the renewal of the publishing permits of the magazine and of other opposition publications was delayed.

The Rocket is published on a monthly basis. The magazine has Malay, Chinese and English editions. The circulation of The Rocket sharply decreased following the Malaysian general election in 1990.
