= 2013 Democratic Action Party leadership election =

A leadership election was held by the Democratic Action Party (DAP) of Malaysia on 29 September 2013.

== Central Executive Committee election results ==
Candidate	Delegates' votes (max. 20)
Liew Chin Tong	1,438 votes
Lim Kit Siang	1,436 votes
Karpal Singh	1,421 votes
Gobind Singh Deo	1,409 votes
Lim Guan Eng	1,304 votes
Chong Chieng Jen	1,294 votes
Anthony Loke Siew Fook	1,263 votes
Chow Kon Yeow	1,203 votes
Fong Kui Lun	1,193 votes
Teng Chang Khim	1,164 votes
Tony Pua Kiam Wee	1,158 votes
Zairil Khir Johari	1,132 votes
Teresa Kok Suh Sim	1,127 votes
Chong Eng	1,111 votes
Kulasegaran Murugeson	1,088 votes
Tan Kok Wai	1,088 votes
Teo Nie Ching	1,081 votes
Boo Cheng Hau	961 votes
Nga Kor Ming	956 votes
Ngeh Koo Ham	809 votes
