= Kamache Doray Rajoo =

Malaysian politician

Member of the Pahang State Legislative Assembly for Sabai
- In office 5 May 2013 – 19 December 2022
- Preceded by: Davendran Murthy (BN–MIC)
- Succeeded by: Arumugam Veerappa Pillai (BN–MIC)
- Majority: 117 (2013); 495 (2018)

Personal details
- Born: 9 February 1970 (age 56)
- Party: Democratic Action Party (DAP) (–2023); Independent (2023–present)
- Other political affiliations: Pakatan Rakyat (PR) (2008–2015); Pakatan Harapan (PH) (2015–2023)
- Occupation: Politician

Kamache s/o A. Doray Rajoo (born 9 February 1970) is a Malaysian politician who served as Member of the Pahang State Legislative Assembly (MLA) for Sabai from May 2013 to December 2022. She is an independent politician since 2023 and was a member of Democratic Action Party (DAP), a component party of Pakatan Harapan (PH).

She quit DAP in 2023.

== Health ==
Kamache Doray Rajoo was test positive for COVID-19 in 2021.

== Election results ==
Pahang State Legislative Assembly
Year	Constituency	Candidate	Votes	Pct	Opponent(s)	Votes	Pct	Ballots cast	Majority	Turnout
2008	N35 Sabai	Kamache Doray Rajoo (DAP)	3,159	48.88%	Davendran Murthy (MIC)	3,304	51.12%	6,716	145	70.80%
2013	N35 Sabai	Kamache Doray Rajoo (DAP)	4,439	50.67%	Goonasakaren Raman (MIC)	4,322	49.33%	9,006	117	82.87%
2018	N35 Sabai	Kamache Doray Rajoo (DAP)	4,374	44.75%	Goonasakaren Raman (MIC)	3,879	39.68%	9,891	495	82.62%
2018	N35 Sabai	Kamache Doray Rajoo (DAP)	4,374	44.75%	Mohd Khairuddin Abdullah (PAS)	1,308	13.38%	9,891	495	82.62%
2018	N35 Sabai	Kamache Doray Rajoo (DAP)	4,374	44.75%	Karunaneethi Thangavel (IND)	145	1.48%	9,891	495	82.62%
2022	N35 Sabai	Kamache Doray Rajoo (DAP)	4,348	36.71%	Arumugam Veerappa Pillai (MIC)	4,444	37.52%	12,005	96	76.74%
2022	N35 Sabai	Kamache Doray Rajoo (DAP)	4,348	36.71%	Nurul Qomar Abdol Talin (BERSATU)	3,053	25.77%	12,005	96	76.74%
