= Violet Yong =

Malaysian lawyer and politician

Yang Berhormat Puan Violet Yong Wui Wui MLA
- 杨薇讳

Faction represented in Sarawak State Legislative Assembly
- 2006–2018: Democratic Action Party
- 2018–: Pakatan Harapan

Personal details
- Born: 4 April 1977 (age 49)
- Citizenship: Malaysian
- Party: Democratic Action Party (DAP)
- Other political affiliations: Pakatan Rakyat (PR); Pakatan Harapan (PH)
- Education: University of Melbourne, Australia
- Occupation: Politician, Lawyer
- Website: violetyong.blogspot.com www.facebook.com/violet.yong.1

Violet Yong Wui Wui (simplified Chinese: 杨薇讳; traditional Chinese: 楊薇諱; pinyin: Yáng Wēihuì) is a Malaysian lawyer and politician from the Democratic Action Party (DAP), a component party of the Pakatan Harapan (PH) opposition coalition. She has served as Member of the Sarawak State Legislative Assembly (MLA) for Pending since May 2006. She is also one of the only two Sarawak PH and DAP MLAs along with Chong Chieng Jen.

== Education ==
Yong is a holder of Bachelor of Laws from University of Melbourne, Australia.

== Legal career ==
Yong is a practicing lawyer at Messrs Chong Brothers Advocates, Kuching.

== Political career ==
Yong's initiation to politics began as a child. As a first-hand witness to politics, she tagged along with her parents, active DAP members, to party activities and while they helped with canvassing during state elections.

Yong joined the Democratic Action Party at the age of 29 after graduating from Melbourne. In early 2005, some party leaders in the state lobbied for her to be a candidate.

Her big win came in the 2006 Sarawak state election when she won the seat of Pending (state constituency), which was considered to be an SUPP-BN stronghold since 1991. From then on, she has continued to gain substantial majority in the ensuing state elections for her constituency.

Within her political party, she also heads the Women's Affairs department.

Yong is sometimes associated with the moniker "Cili Padi" or Bird's eye chilli in English due to her pluckiness at voicing out problems and issues affecting the people.

=== Sarawak State Election, 2006 ===
Yong pulled off one of the biggest upsets in the 2006 Sarawak state election when she defeated SUPP secretary general Datuk Sim Kheng Hui with a majority of 4,372 votes. Before he was defeated in 2006, Datuk Sim had been assemblyman of Pending (state constituency) since 1991.

=== Sarawak State Election, 2011 ===
In the 2011 Sarawak state election, Yong received 14,375 votes and won with a majority of 7,595 votes. She defeated Dr. Sim Kui Hian from SUPP under Barisan Nasional who received 6,780 votes.

=== Sarawak State Election, 2016 ===
In the 2016 Sarawak state election, Violet Yong won the seat of N10 Pending (state constituency) for a third term against incoming SUPP candidate Milton Foo Tiang Wee.

=== Sarawak State Election, 2021 ===
In the 2021 Sarawak state election, Violet Yong again won the seat of Pending for the fourth consecutive term against Gabungan Parti Sarawak (GPS) candidate. However, her party and coalition, DAP and PH suffered its worst defeat and performed most poorly in the electoral history, winning only two state seats, another being Padungan by Chong Chieng Jen of DAP. The two other PH component parties, People's Justice Party (PKR) and National Trust Party (AMANAH) were defeated in all seats they had contested.

== Issues raised ==
In November 2014, Violet demanded that the Second Minister for Resource Planning and Environment, Datuk Amar Awang Tengah Ali Hasan, should resign because the latter had failed to curb illegal logging in the state. She also added that "If I were the minister, I would have resigned and felt ashamed of myself and do not know where to hide my face." and "If I were the minister in charge of this portfolio in Japan, I would have killed myself." Violet was referred for disciplinary action to the Committee of Privilege, for making such an allegation.

Violet was ejected from the Sarawak state assembly on 20 October 2026 for refusing to retract her statement against Lee Kim Shin for calling the latter a "political coward". This was because Lee had initiated a motion resulting in the suspension of her colleague Chong Chieng Jen from the state assembly on 15 October 2026.

== Election results ==
Sarawak State Legislative Assembly
Year	Constituency	Candidate	Votes	Pct	Opponent(s)	Votes	Pct	Ballots casts	Majority	Turnout
2006	Pending	Violet Yong Wui Wui (DAP)	11,632	61.57%	Sim Kheng Hui (SUPP)	7,260	38.43%	18,892	4,372	19,203
2011	Pending	Violet Yong Wui Wui (DAP)	14,375	67.95%	Sim Kui Hian (SUPP)	6,780	32.05%	21,155	7,595	21,310
2016	Pending	Violet Yong Wui Wui (DAP)	12,454	62.60%	Milton Foo Tiang Wee (SUPP)	7,442	37.40%	19,896	5,012	20,038
2021	Pending	Violet Yong Wui Wui (DAP)	5,188	40.29%	Milton Foo Tiang Wee (SUPP)	4,648	36.10	12,876	540	29,747

== See also ==
- Pending (state constituency)
