= Democratic Action Party =

Malaysian political party

Democratic Action Party: Parti Tindakan Demokratik (Malay); 民主行动党 (Chinese); Mínzhǔ Xíngdòng Dǎng; ஜனநாயக செயல் கட்சி (Tamil); Jaṉanāyaka Ceyal Kaṭci
- Abbreviation: DAP
- National Chairman: Gobind Singh Deo
- National Deputy Chairman: Nga Kor Ming
- National Vice-Chairman: Chong Chieng Jen; Teo Nie Ching; Ng Suee Lim; Syahredzan Johan; Arul Kumar Jambunathan
- Secretary-General: Anthony Loke Siew Fook
- Deputy Secretary-General: Steven Sim Chee Keong; Hannah Yeoh; Ramkarpal Singh
- Founders: Chen Man Hin; Devan Nair
- Founded: 11 October 1965; 61 years ago
- Legalised: 18 March 1966; 60 years ago
- Split from: People's Action Party (Singapore)
- Preceded by: People's Action Party of Malaya
- Headquarters: Jalan Yew, 55100 Kuala Lumpur
- Newspaper: The Rocket; RoketKini
- Student wing: Mahasiswa Roket
- Youth wing: DAP Socialist Youth
- Membership: 173,000 (2019)
- Ideology: Social democracy; Progressivism; Secularism; Multiculturalism
- Political position: Centre-left
- National affiliation: Pakatan Harapan (since 2015) (Note: The party was formerly part of the Malaysian Solidarity Convention (1965–1966), Gagasan Rakyat (1990–1996), Barisan Alternatif (1999–2004), Pakatan Rakyat (2008–2015), and Warisan Plus (2016–2021).); National Unity Government (since 2022)
- Regional affiliation: Network of Social Democracy in Asia
- International affiliation: Progressive Alliance (since 2012) (Note: The party was formerly part of Socialist International (1987–2017).)
- Colours: Red; White; Blue
- Slogan: Malaysian Malaysia; Malaysian First
- Anthem: Berjuang Untuk Rakyat Malaysia! (Fighting for the Malaysian People!)
- Dewan Negara: 8 / 70
- Dewan Rakyat: 40 / 222
- Dewan Undangan Negeri: 80 / 612
- Chief minister of states: 1 / 13

Election symbol

Party flag

Website
- www.dapmalaysia.org

The Democratic Action Party (DAP; Malay: Parti Tindakan Demokratik) is a social democratic political party in Malaysia, sitting on the centre-left of the political spectrum. As one of three component parties of the Pakatan Harapan (PH) coalition, it formed the federal government after defeating Barisan Nasional (BN) in the 2018 Malaysian general election, ending the party's 53 year-long stay in the opposition. However, before the coalition finished its first term, defections from partnering parties caused it to lose power after 22 months, culminating in the 2020 Malaysian political crisis. At the 2022 Malaysian general election, the PH coalition which the DAP was part of was returned to power again, albeit without a majority, leading it to form a unity coalition government with its traditional political rivals.

The DAP was founded in 1965 by Malaya–based members of the Singaporean People's Action Party (PAP), Chen Man Hin and Devan Nair, shortly after Singapore's expulsion from Malaysia. Singapore's expulsion was in part due to intense ideological differences between the PAP and the federal government, led by the United Malays National Organisation (UMNO). UMNO favoured the idea of Ketuanan Melayu and Malay nationalism for the country. In contrast, the PAP favoured a more egalitarian and civic nationalist Malaysian Malaysia, which the DAP would continue to espouse. Following the expulsion, the PAP was elected as the ruling government of a newly sovereign Singapore and would continue to operate on a platform of civic nationalism. However, unlike the DAP, the PAP became more conservative and moved towards the centre-right.

Historically a democratic socialist party, the DAP draws much of its support from progressive voters with a stable electorate from voters of cities, coastal regions, the middle class, and the working class. The party's strongholds are primarily in the urban and semi-urban areas of Penang, Perak, Selangor, Negeri Sembilan, Johor, Malacca and the Federal Territory of Kuala Lumpur. In the 2018 Malaysian general election, the party contested in 47 federal and 104 state constituencies under the banner of its ally the People's Justice Party, (Note: The party contested under the banner of the People's Justice Party as Pakatan Harapan was yet to be officially registered by the government, meaning its logo could not be used.) winning 42 and 102 seats respectively, except in Sarawak, where the party's state branch chose to contest under its own banner.

== History ==
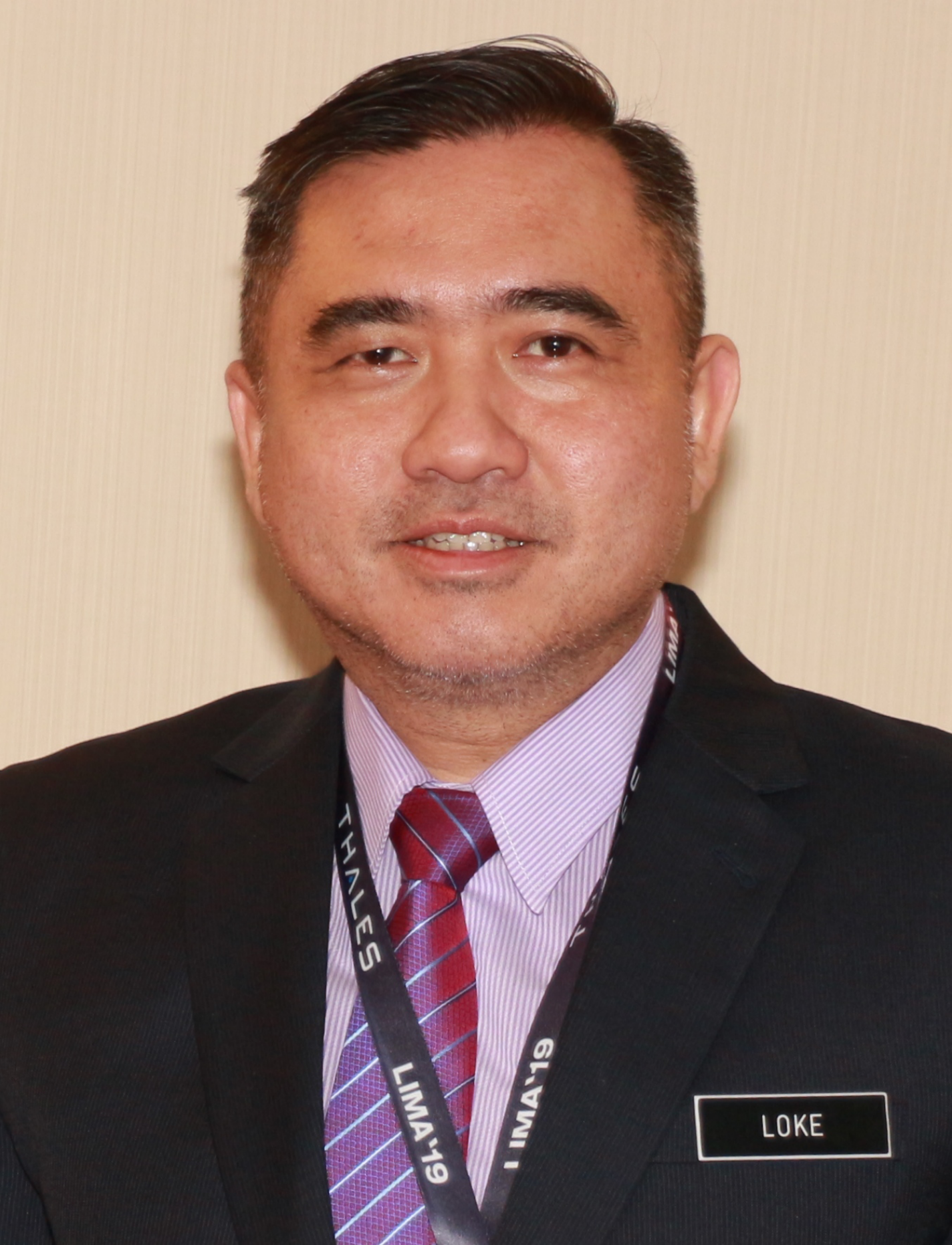
Anthony Loke Siew Fook, Member of Parliament for Seremban and former Member of the Negeri Sembilan State Legislative Assembly for Chennah, has served as the 6th Secretary-General, the most powerful position of the party since March 2022.

=== Formation by ex-PAP members ===
The party is the direct successor of the Peninsular Malayan branch of the Singapore–based People's Action Party (PAP), which was then known as the People's Action Party of Malaya (PAP–M). Singapore's expulsion from Malaysia led to its deregistration in 1965 by the Registrar of Societies (RoS). The deregistered party's leadership consisted of Devan Nair (secretary-general), Chen Man Hin (chairman), D. P. Xavier (assistant secretary-general), Goh Hock Guan (vice-chairman) and Seeveratnam Sinnathamby (treasurer), who was the younger brother of Singapore minister S. Rajaratnam, with Zain Azahari bin Zainal Abidin, Chin Chan Sung, Michael Khong Chye Huat, Tan Chong Bee and Too Chee Cheong as committee members.

On 11 October that year, the name "Democratic Action Party (DAP)" was chosen and officially formed by the remnants of the PAP–M. However, the registration of the party was delayed to 18 March 1966 while the ruling Alliance Party laid out new conditions for the registration of political parties in the Societies Act 1966. While awaiting the party's registration, party chairman Chen Man Hin won the state constituency of Rahang, Negeri Sembilan as an independent in December 1965. In August that year, the official party organ, The Rocket, was first published.

The party adopted the "Setapak Declaration" at the first DAP National Congress held on 29 July 1967, declaring itself "irrevocably committed to the ideal of a free, democratic and socialist Malaysia, based on the principles of racial and religious equality, social and economic justice and founded on the institution of parliamentary democracy", and later joined the Socialist International (SI), participating in the organisation's International Council in Zurich, Switzerland.

=== Early years, 1969 election and crackdown ===
In 1967, the party was involved in discussions to form a united front of opposition parties against the Alliance coalition ahead of the 1969 general election, although these efforts were eventually unsuccessful. In March 1968, the party reached an agreement with the People's Progressive Party (PPP) not to contest against each other in the state of Perak for the upcoming general election. The DAP attempted to achieve a similar arrangement with the United Democratic Party (UDP), whose base was in Penang, but its leader Lim Chong Eu rejected the proposal and sarcastically thanked DAP secretary general Goh Hock Guan for "his very smug condescension." Later that same month, the newly formed Parti Gerakan Rakyat Malaysia (Gerakan) led by Syed Hussein Alatas suggested that the DAP merge into the new party, an offer that was declined.

Devan Nair, the co-founder of the DAP, returned to Singapore in 1969 after being withdrawn as a candidate for the general election that year. Lee Kuan Yew, at the time the Prime Minister of Singapore, explained in 1981 that "the Cabinet decided that Singapore–Malaysia relations would always be bedevilled if Devan Nair remained a DAP leader. I persuaded him to come back". Nair eventually became the President of Singapore from 1981 to 1985. Eventually, the DAP contested a general election for the first time in 1969 together with both the PPP and Gerakan in an electoral pact but under separate banners. In its campaign, the party opposed Bumiputera privileges guaranteed under Article 153 of the Constitution and continued Lee Kuan Yew's call for a "Malaysian Malaysia", which irked many Malay ultras. The "Malaysian Malaysia" idea was originally conveyed by Lee in the Dewan Rakyat prior to Singapore's expulsion: "Malaysia – to whom does it belong? To Malaysians. But who are Malaysians? I hope I am, Mr Speaker, Sir. But sometimes, sitting in this chamber, I doubt whether I am allowed to be a Malaysian".

The election results of 1969 saw the DAP winning 13 parliamentary seats and 31 state assembly seats, securing 11.96% of the valid votes cast. Gerakan also made significant gains, campaigning on a similar platform in Penang in which the Bumiputeras made up a minority of the state. That election represented the largest breakthrough for an opposition party in Malaysia prior to 2008 and came close to unseating the ruling Alliance. However, political rallies that followed triggered racial violence particularly between the Chinese and the Malays, resulting in the 13 May incident which saw hundreds of deaths. Parliament was suspended, and the National Operations Council (NOC) was established to govern the country until 1971. After the 1969 general election, the DAP would never come close to repeating its past successes for the next 38 years. Although the DAP remained a major opposition party, the ruling Alliance coalition and later its successor Barisan Nasional (BN) would clung solidly to its two-thirds parliamentary majority. The DAP, however, continued campaigning on its platform of abolishing the Bumiputera privileges, securing equal rights for all Malaysians and to establishing a democratic socialist state in Malaysia.

=== 1970–2007 ===
The party boycotted the National Consultative Council, a body formed in the aftermath of the 1969 racial riots to "establish positive and practical guidelines for inter-racial co-operation and social integration", in protest of the government's continued detention of its secretary-general, Lim Kit Siang, under the Internal Security Act. Lim had succeeded Goh in the role following the latter's resignation in the aftermath of the 13 May incident, which precipitated a sharp deterioration in relations between the two and precipitated his exit from the party in 1973.

In 1971, secret talks were held between Goh and the Malaysian Chinese Association (MCA) under Tan Siew Sin, where Tan urged the DAP to withdraw its candidate in the Bekok by-election to the Johor legislative assembly as part of a merger so as to strengthen Chinese representation in government and prevent racial polarisation. The talks' existence was leaked to the media, and while a merger of any kind was rejected, it sparked a backlash among the DAP's non-Chinese members. It was also subsequently revealed that Tan had engaged with Lim directly about the possibility of a merger a year prior. This appeared to have directly resulted in the resignation of party vice-president and parliamentary whip Soorian Arjunan, who criticised the party's dedication to multiracialism as a myth.

This period immediately after the 13 May incident also coincided with the party's adoption, under Lim's leadership, of an even more confrontational attitude against the government. It actively opposed the Constitution (Amendment) Act 1971 which allowed for the limitation of freedom of speech concerning specific topics, inclduing Bumiputera privileges, in the interest of public order, and the accompanying amendment to the Sedition Act to that effect. It was the only party aside from the PPP to oppose the latter in parliament.

Over the course of the next few decades, the party would suffer a number of splits and defections, primarily to the MCA and Gerakan. Among the most notable were Yap Pian Hon, who defected to the MCA in 1974. This trend would result in the party's adoption of an anti-"political kangaroos" or "frogs" stance—referring to elected representatives who cross the floor— and support for an "anti-hopping law".

In 1978, the party experienced a split when founding member and Penang state chairman Yeap Ghim Guan left and formed the Socialist Democratic Party following a power struggle against national leadership. Yeap was joined by the entire state party's committee as well as the MP for Petaling Oh Keng Seng. They were later joined by party stalwart Fan Yew Teng, who had served as acting secretary-general while Lim was detained under the Internal Security Act and was the MP for Menglembu. Those who had left the party all labelled Lim's leadership as "dictatorial".

The party suffered more defections in the lead-up to the 1978 Malaysian general election, when one of its most prominent Malay members, Daing Ibrahim Othman, left the party in protest of the leadership's decision to move him to another constituency, which was followed by a number of resignations in Negeri Sembilan for similar reasons.

In 1979, the party gained a presence in Sarawak when several disgruntled SUPP members decided to form a state DAP chapter in the run-up to the 1979 Sarawak state election.

In 1981, Penang once again became the locus for a major split, this time due to conflict between the English- and Chinese-educated factions, with the latter coming to feel that they were being discriminated against for their educational and social background. The inciting event was the 1980 Pengkalan Kota by-election, where the English-educated faction's preferred candidate was chosen and subsequently lost against an MCA candidate. Over the course of the crisis, the party was estimated to have lost as much as 10% of its membership, and would lose three MPs and four members of state legislative assemblies, or MLAs, through expulsions and resignations; the "Gang of Three" of Seow Hun Kim MP and MLA, Chin Nyok Soo MLA, Goh Lin Eam, followed by Chan Teck Chan MP and MLA, Ooi Kan Kwong MLA, and Wong Hoong Keat MP. All of them would go on to join the MCA, with the exception of Ooi, who joined Gerakan.

During the Mahathir administration in 1987, several party leaders including Lim, who was then leader of the opposition, were detained by the government without trial during Operation Lalang, under the accusation of being a national security threat.

In 1995, the party ran what has become widely known as the "Robocop" campaign to wrest Penang from the Barisan Nasional, led by Teoh Teik Huat and Gooi Hock Seng. Despite the hype, the campaign was a failure as the party only won one state and three parliamentary seats. Government personalities and state media used the campaign to ridicule Lim for being a "robot" and "soulless".

Following the ousting of Deputy Prime Minister Anwar Ibrahim in September 1998, DAP co-founded the Barisan Alternatif coalition along with Pan-Malaysian Islamic Party and the newly formed National Justice Party. However, the coalition did not work out very well for the DAP, with two of its top leaders, Lim Kit Siang and Karpal Singh losing their parliamentary seats in the 1999 election; the DAP managed to win only 5% (10 out of 193) of the seats in Parliament. PAS became the leading opposition party in Parliament. It left the coalition in 2001 due to a disagreement with PAS over the issue of an Islamic state.

In the 2004 general election, the DAP managed to capture 12 seats in Parliament, while PAS and Keadilan suffered major setbacks, losing 20 of the 27 it had won in the last election, and losing all but one seat respectively. The eventual outcome saw Lim, who had been elected in his constituency of Ipoh Timur with a majority of 10,000 votes, retaking the position of leader of the opposition.

In the 2006 Sarawak state election, the Democratic Action Party won 6 of the 12 seats it contested and narrowly lost three other seats by small margins, in what was the party's best ever showing in the state since 1979.

=== 2008–2015 ===
Pakatan Rakyat was formed in 2008 by DAP, PKR and PAS. In the 2008 general election, the DAP won 13% (28 out of 222) of the seats in the Dewan Rakyat, with PAS and PKR making substantial gains as well with 23 seats and 31 seats respectively. In total, the taking of 82 seats (37%) by the opposition to Barisan Nasional's 140 seats (63%), makes it the best performance in Malaysian history by the opposition, and denied Barisan Nasional the two-thirds majority required to make constitutional changes in the Dewan Rakyat. DAP advisor Lim Kit Siang expressed surprise at the election results but declared it to be the true power of the voice of the Malaysian people for the leaders of the country to hear them. In addition, DAP, having secured all its contested seats in the state of Penang, formed the Penang state government with its alliance partners PKR and PAS, the Chief Minister being DAP's Lim Guan Eng, son of Lim Kit Siang.

In the 2011 Sarawak state election, DAP furthered its gains from the previous election, winning 12 out of the 70 state assembly seats, with PR winning a total of 15 state seats and 41% of the popular vote. The PR's success was further enhanced in the 2013 general election when DAP went on to win 17% (38 out of 222) of the seats in the Dewan Rakyat and the PR coalition won the popular vote, giving the BN government its worst election showing since independence. In 2015, the PR alliance broke up after a PAS Muktamar (General Assembly) motion unanimously approved the breaking of ties with DAP due to disagreements over PAS's decision to propose a private member's bill to implement "hudud" (Islamic penal code). Following PAS's decision to cut ties with DAP, DAP announced that PR had "ceased to exist".

At the DAP election in December 2012, Vincent Wu, who was initially declared to have secured the sixth spot with 1,202 votes, dropped to 26th place because he had actually secured only 669. Zairil Khir Johari was elected to the central executive committee (CEC) with 803 votes to secure the 20th spot. The glitch, reportedly because of a vote tabulation error due to the copy-and-paste method in Microsoft Excel, had raised suspicion. The DAP admitted to the counting error after discovering the mistake. The DAP election fiasco had caused unease among party members and led to protests to the Registrar of Societies (RoS). Two dissatisfied life members of the DAP then lodged reports with the RoS on the party elections following the revelations. Following the report the RoS had informed DAP of the dispute by its members and in turn as provided for under Section 3A of the Societies Act 1966 did recognise the office-bearers of the committee formed in the party elections on 15 December 2012, the point of contention.

DAP chairperson Karpal Singh said DAP will contest under the PAS logo for the Peninsula and PKR logo in Sabah and Sarawak in the 13th general election, following the Registrar of Societies' (RoS) failure to respond on the withdrawal letter of RoS informing that it does not recognise the party's top leadership line-up. DAP had appealed to the RoS to withdraw its letter to suspend the party's existing central executive committee (CEC) but the department was silent on the matter.

On 19 April 2013, DAP secretary-general Lim Guan Eng informed all its 51 parliament and 103 state candidates to use the rocket symbol first during nomination tomorrow, and show the Election Commission the letter of authorisation signed by secretary-general Lim Guan Eng. If the rocket symbol is rejected, then use the letter of authorisation signed by PAS secretary-general Mustafa Ali for Peninsula Malaysia and PKR letter of authorisation for Sabah and Sarawak. This came after the DAP decided to use PAS and PKR symbols for the coming general election on 5 May. He said the DAP headquarters in Kuala Lumpur received a letter by hand from the RoS at 10 p.m. on 19 April, stating that it had no objections to the DAP using the logo, and that the Election Commission (EC) had informed all returning officers to accept nominations from the DAP.

On 29 September 2013, DAP held a special congress to vote for a new Central Executive Committee.

=== 2015–2019 ===
On 22 September 2015, the Pakatan Harapan coalition was formed by DAP, PKR and the National Trust Party to succeed Pakatan Rakyat. In the 2016 Sarawak state election, the party lost its gains from the previous election, retaining only 7 of the 12 seats it had won in 2011, while Pakatan Harapan as whole won 10 state seats and 30.16% of the popular vote.

On 12 February 2017, Kota Melaka MP, Sim Tong Him, along with three other DAP state assemblymen from Melaka, Goh (Duyong), Lim Jack Wong (Bachang), and Chin Choong Seong (Kesidang), announced their resignation from the party, citing a lack of trust in the party's leadership.

The party participated in the 2018 general election as a part of Pakatan Harapan, now a four-member coalition with the addition of Parti Pribumi Bersatu Malaysia (BERSATU). During the election, the coalition won 113 seats and was able to form the federal government after securing an alliance with the Sabah Heritage Party. The DAP won 42 seats of the 47 seats it contested, making it the second-largest party from Pakatan Harapan in the parliament's lower house behind PKR, which had won 47 seats. The party was given six ministerial portfolios and secured seven deputy minister positions in the Seventh Mahathir cabinet, with then-secretary-general of the party Lim Guan Eng being appointed Minister of Finance, becoming the first person of Malaysian Chinese descent to hold the position in 44 years since Tan Siew Sin from the Malaysian Chinese Association, who served in that capacity from 1959 until 1974. Other ministerial appointments included Anthony Loke as Minister of Transport, who eventually replaced Lim Kit Siang as DAP parliamentary leader on 11 July 2018, Kulasegaran Murugeson as Minister of Human Resources, Yeo Bee Yin as Minister of Energy, Teresa Kok as Minister of Primary Industries, and Gobind Singh Deo as Minister of Communications and Multimedia.

=== Since 2020 ===
In 2020, the party lost its positions in government as a result of the 2020–2022 Malaysian political crisis, which resulted in the dissolution of the Pakatan Harapan government. It also became the largest party in the Dewan Rakyat for the first time, after 11 of the People's Justice Party's 50 MPs resigned. However, over the course of the crisis, a number of state assemblymen defected to opposing coalitions. In Perak, Paul Yong and A Sivasubramaniam left the party to join the new Perikatan Nasional state government. The party expelled Norhizam Hassan Baktee for supporting the new Perikatan Nasional state government in Melaka, and Ronnie Loh for supporting Perikatan's attempt to replace Sabah chief minister Shafie Apdal.

Separately, the party's Sarawak vice-chairman and Padungan assemblyman Wong King Wei resigned, claiming the party had deviated from its objectives and citing his disillusionment with party leadership. He continued to hold his seat as an independent until his term ended in 2021.

In 2022, during that year's party congress, Lim Guan Eng was appointed the party's national chairman after serving the maximum three terms as secretary-general. He was replaced by Anthony Loke, who was elected unanimously by the central executive committee.

The party returned to government following the 2022 Malaysian general election as part of a coalition government under Anwar Ibrahim alongside Barisan Nasional, Gabungan Parti Sarawak, and Gabungan Rakyat Sabah.

In the lead up to the party's 2025 congress, national chairman Lim faced calls to withdraw from the leadership race as a result of grassroots discontent and his clashes with other party leaders. The congress was also characterised in the media as a struggle between opposing factions within the party, traditionalists who preferred to retain the party's "Chinese character" on one side, and moderates open to cooperation with Malay-based parties on the other. Lim was ultimately returned to the party's central executive committee but failed to retain the national chairmanship. He was appointed an advisor to the party while Gobind Singh Deo replaced him as national chairman.

Pressure on the party mounted after it suffered three successive electoral defeats at the state-level in Sabah, Johor, and Negeri Sembilan, which were at least partially attributed to growing discontent among supporters over the federal government's slow pace of reforms and handling of corruption. A conference involving 4,264 delegates was held in 2026 to decide whether the party would remain in the federal government. However, only 2,223 delegates participated in the conference, and only 2,106 voted. A total of 1,806 votes were cast in favour of continued participation. Following the conference, national chairman Gobind called for the finalisation of numerous reforms by the government, including the separation of the roles of attorney-general and public prosecutor, a two-term limit for the prime minister, and amendments to the Security Offences (Special Measures) Act 2012.

== Ethnic diversity ==
DAP was founded by Chen Man Hin and Devan Nair, who were ethnic Chinese and Indian respectively. The majority of DAP's party membership is of ethnic Chinese and Indian heritage, with most elected positions within the party being held by Chinese members. While the party has fielded Malay candidates in every general election since 1969, only five had ever been elected by 2008. Of the five, two had been elected in 1969 as state legislative assemblymen, while the party's first Malay member of parliament was only elected in 1990. The DAP also only gained its first native Sabahan (Kadazandusun) legislator in 2013, Edwin Jack Bosi, who sat in Sabah State Legislative Assembly. The lack of Malay members within the party has led to DAP being viewed as a "racist" or "anti-Malay" party by political opponents in that it is exclusively concerned with the issues of the Chinese or Indian communities.

=== Allegations of racism and chauvinism ===
Despite constant rebuttals by party leaders, DAP has been depicted by their political opponents, especially from UMNO, as a party that favours the Malaysian Chinese minority above others. This allegation of racial chauvinism culminated in a two-piece television program broadcast on government-controlled TV channel Radio Televisyen Malaysia (RTM) entitled "Bahaya Cauvinisme", which translates to "Dangers of Chauvinism". The program forced then party leader Lim Kit Siang to issue a formal media statement to counter the allegations.

On 15 November 2011, Ismail Sabri Yaakob, the Malaysian Minister for Domestic Trade, Co-operatives and Consumerism, accused DAP's publicity chief, Tony Pua of racism for making repeated attacks against the Kedai Rakyat 1Malaysia, a government initiative to supply cheap retail products to Malaysian consumers. Tony Pua was criticised for singling out Kedai Rakyat 1Malaysia, whose suppliers to the store generally come from the Malaysian Bumiputra community, and for not investigating the quality of products supplied by Malaysian-Chinese suppliers or making similar accusations against independent Malaysian-Chinese stores.

Allegations of racism have forced DAP party leader Lim Guan Eng to issue a formal denial in the Penang High Court.

== Party symbols ==
=== Party logo ===
The symbol or logo of the DAP (see above) is the rocket, which it has used since the 1969 general election. Its components are symbolised as follows:

- The red rocket symbolises the Party's aspiration for a modern, dynamic and progressive society
- The four rocket boosters represent the support and drive given to the Party objectives by the three major ethnicities (Malay, Chinese, Indian) and others
- The blue circle stands for the unity of the multi-racial people of Malaysia
- The white background stands for purity and incorruptibility

=== Ubah mascot ===
In 2008, DAP initially introduced "Rocket Kid", a rocket as the party's official mascot during the 12th Malaysian general election. This was then changed to Ubah bird, a hornbill which was designed by Ooi Leng Hang and was launched during the Sarawak state election in 2011 and also used as part of their political campaigning during the 13th Malaysian general election in 2013. DAP had adopted this bird as a symbol for change both for its unique characteristics, hardiness and representation of the unity of both East Malaysia and West Malaysia into a Malaysian nation. Its merchandise such as plush toys, buttons and car stickers were very well received by the public. The idea of the mascot came from Sarawak DAP Secretary and future state party chairman, Chong Chieng Jen, who felt a mascot would boost the spirit of the people. The name "Ubah", which means "change" in Malay, is in line with the party's aspirations in changing the ruling party of the Malaysian federal government. In addition to its original Sarawak Iban costume, "Ubah" now comes in a Malay costume for Hari Raya, Indian costume for Deepavali, Chinese costume for Chinese New Year, Santa Claus costume for Christmas, and a Superman costume that depicts the power of the people. On 13 July 2013, a gigantic float known as the "Ubah Inflatable Bird (Water Ubah)" was officially launched at IJM Promenade, Jelutong, Penang by DAP Secretary General Lim Guan Eng.

=== Anthems ===
DAP's official party anthem is Berjuang Untuk Rakyat Malaysia (Fighting for the Malaysian People).

Other than the official party anthem, DAP has also unveiled several theme songs and music videos mostly with an Ubah theme such as "Ubah" with over 1,000,000 views, 明天 with over 500,000 views and "Ubah Rocket Style" with over 300,000 views, which is a parody of the viral YouTube hit "Gangnam Style".

== Organisational structure ==
=== Central Executive Committee (2025–2028) ===
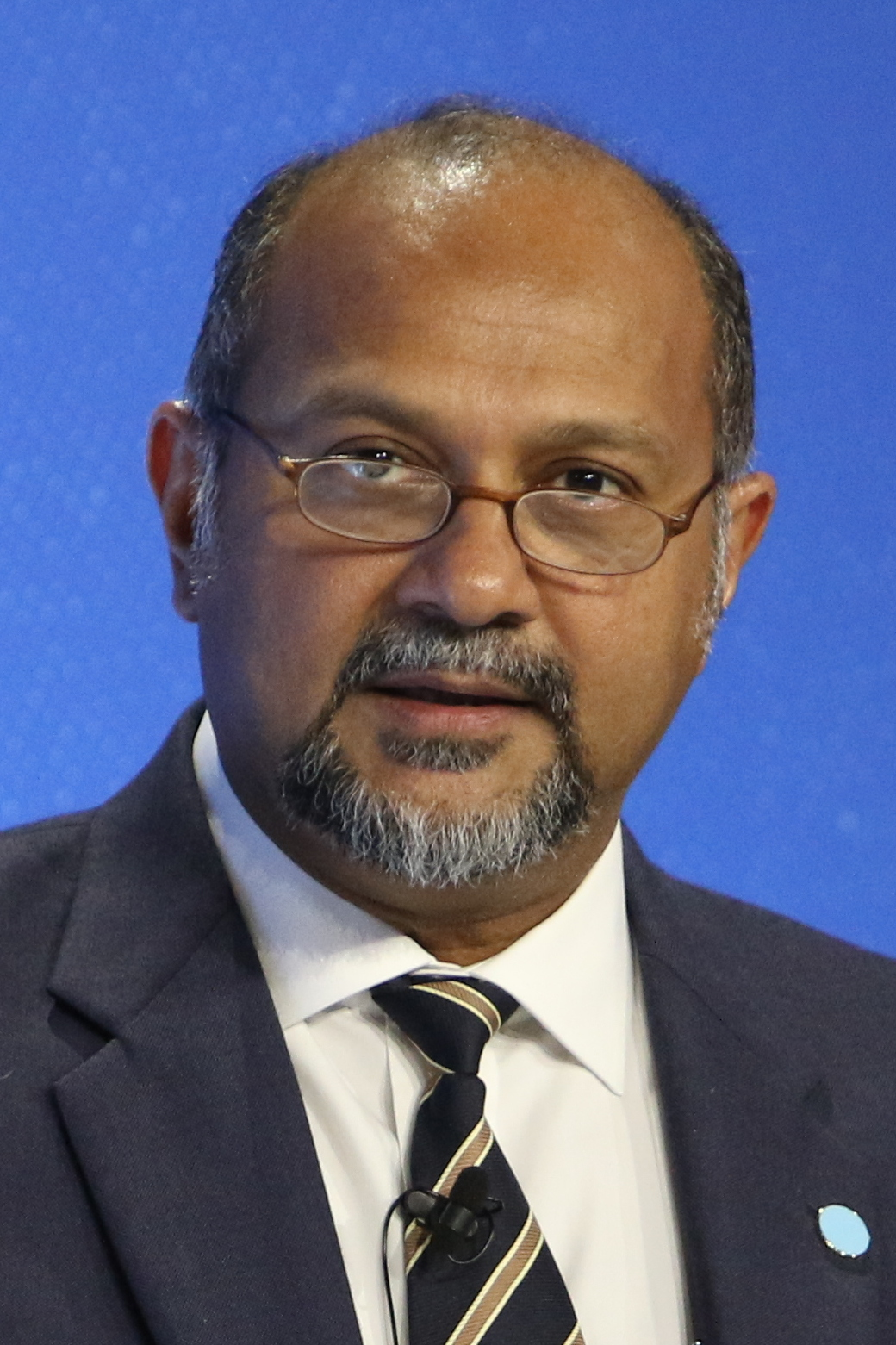
Gobind Singh Deo, current National Chairman

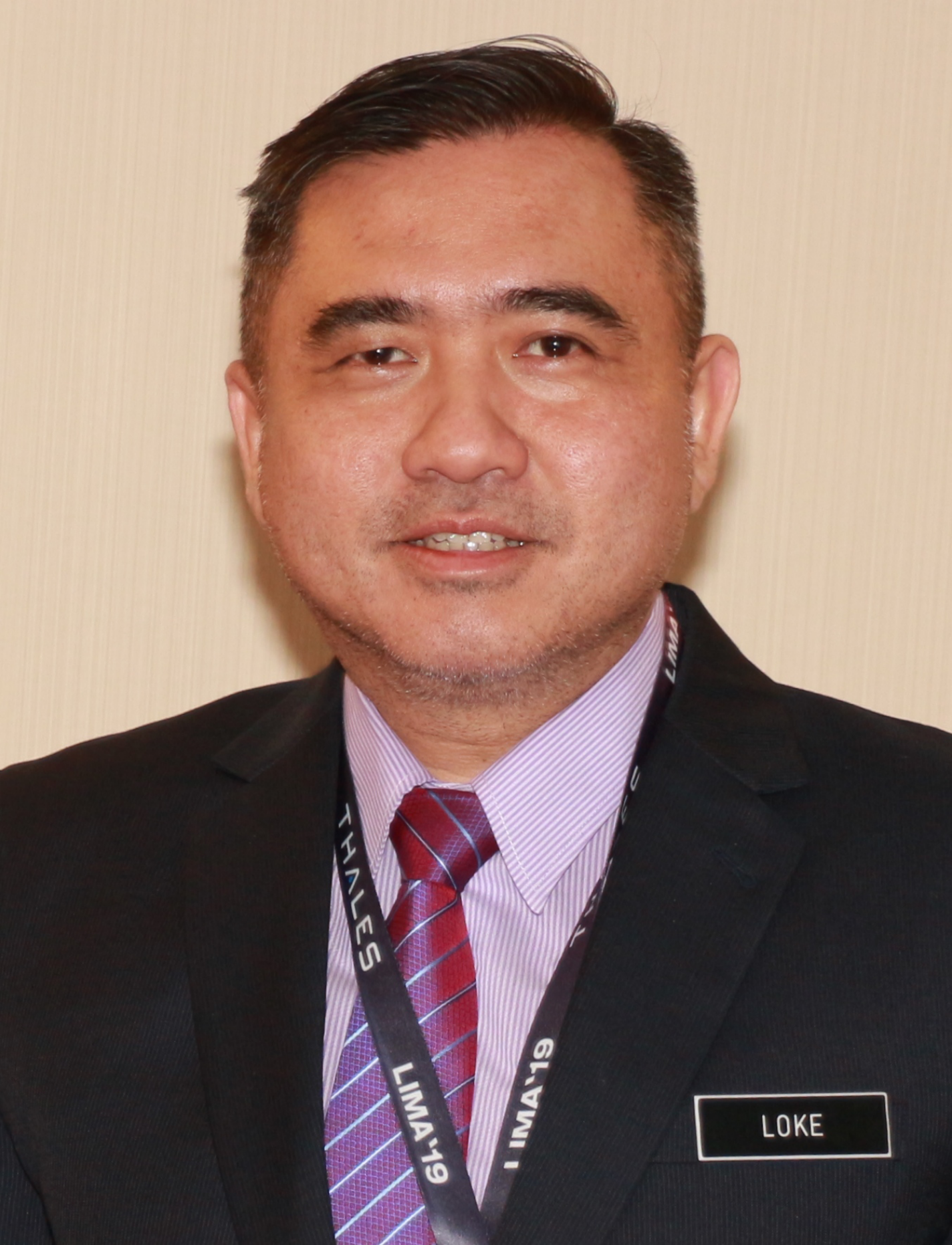
Anthony Loke, current Secretary-General

The Central Executive Committee (CEC) serves as the party's executive body and its 30 members are elected by party delegates during a national congress held every three years. The CEC, in turn, elects the party's national leadership from among its own members, including the Secretary-General, in whom executive power is vested. The current Secretary-General is Minister of Transport Anthony Loke. The latest leadership structure can be found below.

- Advisor:
  - Lim Guan Eng
  - Tan Kok Wai
- National Chairman:
  - Gobind Singh Deo
- National Deputy Chairman:
  - Nga Kor Ming
- National Vice Chairman:
  - Chong Chieng Jen
  - Teo Nie Ching
  - Ng Suee Lim
  - Syahredzan Johan
  - Arul Kumar Jambunathan
- Secretary-General:
  - Anthony Loke Siew Fook
- Deputy Secretary-General:
  - Steven Sim Chee Keong
  - Hannah Yeoh Tseow Suan
  - Ramkarpal Singh
- National Treasurer:
  - Ngeh Koo Ham
- Assistant National Treasurer:
  - Ng Sze Han
- National Organising Secretary:
  - Khoo Poay Tiong
- Assistant National Organising Secretary:
  - Lee Chin Chen
  - Tan Hong Pin
- National Publicity Secretary:
  - Yeo Bee Yin
- Assistant National Publicity Secretary:
  - Young Syefura Othman
  - Wong Shu Qi
- National Political Education Director:
  - Howard Lee Chuan How
- Assistant National Political Education Director:
  - Vivian Wong Shir Yee
- International Secretary:
  - Kasthuriraani Patto
- Assistant International Secretary:
  - Alice Lau Kiong Yieng
- National Strategic Director:
  - Liew Chin Tong
- National Policy Director:
  - Chan Foong Hin
- National Election Director:
  - Wong Kah Woh
- Chairman of the Disciplinary Committee:
  - Tony Pua Kiam Wee
- Head of the Legal Bureau:
  - Ramkarpal Singh
- Committee members (Elected):
  - Teo Kok Seong
  - Chow Kon Yeow
  - Liow Cai Tung
- Committee members (Appointed):
  - Lim Hui Ying
  - Yeoh Soon Hin
  - Thulsi Thivani Manogaran
  - Sivakumar Varatharaju Naidu
  - Papparaidu Veraman
  - Yap Yee Vonne
  - Andrew Chen Kah Eng
  - Kelvin Yii Lee Wuen
  - Vincent Wu Him Ven
  - Sheikh Umar Bagharib Ali
- Parliamentary Leader:
  - Chong Chieng Jen
- Women's Chief:
  - Teo Nie Ching
- Youth Chief:
  - Woo Kah Leong
- State Chairman:
  - Johor: Teo Nie Ching
  - Kedah: Tan Kok Yew
  - Kelantan: Nelson Poan Yin Chai
  - Malacca: Khoo Poay Tiong
  - Negeri Sembilan: Arul Kumar Jambunathan
  - Pahang: Lee Chin Chen
  - Penang: Steven Sim Chee Keong
  - Perak: Nga Kor Ming
  - Perlis: Teh Seng Chuan
  - Sabah: Phoong Jin Zhe
  - Sarawak: Chong Chieng Jen
  - Selangor: Ng Sze Han
  - Terengganu: Cheong Siow Foon
  - Federal Territory of Kuala Lumpur: Tan Kok Wai
  - Federal Territory of Labuan: Han Fook Chiew
- Deputy State Chairman:
  - Johor: Wong Shu Qi
  - Kedah: Mad Gani Ismail
  - Kelantan: Lim Chung Chai
  - Malacca: Saminathan Ganesan
  - Negeri Sembilan: Gunasekaren Palasamy
  - Pahang: Manogaran Marimuthu
  - Penang: Ramkarpal Singh
  - Perak: Sivakumar Varatharaju
  - Perlis: Yeoh Ghin Guan
  - Sabah: Chan Foong Hin
  - Sarawak: Alice Lau Kiong Yieng
  - Selangor: Ganabatirau Veraman
  - Terengganu: Ng Chai Hing
  - Federal Territory of Kuala Lumpur: Fong Kui Lun
  - Federal Territory of Labuan: Jeremy Wong Kwan Kit

== Leadership ==
=== Life Advisor ===
| No. | Portrait | Life Advisor (Lifespan) Office | Term of office & mandate (Duration in years and days) | | |
|---|---|---|---|---|---|
| 1 | | Chen Man Hin (1924–2022); MP for Seremban, 1974–1982 & 1983–1990; MP for Seremban Timor, 1969–1974; MLA for Rahang, 1965–1982 | 3 December 1999 | 17 August 2022 | 13th (1999) |
| 1 | | Chen Man Hin (1924–2022); MP for Seremban, 1974–1982 & 1983–1990; MP for Seremban Timor, 1969–1974; MLA for Rahang, 1965–1982 | 22 years, 257 days | | 14th (2004) |
| 1 | | Chen Man Hin (1924–2022); MP for Seremban, 1974–1982 & 1983–1990; MP for Seremban Timor, 1969–1974; MLA for Rahang, 1965–1982 | 22 years, 257 days | | 15th (2008) |
| 1 | | Chen Man Hin (1924–2022); MP for Seremban, 1974–1982 & 1983–1990; MP for Seremban Timor, 1969–1974; MLA for Rahang, 1965–1982 | 22 years, 257 days | | 16th (2012, 2013, 2017) |
| 1 | | Chen Man Hin (1924–2022); MP for Seremban, 1974–1982 & 1983–1990; MP for Seremban Timor, 1969–1974; MLA for Rahang, 1965–1982 | 22 years, 257 days | | 17th (2022) |

=== Advisor ===
| No. | Portrait | Advisor (Lifespan) Office | Term of office & mandate (Duration in years and days) | | |
|---|---|---|---|---|---|
| 1 | | Tan Kok Wai (born 1957); MP for Sungai Besi, 1986–1995; MP for Cheras, since 1995 | 20 March 2022 | 16 March 2025 | 17th (2022) |
| 1 | | Tan Kok Wai (born 1957); MP for Sungai Besi, 1986–1995; MP for Cheras, since 1995 | 2 years, 361 days | | 17th (2022) |
| 1 | | Tan Kok Wai (born 1957); MP for Sungai Besi, 1986–1995; MP for Cheras, since 1995 | 23 June 2025 | Incumbent | 18th (2025) |
| 1 | | Tan Kok Wai (born 1957); MP for Sungai Besi, 1986–1995; MP for Cheras, since 1995 | 1 year, 149 days | | 18th (2025) |
| 2 | | Lim Guan Eng (born 1960); MP for Kota Melaka, 1986–1999; MP for Bagan, since 2008; MLA for Air Putih, since 2008 | 16 March 2025 | Incumbent | 18th (2025) |
| 2 | | Lim Guan Eng (born 1960); MP for Kota Melaka, 1986–1999; MP for Bagan, since 2008; MLA for Air Putih, since 2008 | 1 year, 248 days | | 18th (2025) |

=== National Chairman ===
| No. | Portrait | National Chairman (Lifespan) Office | Term of office & mandate (Duration in years and days) | | | National Deputy Chairman |
|---|---|---|---|---|---|---|
| 1 | | Chen Man Hin (1924–2022); MP for Seremban, 1974–1982 & 1983–1990; MP for Seremban Timor, 1969–1974; MLA for Rahang, 1965–1982 | 18 March 1966 | 3 December 1999 | 1st (1967) | |
| 1 | | Chen Man Hin (1924–2022); MP for Seremban, 1974–1982 & 1983–1990; MP for Seremban Timor, 1969–1974; MLA for Rahang, 1965–1982 | 33 years, 260 days | | 2nd (1969) | |
| 1 | | Chen Man Hin (1924–2022); MP for Seremban, 1974–1982 & 1983–1990; MP for Seremban Timor, 1969–1974; MLA for Rahang, 1965–1982 | 33 years, 260 days | | 12th (1995) | |
| 2 | | Lim Kit Siang (born 1941); MP for Bandar Melaka, 1969–1974; MP for Kota Melaka, 1974–1978 & 1982–1986; MP for Petaling, 1978–1982; MP for Tanjong, 1986–1999; MP for Ipoh Timor, 2004–2013; MP for Gelang Patah, 2013–2018; MP for Iskandar Puteri, 2018–2022; MLA for Kubu, 1974–1982; MLA for Kampong Kolam, 1986–1990; MLA for Padang Kota, 1990–1995 | 3 December 1999 | 4 September 2004 | 13th (1999) | |
| 2 | | Lim Kit Siang (born 1941); MP for Bandar Melaka, 1969–1974; MP for Kota Melaka, 1974–1978 & 1982–1986; MP for Petaling, 1978–1982; MP for Tanjong, 1986–1999; MP for Ipoh Timor, 2004–2013; MP for Gelang Patah, 2013–2018; MP for Iskandar Puteri, 2018–2022; MLA for Kubu, 1974–1982; MLA for Kampong Kolam, 1986–1990; MLA for Padang Kota, 1990–1995 | 4 years, 276 days | | 13th (1999) | |
| 3 | | Karpal Singh (1940–2014); MP for Jelutong, 1978–1999; MP for Bukit Gelugor, 2004–2014 | 4 September 2004 | 29 March 2014 | 14th (2004) | Tan Kok Wai (–2014) |
| 3 | | Karpal Singh (1940–2014); MP for Jelutong, 1978–1999; MP for Bukit Gelugor, 2004–2014 | 9 years, 206 days | | 15th (2008) 16th (2012, 2013) | Tan Kok Wai (–2014) |
| 4 | | Tan Kok Wai (born 1957); MP for Sungai Besi, 1986–1995; MP for Cheras, since 1995 | 29 March 2014 | 20 March 2022 | – 16th (2017) | Gobind Singh Deo (since 2017) |
| 4 | | Tan Kok Wai (born 1957); MP for Sungai Besi, 1986–1995; MP for Cheras, since 1995 | 7 years, 356 days | | – 16th (2017) | Gobind Singh Deo (since 2017) |
| 5 | | Lim Guan Eng (born 1960); MP for Kota Melaka, 1986–1999; MP for Bagan, since 2008; MLA for Air Putih, since 2008 | 20 March 2022 | 16 March 2025 | 17th (2022) | Gobind Singh Deo (since 2017) |
| 5 | | Lim Guan Eng (born 1960); MP for Kota Melaka, 1986–1999; MP for Bagan, since 2008; MLA for Air Putih, since 2008 | 2 years, 361 days | | 17th (2022) | Gobind Singh Deo (since 2017) |
| 6 | | Gobind Singh Deo (born 1973); MP for Puchong, 2008–2022; MP for Damansara, since 2022 | 16 March 2025 | Incumbent | 18th (2025) | Nga Kor Ming (since 2025) |
| 6 | | Gobind Singh Deo (born 1973); MP for Puchong, 2008–2022; MP for Damansara, since 2022 | 1 year, 248 days | | 18th (2025) | Nga Kor Ming (since 2025) |

=== Secretary-General ===
| No. | Portrait | Secretary-General (Lifespan) Office | Term of office & mandate (Duration in years and days) | | | Deputy Secretary-General |
|---|---|---|---|---|---|---|
| 1 | | Devan Nair (1923–2005); MP for Bangsar, 1964–1969 | 18 March 1966 | 30 July 1967 | – | D. P. Xavier |
| 1 | | Devan Nair (1923–2005); MP for Bangsar, 1964–1969 | 1 year, 134 days | | – | D. P. Xavier |
| 2 | | Goh Hock Guan (1935–2018); MP for Bangsar, 1969–1974 | 30 July 1967 | 1 October 1969 | 1st (1967) | |
| 2 | | Goh Hock Guan (1935–2018); MP for Bangsar, 1969–1974 | 2 years, 63 days | | 1st (1967) | |
| 3 | | Lim Kit Siang (born 1941); MP for Bandar Melaka, 1969–1974; MP for Kota Melaka, 1974–1978 & 1982–1986; MP for Petaling, 1978–1982; MP for Tanjong, 1986–1999; MP for Ipoh Timor, 2004–2013; MP for Gelang Patah, 2013–2018; MP for Iskandar Puteri, 2018–2022; MLA for Kubu, 1974–1982; MLA for Kampong Kolam, 1986–1990; MLA for Padang Kota, 1990–1995 | 1 October 1970 | 3 December 1999 | 2nd (1969) | Lim Guan Eng (1995–2004) |
| 3 | | Lim Kit Siang (born 1941); MP for Bandar Melaka, 1969–1974; MP for Kota Melaka, 1974–1978 & 1982–1986; MP for Petaling, 1978–1982; MP for Tanjong, 1986–1999; MP for Ipoh Timor, 2004–2013; MP for Gelang Patah, 2013–2018; MP for Iskandar Puteri, 2018–2022; MLA for Kubu, 1974–1982; MLA for Kampong Kolam, 1986–1990; MLA for Padang Kota, 1990–1995 | 29 years, 63 days | | 12th (1995) | Lim Guan Eng (1995–2004) |
| 4 | | Kerk Kim Hock (1956–2017); MP for Pasir Pinji, 1990–1999; MP for Kota Melaka, 1999–2004; MLA for Durian Daun, 1986–1990 | 3 December 1999 | 5 May 2002 | 13th (1999) | Lim Guan Eng (1995–2004) |
| 4 | | Kerk Kim Hock (1956–2017); MP for Pasir Pinji, 1990–1999; MP for Kota Melaka, 1999–2004; MLA for Durian Daun, 1986–1990 | 2 years, 153 days | | 13th (1999) | Lim Guan Eng (1995–2004) |
| 4 | | Kerk Kim Hock (1956–2017); MP for Pasir Pinji, 1990–1999; MP for Kota Melaka, 1999–2004; MLA for Durian Daun, 1986–1990 | 22 September 2002 | 28 March 2004 | 13th (1999) | Lim Guan Eng (1995–2004) |
| 4 | | Kerk Kim Hock (1956–2017); MP for Pasir Pinji, 1990–1999; MP for Kota Melaka, 1999–2004; MLA for Durian Daun, 1986–1990 | 1 year, 188 days | | 13th (1999) | Lim Guan Eng (1995–2004) |
| 5 | | Lim Guan Eng (born 1960); MP for Kota Melaka, 1986–1999; MP for Bagan, since 2008; MLA for Air Putih, since 2008 | 4 September 2004 | 20 March 2022 | 14th (2004) | Chong Eng (–2017) |
| 5 | | Lim Guan Eng (born 1960); MP for Kota Melaka, 1986–1999; MP for Bagan, since 2008; MLA for Air Putih, since 2008 | 4 September 2004 | 20 March 2022 | 14th (2004) | Ramasamy Palanisamy (–2017) |
| 5 | | Lim Guan Eng (born 1960); MP for Kota Melaka, 1986–1999; MP for Bagan, since 2008; MLA for Air Putih, since 2008 | 4 September 2004 | 20 March 2022 | 14th (2004) | Ngeh Koo Ham (–2017) |
| 5 | | Lim Guan Eng (born 1960); MP for Kota Melaka, 1986–1999; MP for Bagan, since 2008; MLA for Air Putih, since 2008 | 4 September 2004 | 20 March 2022 | 14th (2004) | Nga Kor Ming (2017–2022) |
| 5 | | Lim Guan Eng (born 1960); MP for Kota Melaka, 1986–1999; MP for Bagan, since 2008; MLA for Air Putih, since 2008 | 4 September 2004 | 20 March 2022 | 15th (2008) | Nga Kor Ming (2017–2022) |
| 5 | | Lim Guan Eng (born 1960); MP for Kota Melaka, 1986–1999; MP for Bagan, since 2008; MLA for Air Putih, since 2008 | 4 September 2004 | 20 March 2022 | 16th (2012, 2013 & 2017) | Teresa Kok Suh Sim (2017–2022) |
| 5 | | Lim Guan Eng (born 1960); MP for Kota Melaka, 1986–1999; MP for Bagan, since 2008; MLA for Air Putih, since 2008 | 17 years, 197 days | | 16th (2012, 2013 & 2017) | V. Sivakumar (2017–2025) |
| 6 | | Anthony Loke Siew Fook (born 1977); MP for Rasah, 2008–2013; MP for Seremban, since 2013; MLA for Lobak, 2004–2013; MLA for Chennah, 2013-2026 | 20 March 2022 | Incumbent | 17th (2022) 18th (2025) | V. Sivakumar (2017–2025) |
| 6 | | Anthony Loke Siew Fook (born 1977); MP for Rasah, 2008–2013; MP for Seremban, since 2013; MLA for Lobak, 2004–2013; MLA for Chennah, 2013-2026 | 4 years, 244 days | | 17th (2022) 18th (2025) | Tengku Zulpuri Shah Raja Puji (2022–2025) |
| 6 | | Anthony Loke Siew Fook (born 1977); MP for Rasah, 2008–2013; MP for Seremban, since 2013; MLA for Lobak, 2004–2013; MLA for Chennah, 2013-2026 | 4 years, 244 days | | 17th (2022) 18th (2025) | Liew Chin Tong (2022–2025) |
| 6 | | Anthony Loke Siew Fook (born 1977); MP for Rasah, 2008–2013; MP for Seremban, since 2013; MLA for Lobak, 2004–2013; MLA for Chennah, 2013-2026 | 4 years, 244 days | | 17th (2022) 18th (2025) | Steven Sim Chee Keong (since 2025) |
| 6 | | Anthony Loke Siew Fook (born 1977); MP for Rasah, 2008–2013; MP for Seremban, since 2013; MLA for Lobak, 2004–2013; MLA for Chennah, 2013-2026 | 4 years, 244 days | | 17th (2022) 18th (2025) | Hannah Yeoh Tseow Suan (since 2025) |
| 6 | | Anthony Loke Siew Fook (born 1977); MP for Rasah, 2008–2013; MP for Seremban, since 2013; MLA for Lobak, 2004–2013; MLA for Chennah, 2013-2026 | 4 years, 244 days | | 17th (2022) 18th (2025) | Ramkarpal Singh (since 2025) |

==== Acting Secretary-General ====
| No. | Portrait | Acting Secretary-General (Lifespan) Office | Term of office & mandate (Duration in years and days) | | | Deputy Secretary-General |
|---|---|---|---|---|---|---|
| 1 | | Fan Yew Teng (1942–2010); MP for Kampar, 1969–1974; MP for Menglembu, 1974–1978; MLA for Petaling Jaya, 1974–1978 | 1 October 1969 | 1 October 1970 | – 2nd (1969) | |
| 1 | | Fan Yew Teng (1942–2010); MP for Kampar, 1969–1974; MP for Menglembu, 1974–1978; MLA for Petaling Jaya, 1974–1978 | 1 year, 0 days | | – 2nd (1969) | |
| 2 | | Chong Eng (born 1957); MP for Bukit Mertajam, 1999–2013; MLA for Batu Lancang, 1995–1999; MLA for Padang Lalang, 2013–2023 | 5 May 2002 | 22 September 2002 | – 13th (1999) | |
| 2 | | Chong Eng (born 1957); MP for Bukit Mertajam, 1999–2013; MLA for Batu Lancang, 1995–1999; MLA for Padang Lalang, 2013–2023 | 140 days | | – 13th (1999) | |
| 3 | | M. Kulasegaran (born 1957); MP for Teluk Intan, 1997–1999; MP for Ipoh Barat, since 2004 | 28 March 2004 | 4 September 2004 | – 13th (1999) | |
| 3 | | M. Kulasegaran (born 1957); MP for Teluk Intan, 1997–1999; MP for Ipoh Barat, since 2004 | 184 days | | – 13th (1999) | |

Note: The Acting Secretary-General is appointed when the Secretary-General is incapable of carrying out their duties or if the position is vacated before an election can be held.. Lim Kit Siang was elected as Secretary-General in October 1969 while detained under the ISA and Fan Yew Teng was Acting Secretary-General. Chong Eng took over for Kerk Kim Hock while the latter sought treatment for rectal cancer. M. Kulasegaran was Acting Secretary-General after Kerk Kim Hock lost his seat in parliament and resigned before Lim Guan Eng was elected Secretary-General.

=== Chairman of the Central Policy and Strategic Planning Commission ===
| No. | Portrait | Chairman of Central Policy and Strategic Planning Commission (Lifespan) Office | Term of office & mandate (Duration in years and days) | | |
|---|---|---|---|---|---|
| 1 | | Lim Kit Siang (born 1941); MP for Bandar Melaka, 1969–1974; MP for Kota Melaka, 1974–1978 & 1982–1986; MP for Petaling, 1978–1982; MP for Tanjong, 1986–1999; MP for Ipoh Timor, 2004–2013; MP for Gelang Patah, 2013–2018; MP for Iskandar Puteri, 2018–2022; MLA for Kubu, 1974–1982; MLA for Kampong Kolam, 1986–1990; MLA for Padang Kota, 1990–1995 | 4 September 2004 | Incumbent | 14th (2004) |
| 1 | | Lim Kit Siang (born 1941); MP for Bandar Melaka, 1969–1974; MP for Kota Melaka, 1974–1978 & 1982–1986; MP for Petaling, 1978–1982; MP for Tanjong, 1986–1999; MP for Ipoh Timor, 2004–2013; MP for Gelang Patah, 2013–2018; MP for Iskandar Puteri, 2018–2022; MLA for Kubu, 1974–1982; MLA for Kampong Kolam, 1986–1990; MLA for Padang Kota, 1990–1995 | 22 years, 76 days | | 15th (2008) |
| 1 | | Lim Kit Siang (born 1941); MP for Bandar Melaka, 1969–1974; MP for Kota Melaka, 1974–1978 & 1982–1986; MP for Petaling, 1978–1982; MP for Tanjong, 1986–1999; MP for Ipoh Timor, 2004–2013; MP for Gelang Patah, 2013–2018; MP for Iskandar Puteri, 2018–2022; MLA for Kubu, 1974–1982; MLA for Kampong Kolam, 1986–1990; MLA for Padang Kota, 1990–1995 | 22 years, 76 days | | 16th (2012, 2013, 2017) |
| 1 | | Lim Kit Siang (born 1941); MP for Bandar Melaka, 1969–1974; MP for Kota Melaka, 1974–1978 & 1982–1986; MP for Petaling, 1978–1982; MP for Tanjong, 1986–1999; MP for Ipoh Timor, 2004–2013; MP for Gelang Patah, 2013–2018; MP for Iskandar Puteri, 2018–2022; MLA for Kubu, 1974–1982; MLA for Kampong Kolam, 1986–1990; MLA for Padang Kota, 1990–1995 | 22 years, 76 days | | 17th (2022) |

Note: Chairman of the Central Policy and Strategic Planning Commission is a newly created position on 2004 when Lim Kit Siang refused to be re-elected as Chairman of DAP.

=== Parliamentary Leader ===
| No. | Portrait | Parliamentary Leader (Lifespan) Office | Term of office & mandate (Duration in years and days) | | |
|---|---|---|---|---|---|
| 1 | | Lim Kit Siang (born 1941); MP for Bandar Melaka, 1969–1974; MP for Kota Melaka, 1974–1978 & 1982–1986; MP for Petaling, 1978–1982; MP for Tanjong, 1986–1999; MP for Ipoh Timor, 2004–2013; MP for Gelang Patah, 2013–2018; MP for Iskandar Puteri, 2018–2022; MLA for Kubu, 1974–1982; MLA for Kampong Kolam, 1986–1990; MLA for Padang Kota, 1990–1995 | 5 March 2008 | 11 July 2018 | 15th (2008) 16th (2012, 2013, 2017) |
| 1 | | Lim Kit Siang (born 1941); MP for Bandar Melaka, 1969–1974; MP for Kota Melaka, 1974–1978 & 1982–1986; MP for Petaling, 1978–1982; MP for Tanjong, 1986–1999; MP for Ipoh Timor, 2004–2013; MP for Gelang Patah, 2013–2018; MP for Iskandar Puteri, 2018–2022; MLA for Kubu, 1974–1982; MLA for Kampong Kolam, 1986–1990; MLA for Padang Kota, 1990–1995 | 10 years, 128 days | | 15th (2008) 16th (2012, 2013, 2017) |
| 2 | | Anthony Loke Siew Fook (born 1977); MP for Rasah, 2008–2013; MP for Seremban, since 2013; MLA for Lobak, 2004–2013; MLA for Chennah, since 2013 | 11 July 2018 | 20 March 2022 | – 16th (2012, 2013, 2017) |
| 2 | | Anthony Loke Siew Fook (born 1977); MP for Rasah, 2008–2013; MP for Seremban, since 2013; MLA for Lobak, 2004–2013; MLA for Chennah, since 2013 | 3 years, 252 days | | – 16th (2012, 2013, 2017) |
| 3 | | Nga Kor Ming (born 1972); MP for Taiping, 2008–2018; MP for Teluk Intan, since 2018; MLA for Pantai Remis, 1999–2013; MLA for Kepayang, 2013–2018, since 2022; MLA for Aulong, 2018–2022 | 20 March 2022 | 23 June 2025 | 17th (2022) 18th (2025) |
| 3 | | Nga Kor Ming (born 1972); MP for Taiping, 2008–2018; MP for Teluk Intan, since 2018; MLA for Pantai Remis, 1999–2013; MLA for Kepayang, 2013–2018, since 2022; MLA for Aulong, 2018–2022 | 3 years, 95 days | | 17th (2022) 18th (2025) |
| 4 | | Chong Chieng Jen (born 1971); MP for Bandar Kuching, 2004–2018; MP for Stampin, since 2021; MLA for Kota Sentosa, 2006–2021; MLA for Padungan, since 2021 | 23 June 2025 | Incumbent | – 18th (2025) |
| 4 | | Chong Chieng Jen (born 1971); MP for Bandar Kuching, 2004–2018; MP for Stampin, since 2021; MLA for Kota Sentosa, 2006–2021; MLA for Padungan, since 2021 | 1 year, 149 days | | – 18th (2025) |

== Elected representatives ==
=== Dewan Negara (Senate) ===
==== Senators ====
- His Majesty's appointee:
  - Leong Ngah Ngah
  - Sheikh Umar Bagharib Ali
  - Phoong Jin Zhe
  - Larry Asap
  - Thiagarajah Rajagopal
- Negeri Sembilan State Legislative Assembly:
  - Vincent Wu Him Ven
- Penang State Legislative Assembly:
  - Lingeshwaran Arunasalam
- Selangor State Legislative Assembly:
  - Tiew Way Keng

=== Dewan Rakyat (House of Representatives) ===
==== Members of Parliament of the 15th Malaysian Parliament ====
DAP has 40 members in the House of Representatives.

| State | No. | Parliament Constituency | Member | Party |
|---|---|---|---|---|
| Penang | P043 | Bagan | Lim Guan Eng | DAP |
| Penang | P045 | Bukit Mertajam | Steven Sim Chee Keong | DAP |
| Penang | P046 | Batu Kawan | Chow Kon Yeow | DAP |
| Penang | P048 | Bukit Bendera | Syerleena Abdul Rashid | DAP |
| Penang | P049 | Tanjong | Lim Hui Ying | DAP |
| Penang | P050 | Jelutong | Sanisvara Nethaji Rayer Rajaji Rayer | DAP |
| Penang | P051 | Bukit Gelugor | Ramkarpal Singh | DAP |
| Perak | P060 | Taiping | Wong Kah Woh | DAP |
| Perak | P064 | Ipoh Timor | Howard Lee Chuan How | DAP |
| Perak | P065 | Ipoh Barat | Kulasegaran Murugeson | DAP |
| Perak | P066 | Batu Gajah | Sivakumar Varatharaju Naidu | DAP |
| Perak | P068 | Beruas | Ngeh Koo Ham | DAP |
| Perak | P070 | Kampar | Chong Zhemin | DAP |
| Perak | P076 | Teluk Intan | Nga Kor Ming | DAP |
| Pahang | P080 | Raub | Chow Yu Hui | DAP |
| Pahang | P089 | Bentong | Young Syefura Othman | DAP |
| Selangor | P102 | Bangi | Syahredzan Johan | DAP |
| Selangor | P103 | Puchong | Yeo Bee Yin | DAP |
| Selangor | P106 | Damansara | Gobind Singh Deo | DAP |
| Selangor | P110 | Klang | Ganabatirau Veraman | DAP |
| Kuala Lumpur | P114 | Kepong | Lim Lip Eng | DAP |
| Kuala Lumpur | P117 | Segambut | Hannah Yeoh Tseow Suan | DAP |
| Kuala Lumpur | P120 | Bukit Bintang | Fong Kui Lun | DAP |
| Kuala Lumpur | P122 | Seputeh | Teresa Kok Suh Sim | DAP |
| Kuala Lumpur | P123 | Cheras | Tan Kok Wai | DAP |
| Negeri Sembilan | P128 | Seremban | Anthony Loke Siew Fook | DAP |
| Negeri Sembilan | P130 | Rasah | Cha Kee Chin | DAP |
| Malacca | P138 | Kota Melaka | Khoo Poay Tiong | DAP |
| Johor | P142 | Labis | Pang Hok Liong | DAP |
| Johor | P145 | Bakri | Tan Hong Pin | DAP |
| Johor | P152 | Kluang | Wong Shu Qi | DAP |
| Johor | P162 | Iskandar Puteri | Liew Chin Tong | DAP |
| Johor | P163 | Kulai | Teo Nie Ching | DAP |
| Sabah | P172 | Kota Kinabalu | Chan Foong Hin | DAP |
| Sabah | P186 | Sandakan | Vivian Wong Shir Yee | DAP |
| Sarawak | P192 | Mas Gading | Mordi Bimol | DAP |
| Sarawak | P195 | Bandar Kuching | Kelvin Yii Lee Wuen | DAP |
| Sarawak | P196 | Stampin | Chong Chieng Jen | DAP |
| Sarawak | P211 | Lanang | Alice Lau Kiong Yieng | DAP |
| Sarawak | P212 | Sibu | Oscar Ling Chai Yew | DAP |
| Total | Penang (7), Perak (7), Pahang (2), Selangor (4), F.T. Kuala Lumpur (5), Negeri Sembilan (2), Malacca (1), Johor (5), Sabah (2), Sarawak (5) | | | |

=== Dewan Undangan Negeri (State Legislative Assembly) ===
==== Malaysian State Assembly Representatives ====
Penang State Legislative Assembly
19 / 40
Negeri Sembilan State Legislative Assembly
9 / 36
Perak State Legislative Assembly
18 / 59
Selangor State Legislative Assembly
15 / 56
Malacca State Legislative Assembly
4 / 28
Pahang State Legislative Assembly
6 / 47
Johor State Legislative Assembly
6 / 56
Sarawak State Legislative Assembly
2 / 82
Kedah State Legislative Assembly
1 / 36
Kelantan State Legislative Assembly
0 / 45
Perlis State Legislative Assembly
0 / 15
Sabah State Legislative Assembly
0 / 79
Terengganu State Legislative Assembly
0 / 33

| State | No. | Parliament Constituency | No. | State Constituency | Member | Party |
|---|---|---|---|---|---|---|
| Kedah | P009 | Alor Setar | N13 | Kota Darul Aman | Teh Swee Leong | DAP |
| Penang | P043 | Bagan | N07 | Sungai Puyu | Phee Syn Tze | DAP |
| Penang | P043 | Bagan | N08 | Bagan Jermal | Chee Yeeh Keen | DAP |
| Penang | P043 | Bagan | N09 | Bagan Dalam | Kumaran Krishnan | DAP |
| Penang | P045 | Bukit Mertajam | N13 | Berapit | Heng Lee Lee | DAP |
| Penang | P045 | Bukit Mertajam | N15 | Padang Lalang | Daniel Gooi Zi Sen | DAP |
| Penang | P046 | Batu Kawan | N16 | Perai | Sundarajoo Somu | DAP |
| Penang | P047 | Nibong Tebal | N19 | Jawi | Jason H'ng Mooi Lye | DAP |
| Penang | P048 | Bukit Bendera | N22 | Tanjong Bunga | Zairil Khir Johari | DAP |
| Penang | P048 | Bukit Bendera | N23 | Air Putih | Lim Guan Eng | DAP |
| Penang | P048 | Bukit Bendera | N25 | Pulau Tikus | Joshua Woo Sze Zeng | DAP |
| Penang | P049 | Tanjong | N26 | Padang Kota | Chow Kon Yeow | DAP |
| Penang | P049 | Tanjong | N27 | Pengkalan Kota | Wong Yuee Harng | DAP |
| Penang | P049 | Tanjong | N28 | Komtar | Teh Lai Heng | DAP |
| Penang | P050 | Jelutong | N29 | Datok Keramat | Jagdeep Singh Deo | DAP |
| Penang | P050 | Jelutong | N30 | Sungai Pinang | Lim Siew Khim | DAP |
| Penang | P050 | Jelutong | N31 | Batu Lancang | Ong Ah Teong | DAP |
| Penang | P051 | Bukit Gelugor | N32 | Seri Delima | Connie Tan Hooi Peng | DAP |
| Penang | P051 | Bukit Gelugor | N33 | Air Itam | Joseph Ng Soon Siang | DAP |
| Penang | P051 | Bukit Gelugor | N34 | Paya Terubong | Wong Hon Wai | DAP |
| Perak | P060 | Taiping | N17 | Pokok Assam | Ong Seng Guan | DAP |
| Perak | P060 | Taiping | N18 | Aulong | Teh Kok Lim | DAP |
| Perak | P062 | Sungai Siput | N22 | Jalong | Loh Sze Yee | DAP |
| Perak | P064 | Ipoh Timor | N25 | Canning | Jenny Choy Tsi Jen | DAP |
| Perak | P064 | Ipoh Timor | N26 | Tebing Tinggi | Abdul Aziz Bari | DAP |
| Perak | P064 | Ipoh Timor | N27 | Pasir Pinji | Goh See Hua | DAP |
| Perak | P065 | Ipoh Barat | N28 | Bercham | Ong Boon Piow | DAP |
| Perak | P065 | Ipoh Barat | N29 | Kepayang | Nga Kor Ming | DAP |
| Perak | P065 | Ipoh Barat | N30 | Buntong | Thulsi Thivani Manogaran | DAP |
| Perak | P066 | Batu Gajah | N31 | Jelapang | Cheah Pou Hian | DAP |
| Perak | P066 | Batu Gajah | N32 | Menglembu | Steven Chaw Kam Foon | DAP |
| Perak | P066 | Batu Gajah | N33 | Tronoh | Steven Tiw Tee Siang | DAP |
| Perak | P068 | Beruas | N37 | Pantai Remis | Wong May Ing | DAP |
| Perak | P068 | Beruas | N38 | Astaka | Jason Ng Thien Yeong | DAP |
| Perak | P070 | Kampar | N41 | Malim Nawar | Bavani Veraiah | DAP |
| Perak | P070 | Kampar | N42 | Keranji | Angeline Koo Haai Yen | DAP |
| Perak | P076 | Teluk Intan | N55 | Pasir Bedamar | Woo Kah Leong | DAP |
| Perak | P077 | Tanjong Malim | N57 | Sungkai | Sivanesan Achalingam | DAP |
| Pahang | P078 | Cameron Highlands | N01 | Tanah Rata | Ho Chi Yang | DAP |
| Pahang | P080 | Raub | N07 | Tras | Tengku Zulpuri Shah Raja Puji | DAP |
| Pahang | P088 | Temerloh | N30 | Mentakab | Woo Chee Wan | DAP |
| Pahang | P089 | Bentong | N33 | Bilut | Lee Chin Chen | DAP |
| Pahang | P089 | Bentong | N34 | Ketari | Thomas Su Keong Siong | DAP |
| Pahang | P090 | Bera | N36 | Triang | Leong Yu Man | DAP |
| Selangor | P093 | Sungai Besar | N04 | Sekinchan | Ng Suee Lim | DAP |
| Selangor | P094 | Hulu Selangor | N06 | Kuala Kubu Baharu | Pang Sock Tao | DAP |
| Selangor | P100 | Pandan | N22 | Teratai | Yew Jia Haur | DAP |
| Selangor | P102 | Bangi | N27 | Balakong | Wayne Ong Chun Wei | DAP |
| Selangor | P103 | Puchong | N28 | Seri Kembangan | Wong Siew Ki | DAP |
| Selangor | P104 | Subang | N30 | Kinrara | Ng Sze Han | DAP |
| Selangor | P104 | Subang | N31 | Subang Jaya | Michelle Ng Mei Sze | DAP |
| Selangor | P105 | Petaling Jaya | N34 | Bukit Gasing | Rajiv Rishyakaran | DAP |
| Selangor | P106 | Damansara | N35 | Kampung Tunku | Lim Yi Wei | DAP |
| Selangor | P106 | Damansara | N36 | Bandar Utama | Jamaliah Jamaluddin | DAP |
| Selangor | P110 | Klang | N45 | Bandar Baru Klang | Quah Perng Fei | DAP |
| Selangor | P110 | Klang | N47 | Pandamaran | Tony Leong Tuck Chee | DAP |
| Selangor | P111 | Kota Raja | N50 | Kota Kemuning | Preakas Sampunathan | DAP |
| Selangor | P112 | Kuala Langat | N52 | Banting | Papparaidu Veraman | DAP |
| Selangor | P113 | Sepang | N56 | Sungai Pelek | Lwi Kian Keong | DAP |
| Negeri Sembilan | P127 | Jempol | N08 | Bahau | Teo Kok Seong | DAP |
| Negeri Sembilan | P128 | Seremban | N10 | Nilai | Arul Kumar Jambunathan | DAP |
| Negeri Sembilan | P128 | Seremban | N11 | Lobak | Chew Seh Yong | DAP |
| Negeri Sembilan | P128 | Seremban | N12 | Temiang | Ho Weng Wah | DAP |
| Negeri Sembilan | P130 | Rasah | N21 | Bukit Kepayang | Nicole Tan Lee Koon | DAP |
| Negeri Sembilan | P130 | Rasah | N22 | Rahang | Siau Meow Kong | DAP |
| Negeri Sembilan | P130 | Rasah | N23 | Mambau | Lee Kai Yet | DAP |
| Negeri Sembilan | P130 | Rasah | N24 | Seremban Jaya | Mugunthan Subramanian | DAP |
| Negeri Sembilan | P132 | Port Dickson | N30 | Lukut | Choo Ken Hwa | DAP |
| Malacca | P137 | Hang Tuah Jaya | N16 | Ayer Keroh | Kerk Chee Yee | DAP |
| Malacca | P138 | Kota Melaka | N19 | Kesidang | Allex Seah Shoo Chin | DAP |
| Malacca | P138 | Kota Melaka | N20 | Kota Laksamana | Low Chee Leong | DAP |
| Malacca | P138 | Kota Melaka | N22 | Bandar Hilir | Leng Chau Yen | DAP |
| Johor | P145 | Bakri | N12 | Bentayan | Ng Yak Howe | DAP |
| Johor | P150 | Batu Pahat | N23 | Penggaram | Felicia Poh Rui Ling | DAP |
| Johor | P152 | Kluang | N28 | Mengkibol | Chu Poh Yee | DAP |
| Johor | P160 | Johor Bahru | N45 | Stulang | Andrew Chen Kah Eng | DAP |
| Johor | P162 | Iskandar Puteri | N48 | Skudai | Kartiyaini Jeyapalan | DAP |
| Johor | P163 | Kulai | N52 | Senai | Wong Bor Yang | DAP |
| Sarawak | P195 | Bandar Kuching | N09 | Padungan | Chong Chieng Jen | DAP |
| Sarawak | P195 | Bandar Kuching | N10 | Pending | Violet Yong Wui Wui | DAP |
| Total | Kedah (1), Penang (19), Perak (18), Pahang (6), Selangor (15), Negeri Sembilan (11), Malacca (4), Johor (6), Sarawak (2) | | | | | |

== Government offices ==
=== Federal government ===
| Portfolio | Office Bearer | Constituency |
|---|---|---|
| Minister of Transport | Loke Siew Fook | Seremban |
| Minister of Housing and Local Government | Nga Kor Ming | Teluk Intan |
| Minister in the Prime Minister's Department (Federal Territories) | Hannah Yeoh Tseow Suan | Segambut |
| Minister of Digital | Gobind Singh Deo | Damansara |
| Minister of Entrepreneur and Cooperative Development | Steven Sim Chee Keong | Bukit Mertajam |

| Portfolio | Office Bearer | Constituency |
|---|---|---|
| Deputy Minister of Women, Family and Community Development | Lim Hui Ying | Tanjong |
| Deputy Minister of Finance | Liew Chin Tong | Iskandar Puteri |
| Deputy Minister in the Prime Minister's Department (Law and Institutional Reform) | Kulasegaran Murugeson | Ipoh Barat |
| Deputy Minister of Communications | Teo Nie Ching | Kulai |
| Deputy Minister of Education | Wong Kah Woh | Taiping |
| Deputy Minister of Agriculture and Food Security | Datuk Chan Foong Hin | Kota Kinabalu |
| Deputy Minister of Youth and Sports | Mordi Bimol | Mas Gading |

=== State governments ===
DAP currently leads the government of Penang and served as junior partner in several states governed by Pakatan Harapan and Barisan Nasional

- Penang (2008–present)
- Selangor (2008–present)
- Negeri Sembilan (2018–2026)
- Pahang (2022–present)
- Perak (2008–2009, 2018–2020, 2022–present)
- Malacca (2018–2020, 2022–2026)
- Sabah (2018–2020, 2022–2025)
- Johor (2018–2020)
- Kedah (2008–2013, 2018–2020)
- Singapore (1963–1965 (Note: as PAP))

Note: bold as Menteri Besar/Chief Minister, italic as junior partner.

| State | Leader type | Member | State Constituency |
|---|---|---|---|
| Penang | Chief Minister | Chow Kon Yeow | Padang Kota |

| State | Leader type | Member | State Constituency |
|---|---|---|---|
| Penang | Deputy Chief Minister II | Jagdeep Singh Deo | Datok Keramat |

=== Legislative leadership ===
| Portfolio | Office Bearer | Constituency |
|---|---|---|
| Deputy Speaker of the Dewan Rakyat | Alice Lau Kiong Yeng | Lanang |

| State | Leader type | Member | State Constituency |
|---|---|---|---|
| Malacca | Deputy Speaker | Kerk Chee Yee | Ayer Keroh |
| Pahang | Deputy Speaker | Lee Chin Chen | Bilut |
| Perak | Deputy Speaker | Jenny Choy Tsi Jen | Canning |
| Selangor | Speaker | Lau Weng San | Non-MLA |

=== Official opposition ===
| State | Leader type | Member | State Constituency |
|---|---|---|---|
| Johor | Balancing Force Leader | Andrew Chen Kah Eng | Stulang |
| Negeri Sembilan | Opposition Leader | Arul Kumar Jambunathan | Nilai |
| Sarawak | Opposition Leader | Chong Chieng Jen | Padungan |

== Election results ==
=== General election results ===
| Election | Total seats won | Seats contested | Total votes | Share of votes | Outcome of election | Election leader |
|---|---|---|---|---|---|---|
| 1964 (as PAP) | 1 / 144 | 11 | 42,130 | 2.0% | ▲1 seats; Opposition | Lee Kuan Yew |
| 1969 | 13 / 144 | 24 | 286,606 | 12.1% | ▲12 seats; Opposition | Goh Hock Guan |
| 1974 | 9 / 144 | 46 | 387,845 | 18.3% | ▼4 seats; Opposition | Lim Kit Siang |
| 1978 | 16 / 154 | 53 | 664,433 | 19.1% | ▲7 seats; Opposition | Lim Kit Siang |
| 1982 | 9 / 154 | 63 | 815,473 | 19.6% | ▼7 seats; Opposition | Lim Kit Siang |
| 1986 | 24 / 154 | 64 | 968,009 | 21.0% | ▲15 seats; Opposition | Lim Kit Siang |
| 1990 | 20 / 180 | 57 | 985,228 | 17.13% | ▼4 seats; Opposition coalition (Gagasan Rakyat) | Lim Kit Siang |
| 1995 | 9 / 192 | 50 | 712,175 | 12.0% | ▼11 seats; Opposition coalition (Gagasan Rakyat) | Lim Kit Siang |
| 1999 | 10 / 193 | 47 | 830,870 | 12.53% | ▲1 seats; Opposition coalition (Barisan Alternatif) | Lim Kit Siang |
| 2004 | 12 / 219 | 44 | 687,340 | 9.9% | ▲2 seats; Opposition | Kerk Kim Hock (Secretary-general); Lim Kit Siang (Chairman, Central Policy & Strategic Planning Commission) |
| 2008 | 28 / 222 | 47 | 1,118,025 | 13.77% | ▲16 seats; Opposition coalition (Pakatan Rakyat) | Lim Guan Eng (Secretary-general); Lim Kit Siang (Parliamentary Leader) |
| 2013 | 38 / 222 | 51 | 1,736,601 | 15.71% | ▲10 seats; Opposition coalition (Pakatan Rakyat) | Lim Guan Eng (Secretary-general); Lim Kit Siang (Parliamentary Leader) |
| 2018 | 42 / 222 | 47 | 2,040,068 | 18.48% | ▲4 seats; Governing coalition, later Opposition coalition (Pakatan Harapan) | Lim Guan Eng (Secretary-general); Lim Kit Siang (Parliamentary Leader) |
| 2022 | 40 / 222 | 55 | 2,422,577 | 15.61% | ▼2 seats; Governing Coalition (Pakatan Harapan) | Lim Guan Eng (Chairman); Anthony Loke (Secretary-general) |

=== State election results ===
| State assembly | Election | Votes | % | Seats | Won/contested | +/– | Position (Note: As part of electoral coalition.) | Status |
|---|---|---|---|---|---|---|---|---|
| Perlis | 2022 | 1,512 | 1.0 | 0 / 15 | 0 / 1 | Steady | 2nd (Pakatan Harapan) | No seats |
| Kedah | 2023 | 21,949 | 1.9 | 1 / 36 | 1 / 2 | ▼1 | ▼2nd (Pakatan Harapan) | Opposition |
| Kelantan | 2023 | Did not contest | | | | | | No seats |
| Terengganu | 2023 | Did not contest | | | | | | No seats |
| Penang | 2023 | 313,731 | 35.3 | 19 / 40 | 19 / 19 | Steady | 1st (Pakatan Harapan) | PH–BN |
| Perak | 2022 | 341,337 | 23.0 | 18 / 59 | 18 / 19 | Steady | ▼2nd (Pakatan Harapan) | BN–PH |
| Pahang | 2022 | 75,698 | 8.7 | 6 / 42 | 6 / 8 | ▼1 | ▼3rd (Pakatan Harapan) | BN–PH |
| Selangor | 2023 | 582,881 | 21.8 | 15 / 56 | 15 / 15 | ▼1 | 1st (Pakatan Harapan) | PH–BN |
| Negeri Sembilan | 2026 | 132,304 | 20.7 | 9 / 36 | 9 / 11 | ▼2 | ▼2nd (Pakatan Harapan) | Opposition |
| Malacca | 2026 | 74,068 | 15.1 | 4 / 28 | 4 / 7 | Steady | 2nd (Pakatan Harapan) | Opposition |
| Johor | 2026 | 291,273 | 15.6 | 6 / 56 | 6 / 17 | ▼4 | 2nd (Pakatan Harapan) | Balancing force |
| Sabah | 2025 | 34,786 | 3.1 | 0 / 73 | 0 / 8 | ▼6 | ▼6th (Pakatan Harapan) | No seats |
| Sarawak | 2021 | 55,308 | 7.4 | 2 / 82 | 2 / 26 | ▼5 | ▼3rd (Pakatan Harapan) | Opposition |

Note

| State election | State Legislative Assembly | | | | | | | | | | | | | |
| State election | Perlis | Kedah | Kelantan | Terengganu | Penang | Perak | Pahang | Selangor | Negeri Sembilan | Malacca | Johor | Sabah | Sarawak | Total won / Total contested |
|---|---|---|---|---|---|---|---|---|---|---|---|---|---|---|
| 2/3 majority | 2 / 3 | 2 / 3 | 2 / 3 | 2 / 3 | 2 / 3 | 2 / 3 | 2 / 3 | 2 / 3 | 2 / 3 | 2 / 3 | 2 / 3 | 2 / 3 | 2 / 3 | |
| 1964 (as PAP) | 0 / 12 | 0 / 24 | 0 / 30 | 0 / 24 | 0 / 24 | 0 / 40 | 0 / 24 | 0 / 28 | 0 / 24 | 0 / 20 | 0 / 32 | | | 0 / 15 |
| 1969 | 0 / 12 | 0 / 24 | 0 / 30 | 0 / 24 | 3 / 24 | 6 / 40 | 0 / 24 | 9 / 28 | 8 / 24 | 4 / 20 | 1 / 32 | | 0 / 48 | 31 / 57 |
| 1974 | 0 / 12 | 1 / 26 | 0 / 36 | 0 / 28 | 2 / 27 | 11 / 42 | 0 / 32 | 1 / 33 | 3 / 24 | 4 / 20 | 1 / 32 | | 0 / 48 | 23 / 120 |
| 1978 | 0 / 12 | 0 / 26 | | 0 / 28 | 5 / 27 | 9 / 42 | 0 / 32 | 3 / 33 | 3 / 24 | 4 / 20 | 1 / 32 | | | 25 / 127 |
| 1979 | | | | | | | | | | | | | 0 / 48 | 0 / 11 |
| 1982 | 0 / 12 | 0 / 26 | 0 / 36 | 0 / 28 | 2 / 27 | 4 / 42 | 1 / 32 | 1 / 33 | 2 / 24 | 2 / 20 | 0 / 32 | | | 12 / 131 |
| 1983 | | | | | | | | | | | | | 0 / 48 | 0 / 7 |
| 1985 | | | | | | | | | | | | 0 / 48 | | 0 / 3 |
| 1986 | 0 / 14 | 0 / 28 | 0 / 39 | 0 / 32 | 10 / 33 | 13 / 46 | 1 / 33 | 5 / 42 | 4 / 28 | 3 / 20 | 1 / 36 | 0 / 48 | | 37 / 118 |
| 1987 | | | | | | | | | | | | | 0 / 56 | 0 / 11 |
| 1990 | 0 / 14 | 1 / 28 | 0 / 39 | 0 / 32 | 14 / 33 | 13 / 46 | 1 / 33 | 6 / 42 | 4 / 28 | 3 / 20 | 3 / 36 | 0 / 48 | | 45 / 94 |
| 1991 | | | | | | | | | | | | | 0 / 56 | 0 / 18 |
| 1994 | | | | | | | | | | | | 0 / 48 | | 0 / 2 |
| 1995 | 0 / 15 | 0 / 36 | 0 / 43 | 0 / 32 | 1 / 33 | 1 / 52 | 1 / 38 | 3 / 48 | 2 / 32 | 3 / 25 | 0 / 40 | | | 11 / 103 |
| 1996 | | | | | | | | | | | | | 3 / 62 | 3 / 6 |
| 1999 | 0 / 15 | 0 / 36 | 0 / 43 | 0 / 32 | 1 / 33 | 4 / 52 | 1 / 38 | 1 / 48 | 0 / 32 | 4 / 25 | 0 / 40 | 0 / 48 | | 11 / 88 |
| 2001 | | | | | | | | | | | | | 1 / 62 | 1 / 13 |
| 2004 | 0 / 15 | 0 / 36 | 0 / 45 | 0 / 32 | 1 / 40 | 7 / 59 | 1 / 42 | 2 / 56 | 2 / 36 | 2 / 28 | 0 / 56 | 0 / 60 | | 15 / 104 |
| 2006 | | | | | | | | | | | | | 6 / 71 | 6 / 12 |
| 2008 | 0 / 15 | 1 / 36 | 0 / 45 | 0 / 32 | 19 / 40 | 18 / 59 | 2 / 42 | 13 / 56 | 10 / 36 | 5 / 28 | 4 / 56 | 1 / 60 | | 73 / 102 |
| 2011 | | | | | | | | | | | | | 12 / 71 | 12 / 15 |
| 2013 | 0 / 15 | 2 / 36 | 0 / 45 | 0 / 32 | 19 / 40 | 18 / 59 | 7 / 42 | 15 / 56 | 11 / 36 | 6 / 28 | 13 / 56 | 4 / 60 | | 95 / 103 |
| 2016 | | | | | | | | | | | | | 7 / 82 | 7 / 31 |
| 2018 | 0 / 15 | 2 / 36 | 0 / 45 | 0 / 32 | 19 / 40 | 18 / 59 | 7 / 42 | 16 / 56 | 11 / 36 | 8 / 28 | 14 / 56 | 6 / 60 | | 101 / 104 |
| 2020 | | | | | | | | | | | | 6 / 73 | | 6 / 7 |
| 2021 | | | | | | | | | | 4 / 28 | | | | 4 / 8 |
| 2021 | | | | | | | | | | | | | 2 / 82 | 2 / 26 |
| 2022 | | | | | | | | | | | 10 / 56 | | | 10 / 14 |
| 2022 | 0 / 15 | | | | | 18 / 59 | 6 / 42 | | | | | | | 24 / 30 |
| 2023 | | 1 / 36 | 0 / 45 | 0 / 32 | 19 / 40 | | | 15 / 56 | 11 / 36 | | | | | 46 / 47 |
| 2025 | | | | | | | | | | | | 0 / 73 | | 0 / 8 |
| 2026 | | | | | | | | | 9 / 36 | 4 / 28 | 6 / 56 | | 0 / 82 | 19 / 35 |

== Criticism ==
The Democratic Action Party is heavily criticized among conservative Malays as one of its ideologies namely Malaysian Malaysia are seen as a threat to their privileges in the Constitution.

== See also ==
- List of political parties in Malaysia
- Pakatan Harapan
- Politics of Malaysia
