= 2025 Democratic Action Party National Congress =

2025 Malaysian political event held in Shah Alam, Selangor

2025 Democratic Action Party National Convention
Convention
- Date(s): 16 March 2025
- City: Shah Alam, Selangor
- Venue: IDCC Ideal Convention Centre
- Chair: Leong Ngah Ngah (Speaker); Noorita Sual & Kesavadas Achyuthan Nair (Deputy Speakers)
- Keynote speaker: Anthony Loke Siew Fook (Secretary-General)
- Notable speakers: Anwar Ibrahim (Prime Minister); Lim Guan Eng (National Chairman)

Voting
- Total delegates: 4,203
- Ballots: 89,885

The 2025 Democratic Action Party National Congress, or the 18th Democratic Action Party National Congress, was a Malaysian political event that was held in IDCC Ideal Convention Centre, Shah Alam, Selangor on 16 March 2025. The event elected the Central Executive Committee (CEC), the highest decision-making body of the Democratic Action Party (DAP), a component party of the Pakatan Harapan (PH) coalition, for the next 3-year term, from 2025 to 2028. During the congress, the delegates voted for candidates for the CEC. The 30 candidates who won the most votes, with 9 women, were elected to the CEC.

== Background ==
The congress is the 18th in the history of the party. It is the first since the party became part of the federal government, as a component party of the PH coalition, which formed a coalition government with the Members of Parliament (MPs) and Senators of Barisan Nasional (BN), Gabungan Parti Sarawak (GPS), Gabungan Rakyat Sabah (GRS), Heritage Party (WARISAN) with the support, confidence and supply of the Social Democratic Harmony Party (KDM), Parti Bangsa Malaysia (PBM) and independent MPs as a result of a hung parliament elected in the 2022 general election. The government led by Chairman of PH Anwar Ibrahim as Prime Minister was named the 'Unity Government', named after the large number of coalitions and parties forming the government despite technically not being a unity government, a type of government where there is no opposition in Parliament, however, Perikatan Nasional (PN) and the Malaysian United Democratic Alliance (MUDA) are the opposition coalition and party in Parliament, and 'Madani Government', named after the government slogan 'Malaysia Madani'. The previous 17 congresses were held when the party was in the opposition, with the 17th and most recent one on 20 March 2022. Although this is the second time the party became a part of the government, the party did not hold a congress during its brief first term in government, from the 10 May 2018 to 24 February 2020, the time between the 16th on 12 November 2017 and 17th congress. The congress was to elect the CEC for the 3-year term from 2025 to 2028, approve the amendments to the party constitution, among others.

== Congress leadership and attendance ==
=== Officers and attendees ===
The chair of the congress was State Advisor of DAP of Pahang Leong Ngah Ngah and the vice chairs of the congress were Senators Noorita Sual and Kesavadas Achyuthan Nair while the returning officer of the CEC election was Desmond Tan. On 3 March 2025, Sim confirmed the attendance of Prime Minister, Minister of Finance, Chairman of PH, President of the People's Justice Party (PKR) and MP for Tambun Anwar Ibrahim, Minister of Agriculture and Food Security, President of the National Trust Party (AMANAH) and MP for Kota Raja Mohamad Sabu, Minister of Entrepreneur and Cooperatives Development, President of the United Progressive Kinabalu Organisation (UPKO) and MP for Penampang Ewon Benedick as well as Deputy Minister of Domestic Trade and Costs of Living, Senator and Secretary-General of PKR Fuziah Salleh as the guests of the congress representing fellow PH component parties. Anwar, Mohamad and Ewon later attended. In addition to them, Minister of Home Affairs, Senator and Advisor of the Management Committee of PKR Saifuddin Nasution Ismail, Deputy Minister of National Unity, Senator and Vice President of PKR Saraswathy Kandasami, Deputy Minister of Defence, MP for Alor Gajah and Vice President of AMANAH Adly Zahari also turned up at the congress.

== Selection of delegates ==
The Constitution of DAP states that each party branch of at least 25 members has to send 2 delegates, usually the chairman and vice chairman, to the congress to vote in the CEC election. An additional delegate, usually the secretary, is allowed for branches with membership exceeding 50 and for branches exceeding 100 members, an incremental addition is allowed for every additional 100 paid up members. A branch usually sent 2 to 3 delegates. All elected representatives, the MPs and Members of the Legislative Assembly (MLAs) of the party, alongside other incumbent CEC members are also entitled to attend the congress as delegates. The party had 40 MPs and 90 MLAs at the time of the congress. According to Khoo Poay Tiong, the incumbent Assistant National Organising Secretary, the number of delegates was 4,203, the highest in the history of the party congress. The delegates were from 1,650 party branches nationwide, with an average number of 2.55 delegates per branch.

== Nominating and voting ==
Each party branch nominated 30 candidates for the CEC, and each candidates must receive at least 2 branch nominations to qualify for the election. 107 party members qualified. The party notified the candidates, and they were given 14 days to decide whether to accept the nomination, the candidates who accepted were still allowed to withdraw from the election. The votes received by the withdrawn candidates were invalid. The nominations closed on 31 January 2025 and the deadline on accepting the nominations was on 14 February 2025. After that, the party headquarters verified the list of candidates. The full list of candidates for the election was then announced by Sim on 3 March 2025. 70 candidates accepted. 6 later withdrew from the election, they were Edmund Teoh Kheng Yaik on 14 March 2025 as well as Kalidas Komarawelo, Kaliyappan P Renganathan, Nicole Tan Lee Koon, Phee Syn Tze and Soon Lip Chee on 15 March 2025. 64 others remained in the election. According to Khoo, the party appointed a private international audit firm to handle the vote counting and ballot opening process to ensure the transparency and fairness of the election. Due to the large number of delegates and the limited venue capacity, only the delegates were allowed to enter the hall during the congress. The party headquarters also named a 300-member special task force to maintain order at the venue. Clause VIII Section 14 allows each delegate to vote for 30 members to elect the CEC for the upcoming term of 3 years.

== Results ==
=== Candidates ===
Clause VIII Section 16 of the Constitution of DAP states that a 30% quota of the CEC elected membership, which is 9 members, is reserved for female candidates. The full list of candidates was announced on 3 March 2025. There were 70 candidates, out of them, 55 were men while 15 were women.

Elected
Co-opted
Defeated
Withdrawn

No.	Name	Gender	Number of votes	Rank	Position	CEC position before the election	CEC position after the election	References
18	Gobind Singh Deo	Male	2,785	1	Minister of Digital; MP for Damansara	National Deputy Chairman	National Chairman	
11	Chong Chieng Jen	Male	2,631	2	Chairman of the National Institute of Occupational Safety and Health (NIOSH); State Leader of the Opposition of Sarawak; MP for Stampin; MLA for Padungan; Vice President of Pakatan Harapan; State Chairman of DAP of Sarawak	National Vice Chairman; Chairman of the Disciplinary Committee	National Vice Chairman; Parliamentary Leader	
59	Teo Nie Ching	Female	2,585	3	Deputy Minister of Communications; MP for Kulai; Women Chief of DAP; State Chairperson of DAP of Johor	National Publicity Secretary	National Vice Chairperson	
35	Ng Suee Lim	Male	2,563	4	Selangor State EXCO Member; MLA for Sekinchan; State Vice Chairman of DAP of Selangor	Assistant National Organising Secretary	National Vice Chairman	
33	Anthony Loke Siew Fook	Male	2,508	5	Minister of Transport; MP for Seremban; MLA for Chennah; Deputy President of Pakatan Harapan; Chief Whip of Pakatan Harapan; State Chairman of DAP of Negeri Sembilan	Secretary-General	Secretary-General	
67	Yeo Bee Yin	Female	2,503	6	MP for Puchong; Deputy Women Chief of DAP; State Secretary of DAP of Selangor	–	National Publicity Secretary	
36	Ng Sze Han	Male	2,437	7	Selangor State EXCO Member; MLA for Kinrara; State Chairman of DAP of Selangor	Assistant National Treasurer	Assistant National Treasurer	
23	Khoo Poay Tiong	Male	2,390	8	Chairman of the Secretariat of the Malaysian Chinese New Village Division; MP for Kota Melaka; State Chairman of DAP of Melaka	Assistant National Organising Secretary	National Organising Secretary	
8	Chan Foong Hin	Male	2,362	9	Deputy Minister of Plantation and Commodities; MP for Kota Kinabalu; State Deputy Chairman of DAP of Sabah	Committee Member	National Policy Director	
64	Wong Kah Woh	Male	2,265	10	Deputy Minister of Education; MP for Taiping; State Secretary of DAP of Perak	National Political Education Director	National Election Director	
48	Steven Sim Chee Keong	Male	2,262	11	Minister of Human Resources; MP for Bukit Mertajam; State Chairman of DAP of Penang	National Organising Secretary	Deputy Secretary-General	
63	Vivian Wong Shir Yee	Female	2,244	12	MP for Sandakan; State Secretary of DAP of Sabah	Committee Member	Assistant National Political Education Director	
38	Nga Kor Ming	Male	2,215	13	Minister of Housing and Local Government; MP for Teluk Intan; MLA for Kepayang; Parliamentary Leader of DAP; State Chairman of DAP of Perak	National Vice Chairman	National Deputy Chairman	
24	Lee Chin Chen	Male	2,172	14	Pahang State Deputy Speaker; MLA for Bilut; State Chairman of DAP of Pahang	Committee Member	Assistant National Organising Secretary	
69	Hannah Yeoh Tseow Suan	Female	2,169	15	Minister of Youth and Sports; MP for Segambut; Women Committee Member of DAP; Vice Chairperson of DAP of Kuala Lumpur	Assistant National Publicity Secretary	Deputy Secretary-General	
1	Alice Lau Kiong Yieng	Female	2,156	16	Deputy Speaker of the Dewan Rakyat II; MP for Lanang; Women Treasurer of DAP; State Deputy Chairperson of DAP of Sarawak	Committee Member	Assistant International Secretary	
32	Liow Cai Tung	Female	2,139	17	MLA for Johor Jaya; Women Organising Secretary of DAP; State Organising Secretary of DAP of Johor	–	Committee Member	
58	Teo Kok Seong	Male	2,107	18	Negeri Sembilan State EXCO Member; MLA for Bahau; State Vice Chairman of DAP of Negeri Sembilan	Committee Member	Committee Member	
12	Chow Kon Yeow	Male	2,101	19	Chief Minister of Penang; MP for Batu Kawan; MLA for Padang Kota	National Vice Chairman	Committee Member	
54	Syahredzan Johan	Male	2,065	20	MP for Bangi; State Political Education Director of DAP of Selangor	Committee Member	National Vice Chairman	
70	Young Syefura Othman	Female	1,943	21	MP for Bentong; Vice Women Chief of DAP; State Vice Chairperson of DAP of Pahang	Committee Member	Assistant National Publicity Secretary	
27	Liew Chin Tong	Male	1,929	22	Deputy Minister of Investment, Trade and Industry; MP for Iskandar Puteri; MLA for Perling; State Committee Member of DAP of Johor	Deputy Secretary-General	National Strategic Director	
44	Ramkarpal Singh	Male	1,917	23	MP for Bukit Gelugor; State Deputy Chairman of DAP of Penang	Head of the Legal Bureau	Deputy Secretary-General; Head of the Legal Bureau	
5	Arul Kumar Jambunathan	Male	1,747	24	Negeri Sembilan State EXCO Member; MLA for Nilai; State Vice Chairman of DAP of Negeri Sembilan	–	National Vice Chairman	
21	Kasthuriraani Patto	Female	1,722	25	Vice Women Chief of DAP	Assistant International Secretary	International Secretary	
29	Lim Guan Eng	Male	1,719	26	MP for Bagan; MLA for Air Putih	National Chairman	Advisor (16 March 2025 – 23 June 2025); Advisor I (since 23 June 2025)	
25	Howard Lee Chuan How	Male	1,703	27	MP for Ipoh Timor; State Treasurer of DAP of Perak	Committee Member	National Political Education Director	
65	Wong Shu Qi	Female	1,655	28	Chairperson of the Talent Corporation Malaysia Berhad (TalentCorp); MP for Kluang; State Deputy Chairperson of DAP of Johor	Assistant National Political Education Director	Assistant National Publicity Secretary	
55	Tan Hong Pin	Male	1,585	29	MP for Bakri	Committee Member	Assistant National Organising Secretary	
39	Ngeh Koo Ham	Male	1,584	30	MP for Beruas; State Advisor of DAP of Perak	–	National Treasurer	
30	Lim Hui Ying	Female	1,573	31	Deputy Minister of Finance; MP for Tanjong; State Secretary of DAP of Penang	Committee Member	Committee Member	
50	Sivakumar Varatharaju	Male	1,542	32	MP for Batu Gajah; State Deputy Chairman of DAP of Perak	Deputy Secretary-General	Committee Member	
22	Kelvin Yii Lee Wuen	Male	1,419	33	Political Secretary to the Minister of Human Resources; MP for Bandar Kuching; Youth Chief of Pakatan Harapan (Note: Replaced with Woo Kah Leong in the position on 11 March 2025, 5 days before the election.); State Publicity Secretary of DAP of Sarawak	–	Committee Member	
60	Teresa Kok Suh Sim	Female	1,331	34	Deputy Chairperson of the Public Accounts Committee (PAC); MP for Seputeh; Vice Chairperson of DAP of Kuala Lumpur	National Vice Chairperson	–	
46	Sanisvara Nethaji Rayer Rajaji Rayer	Male	1,311	35	MP for Jelutong; State Committee Member of DAP of Penang	Committee Member	–	
31	Lim Lip Eng	Male	1,300	36	MP for Kepong; Secretary of DAP of Kuala Lumpur	Committee Member	–	
13	Chow Yu Hui	Male	1,261	37	MP for Raub; State Political Education Director of DAP of Pahang	–	–	
17	Ganabatirau Veraman	Male	1,254	38	MP for Klang; State Deputy Chairman of DAP of Selangor	Assistant National Publicity Secretary	–	
61	Tiew Way Keng	Female	1,196	39	Senator; State Organising Secretary of DAP of Selangor	–	–	
26	Leng Chau Yen	Female	1,127	40	Melaka State Deputy EXCO Member; MLA for Bandar Hilir; State Vice Chairperson of DAP of Melaka	–	–	
14	Ean Yong Hian Wah	Male	1,031	41	Chairman of the Port Klang Authority (PKA); Executive Chairman of the Orgabio Holdings Berhad; State Vice Chairman of DAP of Selangor	–	–	
66	Vincent Wu Him Ven	Male	1,026	42	–	Committee Member	Committee Member	
68	Yeoh Soon Hin	Male	1,014	43	Chairman of the Penang Port Commission (PPC); Deputy Chairman of Tourism Malaysia; State Vice Chairman of DAP of Penang	–	Committee Member	
16	Ben Fong Kok Seng	Male	970	44	Treasurer of DAP of Kuala Lumpur	–	–	
10	Chew Chong Sin	Male	953	45	MLA for Mengkibol; State Assistant Treasurer of DAP of Johor	–	–	
56	Tan Kok Yew	Male	857	46	State Chairman of DAP of Kedah	–	–	
28	Lim Eng Guan	Male	756	47	–	–	–	
52	Thomas Su Keong Siong	Male	755	48	MLA for Ketari; State Organising Secretary of DAP of Pahang	Committee Member	–	
57	Tengku Zulpuri Shah Raja Puji	Male	694	49	MLA for Tras; State Committee Member of DAP of Pahang	Deputy Secretary-General	–	
7	Boo Cheng Hau	Male	654	50	–	–	–	
43	Rajiv Rishyakaran	Male	494	51	MLA for Bukit Gasing; State Assistant Treasurer of DAP of Selangor	–	–	
47	Sheikh Umar Bagharib Ali	Male	478	52	Chairman of the Malaysia Pineapple Industry Board (MPIB); State Vice Chairman of DAP of Johor	Committee Member	Committee Member	
37	Ng Yak Howe	Male	443	53	MLA for Bentayan; State Committee Member of DAP of Johor	–	–	
34	Mordi Bimol	Male	299	54	MP for Mas Gading; State Vice Chairman of DAP of Sarawak	–		
62	Veerapan Superamaniam	Male	296	55	Negeri Sembilan State EXCO Member; MLA for Repah	–	–	
3	Apalasamy Jataliah	Male	280	56	–	–	–	
42	Pooi Weng Keong	Male	268	57	–	–	–	
45	Ravi Apalasamy	Male	198	58	–	–	–	
6	Azaha Abdul Rani	Male	191	59	–	–	–	
49	Sinasamy Subramaniam	Male	178	60	–	–	–	
53	Supian Zaharin	Male	170	61	–	–	–	
2	Ananda Rao Apparalam	Male	156	62	–	–	–	
4	Arivom Namasivaya K Kannan	Male	138	63	–	–	–	
9	Chang Choon Bak	Male	109	64	–	–	–	
15	Edmund Teoh Kheng Yaik (Note: Withdrew from the election on 14 March 2025, 2 days before the election.)	Male	N/A		Publicity Secretary of DAP of Kuala Lumpur	–	–	
19	Kalidas Komarawelo (Note: Withdrew from the election on 15 March 2025, 1 day before the election.)	Male	N/A		–	–	–	
20	Kaliyappan P Renganathan	Male	N/A		–	–	–	
40	Nicole Tan Lee Koon	Female	N/A		Negeri Sembilan State EXCO Member; MLA for Bukit Kepayang; Women Assistant Secretary of DAP; State Committee Member of DAP of Negeri Sembilan	–	–	
41	Phee Syn Tze	Female	N/A		MLA for Sungai Puyu; State Committee Member of DAP of Penang	–	–	
51	Soon Lip Chee	Male	N/A		State Assistant Publicity Secretary of DAP of Penang	–	–	

=== Non-candidates co-opted to the CEC ===
5 non-candidates, Andrew Chen Kah Eng, Papparaidu Veraman, Thulsi Thivani Manogaran, Tony Pua Kiam Wee and Yap Yee Vonne were co-opted to the CEC on 23 June 2025. Chen, Papparaidu, Thulsi Thivani and Yap were co-opted as the Committee Members while Pua was co-opted as the Chairman of the Disciplinary Committee.

Co-opted

No.	Name	Gender	Position	CEC position before the election	CEC position after the election	Date co-opted	References
1	Andrew Chen Kah Eng	Male	State Leader of the Balancing Force of Johor; MLA for Stulang; State Secretary of DAP of Johor	–	Committee Member	23 June 2025	
1	Papparaidu Veraman	Male	Selangor State EXCO Member; MLA for Banting; State Assistant Organising Secretary of DAP of Selangor	–	Committee Member	23 June 2025	
1	Thulsi Thivani Manogaran	Female	MLA for Buntong; State Assistant Publicity Secretary of DAP of Perak; Women Assistant Organising Secretary of DAP	–	Committee Member	23 June 2025	
1	Tony Pua Kiam Wee	Male	Policy Advisor to the Secretary-General of DAP	–	Chairman of the Disciplinary Committee	23 June 2025	
1	Yap Yee Vonne	Female	Political Secretary to the Minister of Youth and Sports; Youth Committee Member of DAP; Youth Chief of DAP of Kuala Lumpur	–	Committee Member	23 June 2025	

=== Outgoing CEC members ===
The following CEC members did not contest in the election for re-election. Tan Kok Wai was later co-opted to the CEC as the Advisor II on 23 June 2025.

Co-opted

No.	Name	Gender	Position	CEC position	Date confirmed	Reason	Remarks	References
1	Ronnie Liu Tian Khiew	Male	–	Committee Member	24 June 2023	Left the party	–	
2	Tan Kok Wai	Male	MP for Cheras; Chairman of DAP of Kuala Lumpur	Advisor	19 February 2025	Retired	Co-opted to the CEC as the Advisor II on 23 June 2025.	
3	Fong Kui Lun	Male	MP for Bukit Bintang; Deputy Chairman of DAP of Kuala Lumpur	National Treasurer	19 February 2025	Retired	–	
4	Kulasegaran Murugeson	Male	Deputy Minister in the Prime Minister's Department (Law and Institutional Reforms); MP for Ipoh Barat; Vice President of Pakatan Harapan	National Vice Chairman	21 February 2025	Retired	–	
5	Jannie Lasimbang	Female	Chairperson of the Rural Development Corporation (KPD) of Sabah; MLA for Kapayan; State Vice Chairperson of DAP of Sabah	International Secretary	3 March 2025	Not contesting for re-election	–	

=== CEC leadership changes ===
Party leadership changes following the 2025 CEC election
Position	Holder before	Holder after	References
Advisor I	Position established	Lim Guan Eng	
Advisor II	Position established	Tan Kok Wai	
Advisor (20 March 2022 – 23 June 2025)	Tan Kok Wai	Lim Guan Eng	
National Chairman	Lim Guan Eng	Gobind Singh Deo	
National Deputy Chairman	Gobind Singh Deo	Nga Kor Ming	
National Vice Chairperson	Chong Chieng Jen; Chow Kon Yeow; Kulasegaran Murugeson; Nga Kor Ming; Teresa Kok Suh Sim	Arul Kumar Jambunathan; Chong Chieng Jen; Ng Suee Lim; Syahredzan Johan; Teo Nie Ching	
Secretary-General	Anthony Loke Siew Fook	Anthony Loke Siew Fook	
Deputy Secretary-General	Liew Chin Tong; Sivakumar Varatharaju; Tengku Zulpuri Shah Raja Puji	Hannah Yeoh Tseow Suan; Ramkarpal Singh; Steven Sim Chee Keong	
National Treasurer	Fong Kui Lun	Ngeh Koo Ham	
Assistant National Treasurer	Ng Sze Han	Ng Sze Han	
National Organising Secretary	Steven Sim Chee Keong	Khoo Poay Tiong	
Assistant National Organising Secretary	Khoo Poay Tiong; Ng Suee Lim	Lee Chin Chen; Tan Hong Pin	
National Publicity Secretary	Teo Nie Ching	Yeo Bee Yin	
Assistant National Publicity Secretary	Ganabatirau Veraman; Hannah Yeoh Tseow Suan	Wong Shu Qi; Young Syefura Othman	
International Secretary	Jannie Lasimbang	Kasthuriraani Patto	
Assistant International Secretary	Kasthuriraani Patto	Alice Lau Kiong Yieng	
National Political Education Director	Wong Kah Woh	Howard Lee Chuan How	
Assistant National Political Education Director	Wong Shu Qi	Vivian Wong Shir Yee	
National Strategic Director	Position established	Liew Chin Tong	
National Policy Director	Position established	Chan Foong Hin	
National Election Director	Position established	Wong Kah Woh	
Parliamentary Leader	Nga Kor Ming	Chong Chieng Jen	
Chairman of the Disiciplinary Committee	Chong Chieng Jen	Tony Pua Kiam Wee	
Head of the Legal Bureau	Ramkarpal Singh	Ramkarpal Singh	
Committee Member	Alice Lau Kiong Yieng; Chan Foong Hin; Howard Lee Chuan How; Lee Chin Chen; Lim Hui Ying; Lim Lip Eng; Sanisvara Nethaji Rayer Rajaji Rayer; Sheikh Umar Bagharib Ali; Syahredzan Johan; Tan Hong Pin; Teo Kok Seong; Thomas Su Keong Siong; Vincent Wu Him Ven; Vivian Wong Shir Yee; Young Syefura Othman	Andrew Chen Kah Eng; Chow Kon Yeow; Kelvin Yii Lee Wuen; Lim Hui Ying; Liow Cai Tung; Papparaidu Veraman; Sheikh Umar Bagharib Ali; Sivakumar Varatharaju; Vincent Wu Him Ven; Teo Kok Seong; Thulsi Thivani Manogaran; Yap Yee Vonne; Yeoh Soon Hin	

== Controversies and issues ==
=== Lim Guan Eng ===
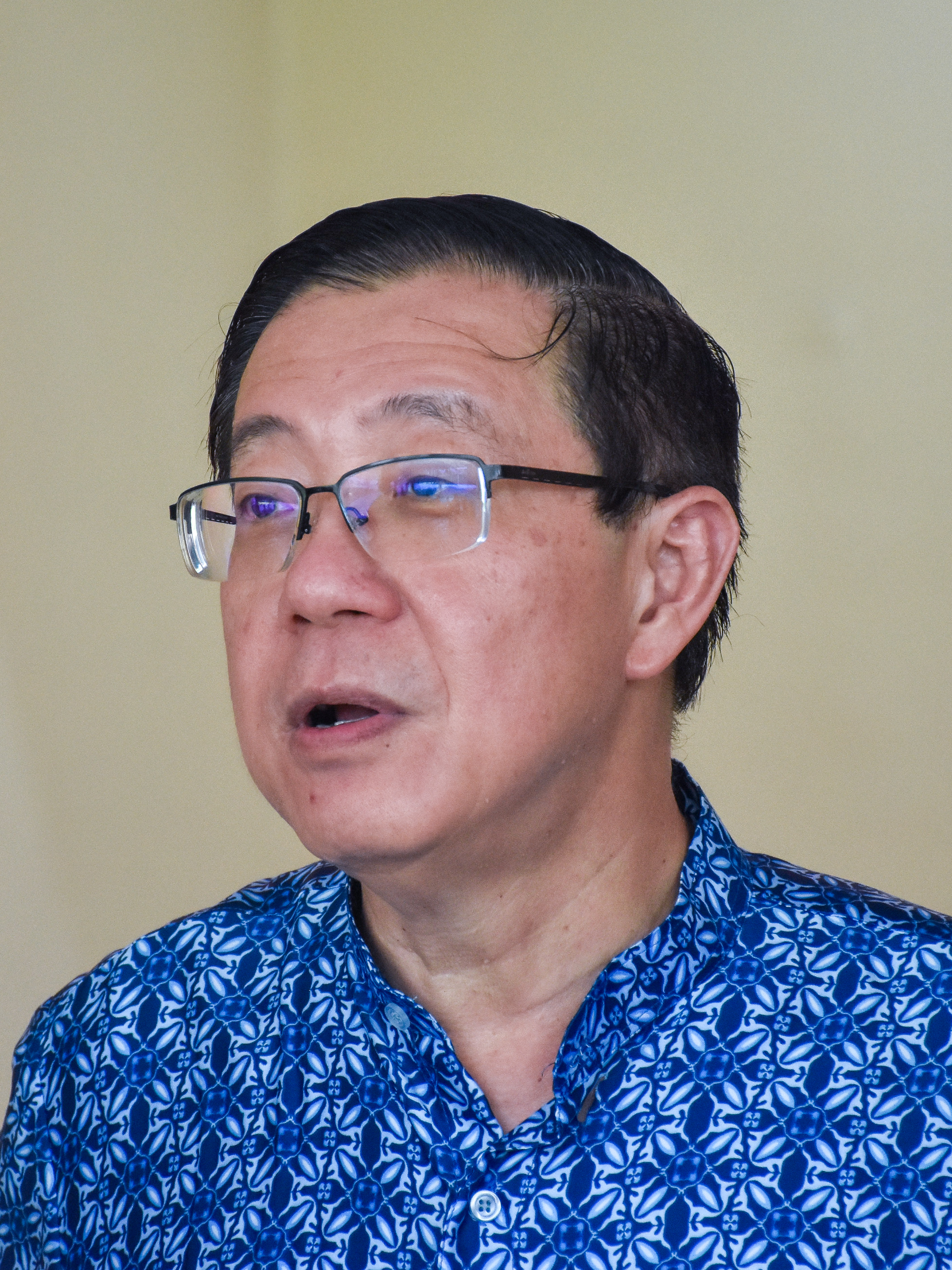
Lim Guan Eng, the incumbent National Chairman of DAP

There was public attention to Lim Guan Eng, the incumbent National Chairman, on whether he would contest, win in the CEC election and defend his position and issues related to him in the election, including his possible successors for the position. On 3 March 2025, Steven Sim Chee Keong, the incumbent National Organising Secretary announced the full list of candidates, Lim was confirmed to be contesting. Lim garnered 1,719 votes, placing him at the 26th place and was reelected to the CEC. Lim was later appointed as the new Advisor, replacing Tan Kok Wai while incumbent National Deputy Chairman Gobind Singh Deo who was reelected to the CEC with 2,785 votes, placing him at the 1st place, was named as the new National Chairman, taking over the position from Lim.

=== Candidate detained for alleged corruption ===
On 6 March 2025, it was reported that a CEC candidate had been detained by the Malaysian Anti-Corruption Commission (MACC) for 4 days over alleged corruption. The candidate, a former assistant to a DAP MP, was accused of awarding a school contract without an open tender. Party members reported him, believing the case is politically motivated ahead of the party election and linked to election rivalries. He allegedly designated a specific contractor for purchasing interactive whiteboards, leading to accusations of overpricing. However, he insisted that he followed procedures and submitted documents for approval, though the MP denies reviewing them. Meanwhile, the youth wing of DAP, the DAP Socialist Youth (DAPSY) of Seputeh condemned the MACC's actions, calling them selective investigations aimed at creating a chilling effect during the election. They urged authorities to remain neutral and uphold democratic fairness. In response, Teresa Kok Suh Sim, the incumbent National Vice Chairperson, CEC candidate and MP for Seputeh, expressed her shock over the MACC's investigation and detention of her two former aides, including Edmund Teoh Kheng Yaik, the Publicity Secretary of DAP of Kuala Lumpur and CEC candidate, for questioning. She emphasised that the case was unrelated to her, that she was unaware of the MACC's reasons, and that it was beyond her control. She urged against baseless accusations. She also linked the probe to the Federal Territories Education Department procurement inquiry. She mentioned that on 14 November 2024, she questioned the justification for the department's purchase of interactive whiteboards in Parliament. She had also shared her remarks in a speech publicly for transparency. She also expressed regret and disappointment over accusations from some party members and the families of the detained aides, who blamed her for the MACC's actions against them and emphasised MACC's independence, urging against speculation that could disrupt the investigation. Besides, a viral video showed a tearful woman, claiming to be Teoh's mother, demanding an explanation and answer from Kok after Teoh's detention by the MACC. She stated that Teoh had assisted Kok since he was 17 and expressed sadness and heartbreak over his arrest.

== See also ==
- Democratic Action Party
- Pakatan Harapan
- 2022 Democratic Action Party National Congress
- Politics of Malaysia
