= 2022 Democratic Action Party National Congress =

Malaysian political event held in Shah Alam, Selangor

2022 Democratic Action Party National Convention
Convention
- Date(s): 20 March 2022 (Note: Originally scheduled to be held 20 December 2020, but rescheduled due to the coronavirus pandemic.)
- City: Shah Alam, Selangor
- Venue: IDCC Ideal Convention Centre
- Chair: Chiew Chiu Sing
- Keynote speaker: Lim Guan Eng
- Notable speakers: Tan Kok Wai; Lim Guan Eng; Lim Kit Siang

Voting
- Total delegates: 4,149

The 2022 Democratic Action Party National Congress was a central executive committee (CEC) electing congress that was held on 20 March 2022, at the IDCC Ideal Convention Centre in Shah Alam, Selangor. At the congress, delegates of the Malaysian Democratic Action Party (DAP) formally chose former transport minister Anthony Loke Siew Fook and former finance minister Lim Guan Eng as the party's secretary-general and national chairman, respectively, for the term 2021–2024.

Originally scheduled to be held 20 December 2020, simultaneously at Shah Alam, Kota Kinabalu, and Kuching, the congress was twice postponed, first to 20 June 2021, then again to 20 March 2022, due to the ongoing coronavirus pandemic in Malaysia.

== Background ==
The congress was the 17th DAP National Congress. There was heightened public attention to this congress edition as it will see the DAP elect a new secretary-general with the outgoing Lim Guan Eng having served the maximum three terms provided by the party constitution.

=== Selection of delegates ===
The DAP's constitution provides for every party branch with at least 25 members to send 2 delegates as their representative. An additional delegate is allowed for branches with membership exceeding 50 and for branches exceeding 100 members, an incremental addition is allowed for every additional 100 paid up members. All of DAP's elected representatives, Members of Parliament (MPs) and Members of the Legislative Assembly (MLAs), alongside other incumbent CEC members are also entitled to attend the congress as delegates. Clause VIII Section 14 allows every delegate to vote for 30 members each to fill the CEC for the upcoming term.

At present, the northwestern states of Penang and Perak consists of the most branches and members, and thus, sends the highest number of delegates.

== Logistics ==
=== Delay ===
The congress was originally scheduled to be held 20 December 2020.

On 21 January 2022, it was announced that, due to the COVID-19 pandemic, the congress would again be delayed to 20 March 2022. Then-national organising secretary Anthony Loke announced that this decision was made by the party CEC in line with the advice given by Malaysia's Registrar of Societies (RoS) that the party should hold its triennial congress before 31 March 2022.

=== Health protocols ===
Due to the ongoing COVID-19 pandemic, a number of protocols have been put in place.

Participants at IDCC Ideal Convention Centre were required to wear personal protective equipment, undergo daily COVID-19 testing, and follow National Security Council (NSC) guidelines, and health ministry (MOH) standard operating procedures (SOPs).

== Congress leadership ==
=== Officers ===
Former Tanjong Batu MLA Chiew Chiu Sing served as the chair of the congress. The deputy chairs of the congress were Nilai MLA Arul Kumar Jambunathan and Seri Delima MLA Syerleena Abdul Rashid.

The congress' returning officer was John Lau Tiang Hua.

== Nominating and voting ==
=== Central Executive Committee voting ===
==== Vote ====
The table below reflects the delegate votes. (Note: Information of and votes received by candidates 05 through to 07 are missing due to a technical issue with the results video.) Voting results were audited and confirmed by Grant Thornton Malaysia PLT. A total of 93 candidates vied for 30 positions in the CEC.

Clause VIII Section 16 of the DAP's constitution state that a thirty per cent quota (30%) of the CEC is reserved for female members translating to at least nine members.

Co-opted into Central Executive Committee
Elected into the Central Executive Committee

No.	Candidate	Votes	Rank	Position/notability
21	Gobind Singh Deo	1,782	1	10th Communications and Multimedia Minister of Malaysia; MP for Puchong; Deputy National Chairman of Democratic Action Party; Chairman of Democratic Action Party, Selangor
14	Chow Kon Yeow	1,641	2	5th Chief Minister of Penang; MP for Tanjong; MLA for Padang Kota; National Vice-Chairman of Democratic Action Party; Chairman of Democratic Action Party, Penang
42	Anthony Loke Siew Fook	1,625	3	15th Transport Minister of Malaysia; MP for Seremban; MLA for Chennah; National Organising Secretary of Democratic Action Party; 2nd Parliamentary Leader of Democratic Action Party; Chairman of Democratic Action Party, Negeri Sembilan
79	Teresa Kok Suh Sim	1,373	4	11th Primary Industries Minister of Malaysia; MP for Seputeh; Deputy Secretary-General of Democratic Action Party
91	Hannah Yeoh Tseow Suan	1,346	5	10th Speaker of the Selangor State Legislative Assembly; MP for Segambut; Central Executive Committee Member of Democratic Action Party
19	Fong Kui Lun	1,341	6	MP for Bukit Bintang; National Treasurer of Democratic Action Party; Deputy Chairman of Democratic Action Party, Kuala Lumpur Federal Territory
61	Steven Sim Chee Keong	1,340	7	MP for Bukit Mertajam
37	Lim Guan Eng	1,311	8	17th Finance Minister of Malaysia; 4th Chief Minister of Penang; MP for Bagan; MLA for Air Putih; 5th Secretary-General of Democratic Action Party
50	Ng Sze Han	1,282	9	MLA for Kinrara
49	Ng Suee Lim	1,279	10	11th Speaker of the Selangor State Legislative Assembly; MLA for Sekinchan
69	Tan Kok Wai	1,263	11	2nd Special Envoy of the Prime Minister of Malaysia to China; MP for Cheras; 4th National Chairman of Democratic Action Party; Chairman of Democratic Action Party, Kuala Lumpur Federal Territory
52	Nga Kor Ming	1,262	12	19th Deputy Speaker of the Dewan Rakyat; MP for Teluk Intan; MLA for Aulong; Deputy Secretary-General of Democratic Action Party; Chairman of Democratic Action Party, Perak
43	Kulasegaran Murugeson	1,226	13	13th Human Resources Minister of Malaysia; MP for Ipoh Barat; National Vice-Chairman of Democratic Action Party
40	Lim Lip Eng	1,156	14	MP for Kepong
38	Lim Hui Ying	1,155	15	Senator of Malaysia for Penang
11	Chong Chieng Jen	1,154	16	MP for Stampin; MLA for Padungan; National Vice-Chairman of Democratic Action Party; Chairman of Democratic Action Party, Sarawak
03	Alice Lau Kiong Yieng	1,119	17	MP for Lanang; Deputy Chairman of Democratic Action Party, Sarawak
08	Chan Foong Hin	1,101	18	MP for Kota Kinabalu
77	Teo Nie Ching	1,071	19	MP for Kulai; International Secretary of Democratic Action Party; Deputy Chairman of Democratic Action Party, Johor
41	Ronnie Liu Tian Khiew	1,070	20	MLA for Sungai Pelek; Central Executive Committee Member of Democratic Action Party
86	Wong Kah Woh	1,069	21	MP for Ipoh Timor; Central Executive Committee Member of Democratic Action Party
35	Liew Chin Tong	1,008	22	MLA for Perling; National Director of Political Education of Democratic Action Party; Chairman of Democratic Action Party, Johor
68	Tan Hong Pin	992	23	
92	Young Syefura Othman	991	24	MLA for Ketari
27	Kasthuriraani Patto	978	25	MP for Batu Kawan
76	Teo Kok Seong	976	26	Negeri Sembilan State Executive Councillor; MLA for Bahau
66	Thomas Su Keong Siong	953	27	MP for Kampar; Assistant National Organising Secretary of Democratic Action Party
89	Vincent Wu Him Ven	950	28	
29	Khoo Poay Tiong	940	29	MP for Kota Melaka; Assistant National Organising Secretary of Democratic Action Party
88	Wong Shu Qi	939	30	MP for Kluang
70	Tan Kok Yew	914	31	MLA for Derga; Chairman of Democratic Action Party, Kedah
55	P. Ramasamy Palanisamy	911	32	Deputy Chief Minister II of Penang; MLA for Perai; Deputy Chairman of Democratic Action Party, Penang
80	Tey Kok Kiew	903	33	
53	Ngeh Koo Ham	882	34	MP for Beruas; Assistant National Treasurer of Democratic Action Party
23	Jannie Lasimbang	877	35	MLA for Kapayan; Central Executive Committee Member of Democratic Action Party
63	Sivakumar Varatharaju Naidu	858	36	MP for Batu Gajah; Deputy Secretary-General of Democratic Action Party
90	Yeo Bee Yin	857	37	11th Energy, Science, Technology, Environment and Climate Change Minister of Malaysia; MP for Bakri; Assistant National Publicity Secretary of Democratic Action Party
30	Lee Chin Chin	853	38	MLA for Bilut
31	Howard Lee Chuan How	833	39	MLA for Pasir Pinji
12	Chong Eng	793	40	Penang State Executive Councillor; MLA for Padang Lalang; Central Executive Committee Member of Democratic Action Party
20	Ganabatirau Veraman	758	41	MLA for Kota Kemuning
56	Tony Pua Kiam Wee	756	42	MP for Damansara; National Publicity Secretary of Democratic Action Party
59	Sanisvara Nethaji Rayer Rajaji	725	43	MP for Jelutong
93	Zairil Khir Johari	662	44	Penang State Executive Councillor; MLA for Tanjong Bunga; Assistant National Publicity Secretary of Democratic Action Party
01	Abdul Aziz Bari	648	45	MLA for Tebing Tinggi
18	Ean Yong Hian Wah	607	46	MLA for Seri Kembangan; Deputy Chairman of Democratic Action Party, Selangor
15	Chow Yu Hui	566	47	MLA for Tras
87	Wong May Ing	546	48	MLA for Pantai Remis
75	Tengku Zulpuri Shah Raja Puji	542	49	MP for Raub; National Vice-Chairman of Democratic Action Party
54	Ong Kian Ming	535	50	MP for Bangi; Assistant National Director of Political Education of Democratic Action Party
36	Lim Eng Guan	526	51	
57	Ramkarpal Singh Karpal Singh	497	52	MP for Bukit Gelugor
25	Kalidas Komarawelo	431	53	
67	Syahredzan Johan	428	54	
28	Kerk Chee Yee	388	55	MLA for Ayer Keroh
64	Sivanesan Achalingam	382	56	MLA for Sungkai
13	Chong Zhemin	364	57	MLA for Keranji
71	Nicole Tan Lee Koon	352	58	Negeri Sembilan State Executive Councillor; MLA for Bukit Kepayang
09	Charles Anthony Santiago	336	59	MP for Klang
22	Heng Lee Lee	332	60	MLA for Berapit
81	Tiew Way Keng	322	61	
60	Sheikh Umar Bagharib Ali	291	62	
45	Mary Josephine Pritam Singh	264	63	MLA for Rahang
51	Ng Wei Aik	262	64	
74	Eric Teh Hoong Keat	261	65	
73	Tee Boon Hock	231	66	
85	Wan Hamidi Hamid	226	67	
10	Chew Chong Sin	223	68	MLA for Mengkibol
26	Kamache A. Doray Rajoo	220	69	MLA for Sabai
32	Leow Thye Yih	208	70	MLA for Pokok Assam
16	David Marshel Pakianathan	176	71	
04	Apalasamy Jataliah	160	72	
44	Manogaran Marimuthu	130	73	Deputy Chairman of Democratic Action Party, Pahang
34	Liew Ah Kim	122	74	
17	Diccam Lourdes Lourdhusamy	117	75	
02	Abdul Aziz Isa Marindo	116	76	
84	Veerapan Superamaniam	113	77	Negeri Sembilan State Executive Councillor; MLA for Repah
48	Mordi Bimol	112	78	MP for Mas Gading
24	Jason Raj Kirupanantha	89	79	
33	Lew Chee Kwan	89	80	
78	Teoh Boon Kok	87	81	
62	Sinasamy Subramaniam	72	82	
72	Eric Tan Pok Shyong	71	83	
47	Mohan Ramasamy	68	84	
65	Soh Mei Lin	63	85	
58	Ravi Apalasamy	61	86	
82	Utaya Kumar Suppaya	60	87	
83	Valluvan Alagan	53	88	
46	Mohammad Basar Umar	36	89	
05			90	
06			91	
07			92	
39	Lim Kit Siang	Withdrew	93	8-term former and longest-serving Leader of the Opposition of Malaysia; MP for Iskandar Puteri; 11-term MP; 4-term former MLA; 1st Parliamentary Leader of Democratic Action Party; 2nd National Chairman of Democratic Action Party; 3rd Secretary-General of Democratic Action Party

==== Leadership ====
Party leadership changes following 2022 congress
Position	Outgoing	Successor	Cite
National Chairman	Tan Kok Wai	Lim Guan Eng	
National Deputy Chairman	Gobind Singh Deo		
National Vice-Chairmen	Chong Chieng Jen; Chow Kon Yeow; Kulasegaran Murugeson; Tengku Zulpuri Shah Raja Puji (co-opted); Stephen Wong Tien Fatt (co-opted)	Chong Chieng Jen; Chow Kon Yeow; Teresa Kok Suh Sim; Kulasegaran Murugeson; Nga Kor Ming	
Secretary-General	Lim Guan Eng	Anthony Loke Siew Fook	
Deputy Secretaries-General	Teresa Kok Suh Sim; Nga Kor Ming; Sivakumar Varatharaju Naidu	Liew Chin Tong; Tengku Zulpuri Shah Raja Puji (co-opted); Sivakumar Varatharaju Naidu (co-opted)	
National Treasurer: Assistant Treasurer	Fong Kui Lun: Ngeh Koo Ham	Fong Kui Lun: Ng Sze Han	
National Organising Secretary: Assistant Secretaries	Anthony Loke Siew Fook: Khoo Poay Tiong (co-opted); Thomas Su Keong Siong (co-opted)	Steven Sim Chee Keong: Ng Suee Lim; Khoo Poay Tiong (co-opted)	
National Publicity Secretary: Assistant Secretaries	Tony Pua Kiam Wee: Zairil Khir Johari; Yeo Bee Yin (co-opted)	Teo Nie Ching: Hannah Yeoh Tseow Suan; Ganabatirau Veraman (co-opted)	
International Secretary: Assistant Secretary	Teo Nie Ching: None	Jannie Lasimbang: Kasthuriraani Patto	
National Director of Political Education: Assistant Director	Liew Chin Tong: Ong Kian Ming (co-opted)	Wong Kah Woh: Wong Shu Qi	
Committee Members	Chong Eng; Ronnie Liu Tian Khiew; Teng Chang Khim; Jannie Lasimbang (co-opted); John Brian Anthony (co-opted); Wong Kah Woh (co-opted); Hannah Yeoh Tseow Suan (co-opted)	Chan Foong Hin; Alice Lau Kiong Yieng; Lim Hui Ying; Lim Lip Eng; Ronnie Liu Tian Khiew; Young Syefura Othman; Thomas Su Keong Siong; Tan Hong Pin; Tan Kok Wai; Teo Kok Seong; Vincent Wu Him Ven; Syahredzan Johan (co-opted)	
Parliamentary Leader	Lim Kit Siang	Nga Kor Ming	

== Notable speeches ==
=== Tan Kok Wai ===
DAP sentiasa memperingati perjuangan and pengorbanan pemimpin generasi terdahulu dan pada masa yang sama, terus memberikan ruang kepada generasi yang baru untuk memacu kemajuan parti untuk bergerak ke hadapan. Inilah punca utama kekuatan kita.

— Tan Kok Wai at the 2022 Democratic Action Party National Congress

Tan Kok Wai, as incumbent national chairman of the DAP, delivered his speech first to open the congress as per Clause IX Section 3 of the party constitution.

Tan's speech was focused on both the importance of a mature political culture whilst championing women's rights and anti-corruption. He discussed how the party is empowering women and standing by one of its core principle of equal rights for all races. He touted the DAP's stance on not cooperating with the "perasuah, pengkhianat, penyangak, dan juga katak politik" (corrupt, traitors, rogues, and also "political frogs").

Tan also recounted the personal disappointment of the collapse of the elected government in the aftermath of the 2020 Malaysian political crisis in the hands of the "rejim yang korup" (corrupt regime) who have since shown a lack of capability in administering the nation.

=== Lim Guan Eng ===
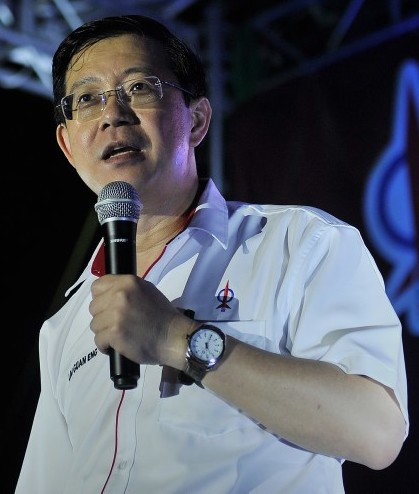

Malaysia dimiliki oleh semua rakyat, tanpa kira umur, jantina, kaum, agama, dan latar belakang. Tidak kira dari Semenanjung Malaysia, Sabah, Sarawak, ataupun sama ada mereka berbangsa Melayu, Cina, India, Orang Asli, Kadazandusun Murut, ataupun Iban Dayak. Tidak sepatutnya berlaku diskrimasi ataupun peminggiran dalam aspek politik, sosial dan ekonomi. Semua rakyat Malaysia seharusnya dopat tempat bersama di bawah naungan negara Malaysia.

— Lim Guan Eng at the 2022 Democratic Action Party National Congress

Lim Guan Eng, the fifth and outgoing secretary-general of the DAP, delivered his speech following the conclusion of Tan's speech.

Lim's speech was focused on secularism and equal rights for all citizens. He discussed how extremism and corruption even during the ongoing COVID-19 pandemic had impacted the economy and led to "various threats". He touted the DAP's success, under his stewardship, in transforming Penang into a leading state in Malaysia within ten years and the regret that they were not accorded the same luxury to do the same for the country as a whole.

Lim also recounted the DAP's past resilience from when he first took office as party secretary-general in September 2004 in its dream to create a better country for all Malaysians in the face of multiple recent state election defeats.

=== Lim Kit Siang ===
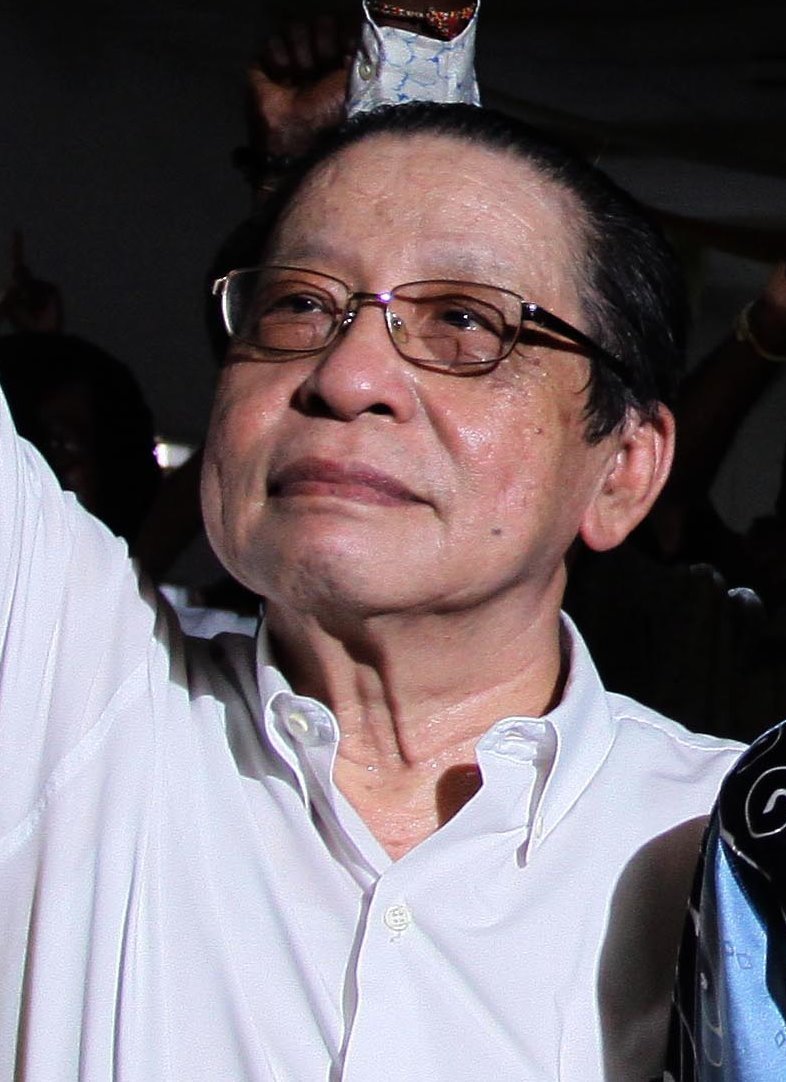

为实现马来西亚萌的斗争，我们必须。。。，而这个事业就交给你们了。谢谢各位。

— Lim Kit Siang at the 2022 Democratic Action Party National Congress

Lim Kit Siang, the senior member of the DAP, was given an opportunity to give a speech after his son, Guan Eng, announced the elder Lim's retirement from active politics after fifty-six years. In that span, Lim was party secretary-general for thirty years and subsequently became the longest-serving Malaysian Parliamentary Opposition Leader during part of his eleven terms as MP.

Lim's speech was focused on the party's struggle and mission. He urged the party members to continue fighting in line with the party's vision and hope for the country.

== Aftermath ==
Following Lim Kit Siang's decision to retire from active politics, he was given the figurehead position as party mentor whilst outgoing national chairman Tan Kok Wai was named advisor. Rais Yatim, 18th President of the Dewan Negara, remarked that the government should pay tribute to Lim having served over half a century in the nation's political arena.

After news broke that both Lim and Anwar Ibrahim, who was in attendance as People's Justice Party (PKR) president, tested positive for COVID-19, convicted former prime minister Najib Razak remarked on his personal Facebook page why Lim was not fined for hugging attendees. This triggered a response by health minister Khairy Jamaluddin, also on Facebook, that Lim has indeed been issued a RM1,000 compound but also questioned as to why Najib himself has yet to pay an outstanding four fines himself and that his officers has refused to accept them.

In the aftermath of the vote, Damansara MP and former corporate man Tony Pua Kiam Wee, who was a key figure in exposing the 1MDB scandal and also pro bono political secretary to Lim Guan Eng during his tenure as finance minister, expressed his surprise in not retaining a position in the CEC despite the number of positions being increased from twenty to thirty. Newly-minted secretary-general Loke seemingly reassured Pua the following day, calling the latter a "very important asset" to the party.

On 23 March 2022, Dr. Boo Cheng Hau, former chairman of the DAP's Johor chapter, called for Lim to step down as party chairman until all of Lim's corruption cases have been resolved in court. Chow Kon Yeow, DAP national vice-chairman and Lim's successor as Penang chief minister, responded on 26 March 2022 that the party will not make any changes to Lim's position until the court has delivered its verdict on the latter's outstanding cases.

== See also ==
- Impact of the COVID-19 pandemic on politics
