= Siow Kim Leong =

Malaysian politician

Member of the Negeri Sembilan State Legislative Assembly for Lobak
- In office 5 May 2013 – 9 May 2018
- Preceded by: Anthony Loke Siew Fook (PR–DAP)
- Succeeded by: Chew Seh Yong (PH–DAP)
- Majority: 8,270 (2013)

Personal details
- Born: Siow Kim Leong
- Party: Democratic Action Party (DAP)
- Other political affiliations: Pakatan Rakyat (PR) (2008–2015); Pakatan Harapan (PH) (since 2015)
- Occupation: Politician

Siow Kim Leong is a Malaysian politician who served as Member of the Negeri Sembilan State Legislative Assembly (MLA) for Lobak from May 2013 to May 2018. He is a member of the Democratic Action Party (DAP), a component party of the Pakatan Harapan (PH) and formerly Pakatan Rakyat (PR) coalitions.

== Election results ==
Negeri Sembilan State Legislative Assembly
Year	Constituency	Candidate	Votes	Pct	Opponent(s)	Votes	Pct	Ballots cast	Majority	Turnout
2013	N11 Lobak	Siow Kim Leong (DAP)	11,880	76.69%	How Kok Yew (MCA)	3,610	23.31%	15,697	8,270	84.24%
