= Lee Chin Chen =

Malaysian politician

Yang Berhormat Tuan Lee Chin Chen MLA
- 李政贤

Deputy Speaker of the Pahang State Legislative Assembly
- Incumbent
- Assumed office 29 December 2022
- Monarch: Abdullah
- Menteri Besar: Wan Rosdy Wan Ismail
- Speaker: Mohd Sharkar Shamsudin
- Preceded by: Mohamed Jaafar
- Constituency: Bilut

State Leader of the Opposition of Pahang
- In office 2 July 2018 – 14 October 2022
- Monarchs: Ahmad Shah (2018–2019); Abdullah (2019–2022)
- Menteri Besar: Wan Rosdy Wan Ismail
- Preceded by: Tengku Zulpuri Shah Raja Puji
- Succeeded by: Tuan Ibrahim Tuan Man
- Constituency: Bilut

Assistant National Organising Secretary of the Democratic Action Party
- Incumbent
- Assumed office 16 March 2025 Serving with Tan Hong Pin
- Secretary-General: Anthony Loke Siew Fook
- National Organising Secretary: Khoo Poay Tiong
- Preceded by: Khoo Poay Tiong

State Chairman of the Democratic Action Party of Pahang
- Incumbent
- Assumed office 1 September 2024
- Deputy: Manogaran Marimuthu
- Secretary-General: Anthony Loke Siew Fook
- Preceded by: Leong Ngah Ngah

Member of the Pahang State Legislative Assembly for Bilut
- Incumbent
- Assumed office 9 May 2018
- Preceded by: Chow Yu Hui (PR–DAP)
- Majority: 3,739 (2018); 3,111 (2022)

Member of the Pahang State Legislative Assembly for Ketari
- In office 5 May 2013 – 9 May 2018
- Preceded by: Ng Keong Chye (BN–GERAKAN)
- Succeeded by: Young Syefura Othman (PH–DAP)
- Majority: 2,140 (2013)

Personal details
- Born: Lee Chin Chen; 7 February 1984 (age 42) Pahang, Malaysia
- Citizenship: Malaysian
- Party: Democratic Action Party (DAP)
- Other political affiliations: Pakatan Rakyat (PR) (2008–2015); Pakatan Harapan (PH) (since 2015)
- Education: New Era University College (Media Studies); Chinese Culture University (Mass Communication); National Taiwan University (Master of Political Science)
- Occupation: Politician

Lee Chin Chen

Chinese name
- Traditional Chinese: 李政賢
- Simplified Chinese: 李政贤
Transcriptions
Standard Mandarin
- Hanyu Pinyin: Lǐ Zhèngxián

Lee Chin Chen (simplified Chinese: 李政贤; traditional Chinese: 李政賢; pinyin: Lǐ Zhèngxián; born 7 February 1984) is a Malaysian politician who has served as the Deputy Speaker of the Pahang State Legislative Assembly since December 2022 and Member of the Pahang State Legislative Assembly (MLA) for Bilut since May 2018. He served as the State Leader of the Opposition of Pahang from July 2018 to October 2022 and the MLA for Ketari from May 2013 to May 2018. He is a member of the Democratic Action Party (DAP), a component party of the Pakatan Harapan (PH) and formerly Pakatan Rakyat (PR) coalitions. He has also served as the Assistant National Organising Secretary of DAP since March 2025 and State Chairman of DAP of Pahang since September 2024. He is the first Deputy Speaker of non-Malay ethnicity in the history of Pahang.

== Controversies and issues ==
In February 2023, a photo of Lee committing a traffic offence went viral on social media. The photo showed Lee's car violating a "No Entry" sign. Lee issued a statement that he was cooperating with the police investigation, and had received a summons which he would pay. The Bentong District Police Chief issued a statement confirming that a summons had been issued under Section 79(2) of the Road Transport Act (RTD) 1987.

== Election results ==
Pahang State Legislative Assembly
Year	Constituency	Candidate	Votes	Pct	Opponent(s)	Votes	Pct	Ballots cast	Majority	Turnout
2013	N34 Ketari	Lee Chin Chen (DAP)	10,050	55.96%	Woong Choo Yak (MCA)	7,910	44.04%	18,276	2,140	84.30%
2018	N33 Bilut	Lee Chin Chen (DAP)	8,798	55.68%	Poo Mun Hoong (MCA)	5,059	32.02%	16,049	3,739	84.02%
2018	N33 Bilut	Lee Chin Chen (DAP)	8,798	55.68%	Mohd Zamri Nong (PAS)	1,944	12.30%	16,049	3,739	84.02%
2022	N33 Bilut	Lee Chin Chen (DAP)	8,895	47.56%	Wong Siew Mun (MCA)	5,784	30.93%	18,929	3,111	77.94%
2022	N33 Bilut	Lee Chin Chen (DAP)	8,895	47.56%	Chandra Baladedha (GERAKAN)	3,363	17.98%	18,929	3,111	77.94%
2022	N33 Bilut	Lee Chin Chen (DAP)	8,895	47.56%	Mohd Shokri Mahmood (PEJUANG)	433	2.32%	18,929	3,111	77.94%
