= Ariff Sabri Abdul Aziz =

Malaysian politician and blogger

Yang Berbahagia Dato' Mohamad Ariff Sabri Abdul Aziz DIMP
- محمد عارف صبري بن عبد العزيز

Member of the Malaysian Parliament for Raub
- In office 5 May 2013 – 9 May 2018
- Preceded by: Ng Yen Yen (BN–MCA)
- Succeeded by: Tengku Zulpuri Shah Raja Puji (PH–DAP)
- Majority: 2,814

Member of the Pahang State Legislative Assembly for Pulau Manis
- In office 21 March 2004 – 8 March 2008
- Preceded by: New constituency
- Succeeded by: Khairuddin Mahmud (BN–UMNO)
- Majority: 4,491

Personal details
- Born: 1956 (age 69–70) Kampung Parit, Pekan, Pahang, Federation of Malaya (now Malaysia)
- Party: Democratic Action Party (DAP) (2012–); United Malay National Organization (UMNO) (until 2012)
- Education: University of Malaya; University of Manchester (Owens)
- Occupation: Politician, Blogger
- Known for: Blogger name of Sakmongkol AK47
- Website: Blog

Mohamad Ariff Sabri bin Abdul Aziz (Jawi: محمد عارف صبري بن عبد العزيز), commonly known by his blogger name of Sakmongkol AK47, is a Malaysian politician and prominent blogger.

== Career ==
He is a member of Democratic Action Party (DAP), a component of Pakatan Harapan (PH) coalition. He was the Member of Parliament of Raub in Pahang for one term from 2013 to 2018.

Ariff Sabri was a member of United Malay National Organization (UMNO) until 2012 and served as the Pekan UMNO chief of information under Dato' Seri Najib Razak from 2000 to 2004 formerly. He was also the former Pahang assemblyman for Pulau Manis from 2004 to 2008 then.

In early 2012, he and another prominent blogger, Aspan Alias left UMNO and joined the DAP, citing UMNO's failure to eradicate corruption and increase the livelihood of Malays in general. He won the Pahang parliamentary seat of Raub under the DAP ticket in the 2013 general election.

He suffered a stroke in 2018 and did not seek a second term reelection for his Raub parliamentary seat in the 2018 general election.

== Personal life ==
Ariff Sabri graduated with a degree on economics from the University of Malaya and University of Manchester (Owens).

== Election results ==
Pahang State Legislative Assembly
Year	Constituency	Candidate	Votes	Pct	Opponent(s)	Votes	Pct	Ballots cast	Majority	Turnout
2004	N20 Pulau Manis	Ariff Sabri Abdul Aziz (UMNO)	7,153	66.27%	Mohd Fadzil Malek (PAS)	2,662	24.66%	10,794	4,491	80.98%

Parliament of Malaysia
Year	Constituency	Candidate	Votes	Pct	Opponent(s)	Votes	Pct	Ballots cast	Majority	Turnout
2013	P080 Raub	Ariff Sabri Abdul Aziz (DAP)	23,415	51.96%	Hoh Khai Mun (MCA)	20,601	45.72%	45,060	2,814	83.10%

== Honours ==
- Pahang
  - Knight Companion of the Order of the Crown of Pahang (DIMP) – Dato' (2008)
