= Chong Sin Woon =

Malaysian politician

Yang Berbahagia Datuk Chong Sin Woon DPSM
- 张盛闻
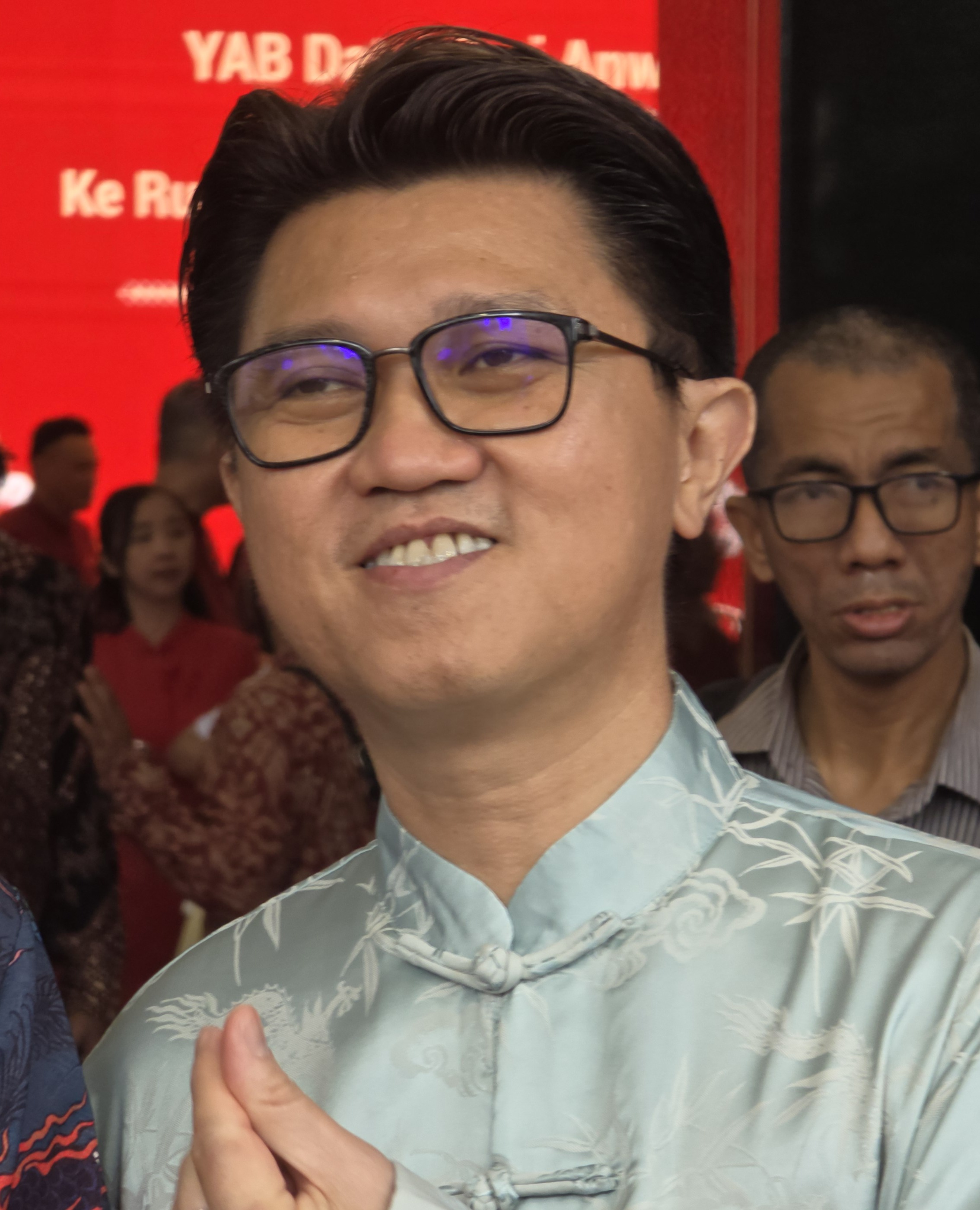
- Chong in 2026

Deputy Minister of Education II
- In office 29 July 2015 – 9 May 2018
- Monarchs: Abdul Halim (2015–2016); Muhammad V (2016–2018)
- Prime Minister: Najib Razak
- Minister: Mahdzir Khalid
- Preceded by: Mary Yap
- Succeeded by: Teo Nie Ching (Deputy Minister of Education)
- Constituency: Senator

Senator Elected by the Negeri Sembilan State Legislative Assembly
- In office 21 April 2014 – 28 April 2018 Serving with Salim Shariff
- Monarchs: Abdul Halim (2014–2016); Muhammad V (2016–2018)
- Prime Minister: Najib Razak
- Preceded by: Yeow Chai Thiam
- Succeeded by: Kesavadas Achyuthan Nair

Secretary-General of the Malaysian Chinese Association
- Incumbent
- Assumed office 26 September 2019
- President: Wee Ka Siong
- Deputy: Chai Kim Sen (2019–2021); Pamela Yong (since 2021)
- Preceded by: Chew Mei Fun

Youth Chief of the Malaysian Chinese Association
- In office 20 December 2013 – 4 November 2018
- President: Liow Tiong Lai
- Deputy: Chris Lee Ching Yong
- Preceded by: Wee Ka Siong
- Succeeded by: Nicole Wong Siaw Ting

Chairman of the Port Klang Authority
- In office 28 April 2020 – 14 December 2022
- Minister: Wee Ka Siong
- General manager: Subramaniam Karuppiah
- Preceded by: Ean Yong Hian Wah
- Succeeded by: Ean Yong Hian Wah

Personal details
- Born: Chong Sin Woon; 25 December 1973 (age 52) Nilai, Negeri Sembilan, Malaysia
- Citizenship: Malaysian
- Party: Malaysian Chinese Association (MCA)
- Other political affiliations: Barisan Nasional (BN)
- Spouse: Chai Yoke Shyuan
- Children: 2
- Education: National University of Malaysia
- Occupation: Politician

Chong Sin Woon (simplified Chinese: 张盛闻; traditional Chinese: 張盛聞; Pe̍h-ōe-jī: Tioⁿ Sēng-bûn; born 25 December 1973) is a Malaysian politician who served as the Deputy Minister of Education II from a Cabinet reshuffle in July 2015 to the collapse of the Barisan Nasional (BN) administration in May 2018. He served as a Senator from April 2014 to April 2017 for the first term and reappointed to serve from April 2017 to April 2020 for the second term until his resignation in April 2018 to contest in the 2018 General Election. He is a member of the Malaysian Chinese Association (MCA), a major component party of the BN coalition as well as its Secretary-General since September 2019 after the resignation of his predecessor Chew Mei Fun.

== Early life ==
Chong was born in Negeri Sembilan to Chong Fatt Yuen and Leaw Moi. His parents were rubber tappers. Chong is the youngest among seven siblings. As a child, Chong delivered newspapers to supplement his family's income. He attended SJKC Kuo Min and he went on to spend eight years in SM Dato Mohd Said in Nilai, Negeri Sembilan. Chong graduated with a bachelor's degree in economics from National University of Malaysia in 1999.

== Political career ==
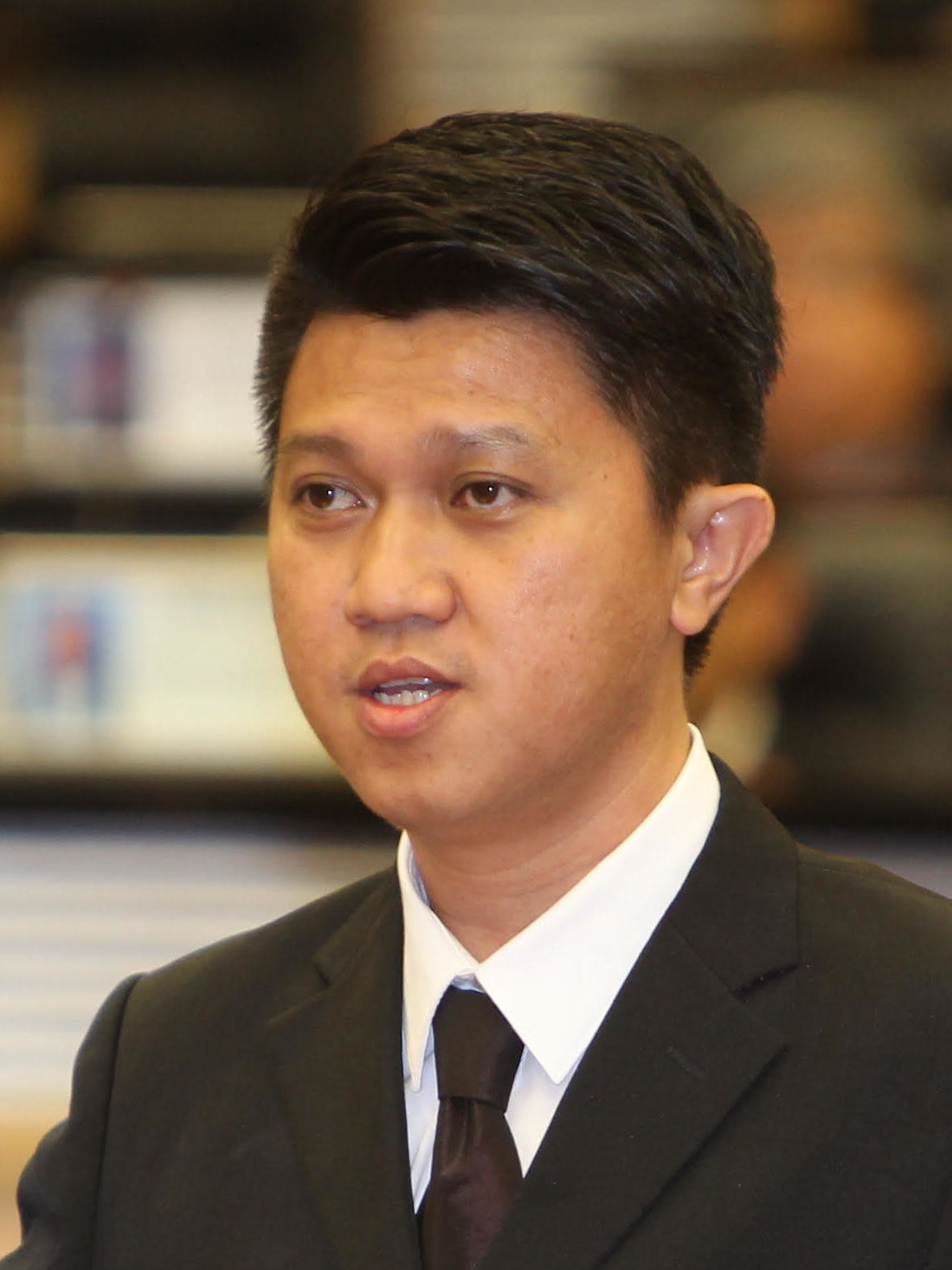
Chong in 2014

Upon his graduation in 1999, Chong joined MCA in 2001. He won the MCA Youth Chief's post in 2013 and appointed as a Senator in 2014. In 2015 he was appointed as Deputy Minister of Education II by the then-prime minister, Najib Razak in a Cabinet reshuffle. Chong was reappointed as Senator in 2017.

In 2018 Malaysian general election, Chong contested for the Seremban federal seat against the opposition Democratic Action Party (DAP) National Organising Secretary Anthony Loke and was defeated. Chong and his MCA Youth concedes defeat and is ready to position itself as the opposition to "keep an eye" on the new Pakatan Harapan (PH) administration in 2018. In September 2019, Chew Mei Fun resigned as the Secretary-General of MCA and Chong was appointed to take over the position and has served since then. However, 21 months later in February 2020, PH collapsed due to party-hopping and was replaced with Perikatan Nasional (PN) administration led by Prime Minister and President of the Malaysian United Indigenous Party (BERSATU) Muhyiddin Yassin in March 2020. MCA, which is in BN, is aligned with PN and hence he was appointed Chairman of the Port Klang Authority by the PN administration in April 2020.

== Controversy ==
On 5 November 2017, Chong has apologised for his insensitive 'tokong' or 'deity-like' remarks and jibe he had made over Penang Chief Minister Lim Guan Eng in his speech during the 64th MCA general assembly amid Penang's devastating floods situation.

== Election results ==
Parliament of Malaysia
Year	Constituency	Candidate	Votes	Pct	Opponent(s)	Votes	Pct	Ballots cast	Majority	Turnout
2018	P128 Seremban	Chong Sin Woon (MCA)	24,809	27.02%	Loke Siew Fook (DAP)	55,503	60.45%	93,254	30,694	84.65%
2018	P128 Seremban	Chong Sin Woon (MCA)	24,809	27.02%	Shariffuddin Ahmad (PAS)	11,506	12.53%	93,254	30,694	84.65%
2022	P080 Raub	Chong Sin Woon (MCA)	16,939	30.12%	Chow Yu Hui (DAP)	21,613	38.43%	56,235	4,357	74.92%
2022	P080 Raub	Chong Sin Woon (MCA)	16,939	30.12%	Fakrunizam Ibrahim (BERSATU)	17,256	30.69%	56,235	4,357	74.92%
2022	P080 Raub	Chong Sin Woon (MCA)	16,939	30.12%	Norkhairul Anuar Mohamed Nor (PEJUANG)	427	0.76%	56,235	4,357	74.92%

== Honours ==
- Malacca
  - Companion Class II of the Exalted Order of Malacca (DPSM) – Datuk (2016)

== See also ==
- Seremban (federal constituency)
