= Chew Seh Yong =

Malaysian politician

Yang Berhormat Tuan Chew Seh Yong MLA
- 周世扬

Member of the Negeri Sembilan State Executive Council (Human Resources, Plantations and Non-Islamic Affairs)
- In office 10 February 2023 – 14 August 2023
- Monarch: Muhriz
- Menteri Besar: Aminuddin Harun
- Preceded by: Arul Kumar Jambunathan
- Succeeded by: Jalaluddin Alias (Senior Member, Plantations); Veerapan Superamaniam (Human Resources); Teo Kok Seong (Non-Islamic Affairs)
- Constituency: Lobak

Member of the Negeri Sembilan State Legislative Assembly for Lobak
- Incumbent
- Assumed office 9 May 2018
- Preceded by: Siow Kim Leong (PR–DAP)
- Majority: 11,782 (2018); 13,504 (2023); 11,053 (2026)

Member of the Negeri Sembilan State Legislative Assembly for Bahau
- In office 5 May 2013 – 9 May 2018
- Preceded by: Teo Kok Seong (PR–DAP)
- Succeeded by: Teo Kok Seong (PH–DAP)
- Majority: 5,136 (2013)

Personal details
- Born: Chew Seh Yong; 3 February 1962 (age 64) Malaysia
- Party: Democratic Action Party (DAP)
- Other political affiliations: Pakatan Rakyat (PR) (2008–2015); Pakatan Harapan (PH) (since 2015)
- Occupation: Politician

Chew Seh Yong (born 3 February 1962) is a Malaysian politician who has served as Member of the Negeri Sembilan State Legislative Assembly (MLA) for Lobak since May 2018. He served as Member of the Negeri Sembilan State Executive Council (EXCO) in the Pakatan Harapan (PH) state administration under Menteri Besar Aminuddin Harun from February to August 2023 and MLA for Bahau from May 2013 to May 2018. He is a member of the Democratic Action Party (DAP), a component party of the PH and formerly Pakatan Rakyat (PR) coalition. He is also the shortest-serving Negeri Sembilan EXCO Member in the recent history of the state, in office for slightly more than just 6 months.

== Election results ==
Negeri Sembilan State Legislative Assembly
Year	Constituency	Candidate	Votes	Pct	Opponent(s)	Votes	Pct	Ballots cast	Majority	Turnout
2013	N08 Bahau	Chew Seh Yong (DAP)	9,998	67.28%	Yee Mee Faa (MCA)	4,862	32.72%	15,148	5,136	82.13%
2018	N11 Lobak	Chew Seh Yong (DAP)	13,647	87.46%	Lim Kok Kian (MCA)	1,865	11.95%	15,795	11,782	82.70%
2018	N11 Lobak	Chew Seh Yong (DAP)	13,647	87.46%	Balamurugan Sanmugam (PAP)	92	0.59%	15,795	11,782	82.70%
2023	N11 Lobak	Chew Seh Yong (DAP)	14,357	94.39%	Ng Soon Lean (GERAKAN)	853	5.61%	15,321	13,504	66.06%
2026	N11 Lobak	Chew Seh Yong (DAP)	13,064	86.65%	Kumar Paramasivam (PAS)	2,011	13.34%	15,075	11,053	65.32%
