= Hoh Khai Mun =

Malaysian politician

Yang Berbahagia Dato' Sri Hoh Khai Mun SSAP SIMP DSAP DIMP
- 何启文

Exco roles (Pahang)
- 2008–2013: Chairman of the Local Government, Health and Environment

Faction represented in Dewan Negara
- 2015–2018: Barisan Nasional

Faction represented in Pahang State Legislative Assembly
- 1995–2013: Barisan Nasional

Personal details
- Born: 8 August 1955 (age 71) Bentong, Pahang, Federation of Malaya (now Malaysia)
- Party: Malaysian Chinese Association (MCA)
- Other political affiliations: Barisan Nasional (BN)
- Education: University of Malaya
- Occupation: Politician
- Known for: Former Health, Local Government and Environment Committee Chairman (Exco) for Pahang.
- Website: Facebook

Chinese name
- Traditional Chinese: 何啟文
- Simplified Chinese: 何启文
- Hanyu Pinyin: Hé Qǐwén
- Yale Romanization: Hòh Káimàhn

Hoh Khai Mun (Chinese: 何启文; pinyin: Hé Qǐwén); born 8 August 1955, is a Malaysian politician and was a senator elected by Pahang State Assembly in senator for the 29 May 2015 - 28 May 2018 term.

Hoh is the former state executive council (Exco) member of Pahang who is in charge with local council, health, and the environment. He is the former Pahang state assemblyman of Bilut seat for four terms from 1995 to 2013 before he switched to contest the federal seat of Raub and lost in the 2013 general election. Hoh is also the Malaysian Chinese Association (MCA) party Pahang state chairman and Bentong division chairman.

== Early life ==
Hoh hails from Bentong, Pahang, Malaysia. He studied at Sekolah Menengah Katholik and went to University of Malaya later.

== Election results ==
Pahang State Legislative Assembly
Year	Constituency	Candidate	Votes	Pct	Opponent(s)	Votes	Pct	Ballots cast	Majority	Turnout
1995	N28 Bilut	Hoh Khai Mun (MCA)	6,979	63.45%	Leong Chee Meng (DAP)	3,052	27.75%	10,999	3,927	72.93%
1999	N28 Bilut	Hoh Khai Mun (MCA)	6,207	54.57%	Soon Sau Choong (DAP)	4,311	37.90%	11,374	1,896	74.16%
2004	N33 Bilut	Hoh Khai Mun (MCA)	7,666	68.73%	Tam Tai San (DAP)	3,058	27.42%	11,154	4,608	73.33%
2008	N33 Bilut	Hoh Khai Mun (MCA)	6,024	53.04%	Tam Tai San (DAP)	4,916	43.29%	11,357	1,108	73.79%

Parliament of Malaysia
Year	Constituency	Candidate	Votes	Pct	Opponent(s)	Votes	Pct	Ballots cast	Majority	Turnout
2013	P080 Raub	Hoh Khai Mun (MCA)	20,601	45.72%	Ariff Sabri Abdul Aziz (DAP)	23,415	51.96%	45,060	2,814	83.10%

== Honours ==
- Pahang
  - Grand Knight of the Order of Sultan Ahmad Shah of Pahang (SSAP) – Dato' Sri (2018)
  - Grand Knight of the Order of the Crown of Pahang (SIMP) – formerly Dato', now Dato' Indera (2012)
  - Knight Companion of the Order of Sultan Ahmad Shah of Pahang (DSAP) – Dato' (2007)
  - Knight Companion of the Order of the Crown of Pahang (DIMP) – Dato' (2003)
