= Raub (federal constituency) =

Federal constituency of Pahang, Malaysia

Raub (P080)
Pahang constituency

Federal constituency
- Legislature: Dewan Rakyat
- MP: Chow Yu Hui; PH
- Constituency created: 1958
- First contested: 1959
- Last contested: 2022

Demographics
- Population (2020): 95,909
- Electors (2022): 75,064
- Area (km²): 2,296
- Pop. density (per km²): 41.8

Raub is a federal constituency in Raub District, Pahang, Malaysia, that has been represented in the Dewan Rakyat since 1959.

The federal constituency was created in the 1958 redistribution and is mandated to return a single member to the Dewan Rakyat under the first past the post voting system.

== Demographics ==
https://live.chinapress.com.my/ge15/parliament/PAHANG

Ethnic breakdown of Raub's electorate as of 2022
1. Malay (53.6%)
2. Chinese (36.6%)
3. Indian (7.20%)
4. Other ethnicities (2.60%)

As of 2020, Raub has a population of 95,909 people.

Age breakdown of Raub's electorate as of 2022
1. 18-20 (5.27%)
2. 21-29 (19.2%)
3. 30-39 (23.1%)
4. 40-49 (16.6%)
5. 50-59 (14.6%)
6. 60-69 (12.2%)
7. 70-79 (6.34%)
8. 80-89 (2.28%)
9. above 90 (0.41%)
Gender breakdown of Raub's electorate as of 2022
1. Male (50.7%)
2. Female (49.3%)

== History ==
=== Polling districts ===
According to the federal gazette issued on 31 October 2022, the Raub constituency is divided into 39 polling districts.

State constituency	Polling district	Code	Location
Batu Talam (N06)	Hulu Atok	080/06/01	SK Ulu Atok
Batu Talam (N06)	Atok	080/06/02	SK Kuala Atok
Batu Talam (N06)	Sega	080/06/03	SK Sega
Batu Talam (N06)	Chenua	080/06/04	SK Chenua
Batu Talam (N06)	Kundang Patah	080/06/05	SK Kundang Patah
Batu Talam (N06)	Cheroh	080/06/06	SJK (C) Cheroh
Batu Talam (N06)	Hulu Sungai	080/06/07	SK Ulu Sungai
Batu Talam (N06)	FELDA Tersang Tiga	080/06/08	SK (LKTP) Tersang 3
Batu Talam (N06)	FELDA Tersang Dua	080/06/09	SMK (LKTP) Tersang
Batu Talam (N06)	FELDA Tersang Satu	080/06/10	SK LKTP Tersang 1
Batu Talam (N06)	Batu Malim	080/06/11	Balai Raya Batu Malim
Batu Talam (N06)	Batu Talam	080/06/12	SMA Al-Falah
Tras (N07)	Sungai Ruan	080/07/01	SJK (C) Sungai Ruan; SMK Sungai Ruan
Tras (N07)	Hulu Gali	080/07/02	SK Ulu Gali
Tras (N07)	Pintu Padang	080/07/03	SM Sains Tengku Abdullah
Tras (N07)	Kampung Sempalit	080/07/04	Balai Raya Kampung Baru Sempalit
Tras (N07)	Kampung Baru Sempalit	080/07/05	SJK (C) Sempalit
Tras (N07)	Simpang Kallang	080/07/06	SMK Seri Raub
Tras (N07)	Kampung Melayu	080/07/07	SMK Dato Shah Bandar Hussain
Tras (N07)	Bukit Koman	080/07/08	SJK (C) Yuh Hwa
Tras (N07)	Sungai Lui	080/07/09	SJK (C) Sungai Lui; Tadika Sungai Lui
Tras (N07)	Taman Sentosa	080/07/10	SK Mahmud
Tras (N07)	Bandar Raub	080/07/11	SMJK Chung Ching
Tras (N07)	Raub Jaya	080/07/12	SMK Mahmud
Tras (N07)	Pekan Tras	080/07/13	SJK (C) Tras
Tras (N07)	Bukit Fraser	080/07/14	Pejabat Perbadanan Kemajuan Bukit Fraser
Tras (N07)	Sungai Chetang	080/07/15	SJK (C) Sungai Chetang
Tras (N07)	Kampung Sang Lee	080/07/16	SJK (C) Sang Lee
Dong (N08)	Pamah Rawas	080/08/01	SK Ulu Dong
Dong (N08)	Pamah Kulat	080/08/02	SK Pamah Kulat
Dong (N08)	Jeram	080/08/03	SJK (C) Sungak Klau
Dong (N08)	FELDA Lembah Klau	080/08/04	SK LKTP Lembah Klau
Dong (N08)	FELDA Krau	080/08/05	SK LKTP Krau 1
Dong (N08)	Gali Tengah	080/08/06	SK Gali
Dong (N08)	Gali Hilir	080/08/07	Dewan Serbaguna Kampung Gali Hilir
Dong (N08)	Durian Sebatang	080/08/08	Balai Raya Durian Sebatang
Dong (N08)	Kampung Temau	080/08/09	SK Temau
Dong (N08)	Pekan Dong	080/08/10	SMK Dong
Dong (N08)	Tanjung Putus	080/08/11	SK Tanjung Putus

=== Representation history ===
Members of Parliament for Raub
Parliament	No	Years	Member	Party	Vote Share
Constituency created from Ulu Pahang
Parliament of the Federation of Malaya
1st	P059	1959–1963	Hussein Hassan (حسين حسن)	Alliance (UMNO)	6,764; 56.87%
Parliament of Malaysia
1st	P059	1963–1964	Hussein Hassan (حسين حسن)	Alliance (UMNO)	6,764; 56.87%
2nd	P059	1964–1967	Hussein Hassan (حسين حسن)	Alliance (UMNO)	11,332; 69.40%
2nd	P059	1967–1969	Hamzah Abu Samah (حمزه ابو سمح)	Alliance (UMNO)	Uncontested
		1969–1971	Parliament was suspended		
3rd	P059	1971–1973	Hamzah Abu Samah (حمزه ابو سمح)	Alliance (UMNO)	Uncontested
3rd	P059	1973–1974	Hamzah Abu Samah (حمزه ابو سمح)	BN (UMNO)	Uncontested
4th	P068	1974–1978	Abdullah Majid (عبدالله مجيد)	BN (UMNO)	11,036; 64.80%
5th	P068	1978–1982	Tan Koon Swan (陈群川)	BN (MCA)	11,411; 56.16%
6th	P068	1982–1986	Tan Tiong Hong (陈忠鸿)	BN (MCA)	12,287; 53.03%
7th	P073	1986–1990	Teng Gaik Kwan (邓育桓)	BN (MCA)	18,034; 55.77%
8th	P073	1990–1995	Teng Gaik Kwan (邓育桓)	BN (MCA)	20,237; 61.53%
9th	P076	1995–1999	Teng Gaik Kwan (邓育桓)	BN (MCA)	23,065; 66.47%
10th	P076	1999–2004	Ng Yen Yen (黄燕燕)	BN (MCA)	20,457; 58.37%
11th	P080	2004–2008	Ng Yen Yen (黄燕燕)	BN (MCA)	20,472; 65.63%
12th	P080	2008–2013	Ng Yen Yen (黄燕燕)	BN (MCA)	18,078; 54.12%
13th	P080	2013–2015	Mohd Ariff Sabri Abdul Aziz (محمد عارف صبري بن عبد العزيز)	PR (DAP)	23,415; 53.20%
13th	P080	2015–2018	Mohd Ariff Sabri Abdul Aziz (محمد عارف صبري بن عبد العزيز)	PH (DAP)	23,415; 53.20%
14th	P080	2018–2022	Tengku Zulpuri Shah Raja Puji (تڠكو ذوالڤوري شاه بن راج ڤوجي)	PH (DAP)	20,659; 44.89%
15th	P080	2022–present	Chow Yu Hui (邹宇晖)	PH (DAP)	21,613; 38.43%

=== State constituency ===
Parliamentary constituency	State constituency						
Parliamentary constituency	1955–59*	1959–1974	1974–1986	1986–1995	1995–2004	2004–2018	2018–present
Raub		Bandar Raub					
Raub			Batu Talam				
Raub				Benta			
Raub		Cameron Highlands					
Raub		Dong					
Raub				Teras			
Raub		Tras				Tras	

=== Historical boundaries ===
State Constituency	Area					
State Constituency	1959	1974	1984	1994	2003	2018
Bandar Raub	Raub; Taman Intan; Taman Lee Man; Taman Maju Indah; Taman Makmur	Bukit Fraser; Kampung Baru Sang Lee; Kampung Baru Sungai Chetang; Sempalit; Tras				
Batu Talam		Batu Malim; Batu Talam; Cheroh; Gesing; Kampung Sega Tat				
Benta			Benta; Jeransang; Kampung Lalang; Kemahang; Tanjung Besar	Benta; Jeransang; Kampung Penjom; Kemahang; Tanjung Besar		
Cameron Highlands	Brinchang; Kampung Raja; Kuala Terla; Ringlet; Tringkap					
Dong	Cheroh; Dong; FELDA Krau; Kampung Jeruas; Kampung Temau	Dong; FELDA Krau; Kampung Gali; Kampung Temau; Sempalit		Dong; FELDA Lembah Klau; Kampung Gali; Kampung Temau; Sungai Ruan	FELDA Krau; FELDA Lembah Klau; Kampung Gali; Kampung Temau; Sungai Ruan	Dong; FELDA Krau; FELDA Lembah Klau; Kampung Gali; Kampung Temau
Tras	Bukit Fraser; Kampung Gali; Sempalit; Sungai Ruan; Tras		Bukit Fraser; Kampung Baru Sang Lee; Kampung Baru Sungai Chetang; Raub; Teranum	FELDA Krau; Kampung Baru Sang Lee; Raub; Sempalit; Teranum	Bukit Fraser; Kampung Baru Sang Lee; Raub; Sempalit; Teranum	Kampung Baru Sang Lee; Raub; Sempalit; Sungai Ruan; Teranum

=== Current state assembly members ===
No.	State Constituency	Member	Coalition (Party)
N06	Batu Talam	Abdul Aziz Mat Kiram	BN (UMNO)
N07	Tras	Tengku Zulpuri Shah Raja Puji	PH (DAP)
N08	Dong	Fadzli Mohamad Kamal	BN (UMNO)

=== Local governments & postcodes ===
No.	State Constituency	Local Government	Postcode
N06	Batu Talam	Raub District Council	27300, 27310 Benta; 27400 Dong; 27600, 27610, 27620, 27630, 27670 Raub; 27660 Sega; 28700, 28800 Bentong; 49000 Bukit Fraser
N07	Tras	Raub District Council	27300, 27310 Benta; 27400 Dong; 27600, 27610, 27620, 27630, 27670 Raub; 27660 Sega; 28700, 28800 Bentong; 49000 Bukit Fraser
N08	Dong	Raub District Council	27300, 27310 Benta; 27400 Dong; 27600, 27610, 27620, 27630, 27670 Raub; 27660 Sega; 28700, 28800 Bentong; 49000 Bukit Fraser

== Election results ==
Malaysian general election, 2022
Party	Candidate	Votes	%	∆%
PH	Chow Yu Hui	21,613	38.43	▲38.43
PN	Fakrunizam Ibrahim	17,256	30.69	▲30.69
BN	Chong Sin Woon	16,939	30.12	▼7.90
GTA	Norkhairul Anuar Mohamed Nor	427	0.76	▲0.76
Total valid votes		56,235	100.00	
Total rejected ballots		733		
Unreturned ballots		120		
Turnout		57,088	74.92	▼6.45
Registered electors		75,064		
Majority		4,357	7.74	▲0.88
PH hold		Swing		
Source(s) https://lom.agc.gov.my/ilims/upload/portal/akta/outputp/1753278/PUB611_2022.pdf

Malaysian general election, 2018
Party	Candidate	Votes	%	∆%
PKR	Tengku Zulpuri Shah Raja Puji	20,659	44.89	▲44.89
BN	Chew Mei Fun	17,500	38.02	▼8.60
PAS	Mohamed Nilam Abdul Manap	7,866	17.09	▲17.09
Total valid votes		46,025	100.00	
Total rejected ballots		766		
Unreturned ballots		180		
Turnout		46,971	81.37	▼1.74
Registered electors		57,723		
Majority		3,159	6.86	▲0.46
PKR hold		Swing		
Source(s) "His Majesty's Government Gazette - Notice of Contested Election, Parliament for the State of Pahang [P.U. (B) 238/2018]" (PDF). Attorney General's Chambers of Malaysia. 3 May 2018. "Federal Government Gazette - Results of Contested Election and Statements of the Poll after the Official Addition of Votes, Parliamentary Constituencies for the State of Pahang [P.U. (B) 312/2018]" (PDF). Attorney General's Chambers of Malaysia. 28 May 2018.

Malaysian general election, 2013
Party	Candidate	Votes	%	∆%
DAP	Mohd Ariff Sabri Abdul Aziz	23,415	53.20	▲7.32
BN	Hoh Khai Mun	20,601	46.80	▼7.32
Total valid votes		44,016	100.00	
Total rejected ballots		927		
Unreturned ballots		116		
Turnout		45,059	83.11	▲8.93
Registered electors		54,214		
Majority		2,814	6.40	▼1.84
DAP gain from BN		Swing		?
Source(s) "Federal Government Gazette - Notice of Contested Election, Parliament for the State of Pahang [P.U. (B) 175/2013]" (PDF). Attorney General's Chambers of Malaysia. 26 April 2013. "Federal Government Gazette - Results of Contested Election and Statements of the Poll after the Official Addition of Votes, Parliamentary Constituencies for the State of Pahang [P.U. (B) 216/2013]" (PDF). Attorney General's Chambers of Malaysia. 22 May 2013. Archived from the original (PDF) on 2019-07-01.

Malaysian general election, 2008
Party	Candidate	Votes	%	∆%
BN	Oei Yang Yang @ Ng Yen Yen	18,078	54.12	▼11.51
DAP	Abu Bakar Lebai Sudin	15,326	45.88	▲11.51
Total valid votes		33,404	100.00	
Total rejected ballots		915		
Unreturned ballots		140		
Turnout		34,459	74.18	▲1.11
Registered electors		46,454		
Majority		2,752	8.24	▼23.03
BN hold		Swing		

Malaysian general election, 2004
Party	Candidate	Votes	%	∆%
BN	Oei Yang Yang @ Ng Yen Yen	20,472	65.63	▲7.26
DAP	Choong Siew Onn	10,720	34.37	▼7.26
Total valid votes		31,192	100.00	
Total rejected ballots		1,280		
Unreturned ballots		74		
Turnout		32,546	73.07	▲3.20
Registered electors		44,540		
Majority		9,752	31.26	▲14.52
BN hold		Swing		

Malaysian general election, 1999
Party	Candidate	Votes	%	∆%
BN	Oei Yang Yang @ Ng Yen Yen	20,457	58.37	▼8.10
DAP	Ng Kwi Ling	14,593	41.63	▲19.06
Total valid votes		35,050	100.00	
Total rejected ballots		1,278		
Unreturned ballots		278		
Turnout		36,606	69.87	▼1.97
Registered electors		52,391		
Majority		5,864	16.74	▼27.16
BN hold		Swing		

Malaysian general election, 1995
Party	Candidate	Votes	%	∆%
BN	Teng Ah Luan @ Teng Gaik Kwan	23,065	66.47	▲4.94
DAP	Ng Kwi Ling	7,833	22.57	▼15.90
Independent	Ibrahim Yusof	2,447	7.05	▲7.05
Independent	Sarif Udin	1,356	3.91	▲3.91
Total valid votes		34,701	100.00	
Total rejected ballots		1,796		
Unreturned ballots		469		
Turnout		36,966	71.84	▲0.07
Registered electors		51,456		
Majority		15,232	43.90	▲20.84
BN hold		Swing		

Malaysian general election, 1990
Party	Candidate	Votes	%	∆%
BN	Teng Ah Luan @ Teng Gaik Kwan	20,237	61.53	▲5.76
DAP	Lip Tuck Chee	12,655	38.47	▲5.93
Total valid votes		32,892	100.00	
Total rejected ballots		1,692		
Unreturned ballots		0		
Turnout		34,584	71.77	▼4.04
Registered electors		48,189		
Majority		7,582	23.06	▼0.17
BN hold		Swing		

Malaysian general election, 1986
Party	Candidate	Votes	%	∆%
BN	Teng Ah Luan @ Teng Gaik Kwan	18,034	55.77	▲2.74
DAP	Cheah Kam Chiew	10,521	32.54	▲8.37
PAS	Tengku Puji Tengku Abdul Hamid	3,780	11.69	▼2.04
Total valid votes		32,335	100.00	
Total rejected ballots		796		
Unreturned ballots		0		
Turnout		33,131	75.81	▼0.78
Registered electors		43,705		
Majority		7,513	23.23	▼5.63
BN hold		Swing		

Malaysian general election, 1982
Party	Candidate	Votes	%	∆%
BN	Tan Tiong Hong	12,287	53.03	▼3.13
DAP	Lip Ah Kow @ Lip Tuck Chee	5,600	24.17	▼2.64
PAS	Tengku Puji Tengku Abdul Hamid	3,182	13.73	▼3.31
Independent	Loke Ah Kow @ Loke Koon Kam	2,099	9.06	▲9.06
Total valid votes		23,168	100.00	
Total rejected ballots		904		
Unreturned ballots		0		
Turnout		24,072	76.59	▼1.05
Registered electors		31,428		
Majority		6,687	28.86	▼0.49
BN hold		Swing		

Malaysian general election, 1978
Party	Candidate	Votes	%	∆%
BN	Tan Koon Swan	11,411	56.16	▼8.64
DAP	Wan Sai Kai	5,447	26.81	▼8.39
PAS	Tengku Puji Tengku Abdul Hamid	3,462	17.04	▲17.04
Total valid votes		20,320	100.00	
Total rejected ballots		622		
Unreturned ballots		0		
Turnout		20,942	77.64	▼1.00
Registered electors		26,973		
Majority		5,964	29.35	▼0.25
BN hold		Swing		

Malaysian general election, 1974
Party	Candidate	Votes	%	∆%
BN	Abdullah Majid	11,036	64.80	▲64.80
DAP	Yusof Bador	5,996	35.20	▲35.20
Total valid votes		17,032	100.00	
Total rejected ballots		771		
Unreturned ballots		0		
Turnout		17,803	78.64	
Registered electors		22,638		
Majority		5,040	29.60	
BN hold		Swing		

Malaysian general election, 1969
Party	Candidate	Votes	%	∆%
On the nomination day, Hamzah Abu Samah won uncontested.
Alliance	Hamzah Abu Samah			
Total valid votes			100.00	
Total rejected ballots				
Unreturned ballots				
Turnout				
Registered electors		29,327		
Majority				
Alliance hold		Swing		

Malaysian general by-election, 14 August 1967 Upon the death of incumbent, Hussein Hassan
Party	Candidate	Votes	%	∆%
On the nomination day, Hamzah Abu Samah won uncontested.
Alliance	Hamzah Abu Samah			
Total valid votes			100.00	
Total rejected ballots				
Unreturned ballots				
Turnout				
Registered electors				
Majority				
Alliance hold		Swing		

Malaysian general election, 1964
Party	Candidate	Votes	%	∆%
Alliance	Hussein Hassan	11,332	69.40	▲12.53
Socialist Front	Abu Bakar Resat	4,996	30.60	▼12.53
Total valid votes		16,328	100.00	
Total rejected ballots		968		
Unreturned ballots		0		
Turnout		17,296	80.11	▲11.01
Registered electors		21,590		
Majority		6,336	38.80	▲25.06
Alliance hold		Swing		

Malayan general election, 1959
Party	Candidate	Votes	%
Alliance	Hussein Hassan	6,764	56.87
Socialist Front	Abu Bakar Resat	5,130	43.13
Total valid votes		11,894	100.00
Total rejected ballots		101	
Unreturned ballots		0	
Turnout		11,995	69.10
Registered electors		17,359	
Majority		1,634	13.74
This was a new constituency created.
