= Lobak (state constituency) =

Political subdivision in Malaysia

Lobak (N11)
Negeri Sembilan constituency

State constituency
- Legislature: Negeri Sembilan State Legislative Assembly
MLA
Chew Seh Yong
PH
- Constituency created: 1995
- First contested: 1995
- Last contested: 2026

Demographics
- Electors (2023): 23,193

N11 Lobak within Negeri Sembilan, as used for the 2023 and 2026 state elections

Lobak is a state constituency in Negeri Sembilan, Malaysia, that has been represented in the Negeri Sembilan State Legislative Assembly.

The state constituency was first contested in 1995 and is mandated to return a single Assemblyman to the Negeri Sembilan State Legislative Assembly under the first-past-the-post voting system.

== Demographics ==
Ethnic breakdown of Lobak's electorate as of 2026
1. Chinese (71.5%)
2. Indian (21.9%)
3. Malay (4.60%)
4. Other ethnicities (2.00%)

== History ==
=== Polling districts ===
According to the federal gazette issued on 23 July 2026, the Lobak constituency is divided into 6 polling districts.

State constituency	Polling district	Code	Location
Lobak (N11)	Kg Lobak	128/11/01	SJK (C) Pei Hua
Lobak (N11)	Ulu Temiang	128/11/02	SJK (C) Chi Hwa
Lobak (N11)	Jalan Manickavasagam	128/11/03	SJK (T) Lobak
Lobak (N11)	Lobak	128/11/04	SJK (C) Chung Hua Seremban
Lobak (N11)	Taman Templer	128/11/05	SJK (C) Chan Wa
Lobak (N11)	Kampong Nee Yan	128/11/06	SJK (C) Kuo Min

=== Representation history ===
Members of Assembly for Lobak
Assembly	No	Years	Name	Party
Constituency created from Ampangan, Mambau and Rahang
9th	N22	1995-1999	Khoo Seng Hock (邱成福)	DAP
10th	N22	1999-2004	Khoo Seng Hock (邱成福)	BN (MCA)
11th	N11	2004-2008	Anthony Loke Siew Fook (陸兆福)	DAP
12th	N11	2008-2013	Anthony Loke Siew Fook (陸兆福)	PR (DAP)
13th	N11	2013-2018	Siow Kim Leong (蕭金良)	PR (DAP)
14th	N11	2018-2023	Chew Seh Yong (周世揚)	PH (DAP)
15th	N11	2023–2026	Chew Seh Yong (周世揚)	PH (DAP)
16th	N11	2026–present	Chew Seh Yong (周世揚)	PH (DAP)

== Election results ==
Negeri Sembilan state election, 2026
Party	Candidate	Votes	%	∆%
PH	Chew Seh Yong	13,064	86.66	▼7.73
PN	Kumar S Paramasivam	2,011	13.34	▲7.73
Total valid votes		15,075	100.00	
Total rejected ballots		187		
Unreturned ballots		16		
Turnout		15,278	66.20	▲0.14
Registered electors		23,079		
Majority		11,053	73.32	▼15.46
PH hold		Swing		

Negeri Sembilan state election, 2023
Party	Candidate	Votes	%	∆%
PH	Chew Seh Yong	14,357	94.39	▲94.39
PN	Ng Soon Lean	853	5.61	▲5.61
Total valid votes		15,210	100.00	
Total rejected ballots		99		
Unreturned ballots		12		
Turnout		15,321	66.06	▼16.64
Registered electors		23,193		
Majority		13,504	88.78	▲13.27
PH hold		Swing		

Negeri Sembilan state election, 2018
Party	Candidate	Votes	%	∆%
PKR	Chew Seh Yong	13,647	87.46	▲87.46
BN	Lim Kok Kian	1,865	11.95	▼11.36
People's Alternative Party	Balamurugan Sanmugam	92	0.59	▲0.59
Total valid votes		15,604	100.00	
Total rejected ballots		152		
Unreturned ballots		39		
Turnout		15,795	82.70	▼1.54
Registered electors		19,101		
Majority		11,782	75.51	▲22.13
PKR hold		Swing		

Negeri Sembilan state election, 2013
Party	Candidate	Votes	%	∆%
DAP	Siow Kim Leong	11,880	76.69	▼3.31
BN	How Kok Yew @ Ho Kok Yew	3,610	23.31	▲3.31
Total valid votes		15,490	100.00	
Total rejected ballots		207		
Unreturned ballots		0		
Turnout		15,697	84.24	▲6.98
Registered electors		18,634		
Majority		8,270	53.38	▼6.62
DAP hold		Swing		

Negeri Sembilan state election, 2008
Party	Candidate	Votes	%	∆%
DAP	Loke Siew Fook	9,244	80.00	▲20.92
BN	Siow Koi Voon	2,316	20.00	▼20.92
Total valid votes		11,560	100.00	
Total rejected ballots		143		
Unreturned ballots		11		
Turnout		11,714	77.26	▲6.39
Registered electors		15,162		
Majority		6,928	60.00	▲41.90
DAP hold		Swing		

Negeri Sembilan state election, 2004
Party	Candidate	Votes	%	∆%
DAP	Loke Siew Fook	5,991	59.08	▲13.80
BN	Khoo Seng Hock	4,149	40.98	▼11.15
Total valid votes		10,140	100.00	
Total rejected ballots		180		
Unreturned ballots		18		
Turnout		10,338	70.87	▲0.45
Registered electors		14,588		
Majority		1,842	18.10	▲11.25
DAP gain from BN		Swing		?

Negeri Sembilan state election, 1999
Party	Candidate	Votes	%	∆%
BN	Khoo Seng Hock	5,983	52.13	▲4.62
DAP	Wong Zee Nyok	5,196	45.28	▼7.21
MDP	Wong Bee Kar	297	2.59	▲2.59
Total valid votes		11,476	100.00	
Total rejected ballots		242		
Unreturned ballots		168		
Turnout		11,886	70.42	▼2.63
Registered electors		16,879		
Majority		787	6.85	▲1.87
BN gain from DAP		Swing		?

Negeri Sembilan state election, 1995
Party	Candidate	Votes	%
DAP	Khoo Seng Hock	6,127	52.49
BN	Wong Bee Kar	5,545	47.51
Total valid votes		11,672	93.71
Total rejected ballots		267	
Unreturned ballots		516	
Turnout		12,455	73.05
Registered electors		17,051	
Majority		582	4.98
This is a new created constituency
