= Chow Yu Hui =

Malaysian politician

Yang Berhormat Tuan Chow Yu Hui MP
- 邹宇晖

Member of the Malaysian Parliament for Raub
- Incumbent
- Assumed office 19 November 2022
- Preceded by: Tengku Zulpuri Shah Raja Puji (PH−DAP)
- Majority: 4,357 (2022)

Member of the Pahang State Legislative Assembly for Tras
- In office 9 May 2018 – 19 November 2022
- Preceded by: Choong Siew Onn (PR−DAP)
- Succeeded by: Tengku Zulpuri Shah Raja Puji (PH−DAP)
- Majority: 9,953 (2018)

Member of the Pahang State Legislative Assembly for Bilut
- In office 5 May 2013 – 9 May 2018
- Preceded by: Hoh Khai Mun (BN–MCA)
- Succeeded by: Lee Chin Chen (PH−DAP)
- Majority: 2,607 (2013)

Personal details
- Born: 11 July 1983 (age 43) Taiping, Perak, Malaysia
- Party: Democratic Action Party (DAP) (since 2000)
- Other political affiliations: Barisan Alternatif (BA) (2000–2004); Pakatan Rakyat (PR) (2008−2015); Pakatan Harapan (PH) (since 2015)
- Education: University of Malaya
- Occupation: Politician

Chow Yu Hui (born 11 July 1983) is a Malaysian politician who has served as the Member of Parliament (MP) for Raub since November 2022. He served as Member of the Pahang State Legislative Assembly (MLA) for Tras from May 2018 to November 2022 and for Bilut from May 2013 to May 2018. He is a member of the Democratic Action Party (DAP), a component party of the Pakatan Harapan (PH) and formerly Pakatan Rakyat (PR) coalitions.

== Election results ==
Pahang State Legislative Assembly
Year	Constituency	Candidate	Votes	Pct	Opponent(s)	Votes	Pct	Ballots cast	Majority	Turnout
2013	N33 Bilut	Chow Yu Hui (DAP)	8,663	58.86%	Leong Kim Soon (MCA)	6,056	41.14%	14,719	2,607	84.74%
2018	N07 Tras	Chow Yu Hui (DAP)	15,660	68.47%	Ng Leap Pong (MCA)	5,707	24.95%	22,873	9,953	80.48%
2018	N07 Tras	Chow Yu Hui (DAP)	15,660	68.47%	Chin Choy Hee (PAS)	1,506	6.58%	22,873	9,953	80.48%

Parliament of Malaysia
Year	Constituency	Candidate	Votes	Pct	Opponent(s)	Votes	Pct	Ballots cast	Majority	Turnout
2022	P080 Raub	Chow Yu Hui (DAP)	21,613	38.43%	Fakrunizam Ibrahim (BERSATU)	17,256	30.69%	56,235	4,357	74.92%
2022	P080 Raub	Chow Yu Hui (DAP)	21,613	38.43%	Chong Sin Woon (MCA)	16,939	30.12%	56,235	4,357	74.92%
2022	P080 Raub	Chow Yu Hui (DAP)	21,613	38.43%	Norkhairul Anuar Mohamed Nor (PEJUANG)	427	0.76%	56,235	4,357	74.92%

== Honours ==
=== Honours of Malaysia ===
- Malaysia
  - Recipient of the 17th Yang di-Pertuan Agong Installation Medal (2024)
