= Bilut =

Political subdivision in Malaysia

Bilut (N33)
Pahang constituency

State constituency
- Legislature: Pahang State Legislative Assembly
MLA
Lee Chin Chen
PH
- Constituency created: 1984
- First contested: 1986
- Last contested: 2022

Demographics
- Electors (2022): 24,286

Bilut is a state constituency in Pahang, Malaysia, that has been represented in the Pahang State Legislative Assembly.

== Demographics ==
Ethnic breakdown of Bilut's electorate as of 2022
1. Chinese (51.4%)
2. Malay (37.2%)
3. Indian (9.58%)
4. Other ethnicities (1.76%)

== History ==
=== Polling districts ===
According to the federal gazette issued on 31 October 2022, the Bilut constituency is divided into 10 polling districts.

State constituency	Polling district	Code	Location
Bilut（N33）	FELDA Lurah Bilut	089/33/01	SMK LKTP Lurah Bilut
Bilut（N33）	Kampung Lebu	089/33/02	SK Lebu
Bilut（N33）	Bandar Bentong	089/33/03	SK Sulaiman
Bilut（N33）	Kemansur	089/33/04	SJK (C) Khai Mun Pagi
Bilut（N33）	Chamang	089/33/05	SJK (T) Bentong
Bilut（N33）	Repas	089/33/06	SJK (C) Khai Mun Repas
Bilut（N33）	Chamang Luar	089/33/07	SJK (C) Khai Mun Chamang
Bilut（N33）	Chamang Baharu	089/33/08	SMJK Khai Mun
Bilut（N33）	Desa Damai	089/33/09	Dewan Orang Ramai Desa Damai
Bilut（N33）	Sungai Penjuring	089/33/10	SJK (C) Sungai Penjuring

=== Representation history ===
Members of the Legislative Assembly for Bilut
Assembly	No	Years	Name	Party
Constituency created from Bandar Bentong, Karak and Bandar Raub
7th	N25	1986-1990	Poo Yew Choy (浦耀才)	BN (MCA)
8th	N25	1990-1995	Poo Yew Choy (浦耀才)	BN (MCA)
9th	N28	1995-1999	Hoh Khai Mun (何启文)	BN (MCA)
10th	N28	1999-2004	Hoh Khai Mun (何启文)	BN (MCA)
11th	N33	2004-2008	Hoh Khai Mun (何启文)	BN (MCA)
12th	N33	2008-2013	Hoh Khai Mun (何启文)	BN (MCA)
13th	N33	2013-2018	Chow Yu Hui (邹宇晖)	PR (DAP)
14th	N33	2018-2022	Lee Chin Chen (李政贤)	PH (DAP)
15th	N33	2022–present	Lee Chin Chen (李政贤)	PH (DAP)

== Election results ==
Pahang state election, 2022: Bilut
Party	Candidate	Votes	%	∆%
PH	Lee Chin Chen	8,895	47.56	▲47.56
BN	Wong Siew Mun	5,784	30.93	▼1.09
PN	Chandra Baladedha	3,363	17.98	▲17.98
PEJUANG	Mohd Shokri Mahmood	433	2.32	▲2.32
Total valid votes		18,475	100.00	
Total rejected ballots		188		
Unreturned ballots		39		
Turnout		18,702	77.01	▼7.01
Registered electors		24,286		
Majority		3,111	16.84	▼6.82
PH hold		Swing		

Pahang state election, 2018: Bilut
Party	Candidate	Votes	%	∆%
PKR	Lee Chin Chen	8,798	55.68	▲55.68
BN	Poo Mun Hoong	5,059	32.02	▼9.13
PAS	Mohd Zamri Nong	1,944	12.30	▲12.30
Total valid votes		15,801	100.00	
Total rejected ballots		201		
Unreturned ballots		47		
Turnout		16,049	84.02	▼0.90
Registered electors		19,101		
Majority		3,739	23.66	▲5.95
PKR hold		Swing		

Pahang state election, 2013: Bilut
Party	Candidate	Votes	%	∆%
DAP	Chow Yu Hui	8,663	58.86	▲13.92
BN	Leong Kim Soon	6,056	41.14	▼13.92
Total valid votes		14,719	100.00	
Total rejected ballots		263		
Unreturned ballots		33		
Turnout		15,015	84.93	▲11.13
Registered electors		17,680		
Majority		2,607	17.71	▲7.58
DAP gain from BN		Swing		-

Pahang state election, 2008: Bilut
Party	Candidate	Votes	%	∆%
BN	Hoh Khai Mun	6,024	55.06	▼16.42
DAP	Tam Tai San	4,916	44.94	▲16.42
Total valid votes		10,940	100.00	
Total rejected ballots		318		
Unreturned ballots		99		
Turnout		11,357	73.79	▲0.47
Registered electors		15,390		
Majority		1,108	10.13	▼32.84
BN hold		Swing		

Pahang state election, 2004: Bilut
Party	Candidate	Votes	%	∆%
BN	Hoh Khai Mun	7,666	71.48	▲12.47
DAP	Tam Tai San	3,058	28.52	▼12.47
Total valid votes		10,724	100.00	
Total rejected ballots		253		
Unreturned ballots		177		
Turnout		11,154	73.33	▼0.83
Registered electors		15,211		
Majority		4,608	42.97	▲24.94
BN hold		Swing		

Pahang state election, 1999: Bilut
Party	Candidate	Votes	%	∆%
BN	Hoh Khai Mun	6,207	59.01	▼10.56
DAP	Soon San Choong	4,311	40.99	▲10.56
Total valid votes		10,518	100.00	
Total rejected ballots		289		
Unreturned ballots		567		
Turnout		11,374	74.16	▲1.23
Registered electors		15,337		
Majority		1,896	18.03	▼21.12
BN hold		Swing		

Pahang state election, 1995: Bilut
Party	Candidate	Votes	%	∆%
BN	Hoh Khai Mun	6,979	69.57	▲12.81
DAP	Leong Chee Meng	3,052	30.43	▼12.81
Total valid votes		10,031	100.00	
Total rejected ballots		344		
Unreturned ballots		624		
Turnout		10,999	72.93	▼1.05
Registered electors		15,082		
Majority		3,927	39.15	▲25.63
BN hold		Swing		

Pahang state election, 1990: Bilut
Party	Candidate	Votes	%	∆%
BN	Poo Yew Choy	7,161	56.76	▲3.32
DAP	Woo Chee Wan	5,455	43.24	▼3.32
Total valid votes		12,616	100.00	
Total rejected ballots		415		
Unreturned ballots		163		
Turnout		13,194	73.98	▼0.96
Registered electors		17,834		
Majority		1,706	13.52	▲6.63
BN hold		Swing		

Pahang state election, 1986: Bilut
Party	Candidate	Votes	%
BN	Poo Yew Choy	5,911	53.44
DAP	Kam Hah @ Cheong Koon Kam	5,149	46.56
Total valid votes		11,060	100.00
Total rejected ballots		364	
Unreturned ballots		0	
Turnout		11,424	74.95
Registered electors		15,243	
Majority		762	6.89
This was a new constituency created.
