= Anthony Loke =

Malaysian politician

Yang Berhormat Tuan Loke Siew Fook MP
- 陆兆福
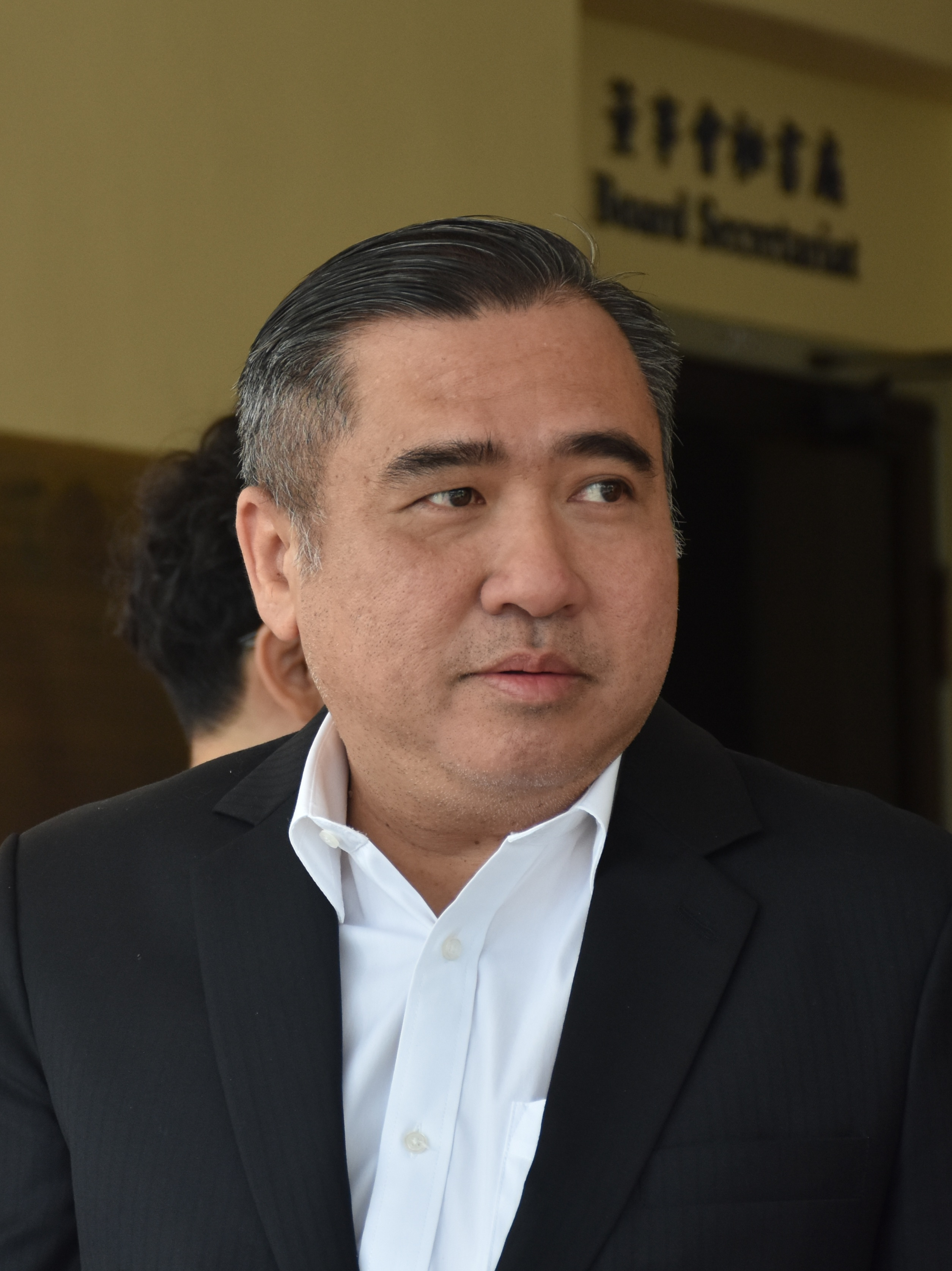
- Loke in 2024

Minister of Transport
- In office 3 December 2022 – 9 November 2026
- Monarchs: Abdullah; Ibrahim
- Prime Minister: Anwar Ibrahim
- Deputy: Hasbi Habibollah
- Preceded by: Wee Ka Siong
- Constituency: Seremban
- In office 21 May 2018 – 24 February 2020
- Monarchs: Muhammad V; Abdullah
- Prime Minister: Mahathir Mohamad
- Deputy: Kamarudin Jaffar
- Preceded by: Liow Tiong Lai
- Succeeded by: Wee Ka Siong
- Constituency: Seremban

6th Secretary-General of the Democratic Action Party
- Incumbent
- Assumed office 20 March 2022
- Deputy: See list: Sivakumar Varatharaju (2022–25); Tengku Zulpuri Shah Raja Puji (2022–25); Liew Chin Tong (2022–25); Steven Sim Chee Keong (since 2025); Hannah Yeoh (since 2025); Ramkarpal Singh (since 2025)
- National Chairman: Lim Guan Eng (2022–2025); Gobind Singh Deo (since 2025)
- Preceded by: Lim Guan Eng

State Chairman of the Democratic Action Party of Negeri Sembilan
- In office 2004 – 10 August 2026
- Deputy: Gunasekaren Palasamy
- Secretary-General: Lim Guan Eng (2004–22); Himself (2022–26)
- National Chairman: Karpal Singh (2004–2014); Tan Kok Wai (2014–2022); Lim Guan Eng (2022–2025); Gobind Singh Deo (2025–2026)
- Preceded by: Wong Yauk
- Succeeded by: Arul Kumar Jambunathan

2nd Parliamentary Leader of the Democratic Action Party
- In office 11 July 2018 – 20 March 2022
- Secretary-General: Lim Guan Eng
- Preceded by: Lim Kit Siang
- Succeeded by: Nga Kor Ming

Youth Chief of the Democratic Action Party
- In office 6 December 2008 – 9 December 2012
- Secretary-General: Lim Guan Eng
- Deputy: Lee Ying Ha
- Preceded by: Nga Kor Ming
- Succeeded by: Teo Kok Seong

Member of the Malaysian Parliament for Seremban
- Incumbent
- Assumed office 5 May 2013
- Preceded by: John Fernandez (PR–DAP)
- Majority: 12,553 (2013); 30,694 (2018); 30,841 (2022)

Member of the Malaysian Parliament for Rasah
- In office 8 March 2008 – 5 May 2013
- Preceded by: Goh Siow Huat (BN–MCA)
- Succeeded by: Teo Kok Seong (PR–DAP)
- Majority: 13,151 (2008)

Member of the Negeri Sembilan State Legislative Assembly for Chennah
- In office 5 May 2013 – 1 August 2026
- Preceded by: Siow Chen Pin (BN–MCA)
- Succeeded by: Siow Kong Choon (BN–MCA)
- Majority: 1,098 (2013); 1,155 (2018); 2,200 (2023)

Member of the Negeri Sembilan State Legislative Assembly for Lobak
- In office 21 March 2004 – 5 May 2013
- Preceded by: Khoo Seng Hock (BN–MCA)
- Succeeded by: Siow Kim Leong (PR–DAP)
- Majority: 1,842 (2004); 6,928 (2008)

Personal details
- Born: Loke Siew Fook; 28 April 1977 (age 49) Seremban, Negeri Sembilan, Malaysia
- Party: Democratic Action Party (since 1994)
- Other political affiliations: Gagasan Rakyat (1994–96); Barisan Alternatif (1999–2004); Pakatan Rakyat (2008–15); Pakatan Harapan (since 2015)
- Spouse: Ng Chi Ling
- Education: National University of Malaysia (BSc); University of Malaya (MPA)
- Occupation: Politician
- Website: lokesiewfook.blogspot.com

Anthony Loke Siew Fook (Note: simplified Chinese: 陆兆福; traditional Chinese: 陸兆福; Cantonese Yale: Luhk Siuh-fūk; pinyin: Lù Zhàofú; Pe̍h-ōe-jī: Lio̍k Tiāu-ho̍k. In this Chinese name, the family name is Loke (陆). In accordance with custom, the Western-style name is Anthony Loke and the Chinese-style name is Loke Siew Fook.) (born 28 April 1977) is a Malaysian politician who served as the Minister of Transport from 2022 until his resignation in 2026, and previously from 2018 to 2020. A member of Democratic Action Party, he has served as the party's sixth secretary-general since 2022 and also served as Member of Parliament (MP) for Seremban since 2013.

Born in Seremban, Loke graduated from the National University of Malaysia in 2000 with a bachelor's degree in science. He served as the MP for Rasah from March 2008 to May 2013, and Member of the Negeri Sembilan State Legislative Assembly (MLA) for Chennah from May 2013 to August 2026, as well as Lobak from March 2004 to May 2013.

He was State Chairman of DAP Negeri Sembilan from 2004 to 2026, when he resigned following that year's state election where he failed to defend his seat. He has held a number of other party leadership roles, and was also the Leader of the Opposition in Negeri Sembilan.

== Early life and education ==
Anthony Loke Siew Fook was born in Seremban, Negeri Sembilan, Malaysia. He was educated at St. Paul's Institution and Seri Ampangan High School. He graduated from National University of Malaysia (UKM) in 2000 with a Bachelor Degree of Science (BSc) in Development Science.

His grandfather, Loke Ching Fatt (Chinese: 陸禎发) is the owner of the Loke Ching Kee (Chinese: 陸禎記) restaurant where the now famous Chinese New Year dish yee sang became popular. He presented a history book on the dish in an audience with the Yang di-Pertuan Besar of Negeri Sembilan Tuanku Muhriz on 31 January 2020.

== Political career ==
Loke joined the DAP in 1994 at the age of 17, the minimum age required to become a member.

He made his electoral debut in the 2004 Negeri Sembilan state election, contesting in Lobak. He won the contest and was re-elected in 2008.

Following his victory in 2004, he was elected to the DAP's Central Executive Committee (CEC), and has been a member of this body since. He was also appointed the party's director of political education.

In the 2008 general election, Loke was elected to the Dewan Rakyat representing Rasah, and became secretary of the party's political education bureau.

In 2012, he was appointed the party's organising secretary.

In the 2013 general election, he contested in Chennah and Seremban at the state and federal level respectively, winning in both.

He successfully defended his two seats in the 2018 election, following which he was appointed Minister of Transport by Prime Minister Mahathir Mohamad. He lost his position in federal government as a result of the 2020–2022 Malaysian political crisis.

Loke was appointed the party's 6th Secretary-General replacing Lim Guan Eng in the party's 2022 national congress. He also received the highst number of votes in the election to the party CEC.

In the 2022 general election, he successfully defended his Seremban seat. Following the formation of a coalition government under Anwar Ibrahim, Loke was returned as Minister of Transport.

He was re-elected in the 2023 Negeri Sembilan state election but was defeated in the 2026 Negeri Sembilan state election, prompting his resignation as Chairman of DAP Negeri Sembilan. The party's disappointing performance in three successive state elections, including Sabah and Johor, has led to questions over the party's continued participation in the government frontbench.

Loke had offered to resign as the Minister of Transport on 19 September 2026 following the conditional pardon granted to Najib Razak, pending decision from the Prime Minister, Anwar Ibrahim. As agreed between Anwar and Loke, the resignation took effect on 10 November 2026 after the start of Najib's house arrest.

== Personal life ==
Anthony Loke is married to Ng Chi Ling. He is a Buddhist.

== Election results ==
Parliament of Malaysia
Year	Constituency	Candidate	Votes	Pct	Opponent(s)	Votes	Pct	Ballots cast	Majority	Turnout
2008	P130 Rasah	Anthony Loke Siew Fook (DAP)	34,271	61.87%	Yeow Chai Thiam (MCA)	21,120	38.13%	56,654	13,151	78.56%
2013	P128 Seremban	Anthony Loke Siew Fook (DAP)	45,628	53.12%	Yeow Chai Thiam (MCA)	33,075	38.52%	87,617	12,553	85.64%
2013	P128 Seremban	Anthony Loke Siew Fook (DAP)	45,628	53.12%	Abd Halim Abdullah (BERJASA)	6,866	8.00%	87,617	12,553	85.64%
2013	P128 Seremban	Anthony Loke Siew Fook (DAP)	45,628	53.12%	John Fernandez (IND)	221	0.26%	87,617	12,553	85.64%
2013	P128 Seremban	Anthony Loke Siew Fook (DAP)	45,628	53.12%	Bujang Abu (IND)	83	0.10%	87,617	12,553	85.64%
2018	P128 Seremban	Anthony Loke Siew Fook (DAP)	55,503	60.45%	Chong Sin Woon (MCA)	24,809	27.02%	93,254	30,694	84.65%
2018	P128 Seremban	Anthony Loke Siew Fook (DAP)	55,503	60.45%	Shariffuddin Ahmad (PAS)	11,506	12.53%	93,254	30,694	84.65%
2022	P128 Seremban	Anthony Loke Siew Fook (DAP)	63,920	51.85%	Mohd Fadli Che Me (PAS)	33,076	26.83%	124,729	30,844	79.32%
2022	P128 Seremban	Anthony Loke Siew Fook (DAP)	63,920	51.85%	Wong Yin Ting (MCA)	24,584	19.94%	124,729	30,844	79.32%
2022	P128 Seremban	Anthony Loke Siew Fook (DAP)	63,920	51.85%	Mohamad Jani Ismail (PEJUANG)	1,336	1.08%	124,729	30,844	79.32%
2022	P128 Seremban	Anthony Loke Siew Fook (DAP)	63,920	51.85%	Izat Lesly (IND)	373	0.30%	124,729	30,844	79.32%

Negeri Sembilan State Legislative Assembly
Year	Constituency	Candidate	Votes	Pct	Opponent(s)	Votes	Pct	Ballots cast	Majority	Turnout
2004	N11 Lobak	Anthony Loke Siew Fook (DAP)	5,991	59.08%	Khoo Seng Hock (MCA)	4,149	40.98%	10,338	1,842	70.87%
2008	N11 Lobak	Anthony Loke Siew Fook (DAP)	9,244	80.00%	Siow Koi Loon (MCA)	2,316	20.00%	11,714	6,928	77.26%
2013	N01 Chennah	Anthony Loke Siew Fook (DAP)	5,128	55.99%	Siow Foo Wen (MCA)	4,030	44.01%	9,372	1,098	83.75%
2018	N01 Chennah	Anthony Loke Siew Fook (DAP)	5,031	50.91%	Seet Tee Gee (MCA)	3,876	39.22%	10,051	1,155	82.94%
2018	N01 Chennah	Anthony Loke Siew Fook (DAP)	5,031	50.91%	Jamalus Mansor (PAS)	975	9.87%	10,051	1,155	82.94%
2023	N01 Chennah	Anthony Loke Siew Fook (DAP)	5,888	61.49%	Rosmadi Arif (BERSATU)	3,688	38.51%	9,576	2,200	65.80%
2026	N01 Chennah	Anthony Loke Siew Fook (DAP)	5,038	46.80%	Siow Kong Choon (MCA)	5,726	53.20%	10,764	688	74.64%

== Honours ==
=== Honours of Malaysia ===
- Malaysia
  - Recipient of the 16th Yang di-Pertuan Agong Installation Medal (2019)
  - Recipient of the 17th Yang di-Pertuan Agong Installation Medal (2024)

== Notes ==
Political offices
Preceded by Liow Tiong Lai	Minister of Transport (Malaysia); 21 May 2018–24 February 2020	Succeeded by Wee Ka Siong
Parliament of Malaysia
Preceded by John Fernandez	Member of Parliament for Seremban; 5 May 2013–present	Incumbent
Preceded by Goh Siow Huat	Member of Parliament for Rasah; 8 March 2008–5 May 2013	Succeeded by Teo Kok Seong
Party political offices
Preceded by Lim Kit Siang	Parliamentary Leader of the Democratic Action Party; 11 July 2018–20 March 2022	Succeeded by Nga Kor Ming
