= Tengku Zulpuri Shah Raja Puji =

Malaysian politician

Yang Berhormat Mulia Tengku Zulpuri Shah Raja Puji MLA
- تڠكو ذوالڤوري شاه بن راج ڤوجي

Deputy Minister of Water, Land and Natural Resources
- In office 2 July 2018 – 24 February 2020
- Monarchs: Muhammad V (2018–2019); Abdullah (2019–2020)
- Prime Minister: Mahathir Mohamad
- Minister: Xavier Jayakumar Arulanandam
- Preceded by: James Dawos Mamit (Water); Hamim Samuri (Natural Resources)
- Succeeded by: Ali Biju (Deputy Minister of Energy and Natural Resources); Ahmad Masrizal Muhammad (Deputy Minister of Minister of Environment and Water)
- Constituency: Raub

Member of the Malaysian Parliament for Raub
- In office 9 May 2018 – 19 November 2022
- Preceded by: Mohd Ariff Sabri Abdul Aziz (PR–DAP)
- Succeeded by: Chow Yu Hui (PH−DAP)
- Majority: 3,159 (2018)

Member of the Pahang State Legislative Assembly for Tras
- Incumbent
- Assumed office 19 November 2022
- Preceded by: Chow Yu Hui (PH−DAP)
- Majority: 11,397 (2022)

Member of the Pahang State Legislative Assembly for Mentakab
- In office 5 May 2013 – 9 May 2018
- Preceded by: Chuah Boon Seong (BN–MCA)
- Succeeded by: Woo Chee Wan (PH−DAP)
- Majority: 1,554 (2013)

Deputy Secretary-General of the Democratic Action Party
- In office 20 March 2022 – 16 March 2025 Serving with Sivakumar Varatharaju & Liew Chin Tong
- Secretary-General: Anthony Loke Siew Fook
- National Chairman: Lim Guan Eng
- Preceded by: Teresa Kok Suh Sim

National Vice Chairman of the Democratic Action Party
- In office 12 November 2017 – 20 March 2022 Serving with M. Kulasegaran & Chow Kon Yeow & Chong Chieng Jen
- Secretary-General: Lim Guan Eng
- Chairman: Tan Kok Wai
- Preceded by: Ariffin Omar

Other roles
- 2013–2018: Opposition Leader of Pahang State Legislative Assembly

Personal details
- Born: Tengku Zulpuri Shah bin Raja Puji; 15 July 1964 (age 61) Raub, Pahang, Malaysia
- Party: Democratic Action Party (DAP) (since 2000)
- Other political affiliations: Barisan Alternatif (BA) (2000–2004); Pakatan Rakyat (PR) (2008–2015); Pakatan Harapan (PH) (since 2015)

Tengku Zulpuri Shah bin Raja Puji (Jawi: تڠكو ذوالڤوري شاه بن راج ڤوجي) (born 15 July 1964) is a Malaysian politician who has served as Member of the Pahang State Legislative Assembly (MLA) for Tras since November 2022. He served as Deputy Minister of Water, Land and Natural Resources in the Pakatan Harapan (PH) administration under former Prime Minister Mahathir Mohamad and former Minister Xavier Jayakumar Arulanandam from July 2018 to the collapse of the PH administration in February 2020 and the Member of Parliament (MP) for Raub from May 2018 to November 2022, State Leader of the Opposition of Pahang and the MLA for Mentakab from May 2013 to May 2018 and member of the Selayang Municipal Council (MPS). He is a member of the Democratic Action Party (DAP), a component party of the PH coalition. He has served as the Deputy Secretary-General of DAP since March 2022 and is the State Deputy Chairman of Pahang of DAP. He also served as the National Vice Chairman of DAP from November 2017 to March 2022. In addition, he was the sole Malay MP of DAP from 2018 to 2022.

== Political career ==
=== Appointment as Deputy Secretary-general of DAP ===
On 20 March 2022, on the 17th DAP National Congress, Zulpuri Shah was appointed as Deputy Secretary-general of DAP serving together with Sivakumar Varatharaju and Liew Chin Tong under Secretary-general, Anthony Loke.

== Personal life ==
He is also a member of the Pahang royal family and son of Tengku Puji Tengku Abdul Hamid, former Deputy Commissioner of Pahang and former committee member of the Malaysian Islamic Party (PAS).

== Election results ==
Pahang State Legislative Assembly
Year	Constituency	Candidate	Votes	Pct	Opponent(s)	Votes	Pct	Ballots cast	Majority	Turnout
2013	N30 Mentakab	Tengku Zulpuri Shah Raja Puji (DAP)	7,882	55.47%	Chuah Boon Seong (MCA)	6,328	44.53%	14,430	1,554	84.93%
2022	N07 Tras	Tengku Zulpuri Shah Raja Puji (DAP)	17,255	62.32%	Lim Teck Hoe (MCA)	5,858	21.16%	28,001	11,397	72.23%
2022	N07 Tras	Tengku Zulpuri Shah Raja Puji (DAP)	17,255	62.32%	Amirul Kuek (Gerakan)	4,233	15.29%	28,001	11,397	72.23%
2022	N07 Tras	Tengku Zulpuri Shah Raja Puji (DAP)	17,255	62.32%	Mohd Tahir Kassim (PUTRA)	340	1.23%	28,001	11,397	72.23%

Parliament of Malaysia
Year	Constituency	Candidate	Votes	Pct	Opponent(s)	Votes	Pct	Ballots cast	Majority	Turnout
2018	P080 Raub	Tengku Zulpuri Shah Raja Puji (DAP)	20,659	44.89%	Chew Mei Fun (MCA)	17,500	29.66%	46,971	3,159	81.37%
2018	P080 Raub	Tengku Zulpuri Shah Raja Puji (DAP)	20,659	44.89%	Mohd Nilam Abd Manap (PAS)	7,866	17.09%	46,971	3,159	81.37%
2022	P079 Lipis	Tengku Zulpuri Shah Raja Puji (DAP)	6,366	17.75%	Abdul Rahman Mohamad (UMNO)	17,672	49.29%	36,343	6,118	76.09%
2022	P079 Lipis	Tengku Zulpuri Shah Raja Puji (DAP)	6,366	17.75%	Mohamad Shahrum Osman (BERSATU)	11,554	32.22%	36,343	6,118	76.09%
2022	P079 Lipis	Tengku Zulpuri Shah Raja Puji (DAP)	6,366	17.75%	Aishaton Abu Bakar (PEJUANG)	263	0.76%	36,343	6,118	76.09%
