= Tras (state constituency) =

Malaysian political subdivision

Tras (N07)
Pahang constituency

State constituency
- Legislature: Pahang State Legislative Assembly
MLA
Tengku Zulpuri Shah Raja Puji
PH
- Constituency created: 1959
- Constituency abolished: 1974
- Constituency re-created: 1984
- First contested: 1959
- Last contested: 2022

Demographics
- Electors (2022): 38,329

Tras is a state constituency in Pahang, Malaysia, that has been represented in the Pahang State Legislative Assembly.

== Demographics ==
Ethnic breakdown of Tras's electorate as of 2022
1. Chinese (61.0%)
2. Malay (27.7%)
3. Indian (8.86%)
4. Other ethnicities (2.48%)

== History ==
=== Polling districts ===
According to the federal gazette issued on 31 October 2022, the Tras constituency is divided into 16 polling districts.

| State constituency | Polling district | Code | Location |
|---|---|---|---|
| Tras（N07） | Sungai Ruan | 080/07/01 | SJK (C) Sungai Ruan; SMK Sungai Ruan |
| Tras（N07） | Hulu Gali | 080/07/02 | SK Ulu Gali |
| Tras（N07） | Pintu Padang | 080/07/03 | SM Sains Tengku Abdullah |
| Tras（N07） | Kampung Sempalit | 080/07/04 | Balai Raya Kampung Baru Sempalit |
| Tras（N07） | Kampung Baru Sempalit | 080/07/05 | SJK (C) Sempalit |
| Tras（N07） | Simpang Kallang | 080/07/06 | SMK Seri Raub |
| Tras（N07） | Kampung Melayu | 080/07/07 | SMK Dato Shah Bandar Hussain |
| Tras（N07） | Bukit Koman | 080/07/08 | SJK (C) Yuh Hwa |
| Tras（N07） | Sungai Lui | 080/07/09 | SJK (C) Sungai Lui; Tadika Sungai Lui |
| Tras（N07） | Taman Sentosa | 080/07/10 | SK Mahmud |
| Tras（N07） | Bandar Raub | 080/07/11 | SMJK Chung Ching |
| Tras（N07） | Raub Jaya | 080/07/12 | SMK Mahmud |
| Tras（N07） | Pekan Tras | 080/07/13 | SJK (C) Tras |
| Tras（N07） | Bukit Fraser | 080/07/14 | Pejabat Perbadanan Kemajuan Bukit Fraser |
| Tras（N07） | Sungai Chetang | 080/07/15 | SJK (C) Sungai Chetang |
| Tras（N07） | Kampung Sang Lee | 080/07/16 | SJK (C) Sang Lee |

=== Representation history ===
Members of the Legislative Assembly for Tras
| Assembly | No | Years | Name | Party |
Constituency created
Tras
| 1st | N04 | 1959-1964 | Sulaiman Sabudin | Alliance (UMNO) |
| 2nd | N04 | 1964-1969 | Sulaiman Sabudin | Alliance (UMNO) |
| | | 1969-1971 | Assembly dissolved | |
| 3rd | N04 | 1971-1973 | Tengku Mustapha Tengku Seti | Alliance (UMNO) |
| 3rd | N04 | 1973-1974 | Tengku Mustapha Tengku Seti | BN (UMNO) |
Constituency abolished, split into Dong, Bandar Raub and Batu Talam
Constituency recreated from Bandar Raub
Teras
| 7th | N07 | 1986-1990 | Lip Tuck Chee (聂德志) | DAP |
| 8th | N07 | 1990-1995 | Biaw Nga @ Liaw Per Lou (廖培如) | BN (MCA) |
| 9th | N07 | 1995-1999 | Biaw Nga @ Liaw Per Lou (廖培如) | BN (MCA) |
| 10th | N07 | 1999-2004 | Chan Choon Fah (曾俊华) | BN (MCA) |
Tras
| 11th | N07 | 2004-2008 | Chan Choon Fah (曾俊华) | BN (MCA) |
| 12th | N07 | 2008-2013 | Leong Mee Meng (梁美明) | PR (DAP) |
| 13th | N07 | 2013-2018 | Choong Siew Onn 钟绍安) | PR (DAP) |
| 14th | N07 | 2018-2022 | Chow Yu Hui (邹宇晖) | PH (DAP) |
| 15th | N07 | 2022–present | Tengku Zulpuri Shah Raja Puji | PH (DAP) |

== Election results ==
Pahang state election, 2022
| Party | Candidate | Votes | % | ∆% |
|---|---|---|---|---|
| PH | Tengku Zulpuri Shah Raja Puji | 17,255 | 62.32 | ▲62.32 |
| BN | Lim Teck Hoe | 5,858 | 21.16 | ▼3.76 |
| PN | Amirul Mukminin Kuek Abdullah | 4,233 | 15.29 | ▲15.29 |
| PEJUANG | Mohd Tahir Kassim | 340 | 1.23 | ▲1.23 |
| Total valid votes | | 27,686 | 100.00 | |
| Total rejected ballots | | 257 | | |
| Unreturned ballots | | 57 | | |
| Turnout | | 28,000 | 73.05 | ▼7.42 |
| Registered electors | | 38,329 | | |
| Majority | | 11,397 | 41.17 | ▼2.35 |
| PH hold | | Swing | | |

Pahang state election, 2018
| Party | Candidate | Votes | % | ∆% |
|---|---|---|---|---|
| PKR | Chow Yu Hui | 15,660 | 68.47 | ▲68.47 |
| BN | Ng Leap Pong | 5,707 | 24.95 | ▼7.06 |
| PAS | Chin Choy Hee | 1,506 | 6.58 | ▲6.58 |
| Total valid votes | | 22,873 | 100.00 | |
| Total rejected ballots | | 276 | | |
| Unreturned ballots | | 118 | | |
| Turnout | | 23,267 | 80.48 | ▼1.01 |
| Registered electors | | 28,912 | | |
| Majority | | 9,953 | 43.51 | ▲7.53 |
| PKR hold | | Swing | | |

Pahang state election, 2013
| Party | Candidate | Votes | % | ∆% |
|---|---|---|---|---|
| DAP | Choong Siew Onn | 12,777 | 67.99 | ▲9.29 |
| BN | Wing Lay Hiang | 6,015 | 32.01 | ▼9.29 |
| Total valid votes | | 18,792 | 100.00 | |
| Total rejected ballots | | 290 | | |
| Unreturned ballots | | 55 | | |
| Turnout | | 19,137 | 81.49 | ▲10.89 |
| Registered electors | | 23,485 | | |
| Majority | | 6,762 | 35.98 | ▲18.59 |
| DAP hold | | Swing | | |

Pahang state election, 2008
| Party | Candidate | Votes | % | ∆% |
|---|---|---|---|---|
| DAP | Choong Siew Onn | 8,270 | 58.70 | ▲4.17 |
| BN | Chan Choon Fah | 5,819 | 41.30 | ▼4.17 |
| Total valid votes | | 14,089 | 100.00 | |
| Total rejected ballots | | 260 | | |
| Unreturned ballots | | 67 | | |
| Turnout | | 14,416 | 70.60 | ▲0.69 |
| Registered electors | | 20,419 | | |
| Majority | | 2,451 | 17.40 | ▲8.33 |
| DAP hold | | Swing | | |

Pahang state election, 2004
| Party | Candidate | Votes | % | ∆% |
|---|---|---|---|---|
| DAP | Leong Mee Meng | 7,194 | 54.53 | ▲4.97 |
| BN | Chan Choon Fah | 5,998 | 45.47 | ▼4.97 |
| Total valid votes | | 13,192 | 100.00 | |
| Total rejected ballots | | 273 | | |
| Unreturned ballots | | 38 | | |
| Turnout | | 13,503 | 69.91 | ▲1.05 |
| Registered electors | | 19,314 | | |
| Majority | | 1,196 | 9.07 | ▲8.19 |
| DAP gain from BN | | Swing | | - |

Pahang state election, 1999: Teras
| Party | Candidate | Votes | % | ∆% |
|---|---|---|---|---|
| BN | Chan Choon Fah | 6,862 | 50.44 | ▼6.98 |
| DAP | Lip Tuck Chee | 6,743 | 49.56 | ▲10.26 |
| Total valid votes | | 13,605 | 100.00 | |
| Total rejected ballots | | 337 | | |
| Unreturned ballots | | 64 | | |
| Turnout | | 14,006 | 68.87 | ▼2.32 |
| Registered electors | | 20,338 | | |
| Majority | | 119 | 0.87 | ▼17.24 |
| BN hold | | Swing | | |

Pahang state election, 1995: Teras
| Party | Candidate | Votes | % | ∆% |
|---|---|---|---|---|
| BN | Liaw Per Lou | 7,877 | 57.42 | ▲6.98 |
| DAP | Lip Tuck Chee | 5,392 | 39.31 | ▼10.26 |
| Independent | Ibrahim Yusof | 449 | 3.27 | ▲3.27 |
| Total valid votes | | 13,718 | 100.00 | |
| Total rejected ballots | | 216 | | |
| Unreturned ballots | | 198 | | |
| Turnout | | 14,132 | 71.18 | ▼1.02 |
| Registered electors | | 19,853 | | |
| Majority | | 2,485 | 18.11 | ▲17.24 |
| BN hold | | Swing | | |

Pahang state election, 1990: Teras
| Party | Candidate | Votes | % | ∆% |
|---|---|---|---|---|
| BN | Liaw Per Lou | 6,172 | 50.44 | ▲4.53 |
| DAP | Lip Tuck Chee | 6,065 | 49.56 | ▼4.53 |
| Total valid votes | | 12,237 | 100.00 | |
| Total rejected ballots | | 320 | | |
| Unreturned ballots | | 0 | | |
| Turnout | | 12,557 | 72.21 | ▼2.26 |
| Registered electors | | 17,390 | | |
| Majority | | 107 | 0.87 | ▼7.32 |
| BN gain from DAP | | Swing | | - |

Pahang state election, 1986: Teras
| Party | Candidate | Votes | % | ∆% |
|---|---|---|---|---|
| DAP | Lip Tuck Chee | 6,128 | 54.10 | ▲54.10 |
| BN | Liaw Per Lou | 5,200 | 45.90 | ▲45.90 |
| Total valid votes | | 11,328 | 100.00 | |
| Total rejected ballots | | 276 | | |
| Unreturned ballots | | 0 | | |
| Turnout | | 11,604 | 74.47 | |
| Registered electors | | 15,582 | | |
| Majority | | 928 | 8.19 | |
| DAP gain | | Swing | | {{{3}}} |

Pahang state election, 1969
| Party | Candidate | Votes | % | ∆% |
|---|---|---|---|---|
| Alliance | Tengku Mustapha Tengku Seti | 2,678 | 50.11 | ▼16.85 |
| Independent | Cheam Tat Boon | 2,355 | 44.07 | ▲44.07 |
| Parti Sosialis Rakyat Malaysia | Abdullah Lisi | 311 | 5.82 | ▲5.82 |
| Total valid votes | | 5,344 | 100.00 | |
| Total rejected ballots | | 78 | | |
| Unreturned ballots | | 0 | | |
| Turnout | | 5,422 | 75.27 | ▼7.44 |
| Registered electors | | 7,203 | | |
| Majority | | 323 | 6.04 | ▼27.87 |
| Alliance hold | | Swing | | |

Pahang state election, 1964
| Party | Candidate | Votes | % | ∆% |
|---|---|---|---|---|
| Alliance | Sulaiman Shahbuddin | 2,533 | 66.96 | ▼4.42 |
| Socialist Front | Ng Yew Ming | 1,250 | 33.04 | ▲33.04 |
| Total valid votes | | 3,783 | 100.00 | |
| Total rejected ballots | | 288 | | |
| Unreturned ballots | | 0 | | |
| Turnout | | 4,071 | 82.71 | ▼4.05 |
| Registered electors | | 4,922 | | |
| Majority | | 1,283 | 33.91 | ▼22.44 |
| Alliance hold | | Swing | | |

Pahang state election, 1959
| Party | Candidate | Votes | % | ∆% |
|---|---|---|---|---|
| Alliance | Sulaiman Shahbuddin | 2,239 | 71.37 | |
| PMIP | Othman Sabudin | 471 | 15.01 | |
| Independent | Goh Teng Koon | 427 | 13.61 | |
| Total valid votes | | 3,137 | 100.00 | |
| Total rejected ballots | | 74 | | |
| Unreturned ballots | | 0 | | |
| Turnout | | 3,211 | 86.76 | |
| Registered electors | | 3,701 | | |
| Majority | | 1,768 | 56.36 | |
This was a new constituency created.
