= Jelebu (federal constituency) =

Constituency of Negeri Sembilan, Malaysia

Jelebu (P126)
Negeri Sembilan constituency

Federal constituency
- Legislature: Dewan Rakyat
- MP: Jalaluddin Alias; BN
- Constituency created: 1974
- First contested: 1974
- Last contested: 2022

Demographics
- Population (2020): 64,200
- Electors (2026): 60,334
- Area (km²): 1,717
- Pop. density (per km²): 37.4

Jelebu is a federal constituency in Jelebu District and Jempol District, Negeri Sembilan, Malaysia, that has been represented in the Dewan Rakyat since 1974.

The federal constituency was created in the 1974 redistribution and is mandated to return a single member to the Dewan Rakyat under the first past the post voting system.

== Demographics ==
Ethnic breakdown of Jelebu's electorate as of 2022
1. Malay (67.1%)
2. Chinese (23.4%)
3. Indian (5.60%)
4. Other ethnicities (3.90%)

As of 2020, Jelebu has a population of 64,200 people.

Age breakdown of Jelebu's electorate as of 2022
1. 18-20 (4.74%)
2. 21-29 (16.9%)
3. 30-39 (23.8%)
4. 40-49 (19.3%)
5. 50-59 (13.0%)
6. 60-69 (12.5%)
7. 70-79 (7.15%)
8. 80-89 (2.18%)
9. above 90 (0.39%)
Gender breakdown of Jelebu's electorate as of 2022
1. Male (50.5%)
2. Female (49.5%)

== History ==
=== Polling districts ===
According to the gazette issued on 23 July 2026, the Jelebu constituency has a total of 35 polling districts.

State constituency	Polling districts	Code	Location
Chennah（N01）	Kampong Sungai Buloh	126/01/01	SK Sungai Buloh
Chennah（N01）	Durian Tipus	126/01/02	SK Durian Tipus
Chennah（N01）	Simpang Durian	126/01/03	SMK Teriang Hilir
Chennah（N01）	Kampong Chennah	126/01/04	SK Datuk Udang Abdullah; Balai Raya Kampung Orang Asli Tohor
Chennah（N01）	Pekan Titi	126/01/05	SJK (C) Chun Yin
Chennah（N01）	Sungai Muntoh	126/01/06	SJK (C) Kg. Baru Sungai Muntoh
Chennah（N01）	Kampong Seperi	126/01/07	Balai Raya Kampung Seperi Jelebu
Chennah（N01）	Petaling	126/01/08	SJK (C) Kg. Baru Petaling
Chennah（N01）	Kampong Gagu	126/01/09	Balai Raya Kampung Gagu
Pertang (N02)	Jerang	126/02/01	Balai Raya Kampung Jerang
Pertang (N02)	Kampong Lakai	126/02/02	SK Putra
Pertang (N02)	Pasoh 4	126/02/03	SK (FELDA) Pasoh 4
Pertang (N02)	Pasoh 1	126/02/04	SK Pasoh Satu
Pertang (N02)	Simpang Pertang	126/02/05	SJK (C) Simpang Pertang
Pertang (N02)	Kampong Petaseh	126/02/06	SK Petaseh
Pertang (N02)	Pertang	126/02/07	SJK (C) Kg. Baru Pertang
Pertang (N02)	Kampong Gelang	126/02/08	SK Gelang Terusan
Sungai Lui (N03)	Sungai Lui	126/03/01	SK Sungai Lui
Sungai Lui (N03)	Lui Timor	126/03/02	SK Lui Timor
Sungai Lui (N03)	Lui Muda	126/03/03	SK (FELDA) Lui Muda
Sungai Lui (N03)	Lui Selatan	126/03/04	SK (FELDA) Lui Selatan
Sungai Lui (N03)	Pulapol Ayer Hitam	126/03/05	SK Pulapah
Sungai Lui (N03)	Ladang Ayer Hitam	126/03/06	SJK (T) Ladang Air Hitam
Sungai Lui (N03)	Kampong Bahru Ayer Hitam	126/03/07	SK Ayer Hitam
Sungai Lui (N03)	Lui Barat	126/03/08	SMK (FELDA) Lui Barat
Sungai Lui (N03)	Pasoh 3	126/03/09	SK (FELDA) Pasoh 3
Sungai Lui (N03)	Pasoh 2	126/03/10	SK (FELDA) Pasoh 2
Sungai Lui (N03)	Kampung Serampang Indah	126/03/11	SK Sungai Sampo
Klawang (N04)	Peradong	126/04/01	SK Peradong
Klawang (N04)	Ladang Jelebu	126/04/02	MRSM Kuala Klawang
Klawang (N04)	Kampong Kampai	126/04/03	SK Kampai
Klawang (N04)	Kampung Kuala Klawang	126/04/04	SK Kuala Klawang
Klawang (N04)	Pekan Kuala Klawang	126/04/05	SK Undang Jelebu
Klawang (N04)	Kampong Kemin	126/04/06	Dewan Orang Ramai Kampung Batu Serampai
Klawang (N04)	Kampung Amar Penghulu	126/04/07	SK Amar Penghulu

=== Representation history ===
Members of Parliament for Jelebu
Parliament	No	Years	Member	Party	Vote Share
Constituency created, renamed from Jelebu-Jempol
4th	P089	1974–1978	Rais Yatim (رئيس يتيم)	BN (UMNO)	14,138; 73.15%
5th	P089	1978–1982	Abdul Samad Idris (عبدالصمد إدريس)	BN (UMNO)	Uncontested
6th	P089	1982–1986	Rais Yatim (رئيس يتيم)	BN (UMNO)	22,279; 75.70%
7th	P103	1986–1990	Rais Yatim (رئيس يتيم)	BN (UMNO)	16,137; 77.43%
8th	P103	1990–1995	Ibrahim Salleh (إبراهيم صالح)	BN (UMNO)	13,175; 50.76%
9th	P113	1995–1999	Yunus Rahmat (يونس رحمات)	BN (UMNO)	14,650; 55.58%
10th	P113	1999–2004	Rais Yatim (رئيس يتيم)	BN (UMNO)	17,028; 63.21%
11th	P126	2004–2008	Rais Yatim (رئيس يتيم)	BN (UMNO)	20,650; 77.87%
12th	P126	2008–2013	Rais Yatim (رئيس يتيم)	BN (UMNO)	19,737; 70.83%
13th	P126	2013–2018	Zainudin Ismail (زين الدين إسماعيل)	BN (UMNO)	22,114; 59.56%
13th	P126	2018	Vacant (Note: Seat vacant from 5 December 2017 until the 2018 Malaysian general election due to the incumbent died in office. No by-election was held due to the next general election was less than half a year away.)		
14th	P126	2018–2022	Jalaluddin Alias (جلال الدين ألياس)	BN (UMNO)	19,062; 48.93%
15th	P126	2022–present	Jalaluddin Alias (جلال الدين ألياس)	BN (UMNO)	21,805; 48.10%

=== State constituency ===
Parliamentary constituency	State constituency						
Parliamentary constituency	1955–59*	1959–1974	1974–1986	1986–1995	1995–2004	2004–2018	2018–present
Jelebu			Bahau				
Jelebu					Chennah		
Jelebu			Jempol				
Jelebu				Klawang			
Jelebu			Kuala Klawang				
Jelebu				Peradong			
Jelebu			Pertang				
Jelebu				Sungai Lui			

=== Historical boundaries ===
State Constituency	Area				
State Constituency	1974	1984	1994	2003	2018
Bahau	Air Hitam; Bahau; FELDA Pasoh 2 & 3; Kampung Serting Tengah; Sungai Lui				
Chennah			Chennah; Kampung Mentaus; Simpang Durian; Sungai Muntoh; Titi		
Jempol	Batu Kikir; Juasseh; Kampung Majau; Kampung Terentang; Taman Intan				
Klawang		Kampung Amar Penghulu; Kampung Gedang; Kampung Ulu Seperi; Klawang; Peradong	Ladang Jelebu; Kampung Amar Penghulu; Kampung Gedang; Klawang; Peradong		
Kuala Klawang	Chennah; Kampung Orang Asli Esok; Klawang; Sungai Mentoh; Titi				
Peradong		Chennah; Kampung Orang Asli Esok; Kampung Simpang Gelami; Sungai Mentoh; Titi			
Pertang	FELDA Pasoh 1 & 4; Kampung Lakai; Kampung Simpang Gelami; Simpang Durian; Simpang Pertang	FELDA Pasoh 1 & 4; Kampung Lakai; Kampung Petaseh; Simpang Durian; Simpang Pertang	FELDA Pasoh 1; FELDA Pasoh 4; Kampung Lakai; Kampung Petaseh Hulu; Simpang Pertang		
Sungai Lui		Air Hitam; FELDA Pasoh 2; FELDA Pasoh 3; Kampung Lui Muda; Sungai Lui			

=== Current state assembly members ===
No.	State Constituency	Member	Coalition (Party)
N01	Chennah	John Siow Kong Choon	BN (MCA)
N02	Pertang	Jalaluddin Alias	BN (UMNO)
N03	Sungai Lui	Mohd Razi Mohd Ali	BN (UMNO)
N04	Klawang	Danni Rais	PN (WAWASAN)

=== Local governments & postcodes ===
No.	State Constituency	Local Government	Postcode
N01	Chennah	Jelebu District Council	71600, 71650 Kuala Klawang; 72120 Bandar Seri Jempol; 72200 Batu Kikir; 72300 Simpang Pertang; 72400 Simpang Durian
N02	Pertang	Jelebu District Council	71600, 71650 Kuala Klawang; 72120 Bandar Seri Jempol; 72200 Batu Kikir; 72300 Simpang Pertang; 72400 Simpang Durian
N03	Sungai Lui	Jempol Municipal Council	71600, 71650 Kuala Klawang; 72120 Bandar Seri Jempol; 72200 Batu Kikir; 72300 Simpang Pertang; 72400 Simpang Durian
N04	Klawang	Jelebu District Council	71600, 71650 Kuala Klawang; 72120 Bandar Seri Jempol; 72200 Batu Kikir; 72300 Simpang Pertang; 72400 Simpang Durian

== Election results ==
Malaysian general election, 2022
Party	Candidate	Votes	%	∆%
BN	Jalaluddin Alias	21,805	48.10	▼0.83
PH	Zulkefly Mohamad Omar	13,680	30.18	▲30.18
PN	Zaharuddon Baba Samon	9,596	21.17	▲21.17
PEJUANG	Ahmad Fakri Abu Samah	253	0.56	▲0.56
Total valid votes		45,334	100.00	
Total rejected ballots		573		
Unreturned ballots		101		
Turnout		46,008	75.11	▼6.78
Registered electors		59,561		
Majority		8,125	17.92	▲12.67
BN hold		Swing		
Source(s) https://lom.agc.gov.my/ilims/upload/portal/akta/outputp/1753263/PUB615%20PARLIMEN%20NEGERI%20SEMBILAN.pdf

Malaysian general election, 2018
Party	Candidate	Votes	%	∆%
BN	Jalaluddin Alias	19,062	48.93	▼10.63
PKR	Mustafar Ab Kadir	17,017	43.68	▲43.68
PAS	Norman Ipin	2,878	7.39	▼33.05
Total valid votes		38,957	100.00	
Total rejected ballots		586		
Unreturned ballots		190		
Turnout		39,733	81.89	▼2.72
Registered electors		48,522		
Majority		2,045	5.25	▼13.87
BN hold		Swing		
Source(s) "His Majesty's Government Gazette - Notice of Contested Election, Parliament for the State of Negeri Sembilan [P.U. (B) 242/2018]" (PDF). Attorney General's Chambers of Malaysia. 3 May 2018. "Federal Government Gazette - Results of Contested Election and Statements of the Poll after the Official Addition of Votes, Parliamentary Constituencies for the State of Negeri Sembilan [P.U. (B) 316/2018]" (PDF). Attorney General's Chambers of Malaysia. 28 May 2018.

Malaysian general election, 2013
Party	Candidate	Votes	%	∆%
BN	Zainudin Ismail	22,114	59.56	▼11.27
PAS	Raj Munni Sabu @ Aiman Athirah Al Jundi	15,013	40.44	▲11.27
Total valid votes		37,127	100.00	
Total rejected ballots		756		
Unreturned ballots		137		
Turnout		38,020	84.61	▲9.56
Registered electors		44,937		
Majority		7,101	19.12	▼22.54
BN hold		Swing		
Source(s) "Federal Government Gazette - Notice of Contested Election, Parliament for the State of Negeri Sembilan [P.U. (B) 179/2013]" (PDF). Attorney General's Chambers of Malaysia. 26 April 2013. Archived from the original (PDF) on 2019-12-29. "Federal Government Gazette - Results of Contested Election and Statements of the Poll after the Official Addition of Votes, Parliamentary Constituencies for the State of Negeri Sembilan [P.U. (B) 220/2013]" (PDF). Attorney General's Chambers of Malaysia. 22 May 2013.

Malaysian general election, 2008
Party	Candidate	Votes	%	∆%
BN	Rais Yatim	19,737	70.83	▼7.04
PAS	Norman Ipin	8,127	29.17	▲7.04
Total valid votes		27,864	100.00	
Total rejected ballots		769		
Unreturned ballots		396		
Turnout		29,029	75.05	▲2.22
Registered electors		38,682		
Majority		11,610	41.66	▼14.08
BN hold		Swing		

Malaysian general election, 2004
Party	Candidate	Votes	%	∆%
BN	Rais Yatim	20,650	77.87	▲14.66
PAS	Rosli Yaakop	5,870	22.13	▲22.13
Total valid votes		26,520	100.00	
Total rejected ballots		860		
Unreturned ballots		90		
Turnout		27,470	72.83	▼2.82
Registered electors		37,716		
Majority		14,780	55.74	▲29.32
BN hold		Swing		

Malaysian general election, 1999
Party	Candidate	Votes	%	∆%
BN	Rais Yatim	17,028	63.21	▲7.63
PKR	Jaafar Muhammad	9,909	36.79	▲36.79
Total valid votes		26,937	100.00	
Total rejected ballots		677		
Unreturned ballots		622		
Turnout		28,236	75.65	▼1.69
Registered electors		37,322		
Majority		7,119	26.42	▲15.26
BN hold		Swing		

Malaysian general election, 1995
Party	Candidate	Votes	%	∆%
BN	Yunus Rahmat	14,650	55.58	▲4.82
S46	Rais Yatim	11,710	44.42	▼4.82
Total valid votes		26,360	100.00	
Total rejected ballots		1,107		
Unreturned ballots		363		
Turnout		27,830	77.34	▼2.69
Registered electors		35,984		
Majority		2,940	11.16	▲9.64
BN hold		Swing		

Malaysian general election, 1990
Party	Candidate	Votes	%	∆%
BN	Ibrahim Sareh	13,175	50.76	▼26.67
S46	Rais Yatim	12,780	49.24	▲49.24
Total valid votes		25,955	100.00	
Total rejected ballots		682		
Unreturned ballots		0		
Turnout		26,637	80.03	▲4.01
Registered electors		33,282		
Majority		395	1.52	▼53.34
BN hold		Swing		

Malaysian general election, 1986
Party	Candidate	Votes	%	∆%
BN	Rais Yatim	16,137	77.43	▲1.73
PAS	Ishak Md Nazir	4,705	22.57	▲16.88
Total valid votes		20,842	100.00	
Total rejected ballots		870		
Unreturned ballots		0		
Turnout		21,712	76.02	▼2.17
Registered electors		28,561		
Majority		11,432	54.86	▼2.23
BN hold		Swing		

Malaysian general election, 1982
Party	Candidate	Votes	%	∆%
BN	Rais Yatim	22,279	75.70	▲75.70
DAP	Yap Sen Koong	5,477	18.61	▲18.61
PAS	Raja Aziz Raja Karim	1,675	5.69	▲5.69
Total valid votes		29,431	100.00	
Total rejected ballots		854		
Unreturned ballots		0		
Turnout		30,285	78.19	
Registered electors		38,733		
Majority		16,802	57.09	
BN hold		Swing		

Malaysian general election, 1978
Party	Candidate	Votes	%	∆%
On the nomination day, Abdul Samad Idris won uncontested.
BN	Abdul Samad Idris			
Total valid votes			100.00	
Total rejected ballots				
Unreturned ballots				
Turnout				
Registered electors				
Majority				
BN hold		Swing		

Malaysian general election, 1974
Party	Candidate	Votes	%
BN	Rais Yatim	14,138	73.15
DAP	Abdul Muluk Daud	3,576	18.50
Independent	Zainal Abidin Bador	1,614	8.35
Total valid votes		19,328	100.00
Total rejected ballots		1,596	
Unreturned ballots		0	
Turnout		20,924	82.02
Registered electors		24,690	
Majority		10,562	54.65
This was a new constituency created.
