= Rasah (federal constituency) =

Constituency of Negeri Sembilan, Malaysia

Rasah (P130)
Negeri Sembilan constituency

Federal constituency
- Legislature: Dewan Rakyat
- MP: Cha Kee Chin; PH
- Constituency created: 1984
- First contested: 1986
- Last contested: 2022

Demographics
- Population (2020): 256,585
- Electors (2023): 158,131
- Area (km²): 234
- Pop. density (per km²): 1,096.5

Rasah is a federal constituency in Seremban District, Negeri Sembilan, Malaysia, that has been represented in the Dewan Rakyat since 1986.

The federal constituency was created in the 1984 redistribution and is mandated to return a single member to the Dewan Rakyat under the first past the post voting system.

== Demographics ==
Ethnic breakdown of Rasah's electorate as of 2022
1. Chinese (34.4%)
2. Malay (40.9%)
3. Indian (22.3%)
4. Other ethnicities (2.40%)

As of 2020, Rasah has a population of 256,585 people.

Age breakdown of Rasah's electorate as of 2022
1. 18-20 7.01 (6.65%)
2. 21-29 22.13 (21.0%)
3. 30-39 20.39 (19.3%)
4. 40-49 16.85 (16.0%)
5. 50-59 15.23 (14.4%)
6. 60-69 13.36 (12.7%)
7. 70-79 6.48 (6.15%)
8. 80-89 3.32 (3.15%)
9. above 90 0.68 (0.64%)
Gender breakdown of Rasah's electorate as of 2022
1. Male (49.4%)
2. Female (50.6%)

== History ==
=== Polling districts ===
According to the federal gazette issued on 23 July 2026, the Rasah constituency is divided into 35 polling districts.

State constituency	Polling district	Code	Location
Labu (N20)	Jijan	130/20/01	SJK (T) Ladang Kubang; SK Desa Cempaka; SJK (T) Desa Cempaka; SK Kompleks KLIA; SMK Bandar Enstek; SMK Kompleks KLIA
Labu (N20)	Kampung Kondok	130/20/02	SK Dato' Ahmad Syah Bandar Abu Bakar Labu Hilir
Labu (N20)	Tiroi	130/20/03	SJK (C) Kampung Baru Batu 8 Labu; SK Labu Ulu
Labu (N20)	Labu	130/20/04	SK Labu; SJK (C) Min Shing
Labu (N20)	Labu Jaya	130/20/05	SK L.B Johnson Seremban
Labu (N20)	Kampong Gadong Jaya	130/20/06	SK Gadong Jaya Labu
Bukit Kepayang (N21)	Bukit Kepayang	130/21/01	SJK (C) Hillside; SMJK Chan Wa II; Dewan Orang Ramai Dato' Shahrdin Batu 8
Bukit Kepayang (N21)	Taman Permai	130/21/02	SMK Puteri Seremban; Kompleks Jabatan Kebudayaan dan Kesenian Negara; SK Puteri
Bukit Kepayang (N21)	Jalan Kong Sang	130/21/03	SJK (C) San Min Jalan Lee Sam Seremban
Bukit Kepayang (N21)	Jalan Dato Bandar Tunggal	130/21/04	SMK Methodist (A.C.S) Seremban
Bukit Kepayang (N21)	Jalan Yam Tuan	130/21/05	SJK (T) Lorong Jawa Seremban
Bukit Kepayang (N21)	Jalan Lee Sam	130/21/06	SK Methodist (ACS) Seremban
Bukit Kepayang (N21)	Jalan Tuanku Munawir	130/21/07	SJK (C) Sino English
Bukit Kepayang (N21)	Bukit Tembok	130/21/08	Sekolah Methodist Wesley Seremban
Bukit Kepayang (N21)	Taman Bukit Kaya	130/21/09	SK St Paul Seremban
Bukit Kepayang (N21)	Seremban 2	130/21/10	SK Seremban 2A; SK Seremban 2B; SJK (C) Tung Hua; SK Wwasan; SMK Bukit Kepayang; Dewan Komuniti Mantau; Dewan Taman Rimbun Harapan
Rahang (N22)	Rahang	130/22/01	SK Rahang
Rahang (N22)	Rahang Timor	130/22/02	Pejabat RISDA Daerah Rahang
Rahang (N22)	Pekan Rahang	130/22/03	Balai Raya Kg. Semarak
Rahang (N22)	Pekan Rasah	130/22/04	SMK King George V
Rahang (N22)	Kampong Bahru Rasah	130/22/05	SJK (C) Ma Hwa Kg. Baru Rasah
Rahang (N22)	Taman Bukit Chedang	130/22/06	Dewan Badminton, Kompleks Sukan Tan Sri Dato' Dr Hj Mohd Said, Seremban 2
Rahang (N22)	Kampong Pondok	130/22/07	Balai Raya Kg. Baru Rasah
Rahang (N22)	Jalan Tok Ungku	130/22/08	SMK Bukit Mewah
Rahang (N22)	Kampong Datok Mansor	130/22/09	SK Dato' Bandar Rasah
Mambau (N23)	Desa Seri Mambau	130/23/01	Balai Raya Kampung Batu 3 Mambau; SJK (C) Kg Baru Mambau
Mambau (N23)	Taman Sungai Ujong	130/23/02	SMK Seremban 3
Mambau (N23)	Pekan Mambau	130/23/03	Balai Raya Kg. Sri Mantau
Mambau (N23)	Rasah Jaya	130/23/04	SK Taman Rasah Jaya; UITM Cawangan Negeri Sembilan
Mambau (N23)	Bukit Blossom	130/23/05	SJK (C) Sin Hua; SJK (C) Kelpin
Seremban Jaya (N24)	Taman Rahang	130/24/01	Kolej Tingkatan Enam Tuanku Muhriz
Seremban Jaya (N24)	Taman Seremban	130/24/02	SJK (C) Forest Heights
Seremban Jaya (N24)	Kampong Bahru Rahang	130/24/03	SJK (C) Kg Baru Rahang
Seremban Jaya (N24)	Senawang	130/24/04	SK Taman Sri Mawar
Seremban Jaya (N24)	Taman Seremban Jaya	130/24/05	SK Seremban Jaya; SMK Seremban Jaya; SJK (C) Sungai Salak; SK Seremban Jaya 2; Dewan Orang Ramai Taman Seremban Jaya

=== Representation history ===
Members of Parliament for Rasah
Parliament	No	Years	Member	Party	Vote Share
Constituency recreated from Telok Kemang, Mantin and Seremban
7th	P108	1986–1990	Hu Sepang (胡雪邦)	DAP	21,139; 51.80%
8th	P108	1990–1995	Wong See Wah (黄思华)	BN (MCA)	25,872; 53.12%
9th	P118	1995–1999	Wong See Wah (黄思华)	BN (MCA)	30,946; 59.83%
10th	P118	1999–2004	Goh Siow Huat (吴绍阀)	BN (MCA)	28,641; 51.24%
11th	P130	2004–2008	Goh Siow Huat (吴绍阀)	BN (MCA)	25,009; 55.02%
12th	P130	2008–2013	Anthony Loke Siew Fook (陆兆福)	PR (DAP)	34,721; 61.87%
13th	P130	2013–2015	Teo Kok Seong (张聒翔)	PR (DAP)	48,964; 65.77%
13th	P130	2015–2018	Teo Kok Seong (张聒翔)	PH (DAP)	48,964; 65.77%
14th	P130	2018–2022	Cha Kee Chin (谢琪清)	PH (DAP)	61,806; 72.45%
15th	P130	2022–present	Cha Kee Chin (谢琪清)	PH (DAP)	81,434; 68.04%

=== State constituency ===
Parliamentary constituency	State constituency						
Parliamentary constituency	1955–59*	1959–1974	1974–1986	1986–1995	1995–2004	2004–2018	2018–present
Rasah						Bukit Kepayang	
Rasah				Jimah			
Rasah				Labu			
Rasah				Mambau			
Rasah					Rahang		
Rasah				Rantau			
Rasah						Senawang	
Rasah							Seremban Jaya
Rasah					Temiang		

=== Historical boundaries ===
State Constituency	Area			
State Constituency	1984	1994	2003	2018
Bukit Kepayang			Bandar Ainsdale; Bukit Tembok; Kampung Orang Asli Sebair; Seremban 2; Taman Rimbun Kiara	Bandar Ainsdale; Bukit Tembok; Kampung Orang Asli Sebair; Rasah Kemayan; Seremban 2
Jimah	Bukit Pelanduk; Chuah; Jimah; Lukut; Sungai Nipah			
Labu	Bandar Ainsdale; Enstek; Gadong; Kota Sieramas; Labu	Enstek; Gadong; Kampung Tekir; Kota Sieramas; Labu		
Mambu	Lobak; Mambau; Rasah; Seremban 2; Seremban 3	Mambau; Rasah Kemayan; Seremban 3; Taman Bukit Emas; Taman Rasah Jaya	Mambau; Rasah Kemayan; Seremban 3; Taman Patin Indah; Taman Rasah Jaya	Mambau; Seremban 3; Taman Nuri Indah; Taman Patin Indah; Taman Rasah Jaya
Rahang		Kampung Baru Rasah; Kampung Dato' Mansur; Kampung Pasir; Rahang; Taman Happy	Kampung Datuk Mansor; Kampung Pasir; Rahang; Taman Bukit Chedang; Taman Happy	
Rantau	Kampung Kanchong; Pinggiran Senawang; Rantau; Silau; Sungai Gadut	Kampung Kanchong; Nusari Bayu; Rantau; Sendayan; Silau		
Senawang			Kampung Baru Rahang; Seremban Jaya; Taman Bidara; Taman Bukit Emas; Taman Seremban	
Seremban Jaya				Forest Heights; Kampung Baru Rahang; Seremban Jaya; Taman Bidara; Taman Bukit Emas
Temiang		Bandar Ainsdale; Kampung Orang Asli Belihoi; Lobak; Temiang; Seremban 2		

=== Current state assembly members ===
No.	State Constituency	Member	Coalition (Party)
N20	Labu	Siti Nur Umaira Hasim	BN (UMNO)
N21	Bukit Kepayang	Nicole Tan Lee Koon	PH (DAP)
N22	Rahang	Desmond Siau Meow Kong	PH (DAP)
N23	Mambau	Lee Kai Yet	PH (DAP)
N24	Seremban Jaya	Mugunthan Subramanian	PH (DAP)

=== Local governments & postcodes ===
No.	State Constituency	Local Government	Postcode
N20	Labu	Seremban City Council	70000, 70100, 70200, 70300, 70450, 70500, 70502, 70506, 71450 Seremban; 71760 Bandar Enstek; 71800 Nilai; 71900 Labu
N21	Bukit Kepayang	Seremban City Council	70000, 70100, 70200, 70300, 70450, 70500, 70502, 70506, 71450 Seremban; 71760 Bandar Enstek; 71800 Nilai; 71900 Labu
N22	Rahang	Seremban City Council	70000, 70100, 70200, 70300, 70450, 70500, 70502, 70506, 71450 Seremban; 71760 Bandar Enstek; 71800 Nilai; 71900 Labu
N23	Mambau	Seremban City Council	70000, 70100, 70200, 70300, 70450, 70500, 70502, 70506, 71450 Seremban; 71760 Bandar Enstek; 71800 Nilai; 71900 Labu
N24	Seremban Jaya	Seremban City Council	70000, 70100, 70200, 70300, 70450, 70500, 70502, 70506, 71450 Seremban; 71760 Bandar Enstek; 71800 Nilai; 71900 Labu

== Election results ==
Malaysian general election, 2022
Party	Candidate	Votes	%	∆%
PH	Cha Kee Chin	81,434	68.04	▲68.04
BN	Ng Kian Nam	19,447	16.25	▼1.26
PN	David Chong Vee Hing	18,810	15.72	▲15.72
Total valid votes		119,691	100.00	
Total rejected ballots		903		
Unreturned ballots		334		
Turnout		120,928	76.78	▼7.48
Registered electors		155,896		
Majority		61,987	51.79	▼3.15
PH hold		Swing		
Source(s) https://lom.agc.gov.my/ilims/upload/portal/akta/outputp/1753263/PUB615%20PARLIMEN%20NEGERI%20SEMBILAN.pdf

Malaysian general election, 2018
Party	Candidate	Votes	%	∆%
PKR	Cha Kee Chin	61,806	72.45	▲72.45
BN	Ng Kian Nam	14,939	17.51	▼16.72
PAS	Khairil Annuar Wafa	8,260	9.68	▲9.68
People's Alternative Party	David Dass	302	0.36	▲0.36
Total valid votes		85,307	100.00	
Total rejected ballots		1,045		
Unreturned ballots		303		
Turnout		86,655	84.26	▼1.55
Registered electors		102,838		
Majority		46,867	54.94	▲23.40
PKR hold		Swing		
Source(s) "His Majesty's Government Gazette - Notice of Contested Election, Parliament for the State of Negeri Sembilan [P.U. (B) 242/2018]" (PDF). Attorney General's Chambers of Malaysia. 3 May 2018. "Federal Government Gazette - Results of Contested Election and Statements of the Poll after the Official Addition of Votes, Parliamentary Constituencies for the State of Negeri Sembilan [P.U. (B) 316/2018]" (PDF). Attorney General's Chambers of Malaysia. 28 May 2018.

Malaysian general election, 2013
Party	Candidate	Votes	%	∆%
DAP	Teo Kok Seong	48,964	65.77	▲3.90
BN	Teo Eng Kian	25,479	34.23	▼3.90
Total valid votes		74,443	100.00	
Total rejected ballots		1,208		
Unreturned ballots		209		
Turnout		75,860	85.81	▲7.25
Registered electors		88,403		
Majority		23,485	31.54	▲7.80
DAP hold		Swing		
Source(s) "Federal Government Gazette - Notice of Contested Election, Parliament for the State of Negeri Sembilan [P.U. (B) 179/2013]" (PDF). Attorney General's Chambers of Malaysia. 26 April 2013. Archived from the original (PDF) on 2019-12-29. "Federal Government Gazette - Results of Contested Election and Statements of the Poll after the Official Addition of Votes, Parliamentary Constituencies for the State of Negeri Sembilan [P.U. (B) 220/2013]" (PDF). Attorney General's Chambers of Malaysia. 22 May 2013.

Malaysian general election, 2008
Party	Candidate	Votes	%	∆%
DAP	Loke Siew Fook	34,271	61.87	▲16.89
BN	Yeow Chai Thiam	21,120	38.13	▼16.89
Total valid votes		55,391	100.00	
Total rejected ballots		1,261		
Unreturned ballots		2		
Turnout		56,654	78.56	▲4.80
Registered electors		72,115		
Majority		13,151	23.74	▲13.70
DAP gain from BN		Swing		?

Malaysian general election, 2004
Party	Candidate	Votes	%	∆%
BN	Goh Siow Huat	25,009	55.02	▲3.78
DAP	Chan Su Sann	20,446	44.98	▼3.78
Total valid votes		45,455	100.00	
Total rejected ballots		1,294		
Unreturned ballots		1,306		
Turnout		48,055	73.76	▲0.32
Registered electors		65,152		
Majority		4,563	10.04	▲7.56
BN hold		Swing		

Malaysian general election, 1999
Party	Candidate	Votes	%	∆%
BN	Goh Siow Huat	28,641	51.24	▼8.59
DAP	Chen Man Hin	27,255	48.76	▲8.59
Total valid votes		55,896	100.00	
Total rejected ballots		1,825		
Unreturned ballots		638		
Turnout		58,359	73.44	▼0.09
Registered electors		79,464		
Majority		1,386	2.48	▼17.18
BN hold		Swing		

Malaysian general election, 1995
Party	Candidate	Votes	%	∆%
BN	Wong See Wah	30,946	59.83	▲6.71
DAP	Chen Man Hin	20,775	40.17	▼6.71
Total valid votes		51,721	100.00	
Total rejected ballots		1,525		
Unreturned ballots		486		
Turnout		53,732	73.53	▼1.78
Registered electors		73,076		
Majority		10,171	19.66	▲13.42
BN hold		Swing		

Malaysian general election, 1990
Party	Candidate	Votes	%	∆%
BN	Wong See Wah	25,872	53.12	▲4.92
DAP	Hu Sepang	22,836	46.88	▼4.92
Total valid votes		48,708	100.00	
Total rejected ballots		1,489		
Unreturned ballots		0		
Turnout		50,197	75.31	▲1.02
Registered electors		66,654		
Majority		3,036	6.24	▲2.64
BN gain from DAP		Swing		?

Malaysian general election, 1986
Party	Candidate	Votes	%
DAP	Hu Sepang	21,139	51.80
BN	Wong Seng Chow	19,668	48.20
Total valid votes		40,807	100.00
Total rejected ballots		1,184	
Unreturned ballots		0	
Turnout		41,991	74.29
Registered electors		56,521	
Majority		1,471	3.60
This was a new constituency created.
