= Zainudin Ismail =

Malaysian politician (1961–2017)

Yang Berbahagia Dato' Zainudin Ismail DPNS
- زين الدين إسماعيل

Member of the Malaysian Parliament for Jelebu
- In office 5 May 2013 – 5 December 2017
- Preceded by: Rais Yatim (BN–UMNO)
- Succeeded by: Jalaluddin Alias (BN–UMNO)
- Majority: 7,101 (2013)

Personal details
- Born: 19 November 1961 Kampung Petaseh, Jelebu, Negeri Sembilan
- Died: 5 December 2017 (aged 56) Kondo Villa Puteri, Kuala Lumpur
- Cause of death: Brain tumor
- Resting place: Kampung Petaseh, Kuala Klawang
- Party: United Malays National Organisation (UMNO)
- Other political affiliations: Barisan Nasional (BN)
- Spouse: Ruziah Yaacob
- Occupation: Politician

Zainudin bin Haji Ismail (19 November 1961 – 5 December 2017) was a Malaysian politician from Negeri Sembilan. He was a Member of Parliament for Jelebu from May 2013 to December 2017 representing the Barisan Nasional (BN) from United Malays National Organisation (UMNO).

== Death ==
He died on 5 December 2017 at the age of 56 due to a brain tumor.

Due to he died less than two years before Parliament was dissolved, the Election Commission of Malaysia did not hold a by-election to fill the vacant seat.

== Election results ==
Parliament of Malaysia
Year	Constituency	Candidate	Votes	Pct	Opponent(s)	Votes	Pct	Ballots cast	Majority	Turnout
2013	P126 Jelebu	Zainuddin Ismail (UMNO)	22,114	59.56%	Raj Munni Sabu (PAS)	15,013	40.44%	37,127	7,101	84.61%

== Honours ==
- Negeri Sembilan
  - Knight Commander of the Order of Loyalty to Negeri Sembilan (DPNS) – Dato' (2015)
