= Napsiah Omar =

Malaysian educator and politician

Yang Berbahagia Tan Sri Dato' Napsiah Omar PSM DSNS

Minister of National Unity and Community Development
- In office 27 October 1990 – 7 May 1995
- Monarchs: Azlan Shah; Ja’afar
- Prime Minister: Mahathir Mohamad
- Deputy: Alexander Lee Yu Lung
- Preceded by: Portfolio Established
- Succeeded by: Zaleha Ismail
- Constituency: Kuala Pilah

Minister of Public Enterprises
- In office 20 May 1987 – 26 October 1990
- Monarchs: Iskandar; Azlan Shah
- Prime Minister: Mahathir Mohamad
- Deputy: Daud Taha
- Preceded by: Rafidah Aziz
- Succeeded by: Mohamed Yusof Mohamed Noor
- Constituency: Kuala Pilah

Member of the Malaysian Parliament for Kuala Pilah
- In office 29 November 1999 – 21 March 2004
- Preceded by: Abu Zahar Ujang (BN–UMNO)
- Succeeded by: Hasan Malek (BN–UMNO)
- Majority: 2,818 (1999)
- In office 22 April 1982 – 25 April 1995
- Preceded by: Mansor Othman (BN–UMNO)
- Succeeded by: Abu Zahar Ujang (BN–UMNO
- Majority: 15,195 (1982); 14,941 (1986); 11,906 (1990)

Member of the Negeri Sembilan State Legislative Assembly for Pilah
- In office 25 April 1995 – 29 November 1999
- Preceded by: Abu Zahar Ujang (BN–UMNO)
- Succeeded by: Norhayati Omar (BN–UMNO)
- Majority: 4,549 (1995)

Personal details
- Born: Napsiah binti Omar; 21 April 1943 Kuala Pilah, Negeri Sembilan, Japanese occupation of Malaya (now Malaysia)
- Died: 16 April 2018 (aged 74) Ampang Jaya, Selangor, Malaysia
- Resting place: Kampung Jawa Muslim Cemetery, Kuala Pilah, Negeri Sembilan
- Citizenship: Malaysian
- Party: United Malays National Organisation (UMNO)
- Other political affiliations: Barisan Nasional (BN)
- Education: Australian National University; Cornell University
- Occupation: Politician
- Profession: Academic

Napsiah binti Omar (21 April 1943 – 16 April 2018) was a Malaysian educator and politician.

The daughter of United Malays National Organisation (UMNO) activists, Napsiah was born in Negeri Sembilan. She studied zoology and botany at the Australian National University and received a BSc in nutrition and education from Cornell University. From 1969 to 1982, Napsiah taught at the Universiti Pertanian Malaysia, becoming associate professor and head of the Department of Human Studies.

In 1972, she joined the local branch of the UMNO. She was elected to the Dewan Rakyat representing the constituency of Kuala Pilah (1982-1995; 1999–2004) and was named Deputy Minister of Housing and Local Government. She became divisional head of Wanita UMNO (the women's wing) and was also named to its national executive council. In 1987, she was named Minister of Public Enterprises. In 1990, she was elected deputy leader for Wanita UMNO. Later that year, she became Minister of National Unity and Social Development. In 1995 general election, she did not run for reelection to the parliamentary seat but instead was elected to the Negeri Sembilan State Legislative Assembly of Pilah seat and served as the State Minister for Public Works. In 1999 general election, she contested again the Kuala Pilah parliamentary seat and won for another one term.

Napsiah died on 16 April 2018 at the age of 74 due to liver cancer. She was buried at the Kampung Jawa Muslim Cemetery in Kuala Pilah.

== Election results ==
Negeri Sembilan State Legislative Assembly
Year	Constituency	Candidate	Votes	Pct	Opponent(s)	Votes	Pct	Ballots cast	Majority	Turnout
1995	N16 Pilah	Napsiah Omar (UMNO)	5,727	80.33%	Azizuddin Ishak (S46)	1,178	16.52%	7,129	4,549	67.88%

Parliament of Malaysia
Year	Constituency	Candidate	Votes	Pct	Opponent(s)	Votes	Pct	Ballots cast	Majority	Turnout
1982	P092 Kuala Pilah	Napsiah Omar (UMNO)	19,206	82.72%	Othman Hamzah (PAS)	4,011	17.28%	24,395	15,195	74.62%
1986	P106 Kuala Pilah	Napsiah Omar (UMNO)	19,400	81.31%	Mansoor Keliwan (PAS)	4,459	18.69%	25,076	14,941	70.77%
1990	P106 Kuala Pilah	Napsiah Omar (UMNO)	19,444	72.06%	Abd Halim Mohd (S46)	7,538	27.94%	27,267	11,906	72.75%
1999	P116 Kuala Pilah	Napsiah Omar (UMNO)	16,494	54.67%	Ruslan Kasim (KeADILan)	13,676	45.33%	31,232	2,818	71.14%

== Honours ==
=== Honours of Malaysia ===
- Malaysia
  - Commander of the Order of Loyalty to the Crown of Malaysia (PSM) – Tan Sri (2007)
- Negeri Sembilan
  - Knight Companion of the Order of Loyalty to Negeri Sembilan (DSNS) – Dato' (1987)
