= Noorzunita Begum Mohd Ibrahim =

Malaysian politician

Yang Berbahagia Dato' Noorzunita Begum Mohd Ibrahim DPNS ANS
- نورزونيتا بيڬوم محمّد إبراهيم

Member of the Negeri Sembilan State Executive Council
- In office 24 August 2023 – 2 August 2026
- Menteri Besar: Aminuddin Harun
- Portfolio: Women, Family and Society
- Preceded by: Nicole Tan Lee Koon
- Constituency: Pilah

Member of the Negeri Sembilan State Legislative Assembly for Pilah
- In office 12 August 2023 – 1 August 2026
- Preceded by: Mohamad Nazaruddin Sabtu (PH–PKR)
- Majority: 1,079 (2023)

State Women Chief of Negeri Sembilan of the People's Justice Party
- In office 2 September 2022 – 23 May 2025
- Preceded by: Amni Idris
- Succeeded by: Rosmawaty Muhamad Ros

Personal details
- Born: Noorzunita Begum binti Mohd Ibrahim
- Party: People's Justice Party (PKR)
- Other political affiliations: Pakatan Harapan (PH)
- Occupation: Politician

Noorzunita Begum binti Mohd Ibrahim is a Malaysian politician who served as Member of the Negeri Sembilan State Executive Council (EXCO) in the Pakatan Harapan (PH) state administration under Menteri Besar Aminuddin Harun since August 2023 as well as Member of the Negeri Sembilan State Legislative Assembly (MLA) for Pilah since August 2023. She is a member of the People's Justice Party (PKR), a component party of Pakatan Harapan (PH). She previously served as the State Women Chief of Negeri Sembilan of PKR from 2022 to 2025.

== Election results ==
Negeri Sembilan State Legislative Assembly
Year	Constituency	Candidate	Votes	Pct	Opponent(s)	Votes	Pct	Ballots cast	Majority	Turnout
2023	N18 Pilah	Noorzunita Begum Mohd Ibrahim (PKR)	6,222	54.75%	Rafiei Mustapha (PAS)	5,143	45.25%	11,493	1,079	64.96%
2026	N18 Pilah	Noorzunita Begum Mohd Ibrahim (PKR)	6,100	47.18%	S Leza Md Yasin (UMNO)	6,830	52.82	13,057	730	72.40%

== Honours ==
- Negeri Sembilan
  - Knight Commander of the Order of Loyalty to Negeri Sembilan (DPNS) – Dato' (2025)
  - Member of the Order of Loyalty to Negeri Sembilan (ANS) (2023)
