= Bahau (state constituency) =

State constituency in Negeri Sembilan, Malaysia

Bahau (N08)
Negeri Sembilan constituency

State constituency
- Legislature: Negeri Sembilan State Legislative Assembly
MLA
Teo Kok Seong
PH
- Constituency created: 1958
- First contested: 1959
- Last contested: 2026

Demographics
- Electors (2023): 25,769
- Area (km²): 48

N08 Bahau within Negeri Sembilan, as used for the 2023 and 2026 state elections

Bahau is a state constituency in Negeri Sembilan, Malaysia, that has been represented in the Negeri Sembilan State Legislative Assembly.

The state constituency was first contested in 1959 and is mandated to return a single Assemblyman to the Negeri Sembilan State Legislative Assembly under the first-past-the-post voting system.

== Demographics ==
Ethnic breakdown of Bahau's electorate as of 2026.
1. Chinese (58.0%)
2. Malay (30.4%)
3. Indian (10.8%)
4. Other ethnicities (0.90%)

== History ==
=== Polling districts ===
According to the gazette issued on 23 July 2026, the Bahau constituency has a total of 8 polling districts.

State constituency	Polling districts	Code	Location
Bahau (N08)	Kampong Bukit Perah	127/08/01	Dewan Orang Ramai Batu Kikir
Bahau (N08)	Kampong Batu Kikir	127/08/02	SMK Batu Kikir
Bahau (N08)	Kampong Lonek	127/08/03	Balai Raya Kampong Lonek
Bahau (N08)	Kuala Jempol	127/08/04	SK Jempol
Bahau (N08)	Kuala Kampung Kepis	127/08/05	SK Kuala Kepis
Bahau (N08)	Kampung Jambu Lapan	127/08/06	SMK Datuk Mansor
Bahau (N08)	Taman ACBE	127/08/07	SJK (C) Bahau
Bahau (N08)	Pekan Bahau	127/08/08	SK St Aidan
Bahau (N08)	Kampong Indah	127/08/09	SJK (C) Chi Wen
Bahau (N08)	Kampong Bakar Batu	127/08/10	SMK Bahau; SMJK Chi Wen

=== Representation history ===
Members of the Legislative Assembly for Bahau
Assembly	No	Years	Member	Party
Constituency created
1st	N19	1959–1964	Thong Hiang Kim (唐賢欽)	Alliance (MCA)
2nd	N19	1964–1969	Thong Hiang Kim (唐賢欽)	Alliance (MCA)
		1969–1971	Assembly was dissolved	
3rd	N19	1971–1974	Thong Hiang Kim (唐賢欽)	Alliance (MCA)
4th	N03	1974–1978	Thong Hiang Kim (唐賢欽)	BN (MCA)
5th	N03	1978–1982	Thong Hiang Kim (唐賢欽)	BN (MCA)
6th	N03	1982–1986	Chew Hock Thye (周福泰)	BN (MCA)
7th	N07	1986–1990	Loh Ming Chai (羅明仔)	DAP
8th	N07	1990–1995	Wong Zee Nyok (黃子育)	GR (DAP)
9th	N06	1995–1999	See Ah Kow (徐亞苟)	BN (MCA)
10th	N06	1999–2004	See Ah Kow (徐亞苟)	BN (MCA)
11th	N08	2004–2007	Lim Fui Ming (林輝明)	DAP
11th	N08	2007–2008	Lim Fui Ming (林輝明)	BN (MCA)
12th	N08	2008–2013	Teo Kok Seong (張聒翔)	PR (DAP)
13th	N08	2013–2015	Chew Seh Yong (周世揚)	PR (DAP)
13th	N08	2015–2018	Chew Seh Yong (周世揚)	PH (DAP)
14th	N08	2018–2023	Teo Kok Seong (張聒翔)	PH (DAP)
15th	N08	2023–2026	Teo Kok Seong (張聒翔)	PH (DAP)
16th	N08	2026–present	Teo Kok Seong (張聒翔)	PH (DAP)

== Election results ==
Negeri Sembilan state election, 2026
Party	Candidate	Votes	%	∆%
PH	Teo Kok Seong	9,995	59.91	▼16.61
BN	Chong Fui Ming	6,688	40.09	▲40.09
Total valid votes		16,683	100.00	
Total rejected ballots		181		
Unreturned ballots		19		
Turnout		16,883	65.00	▲4.45
Registered electors		25,972		
Majority		3,307	19.82	▼33.88
PH hold		Swing		

Negeri Sembilan state election, 2023
Party	Candidate	Votes	%	∆%
PH	Teo Kok Seong	11,939	76.52	▲76.52
PN	Kumar S Paramasivam	3,531	22.82	▲22.82
Total valid votes		15,602	100.00	
Total rejected ballots		132		
Unreturned ballots		15		
Turnout		15,602	60.55	▼20.56
Registered electors		25,769		
Majority		8,408	53.70	▲14.52
PH hold		Swing		

Negeri Sembilan state election, 2018
Party	Candidate	Votes	%	∆%
PKR	Teo Kok Seong	10,094	64.74	▲64.74
BN	Chong Wan Yu	3,985	25.56	▼7.16
PAS	Mustafar Bakri Abdul Aziz	1,512	9.70	▲9.70
Total valid votes		15,591	100.00	
Total rejected ballots		200		
Unreturned ballots		40		
Turnout		15,831	81.11	▼1.02
Registered electors		19,469		
Majority		6,109	39.18	▲4.62
PKR hold		Swing		

Negeri Sembilan state election, 2013
Party	Candidate	Votes	%	∆%
DAP	Chew Seh Yong	9,998	67.28	▲13.65
BN	Yee Mee Faa	4,862	32.72	▼32.72
Total valid votes		14,860	100.00	
Total rejected ballots		288		
Unreturned ballots		0		
Turnout		15,148	82.13	▲9.29
Registered electors		18,444		
Majority		5,136	34.56	▲27.30
DAP hold		Swing		
Source(s) "Federal Government Gazette - Notice of Contested Election, State Legislative Assembly for the State of Negeri Sembilan [P.U. (B) 193/2013]" (PDF). Attorney General's Chambers of Malaysia. 26 April 2013. "Federal Government Gazette - Results of Contested Election and Statements of the Poll after the Official Addition of Votes, State Constituencies for the State of Negeri Sembilan [P.U. (B) 234/2013]" (PDF). Attorney General's Chambers of Malaysia. 22 May 2013.

Negeri Sembilan state election, 2008
Party	Candidate	Votes	%	∆%
DAP	Teo Kok Seong	6,188	53.63	▲0.56
BN	Lim Fui Ming	5,351	46.37	▼0.56
Total valid votes		11,539	100.00	
Total rejected ballots		307		
Unreturned ballots		0		
Turnout		11,846	72.84	▲1.43
Registered electors		16,264		
Majority		837	7.26	▲1.09
DAP hold		Swing		

Negeri Sembilan state election, 2004
Party	Candidate	Votes	%	∆%
DAP	Lim Fui Ming	5,544	53.07	▲16.93
BN	See Ah Kow	4,902	46.93	▼16.93
Total valid votes		10,446	100.00	
Total rejected ballots		350		
Unreturned ballots		225		
Turnout		11,021	71.41	▲1.94
Registered electors		15,434		
Majority		642	6.15	▼21.56
DAP gain from BN		Swing		-

Negeri Sembilan state election, 1999
Party	Candidate	Votes	%	∆%
BN	See Ah Kow	6,549	63.86	▲7.82
DAP	Ho Chew Kuan	3,707	36.14	▼2.13
Total valid votes		10,256	100.00	
Total rejected ballots		336		
Unreturned ballots		0		
Turnout		10,592	69.46	▼3.58
Registered electors		15,248		
Majority		2,842	27.71	▲9.95
BN hold		Swing		

Negeri Sembilan state election, 1995
Party	Candidate	Votes	%	∆%
BN	See Ah Kow	5,644	56.03	▲13.68
DAP	Lim Fui Ming	3,855	38.27	▼19.38
Independent	Abdul Rashid Abas	508	5.04	▲5.04
Independent	Loo Ah Man @ Loh Ming Chai	66	0.66	▲0.66
Total valid votes		10,073	100.00	
Total rejected ballots		218		
Unreturned ballots		152		
Turnout		10,443	73.04	▼0.10
Registered electors		14,297		
Majority		1,789	17.76	▲2.47
BN gain from GR		Swing		-

Negeri Sembilan state election, 1990
Party	Candidate	Votes	%	∆%
DAP	Wong Zee Nyok	5,092	57.65	▲6.76
BN	Chong Chi Siong	3,741	42.35	▲8.76
Total valid votes		8,833	100.00	
Total rejected ballots		211		
Unreturned ballots		12		
Turnout		9,056	73.14	▼1.74
Registered electors		12,381		
Majority		1,351	15.29	▼2.01
GR gain from DAP		Swing		-

Negeri Sembilan state election, 1986
Party	Candidate	Votes	%	∆%
DAP	Loo Ah Man @ Loh Ming Chai	3,821	50.89	▲36.08
BN	Chong Chi Siong (Chong Fah)	2,522	33.59	▼41.35
Independent	Yew Chin Jeam (Yew Chin Chiew)	1,165	15.52	▲15.52
Total valid votes		7,508	100.00	
Total rejected ballots		228		
Unreturned ballots		0		
Turnout		7,736	74.88	▼0.48
Registered electors		10,331		
Majority		1,299	17.30	▼42.82
DAP gain from BN		Swing		-

Negeri Sembilan state election, 1982
Party	Candidate	Votes	%	∆%
BN	Chew Hock Thye	7,708	74.94	▼4.26
DAP	Loo Ah Man @ Loh Ming Chai	1,524	14.82	▼5.98
PAS	Raja Aziz Raja Karim	1,054	10.25	▲10.25
Total valid votes		10,286	100.00	
Total rejected ballots		56		
Unreturned ballots		0		
Turnout		10,342	75.36	▼0.48
Registered electors		13,723		
Majority		6,184	60.12	▲1.72
BN hold		Swing		

Negeri Sembilan state election, 1978
Party	Candidate	Votes	%	∆%
BN	Thong Hiang Kim	5,765	79.20	▼1.78
DAP	Loo Ah Man @ Loh Ming Chai	1,514	20.80	▲8.21
Total valid votes		7,279	100.00	
Total rejected ballots		244		
Unreturned ballots		0		
Turnout		7,523	75.84	▼3.76
Registered electors		9,919		
Majority		4,251	58.40	▼9.99
BN hold		Swing		

Negeri Sembilan state election, 1974
Party	Candidate	Votes	%	∆%
BN	Thong Hiang Kim	4,540	80.98	
DAP	Muhamad Janor Tahar	706	12.59	
Independent	Ad. Rahman Muhamad	360	6.42	
Total valid votes		5,606	100.00	
Total rejected ballots		209		
Unreturned ballots		0		
Turnout		5,815	79.60	▲79.60
Registered electors		7,305		
Majority		3,834	68.39	▲68.39
BN gain from Alliance		Swing		-

Negeri Sembilan state election, 1969
Party	Candidate	Votes	%	∆%
On the nomination day, Thong Hiang Kim won uncontested.
Alliance	Thong Hiang Kim			
Total valid votes				
Total rejected ballots				
Unreturned ballots				
Turnout				
Registered electors		7,086		
Majority				
Alliance hold		Swing		

Negeri Sembilan state election, 1964
Party	Candidate	Votes	%	∆%
Alliance	Thong Hiang Kim	2,890	63.21	▲13.21
Socialist Front	Tan Beng Soo	1,576	34.47	▼7.45
UDP	Noordin Kohat	106	2.32	▲2.32
Total valid votes		4,572	100.00	
Total rejected ballots		205		
Unreturned ballots		0		
Turnout		4,777	79.46	▼4.71
Registered electors		6,012		
Majority		1,314	28.74	▲20.66
Alliance hold		Swing		

Negeri Sembilan state election, 1959
Party	Candidate	Votes	%
Alliance	Thong Hiang Kim	1,529	50.00
Socialist Front	Chai Yau Foh	1,282	41.92
PMIP	Harun Yusof	247	8.08
Total valid votes		3,058	100.00
Total rejected ballots		99	
Unreturned ballots		0	
Turnout		3,157	84.16
Registered electors		3,751	
Majority		247	8.08
This was a new seat created.
