= Pilah =

Political subdivision in Malaysia

Pilah (N18)
Negeri Sembilan constituency

State constituency
- Legislature: Negeri Sembilan State Legislative Assembly
MLA
S Leza Md Yasin
BN
- Constituency created: 1959
- First contested: 1959
- Last contested: 2026

Demographics
- Population (2020): 22,181
- Electors (2026): 18,034

N18 Pilah within Negeri Sembilan, as used for the 2023 and 2026 state elections

Pilah is a state constituency in Negeri Sembilan, Malaysia, that has been represented in the Negeri Sembilan State Legislative Assembly.

The state constituency was first contested in 1959 and is mandated to return a single Assemblyman to the Negeri Sembilan State Legislative Assembly under the first-past-the-post voting system.

== Demographics ==
Ethnic breakdown of Pilah's electorate as of 2026
1. Malay (65.6%)
2. Chinese (24.7%)
3. Indian (8.70%)
4. Other ethnicities (0.90%)

== History ==
=== Polling districts ===
According to the federal gazette issued on 23 July 2026, the Pilah constituency is divided into 12 polling districts.

State constituency	Polling district	Code	Location
Pilah（N18）	Ampang Tinggi	129/18/01	SK Ampang Tinggi
Pilah（N18）	Kampong Parit	129/18/02	SK Kampong Parit
Pilah（N18）	Pekan Lama	129/18/03	SK Kuala Pilah
Pilah（N18）	Taman Bunga	129/18/04	SM Sains Tuanku Jaafar
Pilah（N18）	Kampong Gemuroh	129/18/05	Balai Raya Kampung Melang
Pilah（N18）	Kampong Jawa	129/18/06	Instutut Latihan Kementerian Kesihatan Malaysia (Kejururawatan) Kuala Pilah
Pilah（N18）	Jalam Yam Tuan	129/18/07	SMJK Chung Hua
Pilah（N18）	Tengku Besar	129/18/08	SJK (C) Chung Hua Kuala Pilah
Pilah（N18）	Bukit Temensu	129/18/09	SMK Tuanku Muhamamad
Pilah（N18）	Batang Pilah	129/18/10	SJK (C) Chung Hua Senaling
Pilah（N18）	Kampong Gachong	129/18/11	SK Tanah Melintang
Pilah（N18）	Seri Pilah	129/18/12	SK Seri Pilah

=== Representation history ===
Members of Assembly for Pilah
Assembly	No	Years	Name	Party
Constituency created
1st	N04	1959-1964	Mohd Idris Matsil	Alliance (UMNO)
2nd	N04	1964-1969	Ariffin Ali	Alliance (UMNO)
		1969-1971	Assembly dissolved	
3rd	N04	1971-1973	Mohd Idris Matsil	Alliance (UMNO)
3rd	N04	1973-1974	Mohd Idris Matsil	BN (UMNO)
4th	N15	1974-1978	Tengku Kalsom Tengku Muda Chik	BN (UMNO)
5th	N15	1978-1982	Tengku Kalsom Tengku Muda Chik	BN (UMNO)
6th	N15	1982-1986	Ramli Ujang	BN (UMNO)
7th	N15	1986-1990	Abu Zahar Ujang	BN (UMNO)
8th	N15	1990-1995	Abu Zahar Ujang	BN (UMNO)
9th	N16	1995-1999	Napsiah Omar	BN (UMNO)
10th	N16	1999-2004	Norhayati Omar	BN (UMNO)
11th	N18	2004-2008	Norhayati Omar	BN (UMNO)
12th	N18	2008-2013	Adnan Abu Hassan	BN (UMNO)
13th	N18	2013-2018	Norhayati Omar	BN (UMNO)
14th	N18	2018-2023	Mohamad Nazaruddin Sabtu	PH (PKR)
15th	N18	2023–2026	Noorzunita Begum Mohd Ibrahim	PH (PKR)
16th	N18	2026-present	S Leza Md Yasin	BN (UMNO)

== Election results ==
Negeri Sembilan state election, 2026: Pilah
Party	Candidate	Votes	%	∆%
BN	S Leza Md Yasin	6,830	52.82	▲52.82
PH	Noorzunita Begum Mohd Ibrahim	6,100	47.18	▼7.57
Total valid votes		12,930	100.00	
Total rejected ballots		113		
Unreturned ballots		14		
Turnout		13,057	72.40	▲7.44
Registered electors		18,034		
Majority		730	5.65	▼3.85
BN gain from PH		Swing		?

Negeri Sembilan state election, 2023: Pilah
Party	Candidate	Votes	%	∆%
PH	Noorzunita Begum Mohd Ibrahim	6,222	54.75	▲54.75
PN	Rafie Mustafa	5,143	45.25	▲45.25
Total valid votes		11,365	100.00	
Total rejected ballots		103		
Unreturned ballots		25		
Turnout		11,493	64.96	▼17.03
Registered electors		17,692		
Majority		1,079	9.50	▼7.08
PH hold		Swing		

Negeri Sembilan state election, 2018: Pilah
Party	Candidate	Votes	%	∆%
PKR	Mohamad Nazaruddin Sabtu	5,643	51.80	▲2.37
BN	Norhayati Omar	3,837	35.22	▼15.35
PAS	Ahmad Fadzil Othman	1,413	12.97	▲12.97
Total valid votes		10,893	100.00	
Total rejected ballots		194		
Unreturned ballots		54		
Turnout		11,141	81.99	▼1.50
Registered electors		13,589		
Majority		1,806	16.58	▲15.44
PKR gain from BN		Swing		?

Negeri Sembilan state election, 2013: Pilah
Party	Candidate	Votes	%	∆%
BN	Norhayati Omar	5,039	50.57	▼7.86
PKR	Mohamad Nazaruddin Sabtu	4,926	49.43	▲7.86
Total valid votes		9,965	100.00	
Total rejected ballots		169		
Unreturned ballots		38		
Turnout		10,172	83.49	▲10.44
Registered electors		12,184		
Majority		113	1.14	▼15.72
BN hold		Swing		

Negeri Sembilan state election, 2008: Pilah
Party	Candidate	Votes	%	∆%
BN	Adnan Abu Hassan	4,359	58.43	▼6.65
PKR	Asmaon Basir	3,101	41.57	▲6.65
Total valid votes		7,460	100.00	
Total rejected ballots		182		
Unreturned ballots		38		
Turnout		7,680	73.05	▲2.26
Registered electors		10,513		
Majority		1,258	16.86	▼13.30
BN hold		Swing		

Negeri Sembilan state election, 2004: Pilah
Party	Candidate	Votes	%	∆%
BN	Norhayati binti Omar	4,714	65.08	▲12.92
PKR	Asmaon Basir	2,529	34.92	▲34.92
Total valid votes		7,243	100.00	
Total rejected ballots		172		
Unreturned ballots		40		
Turnout		7,455	70.79	▲1.25
Registered electors		10,531		
Majority		2,185	30.17	▲25.84
BN hold		Swing		

Negeri Sembilan state election, 1999: Pilah
Party	Candidate	Votes	%	∆%
BN	Norhayati binti Omar	3,758	52.17	▼30.77
PKR	Nordin Ismail	3,446	47.83	▲47.83
Total valid votes		7,204	100.00	
Total rejected ballots		171		
Unreturned ballots		44		
Turnout		7,419	69.54	▲1.66
Registered electors		10,668		
Majority		312	4.33	▼61.55
BN hold		Swing		

Negeri Sembilan state election, 1995: Pilah
Party	Candidate	Votes	%	∆%
BN	Napsiah binti Omar	5,727	82.94	▲15.45
S46	Azizuddin Ishak	1,178	17.06	▼15.45
Total valid votes		6,905	100.00	
Total rejected ballots		191		
Unreturned ballots		33		
Turnout		7,129	67.88	▼5.67
Registered electors		10,502		
Majority		4,549	65.88	▲30.90
BN hold		Swing		

Negeri Sembilan state election, 1990: Pilah
Party	Candidate	Votes	%	∆%
BN	Abu Zahar Dato' Nika Ujang	6,135	67.49	▲3.88
PAS	Abu Samah Katas	2,955	32.51	▲32.51
Total valid votes		9,090	100.00	
Total rejected ballots		281		
Unreturned ballots		27		
Turnout		9,398	73.55	▲2.97
Registered electors		12,778		
Majority		3,180	34.98	▲1.91
BN hold		Swing		

Negeri Sembilan state election, 1986: Pilah
Party	Candidate	Votes	%	∆%
BN	Abu Zahar Dato' Nika Ujang	4,824	63.61	▼5.63
DAP	Tong Jin Chong	2,316	30.54	▲6.74
PAS	Khairudin Daud	444	5.85	▼1.12
Total valid votes		7,584	100.00	
Total rejected ballots		235		
Unreturned ballots		0		
Turnout		7,819	70.58	▼4.04
Registered electors		11,078		
Majority		2,508	33.07	▼12.37
BN hold		Swing		

Negeri Sembilan state election, 1982: Pilah
Party	Candidate	Votes	%	∆%
BN	Ramli Ujang	5,860	69.23	▲14.41
DAP	Abdul Razak Ilong	2,014	23.79	▼6.06
PAS	Mohamed Noh Muharam	590	6.97	▼8.35
Total valid votes		8,464	100.00	
Total rejected ballots		264		
Unreturned ballots		0		
Turnout		8,728	74.62	▼3.47
Registered electors		11,696		
Majority		3,846	45.44	▲20.48
BN hold		Swing		

Negeri Sembilan state election, 1978: Pilah
Party	Candidate	Votes	%	∆%
BN	Tengku Kelsom binti Tuanku Muda Chik	4,287	54.82	▲2.77
DAP	Yusof Bador	2,335	29.86	▲29.86
PAS	Noordin Abdul Samad	1,198	15.32	▲15.32
Total valid votes		7,820	100.00	
Total rejected ballots		343		
Unreturned ballots		0		
Turnout		8,163	78.09	▼0.01
Registered electors		10,453		
Majority		1,952	24.96	▲20.87
BN hold		Swing		

Negeri Sembilan state election, 1974: Pilah
Party	Candidate	Votes	%	∆%
BN	Tengku Kelsom binti Tuanku Muda Chik	3,444	52.05	▲14.53
Independent	Suhaime Shamsudin	3,173	47.95	▲31.90
Total valid votes		6,617	100.00	
Total rejected ballots		160		
Unreturned ballots		0		
Turnout		6,777	78.10	▲0.37
Registered electors		8,677		
Majority		271	4.10	▲3.98
BN gain from Alliance		Swing		-

Negeri Sembilan state election, 1969: Pilah
Party	Candidate	Votes	%	∆%
Alliance	Mohd Idris Mat Sil	1,912	37.52	▼24.29
DAP	Chai Tak Han	1,906	37.40	▲37.40
Independent	Md. Zainol Yatim	818	16.05	▲16.05
PMIP	Mustapha Mohamad	460	9.03	▲2.07
Total valid votes		5,096	100.00	
Total rejected ballots		358		
Unreturned ballots		0		
Turnout		5,454	77.74	▼3.60
Registered electors		7,016		
Majority		6	0.12	▼30.46
Alliance hold		Swing		

Negeri Sembilan state election, 1964: Pilah
Party	Candidate	Votes	%	∆%
Alliance	Ariffin Ali	3,206	61.81	▲7.50
UDP	Chai Tak Han	1,620	31.23	▲31.23
PMIP	Noordin Abdul Samad	361	6.96	▼9.35
Total valid votes		5,187	100.00	
Total rejected ballots		201		
Unreturned ballots		0		
Turnout		5,388	81.34	▲0.74
Registered electors		6,624		
Majority		1,586	30.58	▲5.66
Alliance hold		Swing		

Negeri Sembilan state election, 1959: Pilah
Party	Candidate	Votes	%
Alliance	Mohd Idris Mat Sil	2,328	54.30
Independent	Kok Leong Yin	1,260	29.39
PMIP	Abd. Majid Abd. Wahab	699	16.31
Total valid votes		4,287	100.00
Total rejected ballots		59	
Unreturned ballots		0	
Turnout		4,346	80.60
Registered electors		5,392	
Majority		1,068	24.91
This was a new constituency created.

== Sources ==
- "14th General Election Malaysia (GE14 / PRU14) - Melaka". election.thestar.com.my.
