= Norhayati Omar =

Malaysian politician

Yang Berbahagia Dato' Norhayati Omar DSNS PMC PJK
- نور حياتي عمر

Member of the Negeri Sembilan State Executive Council
- In office 22 May 2013 – 12 May 2018 (Women and Family Development Welfare)
- Monarch: Muhriz
- Menteri Besar: Mohamad Hasan
- Preceded by: Zainab Nasir
- Succeeded by: Nicole Tan Lee Koon
- Constituency: Pilah
- In office 29 March 2004 – 13 March 2008 (Social, Community Development and Women’s Affairs)
- Monarch: Ja'afar
- Menteri Besar: Mohamad Hasan
- Preceded by: Herself
- Succeeded by: Zainab Nasir
- Constituency: Pilah
- In office 1999 – 2004 (Family and Women Development)
- Monarch: Ja'afar
- Menteri Besar: Mohd Isa Abdul Samad
- Preceded by: Napsiah Omar
- Succeeded by: Herself
- Constituency: Pilah

Member of the Negeri Sembilan State Legislative Assembly for Pilah
- In office 5 May 2013 – 9 May 2018
- Preceded by: Adnan Abu Hasan (UMNO–BN)
- Succeeded by: Mohamad Nazaruddin Sabtu (PKR–PH)
- In office 29 November 1999 – 8 March 2008
- Preceded by: Napsiah Omar (UMNO–BN)
- Succeeded by: Adnan Abu Hasan (UMNO–BN)

Personal details
- Born: Negeri Sembilan, Malaysia
- Citizenship: Malaysian
- Party: United Malays National Organisation (UMNO)
- Other political affiliations: Barisan Nasional (BN); Muafakat Nasional (MN)
- Education: Maktab Perguruan Raja Melewar
- Occupation: Politician
- Norhayati Omar on Facebook

Norhayati binti Omar is a Malaysian politician and served as Negeri Sembilan State Executive Councillor.

== Election results ==
Negeri Sembilan State Legislative Assembly
Year	Constituency	Candidate	Votes	Pct	Opponent(s)	Votes	Pct	Ballots cast	Majority	Turnout%
1999	N16 Pilah	Norhayati Omar (UMNO)	3,758	52.17%	Nordin Ismail (KeADILan)	3,446	47.83%	7,375	312	69.13%
2004	N18 Pilah	Norhayati Omar (UMNO)	4,174	62.27%	Asmaon Basir (PKR)	2,529	37.73%	6,875	1,645	63.65%
2013	N18 Pilah	Norhayati Omar (UMNO)	5,039	50.57%	Mohamad Nazaruddin Sabtu (PKR)	4,926	49.43%	10,134	113	83.50%
2018	N18 Pilah	Norhayati Omar (UMNO)	3,837	35.22%	Mohamad Nazaruddin Sabtu (PKR)	5,643	51.81%	11,141	1,806	82.00%
2018	N18 Pilah	Norhayati Omar (UMNO)	3,837	35.22%	Ahmad Fadzil Othman (PAS)	1,413	12.97%	11,141	1,806	82.00%

== Honours ==
- Negeri Sembilan
  - Knight Companion of the Order of Loyalty to Negeri Sembilan (DSNS) – Dato' (2003)
  - Recipient of the Medal for Outstanding Public Service (PMC) (1998)
  - Recipient of the Meritorious Service Medal (PJK) (1997)
