= Bakri Sawir =

Malaysian politician

Yang Berbahagia Dato' Haji Bakri Sawir DPNS
- بکري صوير

Member of the Negeri Sembilan State Executive Council
- In office 23 May 2018 – 14 August 2023 (Agriculture and Agro-based Industry)
- Monarch: Muhriz
- Menteri Besar: Aminuddin Harun
- Preceded by: Hasim Rusdi (Agriculture and Agro-based Industry)
- Succeeded by: Jalaluddin Alias (Senior Member, Agriculture); Portfolio abolished (Agro-based Industry)
- Constituency: Klawang

Member of the Negeri Sembilan State Legislative Assembly for Klawang
- In office 9 May 2018 – 1 August 2026
- Preceded by: Yunus Rahmat (BN–UMNO)
- Succeeded by: Danni Rais (PN–WAWASAN)
- Majority: 976 (2018); 577 (2023)

Personal details
- Born: Bakri bin Sawir; 9 July 1959 (age 67) Negeri Sembilan, Malaysia
- Party: National Trust Party (AMANAH)
- Other political affiliations: Pakatan Harapan (PH)
- Occupation: Politician

Haji Bakri bin Sawir (born 9 July 1959) is a Malaysian politician who has served as Member of the Negeri Sembilan State Legislative Assembly (MLA) for Klawang since May 2018. He served as Member of the Negeri Sembilan State Executive Council (EXCO) in the Pakatan Harapan (PH) state administration under Menteri Besar Aminuddin Harun from May 2018 to August 2023. He is a member of the National Trust Party (AMANAH), a component party of the PH coalition. He is also presently the sole AMANAH Negeri Sembilan MLA and the sole AMANAH candidate elected in the 2023 Negeri Sembilan state election.

== Election results ==
Negeri Sembilan State Legislative Assembly
Year	Constituency	Candidate	Votes	Pct	Opponent(s)	Votes	Pct	Ballots cast	Majority	Turnout
2018	N04 Klawang	Bakri Sawir (AMANAH)	4,296	51.39%	Baharudin Jali (UMNO)	3,320	39.71%	8,531	976	83.10%
2018	N04 Klawang	Bakri Sawir (AMANAH)	4,296	51.39%	Mazly Yasin (PAS)	744	8.90%	8,531	976	83.10%
2023	N04 Klawang	Bakri Sawir (AMANAH)	4,598	51.19%	Danni Rais (BERSATU)	4,021	44.76%	9,063	577	68.85%
2023	N04 Klawang	Bakri Sawir (AMANAH)	4,598	51.19%	Saiful Bahri Jaaman (IND)	364	4.05%	9,063	577	68.85%
2026	N04 Klawang	Bakri Sawir (AMANAH)	3,993	40.53%	Danni Rais (WAWASAN)	5,310	53.90%	9,979	1,317	74.72%
2026	N04 Klawang	Bakri Sawir (AMANAH)	3,993	40.53%	Muhammad Adib Musa (BERSATU)	549	5.57%	9,979	1,317	74.72%

== Honours ==
- Negeri Sembilan
  - Knight Commander of the Order of Loyalty to Negeri Sembilan (DPNS) – Dato' (2021)
