= Teo Kok Seong =

Malaysian politician

Yang Berhormat Tuan Teo Kok Seong MLA
- 张聒翔

Member of the Negeri Sembilan State Executive Council
- In office 24 August 2023 – 2 August 2026
- Monarch: Muhriz
- Menteri Besar: Aminuddin Harun
- Portfolio: Industry and Non-Islamic Affairs
- Preceded by: Mohamad Rafie Abdul Malek (Industry); Chew Seh Yong (Non-Islamic Affairs)
- Constituency: Bahau
- In office 23 May 2018 – 14 August 2023
- Monarch: Muhriz
- Menteri Besar: Aminuddin Harun
- Portfolio: Urban Wellbeing, Local Government, Housing and New Villages
- Preceded by: Jalaluddin Alias (Urban Wellbeing, Housing and Local Government); Manickam Letchuman (New Villages)
- Succeeded by: Arul Kumar Jambunathan (Local Government Development & Housing); Portfolios abolished (Urban Wellbeing & New Villages)
- Constituency: Bahau

Member of the Central Executive Committee of the Democratic Action Party
- Incumbent
- Assumed office 20 March 2022 Serving with: Ronnie Liu Tian Khiew (2022–2023) &; Lim Lip Eng (2022–2025) &; Lim Hui Ying (since 2022) &; Syahredzan Johan (2022–2025) &; Young Syefura Othman (2022–2025) &; Howard Lee Chuan How (2022–2025) &; Tan Hong Pin (2022–2025) &; Alice Lau Kiong Yieng (2022–2025) &; Thomas Su Keong Siong (2022–2025) &; Vincent Wu Him Ven (since 2022) &; Chan Foong Hin (2022–2025) &; Lee Chin Chen (2022–2025) &; Chow Kon Yeow (since 2025) &; Liow Cai Tung (since 2025) &; Yeoh Soon Hin (since 2025) &; Thulsi Thivani Manogaran (since 2025) &; Sivakumar Varatharaju Naidu (since 2025) &; Papparaidu Veraman (since 2025) &; Yap Yee Vonne (since 2025) &; Andrew Chen Kah Eng (since 2025) &; Kelvin Yii Lee Wuen (since 2025) &; Sheikh Umar Bagharib Ali (since 2025)
- Secretary-General: Anthony Loke Siew Fook

Youth Chief of the Democratic Action Party
- In office 9 December 2012 – 22 November 2015
- Secretary-General: Lim Guan Eng
- Deputy: Loh Chee Heng
- Preceded by: Anthony Loke Siew Fook
- Succeeded by: Wong Kah Woh

Member of the Negeri Sembilan State Legislative Assembly for Bahau
- Incumbent
- Assumed office 9 May 2018
- Preceded by: Chew Seh Yong (PR–DAP)
- Majority: 6,109 (2018); 8,408 (2023); 3,307 (2026)
- In office 8 March 2008 – 5 May 2013
- Preceded by: Lim Fui Ming (DAP)
- Succeeded by: Chew Seh Yong (PR–DAP)
- Majority: 837 (2008)

Member of the Malaysian Parliament for Rasah
- In office 5 May 2013 – 9 May 2018
- Preceded by: Anthony Loke Siew Fook (PR–DAP)
- Succeeded by: Cha Kee Chin (PH–DAP)
- Majority: 24,101 (2013)

Personal details
- Born: Teo Kok Seong; 18 October 1979 (age 47) Negeri Sembilan, Malaysia
- Party: Democratic Action Party (DAP) (since 2002)
- Other political affiliations: Barisan Alternatif (BA) (2002–2004); Pakatan Rakyat (PR) (2008–2015); Pakatan Harapan (PH) (since 2015)
- Education: Tunku Abdul Rahman University College
- Occupation: Politician

Chinese name
- Traditional Chinese: 張聒翔
- Simplified Chinese: 张聒翔
- Hanyu Pinyin: Zháng Guōxiáng
- Hokkien POJ: Tioⁿ Koat-siông

Teo Kok Seong (simplified Chinese: 张聒翔; traditional Chinese: 張聒翔; pinyin: Zháng Guōxiáng; Pe̍h-ōe-jī: Tioⁿ Koat-siông; born 18 October 1979) is a Malaysian politician who has served as Member of the Negeri Sembilan State Executive Council (EXCO) in the Pakatan Harapan (PH) state administration under Menteri Besar Aminuddin Harun and Member of the Negeri Sembilan State Legislative Assembly (MLA) for Bahau since May 2018 and from March 2008 to May 2013. He is a member of the Democratic Action Party (DAP), a component party of the PH and formerly Pakatan Rakyat (PR) and Barisan Alternatif (BA) coalitions. He has served as Member of the Central Executive Committee (CEC) of DAP since March 2022. He also served as the Youth Chief of DAP or known as the Chief of the youth wing of DAP namely the DAP Socialist Youth (DAPSY) from December 2012 to November 2015.

== Political career ==
He joined DAP in 2002. In March 2015, he was arrested for his involvement in the "Kita Lawan" rally. In 2008 he was elected to the Negeri Sembilan State Legislative Assembly for the seat of the Bahau and he won election to the federal parliament for the constituency of Rasah in 2013. In 2018 election he switched seat to Bahau and he defeated BN's candidate and PAS's candidate with a majority of 6109 votes. During the 2026 elections, due to the loss of PH constituencies in Chennah, Klawang, Pilah and Repah, he is the sole non BN-PN representative east of Seremban.

== Election results ==
Negeri Sembilan State Legislative Assembly
Year	Constituency	Candidate	Votes	Pct	Opponent(s)	Votes	Pct	Ballots cast	Majority	Turnout
2008	N08 Bahau	Teo Kok Seong (DAP)	6,188	52.24%	Lim Fui Ming (MCA)	5,351	45.17%	11,846	837	72.84%
2018	N08 Bahau	Teo Kok Seong (DAP)	10,094	64.74%	Chong Wan Yu (MCA)	3,985	25.56%	15,591	6,109	81.11%
2018	N08 Bahau	Teo Kok Seong (DAP)	10,094	64.74%	Mustafar Bakri Abdul Aziz (PAS)	1,512	9.70%	15,591	6,109	81.11%
2023	N08 Bahau	Teo Kok Seong (DAP)	11,939	77.18%	Kumar S Paramasivam (PAS)	3,531	22.82%	15,602	8,408	60.55%
2026	N08 Bahau	Teo Kok Seong (DAP)	9,995	59.91%	Chong Fui Ming (MCA)	6,688	40.09%	16,883	3,307	65.00%

Parliament of Malaysia
Year	Constituency	Candidate	Votes	Pct	Opponent(s)	Votes	Pct	Ballots cast	Majority	Turnout
2013	P130 Rasah	Teo Kok Seong (DAP)	48,964	65.77%	Teo Eng Kian (MCA)	25,479	34.23%	75,860	23,485	85.81%
