= Mohamad Nazaruddin Sabtu =

Malaysian politician

Mohamad Nazaruddin Sabtu PPN PJK
- محمد نذارالدين بن سبتو

Member of the Negeri Sembilan State Executive Council
- In office 23 May 2018 – 14 August 2023 (Arts, Culture and Malay Customs)
- Monarch: Muhriz
- Menteri Besar: Aminuddin Harun
- Preceded by: Abdul Razak Said
- Succeeded by: Nicole Tan Lee Koon (Arts and Culture); Portfolio established (Malay Customs)
- Constituency: Pilah

Member of the Negeri Sembilan State Legislative Assembly for Pilah
- In office 9 May 2018 – 12 August 2023
- Preceded by: Norhayati Omar (BN–UMNO)
- Succeeded by: Noorzunita Begum Mohd Ibrahim (PH–PKR)
- Majority: 1,806 (2018)

Personal details
- Born: Mohd Nazaruddin bin Sabtu Negeri Sembilan, Malaysia
- Party: People's Justice Party (PKR)
- Other political affiliations: Pakatan Harapan (PH)
- Occupation: Politician

Mohamad Nazaruddin bin Sabtu is a Malaysian politician who served as Member of the Negeri Sembilan State Executive Council (EXCO) in the Pakatan Harapan (PH) state administration under Menteri Besar Aminuddin Harun and Member of the Negeri Sembilan State Legislative Assembly (MLA) for Pilah from May 2018 to August 2023. He is a member of the People's Justice Party (PKR), a component party of the PH coalition.

== Election results ==
Negeri Sembilan State Legislative Assembly
Year	Constituency	Candidate	Votes	Pct	Opponent(s)	Votes	Pct	Ballots cast	Majority	Turnout%
2013	N18 Pilah	Mohamad Nazaruddin Sabtu (PKR)	4,926	49.43%	Norhayati Omar (UMNO)	5,039	50.57%	10,134	113	83.50%
2018	N18 Pilah	Mohamad Nazaruddin Sabtu (PKR)	5,643	51.81%	Norhayati Omar (UMNO)	3,837	35.22%	11,141	1,806	82.00%
2018	N18 Pilah	Mohamad Nazaruddin Sabtu (PKR)	5,643	51.81%	Ahmad Fadzil Othman (PAS)	1,413	12.97%	11,141	1,806	82.00%

== Honours ==
- Malaysia
  - Medal of the Order of the Defender of the Realm (PPN) (1996)
- Negeri Sembilan
  - Recipient of the Meritorious Service Medal (PJK) (1996)
