= Cha Kee Chin =

Malaysian politician

Yang Berhormat Tuan Cha Kee Chin MP
- 谢琪清; Chiā Kî-chhiⁿ

Member of the Malaysian Parliament for Rasah
- Incumbent
- Assumed office 9 May 2018
- Preceded by: Teo Kok Seong (PR–DAP)
- Majority: 46,867 (2018); 61,987 (2022)

Member of the Negeri Sembilan State Legislative Assembly for Bukit Kepayang
- In office 8 March 2008 – 9 May 2018
- Preceded by: Chan Khee Voon (BN–GERAKAN)
- Succeeded by: Nicole Tan Lee Koon (PH–DAP)
- Majority: 5,700 (2008); 9,457 (2013)

Personal details
- Born: Cha Kee Chin; 20 November 1974 (age 51) Bukit Kepayang, Seremban, Negeri Sembilan, Malaysia
- Citizenship: Malaysian
- Party: Democratic Action Party (DAP)
- Other political affiliations: Pakatan Rakyat (PR) (2008–2015); Pakatan Harapan (PH) (since 2015)
- Occupation: Politician
- Cha Kee Chin on Parliament of Malaysia

Cha Kee Chin (simplified Chinese: 谢琪清; traditional Chinese: 謝琪清; pinyin: Xiè Qíqīng; Pe̍h-ōe-jī: Chiā Kî-chhiⁿ; born 20 November 1974) is a Malaysian politician who has served as the Member of Parliament (MP) for Rasah since May 2018. He served as Member of the Negeri Sembilan State Legislative Assembly (MLA) for Bukit Kepayang from March 2008 to May 2018. He is a member and State Secretary of Negeri Sembilan of the Democratic Action Party (DAP), a component party of the Pakatan Harapan (PH) and formerly Pakatan Rakyat (PR) coalitions.

== Request for probe into distribution of food baskets ==
On 25 April 2020, Cha wrote a letter to then Prime Minister Muhyiddin Yassin to request him to order a probe into the distribution of food baskets to lower-income (B40, meaning Bawah 40%, the 40% bottom, describing the 40% people with lowest income) group affected by the COVID-19 pandemic to ensure transparency and prevent abuse. Cha questioned the costs of food baskets, which he claimed they only costed RM 35, in strong contradiction with the guidelines of the Ministry of Finance which outlined that they cost RM 100 and each MP would receive 1,000 baskets. Cha also shared that prior to writing Muhyiddin the letter, he had checked with the State Welfare Department of Negeri Sembilan on the remaining and unsent 850 food baskets and the department was unable to provide him a satisfactory reply.

== Election results ==
Negeri Sembilan State Legislative Assembly
Year	Constituency	Candidate	Votes	Pct	Opponent(s)	Votes	Pct	Ballots cast	Majority	Turnout
2008	N21 Bukit Kepayang	Cha Kee Chin (DAP)	9,333	70.95%	Chan Kee Voon (Gerakan)	3,633	27.62%	13,154	5,700	79.67%
2013	N21 Bukit Kepayang	Cha Kee Chin (DAP)	13,981	74.22%	Wong Oi Foon (Gerakan)	4,524	24.02%	18,837	9,457	86.40%
2013	N21 Bukit Kepayang	Cha Kee Chin (DAP)	13,981	74.22%	Vijaiyan Sivanathan (IND)	130	0.69%	18,837	9,457	86.40%

Parliament of Malaysia
Year	Constituency	Candidate	Votes	Pct	Opponent(s)	Votes	Pct	Ballots cast	Majority	Turnout
2018	P130 Rasah	Cha Kee Chin (DAP)	61,806	72.45%	Ng Kian Nam (MCA)	14,939	17.51%	86,655	46,867	84.26%
2018	P130 Rasah	Cha Kee Chin (DAP)	61,806	72.45%	Khairil Annuar Wafa (PAS)	8,260	9.68%	86,655	46,867	84.26%
2018	P130 Rasah	Cha Kee Chin (DAP)	61,806	72.45%	A. David Dass (PAP)	302	0.36%	86,655	46,867	84.26%
2022	P130 Rasah	Cha Kee Chin (DAP)	81,434	68.04%	Ng Kian Nam (MCA)	19,447	16.25%	119,691	61,987	76.78%
2022	P130 Rasah	Cha Kee Chin (DAP)	81,434	68.04%	David Choong Vee Hing (Gerakan)	18,810	15.72%	119,691	61,987	76.78%

== Honours ==
=== Honours of Malaysia ===
- Malaysia
  - Recipient of the 17th Yang di-Pertuan Agong Installation Medal (2024)

Parliament of Malaysia
Preceded by Teo Kok Seong	Member of Parliament for Rasah; 10 May 2018–present	Incumbent
