= Jalaluddin Alias =

Malaysian politician (born 1963)

Yang Berhormat Datuk Seri Haji Jalaluddin Alias SMW DPNS PGDK DNS MP MLA
- جلال الدين ألياس
- Jalaluddin in 2026

Deputy Minister of Federal Territories
- In office 30 August 2021 – 24 November 2022
- Monarch: Abdullah
- Prime Minister: Ismail Sabri Yaakob
- Minister: Shahidan Kassim
- Preceded by: Edmund Santhara Kumar Ramanaidu
- Succeeded by: Position abolished
- Constituency: Jelebu

Senior Member of the Negeri Sembilan State Executive Council (Rural Development, Plantation and Commodities, Agriculture and Food Security & Costs of Living)
- In office 24 August 2023 – 27 April 2026
- Monarch: Muhriz
- Menteri Besar: Aminuddin Harun
- Preceded by: Ismail Ahmad (Member, Rural Development); Chew Seh Yong (Member, Plantation); Bakri Sawir (Member, Agriculture); Portfolios established (Commodities, Food Security & Costs of Living)
- Constituency: Pertang

Member of the Negeri Sembilan State Executive Council (Urban Wellbeing, Housing and Local Government)
- In office 22 May 2013 – 12 May 2018
- Monarch: Muhriz
- Menteri Besar: Mohamad Hasan
- Preceded by: Siow Chen Pin
- Succeeded by: Teo Kok Seong
- Constituency: Pertang

Chairman of the UDA Holdings Berhad
- In office 13 May 2020 – 8 November 2021
- Minister: Wan Junaidi Tuanku Jaafar (2020–2021); Noh Omar (2021)
- Chief Executive Officer: Mohd Salem Kailany
- Preceded by: Hisham Hamdan
- Succeeded by: Norliza Abdul Rahim

Member of the Malaysian Parliament for Jelebu
- Incumbent
- Assumed office 9 May 2018
- Preceded by: Zainudin Ismail (BN–UMNO)
- Majority: 2,045 (2018); 8,125 (2022)

Member of the Negeri Sembilan State Legislative Assembly for Pertang
- Incumbent
- Assumed office 12 August 2023
- Preceded by: Noor Azmi Yusof (BN–UMNO)
- Majority: 2,790 (2023)
- In office 5 May 2013 – 9 May 2018
- Preceded by: Razak Mansor (BN–UMNO)
- Succeeded by: Noor Azmi Yusof (BN–UMNO)
- Majority: 2,163 (2013)

Member of the Negeri Sembilan State Legislative Assembly for Klawang
- In office 21 March 2004 – 8 March 2008
- Preceded by: Shamsul Bahari Mat (BN–UMNO)
- Succeeded by: Yunus Rahmat (BN–UMNO)
- Majority: 1,308 (2004)

State Chairman of the United Malays National Organisation of Negeri Sembilan
- Incumbent
- Assumed office 22 March 2023
- President: Ahmad Zahid Hamidi
- Deputy: Hasim Rusdi
- Preceded by: Mohamad Hasan

Faction represented in Dewan Rakyat
- 2018–: Barisan Nasional

Faction represented in the Negeri Sembilan State Legislative Assembly
- 2013–2018: Barisan Nasional
- 2023–: Barisan Nasional

Personal details
- Born: Jalaluddin bin Alias; 5 September 1963 (age 63) Jelebu, Negeri Sembilan, Malaysia
- Party: United Malay National Organisation (UMNO)
- Other political affiliations: Barisan Nasional (BN)
- Spouse: Maziah Mohd Nor
- Education: Universiti Putra Malaysia (BEd, MPA)
- Occupation: Politician
- Profession: Teacher

Jalaluddin bin Alias (Jawi: جلال الدين بن ألياس; born 5 September 1963) is a Malaysian politician who has served as the Member of Parliament (MP) for Jelebu since May 2018 and the Member of the Negeri Sembilan State Legislative Assembly (MLA) for Pertang since August 2023, a seat he previously held from 2013 to 2018. He served as Senior Member of the Negeri Sembilan State Executive Council (EXCO) under Menteri Besar Aminuddin Harun from August 2023 to April 2026, Deputy Minister of Federal Territories under former Prime Minister Ismail Sabri Yaakob from August 2021 to November 2022, and Member of the Negeri Sembilan State EXCO under Menteri Besar Mohamad Hasan from 2013 to 2018, Chairman of UDA Holdings Berhad from 2020 to 2021 and the MLA for Klawang from March 2004 to March 2008. He is a member of the United Malays National Organisation (UMNO), a component party of the Barisan Nasional (BN) coalition. He also serves as the State Chairman of BN and UMNO of Negeri Sembilan and the Division Chief of UMNO of Jelebu.

== Early life and education ==
Jalaluddin bin Alias was born at Jelebu, Negeri Sembilan, Malaysia on 5 September 1963. He attended Maktab Perguruan Kinta in Ipoh, Perak. He graduated with a Bachelor's degree in Education (BEd) and subsequently earned a Master's degree in Public Administration (MPA) from Universiti Putra Malaysia (UPM).

== Early career ==
Before entering politics full-time, Jalaluddin worked as a teacher. Between 1990 and 1991, he served in the civil service as a special officer attached to the Kuala Pilah/Jempol and Jelebu District Education Offices. He later transitioned into state-level politics, winning the Klawang state seat in the 2004 Malaysian general election to begin his legislative career.

== Political career ==
Jalaluddin contested and won the Pertang state assembly state in the 2013 general election. Following the election, he was appointed as state executive councillor for Urban Wellbeing, Housing and Local Government under the leadership of Menteri Besar, Mohamad Hasan.

He contested and won the Jelebu parliamentary seat in 2018. He succeeded Zainudin Ismail, who died due to complications from a brain tumour he suffered in the previous year.

Jalaluddin is a supporter for co-operation between Barisan Nasional, which UMNO leads, and Perikatan Nasional.

== Controversies and issues ==
=== 2026 Negeri Sembilan constitutional crisis ===
In April 2026, Jalaluddin attracted national attention after leading 14 members of the Negeri Sembilan State Legislative Assembly from the United Malays National Organisation within Barisan Nasional in withdrawing their support for Menteri Besar Aminuddin Harun. The move significantly altered the state's political landscape and contributed to the early dissolution of the Negeri Sembilan State Legislative Assembly in June 2026, paving the way for the 2026 Negeri Sembilan state election held in August.

The political developments coincided with a constitutional and customary governance dispute involving the Yang di-Pertuan Besar of Negeri Sembilan, Tuanku Muhriz, and the Undang Yang Empat. Jalaluddin stated that his party's actions were intended to prevent the monarchy from becoming the subject of prolonged public controversy. However, critics argued that the withdrawal of support carried political implications for the administration of Aminuddin, which was widely regarded as supportive of Muhriz's position.

=== 2026 state election ===
During the election campaign, Jalaluddin defended the political cooperation between Barisan Nasional and Perikatan Nasional, including the Malaysian Islamic Party (PAS). He stated that the cooperation would not affect the rights of non-Malay communities and rejected claims that PAS's participation in the alliance would alter the position of other ethnic groups. His remarks received mixed reactions from political parties and the public. During the campaign, Jalaluddin also became the subject of controversy after a video of one of his speeches circulated widely on social media. In the speech, he referred to "Chinese religion" and "Tamil religion", remarks that attracted criticism on the grounds that they were factually inaccurate. Around the same period, banners displaying his image alongside the slogan Barisan Nasional Menang, Muhriz Turun ("Barisan Nasional Wins, Muhriz Steps Down") appeared in several locations. Jalaluddin denied any involvement in the production or display of the banners and described them as an attempt by unidentified parties to influence public perception.

Following the election, Jalaluddin's absence from the swearing-in ceremony of the new Menteri Besar, Ismail Lasim, at Seri Menanti Palace on 2 August 2026 sparked public speculation. Some observers claimed that he had deliberately boycotted the ceremony because he was disappointed at not being appointed Menteri Besar, having previously been regarded as Barisan Nasional's leading candidate for the post. Jalaluddin denied the allegation, joking that his "body was not sick" over the outcome. He explained that his absence was solely due to logistical factors, stating that the invitation from the state protocol department had only been received at 4.50 a.m. on the day of the ceremony. The controversy continued few days later when Jalaluddin announced that he would decline any appointment to the Negeri Sembilan State Executive Council. He claimed that the decision was intended to make way for a new generation of capable Barisan Nasional leaders to serve in the state administration.

== Personal life ==
Jalaluddin is married to Maziah Mohd Nor.

== Election results ==
Negeri Sembilan State Legislative Assembly
Year	Constituency	Candidate	Votes	Pct	Opponent(s)	Votes	Pct	Ballots cast	Majority	Turnout
2004	N04 Klawang	Jalaluddin Alias (UMNO)	3,555	61.27%	Sharman Abu (PAS)	2,247	38.73%	5,959	1,308	69.76%
2013	N02 Pertang	Jalaluddin Alias (UMNO)	5,090	63.49%	Muhamad Syamwill Mertadza (PKR)	2,927	36.51%	8,140	2,163	83.60%
2023	N02 Pertang	Jalaluddin Alias (UMNO)	5,634	66.45%	Amiruddin Hassan (PAS)	2,844	33.55%	8,561	2,790	66.38%

Parliament of Malaysia
Year	Constituency	Candidate	Votes	Pct	Opponent(s)	Votes	Pct	Ballots cast	Majority	Turnout
2018	P126 Jelebu	Jalaluddin Alias (UMNO)	19,062	48.93%	Mustafar Ab Kadir (AMANAH)	17,017	43.68%	39,733	2,045	81.89%
2018	P126 Jelebu	Jalaluddin Alias (UMNO)	19,062	48.93%	Norman Ipin (PAS)	2,878	7.39%	39,733	2,045	81.89%
2022	P126 Jelebu	Jalaluddin Alias (UMNO)	21,805	48.10%	Zulkefly Mohamad Omar (AMANAH)	13,680	30.18%	45,334	8,125	76.11%
2022	P126 Jelebu	Jalaluddin Alias (UMNO)	21,805	48.10%	Zaharuddin Baba Samion (BERSATU)	9,596	21.17%	45,334	8,125	76.11%
2022	P126 Jelebu	Jalaluddin Alias (UMNO)	21,805	48.10%	Ahmad Fakri Abu Samah (PUTRA)	253	0.56%	45,334	8,125	76.11%

== Honours ==
=== Honours of Malaysia ===
- Malaysia
  - Recipient of the 17th Yang di-Pertuan Agong Installation Medal (2026)
- Federal Territory (Malaysia)
  - Grand Commander of the Order of the Territorial Crown (SMW) – Datuk Seri (2021)
- Negeri Sembilan
  - Knight Commander of the Order of Loyalty to Negeri Sembilan (DPNS) – Dato' (2014)
  - Companion of the Order of Loyalty to Negeri Sembilan (DNS) (2001)
- Sabah
  - Commander of the Order of Kinabalu (PGDK) – Datuk (2008)
