= Mak Kah Keong =

Malaysian politician

- 麦嘉强

Supreme Council Member of Perikatan Nasional
- Incumbent
- Assumed office 2020 Serving with: Takiyuddin Hassan; Ronald Kiandee; Guan Dee Koh Hoi

Secretary-General of the Parti Gerakan Rakyat Malaysia
- Incumbent
- Assumed office 17 November 2018
- President: Dominic Lau Hoe Chai

Personal details
- Party: Parti Gerakan Rakyat Malaysia (GERAKAN)
- Other political affiliations: Barisan Nasional (BN) (–2018); Perikatan Nasional (PN) (2021–present)
- Occupation: Politician
- Profession: Lawyer

Mak Kah Keong is the Secretary-General of the Parti Gerakan Rakyat Malaysia (GERAKAN) since November 2018. He won the GERAKAN Secretary-General in the party elections in 2018. He was reelected to the position in 2023. He is a member of GERAKAN, a component party of the Perikatan Nasional (PN) and formerly Barisan Nasional (BN) coalitions.

== Election results ==
Negeri Sembilan State Legislative Assembly
Year	Constituency	Candidate	Votes	Pct	Opponent(s)	Votes	Pct	Ballots cast	Majority	Turnout
2018	N21 Bukit Kepayang	Mak Kah Keong (Gerakan)	3,744	16.71%	Nicole Tan Lee Koon (DAP)	18,668	83.29%	22,685	14,924	85.20%
