= Pertang (state constituency) =

Political subdivision in Malaysia

Pertang (N02)
Negeri Sembilan constituency

State constituency
- Legislature: Negeri Sembilan State Legislative Assembly
MLA
Jalaluddin Alias
BN
- Constituency created: 1959
- First contested: 1959
- Last contested: 2026

Demographics
- Electors (2026): 12,897

N02 Pertang within Negeri Sembilan, as used for the 2023 and 2026 state elections

Pertang is a state constituency in Negeri Sembilan, Malaysia, represented in the Negeri Sembilan State Legislative Assembly. It has been represented by Senior Member of the State Executive Council (EXCO) Jalaluddin Alias since 2023 and previously from 2013 to 2018.

The state constituency was first contested in 1959 and is mandated to return a single Assemblyman to the Negeri Sembilan State Legislative Assembly under the first-past-the-post voting system.

== Demographics ==
Ethnic breakdown of Pertang's electorate as of 2026
1. Malay (66.4%)
2. Chinese (19.3%)
3. Other ethnicities (7.80%)
4. Indian (6.50%)

== History ==
=== Polling districts ===
According to the gazette issued on 23 July 2026, the Pertang constituency has a total of 8 polling districts.

State constituency	Polling districts	Code	Location
Pertang (N02)	Jerang	126/02/01	Balai Raya Kampung Jerang
Pertang (N02)	Kampong Lakai	126/02/02	SK Putra
Pertang (N02)	Pasoh 4	126/02/03	SK (FELDA) Pasoh 4
Pertang (N02)	Pasoh 1	126/02/04	SK Pasoh Satu
Pertang (N02)	Simpang Pertang	126/02/05	SJK (C) Simpang Pertang
Pertang (N02)	Kampong Petaseh	126/02/06	SK Petaseh
Pertang (N02)	Pertang	126/02/07	SJK (C) Kg. Baru Pertang
Pertang (N02)	Kampong Gelang	126/02/08	SK Gelang Terusan

=== Representation history ===
Members of Assembly for Pertang
Assembly	No	Years	Name	Party
Constituency created
1st	N18	1959-1964	Aminuddin Abdul Manap	Independent
2nd	N18	1964-1969	Aminuddin Abdul Manap	Alliance (UMNO)
		1969-1971	Assembly was dissolved	
3rd	N18	1971-1973	Aminuddin Abdul Manap	Alliance (UMNO)
3rd	N18	1973-1974	Aminuddin Abdul Manap	BN (UMNO)|
4th	N02	1974-1978	Aminuddin Abdul Manap	BN (UMNO)|
5th	N02	1978-1982	Rais Yatim	BN (UMNO)|
6th	N02	1982-1986	Abdul Kadir Kassim	BN (UMNO)|
7th	N03	1986-1990	Abdul Kadir Kassim	BN (UMNO)|
8th	N03	1990-1995	Sharif Wahid	BN (UMNO)|
9th	N03	1995-1999	Razak Mansor	BN (UMNO)|
10th	N03	1999-2004	Razak Mansor	BN (UMNO)|
11th	N02	2004-2008	Razak Mansor	BN (UMNO)|
12th	N02	2008-2013	Razak Mansor	BN (UMNO)|
13th	N02	2013-2018	Jalaluddin Alias	BN (UMNO)|
14th	N02	2018-2023	Noor Azmi Yusuf	BN (UMNO)|
15th	N02	2023–2026	Jalaluddin Alias	BN (UMNO)|
16th	N02	2026–present	Jalaluddin Alias	BN (UMNO)|

== Election results ==
Negeri Sembilan state election, 2026
Party	Candidate	Votes	%	∆%
BN	Jalaluddin Alias	6,312	68.08	▲1.63
PH	Mohd Umry Abdul Khois	2,593	27.97	▲27.97
BERSATU	Mohd Faizal Fadli Mohd Idrus	367	3.96	▲3.96
Total valid votes		9,301	100.00	
Total rejected ballots		117		
Unreturned ballots		9		
Turnout		9,398	73.01	▲6.54
Registered electors		12,873		
Majority		3,719	40.11	▲7.21
BN hold		Swing		

Negeri Sembilan state election, 2023
Party	Candidate	Votes	%	∆%
BN	Jalaluddin Alias	5,634	66.45	▲17.45
PN	Amiruddin Hassan	2,844	33.55	▲33.55
Total valid votes		8,478	100.00	
Total rejected ballots		83		
Unreturned ballots		11		
Turnout		8,572	66.47	▼14.22
Registered electors		12,897		
Majority		2,790	32.90	▲27.83
BN hold		Swing		

Negeri Sembilan state election, 2018
Party	Candidate	Votes	%	∆%
BN	Noor Azmi Yusof	4,008	49.00	▼14.49
PKR	Osman Mohd Dusa	3,593	43.93	▲7.42
PAS	Hamran Abu Hassan	578	7.07	▲7.07
Total valid votes		8,179	100.00	
Total rejected ballots		176		
Unreturned ballots		37		
Turnout		8,392	80.69	▼2.71
Registered electors		10,400		
Majority		415	5.07	▼21.91
BN hold		Swing		

Negeri Sembilan state election, 2013
Party	Candidate	Votes	%	∆%
BN	Jalaluddin Alias	5,090	63.49	▼3.77
PKR	Muhamad Syamwill Mertadza	2,927	36.51	▲3.77
Total valid votes		8,017	100.00	
Total rejected ballots		123		
Unreturned ballots		0		
Turnout		8,140	83.40	▲5.62
Registered electors		9,760		
Majority		2,163	26.98	▼7.54
BN hold		Swing		

Negeri Sembilan state election, 2008
Party	Candidate	Votes	%	∆%
BN	Abdul Razak Mansor	3,887	67.26	▼28.71
PKR	Halim A Aziz	1,892	32.74	▲28.71
Total valid votes		5,779	100.00	
Total rejected ballots		198		
Unreturned ballots		53		
Turnout		6,030	77.78	▲5.16
Registered electors		8,173		
Majority		1,995	34.52	▼2.58
BN hold		Swing		

Negeri Sembilan state election, 2004
Party	Candidate	Votes	%	∆%
BN	Abdul Razak Mansor	3,874	68.55	
PKR	Mohd Shahrir Zakaria	1,780	31.45	
Total valid votes		5,654	100.00	
Total rejected ballots		172		
Unreturned ballots		0		
Turnout		5,826	72.62	
Registered electors		8,023		
Majority		2,094	37.10	
BN hold		Swing		

Negeri Sembilan state election, 1999
Party	Candidate	Votes	%	∆%
BN	Razak Mansor	5,230	67.63	▲8.42
PAS	Abu Bakar Muhd. Yusoff	2,503	32.37	▲32.37
Total valid votes		7,733	100.00	
Total rejected ballots		220		
Unreturned ballots		13		
Turnout		7,966	78.01	▼1.85
Registered electors		10,212		
Majority		2,727	35.26	▲16.84
BN hold		Swing		

Negeri Sembilan state election, 1995
Party	Candidate	Votes	%	∆%
BN	Razak Mansor	4,371	59.21	▲8.40
S46	Abdul Kadir Md Kassim	3,011	40.79	▼8.40
Total valid votes		7,382	100.00	
Total rejected ballots		202		
Unreturned ballots		20		
Turnout		7,604	79.86	▲1.86
Registered electors		9,522		
Majority		1,360	18.42	▲16.81
BN hold		Swing		

Negeri Sembilan state election, 1990
Party	Candidate	Votes	%	∆%
BN	Sharif Wahid	3,431	50.81	▼30.98
S46	Abdul Kadir Md Kassim	3,322	49.19	▲49.19
Total valid votes		6,753	100.00	
Total rejected ballots		250		
Unreturned ballots		20		
Turnout		7,023	78.00	▲3.14
Registered electors		9,004		
Majority		109	1.61	▼61.96
BN hold		Swing		

Negeri Sembilan state election, 1986
Party	Candidate	Votes	%	∆%
BN	Abdul Kadir Md Kassim	4,711	81.79	▲7.64
PAS	Ibrahim Bagak	1,049	18.21	▲4.08
Total valid votes		5,760	100.00	
Total rejected ballots		245		
Unreturned ballots		0		
Turnout		6,005	74.86	▼4.71
Registered electors		8,022		
Majority		3,662	63.58	▲3.56
BN hold		Swing		

Negeri Sembilan state election, 1982
Party	Candidate	Votes	%	∆%
BN	Abdul Kadir Md Kassim	4,902	74.15	
PAS	Ibrahim Bagak	934	14.13	
DAP	Yaip Sen Kiong	775	11.72	
Total valid votes		6,611	100.00	
Total rejected ballots		168		
Unreturned ballots		0		
Turnout		6,779	79.57	▲79.57
Registered electors		8,520		
Majority		3,968	60.02	▲60.02
BN hold		Swing		

Negeri Sembilan state election, 1978
Party	Candidate	Votes	%	∆%
On the nomination day, Rais Yatim won uncontested.
BN	Rais Yatim			
Total valid votes				
Total rejected ballots				
Unreturned ballots				
Turnout				
Registered electors		7,080		
Majority				
BN hold		Swing		

Negeri Sembilan state election, 1974
Party	Candidate	Votes	%	∆%
BN	Aminuddin Abdul Manaf	1,902	44.94	▲7.24
Independent	Saat Jidin	1,891	44.68	▲24.62
DAP	Daud Ahmad	439	10.37	▼5.01
Total valid votes		4,232	100.00	
Total rejected ballots		279		
Unreturned ballots		0		
Turnout		4,511	82.39	▼0.26
Registered electors		5,475		
Majority		11	0.26	▼10.58
BN gain from Alliance		Swing		-

Negeri Sembilan state election, 1969
Party	Candidate	Votes	%	∆%
Alliance	Aminuddin Abdul Manaf	1,321	37.70	▼20.41
Independent	Saat Jidin	941	26.86	▲10.58
Independent	Md. Baki Maakin	703	20.06	▲3.79
DAP	Ng Poh Loh	539	15.38	▲15.38
Total valid votes		3,504	100.00	
Total rejected ballots		232		
Unreturned ballots		0		
Turnout		3,736	82.65	▼3.50
Registered electors		4,520		
Majority		380	10.84	▼29.02
Alliance hold		Swing		

Negeri Sembilan state election, 1964
Party	Candidate	Votes	%	∆%
Alliance	Aminuddin Abdul Manaf	2,003	58.11	▲18.15
Socialist Front	Sulaiman Mohd. Amin	629	18.25	▲18.25
Independent	Ng Poh Loh (Wu Pau Lu)	561	16.28	▼32.91
UDP	Abdul Aziz Ruslan	254	7.37	▲7.37
Total valid votes		3,447	100.00	
Total rejected ballots		119		
Unreturned ballots		0		
Turnout		3,566	86.16	▲1.79
Registered electors		4,139		
Majority		1,374	39.86	▲30.63
Alliance gain from Independent		Swing		-

Negeri Sembilan state election, 1959
Party	Candidate	Votes	%
Independent	Aminuddin Abdul Manaf	1,305	49.19
Alliance	Ibrahim Mansor	1,060	39.95
PMIP	Ahmad Yaacob	288	10.86
Total valid votes		2,653	100.00
Total rejected ballots		61	
Unreturned ballots		0	
Turnout		2,714	84.36
Registered electors		3,217	
Majority		245	9.23
This was a new constituency created.
