= Bukit Kepayang (state constituency) =

Bukit Kepayang (N21)
Negeri Sembilan constituency

State constituency
- Legislature: Negeri Sembilan State Legislative Assembly
MLA
Nicole Tan Lee Koon
PH
- Constituency created: 2003
- First contested: 2004
- Last contested: 2026

Demographics
- Electors (2023): 46,229

N21 Bukit Kepayang within Negeri Sembilan, as used for the 2023 and 2026 state elections

Bukit Kepayang is a state constituency in Negeri Sembilan, Malaysia, that has been represented in the Negeri Sembilan State Legislative Assembly.

The state constituency was first contested in 2004 and is mandated to return a single Assemblyman to the Negeri Sembilan State Legislative Assembly under the first-past-the-post voting system.

== Demographics ==
Ethnic breakdown of Bukit Kepayang's electorate as of 2026
1. Chinese (48.3%)
2. Malay (28.2%)
3. Indian (21.7%)
4. Other ethnicities (1.80%)

== History ==
=== Polling districts ===
According to the federal gazette issued on 23 July 2026, the Bukit Kepayang constituency is divided into 10 polling districts.

State constituency	Polling district	Code	Location
Bukit Kepayang (N21)	Bukit Kepayang	130/21/01	SJK (C) Hillside; SMJK Chan Wa II; Dewan Orang Ramai Dato' Shahrdin Batu 8
Bukit Kepayang (N21)	Taman Permai	130/21/02	SMK Puteri Seremban; Kompleks Jabatan Kebudayaan dan Kesenian Negara; SK Puteri
Bukit Kepayang (N21)	Jalan Kong Sang	130/21/03	SJK (C) San Min Jalan Lee Sam Seremban
Bukit Kepayang (N21)	Jalan Dato Bandar Tunggal	130/21/04	SMK Methodist (A.C.S) Seremban
Bukit Kepayang (N21)	Jalan Yam Tuan	130/21/05	SJK (T) Lorong Jawa Seremban
Bukit Kepayang (N21)	Jalan Lee Sam	130/21/06	SK Methodist (ACS) Seremban
Bukit Kepayang (N21)	Jalan Tuanku Munawir	130/21/07	SJK (C) Sino English
Bukit Kepayang (N21)	Bukit Tembok	130/21/08	Sekolah Methodist Wesley Seremban
Bukit Kepayang (N21)	Taman Bukit Kaya	130/21/09	SK St Paul Seremban
Bukit Kepayang (N21)	Seremban 2	130/21/10	SK Seremban 2A; SK Seremban 2B; SJK (C) Tung Hua; SK Wwasan; SMK Bukit Kepayang; Dewan Komuniti Mantau; Dewan Taman Rimbun Harapan

=== Representation history ===
Members of the Legislative Assembly for Bukit Kepayang
Assembly	No	Years	Name	Party
Constituency created from Temiang, Labu, Lobak, Mambau and Rahang
11th	N21	2004-2008	Chan Khee Voon (郑啟文)	BN (GERAKAN)
12th	N21	2008-2013	Cha Kee Chin (谢琪清)	PR (DAP)
13th	N21	2013-2015	Cha Kee Chin (谢琪清)	PR (DAP)
13th	N21	2015-2018	Cha Kee Chin (谢琪清)	PH (DAP)
14th	N21	2018-2023	Nicole Tan Lee Koon (陈丽群)	PH (DAP)
15th	N21	2023–2026	Nicole Tan Lee Koon (陈丽群)	PH (DAP)
16th	N21	2026–present	Nicole Tan Lee Koon (陈丽群)	PH (DAP)

== Election results ==
Negeri Sembilan state election, 2026
Party	Candidate	Votes	%	∆%
PH	Nicole Tan Lee Koon	24,096	73.05	▼7.72
PN	Lee Boon Shian	8,889	26.95	▲10.74
Total valid votes		32,985	100.00	
Total rejected ballots		333		
Unreturned ballots		34		
Turnout		33,352	67.29	▲0.96
Registered electors		49,568		
Majority		15,207	46.10	▼18.46
PH hold		Swing		

Negeri Sembilan state election, 2023
Party	Candidate	Votes	%	∆%
PH	Nicole Tan Lee Koon	24,626	80.77	▲80.77
PN	Subramaniam Purusuthoma	4,942	16.21	▲16.21
Independent	Ahmad Zamali Mohamad	921	3.02	▲3.02
Total valid votes		30,489	100.00	
Total rejected ballots		107		
Unreturned ballots		68		
Turnout		30,664	66.33	▼18.92
Registered electors		46,229		
Majority		19,684	64.56	▼2.02
PH hold		Swing		

Negeri Sembilan state election, 2018
Party	Candidate	Votes	%	∆%
PKR	Nicole Tan Lee Koon	18,668	83.29	▲83.29
BN	Mak Kah Keong	3,744	16.71	▼7.36
Total valid votes		22,412	100.00	
Total rejected ballots		196		
Unreturned ballots		77		
Turnout		22,685	85.25	▼1.16
Registered electors		26,610		
Majority		14,924	66.58	▲16.26
PKR hold		Swing		

Malaysian general election, 2013
Party	Candidate	Votes	%	∆%
DAP	Cha Kee Chin	13,981	74.39	▲2.41
BN	Wong Oi Foon	4,524	24.07	▼3.95
Independent	Vijaiyan Sivanathan	130	0.69	▲0.69
Total valid votes		18,635	100.00	
Total rejected ballots		160		
Unreturned ballots		42		
Turnout		18,837	86.41	▲6.71
Registered electors		21,799		
Majority		9,457	50.32	▲6.36
DAP hold		Swing		

Malaysian general election, 2008
Party	Candidate	Votes	%	∆%
DAP	Cha Kee Chin	9,333	71.98	▲24.61
BN	Chan Khee Voon	3,633	28.02	▼24.61
Total valid votes		12,966	100.00	
Total rejected ballots		187		
Unreturned ballots		1		
Turnout		13,154	79.67	▲7.21
Registered electors		16,510		
Majority		5,700	43.96	▲38.70
DAP gain from BN		Swing		?

Negeri Sembilan state election, 2004
Party	Candidate	Votes	%
BN	Chan Khee Voon	4,299	52.53
DAP	Gunasekaren Palasamy	3,869	47.37
Total valid votes		8,168	100.00
Total rejected ballots		232	
Unreturned ballots		232	
Turnout		8,632	72.46
Registered electors		11,913	
Majority		430	5.26
This was a new constituency created.
