= Nicole Tan Lee Koon =

Malaysian politician & lawyer

Yang Berhormat Puan Nicole Tan Lee Koon ANS MLA
- 陈丽群

Member of the Negeri Sembilan State Executive Council
- In office 24 August 2023 – 2 August 2026
- Monarch: Muhriz
- Menteri Besar: Aminuddin Harun
- Portfolio: Tourism, Arts and Culture
- Preceded by: Aminuddin Harun (Tourism); Mohamad Nazaruddin Sabtu (Arts and Culture)
- Constituency: Bukit Kepayang
- In office 23 May 2018 – 14 August 2023
- Monarch: Muhriz
- Menteri Besar: Aminuddin Harun
- Portfolio: Women & Welfare Affairs
- Preceded by: Norhayati Omar
- Succeeded by: Noorzunita Begum Mohd Ibrahim
- Constituency: Bukit Kepayang

Member of the Negeri Sembilan State Legislative Assembly for Bukit Kepayang
- Incumbent
- Assumed office 9 May 2018
- Preceded by: Cha Kee Chin (PR–DAP)
- Majority: 14,924 (2018); 19,684 (2023)

Personal details
- Born: Nicole Tan Lee Koon; 17 March 1971 (age 55) Negeri Sembilan, Malaysia
- Party: Democratic Action Party (DAP)
- Other political affiliations: Pakatan Harapan (PH)
- Spouse: Aldrin Chan Wei Yin
- Education: King George V School, Seremban
- Alma mater: University of London (LLB); University of Malaya (LLM)
- Occupation: Politician
- Profession: Lawyer

Nicole Tan Lee Koon is a Malaysian politician and lawyer who has served as Member of the Negeri Sembilan State Executive Council (EXCO) in the Pakatan Harapan (PH) state administration under Menteri Besar Aminuddin Harun and Member of the Negeri Sembilan State Legislative Assembly (MLA) for Bukit Kepayang since May 2018. She is a member of the Democratic Action Party (DAP), a component party of the PH coalition. She was elected as the Women Chief of Negeri Sembilan Pakatan Harapan on 10 October 2020.

== Political career ==
Nicole Tan initiated the setting up of a transit home called Rumah Minda Ceria (RMC) for the homeless in NS and the NS Food Bank under her portfolio on 27 June 2018. She also initiated the Power House Wanita Gemilang (PH GEM), an initiative of Negeri Sembilan Pakatan Harapan, has a fund of RM1.6 million to be used for programmes to empower and develop women in the state in the following fields – human rights, education, health, environment and socio-economy. She also opened a free market called the Kedai Muhibah Raya (KMR) which is an initiative giving free clothes to anyone in need. KMR is also a branch of the Pusat Khidmat DUN Bukit Kepayang.

== Election results ==
Negeri Sembilan State Legislative Assembly
Year	Constituency	Candidate	Votes	Pct	Opponent(s)	Votes	Pct	Ballots cast	Majority	Turnout%
2018	N21 Bukit Kepayang	Nicole Tan Lee Koon (DAP)	18,668	83.29%	Mak Kah Keong (Gerakan)	3,744	16.71%	22,685	14,924	85.20%
2023	N21 Bukit Kepayang	Nicole Tan Lee Koon (DAP)	24,626	80.77%	Subramaniam Purusuthoma (BERSATU)	4,942	16.21%	30,596	19,684	66.18%
2023	N21 Bukit Kepayang	Nicole Tan Lee Koon (DAP)	24,626	80.77%	Ahmad Zamali (IND)	921	3.02%	30,596	19,684	66.18%

== Honours ==
- Negeri Sembilan
  - Member of the Order of Loyalty to Negeri Sembilan (ANS) (2016)
