= Rais Yatim =

Malaysian politician

Yang Berbahagia Tan Sri Dr. Rais Yatim PSM SJMK SPDK SPMP SSAP
- رئيس يتيم
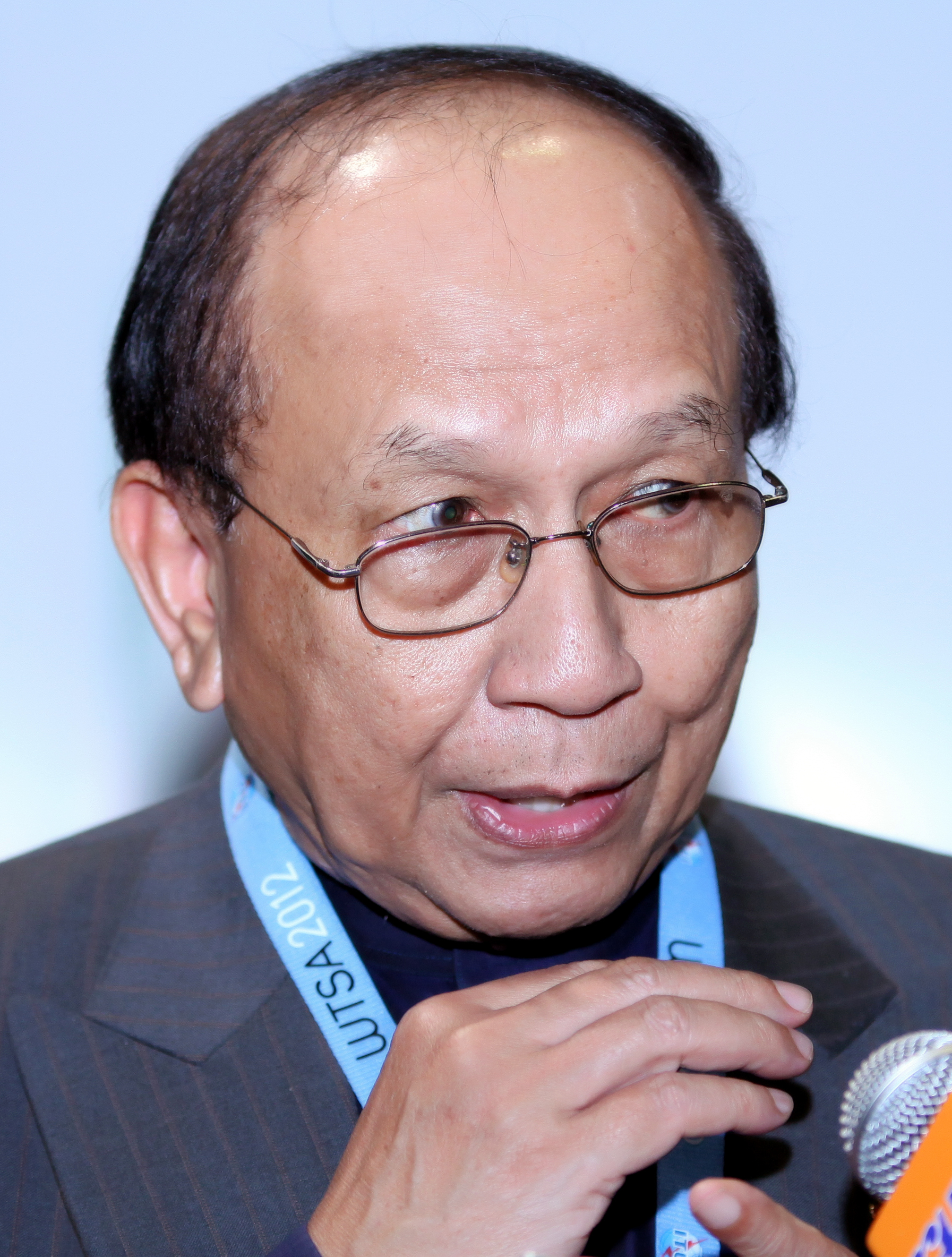
- Rais in 2013

18th President of the Dewan Negara
- In office 2 September 2020 – 15 June 2023
- Monarch: Abdullah
- Prime Minister: Muhyiddin Yassin (2020–2021); Ismail Sabri Yaakob (2021–2022); Anwar Ibrahim (2022–2023)
- Deputy: Abdul Halim Abdul Samad (2020); Mohamad Ali Mohamad (2020–2023)
- Preceded by: Vigneswaran Sanasee
- Succeeded by: Wan Junaidi Tuanku Jaafar

5th Menteri Besar of Negeri Sembilan
- In office 12 July 1978 – 29 April 1982
- Monarch: Ja'afar
- Preceded by: Mansor Othman
- Succeeded by: Mohd Isa Abdul Samad
- Constituency: Pertang

Senator (Appointed by the Yang di-Pertuan Agong)
- In office 16 June 2020 – 15 June 2023
- Monarch: Abdullah
- Prime Minister: Muhyiddin Yassin (2020–2021); Ismail Sabri Yaakob (2021–2022); Anwar Ibrahim (2022–2023)

6th President of the International Islamic University Malaysia
- In office 3 June 2013 – 1 June 2018
- Chancellor: Ahmad Shah
- Preceded by: Mohd Sidek Hassan
- Succeeded by: Maszlee Malik

Ministerial roles
- 1974–1976: Parliamentary Secretary of Culture, Youth and Sports
- 1976–1978: Deputy Minister of Law
- 1978: Deputy Minister of Home Affairs
- 1982–1984: Minister of Lands and Regional Development
- 1984–1986: Minister for Information
- 1986–1987: Minister of Foreign Affairs
- 1999–2004: Minister in the Prime Minister's Department
- 2004–2008: Minister of Culture, Arts and Heritage
- 2008–2009: Minister of Foreign Affairs
- 2009–2013: Minister for Information, Communication and Culture

Personal details
- Born: Rais bin Yatim; 16 April 1942 (age 84) Kampung Gagu, Jelebu, Negeri Sembilan, Japanese-occupied Malaya (now Malaysia)
- Citizenship: Malaysian
- Party: National Vision Party (WAWASAN) (2026–present); Malaysian United Indigenous Party (BERSATU) (2018–2026); United Malays National Organisation (UMNO) (1967–1988; 1996–2018); Parti Melayu Semangat 46 (S46) (1989–1996)
- Other political affiliations: Perikatan Nasional (PN) (2020–present); Pakatan Harapan (PH) (2018–2020); Barisan Nasional (BN) (1967–1988; 1996–2018); Gagasan Rakyat (GR) (1989–1996); Angkatan Perpaduan Ummah (APU) (1990–1996)
- Spouse: Masnah Muhamat
- Children: 4 (including Danni)
- Education: University of Singapore (LLB, LLM); King's College London (PhD)
- Occupation: Politician
- Profession: Lawyer

Rais Yatim

Faction represented in Dewan Rakyat
- 1974–1978: Barisan Nasional
- 1982–1989: Barisan Nasional
- 1989–1990: Parti Melayu Semangat 46
- 1999–2013: Barisan Nasional

Faction represented in Dewan Negara
- 2020: Malaysian United Indigenous Party
- 2020–2023: Perikatan Nasional

Faction represented in Negeri Sembilan State Legislative Assembly
- 1978–1982: Barisan Nasional

Rais Yatim (Jawi: رئيس بن يتيم; born 16 April 1942) is a Malaysian politician and lawyer who served as the 18th President of the Dewan Negara from September 2020 to June 2023, fifth Menteri Besar of Negeri Sembilan from 1978 to 1982, and Member of Parliament (MP) for Jelebu from 1974 to 1990, and again from 1999 to 2013.

He was a member of the United Malays National Organisation (UMNO), the leading party in previous ruling Barisan Nasional (BN) coalition, except for a period in the 1990s when he became a member of the opposition Parti Melayu Semangat 46 (S46). Presently he is a member of Malaysian United Indigenous Party (BERSATU) and its Chairman of the state of Negeri Sembilan, a component party of the ruling Perikatan Nasional (PN) since he left UMNO to join BERSATU on 4 June 2018.

During his short break from active politics before joining BERSATU, he became the President of the International Islamic University Malaysia (IIUM) from 2013 to 2018.

== Early life and education ==
Born to Minangkabau immigrant parents named Muhammad Yatim bin Tahir (1904-1986) and his wife, Siandam (1906-1954) in Kampung Gagu, Jelebu, Negeri Sembilan, who were married in 1926. Rais has three elder siblings for he is the youngest-born child in a family of four children, namely Naam (born 1927), Suri (born 1932) and Atan (born 1934).

He graduated from Language Institute (also known as Language Teaching College), Kuala Lumpur in 1964. Rais through early education Standard I and II at Sekolah Melayu Triang (now Sekolah Kebangsaan Teriang), then move on to the School of Malay Gagu and Government English School, Taipei, Kuala Klawang. While at GES, Rais's writing skills using elements of art and beautiful languages as well as his interest in reading began to take shape, which became the identity to his current writing and speaking style. He was exposed to Shakespeare's dialogues especially King Henry V, Hamlet, Midsummer Night Dream, Romeo and Juliet and others.

After graduating from the Cambridge Senior School Certificate (CSC), Rais worked as a temporary teacher at Sekolah Kebangsaan Astana Raja, in Rembau. In 1963, Rais was accepted into the Language Teaching College (LI) as a trainee teacher for 2 years. While at LI, in addition to his duties as a trainee teacher, Rais produced many articles published by Utusan Zaman, Dewan Masharakat, Mastika and Dewan Bahasa. Rais enrolled at Stamford College and later went on to study Law at the University of Singapore.

At the University of Singapore, among the figures who became his lecturers were Ramachandran Naidu (former court interpreter in Kuala Lumpur), Sulaiman Abdullah (well-known lawyer) and Chandra Muzaffar (former vice president of PKR). Rais was very active in participating in debate and speech competitions at the University of Singapore and often met Chandra in the competition. He won the Beasley Shield Award for the general speech category, while Chandra won the debate competition.

A lawyer by profession later, he received his Bachelor of Laws LL.B (Hons.) In 1973 and obtained an A mark in the paper “Comparative Law” which refined on the comparison of Adat Perpatih with Common Law.

== Early career ==
In 1973 he became a lawyer and solicitor in the Kuala Lumpur High Court and then in 1998 became a lawyer in Singapore. In the same year, Rais set up the law firm of Ram Rais & Yap.

In 1965 to 1968, he taught Bahasa Malaysia to the American Peace Corps in the United States. Upon his return from the US, Rais taught English, History, Science and Drawing at Undang Luak Jelebu Secondary School and then in 1967, he was assigned to Bandar Tinggi Secondary School.

Rais also worked as a translator at Dewan Bahasa dan Pustaka (DBP) in 1971 besides being a part-time lecturer in Commercial Law at Institut Teknologi Mara (now UiTM).

He subsequently obtained a doctorate (Ph.D) in law from King's College University of London in 1994 and his thesis was Rule Of Law and Executive Supremacy in Malaysia. His doctoral dissertation was eventually published in 1995 as Freedom Under Executive Power in Malaysia: A Study of Executive Supremacy.

== Political career ==
Rais has held various positions in the national cabinet and other state government positions. He had been appointed a Minister in the Prime Minister's Department, Menteri Besar of Negeri Sembilan (1978–1982), Minister of Land and Regional Development (1982–1984), Minister of Information (1984–1986) and Foreign Minister (1986–1987).

When he fell out of favour of the UMNO leadership in April 1987, he became the deputy leader of the opposition Parti Melayu Semangat 46 (S46 or Semangat 46), a breakaway party formed by Tengku Razaleigh Hamzah and UMNO members dissatisfied with Mahathir Mohamad's leadership. During that times he also he resumed his law career and worked with a firm, Ram, Rais & Partner, from 1987 to 1999. Like most Semangat 46 leaders, after the party was dissolved in 1996, he rejoined UMNO by the end of the decade. Upon his return to the ministry in 1999, as Minister in the Prime Minister's Department, he was effusive in his praise for Mahathir, who had outlasted the Semangat 46 movement with successive election victories. He held the ministry until the 2004 election, after which Abdullah Badawi, who had replaced Mahathir on his retirement, appointed him as Minister of Culture, Arts and Heritage.

In June 2007, Rais was nominated as a candidate for the post of the next Commonwealth Secretary-General after Don McKinnon's term in office ended in March 2008. However, he pulled out on 26 July, citing the lateness of campaigning, and his duties and commitments as the Main Committee of the upcoming 50th Merdeka celebrations, which limited him from travelling out of the country to lobby for his candidacy.

Rais served another term as Foreign Minister from 18 March 2008 until 9 April 2009, when the incoming Prime Minister Najib Razak appointed him as the Minister for Information, Communications and Culture. He remained in that ministry until the 2013 election, when he was dropped as a parliamentary candidate. Speaking generally about Barisan Nasional's decision to drop a number of senior figures from its parliamentary lineup, Najib stated that it was to "satisfy the demands of voters who want to see Barisan Nasional and UMNO change and reform". Rais accepted the decision and called on fellow UMNO members to remain loyal to the party. Within a few months he was appointed the President of the International Islamic University of Malaysia.

On 16 June 2020, he was appointed a Senator in the Dewan Negara by the Yang di-Pertuan Agong after he joined BERSATU in June 2018 and returned to active politics.

== Personal life ==
He is married to Masnah Muhamat. The couple has four children, namely Malini Rais, Dino Rais, Danni Rais and Ronni Rais. During his childhood and adolescence, Rais interacted a lot with the local Chinese community. This enabled him to speak Cantonese (the main Chinese language spoken throughout Negeri Sembilan) fluently, in addition to his native Negeri Sembilan Minangkabau, Standard Malay and English. His hobbies are photography and travelling and arts-culture. Apart from being highly skilled in photography, Rais is also talented in drawing. He obtained an A mark in the Higher School Certificate (HSC) examination. Rais even produced a large mural for Dunearn Road Hostel at the University of Singapore and the mural is still on display at Shears Hall Great Hall in Kent Ridge.

== Election results ==
Parliament of Malaysia
Year	Constituency	Candidate	Votes	Pct	Opponent(s)	Votes	Pct	Ballots cast	Majority	Turnout
1974	P089 Jelebu	Rais Yatim (UMNO)	N/A	N/A	Abdul Muluk Daud (DAP)	N/A	N/A	N/A	N/A	N/A
1974	P089 Jelebu	Rais Yatim (UMNO)	N/A	N/A	Zainal Abidin Bador (IND)	N/A	N/A	N/A	N/A	N/A
1982	P089 Jelebu	Rais Yatim (UMNO)	22,279	75.70%	Yap Sen Koong (DAP)	5,477	18.61%	30,285	16,802	78.19%
1982	P089 Jelebu	Rais Yatim (UMNO)	22,279	75.70%	Raja Aziz Raja Karim (PAS)	1,675	5.69%	30,285	16,802	78.19%
1986	P103 Jelebu	Rais Yatim (UMNO)	16,137	77.43%	Ishak Md Nazir (PAS)	4,705	22.57%	21,712	11,432	76.02%
1990	P103 Jelebu	Rais Yatim (S46)	12,780	49.24%	Ibrahim Sareh (UMNO)	13,175	50.76%	26,637	395	80.03%
1995	P113 Jelebu	Rais Yatim (S46)	11,710	44.42%	Yunus Rahmat (UMNO)	14,650	55.58%	27,830	2,940	77.34%
1999	P113 Jelebu	Rais Yatim (UMNO)	17,028	63.21%	Jaafar Muhammad (KeADILan)	9,909	36.79%	28,236	7,119	75.65%
2004	P126 Jelebu	Rais Yatim (UMNO)	20,650	77.87%	Rosli Yaakop (PAS)	5,870	22.13%	27,470	14,780	72.83%
2008	P126 Jelebu	Rais Yatim (UMNO)	19,737	70.83%	Norman Ipin (PAS)	8,127	29.17%	29,029	11,610	75.05%

Negeri Sembilan State Legislative Assembly
Year	Constituency	Candidate	Votes	Pct	Opponent(s)	Votes	Pct	Ballots cast	Majority	Turnout
1978	N02 Pertang	Rais Yatim (UMNO)								
1990	N06 Batu Kikir	Rais Yatim (S46)	1,833	37.33%	Lilah Yasin (UMNO)	3,077	62.67%	5,144	1,244	74.80%

== Honours ==
=== Honours of Malaysia ===
- Malaysia
  - Commander of the Order of Loyalty to the Crown of Malaysia (PSM) – Tan Sri (2013)
- Kelantan
  - Knight Grand Commander of the Order of the Life of the Crown of Kelantan (SJMK) – Dato' (2002)
- Perlis
  - Knight Grand Commander of the Order of the Crown of Perlis (SPMP) – Dato' Seri (2010)
- Pahang
  - Grand Knight of the Order of Sultan Ahmad Shah of Pahang (SSAP) – Dato' Sri (2005)
- Negeri Sembilan
  - Knight Grand Commander of the Order of Loyalty to Negeri Sembilan (SPNS) – Dato' Seri Utama (2001, revoked 30 July 2026)
  - Knight Companion of the Order of Loyalty to Negeri Sembilan (DSNS) – Dato' (1979, revoked 30 July 2026)
- Sabah
  - Grand Commander of the Order of Kinabalu (SPDK) – Datuk Seri Panglima (2010)

== Books ==
Rais is also an author and has written extensively on the subject of law, politics and the community where a total of 19 books have been produced by him to date.

- Pola-Pola Antropologi, Dewan Bahasa Pustaka, Kuala Lumpur, 1973 (Translation).
- The Hierarchy of Adat Perpatih in Negeri Sembilan (1974).
- Faces in the Corridors of Power – A Pictorial Depiction of Malaysians in Position of Power Pelanduk Publications, Lumpur (1987)
- Freedom Under Executive Power in Malaysia, Endowment Publications, Kuala Lumpur (1995)
- Zaman Beredar Pusaka Bergilir (2000).
- Jelebak-Jelebu : Corat-Coret Anak Kampung, Dawama Kuala Lumpur 2004.
- Cabinet Governing in Malaysia, (2006), Dawama, Kuala Lumpur
- Perjuangan Pri-Bumi (2009).
- Perjuangan Asas Bangsa (2009).
- Kabinet 1Malaysia: Mengimbas Kembali Tadbir Urus Kabinet (2011).
- 1Malaysia Cabinet: Reflecting on Cabinet Governing (2011).
- King Ghaz: A Man of His Time (Ed.) 2011.
- Tunku: Still the Greatest Malaysian (Ed.) 2012.
- Pantun & Bahasa Indah: Jendela Budaya Melayu (2013).
- Meniti Badai Perjuangan (2013).
- Adat: The Legacy of Minangkabau (2015).
- Antara Cakap dan Fikir (2019).
- Peribahasa Melayu-Cina (2020).
- Budi Asas Tamadun (2021).

== See also ==
- List of people who have served in both Houses of the Malaysian Parliament

Political offices
Preceded by Mansor Othman	8th Menteri Besar of Negeri Sembilan; 12 July 1978 – 29 April 1982	Succeeded by Mohd Isa Abdul Samad
Preceded by Shariff Ahmad	Minister of Land and Regional Development; 30 April 1982 - 16 July 1984	Succeeded by Mohd Adib Mohamad Adam
Preceded by Mohd Adib Mohamad Adam	Minister of Information; 16 July 1982 - 10 August 1986	Succeeded by Tengku Ahmad Rithauddeen Ismail
Preceded by Tengku Ahmad Rithauddeen Ismail	Minister of Foreign Affairs; 11 August 1986 - 7 May 1987	Succeeded by Abu Hassan Omar
Preceded by Tajol Rosli Mohd Ghazali	Minister in the Prime Minister's Department; 15 December 1999 - 26 March 2004	Succeeded by Mohamed Nazri Abdul Aziz
Preceded by Abdul Kadir Sheikh Fadzir	Minister of Arts, Culture and Heritage; 27 March 2004 - 18 March 2008	Succeeded by Shafie Apdal
Preceded by Syed Hamid Albar	Minister of Foreign Affairs; 19 March 2008 - 8 April 2009	Succeeded by Anifah Aman
Preceded by Ahmad Shabery Cheek	Minister of Information, Communications, Arts and Culture; 10 April 2009 - 15 May 2013	Succeeded by Ahmad Shabery Cheek
Preceded by Vigneswaran Sanasee	President of the Dewan Negara; 2 September 2020 - 15 June 2023	Succeeded by Wan Junaidi Tuanku Jaafar
Academic offices
Preceded by Mohd Sidek Hassan	President of International Islamic University Malaysia; 2 June 2013 - 1 June 2018	Succeeded by Maszlee Malik
