= Klawang =

Political subdivision in Malaysia

Klawang (N04)
Negeri Sembilan constituency

State constituency
- Legislature: Negeri Sembilan State Legislative Assembly
MLA
Dannis Rais
PN
- Constituency created: 1984
- First contested: 1986
- Last contested: 2026

Demographics
- Electors (2023): 13,163

N04 Klawang within Negeri Sembilan, as used for the 2023 and 2026 state elections

Klawang is a state constituency in Negeri Sembilan, Malaysia, that has been represented in the Negeri Sembilan State Legislative Assembly.

The state constituency was first contested in 1986 and is mandated to return a single Assemblyman to the Negeri Sembilan State Legislative Assembly under the first-past-the-post voting system.

== Demographics ==
Ethnic breakdown of Klawang's electorate as of 2026
1. Malay (66.3%)
2. Chinese (27.4%)
3. Indian (3.70%)
4. Other ethnicities (2.70%)

== History ==
=== Polling districts ===
According to the gazette issued on 23 July 2026, the Klawang constituency has a total of 7 polling districts.

| State constituency | Polling districts | Code | Location |
|---|---|---|---|
| Klawang (N04) | Peradong | 126/04/01 | SK Peradong |
| Klawang (N04) | Ladang Jelebu | 126/04/02 | MRSM Kuala Klawang |
| Klawang (N04) | Kampong Kampai | 126/04/03 | SK Kampai |
| Klawang (N04) | Kampung Kuala Klawang | 126/04/04 | SK Kuala Klawang |
| Klawang (N04) | Pekan Kuala Klawang | 126/04/05 | SK Undang Jelebu |
| Klawang (N04) | Kampong Kemin | 126/04/06 | Dewan Orang Ramai Kampung Batu Serampai |
| Klawang (N04) | Kampung Amar Penghulu | 126/04/07 | SK Amar Penghulu |

=== Representation history ===
Members of the Legislative Assembly for Klawang
| Assembly | No | Years | Name | Party |
Constituency created from Kuala Klawang
| 7th | N02 | 1986-1990 | Shamsul Bahari @ Ramli Mat | BN (UMNO) |
| 8th | N02 | 1990-1995 | Shamsul Bahari @ Ramli Mat | BN (UMNO) |
| 9th | N02 | 1995-1999 | Shamsul Bahari @ Ramli Mat | BN (UMNO) |
| 10th | N02 | 1999-2004 | Shamsul Bahari @ Ramli Mat | BN (UMNO) |
| 11th | N04 | 2004-2008 | Jalaluddin Alias | BN (UMNO) |
| 12th | N04 | 2008-2013 | Yunus Rahmat | BN (UMNO) |
| 13th | N04 | 2013-2018 | Yunus Rahmat | BN (UMNO) |
| 14th | N04 | 2018-2023 | Bakri Sawir | PH (AMANAH) |
| 15th | N04 | 2023–2026 | Bakri Sawir | PH (AMANAH) |
| 16th | N04 | 2026–present | Danni Rais | PN (WAWASAN) |

== Election results ==
Negeri Sembilan state election, 2026: Klawang
| Party | Candidate | Votes | % | ∆% |
|---|---|---|---|---|
| PN | Danni Rais | 5,310 | 53.90 | ▲9.14 |
| PH | Bakri Sawir | 3,993 | 40.53 | ▼10.66 |
| BERSATU | Muhammad Adib Musa | 549 | 5.57 | ▲5.57 |
| Total valid votes | | 9,852 | 100.00 | |
| Total rejected ballots | | 117 | | |
| Unreturned ballots | | 10 | | |
| Turnout | | 9,979 | 74.72 | ▲5.79 |
| Registered electors | | 13,355 | | |
| Majority | | 1,317 | 13.37 | ▲6.94 |
| PN gain from PH | | Swing | | ? |

Negeri Sembilan state election, 2023: Klawang
| Party | Candidate | Votes | % | ∆% |
|---|---|---|---|---|
| PH | Bakri Sawir | 4,598 | 51.19 | ▲51.19 |
| PN | Danni Rais | 4,021 | 44.76 | ▲44.76 |
| Independent | Saiful Bahri Jaaman @ Sharman | 364 | 4.05 | ▲4.05 |
| Total valid votes | | 8,983 | 100.00 | |
| Total rejected ballots | | 80 | | |
| Unreturned ballots | | 10 | | |
| Turnout | | 9,073 | 68.93 | ▼14.19 |
| Registered electors | | 13,163 | | |
| Majority | | 577 | 6.43 | ▼5.25 |
| PH hold | | Swing | | |

Negeri Sembilan state election, 2018: Klawang
| Party | Candidate | Votes | % | ∆% |
|---|---|---|---|---|
| PKR | Bakri Sawir | 4,296 | 51.39 | ▲51.39 |
| BN | Baharudin Jali | 3,320 | 39.71 | ▼12.07 |
| PAS | Mazly Yasin | 744 | 8.90 | ▼39.32 |
| Total valid votes | | 8,360 | 100.00 | |
| Total rejected ballots | | 97 | | |
| Unreturned ballots | | 74 | | |
| Turnout | | 8,531 | 83.12 | ▼1.94 |
| Registered electors | | 10,264 | | |
| Majority | | 976 | 11.68 | ▲8.12 |
| PKR gain from BN | | Swing | | ? |

Negeri Sembilan state election, 2013: Klawang
| Party | Candidate | Votes | % | ∆% |
|---|---|---|---|---|
| BN | Yunus Rahmat | 4,104 | 51.78 | ▼5.33 |
| PAS | Rosli Yaakop | 3,822 | 48.22 | ▲5.33 |
| Total valid votes | | 7,926 | 100.00 | |
| Total rejected ballots | | 122 | | |
| Unreturned ballots | | 28 | | |
| Turnout | | 8,076 | 85.06 | ▲10.73 |
| Registered electors | | 9,494 | | |
| Majority | | 282 | 3.56 | ▼10.64 |
| BN hold | | Swing | | |

Negeri Sembilan state election, 2008: Klawang
| Party | Candidate | Votes | % | ∆% |
|---|---|---|---|---|
| BN | Yunus Rahmat | 3,379 | 57.11 | |
| PAS | Saiful Bahri Jaaman | 2,538 | 42.89 | |
| Total valid votes | | 5,917 | 100.00 | |
| Total rejected ballots | | 189 | | |
| Unreturned ballots | | 173 | | |
| Turnout | | 6,279 | 74.33 | |
| Registered electors | | 8,448 | | |
| Majority | | 841 | 14.22 | |
| BN hold | | Swing | | |

Negeri Sembilan state election, 2004: Klawang
| Party | Candidate | Votes | % | ∆% |
|---|---|---|---|---|
| BN | Jalaluddin Alias | 3,555 | 61.27 | ▲10.70 |
| PAS | Sharman Abu | 2,247 | 38.73 | ▲38.73 |
| Total valid votes | | 5,802 | 100.00 | |
| Total rejected ballots | | 157 | | |
| Unreturned ballots | | 6 | | |
| Turnout | | 5,965 | 69.76 | ▼2.79 |
| Registered electors | | 8,551 | | |
| Majority | | 1,308 | 22.54 | ▲21.40 |
| BN hold | | Swing | | |

Negeri Sembilan state election, 1999: Klawang
| Party | Candidate | Votes | % | ∆% |
|---|---|---|---|---|
| BN | Shamsul Bahari Mat | 3,045 | 50.57 | ▼9.51 |
| PKR | Bohari Abd. Latif | 2,976 | 49.43 | ▲49.43 |
| Total valid votes | | 6,021 | 100.00 | |
| Total rejected ballots | | 151 | | |
| Unreturned ballots | | 25 | | |
| Turnout | | 6,197 | 72.55 | ▼1.87 |
| Registered electors | | 8,542 | | |
| Majority | | 69 | 1.15 | ▼20.17 |
| BN hold | | Swing | | |

Negeri Sembilan state election, 1995: Klawang
| Party | Candidate | Votes | % | ∆% |
|---|---|---|---|---|
| BN | Shamsul Bahari Mat | 3,757 | 60.08 | ▲3.27 |
| S46 | Ibrahim Che Mat | 2,424 | 38.77 | ▼4.42 |
| Independent | Abdul Hamid Tinggal | 72 | 1.15 | ▲1.15 |
| Total valid votes | | 6,253 | 100.00 | |
| Total rejected ballots | | 185 | | |
| Unreturned ballots | | 36 | | |
| Turnout | | 6,474 | 74.41 | ▼4.14 |
| Registered electors | | 8,700 | | |
| Majority | | 1,333 | 21.32 | ▲7.69 |
| BN hold | | Swing | | |

Negeri Sembilan state election, 1990: Klawang
| Party | Candidate | Votes | % | ∆% |
|---|---|---|---|---|
| BN | Shamsul Bahari Mat | 3,056 | 56.81 | ▼19.92 |
| S46 | Ibrahim Che Mat | 2,323 | 43.19 | ▲43.19 |
| Total valid votes | | 5,379 | 100.00 | |
| Total rejected ballots | | 148 | | |
| Unreturned ballots | | 18 | | |
| Turnout | | 5,545 | 78.55 | ▲9.06 |
| Registered electors | | 7,059 | | |
| Majority | | 733 | 13.63 | ▼39.85 |
| BN hold | | Swing | | |

Negeri Sembilan state election, 1986: Klawang
| Party | Candidate | Votes | % |
|---|---|---|---|
| BN | Shamsul Bahari Mat | 3,312 | 76.74 |
| PAS | Ishak Md. Nazir | 1,004 | 23.26 |
| Total valid votes | | 4,316 | 100.00 |
| Total rejected ballots | | 203 | |
| Unreturned ballots | | 0 | |
| Turnout | | 4,519 | 69.49 |
| Registered electors | | 6,503 | |
| Majority | | 2,308 | 53.48 |
This was a new constituency created.

== Sources ==
"14th General Election Malaysia (GE14 / PRU14) - Negeri Sembilan". election.thestar.com.my.
