= Kartiyaini Jeyapalan =

Malaysian politician

Yang Berhormat Puan Kartiyaini Jeyapalan
- கார்த்தியாயினி ஜெயபாலன்

Member of the Johor State Legislative Assembly for Skudai
- Incumbent
- Assumed office 11 July 2026
- Preceded by: Marina Ibrahim
- Majority: 15,280 (2026)

Second Deputy Chairperson of the Democratic Action Party (DAP) Johor Women
- Incumbent
- Assumed office 2025 Serving with Ng Kor Sim (Deputy Chairperson I)
- Chairperson: Gan Peck Cheng

Chief of Staff in the Perling Johor State Assembly Representative's Office
- Incumbent
- Assumed office 2025
- Assemblyman: Liew Chin Tong

Assistant Organising Secretary of the Democratic Action Party Johor State Committee
- Incumbent
- Assumed office 2024 Serving with Boon Sin Wei
- State Chairperson: Teo Nie Ching
- Preceded by: Ho Bao Kheong

Political Secretary to the Member of the Perak State Legislative Assembly for Buntong
- In office 2022–2024
- Assemblywoman: Thulsi Manogaran

Special Officer to the Johor State Executive Council Member (Consumer Affairs, Human Resources and Unity)
- In office 16 May 2018 – 27 February 2020
- State Executive Councillor: Ramakrishnan Suppiah

Personal details
- Born: Kartiyaini A/P Jeyapalan Skudai, Johor, Malaysia
- Citizenship: Malaysian
- Party: Democratic Action Party (DAP)
- Other political affiliations: Pakatan Harapan (PH)
- Education: University of Malaya (Bachelor of Laws)
- Occupation: Politician
- Profession: Lawyer

Kartiyaini A/P Jeyapalan (Tamil: கார்த்தியாயினி ஜெயபாலன்) is a Malaysian politician and lawyer who serves as the assemblywoman for Skudai in the Johor State Legislative Assembly, the Second Deputy Chairperson of the Democratic Action Party (DAP) Johor Women and the Assistant Organising Secretary of the Johor DAP State Committee. A member of the Democratic Action Party (DAP), a component party of the Pakatan Harapan (PH) coalition, she has held various political and administrative positions within the party and the Johor state government.

She previously served as Special Officer to the Johor State Executive Council member overseeing the Consumer Affairs, Human Resources and Unity portfolio from 2018 to 2020, before serving as Political Secretary to the Member of the Perak State Legislative Assembly for Buntong from 2022 to 2024. Since 2025, she has served as the Chief of the Perling Johor State Assembly Representative's Office under Johor state assemblyman Liew Chin Tong.

== Early life and education ==
Jeyapalan received her education at SJK (T) Tun Aminah and subsequently at SMK Skudai. She later pursued law studies at the University of Malaya and obtained a Bachelor of Laws (LLB) degree. In 2015, she was admitted as an advocate and solicitor of the High Court of Malaya.

== Political career ==
On 22 June 2026, Kartiyaini Jeyapalan was announced as the Pakatan Harapan candidate for the Skudai seat in the 2026 Johor state election.

On 11 July 2026, Kartiyaini Jeyapalan won the Skudai seat in the 2026 Johor state election and became an assemblywoman in the Johor State Legislative Assembly.
