= Kluang District =

District in Johor, Malaysia

- District of Johor
- Daerah Kluang
- Flag

- Location of Kluang District in Johor
- Interactive map of Kluang District
- Location of Kluang District in Malaysia
- Coordinates: 2°2′1″N 103°19′10″E
- Country: Malaysia
- State: Johor
- Seat: Kluang
- Local area government(s): Kluang Municipal Council (Kluang North); Simpang Renggam District Council (Kluang South)

Government
  - District officer: Haji Ismail bin Abu

Area
  - Total: 2,864.53 km^{2} (1,106.00 sq mi)

Population (2020)
  - Total: 323,762
  - Density: 113.024/km^{2} (292.732/sq mi)
- Time zone: UTC+8 (MST)
  - Summer (DST): UTC+8 (Not observed)
- Postcode: 86xxx
- Calling code: +6-07
- Vehicle registration plates: J

Kluang is a district in Johor, Malaysia. Its district capital is Kluang Town. Kluang district is one of the three landlocked districts in Johor, the other being Segamat and Kulai.

== Geography ==
Kluang District is 2,851.64 km^{2} in size.

Kluang District is bordered by Segamat in the north, Batu Pahat in the west and Mersing in the east. The southern border of Kluang district meets Pontian, Kulai and Kota Tinggi. As the central district, it borders the most districts in Johor.

== Administrative divisions ==

Kluang District is divided into eight mukims, which are:

Type	UPI Code	Name	Population (2020 Census)	Area (km2)	Density (km2 per person)
Mukim	010301	Ulu Benut	32,226	104.3	308.9
Mukim	010302	Kahang	11,411	551.5	20.69
Mukim	010303	Kluang	178,773	617.4	289.6
Mukim	010304	Layang-Layang	12,564	229.3	54.79
Mukim	010305	Machap	5,770	120.6	47.84
Mukim	010306	Niyor	6,092	251.9	24.18
Mukim	010307	Paloh	12,677	430.1	29.48
Mukim	010308	Renggam	36,477	556.8	65.52
Town (Bandar)	010340	Kluang	26,191	10.92	2,398
Town (Bandar)	010341	Paloh	571	0.2427	2,353
Town (Bandar)	010342	Renggam	1,010	0.5657	1,785

Kluang Municipal Council

- Kahang
- Kluang Town
- Niyor
- Paloh

Simpang Renggam District Council

- Layang-Layang
- Machap
- Renggam
- Ulu Benut

== Government ==
Kluang is divided into two local councils namely Simpang Renggam District Council (Malay: Majlis Daerah Simpang Renggam) based at Simpang Renggam Town and Kluang Municipal Council (Malay: Majlis Perbandaran Kluang) based at Kluang Town which is also the district capital.

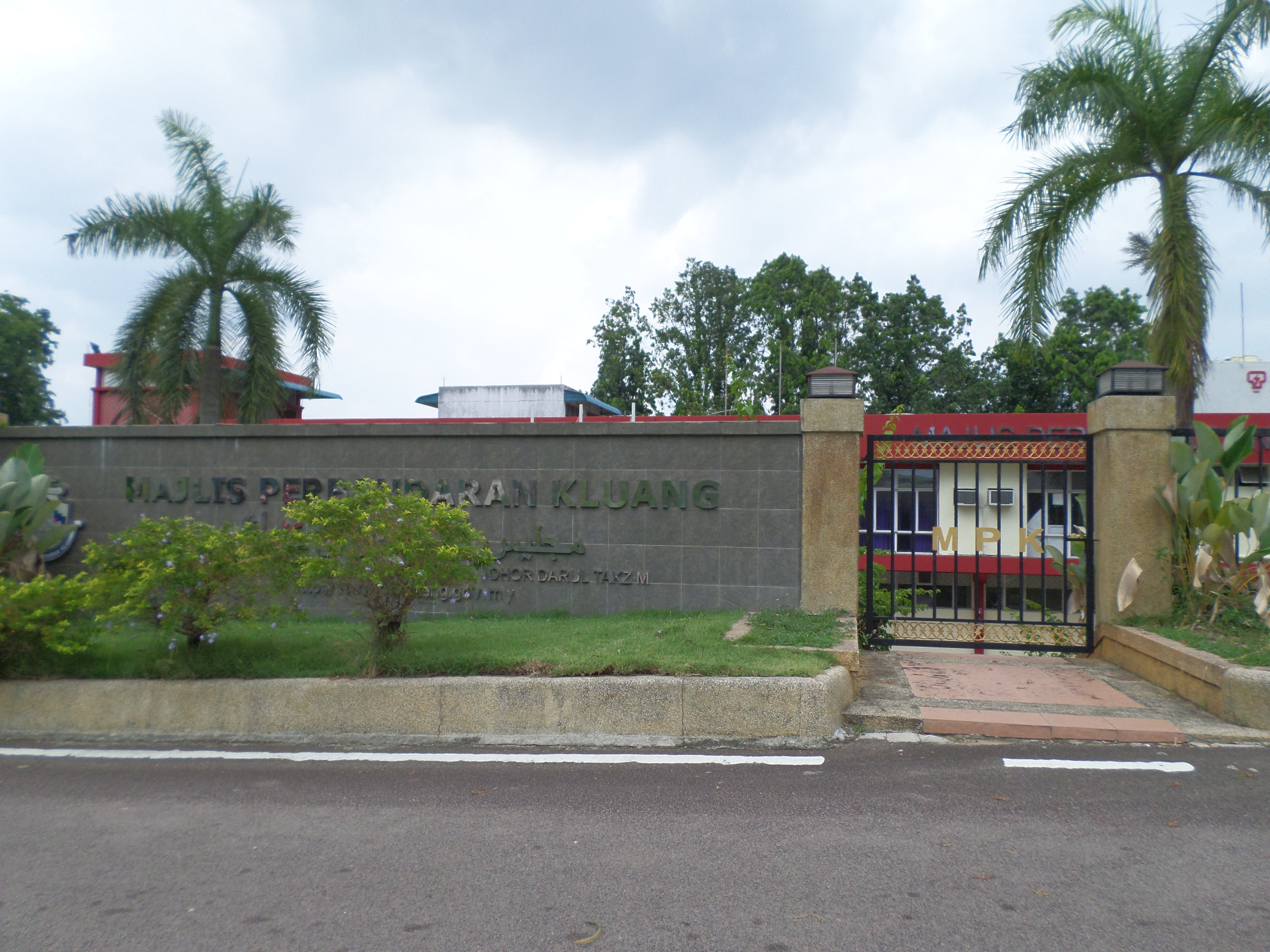
Kluang Municipal Council

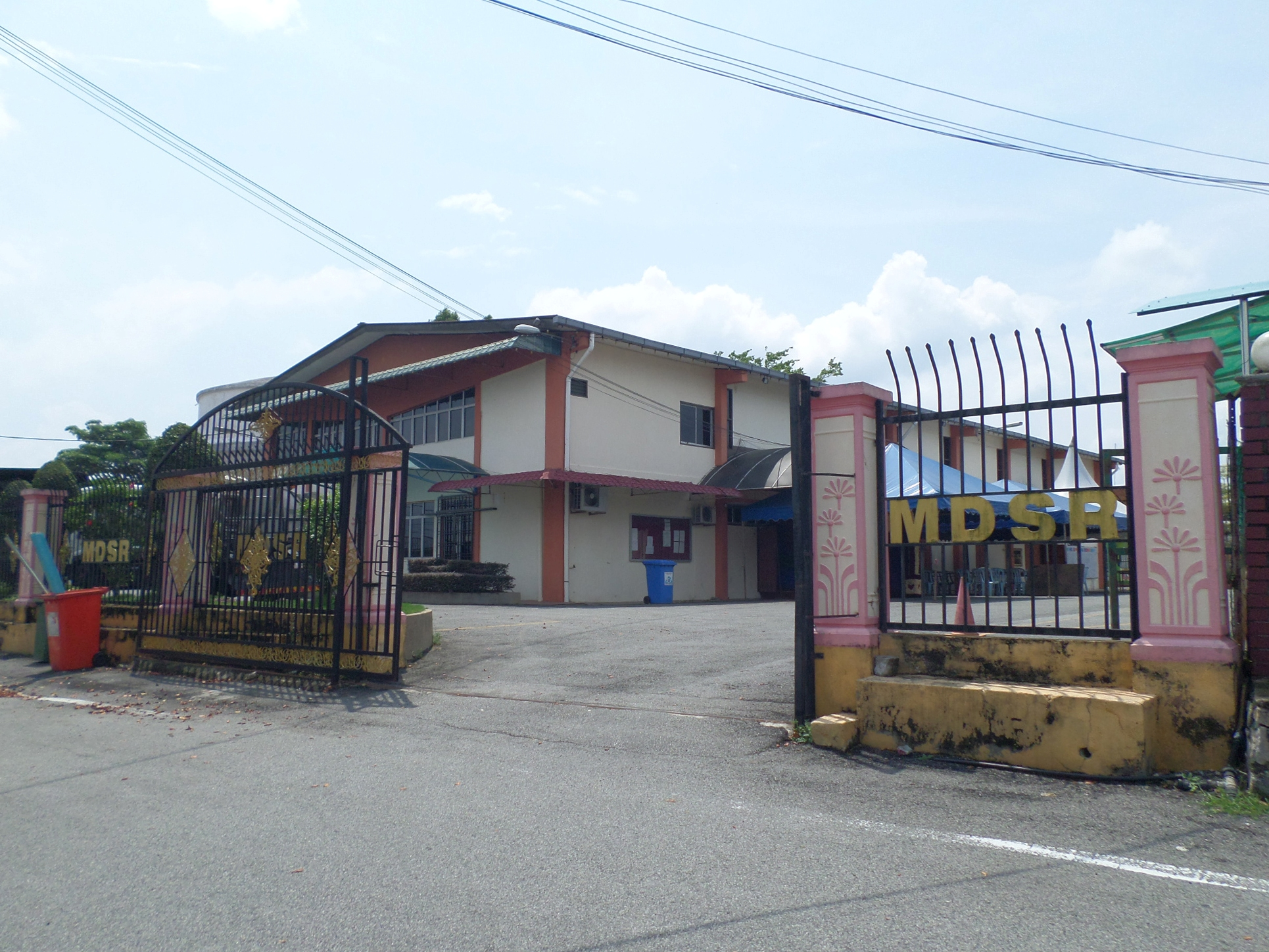
Simpang Renggam District Council

== Towns ==
- Paloh
- Kahang
- Renggam
- Machap
- Simpang Renggam
- Layang-Layang

== Federal Parliament and State Assembly Seats ==
List of Kluang district representatives in the Federal Parliament (Dewan Rakyat)

Parliament	Seat Name	Member of Parliament	Party
P151	Simpang Renggam	Hasni Mohammad	Barisan Nasional (UMNO)
P152	Kluang	Wong Shu Qi	Pakatan Harapan (DAP)
P153	Sembrong	Hishammuddin Hussein	Barisan Nasional (UMNO)

List of Kluang district representatives in the State Legislative Assembly (Dewan Undangan Negeri)

Parliament	State	Seat Name	State Assemblyman	Party
P151	N26	Machap	Onn Hafiz Ghazi	Barisan Nasional (UMNO)
P151	N27	Layang-Layang	Abd Mutalip Abd Rahim	Barisan Nasional (UMNO)
P152	N28	Mengkibol	Chew Chong Sin	Pakatan Harapan (DAP)
P152	N29	Mahkota	Sharifah Azizah Syed Zain	Barisan Nasional (UMNO)
P153	N30	Paloh	Lee Ting Han	Barisan Nasional (MCA)
P153	N31	Kahang	Vidyananthan Ramanadhan	Barisan Nasional (MIC)

== Demographics ==
Historical population
Year	Pop.	±%
1991	224,424	—
2000	255,601	+13.9%
2010	288,364	+12.8%
2020	323,762	+12.3%

As of 2020, total population of Kluang District is 323,762 people. In 2000, the population growth was 1.48%.

== Economy ==
The main economy activities in the district are agriculture and ecotourism. Main industrial areas are located in Kluang Town, Paloh, Renggam, Simpang Renggam, Machap, Kahang, Ulu Benut, and Layang-Layang.

== Education ==
Kluang district has 28 Malay primary schools, 21 Chinese primary schools, 17 Tamil primary schools, and 20 secondary schools for a total of 86 schools. In 2014, there were more than 38,000 students and 3,300 teachers.

== Transportation ==
- Kluang Airport

== See also ==
- List of districts in Malaysia
