= Ng Lam Hua =

Malaysian politician

- 黃南華

Member of the Johor State Legislative Assembly for Mengkibol
- In office 2008–2013
- Preceded by: Gan Ping Sieu
- Succeeded by: Tan Hong Pin

Personal details
- Born: Ng Lam Hua; 8 September 1949 Yong Peng, Johor, Malaysia
- Died: 29 September 2013 (aged 64) Taman Sri Kluang, Kluang, Johor, Malaysia
- Citizenship: Malaysian
- Party: DAP
- Other political affiliations: Pakatan Rakyat
- Occupation: Lawyer; Politician

Ng Lam Hua (Chinese: 黃南華; pinyin: Huáng Nánhuá; Jyutping: Wong4 Naam4 Waa6; Pe̍h-ōe-jī: N̂g Lâm-hôa) was a Malaysian politician from DAP. He was the Member of Johor State Legislative Assembly for Mengkibol from 2008 to 2013.

== Politics ==
He was the Chief of DAP Kluang division and Taman Intan branch. He was dropped as the candidate for Mengkibol in the 2013 Malaysian general election and was promised to be named as a candidate for another constituency by Lim Guan Eng, but the promise was not kept.

== Election result ==
Parliament of Malaysia
Year	Constituency	Candidate	Votes	Pct	Opponent(s)	Votes	Pct	Ballots cast	Majority	Turnout
2004	P152 Kluang	Ng Lam Hua (DAP)	14,303	30.24%	Hoo Seong Chang (MCA)	33,001	69.76%	49,662	18,698	73.60%
2008	P152 Kluang	Ng Lam Hua (DAP)	24,189	46.38%	Hou Kok Chung (MCA)	27,970	53.62%	52,159	3,781	76.60%

Johor State Legislative Assembly
Year	Constituency	Candidate	Votes	Pct	Opponent(s)	Votes	Pct	Ballots cast	Majority	Turnout
2004	N28 Mengkibol	Ng Lam Hua (DAP)	8,091	31.16%	Gan Ping Sieu (MCA)	17,186	66.18%	25,970	9,095	74.81%
2008	N28 Mengkibol	Ng Lam Hua (DAP)	13,538	50.67%	Gan Ping Sieu (MCA)	12,257	45.88%	26,717	1,281	75.79
2013	N28 Mengkibol	Ng Lam Hua (IND)	85	0.23%	Tan Hong Pin (DAP)	23,036	62.66%	36,763	10,001	86.70%
2013	N28 Mengkibol	Ng Lam Hua (IND)	85	0.23%	Chye Kwee Yeow (MCA)	13,035	35.46%	36,763	10,001	86.70%

== Health ==
He died of a heart attack at his house on 29 September 2013.
