= Alan Tee Boon Tsong =

Malaysian politician

- 郑凯聪

Member of the Johor State Legislative Assembly for Senai
- In office 28 June 2018 – 22 January 2022
- Preceded by: Wong Shu Qi
- Succeeded by: Wong Bor Yang

Personal details
- Born: Alan Tee Boon Tsong
- Citizenship: Malaysian
- Party: DAP
- Other political affiliations: Pakatan Harapan
- Occupation: Politician

Chinese name
- Traditional Chinese: 鄭凱聰
- Simplified Chinese: 郑凯聪
Transcriptions
Standard Mandarin
- Hanyu Pinyin: Zhèng Kǎicōng
Yue: Cantonese
- Jyutping: Zeng6 Hoi2 Cung1
Southern Min
- Hokkien POJ: Tēⁿ Khái-chhong
- Tâi-lô: Tēnn Khái-tshong

Tee Boon Tsong (Chinese: 鄭凱聰) is a Malaysian politician from DAP. He has served as the Member of Johor State Legislative Assembly for Senai from 2018 to 2022.

== Politics ==
He was the political secretary for Liew Chin Tong before becoming the state assemblyman for Senai.

== Election results ==
Johor State Legislative Assembly
| Year | Constituency | Candidate | Votes | Pct. | Opponent(s) | Votes | Pct. | Ballots cast | Majority | Turnout |
|---|---|---|---|---|---|---|---|---|---|---|
| 2018 | N52 Senai | Tee Boon Tsong (DAP) | 28,274 | 73.97% | Shen Poh Kuan (MCA) | 9,372 | 24.52% | 38,225 | 18,902 | 85.60% |
| 2022 | N19 Yong Peng | Tee Boon Tsong (DAP) | 7,129 | 37.49% | Ling Tian Soon (MCA) | 9,870 | 51.90% | 19,017 | 2,741 | 57.53% |
| 2022 | N19 Yong Peng | Tee Boon Tsong (DAP) | 7,129 | 37.49% | Susan Yong Hui Ling (GERAKAN) | 1,681 | 8.84% | 19,017 | 2,741 | 57.53% |
| 2026 | N46 Perling | Tee Boon Tsong (DAP) | 31,857 | 46.63% | Pannir Selvam Paliksina Siwalinggam (MIC) | 33,468 | 48.99% | 68,321 | 1,611 | 62.11% |
| 2026 | N46 Perling | Tee Boon Tsong (DAP) | 31,857 | 46.63% | Boo Wei Han (BERSAMA) | 2,996 | 4.39% | 68,321 | 1,611 | 62.11% |
