= Simpang Renggam =

- Town
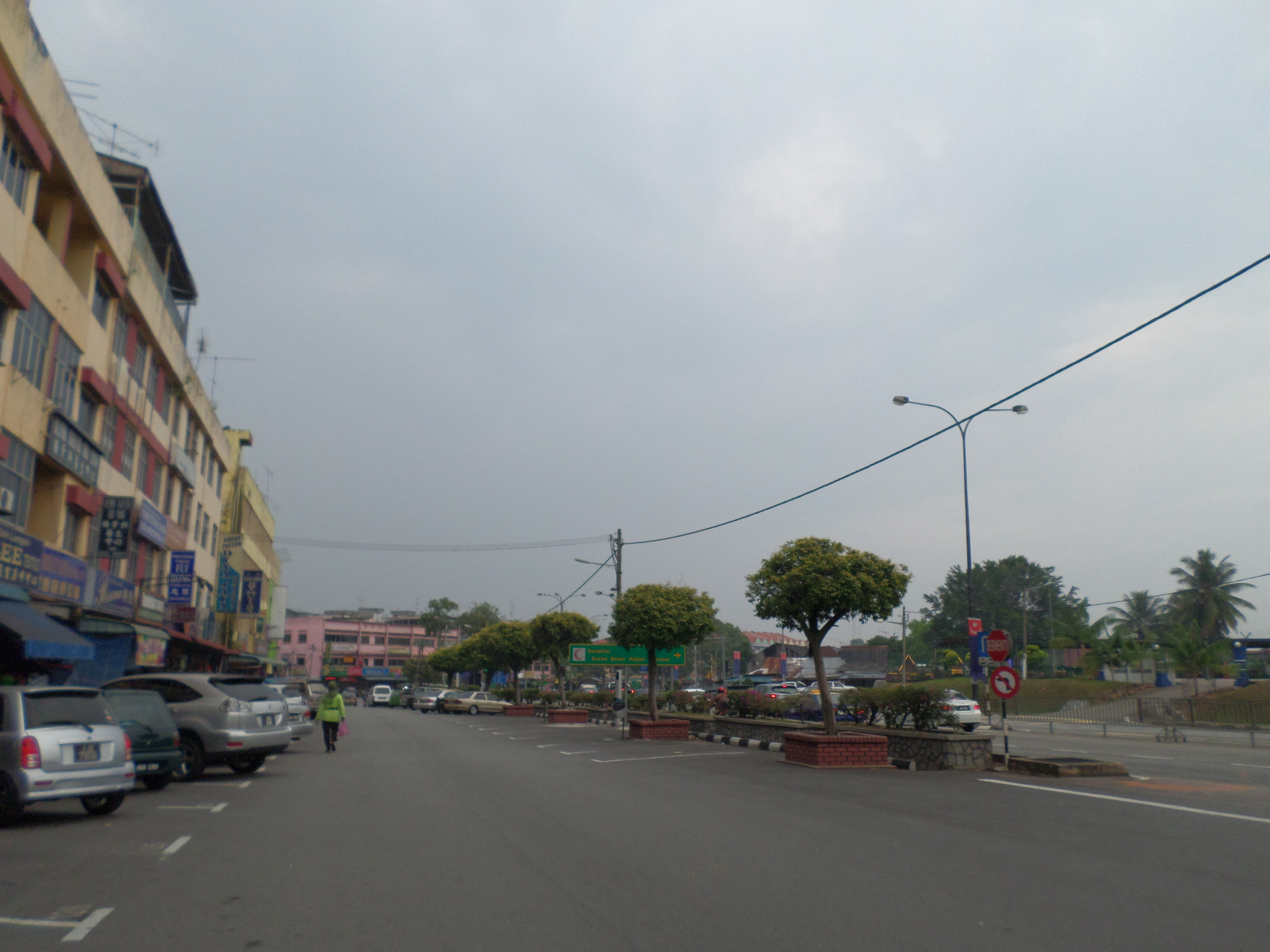

- Coat of arms
- Motto: Usaha Maju Jaya "Effort, Progress, Success" (motto of Simpang Renggam District Council)
- Interactive map of Simpang Renggam
- Coordinates: 1°50′N 103°19′E
- Country: Malaysia
- State: Johor
- District: Kluang
- Mukim: Ulu Benut; Layang-Layang; Renggam; Machap

Government
  - Type: Local government
  - Body: Simpang Renggam District Council
  - President: Mohd Izzul Helmi Ahmad (since 16 October 2025)

Area
  - Total: 1,002.47 km^{2} (387.06 sq mi)
  - Ulu Benut: 104.3 km^{2} (40.3 sq mi)

Population
  - Total: 88,047
  - Density: 87.83/km^{2} (227.5/sq mi)
- Postal code: 86200
- Website: www.mdsrenggam.gov.my

Simpang Renggam District Council Majlis Daerah Simpang Renggam
- Emblem

Type
- Type: Local authority of Simpang Renggam

History
- Founded: 1 September 1979
- Preceded by: Kluang South District Council

Leadership
- President: Mohd Izzul Helmi Ahmad (since 16 October 2025)
- Secretary: Mohamed Azahari Mohamed Rawi

Structure
- Seats: 24
- Political groups: Councillors: BN (24): UMNO (14); MCA (8); MIC (2)
- Length of term: 1 April 2024–31 December 2025

Motto
- Usaha Maju Jaya (Effort, Progress, Success)

Meeting place
- Simpang Renggam District Council Administrative Complex, Simpang Renggam

Website
- www.mdsrenggam.gov.my

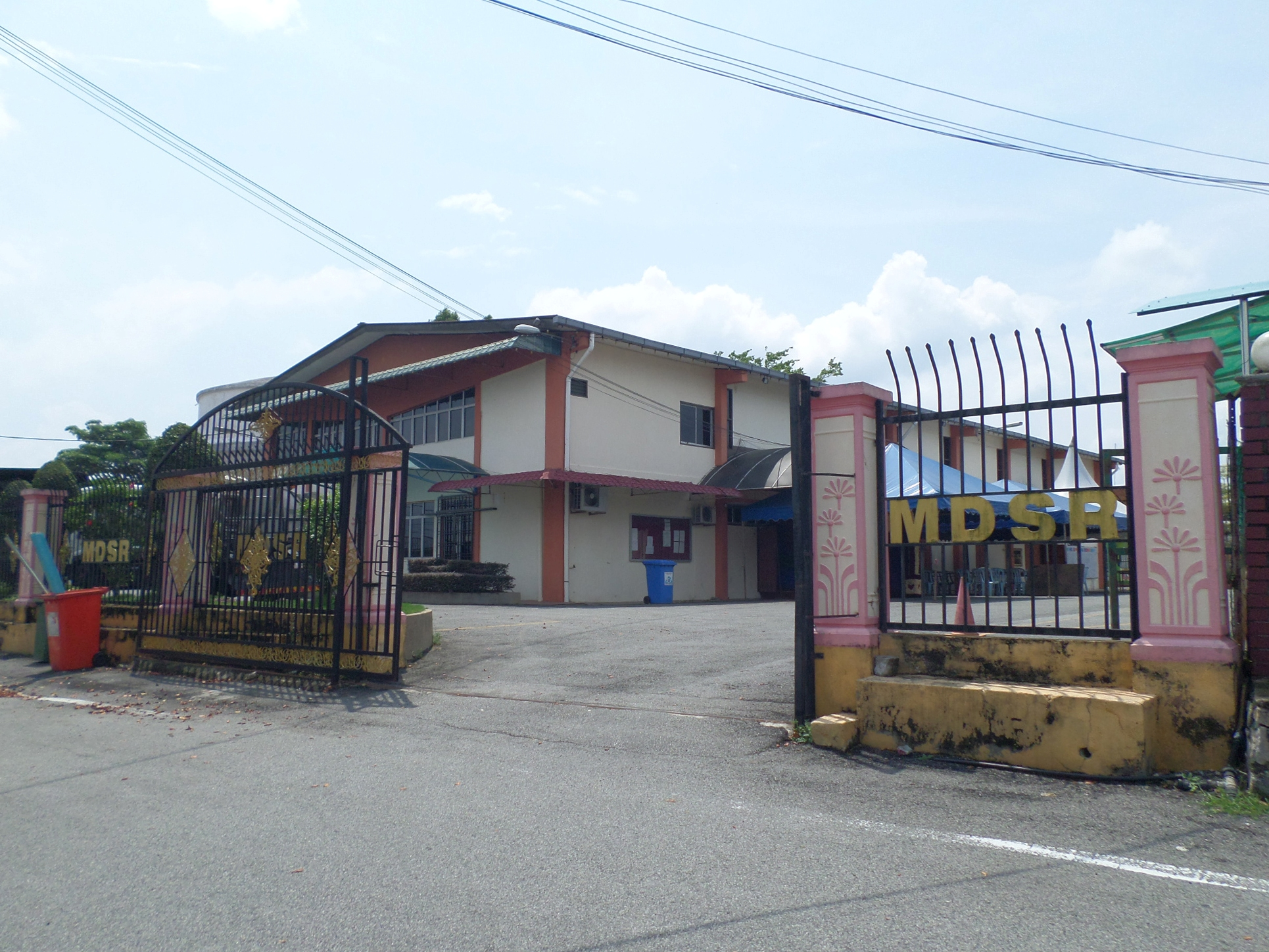
Former Simpang Renggam District Council headquarters

Simpang Renggam (lit. 'harvest junction') is a town and municipality in Kluang District in central Johor, Malaysia. It spans over an area of 1,002.47 km^{2}, with town centre in Ulu Benut Mukim.

== Government and politics ==
Simpang Renggam District Council (Malay: Majlis Daerah Simpang Renggam), formerly Kluang South District Council (Malay: Majlis Daerah Kluang Selatan) until 1 January 2001, is the local authority of Simpang Renggam and other towns of the southern half of Kluang region, including the nearby towns of Renggam and Layang-Layang. The district council was formed on 1 September 1979 through the merger of the six local councils of Renggam, Simpang Renggam, Machap, Layang-Layang, Sungai Sayong and Taman Sri Lambak. Initially headquartered in Renggam, it was relocated to a two storey tall building in Simpang Renggam on 1 January 1996, and later a bigger modernised administrative complex on 21 January 2021 (although the former still serves as a Branch office for the district council).

=== Departments ===
- Management Services (Khidmat Pengurusan)
- Finance (Kewangan)
- Valuation & Property Management (Penilaian Dan Pengurusan Harta)
- Engineering (Kejuruteraan)
- Public Health (Kesihatan Awam)
- Urban Planning & Landscape (Perancangan Bandar Dan Landskap)
- Licensing & Enforcement (Pelesenan Dan Penguatkuasaan)
- Community Development (Pembangunan Masyarakat)

=== Units ===
- Internal Audit (Audit Dalam)
- Law (Undang-undang)
- One Stop Centre (Pusat Sehenti)
- Public Relations and Corporate (Perhubungan Awam dan Korporat)

=== Administration areas (zones) ===
As of 2025, Simpang Renggam is divided into 24 zones represented by 24 councillors to act as mediators between residents and the district council. The councillors for the 1 April 2024 to 31 December 2025 session are as below:

Zone	Councillor	Political affiliation
Simpang Renggam 1	Sharudin Sapari	UMNO
Simpang Renggam 2	Amira Abdul Hamid	UMNO
Simpang Renggam 3	Sarina Ayop	UMNO
Simpang Renggam 4	Chye Chuan Khang	MCA
Simpang Renggam 5	Jamari Atan	UMNO
Simpang Renggam 6	Mohamad Faizal Mat Said	UMNO
Simpang Renggam 7	Tee Keh Seng	MCA
Simpang Renggam 8	Saipul Radzuan Selamat	UMNO
Simpang Renggam 9	Subramaniam Solomuthoo	MIC
Simpang Renggam 10	Masruhin Abd Hadi	UMNO
Simpang Renggam 11	Wan Mohd Fazli Wan Ismail	UMNO
Simpang Renggam 12	Lai Wan Ching	MCA
Simpang Renggam 13	Muhamad Wafiy Jamion	UMNO
Renggam 1	Arshad A Said	UMNO
Renggam 2	Parlan Dollah Rahman	UMNO
Renggam 3	Chong Zheng Yi	MCA
Layang-Layang 1	Arikam Chengole	MIC
Layang-Layang 2	Yoeng Lan Yoke	MCA
Layang-Layang 3	Matsah Tarif	UMNO
Layang-Layang 4	Low Chou Li	MCA
Machap 1	Rafeah Abdullah	UMNO
Machap 2	Lim Kim Bock	MCA
Sungai Sayong	Wee Say Sai	MCA
Bandar T6	Sarudin Nasir	UMNO

== Prison ==
Simpang Renggam is home to the Johor Prison, which began construction in 1982 and completed in 1986. It has a capacity of 2,500 and includes a moral rehabilitation centre, special rehabilitation centre and a special detention centre.

== See also ==
- Renggam, approximately 12 km northeast
