= Cheo Yee How =

Malaysian politician

- 邹裕豪

Member of the Johor State Legislative Assembly for Pengkalan Rinting
- In office 2013–2018
- Preceded by: Chia Song Cheng
- Succeeded by: Constituency abolished

Member of the Johor State Legislative Assembly for Perling
- In office 2018–2022
- Preceded by: Constituency created
- Succeeded by: Liew Chin Tong

Personal details
- Born: Cheo Yee How; 23 September 1984 (age 41)
- Citizenship: Malaysian
- Party: DAP
- Other political affiliations: Pakatan Rakyat (till 2015); Pakatan Harapan (since 2015)
- Education: University Teknologi Malaysia
- Occupation: Politician

Cheo Yee How (Pe̍h-ōe-jī: Chau Jū-hô) is a Malaysian politician from DAP. He is the member of Johor State Legislative Assembly for Pengkalan Rinting from 2013 to 2018 and Perling from 2018 to 2022.

== Politics ==
He was the Special helper of DAP Gelang Patah Liaison Committee from 2008 to 2012.

== Election result ==
Johor State Legislative Assembly
Year	Constituency	Candidate	Votes	Pct.	Opponent(s)	Votes	Pct.	Ballots cast	Majority	Turnout
2013	N46 Pengkalan Rinting	Cheo Yee How (DAP)	26,464	50.78%	Chang Mei Kee (MCA)	24,494	47.00%	52,113	1,970	85.13%
2018	N46 Perling	Cheo Yee How (DAP)	32,592	62.41%	Wong You Fong (MCA)	13,059	25.01%	52,222	19,533	83.03%
2018	N46 Perling	Cheo Yee How (DAP)	32,592	62.41%	Muhamad Nazrin Ihsan (PAS)	5,890	11.28%	52,222	19,533	83.03%
