= Pengkalan Rinting (state constituency) =

Johor constituency

Defunct state constituency
- Legislature: Johor State Legislative Assembly
- Constituency created: 2003
- Constituency abolished: 2018
- First contested: 2004
- Last contested: 2013

Pengkalan Rinting was a state constituency in Johor, Malaysia, that has been represented in the Johor State Legislative Assembly since 2004 until 2018.

The state constituency was created in the 2003 redistribution and is mandated to return a single member to the Johor State Legislative Assembly under the first past the post voting system.

== History ==
=== Representation history ===
Members of the Legislative Assembly for Pengkalan Rinting
Assembly	No	Years	Member	Party
Constituency created from Tambatan and Tanjong Kupang
11th	N46	2004–2008	Low Teh Hian (劉德賢)	BN (MCA)
12th	N46	2008-2013	Chia Song Cheng (謝松清)	BN (MCA)
13th	N46	2013–2015	Cheo Yee How (鄒裕豪)	PR (DAP)
13th	N46	2015–2018	Cheo Yee How (鄒裕豪)	PH (DAP)
Constituency renamed to Perling

== Election results ==
Johor state election, 2013
Party	Candidate	Votes	%	∆%
DAP	Cheo Yee How	26,464	50.78	▲50.78
BN	Chang Mei Kee	24,494	47.00	▼17.72
Total valid votes		50,958	97.78	
Total rejected ballots		1,063	2.04	
Unreturned ballots		92	0.18	
Turnout		52,113	85.13	
Registered electors		61,217		
Majority		1,970		
DAP gain from BN		Swing		-

Johor state election, 2008
Party	Candidate	Votes	%	∆%
BN	Chia Song Cheng	21,203	64.72	▼17.66
PAS	Rahmatullah Abdul	10,829	33.05	▲17.49
Total valid votes		32,032	97.77	
Total rejected ballots		610	1.86	
Unreturned ballots		121	0.37	
Turnout		32,763	70.21	
Registered electors		46,664		
Majority		10,374		
BN hold		Swing		▼17.58

Johor state election, 2004
Party	Candidate	Votes	%
BN	Low Teh Hian	23,321	82.38
PAS	Rahmatullah Abdul	4,403	15.56
Total valid votes		27,724	97.95
Total rejected ballots		541	1.91
Unreturned ballots		40	0.14
Turnout		28,305	67.54
Registered electors		41,909	
Majority		18,918	
This was a new constituency created.
