= Gan Ping Sieu =

Malaysian politician

- 颜炳寿

Deputy Minister of Youth and Sports II
- In office 4 June 2010 – 15 May 2013 Serving with Razali Ibrahim
- Monarchs: Mizan Zainal Abidin; Abdul Halim
- Prime Minister: Najib Razak
- Minister: Ahmad Shabery Cheek
- Preceded by: Wee Jeck Seng
- Succeeded by: Saravanan Murugan
- Constituency: Senator

Member of the Johor State Legislative Assembly for Mengkibol
- In office 21 March 2004 – 8 March 2008
- Preceded by: Ng Kim Lai (MCA–BN)
- Succeeded by: Ng Lam Hua (PR–DAP)
- Majority: 9,095 (2004)

Personal details
- Born: 18 April 1966 (age 60) Kluang, Johor, Malaysia.
- Citizenship: Malaysian
- Party: Malaysian Chinese Association (MCA)
- Other political affiliations: Barisan Nasional (BN)
- Education: University of London, Lincoln's Inn, International Islamic University Malaysia, University of Malaya
- Occupation: Politician
- Profession: Lawyer
- Website: Official Facebook

Gan Ping Sieu (simplified Chinese: 颜炳寿; traditional Chinese: 顏炳壽; Jyutping: Ngaan4 Bing2 Sau6; Pe̍h-ōe-jī: Gân Péng-siū, born April 18, 1966) is a Malaysian politician. He was elected as the Johor State Legislative Assemblyman for Mengkibol for one term from 2004 to 2008. He is a member of the Malaysian Chinese Association (MCA), a major component party in the Barisan Nasional (BN) coalition. From 2010 to 2013, he served as a Senator and Deputy Minister of Youth and Sports.

== Background ==
Kluang-born Gan Ping Sieu comes from a family with a long tradition of serving the community in the town and its surrounding areas. One of his uncles had served as a Kluang Member of Parliament, while another had served as an Assemblyman for Paloh. Ping Sieu's late father was a pioneer MCA member and a well-respected figure within Kluang Chinese society circles. Many of his relatives are still active in community work, whether as local councilors, village committees, or non-governmental organizations.

Over the decades, Ping Sieu has carried on the family tradition of serving the Kluang community. Among others, he had served as Kluang Municipal councillor; Committee Member of the Kluang Chinese Chamber of Commerce, Chong Hwa High School, and Vice President of the Kluang Chinese Association. Trained as a lawyer, he had also acted as a legal advisor to over 100 NGOs in Kluang. He was appointed Special Officer to the Johor Menteri Besar for DUN Mengkibol in 2008, a post that allowed him to bridge the community and government agencies more effectively.

In MCA, Ping Sieu was elected party Vice-President in 2010, where he served until 2013. He's currently the chairman of the party's Syariah Law and Policy Implementation Taskforce.

== Education ==
Ping Sieu graduated with a Bachelor's of Law degree from Queen Mary College, University of London. Having the knack for learning, he subsequently pursued a Diploma in Syariah Law at the International Islamic University and a Master's of Law from the University of Malaya.

== Currently ==
He is currently the co-president of the Centre for a Better Tomorrow (CENBET), a pro-moderation and good governance civil society group. Its other co-president is former Malaysian Bar Council president Dato' Lim Chee Wee. Ping Sieu had also served as the Panel Advisory Member of the National Service Training Programme (PLKN) between 2005 and 2009.

Ping Sieu is now heading a law firm with seventy-eight offices across the country, dealing in diverse areas such as corporate restructuring, conveyancing, civil and criminal litigation, land matters, and retail banking, among others. On January 8, 2024, he has joined the board of directors at Perwaja Holdings Bhd as an independent and non-executive director.

== Election results ==
Johor State Legislative Assembly
Year	Constituency	Candidate	Votes	Pct	Opponent(s)	Votes	Pct	Ballots cast	Majority	Turnout
2004	N28 Mengkibol	Gan Ping Sieu (MCA)	17,186	66.18%	Ng Lam Hua (DAP)	8,091	31.16%	25,970	9,095	74.81%
2008	N28 Mengkibol	Gan Ping Sieu (MCA)	12,257	45.50%	Ng Lam Hua (DAP)	13,538	50.67%	26,717	1,281	75.79%

Parliament of Malaysia
Year	Constituency	Candidate	Votes	Pct	Opponent(s)	Votes	Pct	Ballots cast	Majority	Turnout
2018	P152 Kluang	Gan Ping Sieu (MCA)	24,618	30.57%	Wong Shu Qi (DAP)	47,671	59.20%	81,841	23,053	84.45%
2018	P152 Kluang	Gan Ping Sieu (MCA)	24,618	30.57%	Muhammad Hasbullah Md Najib (PAS)	8,242	10.23%	81,841	23,053	84.45%
2022	P152 Kluang	Gan Ping Sieu (MCA)	23,395	24.47%	Wong Shu Qi (DAP)	49,801	52.08%	95,621	26,406	72.25%
2022	P152 Kluang	Gan Ping Sieu (MCA)	23,395	24.47%	Dzulkarnain Alias (BERSATU)	22,021	23.03%	95,621	26,406	72.25%
2022	P152 Kluang	Gan Ping Sieu (MCA)	23,395	24.47%	Ramendran Ulaganathan (IND)	404	0.42%	95,621	26,406	72.25%
