= Perling (state constituency) =

State constituency in Malaysia

Perling (N46)
Johor constituency

State constituency
- Legislature: Johor State Legislative Assembly
MLA
Pannir Selvam Paliksina Siwalinggam
BN
- Constituency created: 2018
- First contested: 2018
- Last contested: 2026

Demographics
- Population (2020): 189,758
- Electors (2026): 109,992
- Area (km²): 52

Perling is a state constituency in Johor, Malaysia, that has been represented in the Johor State Legislative Assembly since 2018.

The state constituency was first contested in 2018 and is mandated to return a single Assemblyman to the Johor State Legislative Assembly under the first-past-the-post voting system.

== Demographics ==
As of 2020, Perling has a population of 189,758 people.

Ethnic breakdown of Perling's electorate as of 2026
1. Chinese (46.9%)
2. Malay (37.0%)
3. Indian (13.3%)
4. Other ethnicities (2.70%)

== History ==
=== Polling districts ===
According to the gazette issued on 2 July 2026, the Perling constituency has a total of 26 polling districts.

State constituency	Polling districts	Code	Location
Perling（N46）	Belibis Perling	161/46/01	SK Taman Perling
Perling（N46）	Sri Jaya	161/46/02	SK Kg Pasir
Perling（N46）	Kampong Pasir	161/46/03	SA Dato' Omar Yusof Kampung Pasir
Perling（N46）	Pengkalan Rinting	161/46/04	Dewan Hassan Abdullah
Perling（N46）	Skudai Kiri	161/46/05	SK Pengkalan Rinting
Perling（N46）	Sungai Danga	161/46/06	SK Sungai Danga
Perling（N46）	Taman Sutera	161/46/07	SK Taman Sutera
Perling（N46）	Bukit Serene	161/46/08	SJK (C) Foon Yew 2
Perling（N46）	Tarom	161/46/09	SMK Sultan Ismail
Perling（N46）	Nong Chik	161/46/10	Maktab Sultan Abu Bakar
Perling（N46）	Tambatan	161/46/11	SK Nong Chik
Perling（N46）	Gertak Merah	161/46/12	SA Bandar Johor Bahru
Perling（N46）	Kampong Bahru	161/46/13	SMK Aminuddin Baki
Perling（N46）	Yahya Awal	161/46/14	SMK (P) Sultan Ibrahim
Perling（N46）	Ngee Heng	161/46/15	SK Ngee Heng
Perling（N46）	Ayer Molek	161/46/16	SK Ayer Molek
Perling（N46）	Kampong Pahang	161/46/17	SK St. Joseph
Perling（N46）	Bandar	161/46/18	SK Infant Jesus Convent
Perling（N46）	Camar Perling	161/46/19	SA Taman Perling 2
Perling（N46）	Pekaka Perling	161/46/20	SA Ibnu Khaldun Taman Perling
Perling（N46）	Rawa Perling	161/46/21	SK Taman Peling 3; SMK Dato' Usman Awang
Perling（N46）	Bukit Indah	161/46/22	SMK Taman Bukit Indah; SJK (T) Ladang Bukit Serampang
Perling（N46）	Nusa Indah	161/46/23	SA Al-Itqan Taman Bukit Indah; SK Taman Bukit Indah; SJK (C) Poay Chai
Perling（N46）	Tampoi Indah	161/46/24	SK Taman Tampoi Indah
Perling（N46）	Simbang Perling	161/46/25	SMK Seri Perling
Perling（N46）	Uda Bestari	161/46/26	SMK Bandar Uda Utama

=== Representation history ===
Members of the Legislative Assembly for Perling
Assembly	No	Years	Member	Party
Constituency created from Pengkalan Rinting and Skudai
14th	N46	2018-2022	Cheo Yee How (邹裕豪)	PH (DAP)
15th	N46	2022–2026	Liew Chin Tong (刘镇东)	PH (DAP)
16th	N46	2026-present	Pannir Selvam Paliksina Siwalinggam	BN (MIC)

== Election results ==
Johor state election, 2026
Party	Candidate	Votes	%	∆%
BN	Pannir Selvam Paliksina Siwalinggam	33,468	48.99	▲13.23
PH	Alan Tee Boon Tsong	31,857	46.63	▲3.04
BERSAMA	Boo Wei Han	2,996	4.39	▲4.39
Total valid votes		68,321	100.00	
Total rejected ballots		675		
Unreturned ballots		57		
Turnout		69,053	62.78	▲19.50
Registered electors		109,992		
Majority		1,611	2.36	▼5.47
BN gain from PH		Swing		?

Johor state election, 2022
Party	Candidate	Votes	%	∆%
PH	Liew Chin Tong	18,628	43.59	▲43.59
BN	Tan Hiang Kee	15,281	35.76	▲10.33
PN	Koo Shiaw Lee	8,829	20.66	▲20.66
Total valid votes		42,738	97.52	
Total rejected ballots		695	1.59	
Unreturned ballots		393	0.90	
Turnout		43,826	43.28	▼39.75
Registered electors		101,263		
Majority		3,347	7.83	▼30.76
PH hold		Swing		

Johor state election, 2018
Party	Candidate	Votes	%
PKR	Cheo Yee How	32,592	63.93
BN	Wong You Fong	13,059	25.34
PAS	Muhamad Nazrin Ihsan	5,890	11.43
Total valid votes		51,541	98.70
Total rejected ballots		524	1.00
Unreturned ballots		157	0.30
Turnout		52,222	83.03
Registered electors		62,895	
Majority		19,533	38.59
This new constituency was created.
