= Ong Kow Meng =

Malaysian politician

- 黃高明; N̂g Ko-bêng; Wong4 Gou1 Ming4

Member of the Johor State Legislative Assembly for Senai
- In office 2008–2013
- Preceded by: Chun Yoon Fook
- Succeeded by: Wong Shu Qi

Personal details
- Born: Ong Kow Meng
- Citizenship: Malaysian
- Party: DAP
- Other political affiliations: Pakatan Rakyat
- Occupation: Politician

Ong Kow Meng is a Malaysian politician from DAP. He was the Member of Johor State Legislative Assembly for Senai from 2008 to 2013.

== Election result ==
Johor State Legislative Assembly
| Year | Constituency | Candidate | Votes | Pct. | Opponent(s) | Votes | Pct. | Ballots cast | Majority | Turnout |
|---|---|---|---|---|---|---|---|---|---|---|
| 2004 | N52 Senai | Ong Kow Meng (DAP) | 8,590 | 37.38% | Chun Yoon Fook (MCA) | 13,884 | 60.41% | 22,983 | 5,294 | 75.43% |
| 2008 | N52 Senai | Ong Kow Meng (DAP) | 14,612 | 56.64% | Chun Yoon Fook (MCA) | 10,582 | 41.02% | 25,800 | 4,030 | 78.33% |
