= Senai (state constituency) =

Political subdivision in Malaysia

Senai (N52)
Johor constituency

State constituency
- Legislature: Johor State Legislative Assembly
MLA
Wong Bor Yang
PH
- Constituency created: 2003
- First contested: 2004
- Last contested: 2026

Demographics
- Population (2020): 128,381
- Electors (2026): 66,635
- Area (km²): 125

Senai is a state constituency in Johor, Malaysia, that is represented in the Johor State Legislative Assembly.

The state constituency was first contested in 2004 and is mandated to return a single Assemblyman to the Johor State Legislative Assembly under the first-past-the-post voting system.

== Demographics ==
As of 2020, Senai has a population of 128,381 people.

Ethnic breakdown of Senai's electorate as of 2026
1. Chinese (55.1%)
2. Malay (29.5%)
3. Indian (12.8%)
4. Other ethnicities (2.70%)

== History ==
=== Polling districts ===
According to the gazette issued on 2 July 2026, the Senai constituency has a total of 17 polling districts.

State constituency	Polling District	Code	Location
Senai (N52)	Senai Baru	163/52/01	SJK (C) Senai; Dewan Serbaguna Taman Senai Baru
Senai (N52)	Seelong	163/52/02	SJK (C) Seelong
Senai (N52)	UTM	163/52/03	Perpustakaan Raja Zarith Sofiah UTM Skudai
Senai (N52)	Bandar Kulai Barat	163/52/04	SK Kulai
Senai (N52)	Bandar Kulai Tengah	163/52/05	SJK (C) Kulai 1
Senai (N52)	Bandar Kulai Timor	163/52/06	SK Kulai 1
Senai (N52)	Kulai	163/52/07	SA Indahpura; SMK Indahpura (1); SMK Kulai Besar
Senai (N52)	Ladang Kulai Besar	163/52/08	SJK (T) Ladang Kulai Besar
Senai (N52)	Saleng	163/52/09	SJK (C) Saleng
Senai (N52)	Taman Aman	163/52/10	Dewan Serbaguna Taman Aman
Senai (N52)	Bandar Senai Utara	163/52/11	SK Senai Utama
Senai (N52)	Bandar Senai Tengah	163/52/12	SA Senai Utama
Senai (N52)	Bandar Senai Selatan	163/52/13	SK Senai
Senai (N52)	Taman Muhibbah	163/52/14	SK Taman Muhibbah; SA Taman Muhibbah
Senai (N52)	Lengkongan	163/52/15	SMK Sultan Ibrahim
Senai (N52)	Taman Selatan	163/52/16	SMK Tunku Abdul Rahman Putra
Senai (N52)	Dawani	163/52/17	SMK Senai

=== Representation history ===
Members of the Legislative Assembly for Senai
Assembly	No	Years	Member	Party
Constituency created from Kulai and Bukit Permai
11th	N52	2004–2008	Chun Yoon Fook (陳潤福)	BN (MCA)
12th	N52	2008–2013	Ong Kow Meng (黄高明)	PR (DAP)
13th	N52	2013–2018	Wong Shu Qi (黄书琪)	PR (DAP)
14th	N52	2018–2022	Alan Tee Boon Tsong (郑凯聪)	PH (DAP)
15th	N52	2022–2026	Wong Bor Yang (黄勃扬）	PH (DAP)
16th	N52	2026-present	Wong Bor Yang (黄勃扬）	PH (DAP)

== Election results ==
Johor state election, 2026
Party	Candidate	Votes	%	∆%
PH	Wong Bor Yang	24,007	52.08	▲0.32
BN	Kiki Tai Chee Chee	20,412	44.28	▲11.07
BERSAMA	Tew Chien How	1,676	3.64	▲3.64
Total valid votes		46,095	100.00	
Total rejected ballots		450		
Unreturned ballots		30		
Turnout		46,575	69.90	▲18.76
Registered electors		66,635		
Majority		3,595	7.80	▼10.74
PH hold		Swing		?

Johor state election, 2022
Party	Candidate	Votes	%	∆%
PH	Wong Bor Yang	16,525	51.75	▼23.35
BN	Kenny Shen Poh Kuan	10,604	33.21	▲8.69
PN	Yeo Kwee Kwang	4,802	15.04	▲15.04
Total valid votes		31,931	100.00	
Total rejected ballots		457		
Unreturned ballots		192		
Turnout		32,580	51.13	▼34.47
Registered electors		63,717		
Majority		5,921	18.54	▼31.66
PH hold		Swing		

Johor state election, 2018
Party	Candidate	Votes	%	∆%
PKR	Alan Tee Boon Tsong	28,274	75.10	▲75.10
BN	Kenny Shen Poh Kuan	9,372	24.90	▼9.06
Total valid votes		37,646	98.49	
Total rejected ballots		483	1.26	
Unreturned ballots		96	0.25	
Turnout		38,225	85.60	▼2.90
Registered electors		44,656		
Majority		18,902	50.20	▲18.12
PKR hold		Swing		

Johor state election, 2013
Party	Candidate	Votes	%	∆%
DAP	Wong Shu Qi	23,110	66.04	▲8.04
BN	Tang Nai Soon	11,883	33.96	▼8.04
Total valid votes		34,993	98.57	
Total rejected ballots		458	1.29	
Unreturned ballots		50	0.14	
Turnout		35,501	88.50	▲10.17
Registered electors		40,110		
Majority		11,227	32.08	▼16.08
DAP hold		Swing		
Source(s) "KEPUTUSAN PILIHAN RAYA UMUM DEWAN UNDANGAN NEGERI".

Johor state election, 2008
Party	Candidate	Votes	%	∆%
DAP	Ong Kow Meng	14,612	58.00	▲19.78
BN	Chun Yoon Fook	10,582	42.00	▼19.78
Total valid votes		25,194	97.65	
Total rejected ballots		577	2.24	
Unreturned ballots		29	0.11	
Turnout		25,800	78.33	▲2.90
Registered electors		32,939		
Majority		4,030	16.00	▼7.56
DAP gain from BN		Swing		?
Source(s) "KEPUTUSAN PILIHAN RAYA UMUM DEWAN UNDANGAN NEGERI PERAK BAGI TAHUN 2008".

Johor state election, 2004
Party	Candidate	Votes	%
BN	Chun Yoon Fook	13,884	61.78
DAP	Ong Kow Meng	8,590	38.22
Total valid votes		22,474	97.79
Total rejected ballots		483	2.10
Unreturned ballots		26	0.11
Turnout		22,983	75.43
Registered electors		30,470	
Majority		5,294	23.56
This was a new constituency created.
Source(s) "KEPUTUSAN PILIHAN RAYA UMUM DEWAN UNDANGAN NEGERI PERAK BAGI TAHUN 2004".
