= Renggam =

Coordinates: 1°53′N 103°24′E

- Mukim
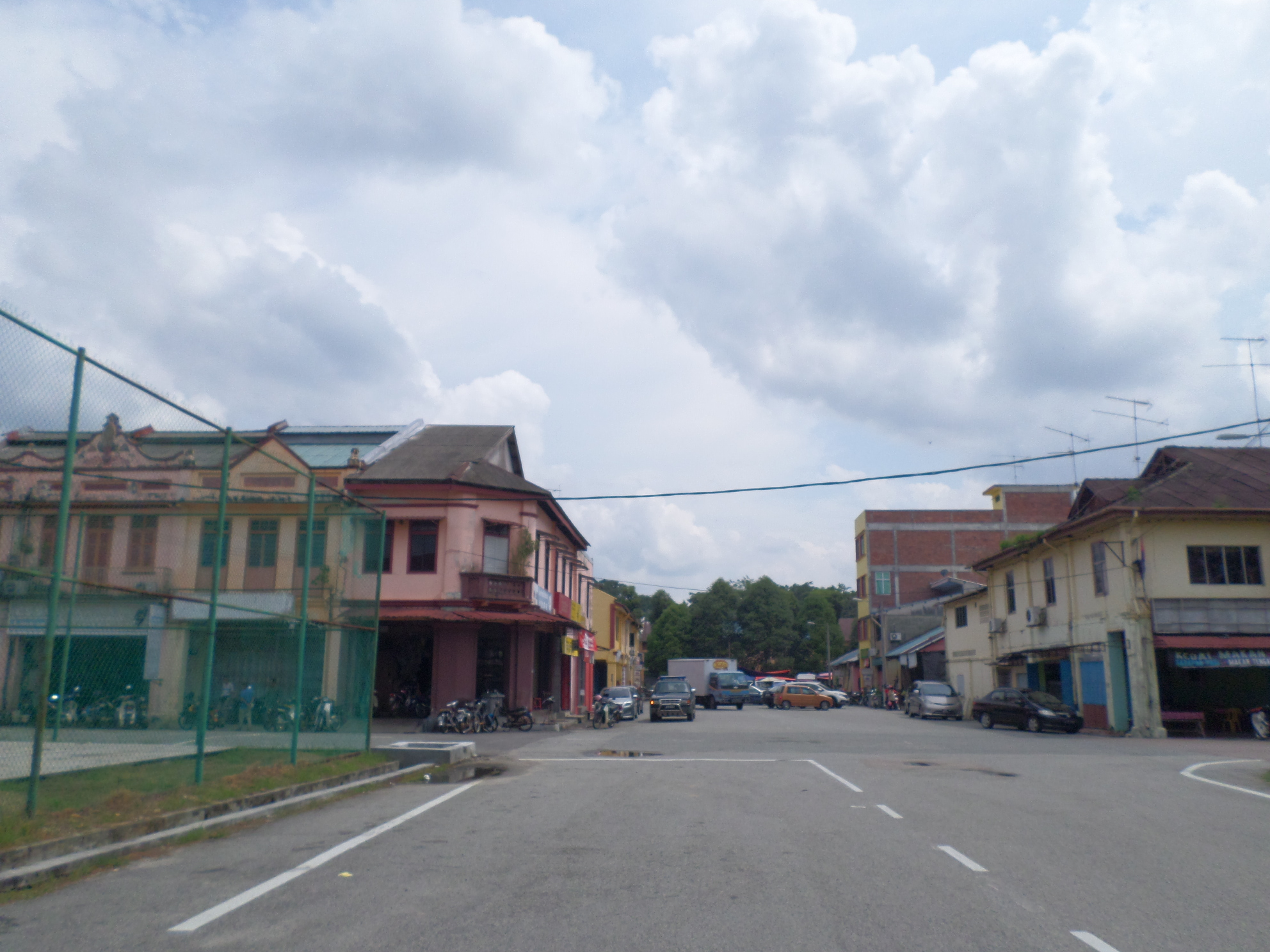
- Interactive map of Renggam
- Country: Malaysia
- State: Johor
- District: Kluang

Area
  - Total: 557 km^{2} (215 sq mi)

Population
  - Total: 47,510
  - Density: 85.3/km^{2} (221/sq mi)

Renggam (also spelled Rengam) is a town and mukim in Kluang District, Johor, Malaysia.

== Geography ==
Rengam in Kluang District

The mukim spans over an area of 557 km^{2}.

== Demographics ==
The mukim has a total population of 47,510 people.

== Transportation ==
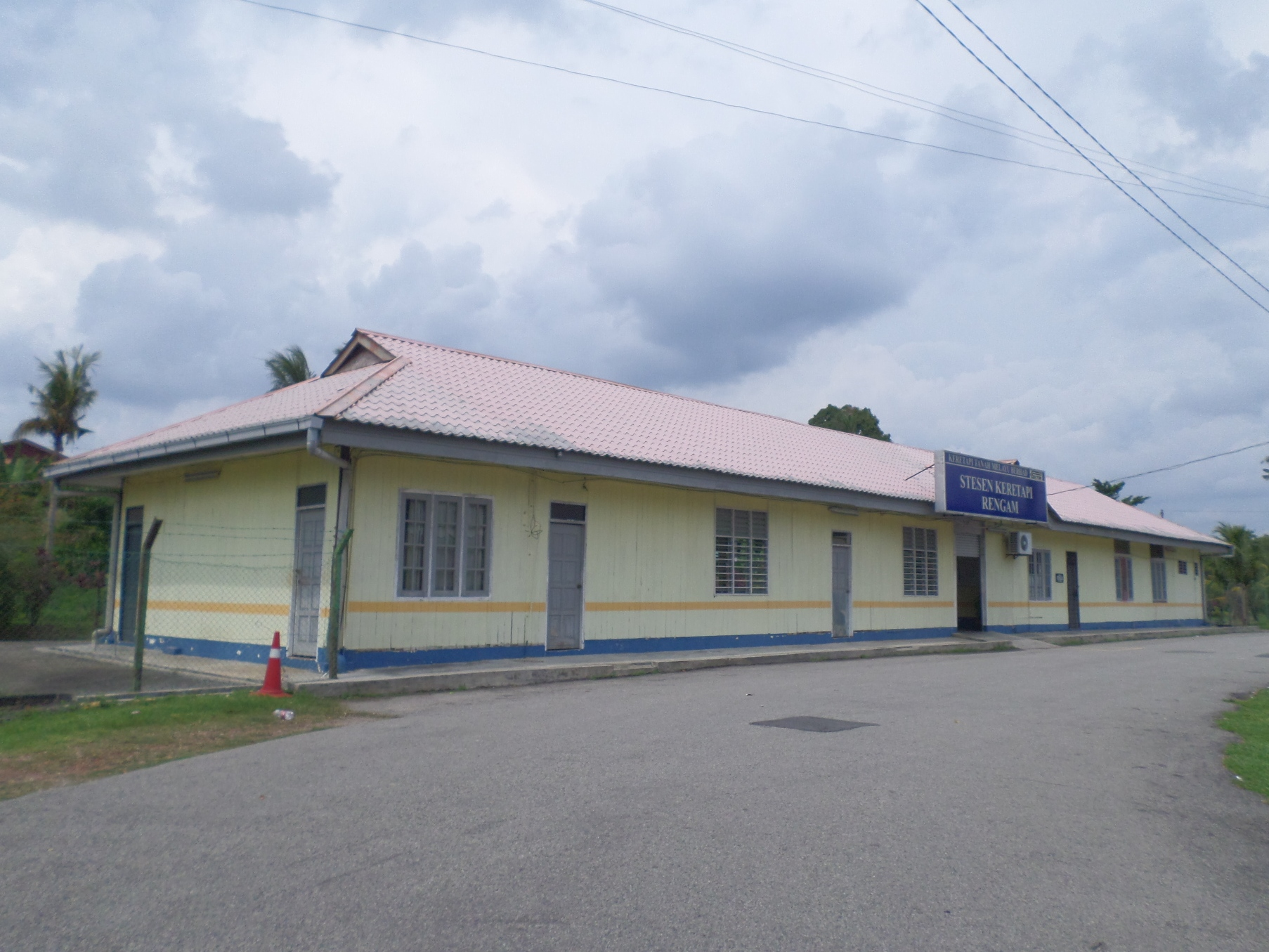
Rengam railway station

The town is served by Rengam railway station.

== See also ==
- Simpang Renggam, approximately 12 km southwest
