= Tan Hong Pin =

Malaysian politician

Yang Berhormat Tuan Tan Hong Pin MP
- 陈泓宾

Member of the Johor State Executive Council
- In office 16 May 2018 – 21 April 2019
- Monarch: Ibrahim Iskandar
- Menteri Besar: Osman Sapian
- Preceded by: Md Jais Sarday
- Succeeded by: Tan Chen Choon (Local Government); Aminolhuda Hassan (Science and Technology)
- Constituency: Skudai

Assistant National Organising Secretary of the Democratic Action Party
- Incumbent
- Assumed office 16 March 2025 Serving with Lee Chin Chen
- Secretary-General: Anthony Loke Siew Fook
- National Organising Secretary: Khoo Poay Tiong
- Preceded by: Ng Suee Lim

Member of the Malaysian Parliament for Bakri
- Incumbent
- Assumed office 19 November 2022
- Preceded by: Yeo Bee Yin (PH–DAP)
- Majority: 19,254 (2022)

Member of the Johor State Legislative Assembly for Skudai
- In office 9 May 2018 – 12 March 2022
- Preceded by: Boo Cheng Hau (PR–DAP)
- Succeeded by: Marina Ibrahim (PH–DAP)
- Majority: 35,126 (2018)

Member of the Johor State Legislative Assembly for Mengkibol
- In office 5 May 2013 – 9 May 2018
- Preceded by: Ng Lam Hua (PR–DAP)
- Succeeded by: Chew Chong Sin (PH–DAP)
- Majority: 10,001 (2013)

Personal details
- Born: Tan Hong Pin; 20 March 1981 (age 45) Johor, Malaysia
- Citizenship: Malaysian
- Party: Democratic Action Party (DAP)
- Other political affiliations: Pakatan Rakyat (PR) (2008–2015); Pakatan Harapan (PH) (since 2015)
- Occupation: Politician
- Tan Hong Pin on Facebook

Tan Hong Pin

Chinese name
- Traditional Chinese: 陳泓賓
- Simplified Chinese: 陈泓宾
- Hanyu Pinyin: Chén Hóngbīn
- Jyutping: Can4 Wang4 Ban1
- Hokkien POJ: Tân Hông-pin
- Tâi-lô: Tân Hông-pin

Tan Hong Pin (simplified Chinese: 陈泓宾; traditional Chinese: 陳泓賓; pinyin: Chén Hóngbīn; Jyutping: Can4 Wang4 Ban1; Pe̍h-ōe-jī: Tân Hông-pin; Tâi-lô: Tân Hông-pin; born 20 March 1981) is a Malaysian politician who has served as the Member of Parliament (MP) for Bakri since November 2022. He served as Member of the Johor State Executive Council (EXCO) in the Pakatan Harapan (PH) state administration under former Menteri Besar Osman Sapian from May 2018 to April 2019 and Member of the Johor State Legislative Assembly (MLA) for Skudai from May 2018 to March 2022 and for Mengkibol from May 2013 to May 2018. He is a member of the Democratic Action Party (DAP), a component party of the Pakatan Harapan (PH) coalition. He has served as the Assistant National Organising Secretary of DAP since March 2025.

== Election results ==
Johor State Legislative Assembly
Year	Constituency	Candidate	Votes	Pct	Opponent(s)	Votes	Pct	Ballots cast	Majority	Turnout
2013	N28 Mengkibol	Tan Hong Pin (DAP)	23,036	63.71%	Chye Kwee Yeow (MCA)	13,035	36.05%	36,683	10,001	86.70%
2013	N28 Mengkibol	Tan Hong Pin (DAP)	23,036	63.71%	Ng Lam Hua (IND)	85	0.24%	36,683	10,001	86.70%
2018	N48 Skudai	Tan Hong Pin (DAP)	47,359	83.29%	S Kanan G Suppiah (MIC)	12,233	16.71%	60,440	35,126	85.20%

Parliament of Malaysia
Year	Constituency	Candidate	Votes	Pct	Opponent(s)	Votes	Pct	Ballots cast	Majority	Turnout
2022	P145 Bakri	Tan Hong Pin (DAP)	36,636	50.09%	Chris Lee Ching Yong (MCA)	17,382	23.77%	73,140	19,254	75.14%
2022	P145 Bakri	Tan Hong Pin (DAP)	36,636	50.09%	Chelvarajan Suppiah (BERSATU)	17,222	23.55%	73,140	19,254	75.14%
2022	P145 Bakri	Tan Hong Pin (DAP)	36,636	50.09%	Haron Jaffar (IND)	1,900	2.60%	73,140	19,254	75.14%

== Honours ==
=== Honours of Malaysia ===
- Malaysia
  - Recipient of the 17th Yang di-Pertuan Agong Installation Medal (2024)
