= Kluang (federal constituency) =

Federal constituency in Johor, Malaysia

Kluang (P152)
Johor constituency

Federal constituency
- Legislature: Dewan Rakyat
- MP: Wong Shu Qi; PH
- Constituency created: 1974
- First contested: 1974
- Last contested: 2022

Demographics
- Population (2020): 183,855
- Electors (2026): 136,019
- Area (km²): 256
- Pop. density (per km²): 718.2

Kluang is a federal constituency in Kluang District, Johor, Malaysia, that has been represented in the Dewan Rakyat since 1974.

The federal constituency was created in the 1974 redistribution and is mandated to return a single member to the Dewan Rakyat under the first past the post voting system.

== Demographics ==
Ethnic breakdown of Kluang's electorate as of 2022
1. Chinese (46.3%)
2. Malay (42.7%)
3. Indian (10.1%)
4. Other ethnicities (0.90%)

As of 2020, Kluang has a population of 183,855 people.

Age breakdown of Kluang's electorate as of 2022
1. 18-20 (5.63%)
2. 21-29 (21.2%)
3. 30-39 (22.2%)
4. 40-49 (16.7%)
5. 50-59 (14.1%)
6. 60-69 (11.7%)
7. 70-79 (6.04%)
8. 80-89 (1.99%)
9. above 90 (0.39%)
Gender breakdown of Kluang's electorate as of 2022
1. Male (50.2%)
2. Female (49.8%)

== History ==
=== Polling districts ===
According to the gazette issued on 2 July 2026, the Kluang constituency has a total of 40 polling districts.

State constituency	Polling districts	Code	Location
Mengkibol (N28)	Ladang Bukit Benut	152/28/01	SA Ladang Bukit Benut
Mengkibol (N28)	Ladang Coronation	152/28/02	SA Taman Desa
Mengkibol (N28)	Pekan Sri Lalang Barat	152/28/03	Dewan Raya Sri Lalang
Mengkibol (N28)	Pekan Sri Lalang Timor	152/28/04	SJK (T) Ladang Niyor
Mengkibol (N28)	Ladang Mengkibol	152/28/05	SA Seri Taman Kluang Barat; SK Seri Taman Kluang Barat
Mengkibol (N28)	Mengkibol Barat	152/28/06	SK Seri Intan
Mengkibol (N28)	Mengkibol Timor	152/28/07	Kolej Vokesional Kluang; SA Taman Delima
Mengkibol (N28)	Taman Kurnia	152/28/08	SMA Arabiah Kluang
Mengkibol (N28)	Bakar Sampah	152/28/09	SJK (C) Chong Hwa 2
Mengkibol (N28)	Lambak	152/28/10	SJK (C) Chong Hwa 1
Mengkibol (N28)	Yap Tau Sah	152/28/11	SJK (C) Pin Ming
Mengkibol (N28)	Yap Tau Sah Timor	152/28/12	SMJK Chong Hwa
Mengkibol (N28)	Jalan Mersing	152/28/13	SK Abdul Rahman Yassin
Mengkibol (N28)	Jalan Johor Tenggara	152/28/14	SA Dato' Ahmad; SMK Jalan Kota Tinggi
Mengkibol (N28)	Kluang Layang	152/28/15	SMK Jalan Mengkibol
Mengkibol (N28)	Ladang Lambak	152/28/16	SJK (T) Ladang Lambak
Mengkibol (N28)	Ladang Elaeis	152/28/17	SJK (T) Ladang Lambak
Mengkibol (N28)	Kampung Gunung Lambak	152/28/18	SJK (C) Chong Hwa 3
Mengkibol (N28)	Taman Megah	152/28/19	Dewan Muafakat Kg. Dato Abdul Rahman Yassin
Mengkibol (N28)	Kampong Paya Timor	152/28/20	SJK (C) Pa Yai
Mengkibol (N28)	Kampong Paya Barat	152/28/21	SJK (C) Pa Yai
Mengkibol (N28)	Kampong Melayu Timor	152/28/22	Dewan Seberguna Kg. Paya
Mahkota (N29)	Padang Tembak	152/29/01	SMK Sultan Abdul Jalil
Mahkota (N29)	Kampong Melayu Timor II	152/29/02	SA Sri Kg. Tengah 1; SA Sri Kg. Tengah 2
Mahkota (N29)	Kampung Tengah	152/29/03	SK Seri Kg Tengah
Mahkota (N29)	Kampong Melayu I	152/29/04	SK Kampong Melayu
Mahkota (N29)	Kampong Melayu II	152/29/05	Dewan Raya Majlis Perbandaran Kluang
Mahkota (N29)	Taman Lian Seng	152/29/06	SJK (T) Jalan Haji Manan
Mahkota (N29)	Haji Manan	152/29/07	SJK (C) Chong Eng
Mahkota (N29)	Mesjid Lama	152/29/08	SA Gunung Lambak
Mahkota (N29)	Bandar Tengah	152/29/09	SJK (C) Chong Eng
Mahkota (N29)	Taman Ilham	152/29/10	SA Kluang Barat
Mahkota (N29)	Dorset	152/29/11	SMK Taman Seri Kluang; Dewan Mahkota, Kem Mahkota; Dewan Pusat Banjir Kampong Bentong Kluang; Balai Raya Kampung Bentong
Mahkota (N29)	Taman Berlian	152/29/12	Dewan Serbaguna Taman Sri Kluang
Mahkota (N29)	Jalan Hospital	152/29/13	SK (L) Bandar Kluang
Mahkota (N29)	Taman Kerjasama	153/29/14	SMK Tun Hussein Onn
Mahkota (N29)	Kampung Baru	153/29/15	SMK Sultan Abdul Jalil
Mahkota (N29)	Taman Suria	152/29/16	SMK Seri Perdana
Mahkota (N29)	Indah Jaya	152/29/17	SK Dato' Syed Zain Alshahab
Mahkota (N29)	Sri Tengah	152/29/18	SMK Tengku Aris Bendahara

=== Representation history ===
Members of Parliament for Kluang
Parliament	No	Years	Member	Party	Vote Share
Constituency created from Kluang Utara, Segamat Selatan, Renggam and Ayer Hitam
Keluang
4th	P101	1974–1978	Loh Fook Yen (罗福元)	BN (MCA)	13,247; 54.14%
5th	P101	1978–1982	Lee Kaw (李高)	DAP	16,887; 51.51%
6th	P101	1982–1986	Quah Wee Liam (柯威廉)	BN (MCA)	23,760; 58.14%
Kluang
7th	P120	1986–1990	Ling Chooi Sieng (林水仙)	BN (MCA)	22,891; 50.96%
8th	P120	1990–1995	Kang Chow Oh (江沼湖)	BN (MCA)	29,700; 54.46%
9th	P130	1995–1999	Hoo Seong Chang (何襄赞)	BN (MCA)	30,097; 73.21%
10th	P130	1999–2004	Hoo Seong Chang (何襄赞)	BN (MCA)	30,540; 71.51%
11th	P152	2004–2008	Hoo Seong Chang (何襄赞)	BN (MCA)	33,001; 69.76%
12th	P152	2008–2013	Hou Kok Chung (何国忠)	BN (MCA)	27,970; 53.62%
13th	P152	2013–2015	Liew Chin Tong (刘镇东)	PR (DAP)	40,574; 54.99%
13th	P152	2015–2018	Liew Chin Tong (刘镇东)	PH (DAP)	40,574; 54.99%
14th	P152	2018–2022	Wong Shu Qi (黄书琪)	PH (DAP)	47,671; 59.20%
15th	P152	2022–present	Wong Shu Qi (黄书琪)	PH (DAP)	49,801; 52.08%

=== State constituency ===
Parliamentary constituency	State constituency						
Parliamentary constituency	1954–59*	1959–1974	1974–1986	1986–1995	1995–2004	2004–2018	2018–present
Kluang			Bandar Keluang				
Kluang			Bekok				
Kluang				Gunung Lambak			
Kluang						Mahkota	
Kluang					Mengkibol		
Kluang				Paloh			

=== Historical boundaries ===
State Constituency	Area				
State Constituency	1974	1984	1994	2003	2018
Bandar Keluang	Kampung Dato Abdul Rahman Yassin; Kampung Gajah; Kampung Melayu; Kampung Yap Tau Sah; Kluang				
Bekok	Bekok; Chaah; Desa Temu Jodoh; Kampung Punca Jaya; Paloh				
Gunung Lambak		Bandar Seri Impian; FELDA Ulu Dengar; Kampung Dato Abdul Rahman Yassin; Kampung Melayu; Kampung Yap Tau Sah			
Mahkota				Kampung Melayu; Kluang; Taman Idaman; Taman Makmur; Taman Suria Jaya	Kampung Melayu; Kluang; Padang Tembak; Taman Makmur; Taman Suria Jaya
Mengkibol			Kampung Melayu; Kampung Yap Tau Sah; Kluang; Mengkibol; Taman Makmur; Taman Seri Setia	Bandar Seri Impian; Kampung Dato Abdul Rahman Yassin; Kampung Yap Tau Sah; Padang Tembak; Seri Lalang	Bandar Seri Impian; Kampung Dato Abdul Rahman Yassin; Kampung Yap Tau Sah; Seri Lalang; Taman Intan
Paloh		Chamek; Nyior; Paloh; Sri Lalang; Taman Intan	Chamek; Nyior; Paloh; Sri Lalang; Taman Suria Jaya		

=== Current state assembly members ===
No.	State Constituency	Member	Coalition (Party)
N28	Mengkibol	Chu Poh Yee	PH (DAP)
N29	Mahkota	Syed Hussien Syed Abdullah	BN (UMNO)

=== Local governments & postcodes ===
No.	State Constituency	Local Government	Postcode
N28	Mengkibol	Kluang Municipal Council; Simpang Renggam District Council (Ladang Bukit Benut area)	86000 Kluang; 86300 Renggam
N29	Mahkota	Kluang Municipal Council	86000 Kluang; 86300 Renggam

== Election results ==
Malaysian general election, 2022
Party	Candidate	Votes	%	∆%
PH	Wong Shu Qi	49,801	52.08	▲52.08
BN	Gan Ping Sieu	23,395	24.47	▼6.10
PN	Dzulkarnain Alias	22,021	23.03	▲23.03
Independent	Ramendran Ulaganathan	404	0.42	▲0.42
Total valid votes		95,621	100.00	
Total rejected ballots		1,204		
Unreturned ballots		337		
Turnout		97,162	73.42	▼11.03
Registered electors		132,342		
Majority		26,406	27.61	▼1.02
PH hold		Swing		
Source(s) https://lom.agc.gov.my/ilims/upload/portal/akta/outputp/1753254/PUB%20617%20PARLIMEN%20JOHOR.pdf

Malaysian general election, 2018
Party	Candidate	Votes	%	∆%
PKR	Wong Shu Qi	47,671	59.20	▲59.20
BN	Gan Ping Sieu	24,618	30.57	▼14.44
PAS	Muhammad Hasbullah Md Najib	8,242	10.23	▲10.23
Total valid votes		80,531	100.00	
Total rejected ballots		921		
Unreturned ballots		389		
Turnout		81,841	84.45	▼2.33
Registered electors		96,915		
Majority		23,053	28.63	▲18.65
PKR hold		Swing		
Source(s) "His Majesty's Government Gazette - Notice of Contested Election, Parliament for the State of Johore [P.U. (B) 244/2018]" (PDF). Attorney General's Chambers of Malaysia. 3 May 2018. Archived from the original (PDF) on 2019-12-29. "Federal Government Gazette - Results of Contested Election and Statements of the Poll after the Official Addition of Votes, Parliamentary Constituencies for the State of Johore [P.U. (B) 318/2018]" (PDF). Attorney General's Chambers of Malaysia. 28 May 2018.

Malaysian general election, 2013
Party	Candidate	Votes	%	∆%
DAP	Liew Chin Tong	40,574	54.99	▲8.61
BN	Hou Kok Chung	33,215	45.01	▼8.61
Total valid votes		73,789	100.00	
Total rejected ballots		1,292		
Unreturned ballots		181		
Turnout		75,262	86.78	▲10.18
Registered electors		86,732		
Majority		7,359	9.98	▲2.74
DAP gain from BN		Swing		?
Source(s) "Federal Government Gazette - Notice of Contested Election, Parliament for the State of Johore [P.U. (B) 181/2013]" (PDF). Attorney General's Chambers of Malaysia. 26 April 2013. "Federal Government Gazette - Results of Contested Election and Statements of the Poll after the Official Addition of Votes, Parliamentary Constituencies for the State of Johore [P.U. (B) 222/2013]" (PDF). Attorney General's Chambers of Malaysia. 22 May 2013.

Malaysian general election, 2008
Party	Candidate	Votes	%	∆%
BN	Hou Kok Chung	27,970	53.62	▼16.14
DAP	Ng Lam Hua	24,189	46.38	▲16.14
Total valid votes		52,159	100.00	
Total rejected ballots		1,884		
Unreturned ballots		524		
Turnout		54,567	76.60	▲3.00
Registered electors		71,233		
Majority		3,781	7.24	▼32.28
BN hold		Swing		

Malaysian general election, 2004
Party	Candidate	Votes	%	∆%
BN	Hoo Seong Chang	33,001	69.76	▼1.75
DAP	Ng Lam Hua	14,303	30.24	▲1.75
Total valid votes		47,304	100.00	
Total rejected ballots		1,477		
Unreturned ballots		881		
Turnout		49,662	73.60	▲0.66
Registered electors		67,475		
Majority		18,698	39.52	▼3.50
BN hold		Swing		

Malaysian general election, 1999
Party	Candidate	Votes	%	∆%
BN	Hoo Seong Chang	30,540	71.51	▼1.70
DAP	Chew Peck Choo	12,170	28.49	▲1.70
Total valid votes		42,710	100.00	
Total rejected ballots		1,033		
Unreturned ballots		2,898		
Turnout		46,641	72.94	▲0.83
Registered electors			63,944	
Majority		18,370	43.02	▼3.40
BN hold		Swing		

Malaysian general election, 1995
Party	Candidate	Votes	%	∆%
BN	Hoo Seong Chang	30,097	73.21	▲18.75
DAP	Lim Ser Ho	11,014	26.79	▼18.75
Total valid votes		41,111	100.00	
Total rejected ballots		1,551		
Unreturned ballots		817		
Turnout		43,479	72.11	▼3.29
Registered electors		60,292		
Majority		19,083	46.42	▲37.50
BN hold		Swing		

Malaysian general election, 1990
Party	Candidate	Votes	%	∆%
BN	Kang Chow Oh	29,700	54.46	▲3.50
DAP	Ng Wei Siong	24,832	45.54	▼0.94
Total valid votes		54,532	100.00	
Total rejected ballots		1,384		
Unreturned ballots		0		
Turnout		55,916	75.40	▲0.48
Registered electors		74,164		
Majority		4,868	8.92	▲4.44
BN hold		Swing		

Malaysian general election, 1986
Party	Candidate	Votes	%	∆%
BN	Ling Towi Seng @ Ling Chooi Sieng	22,891	50.96	▼7.18
DAP	Lee Kaw	20,882	46.48	▲4.62
PAS	Abu Hassan Umat @ Ahmad	1,149	2.56	▲2.56
Total valid votes		44,922	100.00	
Total rejected ballots		1,600		
Unreturned ballots		0		
Turnout		46,522	74.92	▼2.01
Registered electors		62,099		
Majority		2,009	4.48	▼11.80
BN hold		Swing		

Malaysian general election, 1982
Party	Candidate	Votes	%	∆%
BN	Quah Wee Liam	23,760	58.14	▲11.73
DAP	Lee Kaw	17,107	41.86	▼9.65
Total valid votes		40,867	100.00	
Total rejected ballots		1,227		
Unreturned ballots		0		
Turnout		42,094	76.93	▲0.33
Registered electors		54,717		
Majority		6,653	16.28	▲11.18
BN gain from DAP		Swing		?

Malaysian general election, 1978
Party	Candidate	Votes	%	∆%
DAP	Lee Kaw	16,887	51.51	▲5.65
BN	Loh Fook Yen	15,215	46.41	▼7.73
PAS	Abu Bakar Kathom	679	2.07	▲2.07
Total valid votes		32,781	100.00	
Total rejected ballots		1,088		
Unreturned ballots		0		
Turnout		33,869	76.40	▲3.70
Registered electors		44,331		
Majority		1,672	5.10	▼3.18
DAP gain from BN		Swing		?

Malaysian general election, 1974
Party	Candidate	Votes	%
BN	Loh Fook Yen	13,247	54.14
DAP	Lee Kaw	11,223	45.86
Total valid votes		24,470	100.00
Total rejected ballots		805	
Unreturned ballots		0	
Turnout		25,275	72.70
Registered electors		31,687	
Majority		2,024	8.28
This was a new constituency created.
