= Wong Bor Yang =

Malaysian politician

Yang Berhormat Wong Bor Yang MLA
- 黃勃揚

Member of the Johor State Legislative Assembly for Senai
- Incumbent
- Assumed office 2022
- Preceded by: Alan Tee Boon Tsong

Personal details
- Born: Wong Bor Yang
- Citizenship: Malaysian
- Party: Democratic Action Party (DAP)
- Occupation: Politician

Wong Bor Yang is a Malaysian politician from the Democratic Action Party (DAP). He has served as the Member of the Johor State Legislative Assembly for Senai since 2022.

== Politics ==
Wong was elected publicity secretary of DAP Johor in October 2024.

In June 2026, DAP announced that Wong would defend the Senai seat in the 2026 Johor state election.

== Election results ==
Johor State Legislative Assembly
Year	Constituency	Candidate	Votes	Pct.	Opponent(s)	Votes	Pct.	Ballots cast	Majority	Turnout
2022	N52 Senai	Wong Bor Yang (PH)	16,525	51.75%	Kenny Shen Poh Kuan (BN)	10,604	33.21%	32,580	5,921	51.13%
2022	N52 Senai	Wong Bor Yang (PH)	16,525	51.75%	Yeo Kwee Kwang (PN)	4,802	15.04%	32,580	5,921	51.13%
