= Hou Kok Chung =

Malaysian politician (born 1963)

Yang Berbahagia Dato' Sri Hou Kok Chung SSAP DIMP
- 何国忠

Deputy Minister of Higher Education I
- In office 19 March 2008 – 15 May 2013 Serving with Idris Haron (2008–2009); Saifuddin Abdullah (2009–2013)
- Monarchs: Mizan Zainal Abidin; Abdul Halim
- Prime Minister: Abdullah Ahmad Badawi; Najib Razak
- Minister: Mohamed Khaled Nordin
- Preceded by: Ong Tee Keat
- Succeeded by: P. Kamalanathan
- Constituency: Kluang

Vice-President of Malaysian Chinese Association
- In office 21 December 2013 – 5 November 2018 Serving with Lee Chee Leong; Chua Tee Yong; Chew Mei Fun
- President: Liow Tiong Lai
- Deputy: Wee Ka Siong
- Preceded by: Donald Lim Siang Chai
- Succeeded by: Tan Teik Cheng
- Constituency: Kluang

Member of the Malaysian Parliament for Kluang
- In office 8 March 2008 – 5 May 2013
- Preceded by: Hoo Seong Chang (MCA–BN)
- Succeeded by: Liew Chin Tong (DAP)
- Majority: 3,781 (2008)

Personal details
- Born: Hou Kok Chung; 22 February 1963 (age 63) Kluang, Johor, Federation of Malaya (now Malaysia)
- Citizenship: Malaysian
- Party: Malaysian Chinese Association (MCA)
- Other political affiliations: Barisan Nasional (BN); Perikatan Nasional (PN)
- Education: University of Malaya; SOAS University of London
- Occupation: Politician

Chinese name
- Traditional Chinese: 何國忠
- Simplified Chinese: 何国忠
- Hanyu Pinyin: Hé Guózhōng
- Hokkien POJ: Hô Kok-tiong

Hou Kok Chung (Chinese: 何国忠; Pe̍h-ōe-jī: Hô Kok-tiong; born 22 February 1963) is a Malaysian politician from the Malaysian Chinese Association (MCA) party from the Barisan National (BN) coalition.

== Personal life and education ==
Hailing from the state of Johor, his birthplace is Kluang, he received his early education at Kahang Chinese Primary School, Tengku Aris Bendahara Kluang National Secondary School, Sultan Abdul Jalil Kluang National Secondary School, Chong Hwa Chinese Secondary School and Kluang High School.

Kok Chung is married to Lim Mooi Lang, and together has a son and two daughters.

Kok Chung is an alumnus of University of Malaya (UM), and a Doctor of Philosophy (PhD) from the SOAS, University of London. He started as a lecturer in UM, moving up in his academic career as an associate professor, as Head of the East Asia Studies and most recently helm the Institute for China Studies in the same university as its director, when he opted for early retirement to contest in the 12th Malaysian general election.

He had written, as well as co-authored numerous books, mostly related to the political, economic, education dan cultural endeavours of the Chinese community in Malaysia, and its connections to East Asian countries namely China, Japan dan Taiwan.

Kok Chung’s academic passion saw him appointed into Universiti Tunku Abdul Rahman (UTAR) Council as the deputy chairman; council member of Tunku Abdul Rahman University College (TAR UC); Guest Professor to Xiamen University; and an adjunct professor of UTAR.

== Political career ==
Formerly one of the four vice-presidents of MCA (2013-2018), he secured the second highest number of votes during the party election held on 21 December 2013. Kok Chung is a 2nd term Senator in the Senate of Malaysia appointed in 2014 and ends in 2020.

In the 12th Malaysian general election, Kok Chung contested in the parliamentary constituency of Kluang (P.152) in the state of Johor as the Barisan Nasional (BN) candidate, which he won. Winning in the 12th GE, Kok Chung’s earned a place as the deputy minister for Higher Education in the then newly-formed Malaysian Cabinet.

In the 13th Malaysian general election in 2013, Kok Chung re-contested the constituency of Kluang, but was defeated by a Democratic Action Party (DAP) opponent, Liew Chin Tong. In the 14th Malaysian general election, Kok Chung contested the Tebrau constituency (P.158) in Johor, but ultimately lost to Pakatan Harapan's Choong Shiau Yoon.

== Election results ==
Parliament of Malaysia
Year	Constituency	Candidate	Votes	Pct	Opponent(s)	Votes	Pct	Ballots cast	Majority	Turnout
2008	P152 Kluang	Hou Kok Chung (MCA)	27,970	53.62%	Ng Lam Hua (DAP)	24,189	46.38%	52,159	3,781	76.60%
2013	P152 Kluang	Hou Kok Chung (MCA)	33,215	45.01%	Liew Chin Tong (DAP)	40,574	54.99%	75,308	7,359	86.80%
2018	P158 Tebrau	Hou Kok Chung (MCA)	27,310	26.27%	Choong Shiau Yoon (PKR)	64,535	62.09%	105,420	37,225	85.68%
2018	P158 Tebrau	Hou Kok Chung (MCA)	27,310	26.27%	Abdullah Husin (PAS)	12,098	11.64%	105,420	37,225	85.68%

== Honours ==
- Pahang
  - Grand Knight of the Order of Sultan Ahmad Shah of Pahang (SSAP) – Dato' Sri (2017)
  - Knight Companion of the Order of the Crown of Pahang (DIMP) – Dato' (2010)
