= Boo Cheng Hau =

Malaysian politician and medical doctor

Dr. Boo Cheng Hau
- 巫程豪

Member of the Johor State Legislative Assembly for Skudai
- In office 8 March 2008 – 9 May 2018
- Preceded by: Teo Eng Tee (BN–Gerakan)
- Succeeded by: Tan Hong Pin (PH–DAP)
- Majority: 12,854 (2008); 18,050 (2013)

Personal details
- Born: 1 October 1964 (age 61) Johor Bahru, Malaysia
- Citizenship: Malaysian
- Party: Democratic Action Party (1994–)
- Other political affiliations: Pakatan Harapan (PH) (2015–); Pakatan Rakyat (PR) (2008-2015); Barisan Alternatif (BA) (1999-2004); Gagasan Rakyat (GR) (1994-1996)
- Occupation: Politician
- Profession: Doctor
- Website: drboochenghau.blogspot.com
- Boo Cheng Hau on Facebook

Boo Cheng Hau (Chinese: 巫程豪; pinyin: Wū Chéngháo; Pe̍h-ōe-jī: Bû Thêng-hô; born 1 October 1964) is a Malaysian politician of Democratic Action Party (DAP). He has served as Member of the Johor State Legislative Assembly (MLA) of Skudai for two terms from March 2008 to May 2018.

== Background and personal life ==
Boo is a family physician who holds three bachelor degrees in chemistry from Iowa State University of Ames; medicine and surgery from University of the West Indies of Jamaica, and law from University of London respectively.

He is a practicing medical doctor by profession. On 25 October 2011, his clinic in Taman Universiti, Skudai, Johor Bahru, was broken into resulting with a loss of RM800. The Royal Malaysia Police (RMP)'s Deputy Johor CID chief, ACP Che Yusoff Che Ngah said the incident involved a clinic worker noticed about 8 am before the police received a report about an hour later. Boo when interviewed, said the incident involved the first time since the clinic opened 13 years ago.

In December 2020, Boo was tested positive for the COVID-19 and had recovered from the decease infection since.

== Politics ==
He previously and first contested the Skudai state seat in Johor on the DAP party ticket in the 1999 general election and the 2004 general election but had lost both the contests to the Barisan Nasional (BN). In the 2008 general election, he contested the Skudai state seat again and won to be an assemblyman for Skudai constituency. He retained the seat in the following 2013 general election (GE13). He has been the opposition leader for representing Pakatan Rakyat (PR) in Johor State Legislative Assembly from 2008 till 2015.

Boo was not nominated by DAP as a candidate to contest in the 2018 general election (GE14).

== Controversies and issues ==
In February 2013, an open verbal conflict erupted between Boo as Johor DAP chairman and Johor People's Justice Party (PKR) chairman Chua Jui Meng, prompting calls from both DAP and PKR party heavyweights to weigh in for their party stalwarts. This as a result of accusations from either side of splitting Pakatan Rakyat in the state of Johor. The conflict was resolved after talks and mediation by the central leadership of both parties for reconciliation was DAP to unconditionally support for PKR's Chua to contest in the Segamat constituency in GE13. The traditionally DAP seat was switched for Gelang Patah seat which was where the Skudai state seat located; in order to be contested and later won by its adviser and veteran Lim Kit Siang to be its new Member of Parliament (MP) instead.

In 2018, Boo on the contrary turned down the party's plan to field him in the Labis parliamentary seat which is in Segamat district, Johor and subsequently he was also dropped as candidate to contest his existing Skudai state seat or any other seat in the GE14. Meanwhile DAP replacement candidate for the Labis seat, another former Johor DAP chairman Pang Hok Liong had instead successfully win the traditional Malaysian Chinese Association (MCA)-BN stronghold for the first time to be a newly elected MP. Amidst being disappointed, Boo apparently remains loyal to DAP despite his continuous criticism of the party's leadership and Kit Siang, the new MP for Iskandar Puteri (formerly Gelang Patah).

In 2021, Boo had made critical and controversially remarks in a Johor DAP private WhatsApp group towards his party MP, Hannah Yeoh for Segambut actions for donning the headscarf or 'selendang' and her Malay attire when she was visiting a mosque in her constituency. In response, DAP secretary-general, Lim Guan Eng said Yeoh's attire was not wrong to respect other religions and their worship places in reprimanding and slamming Boo remarks which are not only gender-insensitive but also runs the risk of portraying DAP leaders as being just as intolerant and regressive as the "extremist" and "primitive" Pan-Malaysian Islamic Party (PAS) leaders. Boo remains to be adamant and polemical accused it as an "superficial political gimmicks" attempt to "appease a certain race", while he opined that DAP should be sincere and equal towards every race.

== Election results ==
Johor State Legislative Assembly
Year	Constituency	Candidate	Votes	Pct	Opponent(s)	Votes	Pct	Ballots cast	Majority	Turnout
1999	N38 Skudai	Boo Cheng Hau (DAP)	11,875	33.25%	Khoo Kong Ek (Gerakan)	23,042	64.51%	35,719	11,167	75.63%
2004	N48 Skudai	Boo Cheng Hau (DAP)	13,380	45.30%	Teo Eng Tee (Gerakan)	15,573	52.72%	29,539	2,193	73.00%
2008	N48 Skudai	Boo Cheng Hau (DAP)	23,214	68.22%	Teo Eng Tee (Gerakan)	10,270	30.18%	34,029	12,854	77.00%
2013	N48 Skudai	Boo Cheng Hau (DAP)	33,692	67.58%	Liang Ah Chy (MCA)	15,642	31.37%	49,859	18,050	88.00%
