= Chew Chong Sin =

Malaysian politician

- 周忠信

Member of the Johor State Legislative Assembly for Mengkibol
- In office 9 May 2018 – 11 July 2026
- Preceded by: Tan Hong Pin (PR–DAP)
- Succeeded by: Chu Poh Yee (PR–DAP)
- Majority: 19,226 (2018); 10,107 (2022)

Personal details
- Born: Chew Chong Sin; 9 August 1973 (age 53) Kluang, Johor
- Citizenship: Malaysian
- Party: Democratic Action Party (Malaysia) (DAP)
- Other political affiliations: Pakatan Harapan
- Education: SJK(C) Chung Hwa 3 SMK Sultan Abdul Jalil; Kluang High School; National University of Malaysia; University of Malaya
- Occupation: Politician

Chew Chong Sin

Chinese name
- Traditional Chinese: 周忠信
- Simplified Chinese: 周忠信
- Hanyu Pinyin: Zhōu Zhōngxìn
- Pha̍k-fa-sṳ: Chiû Chûng-sin
- Jyutping: Zau1 Zung1 Seon3
- Hokkien POJ: Chiu Tiong-sìn
- Tâi-lô: Tsiu Tiong-sìn

Chew Chong Sin is a Malaysian politician from DAP. He is the Member of Johor State Legislative Assembly for Mengkibol since 2018.

== Early career ==
Chew is a former bank manager in Kuala Lumpur, Asia Pacific region manager of a German company and Director of BPP Professional Education (United Kingdom), China branch. He was also a businessman in Shanghai.

He was also the Chairman of Chinese Student in UKM Committee and Secretary of Civil Rights Committee for the Kuala Lumpur and Selangor Chinese Assembly Hall.

== Political career ==
When he was in Shanghai, Chew established “Bersih Shanghai” in 2012, which actively campaigned ‘Jom Balik Undi’ (Go Back and Vote) in other countries. Bersih Shanghai had held several forums with other NGOs, activist and Malaysian political leaders to share their thoughts with Malaysians in Shanghai.

He is also a columnist who shares his opinion on current issues and economic issues in “Mirror of Shanghai” for Oriental Daily.

In July 2013, he returned to Malaysia and started campaigning with DAP during the 2013 Malaysian general election. Before that, he also helped the opposition to campaign in the 1999 and 2004 Malaysian general election.

In 2018, he joined DAP and contested the 2018 Malaysian general election as a Pakatan Harapan candidate and was chosen as the Member of Johor State Legislative Assembly for Mengkibol.

== Election result ==
Johor State Legislative Assembly
| Year | Constituency | Candidate | Votes | Pct. | Opponent(s) | Votes | Pct. | Ballots cast | Majority | Turnout |
|---|---|---|---|---|---|---|---|---|---|---|
| 2018 | N28 Mengkibol | Chew Chong Sin (DAP) | 29,559 | 72.80% | Chin Sim Lai (MCA) | 10,333 | 25.42% | 40,657 | 19,226 | 84.06% |
| 2022 | N28 Mengkibol | Chew Chong Sin (DAP) | 19,813 | 57.50% | Kelly Chye Pei Yee (MCA) | 9,706 | 28.17% | 34,455 | 10,107 | 51.92% |
| 2022 | N28 Mengkibol | Chew Chong Sin (DAP) | 19,813 | 57.50% | Wong Chan Giap (BERSATU) | 4,116 | 11.95% | 34,455 | 10,107 | 51.92% |

== Controversies ==
On 15 March 2019, Chew Chong Sin said that the Christchurch mosque shootings should be a lesson for Malaysia in racial and religious issues, for instance the collaboration between UMNO and PAS. After that, he retracted his statement due to misinterpretation.
