= Machap =

Coordinates: 2°22′N 102°19′E

- Mukim
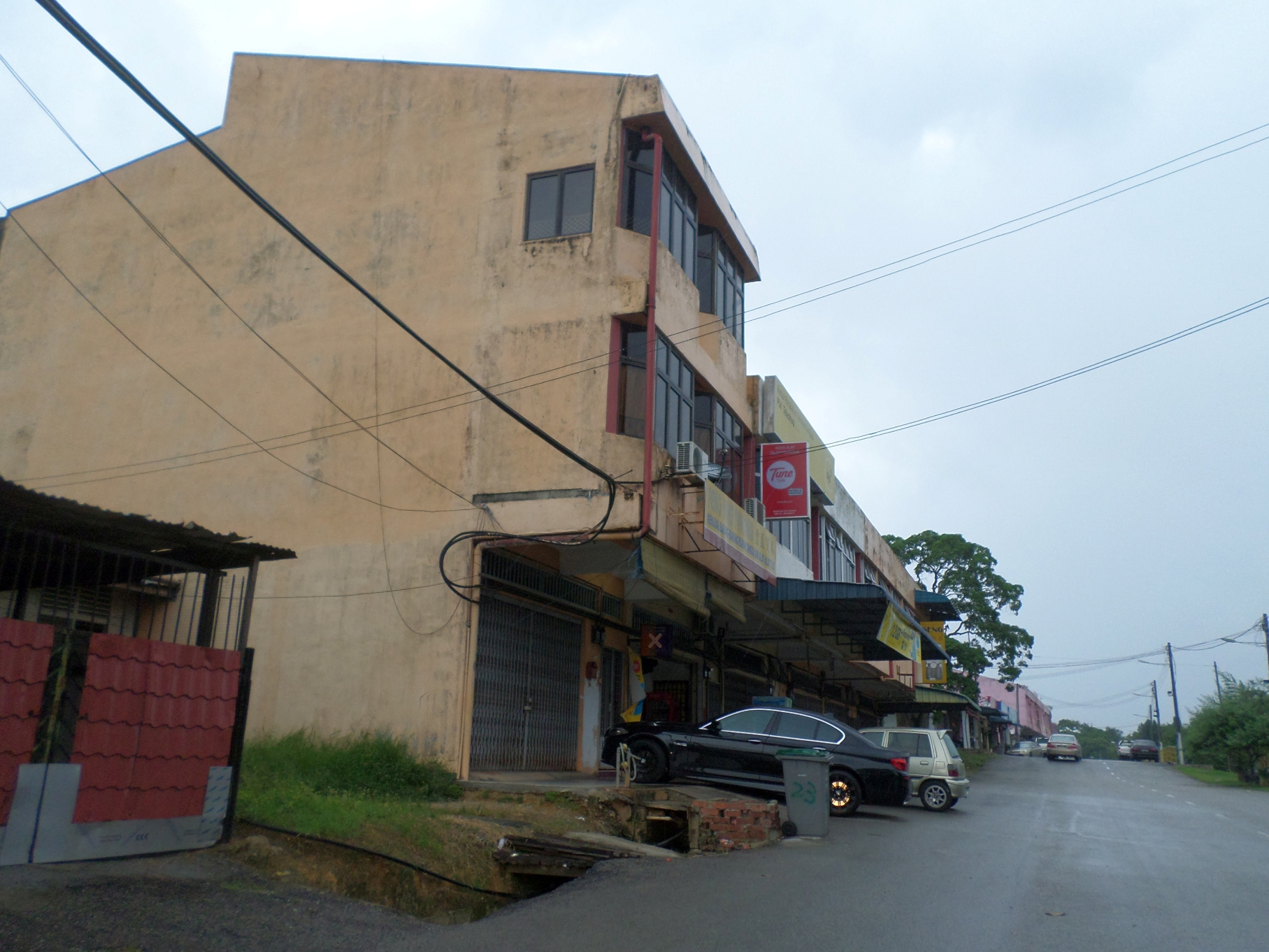
- Interactive map of Machap
- Country: Malaysia
- State: Johor
- District: Kluang

Area
  - Total: 118 km^{2} (46 sq mi)

Population
  - Total: 5,317
  - Density: 45.1/km^{2} (117/sq mi)

Machap is a mukim in South Kluang District, Johor, Malaysia. It is known for its pottery factories and though it has some pottery shops, there are not as many as in Ayer Hitam.

== Geography ==
Machap in Kluang District

The mukim spans over an area of 118 km^{2}.

== Demographics ==
The total population of the mukim is 5,317 people. 45 per cent of the constituency's population is Chinese, 38 per cent Malay, 15 per cent Indian and two per cent other races.

== Transportation ==
=== Road ===
The town is accessible by bus from Larkin Sentral (2, 888) in Johor Bahru.
