= Liew Chin Tong =

Malaysian politician and author

Yang Berhormat Tuan Liew Chin Tong MP
- 刘镇东
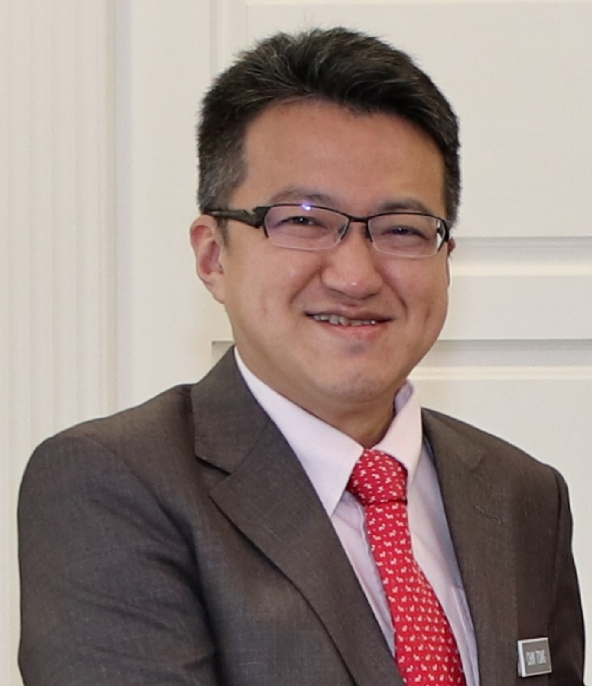
- Liew in 2020

Deputy Minister of Finance
- Incumbent
- Assumed office 17 December 2025
- Monarch: Ibrahim Iskandar
- Prime Minister: Anwar Ibrahim
- Minister: Anwar Ibrahim (Minister of Finance); Amir Hamzah Azizan (Minister of Finance II)
- Preceded by: Lim Hui Ying
- Constituency: Iskandar Puteri

Deputy Minister of Investment, Trade and Industry
- In office 5 April 2023 – 17 December 2025
- Monarchs: Abdullah (2023–2024); Ibrahim Iskandar (since 2024)
- Prime Minister: Anwar Ibrahim
- Minister: Tengku Zafrul Aziz
- Preceded by: Position established
- Succeeded by: Sim Tze Tzin
- Constituency: Iskandar Puteri

Deputy Minister of International Trade and Industry
- In office 10 December 2022 – 5 April 2023
- Monarch: Abdullah
- Prime Minister: Anwar Ibrahim
- Minister: Tengku Zafrul Aziz
- Preceded by: Lim Ban Hong
- Succeeded by: Position abolished
- Constituency: Iskandar Puteri

Deputy Minister of Defence
- In office 17 July 2018 – 24 February 2020
- Monarchs: Muhammad V (2018–2019); Abdullah (2019–2020)
- Prime Minister: Mahathir Mohamad
- Minister: Mohamad Sabu
- Preceded by: Mohd Johari Baharum
- Succeeded by: Ikmal Hisham Abdul Aziz
- Constituency: Senator

State Leader of the Opposition of Johor
- In office 10 April 2022 – 11 December 2022
- Monarch: Ibrahim Iskandar
- Menteri Besar: Onn Hafiz Ghazi
- Preceded by: Aminolhuda Hassan
- Succeeded by: Andrew Chen Kah Eng
- Constituency: Perling

Member of the Malaysian Parliament for Iskandar Puteri
- Incumbent
- Assumed office 19 November 2022
- Preceded by: Lim Kit Siang (PH–DAP)
- Majority: 60,036 (2022)

Member of the Johor State Legislative Assembly for Perling
- In office 12 March 2022 – 11 July 2026
- Preceded by: Cheo Yee How (PH–DAP)
- Succeeded by: Pannir Selvam Paliksina (BN-MIC)
- Majority: 3,347 (2022)

Member of the Malaysian Parliament for Kluang
- In office 5 May 2013 – 9 May 2018
- Preceded by: Hou Kok Chung (BN–MCA)
- Succeeded by: Wong Shu Qi (PH–DAP)
- Majority: 7,359 (2013)

Member of the Malaysian Parliament for Bukit Bendera
- In office 8 March 2008 – 5 May 2013
- Preceded by: Chia Kwang Chye (BN–GERAKAN)
- Succeeded by: Zairil Khir Johari (PR–DAP)
- Majority: 16,112 (2008)

National Stretagic Director of the Democratic Action Party
- Incumbent
- Assumed office 16 March 2025
- Secretary-General: Anthony Loke Siew Fook
- Preceded by: Position established

Deputy Secretary-General of the Democratic Action Party
- In office 20 March 2022 – 16 March 2025 Serving with Sivakumar Varatharaju & Tengku Zulpuri Shah Raja Puji
- Secretary-General: Anthony Loke Siew Fook
- Preceded by: Nga Kor Ming
- Succeeded by: Steven Sim Chee Keong

State Committee Member of the Democratic Action Party of Johor
- Incumbent
- Assumed office 6 October 2024 Serving with Pang Hok Liong, Marina Ibrahim, Ng Yak Howe, Shazwan Zdainal Abidin & Ruban Arumugam
- Secretary-General: Anthony Loke Siew Fook
- State Chairperson: Teo Nie Ching

Senator Appointed by the Yang di-Pertuan Agong
- In office 17 July 2018 – 16 July 2021
- Monarchs: Muhammad V (2018–2019); Abdullah (2019–2021)
- Prime Minister: Mahathir Mohamad (2018–2020); Muhyiddin Yassin (2020–2021)

Personal details
- Born: Liew Chin Tong; 27 November 1977 (age 48) Subang Jaya, Selangor, Malaysia
- Citizenship: Malaysian
- Party: Democratic Action Party (DAP) (since 1999)
- Other political affiliations: Barisan Alternatif (BA) (1999–2004); Pakatan Rakyat (PR) (2008–2015); Pakatan Harapan (PH) (since 2015)
- Education: Australian National University; University of Malaya
- Occupation: Politician; author
- Website: liewchintong.com

Liew Chin Tong (simplified Chinese: 刘镇东; traditional Chinese: 劉鎮東; pinyin: Liú Zhèndōng; Pe̍h-ōe-jī: Lâu Tìn-tong; born 27 November 1977) is a Malaysian politician and author who has served as the deputy minister of investment, trade and industry in the Unity Government administration under Prime Minister Anwar Ibrahim and Minister Tengku Zafrul Aziz since April 2023, Member of Parliament (MP) for Iskandar Puteri since November 2022 and Member of the Johor State Legislative Assembly (MLA) for Perling since March 2022. He served as deputy minister of international trade and industry in the PH administration under Prime Minister Anwar and Minister Tengku Zafrul from December 2022 to April 2023, State Leader of the Opposition of Johor from April 2022 to his reappointment as a deputy minister in December 2022, the Deputy Minister of Defence in the PH administration under former prime minister Mahathir Mohamad and former minister Mohamad Sabu from July 2018 to the collapse of the PH administration in February 2020, senator from July 2018 to July 2021 and the MP for Kluang from May 2013 to May 2018 and Bukit Bendera from March 2008 to May 2013. He is a member of the Democratic Action Party (DAP), a component party of the PH coalition. He has served as the National Strategic Director of DAP since March 2025 and the State Committee Member of DAP of Johor since October 2024. He served as Deputy Secretary-General of DAP from March 2022 to March 2025 and was the National Political Education Director of DAP and the State Chairman of DAP of Johor.

== Background ==
Liew was born on 27 November 1977 at Subang Jaya, Selangor. He had his early education at Kwang Hua Private High School up to 1995 before he pursued his tertiary education at Australian National University (ANU) and graduated with Bachelor of Asian Studies (Honours) and Bachelor of Arts in Political Science in 2004. He later obtained International Masters in Regional Integration at Asia-Europe Institute, University of Malaya (UM) in 2006.

Liew previously was the executive director of Penang Institute (previously Socio-Economic and Environmental Research Institute, SERI), 2009-2012 and executive director of Research for Social Advancement (REFSA), 2007–2011. He was also former visiting research fellow, Institute of Southeast Asian Studies (ISEAS), Singapore.

In 1999, Liew joined the Democratic Action Party (DAP).

== Political career ==
Liew was first elected to the Malaysian Parliament in the 2008 general election winning the constituency of Bukit Bendera, Penang. A political strategist prior to his election, Liew has been credited for masterminding Pakatan Rakyat's takeover of the Penang State Legislative Assembly. In the 2013 general election, Liew wrestled the Kluang parliamentary seat in Johor from the predecessor, Malaysian Chinese Association (MCA)'s Hou Kok Chung. In May 2018, he contested for the Ayer Hitam federal seat against the incumbent, Wee Ka Siong, who is also then-Deputy President of the Malaysian Chinese Association (MCA), a component party of the Barisan Nasional (BN) coalition. Liew was narrowly defeated by 303 votes in the 2018 general election which then-Opposition coalition PH coalition claimed victory and ousted the then-ruling BN coalition from the administration for the first time.

In 2017, Liew pointed out that the overall prices of goods had increased since 2013 general election due to the combined effects of GST implementation, a 30 percent depreciation of the ringgit since October 2014, and successive subsidy cuts. He said Prime Minister Najib Razak and the government should cease blaming the victims of their failed economic policies.

=== Deputy defence minister ===
Liew was appointed deputy defence minister on 17 July 2018 until 24 February 2020, being the first Malaysian not of Malay descent to hold this office. During his tenure, together with then-defence minister Mohamad Sabu, the Ministry of Defence unveiled the inaugural Defence White Paper (DWP), a blueprint on building a national policy on defence and security. The DWP is an open document containing the direction and priorities of defence for a period of 10 years, from 2021 to 2030, spanning the 12th and 13th Malaysia Plans.

=== Deputy secretary-general of DAP ===
On 20 March 2022, on the 17th DAP National Congress, Liew was re-elected into the Central Executive Committee with 1008 votes, the 22nd highest vote. He was then appointed deputy secretary-general in the 17th DAP CEC under current secretary-general, Anthony Loke.

== Bibliography ==
=== Books ===
- Liew Chin Tong (2024), Second Takeoff
- Liew Chin Tong (2021), Lim Kit Siang: Patriot. Leader. Fighter
- Liew Chin Tong (2020), The Great Reset: 100 Days of Malaysia's Triple Crisis
- Liew Chin Tong (2013), Putrajaya Milik Siapa?: Genta Media
- Liew Chin Tong (2013), Middle Malaysia: Centre Ground Is Battle Ground: Genta Media
- Liew Chin Tong (2009), Speaking for the reformasi generation Kuala Lumpur: Research for Social Advancement (REFSA)

=== Journals ===
- Liew Chin Tong and Francis Hutchison (2010), “Implementing Pro-Employment Policies at the Sub-national Level” in Ooi Kee Beng and Goh Ban Lee (eds) Pilot Studies for a New Penang, Penang: Socio-Economic and Environmental Research Institute (SERI), pp. 111–128.
- Liew Chin Tong (2007), “PAS’ Leadership: New Faces and Old Constraints" in Lorraine C. Salazar and Daljit Singh (eds) Southeast Asian Affairs 2007, Singapore: Institute of Southeast Asian Studies, pp. 201–213
- Liew Chin Tong (2007), “PAS politics: defining an Islamic State” in Edmund Terence Gomez Politics in Malaysia: the Malay dimension Oxon: Routledge, pp. 107–137.
- William F. Case and Liew Chin Tong (2006) How Committed Is PAS to Democracy and How Do We Know It? Contemporary Southeast Asia, Volume 28, Number 3, December 2006, pp. 385–406

=== Chinese Books ===
- 《追寻理想国家：马来西亚政治史上的林吉祥》(2021) 吉隆坡：义腾研究中心
- 《大复兴：马来西亚三重危机下的百日反思》(2020)吉隆坡：义腾研究中心
- 《决战在中间：共创马来西亚2.0》(2013) 吉隆坡：众意出版
- 《小市民的政治经济学》（2011）吉隆坡：众意出版
- 《华教运动，动或不动》（2011）吉隆坡：新纪元学院校友会
- 《亮剑—踢爆马来政治》（2007）吉隆坡：义腾研究中心

== Election results ==
Parliament of Malaysia
Year	Constituency	Candidate	Votes	Pct	Opponent(s)	Votes	Pct	Ballots cast	Majority	Turnout
2008	P048 Bukit Bendera	Liew Chin Tong (DAP)	31,243	66.45%	Chia Kwang Chye (Gerakan)	15,131	32.18%	47,016	16,112	72.98%
2013	P152 Kluang	Liew Chin Tong (DAP)	40,574	54.99%	Hou Kok Chung (MCA)	33,215	45.01%	75,308	7,359	86.78%
2018	P148 Ayer Hitam	Liew Chin Tong (DAP)	16,773	43.20%	Wee Ka Siong (MCA)	17,076	43.98%	38,824	303	85.52%
2018	P148 Ayer Hitam	Liew Chin Tong (DAP)	16,773	43.20%	Mardi Marwan (PAS)	4,975	12.82%	38,824	303	85.52%
2022	P162 Iskandar Puteri	Liew Chin Tong (DAP)	96,819	59.15%	Jason Teoh Sew Hock (MCA)	36,783	22.47%	163,680	60,036	74.42%
2022	P162 Iskandar Puteri	Liew Chin Tong (DAP)	96,819	59.15%	Tan Nam Cha (BERSATU)	30,078	18.38%	163,680	60,036	74.42%

Johor State Legislative Assembly
Year	Constituency	Candidate	Votes	Pct	Opponent(s)	Votes	Pct	Ballots cast	Majority	Turnout
2022	N46 Perling	Liew Chin Tong (DAP)	18,628	43.59%	Tan Hiang Kee (MCA)	15,281	35.76%	42,738	3,347	43.28%
2022	N46 Perling	Liew Chin Tong (DAP)	18,628	43.59%	Koo Shiaw Lee (Gerakan)	8,829	20.66%	42,738	3,347	43.28%

== Honours ==
=== Honours of Malaysia ===
- Malaysia
  - Recipient of the 17th Yang di-Pertuan Agong Installation Medal (2024)
