= Skudai (state constituency) =

Political subdivision in Malaysia

Skudai (N48)
Johor constituency

State constituency
- Legislature: Johor State Legislative Assembly
MLA
Kartiyaini Jeyapalan
PH
- Constituency created: 1974
- Constituency abolished: 1986
- Constituency re-created: 1994
- First contested: 1974
- Last contested: 2026

Demographics
- Population (2020): 137,832
- Electors (2026): 106,805
- Area (km²): 38

Skudai is a state constituency in Johor, Malaysia, that is represented in the Johor State Legislative Assembly.

The state constituency was first contested in 1974 and is mandated to return a single Assemblyman to the Johor State Legislative Assembly under the first-past-the-post voting system.

== Demographics ==
As of 2020, Skudai has a population of 137,832 people.

Ethnic breakdown of Skudai's electorate as of 2026
1. Chinese (61.1%)
2. Malay (22.4%)
3. Indian (14.0%)
4. Other ethnics (2.30%)

== History ==
=== Polling districts ===
According to the federal gazette issued on 2 July 2026, the Skudai constituency has a total of 21 polling districts.

State constituency	Polling District	Code	Location
Skudai (N48)	Jaya Mas	162/48/01	SK Taman Selesa Jaya
Skudai (N48)	Selesa Jaya	162/48/02	SA Bandar Selesa Jaya
Skudai (N48)	Sri Sinding	162/48/03	SMK Taman Selesa Jaya
Skudai (N48)	Impian Emas	162/48/04	SK Taman Impian Emas
Skudai (N48)	Sri Skudai	162/48/05	SMK Skudai; SA An-Nur Batu 10 Skudai
Skudai (N48)	Bandar Skudai Barat	162/48/06	SK Sekudai Batu 10
Skudai (N48)	Bandar Skudai Tengah	162/48/07	SJK (C) Pu Sze
Skudai (N48)	Bandar Skudai Timor	162/48/08	SJK (C) Pu Sze
Skudai (N48)	Hang Tuah	162/48/09	SK Taman Skudai Baru; SA Taman Skudai Baru
Skudai (N48)	Laksamana Tuta	162/48/10	SK Taman Tun Aminah
Skudai (N48)	Nakhota Tuta	162/48/11	SMK Taman Tun Aminah; SMK Taman Sutera
Skudai (N48)	Flat Perkasa 'A' Tuta	162/48/12	SJK (T) Taman Tun Aminah
Skudai (N48)	Taman Damai Jaya	162/48/13	SK Taman Damai Jaya; SA Taman Damai Jaya
Skudai (N48)	Desa Skudai	162/48/14	SK Sri Skudai; Dewan Raya Taman Sri Skudai; SK Taman Desa Skudai
Skudai (N48)	Hang Jebat	162/48/15	SMK Damai Jaya; SMK Taman Selesa Jaya 2; SK Taman Skudai Baru 2
Skudai (N48)	Perwira Tuta	162/48/16	Dewan Raya Taman Ungku Tun Aminah
Skudai (N48)	Hulubalang Tuta	162/48/17	SK Taman Tun Aminah 2
Skudai (N48)	Skudai Utara	162/48/18	SJK (C) Kuo Kuang
Skudai (N48)	Flat Perkasa 'B' Tuta	162/48/19	SA Taman Ungku Tun Aminah
Skudai (N48)	Taman Jaya	162/48/20	SMK Taman Impian Emas
Skudai (N48)	Bukit Impian	162/48/21	SJK (C) Thai Hong

=== Representation history ===
Members of the Legislative Assembly for Skudai
Assembly	No	Years	Member	Party
Constituency created from Gelang Patah and Tampoi
4th	N30	1974-1978	Elias Udin	BN (UMNO)
5th	N30	1978-1982	Ali Othman	BN (UMNO)
6th	N30	1982-1986	Mahmud Daud	BN (UMNO)
Constituency split into Tiram, Gelang Patah, Kulai, Tambatan and Gertak Merah
Constituency recreated from Kulai and Gelang Patah
9th	N38	1995-1999	Wong Siew Poh (黃秀寶)	BN (GERAKAN)
10th	N38	1999-2004	Khoo Kong Ek (邱光益)	BN (GERAKAN)
11th	N48	2004-2008	Teo Eng Tee @ Teo Kok Chee (張國智)	BN (GERAKAN)
12th	N48	2008-2013	Boo Cheng Hau (巫程豪)	PR (DAP)
13th	N48	2013–2015	Boo Cheng Hau (巫程豪)	PR (DAP)
13th	N48	2015-2018	Boo Cheng Hau (巫程豪)	PH (DAP)
14th	N48	2018-2022	Tan Hong Pin (陈泓宾)	PH (DAP)
15th	N48	2022–2026	Marina Ibrahim (مارينا إبراهيم)	PH (DAP)
16th	N48	2026–present	Kartiyaini Jeyapalan (கார்த்தியாயினி ஜெயபாலன்)	PH (DAP)

== Election results ==
Johor state election, 2026
Party	Candidate	Votes	%	∆%
PH	Kartiyaini Jeyapalan	39,821	58.74	▲0.21
BN	Tan Hiang Kee	24,541	36.20	▲8.63
BERSAMA	Eugene Chua Meng Chong	2,471	3.64	▲3.64
Socialist Party of Malaysia	Amir Syafiq Ameer Soekre	964	1.42	▲1.42
Total valid votes		67,797	100.00	
Total rejected ballots		785		
Unreturned ballots		58		
Turnout		68,640	64.27	▲19.39
Registered electors		106,805		
Majority		15,280	22.54	▼8.42
PH hold		Swing		?

Johor state election, 2022
Party	Candidate	Votes	%	∆%
PH	Marina Ibrahim	26,359	58.53	▼20.94
BN	Lim Soon Hai	12,416	27.57	▲27.57
PN	Khoo Kong Ek	6,258	13.90	▲13.90
Total valid votes		45,033	100.00	
Total rejected ballots		604		
Unreturned ballots		507		
Turnout		46,144	44.87	▼40.34
Registered electors		102,828		
Majority		13,943	30.96	▼27.98
PH hold		Swing		

Johor state election, 2018
Party	Candidate	Votes	%	∆%
PKR	Tan Hong Pin	47,359	79.47	▲11.18
BN	S. Kanan a/l G. Suppiah	12,233	20.53	▲20.53
Total valid votes		59,592	100.00	
Total rejected ballots		726		
Unreturned ballots		122		
Turnout		60,440	85.21	▼3.30
Registered electors		70,928		
Majority		35,126	58.94	▲22.36
PKR hold		Swing		-

Johor state election, 2013
Party	Candidate	Votes	%	∆%
DAP	Boo Cheng Hau	33,692	68.29	▼0.95
BN	Liang Ah Chy	15,642	31.71	▲31.71
Total valid votes		49,334	100.00	
Total rejected ballots		624		
Unreturned ballots		90		
Turnout		50,048	88.51	▲11.97
Registered electors		56,543		
Majority		18,050	36.59	▼1.90
DAP hold		Swing		

Johor state election, 2008
Party	Candidate	Votes	%	∆%
DAP	Boo Cheng Hau	23,124	69.25	▲23.03
BN	Teo Eng Tee	10,270	30.75	▼23.03
Total valid votes		33,394	100.00	
Total rejected ballots		590		
Unreturned ballots		45		
Turnout		34,029	76.54	▲3.18
Registered electors		44,459		
Majority		12,854	38.49	▲30.92
DAP gain from BN		Swing		-

Johor state election, 2004
Party	Candidate	Votes	%	∆%
BN	Teo Eng Tee	15,573	53.79	▼12.20
DAP	Boo Cheng Hau	13,380	46.21	▲12.20
Total valid votes		28,953	100.00	
Total rejected ballots		562		
Unreturned ballots		24		
Turnout		29,539	73.36	▼2.28
Registered electors		40,268		
Majority		2,193	7.57	▼24.41
BN hold		Swing		

Johor state election, 1999
Party	Candidate	Votes	%	∆%
BN	Khoo Kong Ek	23,042	65.99	▲3.66
DAP	Boo Cheng Hau	11,875	34.01	▼2.79
Total valid votes		34,917	100.00	
Total rejected ballots		732		
Unreturned ballots		70		
Turnout		35,719	75.63	▼2.98
Registered electors		47,226		
Majority		11,167	31.98	▲6.44
BN hold		Swing		

Johor state election, 1995
Party	Candidate	Votes	%	∆%
BN	Wong Siew Poh	18,746	62.33	
DAP	Chan Jock Lan	11,066	36.80	
Independent	Allan Low Yew Hoe	261	0.87	
Total valid votes		30,073	100.00	
Total rejected ballots		867		
Unreturned ballots		53		
Turnout		30,993	78.61	
Registered electors		39,426		
Majority		7,680	25.54	
BN hold		Swing		

Johor state election, 1982
Party	Candidate	Votes	%	∆%
BN	Mahmood Daud	21,316	77.22	
Parti Sosialis Rakyat Malaysia	Hassan Abdul Karim	6,287	22.78	
Total valid votes		27,603	100.00	
Total rejected ballots		1,050		
Unreturned ballots		0		
Turnout		28,653	74.03	▲74.03
Registered electors		38,702		
Majority		15,029	54.45	▲54.45
BN hold		Swing		

Johor state election, 1978
Party	Candidate	Votes	%	∆%
On the nomination day, Ali Othman won uncontested.
BN	Ali Othman			
Total valid votes				
Total rejected ballots				
Unreturned ballots				
Turnout				
Registered electors		26,360		
Majority				
BN hold		Swing		

Johor state election, 1974
Party	Candidate	Votes	%
BN	Elias Udin	8,951	70.40
Parti Sosialis Rakyat Malaysia	Abdul Razak Ahmad	2,246	17.66
DAP	Abdullah Abd. Hamid	1,518	11.94
Total valid votes		12,715	100.00
Total rejected ballots		913	
Unreturned ballots		0	
Turnout		13,628	73.57
Registered electors		18,525	
Majority		6,705	52.73
This was a new constituency created.
