= Wong Shu Qi =

Malaysian politician

Yang Berhormat Puan Wong Shu Qi MP
- 黄书琪

Chairperson of the Talent Corporation Malaysia Berhad
- Incumbent
- Assumed office 12 June 2024
- Minister: Steven Sim Chee Keong
- Deputy: Mohd Khuzzan Abu Bakar
- Chief Executive Officer: Chan Leng Wai

Deputy Chairperson of the Public Accounts Committee
- In office 4 April 2023 – 16 July 2024
- Nominated by: Anwar Ibrahim
- Appointed by: Johari Abdul
- Chairperson: Mas Ermieyati Samsudin
- Preceded by: Azizah Mohd Dun
- Succeeded by: Teresa Kok Suh Sim
- Constituency: Kluang

Member of the Malaysian Parliament for Kluang
- Incumbent
- Assumed office 9 May 2018
- Preceded by: Liew Chin Tong (PR–DAP)
- Majority: 23,053 (2018); 26,406 (2022)

Member of the Johor State Legislative Assembly for Senai
- In office 5 May 2013 – 9 May 2018
- Preceded by: Ong Kow Meng (PR–DAP)
- Succeeded by: Alan Tee Boon Tsong (PH–DAP)
- Majority: 11,227 (2013)

Assistant National Publicity Secretary of the Democratic Action Party
- Incumbent
- Assumed office 16 March 2025 Serving with Young Syefura Othman
- Secretary-General: Anthony Loke Siew Fook
- National Publicity Secretary: Yeo Bee Yin
- Preceded by: Ganabatirau Veraman

Assistant National Political Education Director of the Democratic Action Party
- In office 20 March 2022 – 16 March 2025
- Secretary-General: Anthony Loke Siew Fook
- Political Education Director: Wong Kah Woh
- Preceded by: Ong Kian Ming
- Succeeded by: Vivian Wong Shir Yee

State Deputy Chairperson of the Democratic Action Party of Johor
- Incumbent
- Assumed office 6 October 2024
- Secretary-General: Anthony Loke Siew Fook
- State Chairperson: Teo Nie Ching
- Preceded by: Teo Nie Ching

Personal details
- Born: 26 November 1983 (age 42) Johor, Malaysia
- Citizenship: Malaysian
- Party: Democratic Action Party (DAP)
- Other political affiliations: Pakatan Rakyat (PR) (2008–2015); Pakatan Harapan (PH) (since 2015)
- Education: National Chengchi University (Bachelor of Journalism (B. J.) & Bachelor of Political Science); Lee Kuan Yew School of Public Policy (Master in Public Management (MPP))
- Occupation: Politician
- Profession: Writer; journalist
- Website: https://wongshuqi.my/

Wong Shu Qi

Chinese name
- Traditional Chinese: 黃書琪
- Simplified Chinese: 黄书琪
Transcriptions
Standard Mandarin
- Hanyu Pinyin: Huáng Shūqí
Southern Min
- Hokkien POJ: N̂g Su-kî

Wong Shu Qi (simplified Chinese: 黄书琪; traditional Chinese: 黃書琪; pinyin: Huáng Shūqí; Pe̍h-ōe-jī: N̂g Su-kî; born 26 November 1983) is a Malaysian politician, writer and journalist who has served as Chairperson of the Talent Corporation Malaysia Berhad (TalentCorp) since June 2024 and the Member of Parliament (MP) for Kluang since May 2018. She served as Deputy Chairperson of the Public Accounts Committee (PAC) from April 2023 to July 2024 and Member of the Johor State Legislative Assembly (MLA) for the Senai from May 2013 to May 2018. She is a member of the Democratic Action Party (DAP), a component party of the Pakatan Harapan (PH) coalition. She has also served as the Assistant National Publicity Secretary of DAP since March 2025 and the State Deputy Chairperson of DAP of Johor since October 2024. She also served as the Assistant National Political Education Director of DAP from March 2022 to March 2025.

== Political career ==
She was elected in 2013 general election for the Senai state seat. In the 2018 general election, Wong was elected to the Parliament of Malaysia for the Kluang constituency, winning 47,671 of the 80,531 votes cast.

== Election results ==
Johor State Legislative Assembly
| Year | Constituency | Candidate | Votes | Pct | Opponent(s) | Votes | Pct | Ballots cast | Majority | Turnout |
|---|---|---|---|---|---|---|---|---|---|---|
| 2013 | N52 Senai | Wong Shu Qi (DAP) | 23,110 | 65.19% | Tang Nai Soon (MCA) | 11,883 | 33.52% | 35,451 | 11,227 | 88.38% |

Parliament of Malaysia
| Year | Constituency | Candidate | Votes | Pct | Opponent(s) | Votes | Pct | Ballots cast | Majority | Turnout |
|---|---|---|---|---|---|---|---|---|---|---|
| 2018 | P152 Kluang | Wong Shu Qi (DAP) | 47,671 | 59.20% | Gan Ping Sieu (MCA) | 24,618 | 30.57% | 81,841 | 23,053 | 84.45% |
| 2018 | P152 Kluang | Wong Shu Qi (DAP) | 47,671 | 59.20% | Muhd Hasbullah Md Najib (PAS) | 8,242 | 10.23% | 81,841 | 23,053 | 84.45% |
| 2022 | P152 Kluang | Wong Shu Qi (DAP) | 49,801 | 52.08% | Gan Ping Sieu (MCA) | 23,395 | 24.47% | 95,621 | 26,406 | 72.25% |
| 2022 | P152 Kluang | Wong Shu Qi (DAP) | 49,801 | 52.08% | Dzulkarnain Alias (BERSATU) | 22,021 | 23.03% | 95,621 | 26,406 | 72.25% |
| 2022 | P152 Kluang | Wong Shu Qi (DAP) | 49,801 | 52.08% | Ramendran Ulaganathan (IND) | 404 | 0.42% | 95,621 | 26,406 | 72.25% |

== Honours ==
=== Honours of Malaysia ===
- Malaysia
  - Recipient of the 17th Yang di-Pertuan Agong Installation Medal (2024)
- Johor
  - Recipient of Sultan Ibrahim Ismail Coronation Medal (2015)
