= Mengkibol (state constituency) =

Political subdivision in Malaysia

Mengkibol (N28)
Johor constituency
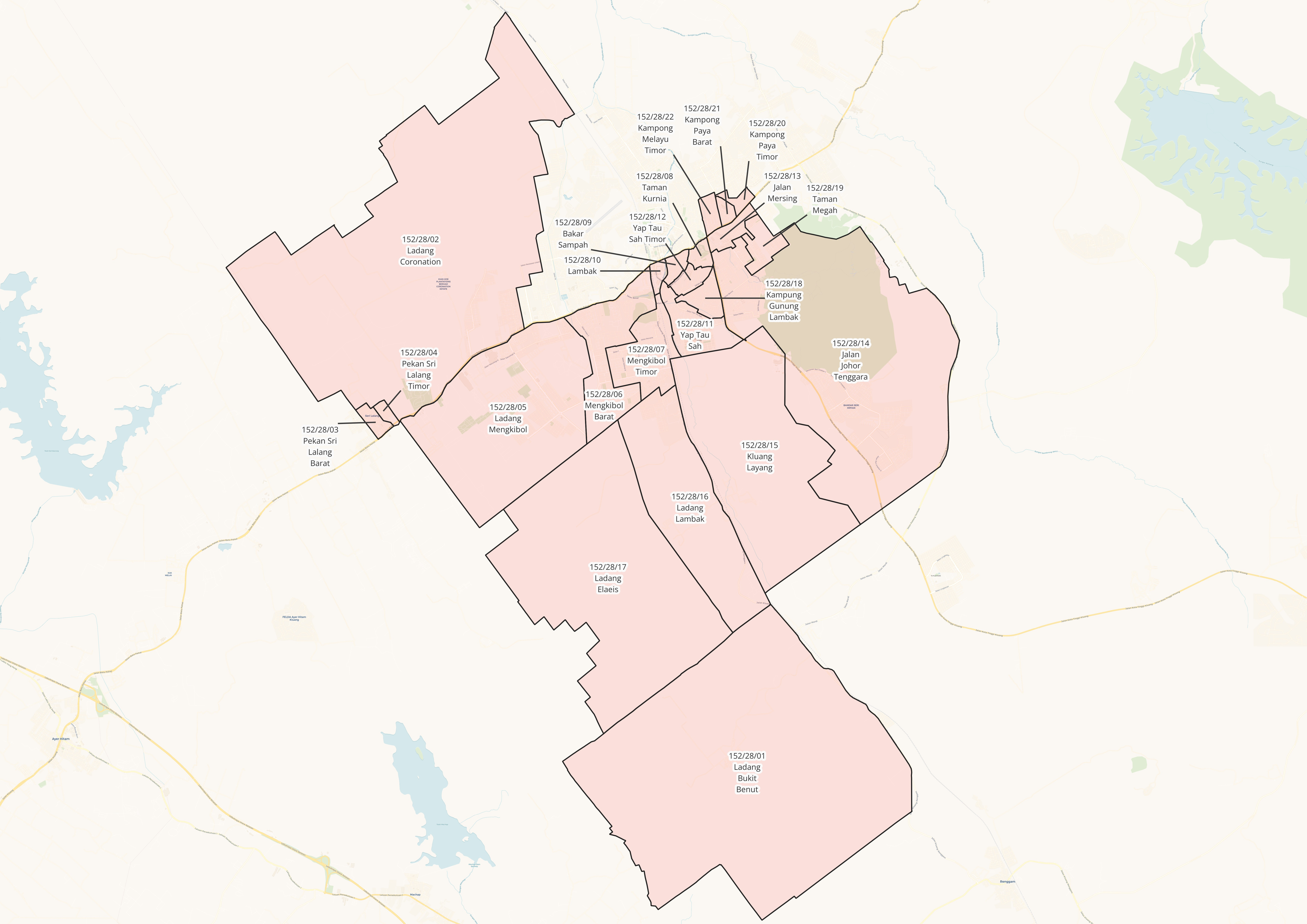

State constituency
- Legislature: Johor State Legislative Assembly
MLA
Chu Poh Yee
PH
- Constituency created: 1994
- First contested: 1995
- Last contested: 2022

Demographics
- Population (2020): 104,148
- Electors (2026): 68,457
- Area (km²): 196

Mengkibol is a state constituency in Johor, Malaysia, that is represented in the Johor State Legislative Assembly.

The state constituency was first contested in 1995 and is mandated to return a single Assemblyman to the Johor State Legislative Assembly under the first-past-the-post voting system.

== Demographics ==
As of 2020, Mengkibol has a population of 104,148 people.

Ethnic breakdown of Mengkibol's electorate as of 2026
1. Chinese (55.9%)
2. Malay (30.3%)
3. Indian (12.9%)
4. Other ethnicities (0.90%)

== History ==
=== Polling districts ===
According to the gazette issued on 2 July 2026, the Mengkibol constituency has a total of 22 polling districts.

State constituency	Polling districts	Code	Location
Mengkibol (N28)	Ladang Bukit Benut	152/28/01	SA Ladang Bukit Benut
Mengkibol (N28)	Ladang Coronation	152/28/02	SA Taman Desa
Mengkibol (N28)	Pekan Sri Lalang Barat	152/28/03	Dewan Raya Sri Lalang
Mengkibol (N28)	Pekan Sri Lalang Timor	152/28/04	SJK (T) Ladang Niyor
Mengkibol (N28)	Ladang Mengkibol	152/28/05	SA Seri Taman Kluang Barat; SK Seri Taman Kluang Barat
Mengkibol (N28)	Mengkibol Barat	152/28/06	SK Seri Intan
Mengkibol (N28)	Mengkibol Timor	152/28/07	Kolej Vokesional Kluang; SA Taman Delima
Mengkibol (N28)	Taman Kurnia	152/28/08	SMA Arabiah Kluang
Mengkibol (N28)	Bakar Sampah	152/28/09	SJK (C) Chong Hwa 2
Mengkibol (N28)	Lambak	152/28/10	SJK (C) Chong Hwa 1
Mengkibol (N28)	Yap Tau Sah	152/28/11	SJK (C) Pin Ming
Mengkibol (N28)	Yap Tau Sah Timor	152/28/12	SMJK Chong Hwa
Mengkibol (N28)	Jalan Mersing	152/28/13	SK Abdul Rahman Yassin
Mengkibol (N28)	Jalan Johor Tenggara	152/28/14	SA Dato' Ahmad; SMK Jalan Kota Tinggi
Mengkibol (N28)	Kluang Layang	152/28/15	SMK Jalan Mengkibol
Mengkibol (N28)	Ladang Lambak	152/28/16	SJK (T) Ladang Lambak
Mengkibol (N28)	Ladang Elaeis	152/28/17	SJK (T) Ladang Lambak
Mengkibol (N28)	Kampung Gunung Lambak	152/28/18	SJK (C) Chong Hwa 3
Mengkibol (N28)	Taman Megah	152/28/19	Dewan Muafakat Kg. Dato Abdul Rahman Yassin
Mengkibol (N28)	Kampong Paya Timor	152/28/20	SJK (C) Pa Yai
Mengkibol (N28)	Kampong Paya Barat	152/28/21	SJK (C) Pa Yai
Mengkibol (N28)	Kampong Melayu Timor	152/28/22	Dewan Seberguna Kg. Paya

=== Representation history ===
Members of the Legislative Assembly for Mengkibol
Assembly	No	Years	Member	Party
Constituency created from Gunung Lambak and Paloh
9th	N12	1995-1999	Ng Kim Lai (黃金來)	BN (MCA)
10th	N12	1999-2004	Ng Kim Lai (黃金來)	BN (MCA)
11th	N28	2004-2008	Gan Ping Sieu (顏炳壽)	BN (MCA)
12th	N28	2008-2013	Ng Lam Hua (黃南華)	PR (DAP)
13th	N28	2013-2015	Tan Hong Pin (陳泓賓)	PR (DAP)
13th	N28	2015-2018	Tan Hong Pin (陳泓賓)	PH (DAP)
14th	N28	2018-2022	Chew Chong Sin (周忠信)	PH (DAP)
15th	N28	2022–2026	Chew Chong Sin (周忠信)	PH (DAP)
16th	N28	2026-present	Chu Poh Yee (徐寶儀）	PH (DAP)

== Election results ==
Johor state election, 2026
Party	Candidate	Votes	%	∆%
PH	Chu Poh Yee	23,768	54.86	▼4.05
BN	Warren Yap Zhi Peng	19,555	45.14	▲16.25
Total valid votes		43,323	100.00	
Total rejected ballots		486		
Unreturned ballots		110		
Turnout		43,919	64.16	▲12.24
Registered electors		68,457		
Majority		4,213	9.72	▼20.32
PH hold		Swing		

Johor state election, 2022
Party	Candidate	Votes	%	∆%
PH	Chew Chong Sin	19,813	58.91	▲58.91
BN	Kelly Chye Pei Yee	9,706	28.89	▲16.00
PN	Wong Chan Giap	4,116	12.24	▲11.95
Total valid votes		33,635	97.62	
Total rejected ballots		574	1.67	
Unreturned ballots		246	0.71	
Turnout		34,455	51.92	▼32.14
Registered electors		66,362		
Majority		10,107	30.02	▼44.20
PH hold		Swing		

Johor state election, 2018
Party	Candidate	Votes	%	∆%
PKR	Chew Chong Sin	29,559	87.11	▲87.11
BN	Chin Sim Lai	10,333	12.89	▼23.16
Total valid votes		33,932	98.22	
Total rejected ballots		560	1.38	
Unreturned ballots		205	0.50	
Turnout		40,657	84.06	▼2.64
Registered electors		48,365		
Majority		19,226	74.22	▲46.56
PKR hold		Swing		
Source(s) "RESULTS OF CONTESTED ELECTION AND STATEMENTS OF THE POLL AFTER THE OFFICIAL ADDITION OF VOTES".

Johor state election, 2013
Party	Candidate	Votes	%	∆%
DAP	Tan Hong Pin	23,036	63.71	▲11.23
BN	Chye Kwee Yeow	13,035	36.05	▼11.47
Independent	Ng Lam Hua	85	0.24	▲0.24
Total valid votes		36,156	98.35	
Total rejected ballots		527	1.43	
Unreturned ballots		80	0.22	
Turnout		36,763	86.70	▲10.91
Registered electors		42,380		
Majority		10,001	27.66	▲22.70
DAP hold		Swing		
Source(s) "KEPUTUSAN PILIHAN RAYA UMUM DEWAN UNDANGAN NEGERI".

Johor state election, 2008
Party	Candidate	Votes	%	∆%
DAP	Ng Lam Hua	13,538	52.48	▲20.41
BN	Gan Ping Sieu	12,257	47.52	▲20.41
Total valid votes		25,795	96.55	
Total rejected ballots		561	2.10	
Unreturned ballots		361	1.35	
Turnout		26,717	75.79	▲0.98
Registered electors		35,253		
Majority		1,281	4.96	▼31.02
DAP gain from BN		Swing		?
Source(s) "KEPUTUSAN PILIHAN RAYA UMUM DEWAN UNDANGAN NEGERI PERAK BAGI TAHUN 2008".

Johor state election, 2004
Party	Candidate	Votes	%	∆%
BN	Gan Ping Sieu	17,186	67.99	▼2.45
DAP	Ng Lam Hua	8,091	32.01	▲2.45
Total valid votes		25,277	97.33	
Total rejected ballots		592	2.28	
Unreturned ballots		101	0.39	
Turnout		25,970	74.81	▲3.73
Registered electors		34,714		
Majority		9,095	35.98	▼4.90
BN hold		Swing		
Source(s) "KEPUTUSAN PILIHAN RAYA UMUM DEWAN UNDANGAN NEGERI PERAK BAGI TAHUN 2004".

Johor state election, 1999
Party	Candidate	Votes	%	∆%
BN	Ng Kim Lai	13,241	70.44	▼3.96
DAP	Teo Chue Koon	5,556	29.56	▲3.96
Total valid votes		18,797	97.09	
Total rejected ballots		504	2.60	
Unreturned ballots		60	0.31	
Turnout		19,361	71.08	▼0.63
Registered electors		27,240		
Majority		7,685	40.88	▼7.92
BN hold		Swing		
Source(s) "KEPUTUSAN PILIHAN RAYA UMUM DEWAN UNDANGAN NEGERI PERAK BAGI TAHUN 1999".

Johor state election, 1995
Party	Candidate	Votes	%
BN	Ng Kim Lai	13,172	74.40
DAP	Tok Kim Hua	4,533	25.60
Total valid votes		17,705	96.70
Total rejected ballots		532	2.91
Unreturned ballots		73	0.40
Turnout		18,310	71.71
Registered electors		25,534	
Majority		8,639	48.80
This was a new constituency created.
Source(s) "KEPUTUSAN PILIHAN RAYA UMUM DEWAN UNDANGAN NEGERI PERAK BAGI TAHUN 1995".
