= Marina Ibrahim =

Malaysian politician

- مارينا ابراهيم

Member of the Johor State Legislative Assembly for Skudai
- In office 12 March 2022 – 11 July 2026
- Preceded by: Tan Hong Pin (PH–DAP)
- Majority: 13,943 (2022)

Personal details
- Born: Marina binti Ibrahim; 3 October 1987 (age 38) Kluang, Johor, Malaysia
- Citizenship: Malaysian
- Party: Democratic Action Party (DAP) (since 2016)
- Other political affiliations: Pakatan Harapan (PH) (since 2016)
- Education: Open University Malaysia
- Occupation: Politician

Marina Ibrahim is a former Malaysian politician who served as a Member of the Johor State Legislative Assembly (MLA) for Skudai from March 2022 to July 2026. She was a member of the Johor committee of the Democratic Action Party (DAP), a component party of the Pakatan Harapan (PH) coalition.

On 31 May 2026, Marina announced her decision not to contest in the 2026 Johor state election. She decided to quit politics after citing severe disillusionment and hypocrisy amongst a senior party member of the DAP, when he privately expressed his support for former Prime Minister Najib Razak's house arrest bid.

== Election results ==
Johor State Legislative Assembly
Year	Constituency	Candidate	Votes	Pct.	Opponent(s)	Votes	Pct.	Ballots cast	Majority	Turnout
2022	N48 Skudai	Marina Ibrahim (DAP)	26,359	58.53%	Lim Soon Hai (MCA)	12,416	27.57%	46,144	13,943	44.87%
2022	N48 Skudai	Marina Ibrahim (DAP)	26,359	58.53%	Khoo Kong Ek (GERAKAN)	6,258	13.90%	46,144	13,943	44.87%
