= Nicole Wong Siaw Ting =

Malaysian politician

Yang Berbahagia Datuk Nicole Wong Siaw Ting DPSM

Senator Appointed by the Yang di-Pertuan Agong
- In office 17 June 2022 – 28 October 2022
- Monarch: Abdullah
- Prime Minister: Ismail Sabri Yaakob

Youth Chief of the Malaysian Chinese Association
- In office 4 November 2018 – 23 September 2023
- President: Wee Ka Siong
- Preceded by: Chong Sin Woon
- Succeeded by: Ling Tian Soon

Personal details
- Born: Nicole Wong Siaw Ting; 9 August 1980 (age 46) Bukit Mertajam, Penang, Malaysia
- Party: Malaysian Chinese Association (MCA)
- Spouse: Alan Kok Kwong Yoong (郭光荣)
- Children: 3
- Education: Universiti Tun Abdul Razak; Tsinghua University
- Occupation: Politician

Nicole Wong Siaw Ting

Chinese name
- Traditional Chinese: 王曉庭
- Hanyu Pinyin: Wáng Xiǎotíng
- Jyutping: Wong4 Hiu2 Ting4
- Hokkien POJ: Ông Hiáu-têng

Nicole Wong Siaw Ting (Chinese: 王曉庭; pinyin: Wáng Xiǎotíng; Jyutping: Wong4 Hiu2 Ting4; Pe̍h-ōe-jī: Ông Hiáu-têng; born 9 August 1980) is a Malaysian politician who served as a Senator from June to October 2022. She is a member of the Malaysian Chinese Association (MCA), a component party of the Barisan Nasional (BN) coalition. She also served as the Youth Chief of MCA from November 2018 to September 2023. She is the first female National Youth Chief of MCA in the history of the MCA. Established in 1955, MCA Youth Wing originally comprised all male members until it opened its membership to females in 2013.

== Biography ==
Wong was born in Bukit Mertajam, Pulau Pinang and growing up in Kulim, Kedah to parents of subcontractors in the construction industry. She studied at Chio Min primary and secondary schools. She further her Diploma in Tourism Management at Reliance College KL and obtained her Master of Business Administration (Leadership) at Universiti Tun Abdul Razak. She later completed an International Master of Public Administration for Future Leaders with Tsinghua University. Married to Alan Kok Kwong Yoong(郭光荣), Wong is a mother of 3 children.

== Political career ==
Under the influence of her late father, who was a MCA lifetime member, Wong became a member of MCA in 2001. She started her political career as acting director of the Youth Bureau of MCA women’s wing from 2008 – 2013. Meanwhile, she worked as a personal assistant to the former Deputy of Minister of Information, Communication, and Culture in 2009. She then assisted the Ministry of Education in 2017.

Apart from holding positions in MCA, she has been appointed as a board member and director for the Human Resources Development Corporation (HRD Corp) under the Ministry of Human Resources. She was also a City Advisory board member of Kuala Lumpur City Hall, which is part of the Ministry of Federal Territories. At present, she holds the position of Chief Advisor at Southeast Asia Research Centre for Humanities and serves as board member of Fourth Council of Tsinghua Alumni Association SPPM Branch.

Wong contested in Seputeh during the 13th Malaysian General Election but was defeated by Teresa Kok, incumbent member of parliament of Seputeh from Democratic Action Party (DAP). She contested again for the Tebrau parliamentary seat in the 15th Malaysian General Election but lost the seat to Jimmy Puah Wee Tse, member of People's Justice Party (PKR).

== Election results ==
Parliament of Malaysia
Year	Constituency	Candidate	Votes	Pct	Opponent(s)	Votes	Pct	Ballots cast	Majority	Turnout
2013	P122 Seputeh	Nicole Wong Siaw Ting (MCA)	9,948	13.92%	Teresa Kok Suh Sim (DAP)	61,500	86.08%	71,859	51,552	83.58%
2022	P158 Tebrau	Nicole Wong Siaw Ting (MCA)	30,767	18.32%	Jimmy Puah Wee Tse (PKR)	83,959	49.99%	167,965	30,720	75.22%
2022	P158 Tebrau	Nicole Wong Siaw Ting (MCA)	30,767	18.32%	Mohamad Isa Mohamad Basir (BERSATU)	53,239	31.70%	167,965	30,720	75.22%

== Honours ==
- Malacca :
  - Companion Class II of the Exalted Order of Malacca (DPSM) – Datuk (2020)

== See also ==
- Members of the Dewan Negara, 14th Malaysian Parliament
- Women in the Dewan Negara
