= Kahang (state constituency) =

Political subdivision in Johor, Malaysia

Kahang (N31)
Johor constituency

State constituency
- Legislature: Johor State Legislative Assembly
MLA
Rugendren Velleyan
BN
- Constituency created: 2003
- First contested: 2004
- Last contested: 2026

Demographics
- Population (2020): 31,214
- Electors (2026): 29,814
- Area (km²): 937

Kahang is a state constituency in Johor, Malaysia, that is represented in the Johor State Legislative Assembly.

The state constituency was first contested in 2004 and is mandated to return a single Assemblyman to the Johor State Legislative Assembly under the first-past-the-post voting system.

== Demographics ==
As of 2020, Kahang has a population of 31,214 people.

Ethnic breakdown of Kahang's electorate as of 2026
1. Malay (74.2%)
2. Chinese (19.9%)
3. Indian (3.20%)
4. Other ethnicities (2.70%)

== History ==
=== Polling districts ===
According to the gazette issued on 2 July 2026, the Kahang constituency has a total of 10 polling districts.

State constituency	Polling districts	Code	Location
Kahang（N31）	Kangkar Kahang Timor	153/31/01	SJK (C) Kahang
Kahang（N31）	Kangkar Kahang Barat	153/30/02	SA Kampung Contoh
Kahang（N31）	Kahang	153/31/03	SK Kahang; SK Seri Sedohok
Kahang（N31）	FELDA Kahang Timor	153/31/04	SK (FELDA) Kahang Timur
Kahang（N31）	FELDA Ulu Dengar	153/31/05	SK LKTP Ulu Dengar
Kahang（N31）	Sri Lambak	153/31/06	SA Taman Sri Lambak; SK Bandar T6
Kahang（N31）	Sungai Sayong	154/31/07	SJK (C) Sayong
Kahang（N31）	FELDA Bukit Tongkat	153/31/08	SMK LKTP Belitong
Kahang（N31）	FELDA Ulu Belitong	153/31/09	SK LKTP Belitong
Kahang（N31）	FELDA Ulu Pengeli	153/31/10	SK (FELDA) Ulu Pengeli

=== Representation history ===
Members of the Legislative Assembly for Kahang
Assembly	No	Years	Member	Party
Constituency created by Tenggaroh and Gunung Lambak
11th	N31	2004–2008	Ramis Subramaniam (ரமீஸ் சுப்ரமணியம்)	BN (MIC)
12th	N31	2008–2013	Vidyananthan Ramanadhan (வித்யானந்தன் ராமநாதன்)	BN (MIC)
13th	N31	2013–2018	Vidyananthan Ramanadhan (வித்யானந்தன் ராமநாதன்)	BN (MIC)
14th	N31	2018–2022	Vidyananthan Ramanadhan (வித்யானந்தன் ராமநாதன்)	BN (MIC)
15th	N31	2022–2026	Vidyananthan Ramanadhan (வித்யானந்தன் ராமநாதன்)	BN (MIC)
16th	N31	2026-present	Rugendren Velleyan	BN (MIC)

== Election results ==
Johor state election, 2026
Party	Candidate	Votes	%	∆%
BN	Rugendren Vellayan	15,037	71.74	▲9.05
PH	Mohd Sabri Abd Kadir	3,226	15.23	▲2.20
PN	Mazlan Bujang	2,725	13.03	▼9.61
Total valid votes		21,260	100.00	
Total rejected ballots		243		
Unreturned ballots		18		
Turnout		21,521	72.18	▲13.27
Registered electors		29,814		
Majority		12,013	56.51	▲16.46
BN hold		Swing		?

Johor state election, 2022
Party	Candidate	Votes	%	∆%
BN	R Vidyananthan	10,486	62.69	▲5.03
PN	Daud Yusof	3,788	22.64	▲22.64
PH	Rohani Banu	2,181	13.03	▲13.03
PEJUANG	Rosdi Amir	273	1.63	▲1.63
Total valid votes		16,728	100.00	
Total rejected ballots		465		
Unreturned ballots		95		
Turnout		17,288	58.92	▼25.22
Registered electors		29,343		
Majority		6,698	40.05	▲24.73
BN hold		Swing		

Johor state election, 2018
Party	Candidate	Votes	%	∆%
BN	R Vidyananthan	10,768	57.66	▼11.74
PKR	Noorlihan Ariffin	7,907	42.34	▲11.74
Total valid votes		18,675	100.00	
Total rejected ballots		375		
Unreturned ballots		82		
Turnout		19,132	84.14	▼3.73
Registered electors		22,738		
Majority		2,861	15.32	▼23.47
BN hold		Swing		

Johor state election, 2013
Party	Candidate	Votes	%	∆%
BN	R Vidyananthan	13,955	69.40	▼0.74
PKR	Hamdan Basiran	6,154	30.60	▲0.74
Total valid votes		20,109	100.00	
Total rejected ballots		386		
Unreturned ballots		37		
Turnout		20,532	87.87	▲8.04
Registered electors		23,366		
Majority		7,801	38.79	▼1.48
BN hold		Swing		

Johor state election, 2008
Party	Candidate	Votes	%	∆%
BN	R Vidyananthan	9,272	70.14	▼12.14
PKR	Abdul Halim Mohamad Dawam	3,948	29.86	▲29.86
Total valid votes		13,220	100.00	
Total rejected ballots		386		
Unreturned ballots		42		
Turnout		13,648	79.83	▲1.09
Registered electors		17,097		
Majority		5,324	40.27	▼24.28
BN hold		Swing		

Johor state election, 2004
Party	Candidate	Votes	%
BN	Ramis Subramaniam	9,397	82.28
PAS	Mohamad Esa Jaafar	2,024	17.72
Total valid votes		11,421	100.00
Total rejected ballots		296	
Unreturned ballots		12	
Turnout		11,729	78.74
Registered electors		14,896	
Majority		7,373	64.56
This was a new constituency created.
