= Ayer Hitam (federal constituency) =

Federal constituency in Johor, Malaysia

Ayer Hitam (P148)
Johor constituency

Federal constituency
- Legislature: Dewan Rakyat
- MP: Wee Ka Siong; BN
- Constituency created: 1974
- Constituency abolished: 1986
- Constituency re-created: 2003
- First contested: 1974
- Last contested: 2022

Demographics
- Population (2020): 71,785
- Electors (2026): 62,776
- Area (km²): 747
- Pop. density (per km²): 96.1

Ayer Hitam is a federal constituency in Batu Pahat District, Johor, Malaysia, that has been represented in the Dewan Rakyat from 1974 to 1986, from 2004 to present.

The federal constituency was created in the 1974 redistribution and is mandated to return a single member to the Dewan Rakyat under the first past the post voting system.

== Demographics ==
Ethnic breakdown of Ayer Hitam's electorate as of 2026
1. Malay (58.4%)
2. Chinese (36.2%)
3. Indian (4.10%)
4. Other ethnicities (1.30%)

As of 2020, Ayer Hitam has a population of 34,029 people.

Age breakdown of Ayer Hitam's electorate as of 2022
1. 18-20 (6.30%)
2. 21-29 (21.1%)
3. 30-39 (20.9%)
4. 40-49 (17.1%)
5. 50-59 (15.5%)
6. 60-69 (11.1%)
7. 70-79 (5.48%)
8. 80-89 (2.14%)
9. above 90 (0.34%)
Gender breakdown of Ayer Hitam's electorate as of 2022
1. Male (49.9%)
2. Female (50.1%)

== History ==
It was abolished in 1986 when it was redistributed. It was re-created in 2003.

=== Polling districts ===
According to the gazette issued on 2 July 2026, the Ayer Hitam constituency has a total of 27 polling districts.

State constituency	Polling Districts	Code	Location
Yong Peng (N19)	Sri Sepakat	148/19/01	SK Sepakat Jaya
Yong Peng (N19)	Lam Lee	148/19/02	SJK (C) Lam Lee
Yong Peng (N19)	Ladang Chaah	148/19/03	Dewan Orang Ramai Kampung Hj Kamisan
Yong Peng (N19)	Ladang Yong Peng Bhg. 'B'	148/19/04	SJK (T) Ladang Yong Peng
Yong Peng (N19)	Kangkar Bahru	148/19/05	SJK (C) Kangkar Bahru
Yong Peng (N19)	Yong Peng Utara	148/19/06	SK Taman Seri Kota; SA Taman Kota; Pusat Komuniti Kospen Kg Temehil; SMK Yong Peng
Yong Peng (N19)	Bandar Yong Peng Utara	148/19/07	SK Seri Bertam
Yong Peng (N19)	Bandar Yong Peng Tengah	148/19/08	SJK (C) Yong Peng (1)
Yong Peng (N19)	Bandar Yong Peng Selatan	148/19/09	SK Yong Peng
Yong Peng (N19)	Yong Peng Selatan	148/19/10	SK Seri Yong Peng; SMK Dato Seth
Yong Peng (N19)	Ladang Yong Peng	148/19/11	SK Ladang Yong Peng
Yong Peng (N19)	Kampong Manong	148/19/12	SJK (C) Sri Lalang
Yong Peng (N19)	Taman Jelita	148/19/13	SJK (C) Yong Peng (1)
Semarang (N20)	Parit Haji Yusof	148/20/01	SK Seri Tengah; SK Seri Mendapat
Semarang (N20)	Sri Mendapat	148/20/02	SK Seri Mendapat
Semarang (N20)	Kampong Haji Ghaffar	148/20/03	SK Seri Bulan
Semarang (N20)	Asam Bubok	148/20/04	SK Seri Bandan
Semarang (N20)	Sungai Rambot	148/20/05	SK Seri Manggis
Semarang (N20)	Ayer Hitam Selatan	148/20/06	SK Kota Dalam
Semarang (N20)	Ayer Hitam Utara	148/20/07	SK Ayer Hitam
Semarang (N20)	Bandar Ayer Hitam Barat	148/20/08	SMK Datuk Menteri
Semarang (N20)	Bandar Ayer Hitam Timor	148/20/09	SJK (C) Malayan
Semarang (N20)	Parit Semarang	148/20/10	SMK Suria Perdana
Semarang (N20)	Parit Quarry	148/20/11	SK Bukit Kuari
Semarang (N20)	Sabak Uni	148/20/12	SK Seri Sabak Uni
Semarang (N20)	Parit Haji Ali	148/20/13	SK Setia Jaya
Semarang (N20)	Parit Simpang Tengah	148/20/14	SK Seri Kemajuan

=== Representation history ===
Members of Parliament for Ayer Hitam
Parliament	No	Years	Member	Party	Vote Share
Constituency created from Batu Pahat Dalam, Muar Selatan, Kluang Utara and Segamat Selatan
4th	P105	1974–1978	Hee Tien Lai (许天来)	BN (MCA)	Uncontested
5th	P105	1978–1982	Hee Tien Lai (许天来)	BN (MCA)	20,885; 88.68%
6th	P105	1982–1986	Hee Tien Lai (许天来)	BN (MCA)	21,737; 78.13%
Constituency abolished, merged into Parit Sulong, Sri Gading, Kluang and Sungai Benut
Constituency re-created from Parit Sulong and Sri Gading
11th	P148	2004–2008	Wee Ka Siong (魏家祥)	BN (MCA)	20,065; 82.34%
12th	P148	2008–2013	Wee Ka Siong (魏家祥)	BN (MCA)	20,230; 76.19%
13th	P148	2013–2018	Wee Ka Siong (魏家祥)	BN (MCA)	22,045; 59.94%
14th	P148	2018–2022	Wee Ka Siong (魏家祥)	BN (MCA)	17,076; 43.98%
15th	P148	2022–present	Wee Ka Siong (魏家祥)	BN (MCA)	18,911; 40.50%

=== State constituency ===
Parliamentary constituency	State constituency						
Parliamentary constituency	1954–59*	1959–1974	1974–1986	1986–1995	1995–2004	2004–2018	2018–present
Ayer Hitam						Semarang	
Ayer Hitam			Sri Lalang				
Ayer Hitam			Sri Medan				
Ayer Hitam						Yong Peng	

=== Historical boundaries ===
State Constituency	Area		
State Constituency	1974	2003	2018
Semarang		Ayer Hitam; Kampung Seri Mendapat; Parit Quary; Parit Semarang; Sabak Uni	
Sri Lalang	Ayer Hitam; Chamek; Kampung Sin Lik; Sri Lalang; Yong Peng		
Sri Medan	Kangkar Bahru; Kangkar Senangar; Lam Lee; Parit Sulong; Seri Medan		
Yong Peng		Kampung Sin Lik; Kangkar Bahru; Lam Lee; Taman Bukit Tropika; Yong Peng	

=== Current state assembly members ===
No.	State Constituency	Member	Coalition (Party)
N19	Yong Peng	Ling Tian Soon	BN (MCA)
N20	Semarang	Samsolbari Jamali	BN (UMNO)

=== Local governments and postcodes ===
No.	State Constituency	Local Government	Postcode
N19	Yong Peng	Yong Peng District Council	83700 Yong Peng; 85400 Chaah; 86000 Kluang; 86100 Ayer Hitam; 86200 Simpang Renggam; 86400 Parit Raja
N20	Semarang	Batu Pahat Municipal Council (Sabak Uni and Parit Quarry areas); Yong Peng District Council	83700 Yong Peng; 85400 Chaah; 86000 Kluang; 86100 Ayer Hitam; 86200 Simpang Renggam; 86400 Parit Raja

== Election results ==
Malaysian general election, 2022
Party	Candidate	Votes	%	∆%
BN	Wee Ka Siong	18,911	40.50	▼3.48
PH	Sheikh Umar Bagharib Ali	15,948	34.16	▲34.16
PN	Muhammad Syafiq A Aziz	11,833	25.34	▲25.34
Total valid votes		46,692	100.00	
Total rejected ballots		361		
Unreturned ballots		119		
Turnout		47,172	76.49	▼9.03
Registered electors		61,041		
Majority		2,963	6.34	▲5.56
BN hold		Swing		
Source(s) https://lom.agc.gov.my/ilims/upload/portal/akta/outputp/1753254/PUB%20617%20PARLIMEN%20JOHOR.pdf

Malaysian general election, 2018
Party	Candidate	Votes	%	∆%
BN	Wee Ka Siong	17,076	43.98	▼15.96
PKR	Liew Chin Tong	16,773	43.20	▲43.20
PAS	Mardi Marwan	4,975	12.82	▼27.24
Total valid votes		38,824	100.00	
Total rejected ballots		556		
Unreturned ballots		94		
Turnout		39,474	85.52	▼2.66
Registered electors		46,157		
Majority		303	0.78	▼19.10
BN hold		Swing		
Source(s) "His Majesty's Government Gazette - Notice of Contested Election, Parliament for the State of Johore [P.U. (B) 244/2018]" (PDF). Attorney General's Chambers of Malaysia. 3 May 2018. Archived from the original (PDF) on 29 December 2019. "Federal Government Gazette - Results of Contested Election and Statements of the Poll after the Official Addition of Votes, Parliamentary Constituencies for the State of Johore [P.U. (B) 318/2018]" (PDF). Attorney General's Chambers of Malaysia. 28 May 2018.

Malaysian general election, 2013
Party	Candidate	Votes	%	∆%
BN	Wee Ka Siong	22,045	59.94	▼16.25
PAS	Hu Pang Chaw	14,735	40.06	▲16.25
Total valid votes		36,780	100.00	
Total rejected ballots		967		
Unreturned ballots		94		
Turnout		37,841	88.18	▲9.20
Registered electors		42,913		
Majority		7,310	19.88	▼32.50
BN hold		Swing		
Source(s) "Federal Government Gazette - Notice of Contested Election, Parliament for the State of Johore [P.U. (B) 181/2013]" (PDF). Attorney General's Chambers of Malaysia. 26 April 2013. "Federal Government Gazette - Results of Contested Election and Statements of the Poll after the Official Addition of Votes, Parliamentary Constituencies for the State of Johore [P.U. (B) 222/2013]" (PDF). Attorney General's Chambers of Malaysia. 22 May 2013.

Malaysian general election, 2008
Party	Candidate	Votes	%	∆%
BN	Wee Ka Siong	20,230	76.19	▼6.15
PAS	Husin Sujak	6,321	23.81	▲6.15
Total valid votes		26,551	100.00	
Total rejected ballots		907		
Unreturned ballots		30		
Turnout		27,488	78.98	▲2.11
Registered electors		34,805		
Majority		13,909	52.38	▼12.30
BN hold		Swing		

Malaysian general election, 2004
Party	Candidate	Votes	%	∆%
BN	Wee Ka Siong	20,065	82.34	
PAS	Mohd Zamri Md Taksis	4,302	17.66	
Total valid votes		24,367	100.00	
Total rejected ballots		851		
Unreturned ballots		0		
Turnout		25,218	76.87	
Registered electors		32,806		
Majority		15,763	64.68	
BN hold		Swing		

Malaysian general election, 1982
Party	Candidate	Votes	%	∆%
BN	Hee Tien Lai	21,737	78.13	▼10.55
DAP	Chan Yeik Nong	6,085	21.87	▲21.87
Total valid votes		27,822	100.00	
Total rejected ballots		1,115		
Unreturned ballots		0		
Turnout		28,937	76.60	▼1.23
Registered electors		37,778		
Majority		15,652	56.26	▼21.10
BN hold		Swing		

Malaysian general election, 1978
Party	Candidate	Votes	%	∆%
BN	Hee Tien Lai	20,885	88.68	▲88.68
PAS	Jaini Salleh	2,666	11.32	▲11.32
Total valid votes		23,551	100.00	
Total rejected ballots		773		
Unreturned ballots		0		
Turnout		24,324	77.83	
Registered electors		31,251		
Majority		18,189	77.36	
BN hold		Swing		

Malaysian general election, 1974
Party	Candidate	Votes	%
On the nomination day, Hee Tien Lai won uncontested.
BN	Hee Tien Lai		
Total valid votes			100.00
Total rejected ballots			
Unreturned ballots			
Turnout			
Registered electors		24,845	
Majority			
This was a new constituency created.
