= Ling Tian Soon =

Malaysian politician

Yang Berhormat Tuan Sdr Ling Tian Soon MLA
- 林添顺

Member of the Johor State Executive Council
- Incumbent
- Assumed office 13 February 2024 (Health & Environment)
- Monarch: Ibrahim Iskandar
- Menteri Besar: Onn Hafiz Ghazi
- Preceded by: Himself (Health); Raven Kumar Krishnasamy (Environment)
- Constituency: Yong Peng
- In office 26 March 2022 – 13 February 2024 (Health & Unity)
- Monarch: Ibrahim Iskandar
- Menteri Besar: Onn Hafiz Ghazi
- Preceded by: Vidyananthan Ramanadhan (Health); Chong Fat Full (Unity)
- Succeeded by: Himself (Health); Raven Kumar Krishnasamy (Unity)
- Constituency: Yong Peng

Member of the Johor State Legislative Assembly for Yong Peng
- Incumbent
- Assumed office 12 March 2022
- Preceded by: Chew Peck Choo (PH–DAP)
- Majority: 2,741 (2022); 4,603 (2026)

Youth Chief of the Malaysian Chinese Association
- Incumbent
- Assumed office 23 September 2023
- President: Wee Ka Siong
- Deputy: Mike Chong Yew Chuan
- Preceded by: Nicole Wong Siaw Ting

Faction represented in Johor State Legislative Assembly
- 2022–: Barisan Nasional

Personal details
- Born: Ling Tian Soon; 13 January 1984 (age 42) Batu Pahat, Johor, Malaysia
- Citizenship: Malaysian
- Party: Malaysian Chinese Association (MCA)
- Other political affiliations: Barisan Nasional (BN)
- Occupation: Politician

Ling Tian Soon (Chinese: 林添顺; pinyin: Lín Tiānshùn; Foochow Romanized: Lìng Tiĕng-Sông; born on 13 January 1984), or commonly known as Ah Soon, is a Malaysian politician who has served as Member of the Johor State Executive Council (EXCO) in the Barisan Nasional (BN) state administration under Menteri Besar Onn Hafiz Ghazi and Member of the Johor State Legislative Assembly (MLA) for Yong Peng since March 2022. He is a member of the Malaysian Chinese Association (MCA), a component party of the BN coalition. He has also served as the Youth Chief of MCA since September 2023. He is also the Organising Secretary of MCA, Youth Chief of MCA of Johor, Division Chief of Ayer Hitam of MCA. He is one of the only two Johor EXCO members of Chinese ethnicity and of MCA alongside Lee Ting Han.

== Election results ==
Johor State Legislative Assembly
Year	Constituency	Candidate	Votes	Pct	Opponent(s)	Votes	Pct	Ballots cast	Majority	Turnout
2018	N19 Yong Peng	Ling Tian Soon (MCA)	7,218	34.76%	Chew Peck Choo (DAP)	12,307	59.26%	20,768	5,089	83.40%
2018	N19 Yong Peng	Ling Tian Soon (MCA)	7,218	34.76%	Muhammad Abdullah (PAS)	1,243	5.99%	20,768	5,089	83.40%
2022	N19 Yong Peng	Ling Tian Soon (MCA)	9,870	52.84%	Alan Tee Boon Tsong (DAP)	7,129	38.16%	18,680	2,741	56.52%
2022	N19 Yong Peng	Ling Tian Soon (MCA)	9,870	52.84%	Susan Yong Hui Ling (GERAKAN)	1,681	9.00%	18,680	2,741	56.52%
2026	N19 Yong Peng	Ling Tian Soon (MCA)	13,630	60.16%	Yong Hui Yi (DAP)	9,027	39.84%	22,657	4,603	67.38%

== Honours ==
=== Honours of Malaysia ===
- Johor
  - Second Class of the Sultan Ibrahim of Johor Medal (PSI II) (2026)
