= Krishnasamy Shiman =

Malaysian politician

Yang Berbahagia Datuk Krishnasamy Shiman PJN KMN AMN

Member of the Johor State Legislative Assembly for Tenggaroh
- In office 25 April 1995 – 11 January 2008
- Preceded by: Singgatore Achotan
- Succeeded by: Murukasvary Thanarajan

Personal details
- Born: 5 October 1946 Tangkak, Johor, Federation of Malaya
- Died: 11 January 2008 (aged 61) Johor State MIC Building
- Party: Malaysian Indian Congress (MIC) (–2008)
- Other political affiliations: Barisan Nasional (BN) (–2008)
- Spouse: N. Sornavalli
- Children: 3 (include Raven Kumar Krishnasamy)
- Occupation: Politician

Krishnasamy s/o Shiman (Tamil: ஷி. கிருஷ்ணசாமி) (5 October 1946 – 11 January 2008) was a state assemblyman for the Tenggaroh constituency from 1995 to 2008, belonging to the Malaysian Indian Congress (MIC). His assassination sparked grave security concerns among politicians.

== Career ==
Before venturing into politics, he was a contractor. Then, after 1995, he ventured into politics and left his career as a contractor.

Beliau berkahwin dengan Datin N. Sornavalli dan mendapat empat orang anak iaitu Rani, Raj Kumar, Rathika dan Raven Kumar.

== Political career ==
He entered politics in 1995. He contested on the Barisan Nasional ticket, and won in the Tenggaroh state constituency. Krishnasamy was the most outspoken politician on youth programmes in the party and in Johor.

In the 2004 Malaysian General Election, Krishnasamy contested in Tenggaroh for the third time and won. He defeated PAS candidate Sheikh Abdullah Said Salleh with a majority of 8,281 votes. Krishnasamy won 10,412 votes and Shekh Abdullah 2,125 votes.

== Death ==
On 11 January 2008 at 2.30pm, as he was entering the lift at the Johor MIC Building on Jalan Segget. He was shot dead in the head.

== Election results ==
Johor State Legislative Assembly
Year	Constituency	Candidate	Votes	Pct	Opponent(s)	Votes	Pct	Ballots cast	Majority	Turnout
1995	N10 Tenggaroh	Krishnasamy Shiman (MIC)								
1999	N10 Tenggaroh	Krishnasamy Shiman (MIC)	11,071	73.85%	Terng Liok Seng (keADILan)	3,920	26.15%	15,680	7,151	70.15%
2004	N33 Tenggaroh	Krishnasamy Shiman (MIC)	10,412	83.05%	Sheikh Abdullah Said Salleh (PAS)	2,125	16.95%	12,833	8,287	75.28%

== Honours ==
- Malaysia
  - Commander of the Order of Meritorious Service (PJN) – Datuk (2003)
  - Officer of the Order of the Defender of the Realm (KMN) (1999)
  - Member of the Order of the Defender of the Realm (AMN) (1991)

== See also ==
- Politics of Malaysia
