= Ng Sze Han =

Malaysian politician and engineer

Yang Berhormat Tuan Ng Sze Han MLA
- 黄思汉
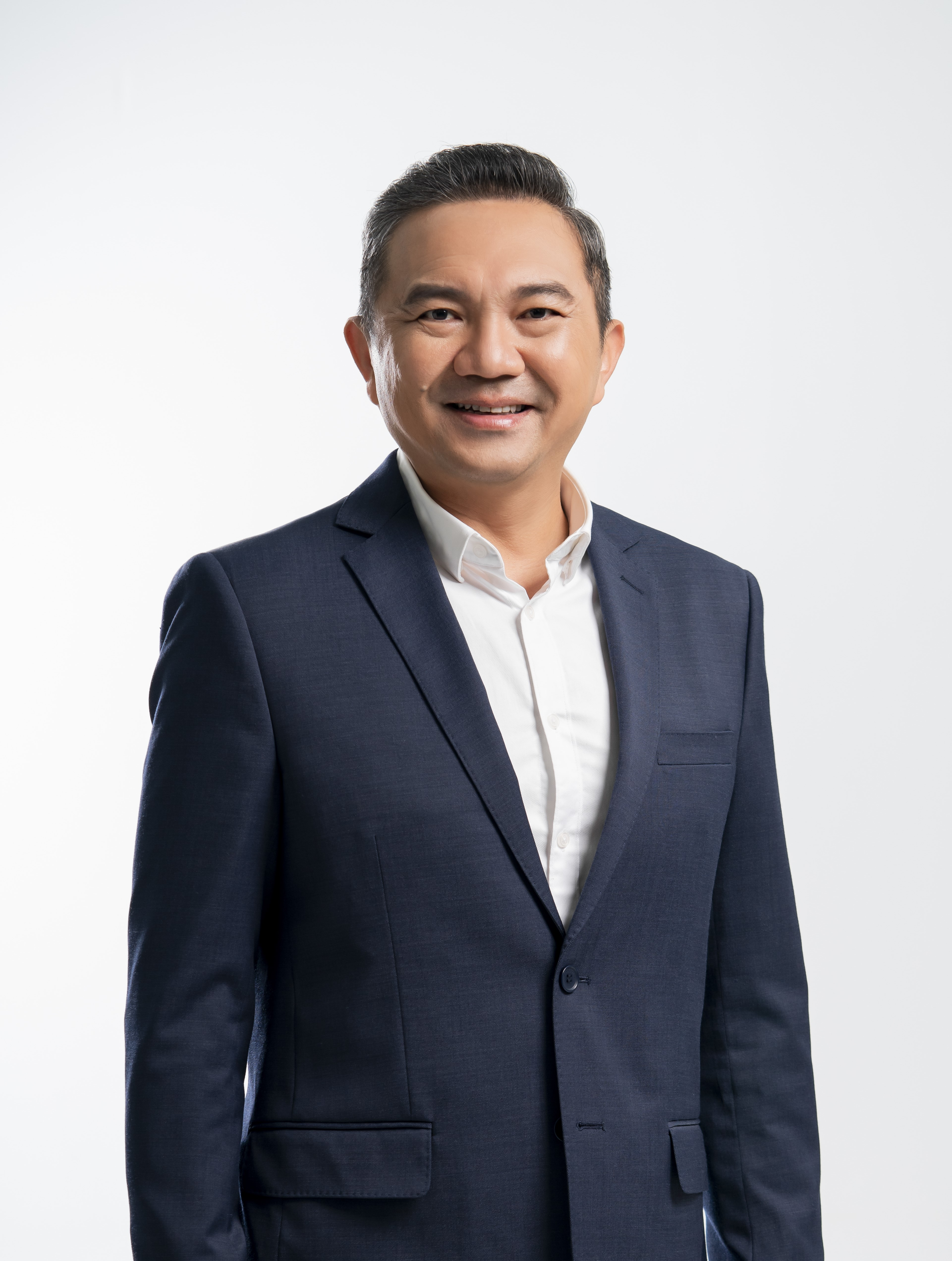

Member of the Selangor State Executive Council (Local Government, Public Transport and New Village Development : 14 May 2018 – 21 August 2023) & (Investment, Trade, and Mobility : since 21 August 2023)
- Incumbent
- Assumed office 21 August 2023
- Monarch: Sharafuddin
- Menteri Besar: Amirudin Shari
- Preceded by: Teng Chang Khim
- Constituency: Kinrara
- In office 14 May 2018 – 21 August 2023
- Monarch: Sharafuddin
- Menteri Besar: Azmin Ali (14 May–19 June 2018); Amirudin Shari (2018–2023)
- Preceded by: Teng Chang Khim (Local Government and Public Transport); Ean Yong Hian Wah (New Village Development)
- Succeeded by: Ng Suee Lim (Local Government Development, New Village Development); Himself (Public Transport)
- Constituency: Kinrara

Assistant National Treasurer of the Democratic Action Party
- Incumbent
- Assumed office 20 March 2022
- Secretary-General: Anthony Loke Siew Fook
- National Treasurer: Fong Kui Lun (2022–2025); Ngeh Koo Ham (since 2025)
- Preceded by: Ngeh Koo Ham

State Chairman of the Democratic Action Party of Selangor
- Incumbent
- Assumed office 10 November 2024
- Deputy: Ganabatirau Veraman
- Secretary-General: Anthony Loke Siew Fook
- Preceded by: Gobind Singh Deo

State Secretary of the Democratic Action Party of Selangor
- In office 14 November 2021 – 10 November 2024
- Assistant: Jamaliah Jamaluddin
- Secretary-General: Lim Guan Eng (2021–2022); Anthony Loke Siew Fook (2022–2024)
- Preceded by: Ronnie Liu Tian Khiew
- Succeeded by: Yeo Bee Yin

Member of the Selangor State Legislative Assembly for Kinrara
- Incumbent
- Assumed office 5 May 2013
- Preceded by: Teresa Kok Suh Sim (PR–DAP)
- Majority: 14,604 (2013); 45,212 (2018); 54,535 (2023)

Faction represented in Selangor State Legislative Assembly
- 2013–2018: Democratic Action Party
- 2018–: Pakatan Harapan

Personal details
- Born: Ng Sze Han; 6 October 1971 (age 55) Batu Pahat, Johor, Malaysia
- Citizenship: Malaysian
- Party: Democratic Action Party (DAP)
- Other political affiliations: Pakatan Rakyat (PR) (2008–2015); Pakatan Harapan (PH) (since 2015)
- Spouse: Lim Bee Eng
- Children: 5
- Education: Trine University
- Occupation: Politician
- Profession: Engineer

Ng Sze Han

Chinese name
- Traditional Chinese: 黃思漢
- Simplified Chinese: 黄思汉
- Hanyu Pinyin: Huáng Sīhàn
- Jyutping: Wong4 Si1 Hon3
- Hokkien POJ: N̂g Si-hàn
- Tâi-lô: N̂g Si-hàn

Ng Sze Han (simplified Chinese: 黄思汉; traditional Chinese: 黃思漢; pinyin: Huáng Sīhàn; Jyutping: Wong4 Si1 Hon3; Pe̍h-ōe-jī: N̂g Si-hàn; Tâi-lô: N̂g Si-hàn; born 6 October 1971) is a Malaysian politician and engineer who has served as Member of the Selangor State Executive Council (EXCO) in the Pakatan Harapan (PH) state administration under Menteri Besar Azmin Ali and Amirudin Shari since May 2018 and Member of the Selangor State Legislative Assembly (MLA) for Kinrara since May 2013. He is a member of the Democratic Action Party (DAP), a component party of PH and formerly Pakatan Rakyat (PR) coalitions, he has served as the Assistant National Treasurer of DAP since March 2022 and was promoted to State Chairman of DAP Selangor in November 2024, after serving as State Secretary from November 2021.

== Early life and education ==
Ng Sze Han was born in Batu Pahat, Johor, Malaysia on 6 October 1971. He earned an Engineering degree from Trine University.

== Early career ==
Ng Sze Han served as the Regional Manager for Asia Pacific at Augier S.A.S. from 2001 to 2008.

== Political career ==
=== Early political career ===
From 2008 to 2013, he was a councilor at Majlis Perbandaran Subang Jaya (MPSJ), now known as Majlis Bandaraya Subang Jaya.

During his tenure at MBSJ, he was a member of several committees, including the One Stop Centre (OSC), Finance, Infrastructure & Facilities, and Internal Audit committees.

Since 2023, he has served as a state legislative councillor for Kinrara.

=== Exco Selangor for Local Government, Public Transport and New Village Development (2018 to 2023) ===
Ng Sze Han was appointed to the state executive council, with the portfolios of Local Government, Public Transport and New Village Development since May 2018.

=== Exco Selangor for Investment, Trade and Mobility (since 2023) ===
Ng Sze Han was appointed to the state executive council, with the portfolios of Investment, Trade, and Mobility since May 2023. He is also the chairman of Selangor's Semiconductor Task Force and Data Centre Task Force.

=== Central Executive Committee & Assistant Treasurer of National DAP (since 2022) ===
At the national level, he serves as a member of the Central Executive Committee & Assistant Treasurer of National DAP.

=== State Chairman of DAP Selangor (since 2024) ===
In the 2024 DAP Selangor state party election, Ng Sze Han was appointed as the Chairman of DAP Selangor.

== Achievements of the EXCO for Investment, Trade, and Mobility ==
Since Sze Han took charge of the latest portfolio, Selangor has demonstrated strong economic performance.

=== Selangor recorded the highest approved investments in 2024 ===
In 2024, Selangor led as the top investment destination with RM101.1 billion in approved investments, marked an remarkable increase of 83% in approved investment compared to 2023 (RM55.3 mil).

=== Selangor top contributor to Malaysia's 2025 GDP ===
In 2023, Selangor achieved a historic milestone by contributing 26.5% to Malaysia's GDP. The economic activity in Selangor surged to RM460.1 billion, positioning it as the first state in the country to surpass RM400 billion in economic activity three years in his term. https://www.dosm.gov.my/portal-main/release-content/gross-domestic-product-gdp-by-state-2025

=== Selangor top contributor to Malaysia's approved investments ===
Much of this growth stemmed from Ng's dedication towards bringing in domestic and foreign investments to businesses in the state, leading to a staggering RM 66.8 billion worth of approved investments from January to September 2024, which is RM11 billion more than the RM55 billion target set by the state.

=== Selangor now a high-income state ===
In 2024, Selangor officially achieved high-income status as defined by the World Bank, having surpassed the minimum threshold of US$14,005. The state's gross national income per capita for 2023 was reported at US$14,291.

=== Creating 50,222 Potential Jobs ===
In Selangor, 1,371 projects were approved, consisting of 253 manufacturing projects and 1,116 service-based initiatives. These projects are projected to create 50,222 potential jobs, significantly surpassing the 23,060 jobs associated with the 997 projects approved in the same period the previous year.

=== Southeast Asia's Largest IC Design Park ===
With regards to the semiconductor industry, Malaysia has poised itself to switch from being a purely industrial manufacturer of semiconductors towards designing the front-end of Integrated Circuit (IC) semiconductors in hopes of becoming a high-income/value country.

Ng Sze Han was one of the main proponents in establishing Malaysia's first and Southeast Asia's biggest, IC design park in Puchong, Malaysia. He had successfully attracted investments from two Malaysian diasporas: Dato Ks Phua, the founder of Phison Electronics who resides in Taiwan, and Dr. Salleh, co-founder of Weeroc, a leading French fabless semiconductor manufacturer.

The IC design park successfully launched in August 2024. With the Central Government and Selangor Government, including Sze Han, focusing on establishing another larger IC design park in the near future.

=== Improve first-and-last-mile connectivity ===
Ng Sze Han has significantly contributed to improving the public transportation in Selangor through his “Selangor Mobility” initiative which introduced the DRT (Demand-responsive transport) service in Selangor. The DRT service provides subsidized one-way trips in the form of an easy-on-demand bus service that aims to serve riders in between their first and last mile of a journey within a designated neighbourhood. The DRT service operates in Puchong, Ampang, Bandar Utama, Subang Jaya, Shah Alam, Klang, Serdang and Hulu Kelang.

During the eight-month pilot, the DRT service charged a flat fare of RM2. The Selangor state government considered expanding the service to other areas.

== ADUN Kinrara ==
=== Dapur Kinrara ===
Dapur Kinrara is a community kitchen initiative founded by YB Ng Sze Han. Dapur Kinrara was established in response to the growing need for food assistance in the community. With rising living costs and economic hardship, many families and individuals struggle to afford basic necessities like food. Dapur Kinrara aims to bridge this gap by providing a reliable source of nutritious meals to those in need.

In addition to providing hot meals, Dapur Kinrara also organizes food distribution drives and other community outreach programs. These initiatives aim to reach a wider range of individuals and families in need, ensuring that no one is left behind.

=== Solving the flood problem in Kinrara ===
The flood problem in Kinrara is not taken lightly by YB Mr Ng Sze Han. An investigation has been conducted to identify the cause of the flood and it was found that the Sungai Kuyoh Water Retention Pond has become shallow and small. A discussion was held with YB Federal Territories Minister and Dato Mayor of DBKL. YB Minister finally agreed to carry out and expedite the work. Sungai Kuyoh's bund was also built and the tunnel under the KESAS Highway which was also found to be the cause of the flood was closed. As a result, there is no more flooding in the Kinrara area.

== Election results ==
Selangor State Legislative Assembly
Year	Constituency	Candidate	Votes	Pct	Opponent(s)	Votes	Pct	Ballots cast	Majority	Turnout
2013	N30 Kinrara	Ng Sze Han (DAP)	22,333	74.29%	Wong Hock Aun (MCA)	7,729	25.71%	30,315	14,604	88.60%
2018	N30 Kinrara	Ng Sze Han (DAP)	52,207	82.90%	Chiew Kai Heng (MCA)	6,995	11.11%	63,536	45,212	87.80%
2018	N30 Kinrara	Ng Sze Han (DAP)	52,207	82.90%	Lim Ying Ran (IKATAN)	3,772	5.99%	63,536	45,212	87.80%
2023	N30 Kinrara	Ng Sze Han (DAP)	71,290	80.97%	Wong Yong Kang (BERSATU)	16,755	19.03%	88,452	54,535	71.46%
