= Liew Ah Kim =

Malaysian politician

- 廖金华

Member of the Malaysian Parliament for Seputeh
- In office 3 August 1986 – 29 November 1999
- Preceded by: constituency established
- Succeeded by: Teresa Kok Suh Sim (BA–DAP)
- Majority: 20,993 (1986); 23,008 (1990); 5,615 (1995)

Personal details
- Citizenship: Malaysian
- Party: Democratic Action Party (DAP) (1966–1998; since 2002); Malaysian Democratic Party (MDP) (1998–2002)
- Occupation: Politician

Liew Ah Kim is a Malaysian politician. He was the Member of Parliament for Seputeh from 1986 to 1999 under Democratic Action Party and the Member of Selangor State Legislative Assembly for Kajang from 1978 to 1982.

== Politics ==
He was the Member of Parliament for Seputeh before quitting from DAP in 1998 and established Malaysian Democratic Party together with Wee Choo Keong and was the Deputy Chairman for the party. He tried to defend his seat under the ticket of the new party in 1999 Malaysian general election, but he failed and lost to Teresa Kok. In 2002, he rejoined DAP and contested for the Kampar parliamentary seat but lost to the BN candidate. He had also contested in the 2022 Central Executive Committee Election but was not chosen as a member.

== Election results ==
Negeri Sembilan State Legislative Assembly
Year	Constituency	Candidate	Votes	Pct	Opponent(s)	Votes	Pct	Ballots cast	Majority	Turnout
1969	N06 Sungei Ujong	Liew Ah Kim (DAP)	5,946	56.79%	Lee Boon Peng (MCA)	3,116	29.76%	11,014	2,830	69.12%
1969	N06 Sungei Ujong	Liew Ah Kim (DAP)	5,946	56.79%	Mohd Tahir Abu (PMIP)	1,007	9.62%	11,014	2,830	69.12%
1969	N06 Sungei Ujong	Liew Ah Kim (DAP)	5,946	56.79%	Chin See Yin (UMCO)	402	3.84%	11,014	2,830	69.12%
1974	N11 Sungei Ujong	Liew Ah Kim (DAP)	4,414	53.59%	Wong Chang Yee (MCA)	3,823	46.41%	8,785	591	74.24%

Selangor State Legislative Assembly
Year	Constituency	Candidate	Votes	Pct	Opponent(s)	Votes	Pct	Ballots cast	Majority	Turnout
1978	N17 Kajang	Liew Ah Kim (DAP)	6,841	56.95%	Kan Tong Fong (MCA)	4,313	35.91%	12,374	2,528	78.78%
1978	N17 Kajang	Liew Ah Kim (DAP)	6,841	56.95%	Kampo Radjo Baginda Kayo (PSRM)	550	4.58%	12,374	2,528	78.78%
1978	N17 Kajang	Liew Ah Kim (DAP)	6,841	56.95%	Aman Khan (PEKEMAS)	308	2.56%	12,374	2,528	78.78%

Parliament of Malaysia
Year	Constituency	Candidate	Votes	Pct	Opponent(s)	Votes	Pct	Ballots cast	Majority	Turnout
1982	P058 Batu Gajah	Liew Ah Kim (DAP)	15,686	45.02%	Ban Hon Keong (MCA)	19,156	54.98%	36,010	3,470	75.47%
1986	P101 Seputeh	Liew Ah Kim (DAP)	36,782	69.47%	David Chua Kok Tee (MCA)	15,789	29.82%	52,950	20,993	70.46%
1990	P101 Seputeh	Liew Ah Kim (DAP)	39,445	69.96%	Fu Ah Kiow (MCA)	16,437	29.15%	56,382	23,008	69.06%
1995	P110 Seputeh	Liew Ah Kim (DAP)	26,518	55.27%	Ooi Saw Choo (MCA)	20,903	43.57%	47,975	5,615	70.73%
1995	P110 Seputeh	Liew Ah Kim (DAP)	26,518	55.27%	Liew Choon Teck (IND)	203	0.42%	47,975	5,615	70.73%
1999	P110 Seputeh	Liew Ah Kim (MDP)	457	0.86%	Teresa Kok Suh Sim (DAP)	28,657	54.07%	52,995	5,200	73.58%
1999	P110 Seputeh	Liew Ah Kim (MDP)	457	0.86%	Sua Chong Keh (MCA)	23,457	44.26%	52,995	5,200	73.58%
1999	P110 Seputeh	Liew Ah Kim (MDP)	457	0.86%	Duraichelvan Murugeson (IND)	134	0.25%	52,995	5,200	73.58%
2004	P070 Kampar	Liew Ah Kim (DAP)	13,639	37.09%	Hew See Tong (MCA)	23,129	62.91%	38,413	9,490	63.10%

== See also ==
- Malaysian Democratic Party
- Wee Choo Keong
- Seputeh (federal constituency)
- Kajang (state constituency)
