= Chew Peck Choo =

Malaysian politician

- 周碧珠

Member of the Johor State Legislative Assembly for Yong Peng
- In office 5 May 2013 – 22 January 2022
- Preceded by: Lim Kee Moi
- Succeeded by: Ling Tian Soon

Personal details
- Born: Chew Peck Choo; 16 September 1968 (age 57)
- Citizenship: Malaysian
- Party: Democratic Action Party
- Other political affiliations: Pakatan Rakyat (till 2015); Pakatan Harapan (since 2015)
- Spouse: Soo Kia Huat
- Education: University of Malaya
- Occupation: Politician

Chew Peck Choo

Chinese name
- Traditional Chinese: 周碧珠
- Simplified Chinese: 周碧珠
- Hanyu Pinyin: Zhōu Bìzhū
- Jyutping: Zau1 Bik1 Zyu1
- Hokkien POJ: Chiu Phek-chu
- Tâi-lô: Tsiu Phik-tsu

Chew Peck Choo is a Malaysian politician from Democratic Action Party. She was the Member of Johor State Legislative Assembly for Yong Peng from 2013 to 2022.

== Education ==
She has studied in the Kluang High School and SMK Dato Menteri. She is a Bachelor of Mathematics and Bachelor of Science from University of Malaya.

== Politics ==
In the 2013 Malaysian general election, she won the Yong Peng seat on the ticket of DAP and was able to defend her seat in the 2018 Malaysian general election. She was the Treasurer for DAP Johor from 2004 to 2013. She was also the Women's Chief of DAP Johor from 2013 to 2016, Deputy Women's Chief from 2016 to 2018 and Assistant of Women's Chief from 2018 to 2022.

== Election results ==
Johor State Legislative Assembly
| Year | Constituency | Candidate | Votes | Pct | Opponent(s) | Votes | Pct | Ballots cast | Majority | Turnout |
|---|---|---|---|---|---|---|---|---|---|---|
| 2004 | N19 Yong Peng | Chew Peck Choo (DAP) | 4,265 | 33.14% | Lim Kee Moi (MCA) | 8,112 | 63.04% | 12,869 | 3,847 | 75.28% |
| 2013 | N19 Yong Peng | Chew Peck Choo (DAP) | 10,825 | 55.27% | Lim Kee Moi (MCA) | 8,350 | 42.64% | 19,584 | 2,475 | 87.10% |
| 2018 | N19 Yong Peng | Chew Peck Choo (DAP) | 12,307 | 58.29% | Ling Tian Soon (MCA) | 7,218 | 34.19% | 21,113 | 5,089 | 84.78% |
| 2018 | N19 Yong Peng | Chew Peck Choo (DAP) | 12,307 | 58.29% | Muhammad Abdullah (PAS) | 1,243 | 5.89% | 21,113 | 5,089 | 84.78% |

== Health ==
She had suffered from stroke in 2018 but has recovered completely in 2020.

== Retirement ==
On 22 January 2022, she announced her retirement from politics and will not participate in the 2022 Johor state election.
