= Kinrara (state constituency) =

State constituency in Selangor, Malaysia

Kinrara (N30)
Selangor constituency

State constituency
- Legislature: Selangor State Legislative Assembly
MLA
Ng Sze Han
PH
- Constituency created: 2003
- First contested: 2004
- Last contested: 2023

Demographics
- Electors (2023): 123,782

Kinrara is a state constituency in Selangor, Malaysia, that has been represented in the Selangor State Legislative Assembly since 2004. It has been represented by Ng Sze Han of Pakatan Harapan (PH) and formerly Pakatan Rakyat (PR) since 2013.

The state constituency was created in the 2003 redistribution and is mandated to return a single member to the Selangor State Legislative Assembly under the first past the post voting system.

== Demographics ==
Ethnic breakdown of Kinrara's electorate as of 2023
1. Chinese (53.1%)
2. Malay (25.2%)
3. Indian (19.3%)
4. Other ethnicities (2.35%)

== History ==
=== Polling districts ===
According to the federal gazette issued on 30 March 2018, the Kinrara constituency is divided into 23 polling districts.

State conatituency	Polling Districts	Code	Location
Kinrara（N30）	Kinrara Seksyen 4, 5 & 6	104/31/01	Sekolah KAFA Integrasi An-Najah
Kinrara（N30）	Kinrara Seksyen 2	104/31/02	Balai Masyarakat Taman Kinrara Seksyen 1
Kinrara（N30）	Kinrara Seksyen 1	104/31/03	Dewan Serbaguna Taman Kinrara Seksyen 1
Kinrara（N30）	Kinrara Seksyen 7	104/31/04	SK Bukit Kuchai
Kinrara（N30）	Kinrara Seksyen 3	104/31/05	SMK Batu Lapan Jalan Puchong
Kinrara（N30）	Puchong Jaya Timur	104/31/06	SMK Bandar Puchong Jaya (B)
Kinrara（N30）	Puchong Jaya Utara	104/31/07	SMK Bandar Puchong Jaya (A)
Kinrara（N30）	Puchong Jaya Barat	104/31/08	SK Puchong Jaya
Kinrara（N30）	Batu 12 Puchong	104/31/09	SJK (T) Castlefield
Kinrara（N30）	Batu 7 Jalan Puchong	104/31/10	Pusat Rukun Tetangga Seksyen 2 Taman Kinrara
Kinrara（N30）	Batu 13 Puchong	104/31/11	SK Puchong
Kinrara（N30）	Bandar Kinrara Seksyen 1	104/31/12	SMK Seksyen 1 Bandar Kinrara
Kinrara（N30）	Pusat Bandar Puchong	104/31/13	SK Pusat Bandar Puchong (2)
Kinrara（N30）	Bandar Kinrara Seksyen 2	104/31/14	SK Seksyen 1 Bandar Kinrara
Kinrara（N30）	Bandar Kinrara Seksyen 3	104/31/15	SK Seksyen 2 Bandar Kinrara
Kinrara（N30）	Bandar Kinrara Seksyen 4	104/31/16	SMK Seksyen 3 Bandar Kinrara
Kinrara（N30）	Bandar Kinrara Seksyen 5	104/31/17	SMK Seksyen 4 Bandar Kinrara
Kinrara（N30）	Bandar Puteri	104/31/18	SMK Pusat Bandar Puchong (1)
Kinrara（N30）	Puchong Indah 1	104/31/19	SK Puchong Indah
Kinrara（N30）	Puchong Perdana 1	104/31/20	KAFA Integrasi Madrasatul-Ikhwan
Kinrara（N30）	Puchong Perdana 2	104/31/21	SK Puchong Perdana
Kinrara（N30）	Puchong Indah 2	104/31/22	Balai Masyarakat Taman Puchong Indah
Kinrara（N30）	Puchong Intan	104/31/23	Dewan Orang Ramai Taman Puchong Intan

=== Representation history ===
Members of the Legislative Assembly for Kinrara
Assembly	No	Years	Member	Party
Constituency created from Pucung
11th	N30	2004–2008	Kow Cheong Wei (高祥威)	BN (MCA)
12th	N30	2008–2013	Teresa Kok Suh Sim (郭素沁)	PR (DAP)
13th	N30	2013–2015	Ng Sze Han (黃思汉)	PR (DAP)
13th	N30	2015–2018	Ng Sze Han (黃思汉)	PH (DAP)
14th	N30	2018–2023	Ng Sze Han (黃思汉)	PH (DAP)
15th	N30	2023–present	Ng Sze Han (黃思汉)	PH (DAP)

== Election results ==
Selangor state election, 2023
Party	Candidate	Votes	%	∆%
PH	Ng Sze Han	71,290	80.97	▼1.99
PN	Wong Yong Kang	16,755	19.03	▲19.03
Total valid votes		88,045	100.00	
Total rejected ballots		407		
Unreturned ballots		124		
Turnout		88,576	71.56	▼16.20
Registered electors		123,782		
Majority		54,535	61.94	▼9.90
PH hold		Swing		

Selangor state election, 2018
Party	Candidate	Votes	%	∆%
PKR	Ng Sze Han	52,207	82.96	▲82.96
BN	Chiew Kai Heng	6,995	11.11	▼14.60
PAS	Lim Ying Ran	3,732	5.93	▲5.93
Total valid votes		62,934	100.00	
Total rejected ballots		371		
Unreturned ballots		231		
Turnout		63,536	87.76	▼0.89
Registered electors		72,399		
Majority		45,212	71.84	▲23.26
PKR hold		Swing		

Selangor state election, 2013
Party	Candidate	Votes	%	∆%
DAP	Ng Sze Han	22,333	74.29	▲10.11
BN	Wong Hock Aun	7,729	25.71	▼10.11
Total valid votes		30,062	100.00	
Total rejected ballots		253		
Unreturned ballots		38		
Turnout		30,353	88.65	▲9.33
Registered electors		34,241		
Majority		14,604	48.58	▲20.22
DAP hold		Swing		
Source(s) "Federal Government Gazette - Notice of Contested Election, State Legislative Assembly for the State of Selangor [P.U. (B) 192/2013]" (PDF). Attorney General's Chambers of Malaysia. 26 April 2013. Archived from the original (PDF) on 2019-12-29. "Federal Government Gazette - Results of Contested Election and Statements of the Poll after the Official Addition of Votes, State Constituencies for the State of Selangor [P.U. (B) 233/2013]" (PDF). Attorney General's Chambers of Malaysia. 22 May 2013. Archived from the original (PDF) on 2018-10-02.

Selangor state election, 2008
Party	Candidate	Votes	%	∆%
DAP	Teresa Kok Suh Sim	12,990	64.18	▲29.36
BN	Kow Cheong Wei	7,251	35.82	▼29.36
Total valid votes		20,241	100.00	
Total rejected ballots		255		
Unreturned ballots		21		
Turnout		20,517	79.31	▲76.97
Registered electors		25,868		
Majority		5,739	28.36	▼2.00
DAP gain from BN		Swing		?

Selangor state election, 2004
Party	Candidate	Votes	%
BN	Kow Cheong Wei	9,163	65.18
DAP	Teoh Lib Peng	4,894	34.82
Total valid votes		14,057	100.00
Total rejected ballots		416	
Unreturned ballots		0	
Turnout		14,473	72.34
Registered electors		20,006	
Majority		4,269	30.36
This was a new constituency created.
