= Teresa Kok =

Malaysian politician

Yang Berhormat Puan Teresa Kok Suh Sim MP
- 郭素沁
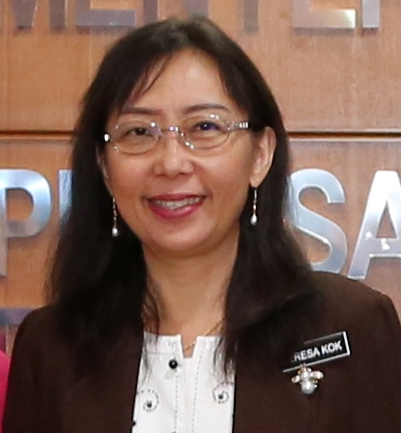

Deputy Chairperson of the Public Accounts Committee
- Incumbent
- Assumed office 16 July 2024
- Nominated by: Anwar Ibrahim
- Appointed by: Johari Abdul
- Chairperson: Mas Ermieyati Samsudin
- Preceded by: Wong Shu Qi
- Constituency: Seputeh

Minister of Primary Industries
- In office 2 July 2018 – 24 February 2020
- Monarchs: Muhammad V (2018–2019); Abdullah (2019–2020)
- Prime Minister: Mahathir Mohamad
- Deputy: Shamsul Iskandar Md. Akin
- Preceded by: Mah Siew Keong (Minister of Plantation Industries and Commodities)
- Succeeded by: Khairuddin Razali (Minister of Plantation Industries and Commodities)
- Constituency: Seputeh

Senior Member of the Selangor State Executive Council (Investment, Trade and Industry)
- In office 25 March 2008 – 29 May 2013
- Monarch: Sharafuddin
- Menteri Besar: Khalid Ibrahim
- Preceded by: Tang See Hang (Member)
- Succeeded by: Ean Yong Hian Wah (Member)
- Constituency: Kinrara

Member of the Malaysian Parliament for Seputeh
- Incumbent
- Assumed office 29 November 1999
- Preceded by: Liew Ah Kim (DAP)
- Majority: 5,200 (1999); 12,895 (2004); 36,492 (2008); 51,552 (2013); 56,059 (2018); 67,187 (2022)

Member of the Selangor State Legislative Assembly for Kinrara
- In office 8 March 2008 – 5 May 2013
- Preceded by: Kow Chong Wei (BN–MCA)
- Succeeded by: Ng Sze Han (PR–DAP)
- Majority: 5,739 (2008)

Personal details
- Born: Teresa Kok Suh Sim; 31 March 1964 (age 62) Selangor, Malaysia
- Citizenship: Malaysian
- Party: Democratic Action Party (DAP)
- Other political affiliations: Gagasan Rakyat (GR); Barisan Alternatif (BA) (1999–2004); Pakatan Rakyat (PR) (2008–2015); Pakatan Harapan (PH) (since 2015)
- Education: Universiti Malaya; Universiti Sains Malaysia; Tunku Abdul Rahman University College
- Occupation: Politician
- Website: www.teresakok.com

Teresa Kok Suh Sim (Chinese: 郭素沁; pinyin: Guō Sùqìn; Jyutping: Gwok3 Sou3 Sam3; Pe̍h-ōe-jī: Koeh Sò͘-sim; Pha̍k-fa-sṳ: Kwo̍k Su-tshim; born 31 March 1964) is a Malaysian politician who has served as Deputy Chairperson of the Public Accounts Committee (PAC) since July 2024 and the Member of Parliament (MP) for Seputeh since November 1999. She served as the Minister of Primary Industries in the Pakatan Harapan (PH) administration under former Prime Minister Mahathir Mohamad from July 2018 to the collapse of the PH administration in February 2020 and Senior Member of the Selangor State Executive Council (EXCO) in the Pakatan Rakyat (PR) state administration under former Menteri Besar Khalid Ibrahim as well as Member of the Selangor State Legislative Assembly (MLA) for Kinrara from March 2008 to May 2013. She is a member of the Democratic Action Party (DAP), a component party of the PH coalition.

== Early life and education ==
Born and raised in Kuala Lumpur, Teresa is a third generation Malaysian of Chinese descent. Kok is a member of the Hakka dialect group and her ancestors were from Huizhou, Guangdong Province, China. She commands Malay, English and Chinese Languages with fluency in Hakka and Cantonese dialects. Kok is a Catholic by religion.

She graduated with a Bachelor of Communication from Universiti Sains Malaysia (USM) in 1990, and obtained a Master of Philosophy from University of Malaya. Her thesis was on United Malays National Organization (UMNO), titled "Factionalism in Umno During Dr Mahathir's Era (1981–2001)".

Kok writes in weekly column for Chinese newspaper Sin Chew Daily. In 2004, she published a book compiling articles she wrote for the then Chinese daily.

== Political career ==
Kok was political secretary to Opposition Leader Lim Kit Siang from 1990 to 1995. In 1995 general election, she contested the Ipoh Barat Parliamentary seat on a DAP ticket but was defeated by the Malaysian Chinese Association (MCA) candidate. Kok resigned as political secretary after that to further her studies and worked part-time at the Secretariat of the Political Leaders Network Promoting Democracy in Burma (PD Burma) from 1996 till 1998.

In the 1999 general election, Kok won the Parliamentary seat of Seputeh in Kuala Lumpur with a majority of 5,200 and was re-elected in 2004 with a majority of 12,895, the largest winning margin among the 13 elected DAP MPs.

In the 2008 general election, Kok retained the Seputeh seat with a majority of 36,492, the largest majority in any constituency and won the Kinrara seat in Selangor State Legislative Assembly at the same time. She was elected in the new Selangor State Executive Council, and was named senior executive councillor who was put in charge of investment, trade and industry to ensure all funds are directed to Malaysians.

In the 2013 general election, she won re-election to Parliament, garnering over 86 percent of the formal votes cast in her Seputeh constituency.

Kok was re-elected to Seputeh seat for the fifth term in the 2018 general election but on the ticket of People's Justice Party (PKR) as the move of Pakatan Harapan using a common symbol in the election.

In view of the bad market of palm oil, she launches few palm oil drinking campaign to boost the market demand on the palm oil and further inviting local tour guide to become the ambassadors for palm oil.

== Controversies ==
=== Advise mosque to not use speaker ===
In 2008, she was arrested under the Internal Security Act (ISA). Under the act, the police have no obligation to disclose the alleged offence if any at all. The Malay newspaper Utusan Malaysia had reported she had "advised" a mosque in Puchong not to use loudspeakers while making the azan. She denied the allegation. It was found out later that a faulty loudspeaker system was the reason why the mosque did not broadcast the azan. Furthermore, while there was a petition sent to the mosque, the petition requested for the mosque to lower the volume during 'ceramah' or sermons and not during the azan. The administrator of the mosque, as well as the petitioners, confirmed that Kok was not involved in the petition. She was released on 19 September 2008. On 27 September, two Molotov cocktails were thrown into the compound of her family residence, accompanied by a warning letter. No one was hurt.

=== Seditious speech ===
In May 2014, Kok was charged with sedition for making a Chinese New Year video posted on YouTube which allegedly contained seditious elements. Kok was among the first of several other opposition politicians to be caught in a nationwide sedition dragnet.

=== Threat on police ===
On 26 February 2022, during a speech for the 2022 Johor state election, Kok asked the police to allow them to speak for 30 more minutes. Due to the Covid-19 restrictions, speeches in the electoral campaign can only be 2 hours. Kok stated that they started the speech late at 8:30pm, so they should have 2 hours till 10:30pm, but the police in charge of the speech rejected her request. After that, she said that if Pakatan Harapan is the government, they won't set such restrictions and "warned" the police to be careful. On 2 March 2022, she stated that the MCA dinner nearby had disrupted them, therefore making them starting the speech 30 minutes later. Also, she stated that the police refused them to extend the speech for 30 minutes as they are the opposition.

=== Opposition to the halal certification proposal ===
On 7 September 2024, Kok voiced her opposition to the proposal by the Malaysian Islamic Development Department (Jakim) to make the halal certification compulsory for restaurants and food establishments that do not serve pork or alcohol. Kok said that this could be a burden to small businesses and restricts consumer freedom. Her opposition was met with fierce criticisms, with UMNO Youth Chief Muhamad Akmal Saleh likening Kok to as 'nyonya tua' and sarcastically called for the government to create a non-halal logo and paste on Kok's forehead as well as asking Kok to keep quiet if she did not understand the proposal. Opposition politicians from Perikatan Nasional (PN) also slammed Kok for playing up with sensitive and religious issues involving Islam. More than 20 police reports were also lodged against Kok's statement. Prime Minister Anwar Ibrahim clarified that Kok's stance is not similar to that of PH and described Kok's comments as unnecessary. However, several politicians such as Minister of Transport and DAP Secretary-General Anthony Loke Siew Fook, former Minister in the Prime Minister's Department Zaid Ibrahim and former Deputy Chief Minister of Penang II Ramasamy Palanisamy defended Kok, arguing that Kok was just carrying out her responsibility as an MP as well as speaking and expressing the concerns on behalf of the people especially the non-Muslims. Kok later has her statement recorded in the police headquarters. With the presence of her party leaders and supporters such as DAP National Chairman Lim Guan Eng, they reiterated their previous arguments in shield of Kok. Lim also reaffirmed the party's full support for her in a press conference held shortly after recording her statement.

In October 2026, Teresa won the defamation suit against Dr Akmal Saleh at the High Court in Melaka. Dr Akmal was ordered to pay RM250,000 in damages in addition to the RM50,000 in legal costs to Teresa. He was also ordered to remove the defamatory statements from his social media accounts within seven days and also to not repeat similar remarks.

== Palm oil activism ==
Despite the criticism from activists back home, Teresa Kok kept up with her palm oil activism despite narrow scares at the ballot box. The palm oil industry reciprocated her support by providing indirect campaign support and this drew further brickbats from critics. She admonished member states of the Association of Southeast Asian Nations (ASEAN), should support one another against outside threats to an industry as important to the region as palm oil. Teresa Kok also opposed World Health Organization (WHO) advice to adult to avoid palm oil in their diet during the Covid-19 outbreak and use alternatives such as olive oil.

== Election results ==
Selangor State Legislative Assembly
Year	Constituency	Candidate	Votes	Pct	Opponent(s)	Votes	Pct	Ballots cast	Majority	Turnout
2008	N30 Kinrara	Teresa Kok Suh Sim (DAP)	12,990	64.11%	Kow Cheong Wei (MCA)	7,251	35.79%	20,517	5,739	79.31%

Parliament of Malaysia
Year	Constituency	Candidate	Votes	Pct	Opponent(s)	Votes	Pct	Ballots cast	Majority	Turnout
1995	P062 Ipoh Barat	Teresa Kok Suh Sim (DAP)	19,747	44.51%	Ho Cheong Sing (MCA)	24,616	55.49%	45,693	4,869	68.71%
1999	P110 Seputeh	Teresa Kok Suh Sim (DAP)	28,657	54.33%	Sua Chong Keh (MCA)	23,457	44.47%	52,995	5,200	73.59%
1999	P110 Seputeh	Teresa Kok Suh Sim (DAP)	28,657	54.33%	Liew Ah Kim (MDP)	457	0.87%	52,995	5,200	73.59%
1999	P110 Seputeh	Teresa Kok Suh Sim (DAP)	28,657	54.33%	Duraichelvan Murugeson (IND)	134	0.25%	52,995	5,200	73.59%
2004	P122 Seputeh	Teresa Kok Suh Sim (DAP)	33,197	62.29%	Banie Chin Yen Foo (MCA)	20,302	37.56%	53,499	12,895	62.29%
2008	P122 Seputeh	Teresa Kok Suh Sim (DAP)	47,230	81.38%	Carol Chew Chee Lin (MCA)	10,738	18.50%	58,207	36,492	75.70%
2013	P122 Seputeh	Teresa Kok Suh Sim (DAP)	61,500	85.95%	Nicole Wong Siaw Ting (MCA)	9,948	13.90%	71,859	51,552	83.58%
2018	P122 Seputeh	Teresa Kok Suh Sim (DAP)	63,094	89.97%	Chan Quin Er (MCA)	7,035	10.03%	70,583	56,059	81.83%
2022	P122 Seputeh	Teresa Kok Suh Sim (DAP)	73,234	83.74%	Alan Wong Yee Yeng (Gerakan)	6,047	6.91%	88,107	67,187	70.60%
2022	P122 Seputeh	Teresa Kok Suh Sim (DAP)	73,234	83.74%	Lee Kah Hing (MCA)	6,032	6.90%	88,107	67,187	70.60%
2022	P122 Seputeh	Teresa Kok Suh Sim (DAP)	73,234	83.74%	Lee Wai Hong (IND)	1,276	1.46%	88,107	67,187	70.60%
2022	P122 Seputeh	Teresa Kok Suh Sim (DAP)	73,234	83.74%	Choy Sen Yeh @ Lian Choy Ling (IND)	865	0.99%	88,107	67,187	70.60%

== Honours ==
=== Honours of Malaysia ===
- Malaysia
  - Recipient of the 17th Yang di-Pertuan Agong Installation Medal (2024)

== Others ==
- Kok, Teresa (2002). "Government Should Not Send The Rohingya Refugees Who Broke Into The UNHCR Office Back To Burma". Retrieved 5 November 2005.
- Kok, Teresa (2005). "Teresa Kok Suh Sim". Retrieved 29 October 2005.

Political offices
Preceded by Mah Siew Keong as Minister of Plantation Industries and Commodities	Minister of Primary Industries (Malaysia); 2 July 2018–24 February 2020	Succeeded by Khairuddin Aman Razali as Minister of Plantation Industries and Commodities
Parliament of Malaysia
Preceded by Liew Ah Kim	Member of Parliament for Seputeh; 20 December 1999–present	Incumbent
