= Raven Kumar Krishnasamy =

Malaysian politician

Yang Berhormat Tuan Raven Kumar Krishnasamy KMN MLA
- ராவன் குமார் கிருஷ்ணாசம்

Member of the Johor State Executive Council
- Incumbent
- Assumed office 13 February 2024 (Unity, Culture and Heritage)
- Monarch: Ibrahim Iskandar
- Menteri Besar: Onn Hafiz Ghazi
- Preceded by: Himself (Culture and Heritage); Ling Tian Soon (Unity)
- Constituency: Tenggaroh
- In office 26 March 2022 – 13 February 2024 (Tourism, Environment, Culture and Heritage)
- Monarch: Ibrahim Iskandar
- Menteri Besar: Onn Hafiz Ghazi
- Preceded by: Onn Hafiz Ghazi (Tourism); Vidyananthan Ramanadhan (Environment); Mazlan Bujang (Culture & Heritage)
- Succeeded by: Himself (Culture and Heritage); Onn Hafiz Ghazi (Tourism); Ling Tian Soon (Environment)
- Constituency: Tenggaroh

Member of the Johor State Legislative Assembly for Tenggaroh
- Incumbent
- Assumed office 5 May 2013
- Preceded by: Murukasvary Thanarajan (BN–MIC)
- Majority: 1,356 (2022)

Youth Chief of the Malaysian Indian Congress
- In office 22 October 2021 – 9 June 2024
- President: Vigneswaran Sanasee
- Preceded by: Thinalan T Rajagopalu
- Succeeded by: Arvind Krishnan

Faction represented in Johor State Legislative Assembly
- 2013–: Barisan Nasional

Personal details
- Born: Johor, Malaysia
- Citizenship: Malaysian
- Party: Malaysian Indian Congress (MIC)
- Other political affiliations: Barisan Nasional (BN)
- Parent: Krishnasamy Shiman (father)
- Occupation: Politician

Raven Kumar s/o Krishnasamy is a Malaysian politician who has served as Member of the Johor State Executive Council (EXCO) in the Barisan Nasional (BN) state administration under Menteri Besar Onn Hafiz Ghazi since March 2022 and Member of the Johor State Legislative Assembly (MLA) for Tenggaroh since May 2013. He is a member of the Malaysian Indian Congress (MIC), a component party of the BN coalition. He has served as the Youth Chief of MIC from October 2021 until June 2024. His father is Krishnasamy Shiman, the Tenggaroh MLA from 1990 to his assassination in an MIC building in 2008.

== Election results ==
Johor State Legislative Assembly
Year	Constituency	Candidate	Votes	Pct	Opponent(s)	Votes	Pct	Ballots cast	Majority	Turnout
2013	N33 Tenggaroh	Raven Kumar Krishnasamy (MIC)	17,054	80.85%	Murugan Muthu Samy (PKR)	4,040	19.15%	21,768	13,014	85.50%
2018	N33 Tenggaroh	Raven Kumar Krishnasamy (MIC)	12,309	54.96%	Rohamizon Abdul Ghani (PKR)	6,544	29.22%	23,025	5,765	80.40%
2018	N33 Tenggaroh	Raven Kumar Krishnasamy (MIC)	12,309	54.96%	A. Rahman A. Hamid (PAS)	3,543	15.82%	23,025	5,765	80.40%
2022	N33 Tenggaroh	Raven Kumar Krishnasamy (MIC)	10,528	49.10%	Roslan Nikmat (PAS)	9,172	42.78%	21,442	1,356	55.83%
2022	N33 Tenggaroh	Raven Kumar Krishnasamy (MIC)	10,528	49.10%	Zulinah A Johari (PKR)	1,529	7.13%	21,442	1,356	55.83%
2022	N33 Tenggaroh	Raven Kumar Krishnasamy (MIC)	10,528	49.10%	Mohd Firdaus Abd Rahman (PEJUANG)	213	0.99%	21,442	1,356	55.83%
2026	N04 Kemelah	Raven Kumar Krishnasamy (MIC)	11,893	50.62%	Mohd Afif Abd Hamid (AMANAH)	8,055	34.29%	23,802	3,838	67.30%
2026	N04 Kemelah	Raven Kumar Krishnasamy (MIC)	11,893	50.62%	Uzzair Ismail (BERSATU)	3,545	15.09%	23,802	3,838	67.30%

== Honours ==
- Malaysia
  - Officer of the Order of the Defender of the Realm (KMN) (2017)
