= Seputeh (federal constituency) =

Constituency in Kuala Lumpur, Malaysia

Seputeh (P122)
Kuala Lumpur constituency

Federal constituency
- Legislature: Dewan Rakyat
- MP: Teresa Kok; PH
- Constituency created: 1984
- First contested: 1986
- Last contested: 2022

Demographics
- Population (2020): 322,511
- Electors (2022): 124,805
- Area (km²): 31
- Pop. density (per km²): 10,403.6

Seputeh is a federal constituency in the Federal Territory of Kuala Lumpur, Malaysia, that has been represented in the Dewan Rakyat since 1986.

The federal constituency was created in the 1984 redistribution and is mandated to return a single member to the Dewan Rakyat under the first past the post voting system.

== Demographics ==
https://live.chinapress.com.my/ge15/parliament/KUALALUMPUR

Ethnic breakdown of Seputeh's electorate as of 2022
1. Chinese (76.8%)
2. Malay (13.4%)
3. Indian (8.90%)
4. Other ethnicities (0.80%)
Age breakdown of Seputeh's electorate as of 2022
1. 18-20 (5.01%)
2. 21-29 (17.0%)
3. 30-39 (17.9%)
4. 40-49 (18.6%)
5. 50-59 (16.8%)
6. 60-69 (13.5%)
7. 70-79 (7.91%)
8. 80-89 (2.77%)
9. above 90 (0.48%)
Gender breakdown of Seputeh's electorate as of 2022
1. Male (48.7%)
2. Female (51.3%)

== History ==
=== Polling districts ===
According to the gazette issued on 31 October 2022, the Seputeh constituency has a total of 22 polling districts.

Polling District	Code	Location
Kampong Penghulu Mat	122/00/01	SK Danau Perdana
Seputeh	122/00/02	SMK Desa Perdana
Taman Desa	122/00/03	SMK Taman Desa; SK Taman Desa
Kuchai	122/00/04	SJK (C) Choong Wen
Taman United	122/00/05	SK Seri Mega
Taman Happy Utara	122/00/06	SK Seri Sentosa
Taman Happy Tengah	122/00/07	SK Seri Setia
Taman Happy Selatan	122/00/08	SMK Seri Saujana
Kuchai Entrepreneurs Park	122/00/09	SJK (C) La Salle
Taman Salak South Utara	122/00/10	Institut Latihan Perindustrian Kuala Lumpur
Taman Salak South	122/00/11	SK Salak South
Taman Sri Petaling Timur	122/00/12	SK Bandar Baru Sri Petaling (2)
Taman Sri Petaling	122/00/13	SK Bandar Baru Sri Petaling (1); SRA Al-Maturidi
Bandar Sri Petaling	122/00/14	SK Seri Saujana; SMK Bandar Baru Seri Petaling
Taman Overseas Union Selatan	122/00/15	SK Seri Indah
Taman Overseas Union Utara	122/00/16	SJK (C) Yoke Nam
Taman Yarl	122/00/17	SMK Taman Yarl
Kampung Bahagia	122/00/18	SK Seri Suria
Kampung Bohol	122/00/19	SMK Dharma
PPR Muhibbah	122/00/20	SJK (T) Ladang Bukit Jalil
Bukit Jalil	122/00/21	SMK Bukit Jalil
Kampung Sungai Besi	122/00/22	SK Bukit Jalil

=== Representation history ===
Members of Parliament for Seputeh
Parliament	No	Years	Member	Party	Vote Share
Constituency created from Damansara and Sungai Besi
7th	P101	1986–1990	Liew Ah Kim (廖金華)	DAP	36,782; 69.97%
8th	P101	1990–1995	Liew Ah Kim (廖金華)	GR (DAP)	39,445; 70.59%
9th	P110	1995–1999	Liew Ah Kim (廖金華)	GR (DAP)	26,517; 55.68%
10th	P110	1999–2004	Teresa Kok Suh Sim (郭素沁)	BA (DAP)	28,657; 54.37%
11th	P122	2004–2008	Teresa Kok Suh Sim (郭素沁)	DAP	33,197; 62.05%
12th	P122	2008–2013	Teresa Kok Suh Sim (郭素沁)	PR (DAP)	47,230; 81.48%
13th	P122	2013–2015	Teresa Kok Suh Sim (郭素沁)	PR (DAP)	61,500; 86.08%
13th	P122	2015–2018	Teresa Kok Suh Sim (郭素沁)	PH (DAP)	61,500; 86.08%
14th	P122	2018–2022	Teresa Kok Suh Sim (郭素沁)	PH (DAP)	63,094; 89.97%
15th	P122	2022–present	Teresa Kok Suh Sim (郭素沁)	PH (DAP)	73,234; 83.74%

=== Historical boundaries ===
Federal constituency	Area			
Federal constituency	1984	1994	2003	2018
Seputeh	Chan Sow Lin; Kuchai Lama; Salak Selatan; Sri Petaling; Taman OUG	Kuchai Lama; Salak Selatan; Sri Petaling; Taman Desa; Taman OUG		Bukit Jalil; Kuchai Lama; Sri Petaling; Taman Desa; Taman OUG; Taman Salak Selatan

=== Local governments & postcodes ===
No.	Local Government	Postcode
P122	Kuala Lumpur City Hall	50460, 57000, 57100, 58000, 58100, 58200 Kuala Lumpur

== Election results ==
Malaysian general election, 2022
Party	Candidate	Votes	%	∆%
PH	Teresa Kok Suh Sim	73,234	83.74	▲83.74
PN	Alan Wong Yee Yeng	6,047	6.91	▲6.91
BN	Lee Kah Hing	6,032	6.90	▼3.13
Independent	Lee Wai Hong	1,276	1.46	▲1.46
Independent	Choy San Yeh @ Lian Choy Ling	865	0.99	▲0.99
Total valid votes		87,454	100.00	
Total rejected ballots		402		
Unreturned ballots		251		
Turnout		88,107	70.60	▼11.23
Registered electors		124,805		
Majority		67,187	76.83	▼3.11
PH hold		Swing		
Source(s) https://lom.agc.gov.my/ilims/upload/portal/akta/outputp/1753271/PUB%20613%20(2022)%20-%20PARLIMEN%20WP%20KUALA%20LUMPUR.pdf

Malaysian general election, 2018
Party	Candidate	Votes	%	∆%
PKR	Teresa Kok Suh Sim	63,094	89.97	▲3.89
BN	Chan Quin Er	7,035	10.03	▼3.89
Total valid votes		70,129	100.00	
Total rejected ballots		294		
Unreturned ballots		160		
Turnout		70,583	81.83	▼1.75
Registered electors		86,256		
Majority		56,059	79.94	▲56.98
PKR hold		Swing		
Source(s) "His Majesty's Government Gazette - Notice of Contested Election, Parliament for the Federal Territory of Kuala Lumpur [P.U. (B) 240/2018]" (PDF). Attorney General's Chambers of Malaysia. 3 May 2018. "Federal Government Gazette - Results of Contested Election and Statements of the Poll after the Official Addition of Votes, Parliamentary Constituencies for the Federal Territory of Kuala Lumpur [P.U. (B) 314/2018]" (PDF). Attorney General's Chambers of Malaysia. 28 May 2018.

Malaysian general election, 2013
Party	Candidate	Votes	%	∆%
DAP	Teresa Kok Suh Sim	61,500	86.08	▲4.60
BN	Nicole Wong Siaw Ting	9,948	13.92	▼4.60
Total valid votes		71,448	100.00	
Total rejected ballots		302		
Unreturned ballots		109		
Turnout		71,859	83.58	▲7.88
Registered electors		85,976		
Majority		51,552	72.16	▲49.20
DAP hold		Swing		
Source(s) "Federal Government Gazette - Notice of Contested Election, Parliament for the Federal Territory of Kuala Lumpur [P.U. (B) 177/2013]" (PDF). Attorney General's Chambers of Malaysia. 26 April 2013. Archived from the original (PDF) on 2018-10-02. "Federal Government Gazette - Results of Contested Election and Statements of the Poll after the Official Addition of Votes, Parliamentary Constituencies for the Federal Territory of Kuala Lumpur [P.U. (B) 218/2013]" (PDF). Attorney General's Chambers of Malaysia. 22 May 2013. Archived from the original (PDF) on 2018-10-02.

Malaysian general election, 2008
Party	Candidate	Votes	%	∆%
DAP	Teresa Kok Suh Sim	47,230	81.48	▲19.43
BN	Chew Chee Lin	10,738	18.52	▼19.43
Total valid votes		57,968	100.00	
Total rejected ballots		174		
Unreturned ballots		65		
Turnout		58,207	75.70	▲3.79
Registered electors		76,891		
Majority		36,492	22.96	▼1.14
DAP hold		Swing		

Malaysian general election, 2004
Party	Candidate	Votes	%	∆%
DAP	Teresa Kok Suh Sim	33,197	62.05	▲7.68
BN	Chin Yen Foo	20,302	37.95	▼6.56
Total valid votes		53,499	100.00	
Total rejected ballots		187		
Unreturned ballots		32		
Turnout		53,718	71.91	▼1.67
Registered electors		74,702		
Majority		12,895	24.10	▲23.12
DAP hold		Swing		

Malaysian general election, 1999
Party	Candidate	Votes	%	∆%
DAP	Teresa Kok Suh Sim	28,657	54.37	▼1.31
BN	Sua Chong Keh	23,457	44.51	▲0.62
MDP	Liew Ah Kim	457	0.87	▲0.87
Independent	M. Thurai	134	0.25	▲0.25
Total valid votes		52,705	100.00	
Total rejected ballots		249		
Unreturned ballots		41		
Turnout		52,995	73.58	▲2.85
Registered electors		72,014		
Majority		5,200	9.86	▼1.93
DAP hold		Swing		

Malaysian general election, 1995
Party	Candidate	Votes	%	∆%
DAP	Liew Ah Kim	26,518	55.68	▼14.91
BN	Ooi Saw Choo	20,903	43.89	▲14.48
Independent	Liew Choon Teck	203	0.43	▲0.43
Total valid votes		47,624	100.00	
Total rejected ballots		261		
Unreturned ballots		90		
Turnout		47,975	70.73	▲1.67
Registered electors		67,829		
Majority		5,615	11.79	▼29.39
DAP hold		Swing		

Malaysian general election, 1990
Party	Candidate	Votes	%	∆%
DAP	Liew Ah Kim	39,445	70.59	▲0.62
BN	Fu Ah Kiow	16,437	29.41	▼0.62
Total valid votes		55,882	100.00	
Total rejected ballots		500		
Unreturned ballots		0		
Turnout		56,382	69.06	▼1.40
Registered electors		81,644		
Majority		23,008	41.18	▲1.24
DAP hold		Swing		

Malaysian general election, 1986
Party	Candidate	Votes	%
DAP	Liew Ah Kim	36,782	69.97
BN	David Chua Kok Tee	15,789	30.03
Total valid votes		52,571	100.00
Total rejected ballots		379	
Unreturned ballots		0	
Turnout		52,950	70.46
Registered electors		75,153	
Majority		20,993	39.94
This was a new constituency created.
