= Vidyananthan Ramanadhan =

Malaysian politician

Vidyananthan Ramanadhan PSI II MLA
- வித்யானந்தன் ராமநாதன்

Member of the Johor State Executive Council (Unity and Human Resources : 14 May 2013 – 12 May 2018 & Health and Environment : 6 March 2020 – 15 March 2022)
- In office 6 March 2020 – 15 March 2022
- Monarch: Ibrahim Iskandar
- Menteri Besar: Hasni Mohammad
- Preceded by: Mohd Khuzzan Abu Bakar (Health); Tan Chen Choon (Environment)
- Succeeded by: Ling Tian Soon (Health); Raven Kumar Krishnasamy (Environment)
- Constituency: Kahang
- In office 14 May 2013 – 12 May 2018
- Monarch: Ibrahim Iskandar
- Menteri Besar: Mohamed Khaled Nordin
- Preceded by: Asojan Muniyandy
- Succeeded by: Ramakrishnan Suppiah
- Constituency: Kahang

Member of the Johor State Legislative Assembly for Kahang
- In office 8 March 2008 – 11 July 2026
- Preceded by: Ramis Subramaniam (BN–MIC)
- Succeeded by: Rugendran Vellayan (BN–MIC)
- Majority: 5,324 (2008); 7,801 (2013); 2,861 (2018); 6,698 (2022)

Personal details
- Born: Johor, Malaysia
- Citizenship: Malaysian
- Party: Malaysian Indian Congress (MIC)
- Other political affiliations: Barisan Nasional (BN)
- Parent: D. Ramanadhan (father)
- Occupation: Politician

Vidyananthan a/l Ramanadhan is a Malaysian politician who has served as Member of the Johor State Legislative Assembly (MLA) for Kahang since March 2008. He served as Member of the Johor State Executive Council (EXCO) in the Barisan Nasional (BN) state administration under former Menteri Besar Hasni Mohammad from March 2020 to March 2022 for the second term and under former Menteri Besar Mohamed Khaled Nordin from May 2013 to the collapse of the BN state administration in May 2018 for the first term. He is a member and State Chairman of Johor of the Malaysian Indian Congress (MIC), a component party of the BN coalition.

== Personal life ==
=== Death of father ===
In the morning of 10 July 2022, the father of Vidyananthan, namely D. Ramanadhan, died at the age of 79 at Batu Pahat Hospital, Johor, due to old age, leaving behind two children including Vidyananthan and two grandchildren. Ramanadhan is the former senior assistant of SK Pendidikan Khas Princess Elizabeth Johor Baru and former headmaster of SKPK St Nicholas Penang and SKPK Alma Penang. The funeral rites for Ramanadhan were held at Jalan Azizul Rahman, Kamunting in Taiping, Perak at 2 pm the next day on 11 July 2022. His remains were cremated at the Prestavest Memorial Park Taiping on the same day.

== Election results ==
Johor State Legislative Assembly
Year	Constituency	Candidate	Votes	Pct	Opponent(s)	Votes	Pct	Ballots cast	Majority	Turnout
2008	N31 Kahang	Vidyananthan Ramanadhan (MIC)	9,272	70.14%	Abdul Halim Mohamad Dawam (PKR)	3,948	29.86%	13,648	5,324	79.83%
2013	N31 Kahang	Vidyananthan Ramanadhan (MIC)	13,955	69.40%	Hamdan Basiran (PKR)	6,154	30.60%	20,494	7,801	87.71%
2018	N31 Kahang	Vidyananthan Ramanadhan (MIC)	10,768	57.66%	Noorlihan Ariffin (BERSATU)	7,907	42.34%	19,132	2,861	84.10%
2022	N31 Kahang	Vidyananthan Ramanadhan (MIC)	10,486	62.69%	Daud Yusof (BERSATU)	3,788	22.64%	16,728	6,698	57.01%
2022	N31 Kahang	Vidyananthan Ramanadhan (MIC)	10,486	62.69%	Rahani Banu Abd Rahman Krishnan (AMANAH)	2,181	13.04%	16,728	6,698	57.01%
2022	N31 Kahang	Vidyananthan Ramanadhan (MIC)	10,486	62.69%	Rosdi Amir (PEJUANG)	273	1.63%	16,728	6,698	57.01%

== Honours ==
- Johor
  - Second Class of the Sultan Ibrahim of Johor Medal (PSI II) (2015)
