= Women in the Dewan Negara =

There have been 136 women in the Dewan Negara since the establishment of the Parliament of Malaysia. As of 2018, there are 14 female senators, or 20.00% of the body.

Women have had the right to sit in Dewan Negara since 1959, however, it was not until Aishah Ghani to be appointed as the first female senator in 1962. Women have been appointed by the Yang di-Pertuan Agong and indirectly elected by all state legislatures to represent their states in the Dewan Negara. Since then, all states have had multiple female senators – in chronological order: Kedah (1975), Terengganu (1975), Pahang (1977), Sabah (1989), Kelantan (1991), Selangor (1991), Johor (1997), Negeri Sembilan (1999), Malacca (1999), Perlis (2005), Perak (2006), Sarawak (2010) and Penang (2015).

== List of female senators ==
This is an incomplete list of women who have served as members of the Dewan Negara, ordered alphabetically. This list includes women who served in the past and who continue to serve in the present.

=== Elected by the State Legislative Assembly ===
Senator	Party	State	Term start	Term end
Armani Mahiruddin	BN (UMNO)	Sabah	20 December 2005	19 December 2008
Armani Mahiruddin	BN (UMNO)	Sabah	22 December 2008	21 December 2011
Asmak Husin	PAS	Kelantan	1 July 2018	30 June 2021
Asmah Ismail	BN (UMNO)	Pahang	25 June 1990	24 June 1993
Christina Lorline Tibok @ Christine Vanhouten	BN (UPKO)	Sabah		
Christina Lorline Tibok @ Christine Vanhouten	BN (UPKO)	Sabah	31 July 2000	30 July 2003
Dayang Madinah Abang Openg	BN (PBB)	Sarawak	19 July 2010	18 July 2013
Dayang Madinah Abang Openg	BN (PBB)	Sarawak	19 July 2013	18 July 2016
Empiang Jabu	BN (PBB)	Sarawak	28 June 2004	27 June 2007
Empiang Jabu	BN (PBB)	Sarawak	11 July 2007	10 July 2010
Engku Naimah Engku Taib	BN (UMNO)	Terengganu	6 November 2015	5 November 2018
Fadhlina Sidek	PH (PKR)	Penang	1 September 2021	5 November 2022
Habibah Abdul Ghani	BN (UMNO)	Pahang	19 December 1983	18 December 1986
Habidah Jusoh	BN (UMNO)	Terengganu	23 February 1987	22 February 1990
Habidah Jusoh	BN (UMNO)	Terengganu	26 December 1989	25 December 1992
Halimah Hamzah	BN (UMNO)	Pahang		
Hasnah Fatimah Mohd Kasim	BN (UMNO)	Terengganu		
Hasnah Fatimah Mohd Kasim	BN (UMNO)	Terengganu	10 January 1984	9 January 1987
Hazizah Mohd. Sultan	BN (UMNO)	Malacca	27 December 1999	26 December 2002
Heng Seai Kie	BN (MCA)	Perak	6 December 2006	5 December 2009
Heng Seai Kie	BN (MCA)	Perak	16 November 2009	15 November 2012
Hunaizah Mohd. Noor	PAS	Kelantan	4 August 1997	3 August 2000
Ida Dumpangal née Ida Undan		Sabah	29 December 1989	28 December 1992
Jamilah Ibrahim	PAS	Kelantan	4 August 1997	3 August 2000
Juhanis Abdul Aziz	BN (UMNO)	Pahang	24 August 2021	23 August 2024
Kalthom Othman	PAS	Kelantan	24 July 1991	23 July 1994
Kalthom Othman	PAS	Kelantan	9 May 1994	8 May 1997
Kelsom Yaacub	BN (UMNO)	Pahang	13 December 1993	12 December 1996
Khadijah Awang	BN (UMNO)	Terengganu	14 May 1996	13 May 1999
Khairiah Mohamed	PAS	Kelantan	9 July 2012	8 July 2015
Khairiah Mohamed	PAS	Kelantan	1 July 2015	30 June 2018
Kian Sit Har	BN (MCA)	Malacca	19 April 1993	18 April 1996
Lee Pit Chern	BN (MCA)	Negeri Sembilan	19 May 1999	18 May 2002
Lim Hui Ying	PH (DAP)	Penang	27 August 2018	5 November 2022
Lim Kee Moi	BN (MCA)	Johor		
Lim Nget Yoon	BN (MCA)	Pahang	8 June 2012	7 June 2015
Mahimon Harun	BN (UMNO)	Pahang	9 November 1977	8 November 1980
Mariah Abdullah	BN (UMNO)	Perlis		
Melati Ali	BN (UMNO)	Pahang		
Mumtaz Md Nawi	PAS	Kelantan	19 July 2006	18 July 2009
Mumtaz Md Nawi	PAS	Kelantan	6 July 2009	5 July 2012
Ng Yen Yen	BN (MCA)	Pahang	13 December 1993	12 December 1996
Norahan Abu Bakar	BN (UMNO)	Pahang	22 June 2015	22 September 2017
Norani Beluah	BN (UMNO)	Pahang	13 July 1987	12 July 1990
Noraini Idris	BN (UMNO)	Sabah	10 December 2021	9 December 2024
Nordiana Shafie	BN (UMNO)	Terengganu	23 December 2005	22 December 2008
Nuridah Salleh	PAS	Terengganu	29 November 2018	5 November 2022
Rahmah Salleh	BN (UMNO)	Terengganu		
Ramlah Abas	BN (UMNO)	Malacca	3 May 1999	2 May 2002
Ramlah Kassim	BN (UMNO)	Pahang	6 September 1996	5 September 1999
Rohani Abdullah	BN (UMNO)	Terengganu	26 January 2012	25 January 2015
Rosalind Yau Shuk Meng	BN (MCA)	Selangor	5 August 1991	4 August 1994
Roslin Abdul Rahman	BN (UMNO)	Pahang	8 June 2012	7 June 2015
Sabani Mat	BN (UMNO)	Perlis	25 July 2018	24 July 2021
Safinah Jusoh	PAS	Terengganu	27 December 1999	26 December 2002
Samsiah Samsudin	BN (UMNO)	Appointed		
Samsiah Samsudin	BN (UMNO)	Negeri Sembilan	14 December 2006	13 December 2009
See Too Mee	BN (MCA)	Johor	24 April 2000	23 April 2003
Shahanim Mohamad Yusoff	BN (UMNO)	Kedah	30 May 2014	29 May 2017
Siti Aishah Shaik Ismail	PKR	Penang	22 June 2015	21 June 2018
Siti Fatimah Yahaya	BN (UMNO)	Pahang	10 August 2018	9 August 2021
Siti Rokiah Mohd. Zabidin	BN (UMNO)	Pahang	8 May 2006	7 May 2009
Siti Zailah Mohd Yusoff	PAS	Kelantan		
Siti Zailah Mohd Yusoff	PAS	Kelantan	1 July 2003	30 June 2006
Siw Chun Eam	BN (UMNO)	Perlis	20 December 2005	19 December 2008
Tan Ah Eng	BN (MCA)	Johor	12 May 1997	11 May 2000
Tiew Way Keng	PH (DAP)	Selangor	16 February 2025	25 February 2028
Tom Saudah Othman	BN (UMNO)	Kedah	6 January 1975	5 January 1978
Wan Ubaidah Omar	PAS	Kelantan	1 July 2003	30 June 2006
Wan Ubaidah Omar	PAS	Kelantan	19 July 2006	18 July 2009
Wan Martina	PAS	Kelantan	23 August 2021	22 August 2024
Wan Martina	PAS	Kelantan	21 November 2024	20 November 2027
Zainun A. Bakar	BN (UMNO)	Terengganu	6 May 2009	5 May 2012
Zaitun Mat	BN (UMNO)	Pahang	6 May 2009	5 May 2012
Zaitun Mat Amin	BN (UMNO)	Terengganu	8 June 2012	7 June 2015
Zawiah Abdullah	BN (UMNO)	Terengganu	6 January 1975	5 January 1978

=== Nominated by the Prime Minister and appointed by the Yang di-Pertuan Agong ===
Senator	Party		Term start	Term end
Agnes Shim Tshin Nyuk	BN (MCA)	Appointed		
Ainon Ariffin	BN (UMNO)	Appointed	18 February 1986	17 February 1989
Ainon Ariffin	BN (UMNO)	Appointed	27 March 1989	26 March 1992
Aishah Ghani	Alliance (UMNO)	Appointed	15 October 1962	14 October 1968
Aishah Ghani	Alliance (UMNO)	Appointed	22 October 1968	21 October 1974
Anna Bell @ Suzieana Perian	GRS (GAGASAN)	Appointed	5 March 2024	4 March 2027
Azizah Abdul Samad	BN (UMNO)	Appointed	26 August 2004	25 August 2007
Azizah Harun	BN (UMNO)	Appointed	6 July 2015	5 July 2018
Azizah Mohd Dun	BN (UMNO)	Appointed	4 July 2000	3 July 2003
Azizah Mohd Dun	BN (UMNO)	Appointed	12 August 2003	11 August 2006
Azizah Mohd. Said	BN (UMNO)	Appointed	29 July 1985	28 July 1988
Bathmavathi Krishnan	IND	Appointed	18 November 2013	17 November 2016
Bathmavathi Krishnan	IND	Appointed	18 November 2016	17 November 2019
Bibi Aishah Hamid Don	Alliance (UMNO)	Appointed	19 October 1964	18 October 1970
Che Jam Haron	BN (UMNO)	Appointed	27 July 1999	26 July 2002
Che Pora Omar	BN (UMNO)	Appointed	21 February 1991	20 February 1994
Che Pora Omar	BN (UMNO)	Appointed	31 March 1994	30 March 1997
Chew Lee Giok	BN (MCA)	Appointed	13 December 2010	12 December 2013
Chew Mei Fun	BN (MCA)	Appointed	9 April 2009	8 April 2012
Chew Mei Fun	BN (MCA)	Appointed	26 June 2014	25 June 2017
Chew Poh Thoi	BN (MCA)	Appointed		
Dasimah Dasir	BN (UMNO)	Appointed	20 February 1971	19 February 1974
Dasimah Dasir	BN (UMNO)	Appointed		7 October 1980
Dayang Mahani Pengiran Ahmad Raffae	BN (UMNO)	Appointed	21 July 2004	20 July 2007
Doris Sophia Brodi	BN (PRS)	Appointed	12 March 2010	11 March 2013
Doris Sophia Brodi	BN (PRS)	Appointed	12 March 2013	11 March 2016
Fahariyah Md Nordin	BN (UMNO)	Appointed	7 December 2016	6 December 2019
Faridah Abu Hassan	BN (UMNO)	Appointed	4 September 1995	3 September 1998
Fatimah Hamat	BN (UMNO)	Appointed	23 December 2008	22 December 2011
Fatimah Salim	BN (UMNO)	Appointed		
Fuziah Salleh	PH (PKR)	Appointed	9 December 2022	8 December 2025
Habshah Osman	BN (UMNO)	Appointed	27 October 1992	26 October 1995
Habshah Osman	BN (UMNO)	Appointed	4 September 1995	3 September 1998
Hafsah Othman	BN (UMNO)	Appointed	19 July 1982	18 July 1985
Jamilah Sulaiman	BN (PBS)	Appointed	7 November 2012	6 November 2015
Jamilah Sulaiman	BN (PBS)	Appointed	22 December 2015	21 December 2018
Janaky Athi Nahappan	BN (MIC)	Appointed	19 July 1982	18 July 1985
Janaky Athi Nahappan	BN (MIC)	Appointed	5 December 1983	4 December 1986
Jaya Partiban	BN (MIC)	Appointed		
Kamilia Ibrahim	BN (UMNO)	Appointed	4 September 1995	3 September 1998
Kamilia Ibrahim	BN (UMNO)	Appointed	7 April 1997	6 April 2000
Law Jack Yoon	BN (MCA)	Appointed	14 February 1987	13 February 1990
Law Jack Yoon	BN (MCA)	Appointed	18 December 1989	17 December 1992
Lim Hiang Nai @ Lim Sean Lean	BN (MCA)	Appointed	5 December 1983	4 December 1986
Loga Chitra M. Govindasamy	BN (MIC)	Appointed	6 April 2007	5 April 2010
Mariany Mohammad Yit	BN (UMNO)	Appointed	15 December 2010	14 December 2013
Mariany Mohammad Yit	BN (UMNO)	Appointed	16 December 2013	15 December 2016
Marhamah Rosli	IND	Appointed	16 December 2025	15 December 2028
Mashitah Ibrahim	BN (UMNO)	Appointed	18 March 2008	17 March 2011
Mashitah Ibrahim	BN (UMNO)	Appointed	21 March 2011	20 March 2014
Mastika Junaidah Husin	BN (UMNO)	Appointed	14 December 1994	13 December 1997
Mastika Junaidah Husin	BN (UMNO)	Appointed	9 March 1998	8 March 2001
Mazidah Zakaria	BN (UMNO)	Appointed	18 February 1986	17 February 1989
Mazidah Zakaria	BN (UMNO)	Appointed	27 March 1989	26 March 1992
Maznah Mazlan	BN (UMNO)	Appointed	21 April 2008	20 April 2011
Maznah Mazlan	BN (UMNO)	Appointed	25 April 2011	24 April 2014
Melanie Chua Chui Ket	BN (SAPP)	Appointed	2 August 1999	1 August 2002
Naomi Chong Set Mui	BN (LDP)	Appointed	2 October 2003	1 October 2006
Nen Abidah Abdullah	BN (UMNO)	Appointed	20 December 1982	19 December 1985
Nichole Wong Siaw Ting	BN (MCA)	Appointed	17 June 2022	5 November 2022
Nik Azizah Nik Yahya	BN (UMNO)	Appointed		
Nik Azizah Nik Yahya	BN (UMNO)	Appointed	17 February 2005	16 February 2008
Noorita Sual	PH (DAP)	Appointed	20 March 2023	19 March 2026
Nor Azah Awin	BN (UMNO)	Appointed	27 July 1999	26 July 2002
Nor Hayati Onn	BN (UMNO)	Appointed	14 October 2005	13 October 2008
Nor Hayati Onn	BN (UMNO)	Appointed	28 October 2008	27 October 2011
Noriah Mahat	BN (UMNO)	Appointed	3 May 2010	2 May 2013
Noriah Mahat	BN (UMNO)	Appointed	19 July 2013	18 July 2016
Norjan Khan Bahadar	BN (UMNO)	Appointed	4 December 1997	3 December 2000
Norliza Abdul Rahim	BN (UMNO)	Appointed	4 July 2011	3 July 2014
Norliza Abdul Rahim	BN (UMNO)	Appointed	30 May 2014	29 May 2017
Norraesah Mohamad	BN (UMNO)	Appointed	14 October 2005	13 October 2008
Norsimah Hashim	BN (UMNO)	Appointed	27 July 1999	26 July 2002
Ong Chong Swen	BN (MCA)	Appointed	19 February 2018	18 February 2021
Ooi Siew Kim	BN (MCA)	Appointed		
Puizah Abu Kassim	BN (UMNO)	Appointed	2 August 1999	1 August 2002
Rabiyah Ali	BN (UMNO)	Appointed	7 December 2016	6 December 2019
Rafidah Aziz	BN (UMNO)	Appointed	6 January 1975	5 January 1978
Rafidah Aziz	BN (UMNO)	Appointed	9 November 1977	8 November 1980
Rahaiah Baheran	BN (UMNO)	Appointed	27 October 1992	26 October 1995
Rahaiah Baheran	BN (UMNO)	Appointed	4 September 1995	3 September 1998
Rahemah Idris	BN (UMNO)	Appointed	7 December 2016	6 December 2019
Rahimah Mahamad	BN (UMNO)	Appointed	20 February 2014	19 February 2017
Rahimah Mahamad	BN (UMNO)	Appointed	31 March 2017	30 March 2020
Rahmah Othman	BN (UMNO)	Appointed	6 April 1979	5 April 1982
Raj Munni Sabu	PH (AMANAH)	Appointed	27 August 2018	26 August 2021
Raja Ropiah Raja Abdullah	BN (UMNO)	Appointed	9 April 2012	8 April 2015
Ras Adiba Mohd Radzi	IND	Appointed	20 May 2020	19 May 2023
Rhina Bhar	BN (Gerakan)	Appointed	13 October 2004	12 October 2007
Rita Samariah Patrick Insol	GPS (PRS)	Appointed	22 June 2020	21 June 2023
Rita Samariah Patrick Insol	GPS (PRS)	Appointed	20 November 2023	19 November 2027
Rogayah Ariff	BN (UMNO)	Appointed	15 December 1980	14 December 1983
Rogayah Ariff	BN (UMNO)	Appointed	13 April 1981	12 April 1984
Rogayah Che Mat	BN (UMNO)	Appointed	18 February 1986	17 February 1989
Rogayah Che Mat	BN (UMNO)	Appointed	27 March 1989	26 March 1992
Rokiah @ Maimun Zainuddin	BN (UMNO)	Appointed	8 August 1983	7 August 1986
Rokiah @ Maimun Zainuddin	BN (UMNO)	Appointed	1 December 1986	30 November 1989
Ros Suyati Alang	BN (UMNO)	Appointed	20 September 2022	19 September 2025
Rosni Sohar	BN (UMNO)	Appointed	9 January 2025	8 January 2028
Rosnah Mohd. Salleh	BN (UMNO)	Appointed	23 February 1987	22 February 1990
Rosnah Mohd. Salleh	BN (UMNO)	Appointed	20 February 1990	19 February 1993
S. Bagiam Ayem Perumal	BN (MIC)	Appointed	22 August 2011	21 August 2014
S. Bagiam Ayem Perumal	BN (MIC)	Appointed	25 August 2014	24 August 2017
Salbiah Mohd. Akim	BN (UMNO)	Appointed	1 December 1986	30 November 1989
Salbiah Mohd. Akim	BN (UMNO)	Appointed	5 July 1989	4 July 1992
Salmah Sheikh Hussein	BN (UMNO)	Appointed	6 January 1975	5 January 1978
Salmah Sheikh Hussein	BN (UMNO)	Appointed	9 August 1976	8 August 1979
Sarasa Velu	BN (MIC)	Appointed	16 December 1992	15 December 1995
Sarasa Velu	BN (MIC)	Appointed	20 March 1996	19 March 1999
Saraswathy Kandasami	PH (PKR)	Appointed	9 December 2022	8 December 2025
Selemiah Hashim	BN (UMNO)	Appointed	19 April 1993	18 April 1996
Selemiah Hashim	BN (UMNO)	Appointed	30 July 1996	29 July 1999
Shahanim Mohamad Yusoff	BN (UMNO)	Appointed	16 November 2017	15 November 2020
Shahrizat Abdul Jalil	BN (UMNO)	Appointed	9 April 2009	8 April 2012
Sharifah Azizah Syed Zain	BN (UMNO)	Appointed		
Sharifah Azizah Syed Zain	BN (UMNO)	Appointed	9 March 2007	8 March 2010
Sharipah Aminah Syed Mohamed	BN (UMNO)	Appointed	13 December 2004	12 December 2007
Sharipah Aminah Syed Mohamed	BN (UMNO)	Appointed	13 December 2007	12 December 2010
Siti Fatimah Sheikh Hussein	BN (UMNO)	Appointed		
Siti Hawa @ Karimah Mohd. Nor	BN (UMNO)	Appointed	12 August 1998	11 August 2001
Sopiah Sharif	BN (UMNO)	Appointed	17 July 2017	16 July 2020
Susan Chemarai Anding	GPS (PBB)	Appointed	22 June 2020	21 June 2023
Susan Chemarai Anding	GPS (PBB)	Appointed	21 August 2023	20 August 2027
Usha Nandhini S. Jayaram	BN (MIC)	Appointed	15 July 2008	14 July 2011
Valli Muthusamy	BN (MIC)	Appointed	15 December 1986	14 December 1989
Valli Muthusamy	BN (MIC)	Appointed	11 December 1989	10 December 1992
Wan Asiah Ahmad	BN (UMNO)	Appointed	11 November 1997	10 November 2000
Wan Asiah Ahmad	BN (UMNO)	Appointed	2 November 2000	1 November 2003
Wan Hazani Wan Mohd Nor	BN (UMNO)	Appointed	14 October 2005	13 October 2008
Wan Hazani Wan Mohd Nor	BN (UMNO)	Appointed	3 December 2008	2 December 2011
Wan Intan Wan Ahmad Tajuddin	BN (UMNO)	Appointed	27 October 1992	26 October 1995
Wan Intan Wan Ahmad Tajuddin	BN (UMNO)	Appointed	4 September 1995	3 September 1998
Wan Ramlah Ahmad	BN (UMNO)	Appointed	8 January 2007	7 January 2010
Zaleha Husin	BN (UMNO)	Appointed	13 April 1992	12 April 1995
Zunairah Musa	BN (UMNO)	Appointed	22 December 2021	21 December 2024
