= Tenggaroh (state constituency) =

Tenggaroh (N33)
Johor constituency

State constituency
- Legislature: Johor State Legislative Assembly
MLA
Mohd Youzaimi Yusof
BN
- Constituency created: 1984
- First contested: 1986
- Last contested: 2026

Demographics
- Population (2020): 44,950
- Electors (2026): 39,001
- Area (km²): 1,745

Tenggaroh is a state constituency in Johor, Malaysia, that is represented in the Johor State Legislative Assembly.

The state constituency was first contested in 1986 and is mandated to return a single Assemblyman to the Johor State Legislative Assembly under the first-past-the-post voting system.

== Demographics ==
As of 2020, Tenggaroh has a population of 44,950 people.

Ethnic breakdown of Tenggaroh's electorate as of 2026
1. Malay (83.4%)
2. Chinese (12.8%)
3. Indian (2.30%)
4. Other ethnicities (1.40%)

== History ==
=== Polling districts ===
According to the gazette issued on 2 July 2026, the Tenggaroh constituency has a total of 24 polling districts.

State constituency	Polling districts	Code	Location
Tenggaroh（N33）	Bandar Utara	154/33/01	SA Bukit Timbalan
Tenggaroh（N33）	Jalan Jamaluang	154/33/02	SMK Sri Mersing
Tenggaroh（N33）	FELDA Nitar 2	154/33/03	SK LKTP Nitar 2
Tenggaroh（N33）	FELDA Nitar 1	154/33/04	SK LKTP Nitar 1
Tenggaroh（N33）	Pengkalan Batu	154/33/05	SA Pengkalan Batu
Tenggaroh（N33）	Jalan Ismail	154/33/06	SJK (C) Pai Chee
Tenggaroh（N33）	Pejabat Kerajaan	154/33/07	SK Bandar Mersing
Tenggaroh（N33）	Pekan Mersing Kechil	154/33/08	SK Sri Mersing
Tenggaroh（N33）	Sri Pantai	154/33/09	SK Seri Pantai
Tenggaroh（N33）	Bandar Jamaluang Timor	154/33/10	Dewan Seberguna Kampung Baru Jemaluang
Tenggaroh（N33）	Jamaluang Timor	154/33/11	SK (FELDA) Tenggaroh 5
Tenggaroh（N33）	Jamaluang	154/33/12	SJK (C) Jemaluang
Tenggaroh（N33）	RISDA Sungai Ambat	154/33/13	Balai Raya Kg. Baru Estet Koperasi Sg. Ambat
Tenggaroh（N33）	FELDA Tenggaroh 5	154/33/14	SMK Tan Sri Abdul Kadir
Tenggaroh（N33）	FELDA Tenggaroh 3	154/33/15	SK (FELDA) Tenggaroh 3
Tenggaroh（N33）	FELDA Tenggaroh 6	154/33/16	SK (FELDA) Tenggaroh 6
Tenggaroh（N33）	FELDA Tenggaroh 4	154/33/17	SK (FELDA) Tenggaroh 4
Tenggaroh（N33）	FELDA Tenggaroh 2	154/33/18	SK (FELDA) Tenggaroh 2
Tenggaroh（N33）	FELDA Tenggaroh 1	154/33/19	SK (FELDA) Tenggaroh 1
Tenggaroh（N33）	Pulau Sibu	154/33/20	Balai Raya Pulau Sibu
Tenggaroh（N33）	Pulau Tinggi	154/33/21	SK Pulau Tinggi
Tenggaroh（N33）	Pulau Besar	154/33/22	Balai Raya Pulau Besar
Tenggaroh（N33）	Pulau Aur	154/33/23	Balai Raya Pulau Aur
Tenggaroh（N33）	Pulau Pemanggil	154/33/24	SK Pulau Pemanggil

=== Representation history ===
Members of the Legislative Assembly for Tenggaroh
Assembly	No	Years	Member	Party
Constituency created from Mersing and Endau
7th	N10	1986-1990	Arumugam Chettiar Verru Chettiar (ஆறுமுகம் செட்டியார் வெற்று செட்டியார்)	BN (MIC)
8th	N10	1990-1995	Singgatore Achotan (சிங்கத்தோர் அச்சோட்டன்)	BN (MIC)
9th	N10	1995-1999	Krishnasamy Shiman (ஷி. கிருஷ்ணசாமி)	BN (MIC)
10th	N10	1999-2004	Krishnasamy Shiman (ஷி. கிருஷ்ணசாமி)	BN (MIC)
11th	N33	2004-2008	Krishnasamy Shiman (ஷி. கிருஷ்ணசாமி)	BN (MIC)
12th	N33	2008-2013	Murukasvary Thanarajan (முருகேஸ்வரி தனராஜன்)	BN (MIC)
13th	N33	2013-2018	Raven Kumar Krishnasamy (ராவன் குமார் கிருஷ்ணசாமி)	BN (MIC)
14th	N33	2018-2022	Raven Kumar Krishnasamy (ராவன் குமார் கிருஷ்ணசாமி)	BN (MIC)
15th	N33	2022–2026	Raven Kumar Krishnasamy (ராவன் குமார் கிருஷ்ணசாமி)	BN (MIC)
16th	N33	2026–present	Mohd Youzaimi Yusof	BN (UMNO)

== Election results ==
Johor state election, 2026
Party	Candidate	Votes	%	∆%
BN	Mohd Youzaimi Yusof	19,170	74.58	▲25.48
PN	Muhamad Amerul Muhamad	3,912	15.22	▼27.56
PH	Md Yusof Dawam	2,623	10.20	▲10.20
Total valid votes		25,705	100.00	
Total rejected ballots		378		
Unreturned ballots		64		
Turnout		26,147	67.04	▲9.81
Registered electors		39,001		
Majority		15,258	59.36	▲53.03
BN hold		Swing		

Johor state election, 2022
Party	Candidate	Votes	%	∆%
BN	Raven Kumar Krishnasamy	10,528	49.10	▼5.86
PN	Roslan Nikmat	9,172	42.78	▲42.78
PKR	Zulinah A Johari	1,529	7.13	▼22.09
PEJUANG	Mohd Firdaus Abd Rahman	213	0.99	▲0.99
Total valid votes		21,442	100.00	
Total rejected ballots		423		
Unreturned ballots		117		
Turnout		21,982	57.23	▼23.17
Registered electors		38,408		
Majority		1,356	6.32	▼19.42
BN hold		Swing		

Johor state election, 2018
Party	Candidate	Votes	%	∆%
BN	Raven Kumar Krishnasamy	12,309	54.96	▼25.89
PKR	Rahamizon Abdul Ghani	6,544	29.22	▲10.07
PAS	A. Rahman A. Hamid	3,543	15.82	▲15.82
Total valid votes		22,396	100.00	
Total rejected ballots		550		
Unreturned ballots		79		
Turnout		23,025	80.40	▼5.11
Registered electors		28,638		
Majority		5,765	25.74	▼35.95
BN hold		Swing		

Johor state election, 2013
Party	Candidate	Votes	%	∆%
BN	Raven Kumar Krishnasamy	17,054	80.85	▲4.02
PKR	Murugan Muthusamy	4,040	19.15	▲19.15
Total valid votes		21,094	100.00	
Total rejected ballots		617		
Unreturned ballots		57		
Turnout		21,768	85.51	▲6.21
Registered electors		25,457		
Majority		13,014	61.70	▲8.04
BN hold		Swing		

Johor state election, 2008
Party	Candidate	Votes	%	∆%
BN	Murukasvary S. Thanarajan	11,789	76.83	▼6.22
PAS	Shahar Abdullah	3,556	23.17	▲6.22
Total valid votes		15,345	100.00	
Total rejected ballots		527		
Unreturned ballots		127		
Turnout		15,999	79.30	▲4.02
Registered electors		20,176		
Majority		8,233	53.65	▼12.45
BN hold		Swing		

Johor state election, 2004
Party	Candidate	Votes	%	∆%
BN	Krishnasamy Shiman	10,412	83.05	▲8.52
PAS	Shekh Abdullah Said Salleh	2,125	16.95	▲16.95
Total valid votes		12,537	100.00	
Total rejected ballots		275		
Unreturned ballots		21		
Turnout		12,833	75.28	▲3.19
Registered electors		17,048		
Majority		8,287	66.10	▲17.04
BN hold		Swing		

Johor state election, 1999
Party	Candidate	Votes	%	∆%
BN	Krishnasamy Shiman	11,471	74.53	▼2.09
PKR	Terng Liok Seng	3,920	25.47	▲25.47
Total valid votes		15,391	100.00	
Total rejected ballots		689		
Unreturned ballots		32		
Turnout		16,112	72.08	▲1.32
Registered electors		22,352		
Majority		7,551	49.06	▼4.17
BN hold		Swing		

Johor state election, 1995
Party	Candidate	Votes	%	∆%
BN	Krishnasamy Shiman	11,451	76.62	▲14.92
S46	Muda Chik	3,495	23.38	▲23.38
Total valid votes		14,946	100.00	
Total rejected ballots		19		
Unreturned ballots		42		
Turnout		15,007	70.76	▼5.33
Registered electors		21,207		
Majority		7,956	53.23	▲29.85
BN hold		Swing		

Johor state election, 1990
Party	Candidate	Votes	%	∆%
BN	Singgatore Achotan	8,613	61.69	▲9.80
DAP	Lim Ser Ho	5,348	38.31	▼3.25
Total valid votes		13,961	100.00	
Total rejected ballots		771		
Unreturned ballots		0		
Turnout		14,732	76.10	▲6.70
Registered electors		19,359		
Majority		3,265	23.39	▲13.04
BN hold		Swing		

Johor state election, 1986
Party	Candidate	Votes	%
BN	Arumugam Chettiar Verru Chettiar	4,662	51.90
DAP	Lim Ser Ho	3,733	41.56
PAS	Mokhtar Yahaya	383	4.26
Independent	Sheikh Abdullah Awab	205	2.28
Total valid votes		8,983	100.00
Total rejected ballots		602	
Unreturned ballots		0	
Turnout		9,585	69.40
Registered electors		13,812	
Majority		929	10.34
This was a new constituency created.
