= Yong Peng (state constituency) =

State constituency in Johor, Malaysia

Yong Peng (N19)
Johor constituency

State constituency
- Legislature: Johor State Legislative Assembly
MLA
Ling Tian Soon
BN
- Constituency created: 2003
- First contested: 2004
- Last contested: 2026

Demographics
- Population (2020): 42,090
- Electors (2026): 34,023
- Area (km²): 555

Yong Peng is a state constituency in Johor, Malaysia, that is represented in the Johor State Legislative Assembly.

The state constituency was first contested in 2004 and is mandated to return a single Assemblyman to the Johor State Legislative Assembly under the first-past-the-post voting system.

== Demographics ==
As of 2020, Yong Peng has a population of 42,090 people.

Ethnic breakdown of Yong Peng's electorate as of 2026
1. Chinese (56.8%)
2. Malay (35.2%)
3. Indian (6.80%)
4. Other ethnicities (1.20%)

== History ==
=== Polling districts ===
According to the gazette issued on 2 July 2026, the Yong Peng constituency has a total of 13 polling districts.

State constituency	Polling Districts	Code	Location
Yong Peng (N19)	Sri Sepakat	148/19/01	SK Sepakat Jaya
Yong Peng (N19)	Lam Lee	148/19/02	SJK (C) Lam Lee
Yong Peng (N19)	Ladang Chaah	148/19/03	Dewan Orang Ramai Kampung Hj Kamisan
Yong Peng (N19)	Ladang Yong Peng Bhg. 'B'	148/19/04	SJK (T) Ladang Yong Peng
Yong Peng (N19)	Kangkar Bahru	148/19/05	SJK (C) Kangkar Bahru
Yong Peng (N19)	Yong Peng Utara	148/19/06	SK Taman Seri Kota; SA Taman Kota; Pusat Komuniti Kospen Kg Temehil; SMK Yong Peng
Yong Peng (N19)	Bandar Yong Peng Utara	148/19/07	SK Seri Bertam
Yong Peng (N19)	Bandar Yong Peng Tengah	148/19/08	SJK (C) Yong Peng (1)
Yong Peng (N19)	Bandar Yong Peng Selatan	148/19/09	SK Yong Peng
Yong Peng (N19)	Yong Peng Selatan	148/19/10	SK Seri Yong Peng; SMK Dato Seth
Yong Peng (N19)	Ladang Yong Peng	148/19/11	SK Ladang Yong Peng
Yong Peng (N19)	Kampong Manong	148/19/12	SJK (C) Sri Lalang
Yong Peng (N19)	Taman Jelita	148/19/13	SJK (C) Yong Peng (1)

=== Representation history ===
Members of the Legislative Assembly for Yong Peng
Assembly	No	Years	Member	Party
Constituency created from Sri Medan and Parit Yaani
11th	N19	2004–2008	Lim Kee Moi (林其妹)	BN (MCA)
12th	N19	2008–2013	Lim Kee Moi (林其妹)	BN (MCA)
13th	N19	2013–2018	Chew Peck Choo (周碧珠)	PR (DAP)
14th	N19	2018–2022	Chew Peck Choo (周碧珠)	PH (DAP)
15th	N19	2022–2026	Ling Tian Soon (林添順)	BN (MCA)
16th	N19	2026-present	Ling Tian Soon (林添順)	BN (MCA)

== Election results ==
Johor state election, 2026
Party	Candidate	Votes	%	∆%
BN	Ling Tian Soon	13,630	60.16	▲7.32
PH	Yong Hui Yi	9,027	39.84	▲1.68
Total valid votes		22,657	100.00	
Total rejected ballots		246		
Unreturned ballots		22		
Turnout		22,925	67.38	▲9.85
Registered electors		34,023		
Majority		4,603	20.32	▲5.64
BN hold		Swing		

Johor state election, 2022
Party	Candidate	Votes	%	∆%
BN	Ling Tian Soon	9,870	52.84	▲18.08
PH	Alan Tee Boon Tsong	7,129	38.16	▲38.16
PN	Susan Yong Hui Ling	1,681	9.00	▲9.00
Total valid votes		18,680	98.23	
Total rejected ballots		254	1.34	
Unreturned ballots		83	0.44	
Turnout		19,017	57.53	▼27.25
Registered electors		33,053		
Majority		2,741	14.68	▼9.86
BN gain from PKR		Swing		?
Source(s) "RESULTS OF CONTESTED ELECTION AND STATEMENTS OF THE POLL AFTER THE OFFICIAL ADDITION OF VOTES" (PDF).

Johor state election, 2018
Party	Candidate	Votes	%	∆%
PKR	Chew Peck Choo	12,307	59.30	▲59.30
BN	Ling Tian Soon	7,218	34.76	▼8.79
PAS	Muhammad Abdullah	1,243	5.99	▲5.99
Total valid votes		20,768	98.37	
Total rejected ballots		300	1.85	
Unreturned ballots		45	0.16	
Turnout		21,113	84.78	▼2.32
Registered electors		24,903		
Majority		5,089	24.54	▲11.64
PKR hold		Swing		
Source(s) "RESULTS OF CONTESTED ELECTION AND STATEMENTS OF THE POLL AFTER THE OFFICIAL ADDITION OF VOTES".

Johor state election, 2013
Party	Candidate	Votes	%	∆%
DAP	Chew Peck Choo	10,825	56.45	▲15.59
BN	Lim Kee Moi	8,350	43.55	▼15.59
Total valid votes		19,175	97.91	
Total rejected ballots		365	1.86	
Unreturned ballots		44	0.22	
Turnout		19,584	87.10	▲9.98
Registered electors		22,484		
Majority		2,475	12.90	▼5.38
DAP gain from BN		Swing		?
Source(s) "KEPUTUSAN PILIHAN RAYA UMUM DEWAN UNDANGAN NEGERI". Archived from the original on 2022-05-08.

Johor state election, 2008
Party	Candidate	Votes	%	∆%
BN	Lim Kee Moi	8,064	59.14	▼6.40
DAP	Ng Lam Swa	5,571	40.86	▲6.40
Total valid votes		13,635	96.47	
Total rejected ballots		490	3.47	
Unreturned ballots		9	0.06	
Turnout		14,134	77.12	▲1.84
Registered electors		18,328		
Majority		2,493	18.28	▼12.80
BN hold		Swing		
Source(s) "KEPUTUSAN PILIHAN RAYA UMUM DEWAN UNDANGAN NEGERI PERAK BAGI TAHUN 2008".

Johor state election, 2004
Party	Candidate	Votes	%
BN	Lim Kee Moi	8,112	65.54
DAP	Chew Peck Choo	4,265	34.46
Total valid votes		12,377	96.18
Total rejected ballots		492	3.82
Unreturned ballots		0	0.00
Turnout		12,869	75.28
Registered electors		17,094	
Majority		3,847	31.08
This was a new constituency created.
Source(s) "KEPUTUSAN PILIHAN RAYA UMUM DEWAN UNDANGAN NEGERI PERAK BAGI TAHUN 2004".
