= Wee Ka Siong =

Malaysian politician and engineer

Yang Berhormat Datuk Seri Ir Dr Wee Ka Siong DGSM DMSM FICE MP
- 魏家祥
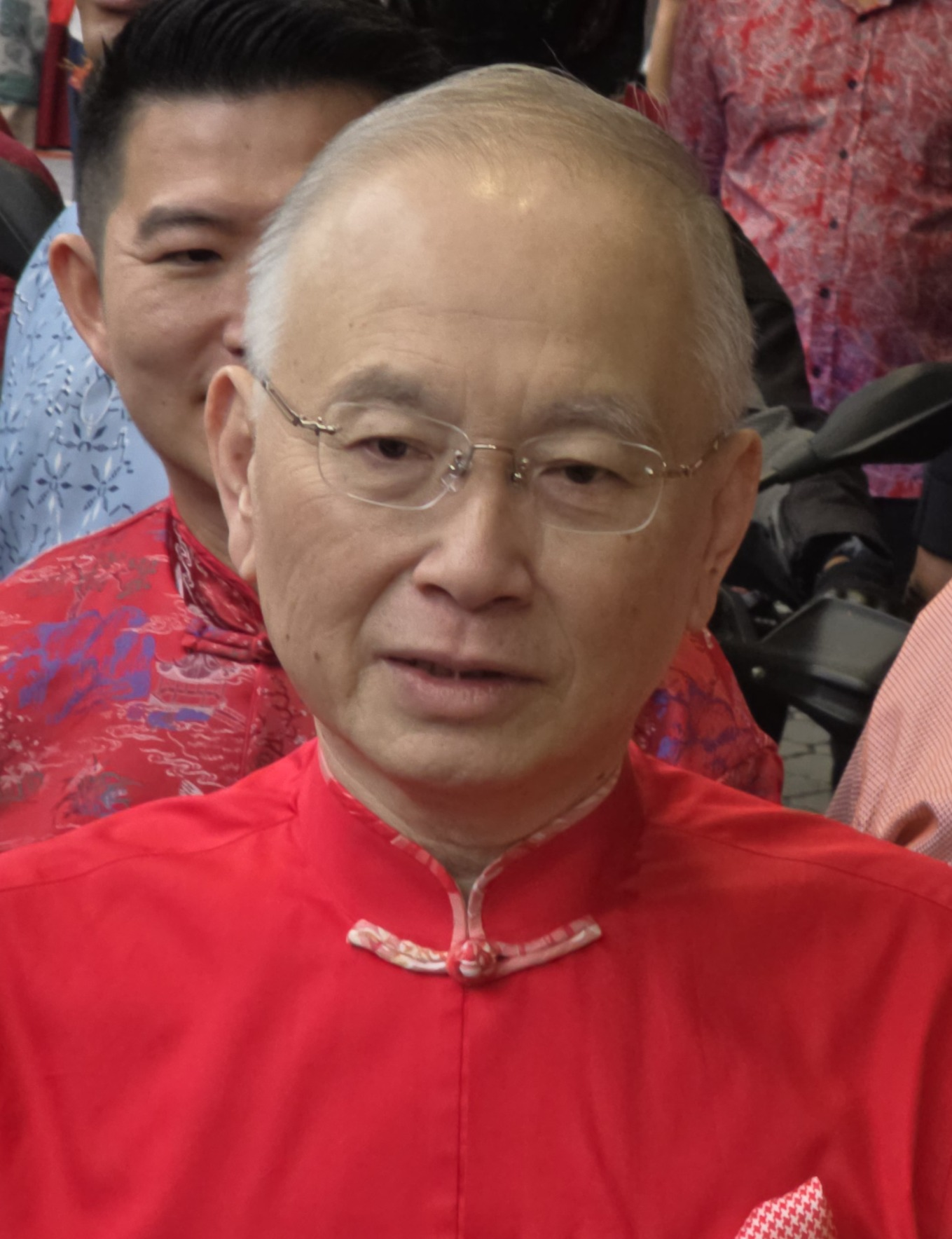
- Wee in 2026

Minister of Transport
- In office 30 August 2021 – 24 November 2022
- Monarch: Abdullah
- Prime Minister: Ismail Sabri Yaakob
- Deputy: Henry Sum Agong
- Preceded by: Himself
- Succeeded by: Anthony Loke Siew Fook
- Constituency: Ayer Hitam
- In office 10 March 2020 – 16 August 2021
- Monarch: Abdullah
- Prime Minister: Muhyiddin Yassin
- Deputy: Hasbi Habibollah
- Preceded by: Anthony Loke Siew Fook
- Succeeded by: Himself
- Constituency: Ayer Hitam

11th President of the Malaysian Chinese Association
- Incumbent
- Assumed office 4 November 2018
- Deputy: Mah Hang Soon
- Preceded by: Liow Tiong Lai

Member of the Malaysian Parliament for Ayer Hitam
- Incumbent
- Assumed office 21 March 2004
- Preceded by: Position established
- Majority: 15,763 (2004); 13,909 (2008); 7,310 (2013); 303 (2018); 2,963 (2022)
Ministerial offices
Minister in the Prime Minister's Department
In office 14 May 2013 – 9 May 2018
| Monarchs | Abdul Halim; Muhammad V |
| Prime Minister | Najib Razak |
| Preceded by | Position established |
| Succeeded by | Position abolished |
| Constituency | Ayer Hitam |
Deputy Minister of Education
In office 19 March 2008 – 14 May 2013 Serving with Razali Ismail (2008–2010); Mohd Puad Zarkashi (2010–2013)
| Monarchs | Mizan Zainal Abidin; Abdul Halim |
| Prime Minister | Abdullah Ahmad Badawi; Najib Razak |
| Minister | Hishammuddin Hussein (2008); Muhyiddin Yassin (2008–2013) |
| Preceded by | Hon Choon Kim |
| Succeeded by | Kamalanathan Panchanathan |
| Constituency | Ayer Hitam |
Party offices
Deputy President of the Malaysian Chinese Association
In office 21 December 2013 – 3 November 2018
| President | Liow Tiong Lai |
| Preceded by | Liow Tiong Lai |
| Succeeded by | Mah Hang Soon |
Youth Chief of the Malaysian Chinese Association
In office 13 October 2008 – 21 December 2013
| President | Ong Tee Keat; Chua Soi Lek |
| Deputy | Mah Hang Soon |
| Preceded by | Liow Tiong Lai |
| Succeeded by | Chong Sin Woon |

Faction represented in Dewan Rakyat
- 2004–: Barisan Nasional

Personal details
- Born: Wee Ka Siong; 20 October 1968 (age 57) Jasin, Malacca, Malaysia
- Party: Malaysian Chinese Association (MCA) (1992-Present)
- Other political affiliations: Barisan Nasional (BN) (1992-Present)
- Spouse: Jessica Lim Hai Ean
- Children: 2
- Education: University of Technology Malaysia (BEng, PhD); Nanyang Technological University (MEng)
- Occupation: Politician
- Profession: Engineer
- Website: weekasiong.com.my

Wee Ka Siong (Chinese: 魏家祥; pinyin: Wèi Jiāxiáng; Pe̍h-ōe-jī: Gūi Ka-siông; born 20 October 1968) is a Malaysian politician and engineer who has served as the Member of Parliament (MP) for Ayer Hitam since March 2004. He served as Minister of Transport for the second term in the Barisan Nasional (BN) administration under Prime Minister Ismail Sabri Yaakob from August 2021 to the collapse of the BN administration in November 2022 and his first term in the Perikatan Nasional (PN) administration under former Prime Minister Muhyiddin Yassin from March 2020 to the collapse of the PN administration in August 2021, Minister in the Prime Minister's Department and the Deputy Minister of Education in the BN administration under former Prime Ministers Abdullah Ahmad Badawi and Najib Razak as well as former Ministers Hishammuddin Hussein and Muhyiddin from March 2008 to the collapse of the BN administration in May 2018. He is a member of the Malaysian Chinese Association (MCA), a component party of the BN coalition. He has also served as the 11th President of MCA since November 2018. He also served as the Deputy President of MCA from December 2013 to his promotion to the party presidency in November 2018 as well as the Youth Chief of MCA from October 2008 to his promotion to the party deputy president in December 2013. He was the sole minister of Chinese ethnicity and MCA in the PN and BN administrations from March 2020 to November 2022 and sole MCA candidate to be elected in the 2018 general election.

== Early life and education ==
He was born in Jasin, Melaka to a Hakka clan and later brought up in Tampin, Negeri Sembilan. He attended the SJK(C) Yu Hsien primary school and Sekolah Menengah Kebangsaan Datuk Bendahara Jasin, Melaka.

He studied Civil Engineering at the Universiti Teknologi Malaysia (UTM) in 1986–1991. He later pursued his Master in Traffic Engineering at the Nanyang Technological University, Singapore from 1993 to 1996 and a PhD in Transportation Planning at the UTM from 1996 to 2001. He is a qualified Civil Engineer and is a member of the Board of Engineers Malaysia (BEM).

He is married to Datin Seri Jessica Lim Hai Ean (林海燕), a lawyer and they have 2 children, a daughter and a son.

== Early political career ==
Wee begin his political career in Johor Bahru Malaysian Chinese Association, which he joined in 1992.. He was the Division Secretary of MCA Johor Bahru Division from 1993 to 2005. After that, he is elected as Johor Bahru's MCA Majidi Branch chairman from 1996 to 2008, and became the MCA Johor Bahru Division Youth Chief from 2002 to 2008.

In 2005 during the National MCA Youth election, he was elected as the National MCA Youth Wing Secretary General, and was appointed the National MCA Youth Education Bureau Chief (2005–2008). He was awarded The Outstanding Young Malaysian (TOYM) Award (Politics, Governmental Affairs & Legal) (马来西亚十大杰出青年奖) by the Junior Chamber International Malaysia; this award was presented to him by Dato' Sri Ong Tee Keat, then Deputy Minister of Youth and Sports, in Kuala Lumpur on 25 November 2005.

On 13 October 2008, Wee was elected unopposed as the MCA Youth Chief for the 2008–2011 term, taking over the position from the Health Minister, Dato' Sri Liow Tiong Lai. On 11 November 2008, Wee Ka Siong was elected to lead the MCA Malacca State Liaison Committee. Prior to this, he was the secretary general for Malaysia Chinese Association Youth Wing.

In 2013, he contested, and won, the deputy presidency of the full party.

== Minister in the Prime Minister's Department (2013–2018) ==
After the MCA's disastrous performance in the 2013 election, losing eight of its fifteen seats, the MCA voluntarily withdrew from its ministerial positions. Wee Ka Siong, by then the deputy president of the party, was then later appointed to the Cabinet as Minister in the Prime Minister's Department after a minor cabinet reshuffle.

After months of public speculations about Wee's health, on 2 May 2016 he made a statement that he would undergo a spinal surgery abroad and promised he will recover and return to duty soon.

Wee Ka Siong is the only member of MCA to hold a seat in the parliament after the Malaysian general election in May 2018.

== Transport Minister (2020-2022) ==
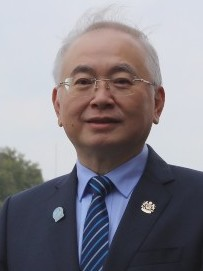
Wee in London in 2021

After the 2020–21 Malaysian political crisis, Wee was appointed as Minister of Transport by the then-ruling Perikatan Nasional government.

Loke Siew Fook took over as Minister of Transport following the 2022 Malaysian general election.

== Controversies and issues ==
=== Cabotage policy ===
Wee Ka Siong, had on 13 November 2020, signed a federal gazette revoking the cabotage exemption to foreign ships involved in the repair of submarine cables, which connects Malaysia to the global internet network. The exemption helped speed up repairs of submarine cables that are damaged from time to time, causing internet disruption in the country. In November 23, tech giants, including Microsoft, Google and Facebook, have turned to Prime Minister Muhyiddin Yassin for intervention over a decision by Wee Ka Siong, which they say will hamper Malaysia's internet infrastructure.

On 26 November, Wee Ka Siong has assured tech giants Google, Facebook, Microsoft and Malaysia Internet Exchange (MyIX) that foreign vessels would be allowed to carry out undersea communications cable repair works if local vessels are unable to do it or are located too far from the areas where repairs are needed.

The long-running spat between Wee Ka Siong and DAP's Lim Guan Eng over the cabotage policy on foreign ships that repair submarine cables in Malaysia. On 2 November 2021, the two rival politicians are set for a one-hour debate session that started at 9.30pm. It is aired on Astro Awani and 8TV, as well as on TV3's social media pages.

== Election results ==
Parliament of Malaysia
| Year | Constituency | Candidate | Votes | Pct | Opponent(s) | Votes | Pct | Ballots cast | Majority | Turnout |
|---|---|---|---|---|---|---|---|---|---|---|
| 2004 | P148 Ayer Hitam | Wee Ka Siong (MCA) | 20,065 | 82.34% | Mohd Zamri Mat Taksis (PAS) | 4,302 | 17.66% | 25,218 | 15,763 | 76.87% |
| 2008 | P148 Ayer Hitam | Wee Ka Siong (MCA) | 20,230 | 76.11% | Hussin Sujak (PAS) | 6,321 | 23.78% | 27,488 | 13,909 | 78.98% |
| 2013 | P148 Ayer Hitam | Wee Ka Siong (MCA) | 22,045 | 59.79% | Hu Pang Chaw (PAS) | 14,735 | 39.96% | 37,839 | 7,310 | 88.18% |
| 2018 | P148 Ayer Hitam | Wee Ka Siong (MCA) | 17,076 | 43.98% | Liew Chin Tong (DAP) | 16,773 | 43.20% | 38,824 | 303 | 85.52% |
| 2018 | P148 Ayer Hitam | Wee Ka Siong (MCA) | 17,076 | 43.98% | Mardi Marwan (PAS) | 4,975 | 12.82% | 38,824 | 303 | 85.52% |
| 2022 | P148 Ayer Hitam | Wee Ka Siong (MCA) | 18,911 | 40.50% | Sheikh Umar Bagharib Ali (DAP) | 15,948 | 34.16% | 46,692 | 2,963 | 76.49% |
| 2022 | P148 Ayer Hitam | Wee Ka Siong (MCA) | 18,911 | 40.50% | Muhammad Syafiq A Aziz (BERSATU) | 11,833 | 25.34% | 46,692 | 2,963 | 76.49% |

== Honours ==
=== Honours of Malaysia ===
- Malaysia
  - Recipient of the 17th Yang di-Pertuan Agong Installation Medal (2024)
- Malacca
  - Grand Commander of the Exalted Order of Malacca (DGSM) – Datuk Seri (2015)
  - Companion Class I of the Exalted Order of Malacca (DMSM) – Datuk (2008)

== See also ==
- Ayer Hitam (federal constituency)

Political offices
| Preceded by Hon Choon Kim | Deputy Minister of Education; Serving with: Razali Ismail (2008–2009) and Mohd Puad Zarkashi (2009–2013); 2008–2013 | Succeeded by P. Kamalanathan |
| New title | Minister in the Prime Minister's Department; 2014–2018 | Position abolished |
| Preceded by Anthony Loke Siew Fook | Minister of Transport; 2020–2022 | Succeeded by Anthony Loke Siew Fook |
Party political offices
| Preceded by Liow Tiong Lai | Youth Chief of the Malaysian Chinese Association; 2008–2013 | Succeeded by Chong Sin Woon |
| Preceded by Liow Tiong Lai | Deputy President of the Malaysian Chinese Association; 2013–2018 | Succeeded by Mah Hang Soon |
| Preceded by Liow Tiong Lai | President of the Malaysian Chinese Association; 2018–present | Incumbent |
| Preceded by Liow Tiong Lai | Vice Chairman of Barisan Nasional; Serving with: Vigneswaran Sanasee and Joseph Kurup; 2018–present | Incumbent |
Parliament of Malaysia
| New constituency | Member of Parliament for Ayer Hitam; 2004–present | Incumbent |
