= Results of the 2013 Malaysian state elections by constituency =

Equal-area representation of the results with each hexagon representing one seat

These are the election results of the 2013 Malaysian general election by state constituency. State assembly elections were held in Malaysia on 5 May 2013 as part of the general elections. These members of the legislative assembly (MLAs) representing their constituency from the first sitting of respective state legislative assembly to its dissolution.

The state legislature election deposit was set at RM 5,000 per candidate. Similar to previous elections, the election deposit will be forfeited if the particular candidate had failed to secure at least 12.5% or one-eighth of the votes.

== Summary ==
Summary of the 2013 Malaysian Dewan Undangan Negeri election results ** Fraction of total popular votes in each state rounded to the nearest percent * Fraction of total seats in each state rounded to the nearest percent ± Change in number of seats from before the election
| State / federal territory | Barisan Nasional | | | | | Pakatan Rakyat | | | | | Independent and others | | | | | Total | |
| State / federal territory | Votes | ** | Seats | * | ± | Votes | ** | Seats | * | ± | Votes | ** | Seats | * | ± | Votes | Seats |
|---|---|---|---|---|---|---|---|---|---|---|---|---|---|---|---|---|---|
| Johor | 737,876 | 53.98% | 38 | 68% | 12 | 625,965 | 45.79% | 18 | 32% | 12 | 3,065 | 0.22% | 0 | 0% | 0 | 1,366,906 | 56 |
| Kedah | 449,278 | 50.37% | 21 | 58% | 7 | 434,621 | 48.73% | 15 | 42% | 6 | 7,993 | 0.90% | 0 | 0% | 1 | 891,892 | 36 |
| Kelantan | 343,416 | 44.62% | 12 | 27% | 5 | 425,291 | 55.26% | 33 | 73% | 5 | 888 | 0.12% | 0 | 0% | 0 | 769,595 | 45 |
| Malacca | 201,228 | 53.31% | 21 | 75% | 2 | 174,232 | 46.16% | 7 | 25% | 2 | 1,995 | 0.53% | 0 | 0% | 0 | 377,455 | 28 |
| Negeri Sembilan | 241,500 | 51.86% | 22 | 61% | 1 | 220,779 | 47.41% | 14 | 39% | 1 | 3,408 | 0.73% | 0 | 0% | 0 | 465,687 | 36 |
| Pahang | 330,868 | 54.09% | 30 | 71% | 8 | 270,230 | 44.18% | 12 | 29% | 8 | 10,607 | 1.73% | 0 | 0% | 0 | 611,705 | 42 |
| Penang | 233,305 | 32.09% | 10 | 25% | 1 | 490,739 | 67.50% | 30 | 75% | 1 | 2,959 | 0.41% | 0 | 0% | 0 | 727,003 | 40 |
| Perak | 506,947 | 44.40% | 31 | 53% | 3 | 625,710 | 54.80% | 28 | 47% | 1 | 9,122 | 0.80% | 0 | 0% | 4 | 1,141,779 | 59 |
| Perlis | 65,221 | 56.37% | 13 | 87% | 0 | 48,375 | 41.81% | 2 | 13% | 0 | 2,106 | 1.82% | 0 | 0% | 0 | 115,702 | 15 |
| Sabah | 428,634 | 55.67% | 48 | 80% | 9 | 248,187 | 32.23% | 11 | 18% | 10 | 93,157 | 12.10% | 1 | 2% | 1 | 769,978 | 60 |
| Selangor | 693,956 | 39.25% | 12 | 21% | 9 | 1,050,665 | 59.42% | 44 | 79% | 10 | 23,567 | 1.33% | 0 | 0% | 0 | 1,768,188 | 56 |
| Terengganu | 282,999 | 51.37% | 17 | 53% | 7 | 264,501 | 48.01% | 15 | 47% | 7 | 3,392 | 0.62% | 0 | 0% | 0 | 550,892 | 32 |
| Total | 4,513,997 | 47.26% | 275 | 54% | 32 | 4,879,699 | 51.09% | 229 | 45% | 41 | 157,968 | 1.65% | 1 | 0% | 7 | 9,551,664 | 505 |

== Perlis ==
For more details on Pelan dan Helaian Mata (Scoresheet) Bahagian Pilihan Raya Negeri Perlis, see footnote

| # | Constituency | Winner | Votes | Votes % | Opponent(s) | Votes | Votes % | Majority | Incumbent | Eligible voters | Malay voters | Chinese voters | Indian voters | Others voters | Voter turnout | Voter turnout % | Spoilt votes | Spoilt votes % |
|---|---|---|---|---|---|---|---|---|---|---|---|---|---|---|---|---|---|---|
| N01 | Titi Tinggi | Khaw Hock Kong (BN–MCA) | 3,925 | 51.9% | Teh Seng Chuan (PR–DAP) | 2,439 | 32.3% | 1,486 | Yip Sun Onn (BN–MCA) | 9,159 | 76% | 21% | 2% | | 7,556 | 82.5% | 224 | 2.4% |
| N01 | Titi Tinggi | Khaw Hock Kong (BN–MCA) | 3,925 | 51.9% | Yaacob Man (IND) | 968 | 12.8% | 1,486 | Yip Sun Onn (BN–MCA) | 9,159 | 76% | 21% | 2% | | 7,556 | 82.5% | 224 | 2.4% |
| N02 | Beseri | Mat Rawi Kassim (BN–UMNO) | 3,636 | 53.3% | Wan Kharizal Wan Khazim (PR–PAS) | 3,096 | 45.3% | 540 | Mat Rawi Kassim (BN–UMNO) | 8,197 | 78% | 20% | | 2% | 6,827 | 83.3% | 95 | 1.2% |
| N03 | Chuping | Asmaiza Ahmad (BN–UMNO) | 5,688 | 65.6% | Wan Mohamad Fishaal Wan Daud (PR–PKR) | 2,812 | 32.5% | 2,876 | Mansor Jusoh (BN–UMNO) | 9,848 | 86% | 2% | | 11% | 8,665 | 88.0% | 165 | 1.7% |
| N04 | Mata Ayer | Khairi Hasan (BN–UMNO) | 3,739 | 67.1% | Ammar Gazali (PR–PKR) | 1,750 | 31.4% | 1,989 | Khairi Hasan (BN–UMNO) | 6,365 | 91% | 3% | | 5% | 5,575 | 87.6% | 86 | 1.4% |
| N05 | Santan | Sabry Ahmad (BN–UMNO) | 4,209 | 56.7% | Mohd Anuar Mohd Tahir (PR–PAS) | 3,125 | 42.1% | 1,084 | Sabry Ahmad (BN–UMNO) | 8,405 | 99% | 1% | | | 7,427 | 88.4% | 93 | 1.1% |
| N06 | Bintong | Rela Ahmad (BN–UMNO) | 5,255 | 55.5% | Abd Jamil Kamis (PR–PAS) | 4,018 | 42.5% | 1,237 | Md Isa Sabu (BN–UMNO) | 10,911 | 96% | 3% | 1% | | 9,461 | 86.7% | 188 | 1.7% |
| N07 | Sena | Abdul Jamil Saad (BN–UMNO) | 5,418 | 57.6% | Tuan Marja Tuan Mat (PR–PKR) | 3,494 | 37.1% | 1,924 | Abdul Jamil Saad (BN–UMNO) | 11,194 | 86% | 9% | | 3% | 9,410 | 84.1% | 177 | 1.6% |
| N07 | Sena | Abdul Jamil Saad (BN–UMNO) | 5,418 | 57.6% | Ahmad Rizal Effande Zainol (IND) | 321 | 3.4% | 1,924 | Abdul Jamil Saad (BN–UMNO) | 11,194 | 86% | 9% | | 3% | 9,410 | 84.1% | 177 | 1.6% |
| N08 | Indera Kayangan | Chan Ming Kai (PR–PKR) | 4,263 | 53.4% | Por Choo Chor (BN–MCA) | 3,171 | 39.7% | 1,092 | Por Choo Chor (BN–MCA) | 9,776 | 48% | 47% | 4% | | 7,982 | 81.6% | 144 | 1.5% |
| N08 | Indera Kayangan | Chan Ming Kai (PR–PKR) | 4,263 | 53.4% | Ameir Hassan (IND) | 404 | 5.1% | 1,092 | Por Choo Chor (BN–MCA) | 9,776 | 48% | 47% | 4% | | 7,982 | 81.6% | 144 | 1.5% |
| N09 | Kuala Perlis | Mat Hassan (BN–UMNO) | 4,758 | 56.2% | Noor Amin Ahmad (PR–PKR) | 3,374 | 39.8% | 1,384 | Mat Hassan (BN–UMNO) | 10,150 | 78% | 21% | | 1% | 8,472 | 83.5% | 149 | 1.5% |
| N09 | Kuala Perlis | Mat Hassan (BN–UMNO) | 4,758 | 56.2% | Shaari Ludin (IND) | 191 | 2.3% | 1,384 | Mat Hassan (BN–UMNO) | 10,150 | 78% | 21% | | 1% | 8,472 | 83.5% | 149 | 1.5% |
| N10 | Kayang | Ahmad Bakri Ali (BN–UMNO) | 4,259 | 53.3% | Ya'akub Abu Seman (PR–PAS) | 3,595 | 45.0% | 664 | Ahmad Bakri Ali (BN–UMNO) | 9,176 | 96% | 2% | | 2% | 7,984 | 87.0% | 130 | 1.4% |
| N11 | Pauh | Azlan Man (BN–UMNO) | 4,769 | 57.4% | Idris Yaacob (PR–PAS) | 3,387 | 40.7% | 1,382 | Syed Razlan Putra Syed Jamalullail (BN–UMNO) | 9,594 | 77% | 16% | 6% | | 8,314 | 86.7% | 158 | 1.6% |
| N12 | Tambun Tulang | Ismail Kassim (BN–UMNO) | 5,286 | 64.1% | Azhar Ameir (PR–PKR) | 2,805 | 34.0% | 2,481 | Shahidan Kassim (BN–UMNO) | 9,424 | 84% | 4% | | 11% | 8,244 | 87.5% | 153 | 1.6% |
| N13 | Guar Sanji | Jafperi Othman (BN–UMNO) | 4,235 | 55.5% | Zulmi Sabri (PR–PAS) | 3,308 | 43.4% | 927 | Jafperi Othman (BN–UMNO) | 8,723 | 97% | 2% | | | 7,625 | 87.4% | 82 | 0.9% |
| N14 | Simpang Empat | Nurulhisham Yaakob (BN–UMNO) | 3,362 | 50.1% | Rus'sele Eizan (PR–PAS) | 3,277 | 48.8% | 85 | Rus'sele Eizan (PR–PAS) | 7,774 | 90% | 10% | | | 6,709 | 86.3% | 70 | 0.9% |
| N15 | Sanglang | Mohd. Shukri Ramli (PR–PAS) | 3,632 | 48.8% | Fathul Bari Mat Jahya (BN–UMNO) | 3,511 | 47.2% | 121 | Hashim Jasin (PR–PAS) | 8,361 | 92% | 8% | | | 7,445 | 89.0% | 80 | 1.0% |
| N15 | Sanglang | Mohd. Shukri Ramli (PR–PAS) | 3,632 | 48.8% | Zainudin Yom (IND) | 222 | 3.0% | 121 | Hashim Jasin (PR–PAS) | 8,361 | 92% | 8% | | | 7,445 | 89.0% | 80 | 1.0% |

== Kedah ==
For more details on Pelan dan Helaian Mata (Scoresheet) Bahagian Pilihan Raya Negeri Kedah, see footnote

| # | Constituency | Winner | Votes | Votes % | Opponent(s) | Votes | Votes % | Majority | Incumbent | Eligible voters | Malay voters | Chinese voters | Indian voters | Others voters | Voter turnout | Voter turnout % | Spoilt votes | Spoilt votes % |
|---|---|---|---|---|---|---|---|---|---|---|---|---|---|---|---|---|---|---|
| N01 | Ayer Hangat | Mohd Rawi Abdul Hamid (BN–UMNO) | 11,166 | 64.5% | Zubir Ahmad (PR–PAS) | 5,855 | 33.8% | 5,311 | Mohd Rawi Abdul Hamid (BN–UMNO) | 20,130 | 95% | 2% | 3% | | 17,313 | 86.0% | 292 | 1.5% |
| N02 | Kuah | Nor Saidi Nanyan (BN–UMNO) | 10,263 | 70.5% | Ahmad Kassim (PR–PKR) | 3,892 | 26.7% | 6,371 | Nawawi Ahmad (BN–UMNO) | 17,406 | 86% | 11% | 2% | | 14,563 | 83.7% | 291 | 1.7% |
| N02 | Kuah | Nor Saidi Nanyan (BN–UMNO) | 10,263 | 70.5% | Zaflee Pakwanteh (IND) | 117 | 0.8% | 6,371 | Nawawi Ahmad (BN–UMNO) | 17,406 | 86% | 11% | 2% | | 14,563 | 83.7% | 291 | 1.7% |
| N03 | Kota Siputeh | Abu Hasan Sarif (BN–UMNO) | 10,777 | 54.8% | Ismail Wan Teh (PR–PAS) | 8,539 | 43.4% | 2,238 | Abu Hasan Sarif (BN–UMNO) | 22,816 | 92% | 7% | | 1% | 19,682 | 86.3% | 366 | 1.6% |
| N04 | Ayer Hitam | Mukhriz Mahathir (BN–UMNO) | 14,083 | 54.0% | Abdul Ghani Ahmad (PR–PAS) | 11,637 | 44.6% | 2,446 | Abdul Ghani Ahmad (PR–PAS) | 29,567 | 90% | 8% | | 2% | 26,102 | 88.3% | 382 | 1.3% |
| N05 | Bukit Kayu Hitam | Ahmad Zaini Japar (BN–UMNO) | 16,454 | 64.5% | Nasrul Osmar Che Mansor (PR–PKR) | 8,581 | 33.6% | 7,873 | Ahmad Zaini Japar (BN–UMNO) | 29,228 | 89% | 8% | 2% | | 25,522 | 87.3% | 487 | 1.7% |
| N06 | Jitra | Aminuddin Omar (BN–UMNO) | 17,094 | 54.2% | Rohani Abd Muttalib (PR–PAS) | 14,038 | 44.5% | 3,056 | Saad Man (BN–UMNO) | 36,322 | 83% | 11% | 5% | | 31,526 | 86.8% | 394 | 1.1% |
| N07 | Kuala Nerang | Badrol Hisham Hashim (BN–UMNO) | 10,363 | 53.6% | Syed Ibrahim Syed Omar (PR–PAS) | 8,366 | 43.2% | 1,997 | Syed Sobri Syed Hashim (BN–UMNO) | 21,651 | 97% | 2% | | 1% | 19,344 | 89.3% | 380 | 1.8% |
| N07 | Kuala Nerang | Badrol Hisham Hashim (BN–UMNO) | 10,363 | 53.6% | Ahmad Mad. Daud (IND) | 235 | 1.2% | 1,997 | Syed Sobri Syed Hashim (BN–UMNO) | 21,651 | 97% | 2% | | 1% | 19,344 | 89.3% | 380 | 1.8% |
| N08 | Pedu | Kama Noriah Ibrahim (BN–UMNO) | 10,522 | 57.0% | Zamri Yusuf (PR–PKR) | 7,562 | 41.0% | 2,960 | Mahdzir Khalid (BN–UMNO) | 20,309 | 87% | 1% | | 12% | 18,460 | 90.9% | 376 | 1.9% |
| N09 | Bukit Lada | Ahmad Lebai Sudin (BN–UMNO) | 12,664 | 51.8% | Ahmad 'Izzat Mohamad Shauki (PR–PAS) | 11,340 | 46.4% | 1,324 | Ahmad 'Izzat Mohamad Shauki (PR–PAS) | 27,593 | 90% | 8% | 2% | | 24,463 | 88.7% | 459 | 1.7% |
| N10 | Bukit Pinang | Wan Romani Wan Salim (PR–PAS) | 12,152 | 53.1% | Mohd Mukhtar Noor (BN–UMNO) | 10,480 | 45.8% | 1,672 | Md Rohsidi Osman (PR–PAS) | 26,426 | 93% | 6% | 1% | | 22,890 | 86.6% | 258 | 1.0% |
| N11 | Derga | Tan Kok Yew (PR–DAP) | 10,358 | 47.2% | Cheah Soon Hai (BN–GERAKAN) | 9,202 | 43.3% | 1,156 | Cheah Soon Hai (BN–GERAKAN) | 26,695 | 56% | 39% | 4% | | 21,953 | 82.2% | 332 | 1.2% |
| N11 | Derga | Tan Kok Yew (PR–DAP) | 10,358 | 47.2% | Abdul Fisol Mohd Isa (BERJASA) | 2,061 | 9.4% | 1,156 | Cheah Soon Hai (BN–GERAKAN) | 26,695 | 56% | 39% | 4% | | 21,953 | 82.2% | 332 | 1.2% |
| N12 | Bakar Bata | Ahmad Bashah Md Hanipah (BN–UMNO) | 11,999 | 50.7% | Mohd Eekmal Ahmad (PR–PKR) | 11,104 | 46.9% | 895 | Ahmad Bashah Md Hanipah (BN–UMNO) | 28,186 | 68% | 27% | 5% | | 23,658 | 83.9% | 363 | 1.3% |
| N12 | Bakar Bata | Ahmad Bashah Md Hanipah (BN–UMNO) | 11,999 | 50.7% | Jawahar Raja Abdul Wahid (MUPP) | 192 | 0.8% | 895 | Ahmad Bashah Md Hanipah (BN–UMNO) | 28,186 | 68% | 27% | 5% | | 23,658 | 83.9% | 363 | 1.3% |
| N13 | Kota Darul Aman | Teoh Boon Kok @ Teoh Kai Kok (PR–DAP) | 7,387 | 59.5% | Loh Gim Hooi (BN–MCA) | 4,761 | 38.3% | 2,626 | Lee Guan Aik (PR–DAP) | 15,466 | 31% | 62% | 7% | | 12,416 | 80.3% | 202 | 1.3% |
| N13 | Kota Darul Aman | Teoh Boon Kok @ Teoh Kai Kok (PR–DAP) | 7,387 | 59.5% | Liew Kard Seong (IND) | 39 | 0.3% | 2,626 | Lee Guan Aik (PR–DAP) | 15,466 | 31% | 62% | 7% | | 12,416 | 80.3% | 202 | 1.3% |
| N13 | Kota Darul Aman | Teoh Boon Kok @ Teoh Kai Kok (PR–DAP) | 7,387 | 59.5% | Jayagopal Adaikkalam (IND) | 27 | 0.2% | 2,626 | Lee Guan Aik (PR–DAP) | 15,466 | 31% | 62% | 7% | | 12,416 | 80.3% | 202 | 1.3% |
| N14 | Alor Mengkudu | Ahmad Saad @ Yahaya (PR–PAS) | 11,453 | 52.9% | Sharifah Maznah Syed Kassim Barakbah (BN–UMNO) | 9,588 | 44.3% | 1,865 | Ismail Salleh (PR–PAS) | 25,357 | 73% | 24% | 3% | | 21,639 | 85.3% | 273 | 1.1% |
| N14 | Alor Mengkudu | Ahmad Saad @ Yahaya (PR–PAS) | 11,453 | 52.9% | Fadzil Hanafi (IND) | 325 | 1.5% | 1,865 | Ismail Salleh (PR–PAS) | 25,357 | 73% | 24% | 3% | | 21,639 | 85.3% | 273 | 1.1% |
| N15 | Anak Bukit | Amiruddin Hamzah (PR–PAS) | 13,822 | 54.8% | Hashim Jahaya (BN–UMNO) | 11,016 | 43.7% | 2,806 | Amiruddin Hamzah (PR–PAS) | 28,981 | 88% | 11% | 1% | | 25,214 | 87.0% | 291 | 1.0% |
| N15 | Anak Bukit | Amiruddin Hamzah (PR–PAS) | 13,822 | 54.8% | Abd Samat Che Noh (IND) | 85 | 0.3% | 2,806 | Amiruddin Hamzah (PR–PAS) | 28,981 | 88% | 11% | 1% | | 25,214 | 87.0% | 291 | 1.0% |
| N16 | Kubang Rotan | Mohd Nasir Mustafa (PR–PAS) | 15,013 | 51.2% | Latt Shariman Abdullah (BN–UMNO) | 13,969 | 47.6% | 1,044 | Mohd Nasir Mustafa (PR–PAS) | 34,559 | 71% | 27% | 1% | | 29,317 | 84.8% | 335 | 1.0% |
| N17 | Pengkalan Kundor | Phahrolrazi Zawawi (PR–PAS) | 15,526 | 56.5% | Noor Hasita Mat Isa (BN–UMNO) | 11,642 | 42.4% | 3,884 | Phahrolrazi Zawawi (PR–PAS) | 31,788 | 76% | 23% | 1% | | 27,482 | 86.5% | 314 | 1.0% |
| N18 | Tokai | Mohamed Taulan Mat Rasul (PR–PAS) | 18,005 | 58.7% | Najmuddin Darus (BN–UMNO) | 12,172 | 39.7% | 5,833 | Mohamed Taulan Mat Rasul (PR–PAS) | 34,623 | 91% | 9% | | | 30,677 | 88.6% | 364 | 1.1% |
| N18 | Tokai | Mohamed Taulan Mat Rasul (PR–PAS) | 18,005 | 58.7% | Abu Bakar Abdullah (IND) | 136 | 0.4% | 5,833 | Mohamed Taulan Mat Rasul (PR–PAS) | 34,623 | 91% | 9% | | | 30,677 | 88.6% | 364 | 1.1% |
| N19 | Sungai Tiang | Suraya Yaacob (BN–UMNO) | 18,929 | 59.6% | Fadzil Baharum (PR–PAS) | 11,935 | 37.6% | 6,994 | Suraya Yaacob (BN–UMNO) | 35,512 | 86% | 2% | | 11% | 31,772 | 89.5% | 577 | 1.6% |
| N19 | Sungai Tiang | Suraya Yaacob (BN–UMNO) | 18,929 | 59.6% | Rosli Omar (IND) | 192 | 0.6% | 6,994 | Suraya Yaacob (BN–UMNO) | 35,512 | 86% | 2% | | 11% | 31,772 | 89.5% | 577 | 1.6% |
| N19 | Sungai Tiang | Suraya Yaacob (BN–UMNO) | 18,929 | 59.6% | Charean Isen (KITA) | 139 | 0.4% | 6,994 | Suraya Yaacob (BN–UMNO) | 35,512 | 86% | 2% | | 11% | 31,772 | 89.5% | 577 | 1.6% |
| N20 | Sungai Limau | Azizan Abdul Razak (PR–PAS) | 13,294 | 54.6% | Mohd Fazillah Mohd Ali (BN–UMNO) | 10,520 | 43.2% | 2,774 | Azizan Abdul Razak (PR–PAS) | 27,287 | 93% | 7% | | | 24,349 | 89.2% | 351 | 1.3% |
| N20 | Sungai Limau | Azizan Abdul Razak (PR–PAS) | 13,294 | 54.6% | Sobri Ahmad (IND) | 100 | 0.4% | 2,774 | Azizan Abdul Razak (PR–PAS) | 27,287 | 93% | 7% | | | 24,349 | 89.2% | 351 | 1.3% |
| N20 | Sungai Limau | Azizan Abdul Razak (PR–PAS) | 13,294 | 54.6% | Abdullah Hashim (IND) | 84 | 0.3% | 2,774 | Azizan Abdul Razak (PR–PAS) | 27,287 | 93% | 7% | | | 24,349 | 89.2% | 351 | 1.3% |
| N21 | Guar Chempedak | Ku Abd Rahman Ku Ismail (BN–UMNO) | 10,158 | 55.7% | Musoddak Ahmad (PR–PAS) | 7,860 | 43.1% | 2,298 | Ku Abd Rahman Ku Ismail (BN–UMNO) | 21,086 | 88% | 11% | 1% | | 18,244 | 86.5% | 226 | 1.1% |
| N22 | Gurun | Leong Yong Kong (BN–MCA) | 11,411 | 51.8% | Salma Ismail (PR–PKR) | 10,115 | 45.9% | 1,296 | Leong Yong Kong (BN–MCA) | 26,037 | 56% | 27% | 17% | | 22,018 | 84.6% | 492 | 1.9% |
| N23 | Belantek | Mohd Tajuddin Abdullah (BN–UMNO) | 9,822 | 51.5% | Abu Bakar Bakilani Abu Hassan (PR–PAS) | 8,980 | 47.1% | 842 | Mohd Tajuddin Abdullah (BN–UMNO) | 21,200 | 93% | 2% | | 5% | 19,063 | 89.9% | 261 | 1.2% |
| N24 | Jeneri | Mahadzir Abdul Hamid (BN–UMNO) | 12,318 | 53.7% | Ahmad Tarmizi Sulaiman (PR–PAS) | 10,258 | 44.7% | 2,060 | Yahya Abdullah (PR–PAS) | 25,586 | 92% | 1% | | 6% | 22,927 | 89.6% | 351 | 1.4% |
| N25 | Bukit Selambau | Krishnamoorthy Rajannaidu (PR–PKR) | 20,091 | 48.0% | Maran Mutaya (BN–MIC) | 19,561 | 46.7% | 530 | Manikumar Subramaniam (PR–PKR) | 49,087 | 53% | 20% | 26% | | 41,898 | 85.4% | 839 | 1.7% |
| N25 | Bukit Selambau | Krishnamoorthy Rajannaidu (PR–PKR) | 20,091 | 48.0% | Syed Omar Syed Mahamud (IND) | 936 | 2.2% | 530 | Manikumar Subramaniam (PR–PKR) | 49,087 | 53% | 20% | 26% | | 41,898 | 85.4% | 839 | 1.7% |
| N25 | Bukit Selambau | Krishnamoorthy Rajannaidu (PR–PKR) | 20,091 | 48.0% | Kamal Nasser Thow Beek (IND) | 388 | 0.9% | 530 | Manikumar Subramaniam (PR–PKR) | 49,087 | 53% | 20% | 26% | | 41,898 | 85.4% | 839 | 1.7% |
| N25 | Bukit Selambau | Krishnamoorthy Rajannaidu (PR–PKR) | 20,091 | 48.0% | Thivagaran Supramany (IND) | 83 | 0.2% | 530 | Manikumar Subramaniam (PR–PKR) | 49,087 | 53% | 20% | 26% | | 41,898 | 85.4% | 839 | 1.7% |
| N26 | Tanjong Dawai | Tajul Urus Mat Zain (BN–UMNO) | 17,818 | 55.0% | Ahmad Fakhruddin Fakhrurazi (PR–PAS) | 14,038 | 43.8% | 3,780 | Hamdan Mohamed Khalib (PR–PAS) | 36,821 | 80% | 13% | 6% | | 32,402 | 88.0% | 546 | 1.5% |
| N27 | Pantai Merdeka | Ali Yahaya (BN–UMNO) | 15,393 | 51.8% | Abdullah Jusoh (PR–PAS) | 13,686 | 46.1% | 1,707 | Abdullah Jusoh (PR–PAS) | 33,282 | 92% | 6% | 2% | | 29,709 | 89.3% | 314 | 0.9% |
| N27 | Pantai Merdeka | Ali Yahaya (BN–UMNO) | 15,393 | 51.8% | Mohd Yusuf Lazim (IND) | 316 | 1.1% | 1,707 | Abdullah Jusoh (PR–PAS) | 33,282 | 92% | 6% | 2% | | 29,709 | 89.3% | 314 | 0.9% |
| N28 | Bakar Arang | Simon Ooi Tze Min (PR–PKR) | 17,757 | 60.1% | Lee Yean Yang (BN–MCA) | 11,223 | 38.0% | 6,534 | Tan Wei Shu (IND) | 34,743 | 43% | 42% | 15% | | 29,550 | 85.1% | 366 | 1.1% |
| N28 | Bakar Arang | Simon Ooi Tze Min (PR–PKR) | 17,757 | 60.1% | Ong Kah Soon (IND) | 204 | 0.7% | 6,534 | Tan Wei Shu (IND) | 34,743 | 43% | 42% | 15% | | 29,550 | 85.1% | 366 | 1.1% |
| N29 | Sidam | Robert Ling Kui Ee (PR–PKR) | 13,189 | 61.3% | Bee Sieong Heng (BN–GERAKAN) | 7,225 | 33.6% | 5,964 | Tan Joon Long @ Tan Chow Kang (PR–PKR) | 25,151 | 38% | 41% | 21% | | 21,513 | 85.5% | 245 | 1.0% |
| N29 | Sidam | Robert Ling Kui Ee (PR–PKR) | 13,189 | 61.3% | Zamil Ibrahim (IND) | 347 | 1.6% | 5,964 | Tan Joon Long @ Tan Chow Kang (PR–PKR) | 25,151 | 38% | 41% | 21% | | 21,513 | 85.5% | 245 | 1.0% |
| N29 | Sidam | Robert Ling Kui Ee (PR–PKR) | 13,189 | 61.3% | Ooi Beng Kooi (IND) | 268 | 1.2% | 5,964 | Tan Joon Long @ Tan Chow Kang (PR–PKR) | 25,151 | 38% | 41% | 21% | | 21,513 | 85.5% | 245 | 1.0% |
| N29 | Sidam | Robert Ling Kui Ee (PR–PKR) | 13,189 | 61.3% | Tan Hock Huat (IND) | 197 | 0.9% | 5,964 | Tan Joon Long @ Tan Chow Kang (PR–PKR) | 25,151 | 38% | 41% | 21% | | 21,513 | 85.5% | 245 | 1.0% |
| N29 | Sidam | Robert Ling Kui Ee (PR–PKR) | 13,189 | 61.3% | Uh Chorng Von (KITA) | 42 | 0.2% | 5,964 | Tan Joon Long @ Tan Chow Kang (PR–PKR) | 25,151 | 38% | 41% | 21% | | 21,513 | 85.5% | 245 | 1.0% |
| N30 | Bayu | Azmi Che Husain (BN–UMNO) | 17,240 | 56.0% | Mahmud Yaakob (PR–PAS) | 13,108 | 42.6% | 4,132 | Azmi Che Husain (BN–UMNO) | 34,570 | 93% | 4% | | 2% | 30,778 | 89.0% | 430 | 1.2% |
| N31 | Kupang | Harun Abdul Aziz (BN–UMNO) | 14,427 | 52.9% | Johari Abdullah (PR–PAS) | 12,503 | 45.8% | 1,924 | Johari Abdullah (PR–PAS) | 30,511 | 91% | 4% | 3% | | 27,270 | 89.4% | 340 | 1.1% |
| N32 | Kuala Ketil | Md Zuki Yusof (PR–PAS) | 12,769 | 51.4% | Mohd Khairul Azhar Abdullah (BN–UMNO) | 11,615 | 46.7% | 1,154 | Md Zuki Yusof (PR–PAS) | 28,087 | 82% | 7% | 11% | | 24,858 | 88.6% | 369 | 1.5% |
| N32 | Kuala Ketil | Md Zuki Yusof (PR–PAS) | 12,769 | 51.4% | Krishnan Ganapathy (KITA) | 105 | 0.4% | 1,154 | Md Zuki Yusof (PR–PAS) | 28,087 | 82% | 7% | 11% | | 24,858 | 88.6% | 369 | 1.5% |
| N33 | Merbau Pulas | Siti Aishah Ghazali (PR–PAS) | 14,705 | 50.2% | Marlia Abd Latiff (BN–UMNO) | 14,072 | 48.1% | 633 | Siti Aishah Ghazali (PR–PAS) | 33,597 | 67% | 13% | 19% | | 29,280 | 87.2% | 503 | 1.5% |
| N34 | Lunas | Azman Nasruddin (PR–PKR) | 21,670 | 61.7% | Ananthan Somasundaram (BN–MIC) | 12,586 | 35.8% | 9,084 | Mohd Razhi Salleh (PR–PKR) | 40,498 | 46% | 28% | 25% | | 35,125 | 86.7% | 392 | 1.0% |
| N34 | Lunas | Azman Nasruddin (PR–PKR) | 21,670 | 61.7% | Vasanthi Ramalingam (IND) | 406 | 1.2% | 9,084 | Mohd Razhi Salleh (PR–PKR) | 40,498 | 46% | 28% | 25% | | 35,125 | 86.7% | 392 | 1.0% |
| N34 | Lunas | Azman Nasruddin (PR–PKR) | 21,670 | 61.7% | Prebakarran Narayanan Nair (KITA) | 71 | 0.2% | 9,084 | Mohd Razhi Salleh (PR–PKR) | 40,498 | 46% | 28% | 25% | | 35,125 | 86.7% | 392 | 1.0% |
| N35 | Kulim | Chua Thiong Gee (BN–MCA) | 14,384 | 48.7% | Chu Maw Nian (PR–PKR) | 13,741 | 46.5% | 643 | Lim Soo Nee (PR–PKR) | 34,404 | 60% | 22% | 17% | | 29,519 | 85.8% | 496 | 1.4% |
| N35 | Kulim | Chua Thiong Gee (BN–MCA) | 14,384 | 48.7% | Mohd Junip Huzayin (BERJASA) | 898 | 3.0% | 643 | Lim Soo Nee (PR–PKR) | 34,404 | 60% | 22% | 17% | | 29,519 | 85.8% | 496 | 1.4% |
| N36 | Bandar Baharu | Norsabrina Mohd. Noor (BN–UMNO) | 12,361 | 53.7% | Mohd Khari Mohd Salleh (PR–PAS) | 10,292 | 44.7% | 2,069 | Yaakub Hussin (PR–PAS) | 26,506 | 78% | 15% | 7% | | 23,012 | 86.8% | 359 | 1.4% |

== Kelantan ==
For more details on Pelan dan Helaian Mata (Scoresheet) Bahagian Pilihan Raya Negeri Kelantan, see footnote

| # | Constituency | Winner | Votes | Votes % | Opponent(s) | Votes | Votes % | Majority | Incumbent | Eligible voters | Malay voters | Chinese voters | Indian voters | Others voters | Voter turnout | Voter turnout % | Spoilt votes | Spoilt votes % |
|---|---|---|---|---|---|---|---|---|---|---|---|---|---|---|---|---|---|---|
| N01 | Pengkalan Kubor | Noor Zahidi Omar (BN–UMNO) | 10,174 | 53.5% | Saharun Ibrahim (PR–PKR) | 8,438 | 44.4% | 1,736 | Noor Zahidi Omar (BN–UMNO) | 24,097 | 92% | 1% | | 7% | 19,021 | 78.9% | 344 | 1.4% |
| N01 | Pengkalan Kubor | Noor Zahidi Omar (BN–UMNO) | 10,174 | 53.5% | Izat Bukhary Ismail Bukhary (IND) | 65 | 0.3% | 1,736 | Noor Zahidi Omar (BN–UMNO) | 24,097 | 92% | 1% | | 7% | 19,021 | 78.9% | 344 | 1.4% |
| N02 | Kelaboran | Mohamad Zaki Ibrahim (PR–PAS) | 10,098 | 54.9% | Wan Hanapi Wan Yaacob (BN–UMNO) | 7,995 | 43.5% | 2,103 | Mohamad Zaki Ibrahim (PR–PAS) | 22,180 | 89% | 3% | | 8% | 18,393 | 82.9% | 300 | 1.4% |
| N03 | Pasir Pekan | Ahmad Yaakob (PR–PAS) | 14,204 | 61.6% | Nik Noriza Nik Salleh (BN–UMNO) | 8,560 | 37.1% | 5,644 | Ahmad Yaakob (PR–PAS) | 26,854 | 99% | 1% | | | 23,053 | 85.8% | 289 | 1.1% |
| N04 | Wakaf Bharu | Che Abdullah Mat Nawi (PR–PAS) | 11,515 | 51.6% | Mohd Rosdi Ab Aziz (BN–UMNO) | 10,537 | 47.2% | 978 | Che Abdullah Mat Nawi (PR–PAS) | 25,501 | 90% | 8% | | 2% | 22,309 | 87.5% | 257 | 1.0% |
| N05 | Kijang | Wan Ubaidah Omar (PR–PAS) | 10,632 | 65.1% | Zaluzi Sulaiman (BN–UMNO) | 5,489 | 33.6% | 5,143 | Wan Ubaidah Omar (PR–PAS) | 19,329 | 97% | 3% | | | 16,325 | 84.5% | 204 | 1.1% |
| N06 | Chempaka | Nik Abdul Aziz Nik Mat (PR–PAS) | 12,310 | 67.1% | Wan Razman Wan Abd Razak (BN–UMNO) | 5,810 | 31.7% | 6,500 | Nik Abdul Aziz Nik Mat (PR–PAS) | 21,364 | 99% | 1% | | | 18,357 | 85.9% | 237 | 1.1% |
| N07 | Panchor | Nik Mohd. Amar Nik Abdullah (PR–PAS) | 12,467 | 62.0% | Che Rosli Hassan (BN–UMNO) | 7,431 | 37.0% | 5,036 | Mohd Amar Abdullah (PR–PAS) | 23,716 | 98% | 1% | | | 20,107 | 84.8% | 209 | 0.9% |
| N08 | Tanjong Mas | Rohani Ibrahim (PR–PAS) | 15,387 | 68.5% | Kanidy Omar (BN–UMNO) | 6,866 | 30.6% | 8,521 | Rohani Ibrahim (PR–PAS) | 27,514 | 93% | 7% | | | 22,451 | 81.6% | 198 | 0.7% |
| N09 | Kota Lama | Anuar Tan Abdullah (PR–PAS) | 14,269 | 63.9% | Tan Ken Ten (BN–MCA) | 7,651 | 34.2% | 6,618 | Anuar Tan Abdullah (PR–PAS) | 28,248 | 64% | 34% | 2% | | 22,347 | 79.1% | 275 | 1.0% |
| N09 | Kota Lama | Anuar Tan Abdullah (PR–PAS) | 14,269 | 63.9% | Mohd Zakiman Abu Bakar (IND) | 152 | 0.7% | 6,618 | Anuar Tan Abdullah (PR–PAS) | 28,248 | 64% | 34% | 2% | | 22,347 | 79.1% | 275 | 1.0% |
| N10 | Bunut Payong | Ramli Mamat (PR–PAS) | 13,447 | 63.2% | Mohd Fakhrurazi Abdul Rahim (BN–UMNO) | 7,655 | 36.0% | 5,792 | Takiyuddin Hassan (PR–PAS) | 25,506 | 94% | 6% | 1% | | 21,291 | 83.5% | 189 | 0.7% |
| N11 | Tendong | Rozi Muhamad (PR–PAS) | 9,397 | 52.0% | Hanafi Mamat (BN–UMNO) | 8,419 | 46.6% | 978 | Muhammad Md Daud (PR–PAS) | 21,281 | 98% | 2% | | | 18,083 | 85.0% | 267 | 1.3% |
| N12 | Pengkalan Pasir | Hanifa Ahmad (PR–PAS) | 13,398 | 59.9% | Tuan Anuwa Tuan Mat (BN–UMNO) | 8,683 | 38.8% | 4,715 | Hanifa Ahmad (PR–PAS) | 27,327 | 96% | 4% | | | 22,359 | 81.8% | 278 | 1.0% |
| N13 | Chetok | Abdul Halim Abdul Rahman (PR–PAS) | 10,578 | 54.3% | Aimi Jusoh (BN–UMNO) | 8,593 | 44.1% | 1,985 | Abdul Halim Abdul Rahman (PR–PAS) | 23,357 | 96% | 4% | | | 19,475 | 83.4% | 304 | 1.3% |
| N14 | Meranti | Mohd. Nassuruddin Daud (PR–PAS) | 8,522 | 64.1% | Mohd Afandi Yusoff (BN–UMNO) | 4,589 | 34.5% | 3,933 | Mohd Nassuruddin Daud (PR–PAS) | 16,528 | 99% | | | 1% | 13,305 | 80.5% | 194 | 1.2% |
| N15 | Gual Periok | Mohamad Awang (PR–PAS) | 8,224 | 51.2% | Shaari Mat Hussain (BN–UMNO) | 7,609 | 47.3% | 615 | Mohamad Awang (PR–PAS) | 21,387 | 98% | 1% | | 1% | 16,073 | 75.2% | 240 | 1.1% |
| N16 | Bukit Tuku | Abdul Rasul Mohamed (PR–PAS) | 6,569 | 52.8% | Mohd Zain Ismail (BN–UMNO) | 5,690 | 45.7% | 879 | Abdul Fatah Harun (PR–PAS) | 14,988 | 98% | | | 2% | 12,438 | 83.0% | 179 | 1.2% |
| N17 | Salor | Husam Musa (PR–PAS) | 10,231 | 60.3% | Mohd Noordin Awang (BN–UMNO) | 6,548 | 38.6% | 3,683 | Husam Musa (PR–PAS) | 20,011 | 98% | 2% | | | 16,975 | 84.8% | 196 | 1.0% |
| N18 | Pasir Tumboh | Abd Rahman Yunus (PR–PAS) | 9,972 | 63.9% | Mohd Syamsul Mohd Yusoff (BN–UMNO) | 5,471 | 35.0% | 4,501 | Ahmad Baihaki Atiqullah (PR–PAS) | 18,518 | 99% | 1% | | | 15,613 | 84.3% | 170 | 0.9% |
| N19 | Demit | Mumtaz Md. Nawi (PR–PAS) | 15,302 | 68.6% | Wan Mohd Nazi Wan Hamat (BN–UMNO) | 6,721 | 30.1% | 8,581 | Muhammad Mustafa (PR–PAS) | 26,861 | 97% | 2% | | | 22,310 | 83.1% | 287 | 1.1% |
| N20 | Tawang | Hassan Mohamood (PR–PAS) | 13,563 | 55.8% | Mohd Zain Yasim (BN–UMNO) | 10,451 | 43.0% | 3,112 | Hassan Mohamood (PR–PAS) | 27,585 | 99% | 1% | | | 24,303 | 88.1% | 289 | 1.0% |
| N21 | Perupok | Mohd Huzaimy Che Husin (PR–PAS) | 12,370 | 52.4% | Muhammad Zaidi Sidek (BN–UMNO) | 10,882 | 46.1% | 1,488 | Omar Mohammed (PR–PAS) | 26,913 | 98% | 2% | | | 23,589 | 87.6% | 337 | 1.3% |
| N22 | Jelawat | Abdul Azziz Kadir (PR–PAS) | 11,722 | 49.5% | Ilias Husain (BN–UMNO) | 11,620 | 49.0% | 102 | Abdul Azziz Kadir (PR–PAS) | 27,068 | 99% | 1% | | | 23,691 | 87.5% | 349 | 1.3% |
| N23 | Melor | Md Yusnan Yusof (PR–PAS) | 10,590 | 55.8% | Mohamed Othman Omar (BN–UMNO) | 8,101 | 42.7% | 2,489 | Wan Ismail Wan Jusoh (PR–PAS) | 22,094 | 97% | 2% | | 1% | 18,963 | 85.8% | 272 | 1.2% |
| N24 | Kadok | Azami Md. Nor (PR–PAS) | 8,753 | 59.7% | Mohamad Basri Awang (BN–UMNO) | 5,656 | 38.6% | 3,097 | Azami Md Nor (PR–PAS) | 17,107 | 98% | 2% | | | 14,654 | 85.4% | 245 | 1.2% |
| N25 | Kok Lanas | Md Alwi Che Ahmad (BN–UMNO) | 10,040 | 49.9% | Nik Mahadi Nik Mahmood (PR–PAS) | 9,871 | 49.1% | 169 | Md Alwi Che Ahmad (BN–UMNO) | 23,016 | 96% | 2% | | 3% | 20,109 | 87.4% | 198 | 0.9% |
| N26 | Bukit Panau | Abdul Fattah Mahmood (PR–PAS) | 13,292 | 57.5% | Baharudin Yusof (BN–UMNO) | 9,552 | 41.3% | 3,740 | Abdul Fatah Mahmood (PR–PAS) | 27,405 | 91% | 8% | | 1% | 23,103 | 84.3% | 259 | 0.9% |
| N27 | Gual Ipoh | Bakri Mustapha (BN–UMNO) | 7,689 | 54.3% | Wan Yusoff Wan Mustapha (PR–PAS) | 6,285 | 44.4% | 1,404 | Wan Yusoff Wan Mustafa (PR–PAS) | 16,423 | 97% | 1% | 2% | | 14,156 | 86.2% | 182 | 1.1% |
| N28 | Kemahang | Md. Anizam Ab. Rahman (PR–PAS) | 6,953 | 55.1% | Dyg Saniah Awg Hamid (BN–UMNO) | 5,517 | 43.8% | 1,436 | Md Anizam Ab Rahman (PR–PAS) | 14,409 | 99% | | | 1% | 12,608 | 87.5% | 138 | 1.0% |
| N29 | Selising | Zulkifle Ali (BN–UMNO) | 7,662 | 49.2% | Saipul Bahrim Mohamad (PR–PAS) | 7,555 | 48.5% | 107 | Saipul Bahrin Mohamad (PR–PAS) | 18,058 | 99% | 1% | | | 15,573 | 86.2% | 236 | 1.3% |
| N29 | Selising | Zulkifle Ali (BN–UMNO) | 7,662 | 49.2% | Ibrahim Ismail (IND) | 120 | 0.8% | 107 | Saipul Bahrin Mohamad (PR–PAS) | 18,058 | 99% | 1% | | | 15,573 | 86.2% | 236 | 1.3% |
| N30 | Limbongan | Mohd Nazlan Mohamed Hasbullah (PR–PAS) | 10,480 | 51.9% | Mohd Rujhan Salleh (BN–UMNO) | 9,438 | 46.8% | 1,042 | Zainuddin Awang Hamat (PR–PAS) | 23,827 | 97% | 2% | | 1% | 20,178 | 84.7% | 260 | 1.1% |
| N31 | Semerak | Zawawi Othman (BN–UMNO) | 8,444 | 52.5% | Wan Hassan Wan Ibrahim (PR–PAS) | 7,459 | 46.4% | 985 | Wan Hassan Wan Ibrahim (PR–PAS) | 18,269 | 98% | | | 2% | 16,092 | 88.1% | 189 | 1.0% |
| N32 | Gaal | Tuan Mazlan Tuan Mat (PR–PAS) | 7,178 | 50.5% | Redzuan Stapha (BN–UMNO) | 6,876 | 48.4% | 302 | Nik Mazian Nik Mohamad (PR–PAS) | 16,105 | 99% | | | 1% | 14,203 | 88.2% | 149 | 0.9% |
| N33 | Pulai Chondong | Zulkifli Mamat (PR–PAS) | 8,546 | 52.3% | Halim Ismail (BN–UMNO) | 7,627 | 46.6% | 919 | Zulkifli Mamat (PR–PAS) | 18,875 | 97% | 3% | | | 16,352 | 86.6% | 179 | 0.9% |
| N34 | Temangan | Mohamed Fadzli Hassan (PR–PAS) | 8,258 | 52.9% | Azemi Mat Zin (BN–UMNO) | 7,173 | 46.0% | 1,085 | Mohamed Fadzli Hassan (PR–PAS) | 17,966 | 95% | 5% | | | 15,598 | 86.8% | 167 | 0.9% |
| N35 | Kemuning | Mohd Roseli Ismail (PR–PAS) | 10,049 | 52.1% | Eriandi Ismail (BN–UMNO) | 9,015 | 46.7% | 1,034 | Wan Ahmad Lutfi Wan Sulaiman (PR–PAS) | 22,385 | 97% | 3% | | | 19,292 | 86.2% | 228 | 1.0% |
| N36 | Bukit Bunga | Mohd Adhan Kechik (BN–UMNO) | 7,692 | 54.8% | Sufely Abd Razak (PR–PAS) | 6,159 | 43.9% | 1,533 | Mohd Adhan Kechik (BN–UMNO) | 16,609 | 99% | | | 1% | 14,027 | 84.5% | 176 | 1.1% |
| N37 | Air Lanas | Mustapa Mohamed (BN–UMNO) | 6,605 | 49.6% | Abdullah Ya'kub (PR–PAS) | 6,558 | 49.2% | 47 | Abdullah Ya'kub (PR–PAS) | 15,007 | 98% | | | 1% | 13,329 | 88.8% | 166 | 1.1% |
| N38 | Kuala Balah | Abdul Aziz Derashid (BN–UMNO) | 6,173 | 59.2% | Ramlan Mat (PR–PKR) | 4,097 | 39.3% | 2,076 | Abdul Aziz Derashid (BN–UMNO) | 11,608 | 99% | | | 1% | 10,431 | 89.9% | 161 | 1.4% |
| N39 | Mengkebang | Abdul Latiff Abdul Rahman (PR–PAS) | 8,235 | 52.7% | Azizzuddin Hussein (BN–UMNO) | 7,163 | 45.9% | 1,072 | Abdul Latiff Abdul Rahman (PR–PAS) | 17,674 | 96% | 3% | 2% | | 15,619 | 88.4% | 221 | 1.3% |
| N40 | Guchil | Mohd Roslan Puteh (PR–PKR) | 7,803 | 49.9% | Nik Sapeia Nik Yusof (BN–PPP) | 7,311 | 46.8% | 492 | Tuan Zamri Ariff Tuan Zakaria (PR–PKR) | 19,088 | 85% | 12% | 3% | | 15,629 | 81.9% | 332 | 1.7% |
| N40 | Guchil | Mohd Roslan Puteh (PR–PKR) | 7,803 | 49.9% | Muhamad Bustaman Yaacob (IND) | 146 | 0.9% | 492 | Tuan Zamri Ariff Tuan Zakaria (PR–PKR) | 19,088 | 85% | 12% | 3% | | 15,629 | 81.9% | 332 | 1.7% |
| N40 | Guchil | Mohd Roslan Puteh (PR–PKR) | 7,803 | 49.9% | Md Nasir Ahmad (IND) | 37 | 0.2% | 492 | Tuan Zamri Ariff Tuan Zakaria (PR–PKR) | 19,088 | 85% | 12% | 3% | | 15,629 | 81.9% | 332 | 1.7% |
| N41 | Manek Urai | Mohd Fauzi Abdullah (PR–PAS) | 7,802 | 55.2% | Che Jalal Muda (BN–UMNO) | 6,169 | 43.7% | 1,633 | Mohd Fauzi Abdullah (PR–PAS) | 15,879 | 100% | | | | 14,131 | 88.9% | 160 | 0.9% |
| N42 | Dabong | Ramzi Ab Rahman (BN–UMNO) | 4,612 | 50.5% | Ku Mohd Zaki Ku Hussin (PR–PAS) | 4,383 | 48.0% | 229 | Arifabillah Mohd Asri Ibrahim (PR–PAS) | 10,460 | 99% | | | | 9,133 | 87.3% | 138 | 1.3% |
| N43 | Nenggiri | Mat Yusoff Abdul Ghani (BN–UMNO) | 6,654 | 65.7% | Mohammad Azihan Che Seman (PR–PKR) | 2,805 | 27.7% | 3,849 | Mat Yusoff Abdul Ghani (BN–UMNO) | 11,572 | 81% | | | 19% | 10,133 | 87.6% | 306 | 2.6% |
| N43 | Nenggiri | Mat Yusoff Abdul Ghani (BN–UMNO) | 6,654 | 65.7% | Abdul Aziz Mohamed (IND) | 368 | 3.6% | 3,849 | Mat Yusoff Abdul Ghani (BN–UMNO) | 11,572 | 81% | | | 19% | 10,133 | 87.6% | 306 | 2.6% |
| N44 | Paloh | Nozula Mat Diah (BN–UMNO) | 7,847 | 65.3% | Amran Abdul Ghani (PR–PKR) | 3,910 | 32.5% | 3,937 | Nozula Mat Diah (BN–UMNO) | 13,642 | 99% | | | | 12,017 | 88.1% | 260 | 1.9% |
| N45 | Galas | Abdul Aziz Yusoff (BN–UMNO) | 6,956 | 54.0% | Abdullah Hussein (PR–PAS) | 5,655 | 43.9% | 1,301 | Abdul Aziz Yusoff (BN–UMNO) | 14,962 | 64% | 18% | | 17% | 12,884 | 86.1% | 273 | 1.8% |

== Terengganu ==
For more details on Pelan dan Helaian Mata (Scoresheet) Bahagian Pilihan Raya Negeri Terengganu, see footnote

| # | Constituency | Winner | Votes | Votes % | Opponent(s) | Votes | Votes % | Majority | Incumbent | Eligible voters | Malay voters | Chinese voters | Indian voters | Others voters | Voter turnout | Voter turnout % | Spoilt votes | Spoilt votes % |
|---|---|---|---|---|---|---|---|---|---|---|---|---|---|---|---|---|---|---|
| N01 | Kuala Besut | Abdul Rahman Mokhtar (BN–UMNO) | 8,809 | 57.5% | Napisah Ismail (PR–PAS) | 6,375 | 41.6% | 2,434 | Abdul Rahman Mokhtar (BN–UMNO) | 17,679 | 99% | 1% | | | 15,328 | 86.7% | 144 | 0.8% |
| N02 | Kota Putera | Mohd Mahdi Musa (BN–UMNO) | 9,084 | 53.4% | Adam Mat Said (PR–PAS) | 7,672 | 45.1% | 1,412 | Muhammad Pehimi Yusof (BN–UMNO) | 19,727 | 99% | 1% | | 1% | 17,022 | 86.3% | 206 | 1.0% |
| N02 | Kota Putera | Mohd Mahdi Musa (BN–UMNO) | 9,084 | 53.4% | Mohamed Abdul Ghani Ibrahim (PR–PKR) | 60 | 0.4% | 1,412 | Muhammad Pehimi Yusof (BN–UMNO) | 19,727 | 99% | 1% | | 1% | 17,022 | 86.3% | 206 | 1.0% |
| N03 | Jertih | Muhammad Pehimi Yusof (BN–UMNO) | 8,396 | 52.4% | Wan Azhar Wan Ahmad (PR–PAS) | 7,466 | 46.6% | 930 | Idris Jusoh (BN–UMNO) | 18,770 | 96% | 4% | | | 16,034 | 85.4% | 172 | 0.9% |
| N04 | Hulu Besut | Nawi Mohamad (BN–UMNO) | 7,884 | 54.9% | Shalahhudin Jaafar (PR–PAS) | 6,314 | 43.9% | 1,570 | Nawi Mohamad (BN–UMNO) | 16,390 | 99% | 1% | | | 14,368 | 87.7% | 170 | 1.0% |
| N05 | Jabi | Mohd Iskandar Jaafar (BN–UMNO) | 7,735 | 52.2% | Azman Ibrahim (PR–PAS) | 6,953 | 46.9% | 782 | Ramlan Ali (BN–UMNO) | 16,787 | 99% | | | | 14,830 | 88.3% | 142 | 0.8% |
| N06 | Permaisuri | Mohd Jidin Shafee (BN–UMNO) | 9,188 | 51.7% | Wan Mokhtar Wan Ibrahim (PR–PKR) | 6,260 | 35.2% | 2,928 | Abdul Halim Jusoh (BN–UMNO) | 20,322 | 99% | 1% | | | 17,766 | 87.4% | 398 | 2.0% |
| N06 | Permaisuri | Mohd Jidin Shafee (BN–UMNO) | 9,188 | 51.7% | Mohd Yusop Majid (IND) | 1,920 | 10.8% | 2,928 | Abdul Halim Jusoh (BN–UMNO) | 20,322 | 99% | 1% | | | 17,766 | 87.4% | 398 | 2.0% |
| N07 | Langkap | Sabri Mohd Noor (BN–UMNO) | 8,425 | 60.1% | Hassan Karim (PR–PAS) | 5,403 | 38.5% | 3,022 | Asha'ari Idris (BN–UMNO) | 16,124 | 100% | | | | 14,018 | 86.9% | 190 | 1.2% |
| N08 | Batu Rakit | Bazlan Abd Rahman (BN–UMNO) | 7,008 | 56.0% | Che Ghani Che Ambak (PR–PAS) | 5,373 | 42.9% | 1,635 | Khazan Che Mat (BN–UMNO) | 14,047 | 100% | | | | 12,515 | 89.1% | 134 | 1.0% |
| N09 | Tepuh | Hishamuddin Abdul Karim (PR–PAS) | 11,128 | 50.0% | Muhammad Ramli Nuh (BN–UMNO) | 10,899 | 49.0% | 229 | Muhammad Ramli Nuh (BN–UMNO) | 25,162 | 99% | 1% | | | 22,247 | 88.4% | 220 | 0.9% |
| N10 | Teluk Pasu | Ridzuan Hashim (PR–PAS) | 9,098 | 49.8% | Abdul Rahin Mohd Said (BN–UMNO) | 8,989 | 49.2% | 109 | Abdul Rahin Mohd Said (BN–UMNO) | 20,121 | 98% | 2% | | | 18,283 | 90.9% | 196 | 1.0% |
| N11 | Seberang Takir | Ahmad Razif Abdul Rahman (BN–UMNO) | 7,731 | 54.3% | Zakaria Dagang (PR–PAS) | 6,221 | 43.7% | 1,510 | Ahmad Razif Abdul Rahman (BN–UMNO) | 16,212 | 99% | | | 1% | 14,229 | 87.8% | 204 | 1.3% |
| N11 | Seberang Takir | Ahmad Razif Abdul Rahman (BN–UMNO) | 7,731 | 54.3% | Ahmad Nazri Mohd Yusof (PR–PKR) | 73 | 0.5% | 1,510 | Ahmad Razif Abdul Rahman (BN–UMNO) | 16,212 | 99% | | | 1% | 14,229 | 87.8% | 204 | 1.3% |
| N12 | Bukit Tunggal | Alias Razak (PR–PAS) | 6,801 | 51.9% | Ismail Nik (BN–UMNO) | 6,149 | 46.9% | 652 | Alias Razak (PR–PAS) | 14,743 | 99% | 1% | | | 13,105 | 88.9% | 155 | 1.1% |
| N13 | Wakaf Mempelam | Mohd Abdul Wahid Endut (PR–PAS) | 12,515 | 56.2% | Wan Mahyuddin W Ngah (BN–UMNO) | 9,529 | 42.8% | 2,986 | Mohd Abdul Wahid Endut (PR–PAS) | 25,240 | 100% | | | | 22,264 | 88.2% | 220 | 0.9% |
| N14 | Bandar | Azan Ismail (PR–PKR) | 9,413 | 55.6% | Toh Chin Yaw (BN–MCA) | 7,254 | 42.8% | 2,159 | Toh Chin Yaw (BN–MCA) | 20,390 | 63% | 36% | 1% | | 16,943 | 83.1% | 276 | 1.4% |
| N15 | Ladang | Tengku Hassan Tengku Omar (PR–PAS) | 9,066 | 52.2% | Wan Ahmad Farid Wan Salleh (BN–UMNO) | 8,142 | 46.9% | 924 | Tengku Hassan Tengku Omar (PR–PAS) | 20,089 | 91% | 8% | 1% | | 17,373 | 86.5% | 165 | 0.8% |
| N16 | Batu Buruk | Syed Azman Syed Ahmad Nawawi (PR–PAS) | 13,679 | 54.0% | Che Mat Jusoh (BN–UMNO) | 11,406 | 45.1% | 2,273 | Syed Azman Syed Ahmad Nawawi (PR–PAS) | 28,687 | 98% | 2% | | | 25,316 | 88.2% | 231 | 0.8% |
| N17 | Alur Limbat | Ariffin Deraman (PR–PAS) | 10,844 | 50.8% | Alias Abdullah (BN–UMNO) | 10,199 | 47.7% | 645 | Alias Abdullah (BN–UMNO) | 23,983 | 96% | 3% | | | 21,361 | 89.1% | 244 | 1.0% |
| N17 | Alur Limbat | Ariffin Deraman (PR–PAS) | 10,844 | 50.8% | Ja'afar Jambol (IND) | 74 | 0.3% | 645 | Alias Abdullah (BN–UMNO) | 23,983 | 96% | 3% | | | 21,361 | 89.1% | 244 | 1.0% |
| N18 | Bukit Payung | Mohd. Nor Hamzah (PR–PAS) | 9,342 | 51.3% | Zaidi Muda (BN–UMNO) | 8,729 | 47.9% | 613 | Mohd Nor Hamzah (PR–PAS) | 20,063 | 100% | | | | 18,216 | 90.8% | 145 | 0.7% |
| N19 | Ru Rendang | Abdul Hadi Awang (PR–PAS) | 11,468 | 56.5% | Nik Dir Nik Wan Ku (BN–UMNO) | 8,649 | 42.6% | 2,819 | Abdul Hadi Awang (PR–PAS) | 22,662 | 100% | | | | 20,298 | 89.5% | 181 | 0.7% |
| N20 | Pengkalan Berangan | A Latiff Awang (BN–UMNO) | 11,677 | 53.6% | Sulaiman Sulong (PR–PAS) | 9,829 | 45.1% | 1,848 | Yahya Khatib Mohamad (BN–UMNO) | 24,087 | 96% | 4% | | | 21,776 | 90.4% | 270 | 1.1% |
| N21 | Telemung | Rozi Mamat (BN–UMNO) | 10,262 | 73.5% | Narawi Embong (PR–PKR) | 3,398 | 24.3% | 6,864 | Rozi Mamat (BN–UMNO) | 15,742 | 99% | | | 1% | 13,964 | 88.6% | 304 | 1.8% |
| N22 | Manir | Hilmi Harun (PR–PAS) | 6,873 | 51.6% | Yusof Awang Hitam (BN–UMNO) | 6,285 | 47.2% | 588 | Harun Taib (PR–PAS) | 14,637 | 100% | | | | 13,317 | 91.0% | 159 | 1.1% |
| N23 | Kuala Berang | T Putera T Awang (BN–UMNO) | 6,917 | 50.6% | Muhyiddin Abdul Rashid (PR–PAS) | 6,468 | 47.3% | 449 | Mohd Zawawi Ismail (BN–UMNO) | 15,330 | 99% | 1% | | | 13,665 | 89.1% | 280 | 1.8% |
| N24 | Ajil | Ghazali Taib (BN–UMNO) | 8,680 | 55.8% | Mohd Razki Yah (PR–PAS) | 5,898 | 37.9% | 2,782 | Rosol Wahid (BN–UMNO) | 17,834 | 99% | 1% | | | 15,553 | 87.2% | 305 | 1.7% |
| N24 | Ajil | Ghazali Taib (BN–UMNO) | 8,680 | 55.8% | Mohd Nuhairi Muhammad (IND) | 670 | 4.3% | 2,782 | Rosol Wahid (BN–UMNO) | 17,834 | 99% | 1% | | | 15,553 | 87.2% | 305 | 1.7% |
| N25 | Bukit Besi | Roslee Daud (BN–UMNO) | 6,966 | 59.8% | Roslan Ismail (PR–PAS) | 4,408 | 37.8% | 2,558 | Din Adam (BN–UMNO) | 13,387 | 99% | | | | 11,648 | 87.0% | 222 | 1.7% |
| N25 | Bukit Besi | Roslee Daud (BN–UMNO) | 6,966 | 59.8% | Mohd Shamsul Mat Amin (PR–PKR) | 52 | 0.4% | 2,558 | Din Adam (BN–UMNO) | 13,387 | 99% | | | | 11,648 | 87.0% | 222 | 1.7% |
| N26 | Rantau Abang | Alias Harun (PR–PAS) | 8,964 | 49.5% | Za'abar Mohd Adib (BN–UMNO) | 8,823 | 48.7% | 141 | Za'abar Mohd Adib (BN–UMNO) | 20,618 | 99% | 1% | | | 18,125 | 87.9% | 248 | 1.2% |
| N26 | Rantau Abang | Alias Harun (PR–PAS) | 8,964 | 49.5% | Mazlan Harun (IND) | 90 | 0.5% | 141 | Za'abar Mohd Adib (BN–UMNO) | 20,618 | 99% | 1% | | | 18,125 | 87.9% | 248 | 1.2% |
| N27 | Sura | Wan Hapandi Wan Nik (PR–PAS) | 8,952 | 59.3% | Zakariah Ali (BN–UMNO) | 5,995 | 39.7% | 2,957 | Wan Hassan Mohd Ramli (PR–PAS) | 17,705 | 91% | 9% | | | 15,088 | 85.2% | 141 | 0.8% |
| N28 | Paka | Satiful Bahri Mamat (PR–PAS) | 12,138 | 52.3% | Matulidi Jusoh (BN–UMNO) | 10,851 | 46.8% | 1,287 | Mohd Ariffin Abdullah (BN–UMNO) | 26,464 | 95% | 5% | | | 23,191 | 87.6% | 202 | 0.8% |
| N29 | Kemasik | Rosli Othman (BN–UMNO) | 8,230 | 50.2% | Che Alias Hamid (PR–PAS) | 7,332 | 44.7% | 898 | Rosli Othman (BN–UMNO) | 18,847 | 95% | 4% | | | 16,398 | 87.0% | 198 | 1.1% |
| N29 | Kemasik | Rosli Othman (BN–UMNO) | 8,230 | 50.2% | Zulkiflee Salleh (IND) | 638 | 3.9% | 898 | Rosli Othman (BN–UMNO) | 18,847 | 95% | 4% | | | 16,398 | 87.0% | 198 | 1.1% |
| N30 | Kijal | Ahmad Said (BN–UMNO) | 10,574 | 61.7% | Hazri Jusoh (PR–PAS) | 6,370 | 37.2% | 4,204 | Ahmad Said (BN–UMNO) | 19,269 | 97% | 2% | | | 17,137 | 88.9% | 193 | 1.0% |
| N31 | Chukai | Hanafiah Mat (PR–PAS) | 12,457 | 54.9% | Wan Ahmad Nizam Wan Abdul Hamid (BN–UMNO) | 10,011 | 44.1% | 2,446 | Mohamad Awang Tera (BN–UMNO) | 26,715 | 85% | 14% | 1% | | 22,707 | 85.0% | 239 | 0.9% |
| N32 | Air Putih | Wan Abdul Hakim Wan Mokhtar (BN–UMNO) | 13,523 | 57.0% | Abdul Razak Ibrahim (PR–PAS) | 9,890 | 41.7% | 3,633 | Wan Abdul Hakim Wan Mokhtar (BN–UMNO) | 27,111 | 95% | 3% | | | 23,730 | 87.5% | 317 | 1.2% |

== Penang ==
For more details on Pelan dan Helaian Mata (Scoresheet) Bahagian Pilihan Raya Negeri Pulau Pinang, see footnote

| # | Constituency | Winner | Votes | Votes % | Opponent(s) | Votes | Votes % | Majority | Incumbent | Eligible voters | Malay voters | Chinese voters | Indian voters | Others voters | Voter turnout | Voter turnout % | Spoilt votes | Spoilt votes % |
|---|---|---|---|---|---|---|---|---|---|---|---|---|---|---|---|---|---|---|
| N01 | Penaga | Mohd Zain Ahmad (BN–UMNO) | 8,350 | 54.9% | Rosidi Hussain (PR–PAS) | 6,688 | 44.0% | 1,662 | Azhar Ibrahim (BN–UMNO) | 16,681 | 91% | 9% | | | 15,206 | 91.2% | 168 | 1.0% |
| N02 | Bertam | Shariful Azhar Othman (BN–UMNO) | 7,939 | 54.9% | Syed Mikael Rizal Aidid (PR–PKR) | 6,297 | 43.5% | 1,642 | Zabariah Abdul Wahab (BN–UMNO) | 16,221 | 66% | 25% | 9% | | 14,471 | 89.2% | 235 | 1.4% |
| N03 | Pinang Tunggal | Roslan Saidin (BN–UMNO) | 9,155 | 53.9% | Ahmad Zakiyuddin Abdul Rahman (PR–PKR) | 7,568 | 44.6% | 1,587 | Roslan Saidin (BN–UMNO) | 18,733 | 73% | 23% | 4% | | 16,984 | 90.7% | 261 | 1.4% |
| N04 | Permatang Berangan | Omar Abd Hamid (BN–UMNO) | 8,913 | 54.2% | Arshad Md. Salleh (PR–PAS) | 7,292 | 44.3% | 1,621 | Shabudin Yahaya (BN–UMNO) | 18,336 | 83% | 8% | 9% | | 16,452 | 89.7% | 247 | 1.3% |
| N05 | Sungai Dua | Muhamad Yusoff Mohd Noor (BN–UMNO) | 7,951 | 49.4% | Zahadi Mohd. (PR–PAS) | 7,594 | 47.2% | 357 | Jasmin Mohamed (BN–UMNO) | 17,871 | 84% | 14% | 2% | | 16,089 | 90.0% | 200 | 1.1% |
| N05 | Sungai Dua | Muhamad Yusoff Mohd Noor (BN–UMNO) | 7,951 | 49.4% | Mohd Shariff Omar (IND) | 344 | 2.1% | 357 | Jasmin Mohamed (BN–UMNO) | 17,871 | 84% | 14% | 2% | | 16,089 | 90.0% | 200 | 1.1% |
| N06 | Telok Ayer Tawar | Jahara Hamid (BN–UMNO) | 8,040 | 52.0% | Norhayati Jaafar (PR–PKR) | 7,200 | 46.5% | 840 | Jahara Hamid (BN–UMNO) | 17,835 | 67% | 22% | 10% | | 15,471 | 86.7% | 231 | 1.3% |
| N07 | Sungai Puyu | Phee Boon Poh (PR–DAP) | 19,381 | 85.3% | Sum Yoo Keong (BN–MCA) | 3,174 | 14.0% | 16,207 | Phee Boon Poh (PR–DAP) | 25,282 | 7% | 85% | 7% | | 22,729 | 89.9% | 174 | 0.7% |
| N08 | Bagan Jermal | Lim Hock Seng (PR–DAP) | 16,416 | 77.0% | Tan Chuan Hong (BN–MCA) | 4,561 | 21.4% | 11,855 | Lim Hock Seng (PR–DAP) | 24,608 | 17% | 68% | 15% | | 21,314 | 86.6% | 222 | 0.9% |
| N08 | Bagan Jermal | Lim Hock Seng (PR–DAP) | 16,416 | 77.0% | Lim Kim Chu (PCM) | 115 | 0.5% | 11,855 | Lim Hock Seng (PR–DAP) | 24,608 | 17% | 68% | 15% | | 21,314 | 86.6% | 222 | 0.9% |
| N09 | Bagan Dalam | Tanasekharan Autherapady (PR–DAP) | 10,253 | 65.4% | Karuppanan M. Malairaja (BN–MIC) | 5,092 | 32.5% | 5,161 | Tanasekharan Autherapady (PR–DAP) | 18,613 | 25% | 51% | 24% | | 15,687 | 84.3% | 241 | 1.3% |
| N09 | Bagan Dalam | Tanasekharan Autherapady (PR–DAP) | 10,253 | 65.4% | Lim Seang Teik (PCM) | 76 | 0.5% | 5,161 | Tanasekharan Autherapady (PR–DAP) | 18,613 | 25% | 51% | 24% | | 15,687 | 84.3% | 241 | 1.3% |
| N09 | Bagan Dalam | Tanasekharan Autherapady (PR–DAP) | 10,253 | 65.4% | Asoghan Govindaraju (IND) | 25 | 0.2% | 5,161 | Tanasekharan Autherapady (PR–DAP) | 18,613 | 25% | 51% | 24% | | 15,687 | 84.3% | 241 | 1.3% |
| N10 | Seberang Jaya | Afif Bahardin (PR–PKR) | 14,148 | 53.7% | Mohammad Nasir Abdullah (BN–UMNO) | 11,689 | 44.3% | 2,459 | Arif Shah Omar Shah (BN–UMNO) | 29,964 | 64% | 23% | 12% | | 26,362 | 88.0% | 274 | 0.9% |
| N10 | Seberang Jaya | Afif Bahardin (PR–PKR) | 14,148 | 53.7% | Shamsut Tabrej G.M Ismail Maricar (IND) | 251 | 1.0% | 2,459 | Arif Shah Omar Shah (BN–UMNO) | 29,964 | 64% | 23% | 12% | | 26,362 | 88.0% | 274 | 0.9% |
| N11 | Permatang Pasir | Mohd Salleh Man (PR–PAS) | 13,479 | 66.3% | Anuar Faisal Yahaya (BN–UMNO) | 6,653 | 32.7% | 6,826 | Mohd Salleh Man (PR–PAS) | 22,905 | 73% | 25% | 2% | | 20,339 | 88.8% | 207 | 0.9% |
| N12 | Penanti | Norlela Ariffin (PR–PKR) | 9,387 | 56.5% | Ibrahim Ahmad (BN–UMNO) | 7,048 | 42.4% | 2,339 | Mansor Othman (PR–PKR) | 18,830 | 76% | 22% | 2% | | 16,626 | 88.5% | 191 | 1.2% |
| N13 | Berapit | Ong Kok Fooi (PR–DAP) | 16,995 | 87.6% | Lau Chiek Tuan (BN–MCA) | 2,230 | 11.5% | 14,765 | Ong Kok Fooi (PR–DAP) | 22,394 | 4% | 86% | 10% | | 19,390 | 86.6% | 165 | 0.7% |
| N14 | Machang Bubok | Lee Khai Loon (PR–PKR) | 19,080 | 69.5% | Tan Lok Heah (BN–GERAKAN) | 7,180 | 26.1% | 11,900 | Tan Hock Leong (PR–PKR) | 30,771 | 37% | 52% | 11% | | 27,465 | 89.3% | 470 | 1.5% |
| N14 | Machang Bubok | Lee Khai Loon (PR–PKR) | 19,080 | 69.5% | Wan Balkis Wan Abdullah (IND) | 252 | 0.9% | 11,900 | Tan Hock Leong (PR–PKR) | 30,771 | 37% | 52% | 11% | | 27,465 | 89.3% | 470 | 1.5% |
| N14 | Machang Bubok | Lee Khai Loon (PR–PKR) | 19,080 | 69.5% | Tan Hock Leong (IND) | 172 | 0.6% | 11,900 | Tan Hock Leong (PR–PKR) | 30,771 | 37% | 52% | 11% | | 27,465 | 89.3% | 470 | 1.5% |
| N14 | Machang Bubok | Lee Khai Loon (PR–PKR) | 19,080 | 69.5% | Vikneswaran Muniandy (KITA) | 159 | 0.6% | 11,900 | Tan Hock Leong (PR–PKR) | 30,771 | 37% | 52% | 11% | | 27,465 | 89.3% | 470 | 1.5% |
| N14 | Machang Bubok | Lee Khai Loon (PR–PKR) | 19,080 | 69.5% | Ooi Suan Hoe (IND) | 152 | 0.6% | 11,900 | Tan Hock Leong (PR–PKR) | 30,771 | 37% | 52% | 11% | | 27,465 | 89.3% | 470 | 1.5% |
| N15 | Padang Lalang | Chong Eng (PR–DAP) | 18,657 | 82.7% | Tan Teik Cheng (BN–MCA) | 3,727 | 16.5% | 14,930 | Tan Cheong Heng (PR–DAP) | 25,831 | 11% | 82% | 7% | | 22,550 | 87.3% | 166 | 0.6% |
| N16 | Perai | Ramasamy Palanisamy (PR–DAP) | 10,549 | 78.3% | Krishnan Letchumanan (BN–MIC) | 2,590 | 19.2% | 7,959 | Ramasamy Palanisamy (PR–DAP) | 16,058 | 11% | 52% | 36% | | 13,465 | 83.9% | 142 | 0.9% |
| N16 | Perai | Ramasamy Palanisamy (PR–DAP) | 10,549 | 78.3% | Muhammad Ridhwan Sulaiman (IND) | 184 | 1.4% | 7,959 | Ramasamy Palanisamy (PR–DAP) | 16,058 | 11% | 52% | 36% | | 13,465 | 83.9% | 142 | 0.9% |
| N17 | Bukit Tengah | Ong Chin Wen (PR–PKR) | 10,730 | 64.2% | Teng Chang Yeow (BN–GERAKAN) | 5,540 | 33.1% | 5,190 | Ong Chin Wen (PR–PKR) | 18,928 | 36% | 46% | 18% | | 16,722 | 88.3% | 270 | 1.4% |
| N17 | Bukit Tengah | Ong Chin Wen (PR–PKR) | 10,730 | 64.2% | Mohan Apparoo (IND) | 182 | 1.1% | 5,190 | Ong Chin Wen (PR–PKR) | 18,928 | 36% | 46% | 18% | | 16,722 | 88.3% | 270 | 1.4% |
| N18 | Bukit Tambun | Law Choo Kiang (PR–PKR) | 15,217 | 76.3% | Lai Chew Hock (BN–GERAKAN) | 4,197 | 21.0% | 11,020 | Law Choo Kiang (PR–PKR) | 22,514 | 14% | 67% | 19% | | 19,950 | 88.6% | 303 | 1.3% |
| N18 | Bukit Tambun | Law Choo Kiang (PR–PKR) | 15,217 | 76.3% | A'Ziss Zainal Abiddin (IND) | 142 | 0.7% | 11,020 | Law Choo Kiang (PR–PKR) | 22,514 | 14% | 67% | 19% | | 19,950 | 88.6% | 303 | 1.3% |
| N18 | Bukit Tambun | Law Choo Kiang (PR–PKR) | 15,217 | 76.3% | Loganathan Ayyayu (IND) | 91 | 0.5% | 11,020 | Law Choo Kiang (PR–PKR) | 22,514 | 14% | 67% | 19% | | 19,950 | 88.6% | 303 | 1.3% |
| N19 | Jawi | Soon Lip Chee (PR–DAP) | 15,219 | 70.1% | Tan Cheng Liang (BN–MCA) | 6,143 | 28.3% | 9,076 | Tan Beng Huat (PR–DAP) | 24,735 | 23% | 54% | 24% | | 21,701 | 87.7% | 339 | 1.4% |
| N20 | Sungai Bakap | Maktar Shapee (PR–PKR) | 9,258 | 54.6% | Mohd Foad Mat Isa (BN–UMNO) | 7,453 | 43.9% | 1,805 | Maktar Shapee (PR–PKR) | 19,051 | 57% | 25% | 18% | | 16,967 | 89.1% | 256 | 1.3% |
| N21 | Sungai Acheh | Mahmud Zakaria (BN–UMNO) | 6,891 | 49.6% | Badrul Hisham Shaharin (PR–PKR) | 6,083 | 43.8% | 808 | Mahmud Zakaria (BN–UMNO) | 15,559 | 66% | 26% | 8% | | 13,881 | 89.2% | 217 | 1.4% |
| N21 | Sungai Acheh | Mahmud Zakaria (BN–UMNO) | 6,891 | 49.6% | Mohd Yusni Mat Piah (PR–PAS) | 690 | 5.0% | 808 | Mahmud Zakaria (BN–UMNO) | 15,559 | 66% | 26% | 8% | | 13,881 | 89.2% | 217 | 1.4% |
| N22 | Tanjong Bunga | Teh Yee Cheu (PR–DAP) | 11,033 | 65.8% | Chia Kwang Chye (BN–GERAKAN) | 5,518 | 32.9% | 5,515 | Teh Yee Cheu (PR–DAP) | 20,068 | 25% | 61% | 12% | | 16,777 | 83.6% | 193 | 1.0% |
| N22 | Tanjong Bunga | Teh Yee Cheu (PR–DAP) | 11,033 | 65.8% | Beh Seong Leng (IND) | 33 | 0.2% | 5,515 | Teh Yee Cheu (PR–DAP) | 20,068 | 25% | 61% | 12% | | 16,777 | 83.6% | 193 | 1.0% |
| N23 | Air Puteh | Lim Guan Eng (PR–DAP) | 9,626 | 82.5% | Tan Ken Keong (BN–MCA) | 1,882 | 16.1% | 7,744 | Lim Guan Eng (PR–DAP) | 13,803 | 9% | 83% | 8% | | 11,669 | 84.5% | 161 | 1.2% |
| N24 | Kebun Bunga | Cheah Kah Peng (PR–PKR) | 12,366 | 76.6% | Hng Chee Wey (BN–GERAKAN) | 3,336 | 20.7% | 9,030 | Jason Ong Khan Lee (PR–PKR) | 19,278 | 7% | 77% | 15% | | 16,135 | 83.7% | 274 | 1.4% |
| N24 | Kebun Bunga | Cheah Kah Peng (PR–PKR) | 12,366 | 76.6% | Jayaraman K. Kunchu Kannu (IND) | 159 | 1.0% | 9,030 | Jason Ong Khan Lee (PR–PKR) | 19,278 | 7% | 77% | 15% | | 16,135 | 83.7% | 274 | 1.4% |
| N25 | Pulau Tikus | Yap Soo Huey (PR–DAP) | 11,256 | 78.1% | Rowena Yam (BN–GERAKAN) | 3,036 | 21.1% | 8,220 | Koay Teng Hai (PR–DAP) | 17,936 | 12% | 78% | 8% | | 14,417 | 80.4% | 125 | 0.7% |
| N26 | Padang Kota | Chow Kon Yeow (PR–DAP) | 9,563 | 79.3% | Oh Tong Keong (BN–GERAKAN) | 2,367 | 19.6% | 7,196 | Chow Kon Yeow (PR–DAP) | 15,375 | 6% | 78% | 16% | | 12,058 | 78.4% | 128 | 0.8% |
| N27 | Pengkalan Kota | Lau Keng Ee (PR–DAP) | 15,403 | 88.3% | Loke Cheang Gin (BN–MCA) | 1,803 | 10.3% | 13,600 | Lau Keng Ee (PR–DAP) | 19,980 | 1% | 94% | 5% | | 17,449 | 87.3% | 243 | 1.2% |
| N28 | Komtar | Teh Lai Heng (PR–DAP) | 10,669 | 79.9% | Loh Chye Teik (BN–MCA) | 2,555 | 19.1% | 8,114 | Ng Wei Aik (PR–DAP) | 16,132 | 9% | 83% | 8% | | 13,356 | 82.8% | 107 | 0.7% |
| N28 | Komtar | Teh Lai Heng (PR–DAP) | 10,669 | 79.9% | Liew Yeow Hooi (PCM) | 25 | 0.2% | 8,114 | Ng Wei Aik (PR–DAP) | 16,132 | 9% | 83% | 8% | | 13,356 | 82.8% | 107 | 0.7% |
| N29 | Datok Keramat | Jagdeep Singh Deo (PR–DAP) | 11,720 | 62.7% | Ong Thean Lye (BN–GERAKAN) | 6,700 | 35.8% | 5,020 | Jagdeep Singh Deo (PR–DAP) | 21,900 | 29% | 57% | 14% | | 18,694 | 85.4% | 274 | 1.3% |
| N30 | Sungai Pinang | Lim Siew Khim (PR–DAP) | 12,354 | 60.5% | Thor Teong Gee (BN–GERAKAN) | 7,647 | 37.4% | 4,707 | Koid Teng Guan (PR–DAP) | 23,501 | 31% | 54% | 14% | | 20,429 | 86.9% | 287 | 1.2% |
| N30 | Sungai Pinang | Lim Siew Khim (PR–DAP) | 12,354 | 60.5% | Mohamed Yacoob Mohamed Noor (IND) | 141 | 0.7% | 4,707 | Koid Teng Guan (PR–DAP) | 23,501 | 31% | 54% | 14% | | 20,429 | 86.9% | 287 | 1.2% |
| N31 | Batu Lancang | Danny Law Heng Kiang (PR–DAP) | 18,760 | 84.1% | Lee Boon Ten (BN–GERAKAN) | 3,396 | 15.2% | 15,364 | Law Heng Kiang (PR–DAP) | 25,846 | 7% | 86% | 6% | | 22,313 | 86.3% | 157 | 0.6% |
| N32 | Seri Delima | RSN Rayer (PR–DAP) | 14,478 | 72.8% | Low Joo Hiap (BN–MCA) | 5,201 | 26.2% | 9,277 | RSN Rayer (PR–DAP) | 23,841 | 23% | 66% | 11% | | 19,888 | 83.4% | 209 | 0.9% |
| N33 | Air Itam | Wong Hon Wai (PR–DAP) | 11,308 | 73.0% | Loo Jieh Sheng (BN–GERAKAN) | 3,992 | 25.8% | 7,316 | Wong Hon Wai (PR–DAP) | 18,407 | 21% | 69% | 9% | | 15,493 | 84.2% | 193 | 1.0% |
| N34 | Paya Terubong | Yeoh Soon Hin (PR–DAP) | 30,295 | 86.1% | Koh Wan Leong (BN–MCA) | 4,576 | 13.0% | 25,719 | Yeoh Soon Hin (PR–DAP) | 39,649 | 6% | 82% | 11% | | 35,176 | 88.7% | 305 | 0.8% |
| N35 | Batu Uban | Jayabalan A. Thambyappa (PR–PKR) | 17,017 | 69.0% | Goh Kheng Sneah (BN–GERAKAN) | 7,160 | 29.0% | 9,857 | S Raveenthran (PR–PKR) | 28,649 | 27% | 60% | 13% | | 24,675 | 86.1% | 246 | 0.9% |
| N35 | Batu Uban | Jayabalan A. Thambyappa (PR–PKR) | 17,017 | 69.0% | Mohd Noor Sirajajudeen Mohd Abdul Kader (IND) | 186 | 0.8% | 9,857 | S Raveenthran (PR–PKR) | 28,649 | 27% | 60% | 13% | | 24,675 | 86.1% | 246 | 0.9% |
| N35 | Batu Uban | Jayabalan A. Thambyappa (PR–PKR) | 17,017 | 69.0% | Baratharajan Narayanasamy Pillai (IND) | 40 | 0.2% | 9,857 | S Raveenthran (PR–PKR) | 28,649 | 27% | 60% | 13% | | 24,675 | 86.1% | 246 | 0.9% |
| N35 | Batu Uban | Jayabalan A. Thambyappa (PR–PKR) | 17,017 | 69.0% | Rajendra Ammasi (IND) | 26 | 0.1% | 9,857 | S Raveenthran (PR–PKR) | 28,649 | 27% | 60% | 13% | | 24,675 | 86.1% | 246 | 0.9% |
| N36 | Pantai Jerejak | Mohd Rashid Hasnon (PR–PKR) | 11,805 | 64.1% | Wong Mun Hoe (BN-GERAKAN) | 6,451 | 35.0% | 5,354 | Sim Tze Tzin (PR–PKR) | 21,560 | 39% | 49% | 11% | | 18,417 | 85.4% | 161 | 0.7% |
| N37 | Batu Maung | Abdul Malik Abdul Kassim (PR–PKR) | 14,265 | 55.8% | Mansor Musa (BN–UMNO) | 10,875 | 42.5% | 3,390 | Abdul Malik Abdul Kassim (PR–PKR) | 28,946 | 51% | 39% | 9% | | 25,576 | 88.4% | 358 | 1.2% |
| N37 | Batu Maung | Abdul Malik Abdul Kassim (PR–PKR) | 14,265 | 55.8% | Rahmad Isahak (IND) | 78 | 0.3% | 3,390 | Abdul Malik Abdul Kassim (PR–PKR) | 28,946 | 51% | 39% | 9% | | 25,576 | 88.4% | 358 | 1.2% |
| N38 | Bayan Lepas | Nordin Ahmad (BN–UMNO) | 9,408 | 50.1% | Asnah Hashim (PR–PAS) | 8,950 | 47.7% | 458 | Syed Amerruddin Syed Ahmad (BN–UMNO) | 21,277 | 64% | 31% | 5% | | 18,765 | 88.2% | 281 | 1.3% |
| N38 | Bayan Lepas | Nordin Ahmad (BN–UMNO) | 9,408 | 50.1% | Vellautham Arumugam (IND) | 126 | 0.7% | 458 | Syed Amerruddin Syed Ahmad (BN–UMNO) | 21,277 | 64% | 31% | 5% | | 18,765 | 88.2% | 281 | 1.3% |
| N39 | Pulau Betong | Muhammad Farid Saad (BN–UMNO) | 6,852 | 50.7% | Mohd Tuah Ismail (PR–PKR) | 6,457 | 47.8% | 395 | Muhammad Farid Saad (BN–UMNO) | 15,316 | 63% | 34% | 3% | | 13,509 | 86.9% | 200 | 1.3% |
| N40 | Telok Bahang | Shah Haedan Ayoob Hussain Shah (BN–UMNO) | 6,034 | 52.8% | Abdul Halim Hussain (PR–PKR) | 5,233 | 45.8% | 801 | Hilmi Yahaya (BN–UMNO) | 13,048 | 64% | 33% | 3% | | 11,434 | 87.6% | 167 | 1.3% |

== Perak ==
For more details on Pelan dan Helaian Mata (Scoresheet) Bahagian Pilihan Raya Negeri Perak, see footnote

| # | Constituency | Winner | Votes | Votes % | Opponent(s) | Votes | Votes % | Majority | Incumbent | Eligible voters | Malay voters | Chinese voters | Indian voters | Others voters | Voter turnout | Voter turnout % | Spoilt votes | Spoilt votes % |
|---|---|---|---|---|---|---|---|---|---|---|---|---|---|---|---|---|---|---|
| N01 | Pengkalan Hulu | Aznel Ibrahim (BN–UMNO) | 7,206 | 63.6% | Abdullah Masnan (PR–PKR) | 3,845 | 33.9% | 3,361 | Tajol Rosli Mohd Ghazali (BN–UMNO) | 13,924 | 73% | 10% | | 11% | 11,330 | 81.4% | 279 | 2.0% |
| N02 | Temenggor | Salbiah Mohamed (BN–UMNO) | 9,331 | 59.2% | Mohd Supian Nordin (PR–PKR) | 6,116 | 38.8% | 3,215 | Hasbullah Osman (BN–UMNO) | 18,801 | 65% | 20% | | 13% | 15,771 | 83.9% | 324 | 1.7% |
| N03 | Kenering | Mohd Tarmizi Idris (BN–UMNO) | 8,216 | 61.4% | Mohamd Tarmizi Abdul Hamid (PR–PKR) | 4,881 | 36.5% | 3,335 | Mohd Tarmizi Idris (BN–UMNO) | 15,830 | 83% | 12% | | 4% | 13,381 | 84.5% | 284 | 1.8% |
| N04 | Kota Tampan | Saarani Mohamad (BN–UMNO) | 5,893 | 58.3% | Zahrul Nizam Abdul Majid (PR–PKR) | 4,049 | 40.1% | 1,844 | Saarani Mohamad (BN–UMNO) | 12,120 | 81% | 17% | 2% | | 10,101 | 83.3% | 159 | 1.3% |
| N05 | Selama | Mohamad Daud Mohd Yusoff (BN–UMNO) | 6,854 | 51.6% | Mohd Akmal Kamaruddin (PR–PAS) | 6,235 | 47.0% | 619 | Mohamad Daud Mohd Yusoff (BN–UMNO) | 15,403 | 85% | 9% | 6% | | 13,272 | 86.2% | 183 | 1.2% |
| N06 | Kubu Gajah | Ahmad Hasbullah Alias (BN–UMNO) | 5,807 | 54.3% | Mohd Nazri Din (PR–PAS) | 4,722 | 44.1% | 1,085 | Raja Ahmad Zainuddin Raja Omar (BN–UMNO) | 12,611 | 93% | 2% | 5% | | 10,699 | 84.8% | 170 | 1.3% |
| N07 | Batu Kurau | Muhammad Amin Zakaria (BN–UMNO) | 9,789 | 61.3% | Mohammad Fadzil Alias (PR–PKR) | 5,955 | 37.3% | 3,834 | Mohd Najmuddin Elias (BN–UMNO) | 18,563 | 90% | 3% | 7% | | 15,966 | 86.0% | 222 | 1.2% |
| N08 | Titi Serong | Abu Bakar Hussian (PR–PAS) | 12,839 | 53.0% | Abu Bakar Mat Ali (BN–UMNO) | 11,045 | 45.6% | 1,794 | Khalil Idham Lim Abdullah (PR–PAS) | 28,107 | 75% | 17% | 8% | | 24,225 | 86.2% | 341 | 1.2% |
| N09 | Kuala Kurau | Abdul Yunus Jamhari (PR–PKR) | 12,336 | 61.9% | Mohd Salleh Mat Disa (BN–UMNO) | 7,322 | 36.7% | 5,014 | Abdul Yunus Jamhari (PR–PKR) | 23,315 | 60% | 39% | 2% | | 19,940 | 85.5% | 282 | 1.2% |
| N10 | Alor Pongsu | Sham Mat Sahat (BN–UMNO) | 8,286 | 55.9% | Rosli Ibrahim (PR–PKR) | 6,090 | 41.1% | 2,196 | Sham Mat Sahat (BN–UMNO) | 17,666 | 72% | 11% | 16% | | 14,820 | 83.9% | 339 | 1.9% |
| N10 | Alor Pongsu | Sham Mat Sahat (BN–UMNO) | 8,286 | 55.9% | Shamsul Amir Ramly (IND) | 105 | 0.7% | 2,196 | Sham Mat Sahat (BN–UMNO) | 17,666 | 72% | 11% | 16% | | 14,820 | 83.9% | 339 | 1.9% |
| N11 | Gunong Semanggol | Mohd Zawawi Abu Hassan (PR–PAS) | 8,354 | 53.6% | Zulkarnain Ismail (BN–UMNO) | 6,949 | 44.6% | 1,405 | Ramli Tusin (PR–PAS) | 18,287 | 82% | 13% | 5% | | 15,598 | 85.3% | 224 | 1.2% |
| N11 | Gunong Semanggol | Mohd Zawawi Abu Hassan (PR–PAS) | 8,354 | 53.6% | Halidi Wahab (IND) | 71 | 0.5% | 1,405 | Ramli Tusin (PR–PAS) | 18,287 | 82% | 13% | 5% | | 15,598 | 85.3% | 224 | 1.2% |
| N12 | Selinsing | Husin Din (PR–PAS) | 8,215 | 51.7% | Sharudin Ahmad (BN–UMNO) | 7,406 | 46.6% | 809 | Husin Din (PR–PAS) | 18,839 | 73% | 18% | 9% | | 15,901 | 84.4% | 280 | 1.5% |
| N13 | Kuala Sapetang | Chua Yee Ling (PR–PKR) | 10,775 | 49.8% | Loh Swee Eng (BN–GERAKAN) | 10,017 | 46.3% | 758 | Tai Sing Ng (PR–PKR) | 25,119 | 63% | 29% | 8% | | 21,642 | 86.2% | 420 | 1.7% |
| N13 | Kuala Sapetang | Chua Yee Ling (PR–PKR) | 10,775 | 49.8% | Zainal Abidin Abd Rahman (BERJASA) | 430 | 2.0% | 758 | Tai Sing Ng (PR–PKR) | 25,119 | 63% | 29% | 8% | | 21,642 | 86.2% | 420 | 1.7% |
| N14 | Changkat Jering | Mohammad Nizar Jamaluddin (PR–PAS) | 14,495 | 51.4% | Rosli Husin (BN–UMNO) | 13,325 | 47.3% | 1,170 | Mohd Osman Mohd Jailu (IND) | 33,095 | 63% | 26% | 11% | | 28,185 | 85.2% | 281 | 0.8% |
| N14 | Changkat Jering | Mohammad Nizar Jamaluddin (PR–PAS) | 14,495 | 51.4% | Zulkefli Ibrahim (IND) | 84 | 0.3% | 1,170 | Mohd Osman Mohd Jailu (IND) | 33,095 | 63% | 26% | 11% | | 28,185 | 85.2% | 281 | 0.8% |
| N15 | Trong | Zabri Abd Wahid (BN–UMNO) | 6,353 | 57.4% | Norazli Musa (PR–PAS) | 4,549 | 41.1% | 1,804 | Rosli Husin (BN–UMNO) | 13,043 | 74% | 17% | 9% | | 11,065 | 84.8% | 163 | 1.2% |
| N16 | Kamunting | Mohamad Zahir Abdul Khalid (BN–UMNO) | 11,784 | 51.5% | Mohamad Fakhrudin Abdul Aziz (PR–PAS) | 10,897 | 47.6% | 887 | Mohamad Zahir Abd Khalid (BN–UMNO) | 27,348 | 66% | 19% | 13% | | 22,893 | 83.7% | 212 | 0.8% |
| N17 | Pokok Assam | Teh Kok Lim (PR–DAP) | 12,780 | 71.1% | Ho Cheng Wang (BN–MCA) | 4,855 | 27.0% | 7,925 | Yee Seu Kai (PR–DAP) | 22,360 | 16% | 73% | 11% | | 17,986 | 80.4% | 159 | 0.7% |
| N17 | Pokok Assam | Teh Kok Lim (PR–DAP) | 12,780 | 71.1% | Mohd Yusoff Abdull Hamid (IND) | 192 | 1.1% | 7,925 | Yee Seu Kai (PR–DAP) | 22,360 | 16% | 73% | 11% | | 17,986 | 80.4% | 159 | 0.7% |
| N18 | Aulong | Leow Thye Yih (PR–DAP) | 14,843 | 65.0% | Soo Kay Ping (BN–GERAKAN) | 7,513 | 32.9% | 7,330 | Yew Tian Hoe (PR–DAP) | 28,440 | 26% | 57% | 15% | | 22,835 | 80.3% | 254 | 0.9% |
| N18 | Aulong | Leow Thye Yih (PR–DAP) | 14,843 | 65.0% | Yew Tian Hoe (IND) | 225 | 1.0% | 7,330 | Yew Tian Hoe (PR–DAP) | 28,440 | 26% | 57% | 15% | | 22,835 | 80.3% | 254 | 0.9% |
| N19 | Chenderoh | Zainun Mat Noor (BN–UMNO) | 6,457 | 55.9% | Mohamad Azalan Mohamad Radzi (PR–PAS) | 4,890 | 42.4% | 1,567 | Siti Salmah Mat Jusak (BN–UMNO) | 13,617 | 80% | 15% | 6% | | 11,543 | 84.8% | 196 | 1.4% |
| N20 | Lubok Merbau | Siti Salmah Mat Jusak (BN–UMNO) | 6,261 | 49.5% | Mohd Zainudin Mohd Yusof (PR–PAS) | 6,208 | 49.1% | 53 | Mohd Zainuddin Mohd Yusof (PR–PAS) | 14,901 | 73% | 18% | 8% | | 12,647 | 84.9% | 178 | 1.2% |
| N21 | Lintang | Mohd Zolkafly Harun (BN–UMNO) | 11,444 | 59.3% | Ahmad Mazlan Othman (PR–PAS) | 7,467 | 38.7% | 3,977 | Ahamad Pakeh Adam (BN–UMNO) | 23,433 | 56% | 19% | 15% | | 19,285 | 82.3% | 374 | 1.6% |
| N22 | Jalong | Loh Sze Yee (PR–DAP) | 13,664 | 61.3% | Liew Yew Aw (BN–GERAKAN) | 6,895 | 30.9% | 6,769 | Leong Mee Meng (PR–DAP) | 28,163 | 14% | 56% | 27% | | 22,289 | 74.5% | 427 | 1.5% |
| N22 | Jalong | Loh Sze Yee (PR–DAP) | 13,664 | 61.3% | Kalimuthu Sinnu (IND) | 1,303 | 5.8% | 6,769 | Leong Mee Meng (PR–DAP) | 28,163 | 14% | 56% | 27% | | 22,289 | 74.5% | 427 | 1.5% |
| N23 | Manjoi | Mohamad Ziad Mohamed Zainal Abidin (BN–UMNO) | 21,511 | 49.4% | Asmuni Awi (PR–PAS) | 21,379 | 49.0% | 132 | Nadzri Ismail (BN–UMNO) | 51,036 | 67% | 22% | 10% | | 43,588 | 85.4% | 698 | 1.4% |
| N24 | Hulu Kinta | Aminuddin Md Hanafiah (BN–UMNO) | 18,893 | 58.1% | M A Tinagaran Arumugam (PR–PKR) | 12,775 | 39.3% | 6,118 | Rusnah Kassim (BN–UMNO) | 38,399 | 60% | 22% | 15% | | 32,534 | 84.7% | 616 | 1.6% |
| N24 | Hulu Kinta | Aminuddin Md Hanafiah (BN–UMNO) | 18,893 | 58.1% | Sulaiman Zakariya (IND) | 250 | 0.8% | 6,118 | Rusnah Kassim (BN–UMNO) | 38,399 | 60% | 22% | 15% | | 32,534 | 84.7% | 616 | 1.6% |
| N25 | Canning | Wong Kah Woh (PR–DAP) | 21,068 | 75.3% | Ceylyn Tay Wei Lung (BN–GERAKAN) | 6,624 | 23.7% | 14,444 | Wong Kah Woh (PR–DAP) | 35,181 | 14% | 76% | 8% | | 27,994 | 79.6% | 302 | 0.9% |
| N26 | Tebing Tinggi | Ong Boon Piow (PR–DAP) | 10,131 | 69.3% | Khoo Boon Chuan (BN–MCA) | 4,244 | 29.0% | 5,887 | Ong Boon Piow (PR–DAP) | 19,006 | 21% | 73% | 6% | | 14,618 | 76.9% | 243 | 1.3% |
| N27 | Pasir Pinji | Howard Lee Chuan How (PR–DAP) | 17,896 | 79.9% | Thong Fah Chong (BN–MCA) | 4,264 | 19.0% | 13,632 | Su Keong Siong (PR–DAP) | 27,631 | 10% | 88% | 2% | | 22,387 | 81.0% | 227 | 0.8% |
| N28 | Bercham | Cheong Chee Khing (PR–DAP) | 20,362 | 74.9% | Lim Huey Shan (BN–MCA) | 6,446 | 23.7% | 13,916 | Sum Cheok Leng (PR–DAP) | 32,816 | 12% | 76% | 11% | | 27,189 | 82.9% | 288 | 0.9% |
| N28 | Bercham | Cheong Chee Khing (PR–DAP) | 20,362 | 74.9% | Kalimuthu Ranggayah (IND) | 93 | 0.3% | 13,916 | Sum Cheok Leng (PR–DAP) | 32,816 | 12% | 76% | 11% | | 27,189 | 82.9% | 288 | 0.9% |
| N29 | Kepayang | Nga Kor Ming (PR–DAP) | 10,948 | 62.4% | Chang Kok Aun (BN–MCA) | 6,344 | 36.2% | 4,604 | Loke Chee Yan (PR–DAP) | 22,098 | 24% | 61% | 14% | | 17,532 | 79.3% | 240 | 1.1% |
| N30 | Buntong | Sivasubramaniam Athinarayanan (PR–DAP) | 13,062 | 71.8% | Sivarraajh Chandran (BN–MIC) | 4,433 | 24.4% | 8,629 | Sivasubramaniam Athinarayanan (PR–DAP) | 22,847 | 6% | 44% | 48% | | 18,195 | 79.6% | 312 | 1.4% |
| N30 | Buntong | Sivasubramaniam Athinarayanan (PR–DAP) | 13,062 | 71.8% | Iruthiyam Sebastiar Anthonisamy (IND) | 261 | 1.4% | 8,629 | Sivasubramaniam Athinarayanan (PR–DAP) | 22,847 | 6% | 44% | 48% | | 18,195 | 79.6% | 312 | 1.4% |
| N30 | Buntong | Sivasubramaniam Athinarayanan (PR–DAP) | 13,062 | 71.8% | Mohd Basri Shafie (IND) | 127 | 0.7% | 8,629 | Sivasubramaniam Athinarayanan (PR–DAP) | 22,847 | 6% | 44% | 48% | | 18,195 | 79.6% | 312 | 1.4% |
| N31 | Jelapang | Teh Hock Ke (PR–DAP) | 16,921 | 68.9% | Mokan Supramaniam (BN–MIC) | 4,655 | 18.9% | 12,266 | Hee Yit Foong (IND) | 30,032 | 7% | 68% | 25% | | 24,575 | 81.8% | 431 | 1.4% |
| N31 | Jelapang | Teh Hock Ke (PR–DAP) | 16,921 | 68.9% | Sarasvathy Muthu (PSM) | 2,568 | 10.4% | 12,266 | Hee Yit Foong (IND) | 30,032 | 7% | 68% | 25% | | 24,575 | 81.8% | 431 | 1.4% |
| N32 | Menglembu | Lim Pek Har (PR–DAP) | 20,694 | 83.3% | Loo Gar Yen (BN–MCA) | 3,895 | 15.7% | 16,799 | Lim Pek Har (PR–DAP) | 30,670 | 4% | 90% | 5% | | 24,854 | 81.0% | 265 | 0.9% |
| N33 | Tronoh | Paul Yong Choo Kiong (PR–DAP) | 13,243 | 64.1% | Yip Sze Choy (BN–MCA) | 7,052 | 34.2% | 6,191 | V. Sivakumar (PR–DAP) | 26,885 | 23% | 63% | 14% | | 20,646 | 76.8% | 351 | 1.3% |
| N34 | Bukit Chandan | Maslin Sham Razman (BN–UMNO) | 7,050 | 52.5% | Fathmawaty Salim (PR–PKR) | 6,091 | 45.3% | 959 | Wan Mohammad Khair-il Anuar Wan Ahmad (BN–UMNO) | 15,979 | 67% | 24% | 7% | | 13,434 | 84.1% | 238 | 1.5% |
| N34 | Bukit Chandan | Maslin Sham Razman (BN–UMNO) | 7,050 | 52.5% | Jahiddin Isa (IND) | 55 | 0.4% | 959 | Wan Mohammad Khair-il Anuar Wan Ahmad (BN–UMNO) | 15,979 | 67% | 24% | 7% | | 13,434 | 84.1% | 238 | 1.5% |
| N35 | Manong | Mohamad Kamil Shafie (BN–UMNO) | 7,405 | 50.1% | Jamil Dzulkarnain (PR–PAS) | 7,174 | 48.6% | 231 | Ramly Zahari (BN–UMNO) | 17,561 | 69% | 24% | 7% | | 14,766 | 84.1% | 187 | 1.1% |
| N36 | Pengkalan Baharu | Abdul Manaf Hashim (BN–UMNO) | 8,281 | 57.6% | Khairuddin Abd Malik (PR–PAS) | 5,776 | 40.1% | 2,505 | Hamdi Abu Bakar (BN–UMNO) | 17,459 | 67% | 23% | 10% | | 14,388 | 82.4% | 233 | 1.3% |
| N36 | Pengkalan Baharu | Abdul Manaf Hashim (BN–UMNO) | 8,281 | 57.6% | Ahmad Nizam Ibrahim (IND) | 98 | 0.7% | 2,505 | Hamdi Abu Bakar (BN–UMNO) | 17,459 | 67% | 23% | 10% | | 14,388 | 82.4% | 233 | 1.3% |
| N37 | Pantai Remis | Wong May Ing (PR–DAP) | 17,092 | 68.0% | Koh Ser Yun (BN–MCA) | 7,621 | 30.3% | 9,471 | Nga Kor Ming (PR–DAP) | 31,746 | 14% | 68% | 17% | | 25,132 | 79.2% | 419 | 1.3% |
| N38 | Belanja | Mohd Nizar Zakaria (BN–UMNO) | 7,691 | 60.8% | Najihatussalehah Ahmad (PR–PAS) | 4,728 | 37.4% | 2,963 | Mohd Zaim Abu Hasan (BN–UMNO) | 15,010 | 87% | 6% | 6% | | 12,643 | 84.2% | 224 | 1.5% |
| N39 | Bota | Nasarudin Hashim (BN–UMNO) | 9,504 | 57.0% | Zulkifly Ibrahim (PR–PKR) | 6,056 | 38.1% | 3,448 | Nasarudin Hashim (BN–UMNO) | 18,493 | 97% | | | 2% | 15,897 | 86.0% | 337 | 1.8% |
| N40 | Malim Nawar | Leong Cheok Keng (PR–DAP) | 11,296 | 60.9% | Chang Gwo Chyang (BN–MCA) | 6,953 | 37.5% | 4,343 | Keshvinder Singh (BN-PPP) | 24,615 | 20% | 71% | 8% | | 18,553 | 75.4% | 304 | 1.2% |
| N41 | Keranji | Chen Fook Chye (PR–DAP) | 10,671 | 66.8% | Daniel Wa Wai How (BN–MCA) | 5,110 | 32.0% | 5,561 | Chen Fook Chye (PR–DAP) | 21,111 | 13% | 76% | 10% | | 15,986 | 75.7% | 205 | 1.0% |
| N42 | Tualang Sekah | Nolee Ashilin Mohamed Radzi (BN–UMNO) | 7,955 | 54.4% | Baldip Singh Santokh Singh (PR–PKR) | 5,909 | 40.4% | 2,046 | Nolee Ashilin Mohamed Radzi (BN–UMNO) | 17,893 | 61% | 28% | 11% | | 14,611 | 81.7% | 347 | 1.9% |
| N42 | Tualang Sekah | Nolee Ashilin Mohamed Radzi (BN–UMNO) | 7,955 | 54.4% | Syed Mohamed Syed Ali (IND) | 400 | 2.7% | 2,046 | Nolee Ashilin Mohamed Radzi (BN–UMNO) | 17,893 | 61% | 28% | 11% | | 14,611 | 81.7% | 347 | 1.9% |
| N43 | Sungai Rapat | Radzi Zainon (PR–PAS) | 19,240 | 52.5% | Hamidah Osman (BN–UMNO) | 16,602 | 45.3% | 2,638 | Hamidah Osman (BN–UMNO) | 42,873 | 59% | 31% | 10% | | 36,635 | 85.5% | 460 | 1.1% |
| N43 | Sungai Rapat | Radzi Zainon (PR–PAS) | 19,240 | 52.5% | Mior Azman Aminuddin Mior Aris (IND) | 333 | 0.9% | 2,638 | Hamidah Osman (BN–UMNO) | 42,873 | 59% | 31% | 10% | | 36,635 | 85.5% | 460 | 1.1% |
| N44 | Simpang Pulai | Tan Kar Hing (PR–PKR) | 18,780 | 70.1% | Chang Kon You (BN–MCA) | 7,697 | 28.7% | 11,083 | Chan Ming Kai (PR–PKR) | 32,101 | 30% | 64% | 6% | | 26,780 | 83.4% | 303 | 0.9% |
| N45 | Teja | Chang Lih Kang (PR–PKR) | 9,732 | 54.5% | Yew Sau Kham (BN–MCA) | 7,650 | 42.9% | 2,082 | Chang Lih Kang (PR–PKR) | 22,118 | 32% | 50% | 10% | | 17,846 | 80.7% | 464 | 2.1% |
| N46 | Chenderiang | Mah Hang Soon (BN–MCA) | 10,866 | 62.1% | Amani Williams-Hunt Abdullah (PR–PKR) | 6,099 | 34.9% | 4,767 | Mah Hang Soon (BN–MCA) | 21,750 | 36% | 31% | 21% | | 17,490 | 80.4% | 525 | 2.4% |
| N47 | Ayer Kuning | Samsudin Abu Hassan (BN–UMNO) | 11,094 | 57.3% | Ahmad Razi Othman (PR–PAS) | 7,609 | 39.3% | 3,485 | Samsudin Abu Hassan (BN–UMNO) | 23,735 | 56% | 25% | 14% | | 19,353 | 81.5% | 353 | 1.5% |
| N47 | Ayer Kuning | Samsudin Abu Hassan (BN–UMNO) | 11,094 | 57.3% | Kathiravan Murugan (IND) | 297 | 1.5% | 3,485 | Samsudin Abu Hassan (BN–UMNO) | 23,735 | 56% | 25% | 14% | | 19,353 | 81.5% | 353 | 1.5% |
| N48 | Sungai Manik | Zainol Fadzi Paharudin (BN–UMNO) | 11,047 | 53.2% | Osman Abdul Rahman (PR–PKR) | 9,193 | 44.3% | 1,854 | Zainol Padzi Paharudin (BN–UMNO) | 25,028 | 65% | 27% | 5% | | 20,756 | 82.9% | 516 | 2.1% |
| N49 | Kampong Gajah | Abdullah Fauzi Ahmad Razali (BN–UMNO) | 14,140 | 62.5% | Ishak Saari (PR–PAS) | 8,040 | 35.5% | 6,100 | Wan Norashikin Wan Noordin (BN–UMNO) | 26,470 | 93% | | 3% | 4% | 22,620 | 85.5% | 440 | 1.7% |
| N50 | Sitiawan | Ngeh Koo Ham (PR–DAP) | 17,292 | 74.9% | Ting Tai Fook (BN–MCA) | 5,472 | 23.7% | 11,820 | Ngeh Khoo Ham (PR–DAP) | 28,546 | 13% | 74% | 12% | | 23,098 | 80.9% | 334 | 1.2% |
| N51 | Pasir Panjang | Rashidi Ibrahim (BN–UMNO) | 15,153 | 49.3% | Rohawati Abidin (PR–PAS) | 14,849 | 48.3% | 304 | Mohammad Nizar Jamaluddin (PR–PAS) | 35,940 | 69% | 13% | 18% | | 30,712 | 85.5% | 465 | 1.3% |
| N51 | Pasir Panjang | Rashidi Ibrahim (BN–UMNO) | 15,153 | 49.3% | Vijayan Subramaniam (IND) | 245 | 0.8% | 304 | Mohammad Nizar Jamaluddin (PR–PAS) | 35,940 | 69% | 13% | 18% | | 30,712 | 85.5% | 465 | 1.3% |
| N52 | Pangkor | Zambry Abdul Kadir (BN–UMNO) | 12,291 | 62.2% | Mohd Saifullah Mohd Zulkifli (PR–PKR) | 7,167 | 36.3% | 5,124 | Zambry Abdul Kadir (BN–UMNO) | 23,814 | 70% | 23% | 4% | | 19,763 | 82.8% | 254 | 1.1% |
| N52 | Pangkor | Zambry Abdul Kadir (BN–UMNO) | 12,291 | 62.2% | Bernard Parenpa John Parenpa Pall Raj (IND) | 51 | 0.3% | 5,124 | Zambry Abdul Kadir (BN–UMNO) | 23,814 | 70% | 23% | 4% | | 19,763 | 82.8% | 254 | 1.1% |
| N53 | Rungkup | Shahrul Zaman Yahya (BN–UMNO) | 6,415 | 51.4% | Mohd Misbahul Munir Masduki (PR–PAS) | 5,802 | 46.5% | 613 | Sha'arani Mohamad (BN–UMNO) | 15,287 | 66% | 23% | 9% | | 12,484 | 81.7% | 267 | 1.7% |
| N54 | Hutan Melintang | Kesavan Subramaniam (PR–PKR) | 10,155 | 49.6% | Supramaniam Ramalingam (BN–MIC) | 8,915 | 43.5% | 1,240 | Kesavan Subramaniam (PR–PKR) | 24,637 | 49% | 18% | 32% | | 20,472 | 83.1% | 636 | 2.6% |
| N54 | Hutan Melintang | Kesavan Subramaniam (PR–PKR) | 10,155 | 49.6% | Mat Sidi Hashim (IND) | 413 | 2.0% | 1,240 | Kesavan Subramaniam (PR–PKR) | 24,637 | 49% | 18% | 32% | | 20,472 | 83.1% | 636 | 2.6% |
| N54 | Hutan Melintang | Kesavan Subramaniam (PR–PKR) | 10,155 | 49.6% | Azahari Abdullah (BERJASA) | 353 | 1.7% | 1,240 | Kesavan Subramaniam (PR–PKR) | 24,637 | 49% | 18% | 32% | | 20,472 | 83.1% | 636 | 2.6% |
| N55 | Pasir Bedamar | Terence Naidu (PR–DAP) | 18,860 | 75.5% | M. Kayveas (BN–PPP) | 5,823 | 23.3% | 13,037 | Seah Leong Peng (PR–DAP) | 31,411 | 17% | 69% | 14% | | 24,964 | 79.5% | 281 | 0.9% |
| N56 | Changkat Jong | Mohd Azhar Jamaluddin (BN–UMNO) | 12,065 | 50.9% | Mohd Anuar Sudin (PR–PAS) | 10,947 | 46.2% | 1,118 | Mohd Anuar Sudin (PR–PAS) | 29,072 | 62% | 13% | 24% | | 23,716 | 81.6% | 435 | 1.5% |
| N56 | Changkat Jong | Mohd Azhar Jamaluddin (BN–UMNO) | 12,065 | 50.9% | Suppan Krishnan (IND) | 269 | 1.1% | 1,118 | Mohd Anuar Sudin (PR–PAS) | 29,072 | 62% | 13% | 24% | | 23,716 | 81.6% | 435 | 1.5% |
| N57 | Sungkai | Sivanesan Achalingam (PR–DAP) | 9,314 | 60.5% | Goh Kim Swee (BN–MCA) | 5,803 | 37.7% | 3,511 | Sivanesan Achalingam (PR–DAP) | 19,285 | 23% | 54% | 19% | | 15,393 | 79.8% | 276 | 1.4% |
| N58 | Slim | Mohd. Khusairi Abdul Talib (BN–UMNO) | 11,152 | 58.8% | Aminuddin Zulkipli (PR–PAS) | 7,299 | 38.5% | 3,853 | Mohd Khusairi Abdul Talib (BN–UMNO) | 22,320 | 76% | 10% | 11% | | 18,954 | 84.9% | 303 | 1.4% |
| N58 | Slim | Mohd. Khusairi Abdul Talib (BN–UMNO) | 11,152 | 58.8% | Mosses Ramiah (IND) | 200 | 1.1% | 3,853 | Mohd Khusairi Abdul Talib (BN–UMNO) | 22,320 | 76% | 10% | 11% | | 18,954 | 84.9% | 303 | 1.4% |
| N59 | Behrang | Rusnah Kassim (BN–UMNO) | 9,823 | 52.0% | Abdul Hadi Abdul Khatab (PR–PKR) | 7,855 | 41.6% | 1,968 | Jamaluddin Mohd Radzi (IND) | 22,894 | 56% | 21% | 12% | | 18,873 | 82.4% | 496 | 2.2% |
| N59 | Behrang | Rusnah Kassim (BN–UMNO) | 9,823 | 52.0% | Kamal Badri Tak M Zainudin (IND) | 358 | 1.9% | 1,968 | Jamaluddin Mohd Radzi (IND) | 22,894 | 56% | 21% | 12% | | 18,873 | 82.4% | 496 | 2.2% |
| N59 | Behrang | Rusnah Kassim (BN–UMNO) | 9,823 | 52.0% | Ramnaidu Suridemudu (IND) | 341 | 1.8% | 1,968 | Jamaluddin Mohd Radzi (IND) | 22,894 | 56% | 21% | 12% | | 18,873 | 82.4% | 496 | 2.2% |

== Pahang ==
For more details on Pelan dan Helaian Mata (Scoresheet) Bahagian Pilihan Raya Negeri Pahang, see footnote

| # | Constituency | Winner | Votes | Votes % | Opponent(s) | Votes | Votes % | Majority | Incumbent | Eligible voters | Malay voters | Chinese voters | Indian voters | Others voters | Voter turnout | Voter turnout % | Spoilt votes | Spoilt votes % |
|---|---|---|---|---|---|---|---|---|---|---|---|---|---|---|---|---|---|---|
| N01 | Tanah Rata | Leong Ngah Ngah (PR–DAP) | 7,878 | 59.0% | Ho Yip Kap (BN–Gerakan) | 4,734 | 35.4% | 3,144 | Ho Yip Kap (BN–Gerakan) | 16,796 | | 54% | 20% | 14% | 13,360 | 79.5% | 340 | 2.0% |
| N01 | Tanah Rata | Leong Ngah Ngah (PR–DAP) | 7,878 | 59.0% | Cheam May Choo (IND) | 408 | 3.1% | 3,144 | Ho Yip Kap (BN–Gerakan) | 16,796 | | 54% | 20% | 14% | 13,360 | 79.5% | 340 | 2.0% |
| N02 | Jelai | Wan Rosdy Wan Ismail (BN–UMNO) | 5,919 | 63.0% | Abdul Karim Nor (PR–PAS) | 2,737 | 29.1% | 3,182 | Wan Rosdy Wan Ismail (BN–UMNO) | 11,184 | 66% | | 1% | 33% | 9,390 | 83.9% | 396 | 3.5% |
| N02 | Jelai | Wan Rosdy Wan Ismail (BN–UMNO) | 5,919 | 63.0% | Alagu Thangarajoo (IND) | 338 | 3.6% | 3,182 | Wan Rosdy Wan Ismail (BN–UMNO) | 11,184 | 66% | | 1% | 33% | 9,390 | 83.9% | 396 | 3.5% |
| N03 | Padang Tengku | Mustapa Long (BN–UMNO) | 6,124 | 58.3% | Roslan Zainal (PR–PAS) | 4,210 | 40.1% | 1,914 | Abdul Rahman Mohamad (BN–UMNO) | 12,096 | 92% | 3% | 4% | | 10,497 | 86.8% | 163 | 1.3% |
| N04 | Cheka | Fong Koong Fuee (BN–MCA) | 5,324 | 55.0% | Abas Awang (PR–PKR) | 4,139 | 42.8% | 1,185 | Fong Koong Fuee (BN–MCA) | 11,920 | 70% | 24% | 5% | | 9,674 | 81.2% | 211 | 1.8% |
| N05 | Benta | Mohd. Soffi Abd. Razak (BN–UMNO) | 3,833 | 55.9% | Rizal Jamin (PR–PKR) | 2,932 | 42.8% | 901 | Mohd Soffi Abd Razak (BN–UMNO) | 8,308 | 62% | 28% | 10% | | 6,858 | 82.5% | 93 | 1.1% |
| N06 | Batu Talam | Abd. Aziz Mat Kiram (BN–UMNO) | 7,852 | 66.3% | Khairul Hakimin Mohd Ali (PR–PKR) | 3,715 | 31.3% | 4,137 | Abd Aziz Mat Kiram (BN–UMNO) | 14,016 | 78% | 10% | | 8% | 11,851 | 84.6% | 284 | 2.0% |
| N07 | Tras | Choong Siew Onn (PR–DAP) | 12,777 | 67.0% | Wing Lay Hiang (BN–MCA) | 6,015 | 31.5% | 6,762 | Choong Siew Onn (PR–DAP) | 23,485 | 24% | 64% | 10% | | 19,082 | 81.3% | 290 | 1.2% |
| N08 | Dong | Shahiruddin Ab Moin (BN–UMNO) | 7,093 | 50.6% | Tengku Shah Amir Tengku Perang (PR–PAS) | 6,612 | 47.2% | 481 | Shahiruddin Ab Moin (BN–UMNO) | 16,713 | 62% | 33% | 3% | | 14,011 | 83.8% | 306 | 1.8% |
| N09 | Tahan | Wan Amizan Wan Abdul Razak (BN–UMNO) | 6,200 | 53.6% | Mohd Zakhwan Ahmad Badarddin (PR–PAS) | 5,110 | 44.2% | 1,090 | Wan Amizan Wan Abdul Razak (BN–UMNO) | 13,584 | 94% | 1% | | 4% | 11,565 | 85.1% | 255 | 1.9% |
| N10 | Damak | Lau Lee (BN–MCA) | 7,905 | 41.6% | Koh Boon Heng (IND) | 7,841 | 41.3% | 64 | Lau Lee (BN–MCA) | 22,877 | 57% | 34% | 6% | | 19,002 | 83.1% | 647 | 2.8% |
| N10 | Damak | Lau Lee (BN–MCA) | 7,905 | 41.6% | Jamaluddin Abd Rahim (PR–PKR) | 2,435 | 12.8% | 64 | Lau Lee (BN–MCA) | 22,877 | 57% | 34% | 6% | | 19,002 | 83.1% | 647 | 2.8% |
| N10 | Damak | Lau Lee (BN–MCA) | 7,905 | 41.6% | Mohd Nor Jaafar (IND) | 174 | 0.9% | 64 | Lau Lee (BN–MCA) | 22,877 | 57% | 34% | 6% | | 19,002 | 83.1% | 647 | 2.8% |
| N11 | Pulau Tawar | Ahmad Shukri Ismail (BN–UMNO) | 11,048 | 58.5% | Yohanis Ahmad (PR–PAS) | 7,552 | 40.0% | 3,496 | Ahmad Shukri Ismail (BN–UMNO) | 21,903 | 99% | | 1% | | 18,895 | 86.3% | 295 | 1.3% |
| N12 | Beserah | Andansura Rabu (PR–PAS) | 15,346 | 56.8% | Mohd Hazmi Yusof (BN–UMNO) | 11,359 | 42.1% | 3,987 | Syed Mohammed Tuan Lonnik (PR–PAS) | 31,685 | 73% | 24% | 3% | | 27,010 | 85.2% | 305 | 1.0% |
| N13 | Semambu | Lee Chean Chung (PR–PKR) | 14,753 | 53.6% | Pang Tsu Ming (BN–MCA) | 11,553 | 42.0% | 3,200 | Pang Tsu Ming (BN–MCA) | 32,534 | 57% | 33% | 9% | | 27,518 | 84.6% | 327 | 1.0% |
| N13 | Semambu | Lee Chean Chung (PR–PKR) | 14,753 | 53.6% | Mohd Shukri Mohd Ramli (IND) | 885 | 3.2% | 3,200 | Pang Tsu Ming (BN–MCA) | 32,534 | 57% | 33% | 9% | | 27,518 | 84.6% | 327 | 1.0% |
| N14 | Teruntum | Sim Chon Siang (PR–PKR) | 12,385 | 60.0% | Chang Hong Seong (BN–MCA) | 7,948 | 38.5% | 4,437 | Chang Hong Seong (BN–MCA) | 25,098 | 37% | 56% | 6% | | 20,650 | 82.3% | 317 | 1.3% |
| N15 | Tanjung Lumpur | Rosli Abdul Jabar (PR–PAS) | 9,090 | 51.6% | T Zulkifly T Ahmad (BN–UMNO) | 8,294 | 47.1% | 796 | Wan Adnan Wan Mamat (BN–UMNO) | 20,493 | 77% | 19% | 3% | | 17,619 | 86.0% | 235 | 1.1% |
| N16 | Inderapura | Shafik Fauzan Sharif (BN–UMNO) | 5,644 | 59.7% | Syed Mohd Anis Syed Husain (PR–PAS) | 3,700 | 39.1% | 1,944 | Shafik Fauzan Sharif (BN–UMNO) | 10,689 | 93% | 5% | | 1% | 9,457 | 88.5% | 113 | 1.3% |
| N17 | Sungai Lembing | Md Sohaimi Mohamed Shah (BN–UMNO) | 7,042 | 60.4% | Sulaiman Md Derus (PR–PAS) | 4,451 | 38.2% | 2,591 | Md Sohaimi Mohamed Shah (BN–UMNO) | 13,751 | 83% | 14% | | 2% | 11,662 | 84.8% | 169 | 1.2% |
| N18 | Lepar | Mohd Shohaimi Jusoh (BN–UMNO) | 8,022 | 63.6% | Jefri Jaafar Tukemin (PR–PKR) | 4,306 | 34.1% | 3,716 | Mohd Shohaimi Jusoh (BN–UMNO) | 15,044 | 76% | 19% | | 3% | 12,612 | 83.8% | 219 | 1.5% |
| N18 | Lepar | Mohd Shohaimi Jusoh (BN–UMNO) | 8,022 | 63.6% | Kamarzaman Mohamed Yunus (IND) | 65 | 0.5% | 3,716 | Mohd Shohaimi Jusoh (BN–UMNO) | 15,044 | 76% | 19% | | 3% | 12,612 | 83.8% | 219 | 1.5% |
| N19 | Panching | Mohd Zaili Besar (BN–UMNO) | 8,657 | 52.7% | Yusof Embong (PR–PAS) | 7,621 | 46.4% | 1,036 | Mohd Zaili Besar (BN–UMNO) | 19,272 | 84% | 12% | 3% | | 16,439 | 85.3% | 161 | 0.8% |
| N20 | Pulau Manis | Khairuddin Mahmud (BN–UMNO) | 10,733 | 66.7% | Othman Bakar (PR–PAS) | 5,137 | 31.9% | 5,596 | Khairuddin Mahmud (BN–UMNO) | 18,848 | 92% | 3% | | 5% | 16,081 | 85.3% | 211 | 1.1% |
| N21 | Peramu Jaya | Sh Mohamed Puzi Sh Ali (BN–UMNO) | 15,769 | 64.2% | Abu Kassim Manaf (PR–PAS) | 8,142 | 33.2% | 7,627 | Ibrahim Awang Ismail (BN–UMNO) | 28,720 | 92% | 4% | | 3% | 24,555 | 85.5% | 411 | 1.4% |
| N21 | Peramu Jaya | Sh Mohamed Puzi Sh Ali (BN–UMNO) | 15,769 | 64.2% | Syed Mohammad Faiz Syed Azemmant (IND) | 233 | 0.9% | 7,627 | Ibrahim Awang Ismail (BN–UMNO) | 28,720 | 92% | 4% | | 3% | 24,555 | 85.5% | 411 | 1.4% |
| N22 | Bebar | Mohd. Fakhruddin Mohd. Arif (BN–UMNO) | 8,846 | 78.4% | Mohd Jafri Ab Rashid (PR–PKR) | 2,131 | 18.9% | 6,715 | Ishak Muhamad (BN–UMNO) | 13,445 | 70% | | 1% | 28% | 11,290 | 84.0% | 313 | 2.3% |
| N23 | Chini | Abu Bakar Harun (BN–UMNO) | 11,829 | 72.6% | Sitarunisah Ab Kadir (PR–PKR) | 4,154 | 25.5% | 7,675 | Abu Bakar Harun (BN–UMNO) | 19,247 | 92% | | | 8% | 16,286 | 84.6% | 303 | 1.6% |
| N24 | Luit | Nurhidayah Mohd Shahami (BN–UMNO) | 4,631 | 49.6% | M. Shahrul Nizam Abdul Haliff (PR–PAS) | 4,230 | 45.3% | 401 | Ahmad Munawar Abdul Jalil (BN–UMNO) | 11,206 | 81% | 15% | | 3% | 9,335 | 83.3% | 212 | 1.9% |
| N24 | Luit | Nurhidayah Mohd Shahami (BN–UMNO) | 4,631 | 49.6% | Khairul Nizam Abdul Majid (IND) | 262 | 2.8% | 401 | Ahmad Munawar Abdul Jalil (BN–UMNO) | 11,206 | 81% | 15% | | 3% | 9,335 | 83.3% | 212 | 1.9% |
| N25 | Kuala Sentul | Shahaniza Shamsuddin (BN–UMNO) | 6,901 | 64.3% | Mohamad Razali Ithnain (PR–PKR) | 3,608 | 33.6% | 3,293 | Shahaniza Shamsuddin (BN–UMNO) | 12,817 | 90% | 6% | 2% | | 10,738 | 83.8% | 229 | 1.8% |
| N26 | Chenor | Mohamed Arifin Awang Ismail (BN–UMNO) | 7,292 | 58.2% | Hasenan Haron (PR–PAS) | 4,983 | 39.8% | 2,309 | Tan Mohd Aminuddin Ishak (BN–UMNO) | 14,413 | 97% | | 1% | 1% | 12,525 | 86.9% | 250 | 1.7% |
| N27 | Jenderak | Mohamed Jaafar (BN–UMNO) | 5,047 | 61.3% | Suhaimi Said (PR–PKR) | 2,865 | 34.8% | 2,182 | Mohamed Jaafar (BN–UMNO) | 9,728 | 70% | 9% | | 16% | 8,228 | 84.6% | 222 | 2.3% |
| N27 | Jenderak | Mohamed Jaafar (BN–UMNO) | 5,047 | 61.3% | Pariruddin Muhamed Amin (IND) | 94 | 1.1% | 2,182 | Mohamed Jaafar (BN–UMNO) | 9,728 | 70% | 9% | | 16% | 8,228 | 84.6% | 222 | 2.3% |
| N28 | Kerdau | Syed Ibrahim Syed Ahmad (BN–UMNO) | 5,912 | 62.4% | Kamal Ashaari (PR–PAS) | 3,399 | 35.9% | 2,513 | Syed Ibrahim Syed Ahmad (BN–UMNO) | 10,801 | 89% | 4% | | 3% | 9,479 | 87.8% | 168 | 1.6% |
| N29 | Jengka | Wan Salman Wan Ismail (BN–UMNO) | 10,453 | 53.2% | Tuan Ibrahim Tuan Man (PR–PAS) | 9,150 | 46.6% | 1,303 | Wan Salman Wan Ismail (BN–UMNO) | 22,474 | 98% | | 2% | | 19,653 | 87.4% | 237 | 1.1% |
| N30 | Mentakab | Tengku Zulpuri Shah Raja Puji (PR–DAP) | 7,882 | 54.6% | Chuah Boon Seong (BN–MCA) | 6,328 | 43.9% | 1,554 | Chuah Boon Seong (BN–MCA) | 16,991 | 52% | 40% | 6% | | 14,430 | 84.9% | 220 | 1.3% |
| N31 | Lanchang | Mohd Sharkar Shamsudin (BN–UMNO) | 10,393 | 51.4% | Ahmad Nizam Hamid (PR–PKR) | 9,266 | 45.9% | 1,127 | Mohd Sharkar Shamsuddin (BN–UMNO) | 23,624 | 58% | 21% | 16% | | 20,209 | 85.5% | 550 | 2.3% |
| N32 | Kuala Semantan | Syed Hamid Syed Mohamed (PR–PAS) | 12,101 | 55.5% | Mohammad Anuar Mohd Yunus (BN–UMNO) | 9,416 | 43.2% | 2,685 | Syed Hamid Syed Mohamed (PR–PAS) | 25,490 | 78% | 16% | 4% | | 21,802 | 85.5% | 285 | 1.1% |
| N33 | Bilut | Chow Yu Hui (PR–DAP) | 8,663 | 57.8% | Leong Kim Soon (BN–MCA) | 6,056 | 40.4% | 2,607 | Hoh Khai Mun (BN–MCA) | 17,680 | 33% | 57% | 9% | | 14,982 | 84.7% | 263 | 1.5% |
| N34 | Ketari | Lee Chin Chen (PR–DAP) | 10,050 | 55.0% | Wong Choo Yak (BN–MCA) | 7,910 | 43.3% | 2,140 | Ng Keong Chye (BN–GERAKAN) | 21,681 | 45% | 47% | 5% | | 18,276 | 84.3% | 316 | 1.5% |
| N35 | Sabai | Kamache Doray Rajoo (PR–DAP) | 4,439 | 49.3% | Goonasakaren Raman (BN–MIC) | 4,322 | 48.0% | 117 | Davendran Murthy (BN–MIC) | 10,868 | 36% | 40% | 20% | | 9,006 | 82.9% | 245 | 2.3% |
| N36 | Pelangai | Adnan Yaakob (BN–UMNO) | 6,245 | 61.0% | Abdul Hamid Bahatim (PR–PAS) | 3,770 | 36.8% | 2,475 | Adnan Yaakob (BN–UMNO) | 12,037 | 69% | 22% | 7% | | 10,242 | 85.1% | 227 | 1.9% |
| N37 | Guai | Norolazali Sulaiman (BN–UMNO) | 8,320 | 57.7% | Musaniff Ab Rahman (PR–PAS) | 5,922 | 41.1% | 2,398 | Norolazali Sulaiman (BN–UMNO) | 17,034 | 87% | 8% | | 4% | 14,426 | 84.7% | 184 | 1.1% |
| N38 | Triang | Leong Yu Man (PR–DAP) | 10,076 | 65.5% | Tan Tin Loon (BN–GERAKAN) | 5,067 | 32.9% | 5,009 | Leong Ngah Ngah (PR–DAP) | 18,527 | 26% | 69% | 4% | | 15,385 | 83.0% | 242 | 1.3% |
| N39 | Kemayan | Mohd Fadzil Osman (BN–UMNO) | 8,379 | 64.4% | Manolan Mohamad (PR–PKR) | 4,316 | 33.2% | 4,063 | Mohd Fadzil Osman (BN–UMNO) | 15,436 | 70% | 14% | | 11% | 13,005 | 84.3% | 310 | 2.0% |
| N40 | Bukit Ibam | Wan Kadri Wan Mahusain (BN–UMNO) | 10,931 | 64.7% | Shukri Ahmad (PR–PAS) | 5,465 | 32.3% | 5,466 | Mohamad Sahfri Ab Aziz (BN–UMNO) | 19,671 | 90% | | 1% | 8% | 16,897 | 85.9% | 265 | 1.3% |
| N40 | Bukit Ibam | Wan Kadri Wan Mahusain (BN–UMNO) | 10,931 | 64.7% | Ienan Kassim (IND) | 236 | 1.4% | 5,466 | Mohamad Sahfri Ab Aziz (BN–UMNO) | 19,671 | 90% | | 1% | 8% | 16,897 | 85.9% | 265 | 1.3% |
| N41 | Muadzam Shah | Maznah Mazlan (BN–UMNO) | 10,639 | 71.1% | Muhamad Nordin Po'Wan Chik (PR–PKR) | 3,935 | 26.3% | 6,704 | Maznah Mazlan (BN–UMNO) | 17,409 | 86% | | 2% | 11% | 14,973 | 86.0% | 399 | 2.3% |
| N42 | Tioman | Mohd. Johari Hussain (BN–UMNO) | 8,883 | 63.5% | Mohd Fadzli Mohd Ramly (PR–PAS) | 4,797 | 34.3% | 4,086 | Mohd Johari Hussain (BN–UMNO) | 16,516 | 85% | 7% | | 8% | 13,988 | 84.7% | 237 | 1.4% |
| N42 | Tioman | Mohd. Johari Hussain (BN–UMNO) | 8,883 | 63.5% | Mohd Zolfakar Taib (IND) | 71 | 0.5% | 4,086 | Mohd Johari Hussain (BN–UMNO) | 16,516 | 85% | 7% | | 8% | 13,988 | 84.7% | 237 | 1.4% |

== Selangor ==
For more details on Pelan dan Helaian Mata (Scoresheet) Bahagian Pilihan Raya Negeri Selangor, see footnote

| # | Constituency | Winner | Votes | Votes % | Opponent(s) | Votes | Votes % | Majority | Incumbent | Eligible voters | Malay voters | Chinese voters | Indian voters | Others voters | Voter turnout | Voter turnout % | Spoilt votes | Spoilt votes % |
|---|---|---|---|---|---|---|---|---|---|---|---|---|---|---|---|---|---|---|
| N01 | Sungai Air Tawar | Kamarol Zaki Abdul Malik (BN–UMNO) | 7,096 | 54.7% | Wahid Rais (PR–PAS) | 5,680 | 43.8% | 1,416 | Raja Ideris Raja Ahmad (BN–UMNO) | 15,187 | 83% | 12% | 3% | | 12,970 | 85.4% | 194 | 1.3% |
| N02 | Sabak | Sallehen Mukhyi (PR–PAS) | 9,421 | 50.3% | Abdul Halim Udin (BN–UMNO) | 9,022 | 48.1% | 399 | Warno Dogol (BN–UMNO) | 22,131 | 79% | 13% | 6% | | 18,742 | 84.7% | 299 | 1.4% |
| N03 | Sungai Panjang | Budiman Mohd Zohdi (BN–UMNO) | 12,606 | 53.9% | Fadzlin Taslimin (PR–PAS) | 10,423 | 44.5% | 2,183 | Mohamad Khir Toyo (BN–UMNO) | 26,590 | 82% | 15% | | 2% | 23,403 | 88.0% | 374 | 1.4% |
| N04 | Sekinchan | Ng Suee Lim (PR–DAP) | 8,107 | 56.8% | Kek Seng Hooi (BN–MCA) | 5,868 | 41.1% | 2,239 | Ng Suee Lim (PR–DAP) | 16,247 | 39% | 57% | 2% | | 14,274 | 87.9% | 299 | 1.8% |
| N05 | Hulu Bernam | Rosni Sohar (BN–UMNO) | 10,397 | 57.7% | Muhamad Idris Ahmad (PR–PAS) | 7,365 | 40.9% | 3,032 | Mohamed Idris Abu Bakar (BN–UMNO) | 20,933 | 68% | 17% | 14% | | 18,023 | 86.1% | 261 | 1.2% |
| N06 | Kuala Kubu Baharu | Lee Kee Hiong (PR–DAP) | 9,469 | 52.3% | Ooi Hui Wen (BN–MCA) | 7,767 | 42.9% | 1,702 | Wong Koon Mun (BN–MCA) | 21,186 | 33% | 43% | 21% | | 18,101 | 85.4% | 390 | 1.8% |
| N06 | Kuala Kubu Baharu | Lee Kee Hiong (PR–DAP) | 9,469 | 52.3% | Yoong Tham Fook (IND) | 250 | 1.4% | 1,702 | Wong Koon Mun (BN–MCA) | 21,186 | 33% | 43% | 21% | | 18,101 | 85.4% | 390 | 1.8% |
| N06 | Kuala Kubu Baharu | Lee Kee Hiong (PR–DAP) | 9,469 | 52.3% | Pritpal Singh Mender Singh (IND) | 117 | 0.6% | 1,702 | Wong Koon Mun (BN–MCA) | 21,186 | 33% | 43% | 21% | | 18,101 | 85.4% | 390 | 1.8% |
| N06 | Kuala Kubu Baharu | Lee Kee Hiong (PR–DAP) | 9,469 | 52.3% | Nadarajah Supramaniam (IND) | 108 | 0.6% | 1,702 | Wong Koon Mun (BN–MCA) | 21,186 | 33% | 43% | 21% | | 18,101 | 85.4% | 390 | 1.8% |
| N07 | Batang Kali | Mat Nadzari Ahmad Dahlan (BN–UMNO) | 21,189 | 54.7% | Ramachandran Kandasamy (PR–PKR) | 15,791 | 40.8% | 5,398 | Mohd Isa Abu Kasim (BN–UMNO) | 43,578 | 63% | 17% | 18% | | 38,735 | 88.9% | 545 | 1.3% |
| N07 | Batang Kali | Mat Nadzari Ahmad Dahlan (BN–UMNO) | 21,189 | 54.7% | Mustapa Kamal Sapingi (IND) | 734 | 1.9% | 5,398 | Mohd Isa Abu Kasim (BN–UMNO) | 43,578 | 63% | 17% | 18% | | 38,735 | 88.9% | 545 | 1.3% |
| N07 | Batang Kali | Mat Nadzari Ahmad Dahlan (BN–UMNO) | 21,189 | 54.7% | Mustaf Talib (IND) | 476 | 1.2% | 5,398 | Mohd Isa Abu Kasim (BN–UMNO) | 43,578 | 63% | 17% | 18% | | 38,735 | 88.9% | 545 | 1.3% |
| N08 | Sungai Burong | Mohd Shamsudin Lias (BN–UMNO) | 11,464 | 56.7% | Mohamad Judi Sarjo (PR–PAS) | 8,451 | 41.8% | 3,013 | Mohd Shamsudin Lias (BN–UMNO) | 22,697 | 85% | 12% | 3% | | 20,219 | 89.1% | 304 | 1.3% |
| N09 | Permatang | Sulaiman Abdul Razak (BN–UMNO) | 9,049 | 51.8% | Mohd Yahya Mat Sahri (PR–PKR) | 8,023 | 46.0% | 1,026 | Sulaiman Abdul Razak (BN–UMNO) | 19,636 | 58% | 22% | 18% | | 17,460 | 88.9% | 312 | 1.6% |
| N09 | Permatang | Sulaiman Abdul Razak (BN–UMNO) | 9,049 | 51.8% | Low Tan (IND) | 76 | 0.4% | 1,026 | Sulaiman Abdul Razak (BN–UMNO) | 19,636 | 58% | 22% | 18% | | 17,460 | 88.9% | 312 | 1.6% |
| N10 | Bukit Melawati | Jakiran Jacomah (BN–UMNO) | 7,296 | 51.8% | Manikavasagam Sundram (PR–PKR) | 6,490 | 46.1% | 806 | Muthiah Maria Pillay (PR–PKR) | 16,118 | 57% | 12% | 30% | | 14,080 | 87.4% | 294 | 1.8% |
| N11 | Ijok | Idris Ahmad (PR–PKR) | 8,522 | 51.3% | Parthiban Karuppiah (BN–MIC) | 7,783 | 46.9% | 739 | Abdul Khalid Ibrahim (PR–PKR) | 18,639 | 48% | 17% | 34% | | 16,602 | 89.1% | 297 | 1.6% |
| N12 | Jeram | Amiruddin Setro (BN–UMNO) | 13,632 | 55.0% | Muhammad Rashid Muhammad Kassim (PR–PAS) | 10,798 | 43.6% | 2,834 | Amiruddin Setro (BN–UMNO) | 27,541 | 78% | 12% | 9% | | 24,792 | 90.0% | 362 | 1.3% |
| N13 | Kuang | Abdul Shukur Idrus (BN–UMNO) | 11,027 | 51.5% | Tenku Maraziyah Tenku Sulaiman (PR–PKR) | 9,772 | 45.6% | 1,255 | Abdul Shukur Idrus (BN–UMNO) | 24,319 | 62% | 21% | 16% | | 21,410 | 88.0% | 378 | 1.6% |
| N13 | Kuang | Abdul Shukur Idrus (BN–UMNO) | 11,027 | 51.5% | Zahariman Abd Latip (IND) | 233 | 1.1% | 1,255 | Abdul Shukur Idrus (BN–UMNO) | 24,319 | 62% | 21% | 16% | | 21,410 | 88.0% | 378 | 1.6% |
| N14 | Rawang | Gan Pei Nei (PR–PKR) | 18,358 | 65.9% | Lee Li Yew (BN–MCA) | 9,117 | 32.7% | 9,241 | Gan Pei Nei (PR–PKR) | 32,208 | 23% | 50% | 25% | | 27,869 | 86.5% | 394 | 1.2% |
| N15 | Taman Templer | Zaidy Abdul Talib (PR–PAS) | 24,667 | 57.3% | Subahan Kamal (BN–UMNO) | 17,200 | 40.0% | 7,467 | Subahan Kamal (BN–UMNO) | 49,368 | 51% | 35% | 13% | | 43,028 | 87.2% | 666 | 1.3% |
| N15 | Taman Templer | Zaidy Abdul Talib (PR–PAS) | 24,667 | 57.3% | Roslan Basaruddin (IND) | 495 | 1.2% | 7,467 | Subahan Kamal (BN–UMNO) | 49,368 | 51% | 35% | 13% | | 43,028 | 87.2% | 666 | 1.3% |
| N16 | Batu Caves | Amirudin Shari (PR–PKR) | 14,552 | 55.0% | Rawisandran Narayan (BN–MIC) | 11,291 | 42.7% | 3,261 | Amirudin Shari (PR–PKR) | 30,869 | 60% | 14% | 24% | | 26,443 | 85.7% | 418 | 1.4% |
| N16 | Batu Caves | Amirudin Shari (PR–PKR) | 14,552 | 55.0% | Suman Gopal (IND) | 182 | 0.7% | 3,261 | Amirudin Shari (PR–PKR) | 30,869 | 60% | 14% | 24% | | 26,443 | 85.7% | 418 | 1.4% |
| N17 | Gombak Setia | Hasbullah Mohd Ridzwan (PR–PAS) | 20,757 | 51.6% | Said Anuar Said Ahmad (BN–UMNO) | 19,076 | 47.4% | 1,681 | Hasan Mohamed Ali (IND) | 46,285 | 77% | 12% | 9% | | 40,211 | 86.9% | 378 | 0.8% |
| N18 | Hulu Kelang | Saari Sungib (PR–PAS) | 21,310 | 53.1% | Abdul Rahim Pandak Kamarudin (BN–UMNO) | 18,429 | 46.0% | 2,881 | Saari Sungib (PR–PAS) | 46,136 | 80% | 14% | 4% | | 40,099 | 86.9% | 360 | 0.8% |
| N19 | Bukit Antarabangsa | Mohamed Azmin Ali (PR–PKR) | 16,502 | 56.4% | Mohamad Nadzim Ibrahim (BN–UMNO) | 12,458 | 42.6% | 4,044 | Mohamed Azmin Ali (PR–PKR) | 34,467 | 57% | 36% | 6% | | 29,264 | 84.9% | 304 | 0.9% |
| N20 | Lembah Jaya | Khasim Abdul Aziz (PR–PAS) | 25,185 | 59.8% | Baderisham Jolly (BN–UMNO) | 16,472 | 39.1% | 8,713 | Khasim Abdul Aziz (PR–PAS) | 48,668 | 54% | 32% | 13% | | 42,126 | 86.6% | 469 | 1.0% |
| N21 | Chempaka | Iskandar Abdul Samad (PR–PAS) | 23,117 | 62.4% | Muhammad Faizal Sufar (BN–UMNO) | 13,509 | 36.5% | 9,608 | Iskandar Abdul Samad (PR–PAS) | 42,995 | 58% | 36% | 6% | | 37,058 | 86.2% | 432 | 1.0% |
| N22 | Teratai | Tiew Way Keng (PR–DAP) | 23,578 | 65.5% | Liew Pok Boon (BN–GERAKAN) | 9,932 | 27.6% | 13,646 | Lee Ying Ha (PR–DAP) | 40,862 | 35% | 59% | 6% | | 36,019 | 88.1% | 501 | 1.2% |
| N22 | Teratai | Tiew Way Keng (PR–DAP) | 23,578 | 65.5% | Lee Ying Ha (IND) | 1,832 | 5.1% | 13,646 | Lee Ying Ha (PR–DAP) | 40,862 | 35% | 59% | 6% | | 36,019 | 88.1% | 501 | 1.2% |
| N22 | Teratai | Tiew Way Keng (PR–DAP) | 23,578 | 65.5% | Chin Kok Keong (IND) | 115 | 0.3% | 13,646 | Lee Ying Ha (PR–DAP) | 40,862 | 35% | 59% | 6% | | 36,019 | 88.1% | 501 | 1.2% |
| N22 | Teratai | Tiew Way Keng (PR–DAP) | 23,578 | 65.5% | Lim Ah Chai (IND) | 61 | 0.2% | 13,646 | Lee Ying Ha (PR–DAP) | 40,862 | 35% | 59% | 6% | | 36,019 | 88.1% | 501 | 1.2% |
| N23 | Dusun Tua | Razaly Hassan (PR–PAS) | 22,161 | 54.5% | Ismail Sani (BN–UMNO) | 18,090 | 44.5% | 4,071 | Ismail Sani (BN–UMNO) | 46,038 | 53% | 37% | 7% | | 40,689 | 88.4% | 438 | 1.0% |
| N24 | Semenyih | Johan Abd Aziz (BN–UMNO) | 17,922 | 48.0% | Hamidi A. Hassan (PR–PKR) | 13,165 | 35.2% | 4,757 | Johan Abd Aziz (BN–UMNO) | 42,344 | 56% | 25% | 17% | | 37,356 | 88.2% | 701 | 1.7% |
| N24 | Semenyih | Johan Abd Aziz (BN–UMNO) | 17,922 | 48.0% | Arutchelvan Subramaniams (PSM) | 5,568 | 14.9% | 4,757 | Johan Abd Aziz (BN–UMNO) | 42,344 | 56% | 25% | 17% | | 37,356 | 88.2% | 701 | 1.7% |
| N25 | Kajang | Lee Chin Cheh (PR–PKR) | 19,571 | 57.1% | Lee Ban Seng (BN–MCA) | 12,747 | 37.2% | 6,824 | Lee Kim Sin (PR–PKR) | 38,965 | 48% | 41% | 10% | | 34,290 | 88.0% | 541 | 1.4% |
| N25 | Kajang | Lee Chin Cheh (PR–PKR) | 19,571 | 57.1% | Mohamad Ismail (BERJASA) | 1,014 | 3.0% | 6,824 | Lee Kim Sin (PR–PKR) | 38,965 | 48% | 41% | 10% | | 34,290 | 88.0% | 541 | 1.4% |
| N25 | Kajang | Lee Chin Cheh (PR–PKR) | 19,571 | 57.1% | Mohd Iwan Jefrey Abdul Majid (IND) | 249 | 0.7% | 6,824 | Lee Kim Sin (PR–PKR) | 38,965 | 48% | 41% | 10% | | 34,290 | 88.0% | 541 | 1.4% |
| N25 | Kajang | Lee Chin Cheh (PR–PKR) | 19,571 | 57.1% | Ong Yan Foo (IND) | 85 | 0.2% | 6,824 | Lee Kim Sin (PR–PKR) | 38,965 | 48% | 41% | 10% | | 34,290 | 88.0% | 541 | 1.4% |
| N25 | Kajang | Lee Chin Cheh (PR–PKR) | 19,571 | 57.1% | Mohd Khalid Kassim (IND) | 83 | 0.2% | 6,824 | Lee Kim Sin (PR–PKR) | 38,965 | 48% | 41% | 10% | | 34,290 | 88.0% | 541 | 1.4% |
| N26 | Bangi | Mohd Shafie Ngah (PR–PAS) | 29,200 | 62.1% | Mohd Zaidi Md Zain (BN–UMNO) | 17,362 | 36.9% | 11,838 | Shafie Abu Bakar (PR–PAS) | 53,268 | 66% | 19% | 13% | | 47,016 | 88.3% | 454 | 0.9% |
| N27 | Balakong | Eddie Ng Tien Chee (PR–DAP) | 25,126 | 66.3% | Lai Kwong Choy (BN–MCA) | 11,584 | 30.6% | 13,542 | Yap Lum Chin (PR–DAP) | 42,829 | 33% | 55% | 10% | | 37,911 | 88.5% | 548 | 1.3% |
| N27 | Balakong | Eddie Ng Tien Chee (PR–DAP) | 25,126 | 66.3% | Lee Ah Seng (IND) | 653 | 1.7% | 13,542 | Yap Lum Chin (PR–DAP) | 42,829 | 33% | 55% | 10% | | 37,911 | 88.5% | 548 | 1.3% |
| N28 | Seri Kembangan | Ean Yong Hian Wah (PR–DAP) | 27,406 | 82.7% | Chin Toong Kang (BN–MCA) | 5,328 | 16.1% | 22,078 | Ean Yong Hian Wah (PR–DAP) | 37,042 | 8% | 84% | 8% | | 33,121 | 89.4% | 387 | 1.0% |
| N29 | Seri Serdang | Noor Hanim Ismail (PR–PAS) | 39,737 | 62.1% | Mohamad Yusof Mohamed Yassin (BN–UMNO) | 23,486 | 36.7% | 16,251 | Mohamad Satim Diman (BN–UMNO) | 72,769 | 46% | 36% | 16% | | 64,021 | 88.0% | 798 | 1.1% |
| N30 | Kinrara | Ng Sze Han (PR–DAP) | 22,333 | 73.7% | Wong Hock Aun (BN–MCA) | 7,729 | 25.5% | 14,604 | Teresa Kok Suh Sim (PR–DAP) | 34,241 | 25% | 59% | 15% | | 30,315 | 88.5% | 253 | 0.7% |
| N31 | Subang Jaya | Hannah Yeoh Tseow Suan (PR–DAP) | 40,366 | 76.1% | Gan Meng Foo (BN–MCA) | 12,297 | 23.2% | 28,069 | Hannah Yeoh Tseow Suan (PR–DAP) | 61,688 | 29% | 57% | 12% | | 53,052 | 86.0% | 389 | 0.6% |
| N32 | Seri Setia | Nik Nazmi Nik Ahmad (PR–PKR) | 18,692 | 56.2% | Abdul Halim Samad (BN–UMNO) | 14,029 | 42.2% | 4,663 | Nik Nazmi Nik Ahmad (PR–PKR) | 39,548 | 51% | 18% | 29% | | 33,237 | 84.0% | 516 | 1.3% |
| N33 | Taman Medan | Haniza Mohamed Talha (PR–PKR) | 20,478 | 53.9% | Ab Wahab Ibrahim (BN–UMNO) | 16,747 | 44.1% | 3,731 | Haniza Mohamed Talha (PR–PKR) | 44,974 | 61% | 20% | 18% | | 38,008 | 84.5% | 494 | 1.1% |
| N33 | Taman Medan | Haniza Mohamed Talha (PR–PKR) | 20,478 | 53.9% | Kamarul Jaman Seeni Mohideen (IND) | 213 | 0.6% | 3,731 | Haniza Mohamed Talha (PR–PKR) | 44,974 | 61% | 20% | 18% | | 38,008 | 84.5% | 494 | 1.1% |
| N33 | Taman Medan | Haniza Mohamed Talha (PR–PKR) | 20,478 | 53.9% | Johan Asik (KITA) | 55 | 0.1% | 3,731 | Haniza Mohamed Talha (PR–PKR) | 44,974 | 61% | 20% | 18% | | 38,008 | 84.5% | 494 | 1.1% |
| N33 | Taman Medan | Haniza Mohamed Talha (PR–PKR) | 20,478 | 53.9% | Muhammad Zarqasyi Zulkarnain (IND) | 21 | 0.1% | 3,731 | Haniza Mohamed Talha (PR–PKR) | 44,974 | 61% | 20% | 18% | | 38,008 | 84.5% | 494 | 1.1% |
| N34 | Bukit Gasing | Rajiv Rishyakaran (PR–DAP) | 21,168 | 77.9% | Juan Sei Chang (BN–GERAKAN) | 5,326 | 19.6% | 15,842 | Vacant (none) | 34,584 | 13% | 69% | 15% | | 27,178 | 78.6% | 229 | 0.7% |
| N34 | Bukit Gasing | Rajiv Rishyakaran (PR–DAP) | 21,168 | 77.9% | Simon Lee Chung Hsin (IND) | 287 | 1.1% | 15,842 | Vacant (none) | 34,584 | 13% | 69% | 15% | | 27,178 | 78.6% | 229 | 0.7% |
| N34 | Bukit Gasing | Rajiv Rishyakaran (PR–DAP) | 21,168 | 77.9% | Mak Khuin Weng (IND) | 168 | 0.6% | 15,842 | Vacant (none) | 34,584 | 13% | 69% | 15% | | 27,178 | 78.6% | 229 | 0.7% |
| N35 | Kampung Tunku | Lau Weng San (PR–DAP) | 19,762 | 75.9% | Chong Seng Foo (BN–MCA) | 6,077 | 23.3% | 13,685 | Lau Weng San (PR–DAP) | 32,007 | 20% | 67% | 12% | | 26,042 | 81.4% | 203 | 0.6% |
| N36 | Damansara Utama | Yeo Bee Yin (PR–DAP) | 37,303 | 83.6% | Lim Choon Kin (BN–MCA) | 6,614 | 14.8% | 30,689 | Cheah Wing Yin (PR–DAP) | 53,394 | 11% | 84% | 5% | | 44,638 | 83.6% | 341 | 0.6% |
| N36 | Damansara Utama | Yeo Bee Yin (PR–DAP) | 37,303 | 83.6% | Liew Wei Beng (IND) | 380 | 0.9% | 30,689 | Cheah Wing Yin (PR–DAP) | 53,394 | 11% | 84% | 5% | | 44,638 | 83.6% | 341 | 0.6% |
| N37 | Bukit Lanjan | Elizabeth Wong Keat Ping (PR–PKR) | 25,808 | 74.3% | Chong Tuck Chiew (BN–GERAKAN) | 8,608 | 24.8% | 17,200 | Elizabeth Wong Keat Ping (PR–PKR) | 39,978 | 28% | 57% | 13% | | 34,752 | 86.9% | 336 | 0.8% |
| N38 | Paya Jaras | Mohd Khairuddin Othman (PR–PAS) | 21,808 | 56.5% | Muhammad Bushro Mat Johor (BN–UMNO) | 16,286 | 42.2% | 5,522 | Muhammad Bushro Mat Johor (BN–UMNO) | 43,617 | 57% | 30% | 11% | | 38,571 | 88.4% | 477 | 1.1% |
| N39 | Kota Damansara | Halimaton Saadiah Bohan (BN–UMNO) | 16,387 | 41.7% | Mohd Nasir Hashim (PR–PKR) | 14,860 | 37.8% | 1,527 | Mohd Nasir Hashim (PR–PKR) | 44,948 | 56% | 29% | 13% | | 39,313 | 87.5% | 542 | 1.2% |
| N39 | Kota Damansara | Halimaton Saadiah Bohan (BN–UMNO) | 16,387 | 41.7% | Ridzuan Ismail (PR–PAS) | 7,312 | 18.6% | 1,527 | Mohd Nasir Hashim (PR–PKR) | 44,948 | 56% | 29% | 13% | | 39,313 | 87.5% | 542 | 1.2% |
| N39 | Kota Damansara | Halimaton Saadiah Bohan (BN–UMNO) | 16,387 | 41.7% | Halmi Omar (IND) | 116 | 0.3% | 1,527 | Mohd Nasir Hashim (PR–PKR) | 44,948 | 56% | 29% | 13% | | 39,313 | 87.5% | 542 | 1.2% |
| N39 | Kota Damansara | Halimaton Saadiah Bohan (BN–UMNO) | 16,387 | 41.7% | Edros Abdullah (IND) | 57 | 0.1% | 1,527 | Mohd Nasir Hashim (PR–PKR) | 44,948 | 56% | 29% | 13% | | 39,313 | 87.5% | 542 | 1.2% |
| N39 | Kota Damansara | Halimaton Saadiah Bohan (BN–UMNO) | 16,387 | 41.7% | Suppiah Anandan (IND) | 39 | 0.1% | 1,527 | Mohd Nasir Hashim (PR–PKR) | 44,948 | 56% | 29% | 13% | | 39,313 | 87.5% | 542 | 1.2% |
| N40 | Kota Anggerik | Yaakob Sapari (PR–PKR) | 26,261 | 54.0% | Mohd Yusof Din (BN–UMNO) | 21,758 | 44.7% | 4,503 | Yaakob Sapari (PR–PKR) | 54,952 | 70% | 17% | 12% | | 48,625 | 88.5% | 470 | 0.9% |
| N40 | Kota Anggerik | Yaakob Sapari (PR–PKR) | 26,261 | 54.0% | Eriq Faisal Rusli (IND) | 136 | 0.3% | 4,503 | Yaakob Sapari (PR–PKR) | 54,952 | 70% | 17% | 12% | | 48,625 | 88.5% | 470 | 0.9% |
| N41 | Batu Tiga | Rodziah Ismail (PR–PKR) | 21,284 | 54.1% | Ahmad Nawawi M.Zin (BN–UMNO) | 17,479 | 44.5% | 3,805 | Rodziah Ismail (PR–PKR) | 45,005 | 69% | 12% | 17% | | 39,319 | 87.3% | 432 | 0.9% |
| N41 | Batu Tiga | Rodziah Ismail (PR–PKR) | 21,284 | 54.1% | Mohd Uzi Che Hussin (IND) | 124 | 0.3% | 3,805 | Rodziah Ismail (PR–PKR) | 45,005 | 69% | 12% | 17% | | 39,319 | 87.3% | 432 | 0.9% |
| N42 | Meru | Abd Rani Osman (PR–PAS) | 22,086 | 62.3% | Sukaiman Ahmad (BN–UMNO) | 13,007 | 36.7% | 9,079 | Abd Rani Osman (PR–PAS) | 39,457 | 59% | 27% | 12% | | 35,436 | 89.8% | 343 | 0.9% |
| N43 | Sementa | Daroyah Alwi (PR–PKR) | 21,520 | 60.1% | Md Shazali Md Amin (BN–UMNO) | 13,674 | 38.2% | 7,846 | Abd Rahman Palil (BN–UMNO) | 40,406 | 45% | 28% | 26% | | 35,801 | 88.6% | 425 | 1.0% |
| N43 | Sementa | Daroyah Alwi (PR–PKR) | 21,520 | 60.1% | Thuraisingam Subbrayan (IND) | 182 | 0.5% | 7,846 | Abd Rahman Palil (BN–UMNO) | 40,406 | 45% | 28% | 26% | | 35,801 | 88.6% | 425 | 1.0% |
| N44 | Sungai Pinang | Teng Chang Khim (PR–DAP) | 17,364 | 73.2% | Lee Siew Chee (BN–MCA) | 6,055 | 25.5% | 11,309 | Teng Chang Khim (PR–DAP) | 27,404 | 28% | 66% | 5% | | 23,710 | 86.2% | 291 | 1.0% |
| N45 | Selat Klang | Halimah Ali (PR–PAS) | 17,085 | 53.8% | Faisal Yahya (BN–UMNO) | 14,331 | 45.1% | 2,754 | Halimah Ali (PR–PAS) | 36,892 | 63% | 25% | 10% | | 31,776 | 85.4% | 360 | 1.1% |
| N46 | Pelabuhan Klang | Abdul Khalid Ibrahim (PR–PKR) | 18,591 | 53.4% | Nasarruddin M Zin (BN–UMNO) | 15,597 | 44.8% | 2,994 | Badrul Hisham Abdullah (PR–PKR) | 39,972 | 51% | 28% | 18% | | 34,784 | 87.0% | 596 | 1.5% |
| N47 | Pandamaran | Eric Tan Pok Shyong (PR–DAP) | 16,311 | 67.7% | Ching Eu Boon (BN–MCA) | 7,135 | 29.6% | 9,176 | Ronnie Liu Tian Khiew (PR–DAP) | 27,594 | 23% | 59% | 16% | | 24,089 | 87.3% | 365 | 1.3% |
| N47 | Pandamaran | Eric Tan Pok Shyong (PR–DAP) | 16,311 | 67.7% | Hamzah Lamin (IND) | 216 | 0.9% | 9,176 | Ronnie Liu Tian Khiew (PR–DAP) | 27,594 | 23% | 59% | 16% | | 24,089 | 87.3% | 365 | 1.3% |
| N47 | Pandamaran | Eric Tan Pok Shyong (PR–DAP) | 16,311 | 67.7% | Deligannu Allagan (IND) | 62 | 0.3% | 9,176 | Ronnie Liu Tian Khiew (PR–DAP) | 27,594 | 23% | 59% | 16% | | 24,089 | 87.3% | 365 | 1.3% |
| N48 | Kota Alam Shah | Ganabatirau Veraman (PR–DAP) | 18,971 | 75.2% | Maglin Dennis D'Cruz (BN–PPP) | 5,602 | 22.2% | 13,369 | Manoharan Malayalam (PR–DAP) | 29,507 | 15% | 57% | 25% | | 25,227 | 85.5% | 386 | 1.3% |
| N48 | Kota Alam Shah | Ganabatirau Veraman (PR–DAP) | 18,971 | 75.2% | Loo Hok Chai (IND) | 186 | 0.7% | 13,369 | Manoharan Malayalam (PR–DAP) | 29,507 | 15% | 57% | 25% | | 25,227 | 85.5% | 386 | 1.3% |
| N48 | Kota Alam Shah | Ganabatirau Veraman (PR–DAP) | 18,971 | 75.2% | Pannerselvam G. Letchumanan (IND) | 82 | 0.3% | 13,369 | Manoharan Malayalam (PR–DAP) | 29,507 | 15% | 57% | 25% | | 25,227 | 85.5% | 386 | 1.3% |
| N49 | Seri Andalas | Xavier Jayakumar Arulanandam (PR–PKR) | 31,491 | 63.7% | Mohan Thangarasu (BN–MIC) | 15,858 | 32.1% | 15,633 | Xavier Jayakumar Arulanandam (PR–PKR) | 56,763 | 39% | 24% | 35% | | 49,457 | 87.1% | 582 | 1.0% |
| N49 | Seri Andalas | Xavier Jayakumar Arulanandam (PR–PKR) | 31,491 | 63.7% | Hanafiah Husin (IND) | 871 | 1.8% | 15,633 | Xavier Jayakumar Arulanandam (PR–PKR) | 56,763 | 39% | 24% | 35% | | 49,457 | 87.1% | 582 | 1.0% |
| N49 | Seri Andalas | Xavier Jayakumar Arulanandam (PR–PKR) | 31,491 | 63.7% | Uthayakumar Ponnusamy (IND) | 614 | 1.2% | 15,633 | Xavier Jayakumar Arulanandam (PR–PKR) | 56,763 | 39% | 24% | 35% | | 49,457 | 87.1% | 582 | 1.0% |
| N49 | Seri Andalas | Xavier Jayakumar Arulanandam (PR–PKR) | 31,491 | 63.7% | Kottappan Suppaiah (IND) | 41 | 0.15 | 15,633 | Xavier Jayakumar Arulanandam (PR–PKR) | 56,763 | 39% | 24% | 35% | | 49,457 | 87.1% | 582 | 1.0% |
| N50 | Sri Muda | Mat Shuhaimi Shafiei (PR–PKR) | 27,488 | 63.8% | Mohd Abdul Raof Mokhtar (BN–UMNO) | 14,978 | 34.7% | 12,510 | Mat Shuhaimi Shafiei (PR–PKR) | 49,146 | 50% | 26% | 22% | | 43,114 | 87.7% | 406 | 0.8% |
| N50 | Sri Muda | Mat Shuhaimi Shafiei (PR–PKR) | 27,488 | 63.8% | Ramaswree Duraisamy (IND) | 242 | 0.6% | 12,510 | Mat Shuhaimi Shafiei (PR–PKR) | 49,146 | 50% | 26% | 22% | | 43,114 | 87.7% | 406 | 0.8% |
| N51 | Sijangkang | Ahmad Yunus Hairi (PR–PAS) | 14,838 | 54.6% | Zurihan Yusop (BN–UMNO) | 11,896 | 43.8% | 2,942 | Ahmad Yunus Hairi (PR–PAS) | 30,581 | 63% | 15% | 17% | | 27,151 | 88.8% | 417 | 1.4% |
| N52 | Teluk Datuk | Loh Chee Heng (PR–DAP) | 13,155 | 60.7% | Tan Cheng Chai (BN–MCA) | 7,764 | 35.8% | 5,391 | Philip Tan Choon Swee (PR–DAP) | 24,340 | 29% | 45% | 20% | | 21,667 | 89.0% | 384 | 1.6% |
| N52 | Teluk Datuk | Loh Chee Heng (PR–DAP) | 13,155 | 60.7% | Hamzah Abu Bakar (IND) | 364 | 1.7% | 5,391 | Philip Tan Choon Swee (PR–DAP) | 24,340 | 29% | 45% | 20% | | 21,667 | 89.0% | 384 | 1.6% |
| N53 | Morib | Hasnul Baharuddin (PR–PAS) | 15,016 | 50.5% | Hasiman Sidom (BN–UMNO) | 14,250 | 47.9% | 766 | Hasiman Sidom (BN–UMNO) | 33,553 | 59% | 22% | 16% | | 29,746 | 88.6% | 480 | 1.4% |
| N54 | Tanjong Sepat | Mohd Haslin Hassan (PR–PAS) | 10,129 | 50.6% | Nisman Yusof (BN–UMNO) | 9,447 | 47.2% | 682 | Karim Mansor (BN–UMNO) | 22,213 | 52% | 28% | 13% | | 20,000 | 90.0% | 307 | 1.4% |
| N54 | Tanjong Sepat | Mohd Haslin Hassan (PR–PAS) | 10,129 | 50.6% | Muventen Munusamy (IND) | 117 | 0.6% | 682 | Karim Mansor (BN–UMNO) | 22,213 | 52% | 28% | 13% | | 20,000 | 90.0% | 307 | 1.4% |
| N55 | Dengkil | Shahrum Mohd Sharif (BN–UMNO) | 17,801 | 52.4% | Borhan Aman Shah (PR–PKR) | 15,484 | 45.6% | 2,317 | Marsum Paing (BN–UMNO) | 38,400 | 68% | 12% | 15% | | 33,947 | 88.4% | 459 | 1.2% |
| N55 | Dengkil | Shahrum Mohd Sharif (BN–UMNO) | 17,801 | 52.4% | Azmi Othman (KITA) | 203 | 0.6% | 2,317 | Marsum Paing (BN–UMNO) | 38,400 | 68% | 12% | 15% | | 33,947 | 88.4% | 459 | 1.2% |
| N56 | Sungai Pelek | Lai Nyuk Lan (PR–DAP) | 10,997 | 52.3% | Ng Chok Sin (BN–MCA) | 9,025 | 43.0% | 1,972 | Yap Ee Wah (BN–MCA) | 23,749 | 45% | 33% | 21% | | 21,011 | 88.5% | 399 | 1.7% |
| N56 | Sungai Pelek | Lai Nyuk Lan (PR–DAP) | 10,997 | 52.3% | Zakaria Mohd Mukhtar (KITA) | 430 | 2.0% | 1,972 | Yap Ee Wah (BN–MCA) | 23,749 | 45% | 33% | 21% | | 21,011 | 88.5% | 399 | 1.7% |
| N56 | Sungai Pelek | Lai Nyuk Lan (PR–DAP) | 10,997 | 52.3% | Ab Manap Sahardin (IND) | 160 | 0.8% | 1,972 | Yap Ee Wah (BN–MCA) | 23,749 | 45% | 33% | 21% | | 21,011 | 88.5% | 399 | 1.7% |

== Negeri Sembilan ==
For more details on Pelan dan Helaian Mata (Scoresheet) Bahagian Pilihan Raya Negeri Negeri Sembilan, see footnote

| # | Constituency | Winner | Votes | Votes % | Opponent(s) | Votes | Votes % | Majority | Incumbent | Eligible voters | Malay voters | Chinese voters | Indian voters | Others voters | Voter turnout | Voter turnout % | Spoilt votes | Spoilt votes % |
|---|---|---|---|---|---|---|---|---|---|---|---|---|---|---|---|---|---|---|
| N01 | Chennah | Anthony Loke Siew Fook (PR–DAP) | 5,128 | 54.9% | Siow Foo Wen (BN–MCA) | 4,030 | 43.1% | 1,098 | Siow Chen Pin (BN–MCA) | 11,160 | 43% | 51% | | 4% | 9,347 | 83.8% | 189 | 1.7% |
| N02 | Pertang | Jalaluddin Alias (BN–UMNO) | 5,090 | 62.5% | Muhammad Syamwill Mertadza (PR–PKR) | 2,927 | 36.0% | 2,163 | Razak Mansor (BN–UMNO) | 9,760 | 65% | 22% | | 7% | 8,140 | 83.4% | 123 | 1.3% |
| N03 | Sungai Lui | Mohd Razi Mohd Ali (BN–UMNO) | 9,029 | 73.1% | Nor Anif Selamat (PR–PAS) | 3,039 | 24.6% | 5,990 | Zainal Abidin Ahmad (BN–UMNO) | 14,523 | 77% | 7% | 10% | | 12,352 | 85.1% | 284 | 2.0% |
| N04 | Kelawang | Yunus Rahmat (BN–UMNO) | 4,104 | 51.0% | Rosli Yaakop (PR–PAS) | 3,822 | 47.5% | 282 | Yunus Rahmat (BN–UMNO) | 9,494 | 64% | 31% | 4% | | 8,048 | 84.8% | 122 | 1.3% |
| N05 | Serting | Shamshulkahar Mohd. Deli (BN–UMNO) | 10,807 | 65.8% | Abd Rahman Ramli (PR–PAS) | 5,365 | 32.7% | 5,442 | Shamshulkahar Mohd. Deli (BN–UMNO) | 19,389 | 74% | 16% | 9% | | 16,424 | 84.7% | 252 | 1.3% |
| N06 | Palong | Lilah Yasin (BN–UMNO) | 11,090 | 79.6% | Rebin Birham (PR–PKR) | 2,634 | 18.9% | 8,456 | Aziz Shamsudin (BN–UMNO) | 16,044 | 90% | 2% | 7% | | 13,933 | 86.8% | 209 | 1.3% |
| N07 | Jeram Padang | Manickam Letchuman (BN–MIC) | 5,690 | 61.9% | Kumar Thuraisingham (PR–PKR) | 2,999 | 32.7% | 2,691 | V.S.Mogan (BN–MIC) | 11,336 | 48% | 11% | 36% | | 9,185 | 81.0% | 250 | 2.2% |
| N07 | Jeram Padang | Manickam Letchuman (BN–MIC) | 5,690 | 61.9% | Zailani Zakaria (IND) | 201 | 2.2% | 2,691 | V.S.Mogan (BN–MIC) | 11,336 | 48% | 11% | 36% | | 9,185 | 81.0% | 250 | 2.2% |
| N07 | Jeram Padang | Manickam Letchuman (BN–MIC) | 5,690 | 61.9% | Mazavan A Raman Nair (IND) | 45 | 0.5% | 2,691 | V.S.Mogan (BN–MIC) | 11,336 | 48% | 11% | 36% | | 9,185 | 81.0% | 250 | 2.2% |
| N08 | Bahau | Chew Seh Yong (PR–DAP) | 9,998 | 66.0% | Yee Mee Faa (BN–MCA) | 4,862 | 32.1% | 5,136 | Teo Kok Seong (PR–DAP) | 18,444 | 27% | 64% | 8% | | 15,148 | 82.1% | 288 | 1.6% |
| N09 | Lenggeng | Ishak Ismail (BN–UMNO) | 7,170 | 54.0% | Zulkefly Mohamad Omar (PR–PAS) | 5,112 | 38.5% | 2,058 | Mustafa Salim (BN–UMNO) | 15,340 | 75% | 16% | 7% | | 13,280 | 86.6% | 186 | 1.2% |
| N09 | Lenggeng | Ishak Ismail (BN–UMNO) | 7,170 | 54.0% | Zulkifli Abdullah (IND) | 812 | 6.1% | 2,058 | Mustafa Salim (BN–UMNO) | 15,340 | 75% | 16% | 7% | | 13,280 | 86.6% | 186 | 1.2% |
| N10 | Nilai | Arul Kumar Jambunathan (PR–DAP) | 10,378 | 59.1% | Gan Chee Biow (BN–MCA) | 6,331 | 36.0% | 4,047 | Yap Yew Weng (PR–DAP) | 20,629 | 31% | 46% | 22% | | 17,573 | 85.2% | 327 | 1.6% |
| N10 | Nilai | Arul Kumar Jambunathan (PR–DAP) | 10,378 | 59.1% | Ahmad Kamarulzaman Abu (IND) | 490 | 2.8% | 4,047 | Yap Yew Weng (PR–DAP) | 20,629 | 31% | 46% | 22% | | 17,573 | 85.2% | 327 | 1.6% |
| N10 | Nilai | Arul Kumar Jambunathan (PR–DAP) | 10,378 | 59.1% | Rajashegher Sithambam (IND) | 47 | 0.3% | 4,047 | Yap Yew Weng (PR–DAP) | 20,629 | 31% | 46% | 22% | | 17,573 | 85.2% | 327 | 1.6% |
| N11 | Lobak | Siow Kim Leong (PR–DAP) | 11,880 | 75.7% | Titan Ho Kok Yew (BN–MCA) | 3,610 | 23.0% | 8,270 | Anthony Loke Siew Fook (PR–DAP) | 18,634 | 4% | 74% | 21% | | 15,697 | 84.2% | 207 | 1.1% |
| N12 | Temiang | Ng Chin Tsai (PR–DAP) | 5,478 | 57.8% | Jason Lee Kee Chong (BN–MCA) | 3,801 | 40.1% | 1,677 | Ng Chin Tsai (PR–DAP) | 11,127 | 31% | 57% | 11% | | 9,475 | 85.2% | 196 | 1.8% |
| N13 | Sikamat | Aminuddin Harun (PR–PKR) | 8,584 | 50.9% | Wan Salawati Abdullah (BN–UMNO) | 8,074 | 47.9% | 510 | Aminuddin Harun (PR–PKR) | 19,640 | 63% | 27% | 9% | | 16,869 | 85.9% | 211 | 1.1% |
| N14 | Ampangan | Abu Ubaidah Redza (BN–UMNO) | 7,190 | 49.7% | Kamarul Baharin Abbas (PR–PKR) | 7,101 | 49.0% | 89 | Rashid Latiff (PR–PKR) | 16,935 | 61% | 29% | 8% | | 14,478 | 85.5% | 187 | 1.1% |
| N15 | Juasseh | Mohammad Razi Kail (BN–UMNO) | 4,789 | 59.6% | Rosli Omar (PR–PKR) | 3,101 | 38.6% | 1,688 | Mohammad Razi Kail (BN–UMNO) | 9,528 | 80% | 13% | 6% | | 8,035 | 84.3% | 145 | 1.5% |
| N16 | Seri Menanti | Abdul Samad Ibrahim (BN–UMNO) | 4,538 | 65.4% | Tengku Zamrah Tengku Sulaiman (PR–PKR) | 2,142 | 30.9% | 2,396 | Abdul Samad Ibrahim (BN–UMNO) | 8,250 | 93% | 3% | | 4% | 6,937 | 84.1% | 154 | 1.9% |
| N16 | Seri Menanti | Abdul Samad Ibrahim (BN–UMNO) | 4,538 | 65.4% | Md Ali Mustafa (IND) | 103 | 1.5% | 2,396 | Abdul Samad Ibrahim (BN–UMNO) | 8,250 | 93% | 3% | | 4% | 6,937 | 84.1% | 154 | 1.9% |
| N17 | Senaling | Ismail Lasim (BN–UMNO) | 4,450 | 64.7% | Zaharudin Othman (PR–PAS) | 2,299 | 33.4% | 2,151 | Ismail Lasim (BN–UMNO) | 8,028 | 78% | 19% | 3% | | 6,878 | 85.7% | 129 | 1.6% |
| N18 | Pilah | Norhayati Omar (BN–UMNO) | 5,039 | 49.7% | Mohamad Nazaruddin Sabtu (PR–PKR) | 4,926 | 48.6% | 113 | Adnan Abu Hasan (BN–UMNO) | 12,184 | 65% | 26% | 9% | | 10,134 | 83.2% | 169 | 1.4% |
| N19 | Johol | Abu Samah Mahat (BN–UMNO) | 4,662 | 57.1% | Nor Azman Mohamad (PR–PAS) | 3,318 | 40.6% | 1,344 | Roslan Mohd Yusof (BN–UMNO) | 9,681 | 71% | 19% | 5% | | 8,170 | 84.4% | 190 | 2.0% |
| N20 | Labu | Hasim Rusdi (BN–UMNO) | 7,082 | 54.8% | Mohd Khairil Anuar Wafa (PR–PAS) | 5,571 | 43.1% | 1,511 | Hasim Rusdi (BN–UMNO) | 15,158 | 66% | 12% | 16% | | 12,916 | 85.2% | 263 | 1.7% |
| N21 | Bukit Kepayang | Cha Kee Chin (PR–DAP) | 13,981 | 74.4% | Wong Oi Foon (BN–GERAKAN) | 4,524 | 24.1% | 9,457 | Cha Kee Chin (PR–DAP) | 21,799 | 17% | 60% | 22% | | 18,795 | 86.2% | 160 | 0.7% |
| N21 | Bukit Kepayang | Cha Kee Chin (PR–DAP) | 13,981 | 74.4% | Vijaiyan Sivanathan (IND) | 130 | 0.7% | 9,457 | Cha Kee Chin (PR–DAP) | 21,799 | 17% | 60% | 22% | | 18,795 | 86.2% | 160 | 0.7% |
| N22 | Rahang | Mary Josephine Pritam Singh (PR–DAP) | 7,166 | 57.0% | Julia Wong Pik Min (BN–MCA) | 5,202 | 41.4% | 1,964 | M.K. Arumugam (PR–DAP) | 15,144 | 31% | 46% | 21% | | 12,563 | 83.0% | 195 | 1.3% |
| N23 | Mambau | Yap Yew Weng (PR–DAP) | 13,518 | 75.7% | Yu Chok Tow (BN–MCA) | 4,141 | 23.2% | 9,377 | Wong May May (PR–DAP) | 20,541 | 13% | 62% | 24% | | 17,863 | 86.9% | 204 | 0.9% |
| N24 | Senawang | Gunasekaren Palasamy (PR–DAP) | 9,010 | 66.7% | David Choong Vee Hing (BN–GERAKAN) | 4,205 | 31.1% | 4,805 | Gunasekaran Palasamy (PR–DAP) | 15,761 | 22% | 52% | 25% | | 13,515 | 85.7% | 180 | 1.1% |
| N24 | Senawang | Gunasekaren Palasamy (PR–DAP) | 9,010 | 66.7% | Karthigesan Shanmugam (IND) | 120 | 0.9% | 4,805 | Gunasekaran Palasamy (PR–DAP) | 15,761 | 22% | 52% | 25% | | 13,515 | 85.7% | 180 | 1.1% |
| N25 | Paroi | Mohd Ghazali Wahid (BN–UMNO) | 14,896 | 53.5% | Mohamad Taufek Abd. Ghani (PR–PAS) | 12,712 | 45.7% | 2,184 | Mohamad Taufek Abd. Ghani (PR–PAS) | 31,862 | 70% | 12% | 17% | | 27,838 | 87.4% | 230 | 0.7% |
| N26 | Chembong | Zaifulbahri Idris (BN–UMNO) | 10,153 | 72.2% | Kamarol Ridzuan Mohd Zain (PR–PAS) | 3,673 | 26.1% | 6,480 | Zaifulbahri Idris (BN–UMNO) | 16,287 | 80% | 8% | 11% | | 14,062 | 86.3% | 236 | 1.4% |
| N27 | Rantau | Mohamad Hasan (BN–UMNO) | 10,126 | 63.7% | Aisah Lamsah (PR–PKR) | 5,513 | 34.7% | 4,613 | Mohamad Hasan (BN–UMNO) | 18,232 | 52% | 20% | 28% | | 15,895 | 87.1% | 256 | 1.3% |
| N28 | Kota | Awaludin Said (BN–UMNO) | 8,131 | 71.0% | Ghazali Mohd Shom (PR–PAS) | 3,129 | 27.3% | 5,002 | Awaludin Said (BN–UMNO) | 13,280 | 87% | 7% | 5% | | 11,452 | 86.2% | 192 | 1.4% |
| N29 | Chuah | Chai Tong Chai (PR–PKR) | 5,957 | 62.5% | Lin Chin Fui (BN–MCA) | 3,423 | 35.9% | 2,534 | Chai Tong Chai (PR–PKR) | 11,127 | 20% | 57% | 22% | | 9,530 | 85.6% | 150 | 1.3% |
| N30 | Lukut | Ean Yong Tin Sin (PR–DAP) | 7,692 | 66.2% | Vincent Yeong Seng Wong (BN–MCA) | 3,738 | 32.2% | 3,954 | Ean Yong Tin Sin (PR–DAP) | 13,463 | 18% | 58% | 24% | | 11,620 | 86.3% | 190 | 1.4% |
| N31 | Bagan Pinang | Tun Hairuddin Abu Bakar (BN–UMNO) | 10,206 | 69.3% | Ramli Ismail (PR–PAS) | 4,139 | 28.1% | 6,067 | Mohd Isa Abdul Samad (BN–UMNO) | 17,377 | 69% | 9% | 17% | | 14,720 | 84.7% | 375 | 2.2% |
| N32 | Linggi | Abd Rahman Mohd Redza (BN–UMNO) | 7,859 | 61.8% | Rosman Jonet (PR–PKR) | 4,599 | 36.2% | 3,260 | Ismail Taib (BN–UMNO) | 14,926 | 57% | 20% | 19% | | 12,721 | 85.2% | 263 | 1.8% |
| N33 | Port Dickson | Ravi Munusamy (PR–PKR) | 6,709 | 59.5% | Tanaletchumi Palanisamy (BN–MIC) | 4,287 | 38.0% | 2,422 | Ravi Munusamy (PR–PKR) | 13,631 | 33% | 38% | 28% | | 11,268 | 82.7% | 202 | 1.5% |
| N33 | Port Dickson | Ravi Munusamy (PR–PKR) | 6,709 | 59.5% | Daniel Simon (IND) | 70 | 0.6% | 2,422 | Ravi Munusamy (PR–PKR) | 13,631 | 33% | 38% | 28% | | 11,268 | 82.7% | 202 | 1.5% |
| N34 | Gemas | Abdul Razak Said (BN–UMNO) | 15,040 | 77.0% | Karip Mohd Salleh (PR–PKR) | 4,129 | 21.2% | 10,911 | Zainab Nasir (BN–UMNO) | 22,771 | 82% | 8% | 5% | | 19,520 | 85.7% | 351 | 1.5% |
| N35 | Gemencheh | Mohd Isam Mohd Isa (BN–UMNO) | 7,782 | 60.7% | Mohd Nor Yassin (PR–PAS) | 4,757 | 37.1% | 3,025 | Mohd Kamil Abd Aziz (BN–UMNO) | 15,390 | 61% | 24% | 15% | | 12,825 | 83.3% | 286 | 1.9% |
| N36 | Repah | Veerapan Superamaniam (PR–DAP) | 8,293 | 50.8% | Yap Seong Fook (BN–MCA) | 6,349 | 38.9% | 1,944 | Veerapan Superamaniam (PR–DAP) | 19,107 | 37% | 43% | 19% | | 16,323 | 85.4% | 291 | 1.5% |
| N36 | Repah | Veerapan Superamaniam (PR–DAP) | 8,293 | 50.8% | Fadzil A. Bakar (IND) | 1,390 | 8.5% | 1,944 | Veerapan Superamaniam (PR–DAP) | 19,107 | 37% | 43% | 19% | | 16,323 | 85.4% | 291 | 1.5% |

== Malacca ==
| # | Constituency | Winner | Votes | Votes % | Opponent(s) | Votes | Votes % | Majority | Incumbent | Eligible voters | Malay voters | Chinese voters | Indian voters | Others voters | Voter turnout | Voter turnout % | Spoilt votes | Spoilt votes % |
|---|---|---|---|---|---|---|---|---|---|---|---|---|---|---|---|---|---|---|
| N01 | Kuala Linggi | Ismail Othman (BN–UMNO) | 5,521 | 63.2% | Julasapiyah Kassim (PR–PAS) | 3,090 | 35.3% | 2,431 | Ismail Othman (BN–UMNO) | 10,033 | 72% | 25% | 2% | | 8,742 | 87.1% | 131 | 1.3% |
| N02 | Tanjung Bidara | Md Rawi Mahmud (BN–UMNO) | 6,014 | 76.2% | Imran Abdul Rahman (PR–PAS) | 1,774 | 22.5% | 4,240 | Ab Karim Sulaiman (BN–UMNO) | 9,008 | 94% | 5% | 2% | | 7,889 | 87.6% | 101 | 1.1% |
| N03 | Ayer Limau | Amiruddin Yusop (BN–UMNO) | 6,552 | 75.3% | Halim Bachik (PR–PKR) | 1,983 | 22.8% | 4,569 | Amiruddin Yusof (BN–UMNO) | 10,058 | 90% | 5% | 5% | | 8,702 | 86.5% | 167 | 1.7% |
| N04 | Lendu | Sulaiman Md Ali (BN–UMNO) | 5,009 | 65.8% | Asri Shaik Abdul Aziz (PR–PAS) | 2,506 | 32.9% | 2,503 | Iderris Kassim (BN–UMNO) | 8,848 | 75% | 19% | 5% | | 7,613 | 86.0% | 98 | 1.1% |
| N05 | Taboh Naning | Latipah Omar (BN–UMNO) | 4,520 | 66.5% | Ab Halim Ab Jalil (PR–PAS) | 2,165 | 31.8% | 2,355 | Latipah Omar (BN–UMNO) | 8,005 | 79% | 14% | 6% | | 6,801 | 85.0% | 116 | 1.4% |
| N06 | Rembia | Norpipah Abdol (BN–UMNO) | 6,879 | 59.2% | Rusnah Aluai (PR–PKR) | 4,521 | 38.9% | 2,358 | Norpipah Abdul (BN–UMNO) | 13,412 | 64% | 22% | 14% | | 11,617 | 86.9% | 217 | 1.6% |
| N07 | Gadek | M.S Mahadevan Sanacy (BN–MIC) | 5,975 | 58.3% | Rajandran Govindasamy (PR–PKR) | 3,345 | 32.6% | 2,630 | Abdul Ghafar Atan (BN–UMNO) | 12,246 | 57% | 27% | 15% | | 10,256 | 83.7% | 244 | 2.0% |
| N07 | Gadek | M.S Mahadevan Sanacy (BN–MIC) | 5,975 | 58.3% | Abdullah Sani Rejab (IND) | 692 | 6.7% | 2,630 | Abdul Ghafar Atan (BN–UMNO) | 12,246 | 57% | 27% | 15% | | 10,256 | 83.7% | 244 | 2.0% |
| N08 | Machap | Lai Meng Chong (BN–MCA) | 5,003 | 49.4% | Ginie Lim Siew Lin (PR–PKR) | 4,851 | 47.9% | 152 | Lai Meng Chong (BN–MCA) | 11,682 | 41% | 43% | 14% | | 10,123 | 86.7% | 208 | 1.8% |
| N08 | Machap | Lai Meng Chong (BN–MCA) | 5,003 | 49.4% | Ravinther Sekaran (KITA) | 61 | 0.6% | 152 | Lai Meng Chong (BN–MCA) | 11,682 | 41% | 43% | 14% | | 10,123 | 86.7% | 208 | 1.8% |
| N09 | Durian Tunggal | Ab Wahab Ab Latip (BN–UMNO) | 5,645 | 55.7% | Adly Zahari (PR–PAS) | 4,329 | 42.7% | 1,316 | Ab Wahab Ab Latip (BN–UMNO) | 11,306 | 68% | 23% | 9% | | 10,133 | 89.6% | 159 | 1.4% |
| N10 | Asahan | Abdul Ghafar Atan (BN–UMNO) | 8,257 | 64.0% | Wong Chee Chew (PR–PAS) | 4,400 | 34.1% | 3,857 | R. Perumal (BN–MIC) | 14,945 | 61% | 26% | 12% | | 12,904 | 86.3% | 247 | 1.6% |
| N11 | Sungai Udang | Idris Haron (BN–UMNO) | 12,145 | 79.1% | Asri Buang (PR–PKR) | 3,009 | 19.6% | 9,136 | Yaakub Md Amin (BN–UMNO) | 17,693 | 81% | 6% | | 12% | 15,345 | 86.7% | 191 | 1.1% |
| N12 | Pantai Kundor | Ab Rahaman Ab Karim (BN–UMNO) | 7,101 | 62.7% | Mohd Noor Omar (PR–PAS) | 4,037 | 35.7% | 3,064 | Ab Rahman Ab Karim (BN–UMNO) | 13,079 | 83% | 15% | | 1% | 11,318 | 86.5% | 180 | 1.4% |
| N13 | Paya Rumput | Sazali Muhd Din (BN–UMNO) | 11,003 | 52.4% | Taha Ahmad (PR–PKR) | 9,733 | 46.4% | 1,270 | Tahir Hassan (BN–UMNO) | 23,432 | 56% | 36% | 8% | | 20,993 | 89.6% | 257 | 1.1% |
| N14 | Kelebang | Lim Ban Hong (BN–MCA) | 9,171 | 55.2% | Liou Chen Kuang (PR–DAP) | 7,074 | 42.5% | 2,097 | Seet Har Cheow (BN–MCA) | 19,078 | 60% | 37% | 2% | | 16,629 | 87.2% | 384 | 2.0% |
| N15 | Bachang | Lim Jak Wong (PR–DAP) | 13,688 | 54.6% | Chua Lian Chye (BN–GERAKAN) | 11,016 | 43.9% | 2,672 | Lim Jak Wong (PR–DAP) | 28,367 | 48% | 46% | 5% | | 25,069 | 88.3% | 365 | 1.2% |
| N16 | Ayer Keroh | Khoo Poay Tiong (PR–DAP) | 18,934 | 62.4% | Yong Fun Juan (BN–MCA) | 10,991 | 36.2% | 7,943 | Khoo Poay Tiong (PR–DAP) | 34,225 | 36% | 56% | 8% | | 30,326 | 88.6% | 401 | 1.2% |
| N17 | Bukit Baru | Md Khalid Kassim (PR–PAS) | 9,292 | 49.6% | Karim Yaacob (BN–UMNO) | 9,244 | 49.4% | 48 | Mohd Ali Rustam (BN–UMNO) | 21,292 | 61% | 33% | 4% | | 18,730 | 88.0% | 194 | 0.9% |
| N18 | Ayer Molek | Md Yunos Husin (BN–UMNO) | 8,756 | 62.8% | Md Khairi Abd Aziz (PR–PAS) | 4,995 | 35.8% | 3,761 | Md Yunos Husin (BN–UMNO) | 15,554 | 86% | 8% | 5% | | 13,953 | 89.7% | 202 | 1.3% |
| N19 | Kesidang | Chin Choong Seong (PR–DAP) | 9,443 | 61.9% | Lim Eng Teck (BN–MCA) | 5,625 | 36.9% | 3,818 | Goh Leong San (PR–DAP) | 17,597 | 35% | 62% | 3% | | 15,244 | 86.5% | 176 | 0.9% |
| N20 | Kota Laksamana | Lai Keun Ban (PR–DAP) | 11,969 | 70.9% | Chiw Tiang Chai (BN–PPP) | 3,462 | 20.5% | 8,507 | Betty Chew Gek Cheng (PR–DAP) | 19,732 | 14% | 83% | 3% | | 16,893 | 85.6% | 220 | 1.1% |
| N20 | Kota Laksamana | Lai Keun Ban (PR–DAP) | 11,969 | 70.9% | Sim Tong Him (IND) | 1,242 | 7.4% | 8,507 | Betty Chew Gek Cheng (PR–DAP) | 19,732 | 14% | 83% | 3% | | 16,893 | 85.6% | 220 | 1.1% |
| N21 | Duyong | Goh Leong San (PR–DAP) | 7,997 | 50.0% | Gan Tian Loo (BN–MCA) | 7,792 | 48.7% | 205 | Gan Tian Loo (BN–MCA) | 18,332 | 50% | 44% | 5% | | 16,001 | 87.3% | 212 | 1.2% |
| N22 | Bandar Hilir | Tey Kok Kiew (PR–DAP) | 11,754 | 74.6% | Ronald Gan Yong Hoe (BN–MCA) | 3,802 | 24.1% | 7,952 | Tey Kok Kiew (PR–DAP) | 18,976 | 12% | 77% | | 6% | 15,756 | 83.0% | 200 | 1.1% |
| N23 | Telok Mas | Latiff Tamby Chik (BN–UMNO) | 8,033 | 51.7% | Harun Mohamed (PR–PAS) | 7,332 | 47.1% | 701 | Latiff Tamby Chik (BN–UMNO) | 17,685 | 72% | 26% | 2% | | 15,552 | 87.9% | 187 | 1.1% |
| N24 | Bemban | Ng Choon Koon (BN–MCA) | 7,731 | 56.1% | Gandhi Rajan Nalliah (PR–DAP) | 5,703 | 41.3% | 2,028 | Chua Kheng Hwa (BN–MCA) | 15,811 | 59% | 25% | 16% | | 13,793 | 87.2% | 359 | 2.3% |
| N25 | Rim | Ghazale Muhamad (BN–UMNO) | 4,821 | 55.6% | Azmi Kamis (PR–PKR) | 3,700 | 42.6% | 1,121 | Yazed Khamis (BN–UMNO) | 10,059 | 59% | 25% | 15% | | 8,678 | 86.3% | 157 | 1.6% |
| N26 | Serkam | Zaidi Attan (BN–UMNO) | 8,715 | 62.2% | Kamarudin Sedik (PR–PAS) | 5,115 | 36.5% | 3,600 | Ghazale Muhamad (BN–UMNO) | 15,543 | 89% | 7% | 4% | | 14,015 | 90.2% | 185 | 1.2% |
| N27 | Merlimau | Roslan Ahmad (BN–UMNO) | 6,736 | 61.1% | Yuhaizad Abdullah (PR–PAS) | 4,147 | 37.6% | 2,589 | Roslan Ahmad (BN–UMNO) | 12,608 | 66% | 20% | 13% | | 11,022 | 87.4% | 139 | 1.1% |
| N28 | Sungai Rambai | Hasan Abd Rahman (BN–UMNO) | 5,709 | 62.1% | Kintan Man (PR–PAS) | 3,346 | 36.4% | 2,363 | Hasan Abd Rahman (BN–UMNO) | 10,434 | 82% | 16% | 3% | | 9,197 | 88.1% | 142 | 1.4% |

== Johor ==
| # | Constituency | Winner | Votes | Votes % | Opponent(s) | Votes | Votes % | Majority | Incumbent | Eligible voters | Malay voters | Chinese voters | Indian voters | Others voters | Voter turnout | Voter turnout % | Spoilt votes | Spoilt votes % |
|---|---|---|---|---|---|---|---|---|---|---|---|---|---|---|---|---|---|---|
| N01 | Buloh Kasap | Norshida Ibrahim (BN–UMNO) | 9,448 | 59.0% | Firdaus Masod (PR–PAS) | 6,078 | 37.9% | 3,370 | Othman Jais (BN–UMNO) | 18,779 | 55% | 32% | 12% | | 16,023 | 85.3% | 497 | 2.6% |
| N02 | Jementah | Tan Chen Choon (PR–DAP) | 12,781 | 53.7% | Lee Hong Tee (BN–MCA) | 10,585 | 44.5% | 2,196 | Lee Hong Tee (BN–MCA) | 28,230 | 36% | 55% | 9% | | 23,794 | 84.3% | 428 | 1.5% |
| N03 | Pemanis | Lau Chin Hoon (BN–GERAKAN) | 10,305 | 52.5% | Normala Sudirman (PR–PAS) | 8,976 | 45.7% | 1,329 | Lau Chin Hoon (BN–GERAKAN) | 22,617 | 56% | 39% | 3% | | 19,646 | 86.9% | 365 | 1.6% |
| N04 | Kemelah | Ayub Rahmat (BN–UMNO) | 9,917 | 55.7% | Natrah Ismail (PR–PKR) | 7,657 | 43.0% | 2,260 | Ayub Rahmat (BN–UMNO) | 20,449 | 55% | 39% | 6% | | 17,803 | 87.1% | 229 | 1.1% |
| N05 | Tenang | Mohd Azahar Ibrahim (BN–UMNO) | 7,921 | 54.3% | Md Zin Johar (PR–PAS) | 6,335 | 43.4% | 1,586 | Sulaiman Taha (BN–UMNO) | 16,940 | 49% | 38% | 11% | | 14,593 | 86.1% | 337 | 2.0% |
| N06 | Bekok | Lim Eng Guan (PR–DAP) | 9,243 | 53.2% | Tan Chong (BN–MCA) | 7,842 | 45.1% | 1,401 | Tan Kok Hong (BN–MCA) | 20,774 | 26% | 54% | 18% | | 17,383 | 83.7% | 298 | 1.4% |
| N07 | Bukit Serampang | Ismail Mohamed (BN–UMNO) | 12,977 | 70.2% | Saadon Abdullah (PR–PKR) | 5,132 | 27.8% | 7,845 | Tahir Mohd Taat (BN–UMNO) | 21,429 | 70% | 26% | 2% | | 18,491 | 86.3% | 382 | 1.8% |
| N08 | Jorak | Shahruddin Md Salleh (BN–UMNO) | 12,663 | 57.4% | Nor Hayati Bachok (PR–PAS) | 8,937 | 40.5% | 3,726 | Shahruddin Md Salleh (BN–UMNO) | 25,364 | 59% | 35% | 5% | | 22,049 | 86.9% | 449 | 1.8% |
| N09 | Gambir | M Asojan Muniyandy (BN–MIC) | 8,705 | 46.6% | Mahfodz Mohamed (PR–PAS) | 8,395 | 44.9% | 310 | Asojan Muniyandy (BN–MIC) | 21,382 | 55% | 40% | 4% | | 18,690 | 87.4% | 492 | 2.3% |
| N09 | Gambir | M Asojan Muniyandy (BN–MIC) | 8,705 | 46.6% | Mohd Zan Abu (IND) | 837 | 4.5% | 310 | Asojan Muniyandy (BN–MIC) | 21,382 | 55% | 40% | 4% | | 18,690 | 87.4% | 492 | 2.3% |
| N09 | Gambir | M Asojan Muniyandy (BN–MIC) | 8,705 | 46.6% | Yunus Mustakim (IND) | 261 | 1.4% | 310 | Asojan Muniyandy (BN–MIC) | 21,382 | 55% | 40% | 4% | | 18,690 | 87.4% | 492 | 2.3% |
| N10 | Tangkak | Ee Chin Li (PR–DAP) | 10,729 | 52.7% | Goh Tee Tee (BN–MCA) | 9,192 | 45.1% | 1,537 | Goh Tee Tee (BN–MCA) | 23,394 | 38% | 51% | 10% | | 20,359 | 87.0% | 438 | 1.9% |
| N11 | Serom | Abd Razak Minhat (BN–UMNO) | 11,618 | 54.6% | Azmi Ahmad (PR–PAS) | 9,354 | 44.0% | 2,264 | Abdul Ghani Othman (BN–UMNO) | 24,540 | 66% | 33% | 1% | | 21,277 | 86.7% | 305 | 1.2% |
| N12 | Bentayan | Chua Wee Beng (PR–DAP) | 13,235 | 66.7% | Fong Soh Lan (BN–MCA) | 6,388 | 32.2% | 6,847 | Gwee Tong Hiang (PR–DAP) | 23,438 | 25% | 73% | 2% | | 19,832 | 84.6% | 209 | 0.9% |
| N13 | Sungai Abong | Sheikh Ibrahim Salleh (PR–PAS) | 14,084 | 57.0% | Haris Salleh (BN–UMNO) | 10,271 | 41.6% | 3,813 | Sheikh Ibrahim Salleh (PR–PAS) | 28,262 | 51% | 45% | 3% | | 24,689 | 87.4% | 334 | 1.2% |
| N14 | Bukit Naning | Saipolbahari Suib (BN–UMNO) | 7,168 | 52.1% | Abdul Aziz Muhammad (PR–PKR) | 5,713 | 41.5% | 1,455 | Abdullah Md Ali (BN–UMNO) | 15,502 | 59% | 38% | | 2% | 13,755 | 88.7% | 319 | 2.1% |
| N14 | Bukit Naning | Saipolbahari Suib (BN–UMNO) | 7,168 | 52.1% | Md Ghazali Salamun (IND) | 555 | 4.0% | 1,455 | Abdullah Md Ali (BN–UMNO) | 15,502 | 59% | 38% | | 2% | 13,755 | 88.7% | 319 | 2.1% |
| N15 | Maharani | Mohammad Taslim (PR–PAS) | 12,731 | 56.1% | Zulkhairi Ahmad (BN–UMNO) | 9,595 | 42.3% | 3,136 | Mohammad Taslim (PR–PAS) | 27,090 | 55% | 42% | 2% | | 22,695 | 83.8% | 369 | 1.4% |
| N16 | Sungai Balang | Zaiton Ismail (BN–UMNO) | 9,716 | 53.4% | Malik Mohamed Diah (PR–PAS) | 8,081 | 44.4% | 1,635 | Robia Kosai (BN–UMNO) | 21,118 | 72% | 27% | | 1% | 18,205 | 86.2% | 408 | 1.9% |
| N17 | Semerah | Mohd Ismail Roslan (BN–UMNO) | 14,404 | 54.1% | Mohd Ysahruddin Kusni (PR–PKR) | 11,755 | 44.2% | 2,649 | Ariss Samsudin (BN–UMNO) | 31,046 | 63% | 34% | | 3% | 26,605 | 85.7% | 446 | 1.4% |
| N18 | Sri Medan | Zulkurnain Kamisan (BN–UMNO) | 16,034 | 69.4% | Ahmad Rosdi Bahari (PR–PAS) | 6,604 | 28.6% | 9,430 | Ahmad Zahri Jamil (BN–UMNO) | 25,850 | 83% | 9% | | 8% | 23,112 | 89.4% | 474 | 1.8% |
| N19 | Yong Peng | Chew Peck Choo (PR–DAP) | 10,825 | 55.4% | Lim Kee Moi (BN–MCA) | 8,350 | 42.7% | 2,475 | Lim Kee Moi (BN–MCA) | 22,484 | 32% | 60% | 7% | | 19,540 | 86.9% | 365 | 1.6% |
| N20 | Semarang | Samsolbari Jamali (BN–UMNO) | 12,981 | 71.3% | Alliar A Bakar (PR–PAS) | 4,906 | 26.9% | 8,075 | Samsolbari Jamali (BN–UMNO) | 20,429 | 82% | 13% | | 4% | 18,207 | 89.1% | 320 | 1.6% |
| N21 | Parit Yaani | Aminolhuda Hassan (PR–PAS) | 11,278 | 51.9% | Teo Yew Chuan (BN–MCA) | 10,090 | 46.4% | 1,188 | Ng See Tiong (BN–MCA) | 24,609 | 54% | 43% | | 2% | 21,747 | 88.4% | 379 | 1.5% |
| N22 | Parit Raja | Azizah Zakaria (BN–UMNO) | 10,839 | 60.0% | Noor Khalim Sakib (PR–PAS) | 6,883 | 38.1% | 3,956 | Aziz Kaprawi (BN–UMNO) | 20,207 | 73% | 22% | | 3% | 18,072 | 89.4% | 350 | 1.7% |
| N23 | Penggaram | Gan Peck Cheng (PR–DAP) | 24,277 | 61.7% | King Ban Siang (BN–MCA) | 14,226 | 36.2% | 10,051 | Koh Chee Chai (BN–MCA) | 45,157 | 35% | 62% | 2% | | 39,339 | 87.1% | 836 | 1.9% |
| N24 | Senggarang | A Aziz Ismail (BN–UMNO) | 11,254 | 53.3% | Mohd Ramli Md Kari (PR–PAS) | 9,399 | 44.5% | 1,855 | Jaafar Hashim (BN–UMNO) | 24,048 | 61% | 37% | | 2% | 21,122 | 87.8% | 469 | 2.0% |
| N25 | Rengit | Ayub Jamil (BN–UMNO) | 10,882 | 65.6% | Ahmad Kailani Kosnin (PR–PAS) | 5,390 | 32.5% | 5,492 | Ayub Jamil (BN–UMNO) | 19,067 | 79% | 18% | | 2% | 16,588 | 87.0% | 316 | 1.7% |
| N26 | Machap | Abd Taib Abu Bakar (BN–UMNO) | 11,515 | 58.8% | Mohd Khalid Salekan (PR–PAS) | 7,613 | 38.9% | 3,902 | Abd Hamid Abd Rahman (BN–UMNO) | 22,221 | 60% | 35% | 5% | | 19,570 | 88.1% | 442 | 2.0% |
| N27 | Layang-Layang | Abd Mutalip Abd Rahim (BN–UMNO) | 8,613 | 57.0% | Mohd Ishak Shir Mohd (PR–PKR) | 6,095 | 40.4% | 2,518 | Onn Mohd Yassin (BN–UMNO) | 17,922 | 49% | 35% | 15% | | 15,098 | 84.2% | 390 | 2.2% |
| N28 | Mengkibol | Tan Hong Pin (PR–DAP) | 23,036 | 62.8% | Chye Kwee Yeow (BN–MCA) | 13,035 | 35.5% | 10,001 | Ng Lam Hua (PR–DAP) | 42,380 | 27% | 58% | 14% | | 36,683 | 86.6% | 527 | 1.2% |
| N28 | Mengkibol | Tan Hong Pin (PR–DAP) | 23,036 | 62.8% | Ng Lam Hua (IND) | 85 | 0.2% | 10,001 | Ng Lam Hua (PR–DAP) | 42,380 | 27% | 58% | 14% | | 36,683 | 86.6% | 527 | 1.2% |
| N29 | Mahkota | Md Jais Sarday (BN–UMNO) | 19,431 | 50.6% | Khairul Faizi Ahmad Kamil (PR–PAS) | 18,323 | 47.7% | 1,108 | Md Jais Sarday (BN–UMNO) | 44,352 | 51% | 41% | 6% | | 38,396 | 86.6% | 642 | 1.4% |
| N30 | Paloh | Teoh Yap Kun (BN–MCA) | 7,531 | 49.0% | Shanker Rengganathan (PR–DAP) | 7,428 | 48.4% | 103 | Hoo Seong Chang (BN–MCA) | 18,222 | 37% | 44% | 17% | | 15,362 | 84.3% | 403 | 2.2% |
| N31 | Kahang | Vidyananthan Ramanadhan (BN–MIC) | 13,955 | 68.1% | Hamdan Basiran (PR–PKR) | 6,154 | 30.0% | 7,801 | Vidyananthan Ramanadhan (BN–MIC) | 23,366 | 74% | 21% | | 3% | 20,495 | 87.7% | 386 | 1.6% |
| N32 | Endau | Abd Latiff Bandi (BN–UMNO) | 9,183 | 59.0% | Mohd Azam Abd Razak (PR–PAS) | 6,073 | 39.0% | 3,110 | Zainal Abidin Osman (BN–UMNO) | 19,040 | 76% | 19% | | 4% | 15,567 | 81.8% | 311 | 1.6% |
| N33 | Tenggaroh | Raven Kumar Krishnasamy (BN–MIC) | 17,054 | 78.6% | Murugan Muthu Samy (PR–PKR) | 4,040 | 18.6% | 13,014 | Murukasvary Thanarajan (BN–MIC) | 25,457 | 80% | 13% | | 5% | 21,711 | 85.3% | 617 | 2.4% |
| N34 | Panti | Baderi Dasuki (BN–UMNO) | 12,274 | 79.9% | Azlisham Azahar (PR–PAS) | 2,004 | 13.1% | 10,270 | Baderi Dasuki (BN–UMNO) | 17,358 | 86% | 7% | 4% | | 15,355 | 88.5% | 319 | 1.8% |
| N34 | Panti | Baderi Dasuki (BN–UMNO) | 12,274 | 79.9% | Mohd Annuar Mohd Salleh (PR–PKR) | 758 | 4.9% | 10,270 | Baderi Dasuki (BN–UMNO) | 17,358 | 86% | 7% | 4% | | 15,355 | 88.5% | 319 | 1.8% |
| N35 | Pasir Raja | Adham Baba (BN–UMNO) | 12,920 | 66.2% | Mohd Nazari Mokhtar (PR–PAS) | 6,254 | 32.1% | 6,666 | Adham Baba (BN–UMNO) | 22,336 | 61% | 26% | 9% | | 19,503 | 87.3% | 329 | 1.5% |
| N36 | Sedili | Rasman Ithnain (BN–UMNO) | 19,907 | 90.1% | Abd Kadir Sainudin (PR–PKR) | 1,780 | 8.1% | 18,127 | Rasman Ithnain (BN–UMNO) | 24,716 | 96% | 2% | | 2% | 22,089 | 89.4% | 402 | 1.6% |
| N37 | Johor Lama | Asiah Md Ariff (BN–UMNO) | 10,769 | 72.9% | Kamaldin Tahir (PR–PAS) | 3,747 | 25.4% | 7,022 | Asiah Md Ariff (BN–UMNO) | 17,178 | 72% | 23% | 4% | | 14,770 | 86.0% | 254 | 1.5% |
| N38 | Penawar | Hamimah Mansor (BN–UMNO) | 15,101 | 85.6% | Anis Afida Mohd Azli (PR–PAS) | 2,283 | 12.9% | 12,818 | Hamimah Mansor (BN–UMNO) | 19,881 | 97% | | 1% | 2% | 17,636 | 88.9% | 252 | 1.5% |
| N39 | Tanjong Surat | Syed Sis Syed Abdul Rahman (BN–UMNO) | 12,014 | 78.4% | Hasnul Ahmad (PR–PKR) | 2,979 | 19.4% | 9,035 | Harun Abdullah (BN–UMNO) | 18,118 | 77% | 21% | | 2% | 15,332 | 84.6% | 339 | 1.9% |
| N40 | Tiram | Maulizan Bujang (BN–UMNO) | 23,716 | 58.1% | Kumutha Rahman (PR–PAS) | 16,273 | 39.9% | 7,443 | Maulizan Bujang (BN–UMNO) | 46,658 | 53% | 30% | 15% | | 40,824 | 87.5% | 835 | 1.8% |
| N41 | Puteri Wangsa | Abdullah Husin (PR–PAS) | 20,357 | 52.3% | Soorianarayanan Muniandy (BN–MIC) | 16,888 | 43.4% | 3,469 | Abdul Halim Suleiman (BN–UMNO) | 43,824 | 40% | 47% | 12% | | 38,927 | 88.8% | 709 | 1.6% |
| N41 | Puteri Wangsa | Abdullah Husin (PR–PAS) | 20,357 | 52.3% | Ravindaran Doraisamy (IND) | 973 | 2.5% | 3,469 | Abdul Halim Suleiman (BN–UMNO) | 43,824 | 40% | 47% | 12% | | 38,927 | 88.8% | 709 | 1.6% |
| N42 | Johor Jaya | Liow Cai Tung (PR–DAP) | 22,879 | 50.2% | Tan Cher Puk (BN–MCA) | 21,419 | 47.0% | 1,460 | Tan Cher Puk (BN–MCA) | 51,648 | 43% | 47% | 7% | | 45,562 | 88.2% | 1,087 | 2.1% |
| N42 | Johor Jaya | Liow Cai Tung (PR–DAP) | 22,879 | 50.2% | Hong Eng Wah (IND) | 177 | 0.4% | 1,460 | Tan Cher Puk (BN–MCA) | 51,648 | 43% | 47% | 7% | | 45,562 | 88.2% | 1,087 | 2.1% |
| N43 | Permas | Mohamed Khaled Nordin (BN–UMNO) | 23,952 | 55.9% | Syed Othman Abdullah (PR–PAS) | 18,200 | 42.4% | 5,752 | Munusamy Mareemuthu (BN–MIC) | 49,393 | 52% | 29% | 15% | | 42,881 | 86.8% | 729 | 1.5% |
| N44 | Tanjong Puteri | Adam Sumiru (BN–UMNO) | 25,687 | 59.9% | Mohd Salleh Ahmad (PR–PKR) | 16,590 | 38.7% | 9,097 | Adam Sumiru (BN–UMNO) | 51,442 | 61% | 32% | 5% | | 42,869 | 83.3% | 592 | 1.2% |
| N45 | Stulang | Andrew Chen Kah Eng (PR–DAP) | 19,799 | 53.6% | Chong Chee Siong (BN–MCA) | 16,503 | 44.7% | 3,296 | Mok Chek Hou (BN–MCA) | 44,879 | 39% | 55% | 4% | | 36,927 | 82.3% | 625 | 1.4% |
| N46 | Pengkalan Rinting | Cheo Yee How (PR–DAP) | 26,464 | 50.9% | Chang Mei Kee (BN–MCA) | 24,494 | 47.1% | 1,970 | Chia Song Cheng (BN–MCA) | 61,217 | 43% | 45% | 11% | | 52,021 | 85.0% | 1,063 | 1.7% |
| N47 | Kempas | Tengku Putra Haron Aminurrashid Tengku Hamid Jumat (BN–UMNO) | 18,595 | 55.1% | Suhaizan Kayat (PR–PAS) | 14,648 | 43.4% | 3,947 | Osman Sapian (BN–UMNO) | 39,273 | 54% | 35% | 9% | | 33,737 | 85.9% | 494 | 1.3% |
| N48 | Skudai | Boo Cheng Hau (PR–DAP) | 33,692 | 67.6% | Liang Ah Chy (BN–MCA) | 15,642 | 31.4% | 18,050 | Boo Cheng Hau (PR–DAP) | 56,543 | 22% | 65% | 12% | | 49,858 | 88.2% | 524 | 0.9% |
| N49 | Nusajaya | Zaini Abu Bakar (BN–UMNO) | 23,166 | 51.5% | Salahuddin Ayub (PR–PAS) | 20,965 | 46.6% | 2,201 | Abdul Aziz Sapian (BN–UMNO) | 50,183 | 47% | 38% | 13% | | 45,003 | 89.7% | 872 | 1.7% |
| N50 | Bukit Permai | Ali Mazat Salleh (BN–UMNO) | 11,236 | 57.8% | Mazlan Aliman (PR–PAS) | 7,867 | 40.5% | 3,369 | Kamaruzaman Ali (BN–UMNO) | 21,619 | 53% | 34% | 12% | | 19,430 | 89.9% | 327 | 1.5% |
| N51 | Bukit Batu | Jimmy Puah Wee Tse (PR–PKR) | 11,676 | 58.4% | Cheong Chin Liang (BN–GERAKAN) | 7,661 | 38.3% | 4,015 | Cheong Chin Liang (BN–GERAKAN) | 22,262 | 30% | 62% | 7% | | 20,007 | 89.9% | 493 | 2.2% |
| N51 | Bukit Batu | Jimmy Puah Wee Tse (PR–PKR) | 11,676 | 58.4% | Surendiran Kuppayah (IND) | 177 | 0.9% | 4,015 | Cheong Chin Liang (BN–GERAKAN) | 22,262 | 30% | 62% | 7% | | 20,007 | 89.9% | 493 | 2.2% |
| N52 | Senai | Wong Shu Qi (PR–DAP) | 23,110 | 65.2% | Tang Nai Soon (BN–MCA) | 11,883 | 33.5% | 11,227 | Ong Kow Meng (PR–DAP) | 40,110 | 23% | 65% | 11% | | 35,451 | 88.4% | 458 | 1.1% |
| N53 | Benut | Hasni Mohammad (BN–UMNO) | 12,358 | 66.5% | Sarobo Ponoh (PR–PAS) | 5,786 | 31.1% | 6,572 | Hasni Mohammad (BN–UMNO) | 21,463 | 78% | 18% | | 4% | 18,590 | 86.6% | 446 | 2.1% |
| N54 | Pulai Sebatang | Tee Siew Kiong (BN–MCA) | 13,554 | 56.1% | Ungku Mohd Noor Ungku Mahmood (PR–PAS) | 10,142 | 42.0% | 3,412 | Tee Siew Kiong (BN–MCA) | 28,170 | 62% | 35% | | 2% | 24,161 | 85.8% | 465 | 1.7% |
| N55 | Pekan Nanas | Yeo Tung Siong (PR–DAP) | 15,436 | 53.8% | Wong You Fong (BN–MCA) | 12,767 | 44.5% | 2,669 | Tang Nai Soon (BN–MCA) | 32,486 | 39% | 58% | | 2% | 28,708 | 88.4% | 505 | 1.6% |
| N56 | Kukup | Suhaimi Salleh (BN–UMNO) | 11,682 | 69.4% | Ghazaley Ayiub (PR–PAS) | 4,736 | 28.1% | 6,946 | Md Othman Yusof (BN–UMNO) | 19,389 | 69% | 28% | | 3% | 16,844 | 86.9% | 426 | 2.2% |

== Sabah ==
| # | Constituency | Winner | Votes | Votes % | Opponent(s) | Votes | Votes % | Majority | Incumbent | Eligible voters | Chinese voters | Others voters | Muslim Bumiputera voters | Non-Muslim Bumiputera voters | Voter turnout | Voter turnout % | Spoilt votes | Spoilt votes % |
|---|---|---|---|---|---|---|---|---|---|---|---|---|---|---|---|---|---|---|
| N01 | Banggi | Abdul Mijul Unaini (BN–UMNO) | 4,293 | 59.2% | Abdul Razak Abdul Salam (PR–PKR) | 1,054 | 14.5% | 3,239 | Abdul Mijul Unaini (BN–UMNO) | 9,861 | | 3% | 61% | 37% | 7,257 | 73.6% | 256 | 2.6% |
| N01 | Banggi | Abdul Mijul Unaini (BN–UMNO) | 4,293 | 59.2% | Mursalim Tanjul (IND) | 642 | 8.8% | 3,239 | Abdul Mijul Unaini (BN–UMNO) | 9,861 | | 3% | 61% | 37% | 7,257 | 73.6% | 256 | 2.6% |
| N01 | Banggi | Abdul Mijul Unaini (BN–UMNO) | 4,293 | 59.2% | Jae-ly Medong (SAPP) | 536 | 7.4% | 3,239 | Abdul Mijul Unaini (BN–UMNO) | 9,861 | | 3% | 61% | 37% | 7,257 | 73.6% | 256 | 2.6% |
| N01 | Banggi | Abdul Mijul Unaini (BN–UMNO) | 4,293 | 59.2% | Mohd Arifin Abdul Salam (STAR) | 476 | 6.6% | 3,239 | Abdul Mijul Unaini (BN–UMNO) | 9,861 | | 3% | 61% | 37% | 7,257 | 73.6% | 256 | 2.6% |
| N02 | Tanjong Kapor | Teo Chee Kang (BN–LDP) | 8,890 | 51.2% | Chin Chung Kui (PR–PKR) | 6,905 | 39.8% | 1,985 | Teo Chee Kang (BN–LDP) | 22,476 | 22% | | 50% | 27% | 17,364 | 77.3% | 398 | 1.8% |
| N02 | Tanjong Kapor | Teo Chee Kang (BN–LDP) | 8,890 | 51.2% | Tsen Heng Chong (SAPP) | 500 | 2.9% | 1,985 | Teo Chee Kang (BN–LDP) | 22,476 | 22% | | 50% | 27% | 17,364 | 77.3% | 398 | 1.8% |
| N02 | Tanjong Kapor | Teo Chee Kang (BN–LDP) | 8,890 | 51.2% | Zainal Nasiruddin (MUPP) | 363 | 2.1% | 1,985 | Teo Chee Kang (BN–LDP) | 22,476 | 22% | | 50% | 27% | 17,364 | 77.3% | 398 | 1.8% |
| N02 | Tanjong Kapor | Teo Chee Kang (BN–LDP) | 8,890 | 51.2% | Hendiri Minar (STAR) | 273 | 1.6% | 1,985 | Teo Chee Kang (BN–LDP) | 22,476 | 22% | | 50% | 27% | 17,364 | 77.3% | 398 | 1.8% |
| N02 | Tanjong Kapor | Teo Chee Kang (BN–LDP) | 8,890 | 51.2% | Alexander Anthony (IND) | 35 | 0.2% | 1,985 | Teo Chee Kang (BN–LDP) | 22,476 | 22% | | 50% | 27% | 17,364 | 77.3% | 398 | 1.8% |
| N03 | Pitas | Bolkiah Ismail (BN–UMNO) | 6,934 | 59.0% | Maklin Masiau (STAR) | 3,111 | 26.5% | 3,823 | Bolkiah Ismail (BN–UMNO) | 14,912 | | 3% | 35% | 61% | 11,745 | 78.8% | 354 | 2.4% |
| N03 | Pitas | Bolkiah Ismail (BN–UMNO) | 6,934 | 59.0% | Dausieh Queck (PR–PAS) | 976 | 8.3% | 3,823 | Bolkiah Ismail (BN–UMNO) | 14,912 | | 3% | 35% | 61% | 11,745 | 78.8% | 354 | 2.4% |
| N03 | Pitas | Bolkiah Ismail (BN–UMNO) | 6,934 | 59.0% | Johnes Piut (SAPP) | 232 | 2.0% | 3,823 | Bolkiah Ismail (BN–UMNO) | 14,912 | | 3% | 35% | 61% | 11,745 | 78.8% | 354 | 2.4% |
| N03 | Pitas | Bolkiah Ismail (BN–UMNO) | 6,934 | 59.0% | Awang Latip Abdul Salam (KITA) | 138 | 1.2% | 3,823 | Bolkiah Ismail (BN–UMNO) | 14,912 | | 3% | 35% | 61% | 11,745 | 78.8% | 354 | 2.4% |
| N04 | Matunggong | Jelani Dasanap (PR–PKR) | 6,947 | 43.7% | Sarapin Magana (BN–PBS) | 6,627 | 41.7% | 320 | Sarapin Magana (BN–PBS) | 19,977 | 1% | | 26% | 72% | 15,901 | 79.6% | 370 | 1.9% |
| N04 | Matunggong | Jelani Dasanap (PR–PKR) | 6,947 | 43.7% | Marunsai Dawai (STAR) | 1,536 | 9.7% | 320 | Sarapin Magana (BN–PBS) | 19,977 | 1% | | 26% | 72% | 15,901 | 79.6% | 370 | 1.9% |
| N04 | Matunggong | Jelani Dasanap (PR–PKR) | 6,947 | 43.7% | Richard Jiun (SAPP) | 367 | 2.3% | 320 | Sarapin Magana (BN–PBS) | 19,977 | 1% | | 26% | 72% | 15,901 | 79.6% | 370 | 1.9% |
| N04 | Matunggong | Jelani Dasanap (PR–PKR) | 6,947 | 43.7% | Jolius Majawai (IND) | 54 | 0.3% | 320 | Sarapin Magana (BN–PBS) | 19,977 | 1% | | 26% | 72% | 15,901 | 79.6% | 370 | 1.9% |
| N05 | Tandek | Anita Baranting (BN–PBS) | 9,399 | 54.7% | Andonny Pilit (PR–PKR) | 4,124 | 24.0% | 5,275 | Lasiah Baranting @ Anita (BN–PBS) | 22,220 | 3% | | 26% | 70% | 17,170 | 77.3% | 599 | 2.7% |
| N05 | Tandek | Anita Baranting (BN–PBS) | 9,399 | 54.7% | Jebon Janaun (STAR) | 2,668 | 15.5% | 5,275 | Lasiah Baranting @ Anita (BN–PBS) | 22,220 | 3% | | 26% | 70% | 17,170 | 77.3% | 599 | 2.7% |
| N05 | Tandek | Anita Baranting (BN–PBS) | 9,399 | 54.7% | Henry Yapolai Kundapit (SAPP) | 380 | 2.2% | 5,275 | Lasiah Baranting @ Anita (BN–PBS) | 22,220 | 3% | | 26% | 70% | 17,170 | 77.3% | 599 | 2.7% |
| N06 | Tempasuk | Musbah Jamli (BN–UMNO) | 8,495 | 59.9% | Laiman Ikin (PR–PAS) | 3,285 | 23.1% | 5,210 | Musbah Jamli (BN–UMNO) | 16,866 | | 1% | 66% | 33% | 14,193 | 84.2% | 325 | 1.9% |
| N06 | Tempasuk | Musbah Jamli (BN–UMNO) | 8,495 | 59.9% | Suwah Buleh (STAR) | 1,769 | 12.5% | 5,210 | Musbah Jamli (BN–UMNO) | 16,866 | | 1% | 66% | 33% | 14,193 | 84.2% | 325 | 1.9% |
| N06 | Tempasuk | Musbah Jamli (BN–UMNO) | 8,495 | 59.9% | Abdul Malik Mohed (SAPP) | 319 | 2.2% | 5,210 | Musbah Jamli (BN–UMNO) | 16,866 | | 1% | 66% | 33% | 14,193 | 84.2% | 325 | 1.9% |
| N07 | Kadamaian | Jeremy Ukoh Malajad (PR–PKR) | 5,877 | 43.2% | Timbon Lagadan (BN–PBS) | 4,988 | 36.7% | 889 | Timbon Lagadan (BN–PBS) | 15,903 | | | 17% | 82% | 13,590 | 85.5% | 301 | 1.9% |
| N07 | Kadamaian | Jeremy Ukoh Malajad (PR–PKR) | 5,877 | 43.2% | Rubbin Guribah (STAR) | 1,877 | 13.8% | 889 | Timbon Lagadan (BN–PBS) | 15,903 | | | 17% | 82% | 13,590 | 85.5% | 301 | 1.9% |
| N07 | Kadamaian | Jeremy Ukoh Malajad (PR–PKR) | 5,877 | 43.2% | Peter Marajin (SAPP) | 547 | 4.0% | 889 | Timbon Lagadan (BN–PBS) | 15,903 | | | 17% | 82% | 13,590 | 85.5% | 301 | 1.9% |
| N08 | Usukan | Mohd. Salleh Mohd. Said (BN–UMNO) | 10,879 | 69.7% | Mustapha Sakmud (PR–PKR) | 4,067 | 26.1% | 6,812 | Japlin Akim @ Abd Hamid (BN–UMNO) | 18,698 | 4% | | 88% | 8% | 15,603 | 83.4% | 372 | 2.0% |
| N08 | Usukan | Mohd. Salleh Mohd. Said (BN–UMNO) | 10,879 | 69.7% | Bakhruddin Ismail (STAR) | 285 | 1.8% | 6,812 | Japlin Akim @ Abd Hamid (BN–UMNO) | 18,698 | 4% | | 88% | 8% | 15,603 | 83.4% | 372 | 2.0% |
| N09 | Tamparuli | Wilfred Bumburing (PR–PKR) | 6,862 | 47.6% | Jahid Jahim (BN–PBS) | 6,479 | 44.9% | 383 | Jahid Jahim (BN–PBS) | 17,265 | 13% | | 23% | 64% | 14,428 | 83.6% | 187 | 1.1% |
| N09 | Tamparuli | Wilfred Bumburing (PR–PKR) | 6,862 | 47.6% | Linggu Bukut (STAR) | 589 | 4.1% | 383 | Jahid Jahim (BN–PBS) | 17,265 | 13% | | 23% | 64% | 14,428 | 83.6% | 187 | 1.1% |
| N09 | Tamparuli | Wilfred Bumburing (PR–PKR) | 6,862 | 47.6% | Stephan Gaimin (SAPP) | 185 | 1.3% | 383 | Jahid Jahim (BN–PBS) | 17,265 | 13% | | 23% | 64% | 14,428 | 83.6% | 187 | 1.1% |
| N09 | Tamparuli | Wilfred Bumburing (PR–PKR) | 6,862 | 47.6% | James Ongkili Jr (IND) | 126 | 0.9% | 383 | Jahid Jahim (BN–PBS) | 17,265 | 13% | | 23% | 64% | 14,428 | 83.6% | 187 | 1.1% |
| N10 | Sulaman | Hajiji Noor (BN–UMNO) | 13,065 | 76.7% | Gulabdin Enjih (PR–PKR) | 2,624 | 15.4% | 10,441 | Hajiji Noor (BN–UMNO) | 19,587 | 2% | | 81% | 16% | 17,044 | 87.0% | 449 | 2.3% |
| N10 | Sulaman | Hajiji Noor (BN–UMNO) | 13,065 | 76.7% | Ali Bakar Kawi (IND) | 615 | 3.6% | 10,441 | Hajiji Noor (BN–UMNO) | 19,587 | 2% | | 81% | 16% | 17,044 | 87.0% | 449 | 2.3% |
| N10 | Sulaman | Hajiji Noor (BN–UMNO) | 13,065 | 76.7% | David Orok (STAR) | 225 | 1.3% | 10,441 | Hajiji Noor (BN–UMNO) | 19,587 | 2% | | 81% | 16% | 17,044 | 87.0% | 449 | 2.3% |
| N10 | Sulaman | Hajiji Noor (BN–UMNO) | 13,065 | 76.7% | Arifin Harith (IND) | 66 | 0.4% | 10,441 | Hajiji Noor (BN–UMNO) | 19,587 | 2% | | 81% | 16% | 17,044 | 87.0% | 449 | 2.3% |
| N11 | Kiulu | Joniston Bangkuai (BN–PBS) | 3,745 | 40.3% | Rhodes Panilau (PR–PKR) | 3,701 | 39.8% | 44 | Lovis Rampas (BN–PBS) | 11,424 | 2% | | 13% | 85% | 9,288 | 81.3% | 171 | 1.5% |
| N11 | Kiulu | Joniston Bangkuai (BN–PBS) | 3,745 | 40.3% | Terence Sinti (STAR) | 1,025 | 11.0% | 44 | Lovis Rampas (BN–PBS) | 11,424 | 2% | | 13% | 85% | 9,288 | 81.3% | 171 | 1.5% |
| N11 | Kiulu | Joniston Bangkuai (BN–PBS) | 3,745 | 40.3% | John Hussein (IND) | 517 | 5.6% | 44 | Lovis Rampas (BN–PBS) | 11,424 | 2% | | 13% | 85% | 9,288 | 81.3% | 171 | 1.5% |
| N11 | Kiulu | Joniston Bangkuai (BN–PBS) | 3,745 | 40.3% | Tindil Gonsobil (SAPP) | 129 | 1.4% | 44 | Lovis Rampas (BN–PBS) | 11,424 | 2% | | 13% | 85% | 9,288 | 81.3% | 171 | 1.5% |
| N12 | Karambunai | Jainab Ahmad (BN–UMNO) | 14,818 | 63.5% | Muali Aching (PR–PKR) | 5,542 | 23.7% | 9,276 | Jainab Ahmad (BN–UMNO) | 28,971 | 9% | | 76% | 11% | 23,341 | 80.6% | 661 | 2.3% |
| N12 | Karambunai | Jainab Ahmad (BN–UMNO) | 14,818 | 63.5% | Aziz Ibrahim (SAPP) | 1,977 | 8.5% | 9,276 | Jainab Ahmad (BN–UMNO) | 28,971 | 9% | | 76% | 11% | 23,341 | 80.6% | 661 | 2.3% |
| N12 | Karambunai | Jainab Ahmad (BN–UMNO) | 14,818 | 63.5% | Rano Susulan (IND) | 172 | 0.7% | 9,276 | Jainab Ahmad (BN–UMNO) | 28,971 | 9% | | 76% | 11% | 23,341 | 80.6% | 661 | 2.3% |
| N12 | Karambunai | Jainab Ahmad (BN–UMNO) | 14,818 | 63.5% | Ag Maidin Ag Apong (IND) | 171 | 0.7% | 9,276 | Jainab Ahmad (BN–UMNO) | 28,971 | 9% | | 76% | 11% | 23,341 | 80.6% | 661 | 2.3% |
| N13 | Inanam | Roland Chia Ming Shen (PR–PKR) | 8,926 | 44.5% | Joseph Paulus Lantip (BN–PBS) | 5,724 | 28.5% | 3,202 | Goh Chin Lok (BN–PBS) | 24,403 | 32% | | 22% | 44% | 20,074 | 82.3% | 421 | 1.7% |
| N13 | Inanam | Roland Chia Ming Shen (PR–PKR) | 8,926 | 44.5% | Eric Majimbun (SAPP) | 5,003 | 24.9% | 3,202 | Goh Chin Lok (BN–PBS) | 24,403 | 32% | | 22% | 44% | 20,074 | 82.3% | 421 | 1.7% |
| N14 | Likas | Wong Hong Jun (PR–DAP) | 7,746 | 66.9% | Chin Shu Ying (BN–LDP) | 2,094 | 18.1% | 5,652 | Liew Teck Chan (SAPP) | 15,294 | 74% | | 13% | 12% | 11,581 | 75.7% | 99 | 0.6% |
| N14 | Likas | Wong Hong Jun (PR–DAP) | 7,746 | 66.9% | Yong Teck Lee (SAPP) | 1,487 | 12.8% | 5,652 | Liew Teck Chan (SAPP) | 15,294 | 74% | | 13% | 12% | 11,581 | 75.7% | 99 | 0.6% |
| N14 | Likas | Wong Hong Jun (PR–DAP) | 7,746 | 66.9% | Ho Cheong Tshun (STAR) | 155 | 1.3% | 5,652 | Liew Teck Chan (SAPP) | 15,294 | 74% | | 13% | 12% | 11,581 | 75.7% | 99 | 0.6% |
| N15 | Api-Api | Christina Liew Chin Jin (PR–PKR) | 5,853 | 48.4% | Yee Moh Chai (BN–PBS) | 5,058 | 41.8% | 795 | Yee Moh Chai (BN–PBS) | 15,103 | 60% | | 25% | 14% | 12,099 | 80.1% | 309 | 2.0% |
| N15 | Api-Api | Christina Liew Chin Jin (PR–PKR) | 5,853 | 48.4% | Wong Yit Ming (SAPP) | 713 | 5.9% | 795 | Yee Moh Chai (BN–PBS) | 15,103 | 60% | | 25% | 14% | 12,099 | 80.1% | 309 | 2.0% |
| N15 | Api-Api | Christina Liew Chin Jin (PR–PKR) | 5,853 | 48.4% | Felix Chong Kat Fah (STAR) | 152 | 1.3% | 795 | Yee Moh Chai (BN–PBS) | 15,103 | 60% | | 25% | 14% | 12,099 | 80.1% | 309 | 2.0% |
| N15 | Api-Api | Christina Liew Chin Jin (PR–PKR) | 5,853 | 48.4% | Marcel Jude Joseph (IND) | 14 | 0.1% | 795 | Yee Moh Chai (BN–PBS) | 15,103 | 60% | | 25% | 14% | 12,099 | 80.1% | 309 | 2.0% |
| N16 | Luyang | Hiew King Cheu (PR–DAP) | 11,213 | 70.9% | Shim Tshin Nyuk (BN–MCA) | 2,537 | 16.0% | 8,676 | Melanie Chia Chui Ket (SAPP) | 20,119 | 76% | | 10% | 13% | 15,813 | 78.6% | 110 | 0.5% |
| N16 | Luyang | Hiew King Cheu (PR–DAP) | 11,213 | 70.9% | Chia Chui Ket (SAPP) | 1,694 | 10.7% | 8,676 | Melanie Chia Chui Ket (SAPP) | 20,119 | 76% | | 10% | 13% | 15,813 | 78.6% | 110 | 0.5% |
| N16 | Luyang | Hiew King Cheu (PR–DAP) | 11,213 | 70.9% | Jafery Jomion (STAR) | 259 | 1.6% | 8,676 | Melanie Chia Chui Ket (SAPP) | 20,119 | 76% | | 10% | 13% | 15,813 | 78.6% | 110 | 0.5% |
| N17 | Tanjong Aru | Yong Oui Fah (BN–PBS) | 9,099 | 53.4% | Hamid Ismail (PR–PAS) | 5,409 | 31.7% | 3,690 | Yong Oui Fah (BN–PBS) | 21,973 | 27% | | 58% | 12% | 17,039 | 77.6% | 448 | 2.1% |
| N17 | Tanjong Aru | Yong Oui Fah (BN–PBS) | 9,099 | 53.4% | Yong We Kong (SAPP) | 1,333 | 7.8% | 3,690 | Yong Oui Fah (BN–PBS) | 21,973 | 27% | | 58% | 12% | 17,039 | 77.6% | 448 | 2.1% |
| N17 | Tanjong Aru | Yong Oui Fah (BN–PBS) | 9,099 | 53.4% | Salleh Tiaseh (STAR) | 750 | 4.4% | 3,690 | Yong Oui Fah (BN–PBS) | 21,973 | 27% | | 58% | 12% | 17,039 | 77.6% | 448 | 2.1% |
| N18 | Petagas | Yahyah Hussin (BN–UMNO) | 8,504 | 66.8% | Mat Yunin Atin (PR–PKR) | 2,851 | 22.4% | 5,653 | Yahyah @ Yahya Hussin Ag Husin (BN–UMNO) | 15,517 | 7% | | 71% | 20% | 12,733 | 82.1% | 267 | 1.7% |
| N18 | Petagas | Yahyah Hussin (BN–UMNO) | 8,504 | 66.8% | Awang Ahmad Sah (STAR) | 1,111 | 8.7% | 5,653 | Yahyah @ Yahya Hussin Ag Husin (BN–UMNO) | 15,517 | 7% | | 71% | 20% | 12,733 | 82.1% | 267 | 1.7% |
| N19 | Kapayan | Edwin Bosi (PR–DAP) | 13,020 | 59.2% | Khoo Keok Hai (BN–MCA) | 5,733 | 26.1% | 7,287 | Khoo Keok Hai (BN–MCA) | 26,767 | 49% | | 18% | 31% | 21,985 | 81.1% | 482 | 0.8% |
| N19 | Kapayan | Edwin Bosi (PR–DAP) | 13,020 | 59.2% | Chong Pit Fah (SAPP) | 2,030 | 9.2% | 7,287 | Khoo Keok Hai (BN–MCA) | 26,767 | 49% | | 18% | 31% | 21,985 | 81.1% | 482 | 0.8% |
| N19 | Kapayan | Edwin Bosi (PR–DAP) | 13,020 | 59.2% | Phillip Among (STAR) | 20 | 0.1% | 7,287 | Khoo Keok Hai (BN–MCA) | 26,767 | 49% | | 18% | 31% | 21,985 | 81.1% | 482 | 0.8% |
| N20 | Moyog | Terrence Siambun (PR–PKR) | 7,462 | 50.3% | Philip Benedict Lasimbang (BN–UPKO) | 5,780 | 39.0% | 1,682 | Donald Peter Mojuntin (BN–UPKO) | 17,556 | 8% | | 13% | 79% | 14,828 | 84.5% | 204 | 1.2% |
| N20 | Moyog | Terrence Siambun (PR–PKR) | 7,462 | 50.3% | Danim Siap (SAPP) | 779 | 5.3% | 1,682 | Donald Peter Mojuntin (BN–UPKO) | 17,556 | 8% | | 13% | 79% | 14,828 | 84.5% | 204 | 1.2% |
| N20 | Moyog | Terrence Siambun (PR–PKR) | 7,462 | 50.3% | Bernard Lawrence Solibun (STAR) | 603 | 4.1% | 1,682 | Donald Peter Mojuntin (BN–UPKO) | 17,556 | 8% | | 13% | 79% | 14,828 | 84.5% | 204 | 1.2% |
| N21 | Kawang | Ghulam Haidar Khan Bahadar (BN–UMNO) | 12,301 | 72.0% | Kefli Safar (PR–PKR) | 3,401 | 19.9% | 8,900 | Ghulam Haidar Khan Bahadar (BN–UMNO) | 19,901 | 7% | | 62% | 29% | 17,093 | 85.9% | 237 | 1.2% |
| N21 | Kawang | Ghulam Haidar Khan Bahadar (BN–UMNO) | 12,301 | 72.0% | Edward Dagul (SAPP) | 906 | 5.3% | 8,900 | Ghulam Haidar Khan Bahadar (BN–UMNO) | 19,901 | 7% | | 62% | 29% | 17,093 | 85.9% | 237 | 1.2% |
| N21 | Kawang | Ghulam Haidar Khan Bahadar (BN–UMNO) | 12,301 | 72.0% | Akop Damsah (STAR) | 248 | 1.5% | 8,900 | Ghulam Haidar Khan Bahadar (BN–UMNO) | 19,901 | 7% | | 62% | 29% | 17,093 | 85.9% | 237 | 1.2% |
| N22 | Pantai Manis | Abdul Rahim Ismail (BN–UMNO) | 9,639 | 59.8% | Fred Gabriel (PR–PKR) | 5,230 | 32.5% | 4,409 | Abdul Rahim Ismail (BN–UMNO) | 18,870 | 11% | | 58% | 30% | 16,114 | 85.4% | 239 | 1.3% |
| N22 | Pantai Manis | Abdul Rahim Ismail (BN–UMNO) | 9,639 | 59.8% | Baharudin Nayan (STAR) | 603 | 3.7% | 4,409 | Abdul Rahim Ismail (BN–UMNO) | 18,870 | 11% | | 58% | 30% | 16,114 | 85.4% | 239 | 1.3% |
| N22 | Pantai Manis | Abdul Rahim Ismail (BN–UMNO) | 9,639 | 59.8% | Noraizal Mohd Noor (SAPP) | 403 | 2.5% | 4,409 | Abdul Rahim Ismail (BN–UMNO) | 18,870 | 11% | | 58% | 30% | 16,114 | 85.4% | 239 | 1.3% |
| N23 | Bongawan | Mohamad Alamin (BN–UMNO) | 7,443 | 57.9% | Ibrahim Menudin (PR–PKR) | 4,051 | 31.5% | 3,392 | Karim Bujang (BN–UMNO) | 14,851 | 5% | | 60% | 35% | 12,866 | 86.6% | 261 | 1.8% |
| N23 | Bongawan | Mohamad Alamin (BN–UMNO) | 7,443 | 57.9% | Ak Aliuddin Mohd Tahir (IND) | 455 | 3.5% | 3,392 | Karim Bujang (BN–UMNO) | 14,851 | 5% | | 60% | 35% | 12,866 | 86.6% | 261 | 1.8% |
| N23 | Bongawan | Mohamad Alamin (BN–UMNO) | 7,443 | 57.9% | Awang Talip Awang Bagul (SAPP) | 335 | 2.6% | 3,392 | Karim Bujang (BN–UMNO) | 14,851 | 5% | | 60% | 35% | 12,866 | 86.6% | 261 | 1.8% |
| N23 | Bongawan | Mohamad Alamin (BN–UMNO) | 7,443 | 57.9% | Assim Matali (STAR) | 321 | 2.5% | 3,392 | Karim Bujang (BN–UMNO) | 14,851 | 5% | | 60% | 35% | 12,866 | 86.6% | 261 | 1.8% |
| N24 | Membakut | Mohd. Arifin Mohd. Arif (BN–UMNO) | 6,547 | 63.8% | Narawi Ahmad (PR–PKR) | 3,037 | 29.6% | 3,510 | Mohd Arifin Mohd Arif (BN–UMNO) | 11,777 | 3% | | 61% | 33% | 10,260 | 87.1% | 237 | 2.0% |
| N24 | Membakut | Mohd. Arifin Mohd. Arif (BN–UMNO) | 6,547 | 63.8% | Banjimin Ondoi (SAPP) | 300 | 2.9% | 3,510 | Mohd Arifin Mohd Arif (BN–UMNO) | 11,777 | 3% | | 61% | 33% | 10,260 | 87.1% | 237 | 2.0% |
| N24 | Membakut | Mohd. Arifin Mohd. Arif (BN–UMNO) | 6,547 | 63.8% | Jaapar Ag Gador (STAR) | 139 | 1.4% | 3,510 | Mohd Arifin Mohd Arif (BN–UMNO) | 11,777 | 3% | | 61% | 33% | 10,260 | 87.1% | 237 | 2.0% |
| N25 | Klias | Lajim Ukin (PR–PKR) | 6,324 | 48.4% | Isnin Aliasnih (BN–UMNO) | 6,145 | 47.0% | 179 | Azizah Mohd Dun (BN–UMNO) | 15,338 | 12% | | 67% | 19% | 13,064 | 85.2% | 342 | 2.2% |
| N25 | Klias | Lajim Ukin (PR–PKR) | 6,324 | 48.4% | Mohd Sanusi Taripin (SAPP) | 182 | 1.4% | 179 | Azizah Mohd Dun (BN–UMNO) | 15,338 | 12% | | 67% | 19% | 13,064 | 85.2% | 342 | 2.2% |
| N25 | Klias | Lajim Ukin (PR–PKR) | 6,324 | 48.4% | Aliapa Osman (STAR) | 71 | 0.5% | 179 | Azizah Mohd Dun (BN–UMNO) | 15,338 | 12% | | 67% | 19% | 13,064 | 85.2% | 342 | 2.2% |
| N26 | Kuala Penyu | Limus Jury (BN–UPKO) | 7,311 | 56.7% | Johan OT Ghani (PR–PKR) | 5,038 | 39.1% | 2,273 | Teo Kwan Chin @ Teo Mau Sing (BN–UPKO) | 14,759 | 3% | | 55% | 42% | 12,889 | 87.3% | 250 | 1.7% |
| N26 | Kuala Penyu | Limus Jury (BN–UPKO) | 7,311 | 56.7% | Ining Sintin (STAR) | 154 | 1.2% | 2,273 | Teo Kwan Chin @ Teo Mau Sing (BN–UPKO) | 14,759 | 3% | | 55% | 42% | 12,889 | 87.3% | 250 | 1.7% |
| N26 | Kuala Penyu | Limus Jury (BN–UPKO) | 7,311 | 56.7% | Md Tajuddin Md Walli (IND) | 92 | 0.7% | 2,273 | Teo Kwan Chin @ Teo Mau Sing (BN–UPKO) | 14,759 | 3% | | 55% | 42% | 12,889 | 87.3% | 250 | 1.7% |
| N26 | Kuala Penyu | Limus Jury (BN–UPKO) | 7,311 | 56.7% | Jusbian Kenneth (IND) | 44 | 0.3% | 2,273 | Teo Kwan Chin @ Teo Mau Sing (BN–UPKO) | 14,759 | 3% | | 55% | 42% | 12,889 | 87.3% | 250 | 1.7% |
| N27 | Lumadan | Kamarlin Ombi (BN–UMNO) | 6,338 | 54.1% | Rapahi Edris (IND) | 2,476 | 21.1% | 3,862 | Kamarlin Ombi (BN–UMNO) | 13,777 | 4% | | 77% | 18% | 11,722 | 85.1% | 246 | 1.8% |
| N27 | Lumadan | Kamarlin Ombi (BN–UMNO) | 6,338 | 54.1% | Abdul Rahman Md Yakub (PR–PKR) | 2,303 | 19.6% | 3,862 | Kamarlin Ombi (BN–UMNO) | 13,777 | 4% | | 77% | 18% | 11,722 | 85.1% | 246 | 1.8% |
| N27 | Lumadan | Kamarlin Ombi (BN–UMNO) | 6,338 | 54.1% | Mohd Jaafar Ibrahim (STAR) | 147 | 1.3% | 3,862 | Kamarlin Ombi (BN–UMNO) | 13,777 | 4% | | 77% | 18% | 11,722 | 85.1% | 246 | 1.8% |
| N27 | Lumadan | Kamarlin Ombi (BN–UMNO) | 6,338 | 54.1% | Jamain Sarudin (SAPP) | 143 | 1.2% | 3,862 | Kamarlin Ombi (BN–UMNO) | 13,777 | 4% | | 77% | 18% | 11,722 | 85.1% | 246 | 1.8% |
| N27 | Lumadan | Kamarlin Ombi (BN–UMNO) | 6,338 | 54.1% | Saudi Suhaili (IND) | 69 | 0.6% | 3,862 | Kamarlin Ombi (BN–UMNO) | 13,777 | 4% | | 77% | 18% | 11,722 | 85.1% | 246 | 1.8% |
| N28 | Sindumin | Ahmad Bujang (BN–UMNO) | 8,024 | 63.7% | Harunsah Ibrahim (PR–PKR) | 3,701 | 29.4% | 4,323 | Ahmad Bujang (BN–UMNO) | 15,400 | 5% | | 42% | 52% | 12,587 | 81.7% | 340 | 2.2% |
| N28 | Sindumin | Ahmad Bujang (BN–UMNO) | 8,024 | 63.7% | Amde Sidik (SAPP) | 357 | 2.8% | 4,323 | Ahmad Bujang (BN–UMNO) | 15,400 | 5% | | 42% | 52% | 12,587 | 81.7% | 340 | 2.2% |
| N28 | Sindumin | Ahmad Bujang (BN–UMNO) | 8,024 | 63.7% | Semion Sakai (STAR) | 165 | 1.3% | 4,323 | Ahmad Bujang (BN–UMNO) | 15,400 | 5% | | 42% | 52% | 12,587 | 81.7% | 340 | 2.2% |
| N29 | Kundasang | Joachim Gunsalam (BN–PBS) | 4,206 | 40.9% | Satiol Indong (PR–PKR) | 2,231 | 21.7% | 1,975 | Joachim Gunsalam (BN–PBS) | 13,322 | | | 10% | 89% | 10,295 | 77.3% | 264 | 2.0% |
| N29 | Kundasang | Joachim Gunsalam (BN–PBS) | 4,206 | 40.9% | Japiril Suhaimin (SAPP) | 2,102 | 20.4% | 1,975 | Joachim Gunsalam (BN–PBS) | 13,322 | | | 10% | 89% | 10,295 | 77.3% | 264 | 2.0% |
| N29 | Kundasang | Joachim Gunsalam (BN–PBS) | 4,206 | 40.9% | Jain Sauting (STAR) | 1,117 | 10.8% | 1,975 | Joachim Gunsalam (BN–PBS) | 13,322 | | | 10% | 89% | 10,295 | 77.3% | 264 | 2.0% |
| N29 | Kundasang | Joachim Gunsalam (BN–PBS) | 4,206 | 40.9% | Sam Hondou (IND) | 288 | 2.8% | 1,975 | Joachim Gunsalam (BN–PBS) | 13,322 | | | 10% | 89% | 10,295 | 77.3% | 264 | 2.0% |
| N29 | Kundasang | Joachim Gunsalam (BN–PBS) | 4,206 | 40.9% | Cleftus Stephen Spine (IND) | 87 | 0.8% | 1,975 | Joachim Gunsalam (BN–PBS) | 13,322 | | | 10% | 89% | 10,295 | 77.3% | 264 | 2.0% |
| N30 | Karanaan | Masidi Manjun (BN–UMNO) | 6,292 | 60.9% | Muhiddin Yusin (PR–PKR) | 2,792 | 27.0% | 3,500 | Masidi Manjun (BN–UMNO) | 12,456 | 5% | | 11% | 84% | 10,331 | 83.1% | 149 | 1.4% |
| N30 | Karanaan | Masidi Manjun (BN–UMNO) | 6,292 | 60.9% | Jalidin Paidi (STAR) | 1,067 | 10.3% | 3,500 | Masidi Manjun (BN–UMNO) | 12,456 | 5% | | 11% | 84% | 10,331 | 83.1% | 149 | 1.4% |
| N30 | Karanaan | Masidi Manjun (BN–UMNO) | 6,292 | 60.9% | Mat Jaili Samat (IND) | 31 | 0.3% | 3,500 | Masidi Manjun (BN–UMNO) | 12,456 | 5% | | 11% | 84% | 10,331 | 83.1% | 149 | 1.4% |
| N31 | Paginatan | Siringan Gubat (BN–UPKO) | 5,142 | 47.7% | Amru Abd Kadir (PR–PKR) | 4,163 | 38.6% | 979 | Ewon Ebin (BN–UPKO) | 13,275 | 1% | | 11% | 88% | 10,772 | 81.1% | 174 | 1.3% |
| N31 | Paginatan | Siringan Gubat (BN–UPKO) | 5,142 | 47.7% | Pedderin Tuliang (STAR) | 1,139 | 10.6% | 979 | Ewon Ebin (BN–UPKO) | 13,275 | 1% | | 11% | 88% | 10,772 | 81.1% | 174 | 1.3% |
| N31 | Paginatan | Siringan Gubat (BN–UPKO) | 5,142 | 47.7% | Yazid Sahjinan (IND) | 154 | 1.4% | 979 | Ewon Ebin (BN–UPKO) | 13,275 | 1% | | 11% | 88% | 10,772 | 81.1% | 174 | 1.3% |
| N32 | Tambunan | Joseph Pairin Kitingan (BN–PBS) | 5,586 | 47.8% | Nestor Joannes (STAR) | 3,507 | 30.0% | 2,079 | Joseph Pairin Kitingan (BN–PBS) | 13,757 | 1% | | 13% | 86% | 11,683 | 84.9% | 192 | 1.4% |
| N32 | Tambunan | Joseph Pairin Kitingan (BN–PBS) | 5,586 | 47.8% | Wilfred Win Ponil (PR–PKR) | 1,744 | 14.9% | 2,079 | Joseph Pairin Kitingan (BN–PBS) | 13,757 | 1% | | 13% | 86% | 11,683 | 84.9% | 192 | 1.4% |
| N32 | Tambunan | Joseph Pairin Kitingan (BN–PBS) | 5,586 | 47.8% | Justin Yonsoding (IND) | 591 | 5.1% | 2,079 | Joseph Pairin Kitingan (BN–PBS) | 13,757 | 1% | | 13% | 86% | 11,683 | 84.9% | 192 | 1.4% |
| N32 | Tambunan | Joseph Pairin Kitingan (BN–PBS) | 5,586 | 47.8% | Koh Kui Tze (IND) | 63 | 0.5% | 2,079 | Joseph Pairin Kitingan (BN–PBS) | 13,757 | 1% | | 13% | 86% | 11,683 | 84.9% | 192 | 1.4% |
| N33 | Bingkor | Geoffrey Gapari Kitingan (STAR) | 5,350 | 41.4% | Kennedy Jie John (BN–UPKO) | 4,894 | 37.9% | 456 | Justin Guka (BN–UPKO) | 15,878 | 11% | | 18% | 70% | 12,908 | 81.3% | 185 | 1.2% |
| N33 | Bingkor | Geoffrey Gapari Kitingan (STAR) | 5,350 | 41.4% | Ahmad Shah Hussein Tambakau (PR–PKR) | 2,368 | 18.3% | 456 | Justin Guka (BN–UPKO) | 15,878 | 11% | | 18% | 70% | 12,908 | 81.3% | 185 | 1.2% |
| N33 | Bingkor | Geoffrey Gapari Kitingan (STAR) | 5,350 | 41.4% | Ricky Sedomon (IND) | 111 | 0.9% | 456 | Justin Guka (BN–UPKO) | 15,878 | 11% | | 18% | 70% | 12,908 | 81.3% | 185 | 1.2% |
| N34 | Liawan | Sapin Karano (BN–UMNO) | 5,383 | 46.8% | Paul Bunsu Gitang (PR–PKR) | 3,631 | 31.6% | 1,752 | Sairin Karno (BN–UMNO) | 14,056 | 16% | | 25% | 56% | 11,507 | 81.9% | 172 | 1.2% |
| N34 | Liawan | Sapin Karano (BN–UMNO) | 5,383 | 46.8% | Nicholas James Guntobon (STAR) | 2,067 | 18.0% | 1,752 | Sairin Karno (BN–UMNO) | 14,056 | 16% | | 25% | 56% | 11,507 | 81.9% | 172 | 1.2% |
| N34 | Liawan | Sapin Karano (BN–UMNO) | 5,383 | 46.8% | Pauket Yadiloh (SAPP) | 236 | 2.1% | 1,752 | Sairin Karno (BN–UMNO) | 14,056 | 16% | | 25% | 56% | 11,507 | 81.9% | 172 | 1.2% |
| N34 | Liawan | Sapin Karano (BN–UMNO) | 5,383 | 46.8% | Nusleh Madarak (IND) | 18 | 0.2% | 1,752 | Sairin Karno (BN–UMNO) | 14,056 | 16% | | 25% | 56% | 11,507 | 81.9% | 172 | 1.2% |
| N35 | Melalap | Radin Malleh (BN–PBS) | 4,643 | 47.3% | Roger Stimin (SAPP) | 2,044 | 20.8% | 2,599 | Radin Malleh (BN–PBS) | 12,074 | 19% | | 22% | 59% | 9,825 | 81.4% | 222 | 1.8% |
| N35 | Melalap | Radin Malleh (BN–PBS) | 4,643 | 47.3% | Noorita Sual (PR–DAP) | 1,992 | 20.3% | 2,599 | Radin Malleh (BN–PBS) | 12,074 | 19% | | 22% | 59% | 9,825 | 81.4% | 222 | 1.8% |
| N35 | Melalap | Radin Malleh (BN–PBS) | 4,643 | 47.3% | Kong Fui Seng (STAR) | 924 | 9.4% | 2,599 | Radin Malleh (BN–PBS) | 12,074 | 19% | | 22% | 59% | 9,825 | 81.4% | 222 | 1.8% |
| N36 | Kemabong | Rubin Balang (BN–UMNO) | 5,765 | 51.9% | Biou Suyan (PR–PKR) | 2,733 | 24.6% | 3,032 | Rubin Balang (BN–UMNO) | 13,230 | 6% | | 20% | 73% | 11,104 | 83.9% | 404 | 3.1% |
| N36 | Kemabong | Rubin Balang (BN–UMNO) | 5,765 | 51.9% | Tay Jin Kiong (STAR) | 1,155 | 10.4% | 3,032 | Rubin Balang (BN–UMNO) | 13,230 | 6% | | 20% | 73% | 11,104 | 83.9% | 404 | 3.1% |
| N36 | Kemabong | Rubin Balang (BN–UMNO) | 5,765 | 51.9% | William Ensor Tingkalor (SAPP) | 1,047 | 9.4% | 3,032 | Rubin Balang (BN–UMNO) | 13,230 | 6% | | 20% | 73% | 11,104 | 83.9% | 404 | 3.1% |
| N37 | Sook | Ellron Alfred Angin (BN–PBRS) | 7,223 | 53.4% | Kustin Ladi (STAR) | 2,828 | 20.9% | 4,395 | Ellron Angin (BN–PBRS) | 16,354 | 2% | | 12% | 86% | 13,535 | 82.8% | 301 | 1.8% |
| N37 | Sook | Ellron Alfred Angin (BN–PBRS) | 7,223 | 53.4% | Liberty Lopog (PR–PKR) | 1,911 | 14.1% | 4,395 | Ellron Angin (BN–PBRS) | 16,354 | 2% | | 12% | 86% | 13,535 | 82.8% | 301 | 1.8% |
| N37 | Sook | Ellron Alfred Angin (BN–PBRS) | 7,223 | 53.4% | Chong Yu Chee (SAPP) | 1,226 | 9.1% | 4,395 | Ellron Angin (BN–PBRS) | 16,354 | 2% | | 12% | 86% | 13,535 | 82.8% | 301 | 1.8% |
| N37 | Sook | Ellron Alfred Angin (BN–PBRS) | 7,223 | 53.4% | Rusayidi Abdullah (IND) | 46 | 0.3% | 4,395 | Ellron Angin (BN–PBRS) | 16,354 | 2% | | 12% | 86% | 13,535 | 82.8% | 301 | 1.8% |
| N38 | Nabawan | Bobbey Ah Fang Suan (BN–UPKO) | 3,816 | 48.6% | Raymond Ahuar (PR–PKR) | 3,474 | 44.3% | 342 | Bobbey Ah Fang Suan (BN–UPKO) | 9,840 | 1% | | 13% | 86% | 7,844 | 79.7% | 185 | 1.9% |
| N38 | Nabawan | Bobbey Ah Fang Suan (BN–UPKO) | 3,816 | 48.6% | George Eram (STAR) | 310 | 4.0% | 342 | Bobbey Ah Fang Suan (BN–UPKO) | 9,840 | 1% | | 13% | 86% | 7,844 | 79.7% | 185 | 1.9% |
| N38 | Nabawan | Bobbey Ah Fang Suan (BN–UPKO) | 3,816 | 48.6% | Sidum Manjin (MUPP) | 41 | 0.5% | 342 | Bobbey Ah Fang Suan (BN–UPKO) | 9,840 | 1% | | 13% | 86% | 7,844 | 79.7% | 185 | 1.9% |
| N38 | Nabawan | Bobbey Ah Fang Suan (BN–UPKO) | 3,816 | 48.6% | Fatimah Agitor (IND) | 18 | 0.2% | 342 | Bobbey Ah Fang Suan (BN–UPKO) | 9,840 | 1% | | 13% | 86% | 7,844 | 79.7% | 185 | 1.9% |
| N39 | Sugut | James Ratib (BN–UMNO) | 4,285 | 59.7% | Abdul Rahman Atang (IND) | 1,465 | 20.4% | 2,820 | Surady Kayong (BN–UMNO) | 9,675 | | 3% | 32% | 64% | 7,175 | 74.2% | 326 | 3.4% |
| N39 | Sugut | James Ratib (BN–UMNO) | 4,285 | 59.7% | Pagrios Zabang (PR–PKR) | 647 | 9.0% | 2,820 | Surady Kayong (BN–UMNO) | 9,675 | | 3% | 32% | 64% | 7,175 | 74.2% | 326 | 3.4% |
| N39 | Sugut | James Ratib (BN–UMNO) | 4,285 | 59.7% | Masiawan Kunching (STAR) | 341 | 4.8% | 2,820 | Surady Kayong (BN–UMNO) | 9,675 | | 3% | 32% | 64% | 7,175 | 74.2% | 326 | 3.4% |
| N39 | Sugut | James Ratib (BN–UMNO) | 4,285 | 59.7% | Kamaruddin Mustapha (IND) | 111 | 1.5% | 2,820 | Surady Kayong (BN–UMNO) | 9,675 | | 3% | 32% | 64% | 7,175 | 74.2% | 326 | 3.4% |
| N40 | Labuk | Metah Asang (BN–PBS) | 7,408 | 63.1% | Tang Yung Hi (PR–PKR) | 2,882 | 24.6% | 4,526 | Metah @ Micheal Asang (BN–PBS) | 15,013 | | 2% | 45% | 52% | 11,737 | 78.2% | 209 | 1.4% |
| N40 | Labuk | Metah Asang (BN–PBS) | 7,408 | 63.1% | Pinus Gondili (STAR) | 1,238 | 10.5% | 4,526 | Metah @ Micheal Asang (BN–PBS) | 15,013 | | 2% | 45% | 52% | 11,737 | 78.2% | 209 | 1.4% |
| N41 | Gum-Gum | Zakaria Mohd Edris (BN–UMNO) | 5,548 | 60.2% | Ahmad Thamrin Mohd Jaini (PR–PKR) | 3,191 | 34.6% | 2,357 | Zakaria Mohd Edris @ Tubau (BN–UMNO) | 11,734 | 26% | | 50% | 18% | 9,220 | 78.6% | 180 | 1.5% |
| N41 | Gum-Gum | Zakaria Mohd Edris (BN–UMNO) | 5,548 | 60.2% | Hassan Hami (STAR) | 301 | 3.3% | 2,357 | Zakaria Mohd Edris @ Tubau (BN–UMNO) | 11,734 | 26% | | 50% | 18% | 9,220 | 78.6% | 180 | 1.5% |
| N42 | Sungai Sibuga | Musa Aman (BN–UMNO) | 16,637 | 73.0% | Irwanshah Mustapa (PR–PKR) | 5,068 | 22.2% | 11,569 | Musa Aman (BN–UMNO) | 28,038 | 18% | | 61% | 14% | 22,800 | 81.3% | 414 | 1.5% |
| N42 | Sungai Sibuga | Musa Aman (BN–UMNO) | 16,637 | 73.0% | A M Jaffar Juana (SAPP) | 265 | 1.2% | 11,569 | Musa Aman (BN–UMNO) | 28,038 | 18% | | 61% | 14% | 22,800 | 81.3% | 414 | 1.5% |
| N42 | Sungai Sibuga | Musa Aman (BN–UMNO) | 16,637 | 73.0% | Mohd Roslan Yussof (STAR) | 215 | 0.9% | 11,569 | Musa Aman (BN–UMNO) | 28,038 | 18% | | 61% | 14% | 22,800 | 81.3% | 414 | 1.5% |
| N42 | Sungai Sibuga | Musa Aman (BN–UMNO) | 16,637 | 73.0% | Mohd Arshad Abdul (IND) | 201 | 0.9% | 11,569 | Musa Aman (BN–UMNO) | 28,038 | 18% | | 61% | 14% | 22,800 | 81.3% | 414 | 1.5% |
| N43 | Sekong | Samsudin Yahya (BN–UMNO) | 6,898 | 62.0% | Musah Ghani (PR–PKR) | 3,368 | 30.3% | 3,530 | Samsudin Yahya (BN–UMNO) | 14,247 | 22% | | 60% | 9% | 11,121 | 78.1% | 351 | 2.5% |
| N43 | Sekong | Samsudin Yahya (BN–UMNO) | 6,898 | 62.0% | Awang Othman (SAPP) | 354 | 3.2% | 3,530 | Samsudin Yahya (BN–UMNO) | 14,247 | 22% | | 60% | 9% | 11,121 | 78.1% | 351 | 2.5% |
| N43 | Sekong | Samsudin Yahya (BN–UMNO) | 6,898 | 62.0% | Ahmad Ibrahim (STAR) | 100 | 0.9% | 3,530 | Samsudin Yahya (BN–UMNO) | 14,247 | 22% | | 60% | 9% | 11,121 | 78.1% | 351 | 2.5% |
| N43 | Sekong | Samsudin Yahya (BN–UMNO) | 6,898 | 62.0% | Ilahan Amilbangsa (IND) | 50 | 0.4% | 3,530 | Samsudin Yahya (BN–UMNO) | 14,247 | 22% | | 60% | 9% | 11,121 | 78.1% | 351 | 2.5% |
| N44 | Karamunting | Charles O Pang Su Pin (BN–LDP) | 6,235 | 50.9% | Chong Ket Kiun (PR–DAP) | 5,380 | 43.9% | 855 | Peter Pang En Yin (BN–GERAKAN) | 15,952 | 44% | | 44% | 7% | 12,245 | 76.8% | 278 | 1.7% |
| N44 | Karamunting | Charles O Pang Su Pin (BN–LDP) | 6,235 | 50.9% | Yong Vui Min (SAPP) | 352 | 2.9% | 855 | Peter Pang En Yin (BN–GERAKAN) | 15,952 | 44% | | 44% | 7% | 12,245 | 76.8% | 278 | 1.7% |
| N45 | Elopura | Au Kam Wah (BN–GERAKAN) | 8,105 | 48.5% | Hiew Vun Zin (PR–DAP) | 7,854 | 47.0% | 251 | Au Kam Yah (BN–GERAKAN) | 22,317 | 53% | | 33% | 9% | 16,709 | 74.9% | 281 | 1.3% |
| N45 | Elopura | Au Kam Wah (BN–GERAKAN) | 8,105 | 48.5% | Liau Fook Kong (SAPP) | 469 | 2.8% | 251 | Au Kam Yah (BN–GERAKAN) | 22,317 | 53% | | 33% | 9% | 16,709 | 74.9% | 281 | 1.3% |
| N46 | Tanjong Papat | Raymond Tan Shu Kiah (BN–GERAKAN) | 6,153 | 55.0% | Frankie Poon Ming Fung (PR–DAP) | 4,631 | 41.4% | 1,522 | Raymond Tan Shu Kiah (BN–GERAKAN) | 14,741 | 54% | | 36% | 6% | 11,181 | 75.8% | 206 | 1.4% |
| N46 | Tanjong Papat | Raymond Tan Shu Kiah (BN–GERAKAN) | 6,153 | 55.0% | Yong Chie Man (SAPP) | 191 | 1.7% | 1,522 | Raymond Tan Shu Kiah (BN–GERAKAN) | 14,741 | 54% | | 36% | 6% | 11,181 | 75.8% | 206 | 1.4% |
| N47 | Kuamut | Masiung Banah (BN–UPKO) | 7,607 | 62.7% | Mustapa Tambuyong (PR–PKR) | 2,989 | 24.6% | 4,618 | Masiung Banah (BN–UPKO) | 14,915 | | 4% | 32% | 63% | 12,142 | 81.4% | 350 | 2.3% |
| N47 | Kuamut | Masiung Banah (BN–UPKO) | 7,607 | 62.7% | Edward Podok (STAR) | 1,196 | 9.9% | 4,618 | Masiung Banah (BN–UPKO) | 14,915 | | 4% | 32% | 63% | 12,142 | 81.4% | 350 | 2.3% |
| N48 | Sukau | Saddi Abdul Rahman (BN–UMNO) | 5,851 | 74.9% | Ahdah Sulaiman (PR–PAS) | 1,432 | 18.3% | 4,419 | Saddi Abdul Rahman (BN–UMNO) | 9,833 | | 8% | 57% | 34% | 7,813 | 79.5% | 244 | 2.5% |
| N48 | Sukau | Saddi Abdul Rahman (BN–UMNO) | 5,851 | 74.9% | Juhori Paritai (STAR) | 197 | 2.5% | 4,419 | Saddi Abdul Rahman (BN–UMNO) | 9,833 | | 8% | 57% | 34% | 7,813 | 79.5% | 244 | 2.5% |
| N48 | Sukau | Saddi Abdul Rahman (BN–UMNO) | 5,851 | 74.9% | Aprin Musin (SAPP) | 89 | 1.1% | 4,419 | Saddi Abdul Rahman (BN–UMNO) | 9,833 | | 8% | 57% | 34% | 7,813 | 79.5% | 244 | 2.5% |
| N49 | Tungku | Mohd Suhaili Said (BN–UMNO) | 7,848 | 69.4% | Johani Abd Halim (PR–PKR) | 2,364 | 20.9% | 5,484 | Mohd Suhaili Said (BN–UMNO) | 14,626 | 11% | | 62% | 19% | 11,305 | 77.3% | 287 | 2.0% |
| N49 | Tungku | Mohd Suhaili Said (BN–UMNO) | 7,848 | 69.4% | Shuaib Mutalib (SAPP) | 373 | 3.3% | 5,484 | Mohd Suhaili Said (BN–UMNO) | 14,626 | 11% | | 62% | 19% | 11,305 | 77.3% | 287 | 2.0% |
| N49 | Tungku | Mohd Suhaili Said (BN–UMNO) | 7,848 | 69.4% | Johan Nul (STAR) | 337 | 3.0% | 5,484 | Mohd Suhaili Said (BN–UMNO) | 14,626 | 11% | | 62% | 19% | 11,305 | 77.3% | 287 | 2.0% |
| N49 | Tungku | Mohd Suhaili Said (BN–UMNO) | 7,848 | 69.4% | Tsen Yun Fah (IND) | 96 | 0.8% | 5,484 | Mohd Suhaili Said (BN–UMNO) | 14,626 | 11% | | 62% | 19% | 11,305 | 77.3% | 287 | 2.0% |
| N50 | Lahad Datu | Mohammad Yusoff Apdal (BN–UMNO) | 12,949 | 67.5% | Hamid Awong (PR–PKR) | 4,534 | 23.6% | 8,415 | Nasrun Mansur (BN–UMNO) | 25,232 | 18% | | 56% | 14% | 19,187 | 76.0% | 451 | 1.8% |
| N50 | Lahad Datu | Mohammad Yusoff Apdal (BN–UMNO) | 12,949 | 67.5% | Aliandu Enjil (SAPP) | 912 | 4.8% | 8,415 | Nasrun Mansur (BN–UMNO) | 25,232 | 18% | | 56% | 14% | 19,187 | 76.0% | 451 | 1.8% |
| N50 | Lahad Datu | Mohammad Yusoff Apdal (BN–UMNO) | 12,949 | 67.5% | Ariffin Hamid (STAR) | 341 | 1.8% | 8,415 | Nasrun Mansur (BN–UMNO) | 25,232 | 18% | | 56% | 14% | 19,187 | 76.0% | 451 | 1.8% |
| N51 | Kunak | Nilwan Kabang (BN–UMNO) | 6,394 | 70.2% | Hussein Ibnu Hassan (IND) | 1,034 | 11.4% | 5,360 | Nilwan Kabang (BN–UMNO) | 11,804 | | 10% | 82% | 5% | 9,106 | 77.1% | 295 | 2.5% |
| N51 | Kunak | Nilwan Kabang (BN–UMNO) | 6,394 | 70.2% | Kasman Karate (PR–PAS) | 1,002 | 11.0% | 5,360 | Nilwan Kabang (BN–UMNO) | 11,804 | | 10% | 82% | 5% | 9,106 | 77.1% | 295 | 2.5% |
| N51 | Kunak | Nilwan Kabang (BN–UMNO) | 6,394 | 70.2% | Valentine Sebastian (STAR) | 200 | 2.2% | 5,360 | Nilwan Kabang (BN–UMNO) | 11,804 | | 10% | 82% | 5% | 9,106 | 77.1% | 295 | 2.5% |
| N51 | Kunak | Nilwan Kabang (BN–UMNO) | 6,394 | 70.2% | Sharif Shamsuddin Sharif Sagaf (IND) | 117 | 1.3% | 5,360 | Nilwan Kabang (BN–UMNO) | 11,804 | | 10% | 82% | 5% | 9,106 | 77.1% | 295 | 2.5% |
| N51 | Kunak | Nilwan Kabang (BN–UMNO) | 6,394 | 70.2% | Abd Sattal Shafiee (IND) | 64 | 0.7% | 5,360 | Nilwan Kabang (BN–UMNO) | 11,804 | | 10% | 82% | 5% | 9,106 | 77.1% | 295 | 2.5% |
| N52 | Sulabayan | Jaujan Sambakong (BN–UMNO) | 6,546 | 69.5% | Hermeny Murgal (PR–PKR) | 1,417 | 15.1% | 5,129 | Harman Mohamad (BN–UMNO) | 12,642 | | 2% | 98% | | 9,413 | 74.5% | 499 | 3.9% |
| N52 | Sulabayan | Jaujan Sambakong (BN–UMNO) | 6,546 | 69.5% | Hussein Mumakil (IND) | 347 | 3.7% | 5,129 | Harman Mohamad (BN–UMNO) | 12,642 | | 2% | 98% | | 9,413 | 74.5% | 499 | 3.9% |
| N52 | Sulabayan | Jaujan Sambakong (BN–UMNO) | 6,546 | 69.5% | Hasaman Sagaran (MUPP) | 227 | 2.4% | 5,129 | Harman Mohamad (BN–UMNO) | 12,642 | | 2% | 98% | | 9,413 | 74.5% | 499 | 3.9% |
| N52 | Sulabayan | Jaujan Sambakong (BN–UMNO) | 6,546 | 69.5% | Ghazalie Pg Hindi (IND) | 196 | 2.1% | 5,129 | Harman Mohamad (BN–UMNO) | 12,642 | | 2% | 98% | | 9,413 | 74.5% | 499 | 3.9% |
| N52 | Sulabayan | Jaujan Sambakong (BN–UMNO) | 6,546 | 69.5% | Julkalani Abd Rahman (IND) | 107 | 1.1% | 5,129 | Harman Mohamad (BN–UMNO) | 12,642 | | 2% | 98% | | 9,413 | 74.5% | 499 | 3.9% |
| N52 | Sulabayan | Jaujan Sambakong (BN–UMNO) | 6,546 | 69.5% | Mamat Barhana (IND) | 74 | 0.8% | 5,129 | Harman Mohamad (BN–UMNO) | 12,642 | | 2% | 98% | | 9,413 | 74.5% | 499 | 3.9% |
| N53 | Senallang | Nasir Sakaran (BN–UMNO) | 7,425 | 73.4% | Mohd Amin Abdul Mem (PR–PKR) | 1,516 | 15.0% | 5,909 | Nasir Sakaran (BN–UMNO) | 13,210 | 5% | 2% | 92% | | 10,122 | 76.6% | 326 | 2.5% |
| N53 | Senallang | Nasir Sakaran (BN–UMNO) | 7,425 | 73.4% | Abdul Manang Hatib Lawari (IND) | 546 | 5.4% | 5,909 | Nasir Sakaran (BN–UMNO) | 13,210 | 5% | 2% | 92% | | 10,122 | 76.6% | 326 | 2.5% |
| N53 | Senallang | Nasir Sakaran (BN–UMNO) | 7,425 | 73.4% | Badaruddin Mustapha (IND) | 164 | 1.6% | 5,909 | Nasir Sakaran (BN–UMNO) | 13,210 | 5% | 2% | 92% | | 10,122 | 76.6% | 326 | 2.5% |
| N53 | Senallang | Nasir Sakaran (BN–UMNO) | 7,425 | 73.4% | Ab Karim Talip (IND) | 145 | 1.4% | 5,909 | Nasir Sakaran (BN–UMNO) | 13,210 | 5% | 2% | 92% | | 10,122 | 76.6% | 326 | 2.5% |
| N54 | Bugaya | Ramlee Marhaban (BN–UMNO) | 6,642 | 55.5% | Abdul Hussin Kiamsin (IND) | 3,139 | 26.2% | 3,503 | Ramlee Marhaban (BN–UMNO) | 15,697 | | 2% | 96% | 1% | 11,968 | 76.2% | 455 | 2.9% |
| N54 | Bugaya | Ramlee Marhaban (BN–UMNO) | 6,642 | 55.5% | Hasai Tudai (PR–PAS) | 702 | 5.9% | 3,503 | Ramlee Marhaban (BN–UMNO) | 15,697 | | 2% | 96% | 1% | 11,968 | 76.2% | 455 | 2.9% |
| N54 | Bugaya | Ramlee Marhaban (BN–UMNO) | 6,642 | 55.5% | Alimin Budin (IND) | 638 | 5.3% | 3,503 | Ramlee Marhaban (BN–UMNO) | 15,697 | | 2% | 96% | 1% | 11,968 | 76.2% | 455 | 2.9% |
| N54 | Bugaya | Ramlee Marhaban (BN–UMNO) | 6,642 | 55.5% | Atal Muhammad K K Abd Menang (IND) | 201 | 1.7% | 3,503 | Ramlee Marhaban (BN–UMNO) | 15,697 | | 2% | 96% | 1% | 11,968 | 76.2% | 455 | 2.9% |
| N54 | Bugaya | Ramlee Marhaban (BN–UMNO) | 6,642 | 55.5% | Abdullah Sani Abdul Salleh (IND) | 191 | 1.6% | 3,503 | Ramlee Marhaban (BN–UMNO) | 15,697 | | 2% | 96% | 1% | 11,968 | 76.2% | 455 | 2.9% |
| N55 | Balung | Syed Abas Syed Ali (BN–UMNO) | 7,843 | 73.4% | Frank Salazar (PR–PKR) | 2,274 | 21.3% | 5,569 | Syed Abas Syed Ali (BN–UMNO) | 13,526 | | 14% | 72% | 8% | 10,692 | 79.0% | 195 | 1.4% |
| N55 | Balung | Syed Abas Syed Ali (BN–UMNO) | 7,843 | 73.4% | Abdul Hamid Amit Mohammad Noor (SAPP) | 200 | 1.9% | 5,569 | Syed Abas Syed Ali (BN–UMNO) | 13,526 | | 14% | 72% | 8% | 10,692 | 79.0% | 195 | 1.4% |
| N55 | Balung | Syed Abas Syed Ali (BN–UMNO) | 7,843 | 73.4% | Mohd Abdillah Timbasal (IND) | 180 | 1.7% | 5,569 | Syed Abas Syed Ali (BN–UMNO) | 13,526 | | 14% | 72% | 8% | 10,692 | 79.0% | 195 | 1.4% |
| N56 | Apas | Tawfiq Abu Bakar Titingan (BN–UMNO) | 9,013 | 72.4% | Alizaman Jijurahman (PR–PKR) | 2,891 | 23.2% | 6,122 | Tawfiq Abu Bakar Titingan (BN–UMNO) | 15,837 | 20% | 8% | 70% | | 12,455 | 78.6% | 327 | 2.1% |
| N56 | Apas | Tawfiq Abu Bakar Titingan (BN–UMNO) | 9,013 | 72.4% | Tahir Dahu (SAPP) | 149 | 1.2% | 6,122 | Tawfiq Abu Bakar Titingan (BN–UMNO) | 15,837 | 20% | 8% | 70% | | 12,455 | 78.6% | 327 | 2.1% |
| N56 | Apas | Tawfiq Abu Bakar Titingan (BN–UMNO) | 9,013 | 72.4% | Chok Yit Min (STAR) | 75 | 0.6% | 6,122 | Tawfiq Abu Bakar Titingan (BN–UMNO) | 15,837 | 20% | 8% | 70% | | 12,455 | 78.6% | 327 | 2.1% |
| N57 | Sri Tanjong | Chan Foong Hin (PR–DAP) | 10,948 | 66.1% | Fung Len Fui (BN–PBS) | 5,021 | 30.3% | 5,927 | Jimmy Wong Sze Phin (PR–DAP) | 22,175 | 70% | 5% | 23% | | 16,558 | 74.9% | 201 | 0.9% |
| N57 | Sri Tanjong | Chan Foong Hin (PR–DAP) | 10,948 | 66.1% | Yong Ah Poh (SAPP) | 260 | 1.6% | 5,927 | Jimmy Wong Sze Phin (PR–DAP) | 22,175 | 70% | 5% | 23% | | 16,558 | 74.9% | 201 | 0.9% |
| N57 | Sri Tanjong | Chan Foong Hin (PR–DAP) | 10,948 | 66.1% | Olivia Chong Oi Yun (STAR) | 128 | 0.8% | 5,927 | Jimmy Wong Sze Phin (PR–DAP) | 22,175 | 70% | 5% | 23% | | 16,558 | 74.9% | 201 | 0.9% |
| N58 | Merotai | Pang Yuk Ming (BN–LDP) | 8,045 | 56.8% | Ahmad Dullah (PR–PAS) | 3,957 | 27.9% | 4,088 | Pang Yuk Ming (BN–LDP) | 18,317 | 21% | 12% | 62% | | 14,162 | 77.3% | 238 | 1.3% |
| N58 | Merotai | Pang Yuk Ming (BN–LDP) | 8,045 | 56.8% | Chin Chee Syn (IND) | 1,255 | 8.9% | 4,088 | Pang Yuk Ming (BN–LDP) | 18,317 | 21% | 12% | 62% | | 14,162 | 77.3% | 238 | 1.3% |
| N58 | Merotai | Pang Yuk Ming (BN–LDP) | 8,045 | 56.8% | Mohd Manuke (IND) | 342 | 2.4% | 4,088 | Pang Yuk Ming (BN–LDP) | 18,317 | 21% | 12% | 62% | | 14,162 | 77.3% | 238 | 1.3% |
| N58 | Merotai | Pang Yuk Ming (BN–LDP) | 8,045 | 56.8% | Ho Shau Vui (SAPP) | 221 | 1.6% | 4,088 | Pang Yuk Ming (BN–LDP) | 18,317 | 21% | 12% | 62% | | 14,162 | 77.3% | 238 | 1.3% |
| N58 | Merotai | Pang Yuk Ming (BN–LDP) | 8,045 | 56.8% | Rita Rudianshah Abu Bakar (IND) | 104 | 0.7% | 4,088 | Pang Yuk Ming (BN–LDP) | 18,317 | 21% | 12% | 62% | | 14,162 | 77.3% | 238 | 1.3% |
| N59 | Tanjong Batu | Hamisa Samat (BN–UMNO) | 10,858 | 75.7% | Fatmawaty Mohd Yusuf (PR–PAS) | 3,228 | 22.5% | 7,630 | Hamisa Samat (BN–UMNO) | 18,386 | | 15% | 73% | 8% | 14,338 | 78.0% | 252 | 1.4% |
| N60 | Sebatik | Abdul Muis Picho (BN–UMNO) | 5,484 | 72.2% | Daud Jalaluddin (PR–PAS) | 1,344 | 17.7% | 4,140 | Abd Muis Picho (BN–UMNO) | 10,090 | 7% | 8% | 78% | | 7,595 | 75.3% | 293 | 2.9% |
| N60 | Sebatik | Abdul Muis Picho (BN–UMNO) | 5,484 | 72.2% | Mohammad Yusup Lewah (IND) | 249 | 3.3% | 4,140 | Abd Muis Picho (BN–UMNO) | 10,090 | 7% | 8% | 78% | | 7,595 | 75.3% | 293 | 2.9% |
| N60 | Sebatik | Abdul Muis Picho (BN–UMNO) | 5,484 | 72.2% | Mohammad Jeffry Rosman (STAR) | 225 | 3.0% | 4,140 | Abd Muis Picho (BN–UMNO) | 10,090 | 7% | 8% | 78% | | 7,595 | 75.3% | 293 | 2.9% |
