= Manogaran Marimuthu =

Malaysian politician and lawyer

Member of the Malaysian Parliament for Teluk Intan
- In office 8 March 2008 – 5 May 2013
- Preceded by: Mah Siew Keong (BN–Gerakan)
- Succeeded by: Seah Leong Peng (PR–DAP)
- Majority: 1,470 (2008)

Personal details
- Born: Manogaran s/o Marimuthu; 14 July 1959 (age 66) Penang, Federation of Malaya (now Malaysia)
- Citizenship: Malaysian
- Party: Democratic Action Party (DAP)
- Other political affiliations: Pakatan Rakyat (PR) (2008–2015); Pakatan Harapan (PH) (since 2015)
- Children: 4 (including Thulsi Thivani Manogaran (daughter))
- Occupation: Politician
- Profession: Lawyer
- Website: manogaran.wordpress.com
- Manogaran Marimuthu on Facebook

Manogaran s/o Marimuthu (born 14 July 1959), commonly referred to as M. Manogaran is a Malaysian politician and lawyer who served as the Member of Parliament (MP) for Teluk Intan from March 2008 to May 2013. He is a member and State Deputy Chairman of Pahang of the Democratic Action Party (DAP), a component party of the Pakatan Harapan (PH) and formerly Pakatan Rakyat (PR) coalitions. He is also the father of Thulsi Thivani Manogaran, Member of the Perak State Legislative Assembly (MLA) for Buntong and a co-founder of the Tamil Foundation of Malaysia.

Manogaran has four children who are three daughters and a son. His eldest child and daughter is Thulsi Thivani. In the 2008 general election, Manogaran was nominated by PR to contest the Teluk Intan federal seat. He won the seat and was elected to Parliament as the Teluk Intan MP after defeating Deputy Minister of Agriculture and Agro-based Industries, defending MP and Youth Chief of the Parti Gerakan Rakyat Malaysia (Gerakan) Mah Siew Keong of Barisan Nasional (BN). He contested the parliamentary seat of Cameron Highlands, Pahang in the 2013 general election, and was defeated by government minister Palanivel Govindasamy who was the Malaysian Indian Congress (MIC) President then.

In the 2018 general election, he ran again for the Cameron Highlands seat but lost again in a five-corners contest this time to MIC Vice-President Sivarraajh Chandran by 597 votes majority. However the victory was nullified by the Election Court on 30 November 2018 after it allowed the election petition filed by Manogaran that corrupt practices were committed by Sivarraajh in the 14th general election. He was picked as the PH candidate to re-contest again in the four-cornered fight in 2019 Cameron Highlands by-election. But he lost again to Barisan Nasional (BN)'s indigenous Orang Asli direct candidate Ramli Mohd Nor in the by-election.

== Controversies ==
On 3 April 2010, Manogaran was arrested for holding demonstration with activists at Batu Caves to protest the usage of "Interlok" novel which contained derogatory words to Malaysian Indians community in the syllabus for the Malay Literature subject as compulsory reading for students in Form 5 (Secondary 5) in schools throughout Malaysia.

On 9 January 2019 Manogaran as the PH candidate for the 2019 Cameron Highlands by-election had made insensitive remarks citing the perception that "Malays don't even buy kuih from Orang Asli vendors" analogy regarding BN fielding Orang Asli candidate causing him to apologise and express regrets for his action only a day later. On Polling Day, M. Manogaran, wore a shirt bearing party logo to a polling station against the election rules and he was asked to leave by the Election Commission (EC)’s officer.

== Election results ==
Parliament of Malaysia
Year	Constituency	Candidate	Votes	Pct	Opponent(s)	Votes	Pct	Ballots cast	Majority	Turnout
2008	P076 Telok Intan	Manogaran Marimuthu (DAP)	18,846	52.07%	Mah Siew Keong (Gerakan)	17,016	47.93%	36,739	1,470	70.17%
2013	P078 Cameron Highlands	Manogaran Marimuthu (DAP)	10,044	45.92%	Palanivel Govindasamy (MIC)	10,506	48.03%	22,752	462	81.32%
2013	P078 Cameron Highlands	Manogaran Marimuthu (DAP)	10,044	45.92%	Mohd Shokri Mahmood (BERJASA)	912	4.17%	22,752	462	81.32%
2013	P078 Cameron Highlands	Manogaran Marimuthu (DAP)	10,044	45.92%	Alagu Thangarajoo (IND)	308	1.41%	22,752	462	81.32%
2013	P078 Cameron Highlands	Manogaran Marimuthu (DAP)	10,044	45.92%	Kisho Kumar Kathirveloo (IND)	101	0.46%	22,752	462	81.32%
2018	P078 Cameron Highlands	Manogaran Marimuthu (DAP)	9,710	39.85%	Sivarraajh Chandran (MIC)^{1}	10,307	42.30%	24,365	597	76.03%
2018	P078 Cameron Highlands	Manogaran Marimuthu (DAP)	9,710	39.85%	Wan Mahadir Wan Mahmud (PAS)	3,587	14.72%	24,365	597	76.03%
2018	P078 Cameron Highlands	Manogaran Marimuthu (DAP)	9,710	39.85%	Suresh Kumar Balasubramaniam (PSM)	680	2.79%	24,365	597	76.03%
2018	P078 Cameron Highlands	Manogaran Marimuthu (DAP)	9,710	39.85%	Mohd Tahir Haji Kassim (BERJASA)	81	0.33%	24,365	597	76.03%
2019	P078 Cameron Highlands	Manogaran Marimuthu (DAP)	8,800	41.07%	Ramli Mohd Nor (BN)	12,038	56.18%	22,019	3,238	68.79%
2019	P078 Cameron Highlands	Manogaran Marimuthu (DAP)	8,800	41.07%	Sallehudin Ab Talib (IND)	314	1.47%	22,019	3,238	68.79%
2019	P078 Cameron Highlands	Manogaran Marimuthu (DAP)	8,800	41.07%	Wong Seng Yee (IND)	276	1.29%	22,019	3,238	68.79%

Note: ^{1} The Election Court has on the 30 November 2018, nullified Sivarraajh's election for the element of corrupted practices and enabled 2019 Cameron Highlands by-election to be held. Sivarraajh was banned for five years.
