= Tempok =

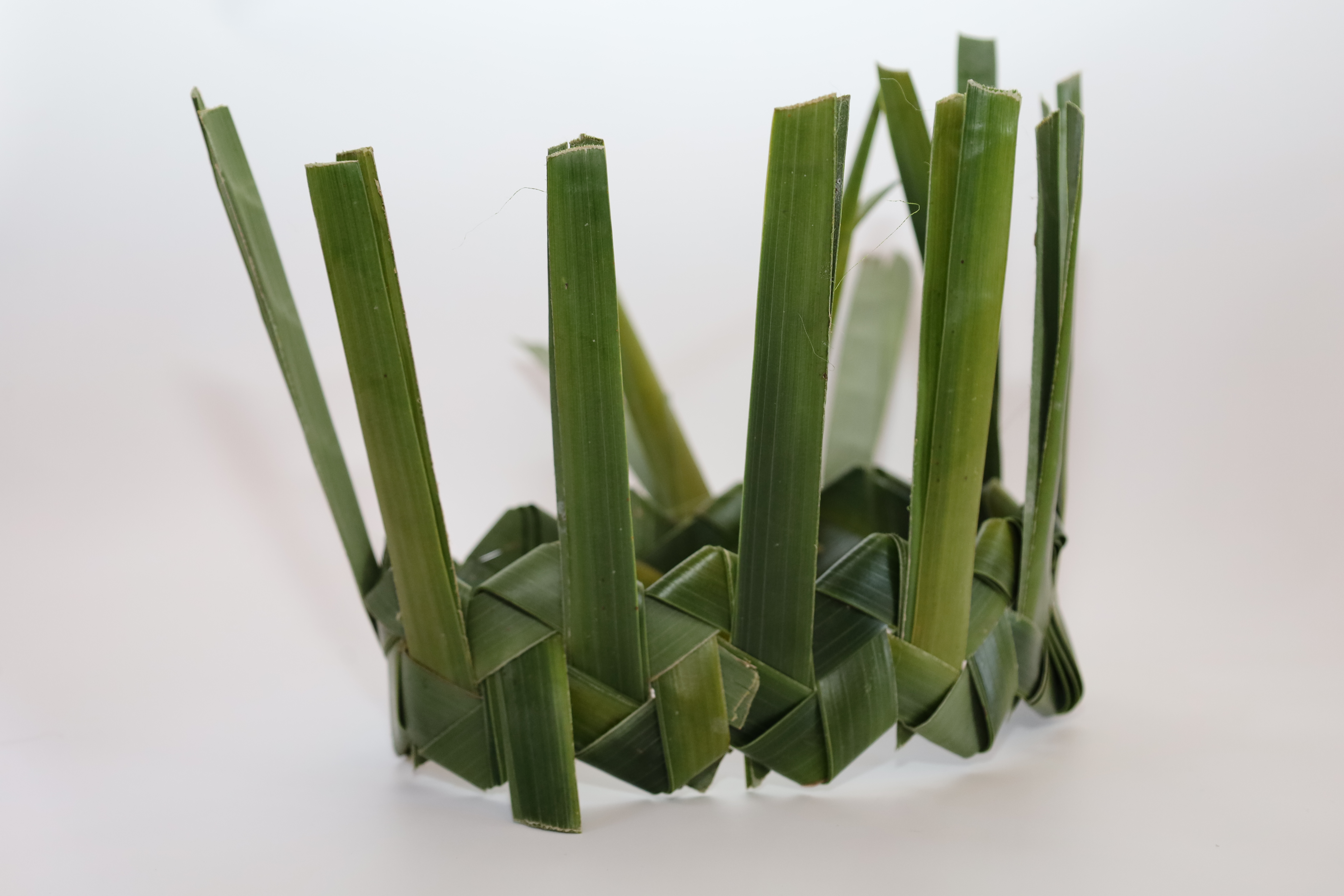
Daun kelapa style tempok used by the Negrito people.

Tempok or tempo (also known as boh hor, sajak, and ta jug) are common names for traditional headgears of indigenous Proto-Malay, Negrito, and Senoi people of the Malay Peninsula. It is commonly made from long leaves such as from various palm trees, and then woven to form a pattern and shape into a ring that can be worn on one's head. There are also tempoks made of tree barks and other natural materials.

It is usually paired with other traditional clothings such as a tree bark shirt, a leaf sash, and other things that form part of their traditional attire.

== Terminology ==
The word 'tempok' (te̞mpʊʔ) originates from the Senoic languages such as Semai and Temiar, same goes to the word 'boh hor'. Whereas the Negrito people initially used 'sajak' and 'ta jug', although there are no traces of its etymology. Proto-Malays such as the Jakun tribe initially used 'putaran' or 'tanjak' which can also be found in the Malay dictionary.

Nowadays, most of the indigenous people in Malaysia uses the word tempok to refer to all the different types of traditional headgears made of natural materials of the indigenous tribes in the Malay Peninsula.

In English, most sources use the direct loanword 'tempok', but some sources use 'tempo' instead.

== Forms ==
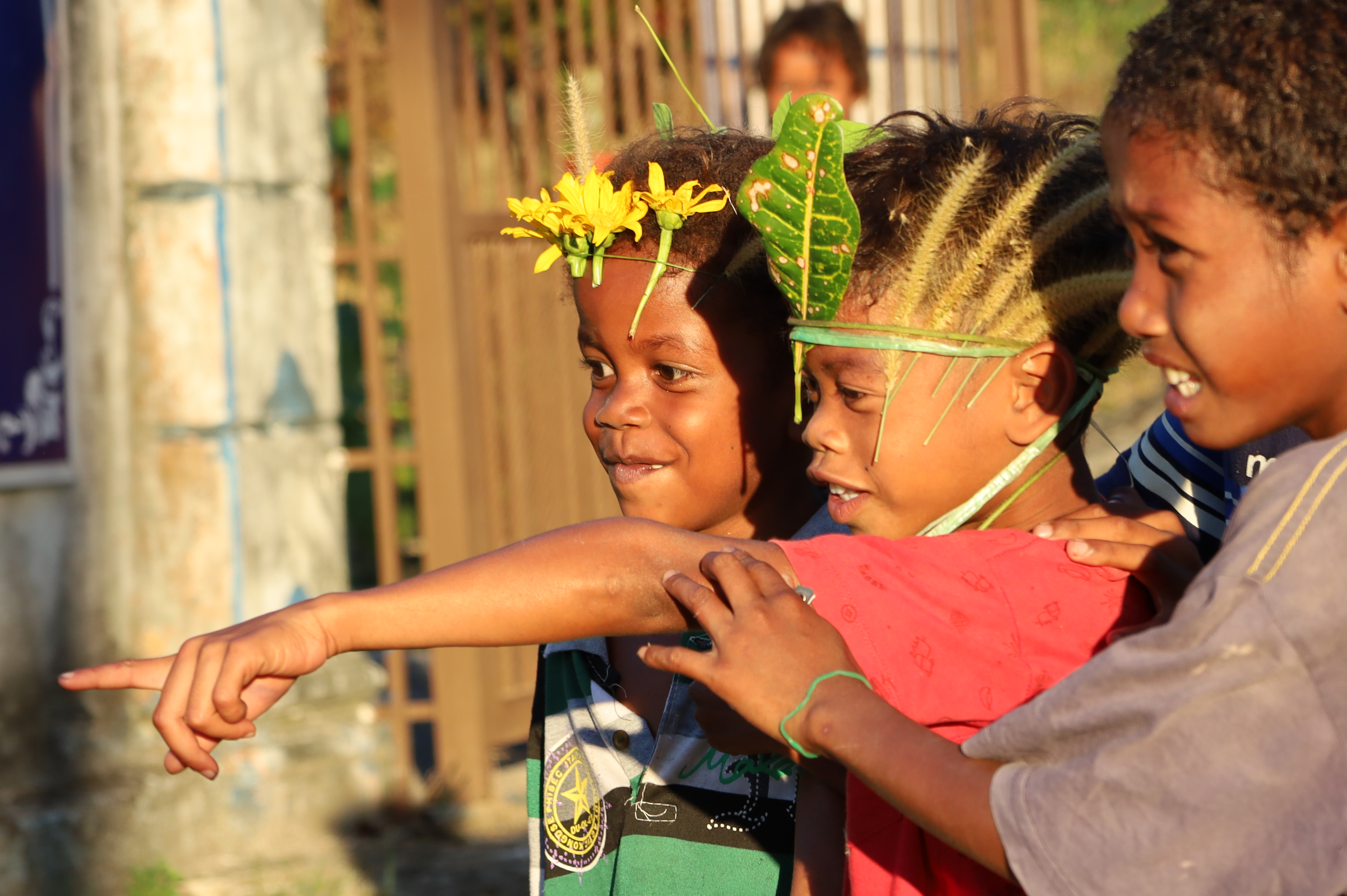
A daun lalang style tempok made by Kensiu children while playing pretend.

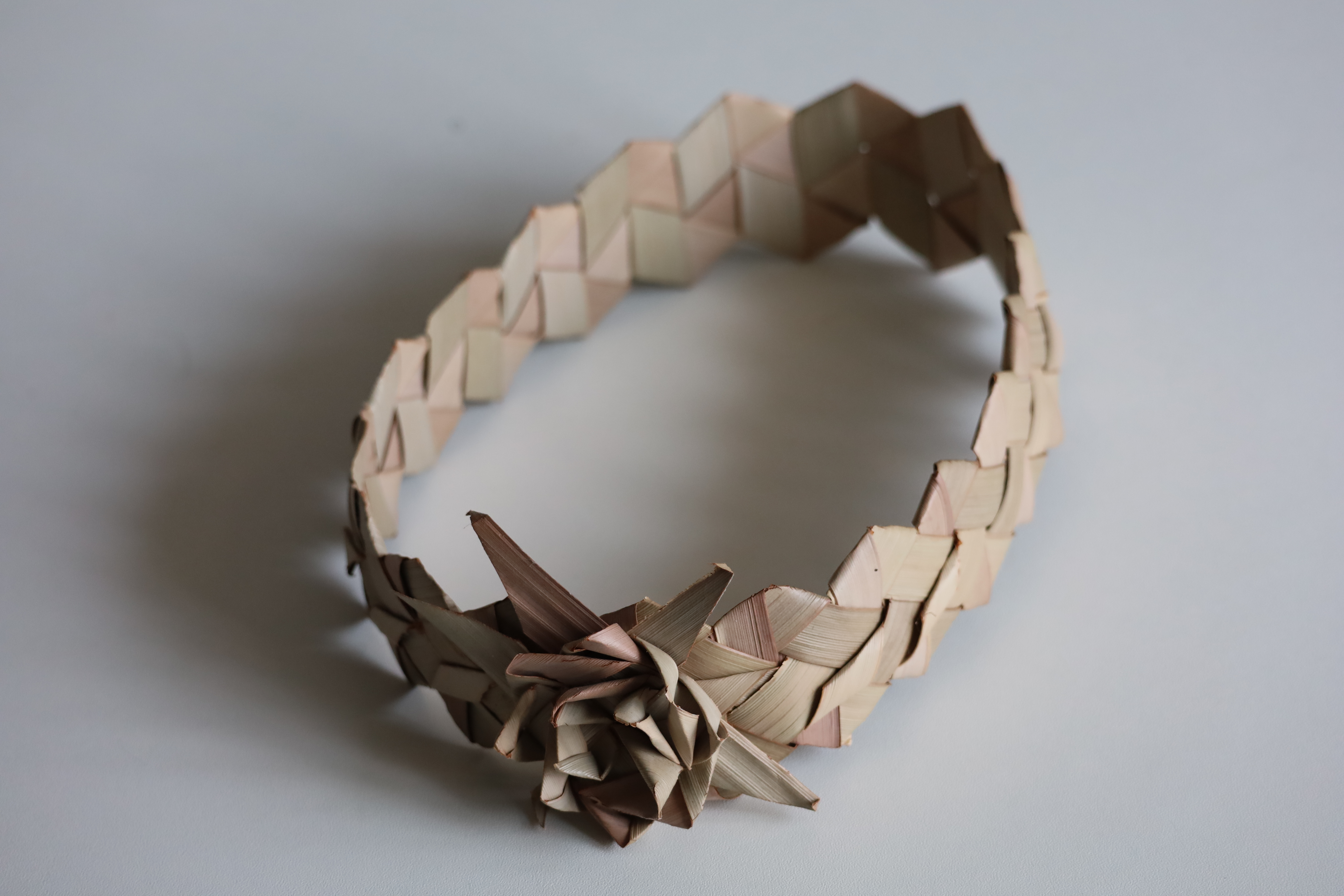
A daun nipah style tempok from the Mah Meri tribe.

There are multiple variants of tempok based on the way they are made and the materials they are made of:

- Daun tembakau (lit. tobacco leaf) is made from thin leaves such as from salak plants, woven finely to form intricate textures using the colour or shade of the leaves, worn by the Senoi people.
- Daun lalang (lit. weed leaf) is made from thin underbrush and tied around the head, used by the Senoi and Negrito people.
- Daun nipah (lit. nipa leaf) is made from long wide palm leaves, woven into patterns around the head, commonly with a floral design at the front, word by the Temuan and Mah Meri people.
- Daun kelapa (lit. coconut leaf) or kaki lipan (lit. centipede legs) is similar to daun nipah, but has parts of the leaves pointing upwards all around and without a floral design, and is found common across all indigenous tribes in the peninsula.
- Kulit kayu terap (lit. artocarpus bark) is made from tree barks which have been softened to be akin to a soft cloth, used by the Proto-Malays.
- Daun mengkuang is made from palm leaves folded into multiple shapes and patterns to cover the head, used by the Jah Hut people.

Leaf-based tempoks are used both when the leaves are fresh and when they are dry. Most daun nipah and daun kelapa tempoks are made when they are still fresh and green to ease the folding and weaving process.

== Culture ==
Tempoks play a big role in Malaysian indigenous culture. Originally, it is often worn by village chieftains and shamans during ceremonies such as weddings and sewang (traditional mass healing ceremony). However, it would later find its way to be used by the common people to resemble their diverse traditional culture and connectedness to nature. Some indigenous tribes such as Jakun believes that the tempok is embodied with a spirit that guards them and their people.

It is a common symbol of pride and unity among the indigenous tribes in the Malay Peninsula. Cameron Highlands Member of Parliament, Ramli Mohd Nor who was the first non-Malay indigenous member and Deputy Speaker of the Malaysian Parliament from the Malay Peninsula, marked history when he swore in at the Parliament wearing a daun tembakau tempok along with the national formal wear, baju Melayu, and began his speech in Senoi after winning a by-election in 2019.

The tempok is also commonly showcased as an important part of the Malaysian culture during international events. It is also marketed and sold to the public as part of the indigenous entrepreneurship.
