= Sivarraajh Chandran =

Malaysian politician

Yang Berhormat Senator Dato' Sivarraajh Chandran DIMP
- சிவராஜ் சந்திரன்

Senator Appointed by the Yang di-Pertuan Agong
- Incumbent
- Assumed office 20 March 2023
- Monarchs: Abdullah (2023–2024); Ibrahim (since 2024)
- Prime Minister: Anwar Ibrahim

Member of the Malaysian Parliament for Cameron Highlands
- In office 9 May 2018 – 30 November 2018
- Preceded by: Palanivel Govindasamy (BN–MIC)
- Succeeded by: Ramli Mohd Nor (BN)
- Majority: 597 (2018)

Youth Chief of the Malaysian Indian Congress
- In office 17 November 2013 – 21 October 2018
- President: Subramaniam Sathasivam
- Preceded by: Mohan Thangarasu
- Succeeded by: Thinalan T Rajagopalu

Faction represented in the Dewan Negara
- 2023, 2024–: Barisan Nasional
- 2023–2024: Independent

Faction represented in the Dewan Rakyat
- 2018: Barisan Nasional

Personal details
- Born: Sivarraajh s/o Chandran; 16 September 1976 (age 50) Lumut, Perak, Malaysia
- Citizenship: Malaysian
- Party: Malaysian Indian Congress (MIC) (until 2023, since 2024); Independent (2023–2024)
- Other political affiliations: Barisan Nasional (BN) (until 2023, since 2024)
- Education: University of Malaya, Universiti Sains Malaysia
- Occupation: Politician

Sivarraajh s/o Chandran (Tamil: சி. சிவராஜ், romanized: Ci. Civarāj; born 16 September 1976) is a Malaysian politician who has served as a Senator since March 2023. He served as the Member of Parliament (MP) for Cameron Highlands from May to November 2018. He is a member of the Malaysian Indian Congress (MIC), a component party of the Barisan Nasional (BN) coalition and briefly was an independent politician from June 2023 until September 2024. He was the Vice President of MIC and served as the Youth Chief of MIC from November 2013 to October 2018 as well as Division Chief of MIC of Taman Bukit Kuchai Baru prior to his resignation from the party in June 2023.

== Education and personal life ==
Born on 16 September 1976 in Lumut, Perak and later spent his schooling years in Sekolah Menengah Anderson, Ipoh, Perak. Sivaraajh graduated with a Bachelor's (Hons) in Economics from the University of Malaya. His father Chandran Nagalingam was a general worker in Telekom Malaysia (TM) while his mother Chandra Kaniappan a housewife. He has two siblings named Sri Ganesh and Khayathry. Sivarrajh is married to Malathi Annamalai from Segamat, Johor and the couple has three children named Vassanthraaj, Sivashni and Tivhashinee. They were dating while both were studying at Universiti Malaya.

== Political career ==
Sivarraajh political involvement begun in 2004 as member of MIC. He was later appointed as MIC Youth Secretary from 2008 to 2013.

In the 2013 general election, Sivarraajh was fielded as a candidate for the Buntong state assembly seat in Perak, but lost to a DAP candidate Sivasubramaniam A/L Athinarayanan.

Following, he was appointed as Youth Chief of the MIC and Vice-Chief of BN Youth Wing from 2013 to 2018. In 2011, he became a member of the advisory panel of the Special Affairs Department (JASA), which was the previous Malaysian BN government's propaganda unit, helping the Director-General of the organisation in formulating political strategies, especially those pertaining to Malaysian Indians and then appointed as a special officer to the former Perak Menteri Besar.

In early 2017, Sivarraajh was appointed as BN's Cameron Highlands Parliamentary Constituency Coordinator. Functional through a locally set up Parliamentary Community Service Centre (Pusat Khidmat Masyarakat Parlimen), Tanah Rata, Cameron Highlands, its role includes to map needs of the community within the constituency for strategic resource allocation.

Sivarraajh contested and won the 2018 general election to become Member of Parliament for Cameron Highlands parliamentary seat in Pahang. But his victory was nullified by the Election Court as he was found guilty of bribing the Orang Asli voters.

On 27 June 2023, Sivarrajh announced his resignation as Taman Bukit Kuchai Baru MIC Division Chief and from MIC with immediate effect. He revealed that few incidents, restrictions to discharge the duties as a Senator, certain members who demonised him and fears of division among MIC party members led him to the resignation.

On 6 September 2024, he officially rejoins MIC as an ordinary member.

=== MIC Youth Disaster Aid Centre (MYDAC) ===
In 2014, as the Chief of MIC Youth Wing Sivarraajh established MIC Youth Disaster Aid Centre (MYDAC) to enable organised assistance delivered during natural disasters to victims.

=== Malaysian Indian Youth Consultative Council (MIYCC) ===
In 2014, he founded the Malaysian Indian Youth Consultative Council (MIYCC), which aims to foster entrepreneurship and economic skills among Indian youths, and currently serves as its advisor. The council is held by esteemed icons of the Indian society in Malaysia such as Datuk Dr. Jeyaindran (Deputy Director General, Ministry of Health), Dato' Param (Former DCP, PDRM), Datuk Bhupat Rai (Board of Directors, International Bank India), En. Ravindran Devagunam (Director, PEMANDU), Professor Sivamurugan Pandian (USM), Dato’ CM Vignaesvaran (Chief Executive, PSMB), and five other individuals. Further, he also launched Action Plan for Malaysian Indian Youth under MIYCC in October 2016 inline with the initiatives takes by the Malaysian Prime Minister to draft plan for the Malaysian Indian Bluerprint.

== Controversy ==
On 30 November 2018, the Kuala Lumpur High Court, sitting as an election court, has nullified Sivarraajh's 2018 general election victory in Cameron Highlands, for the offence of vote-buying and corrupt practices committed to induce voters. DAP candidate M. Manogaran's election petition, had proven beyond reasonable doubt that money was given to voters during the campaign period.

The Orang Asli leaders (Tok Batins) testified that BN candidates for the Cameron Highlands parliamentary and Jelai state seats gave a total of RM2,100 to six Tok Batins, in seeking their support few days before polling day. The Tok Batins also said they were given RM200 as “duit rokok” (cigarette money) during the 12-day campaign period. However, Sivarraajh denied the claims of vote buying, insisting that it was wrong under the law. Malaysian Anti-Corruption Commission (MACC) also investigate into several corruption charges during his stint at Cameron Highlands.

As Sivarraajh and MIC did not appeal for the court's decision; the seat was declared vacant and has set for the 2019 Cameron Highlands by-election on 26 January by Election Commission (EC). He was ineligible to re-contest the by-election as he was banned from becoming a candidate or voter in any election for the next five years. The High Court on 10 January 2019 dismissed Sivarraajh's bid to challenge EC decision over the five-year election ban.

== Election results ==
Perak State Legislative Assembly
Year	Constituency	Candidate	Votes	Pct	Opponent(s)	Votes	Pct	Ballots cast	Majority	Turnout
2013	N30 Buntong	Sivarraajh Chandran (MIC)	4,433	24.79%	Sivasubramaniam Athinarayanan (DAP)	13,062	71.79%	18,195	8,629	79.64%
2013	N30 Buntong	Sivarraajh Chandran (MIC)	4,433	24.79%	Iruthiyam Sebastiar Anthonisamy (IND)	261	1.46%	18,195	8,629	79.64%
2013	N30 Buntong	Sivarraajh Chandran (MIC)	4,433	24.79%	Mohd Basri Shafie (IND)	127	0.71%	18,195	8,629	79.64%

Parliament of Malaysia
Year	Constituency	Candidate	Votes	Pct	Opponent(s)	Votes	Pct	Ballots cast	Majority	Turnout
2018	P078 Cameron Highlands	Sivarraajh Chandran (MIC) (Note: The Election Court has on 30 November 2018, nullified Sivarraajh's election for the element of corrupted practices which had triggered the 2019 Cameron Highlands by-election.)	10,307	42.30%	Manogaran Marimuthu (DAP)	9,710	39.85%	24,365	597	76.03%
2018	P078 Cameron Highlands	Sivarraajh Chandran (MIC)	10,307	42.30%	Wan Mahadir Wan Mahmud (PAS)	3,587	14.72%	24,365	597	76.03%
2018	P078 Cameron Highlands	Sivarraajh Chandran (MIC)	10,307	42.30%	Suresh Kumar Balasubramaniam (PSM)	680	2.79%	24,365	597	76.03%
2018	P078 Cameron Highlands	Sivarraajh Chandran (MIC)	10,307	42.30%	Mohd Tahir Kassim (BERJASA)	81	0.33%	24,365	597	76.03%
2022	P017 Padang Serai	Sivarraajh Chandran (MIC) (Note: Withdrew after the Nomination Day in favor of PH candidate.)	2,983	3.26%	Azman Nasrudin (BERSATU)	51,637	56.49%	91,416	16,260	68.95%
2022	P017 Padang Serai	Sivarraajh Chandran (MIC)	2,983	3.26%	Mohamad Sofee Razak (PKR)	35,377	38.70%	91,416	16,260	68.95%
2022	P017 Padang Serai	Sivarraajh Chandran (MIC)	2,983	3.26%	Sreanandha Rao (IND)	846	0.93%	91,416	16,260	68.95%
2022	P017 Padang Serai	Sivarraajh Chandran (MIC)	2,983	3.26%	Hamzah Abd Rahman (PEJUANG)	424	0.46%	91,416	16,260	68.95%
2022	P017 Padang Serai	Sivarraajh Chandran (MIC)	2,983	3.26%	Mohd Bakhri Hashim (WARISAN) (Note: Withdrew after the Nomination Day.)	149	0.16%	91,416	16,260	68.95%

== Honours ==
- Malaysia
  - Recipient of the 17th Yang di-Pertuan Agong Installation Medal
- Pahang
  - Knight Companion of Order of the Crown of Pahang (DIMP) – Dato' (2016)
