= Ramli Mohd Nor =

Malaysian politician and former police officer

Yang Berhormat Dato' Sri Ramli Mohd Nor SSAP PSPP DIMP PPP KMN AMN PPT PPA MP
- رملي محمد نور

Deputy Speaker of the Dewan Rakyat I
- Incumbent
- Assumed office 19 December 2022 Serving with Alice Lau Kiong Yieng
- Monarchs: Abdullah (2022–2024); Ibrahim Iskandar (since 2024)
- Prime Minister: Anwar Ibrahim
- Speaker: Johari Abdul
- Preceded by: Mohd Rashid Hasnon
- Constituency: Cameron Highlands

Non-Executive Chairman of the Amanah Raya Berhad
- Incumbent
- Assumed office 15 May 2020

Member of the Malaysian Parliament for Cameron Highlands
- Incumbent
- Assumed office 26 January 2019
- Preceded by: Sivarraajh Chandran (BN–MIC)
- Majority: 3,238 (2019); 4,544 (2022)

Faction represented in the Dewan Rakyat
- 2019–: Barisan Nasional

Personal details
- Born: Ramli bin Mohd Nor; 1 October 1958 (age 67) Gombak, Selangor, Federation of Malaya (now Malaysia)
- Citizenship: Malaysian
- Party: Independent (–2019); United Malays National Organisation (UMNO) (since 2019)
- Other political affiliations: Barisan Nasional (BN)
- Occupation: Politician, police officer
- Police career
- Country: Malaysia
- Department: Royal Malaysia Police
- Service years: 1984 – 2018
- Rank: Assistant Commissioner of Police
- Badge no.: G/10460
- Awards: Loyal Commander of The Most Gallant Police Order
- Ramli Mohd Nor on Parliament of Malaysia

Ramli bin Mohd Nor (Jawi: رملي بن محمد نور; born 1 October 1958) is a Malaysian politician and former police officer who has served as the Deputy Speaker of the Dewan Rakyat I under Speaker Johari Abdul since December 2022 and the Member of Parliament (MP) for Cameron Highlands since January 2019 and Non-Executive Chairman of Amanah Raya Berhad (ARB) since May 2020. He is a member of United Malays National Organisation (UMNO), a component party of the Barisan Nasional (BN) coalition and was an independent.

== Early life and education ==
Ramli was born at Batu 12 Orang Asli Settlement, Jalan Pahang, Gombak, Selangor in 1958. Ramli's father was a native of Peninsular Malaysia known as the Orang Asli from the Semai tribe hailing from Cameron Highlands, Pahang whilst his mother is from the Temiar tribe and hailed from Gua Musang, Kelantan.

He received his Certificate in Criminal Justice Education from University of Virginia, Diploma in Public Administration from Universiti Teknologi MARA, Diploma in Police Science from Universiti Kebangsaan Malaysia, Bachelor of Arts in Business Studies (Hons) from University of East London, as well as Federal Bureau of Investigation (FBI) National Academy Graduate 244th Session, Quantico, Virginia US. He holds a master’s degree in public administration with distinction from Open University Malaysia and a master's degree in business administration from The University of the West of Scotland (UWS), Scotland, UK. He recently earned his Doctorate in Business Administration (DrBA) from SEGi University, Malaysia.

== Early career ==
Ramli's career in public service spanned 38 years beginning in 1980 when Ramli served as port traffic officer at Johor Port Authority.

He joined the police force in 1984 and served for 34 years before become a retired senior police officer in Royal Malaysia Police (RMP) with the rank of Assistant Commissioner of Police (ACP).

== Political career ==
On 26 January 2019, Ramli firstly contested in Cameron Highlands by-election and he was picked as candidate given that he was the direct member of BN. He went on to win the by-election and became the new Cameron Highlands MP. The election was held after the Election Court on 30 November 2018 declared the victory of the incumbent MP of BN and the Malaysian Indian Congress (MIC), Sivarraajh Chandran for the seat in the election null and void because it was found that corrupt practices had been committed in the 2018 general election (GE14).

He won the by-election after defeating M. Manogaran of Democratic Action Party (DAP) from Pakatan Harapan (PH) and two other independent candidates, Wong Seng Yee and Sallehudin Ab Talib, with a majority of 3,238 votes.

He is the first ever indigenous Orang Asli candidate to be elected into the Dewan Rakyat as an MP, and marked history when he swore in at the Parliament wearing a tempok and beginning his speech in the Semai language.

On 15 May 2020, he was appointed as Non-Executive Chairman of Amanah Raya Berhad (ARB).

On 1 March 2022, he was tasked to chair the Dewan Rakyat sitting as temporary Deputy Speaker of the Dewan Rakyat II replacing Azalina Othman Said and created history as the first ever Orang Asli deputy speaker although not being officially appointed to the position yet. He is however widely expected to be officially appointed in the next Dewan Rakyat meeting after multiple postponements of the appointment on 14 September 2021 for the first time, 25 October 2021 for the second time, 1 March 2022 for the third time, 18 July 2022 for the fourth time and 3 October 2022 for the fifth time as well as his expected win in the contest for the position between him and former deputy speaker Nga Kor Ming who is trying to make a comeback to the position. However on 3 October 2022 when Minister in the Prime Minister's Department in charge of Parliament and Law Wan Junaidi unveiled the fifth postponement of the appointment of the deputy speaker position, he also revealed that the Pakatan Harapan (PH) opposition coalition did not nominate another candidate, in contrast with the previous news and hence the government was withdrawing its candidate. Although he was yet to be officially appointed as deputy speaker, the media has already referred him as the deputy speaker, suggesting falsely that he had been officially appointed to the position during the period of these multiple postponements.

== Election results ==
Parliament of Malaysia
Year	Constituency	Candidate	Votes	Pct	Opponent(s)	Votes	Pct	Ballots cast	Majority	Turnout
2019	P078 Cameron Highlands	Ramli Mohd Nor (BN)	12,038	56.18%	Manogaran Marimuthu (DAP)	8,800	41.07%	22,019	3,238	68.79%
2019	P078 Cameron Highlands	Ramli Mohd Nor (BN)	12,038	56.18%	Sallehudin Ab Talib (IND)	314	1.47%	22,019	3,238	68.79%
2019	P078 Cameron Highlands	Ramli Mohd Nor (BN)	12,038	56.18%	Wong Seng Yee (IND)	276	1.29%	22,019	3,238	68.79%
2022	P078 Cameron Highlands	Ramli Mohd Nor (UMNO)	16,120	48.46%	Chiong Yoke Kong (DAP)	11,576	34.80%	33,265	4,544	72.28%
2022	P078 Cameron Highlands	Ramli Mohd Nor (UMNO)	16,120	48.46%	Abdul Rasid Mohamed Ali (BERSATU)	5,569	16.74%	33,265	4,544	72.28%

== Honours ==
=== Honours of Malaysia ===
- Malaysia
  - Officer of the Order of the Defender of the Realm (KMN) (2016)
  - Member of the Order of the Defender of the Realm (AMN) (2007)
  - Recipient of the General Service Medal (PPA)
  - Recipient of the 17th Yang di-Pertuan Agong Installation Medal
- Royal Malaysia Police
  - Loyal Commander of the Most Gallant Police Order (PSPP) (2017)
  - Warrior of the Most Gallant Police Order (PPP) (2005)
  - Recipient of the Presentation of Police Colours Medal
- Negeri Sembilan
  - Recipient of the Distinguished Service Medal (PPT) (2008)
  - Recipient of the Tuanku Muhriz Installation Medal (2009)
- Pahang
  - Knight Grand Companion of the Order of Sultan Ahmad Shah of Pahang (SSAP) – Dato' Sri (2026)
  - Knight Companion of the Order of the Crown of Pahang (DIMP) – Dato' (2021)
