= Kota Tampan (state constituency) =

Political subdivision in Malaysia

Kota Tampan (N04)
Perak constituency

State constituency
- Legislature: Perak State Legislative Assembly
MLA
Saarani Mohamad
BN
- Constituency created: 2003
- First contested: 2004
- Last contested: 2022

Demographics
- Electors (2022): 15,354

Kota Tampan is a state constituency in Perak, Malaysia, that has been represented in the Perak State Legislative Assembly.

== Demographics ==
Ethnic breakdown of Kota Tampan's electorate as of 2022
1. Malay (82.7%)
2. Chinese (14.5%)
3. Indian (2.42%)
4. Other ethnicities (0.42%)

== History ==
=== Polling districts ===
According to the federal gazette issued on 30 March 2018, the Kota Tampan constituency is divided into 15 polling districts.

| State constituency | Polling Districts | Code | Location |
|---|---|---|---|
| Kota Tampan (N04) | Kampong Gelok | 055/04/01 | SK Gelok |
| Kota Tampan (N04) | Kampong Lenggong | 055/04/02 | SK Lenggong |
| Kota Tampan (N04) | Kampong Sira | 055/04/03 | SK Bukit Balai |
| Kota Tampan (N04) | Bukit Raja | 055/04/04 | SJK (C) Yeong Hwa |
| Kota Tampan (N04) | Bukit Balai | 055/04/05 | SMK Dato Ahmad |
| Kota Tampan (N04) | Kampong Telok Batu | 055/04/06 | SK Lenggong |
| Kota Tampan (N04) | Kampong Temelong | 055/04/07 | SK Temelong |
| Kota Tampan (N04) | Kampong Chepor | 055/40/08 | SK Chepor |
| Kota Tampan (N04) | Kampong Luat | 055/44/09 | SK Luat |
| Kota Tampan (N04) | Banggol Belimbing | 055/04/10 | SK Banggol Belimbing |
| Kota Tampan (N04) | Kota Tampan | 055/04/11 | SJK (C) Kota Tampan |
| Kota Tampan (N04) | Lubok Kawah | 055/04/12 | SK Lubok Kawah |
| Kota Tampan (N04) | Kampong Raban | 055/04/13 | SMK Sultan Azlan Shah |
| Kota Tampan (N04) | Kuak | 055/04/14 | SK Raban |
| Kota Tampan (N04) | Kampong Rabab | 055/04/15 | SK Beng |

=== Representation history ===
Members of the Legislative Assembly for Kota Tampan
| Assembly | No | Years | Member | Party |
Constituency created from Lenggong and Kenering
| 11th | N04 | 2004-2008 | Saarani Mohamad | BN (UMNO) |
| 12th | N04 | 2008-2013 | Saarani Mohamad | BN (UMNO) |
| 13th | N04 | 2013-2018 | Saarani Mohamad | BN (UMNO) |
| 14th | N04 | 2018–2022 | Saarani Mohamad | BN (UMNO) |
| 15th | N04 | 2022–present | Saarani Mohamad | BN (UMNO) |

== Election results ==
Perak state election, 2022
| Party | Candidate | Votes | % | ∆% |
|---|---|---|---|---|
| BN | Saarani Mohamad | 5,468 | 48.24 | ▼3.09 |
| PN | Mohd Jamil Yahya | 4,231 | 37.32 | ▲37.32 |
| PH | Mohd Sabri Abdul Manaf | 1,637 | 14.44 | ▲14.44 |
| Total valid votes | | 11,336 | 100.00 | |
| Total rejected ballots | | 158 | | |
| Unreturned ballots | | 22 | | |
| Turnout | | 11,516 | 75.01 | ▼3.95 |
| Registered electors | | 15,354 | | |
| Majority | | 1,237 | 10.92 | ▼11.88 |
| BN hold | | Swing | | |

Perak state election, 2018
| Party | Candidate | Votes | % | ∆% |
|---|---|---|---|---|
| BN | Saarani Mohamad | 5,183 | 51.33 | ▼6.79 |
| PAS | Muhammad Rif'aat Razman | 2,881 | 28.53 | ▲28.53 |
| PKR | Noor Hasnida Mohd. Hashim | 1,834 | 18.16 | ▼23.72 |
| Total valid votes | | 9,898 | 98.03 | |
| Total rejected ballots | | 150 | 1.49 | |
| Unreturned ballots | | 49 | 0.49 | |
| Turnout | | 10,097 | 78.96 | ▼4.74 |
| Registered electors | | 12,787 | | |
| Majority | | 2,302 | 22.80 | ▲6.54 |
| BN hold | | Swing | | |
Source(s) "RESULTS OF CONTESTED ELECTION AND STATEMENTS OF THE POLL AFTER THE OFFICIAL ADDITION OF VOTES".

Perak state election, 2013
| Party | Candidate | Votes | % | ∆% |
|---|---|---|---|---|
| BN | Saarani Mohamad | 5,893 | 58.12 | ▼5.83 |
| PKR | Zahrul Nizam Abdul Majid | 4,049 | 41.88 | ▲6.07 |
| Total valid votes | | 9,942 | 98.06 | |
| Total rejected ballots | | 159 | 1.57 | |
| Unreturned ballots | | 38 | 0.37 | |
| Turnout | | 10,139 | 83.70 | ▲10.58 |
| Registered electors | | 12,120 | | |
| Majority | | 1,844 | 16.24 | ▼13.85 |
| BN hold | | Swing | | |
Source(s) "KEPUTUSAN PILIHAN RAYA UMUM DEWAN UNDANGAN NEGERI". Archived from the original on 2013-06-07.

Perak state election, 2008
| Party | Candidate | Votes | % | ∆% |
|---|---|---|---|---|
| BN | Saarani Mohamad | 4,963 | 63.95 | ▼3.98 |
| PKR | Hamzah Mohd Zain | 2,628 | 36.05 | ▲3.98 |
| Total valid votes | | 7,591 | 97.81 | |
| Total rejected ballots | | 141 | 1.82 | |
| Unreturned ballots | | 29 | 0.37 | |
| Turnout | | 7,761 | 73.12 | ▲3.81 |
| Registered electors | | 10,614 | | |
| Majority | | 2,335 | 30.09 | ▼5.09 |
| BN hold | | Swing | | |
Source(s) "KEPUTUSAN PILIHAN RAYA UMUM DEWAN UNDANGAN NEGERI PERAK BAGI TAHUN 2008".

Perak state election, 2004
| Party | Candidate | Votes | % |
|---|---|---|---|
| BN | Saarani Mohamad | 5,071 | 67.93 |
| PKR | Hamzah Mohd Zain | 2,394 | 32.07 |
| Total valid votes | | 7,465 | 98.12 |
| Total rejected ballots | | 134 | 1.76 |
| Unreturned ballots | | 9 | 0.12 |
| Turnout | | 7,608 | 69.31 |
| Registered electors | | 10,976 | |
| Majority | | 2,677 | 35.18 |
This was a new constituency created.
Source(s) "KEPUTUSAN PILIHAN RAYA UMUM DEWAN UNDANGAN NEGERI PERAK BAGI TAHUN 2004".
