= Palanivel Govindasamy =

Malaysian politician (1949–2025)

Yang Berbahagia Datuk Seri Palanivel Govindasamy SMW DSSA SSA
- பழனிவேல் கோவிந்தசாமி

8th President of the Malaysian Indian Congress (MIC)
- In office 6 December 2010 – 23 June 2013
- Deputy: Subramaniam Sathasivam
- Preceded by: Samy Vellu
- Succeeded by: Subramaniam Sathasivam

Ministerial roles
- 1995–1999: Parliamentary Secretary of National Unity and Community Development
- 1999–2004: Deputy Minister of Rural Development
- 2004–2009: Deputy Minister of Women, Family and Community Development
- 2009–2011: Deputy Minister of Plantation Industries and Commodities
- 2011–2013: Minister in the Prime Minister's Department
- 2013–2015: Minister of Natural Resources and Environment

Faction represented in Dewan Rakyat
- 1990–2008: Barisan Nasional
- 2013–2018: Barisan Nasional

Faction represented in Dewan Negara
- 2010–2013: Barisan Nasional

Personal details
- Born: Palanivel s/o K. Govindasamy; 1 March 1949 Penang, Federation of Malaya (now Malaysia)
- Died: 17 June 2025 (aged 76) Kuala Lumpur, Malaysia
- Citizenship: Malaysian
- Party: Malaysian Indian Congress (MIC) (1968–2014); Independent (2014–2025)
- Spouse: Kanagam Palanivel
- Children: 4 sons
- Education: University of Malaya (Bachelor of Arts)
- Occupation: Politician
- Website: www.gpalanivel.com.my

Palanivel s/o K. Govindasamy (Tamil: பழனிவேல் கோவிந்தசாமி, romanized: Paḻaṉivēl Kōvintacāmi; 1 March 1949 – 17 June 2025), commonly known as G. Palanivel, was a Malaysian politician who served as Minister of Natural Resources and Environment from May 2013 to July 2015, Minister in the Prime Minister's Department from August 2011 to May 2013, Deputy Minister of Plantation Industries and Commodities, Deputy Minister of Rural Development, Deputy Minister of Welfare and Family Development, Senator from May 2010 to May 2013, Member of Parliament (MP) for Cameron Highlands from May 2013 to May 2018 and Hulu Selangor from October 1990 to March 2008. He was a member and served as the 8th President of the Malaysian Indian Congress (MIC), a component party of the ruling Barisan Nasional (BN) coalition, from December 2010 to June 2013.

== Background ==
Palanivel was born in Penang on 1 March 1949. He obtained a Bachelor of Arts from University of Malaya in 1972, majoring in History. Initially he became a teacher at the Goon Institute in Kuala Lumpur and then at Maktab Adabi in Kuantan. In the same year as his graduation, he was elected Secretary of Petaling Branch of Malaysian Indian Congress (MIC), a political party which is part of the ruling coalition. He was with the party from 1968 onwards.

He moved on to become a research assistant at the Muzium Negara (National Museum). In 1974, he went back to Penang to join the Consumer Association of Penang. There he rose to the position of executive director. His next career move was to join Bernama as a journalist in 1977. There he was elevated to become the economic news editor. It was during this period he was invited to become a press secretary to the Minister of Works who was (and is) also the President of MIC. That set the stage for the crucial take-off in his political career. He was chosen as a candidate in the country's general elections in 1990 and won every single election as a member of parliament ever afterwards until his loss in the 8 March 2008 elections when a tidal wave of voter sentiment against the ruling coalition came to the fore that resulted in the loss of four states out of thirteen to the opposition and in the loss of two-thirds majority in the Parliament.

Positions in the government commenced with Palanivel being appointed the parliamentary secretary to the Ministry of National Unity. He rose further to become the deputy minister of Rural Development of Malaysia from 1999 until 2004 when he was made the deputy minister of Welfare and Family Development. He continued as the deputy minister until his defeat in the March 2008 general elections.

Palanivel also had a stint in the corporate circle as a business adviser to Sports Toto and as one of the members of the board of directors of Telekom Malaysia.

Palanivel married Kanagam Palanivel and the couple had four sons.

== Political career ==
In June 2006, Palanivel, previously a vice-president of MIC, entered a new era of top level MIC leadership by defeating a 27-year incumbent, Dato' Subramaniam Sinniah, to become the new deputy president of MIC. He retained his position in the MIC elections concluded on 12 September 2009. Palanivel was appointed MIC president to replace Samy Vellu on 6 December 2010.

Palanivel's position hitherto had been a Deputy Minister of Rural Development from 1999 until March 2008 when he failed to secure his parliamentary seat in the 2008 elections, appointed by Prime Minister Mahathir Mohamad. Following the crushing defeat of MIC representatives in the 2008 general elections, MIC's top leadership was conspicuously absent in the cabinet of the ruling coalition, Barisan Nasional that is made up of largely race-based parties dominated by the Malay-based UMNO. It is the more junior members of MIC leadership who won in the General Elections who hold one ministerial and two deputy-ministerial posts allocated for the party. Moreover, in the April 2009 new government line-up, MIC's representation was reduced.

Although the Barisan Nasional coalition won the 2008 general elections, it lost its previous eminent position of securing parliamentary seats exceeding two-thirds majority. In the same elections, serious gains including capturing five states out of the total of thirteen have been made by the alternative coalition, Pakatan Rakyat.

On 3 May 2010, Palanivel was appointed a Senator in the Dewan Negara.

Palanivel returned to the federal cabinet portfolio and was appointed Deputy Minister of Plantation Industries and Commodities after a minor Cabinet reshuffle on 4 June 2010.

On 6 December 2010, Palanivel was appointed the 8th MIC President succeeding Samy Vellu who had held the post for 31 years.

On 5 May 2013, Palanivel won the Cameron Highlands Parliament seat in the 13th Malaysian General Election. The Malaysian Indian Congress won 4 (Cameron Highlands, Segamat, Hulu Selangor, Tapah) Parliament seats in total and 5 (Gambir, Kahang, Tenggaroh, Gadek, Jeram Padang) State seats, an extra seat compared to the previous election in Malaysia. He was then appointed Minister of Natural Resources and Environment.

On 3 July 2013, Palanivel said that MIC was against the controversial bill which allows unilateral conversion of a child below 18 years old to Islam.

On 5 July 2013, Palanivel commented "It was a fair move taking into consideration the sensitivities of various stakeholders and groups. MIC still stands by its statement that the consent of both parents are needed for the conversion of children to Islam," after the controversial bill on conversion of minors was withdrawn by the Malaysian ruling government Barisan Nasional.

== Death ==
On 17 June 2025, Palanivel died at the age of 76.

== Election results ==
Parliament of Malaysia
Year	Constituency	Candidate	Votes	Pct	Opponent(s)	Votes	Pct	Ballots cast	Majority	Turnout
1990	P084 Hulu Selangor	Palanivel Govindasamy (MIC)	20,839	63.74%	Nazar Yakin (S46)	11,857	36.26%	34,590	8,982	73.70%
1995	P088 Hulu Selangor	Palanivel Govindasamy (MIC)	26,829	80.15%	Adnan Din (S46)	5,414	16.17%	35,223	21,415	68.72%
1995	P088 Hulu Selangor	Palanivel Govindasamy (MIC)	26,829	80.15%	Peng Kim Sing (DAP)	1,231	3.68%	35,223	21,415	68.72%
1999	P088 Hulu Selangor	Palanivel Govindasamy (MIC)	22,143	61.65%	Halili Rahmat (PKR)	13,548	37.72%	37,195	8,595	71.06%
2004	P094 Hulu Selangor	Palanivel Govindasamy (MIC)	27,807	67.52%	Ismail Kamus (PAS)	13,324	32.35%	42,592	14,483	72.77%
2008	P094 Hulu Selangor	Palanivel Govindasamy (MIC)	22,979	49.55%	Zainal Abidin Ahmad (PKR)	23,177	49.97%	47,845	223	75.24%
2013	P078 Cameron Highlands	Palanivel Govindasamy (MIC)	10,506	48.03%	Manogaran Marimuthu (DAP)	10,044	45.92%	22,752	462	81.32%
2013	P078 Cameron Highlands	Palanivel Govindasamy (MIC)	10,506	48.03%	Mohd Shokri Mahmood (BERJASA)	912	4.17%	22,752	462	81.32%
2013	P078 Cameron Highlands	Palanivel Govindasamy (MIC)	10,506	48.03%	Alagu Thangarajoo (IND)	308	1.41%	22,752	462	81.32%
2013	P078 Cameron Highlands	Palanivel Govindasamy (MIC)	10,506	48.03%	Kisho Kumar Kathirveloo (IND)	101	0.46%	22,752	462	81.32%

== Honours ==
- Federal Territory (Malaysia)
  - Grand Commander of the Order of the Territorial Crown (SMW) – Datuk Seri (2012)
- Selangor
  - Knight Companion of the Order of Sultan Salahuddin Abdul Aziz Shah (DSSA) – Dato' (1996)
  - Companion of the Order of Sultan Salahuddin Abdul Aziz Shah (SSA) (1994)

Political offices
Preceded by Samy Vellu	Malaysian Indian Congress (MIC) President; 6 December 2010 – 23 June 2013	Succeeded by Subramaniam Sathasivam
