= 2019 Cameron Highlands by-election =

- 26 January 2019

P78 Cameron Highlands seat in the Dewan Rakyat
	BN	PH	IND
Candidate	Ramli Mohd Nor	M. Manogaran	Sallehudin Ab Talib
Party	Direct Member	DAP	Independent
Alliance	BN	PH
Popular vote	12,038	8,800	314
Percentage	56.18%	41.07%	1.47%
	IND
Candidate	Wong Seng Yee
Party	Independent
Popular vote	276
Percentage	1.29%
- Cameron Highlands federal constituency border and its corresponding state assembly seats.
MP before election
Sivarraajh Chandran (nullified)
Barisan Nasional (MIC)
Elected MP
Ramli Mohd Nor
Barisan Nasional (Direct Member)

A by-election was held on 26 January 2019 for the Dewan Rakyat seat of Cameron Highlands. The seat became vacant after the Election Court on 30 November 2018 declared the incumbent Barisan Nasional (BN) Member of Parliament of Malaysian Indian Congress (MIC) Dato' Sivarraajh Chandran's victory in the seat null and void because it was found that corrupt practices were committed in the 14th general election. The court found Sivarraajh guilty of bribing of between RM30 and RM1,000 to the Orang Asli community voters prior to the election as established beyond reasonable doubt in the election petition filed by the Democratic Action Party (DAP) candidate M. Manogaran.

This was the fifth national and the second parliamentary by-election to be called since the historic 2018 general election, which saw the first-ever change of federal government in Malaysia's history. Polling for this by-election was held on 26 January 2019 (Saturday), with nomination day on 12 January and early voting on 22 January. Overseas voting was opened for registration from 19 December 2018 and closed on 11 January 2019.

Barisan Nasional's direct member candidate Ramli Mohd Nor won the by-election. He was the first indigenous Orang Asli candidate elected into the Dewan Rakyat. (Ramli would later join one of the coalition's constituent parties, United Malays National Organisation (UMNO) as its member.)

The by-election had the highest turnout than any other by-election after the 14th General Elections.

== Demographics ==
Ethnic breakdown of Cameron Highlands's electorate as of 2018
Source: The Star
1. Malay (33.5%)
2. Chinese (29.5%)
3. Indian (14.9%)
4. Orang Asli (21.6%)
5. Other (0.55%)

The electoral roll used was as of the third quarter of 2018, updated on 14 December. There were a total of 32,009 registered voters, including 247 early voters and 12 absentee voters. There are also 385 disabled voters.

The constituency electorate breakdown are Malay 33.5%; Chinese 29.48%; Indian 14.91%; Orang Asli (Peninsular Malaysia) 21.56%; Bumiputera Sabah 0.12%; Bumiputera Sarawak 0.06%; Others 0.37%.

Cameron Highlands district officer Datuk Ishak Md Napis was the returning officer for the by-election. A total of 811 election officers handled the by-election in 31 polling centres, with an allocation of RM3.5 million. The nomination centre and vote-tallying centre was the Gemilang Hall of Sekolah Menengah Kebangsaan Sultan Ahmad Shah.

Vote-tallying process and results announcement of the by-election were also broadcast live to the public for a historic first time on Election Commission (EC)’s social media platforms such as Facebook and Instagram.

== Nomination ==
BN initially planned to continue to let MIC field a candidate for the by-election and the Malaysian Chinese Association (MCA) has pledges to assist MIC in Cameron Highlands by-election. But somehow BN on 10 January announced that a BN direct member who is not a member from any BN component party; Ramli Mohd Noor as the coalition's candidate in the Cameron Highlands by-election. Ramli is a retired senior police officer with the rank of Assistant Commissioner of Police (ACP); who is a local indigenous Orang Asli of Semai tribe.

Pakatan Harapan (PH) had on 4 January picked and announced DAP's M. Manogaran as the candidate for the Cameron Highlands by-election.

The Pan-Malaysian Islamic Party (PAS) had announced that they would stay out of the by-election to support opposition candidate.

The in-turmoil People's Progressive Party (MyPPP) disputed president M. Kayveas had announced on 6 January he will be contesting for the party in the by-election. But on Nomination Day, he decided not to contest and supported the PH candidate instead.

Former BN component Parti Gerakan Rakyat Malaysia (Gerakan) on 11 January announced that it has decided to sit out the Cameron Highlands parliamentary by-election after earlier rumours that the party might field its Cameron Highlands deputy division chairperson Dr Eddie Edward Tharmaraj as the candidate in the by-election.

BN's Ramli Mohd Noor, PH's M. Manogaran and two independent candidates, Wong Seng Yee and Sallehudin Ab Talib, submitted their nomination papers on 12 January to set for a four-cornered fight on 26 January. Wong (hoe logo) is a farmer and a member of the Cameron Highlands Agricultural Cooperative Association, while Sallehudin (book logo) from Felda Sungai Koyan 1, is a former lecturer at Institut Aminuddin Baki.

== Controversies and issues ==
A voter Syazleen Anisa Misria who is a bride-to-be got panic realising that the school hall she had booked six months ago for her wedding was to be used as a voting centre on the same day when the by-election was announced. She took to express her despair and sadness of her dilemma situation as almost all her wedding preparations have been done in a post on the EC's Facebook page. Her post was quickly met with an immediate attention and reply by the admin of the EC Facebook page who request her contact details to discuss the matter further. Hours later Syazleen commented to her earlier post that she had been contacted by the EC and that her wedding has been brought forward by a week. She also mentioned EC will compensate her with some contribution and her hopes that the by-election and her wedding will be smoothly conducted beside her gratitude to the EC for their assistance.

The EC ruled on 28 December that MIC C. Sivarraajh is ineligible to re-contest the by-election as he was barred from becoming a candidate or voter in any election for the next five years beginning 13 December 2018 under Section 36(2)(a) and Section 37 of the Election Offences Act 1954. The High Court on 10 January dismisses Sivarraajh's bid to challenge EC decision over the five-year election ban.

PH candidate M. Manogaran had on 10 January apologised and expressed regrets for his insensitive remarks a day earlier citing the perception that "Malays don't even buy kuih from Orang Asli vendors" analogy regarding BN fielding an Orang Asli candidate.

Orang Asli Senator Bob Manolan Mohamad of People's Justice Party (PKR) clarified that his appeal to the Orang Asli village headmen (Tok Batin) in a dialogue between them earlier, to put aside political differences and work together with the Federal Government to better their villages in Cameron Highlands have been mistaken as "threats" allegedly made to them if they did not support PH they will not get paid and will be sacked. However the explanation was vague due to clear recording obtained containing his speech during the campaign.

BN candidate Ramli had refused to face the other three by-election candidates who already agreed to a live debate to be organised by Bersih 2.0. Ramli also had failed to sign a Bersih 2.0-organised pledges for a fair and clean by-election like the other candidates did.

There were photographs showing a woman clad in a PH T-shirt purportedly handing out money was widely shared on 13 January, which PH explains it was not bribes but just petrol reimbursements for their party volunteers.

Celebrity chef, Dato' Redzuawan Ismail or popularly known as Chef Wan, the son of a Federal Land Development Authority (Felda) settler, said he wants to slap former prime minister Najib Razak and ex-Felda chairman Mohd Isa Abdul Samad for mismanaging the agency into a financial mess while on a cooking programme and campaign trail for Felda settlers in Cameron Highlands on 20 January 2019.

A driver of the Raub Forest Department reported over the use of state government vehicles during the by-election campaign and defended his action of handing over the government vehicle to Deputy Water, Land and Natural Resources Minister Tengku Zulpuri Shah Raja Puji on 21 January 2019.

On Polling Day, M. Manogaran, wore a shirt bearing the party logo to a polling station against the election rules and he was then escorted out by the EC officer.

== Result ==
Malaysian general by-election, 26 January 2019: Cameron Highlands Upon the disqualification of incumbent, Sivarraajh Chandran
Party	Candidate	Votes	%	∆%
BN	Ramli Mohd Nor	12,038	56.18	▲13.88
PH	Manogaran Marimuthu	8,800	41.07	▲1.22
Independent	Sallehudin Ab Talib	314	1.47	N/A
Independent	Wong Seng Yee	276	1.29	N/A
Total valid votes		21,428	100.00	
Total rejected ballots		568		
Unreturned ballots		23		
Turnout		22,019	68.79	
Registered electors		32,009		
Majority		3,238	15.11	
BN hold		Swing		▲6.33
Source(s) "Official: BN retains Cameron, Ramli to be first Orang Asli MP". 26 Jan 2019.

=== Result according to polling district ===
N01 Tanah Rata

Voting District Code	Voting District	Party
078/01/01	Pos Terisu	BN
078/01/02	Pos Telanuk	BN
078/01/03	Pos Lemoi	BN
078/01/04	Pos Mensun	BN
078/01/05	Lembah Bertam	PH
078/01/06	Bandar Ringlet	PH
078/01/07	Habu	PH
078/01/08	Ladang Boh 1	PH
078/01/09	Ladang Boh 2	BN
078/01/10	Kea Farm	PH
078/01/11	Tanah Rata	PH
078/01/12	Berinchang	PH
078/01/13	Ladang Sungai Palas	PH
078/01/14	Ladang Blue Valley	PH
078/01/15	Kampung Raja	PH
078/01/16	Kuala Terla	PH
078/01/17	Teringkap	PH

N02 Jelai

Voting District Code	Voting District	Party
078/02/01	Pos Lanai	BN
078/02/02	Kuala Medang	BN
078/02/03	Tanjung Gahai	BN
078/02/04	Bukit Kota	BN
078/02/05	Kampung Keledek	BN
078/02/06	Lubuk Kulit	BN
078/02/07	FELDA Sungai Koyan Satu	BN
078/02/08	FELDA Sungai Koyan Dua & Tiga	BN
078/02/09	Pos Betau	BN
078/02/10	Pos Sinderut	BN
078/02/11	Pos Lenjang	BN
078/02/12	Pos Titum	BN

Post and Early votes

Voting District	Party
Post Votes	BN
Early Votes	BN

== Previous result ==
Malaysian general election, 2018: Cameron Highlands
Party	Candidate	Votes	%	∆%
BN	Sivarraajh Chandran	10,307	42.30	▼5.74
Pakatan Harapan (2018)	Manogaran Marimuthu	9,710	39.85	▼6.07
PAS	Wan Mahadir Wan Mahmud	3,587	14.72	N/A
Parti Sosialis Malaysia	Suresh Kumar Balasubramaniam	680	2.79	N/A
Pan-Malaysian Islamic Front	Mohd Tahir Kassim	81	0.33	▼3.84
Total valid votes		24,365	100.00	
Total rejected ballots		790		
Unreturned ballots		171		
Turnout		25,326	79.03	
Registered electors		32,048		
Majority		597	2.45	
BN hold		Swing		▲0.17
Source(s) "His Majesty's Government Gazette - Notice of Contested Election, Parliament for the State of Pahang [P.U. (B) 238/2018]" (PDF). Attorney General's Chambers of Malaysia. 3 May 2018. "Federal Government Gazette - Results of Contested Election and Statements of the Poll after the Official Addition of Votes, Parliamentary Constituencies for the State of Pahang [P.U. (B) 312/2018]" (PDF). Attorney General's Chambers of Malaysia. 28 May 2018.
