= Cameron Highlands (federal constituency) =

Malaysian federal constituency

Cameron Highlands (P078)
Pahang constituency

Federal constituency
- Legislature: Dewan Rakyat
- MP: Ramli Mohd Nor; BN
- Constituency created: 2003
- First contested: 2004
- Last contested: 2022

Demographics
- Population (2020): 68,001
- Electors (2022): 46,020
- Area (km²): 3,114
- Pop. density (per km²): 21.8

Cameron Highlands is a federal constituency in Cameron Highlands District and Lipis District, Pahang, Malaysia, that has been represented in the Dewan Rakyat since 2004.

The federal constituency was created in the 2003 redistribution and is mandated to return a single member to the Dewan Rakyat under the first past the post voting system.

== Demographics ==
https://live.chinapress.com.my/ge15/parliament/PAHANG

Ethnic breakdown of Cameron Highlands's electorate as of 2022
1. Malay (30.9%)
2. Other ethnicities (30.0%)
3. Chinese (27.0%)
4. Indian (12.1%)

As of 2020, Cameron Highlands has a population of 68,001 people.

Age breakdown of Cameron Highlands's electorate as of 2022
1. 18-20 (7.17%)
2. 21-29 (22.8%)
3. 30-39 (22.4%)
4. 40-49 (16.8%)
5. 50-59 (13.3%)
6. 60-69 (9.95%)
7. 70-79 (5.19%)
8. 80-89 (1.86%)
9. above 90 (0.50%)
Gender breakdown of Cameron Highlands's electorate as of 2022
1. Male (50.6%)
2. Female (49.4%)

== History ==
=== Polling districts ===
According to the gazette issued on 31 October 2022, the Cameron Highlands constituency has a total of 29 polling districts.

State constituency	Polling Districts	Code	Location
Tanah Rata（N01）	Pos Terisu	078/01/01	SK Terisu
Tanah Rata（N01）	Pos Telanuk	078/01/02	SK Telanuk
Tanah Rata（N01）	Pos Lemoi	078/01/03	SK Lemoi
Tanah Rata（N01）	Pos Mensun	078/01/04	SK Menson
Tanah Rata（N01）	Lembah Bertam	078/01/05	SJK (C) Bertam Valley
Tanah Rata（N01）	Bandar Ringlet	078/01/06	SJK (T) Ringlet
Tanah Rata（N01）	Habu	078/01/07	SMK Ringlet
Tanah Rata（N01）	Ladang Boh 1	078/01/08	SJK (T) Ladang Boh 1
Tanah Rata（N01）	Ladang Boh 2	078/01/09	SJK (T) Ladang Boh 2
Tanah Rata（N01）	Kea Farm	078/01/10	SJK (C) Kea Farm
Tanah Rata（N01）	Tanah Rata	078/01/11	SMK Sultan Ahmad Shah
Tanah Rata（N01）	Berinchang	078/01/12	SJK (C) Brinchang
Tanah Rata（N01）	Ladang Sungai Palas	078/01/13	SJK (T) Ladang Sungai Palas
Tanah Rata（N01）	Ladang Blue Valley	078/01/14	SJK (T) Ladang Blue Valley
Tanah Rata（N01）	Kampung Raja	078/01/15	SK Kampung Raja
Tanah Rata（N01）	Kuala Terla	078/01/16	SJK (C) Kuala Terla
Tanah Rata（N01）	Teringkap	078/01/17	SJK (C) Tringkap
Jelai（N02）	Pos Lanai	078/02/01	SK Lanai
Jelai（N02）	Kuala Medang	078/02/02	SK Kuala Medang
Jelai（N02）	Tanjung Gahai	078/02/03	SK Tanjung Gahai
Jelai（N02）	Bukit Kota	078/02/04	SK Batu Yon
Jelai（N02）	Kampung Keledek	078/02/05	SK Kampung Keledek
Jelai（N02）	Lubuk Kulit	078/02/06	SK Lubok Kulit
Jelai（N02）	FELDA Sungai Koyan Satu	078/02/07	SK LKTP Sungai Koyan
Jelai（N02）	FELDA Sungai Koyan Dua & Tiga	078/02/08	SMK Sungai Koyan
Jelai（N02）	Pos Betau	078/02/09	SK Betau
Jelai（N02）	Pos Sinderut	078/02/10	SK Senderut
Jelai（N02）	Pos Lenjang	078/02/11	SK Lenjang
Jelai（N02）	Pos Titum	078/02/12	SK Titom

=== Representation history ===
Members of Parliament for Cameron Highlands
Parliament	No	Years	Member	Party	Vote Share
Constituency created from Lipis
11th	P078	2004–2008	Devamany Krishnasamy (தேவமணி கிருஷ்ணசாமி)	BN (MIC)	10,226; 72.05%
12th	P078	2008–2013	Devamany Krishnasamy (தேவமணி கிருஷ்ணசாமி)	BN (MIC)	9,164; 60.25%
13th	P078	2013–2014	Palanivel Govindasamy (பழனிவேல் கோவிந்தசாமி)	BN (MIC)	10,506; 48.04%
13th	P078	2014–2018	Palanivel Govindasamy (பழனிவேல் கோவிந்தசாமி)	Independent	10,506; 48.04%
14th	P078	2018	Sivarraajh Chandran (சி. சிவராஜ்)	BN (MIC)	10,307; 42.30%
14th	P078	2019	Ramli Mohd Nor (رملي محمد نور)	BN (Direct)	12,038; 56.18%
14th	P078	2019–2022	Ramli Mohd Nor (رملي محمد نور)	BN (UMNO)	12,038; 56.18%
15th	P078	2022–present	Ramli Mohd Nor (رملي محمد نور)	BN (UMNO)	16,120; 48.46%

=== State constituency ===
Parliamentary constituency	State constituency						
Parliamentary constituency	1955–59*	1959–1974	1974–1986	1986–1995	1995–2004	2004–2018	2018–present
Cameron Highlands						Jelai	
Cameron Highlands						Tanah Rata	

=== Historical boundaries ===
State Constituency	Area	
State Constituency	2003	2018
Jelai	FELDA Sungai Koyan; Pos Betau; Pos Lanai; Pos Lejau; Pos Sinderut	
Tanah Rata	Brinchang; Cameron Highlands; Ringlet; Tanah Rata; Tringkap	

=== Current state assembly members ===
No.	State Constituency	Member	Coalition (Party)
N01	Tanah Rata	Ho Chi Yang	PH (DAP)
N02	Jelai	Wan Rosdy Wan Ismail	BN (UMNO)

=== Local governments & postcodes ===
No.	State Constituency	Local Government	Postcode
N01	Tanah Rata	Cameron Highlands District Council	27650 Sungai Koyan; 39000, 39010 Tanah Rata; 39100 Brinchang; 39200 Ringlet
N02	Jelai	Lipis District Council	27650 Sungai Koyan; 39000, 39010 Tanah Rata; 39100 Brinchang; 39200 Ringlet

== Election results ==
Malaysian general election, 2022
Party	Candidate	Votes	%	∆%
BN	Ramli Mohd Nor	16,120	48.46	▼7.72
PH	Chiong Yoke Kong	11,576	34.80	▼6.27
PN	Abdul Rasid Mohamed Ali	5,569	16.74	▲16.74
Total valid votes		33,265	100.00	
Total rejected ballots		850		
Unreturned ballots		74		
Turnout		34,190	74.29	▼7.03
Registered electors		46,020		
Majority		4,544	13.66	▼1.46
BN hold		Swing		
Source(s) https://lom.agc.gov.my/ilims/upload/portal/akta/outputp/1753278/PUB611_2022.pdf

Malaysian general by-election, 26 January 2019 Upon the disqualification of incumbent, Sivarraajh Chandran
Party	Candidate	Votes	%	∆%
BN	Ramli Mohd Nor	12,038	56.18	▲13.88
PH	Manogaran Marimuthu	8,800	41.07	▲41.07
Independent	Sallehudin Ab Talib	314	1.47	▲1.47
Independent	Wong Seng Yee	276	1.29	▲1.29
Total valid votes		21,428	100.00	
Total rejected ballots		568		
Unreturned ballots		23		
Turnout		22,019	68.79	▼12.53
Registered electors		32,009		
Majority		3,238	15.11	▲12.99
BN hold		Swing		
Source(s) "Official: BN retains Cameron, Ramli to be first Orang Asli MP". 26 Jan 2019.

Malaysian general election, 2018
Party	Candidate	Votes	%	∆%
BN	Sivarraajh Chandran	10,307	42.30	▼5.74
PKR	Manogaran Marimuthu	9,710	39.85	▲39.85
PAS	Wan Mahadir Wan Mahmud	3,587	14.72	▲14.72
Parti Sosialis Malaysia	Suresh Kumar Balasubramaniam	680	2.79	▲2.79
Pan-Malaysian Islamic Front	Mohd Tahir Kassim	81	0.33	▼3.84
Total valid votes		24,365	100.00	
Total rejected ballots		790		
Unreturned ballots		171		
Turnout		25,326	79.03	▼2.29
Registered electors		32,048		
Majority		597	2.45	▲0.33
BN hold		Swing		
Source(s) "His Majesty's Government Gazette - Notice of Contested Election, Parliament for the State of Pahang [P.U. (B) 238/2018]" (PDF). Attorney General's Chambers of Malaysia. 3 May 2018. "Federal Government Gazette - Results of Contested Election and Statements of the Poll after the Official Addition of Votes, Parliamentary Constituencies for the State of Pahang [P.U. (B) 312/2018]" (PDF). Attorney General's Chambers of Malaysia. 28 May 2018.

Malaysian general election, 2013
Party	Candidate	Votes	%	∆%
BN	Palanivel Govindasamy	10,506	48.04	▼12.21
DAP	Manogaran Marimuthu	10,044	45.92	▲6.17
Pan-Malaysian Islamic Front	Mohd Shokri Mahmood	912	4.17	▲4.17
Independent	Alagu Thangarajoo	308	1.41	▲1.41
Independent	Kisho Kumar Kathirveloo	101	0.46	▲0.46
Total valid votes		21,871	100.00	
Total rejected ballots		877		
Unreturned ballots		6		
Turnout		22,754	81.32	▲11.18
Registered electors		27,980		
Majority		462	2.12	▼18.38
BN hold		Swing		
Source(s) "Federal Government Gazette - Notice of Contested Election, Parliament for the State of Pahang [P.U. (B) 175/2013]" (PDF). Attorney General's Chambers of Malaysia. 26 April 2013. "Federal Government Gazette - Results of Contested Election and Statements of the Poll after the Official Addition of Votes, Parliamentary Constituencies for the State of Pahang [P.U. (B) 216/2013]" (PDF). Attorney General's Chambers of Malaysia. 22 May 2013. Archived from the original (PDF) on 1 July 2019.

Malaysian general election, 2008
Party	Candidate	Votes	%	∆%
BN	Devamany S. Krishnasamy	9,164	60.25	▼11.80
DAP	Apalasamy Jataliah	6,047	39.75	▲11.80
Total valid votes		15,211	100.00	
Total rejected ballots		1,186		
Unreturned ballots		59		
Turnout		16,456	70.14	▲4.22
Registered electors		23,461		
Majority		3,117	20.50	▼23.60
BN hold		Swing		

Malaysian general election, 2004
Party	Candidate	Votes	%
BN	Devamany S. Krishnasamy	10,226	72.05
DAP	Apalasamy Jataliah	3,966	27.95
Total valid votes		14,192	100.00
Total rejected ballots		1,010	
Unreturned ballots		0	
Turnout		15,202	65.92
Registered electors		23,061	
Majority		6,260	44.10
This was a new constituency created.
