= Amanah Raya Berhad =

Malaysian trustee company

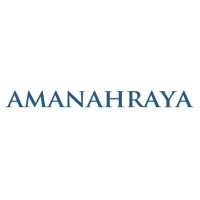
- Formerly: Department of Public Trustee and Official Administrator
- Type: State-owned enterprise
- Founded: 1 May 1921
- Headquarters: Level 34, Vista Tower, The Intermark, 348, Jalan Tun Razak, 50400 Kuala Lumpur, Malaysia
- Parent: Minister of Finance Incorporated
- Subsidiaries: List of subsidiaries
- Website: www.amanahraya.my

Amanah Raya Berhad is a Malaysian trustee company, wholly owned by the Government of Malaysia.

== History ==
Established in 1921 as the Department of Public Trustee and Official Administrator, the company was corporatized in 1995. As of 2023, it is a trustee company, wholly owned by the Government of Malaysia, under the purview of the Ministry of Finance (Malaysia).

Established in 1921 as the Department of Public Trustee and Official Administrator, the company was corporatized in 1995.

In 2021, a public accounts committee found that the company lost RM114.34m in 2019 as a result of making investments without Investment Committee approval. Following the report, Amanah Raya Berhad was advised to conduct an audit, and on 13 June 2022 a follow-up report was presented to parliament.

== Subsidiaries ==
=== Capital markets ===
1. AmanahRaya Investment Management Sdn Bhd (formerly known as AmanahRaya - JMF Asset Management Sdn Bhd)
2. Amanah Raya Capital Sdn Bhd
3. AmanahRaya Investment Bank Ltd
4. AmanahRaya - REIT Managers Sdn Bhd

=== Property management ===
1. AmanahRaya Hartanah Sdn Bhd
2. AmanahRaya Development Sdn Bhd

=== Trust management ===
1. AmanahRaya Trustees Berhad
2. Amanah Raya (Labuan) Limited

== Strategic partnerships ==
1. Bank Islam Malaysia Berhad
2. Malaysia Building Society Berhad
3. Bank Persatuan Malaysia Berhad
4. SME Bank Berhad
5. Kuwait Finance House
6. Bank Simpanan Nasional
7. Affin Islamic Bank Berhad
8. AgroBank Berhad
9. Bank Muamalat Malaysia Berhad
10. Hong Leong Islamic Bank Berhad
11. Bank Kerjasama Rakyat Malaysia Berhad
12. Asian Finance Bank Berhad
13. Al Rajhi Banking & Investment Corporation (M) Berhad
14. Koperasi Pegawai-Pegawai Melayu Malaysia
15. OCBC Al-Amin Bank Berhad
16. Hong Leong Bank Berhad
