= Barisan Nasional =

Political party coalition in Malaysia

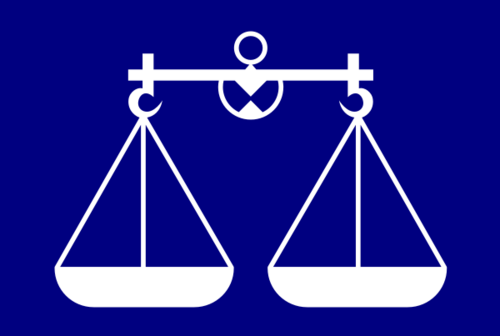
- Flag of Barisan Nasional
- English name: National Front
- Abbreviation: BN
- Chairman: Ahmad Zahid Hamidi
- Secretary-General: Zambry Abdul Kadir
- Deputy Chairman: Mohamad Hasan
- Vice Chairman: Wee Ka Siong; Vigneswaran Sanasee; Arthur Joseph Kurup; Loga Bala Mohan Jaganathan
- Advisor: Najib Razak
- Treasurer-General: Johari Abdul Ghani
- Founder: Abdul Razak Hussein
- Founded: 1 June 1974; 52 years ago
- Preceded by: Alliance Party
- Succeeded by: Gabungan Parti Sarawak (in Sarawak) (2018)
- Headquarters: Aras 8, Menara Dato’ Onn, Putra World Trade Centre, Kuala Lumpur
- Student wing: Barisan Nasional Student Movement
- Youth wing: Barisan Nasional Youth Movement
- Women's wing: Barisan Nasional Women Movement
- Ideology: Majority: Conservatism (Malaysian); Social conservatism; National conservatism; Economic liberalism; Factions: Ketuanan Melayu; Malaysian Chinese interests; Malaysian Indian interests; Dravidian movement; Historical: Anti-communism (until 1989)
- Political position: Centre-right to right-wing
- National affiliation: Perikatan Nasional (2020–2022, since 2026) (Note: From March 2020 to July 2021 as a junior partner in a coalition government, senior partner from August 2021 to October 2022); National Unity Government (since 2022)
- Regional affiliation: Gabungan Rakyat Sabah (2020–2023, since 2025); Gabungan Parti Sarawak (since 2020)
- Member parties: UMNO; MCA; MIC; PBRS; PPP
- Colours: Royal blue; Sky white
- Slogan: Rakyat Didahulukan (People's First, Nation First); Hidup Rakyat (Long Live the People!); Bersama Barisan Nasional (With the National Front); Hidup Negaraku (Long Live the Nation!); Kestabilan dan Kemakmuran (Stability and Prosperity)
- Anthem: Barisan Nasional
- Dewan Negara: 11 / 70
- Dewan Rakyat: 30 / 222
- State Legislative Assemblies: 127 / 612
- Chief minister of states: 5 / 13

Election symbol

Website
- www.barisannasional.org.my

Barisan Nasional (BN; English: National Front) is a political coalition in Malaysia. It was founded in 1974 as a coalition of centre-right and right-wing ethnic political parties to succeed the Alliance Party, and had first competed in the general election that year. It is currently the third largest political coalition with 30 seats in the Dewan Rakyat, the lower house of the Parliament of Malaysia, after Pakatan Harapan (PH) with 82 seats. The coalition is dominated by the United Malays National Organisation (UMNO), the Malaysian Chinese Association (MCA) and the Malaysian Indian Congress (MIC), as well as more minor parties such as the United Sabah People's Party (PBRS) and the People's Progressive Party (PPP), the latter of which has no representation in the Dewan Rakyat.

BN employs the same inter-communal governing model as its predecessor but on a significantly larger scale. In the aftermath of the 13 May incident, the coalition expanded its reach to absorb former opposition parties, eventually growing to include as many as 14 communal political parties at its peak. BN would almost single-handedly dominate Malaysian politics with a supermajority for about 34 years after it was founded. Taken together with its predecessor, it had a combined period of rule over six decades from 1955 to 2018, and was considered the longest uninterrupted ruling political coalition among liberal democracies.

Beginning in 2008, the coalition faced stronger challenges from opposition coalitions, notably the Pakatan Rakyat (PR) in 2013 and later the Pakatan Harapan (PH) alliances. BN eventually lost its hold of the Dewan Rakyat to PH for the first time in Malaysian history after 2018 and became the opposition coalition instead. Consequently, the Sabah and Sarawak component parties of BN left the coalition and formed their own coalitions in 2018 and 2022. In the aftermath of the 2020–2022 Malaysian political crisis, BN returned to power under a Perikatan Nasional (PN)–led government. However, it suffered its worst result in the 2022 general election, falling to third behind PH and PN respectively, but it has stayed in government by supporting its former rival coalition PH under a national unity government, informally known as the Madani.

== History ==
=== Formation ===
Barisan Nasional is the direct successor to the three-party Alliance coalition formed by United Malays National Organisation, Malaysian Chinese Association, and Malaysian Indian Congress. It was founded in the aftermath of the 1969 general election and the 13 May riots. The Alliance Party lost ground in the 1969 election to the opposition parties, in particular the two newly formed parties, Democratic Action Party and Gerakan, as well as Pan-Malaysian Islamic Party. Although the Alliance won a majority of seats, it gained less than half the popular vote, and the resulting tension between different communities led to the May 13 riots and the declaration of a state of emergency. After the Malaysian Parliament reconvened in 1971, negotiations to form a new alliance began with parties such as Gerakan and People's Progressive Party, both of which joined the Alliance in 1972, quickly followed by Pan-Malaysian Islamic Party (PAS) in 1973.

Barisan Nasional, which included regional parties from Sabah and Sarawak (Sabah Alliance Party, Sarawak United Peoples' Party, Parti Pesaka Bumiputera Bersatu), was formally registered in June 1974 as a coalition of nine parties. It contested the 1974 general election as a grand coalition under the leadership of the prime minister Tun Abdul Razak, which it won with considerable success.

=== 1977–2007 ===
In 1977, PAS was expelled from Barisan Nasional following a revolt by PAS within the Kelantan state legislature against the chief minister appointed by the federal government. Barisan Nasional nevertheless won the 1978 general election convincingly, and it continued to dominate Malaysian politics in the 1980s and 1990s despite some losses in state elections, such as the loss of Kelantan to PAS, and Sabah to United Sabah Party which later joined Barisan Nasional.

By 2003, Barisan Nasional had grown to a coalition formed of more than a dozen communal parties. It performed particularly well in the 2004 general election, winning 198 out of 219 seats.

Although Barisan Nasional never achieved more than 67% of the popular vote in elections from 1974 to 2008, it maintained the consecutive two-thirds majority of seats in this period in the Dewan Rakyat until the 2008 election, benefitting from Malaysia's first-past-the-post voting system.

=== 2008–2018 ===
In the 2008 general election, Barisan Nasional lost more than one-third of the parliamentary seats to Pakatan Rakyat, a loose alliance of opposition parties. This marked Barisan's first failure to secure a two-thirds supermajority in Parliament since 1969. Five state governments, namely Selangor, Kelantan, Penang, Perak and Kedah fell to Pakatan Rakyat. Perak however was later returned via a court ruling following a constitutional crisis. Since 2008, the coalition has seen its non-Malay component parties greatly diminished in the peninsula.

The losses continued in the 2013 general election, and it recorded its worst election result at the time. BN regained Kedah but lost several more seats in Parliament along with the popular vote to Pakatan. Despite winning only 47% of the popular vote, it managed to gain 60% of the 222 parliamentary seats, thereby retaining control of the parliament. The 1MDB scandal, which erupted in 2015, further damaged BN's reputation.

During the 2018 general election, Barisan Nasional lost control of the parliament to Pakatan Harapan, winning a total of only 79 parliamentary seats. The crushing defeat ended their 61-year rule of the country, taken together with its predecessor (Alliance), and this paved the way for the first change of government in Malaysian history. The coalition won only 34% of the popular vote amid vote split of Islamic Party. In addition to their failure in regaining the Penang, Selangor and Kelantan state governments, six state governments, namely Johor, Malacca, Negeri Sembilan, Perak, Kedah and Sabah fell to Pakatan Harapan and WARISAN (Sabah). The Terengganu state government also fell but to the Gagasan Sejahtera. Barisan Nasional was only in power in three states: namely Perlis, Pahang and Sarawak.

Many of BN's component parties left the coalition following its humiliating defeat at the 2018 general election, reducing its number to 4 compared to 13 before the election. These parties either aligned themselves with the new Pakatan Harapan federal government, formed a new state-based pact or remained independent. They include three Sabah-based parties (UPKO, PBS and LDP), four Sarawak-based parties (PBB, SUPP, PRS and PDP, which formed a new state-based pact GPS), myPPP (under Kayveas faction) and Gerakan. myPPP experienced a leadership dispute, with Maglin announcing that the party remained within the coalition and Kayveas announcing that the party had left the coalition, resulting in the dissolution of the party on 14 January 2019.

Among the remaining four component parties in Barisan Nasional, UMNO's parliamentary seats have reduced from 54 to 38 since 16 members of parliament left the party, while MCA's parliamentary seat maintains one. MIC's parliamentary seats have reduced from two to one after the Election Court nullified the results of the election for the Cameron Highlands federal constituency due to bribery, but BN regained its seat from a direct member under the 2019 by-election.

As a result of these developments, BN's parliamentary seats have reduced to 41, compared with 79 seats that BN won in the general election.

MCA and MIC made a statement in March 2019 that they want to "move on" and find a new alliance following disputes with the secretary-general, Nazri Abdul Aziz. Mohamad Hasan, the acting BN chairman, chaired a Supreme Council meeting in which all parties showed no consensus on dissolving the coalition.

=== 2019–present ===
In January 2019, all Sabah UMNO branches including Sabah BN branches were dissolved and officially closed, leaving only one BN branch open. This brings the total BN seats in Sabah to only 2 seats.

Since 2019, Barisan Nasional recovered some ground and won a number of by-elections, such as the 2019 Cameron Highlands by-election, 2019 Semenyih by-election, 2019 Rantau by-election, and 2019 Tanjung Piai by-election, defeating Pakatan Harapan.

In September 2019, UMNO decided to form a pact with the Pan-Malaysian Islamic Party (PAS) called Muafakat Nasional. Its main purpose is to unite the Malay Muslim communities for electoral purposes. There was however no formal agreement with the other parties of Barisan Nasional, although there were calls for Barisan Nasional to migrate to Muafakat Nasional. Barisan Nasional continued to function as a coalition of four parties comprising UMNO, MCA, MIC and PBRS but aligned themselves with Perikatan Nasional to form a new government in March 2020 after the collapse of the Pakatan Harapan government. Barisan Nasional form a new government on 15 August 2021 with Perikatan Nasional after the collapse of the Perikatan Nasional government.

Barisan Nasional also recovered control of the Johor, Malacca and Perak state governments.

On 20 November 2021, Barisan Nasional won a two-thirds majority of 21 out of 28 seats in the Malacca State Legislative Assembly.

On 12 March 2022, Barisan gained a landslide victory in the 2022 Johor state election, allowing it to form the much more stable Johor state government with a two-thirds majority in the Johor State Legislative Assembly, which is 40 out of 56 seats while defeating Pakatan Harapan with 12 seats, Perikatan Nasional with 3 seats and Malaysian United Democratic Alliance with 1 seat.

==== 2022 election ====
In the 2022 election, BN faced the worst result in its history, winning 30 out of 222 seats, compared to 82 and 74 seats for Pakatan Harapan and Perikatan Nasional respectively. Several key figures including Tengku Razaleigh Hamzah, Mahdzir Khalid, Azeez Rahim, Tengku Zafrul Aziz, and Khairy Jamaluddin, lost to either PN or PH candidates in their own constituencies. BN also lost several state elections held in Pahang and Perak and won no seats in Perlis. Ahmad Zahid Hamidi, the party president, was re-elected with a slim majority of 348, high decrease from 2018 Malaysian general election which he won with majority of 5073 votes. The election produced a hung parliament, but BN decided to support the biggest coalition Pakatan Harapan and was rewarded with cabinet posts in the government.

== Member parties ==
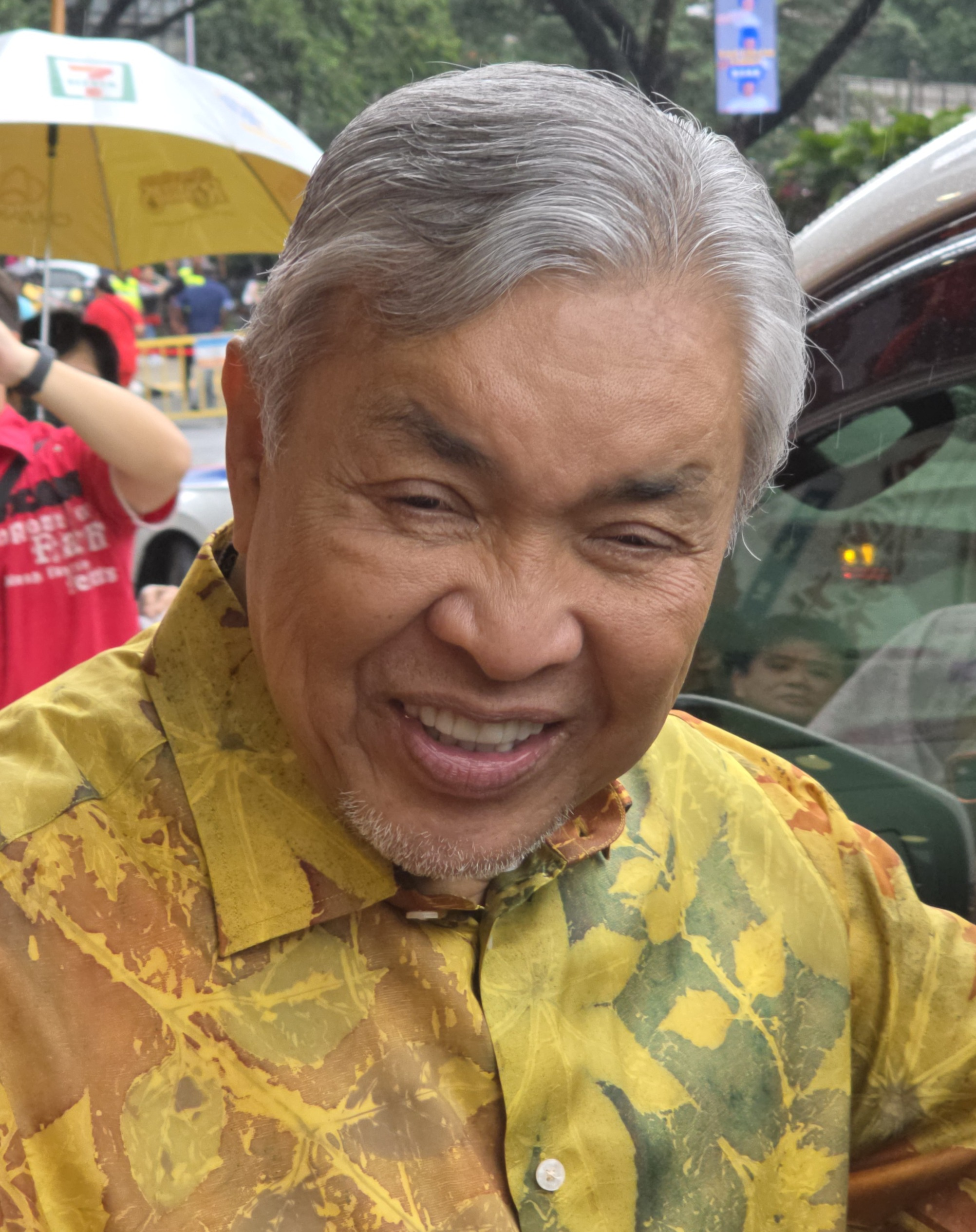
Ahmad Zahid Hamidi, the incumbent Chairman of Barisan Nasional (BN) and President of the United Malays National Organisation (UMNO).

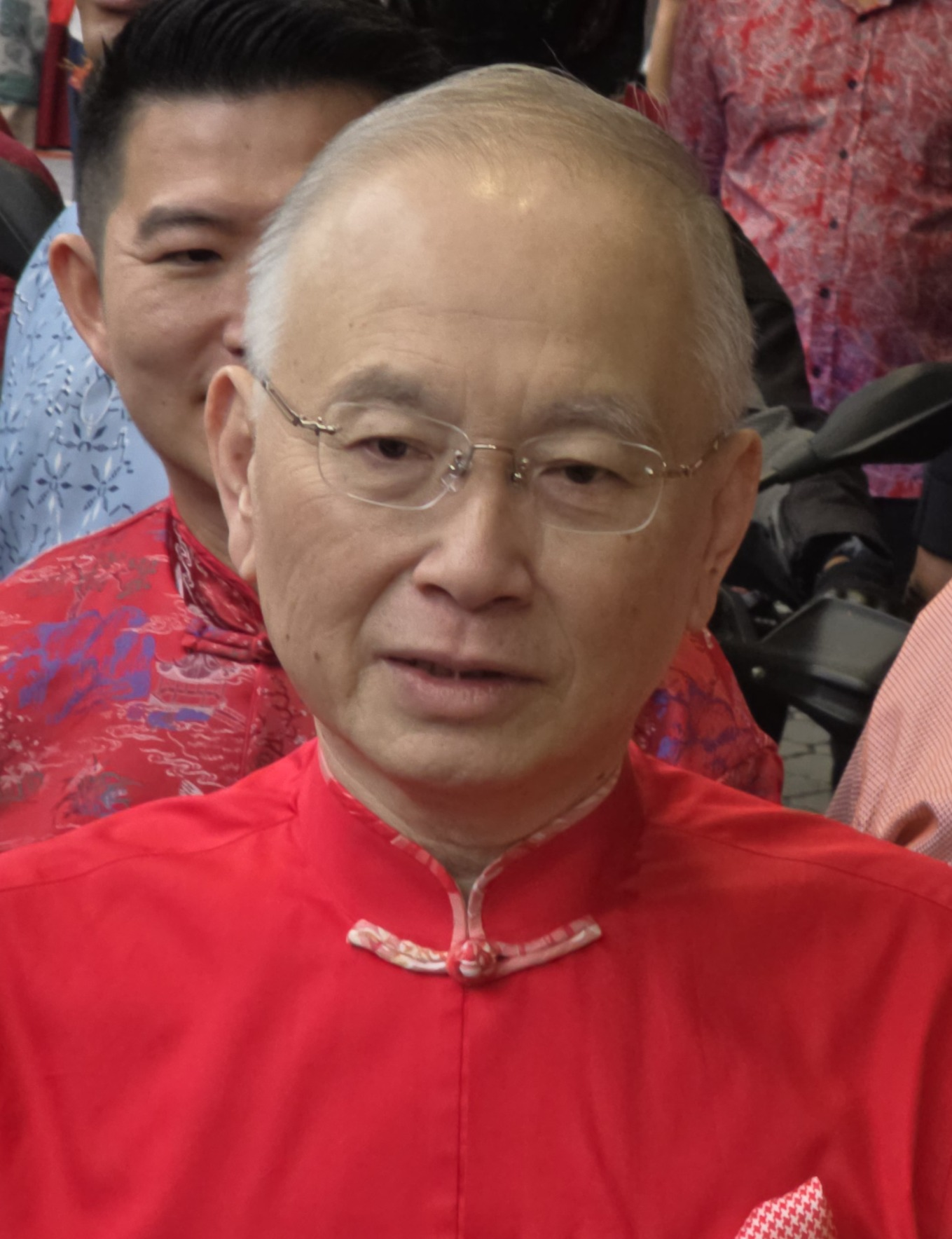
Wee Ka Siong, President of the Malaysian Chinese Association (MCA).

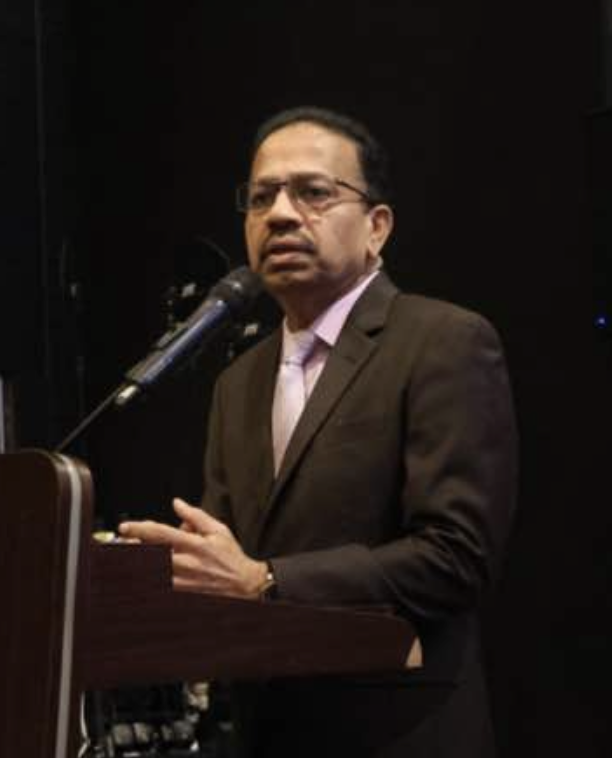
Vigneswaran Sanasee, President of the Malaysian Indian Congress (MIC).

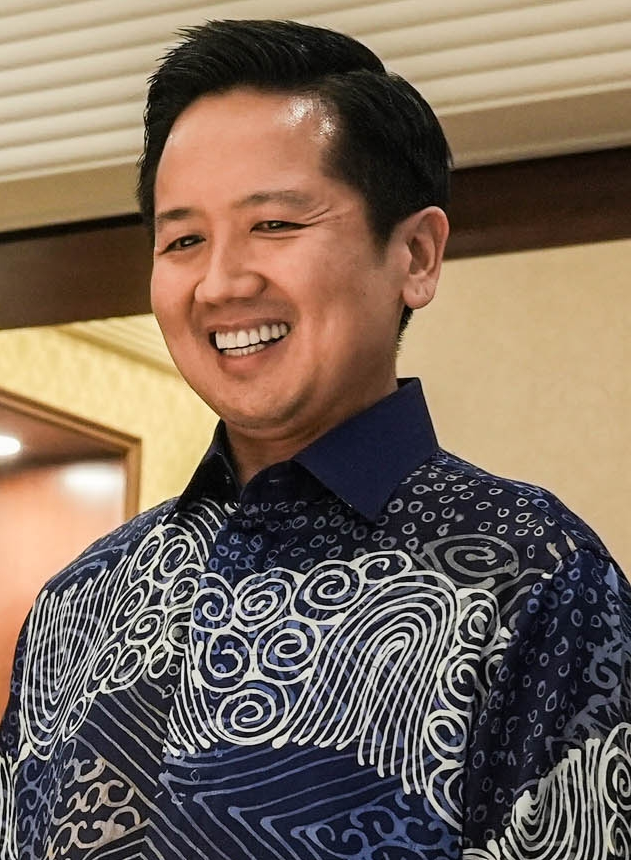
Arthur Joseph Kurup, President of the United Sabah People's Party (PBRS).

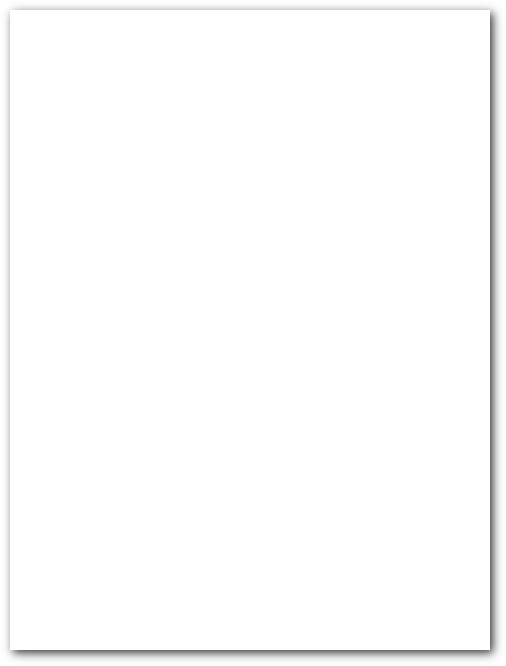
Loga Bala Mohan Jaganathan, President of the People's Progressive Party (PPP).

Logo	Name		Ideology	Position	Leader(s)	Seats contested	2022 result		Current seats	State Legislature Seats
Logo	Name		Ideology	Position	Leader(s)	Seats contested	Votes (%)	Seats	Composition	State Legislature Seats
Member parties
	UMNO	United Malays National Organisation; Pertubuhan Kebangsaan Melayu Bersatu	Ketuanan Melayu	Right-wing	Ahmad Zahid Hamidi	119	16.43%	26 / 222	26 / 30	106 / 612
	MCA	Malaysian Chinese Association; Persatuan Cina Malaysia	Malaysian Chinese interests	Centre-right	Wee Ka Siong	44	4.29%	2 / 222	2 / 30	14 / 612
	MIC	Malaysian Indian Congress; Kongres India Se-Malaysia	Malaysian Indian interests	Centre-right	Vigneswaran Sanasee	10	1.11%	1 / 222	1 / 30	6 / 612
	PBRS	United Sabah People's Party; Parti Bersatu Rakyat Sabah	Sabah nationalism	Right-wing	Arthur Joseph Kurup	2	0.15%	1 / 222	1 / 30	1 / 612
	PPP	People's Progressive Party; Parti Progresif Penduduk	Liberal conservatism Civic nationalism	Centre-right	Loga Bala Mohan Jaganathan	N/A	N/A	0 / 222	0 / 30	0 / 612
Friends of BN
	AMIPF	All Malaysian Indian Progressive Front; Barisan Progresif India Se-Malaysia	Dravidian movement	Centre-right	Loganathan Thoraisamy	1	0.05%	0 / 222	0 / 30	0 / 612
	KIMMA	Malaysian Indian Muslim Congress; Kongres India Muslim Malaysia	Islamism; Indo-Malaysian Muslim interests	Right-wing	Syed Ibrahim Kader	1	0.14%	0 / 222	0 / 30	0 / 612
	MIUP	Malaysian Indian United Party; Parti Bersatu India Malaysia	Dravidian movement	Right-wing	Nallakaruppan Solaimalai	N/A	N/A	0 / 222	0 / 30	0 / 612
	MMSP	Malaysia Makkal Sakti Party; Parti Makkal Sakti Malaysia	Dravidian movement	Right-wing	R.S. Thanenthiran	1	0.07%	0 / 222	0 / 30	0 / 612
	PPM	Punjabi Party of Malaysia; Parti Punjabi Malaysia	Sikhism	Right-wing	Gurjeet Singh Rhande	N/A	N/A	0 / 222	0 / 30	0 / 612
	IKATAN	Malaysia National Alliance Party; Parti Ikatan Bangsa Malaysia	Social democracy	Centre-left	Abdul Kadir Sheikh Fadzir	N/A	N/A	0 / 222	0 / 30	0 / 612
Other allied parties
	MIRA	Minority Rights Action Party; Parti Tindakan Hak Minoriti	Liberal democracy	N/A	S. Gobi Krishnan	N/A	N/A	0 / 222	0 / 30	0 / 612

=== Former member parties ===
*denotes defunct parties

==== Nationwide ====
- Malaysian People's Movement Party (GERAKAN) (1974–2018)
- Malaysian Islamic Party (PAS) (1974–1978)
- Sabah People's United Front (BERJAYA) (1976–1986)*
- Pan-Malaysian Islamic Front (BERJASA) (1978–1983)
- Muslim People's Party of Malaysia (HAMIM) (1983–1989)*

==== Sabah ====
- Sabah Alliance Party (ALLIANCE) (1974–1975)*
  - United Sabah National Organisation (USNO) (1974–1975 under Sabah Alliance, 1976–1984, 1986–1993)*
  - Sabah Chinese Association (SCA) (1974–1975 under Sabah Alliance)*
- Sabah People's United Front (BERJAYA) (1976–1986)*
- United Sabah Party (PBS) (1986–1990, 2002–2018)
- Liberal Democratic Party (LDP) (1991–2018)
- People's Justice Front (AKAR) (1991–2001)*
- Sabah Progressive Party (SAPP) (1994–2008)
- Sabah Democratic Party (PDS) (1995–1999)*
- United Pasokmomogun Kadazandusun Murut Organisation (UPKO) (1999–2018)

==== Sarawak ====
- United Bumiputera Heritage Party (PBB) (1974–2018)
- Sarawak United Peoples' Party (SUPP) (1974–2018)
- Sarawak National Party (SNAP) (1976–2004)* (Note: Ejected from Sarawak BN from 1983 to 1984)
- Sarawak Native People's Party (PBDS) (1983–2004)* (Note: Ejected from Sarawak BN from 1987 to 1994)
- Sarawak Progressive Democratic Party (SPDP/PDP) (2002–2018)
- Sarawak Peoples' Party (PRS) (2004–2018)

=== Former allied parties ===
This list excludes parties allied to Barisan Nasional solely by virtue of coalition of coalitions entered by Barisan Nasional

- Sabah People's United Front (BERJAYA) (1976, 1986–1990)*
- Pan-Malaysian Islamic Front (BERJASA) (1978)
- Parti Cinta Malaysia (PCM) (2009–2017, 2020–2026)*
- Sarawak Workers' Party (SWP) (2013–2016)*
- Sarawak People's Energy Party (TERAS) (2013–2016)
- United People's Party (Sarawak) (UPP) (2014–2018)*
- Minority Rights Action Party (MIRA) (2020–2022)
- Parti Bangsa Malaysia (PBM) (2021–2022)

== Organisational structure ==
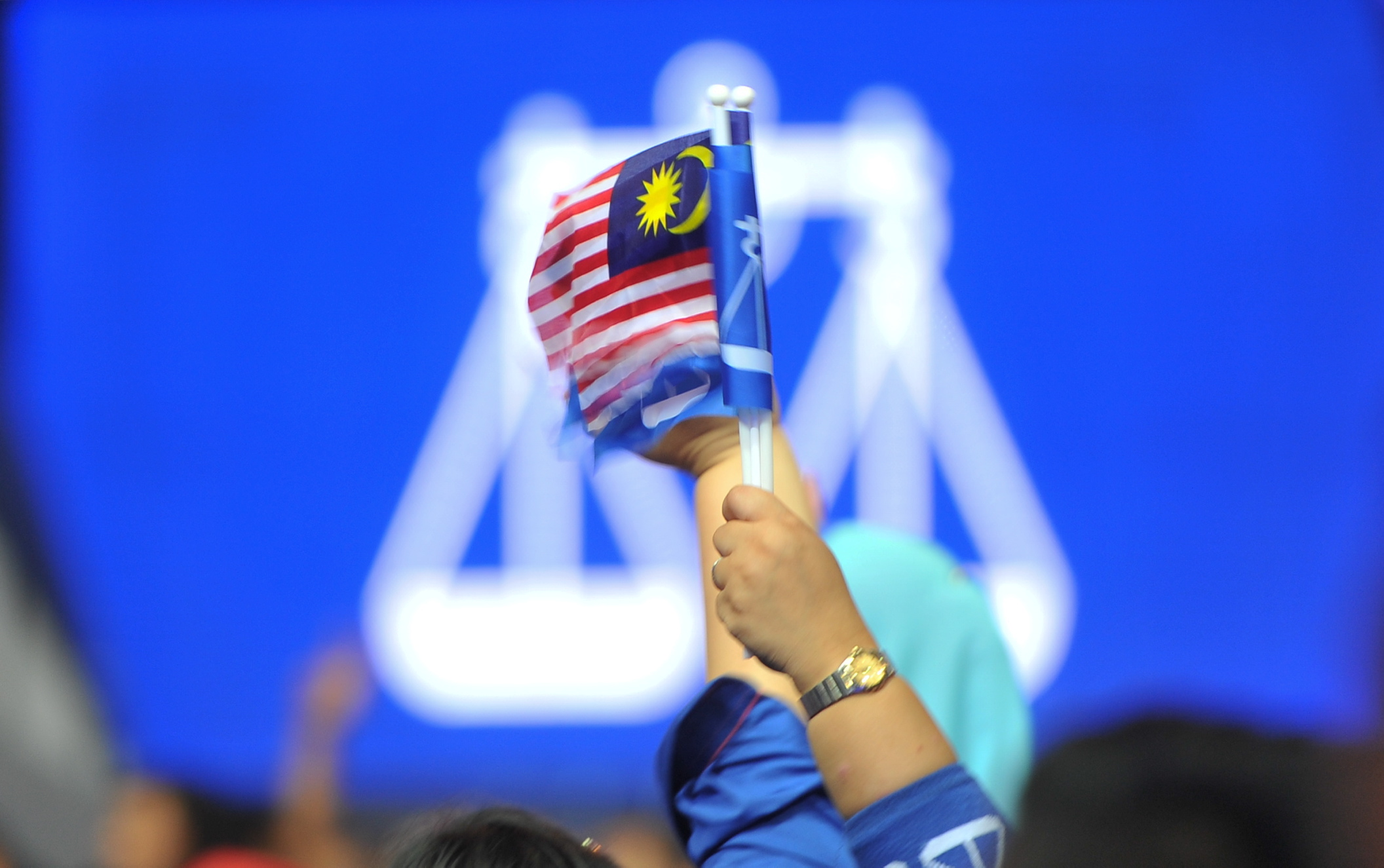
A Barisan Nasional supporter waves a placard during a rally at a stadium in Bukit Jalil in 2013.

In 2013, the vast majority of Barisan Nasional's seats were held by its two largest Bumiputera-based political parties—the United Malays National Organisation, and Parti Pesaka Bumiputera Bersatu. For most of its history, both the Malaysian Chinese Association and Malaysian Indian Congress have played major roles in Barisan Nasional, but their representation in Parliament and state legislatures has become much more diminished. Nevertheless, each component party purports to represent – and limit membership – to a certain race: UMNO for the Malays, MCA for the Chinese and so on. In the view of some scholars:

Since its inception the Alliance remained a coalition of communal parties. Each of the component parties operated to all intents and purposes, save that of elections, as a separate party. Their membership was communal, except perhaps Gerakan, and their success was measured in terms of their ability to achieve the essentially parochial demands of their constituents.

Although both the Alliance and BN registered themselves as political parties, membership is mostly indirect through one of the constituent parties while direct membership is allowed. The BN defines itself as a "confederation of political parties which subscribe to the objects of the Barisan Nasional". Although in elections, all candidates stand under the BN symbol, and there is a BN manifesto, each individual constituent party also issues its own manifesto, and there is intra-coalition competition for seats prior to nomination day.

=== Barisan Nasional Supreme Council ===
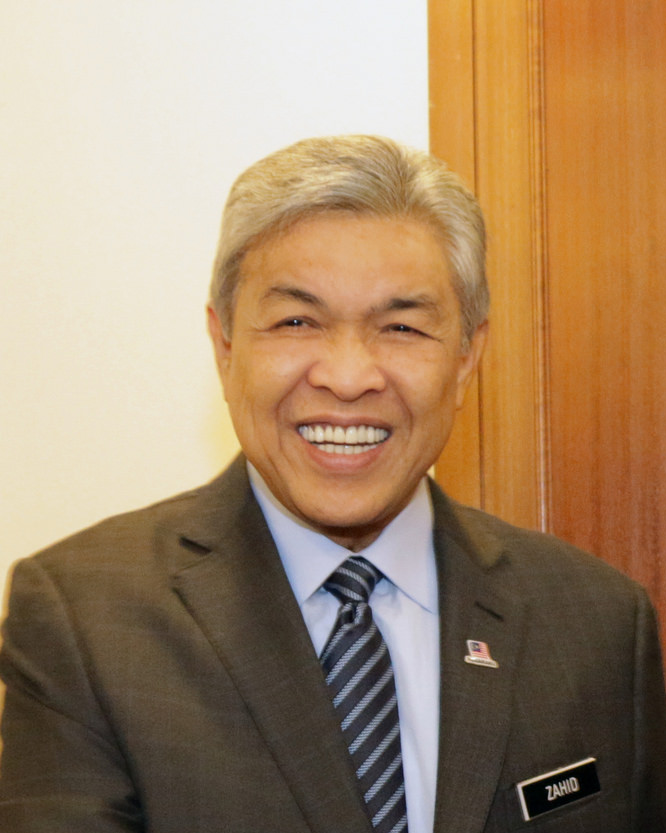
Ahmad Zahid Hamidi, the incumbent Chairman of Barisan Nasional.

- Advisor:
  - Mohd Najib Abdul Razak (UMNO)
- Chairman:
  - Ahmad Zahid Hamidi (UMNO)
- Deputy Chairman:
  - Mohamad Hasan (UMNO)
- Vice-Chairman:
  - Wee Ka Siong (MCA)
  - Vigneswaran Sanasee (MIC)
  - Arthur Joseph Kurup (PBRS)
- Secretary-General:
  - Zambry Abdul Kadir (UMNO)
- Treasurer-General:
  - Johari Abdul Ghani (UMNO)
- Women Leader:
  - Noraini Ahmad (UMNO)
- Youth Leader:
  - Muhamad Akmal Saleh (UMNO)
- Women Youth Leader:
  - Nurul Amal Mohd Fauzi (UMNO)
- Executive Secretary:
  - Ahmad Masrizal Muhammad (UMNO)
- Supreme Council Members:
  - Wan Rosdy Wan Ismail (UMNO)
  - Mohamed Khaled Nordin (UMNO)
  - Mah Hang Soon (MCA)
  - Ti Lian Ker (MCA)
  - Lim Ban Hong (MCA)
  - Yew Teong Look (MCA)
  - Saravanan Murugan (MIC)
  - Sivarraajh Chandran (MIC)
  - Thinalan T. Rajagopalu (MIC)
  - P. Kamalanathan (MIC)
  - Richard Mosinal Kastum (PBRS)
  - Zainon Hj. Kayum (PBRS)
  - Edwin Laimin (PBRS)
  - Freddy Sua (PBRS)
- State Chairman:
  - Johor: Onn Hafiz Ghazi (UMNO)
  - Kedah: Mahdzir Khalid (UMNO)
  - Kelantan: Ahmad Jazlan Yaakub (UMNO)
  - Malacca: Ab Rauf Yusoh (UMNO)
  - Negeri Sembilan: Jalaluddin Alias (UMNO)
  - Pahang: Wan Rosdy Wan Ismail (UMNO)
  - Perak: Saarani Mohammad (UMNO)
  - Penang: Musa Sheikh Fadzir (UMNO)
  - Perlis: Rozabil Abdul Rahman (UMNO)
  - Sabah: Arthur Joseph Kurup (PBRS)
  - Selangor: Megat Zulkarnain Omardin (UMNO)
  - Terengganu: Rozi Mamat (UMNO)
  - Federal Territories: Johari Abdul Ghani (UMNO)

== Leadership ==
=== Chairman ===
No.	Name (Birth–Death)	Portrait	Term of office	
1	Abdul Razak Hussein (1922–1976)		1 January 1973	14 January 1976
2	Hussein Onn (1922–1990)		15 January 1976	28 June 1981
3	Mahathir Mohamad (b. 1925)		28 June 1981	4 February 1988
–	Ling Liong Sik (Acting) (1943-2026)		4 February 1988	16 February 1988
(3)	Mahathir Mohamad (b. 1925)		16 February 1988	30 October 2003
4	Abdullah Ahmad Badawi (1939–2025)		31 October 2003	26 March 2009
5	Najib Razak (b. 1953)		26 March 2009	12 May 2018
6	Ahmad Zahid Hamidi (b. 1953)		30 June 2018	18 December 2018
–	Mohamad Hasan (Acting) (b. 1956)		18 December 2018	30 June 2019
(6)	Ahmad Zahid Hamidi (b. 1953)		30 June 2019	Incumbent

== Elected representatives ==
=== Dewan Negara (Senate) ===
==== Senators ====
- His Majesty's appointee:
  - Zambry Abdul Kadir (UMNO)
  - Rosni Sohar (UMNO)
  - Mohd Zaini Salleh (UMNO)
  - Wong You Fong (MCA)
  - Nur Jazlan Mohamed (UMNO)
- Malacca State Legislative Assembly:
  - Koh Nai Kwong (MCA)
- Johor State Legislative Assembly:
  - Abdul Halim Suleiman (UMNO)
  - Ng Keng Heng (MCA)
- Perak State Legislative Assembly:
  - Shamsuddin Abdul Ghafar (UMNO)
- Pahang State Legislative Assembly:
  - Norhashimi Abdul Ghani (UMNO)
  - Shahrol Wizan Sulong (UMNO)

=== Dewan Rakyat (House of Representatives) ===
==== Members of Parliament of the 15th Malaysian Parliament ====
Barisan Nasional has 30 MPs in the House of Representatives, with 26 MPs (or 92.5%) of them from UMNO.

State	No.	Parliament Constituency	Member	Party
Perak	P055	Lenggong	Shamsul Anuar Nasarah	UMNO
Perak	P072	Tapah	Saravanan Murugan	MIC
Perak	P075	Bagan Datuk	Dr. Ahmad Zahid Hamidi	UMNO
Pahang	P078	Cameron Highlands	Ramli Mohd Nor	UMNO
Pahang	P079	Lipis	Abdul Rahman Mohamad	UMNO
Pahang	P084	Paya Besar	Mohd. Shahar Abdullah	UMNO
Pahang	P085	Pekan	Sh Mohmed Puzi Sh Ali	UMNO
Pahang	P090	Bera	Ismail Sabri Yaakob	UMNO
Kuala Lumpur	P119	Titiwangsa	Johari Abdul Ghani	UMNO
Negeri Sembilan	P126	Jelebu	Jalaluddin Alias	UMNO
Negeri Sembilan	P127	Jempol	Shamshulkahar Mohd. Deli	UMNO
Negeri Sembilan	P129	Kuala Pilah	Adnan Abu Hassan	UMNO
Negeri Sembilan	P131	Rembau	Mohamad Hasan	UMNO
Negeri Sembilan	P133	Tampin	Mohd Isam Mohd Isa	UMNO
Johor	P147	Parit Sulong	Noraini Ahmad	UMNO
Johor	P148	Ayer Hitam	Wee Ka Siong	MCA
Johor	P151	Simpang Renggam	Hasni Mohammad	UMNO
Johor	P153	Sembrong	Hishammuddin Hussein	UMNO
Johor	P155	Tenggara	Manndzri Nasib	UMNO
Johor	P156	Kota Tinggi	Mohamed Khaled Nordin	UMNO
Johor	P157	Pengerang	Azalina Othman Said	UMNO
Johor	P164	Pontian	Ahmad Maslan	UMNO
Johor	P165	Tanjung Piai	Wee Jeck Seng	MCA
Sabah	P173	Putatan	Shahelmey Yahya	UMNO
Sabah	P176	Kimanis	Mohamad Alamin	UMNO
Sabah	P177	Beaufort	Siti Aminah Aching	UMNO
Sabah	P182	Pensiangan	Arthur Joseph Kurup	PBRS
Sabah	P184	Libaran	Suhaimi Nasir	UMNO
Sabah	P187	Kinabatangan	Naim Kurniawan Moktar	UMNO
Sabah	P191	Kalabakan	Andi Muhammad Suryady Bandy	UMNO
Total	Perak (3), Pahang (5), Kuala Lumpur (1), Negeri Sembilan (5), Johor (9), Sabah (7)			

=== Dewan Undangan Negeri (State Legislative Assembly) ===
==== Malaysian State Assembly Representatives ====
Johor State Legislative Assembly
48 / 56
Malacca State Legislative Assembly
21 / 28
Negeri Sembilan State Legislative Assembly
18 / 36
Pahang State Legislative Assembly
19 / 47
Perak State Legislative Assembly
9 / 59
Sabah State Legislative Assembly
6 / 79
Penang State Legislative Assembly
2 / 40
Kelantan State Legislative Assembly
2 / 45
Selangor State Legislative Assembly
2 / 56
Kedah State Legislative Assembly
0 / 36
Perlis State Legislative Assembly
0 / 15
Sarawak State Legislative Assembly
0 / 82
Terengganu State Legislative Assembly
0 / 33

State	No.	Parliamentary Constituency	No.	State Assembly Constituency	Member	Party
Kelantan	P032	Gua Musang	N43	Nenggiri	Mohd Azmawi Fikri Abdul Ghani	UMNO
Kelantan	P032	Gua Musang	N45	Galas	Mohd Syahbuddin Hashim	UMNO
Penang	P041	Kepala Batas	N02	Bertam	Reezal Merican Naina Merican	UMNO
Penang	P047	Nibong Tebal	N21	Sungai Acheh	Rashidi Zinol	UMNO
Perak	P054	Gerik	N02	Temenggor	Salbiah Mohamed	UMNO
Perak	P055	Lenggong	N04	Kota Tampan	Saarani Mohammad	UMNO
Perak	P062	Sungai Siput	N21	Lintang	Mohd Zolkafly Harun	UMNO
Perak	P068	Beruas	N36	Pengkalan Baharu	Azman Noh	UMNO
Perak	P069	Parit	N39	Belanja	Khairudin Abu Hanipah	UMNO
Perak	P072	Tapah	N47	Chenderiang	Choong Shin Heng	MCA
Perak	P072	Tapah	N48	Ayer Kuning	Mohamad Yusri Bakir	UMNO
Perak	P075	Bagan Datuk	N53	Rungkup	Shahrul Zaman Yahya	UMNO
Perak	P077	Tanjong Malim	N59	Behrang	Salina Samsudin	UMNO
Pahang	P078	Cameron Highlands	N02	Jelai	Wan Rosdy Wan Ismail	UMNO
Pahang	P079	Lipis	N03	Padang Tengku	Mustapa Long	UMNO
Pahang	P079	Lipis	N05	Benta	Mohd. Soffi Abd. Razak	UMNO
Pahang	P80	Raub	N06	Batu Talam	Abd. Aziz Mat Kiram	UMNO
Pahang	P80	Raub	N08	Dong	Fazdzli Kamal	UMNO
Pahang	P83	Kuantan	N16	Inderapura	Shafik Fauzan Sharif	UMNO
Pahang	P85	Pekan	N21	Peramu Jaya	Nizar Najib	UMNO
Pahang	P85	Pekan	N22	Bebar	Mohd. Fakhruddin Mohd. Ariff	UMNO
Pahang	P85	Pekan	N23	Chini	Mohd Sharim Md Zain	UMNO
Pahang	P87	Kuala Krau	N27	Jenderak	Rodzuan Zaaba	UMNO
Pahang	P87	Kuala Krau	N28	Kerdau	Syed Ibrahim Syed Ahmad	UMNO
Pahang	P89	Bentong	N35	Sabai	Arumugam Veerappa Pillai	MIC
Pahang	P89	Bentong	N36	Pelangai	Amizar Abu Adam	UMNO
Pahang	P90	Bera	N37	Guai	Sabariah Sadan	UMNO
Pahang	P90	Bera	N39	Kemayan	Khairulnizam Mohamad Zuldin	UMNO
Pahang	P091	Rompin	N41	Muadzam Shah	Razali Kassim	UMNO
Pahang	P091	Rompin	N42	Tioman	Mohd Johari Hussain	UMNO
Pahang			—	Nominated member	Haris Salleh Hamzah	UMNO
Pahang			—	Nominated member	Wong Tat Chee	MCA
Selangor	P092	Sabak Bernam	N01	Sungai Air Tawar	Rizam Ismail	UMNO
Selangor	P101	Hulu Langat	N23	Dusun Tua	Johan Abd Aziz	UMNO
Negeri Sembilan	P126	Jelebu	N01	Chennah	John Siow Kow Choon	MCA
Negeri Sembilan	P126	Jelebu	N02	Pertang	Jalaluddin Alias	UMNO
Negeri Sembilan	P126	Jelebu	N03	Sungai Lui	Mohd Razi Mohd Ali	UMNO
Negeri Sembilan	P127	Jempol	N06	Palong	Mustapha Nagoor	UMNO
Negeri Sembilan	P127	Jempol	N07	Jeram Padang	Mohd Zaidy Abdul Kadir	UMNO
Negeri Sembilan	P128	Seremban	N09	Lenggeng	Mohd Asna Amin	UMNO
Negeri Sembilan	P129	Kuala Pilah	N15	Juasseh	Ismail Lasim	UMNO
Negeri Sembilan	P129	Kuala Pilah	N16	Seri Menanti	Abdul Samad Ibrahim	UMNO
Negeri Sembilan	P129	Kuala Pilah	N17	Senaling	Qayyum Abd Jalil	UMNO
Negeri Sembilan	P129	Kuala Pilah	N18	Pilah	S Leza Md Yasin	UMNO
Negeri Sembilan	P129	Kuala Pilah	N19	Johol	Saiful Yazan Sulaiman	UMNO
Negeri Sembilan	P130	Rasah	N20	Labu	Siti Nur Umaira Hasim	UMNO
Negeri Sembilan	P131	Rembau	N26	Chembong	Zaifulbahri Idris	UMNO
Negeri Sembilan	P131	Rembau	N27	Rantau	Mohamad Hasan	UMNO
Negeri Sembilan	P131	Rembau	N28	Kota	Suhaimi Aini	UMNO
Negeri Sembilan	P132	Port Dickson	N32	Linggi	Mohd Faizal Ramli	UMNO
Negeri Sembilan	P133	Tampin	N35	Gemencheh	Suhaimizan Bizar	UMNO
Negeri Sembilan	P133	Tampin	N36	Repah	Koh Kim Swee	MCA
Malacca	P134	Masjid Tanah	N01	Kuala Linggi	Rosli Abdullah	UMNO
Malacca	P134	Masjid Tanah	N02	Tanjung Bidara	Ab Rauf Yusoh	UMNO
Malacca	P134	Masjid Tanah	N03	Ayer Limau	Hameed Mytheen Kunju Basheer	UMNO
Malacca	P134	Masjid Tanah	N04	Lendu	Abdul Hakim Abdul Wahid	UMNO
Malacca	P134	Masjid Tanah	N05	Taboh Naning	Zulkiflee Mohd Zin	UMNO
Malacca	P135	Alor Gajah	N06	Rembia	Ahmad Norazril Abd Aziz	UMNO
Malacca	P135	Alor Gajah	N07	Gadek	Nadarajah Sellappa	MIC
Malacca	P135	Alor Gajah	N08	Machap Jaya	Ngwe Hee Sem	MCA
Malacca	P135	Alor Gajah	N09	Durian Tunggal	Mustafa Musa	UMNO
Malacca	P135	Alor Gajah	N10	Asahan	Fairul Nizam Roslan	UMNO
Malacca	P136	Tangga Batu	N11	Sungai Udang	Rais Yasin	UMNO
Malacca	P136	Tangga Batu	N12	Pantai Kundor	Tuminah Kadi	UMNO
Malacca	P136	Tangga Batu	N14	Kelebang	Lim Ban Hong	MCA
Malacca	P137	Hang Tuah Jaya	N15	Pengkalan Batu	Siti Aisyah Mahmood	UMNO
Malacca	P137	Hang Tuah Jaya	N18	Ayer Molek	Mohd Ridhwan Mohd Ali	UMNO
Malacca	P138	Kota Melaka	N21	Duyong	Mohd Noor Helmy Abu Halem	UMNO
Malacca	P138	Kota Melaka	N23	Telok Mas	Abdul Razak Abdul Rahman	UMNO
Malacca	P139	Jasin	N25	Rim	Khaidhirah Abu Zahar	UMNO
Malacca	P139	Jasin	N26	Serkam	Azman Abdullah	UMNO
Malacca	P139	Jasin	N27	Merlimau	Muhamad Akmal Saleh	UMNO
Malacca	P139	Jasin	N28	Sungai Rambai	Jezlee Pit	UMNO
Johor	P140	Segamat	N01	Buloh Kasap	Zahari Sarip	UMNO
Johor	P140	Segamat	N02	Jementah	See Ann Giap	MCA
Johor	P141	Sekijang	N03	Pemanis	Anuar Abdul Manap	UMNO
Johor	P141	Sekijang	N04	Kemelah	Raven Kumar Krishnasamy	MIC
Johor	P142	Labis	N05	Tenang	Mohd Azahar Ibrahim	UMNO
Johor	P142	Labis	N06	Bekok	Tan Chong	MCA
Johor	P143	Pagoh	N07	Bukit Kepong	Ahmad Syar'e Yusof	UMNO
Johor	P143	Pagoh	N08	Bukit Pasir	Mohamad Fazli Mohamad Salleh	UMNO
Johor	P144	Ledang	N09	Gambir	Sahrihan Jani	UMNO
Johor	P144	Ledang	N10	Tangkak	Haw Chin Teck	MCA
Johor	P144	Ledang	N11	Serom	Nadhirah Afiqah Abdul Rahim	UMNO
Johor	P145	Bakri	N14	Bukit Naning	Mohd Ghazali Sabari	UMNO
Johor	P146	Muar	N15	Maharani	Ashari Md Sarip	UMNO
Johor	P146	Muar	N16	Sungai Balang	Selamat Takim	UMNO
Johor	P147	Parit Sulong	N17	Semerah	Mohd Fared Mohd Khalid	UMNO
Johor	P147	Parit Sulong	N18	Sri Medan	Zulkurnain Kamisan	UMNO
Johor	P148	Ayer Hitam	N19	Yong Peng	Ling Tian Soon	MCA
Johor	P148	Ayer Hitam	N20	Semarang	Samsolbari Jamali	UMNO
Johor	P149	Sri Gading	N21	Parit Yaani	Mohamad Najib Samuri	UMNO
Johor	P149	Sri Gading	N22	Pasir Raja	Nor Rashidah Ramli	UMNO
Johor	P150	Batu Pahat	N24	Senggarang	Mohd Yusla Ismail	UMNO
Johor	P150	Batu Pahat	N25	Rengit	Zaidi Japar	UMNO
Johor	P151	Simpang Renggam	N26	Machap	Onn Hafiz Ghazi	UMNO
Johor	P151	Simpang Renggam	N27	Layang-Layang	Chua Jian Boon	MCA
Johor	P152	Kluang	N29	Mahkota	Syed Hussien Syed Abdullah	UMNO
Johor	P153	Sembrong	N30	Paloh	Lee Ting Han	MCA
Johor	P153	Sembrong	N31	Kahang	Rugendran Vellayan	MIC
Johor	P154	Mersing	N32	Endau	Alwiyah Talib	UMNO
Johor	P154	Mersing	N33	Tenggaroh	Mohd Youzaimi Yusof	UMNO
Johor	P155	Tenggara	N34	Panti	Muhammad Naqib Md Ghazali	UMNO
Johor	P155	Tenggara	N35	Pasir Raja	Adham Baba	UMNO
Johor	P156	Kota Tinggi	N36	Sedili	Muszaide Makmor	UMNO
Johor	P156	Kota Tinggi	N37	Johor Lama	Norlizah Noh	UMNO
Johor	P157	Pengerang	N38	Penawar	Fauziah Misri	UMNO
Johor	P157	Pengerang	N39	Tanjung Surat	Aznan Tamin	UMNO
Johor	P158	Tebrau	N40	Tiram	Abdul Halim Suleiman	UMNO
Johor	P159	Pasir Gudang	N42	Johor Jaya	Chan San San	MCA
Johor	P159	Pasir Gudang	N43	Permas	Baharudin Mohamed Taib	UMNO
Johor	P160	Johor Bahru	N44	Larkin	Mohd Hairi Mad Shah	UMNO
Johor	P161	Pulai	N46	Perling	Pannir Selvam Paliksina	MIC
Johor	P161	Pulai	N47	Kempas	Ramlee Bohani	UMNO
Johor	P162	Iskandar Puteri	N49	Kota Iskandar	Pandak Ahmad	UMNO
Johor	P163	Kulai	N50	Bukit Permai	Mohd Jafni Md Shukor	UMNO
Johor	P163	Kulai	N51	Bukit Batu	Kumaran Ramakrishnan	MIC
Johor	P164	Pontian	N53	Benut	Mohd Sumali Reduan	UMNO
Johor	P164	Pontian	N54	Pulai Sebatang	Hasrunizah Hassan	UMNO
Johor	P165	Tanjung Piai	N55	Pekan Nanas	Tan Eng Meng	MCA
Johor	P165	Tanjung Piai	N56	Kukup	Md Israk Abdullah	UMNO
Sabah	P167	Kudat	N02	Bengkoka	Harun Durabi	UMNO
Sabah	P180	Keningau	N41	Liawan	Nik Mohd Nadzri Nik Zawawi	UMNO
Sabah	P182	Pensiangan	N45	Sook	Arthur Joseph Kurup	PBRS
Sabah	P187	Kinabatangan	N58	Lamag	Mohd Ismail Ayob	UMNO
Sabah	P187	Kinabatangan	N59	Sukau	Jafry Ariffin	UMNO
Sabah	P188	Lahad Datu	N63	Kunak	Anil Jeet Singh	UMNO
Total	Kelantan (2), Penang (2), Perak (9), Pahang (19), Selangor (2), Negeri Sembilan (18), Malacca (21), Johor (48), Sabah (6)					

== Government offices ==
=== Governors ===
State	Leader type	Member	Party
Penang	Yang Di-Pertua Negeri	Ramli Ngah Talib	UMNO
Sabah	Yang Di-Pertua Negeri	Musa Aman	UMNO

=== Ministerial posts ===
Portfolio	Office Bearer	Party	Constituency
Deputy Prime Minister Minister of Rural and Regional Development Minister Responsible for National Disaster Management Agency	Ahmad Zahid Hamidi MP	UMNO	Bagan Datuk
Minister of Foreign Affairs	Mohamad Hasan MP	UMNO	Rembau
Minister of Defence	Mohamed Khaled Nordin MP	UMNO	Kota Tinggi
Minister in the Prime Minister's Department (Law and Institutional Reform)	Azalina Othman Said MP	UMNO	Pengerang
Minister of Higher Education	Senator Dato' Seri Diraja Dr. Zambry Abdul Kadir	UMNO	Senator
Minister of Investment, Trade and Industry	Johari Abdul Ghani MP	UMNO	Titiwangsa
Minister of Plantation and Commodities	Noraini Ahmad MP	UMNO	Parit Sulong
Minister of Natural Resources and Environmental Sustainability	Arthur Joseph Kurup MP MLA	PBRS	Pensiangan

Portfolio	Office Bearer	Party	Constituency
Deputy Minister of Works	Ahmad Maslan MP	UMNO	Pontian
Deputy Minister of Energy Transition and Water Transformation	Abdul Rahman Mohamad MP	UMNO	Lipis
Deputy Minister of Home Affairs	Shamsul Anuar Nasarah MP	UMNO	Lenggong
Deputy Minister of Entrepreneur and Cooperatives Development	Mohamad Alamin MP	UMNO	Kimanis
Deputy Minister of Economy	Mohd Shahar Abdullah MP	UMNO	Paya Besar

=== State governments ===
State	Leader type	Member	Party	State Constituency
Johor	Menteri Besar	Onn Hafiz Ghazi	UMNO	Machap
Malacca	Chief Minister	Ab Rauf Yusoh	UMNO	Tanjung Bidara
Negeri Sembilan	Menteri Besar	Ismail Lasim	UMNO	Juasseh
Pahang	Menteri Besar	Wan Rosdy Wan Ismail	UMNO	Jelai
Perak	Menteri Besar	Saarani Mohammad	UMNO	Kota Tampan

State	Leader type	Member	Party	State Constituency
Perak	Senior EXCO	Mohd Zolkafly Harun	UMNO	Lintang

Barisan Nasional also forms the state governments of Penang and Selangor in coalition with Pakatan Harapan, following the formation of the federal unity government (Kerajaan Perpaduan) in the aftermath of the 15th general election of November 2022, and the state government of Sabah in coalition with Gabungan Rakyat Sabah.

- Pahang (1974–present)
- Sarawak (1974–2018)
- Johor (1974–2018, 2020–present)
- Malacca (1974–2018, 2020–present)
- Perak (1974–2008, 2009–2018, 2020, 2020–present)
- Penang (1974–2008, 2022–present)
- Selangor (1974–2008, 2022–present)
- Negeri Sembilan (1974–2018, 2022–2026, 2026–present)
- Sabah (1974–1975, 1976, 1976–1985, 1986–1990, 1994–2018, 2020–2023, 2023–2025, 2025–present)
- Perlis (1974–2022)
- Terengganu (1974–1999, 2004–2018)
- Kelantan (1974–1977, 1977–1978, 1978–1990)
- Kedah (1974–2008, 2013–2018, 2020–2022)

Note: bold as Menteri Besar/Chief Minister, italic as junior partner

=== Legislative leadership ===
Portfolio	Office Bearer	Party	Constituency
Deputy Speaker of the Dewan Rakyat	Dato' Ramli Mohd Nor MP	UMNO	Cameron Highlands
Deputy President of the Dewan Negara	Senator Datuk Nur Jazlan Mohamed	UMNO	At-large

State	Leader type	Member	Party	State Constituency
Johor	Speaker	Zahari Sarip	UMNO	Buloh Kasap
Johor	Deputy Speaker	Samsolbari Jamali	UMNO	Semarang
Malacca	Speaker	Ibrahim Durum	UMNO	Non-MLA
Negeri Sembilan	Speaker	Awaludin Said	UMNO	Non-MLA
Pahang	Speaker	Mohd Sharkar Shamsudin	UMNO	Non-MLA
Perak	Speaker	Mohamad Zahir Abdul Khalid	UMNO	Non-MLA
Sabah	Speaker	Kadzim M Yahya	UMNO	Non-MLA

=== Official opposition ===
State	Leader type	Member	Party	State Constituency
Kelantan	Opposition Leader	Mohd Syahbuddin Hashim	UMNO	Galas

== Election results ==
=== General election results ===
Election	Total seats won	Seats contested	Share of seats	Total votes	Share of votes	Outcome of election	Election leader
1974	135 / 154	154	87.7%	1,287,400	60.8%	▲135 seats; Governing coalition	Abdul Razak Hussein
1978	131 / 154	154	85.1%	1,987,907	57.2%	▼4 seats; Governing coalition	Hussein Onn
1982	132 / 154	154	85.7%	2,522,079	60.5%	▲1 seats; Governing coalition	Mahathir Mohamad
1986	148 / 177	177	83.6%	2,649,263	57.3%	▲16 seats; Governing coalition	Mahathir Mohamad
1990	127 / 180	180	70.6%	2,985,392	53.4%	▼21 seats; Governing coalition	Mahathir Mohamad
1995	162 / 192	192	84.4%	3,881,214	65.2%	▲35 seats; Governing coalition	Mahathir Mohamad
1999	148 / 193	193	76.2%	3,748,511	56.53%	▼15 seats; Governing coalition	Mahathir Mohamad
2004	198 / 219	219	90.4%	4,420,452	63.9%	▲51 seats; Governing coalition	Abdullah Ahmad Badawi
2008	140 / 222	222	63.1%	4,082,411	50.27%	▼58 seats; Governing coalition	Abdullah Ahmad Badawi
2013	133 / 222	221	59.9%	5,237,555	47.38%	▼7 seats; Governing coalition	Najib Razak
2018	79 / 222	222	35.59%	3,794,827	33.96%	▼54 seats; Opposition coalition (2018-2020); Governing coalition with Perikatan Nasional (2020-2022)	Najib Razak
2022	30 / 222	178	13.51%	3,462,231	22.36%	▼49 seats; Governing coalition with Pakatan Harapan, Gabungan Parti Sarawak, Gabungan Rakyat Sabah and Parti Warisan	Ahmad Zahid Hamidi

=== State election results ===
State assembly	Election	Votes	%	Seats	Won/contested	+/–	Position	Status
Perlis	2022	36,301	24.5	0 / 15	0 / 15	▼10	▼3rd	No seats
Kedah	2023	116,340	10.0	0 / 36	0 / 15	▼3	3rd	No seats
Kelantan	2023	178,347	20.9	1 / 45	1 / 31	▼7	2nd	Opposition
Terengganu	2023	197,972	28.7	0 / 32	0 / 27	▼10	2nd	No seats
Penang	2023	49,476	5.6	2 / 40	2 / 6	Steady	▼3rd	PH–BN
Perak	2022	380,816	25.7	9 / 59	9 / 59	▼18	▼3rd	BN–PH
Pahang	2022	333,621	38.5	17 / 42	17 / 42	▼8	▼2nd	BN–PH
Selangor	2023	246,053	9.2	2 / 56	2 / 12	▼2	▼3rd	PH–BN
Negeri Sembilan	2026	227,067	35.6	18 / 36	18 / 25	▲4	▲1st	BN–PN
Malacca	2026	240,651	49.2	21 / 28	21 / 23	Steady	1st	BN–PN
Johor	2026	1,118,559	59.7	48 / 56	48 / 56	▲8	1st	BN
Sabah	2025	144,584	12.8	6 / 73	6 / 45	▼8	▼3rd	GRS–PH–BN
Sarawak	Ceased to exist after 2018							

State election	State Legislative Assembly													
State election	Perlis	Kedah	Kelantan	Terengganu	Penang	Perak	Pahang	Selangor	Negeri Sembilan	Malacca	Johor	Sabah	Sarawak	Total won / Total contested
2/3 majority	2 / 3	2 / 3	2 / 3	2 / 3	2 / 3	2 / 3	2 / 3	2 / 3	2 / 3	2 / 3	2 / 3	2 / 3	2 / 3	
1974	12 / 12	24 / 26	36 / 36	27 / 28	23 / 27	31 / 42	32 / 32	30 / 33	21 / 24	16 / 20	31 / 32		30 / 48	
1976														
1978	12 / 12	19 / 26	23 / 36	28 / 28	20 / 27	32 / 42	32 / 32	29 / 33	21 / 24	16 / 20	31 / 32			239 / 257
1979														
1981														
1982	11 / 12	24 / 26	26 / 36	23 / 28	25 / 27	38 / 42	31 / 32	31 / 33	22 / 24	18 / 20	32 / 32			
1983													30 / 48	30 / 32
1985												6 / 48		6 / 48
1986	14 / 14	25 / 28	29 / 39	30 / 32	23 / 33	33 / 46	32 / 33	37 / 42	24 / 28	17 / 20	35 / 36	1 / 48		300 / 351
1987													28 / 48	28 / 48
1990	14 / 14	26 / 28	0 / 39	22 / 32	19 / 33	33 / 46	31 / 33	35 / 42	24 / 28	17 / 20	32 / 36	0 / 48		253 / 351
1991													49 / 56	49 / 56
1994												23 / 48		23 / 48
1995	15 / 15	34 / 36	7 / 43	25 / 32	32 / 33	51 / 52	37 / 38	45 / 48	30 / 32	22 / 25	40 / 40			338 / 394
1996													57 / 62	57 / 64
1999	12 / 15	24 / 36	2 / 43	4 / 32	30 / 33	44 / 52	30 / 38	42 / 48	32 / 32	21 / 25	40 / 40	31 / 48		312 / 329
2001													60 / 62	60 / 62
2004	14 / 15	31 / 36	21 / 45	28 / 32	38 / 40	52 / 59	41 / 42	54 / 56	34 / 36	26 / 28	55 / 56	59 / 60		452 / 504
2006													62 / 71	62 / 71
2008	14 / 15	14 / 36	6 / 45	24 / 32	11 / 40	28 / 59	37 / 42	20 / 56	21 / 36	23 / 28	50 / 56	59 / 60		307 / 504
2011													55 / 71	55 / 71
2013	13 / 15	21 / 36	12 / 45	17 / 32	10 / 40	31 / 59	30 / 42	12 / 56	22 / 36	21 / 28	38 / 56	48 / 60		275 / 505
2016													77 / 82	77 / 82
2018	10 / 15	3 / 36	8 / 45	10 / 32	2 / 40	24 / 59	25 / 42	4 / 56	16 / 36	13 / 28	16 / 56	29 / 60		160 / 505
2020												14 / 73		14 / 41
2021										21 / 28				21 / 28
2022											40 / 56			40 / 56
2022	0 / 15					9 / 59	17 / 42							25 / 116
2023		0 / 36	1 / 45	0 / 32	2 / 40			2 / 56	14 / 36					19 / 108
2025												6 / 73		6 / 45
2026									18 / 36	21 / 28	48 / 56			87 / 104
