= Responses to the COVID-19 pandemic in April 2021 =

Aspect of viral disease pandemic

This article documents the chronology of the response to the COVID-19 pandemic in April 2021, which originated in Wuhan, China in December 2019. Some developments may become known or fully understood only in retrospect. Reporting on this pandemic began in December 2019.

== Reactions and measures in South and Southeast Asia ==
=== 1 April ===
- The Malaysian Health Minister Adham Baba announced that the second phase of the country's National Covid-19 Immunisation Programme would start on 17 April 2021, two days ahead of the earlier scheduled date.

=== 15 April ===
- The Maldives offers tourists COVID vaccines to increase tourism.

=== 15 April ===
- In response to rising cases that week, the Health Minister Adham Baba proposed retaining a ban on interstate travel during the Eid al-Fitr period.

=== 19 April ===
- Sarawak Chief Minister Datuk Abang Abdul Rahman Johari Abang Openg announces that all schools in the Malaysian state's red zones will be closed for two weeks commencing 20 April.

=== 22 April ===
- The Malaysian Deputy Education Minister Mah Hang Soon has announced that any school with as few as one confirmed case will be required to close for at least two days. The affected students will switch to online learning until physical classes can resume.

=== 27 April ===
- On 27 April, Malaysian Health Minister Adham Baba has announced that health authorities have authorised the use of the Oxford–AstraZeneca COVID-19 vaccine in Malaysia.

== Reactions and measures in the Western Pacific ==
=== 1 April ===
- The New Zealand Government has increased the number of emergency spots available in managed isolation for citizens and residents visiting terminally ill relatives or returning from overseas after visiting terminally ill relatives; citizens and residents of Pacific Islands countries requiring time-critical medical treatment in New Zealand that they can't receive at home; and those facing risks to their health and safety overseas.

=== 6 April ===
- New Zealand Prime Minister Jacinda Ardern and COVID-19 Response Minister Chris Hipkins announced that a quarantine-free travel bubble between New Zealand and Australia would come into force at 11:59 pm on 18 April 2021. To be eligible for quarantine-free travel, people must have tested negative for COVID-19 in the preceding 14-day period.

=== 7 April ===
- New Zealand Prime Minister Jacinda Ardern has announced that New Zealand will temporarily ban travelers from India from entering the country between 4pm on 11 April (Sunday) and 28 April due to rising cases in that country. This temporary travel ban will also New Zealand citizens and residents traveling from India.

=== 16 April ===
- New Zealand Prime Minister Jacinda Ardern announced that New Zealand would donate 1.6 million COVID-19 vaccine doses through an international vaccine sharing programme. This quantity will be enough to vaccinate 800,000 people, many of whom will be health workers and vulnerable people in the Pacific Islands.

=== 19 April ===
- Fiji has imposed a lockdown on the cities of Lautoka and Nadi after a 53-year old woman was confirmed as the country's first community transmission in 12 months.

=== 20 April ===
- Fiji has launched a massive house-to-house screening program in the island state's western towns following concerns that hundreds of people may have contracted COVID-19 at a funeral.

=== 23 April ===
- New Zealand COVID-19 Response Minister Chris Hipkins has announced that travel from "high risk countries" including India, Brazil, Pakistan, and Papua New Guinea will be limited to New Zealand citizens and their immediate family from 11:59 pm on 28 April.
- The Western Australian capital of Perth and the nearby Peel region has entered a three day lockdown from midnight after several cases of COVID-19 transmission inside quarantine hotels. Anzac Day services in the affected areas were cancelled.

=== 25 April ===
- The Fijian Government has designated Suva, Nausori and Lami as containment areas with restricted movement in place for two weeks after a case in Suva's Makoi suburb was discovered yesterday with no links to earlier cases.

=== 30 April ===
- On 30 April, Australian Minister for Health and Aged Care Greg Hunt issued a temporary emergency declaration banning Australian citizens and residents in India from entering Australia due to the surge in COVID-19 cases in India. Those who disobey will face fines and imprisonment. These measures come into effect on 3 May and remain in force until 15 May.

== See also ==
- Timeline of the COVID-19 pandemic in April 2021
- Responses to the COVID-19 pandemic
