= Rashidah Ismail =

Malaysian politician

- راسهيداه إسماعيل

Member of the Johor State Legislative Assembly for Pasir Raja
- In office 9 May 2018 – 11 July 2026
- Preceded by: Adham Baba (BN–UMNO)
- Succeeded by: Adham Baba (BN–UMNO)

Personal details
- Born: Rashidah binti Ismail
- Citizenship: Malaysian
- Party: UMNO
- Other political affiliations: Barisan Nasional
- Occupation: Politician

Rashidah binti Ismail is a Malaysian politician from UMNO. She has served as the Member of the Johor State Legislative Assembly for Pasir Raja since 2018.

== Politics ==
Rashidah has served as Vice Chief of Women's Wing of UMNO Tenggara division since 2018, Information Chief of Women's Wing of UMNO Tenggara division from 2008 to 2013. She was also the Chairman of Welfare Bureau of UMNO Tenggara division from 2013 to 2016.

== Election results ==
Johor State Legislative Assembly
Year	Constituency	Candidate	Votes	Pct.	Opponent(s)	Votes	Pct.	Ballots cast	Majority	Turnout
2018	N35 Pasir Raja	Rashidah Ismail (UMNO)	8,055	51.59%	Abrary Ramly (AMANAH)	6,208	39.76%	16,012	1,847	84.28%
2018	N35 Pasir Raja	Rashidah Ismail (UMNO)	8,055	51.59%	Bahrin Alias (PAS)	1,351	8.65%	16,012	1,847	84.28%
2022	N35 Pasir Raja	Rashidah Ismail (UMNO)	9,381	58.21%	Intan Jawahir (BERSATU)	4,493	27.88%	16,492	4,888	58.81%
2022	N35 Pasir Raja	Rashidah Ismail (UMNO)	9,381	58.21%	Fakhruddin Moslim (PKR)	1,976	12.26%	16,492	4,888	58.81%
2022	N35 Pasir Raja	Rashidah Ismail (UMNO)	9,381	58.21%	Mohd Yusri Yusof (PEJUANG)	265	1.64%	16,492	4,888	58.81%
