= Kota Tinggi (federal constituency) =

Federal constituency in Johor, Malaysia

Kota Tinggi (P156)
Johor constituency

Federal constituency
- Legislature: Dewan Rakyat
- MP: Mohamed Khaled Nordin; BN
- Constituency created: 1984
- First contested: 1986
- Last contested: 2022

Demographics
- Population (2020): 57,377
- Electors (2026): 61,806
- Area (km²): 1,446
- Pop. density (per km²): 39.7

Kota Tinggi is a federal constituency in Kota Tinggi District, Johor, Malaysia, that has been represented in the Dewan Rakyat since 1986.

The federal constituency was created in the 1984 redistribution and is mandated to return a single member to the Dewan Rakyat under the first past the post voting system.

== Demographics ==
Ethnic breakdown of Kota Tinggi's electorate as of 2022
1. Malay (90.1%)
2. Chinese (8.00%)
3. Indian (1.60%)
4. Other ethnicities (0.30%)

As of 2020, Kota Tinggi has a population of 57,377 people.

Age breakdown of Kota Tinggi's electorate as of 2022
1. 18-20 (5.06%)
2. 21-29 (18.3%)
3. 30-39 (26.3%)
4. 40-49 (19.2%)
5. 50-59 (11.9%)
6. 60-69 (10.9%)
7. 70-79 (6.64%)
8. 80-89 (1.44%)
9. above 90 (0.28%)
Gender breakdown of Kota Tinggi's electorate as of 2022
1. Male (50.2%)
2. Female (49.8%)

== History ==
=== Polling districts ===
According to the gazette issued on 2 July 2026, the Kota Tinggi constituency has a total of 30 polling districts.

State constituency	Polling districts	Code	Location
Sedili（N36）	Sungai Ara	156/36/01	SK FELCRA Sungai Ara
Sedili（N36）	Tunjuk Laut	156/36/02	SK Tunjuk Laut
Sedili（N36）	Tenggaroh Selatan	156/36/03	SK LKTP Tenggaroh Selatan
Sedili（N36）	Sedili Pantai	156/36/04	SK Seri Setia Jaya
Sedili（N36）	Sedili Besar	156/36/05	SK Sedili Besar
Sedili（N36）	Sedili Tengah	156/36/06	SK Gemut
Sedili（N36）	Sedili Darat	156/36/07	Dewan Seberguna Kg. Gemut
Sedili（N36）	Mawai	156/36/08	SK Mawai
Sedili（N36）	Aping Barat	156/36/09	SK Seri Aman
Sedili（N36）	Aping Timor	156/36/10	SK Bukit Mahkota
Sedili（N36）	Sedili Kechil	156/36/11	SK Sedili Kechil
Sedili（N36）	Bukit Easter	156/36/12	SMK Bandar Easter
Sedili（N36）	Wah Hah I	156/36/13	SK Bandar Easter
Sedili（N36）	Wah Hah II	156/36/14	SK (FELDA) Bukit Waha
Johor Lama（N37）	Lok Heng Barat	156/37/01	SK (FELDA) Lok Heng
Johor Lama（N37）	Lok Heng Timor	156/37/02	SK (FELDA) Lok Heng Selatan
Johor Lama（N37）	Lok Heng Selatan	156/37/03	SA Al-Anysar FELDA Lok Heng Selatan; SK (FELDA) Lok Heng Selatan
Johor Lama（N37）	Kota Kechil Timor	156/37/04	SJK (C) New Kota
Johor Lama（N37）	Kota Kechil Barat	156/37/05	SK Laksamana
Johor Lama（N37）	Bukit Kerajaan	156/37/06	SRA Bersepadu Kota Tinggi
Johor Lama（N37）	Jalan Mawai	156/37/07	SK Datuk Usman Awang
Johor Lama（N37）	Tembioh	156/37/08	Dewan Badminton Skt Sports, Kampung Tembioh
Johor Lama（N37）	Kampong Makam	156/37/09	Dewan Raya Kampung Makam; Gelanggang Sukan Pelbagai Guna Kg. Makam
Johor Lama（N37）	FELDA Pasak	156/37/10	SK Tun Dr Syed Nasir
Johor Lama（N37）	Air Tawar 3	156/37/11	SK Muzaffar Shah
Johor Lama（N37）	Air Tawar 2	156/37/12	SMK Air Tawar
Johor Lama（N37）	Panchor	156/37/13	SK Panchor
Johor Lama（N37）	Johor Lama	156/37/14	SK Johor Kampong
Johor Lama（N37）	Pekan Telok Sengat	156/37/15	SJK (C) Nan Ya
Johor Lama（N37）	Telok Sengat	156/37/16	SK Telok Sengat

=== Representation history ===
Members of Parliament for Kota Tinggi
Parliament	No	Years	Member	Party	Vote Share
Constituency created from Panti and Johor Bahru
7th	P128	1986–1990	Musa Hitam (موسى هيتم)	BN (UMNO)	33,891; 91.23%
8th	P128	1990–1995	Syed Hamid Albar (سيد حميد البر)	BN (UMNO)	36,504; 78.57%
9th	P139	1995–1999	Syed Hamid Albar (سيد حميد البر)	BN (UMNO)	36,776; 92.44%
10th	P139	1999–2004	Syed Hamid Albar (سيد حميد البر)	BN (UMNO)	37,906; 86.84%
11th	P156	2004–2008	Syed Hamid Albar (سيد حميد البر)	BN (UMNO)	Uncontested
12th	P156	2008–2013	Syed Hamid Albar (سيد حميد البر)	BN (UMNO)	22,682; 85.91%
13th	P156	2013–2018	Noor Ehsanuddin Mohd Harun Narrashid (نور إحسان الدين محمد هارون الرشيد)	BN (UMNO)	30,373; 83.97%
14th	P156	2018–2022	Halimah Mohd Sadique (حليمة محمد صادق)	BN (UMNO)	26,407; 69.14%
15th	P156	2022–present	Mohamed Khaled Nordin (محمد خالد نورالدين)	BN (UMNO)	25,410; 53.68%

=== State constituency ===
Parliamentary constituency	State constituency						
Parliamentary constituency	1954–59*	1959–1974	1974–1986	1986–1995	1995–2004	2004–2018	2018–present
Kota Tinggi						Johor Lama	
Kota Tinggi				Pengerang			
Kota Tinggi				Sedili			

=== Historical boundaries ===
State Constituency	Area			
State Constituency	1984	1994	2003	2018
Johor Lama			FELDA Air Tawar 2 & 3; FELDA Pasak; Johor Lama; Kampung Makam; Kota Tinggi	FELDA Air Tawar 2 & 3; FELDA Lok Heng; FELDA Pasak; Johor Lama; Kota Tinggi
Pengerang	Desaru; FELDA Air Tawar 1 - 5; Penawar; Pengerang; Tanjung Surat	Desaru; FELDA Air Tawar 4 & 5; Penawar; Pengerang; Tanjung Surat		
Sedili	Kampung Tersusun Mawai Baru; Kampung Sayang; Kota Tinggi; Panti; Taman Sri Saujana	FELDA Air Tawar 1 - 3; FELDA Waha; Johor Lama; Kampung Padang; Kampung Sayang; Sedili	FELDA Lok Heng; FELDA Waha; Kampung Sayang; Kampung Tersusun Mawai Baru; Sedili	FELDA Waha; Kampung Padang; Kampung Sayang; Kampung Tersusun Mawai Baru; Sedili

=== Current state assembly members ===
No.	State Constituency	Member	Coalition (Party)
N36	Sedili	Muszaide Makmor	BN (UMNO)
N37	Johor Lama	Norlizah Noh	BN (UMNO)

=== Local governments & postcodes ===
No.	State Constituency	Local Government	Postcode
N36	Sedili	Kota Tinggi District Council	81900 Kota Tinggi; 81920 Ayer Tawar; 81930 Bandar Penawar
N37	Johor Lama	Pengerang Municipal Council (Teluk Sengat area); Kota Tinggi District Council	81900 Kota Tinggi; 81920 Ayer Tawar; 81930 Bandar Penawar

== Election results ==
Malaysian general election, 2022
Party	Candidate	Votes	%	∆%
BN	Mohamed Khaled Nordin	25,410	53.68	▼15.46
PN	Mohamad Ridhwan Rasman	17,020	35.96	▲35.96
PH	Onn Jaafar	4,903	10.36	▲10.36
Total valid votes		47,333	100.00	
Total rejected ballots		478		
Unreturned ballots		318		
Turnout		48,129	77.23	▼7.22
Registered electors		61,291		
Majority		8,390	17.72	▼20.56
BN hold		Swing		
Source(s) https://lom.agc.gov.my/ilims/upload/portal/akta/outputp/1753254/PUB%20617%20PARLIMEN%20JOHOR.pdf

Malaysian general election, 2018
Party	Candidate	Votes	%	∆%
BN	Halimah Mohd Sadique	26,407	69.14	▼14.83
PKR	Azlinda Abdul Latif	11,786	30.86	▲30.86
Total valid votes		38,193	100.00	
Total rejected ballots		802		
Unreturned ballots		423		
Turnout		39,418	84.45	▼3.73
Registered electors		46,677		
Majority		14,621	38.28	▼29.66
BN hold		Swing		
Source(s) "His Majesty's Government Gazette - Notice of Contested Election, Parliament for the State of Johore [P.U. (B) 244/2018]" (PDF). Attorney General's Chambers of Malaysia. 3 May 2018. Archived from the original (PDF) on 2019-12-29. "Federal Government Gazette - Results of Contested Election and Statements of the Poll after the Official Addition of Votes, Parliamentary Constituencies for the State of Johore [P.U. (B) 318/2018]" (PDF). Attorney General's Chambers of Malaysia. 28 May 2018.

Malaysian general election, 2013
Party	Candidate	Votes	%	∆%
BN	Noor Ehsanuddin Mohd Harun Narrashid	30,373	83.97	▼1.94
PAS	Onn Jaafar	5,799	16.03	▲1.94
Total valid votes		36,172	100.00	
Total rejected ballots		696		
Unreturned ballots		75		
Turnout		36,943	88.18	▲8.89
Registered electors		41,894		
Majority		24,574	67.94	▼3.88
BN hold		Swing		
Source(s) "Federal Government Gazette - Notice of Contested Election, Parliament for the State of Johore [P.U. (B) 181/2013]" (PDF). Attorney General's Chambers of Malaysia. 26 April 2013. "Federal Government Gazette - Results of Contested Election and Statements of the Poll after the Official Addition of Votes, Parliamentary Constituencies for the State of Johore [P.U. (B) 222/2013]" (PDF). Attorney General's Chambers of Malaysia. 22 May 2013.

Malaysian general election, 2008
Party	Candidate	Votes	%	∆%
BN	Syed Hamid Albar	22,682	85.91	▲85.91
PAS	Onn Jaafar	3,721	14.09	▲14.09
Total valid votes		26,403	100.00	
Total rejected ballots		653		
Unreturned ballots		53		
Turnout		27,109	79.29	
Registered electors		34,190		
Majority		18,961	71.82	
BN hold		Swing		

Malaysian general election, 2004
Party	Candidate	Votes	%	∆%
On the nomination day, Syed Hamid Albar won uncontested.
BN	Syed Hamid Albar			
Total valid votes			100.00	
Total rejected ballots				
Unreturned ballots				
Turnout				
Registered electors		33,262		
Majority				
BN hold		Swing		

Malaysian general election, 1999
Party	Candidate	Votes	%	∆%
BN	Syed Hamid Albar	37,906	86.84	▼5.60
PKR	Rosdin Abdul Rahman Mahmud	5,745	13.16	▲13.16
Total valid votes		43,651	100.00	
Total rejected ballots		1,187		
Unreturned ballots		156		
Turnout		44,994	78.15	▼0.68
Registered electors		57,571		
Majority		32,161	73.68	▼11.20
BN hold		Swing		

Malaysian general election, 1995
Party	Candidate	Votes	%	∆%
BN	Syed Hamid Albar	36,776	92.44	▲13.87
PAS	Mohamed Hanipa Maidin	3,007	7.56	▲7.56
Total valid votes		39,783	100.00	
Total rejected ballots		1,733		
Unreturned ballots		61		
Turnout		41,577	78.83	▼0.59
Registered electors		52,742		
Majority		33,769	84.88	▲27.74
BN hold		Swing		

Malaysian general election, 1990
Party	Candidate	Votes	%	∆%
BN	Syed Hamid Albar	36,504	78.57	▼12.66
S46	Ma'on Omar	9,956	21.43	▲21.43
Total valid votes		46,460	100.00	
Total rejected ballots		1,613		
Unreturned ballots				
Turnout		48,073	79.42	▲2.88
Registered electors		60,530		
Majority		26,548	57.14	▼25.32
BN hold		Swing		

Malaysian general election, 1986
Party	Candidate	Votes	%
BN	Musa Hitam	33,891	91.23
PAS	Harun Embong	3,258	8.77
Total valid votes		37,149	100.00
Total rejected ballots		1,307	
Unreturned ballots			
Turnout		38,456	76.54
Registered electors		50,240	
Majority		30,633	82.46
This was a new constituency created.
