= Noor Ehsanuddin Mohd Harun Narrashid =

Malaysian politician and businessman

Yang Berbahagia Datuk Noor Ehsanuddin Mohd Harun Narrashid DPSM
- نور إحسان الدين محمد هارون الرشيد

Member of the Malaysian Parliament for Kota Tinggi
- In office 5 May 2013 – 9 May 2018
- Preceded by: Syed Hamid Albar (BN–UMNO)
- Succeeded by: Halimah Mohd Sadique (BN–UMNO)
- Majority: 24,574 (2013)

Personal details
- Born: Noor Ehsanuddin bin Mohd Harun Narrashid
- Citizenship: Malaysian
- Party: United Malay National Organisation (UMNO)
- Other political affiliations: Barisan Nasional (BN); Perikatan Nasional (PN); Muafakat Nasional (MN)
- Children: 4
- Education: Southern Illinois University
- Occupation: Politician

Datuk Noor Ehsanuddin bin Mohd Harun Narrashid is a controversial Malaysian politician and businessman. He was the Member of Parliament of Kota Tinggi for one term from 2013 to 2018. He was also the Communication Director for Federal Land Development Authority (FELDA) under the Prime Minister's Department, former Director of Felda Investment Corporation (FIC) and formerly a board member of Felda Global Ventures Holdings (FGV). He is a member of the United Malays National Organisation (UMNO), a component party in Malaysia's former ruling Barisan Nasional (BN) coalition.

== Personal life ==
Noor Ehsanuddin is married and has four children.

=== Education ===
Noor Ehsanuddin received his primary education in Sekolah Rendah Inggeris Jalan Mersing – Kluang (1970–1974) and his secondary education in Masjid Tanah English School (1974–1975). He later was accepted to a boarding school MARA Junior Science College in Seremban, Negeri Sembilan, Malaysia. After the completion of his Malaysian Certificate of Education, he went to the United States of America to study in Southern Illinois University, Carbondale, USA (Civil Engineering And Mechanics).

== Career ==
=== Community and Association ===
Noor Ehsanuddin is an active member of social groups, community and association. In the 80's during his stay in America he was the chairman for the education bureau of UMNO Carbondale Club. Now, he also leads many association such as Pertubuhan Penggiat Kompang FELDA Kebangsaan, Konvensyen Gabungan Pemikir Professional FELDA (GAPROF) 2011 dan Karnival IKTIRAF (Ikatan Hati Warga FELDA) 2011/2012.

=== Candidacy for the 13th General Election 2013 ===
Noor Ehsanuddin was chosen by UMNO as the Barisan Nasional candidate for the parliamentary seat of Kota Tinggi, Johor in the 2013 general elections. He was elected as a Member of Parliament for one term from 2013 to 2018. He was dropped and did not seek reelection for his parliamentary seat in the 2018 general elections.

== Controversies ==
On 10 February 2019 Noor Ehsanuddin was charged by Malaysian Anti-Corruption Commission (MACC) for two counts of bribery by for accepting RM50,000 from printing company Karya Hidayah Sdn Bhd in 2013 and a plot of land said to be valued at RM180,000 from the same company in 2014, at the Kota Tinggi Land Office. On 13 February 2019 Noor Ehsanuddin was charged by MACC again for another fourteen counts of receiving bribes also from the same printing company by way of payment for his BMW 3 Series car monthly instalments between 2014 and 2015, totaling RM23,540.68. He was charged once again on the 14 February 2019 with five more counts of bribery in the form of maintenance for two vehicles, as well as the legal fee for purchase land totalling RM12,707.60, bringing the total graft charges against him to 21 in his capacity as a former Felda board member from the same printing company.

== Election results ==
Parliament of Malaysia
Year	Constituency	Candidate	Votes	Pct	Opponent(s)	Votes	Pct	Ballots cast	Majority	Turnout
2013	P156 Kota Tinggi	Noor Ehsanuddin Mohd Harun Narrashid (UMNO)	30,373	83.97%	Onn Jaafar (PAS)	5,799	16.03%	36,943	24,574	88.18%

== Honours ==
- Malacca
  - Companion Class II of the Exalted Order of Malacca (DPSM) – Datuk (2011)

== See also ==
- Kota Tinggi (federal constituency)
