= Tenggara (federal constituency) =

Federal constituency in Johor, Malaysia

Tenggara (P155)
Johor constituency

Federal constituency
- Legislature: Dewan Rakyat
- MP: Manndzri Nasib; BN
- Constituency created: 1994
- First contested: 1995
- Last contested: 2022

Demographics
- Population (2020): 94,174
- Electors (2026): 71,225
- Area (km²): 1,152
- Pop. density (per km²): 81.7

Tenggara is a federal constituency in Kota Tinggi District, Johor, Malaysia, that has been represented in the Dewan Rakyat since 1995.

The federal constituency was created in the 1994 redistribution and is mandated to return a single member to the Dewan Rakyat under the first past the post voting system.

== Demographics ==
Ethnic breakdown of Tenggara's electorate as of 2022
1. Malay (75.5%)
2. Chinese (16.4%)
3. Indian (6.60%)
4. Other ethnicities (1.50%)

As of 2020, Tenggara has a population of 94,174 people.

Age breakdown of Tenggara's electorate as of 2022
1. 18-20 (7.48%)
2. 21-29 (24.1%)
3. 30-39 (23.3%)
4. 40-49 (17.8%)
5. 50-59 (13.2%)
6. 60-69 (8.44%)
7. 70-79 (4.19%)
8. 80-89 (1.32%)
9. above 90 (0.16%)
Gender breakdown of Tenggara's electorate as of 2022
1. Male (49.9%)
2. Female (50.1%)

== History ==
=== Polling districts ===
According to the gazette issued on 2 July 2026, the Tenggara constituency has a total of 26 polling districts.

State constituency	Polling districts	Code	Location
Panti（N34）	Bandar Tenggara Utara	155/34/01	SK Bandar Tenggara 1
Panti（N34）	FELDA Pengeli Timor	155/34/02	SK FELDA Pengeli Timor
Panti（N34）	Sungai Sibol	155/34/03	SK FELDA Sungai Sibol
Panti（N34）	Linggiu	155/34/04	SK (FELDA) Linggiu
Panti（N34）	Ulu Sungai Johor	155/34/05	SK Semanggar
Panti（N34）	Pelepah Valley	155/34/06	Dewan Seri Teratai
Panti（N34）	Bukit Lintang	155/34/07	SK Bukit Lintang
Panti（N34）	Kampong Lukut	155/34/08	Dewan Semerah Padi Kampung Lukut Kota Tinggi; Balai Aktiviti Komuniti Kg. Lukut
Panti（N34）	Kota Tinggi Utara	155/34/09	SMK Bandar; SMK Taman Kota Jaya
Panti（N34）	Bandar Tenggara Selatan	155/34/10	SK Bandar Tenggara 2
Panti（N34）	Kampong Kelantan	155/34/11	SJK (C) Pei Hwa
Panti（N34）	Kota Jaya Utara	155/34/12	SMK Taman Kota Jaya; SA Taman Kota Jaya; SMA (Arab) Kota Tinggi
Panti（N34）	Kota Jaya Selatan	155/34/13	SK Taman Kota Jaya; SA Taman Kota Jaya
Pasir Raja (N35)	FELDA Sungai Sayong	155/35/01	SK LKTP Sungai Sayong
Pasir Raja (N35)	FELDA Bukit Besar	155/35/02	SK LKTP Bukit Besar
Pasir Raja (N35)	FELDA Pasir Raja	155/35/03	SK LKTP Pasir Raja
Pasir Raja (N35)	FELDA Bukit Ramun	155/35/04	SK LKTP Bukit Ramun
Pasir Raja (N35)	Sungai Telor	155/35/05	Balai Raya Kg. Baru Sg. Telor; Dewan Terbuka Kg. Baru Sg. Telor
Pasir Raja (N35)	Sungai Johor	155/35/06	SK Sungai Telor
Pasir Raja (N35)	Sungai Kemang Selatan	155/35/07	SK Bandar
Pasir Raja (N35)	Jalan Besar	155/35/08	SK Bandar
Pasir Raja (N35)	Jalan Johor	155/35/09	SMK Laksamana
Pasir Raja (N35)	Kota Tinggi Selatan	155/35/10	SJK (T) Jalan Tajul
Pasir Raja (N35)	Ladang R.E.M.	155/35/11	SJK (T) Ladang Rem
Pasir Raja (N35)	Jalan Kota Tinggi	155/35/12	SA Taman Seri Saujana 1; SK Seri Saujana
Pasir Raja (N35)	Kampung Baru Sungai Redan	155/35/13	Balai Aktiviti Komuniti Kg. Baru Sg. Redan

=== Representation history ===
Members of Parliament for Tenggara
Parliament	No	Years	Member	Party	Vote Share
Constituency created from Kota Tinggi, Kluang and Senai
9th	P136	1995–1999	Hishammuddin Hussein (هشام الدين حسين)	BN (UMNO)	28,727; 87.22%
10th	P136	1999–2004	Hishammuddin Hussein (هشام الدين حسين)	BN (UMNO)	28,376; 78.96%
11th	P155	2004–2008	Adham Baba (أدهم بابا)	BN (UMNO)	19,706; 88.27%
12th	P155	2008–2013	Halimah Mohamed Sadique (حليمة محمد صادق)	BN (UMNO)	19,031; 79.25%
13th	P155	2013–2018	Halimah Mohamed Sadique (حليمة محمد صادق)	BN (UMNO)	25,698; 75.14%
14th	P155	2018–2022	Adham Baba (أدهم بابا)	BN (UMNO)	20,142; 54.39%
15th	P155	2022–present	Manndzri Nasib (مننذري نصيب)	BN (UMNO)	21,185; 41.26%

=== State constituency ===
Parliamentary constituency	State constituency						
Parliamentary constituency	1954–59*	1959–1974	1974–1986	1986–1995	1995–2004	2004–2018	2018–present
Tenggara					Gunung Lambak		
Tenggara					Panti		
Tenggara						Pasir Raja	

=== Historical boundaries ===
State Constituency	Area		
State Constituency	1994	2003	2018
Gunung Lambak	Bandar Tenggara; FELDA Petri Jaya; FELDA Ulu Dengar; Gunung Lambak; Kampung Dato Abdul Rahman Yassin		
Panti	FELDA Aping Barat; Kampung Tersusun Mawai Baru; Kota Tinggi; Perani; Taman Sri Saujana	Bandar Tenggara; FELDA Pengeli Timor; FELDA Sungai Sibol; Kampung Lukut; Taman Kota Jaya	
Pasir Raja		FELDA Bukit Besar; FELDA Bukit Ramun; FELDA Pasir Raja; FELDA Sungai Sayong; Sungai Telor	

=== Current state assembly members ===
No.	State Constituency	Member	Coalition (Party)
N34	Panti	Muhammad Naqib Md Ghazali	BN (UMNO)
N35	Pasir Raja	Adham Baba	BN (UMNO)

=== Local governments & postcodes ===
No.	State Constituency	Local Government	Postcode
N34	Panti	Kota Tinggi District Council	81000 Kulai; 81440 Bandar Tenggara; 81450 Gugusan Taib Andak; 81900 Kota Tinggi
N35	Pasir Raja	Kota Tinggi District Council	81000 Kulai; 81440 Bandar Tenggara; 81450 Gugusan Taib Andak; 81900 Kota Tinggi

== Election results ==
Malaysian general election, 2022
Party	Candidate	Votes	%	∆%
BN	Manndzri Nasib	21,185	41.26	▼13.13
PN	Mohd Nazri Mokhtar	18,194	35.43	▲35.43
PH	Zuraidah Zainab Mohd Zen	11,618	22.63	▲22.63
PEJUANG	M Azhar Palal	353	0.69	▲0.69
Total valid votes		51,350	100.00	
Total rejected ballots		446		
Unreturned ballots		201		
Turnout		51,997	76.31	▼8.20
Registered electors		67,294		
Majority		2,991	5.83	▼10.19
BN hold		Swing		
Source(s) https://lom.agc.gov.my/ilims/upload/portal/akta/outputp/1753254/PUB%20617%20PARLIMEN%20JOHOR.pdf

Malaysian general election, 2018
Party	Candidate	Votes	%	∆%
BN	Adham Baba	20,142	54.39	▼20.75
PKR	Norjepri Mohamed Jelani	14,209	38.37	▲38.37
PAS	Yuhanita Yunan	2,683	7.24	▼17.62
Total valid votes		37,034	100.00	
Total rejected ballots		664		
Unreturned ballots		120		
Turnout		37,818	84.51	▼3.53
Registered electors		44,749		
Majority		5,933	16.02	▼34.26
BN hold		Swing		
Source(s) "His Majesty's Government Gazette - Notice of Contested Election, Parliament for the State of Johore [P.U. (B) 244/2018]" (PDF). Attorney General's Chambers of Malaysia. 3 May 2018. Archived from the original (PDF) on 2019-12-29. "Federal Government Gazette - Results of Contested Election and Statements of the Poll after the Official Addition of Votes, Parliamentary Constituencies for the State of Johore [P.U. (B) 318/2018]" (PDF). Attorney General's Chambers of Malaysia. 28 May 2018.

Malaysian general election, 2013
Party	Candidate	Votes	%	∆%
BN	Halimah Mohamed Sadique	25,698	75.14	▼4.11
PAS	Muhamad Said Jonit	8,502	24.86	▲4.11
Total valid votes		34,200	100.00	
Total rejected ballots		676		
Unreturned ballots		70		
Turnout		34,946	88.04	▲8.21
Registered electors		39,694		
Majority		17,196	50.28	▼8.22
BN hold		Swing		
Source(s) "Federal Government Gazette - Notice of Contested Election, Parliament for the State of Johore [P.U. (B) 181/2013]" (PDF). Attorney General's Chambers of Malaysia. 26 April 2013. "Federal Government Gazette - Results of Contested Election and Statements of the Poll after the Official Addition of Votes, Parliamentary Constituencies for the State of Johore [P.U. (B) 222/2013]" (PDF). Attorney General's Chambers of Malaysia. 22 May 2013.

Malaysian general election, 2008
Party	Candidate	Votes	%	∆%
BN	Halimah Mohamed Sadique	19,031	79.25	▼9.02
PAS	Salleh Farmin	4,982	20.75	▲9.02
Total valid votes		24,013	100.00	
Total rejected ballots		1,336		
Unreturned ballots		435		
Turnout		25,784	79.83	▲2.51
Registered electors		32,297		
Majority		14,049	58.50	▼18.04
BN hold		Swing		

Malaysian general election, 2004
Party	Candidate	Votes	%	∆%
BN	Adham Baba	19,706	88.27	▲9.31
PAS	Salleh Farmin	2,618	11.73	▲11.73
Total valid votes		22,324	100.00	
Total rejected ballots		640		
Unreturned ballots		92		
Turnout		23,056	77.32	▲0.74
Registered electors		29,818		
Majority		17,088	76.54	▲18.62
BN hold		Swing		

Malaysian general election, 1999
Party	Candidate	Votes	%	∆%
BN	Hishammuddin Hussein	28,376	78.96	▼8.26
PKR	Lokman Noor Adam	7,559	21.04	▲21.04
Total valid votes		35,935	100.00	
Total rejected ballots		991		
Unreturned ballots		903		
Turnout		37,829	78.06	▲14.70
Registered electors		48,461		
Majority		20,817	57.92	▼16.52
BN hold		Swing		

Malaysian general election, 1995
Party	Candidate	Votes	%
BN	Hishammuddin Hussein	28,727	87.22
S46	Madin Khani @ Md. Din A. Ghani	4,209	12.78
Total valid votes		32,936	100.00
Total rejected ballots		1,536	
Unreturned ballots		310	
Turnout		34,782	63.36
Registered electors		54,895	
Majority		24,518	74.44
This was a new constituency created.
