= Rasman Ithnain =

Malaysian politician

Haji Rasman Ithnain JSM
- رسمان إثنين

Member of the Johor State Legislative Assembly for Sedili
- In office 2008 – 22 January 2022
- Preceded by: Abdul Rashid Abdul Mokti
- Succeeded by: Muszaide Makmor

Personal details
- Born: Rasman bin Ithnain
- Citizenship: Malaysian
- Party: UMNO (till 2018); BERSATU (since 2018)
- Other political affiliations: BN (till 2018); PH (2018-2020); PN (since 2020)
- Spouse: Zaleha Ali
- Children: Alias Rasman
- Occupation: Politician

Rasman bin Ithnain is a Malaysian politician from BERSATU. He was the Member of Johor State Legislative Assembly for Sedili from 2008 to 2022.

== Politics ==
On 12 May 2018, he quit UMNO and joined BERSATU together with Alwiyah Talib and Rosleli Jahari, and became the Chief of BERSATU Kota Tinggi Branch. He is also a member of the board of directors of FELDA.

== Controversies ==
=== Sexual harassment ===
On 13 January 2022, a woman, aged 26 and daughter of former BERSATU Srikandi Chief, had lodged a report that Rasman had sexually harassed her. Rasman denied the allegations and said that it was a political conspiracy to tarnish his reputation.

== Election results ==
Johor State Legislative Assembly
Year	Constituency	Candidate	Vote	Pct.	Opponent(s)	Vote	Pct.	Ballot cast	Majority	Turnout
2008	N36 Sedili	Rasman Ithnain (UMNO)	14,017	89.82%	Monaim Hassan (PAS)	1,259	8.07%	15,606	12,758	81.32%
2013	N36 Sedili	Rasman Ithnain (UMNO)	19,907	89.92%	Abdul Kadir Sainudin (PKR)	1,780	8.04%	22,139	18,127	89.60%
2018	N36 Sedili	Rasman Ithnain (UMNO)	13,407	73.82%	Abdul Razak Esa (PKR)	4,239	23.34%	18,162	9,168	84.65%

== Honours ==
- Malaysia
  - Companion of the Order of Loyalty to the Crown of Malaysia (JSM) (2021)
