= Rosleli Jahari =

Malaysian politician

Haji Rosleli Jahari KMN
- رسليلي جاهري

Member of the Johor State Legislative Assembly for Johor Lama
- In office 28 June 2018 – 22 January 2022
- Preceded by: Asiah Md Ariff
- Succeeded by: Norlizah Noh

Personal details
- Born: Rosleli bin Jahari
- Citizenship: Malaysian
- Party: UMNO (till 2018, since 2022); BERSATU (2018-2022)
- Other political affiliations: BN (till 2018, since 2022); PH (2018-2020); PN (2020-2022)
- Occupation: Politician

Rosleli bin Jahari is a Malaysian politician from UMNO. He is the Member of Johor State Legislative Assembly for Johor Lama since 2018.

== Politics ==
On 12 May 2018, he quitted UMNO and joined BERSATU. On 6 March 2022, before the Johor state election, he had quitted BERSATU and rejoined UMNO, and was not nominated to contest in the state election.

== Election results ==
Johor State Legislative Assembly
Year	Constituency	Candidate	Vote	Pct.	Opponent(s)	Votes	Pct.	Majority	Ballots cast
2018	N37 Johor Lama	Roslely Jahari (UMNO)	12,532	59.60%	Nor Ashidah Ibrahim (PKR)	6,725	31.98%	5,807	21,026
2018	N37 Johor Lama	Roslely Jahari (UMNO)	12,532	59.60%	Siti Zaharah Othman (PAS)	1,433	6.82%	5,807	21,026

== Honours ==
- Malaysia
  - Officer of the Order of the Defender of the Realm (KMN) (2016)
