= Asiah Md Ariff =

Malaysian politician

Asiah Md Ariff JSM KMN AMN PSI II
- آسية مد عارف

Johor Women Chief of the United Malays National Organisation
- Incumbent
- Assumed office 21 July 2018
- President: Ahmad Zahid Hamidi
- National Women Chief: Noraini Ahmad
- Vice Women Chief: Noriah Mahat (2018-2023); Norshida Ibrahim (since 2023)
- Preceded by: Sharifah Azizah Syed Zain

Johor State Executive Councillor (Rural Development, Regional, Arts, Culture and Heritage : 16 March 2008–13 May 2013) (Woman Development, Family and Community : 14 May 2013–12 May 2018)
- In office 16 March 2008 – 12 May 2018
- Monarchs: Iskandar; Ibrahim
- Menteri Besar: Abdul Ghani Othman; Mohamed Khaled Nordin
- Preceded by: Ahmad Zahri Jamil
- Succeeded by: Liow Cai Tung
- Constituency: Johor Lama

Member of the Johor State Legislative Assembly for Johor Lama
- In office 21 March 2004 – 9 May 2018
- Preceded by: Constituency Established
- Succeeded by: Rosleli Jahari (UMNO–BN)
- Majority: 9,051 (2004); 6,305 (2008); 7,022 (2013)

Member of the Johor State Legislative Assembly for Sedili
- In office 29 November 1999 – 21 March 2004
- Preceded by: Mohamadon Abu Bakar (UMNO–BN)
- Succeeded by: Abdul Rashid Abd. Mokti (UMNO–BN)
- Majority: 14,174 (1999)

Personal details
- Born: May 27, 1961 (age 65) Johor, Malaysia
- Citizenship: Malaysian
- Party: United Malays National Organisation (UMNO)
- Other political affiliations: Barisan Nasional (BN)
- Occupation: Politician

Asiah binti Md Ariff is a Malaysian politician and former Johor State Executive Councillor.

== Election results ==
Johor State Legislative Assembly
Year	Constituency	Candidate	Votes	Pct	Opponent(s)	Votes	Pct	Ballots cast	Majority	Turnout
1999	N29 Sedili	Asiah Md Ariff (UMNO)	17,481	84.09%	Abdullah Shahadan (PAS)	3,307	15.91%	21,549	14,174	77.30%
2004	N37 Johor Lama	Asiah Md Ariff (UMNO)	10,039	91.04%	Monaim Hassan (PAS)	988	8.96%	11,219	9,051	74.10%
2008	N37 Johor Lama	Asiah Md Ariff (UMNO)	8,668	78.58%	Kamaldin Tahir (PAS)	2,363	21.42%	11,259	6,305	75.06%
2013	N37 Johor Lama	Asiah Md Ariff (UMNO)	10,769	74.19%	Kamaldin Tahir (PAS)	3,747	25.81%	14,770	7,022	86.20%

== Honours ==
=== Honours of Malaysia ===
- Malaysia
  - Member of the Order of the Defender of the Realm (AMN) (2003)
  - Officer of the Order of the Defender of the Realm (KMN) (2015)
  - Companion of the Order of Loyalty to the Crown of Malaysia (JSM) (2022)
- Johor
  - Second Class of the Sultan Ibrahim of Johor Medal (PSI II) (2015)
