= Halimah Mohamed Sadique =

Malaysian politician

Yang Berbahagia Datuk Wira Halimah Mohamed Sadique PJN DCSM PIS
- حليمة محمد صادق

Minister of National Unity
- In office 30 August 2021 – 24 November 2022
- Monarch: Abdullah
- Prime Minister: Ismail Sabri Yaakob
- Deputy: Wan Ahmad Fayhsal
- Preceded by: Herself
- Succeeded by: Aaron Ago Dagang
- Constituency: Kota Tinggi
- In office 10 March 2020 – 16 August 2021
- Monarch: Abdullah
- Prime Minister: Muhyiddin Yassin
- Deputy: Ti Lian Ker
- Preceded by: Waytha Moorthy Ponnusamy (Minister in Prime Minister's Department (National Unity and Social Wellbeing))
- Succeeded by: Herself
- Constituency: Kota Tinggi

Deputy Minister of Urban Wellbeing, Housing, and Local Government
- In office 16 May 2013 – 9 May 2018
- Monarchs: Abdul Halim (2013-2016); Muhammad V (2016-2018)
- Prime Minister: Najib Razak
- Minister: Abdul Rahman Dahlan (2013–2016); Noh Omar (2016–2018)
- Preceded by: Lajim Ukin (Housing and Local Government); Saravanan Murugan (Urban Wellbeing)
- Succeeded by: Raja Kamarul Bahrin Shah Raja Ahmad (Housing and Local Government); Mohamed Farid Md Rafik (Social Wellbeing)
- Constituency: Tenggara

Member of the Malaysian Parliament for Kota Tinggi
- In office 9 May 2018 – 19 November 2022
- Preceded by: Noor Ehsanuddin Mohd Harun Narrashid (BN–UMNO)
- Succeeded by: Mohamed Khaled Nordin (BN–UMNO)
- Majority: 14,621 (2018)

Member of the Malaysian Parliament for Tenggara
- In office 8 March 2008 – 9 May 2018
- Preceded by: Adham Baba (BN–UMNO)
- Succeeded by: Adham Baba (BN–UMNO)
- Majority: 14,049 (2008); 17,196 (2013)

Member of the Johor State Legislative Assembly for Pasir Raja
- In office 21 March 2004 – 8 March 2008
- Preceded by: Position established
- Succeeded by: Adham Baba (BN–UMNO)
- Majority: 8,965 (2004)

Member of the Johor State Legislative Assembly for Gunung Lambak
- In office 24 April 1995 – 21 March 2004
- Preceded by: Ng Kim Lai (BN–MCA)
- Succeeded by: Position abolished
- Majority: 14,630 (1995); 14,368 (1999)

Faction represented in Johor State Legislative Assembly
- 1995–2008: Barisan Nasional

Personal details
- Born: Halimah binti Mohamed Sadique; 2 February 1962 (age 64) Johor, Federation of Malaya (now Malaysia)
- Party: United Malays National Organisation (UMNO)
- Other political affiliations: Barisan Nasional (BN)
- Spouse: Suffian Othman
- Relations: Illi Najwa Saddique (niece)
- Occupation: Politician
- Halimah Mohamed Sadique on Facebook; Halimah Mohamed Sadique on Parliament of Malaysia

Halimah binti Mohamed Sadique (Jawi: حليمة بنت محمد صادق; born 2 February 1962) is a Malaysian politician who served as the Minister of National Unity for the second term in the Barisan Nasional (BN) administration under former Prime Minister Ismail Sabri Yaakob from August 2021 to the collapse of the BN administration in November 2022 and her first term in the Perikatan Nasional (PN) administration under former Prime Minister Muhyiddin Yassin from March 2020 to August 2021 as well as the Member of Parliament (MP) for Kota Tinggi from May 2018 to November 2022. She also served as Deputy Minister of Urban Wellbeing, Housing and Local Government in the BN administration under former Prime Minister Najib Razak and former Minister Abdul Rahman Dahlan from May 2013 to July 2015. She is a member of the United Malays National Organisation (UMNO), a component party of the BN administration.

== Political career ==
She served as the Deputy Minister of Urban Wellbeing, Housing, and Local Government in the Barisan Nasional (BN) administration under former Prime Minister Najib Razak and former Ministers Abdul Rahman Dahlan as well as Noh Omar from May 2013 to the collapse of the BN administration in May 2018, MP for Tenggara from March 2008 to May 2018, Member of the Johor State Legislative Assembly (MLA) for Pasir Raja from March 2004 to March 2008 and MLA for Gunung Lambak from April 1995 to March 2004. She is also a member of the United Malay National Organisation (UMNO), a component party of the BN coalition which is aligned with the PN coalition.

Halimah was elected to federal Parliament in the 2008 general elections, having previously served in the State Assembly of Johor and on the Johor State Executive Council. She was re-elected in the 2013 election and appointed as Deputy Minister of Urban Wellbeing, Housing, and Local Government in the Cabinet of Prime Minister Najib Razak.

Halimah contested and won the Kota Tinggi parliamentary in the 2018 general elections instead, but BN had lost power in recapturing the federal government to the Pakatan Harapan (PH) coalition, only to regain power in 2020.

== Health ==
In January 2021, Halimah tested positive for COVID-19.

== Election results ==
Johor State Legislative Assembly
Year	Constituency	Candidate	Votes	Pct	Opponent(s)	Votes	Pct	Ballots cast	Majority	Turnout
1995	N24 Gunung Lambak	Halimah Mohamed Sadique (UMNO)	18,048	81.36%	Zainal Abidin Hj Ibrahim (S46)	3,418	15.41%	22,183	14,630	78.89%
1999	N24 Gunung Lambak	Halimah Mohamed Sadique (UMNO)	19,348	76.47%	Salleh Farmin (PAS)	4,980	19.68%	25,300	14,368	79.48%
2004	N35 Pasir Raja	Halimah Mohamed Sadique (UMNO)	10,402	85.24%	Sanip Ithnin (PAS)	1,437	11.78%	12,203	8,965	75.63%

Parliament of Malaysia
Year	Constituency	Candidate	Votes	Pct	Opponent(s)	Votes	Pct	Ballots cast	Majority	Turnout
2008	P155 Tenggara	Halimah Mohamed Sadique (UMNO)	19,031	79.25%	Salleh Farmin (PAS)	4,982	20.75%	25,784	14,049	79.83%
2013	P155 Tenggara	Halimah Mohamed Sadique (UMNO)	25,698	75.14%	Muhamad Said Jonit (PAS)	8,502	24.86%	34,946	17,196	88.04%
2018	P156 Kota Tinggi	Halimah Mohamed Sadique (UMNO)	26,407	69.14%	Azlinda Abd Latif (BERSATU)	11,786	30.86%	39,418	14,621	84.45%

== Honours ==
=== Honours of Malaysia ===
- Malaysia
  - Commander of the Order of Meritorious Service (PJN) – Datuk (2003)
- Malacca
  - Knight Commander of the Exalted Order of Malacca (DCSM) – Datuk Wira (2017)
