= Johor Lama (state constituency) =

Political subdivision in Malaysia

Johor Lama (N37)
Johor constituency

State constituency
- Legislature: Johor State Legislative Assembly
MLA
Norlizah Noh
BN
- Constituency created: 1959
- Constituency abolished: 1986
- Constituency re-created: 2003
- First contested: 1959
- Last contested: 2026

Demographics
- Population (2020): 29,869
- Electors (2026): 32,716
- Area (km²): 331

Johor Lama is a state constituency in Johor, Malaysia, that is represented in the Johor State Legislative Assembly.

The state constituency was first contested in 1959 and is mandated to return a single Assemblyman to the Johor State Legislative Assembly under the first-past-the-post voting system.

== Demographics ==
As of 2020, Johor Lama has a population of 29,869 people.

Ethnic breakdown of Johor Lama's electorate as of 2026
1. Malay (83.4%)
2. Chinese (12.8%)
3. Indians (2.40%)
4. Other ethnicities (1.30%)

== History ==
=== Polling districts ===
According to the gazette issued on 2 July 2026, the Johor Lama constituency has a total of 16 polling districts.

State constituency	Polling districts	Code	Location
Johor Lama（N37）	Lok Heng Barat	156/37/01	SK (FELDA) Lok Heng
Johor Lama（N37）	Lok Heng Timor	156/37/02	SK (FELDA) Lok Heng Selatan
Johor Lama（N37）	Lok Heng Selatan	156/37/03	SA Al-Anysar FELDA Lok Heng Selatan; SK (FELDA) Lok Heng Selatan
Johor Lama（N37）	Kota Kechil Timor	156/37/04	SJK (C) New Kota
Johor Lama（N37）	Kota Kechil Barat	156/37/05	SK Laksamana
Johor Lama（N37）	Bukit Kerajaan	156/37/06	SRA Bersepadu Kota Tinggi
Johor Lama（N37）	Jalan Mawai	156/37/07	SK Datuk Usman Awang
Johor Lama（N37）	Tembioh	156/37/08	Dewan Badminton Skt Sports, Kampung Tembioh
Johor Lama（N37）	Kampong Makam	156/37/09	Dewan Raya Kampung Makam; Gelanggang Sukan Pelbagai Guna Kg. Makam
Johor Lama（N37）	FELDA Pasak	156/37/10	SK Tun Dr Syed Nasir
Johor Lama（N37）	Air Tawar 3	156/37/11	SK Muzaffar Shah
Johor Lama（N37）	Air Tawar 2	156/37/12	SMK Air Tawar
Johor Lama（N37）	Panchor	156/37/13	SK Panchor
Johor Lama（N37）	Johor Lama	156/37/14	SK Johor Kampong
Johor Lama（N37）	Pekan Telok Sengat	156/37/15	SJK (C) Nan Ya
Johor Lama（N37）	Telok Sengat	156/37/16	SK Telok Sengat

=== Representation history ===
Members of the Legislative Assembly for Johor Lama
Assembly	No	Years	Name	Party
Constituency created
Johore Lama
1st	N16	1959-1964	Lee Yeak Khim	Alliance (MCA)
2nd	N16	1964-1969	Ismail Sa'adon	Alliance (UMNO)
		1969-1971	Assembly dissolved	
3rd	N16	1969-1973	Ismail Sa'adon	Alliance (UMNO)
3rd	N16	1973-1974	Mohamed Yusoff Jani	Alliance (UMNO)
4th	N20	1974-1978	Mohamed Yusoff Jani	BN (UMNO)
5th	N20	1978-1982	Sema'on @ Ma'on Omar	BN (UMNO)
6th	N20	1982-1986	Atasha Majid	BN (UMNO)
Constituency abolished, split into Sedili and Pengerang
Constituency recreated from Sedili and Pengerang
Johor Lama
11th	N37	2004-2008	Asiah Md Ariff	BN (UMNO)
12th	N37	2008-2013	Asiah Md Ariff	BN (UMNO)
13th	N37	2013-2018	Asiah Md Ariff	BN (UMNO)
14th	N37	2018	Rosleli Jahari	BN (UMNO)
14th	N37	2018-2020	Rosleli Jahari	PH (BERSATU)
14th	N37	2020-2022	Rosleli Jahari	PN (BERSATU)
15th	N37	2022–2026	Norlizah Noh	BN (UMNO)
16th	N37	2026–present	Norlizah Noh	BN (UMNO)

== Election results ==
Johor state election, 2026
Party	Candidate	Votes	%	∆%
BN	Norlizah Noh	19,038	79.89	▲19.33
PH	Danish Hossman Abd Rahman	2,694	11.31	▲3.71
PN	Aisah Esa	2,097	8.80	▼21.71
Total valid votes		23,829	100.00	
Total rejected ballots		274		
Unreturned ballots		23		
Turnout		24,126	73.74	▲11.14
Registered electors		32,716		
Majority		16,344	68.59	▲38.54
BN hold		Swing		

Johor state election, 2022
Party	Candidate	Votes	%	∆%
BN	Norlizah Noh	12,171	60.56	▼0.01
PN	Alias Rasman	6,132	30.51	▲30.51
PH	Omar Mokhtar	1,527	7.60	▲7.60
PEJUANG	Mohd Shukor Ahmad	268	1.33	▲1.33
Total valid votes		20,098	100.00	
Total rejected ballots		273		
Unreturned ballots		73		
Turnout		20,444	62.60	▼21.68
Registered electors		32,658		
Majority		6,039	30.05	▲1.98
BN hold		Swing		

Johor state election, 2018
Party	Candidate	Votes	%	∆%
BN	Rosleli Jahari	12,532	60.57	▼13.62
PKR	Nor Ashidah Ibrahim	6,725	32.50	▲32.50
PAS	Siti Zaharah Othman	1,433	6.93	▼18.89
Total valid votes		20,690	100.00	
Total rejected ballots		336		
Unreturned ballots		230		
Turnout		21,256	84.28	▼1.90
Registered electors		25,221		
Majority		5,807	28.07	▼20.31
BN hold		Swing		

Johor state election, 2013
Party	Candidate	Votes	%	∆%
BN	Asiah Md. Ariff	10,769	74.19	▼4.39
PAS	Kamaldin Tahir	3,747	25.81	▲4.39
Total valid votes		14,516	100.00	
Total rejected ballots		254		
Unreturned ballots		34		
Turnout		14,804	86.18	▲11.12
Registered electors		17,178		
Majority		7,022	48.37	▼8.78
BN hold		Swing		

Johor state election, 2008
Party	Candidate	Votes	%	∆%
BN	Asiah Md. Ariff	8,668	78.58	▼12.46
PAS	Kamaldin Tahir	2,363	21.42	▲12.46
Total valid votes		11,031	100.00	
Total rejected ballots		228		
Unreturned ballots		0		
Turnout		11,259	75.06	▲0.96
Registered electors		15,000		
Majority		6,305	57.16	▼24.92
BN hold		Swing		

Johor state election, 2004
Party	Candidate	Votes	%	∆%
BN	Asiah Md. Ariff	10,039	91.04	
PAS	Mona'Im Hassan	988	8.96	
Total valid votes		11,027	100.00	
Total rejected ballots		192		
Unreturned ballots		39		
Turnout		11,258	74.10	
Registered electors		15,192		
Majority		9,051	82.08	
BN hold		Swing		

Johor state election, 1982
Party	Candidate	Votes	%	∆%
On the nomination day, Atasha Majid won uncontested.
BN	Atasha Majid			
Total valid votes				
Total rejected ballots				
Unreturned ballots				
Turnout				
Registered electors		28,777		
Majority				
BN hold		Swing		

Johor state election, 1978
Party	Candidate	Votes	%	∆%
BN	Ma'On Omar	11,277	83.79	
Independent	Husein Ismail	1,199	8.91	
PAS	Syed Yahya Ibrahim	982	7.30	
Total valid votes		13,458	100.00	
Total rejected ballots		825		
Unreturned ballots		0		
Turnout		14,283	81.05	▲81.05
Registered electors		17,622		
Majority		10,078	74.88	▲74.88
BN hold		Swing		

Johor state election, 1974
Party	Candidate	Votes	%	∆%
On the nomination day, Yusof Malim Kuning won uncontested.
BN	Yusof Malim Kuning			
Total valid votes				
Total rejected ballots				
Unreturned ballots				
Turnout				
Registered electors		11,055		
Majority				
BN gain from Alliance		Swing		-

Johor state election, 1969: Johore Lama
Party	Candidate	Votes	%	∆%
Alliance	Ismail Sa'adon	3,026	70.62	
GERAKAN	Tunku Mohamed Archibald Tunku Ahmad	1,259	29.38	
Total valid votes		4,285	100.00	
Total rejected ballots		465		
Unreturned ballots		0		
Turnout		4,750	83.11	▲83.11
Registered electors		5,715		
Majority		1,767	41.24	▲41.24
Alliance hold		Swing		

Johor state election, 1964: Johore Lama
Party	Candidate	Votes	%	∆%
On the nomination day, Ismail Sa'adon won uncontested.
Alliance	Ismail Sa'adon			
Total valid votes				
Total rejected ballots				
Unreturned ballots				
Turnout				
Registered electors		6,352		
Majority				
Alliance hold		Swing		

Johor state election, 1959: Johore Lama
Party	Candidate	Votes	%
Alliance	Lee Yeak Khim	2,722	69.97
National Party	Syed Abu Bakar Jaafar	1,168	30.03
Total valid votes		3,890	100.00
Total rejected ballots		94	
Unreturned ballots		0	
Turnout		3,984	73.18
Registered electors		5,444	
Majority		1,554	39.95
This was a new constituency created.
