= Asia e University =

Distance learning university in Malaysia

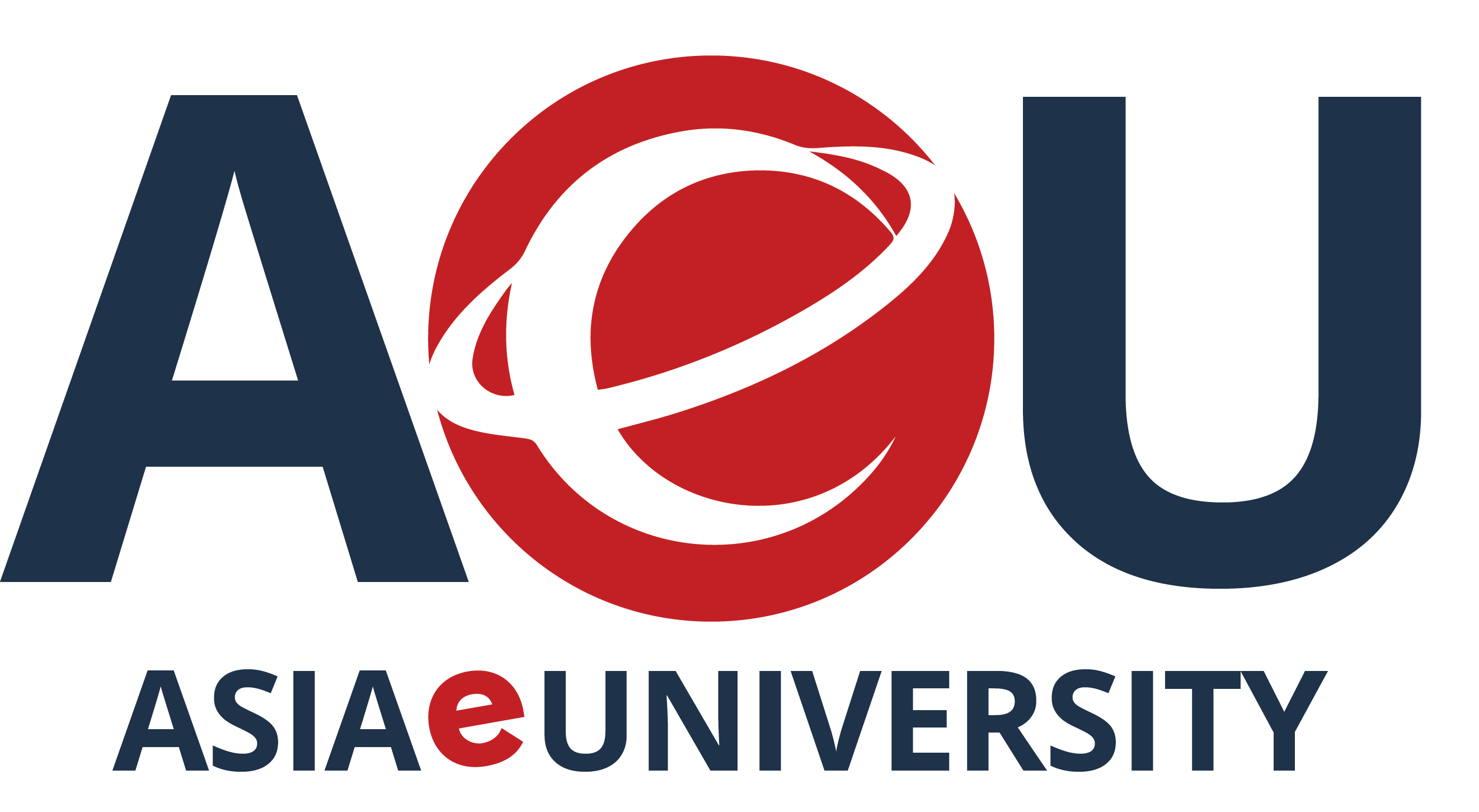
- Motto: 1 University 34 Countries
- Type: Non-Profit Private
- Established: 2007
- Affiliations: ACU, AAOU, ICDE, EFQUEL, ICTLC
- Chancellor: Syed Hamid Albar
- Students: 29,000 (on-campus, blended & online)
- Location: Wisma Subang Jaya, No.106, Jalan ss15/4 Subang Jaya, 47500 Selangor, Malaysia
- Colours: Blue, and Red
- Website: aeu.edu.my

Asia e University (AeU) is a private university in Subang Jaya, Selangor, Malaysia that offers on-campus, blended and online learning mode programmes. An institution set in Asia, by Asians, and for Asia – founded by the Asia Cooperation Dialogue foreign ministers. Asia Cooperation Dialogue is represented by the foreign ministers of 34 Asia Pacific countries, and it aims to promote cooperation in areas like education, through projects such as Asia e University at the Islamabad 2005 and Doha 2006 Asia Cooperation Dialogue ministerial meetings.

The university is a member of the Association of Commonwealth Universities and other international higher educational organizations. The main campus is situated in Kuala Lumpur, with learning centres in most of the states of Malaysia, as well as in other countries. AeU has a network of locations to deliver undergraduate, postgraduate and executive development programmes and the foundation programmes in partnership with University of London.

== Notable alumni ==
- Tan Sri Datuk Seri Dr Syed Hamid Albar, Doctor of Philosophy (Business Administration) 2014, Former Minister of Home Affairs Malaysia and Chancellor of the Asia e University.
- Datuk Dr Mary Yap Kain Ching, Doctor of Philosophy (Education) 2016, Former Deputy Minister of Higher Education Malaysia
- Dr David Richard Namwandi, Doctor of Philosophy (Business Administration) 2014, Former Minister of Education Namibia
- Dr Abdullah Rasheed Ahmed, Doctor of Philosophy (Education) 2016, Minister of State for Education Maldives
- Mafio Matthew Mlambo, Master of Business Administration (MBA) 2015, Former Minister from the Embassy of the Republic of Zimbabwe in Malaysia
- Dato' Seri Dr. Tengku Baderul Zaman Almarhum Sultan Mahmud Al-Muktafi Billah Shah, Doctor of Business Administration (DBA) 2024, Former Independent Non-Executive Chairman of Handal Energy Berhad
