= Manndzri Nasib =

Malaysian politician

Yang Berhormat Tuan Manndzri Nasib MP
- مننذري نصيب

Chairman of Rubber Industry Smallholders Development Authority
- Incumbent
- Assumed office 1 February 2024
- Preceded by: Noraini Ahmad

Member of the Malaysian Parliament for Tenggara
- Incumbent
- Assumed office 19 November 2022
- Preceded by: Adham Baba (BN—UMNO)
- Majority: 2,991 (2022)

Personal details
- Born: Manndzri bin Nasib; 1980 (age 45–46) Kota Tinggi, Johor, Malaysia
- Party: United Malays National Organisation (UMNO)
- Other political affiliations: Barisan Nasional (BN)
- Education: University of Science Malaysia (BBA)
- Occupation: Politician
- Manndzri Nasib on Facebook

Manndzri bin Nasib (Jawi: مننذري نصيب, Malay pronunciation: [manndzri]; born 1980) is a Malaysian politician, who is a member of the United Malays National Organisation (UMNO), a component party of the Barisan Nasional (BN) coalition. He has served as the Member of Parliament of Tenggara since November 2022.

On 1 February 2024, Manndzri was elected as the new Chairman of Rubber Industry Smallholders Development Authority (RISDA), succeeding Noraini Ahmad.

== Early life and education ==
Born and raised in Johor under a FELDA settlement, Manndzri studied in several schools in rural Johor such as SK Felda Pengeli Timur and SMK Bandar Tenggara in Kulai. He then continued his studies at the University of Science Malaysia in Pulau Pinang, where he graduated with a bachelor's degree in management, with a concentration in marketing.

== Early career ==
Before venturing into politics, Manndzri worked as a marketing executive at Tanjong Puteri Golf Resort and Air Pegasus LLC at Pasir Gudang. He then continued working under FELDA where he was eventually appointed under the Prime Minister's Office to hold several posts. Within the Prime Minister's Office, he was the chief assistant director in the Economic Planning Unit. Moreover, he was also the deputy strategic director within FELDA under the Prime Minister's Office.

== Political career ==
Manndzri is currently the deputy division chief of UMNO Tenggara. In the 2022 Malaysian general election, Manndzri was elected as a candidate for the Tenggara parliamentary seat, succeeding the former health minister Adham Baba, who was the incumbent division chief of UMNO Tenggara at that time.

== Election results ==
Parliament of Malaysia
Year	Constituency	Candidate	Votes	Pct	Opponent(s)	Votes	Pct	Ballots cast	Majority	Turnout
2022	P155 Tenggara	Manndzri Nasib (UMNO)	21,185	41.26%	Mohd Nazari Mokhtar (PAS)	18,194	35.43%	51,350	2,991	76.31%
2022	P155 Tenggara	Manndzri Nasib (UMNO)	21,185	41.26%	Zuraidah Chedah (PKR)	11,618	22.63%	51,350	2,991	76.31%
2022	P155 Tenggara	Manndzri Nasib (UMNO)	21,185	41.26%	Azhar Palal (PEJUANG)	353	0.69%	51,350	2,991	76.31%

== Honours ==
=== Honours of Malaysia ===
- Malaysia
  - Recipient of the 17th Yang di-Pertuan Agong Installation Medal (2024)
