= Norlizah Noh =

Malaysian politician

Yang Berhormat Cik Norlizah Noh MLA
- نورليزه نوح

Member of the Johor State Executive Council (Education, Information & Communication)
- In office 26 March 2022 – 13 February 2024
- Monarch: Ibrahim Iskandar
- Menteri Besar: Onn Hafiz Ghazi
- Succeeded by: Aznan Tamin (Education & Information); Mohamad Fazli Mohamad Salleh (Communication)
- Constituency: Johor Lama

Member of the Johor State Legislative Assembly for Johor Lama
- Incumbent
- Assumed office 12 March 2022
- Preceded by: Rosleli Jahari (BN–UMNO)
- Majority: 6,039 (2022)

Johor Women Youth Chief of the United Malays National Organisation
- In office 2022–2023
- National Women Youth Chief: Zahida Zarik Khan
- Preceded by: Nur Ain Abdul Rahman
- Succeeded by: Rina Farhana Abdullah

Faction represented in the Johor State Legislative Assembly
- 2022–: Barisan Nasional

Personal details
- Born: Norliza binti Noh; 14 May 1983 (age 42) Kota Tinggi, Johor, Malaysia
- Citizenship: Malaysian
- Party: United Malays National Organisation (UMNO)
- Other political affiliations: Barisan Nasional (BN)
- Occupation: Politician

Norlizah binti Noh is a Malaysian politician who has served as Member of the Johor State Legislative Assembly (MLA) for Johor Lama since March 2022. She served as Member of the Johor State Executive Council (EXCO) in the Barisan Nasional (BN) state administration under Menteri Besar Onn Hafiz Ghazi from March 2022 to February 2024. She is a member and the Kota Tinggi Division Information Chief of the United Malays National Organisation (UMNO), a component party of the BN coalition. She previously was the Johor UMNO Women Youth Chief and the Division Women Youth Chief of Kota Tinggi.

== Election results ==
Johor State Legislative Assembly
Year	Constituency		Votes	Pct	Opponent(s)	Votes	Pct	Ballots cast	Majority	Turnout
2022	N37 Johor Lama	Norlizah Noh (UMNO)	12,171	60.56%	Alias Rasman (BERSATU)	6,132	30.51%	20,098	6,039	61.54%
2022	N37 Johor Lama	Norlizah Noh (UMNO)	12,171	60.56%	Omar Mokhtar (PKR)	1,527	7.60%	20,098	6,039	61.54%
2022	N37 Johor Lama	Norlizah Noh (UMNO)	12,171	60.56%	Mohd Shukor Ahmad (PEJUANG)	268	1.33%	20,098	6,039	61.54%
