= Muszaide Makmor =

Malaysian politician

Yang Berhormat Muszaide Makmor MLA
- موسزايد ماکمور

Member of the Johor State Legislative Assembly for Sedili
- Incumbent
- Assumed office 2022
- Preceded by: Rasman Ithnain

Personal details
- Born: Muszaide bin Makmor
- Citizenship: Malaysian
- Party: UMNO
- Other party: Barisan Nasional
- Occupation: Politician

Muszaide bin Makmor is a Malaysian politician from UMNO. He has served as the Member of the Johor State Legislative Assembly for Sedili since 2022. He is also the Chief of UMNO Kota Tinggi division.

== Election results ==
Johor State Legislative Assembly
| Year | Constituency | Candidate | Votes | Pct. | Opponent(s) | Votes | Pct. | Ballots cast | Majority | Turnout |
|---|---|---|---|---|---|---|---|---|---|---|
| 2022 | N36 Sedili | Muszaide Makmor (UMNO) | 12,063 | 63.52% | Hasnol Hadi Sebalas (BERSATU) | 6,384 | 33.62% | 19,377 | 5,679 | 67.61% |
| 2022 | N36 Sedili | Muszaide Makmor (UMNO) | 12,063 | 63.52% | Mat Khairyi Samsudin (AMANAH) | 333 | 1.75% | 19,377 | 5,679 | 67.61% |
| 2022 | N36 Sedili | Muszaide Makmor (UMNO) | 12,063 | 63.52% | Tariq Ismail Mustafa (PEJUANG) | 211 | 1.11% | 19,377 | 5,679 | 67.61% |
