= Syed Hamid Albar =

Malaysian politician

Yang Berbahagia Tan Sri Dato' Seri Syed Hamid Albar PMN SPMJ SPMK SPDK DPPN DGSM DPMJ SMJ AMN
- سيد حميد البر
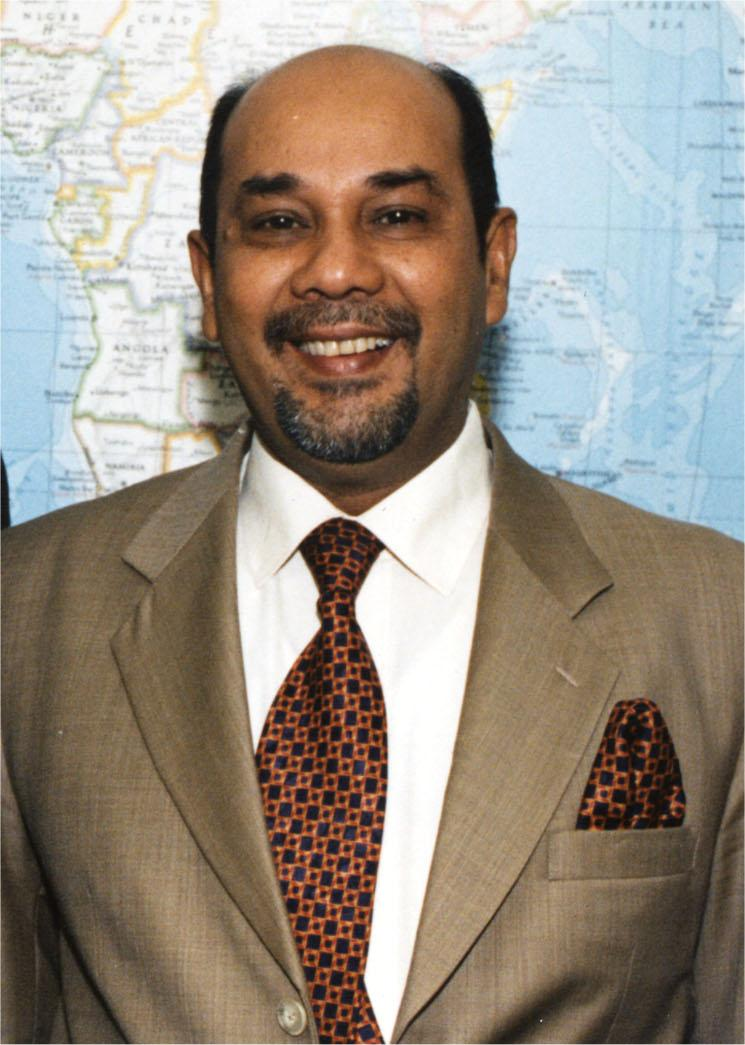

1st Chancellor of the Asia e University
- Incumbent
- Assumed office 15 October 2022
- Vice Chancellor: Nik Mustapha Raja Abdullah
- Preceded by: Position established

Ministerial roles
- 1990–1995: Minister in the Prime Minister's Department
- 1990–1995: Minister of Justice
- 1995–1999: Minister of Defence
- 1999–2008: Minister of Foreign Affairs
- 2008–2009: Minister of Home Affairs

Faction represented in Dewan Rakyat
- 1990–2013: Barisan Nasional

Personal details
- Born: Syed Hamid bin Syed Jaafar Albar; 15 January 1944 (age 82) Kampung Melayu Air Hitam, Penang, Japanese occupation of Malaya (now Malaysia)
- Party: United Malays National Organisation (UMNO) (–2018; since 2026); Malaysian United Indigenous Party (BERSATU) (2018–2022)
- Other political affiliations: Barisan Nasional (BN) (–2018; since 2026); Pakatan Harapan (PH) (2018–2020); Perikatan Nasional (PN) (2020–2022)
- Spouse: Sharifah Aziah Syed Zainal Abidin
- Relations: Syed Jaafar Albar (father)
- Children: 6
- Occupation: Politician
- Profession: Lawyer
- Website: syedhamidalbar44.blogspot.com

Syed Hamid bin Syed Jaafar Albar (Jawi: سيد حميد بن سيد جعفر البر; Arabic: سيد حامد بن سيد جعفر البار Sayyid Ḥāmid bin Sayyid Ja'far al-bār; born 15 January 1944) is a Malaysian lawyer and politician who has served as 1st Chancellor of the Asia e University (AeU) since October 2022. He served as Minister in the Prime Minister's Department, Minister of Justice, Minister of Defence, Minister of Foreign Affairs and Minister of Home Affairs in the Barisan Nasional (BN) administration under former Prime Ministers Mahathir Mohamad and Abdullah Ahmad Badawi from October 1990 to April 2009. He also served as Member of Parliament (MP) for Kota Tinggi from November 1990 to May 2013. He was a member of the Malaysian United Indigenous Party (BERSATU), a component party of the ruling Perikatan Nasional (PN) and formerly Pakatan Harapan (PH) coalitions. Prior to that, he was also a member of the United Malays National Organisation (UMNO), a component party of the ruling BN coalition. He retired from politics in February 2022 and left UMNO for BERSATU in September 2018. He had also served as the Chairman of Land Public Transport Commission (SPAD) which was already dissolved.

== Early life ==
Syed Hamid was born in Kampung Melayu Air Hitam, Penang, Malaysia, to Syed Jaafar Albar, an UMNO politician and former cabinet minister. Syed Hamid's father was of Hadhrami Arab descent, and migrated from Indonesia to Malaysia shortly before World War II.

He had his secondary education at Maxwell School before going to Methodist Boys' School (Kuala Lumpur) for his Form Six education. For his tertiary education, he read law in the Inns of Court, London and was called to the Degree of an Utter Barrister by the Honourable Society of Middle Temple in 1970. As a student in London, he set up a club for Malaysian expatriates and students.

He is married with 6 children.

== Political career ==
Syed Hamid has been active in UMNO in his student days, including while studying in the United Kingdom. After returning to Malaysia he became a magistrate, and then president of the Sessions Court, before entering the corporate world. In 1986 he won election to UMNO's Supreme Council and entered Parliament in 1990, as the member for Kota Tinggi. He was immediately appointed Minister for Justice, and in 1995 became the Defence Minister.

In 1999, he was appointed the Foreign Minister by Prime Minister Mahathir Mohamad. In March 2008, he was appointed the Home Minister. In April 2009, he was dropped from the Cabinet. The previous month he had contested, but failed to win, one of UMNO's three vice-president positions at the party's general assembly. He left Parliament in 2013, deciding not to re-contest the seat of Kota Tinggi, which he had held by large margins since 1990. On 18 February 2022, he announced his retirement from politics and devotion of time to legal practice work and non-governmental organisation (NGO) activities.

== Post-political career (2022–present) ==
=== Chancellor of the Asia e University (2022–present) ===
On 15 October 2022 during the 11th convocation ceremony of the Asia e University (AeU), Syed Hamid was appointed its 1st Chancellor. His appointment was made based on his "vast experience in administration and management he possesses" and confidence that he would "provide AeU with the direction and leadership to further enhance its academic standing". Responding to the appointment, Syed Hamid said that it was unexpected and that he was deeply moved, humbled and touched to get the "recognition". He also described it as a "great honour and privilege".

== Election results ==
Parliament of Malaysia
| Year | Constituency | Candidate | Votes | Pct | Opponent(s) | Votes | Pct | Ballot casts | Majority | Turnout |
|---|---|---|---|---|---|---|---|---|---|---|
| 1990 | P128 Kota Tinggi | Syed Hamid Albar (UMNO) | 36,504 | 78.57% | Ma'on Omar (S46) | 9,956 | 21.43% | 48,073 | 26,548 | 79.42% |
| 1995 | P139 Kota Tinggi | Syed Hamid Albar (UMNO) | 36,776 | 92.44% | Mohamed Hanipa Maidin (PAS) | 3,007 | 7.56% | 41,577 | 33,769 | 78.83% |
| 1999 | P139 Kota Tinggi | Syed Hamid Albar (UMNO) | 36,819 | 86.84% | Rosdin Taha Abd Rahman (keADILan) | 5,651 | 13.16% | 44,994 | 32,161 | 78.15% |
| 2004 | P156 Kota Tinggi | Syed Hamid Albar (UMNO) | Unopposed | | | | | | | |
| 2008 | P156 Kota Tinggi | Syed Hamid Albar (UMNO) | 22,682 | 85.91% | Onn Jaafar (PAS) | 3,721 | 14.09% | 27,109 | 18,961 | 79.29% |

== Honours ==
=== Honours of Malaysia ===
- Malaysia
  - Member of the Order of the Defender of the Realm (AMN) (1984)
  - Commander of the Order of the Defender of the Realm (PMN) – Tan Sri (2009)
- Johor
  - Companion of the Order of the Crown of Johor (SMJ) (1991)
  - Knight Commander of the Order of the Crown of Johor (DPMJ) – Dato' (1992)
  - Knight Grand Commander of the Order of the Crown of Johor (SPMJ) – Dato'
- Kedah
  - Knight Grand Commander of the Order of the Crown of Kedah (SPMK) – Dato' Seri (2008)
- Malacca
  - Grand Commander of the Exalted Order of Malacca (DGSM) – Datuk Seri (2007)
- Penang
  - Knight Commander of the Order of the Defender of State (DPPN) – Dato' Seri (2004)
- Sabah
  - Grand Commander of the Order of Kinabalu (SPDK) – Datuk Seri Panglima (1997)

=== Foreign honours ===
- Indonesia
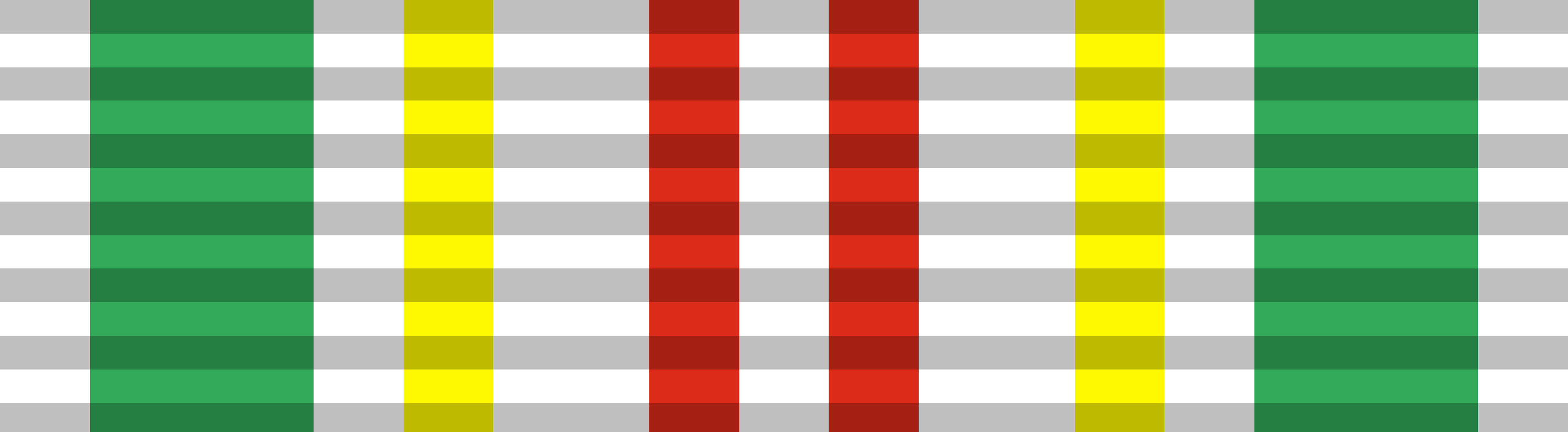
  - Star of Yudha Dharma, 1st Class (BYDU) (1996)
- Japan
  - Grand Cordon of the Order of the Rising Sun (2019)
