= Adham Baba =

Malaysian politician (born 1962)

Yang Berhormat Dato' Sri Adham Baba SSAP DMSM SIMP MLA
- أدهم بابا
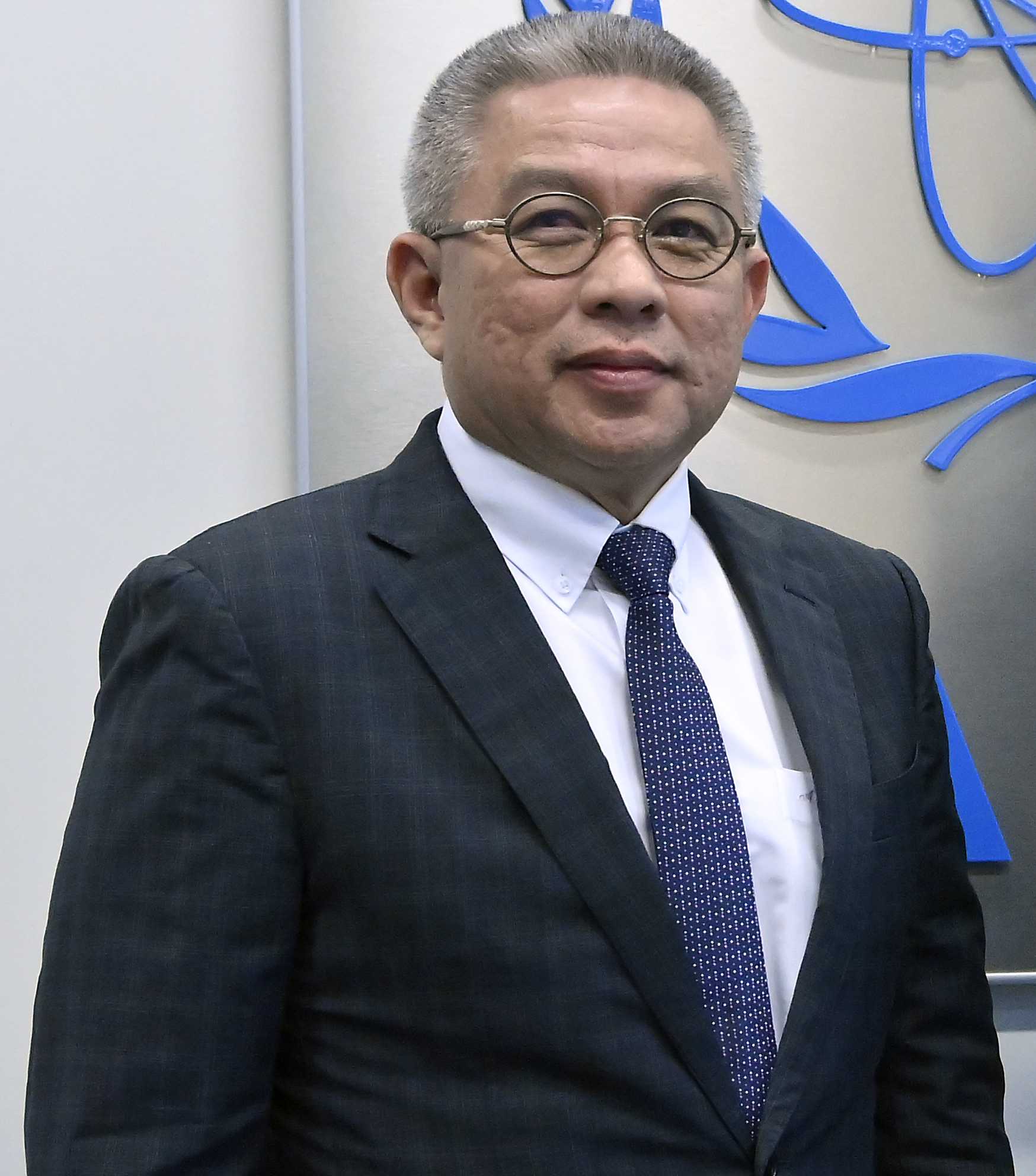
- Adham in 2022

Minister of Science, Technology and Innovation
- In office 30 August 2021 – 24 November 2022
- Monarch: Abdullah
- Prime Minister: Ismail Sabri Yaakob
- Deputy: Ahmad Amzad Hashim
- Preceded by: Khairy Jamaluddin
- Succeeded by: Chang Lih Kang (Minister of Science and Technology)
- Constituency: Tenggara

Minister of Health
- In office 10 March 2020 – 16 August 2021
- Monarch: Abdullah
- Prime Minister: Muhyiddin Yassin
- Deputy: Noor Azmi Ghazali; Aaron Ago Dagang
- Director-General: Noor Hisham Abdullah
- Preceded by: Dzulkefly Ahmad
- Succeeded by: Khairy Jamaluddin

Parliamentary Secretary, Ministry of Higher Education
- In office 27 March 2004 – 18 March 2008
- Monarchs: Sirajuddin; Mizan Zainal Abidin
- Prime Minister: Abdullah Ahmad Badawi
- Minister: Shafie Salleh (2004–2006); Mustapa Mohamed (2006–2008)
- Preceded by: Mahadzir Mohd Khir (Parliamentary Secretary in Ministry of Education)
- Succeeded by: Position abolished
- Constituency: Tenggara

Member of the Malaysian Parliament for Tenggara
- In office 9 May 2018 – 19 November 2022
- Preceded by: Halimah Mohd Sadique (BN–UMNO)
- Succeeded by: Manndzri Nasib (BN–UMNO)
- Majority: 5,933 (2018)
- In office 21 March 2004 – 8 March 2008
- Preceded by: Hishamuddin Hussein (BN–UMNO)
- Succeeded by: Halimah Mohd Sadique (BN–UMNO)
- Majority: 17,088 (2004)

Member of the Johor State Legislative Assembly for Pasir Raja
- Incumbent
- Assumed office 11 July 2026
- Preceded by: Rashidah Ismail (BN–UMNO)
- Majority: 12,446 (2026)
- In office 8 March 2008 – 9 May 2018
- Preceded by: Halimah Mohd Sadique (BN–UMNO)
- Succeeded by: Rashidah Ismail (BN–UMNO)
- Majority: 6,792 (2008); 6,666 (2013)

Faction represented in Dewan Rakyat
- 2004–2008: Barisan Nasional
- 2018–2022: Barisan Nasional

Faction represented in Johor State Legislative Assembly
- 2008–2018: Barisan Nasional
- 2026–: Barisan Nasional

Personal details
- Born: Adham bin Baba; 6 October 1962 (age 64) Batu Pahat, Johor, Federation of Malaya (now Malaysia)
- Party: United Malays National Organisation (UMNO)
- Other political affiliations: Barisan Nasional (BN)
- Spouse(s): Taibah Tabrani (died 2007) Nor Zamani Abdol Hamid (m. 2010)
- Children: 5
- Education: University of Malaya (MBBS)
- Occupation: Politician

Adham bin Baba (Jawi: أدهم بن بابا; born 6 October 1962) is a Malaysian doctor and a politician who served as Minister of Science, Technology and Innovation from 2021 to 2022. Previously, he served as Minister of Health from 2020 to 2021 and the Member of Parliament (MP) for Tenggara from 2004 to 2008 and again from 2018 to 2022, having previously been Member of the Johor State Legislative Assembly (MLA) for Parit Raja from 2008 to 2018.

Before being appointed to ministerial positions, Adham served as Parliamentary Secretary in the Ministry of Higher Education from 2004 to 2008. He is a member and the Division Chief of Tenggara of the United Malays National Organisation (UMNO), a component party of the Barisan Nasional (BN) coalition.

== Early life ==
Adham graduated with a Bachelor of Medicine and Surgery (MBBS) degree from the University of Malaya in 1987. Upon graduation, he served as a medical officer in the Ministry of Health from 1988 to 1990. In the same year, Adham began his first career as a medical doctor in the private sector in 1990 and has so to the present. He has a private clinic called Klinik Adham Sdn Bhd with 18 branches.

He also held several senior positions in government-related companies including the University of Kuala Lumpur (UniKL) Pro-Chancellor from 2013 to 2018. In addition, he had been the Chairman of UniKL Medical Services Sdn Bhd. from 2010 to 2015.

== Political career ==
He first became involved in politics in 1991 with the post of UMNO Committee Member for Senai Division. After that, he began to hold an important portfolio in the ministry. Among them, Special Education Officer in the Ministry of Youth and Sports from 2000 to 2004.

In 2004, he was elected as Member of Parliament for Tenggara. He was appointed as Parliamentary Secretary of the Ministry of Higher Education until 2008.

In 2008, he was elected as the State Assembly Member for Pasir Raja. He was the assemblyman of the constituency until 2018.

He contested for the Tenggara parliamentary seat in the 14th general election and won.

On 9 March 2020, he was appointed as the Minister of Health by Prime Minister Muhyiddin Yassin. The appointment is made as the country faces COVID-19 disease.

== Controversies and issues ==
=== Incorrect demonstration of surgical mask use ===
On 13 March 2020, Adham demonstrated the steps to how to wear a surgical mask with head ties during a televised press conference. However, he had shown an incorrect demonstration of surgical mask usage, as he had neglected to fasten the head ties of the surgical mask appropriately. He was subsequently criticized for the misleading demonstration during the televised press conference as he was the appointed Minister of Health.

=== Drinking warm water as a COVID-19 prevention ===
On 19 March 2020, Adham advised the public that drinking warm water will help prevent COVID-19 as the virus will be flushed down to the stomach and the digestive acids will kill any virus, while being on a televised interview on RTM's Bicara Naratif programme. His remarks later went viral on social media, with many netizens questioning his claim.

Dr Nur Amalina Che Bakri had criticised Adham saying that there was no scientific evidence that the stomach's acid can kill the virus. The World Health Organization (WHO) and former deputy health minister Dr. Lee Boon Chye also refuted the claim, noting that while staying hydrated by drinking water is important for overall health, it does not prevent the Coronavirus infection, whereas Boon Chye added that "warm water that's hot enough to kill the virus will kill the patient first".

Health Director-General Dr. Noor Hisham Abdullah later refuted Adham's statement, commenting that the Health Ministry's approach for patient treatment and management is always based on scientific evidence.

=== Political post on Ministry of Health Facebook page ===
On 15 April 2020, the official Facebook page of the Malaysian Ministry of Health shared a post from Facebook page "Friends of Adham Baba" which lauded the contributions of Adham in the COVID-19 pandemic, while claiming that the previous administration was being ineffective at dealing with the COVID-19 crisis.

The post was removed after garnering criticism from netizens, with many saying that the previous administration was not, by any chance involved in the handling of the pandemic in early 2020, and that the ministry should have remained neutral and apolitical.

=== "WHO conference call with 500 countries" statement ===
On 18 April 2020, Adham erroneously claimed that he participated in a World Health Organization (WHO) video-conferencing session with 'over 500 countries' during a Facebook live session with UMNO President Ahmad Zahid Hamidi. Adham had also claimed that he was confident that his accomplishments as the Health Minister was recognised globally. Netizens on Twitter took notice and mocked Dr. Adham Baba for the "500 countries" claim.

The following day, he acknowledged that he misspoke about the “500 countries” when he meant to say that the videoconference had 500 participants, from 50 countries. This was later corroborated by evidence from the official Facebook page of the Malaysian Ministry of Health (MOH) which showed on 27 March, that the WHO videoconference in question almost reached 500 participants (498 participants shown in photo evidence of the Zoom videoconference organised by the WHO), one of which was the Crisis Preparedness & Response Centre (CPRC) of the MOH.

=== Criticism by the predecessor ===
Dzulkefly Ahmad urged his successor Dr Adham Baba and the latter's two deputies to either take charge of the ministry's decision making or resign. He said many were confused by Noor Hisham's emphasis that he was just a 'messenger' and did not provide the scientific explanation behind the decision. He claimed that Malaysia had lost its political leadership. The country was running "almost automatically" since Muhyiddin's coalition overthrew the Pakatan Harapan administration in 2020. He stressed that Adham, along with his deputies Dr Noor Azmi Ghazali and Aaron Ago Dagang, must work as a team with the bureaucrats and technocrats of the Ministry of Health. "You must see, do not be afraid to be criticized. And do not just try to be praised," he said. Dr Dzulkefly said that it was the government's choice to take many of the recommendations put forward by a group of experts in an open letter addressed to Muhyiddin. The proposal includes instructing COVID-19 patients with few or no symptoms to self-quarantine at home instead of having them admitted to a hospital. "We do not actually need to use emergency regulations to 'nationalize' facilities (private hospitals) to get access to them. The Ministry of Health can load the burden on our public hospitals," he said.

=== Spanish Fly gaffe ===
On 12 July 2021 in a speech on the COVID-19 crisis at Universiti Putra Malaysia, Dr Adham Baba mentioned "Spanish fly" twice, apparently confusing the term with the Spanish Flu pandemic. In his statement, the "Spanish Fly" resulted in 1 million deaths from the years 1919 and 1916 but the COVID-19 pandemic was worse as it has resulted in 2.8 million deaths worldwide. The correct estimated deaths from the 1918 pandemic was 20 - 50 million.

Former prime minister Mahathir Mohamad said it is unusual for a trained doctor not to know the difference between the dreaded Spanish Flu and a Spanish fly.

== Personal life ==
Adham was previously married to Taibah Tabrani and has 5 children, of which, 2 are adopted. On 23 April 2007, Adham's wife was suffering from asthma and fainted at her home after suffering from a respiratory problem. She was later rushed to the hospital and later died. At the time, Adham was in Auckland, New Zealand on official duty, but cut his trip short and rushed back home upon hearing the sorrowful news.

== Election results ==
Johor State Legislative Assembly
Year	Constituency	Candidate	Votes	Pct	Opponent(s)	Votes	Pct	Ballots cast	Majority	Turnout
2008	N35 Pasir Raja	Adham Baba (UMNO)	9,701	76.93%	Menhad Awab (PAS)	2,909	23.07%	12,819	6,792	79.23%
2013	N35 Pasir Raja	Adham Baba (UMNO)	12,920	67.38%	Mohd Nazari Mokhtar (PAS)	6,254	32.68%	19,539	6,666	87.50%
2026	N35 Pasir Raja	Adham Baba (UMNO)	15,931	74.90%	Mohd Fakhruddin Moslim (PKR)	3,485	16.39%	21,537	12,446	72.23%
2026	N35 Pasir Raja	Adham Baba (UMNO)	15,931	74.90%	Yuhanita Yunan (PAS)	1,853	8.71%	21,537	12,446	72.23%

Parliament of Malaysia
Year	Constituency	Candidate	Votes	Pct	Opponent(s)	Votes	Pct	Ballots cast	Majority	Turnout
2004	P155 Tenggara	Adham Baba (UMNO)	19,706	88.27%	Salleh Farmin (PAS)	2,618	11.73%	23,056	17,088	77.32%
2018	P155 Tenggara	Adham Baba (UMNO)	20,142	54.39%	Norjepri Mohamed Jelani (BERSATU)	14,209	38.37%	37,818	5,933	84.51%
2018	P155 Tenggara	Adham Baba (UMNO)	20,142	54.39%	Yuhanita Yunan (PAS)	2,683	7.24%	37,818	5,933	84.51%

== Honours ==
- Malacca
  - Companion Class I of the Order of Malacca (DMSM) – Datuk (2003)
- Pahang
  - Grand Knight of the Order of Sultan Ahmad Shah of Pahang (SSAP) – Dato' Sri (2016)
  - Grand Knight of the Order of the Crown of Pahang (SIMP) – Dato', later Dato' Indera (2013)
