= Pasir Raja (state constituency) =

Political subdivision in Malaysia

Pasir Raja (N35)
Johor constituency

State constituency
- Legislature: Johor State Legislative Assembly
MLA
Adham Baba
BN
- Constituency created: 2003
- First contested: 2004
- Last contested: 2026

Demographics
- Population (2020): 40,041
- Electors (2026): 29,828
- Area (km²): 350

Pasir Raja is a state constituency in Johor, Malaysia, that is represented in the Johor State Legislative Assembly.

The state constituency was first contested in 2004 and is mandated to return a single Assemblyman to the Johor State Legislative Assembly under the first-past-the-post voting system.

== Demographics ==
As of 2020, Pasir Raja has a population of 40,041 people.

Ethnic breakdown of Pasir Raja's electorate as of 2022
1. Malay (69.3%)
2. Chinese (18.3%)
3. Indian (8.30%)
4. Other ethnicities (4.00%)

== History ==
=== Polling districts ===
According to the gazette issued on 2 July 2026, the Pasir Raja constituency has a total of 13 polling districts.

State constituency	Polling districts	Code	Location
Pasir Raja (N35)	FELDA Sungai Sayong	155/35/01	SK LKTP Sungai Sayong
Pasir Raja (N35)	FELDA Bukit Besar	155/35/02	SK LKTP Bukit Besar
Pasir Raja (N35)	FELDA Pasir Raja	155/35/03	SK LKTP Pasir Raja
Pasir Raja (N35)	FELDA Bukit Ramun	155/35/04	SK LKTP Bukit Ramun
Pasir Raja (N35)	Sungai Telor	155/35/05	Balai Raya Kg. Baru Sg. Telor; Dewan Terbuka Kg. Baru Sg. Telor
Pasir Raja (N35)	Sungai Johor	155/35/06	SK Sungai Telor
Pasir Raja (N35)	Sungai Kemang Selatan	155/35/07	SK Bandar
Pasir Raja (N35)	Jalan Besar	155/35/08	SK Bandar
Pasir Raja (N35)	Jalan Johor	155/35/09	SMK Laksamana
Pasir Raja (N35)	Kota Tinggi Selatan	155/35/10	SJK (T) Jalan Tajul
Pasir Raja (N35)	Ladang R.E.M.	155/35/11	SJK (T) Ladang Rem
Pasir Raja (N35)	Jalan Kota Tinggi	155/35/12	SA Taman Seri Saujana 1; SK Seri Saujana
Pasir Raja (N35)	Kampung Baru Sungai Redan	155/35/13	Balai Aktiviti Komuniti Kg. Baru Sg. Redan

=== Representation history ===
Members of the Legislative Assembly for Pasir Raja
Assembly	No	Years	Member	Party
Constituency created from Panti and Bukit Permai
11th	N35	2004–2008	Halimah Mohamed Sadique	BN (UMNO)
12th	N35	2008–2013	Adham Baba	BN (UMNO)
13th	N35	2013–2018	Adham Baba	BN (UMNO)
14th	N35	2018–2022	Rashidah Ismail	BN (UMNO)
15th	N35	2022–2026	Rashidah Ismail	BN (UMNO)
16th	N35	2026–present	Adham Baba	BN (UMNO)

== Election results ==
Johor state election, 2026
Party	Candidate	Votes	%	∆%
BN	Adham Baba	15,931	74.90	▲16.69
PH	Mohd Fakhruddin Moslim	3,485	16.39	▲16.39
PN	Yuhanita Yunan	1,853	8.71	▼19.17
Total valid votes		21,269	100.00	
Total rejected ballots		251		
Unreturned ballots		17		
Turnout		21,537	72.23	▲13.42
Registered electors		29,818		
Majority		12,446	58.52	▲28.19
BN hold		Swing		?

Johor state election, 2022
Party	Candidate	Votes	%	∆%
BN	Rashidah Ismail	9,381	58.21	▲6.62
PN	Intan Jawahir	4,493	27.88	▲27.88
PKR	Mohd Fakhruddin Moslim	1,976	12.26	▼27.50
PEJUANG	Mohd Yusri Yusof	265	1.64	▲1.64
Total valid votes		16,115	100.00	
Total rejected ballots		289		
Unreturned ballots		88		
Turnout		16,492	58.81	
Registered electors		28,045		
Majority		4,888	30.33	
BN hold		Swing		

Johor state election, 2018
Party	Candidate	Votes	%	∆%
BN	Rashidah Ismail	8,055	51.59	▼15.79
PKR	Abrary Ramly	6,208	39.76	▲39.76
PAS	Bahrin Alias	1,351	8.65	▼23.97
Total valid votes		15,614	97.51	
Total rejected ballots		398	2.49	
Unreturned ballots		0	0.00	
Turnout		16,012	84.28	
Registered electors		18,998		
Majority		1,847		
BN hold		Swing		
Source(s) "RESULTS OF CONTESTED ELECTION AND STATEMENTS OF THE POLL AFTER THE OFFICIAL ADDITION OF VOTES".

Johor state election, 2013
Party	Candidate	Votes	%	∆%
BN	Adham Baba	12,920	67.38	▼9.55
PAS	Mohd Nazari Mokhtar	6,254	32.62	▲9.55
Total valid votes		19,174	100.00	
Total rejected ballots		329		
Unreturned ballots		36		
Turnout		19,539	87.48	▲8.25
Registered electors		22,336		
Majority		6,666	34.77	▼19.10
BN hold		Swing		
{{{1}}}

Johor state election, 2008
Party	Candidate	Votes	%	∆%
BN	Adham Baba	9,701	76.93	▼10.93
PAS	Menhad Awab	2,909	23.07	▲10.93
Total valid votes		12,610	100.00	
Total rejected ballots		1,118		
Unreturned ballots		413		
Turnout		14,141	79.23	▲3.60
Registered electors		17,849		
Majority		6,792	53.86	▼21.86
BN hold		Swing		
{{{1}}}

Johor state election, 2004
Party	Candidate	Votes	%	∆%
BN	Halimah Mohamed Sadique	10,402	87.86	▲11.10
PAS	Sanip Ithnin	1,437	12.14	▼11.10
Total valid votes		11,839	100.00	
Total rejected ballots		301		
Unreturned ballots		63		
Turnout		12,203	75.63	▲1.50
Registered electors		16,136		
Majority		8,965	75.72	▲22.20
This was a new constituency created.
