= Sedili (state constituency) =

Political subdivision in Malaysia

Sedili (N36)
Johor constituency

State constituency
- Legislature: Johor State Legislative Assembly
MLA
Muszaide Makmor
BN
- Constituency created: 1984
- First contested: 1986
- Last contested: 2026

Demographics
- Population (2020): 27,508
- Electors (2026): 29,090
- Area (km²): 1,115

Sedili is a state constituency in Johor, Malaysia, that is represented in the Johor State Legislative Assembly.

The state constituency was first contested in 1986 and is mandated to return a single Assemblyman to the Johor State Legislative Assembly under the first-past-the-post voting system.

== Demographics ==
As of 2020, Sedili has a population of 27,508 people.

Ethnic breakdown of Sedili's electorate as of 2026
1. Malay (96.5%)
2. Chinese (1.40%)
3. Other ethnicities (1.40%)
4. Indian (0.60%)

== History ==
=== Polling districts ===
According to the gazette issued on 2 July 2026, the Sedili constituency has a total of 14 polling districts.

State constituency	Polling districts	Code	Location
Sedili（N36）	Sungai Ara	156/36/01	SK FELCRA Sungai Ara
Sedili（N36）	Tunjuk Laut	156/36/02	SK Tunjuk Laut
Sedili（N36）	Tenggaroh Selatan	156/36/03	SK LKTP Tenggaroh Selatan
Sedili（N36）	Sedili Pantai	156/36/04	SK Seri Setia Jaya
Sedili（N36）	Sedili Besar	156/36/05	SK Sedili Besar
Sedili（N36）	Sedili Tengah	156/36/06	SK Gemut
Sedili（N36）	Sedili Darat	156/36/07	Dewan Seberguna Kg. Gemut
Sedili（N36）	Mawai	156/36/08	SK Mawai
Sedili（N36）	Aping Barat	156/36/09	SK Seri Aman
Sedili（N36）	Aping Timor	156/36/10	SK Bukit Mahkota
Sedili（N36）	Sedili Kechil	156/36/11	SK Sedili Kechil
Sedili（N36）	Bukit Easter	156/36/12	SMK Bandar Easter
Sedili（N36）	Wah Hah I	156/36/13	SK Bandar Easter
Sedili（N36）	Wah Hah II	156/36/14	SK (FELDA) Bukit Waha

=== Representation history ===
Members of the Legislative Assembly for Sedili
Assembly	No	Years	Member	Party
Constituency created from Kota Tinggi, Johor Lama and Tiram
7th	N27	1986-1990	Tosrin Jarvanthi	BN (UMNO)
8th	N27	1990-1995	Mohamadon Abu Bakar	BN (UMNO)
9th	N29	1995-1999	Mohamadon Abu Bakar	BN (UMNO)
10th	N29	1999-2004	Asiah Md Ariff	BN (UMNO)
11th	N36	2004-2008	Abdul Rashid Abd. Mokhti	BN (UMNO)
12th	N36	2008-2013	Rasman Ithnain	BN (UMNO)
13th	N36	2013-2018	Rasman Ithnain	BN (UMNO)
14th	N36	2018	Rasman Ithnain	BN (UMNO)
14th	N36	2018-2020	Rasman Ithnain	PH (BERSATU)
14th	N36	2020-2022	Rasman Ithnain	PN (BERSATU)
15th	N36	2022–2026	Muszaide Makmor	BN (UMNO)
16th	N36	2026-present	Muszaide Makmor	BN (UMNO)

== Election results ==
Johor state election, 2026
Party	Candidate	Votes	%	∆%
BN	Muszaide Makmor	16,279	85.18	▲21.66
PN	Rasman Ithnain	2,298	11.68	▼21.94
PH	Amirul Husni Onn	593	3.14	▲1.39
Total valid votes		22,060	100.00	
Total rejected ballots		265		
Unreturned ballots		19		
Turnout		22,344	76.81	▲9.20
Registered electors		29,090		
Majority		16,213	73.50	▲43.59
BN hold		Swing		

Johor state election, 2022
Party	Candidate	Votes	%	∆%
BN	Muszaide Makmor	12,063	63.52	▼12.46
PN	Hasnol Hadi Sebalas	6,384	33.62	▲33.62
PH	Mat Khairi Samsudin	333	1.75	▼22.27
PEJUANG	Tariq Ismail Mustafa	211	1.11	▲1.11
Total valid votes		18,991	98.01	
Total rejected ballots		309		
Unreturned ballots		77		
Turnout		19,377	67.61	▼17.04
Registered electors		28,659		
Majority		5,679	29.90	▼22.06
BN hold		Swing		
Source(s) "Keputusan #PRNJOHORBERNAMA #PRNJOHOR". prn.bernama.com. Archived from the original on 2022-05-17."Dashboard SPR".

Johor state election, 2018
Party	Candidate	Votes	%	∆%
BN	Rasman Ithnain	13,407	75.98	▼15.80
PKR	Abdul Razak Abdul Esa	4,239	24.02	▲15.81
Total valid votes		17,646	97.16	
Total rejected ballots		335	1.84	
Unreturned ballots		181	1.00	
Turnout		18,162	84.65	▼4.92
Registered electors		21,456		
Majority		9,168	51.96	▼31.62
BN hold		Swing		
Source(s) "RESULTS OF CONTESTED ELECTION AND STATEMENTS OF THE POLL AFTER THE OFFICIAL ADDITION OF VOTES STATE CONSTITUENCIES FOR THE STATE OF JOHORE".

Johor state election, 2013
Party	Candidate	Votes	%	∆%
BN	Rasman Ithnain	19,907	91.79	▲0.03
PKR	Abdul Kadir Sainudin	1,780	8.21	▲8.21
Total valid votes		21,687	97.96	
Total rejected ballots		402	1.82	
Unreturned ballots		50	0.23	
Turnout		22,139	89.60	▲8.28
Registered electors		24,716		
Majority		18,127	83.58	▲0.06
BN hold		Swing		
Source(s) "KEPUTUSAN PILIHAN RAYA UMUM DEWAN UNDANGAN NEGERI".

Johor state election, 2008
Party	Candidate	Votes	%	∆%
BN	Rasman Ithnain	14,017	91.76	▼2.86
PAS	Monaim Hassan	1,259	8.24	▲2.86
Total valid votes		15,276	97.89	
Total rejected ballots		330	2.84	
Unreturned ballots		0	0.00	
Turnout		15,606	81.32	▲4.62
Registered electors		19,190		
Majority		12,758	83.52	▼5.72
BN hold		Swing		
Source(s) "KEPUTUSAN PILIHAN RAYA UMUM DEWAN UNDANGAN NEGERI PERAK BAGI TAHUN 2008".

Johor state election, 2004
Party	Candidate	Votes	%	∆%
BN	Abdul Rashid Abdul Mokhti	12,876	94.62	▲10.53
PAS	Musa Wagiman	732	5.38	▼10.53
Total valid votes		13,608	98.17	
Total rejected ballots		228	1.64	
Unreturned ballots		25	0.18	
Turnout		13,861	76.70	▼0.60
Registered electors		18,070		
Majority		12,144	89.24	▲21.06
BN hold		Swing		
Source(s) "KEPUTUSAN PILIHAN RAYA UMUM DEWAN UNDANGAN NEGERI PERAK BAGI TAHUN 2004".

Johor state election, 1999
Party	Candidate	Votes	%	∆%
BN	Asiah Md Ariff	17,481	84.09	▼6.29
PAS	Abdullah Shahadan	3,307	15.91	▲15.91
Total valid votes		20,788	96.39	
Total rejected ballots		761	3.53	
Unreturned ballots		18	0.08	
Turnout		21,567	77.30	▼0.59
Registered electors		27,902		
Majority		14,174	68.18	▼12.58
BN hold		Swing		
Source(s) "KEPUTUSAN PILIHAN RAYA UMUM DEWAN UNDANGAN NEGERI PERAK BAGI TAHUN 1999".

Johor state election, 1995
Party	Candidate	Votes	%	∆%
BN	Mohamadon Abu Bakar	17,539	90.38	▲20.06
S46	Shari Abdul Samat	1,866	9.62	▼20.06
Total valid votes		19,405	95.86	
Total rejected ballots		803	3.97	
Unreturned ballots		36	0.18	
Turnout		20,244	77.89	▲1.50
Registered electors		25,991		
Majority		15,673	80.76	▲40.12
BN hold		Swing		
Source(s) "KEPUTUSAN PILIHAN RAYA UMUM DEWAN UNDANGAN NEGERI PERAK BAGI TAHUN 1995".

Johor state election, 1990
Party	Candidate	Votes	%	∆%
BN	Mohamadon Abu Bakar	14,228	70.32	▼10.53
S46	Syed Abu Bakar Hood	6,004	29.68	▲29.68
Total valid votes		20,232	94.94	
Total rejected ballots		1,078	5.06	
Unreturned ballots		0	0.00	
Turnout		21,310	76.39	▲4.59
Registered electors		27,895		
Majority		8,224	40.64	▼21.06
BN hold		Swing		
Source(s) "KEPUTUSAN PILIHAN RAYA UMUM DEWAN UNDANGAN NEGERI PERAK BAGI TAHUN 1990".

Johor state election, 1986
Party	Candidate	Votes	%
BN	Mohamadon Abu Bakar	12,894	80.85
SDP	Mohamad Yusof Hamdan	3,054	19.15
Total valid votes		15,948	94.16
Total rejected ballots		989	5.84
Unreturned ballots		0	0.00
Turnout		16,937	71.80
Registered electors		23,589	
Majority		9,840	61.70
This was a new constituency created.
Source(s) "KEPUTUSAN PILIHAN RAYA UMUM DEWAN UNDANGAN NEGERI PERAK BAGI TAHUN 1986".
