= Sekijang =

Federal constituency in Johor, Malaysia

Sekijang (P141)
Johor constituency

Federal constituency
- Legislature: Dewan Rakyat
- MP: Zaliha Mustafa; PH
- Constituency created: 2003
- First contested: 2004
- Last contested: 2022

Demographics
- Population (2020): 79,347
- Electors (2026): 65,823
- Area (km²): 550
- Pop. density (per km²): 144.3

Sekijang is a federal constituency in Segamat District, Johor, Malaysia, that has been represented in the Dewan Rakyat since 2004.

The federal constituency was created in the 2003 redistribution and is mandated to return a single member to the Dewan Rakyat under the first past the post voting system.

== Demographics ==
Ethnic breakdown of Sekijang's electorate as of 2022
1. Malay (59.0%)
2. Chinese (36.7%)
3. Indian (4.00%)
4. Other ethnicities (0.30%)

As of 2020, Sekijang has a population of 79,347 people.

Age breakdown of Sekijang's electorate as of 2022
1. 18-20 5.97 (5.60%)
2. 21-29 21.03 (19.7%)
3. 30-39 23.2 (21.8%)
4. 40-49 17.68 (16.6%)
5. 50-59 15.97 (15.0%)
6. 60-69 12.57 (11.8%)
7. 70-79 7.01 (6.58%)
8. 80-89 2.63 (2.47%)
9. above 90 0.55 (0.52%)
Gender breakdown of Sekijang's electorate as of 2022
1. Male (50.3%)
2. Female (49.7%)

== History ==
=== Polling districts ===
According to the gazette issued on 2 July 2026, the Sekijang constituency has a total of 26 polling districts.

State constituency	Polling districts	Code	Location
Pemanis（N03）	Pemanis 1	141/03/01	SK LKTP Pemanis 1
Pemanis（N03）	Pemanis 2	141/03/02	SK (FELDA) Pemanis 2
Pemanis（N03）	Bumbun	141/03/03	SA Mukim Jabi Kampung Bumbun
Pemanis（N03）	Sulir	141/03/04	SK Dato Seri Maharaja Lela
Pemanis（N03）	Pekan Jabi	141/03/05	SJK (C) Jabi
Pemanis（N03）	Tahang Rimau	141/03/06	SK Datuk Wan Idris
Pemanis（N03）	Jalan Buloh Kasap	141/03/07	SMJK Seg Hwa
Pemanis（N03）	Kampong Mengkudu	141/03/08	Balai Raya dan Tabika KEMAS Jalan Pemuda
Pemanis（N03）	Kampong Tengah	141/03/09	SJK (C) Kampung Tengah
Pemanis（N03）	FELDA Medoi	141/03/10	SK LKTP Medoi
Pemanis（N03）	Kampong Jawa	141/03/11	SK Kampong Jawa; SA Kampong Jawa
Pemanis（N03）	Gubah	141/03/12	SK Kampong Tengah
Pemanis（N03）	Kampong Abdullah Selatan	141/03/13	SK Canossian Convent
Kemelah（N04）	Segamat Baru	141/04/01	SK Segamat Baru; SK Bandar Putra; SJK (T) Bandar Segamat
Kemelah（N04）	Ladang Segamat	141/04/02	SJK (T) Ladang Segamat
Kemelah（N04）	FELDA Kemelah	141/04/03	SK (FELDA) Kemelah
Kemelah（N04）	Redong	141/04/04	SK (FELDA) Redong
Kemelah（N04）	Sekijang	141/04/05	Balai Raya FELCRA Berhad
Kemelah（N04）	Chuan Moh San	141/04/06	SJK (C) Tua Ooh
Kemelah（N04）	Kampong Melayu Raya	141/04/07	SK Melayu Raya
Kemelah（N04）	Bukit Siput	141/04/08	SK Kampung Paya Besar
Kemelah（N04）	Pekan Bukit Siput Utara	141/04/09	SJK (C) Bukit Siput
Kemelah（N04）	Paya Pulai	141/04/10	SA Taman Pelangi
Kemelah（N04）	Pogoh	141/04/11	SK Pagoh
Kemelah（N04）	Pekan Bukit Siput Selatan	141/04/12	SRA Bersepadu Segamat; SA Bukit Siput
Kemelah（N04）	Bandar Putra Segamat	141/04/13	SMK Bandar Putra

=== Representation history ===
Members of Parliament for Sekijang
Parliament	No	Years	Member	Party	Vote Share
Constituency created from Segamat and Labis
11th	P141	2004–2008	Baharum Mohamed (بحرهاروم محمد)	BN (UMNO)	19,628; 80.40%
12th	P141	2008–2013	Baharum Mohamed (بحرهاروم محمد)	BN (UMNO)	17,979; 68.91%
13th	P141	2013–2018	Anuar Abdul Manap (أنور عبدالمناف)	BN (UMNO)	19,934; 54.08%
14th	P141	2018–2022	Natrah Ismail (نترح اسماعيل)	PH (PKR)	19,559; 51.69%
15th	P141	2022–present	Zaliha Mustafa (زاليحة مصطفى)	PH (PKR)	18,941; 39.27%

=== State constituency ===
Parliamentary constituency	State constituency						
Parliamentary constituency	1954–59*	1959–1974	1974–1986	1986–1995	1995–2004	2004–2018	2018–present
Sekijang						Kemelah	
Sekijang						Pemanis	

=== Historical boundaries ===
State Constituency	Area	
State Constituency	2003	2018
Kemelah	Bandar IOI Segamat; Bandar Putra Segamat; Bukit Siput; FELDA Kemelah; Segamat Baru	Bandar IOI Segamat; Bukit Siput; FELCRA Sekijang; FELDA Kemelah; Segamat Baru
Pemanis	FELCRA Sekijang; FELDA Medoi; FELDA Pemanis; Kampung Tengah; Pekan Jabi	FELDA Medoi; FELDA Pemanis; Kampung Jawa; Kampung Tengah; Pekan Jabi

=== Current state assembly members ===
No.	State Constituency	Member	Coalition (Party)
N03	Pemanis	Anuar Abdul Manap	BN (UMNO)
N04	Kemelah	Raven Kumar Krishnasamy	BN (MIC)

=== Local governments & postcodes ===
No.	State Constituency	Local Government	Postcode
N03	Pemanis	Segamat Municipal Council	85000 Segamat; 85300 Labis; 85400 Chaah
N04	Kemelah	Segamat Municipal Council; Labis District Council (FELDA Redong area)	85000 Segamat; 85300 Labis; 85400 Chaah

== Election results ==
Malaysian general election, 2022: Sekijang
Party	Candidate	Votes	%	∆%
PH	Zaliha Mustafa	18,941	39.27	▲39.27
BN	Md Salleheen Mohamad	17,207	35.67	▼12.64
PN	Uzzair Ismail	11,612	24.07	▲24.07
Heritage	Mohd Zohar Ahmad	339	0.70	▲0.70
PEJUANG	Mohd Saiful Faizul Abd Halim	138	0.29	▲0.29
Total valid votes		48,237	100.00	
Total rejected ballots		475		
Unreturned ballots		142		
Turnout		45,854	75.39	▼9.58
Registered electors		63,981		
Majority		1,734	3.60	▲0.22
PH hold		Swing		
Source(s) https://lom.agc.gov.my/ilims/upload/portal/akta/outputp/1753254/PUB%20617%20PARLIMEN%20JOHOR.pdf

Malaysian general election, 2018: Sekijang
Party	Candidate	Votes	%	∆%
PKR	Natrah Ismail	19,559	51.69	▲5.77
BN	Ayub Rahmat	18,278	48.31	▼5.77
Total valid votes		37,837	100.00	
Total rejected ballots		558		
Unreturned ballots		132		
Turnout		38,527	84.97	▼2.15
Registered electors		45,596		
Majority		1,281	3.38	▼4.78
PKR gain from BN		Swing		?
Source(s) "His Majesty's Government Gazette - Notice of Contested Election, Parliament for the State of Johore [P.U. (B) 244/2018]" (PDF). Attorney General's Chambers of Malaysia. 3 May 2018. Archived from the original (PDF) on 2019-12-29. "Federal Government Gazette - Results of Contested Election and Statements of the Poll after the Official Addition of Votes, Parliamentary Constituencies for the State of Johore [P.U. (B) 318/2018]" (PDF). Attorney General's Chambers of Malaysia. 28 May 2018.

Malaysian general election, 2013: Sekijang
Party	Candidate	Votes	%	∆%
BN	Anuar Abdul Manap	19,934	54.08	▼14.83
PKR	Julailey Jemadi	16,927	45.92	▲14.83
Total valid votes		36,861	100.00	
Total rejected ballots		587		
Unreturned ballots		71		
Turnout		37,519	87.12	▲11.09
Registered electors		43,066		
Majority		3,007	8.16	▼29.66
BN hold		Swing		
Source(s) "Federal Government Gazette - Notice of Contested Election, Parliament for the State of Johore [P.U. (B) 181/2013]" (PDF). Attorney General's Chambers of Malaysia. 26 April 2013. "Federal Government Gazette - Results of Contested Election and Statements of the Poll after the Official Addition of Votes, Parliamentary Constituencies for the State of Johore [P.U. (B) 222/2013]" (PDF). Attorney General's Chambers of Malaysia. 22 May 2013.

Malaysian general election, 2008: Sekijang
Party	Candidate	Votes	%	∆%
BN	Baharum Mohamed	17,979	68.91	▼11.49
PKR	Zulkaply Salleh	8,112	31.09	▲11.49
Total valid votes		26,091	100.00	
Total rejected ballots		622		
Unreturned ballots		3		
Turnout		26,716	76.03	▲3.36
Registered electors		35,138		
Majority		9,867	37.82	▼22.98
BN hold		Swing		

Malaysian general election, 2004: Sekijang
Party	Candidate	Votes	%
BN	Baharum Mohamed	19,628	80.40
PKR	Zulkaply Salleh	4,786	19.60
Total valid votes		24,414	100.00
Total rejected ballots		0	
Unreturned ballots		0	
Turnout		24,414	72.67
Registered electors		33,594	
Majority		14,842	60.80
This was a new constituency created.
