= Pontian (federal constituency) =

Federal constituency in Johor, Malaysia

Pontian (P164)
Johor constituency

Federal constituency
- Legislature: Dewan Rakyat
- MP: Ahmad Maslan; BN
- Constituency created: 1974
- First contested: 1974
- Last contested: 2022

Demographics
- Population (2020): 81,778
- Electors (2026): 76,449
- Area (km²): 444
- Pop. density (per km²): 184.2

Pontian is a federal constituency in Pontian District, Johor, Malaysia, that has been represented in the Dewan Rakyat since 1974.

The federal constituency was created in the 1974 redistribution and is mandated to return a single member to the Dewan Rakyat under the first past the post voting system.

== Demographics ==
Ethnic breakdown of Pontian's electorate as of 2022
1. Malay (70.7%)
2. Chinese (28.1%)
3. Indian (1.00%)
4. Other ethnicities (0.20%)

As of 2020, Pontian has a population of 81,778 people.

Age breakdown of Pontian's electorate as of 2022
1. 18-20 (5.65%)
2. 21-29 (20.2%)
3. 30-39 (22.1%)
4. 40-49 (16.5%)
5. 50-59 (14.8%)
6. 60-69 (11.2%)
7. 70-79 (6.52%)
8. 80-89 (2.49%)
9. above 90 (0.57%)
Gender breakdown of Pontian's electorate as of 2022
1. Male (49.7%)
2. Female (50.3%)

== History ==
=== Polling districts ===
According to the gazette issued on 2 July 2026, the Pontian constituency has a total of 36 polling districts.

State constituency	Polling districts	Code	Location
Benut (N53)	Lubok Sipat	164/53/01	SK Seri Bahagia
Benut (N53)	Permatang Sepam	164/53/02	SK Seri Jaya
Benut (N53)	Parit Betak	164/53/03	SMK Parit Betak
Benut (N53)	Permatang Duku	164/53/04	SK Seri Setia
Benut (N53)	Parit Mansor	164/53/05	SK Parit Markom
Benut (N53)	Parit Ismail	164/53/06	SK Seri Kembar
Benut (N53)	Sri Jawa	164/53/07	SK Seri Al Ulum
Benut (N53)	Parit Satu	164/53/08	SK Seri Anom
Benut (N53)	Sanglang	164/53/09	SK Sanglang
Benut (N53)	Simpang Jawa	164/53/10	SJK (C) Lok Yu 1
Benut (N53)	Benut	164/53/11	SMK Sri Tanjung
Benut (N53)	Bandar Benut Utara	164/53/12	SMK Benut
Benut (N53)	Bandar Benut Selatan	164/53/13	SA Bandar Benut
Benut (N53)	Parit Abdul Rahman	164/53/14	SMA (Arab) Bugisiah
Benut (N53)	Tampok	164/53/15	SK Seri Sinaran
Pulai Sebatang (N54)	Kampong Parit Kahar	164/54/01	SK Seri Sekawan Desa
Pulai Sebatang (N54)	Parit Keroma	164/54/02	SJK (C) Lee Ming
Pulai Sebatang (N54)	Ayer Baloi	164/54/03	SK Ayer Baloi
Pulai Sebatang (N54)	Bandar Ayer Baloi Selatan	164/54/04	SMK Ayer Baloi
Pulai Sebatang (N54)	Bandar Ayer Baloi Utara	164/54/05	SJK (C) Chi Chih
Pulai Sebatang (N54)	Parit Panjang	164/54/06	SK Jaya Mulia
Pulai Sebatang (N54)	Kampong Parit Haji Karim	164/54/07	SK Seri Pulai
Pulai Sebatang (N54)	Parit Sikom	164/54/08	SJK (C) Nan Mah
Pulai Sebatang (N54)	Kampong Jawa	164/54/09	SK Kampong Jawa
Pulai Sebatang (N54)	Pulai Sebatang	164/54/10	SK Pulai Sebatang
Pulai Sebatang (N54)	Api-Api	164/54/11	SK Api-Api
Pulai Sebatang (N54)	Sungai Trus	164/54/12	SK Kayu Ara Pasong
Pulai Sebatang (N54)	Pontian Besar Kiri	164/54/13	SMK Kayu Ara Pasong
Pulai Sebatang (N54)	Jalan Alsagoff	164/54/14	SJK (C) Tah Tong; SMK Sri Perhentian; SK Bandar Pontian; SK Tengku Mahmood Iskandar (1)
Pulai Sebatang (N54)	Pantai Bandar Pontian	164/54/15	SK Tengku Mahmood Iskansar (1)
Pulai Sebatang (N54)	Pegawai	164/54/16	SK Bandar Pontian
Pulai Sebatang (N54)	Jalan Taib	164/54/17	SJK (C) Pei Chun (1); SJK (C) Pei Chun (2)
Pulai Sebatang (N54)	Bakek	164/54/18	SK Tengku Mahmood Iskandar (2)
Pulai Sebatang (N54)	Parit Semerah	164/54/19	SA Parit Semerah
Pulai Sebatang (N54)	Parit Mesjid	164/54/20	SA Bandar Pontian
Pulai Sebatang (N54)	Parit Mesjid Darat	164/54/21	SMK Dato' Ali Haji Ahmad

=== Representation history ===
Members of Parliament for Pontian
Parliament	No	Years	Member	Party	Vote Share
Constituency created from Pontian Selantan and Pontian Utara
4th	P112	1974–1977	Ali Ahmad (علي احمد)	BN (UMNO)	Uncontested
4th	P112	1978	Ikhwan Nasir (إخوان ناصر)	BN (UMNO)	21,811; 81.15%
5th	P112	1978–1982	Ikhwan Nasir (إخوان ناصر)	BN (UMNO)	28,867; 89.90%
6th	P112	1982–1986	Mokhtaram Rabidin (مختارعام ربيدين)	BN (UMNO)	Uncontested
7th	P132	1986–1990	Law Lai Heng (吴来兴)	BN (MCA)	20,772; 55.76%
8th	P132	1990–1995	Ong Ka Ting (黄家定)	BN (MCA)	24,362; 61.93%
9th	P144	1995–1999	Ong Ka Ting (黄家定)	BN (MCA)	37,230; 88.00%
10th	P144	1999–2004	Ong Ka Ting (黄家定)	BN (MCA)	38,169; 82.21%
11th	P164	2004–2008	Hasni Mohammad (حسني محمد)	BN (UMNO)	26,667; 82.88%
12th	P164	2008–2013	Ahmad Maslan (أحمد مصلان)	BN (UMNO)	23,121; 72.71%
13th	P164	2013–2018	Ahmad Maslan (أحمد مصلان)	BN (UMNO)	27,804; 66.39%
14th	P164	2018–2022	Ahmad Maslan (أحمد مصلان)	BN (UMNO)	21,132; 46.21%
15th	P164	2022–present	Ahmad Maslan (أحمد مصلان)	BN (UMNO)	23,201; 40.81%

=== State constituency ===
Parliamentary constituency	State constituency						
Parliamentary constituency	1954–59*	1959–1974	1974–1986	1986–1995	1995–2004	2004–2018	2018–present
Pontian			Benut			Benut	
Pontian			Kukup				
Pontian				Pulai Sebatang			

=== Historical boundaries ===
State Constituency	Area				
State Constituency	1974	1984	1994	2003	2018
Benut	Ayer Baloi; Benut; Parit Haji Omar Lapis; Sanglang; Sungai Manggis			Benut; Parit Bujang; Parit Hassan; Sanglang; Tampok	
Kukup	Pontian Besar; Pontian Kechil; Rembah; Serkat; Tanjung Piai	Pekan Nanas; Pengkalan Raja; Rembah; Serkat; Tanjung Piai			
Pulai Sebatang		Kampung Parit Baru; Kayu Ara Pasong; Pontian Besar; Pontian Kechil; Sungai Manggis		Ayer Baloi; Kayu Ara Pasong; Parit Bugis; Pontian Besar; Pontan Kechil	Ayer Baloi; Kayu Ara Pasong; Parit Mesjid; Pontian Besar; Pontan Kechil

=== Current state assembly members ===
No.	State Constituency	Member	Coalition (Party)
N53	Benut	Mohd Sumali Reduan	BN (UMNO)
N54	Pulai Sebatang	Hasrunizah Hassan	BN (UMNO)

=== Local governments & postcodes ===
No.	State Constituency	Local Government	Postcode
N53	Benut	Pontian Municipal Council	82100 Ayer Baloi; 82200 Benut; 83100 Tampok
N54	Pulai Sebatang	Pontian Municipal Council	82100 Ayer Baloi; 82200 Benut; 83100 Tampok

== Election results ==
Malaysian general election, 2022
Party	Candidate	Votes	%	∆%
BN	Ahmad Maslan	23,201	40.81	▼5.40
PN	Isa Ab Hamid	17,448	30.68	▲30.68
PH	Syazwan Zdainal Abdin	15,901	27.97	▲27.97
PEJUANG	Jamaluddin Mohamad	306	0.54	▲0.54
Total valid votes		56,851	100.00	
Total rejected ballots		620		
Unreturned ballots		410		
Turnout		57,881	75.59	▼8.42
Registered electors		75,212		
Majority		5,758	10.13	▲8.31
BN hold		Swing		
Source(s) https://lom.agc.gov.my/ilims/upload/portal/akta/outputp/1753254/PUB%20617%20PARLIMEN%20JOHOR.pdf

Malaysian general election, 2018
Party	Candidate	Votes	%	∆%
BN	Ahmad Maslan	21,132	46.21	▼20.18
PKR	Karmaine Sardini	20,299	44.39	▲10.78
PAS	Baharom Mohamad	4,295	9.40	▲9.40
Total valid votes		45,726	100.00	
Total rejected ballots		738		
Unreturned ballots		219		
Turnout		46,683	84.01	▼2.29
Registered electors		55,570		
Majority		833	1.82	▼30.96
BN hold		Swing		
Source(s) "His Majesty's Government Gazette - Notice of Contested Election, Parliament for the State of Johore [P.U. (B) 244/2018]" (PDF). Attorney General's Chambers of Malaysia. 3 May 2018. Archived from the original (PDF) on 29 December 2019. "Federal Government Gazette - Results of Contested Election and Statements of the Poll after the Official Addition of Votes, Parliamentary Constituencies for the State of Johore [P.U. (B) 318/2018]" (PDF). Attorney General's Chambers of Malaysia. 28 May 2018.

Malaysian general election, 2013
Party	Candidate	Votes	%	∆%
BN	Ahmad Maslan	27,804	66.39	▼6.32
PKR	Haniff @ Ghazali Hosman	14,077	33.61	▲6.32
Total valid votes		41,881	100.00	
Total rejected ballots		871		
Unreturned ballots		79		
Turnout		42,831	86.30	▲10.52
Registered electors		49,633		
Majority		13,727	32.78	▼12.64
BN hold		Swing		
Source(s) "Federal Government Gazette - Notice of Contested Election, Parliament for the State of Johore [P.U. (B) 181/2013]" (PDF). Attorney General's Chambers of Malaysia. 26 April 2013. "Federal Government Gazette - Results of Contested Election and Statements of the Poll after the Official Addition of Votes, Parliamentary Constituencies for the State of Johore [P.U. (B) 222/2013]" (PDF). Attorney General's Chambers of Malaysia. 22 May 2013.

Malaysian general election, 2008
Party	Candidate	Votes	%	∆%
BN	Ahmad Maslan	23,121	72.71	▼10.17
PKR	Mohd Annuar Mohd Salleh	8,677	27.29	▲10.17
Total valid votes		31,798	100.00	
Total rejected ballots		1,008		
Unreturned ballots		0		
Turnout		32,806	75.83	▲0.43
Registered electors		43,264		
Majority		14,444	45.42	▼20.34
BN hold		Swing		

Malaysian general election, 2004
Party	Candidate	Votes	%	∆%
BN	Hasni Mohammad	26,667	82.88	▲0.67
PKR	Hassan Abdul Karim	5,509	17.12	▼0.67
Total valid votes		32,176	100.00	
Total rejected ballots		1,167		
Unreturned ballots		117		
Turnout		33,460	75.40	▲0.97
Registered electors		44,376		
Majority		21,158	65.76	▲1.34
BN hold		Swing		

Malaysian general election, 1999
Party	Candidate	Votes	%	∆%
BN	Ong Ka Ting	38,169	82.21	▼5.79
PKR	Diong Chi Tzuoh	8,259	17.79	▲17.79
Total valid votes		46,428	100.00	
Total rejected ballots		1,572		
Unreturned ballots		55		
Turnout		48,055	74.43	▲0.36
Registered electors		64,564		
Majority		29,910	64.42	▼11.58
BN hold		Swing		

Malaysian general election, 1995
Party	Candidate	Votes	%	∆%
BN	Ong Ka Ting	37,230	88.00	▲26.07
S46	Saleh @ Daud Hassan	5,079	12.00	▲12.00
Total valid votes		42,309	100.00	
Total rejected ballots		2,265		
Unreturned ballots		198		
Turnout		44,772	74.07	▼0.99
Registered electors		60,445		
Majority		32,151	76.00	▲52.14
BN hold		Swing		

Malaysian general election, 1990
Party	Candidate	Votes	%	∆%
BN	Ong Ka Ting	24,362	61.93	▲6.17
DAP	Gan Peck Cheng	14,978	38.07	▲9.11
Total valid votes		39,340	100.00	
Total rejected ballots		2,297		
Unreturned ballots		0		
Turnout		41,637	75.06	▲0.38
Registered electors		55,472		
Majority		9,384	23.86	▼2.94
BN hold		Swing		

Malaysian general election, 1986
Party	Candidate	Votes	%	∆%
BN	Law Lai Heng @ Go Lai Heng	20,772	55.76	▲55.76
DAP	Chong Kee Kiam	10,787	28.96	▲28.96
Independent	Abd Nasir Shain	5,098	13.69	▲13.69
PAS	Mohd Jufri Tahir	443	1.19	▲1.19
SDP	Chuah Ah Hock	150	0.40	▲0.40
Total valid votes		37,250	100.00	
Total rejected ballots		1,738		
Unreturned ballots		0		
Turnout		38,988	74.68	
Registered electors		52,207		
Majority		9,985	26.80	
BN hold		Swing		

Malaysian general election, 1982
Party	Candidate	Votes	%	∆%
On the nomination day, Mokhtaram Rabidin won uncontested.
BN	Mokhtaram Rabidin			
Total valid votes			100.00	
Total rejected ballots				
Unreturned ballots				
Turnout				
Registered electors		49,909		
Majority				
BN hold		Swing		

Malaysian general election, 1978
Party	Candidate	Votes	%	∆%
BN	Ikhwan Nasir	28,867	89.80	▲8.65
PAS	Hussein Besar	3,279	10.20	▲10.20
Total valid votes		32,146	100.00	
Total rejected ballots		863		
Unreturned ballots		0		
Turnout		33,009	79.32	
Registered electors		41,615		
Majority		25,588	79.60	▲9.73
BN hold		Swing		

Malaysian general by-election, 28 January 1978 Upon the death of incumbent, Ali Ahmad
Party	Candidate	Votes	%	∆%
BN	Ikhwan Nasir	21,811	81.15	▲81.15
Parti Rakyat Malaysia	Osman Sapian	3,032	11.28	▲11.28
Independent	Yeow Lin Thiam	2,036	7.57	▲7.57
Total valid votes		26,879	100.00	
Total rejected ballots		1,413		
Unreturned ballots				
Turnout		28,292		
Registered electors				
Majority		18,779	69.87	
BN hold		Swing		

Malaysian general election, 1974
Party	Candidate	Votes	%	∆%
On the nomination day, Ali Ahmad won uncontested.
BN	Ali Ahmad			
Total valid votes			100.00	
Total rejected ballots				
Unreturned ballots				
Turnout				
Registered electors		33,156		
Majority				
This was a new constituency created.
