= Ahmad Maslan =

Malaysian politician

Yang Berhormat Datuk Seri Dr. Ahmad Maslan SMW DMSM PSI II MP
- أحمد مصلان
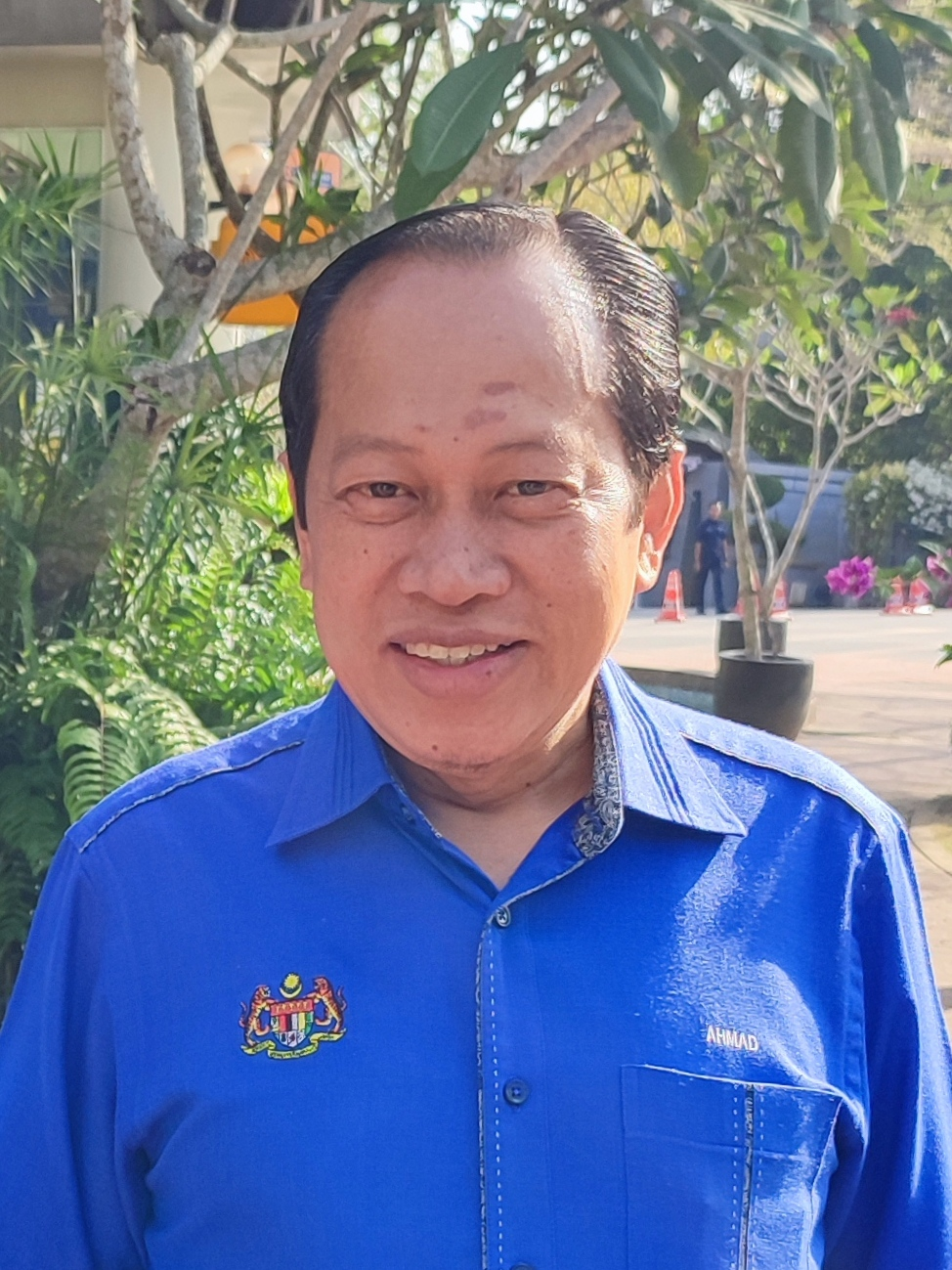
- Ahmad in 2024

Deputy Minister of Works
- Incumbent
- Assumed office 12 December 2023
- Monarchs: Abdullah (2023–2024); Ibrahim Iskandar (since 2024)
- Prime Minister: Anwar Ibrahim
- Minister: Alexander Nanta Linggi
- Preceded by: Abdul Rahman Mohamad
- Constituency: Pontian

Deputy Minister of Finance I
- In office 10 December 2022 – 12 December 2023 Serving with Steven Sim Chee Keong (Deputy Minister of Finance II)
- Monarch: Abdullah
- Prime Minister: Anwar Ibrahim
- Minister: Anwar Ibrahim
- Preceded by: Mohd Shahar Abdullah
- Succeeded by: Lim Hui Ying (Deputy Minister of Finance)
- Constituency: Pontian

Deputy Minister of International Trade and Industry
- In office 29 July 2015 – 9 May 2018 Serving with Lee Chee Leong (2015–2016) & Chua Tee Yong (2016–2018)
- Monarchs: Abdul Halim (2015–2016); Muhammad V (2016–2018)
- Prime Minister: Najib Razak
- Minister: Mustapa Mohamed; Ong Ka Chuan
- Preceded by: Hamim Samuri
- Succeeded by: Ong Kian Ming
- Constituency: Pontian

Deputy Minister of Finance
- In office 16 May 2013 – 29 July 2015 Serving with Chua Tee Yong
- Monarch: Abdul Halim
- Prime Minister: Najib Razak
- Minister: Najib Razak (Minister of Finance); Ahmad Husni Hanadzlah (Minister of Finance II)
- Preceded by: Awang Adek Hussin; Donald Lim Siang Chai
- Succeeded by: Johari Abdul Ghani
- Constituency: Pontian

Deputy Minister in the Prime Minister's Department
- In office 10 April 2009 – 15 May 2013
- Monarchs: Mizan Zainal Abidin; Abdul Halim
- Prime Minister: Najib Razak
- Minister: Nor Mohamed Yakcop
- Preceded by: Mohd Johari Baharum
- Succeeded by: Waytha Moorthy Ponnusamy
- Constituency: Pontian

Secretary-General of the United Malays National Organisation
- In office 12 March 2020 – 22 March 2023
- President: Ahmad Zahid Hamidi
- Preceded by: Annuar Musa
- Succeeded by: Asyraf Wajdi Dusuki

Secretary-General of the Barisan Nasional
- In office 5 January 2021 – 8 June 2021
- Chairman: Ahmad Zahid Hamidi
- Preceded by: Annuar Musa
- Succeeded by: Zambry Abdul Kadir

State Deputy Chairman of the United Malays National Organisation of Johor
- Incumbent
- Assumed office 22 March 2023
- President: Ahmad Zahid Hamidi
- State Chairman: Mohamed Khaled Nordin (March–December 2023); Onn Hafiz Ghazi (since December 2023)
- Preceded by: Nur Jazlan Mohamed

Division Chief of the United Malays National Organisation of Pontian
- Incumbent
- Assumed office 18 March 2023
- President: Ahmad Zahid Hamidi
- Deputy: Mohd Sumali Reduan
- Preceded by: Hasni Mohammad

Division Deputy Chief of the United Malays National Organisation of Pontian
- In office 2008 – 18 March 2023
- President: Abdullah Ahmad Badawi (2008–2009); Najib Razak (2009–2018); Ahmad Zahid Hamidi (2018–2023)
- Division Chief: Hasni Mohammad
- Succeeded by: Mohd Sumali Reduan

Member of the Malaysian Parliament for Pontian
- Incumbent
- Assumed office 8 March 2008
- Preceded by: Hasni Mohammad (BN–UMNO)
- Majority: 14,444 (2008); 13,727 (2013); 833 (2018); 5,758 (2022)

Faction represented in Dewan Rakyat
- 2008–: Barisan Nasional

Personal details
- Born: Ahmad bin Maslan; 30 April 1966 (age 60) Benut, Johor, Malaysia
- Citizenship: Malaysian
- Party: United Malays National Organisation (UMNO)
- Other political affiliations: Barisan Nasional (BN)
- Spouse: Noraini Sulaiman
- Children: 3
- Education: Victoria University of Wellington (BA); Universiti Kebangsaan Malaysia (MBA); Universiti Utara Malaysia (PhD)
- Occupation: Politician
- Website: http://www.ahmadmaslan.my/

Ahmad bin Maslan (Jawi: أحمد بن مصلان; born 30 April 1966) is a Malaysian politician who has served as the Deputy Minister of Works under Minister Alexander Nanta Linggi since December 2023 and previously served as the Deputy Minister of Finance I from December 2022 to December 2023 in the Unity Government administration under Prime Minister Anwar Ibrahim. He has served as the Member of Parliament (MP) for Pontian since March 2008. He also had served as the Deputy Minister of International Trade and Industry, Deputy Minister of Finance and Deputy Minister in the Prime Minister's Department in the Barisan Nasional (BN) administration under former Prime Minister Najib Razak and former Ministers Nor Mohamed Yakcop, Najib Razak, Ahmad Husni Hanadzlah, Mustapa Mohamed and Ong Ka Chuan from April 2009 to the collapse of the BN administration in May 2018. He is a member of the United Malays National Organisation (UMNO), a component party of the BN coalition. He has also served as State Deputy Chairman of UMNO of Johor and Division Chief of UMNO of Pontian since March 2023. He also served as the Secretary-General of UMNO from March 2020 to March 2023 and also of BN from January 2021 to June 2021 as well as Division Deputy Chief of UMNO of Pontian from 2008 to his promotion to the division chief in March 2023.

== Early life and education ==
Ahmad Maslan was born on 30 April 1966 at Kampung Parit Yusuf, Lubok Sipat, Benut, Pontian, Johor to rubber tapping parents. He graduated the Bachelor of Economics and Political Science from the Victoria University of Wellington and received Master of Business Administration from the Universiti Kebangsaan Malaysia.

== Political career ==
Ahmad bin Maslan has been the information chief of United Malays National Organisation (UMNO), an appointed party position, from 2009 until 29 January 2016 when he was appointed as the party's new Information Technology (IT) bureau chief.

He was first elected as MP in the 2008 general election for the federal seat of Pontian, previously held by Hasni Mohammad of UMNO. In April 2009 he was appointed as a Deputy Minister in the Prime Minister's Department. After successfully defended his seat in 2013 general election, he was appointed as the Deputy Finance Minister. On 3 April 2017, he was appointed as Deputy Minister of International Trade and Industry (MITI). He was reelected in 2018 general election, unfortunately Barisan Nasional became the opposition coalition due to failing to gain a simple majority in the Dewan Rakyat. He was not appointed to any positions in Muhyiddin's and Ismail Sabri's cabinets.

=== Deputy Minister of Works (since 2023) ===
In a cabinet reshuffle on 12 December 2023, Ahmad was retained as a deputy minister but was moved from the Ministry of Finance to the Ministry of Works. Ahmad announced that the toll fares of the expressways would be waived in view of the Christmas on 23 and 26 December 2023.

== Personal life ==
Ahmad Maslan is married to Noraini Sulaiman. The couple has four children.

== Election results ==
Parliament of Malaysia
Year	Constituency	Candidate	Votes	Pct	Opponent(s)	Votes	Pct	Ballots cast	Majority	Turnout
2008	P164 Pontian	Ahmad Maslan (UMNO)	23,121	70.48%	Mohd Annuar Mohd Salleh (PKR)	8,677	26.45%	32,806	14,444	75.83%
2013	P164 Pontian	Ahmad Maslan (UMNO)	27,804	64.92%	Haniff @ Ghazali Hosman (PKR)	14,077	32.87%	42,831	13,727	86.30%
2018	P164 Pontian	Ahmad Maslan (UMNO)	21,132	46.21%	Karmaine Sardini (BERSATU)	20,299	44.39%	46,683	833	84.00%
2018	P164 Pontian	Ahmad Maslan (UMNO)	21,132	46.21%	Baharom Mohamad (PAS)	4,295	9.40%	46,683	833	84.00%
2022	P164 Pontian	Ahmad Maslan (UMNO)	23,201	40.81%	Isa Ab Hamid (BERSATU)	17,448	30.68%	57,881	5,758	75.59%
2022	P164 Pontian	Ahmad Maslan (UMNO)	23,201	40.81%	Syazwan Zdainal Abdin (DAP)	15,901	27.97%	57,881	5,758	75.59%
2022	P164 Pontian	Ahmad Maslan (UMNO)	23,201	40.81%	Jamaluddin Mohamad (PEJUANG)	306	0.54%	57,881	5,758	75.59%

== Honours ==
=== Honours of Malaysia ===
- Malaysia
  - Recipient of the 17th Yang di-Pertuan Agong Installation Medal (2024)
- Federal Territory (Malaysia)
  - Grand Commander of the Order of the Territorial Crown (SMW) – Datuk Seri (2018)
- Johor
  - Second Class of the Sultan Ibrahim of Johor Medal (PSI II) (2026)
- Malacca
  - Companion Class I of the Order of Malacca (DMSM) – Datuk (2009)

== See also ==
- Pontian (federal constituency)
