= Ismail Mohamed (Malaysian politician) =

Malaysian politician

Ismail Mohamed PSI
- إسماعيل بن محمد

Johor State Executive Councillor (Agriculture and Agro-Based Industry : 14 May 2013–12 March 2017) (Agriculture, Agro-Based Industry, Entrepreneurships and Co-operatives Development : 12 March 2017–12 May 2018)
- In office 14 May 2013 – 12 May 2018
- Monarch: Ibrahim Ismail
- Menteri Besar: Mohamed Khaled Nordin
- Preceded by: Aziz Kaprawi
- Succeeded by: Sahruddin Jamal (Agriculture and Agro-Based Industry); Sheikh Umar Bagharib Ali (Entrepreneurships and Co-operatives Development)
- Constituency: Bukit Serampang

Member of the Johor State Legislative Assembly for Bukit Serampang
- In office 5 May 2013 – 9 May 2018
- Preceded by: Tahir Mohd. Taat (UMNO–BN)
- Succeeded by: Sahruddin Jamal (BERSATU–PH)
- Majority: 7,845 (2013)

Personal details
- Born: Johor, Malaysia
- Citizenship: Malaysian
- Party: United Malays National Organisation (UMNO)
- Other political affiliations: Barisan Nasional (BN)
- Occupation: Politician

Ismail bin Mohamed is a Malaysian politician. He was the Member of Johor State Legislative Assembly for Bukit Serampang and Johor State Executive Councillor.

== Election results ==
Parliament of Malaysia
Year	Constituency	Candidate	Votes	Pct	Opponent(s)	Votes	Pct	Ballots cast	Majority	Turnout
2018	P143 Pagoh	Ismail Mohamed (UMNO)	16,631	38.97%	Muhyiddin Yassin (BERSATU)	23,558	55.21%	43,365	6,927	84.77%
2018	P143 Pagoh	Ismail Mohamed (UMNO)	16,631	38.97%	Ahmad Nawfal Mahfodz (PAS)	2,483	5.82%	43,365	6,927	84.77%

Johor State Legislative Assembly
Year	Constituency	Candidate	Votes	Pct	Opponent(s)	Votes	Pct	Ballots cast	Majority	Turnout
2013	N07 Bukit Serampang	Ismail Mohamed (UMNO)	12,977	71.66%	Saadon Abdullah (PKR)	5,132	28.34%	18,491	7,845	86.50%
2022	N07 Bukit Kepong	Ismail Mohamed (UMNO)	9,163	41.08%	Sahruddin Jamal (BERSATU)	9,873	43.86%	22,303	710	59.48%
2022	N07 Bukit Kepong	Ismail Mohamed (UMNO)	9,163	41.08%	Afiqah Zulkifli (MUDA)	3,076	13.79%	22,303	710	59.48%
2022	N07 Bukit Kepong	Ismail Mohamed (UMNO)	9,163	41.08%	Md. Taib Md. Suhut (PEJUANG)	191	0.86%	22,303	710	59.48%

== Honours ==
- Johor
  - Second Class of the Sultan Ibrahim of Johor Medal (PSI II) (2015)
