= Chong Fat Full =

Malaysian politician and dentist (born 1960)

- 张发虎

Member of the Johor State Executive Council (Unity, Trade & Consumer Affairs)
- In office 6 March 2020 – 15 March 2022
- Monarch: Ibrahim Iskandar
- Menteri Besar: Hasni Mohammad
- Preceded by: Ramakrishnan Suppiah (Unity, Domestic Trade & Consumer Affairs); Jimmy Puah Wee Tse (International Trade)
- Succeeded by: Ling Tian Soon (Unity); Lee Ting Han (Trade & Consumer Affairs)
- Constituency: Pemanis

2nd Associate Chief of the Malaysian United Indigenous Party
- In office 3 August 2022 – 14 February 2026
- President: Muhyiddin Yassin
- Preceded by: Edmund Santhara Kumar Ramanaidu
- Succeeded by: TBA

Member of the Johor State Legislative Assembly for Pemanis
- In office 9 May 2018 – 12 March 2022
- Preceded by: Lau Chin Hoon (BN–GERAKAN)
- Succeeded by: Anuar Abdul Manap (BN–UMNO)
- Majority: 363 (2018)

Faction represented in Johor State Legislative Assembly
- 2018–2020: Pakatan Harapan
- 2020: Independent
- 2020–2022: Perikatan Nasional

Personal details
- Born: Chong Fat Full; 21 July 1960 (age 65) Johor, Federation of Malaya (now Malaysia)
- Citizenship: Malaysian
- Party: People's Justice Party (PKR) (–2020); Malaysian United Indigenous Party (BERSATU) (2020–2026); Independent (since 2026)
- Other political affiliations: Pakatan Harapan (PH) (–2020); Perikatan Nasional (PN) (2020-2026)
- Occupation: Politician
- Profession: Dentist

Chong Fat Full (simplified Chinese: 张发虎; traditional Chinese: 張發虎; Jyutping: Zoeng1 Faat3 Fu2; Pe̍h-ōe-jī: Tiuⁿ Hoat-hó͘; born 21 July 1960) is a Malaysian politician and dentist who served as Member of the Johor State Executive Council (EXCO) in the Barisan Nasional (BN) state administration under Menteri Besar Hasni Mohammad from March 2020 to March 2022, Member of Johor State Legislative Assembly (MLA) for Pemanis from May 2018 to March 2022 and the 2nd Associate Chief of BERSATU from August 2022 to his resignation from the party in February 2026. He is an independent. He was an associate member of the Malaysian United Indigenous Party (BERSATU), a component party of the Perikatan Nasional (PN) coalition and a member of the People's Justice Party (PKR), a component party of the Pakatan Harapan (PH) coalition. He was an independent who was aligned with the ruling BN coalition before joining BERSATU and after leaving PKR. He was also the sole Johor EXCO Member of the Chinese ethnicity from March 2020 to March 2022. He played a central role in the fall of the Johor state government led by the democratically elected PH during the political crisis in February 2020 by leaving PH and supporting BN and PN to form a new state government.

== Election results ==
Johor State Legislative Assembly
Year	Constituency	Candidate	Votes	Pct	Opponent(s)	Votes	Pct	Ballots cast	Majority	Turnout
2018	N03 Pemanis	Chong Fat Full (PKR)	8,304	45.14%	Koo Shiaw Lee (Gerakan)	7,941	43.17%	18,843	363	84.40%
2018	N03 Pemanis	Chong Fat Full (PKR)	8,304	45.14%	Normala Sudirman (PAS)	2,151	11.69%	18,843	363	84.40%
2022	N10 Tangkak	Chong Fat Full (BERSATU)	3,092	15.58%	Ee Chin Li (DAP)	8,105	40.85%	19,840	372	55.81%
2022	N10 Tangkak	Chong Fat Full (BERSATU)	3,092	15.58%	Ong Chee Siang (MCA)	7,733	38.98%	19,840	372	55.81%
2022	N10 Tangkak	Chong Fat Full (BERSATU)	3,092	15.58%	Muhammad Ariel Zabridin (PEJUANG)	789	3.98%	19,840	372	55.81%
2022	N10 Tangkak	Chong Fat Full (BERSATU)	3,092	15.58%	Zainal Bahrom A. Kadir (IND)	121	0.61%	19,840	372	55.81%
