= Anuar Abdul Manap =

Malaysian politician

Yang Berhormat Tuan Anuar Abd Manap JSM MLA
- أنوار عبدالمناڤ

Member of the Johor State Legislative Assembly for Pemanis
- Incumbent
- Assumed office 12 March 2022
- Preceded by: Chong Fat Full (PN–BERSATU)
- Majority: 4,187 (2022); 8,380 (2026)

Member of the Malaysian Parliament for Sekijang
- In office 5 May 2013 – 9 May 2018
- Preceded by: Baharum Mohamed (BN–UMNO)
- Succeeded by: Natrah Ismail (PH–PKR)
- Majority: 3,007 (2013)

Personal details
- Born: Anuar bin Abd Manap; 30 December 1976 (age 49) Kg Layang-Layang, Kluang, Johor
- Citizenship: Malaysia
- Party: United Malay National Organisation (UMNO)
- Other political affiliations: Barisan Nasional (BN)
- Spouse: Zaleha Yahya
- Children: 4
- Occupation: Politician

Anuar bin Abd Manap is a Malaysian politician who has served as the Member of the Johor State Legislative Assembly (MLA) for Pemanis March 2022. He was the Member of Parliament (MP) for Sekijang from 2013 to 2018. He is a member and the Deputy Division Chief of Sekijang of the United Malays National Organisation (UMNO) in Malaysia's Barisan Nasional (BN) coalition.

== Early days ==
He was born in Kampung Layang-layang, Kluang, Johor on 30 December 1976. His family later moved to Felda Pemanis, Segamat, Johor and he was raised there.

== Education ==
Anuar started studying at Felda Pemanis LKTP Primary School in 1982. He then went to secondary school at Sekolah Menengah Arab Khairiah Gubah Segamat in 1988. In 1991, he continued to study form 4 at Sekolah Menengah Buloh Kasap Segamat.

In 1993, he entered the Sal Group Of Colleague for a Diploma in Information Technology course and subsequently to Charles Sturt University Australia in 1995 for Bachelor of Information Technology.

== Politics ==
In the 2013 general election (GE13), he defeated People's Justice Party (PKR) candidate Julailey Jemadi with a majority of 3,007 votes to win the Sekijang parliamentary seat.

In the 2018 general election (GE14), he was chosen by UMNO as BN candidate to contest the Johor State Legislative Assembly seat of Kemelah which he had lost.

In the 2022 Johor state election, he won the Pemanis seat with a majority of 4,187.

== Private life ==
He is married to Zaleha bt Yahya and Siti Nurasmah bt Osman, and raised 4 children.

== Election results ==
Parliament of Malaysia
Year	Constituency	Candidate	Votes	Pct	Opponent(s)	Votes	Pct	Ballots cast	Majority	Turnout
2013	P141 Sekijang	Anuar Abdul Manap (UMNO)	19,934	54.08%	Julailey Jemadi (PKR)	16,927	45.92%	37,519	3,007	87.12%

Johor State Legislative Assembly
Year	Constituency	Candidate	Votes	Pct	Opponent(s)	Votes	Pct	Ballots cast	Majority	Turnout
2018	N04 Kemelah	Anuar Abdul Manap (UMNO)	8,481	42.83%	Sulaiman Mohd Nor (AMANAH)	10,836	55.04%	19,687	2,355	84.60%
2022	N03 Pemanis	Anuar Abdul Manap (UMNO)	8,678	53.43%	Yoong Thau (PKR)	4,491	27.65%	16,241	4,187	54.28%
2022	N03 Pemanis	Anuar Abdul Manap (UMNO)	8,678	53.43%	Uzzair Ismail (BERSATU)	3,825	23.55%	16,241	4,187	54.28%
2022	N03 Pemanis	Anuar Abdul Manap (UMNO)	8,678	53.43%	Azita Amrin (PEJUANG)	247	1.52%	16,241	4,187	54.28%
2026	N03 Pemanis	Anuar Abdul Manap (UMNO)	14,506	68.12%	Jalex Lee En Xiang (PKR)	6,126	28.77%	21,295	8,380	70.96%
2026	N03 Pemanis	Anuar Abdul Manap (UMNO)	14,506	68.12%	Arvientharan Anandan (MIPP)	663	3.11%	21,295	8,380	70.96%

== Honours ==
- Malaysia
  - Companion of the Order of Loyalty to the Crown of Malaysia (JSM) (2024)
