= Natrah Ismail =

Malaysian politician (1950–2023)

- نطره إسماعيل

Member of the Malaysian Parliament for Sekijang
- In office 9 May 2018 – 19 November 2022
- Preceded by: Anuar Abdul Manap (BN–UMNO)
- Succeeded by: Zaliha Mustafa (PH–PKR)
- Majority: 1,281 (2018)

Faction represented in Dewan Rakyat
- 2018–2022: Pakatan Harapan

Personal details
- Born: Natrah binti Ismail; 14 September 1950 Kampung Lubok Batu, Segamat District, Johor, Federation of Malaya
- Died: 2 November 2023 (aged 73) Segamat District, Johor, Malaysia
- Citizenship: Malaysian
- Party: People's Justice Party (PKR)
- Other party: Pakatan Harapan (PH)

Natrah binti Ismail (14 September 1950 – 2 November 2023) was a Malaysian politician who served as the Member of Parliament (MP) for Sekijang from May 2018 to November 2022. She was a member of the People's Justice Party (PKR), a component party of the Pakatan Harapan (PH) coalition.

== Political career ==
Natrah made her electoral debut in the Johor State Legislative Assembly elections in 2013 in a losing effort to UMNO’s Ayub Rahmat by 2,260 votes in the Kemelah constituency.

Five years later in 2018, she won a rematch against Ayub, this time defeating him by 1,281 votes to win the Sekijang parliamentary seat.

Natrah was one of the first-time MPs elected as the Pakatan Harapan coalition swept into power, ending the 61 years rule of the BN federal government.

In 2021, Natrah claimed she had been approached to defect and give her support as a federal lawmaker to the Perikatan Nasional government led by the then-Prime Minister Muhyiddin Yassin. She was later reported to have rejected the offer. However, in the 2022 general election, she was not fielded as a PKR candidate due to her ailing heath, with Dr Zaliha Mustafa succeeding her as the Sekijang MP.

== Death ==
Natrah Ismail died from cancer on 2 November 2023, at the age of 73.

== Election results ==
Johor State Legislative Assembly
Year	Constituency	Candidate	Votes	Pct	Opponent(s)	Votes	Pct	Ballots cast	Majority	Turnout
2013	N04 Kemelah	Natrah Ismail (PKR)	7,657	43.57%	Ayub Rahmat (UMNO)	9,917	56.43%	17,803	2,260	87.06%

Parliament of Malaysia
Year	Constituency	Candidate	Votes	Pct	Opponent(s)	Votes	Pct	Ballots cast	Majority	Turnout
2018	P141 Sekijang	Natrah Ismail (PKR)	19,559	51.69%	Ayub Rahmat (UMNO)	18,278	48.31%	38,527	1,281	84.97%
