= Lee Ting Han =

Malaysian politician and lawyer

Yang Berhormat Tuan Lee Ting Han MLA

Member of the Johor State Executive Council
- Incumbent
- Assumed office 13 February 2024
- Monarch: Ibrahim Iskandar
- Menteri Besar: Onn Hafiz Ghazi
- Portfolio: Investment, Trade, Consumer Affairs & Human Resources
- Preceded by: Himself (Investment, Trade & Consumer Affairs); Mohd Hairi Mad Shah (Human Resources)
- Constituency: Paloh
- In office 26 March 2022 – 13 February 2024
- Monarch: Ibrahim Iskandar
- Menteri Besar: Onn Hafiz Ghazi
- Portfolio: Investment, Trade & Consumer Affairs
- Preceded by: Mohammad Izhar Ahmad (Investment); Chong Fat Full (Trade and Consumer Affairs)
- Succeeded by: Himself
- Constituency: Paloh

Member of the Johor State Legislative Assembly for Paloh
- Incumbent
- Assumed office 12 March 2022
- Preceded by: Sheikh Umar Bagharib Ali (PH–DAP)
- Majority: 3,176 (2022)

Faction represented in Johor State Legislative Assembly
- 2022–: Barisan Nasional

Personal details
- Born: 1990 (age 35–36) Chamek, Kluang, Johor, Malaysia
- Citizenship: Malaysian
- Party: Malaysian Chinese Association (MCA)
- Other political affiliations: Barisan Nasional (BN)
- Education: University of Malaya (LLB); University of Cambridge (LLM)
- Occupation: Politician
- Profession: Lawyer

Lee Ting Han (Chinese: 李廷汉; born c. 1990) is a Malaysian politician and lawyer. He has served as Member of the Johor State Executive Council (EXCO) in the Barisan Nasional (BN) state administration under Menteri Besar Onn Hafiz Ghazi, and has been Member of the Johor State Legislative Assembly (MLA) for Paloh since March 2022. He is a member of the Malaysian Chinese Association (MCA), a component party of the BN coalition.

Lee studied at the SMK Permas Jaya, Johor Bahru (SMKPJ) from 2003 to 2009 before continuing his studies at the University of Malaya, where he graduated with a Bachelor of Laws (First Class Honours) and received the Puan Sri Haseenah Gold Medal (best student of the Bachelor of Laws programme). He then continued his postgraduate study at University of Cambridge. Before departing for the United Kingdom, Lee briefly worked at the Prime Minister's Department.

He was admitted as an advocate and solicitor of the High Court of Malaya in 2015 and has worked as a lawyer at several law firms in Kuala Lumpur. He also served as a Special Functions Officer to Wee Ka Siong, the Minister of Transport of Malaysia from March 2020 to November 2022. Lee has co-authored Media Law in Malaysia (Sweet & Maxwell) and MP Jain: Administrative Law of Malaysia (LexisNexis), and served as an editor for the Atkin’s Court Forms chapter on Judicial Review.

Lee contested the 2022 Johor state election as the BN candidate for Paloh and defeated defending MLA Sheikh Umar Bagharib Ali of Pakatan Harapan (PH) and two other candidates . He was sworn in as a Johor EXCO member on 26 March 2022.

== Election results ==
Johor State Legislative Assembly
Year	Constituency	Candidate	Votes	Pct	Opponent(s)	Votes	Pct	Ballots cast	Majority	Turnout%
2022	N30 Paloh	Lee Ting Han (MCA)	8,077	55.05%	Sheikh Umar Bagharib Ali (DAP)	4,901	33.41%	14,671	3,176	56.80%
2022	N30 Paloh	Lee Ting Han (MCA)	8,077	55.05%	Selvendran Velu (PAS)	1,512	10.31%	14,671	3,176	56.80%
2022	N30 Paloh	Lee Ting Han (MCA)	8,077	55.05%	Aminuddin Johari (PEJUANG)	181	1.23%	14,671	3,176	56.80%
