= Sheikh Umar Bagharib Ali =

Malaysian politician

- شيخ عمر باغريب علي

Chairman of the Malaysian Pineapple Industry Board
- Incumbent
- Assumed office 10 May 2023
- Minister: Mohamad Sabu
- Director General: Khairuzamri M. Salleh
- Preceded by: Sahruddin Jamal

Member of the Johor State Executive Council (Information, Entrepreneur Development, Co-operatives and Creative Economy : 16 May 2018–21 April 2019) (Youth, Sports, Entrepreneur Development and Co-operatives : 22 April 2019–27 February 2020)
- In office 16 May 2018 – 27 February 2020
- Monarch: Ibrahim Iskandar
- Menteri Besar: Osman Sapian (2018–2019); Sahruddin Jamal (2019–2020)
- Preceded by: Ayub Rahmat (Information); Ismail Mohamed (Entrepreneur Development, Co-operatives and Creative Economy)
- Succeeded by: Onn Hafiz Ghazi (Youth and Sports); Mohammad Izhar Ahmad (Entrepreneur Development and Co-operatives)
- Constituency: Paloh

Member of the Johor State Legislative Assembly for Paloh
- In office 9 May 2018 – 12 March 2022
- Preceded by: Teoh Yap Kun (BN–MCA)
- Succeeded by: Lee Ting Han (BN–MCA)
- Majority: 783 (2018)

State Vice Chairman of the Democratic Action Party of Johor
- Incumbent
- Assumed office 2 May 2021 Serving with Ramakrishnan Suppiah (2021–2024); Gan Peck Cheng (since 2024)
- Secretary-General: Lim Guan Eng (2021–2022); Anthony Loke Siew Fook (since 2022)
- State Chairman: Liew Chin Tong (2015–2024); Teo Nie Ching (since 2024)

Personal details
- Born: Sheikh Umar bin Bagharib Ali; 12 February 1985 (age 41) Kluang, Johor, Malaysia
- Citizenship: Malaysian
- Party: Malaysian Islamic Party (PAS) (until 2015); Democratic Action Party (DAP) (since 2015)
- Other political affiliations: Pakatan Rakyat (PR) (until 2015); Pakatan Harapan (PH) (since 2015)
- Education: University of Malaya (UM)
- Occupation: Politician

Sheikh Umar bin Bagharib Ali (born 12 February 1985) is a Malaysian politician who has served as Chairman of the Malaysian Pineapple Industry Board (MPIB) since May 2023. He served as Member of the Johor State Executive Council (EXCO) in the Pakatan Harapan (PH) state administration under former Menteris Besar Osman Sapian and Sahruddin Jamal from May 2018 to the collapse of the PH state administration in February 2020 as well as Member of the Johor State Legislative Assembly (MLA) for Paloh from May 2018 to March 2022. He is a member of the Democratic Action Party (DAP), a component party of the PH coalition. He is the Member of the Central Executive Committee (CEC) of DAP and State Vice Chairman of DAP of Johor.

== Election results ==
Johor State Legislative Assembly
Year	Constituency	Candidate	Votes	Pct	Opponent(s)	Votes	Pct	Ballots cast	Majority	Turnout
2018	N30 Paloh	Sheikh Umar Bagharib Ali (DAP)	8,958	52.10%	Teoh Yap Kun (MCA)	8,175	47.55%	17,633	783	82.40%
2018	N30 Paloh	Sheikh Umar Bagharib Ali (DAP)	8,958	52.10%	Shamugam Munusamy (IND)	61	0.35%	17,633	783	82.40%
2022	N30 Paloh	Sheikh Umar Bagharib Ali (DAP)	4,901	33.41%	Lee Ting Han (MCA)	8,077	55.05%	14,671	3,176	56.80%
2022	N30 Paloh	Sheikh Umar Bagharib Ali (DAP)	4,901	33.41%	Selvendran Velu (PAS)	1,512	10.31%	14,671	3,176	56.80%
2022	N30 Paloh	Sheikh Umar Bagharib Ali (DAP)	4,901	33.41%	Aminuddin Johari (PEJUANG)	181	1.23%	14,671	3,176	56.80%

Parliament of Malaysia
Year	Constituency	Candidate	Votes	Pct	Opponent(s)	Votes	Pct	Ballots cast	Majority	Turnout
2022	P148 Ayer Hitam	Sheikh Umar Bagharib Ali (DAP)	15,948	34.16%	Wee Ka Siong (MCA)	18,911	40.50%	47,172	2,963	76.49%
2022	P148 Ayer Hitam	Sheikh Umar Bagharib Ali (DAP)	15,948	34.16%	Muhammad Syafiq A Aziz (BERSATU)	11,833	25.34%	47,172	2,963	76.49%
