= Saraswathy Nallathamby =

Malaysian politician

Yang Berhormat Saraswati Nallathamby MLA

Member of the Johor State Legislative Assembly for Kemelah
- In office 12 March 2022 – 11 July 2026
- Preceded by: Sulaiman Mohd Nor
- Succeeded by: Raven Kumar Krishnasamy

Personal details
- Born: Saraswati A/P Nallathamby
- Citizenship: Malaysian
- Party: Malaysian Indian Congress (MIC)
- Occupation: Politician

Saraswati A/P Nallathamby is a Malaysian politician from the Malaysian Indian Congress (MIC). She has served as the Member of the Johor State Legislative Assembly for Kemelah since 2022. She has served as chief of the MIC Women's Wing for the 2024–2027 term.

== Election results ==
Johor State Legislative Assembly
Year	Constituency	Candidate	Votes	Pct.	Opponent(s)	Votes	Pct.	Ballots cast	Majority	Turnout
2022	N04 Kemelah	Saraswati Nallathamby (BN)	7,518	41.13%	Sulaiman Mohd Nor (PH)	5,907	32.32%	18,770	1,611	55.69%
2022	N04 Kemelah	Saraswati Nallathamby (BN)	7,518	41.13%	Normala Sudirman (PN)	4,639	25.38%	18,770	1,611	55.69%
2022	N04 Kemelah	Saraswati Nallathamby (BN)	7,518	41.13%	Norizan Sahardin (PEJUANG)	214	1.17%	18,770	1,611	55.69%
