= Benut (state constituency) =

Political subdivision in Malaysia

Benut (N53)
Johor constituency

State constituency
- Legislature: Johor State Legislative Assembly
MLA
Mohd Sumali Reduan
BN
- Constituency created: 1959
- First contested: 1959
- Last contested: 2026

Demographics
- Population ()2020: 29,033
- Electors (2026): 28,798
- Area (km²): 248

Benut is a state constituency in Johor, Malaysia, that is represented in the Johor State Legislative Assembly.

The state constituency was first contested in 1959 and is mandated to return a single Assemblyman to the Johor State Legislative Assembly under the first-past-the-post voting system.

== Demographics ==
As of 2020, Benut has a population of 29,033 people.

Ethnic breakdown of Benut's electorate as of 2026
1. Malay (81.3%)
2. Chinese (16.2%)
3. Other ethnicities (2.40%)
4. Indian (0.10%)

== History ==
=== Polling districts ===
According to the gazette issued on 2 July 2026, the Benut constituency has a total of 15 polling districts.

State constituency	Polling districts	Code	Location
Benut (N53)	Lubok Sipat	164/53/01	SK Seri Bahagia
Benut (N53)	Permatang Sepam	164/53/02	SK Seri Jaya
Benut (N53)	Parit Betak	164/53/03	SMK Parit Betak
Benut (N53)	Permatang Duku	164/53/04	SK Seri Setia
Benut (N53)	Parit Mansor	164/53/05	SK Parit Markom
Benut (N53)	Parit Ismail	164/53/06	SK Seri Kembar
Benut (N53)	Sri Jawa	164/53/07	SK Seri Al Ulum
Benut (N53)	Parit Satu	164/53/08	SK Seri Anom
Benut (N53)	Sanglang	164/53/09	SK Sanglang
Benut (N53)	Simpang Jawa	164/53/10	SJK (C) Lok Yu 1
Benut (N53)	Benut	164/53/11	SMK Sri Tanjung
Benut (N53)	Bandar Benut Utara	164/53/12	SMK Benut
Benut (N53)	Bandar Benut Selatan	164/53/13	SA Bandar Benut
Benut (N53)	Parit Abdul Rahman	164/53/14	SMA (Arab) Bugisiah
Benut (N53)	Tampok	164/53/15	SK Seri Sinaran

=== Representation history ===
Members of the Legislative Assembly for Benut
Assembly	No	Years	Member	Party
Constituency created
1st	N18	1959-1964	Bachok @ Abdul Majid Hashim	Alliance (UMNO)
2nd	N18	1964-1969	Bachok @ Abdul Majid Hashim	Alliance (UMNO)
		1969-1971	Assembly dissolved	
3rd	N18	1971–1973	Talib Ali	Alliance (UMNO)
3rd	N18	1973–1974	Talib Ali	BN (UMNO)
4th	N27	1974-1978	Jalok Daing Malibok	BN (UMNO)
5th	N27	1978-1982	Jalok Daing Malibok	BN (UMNO)
6th	N27	1982-1986	Hasmuni Salim	BN (UMNO)
7th	N24	1986-1990	Ahmad Selamat	BN (UMNO)
8th	N24	1990-1995	Khatijah Mat Som	BN (UMNO)
9th	N26	1995-1999	Saklon @ Salehon Sengot	BN (UMNO)
10th	N26	1999-2004	Saklon @ Salehon Sengot	BN (UMNO)
11th	N53	2004-2008	Salehan Sungot	BN (UMNO)
12th	N53	2008-2013	Hasni Mohammad	BN (UMNO)
13th	N53	2013-2018	Hasni Mohammad	BN (UMNO)
14th	N53	2018-2022	Hasni Mohammad	BN (UMNO)
15th	N53	2022–2026	Hasni Mohammad	BN (UMNO)
16th	N53	2026–present	Mohd Sumali Reduan	BN (UMNO)

== Election results ==
Johor state election, 2026
Party	Candidate	Votes	%	∆%
BN	Mohd Sumali Reduan	18,492	86.89	▲23.81
PH	Abdul Razak Ismail	2,791	13.11	▲13.11
Total valid votes		21,283	100.00	
Total rejected ballots		239		
Unreturned ballots		42		
Turnout		21,564	74.88	▲12.11
Registered electors		28,798		
Majority		15,701	73.77	▲39.85
BN hold		Swing		

Johor state election, 2022
Party	Candidate	Votes	%	∆%
BN	Hasni Mohammad	10,896	63.08	▲7.65
PN	Isa Ab Hamid	5,037	29.16	▲29.16
PKR	Haniff Ghazali Hosman	1,200	6.95	▼22.48
PEJUANG	Iskandar Noor Ibrahim	139	0.08	▲0.08
Total valid votes		17,272	100.00	
Total rejected ballots		300		
Unreturned ballots		106		
Turnout		17,678	62.80	▼20.77
Registered electors		28,165		
Majority		5,859	33.92	▲7.92
BN hold		Swing		

Johor state election, 2018
Party	Candidate	Votes	%	∆%
BN	Hasni Mohammad	9,480	55.43	▼12.68
PKR	Zulklifly Tasrep	5,033	29.43	▲29.43
PAS	Firdaus Jaffar	2,590	15.14	▼16.75
Total valid votes		17,103	100.00	
Total rejected ballots		358		
Unreturned ballots		289		
Turnout		17,750	84.95	▼1.82
Registered electors		20,894		
Majority		4,447	26.00	▼10.22
BN hold		Swing		
undi.info

Johor state election, 2013: Benut
Party	Candidate	Votes	%	∆%
BN	Hasni Mohammad	12,358	68.11	▼4.58
PAS	Sarobo Ponoh	5,786	31.89	▲4.58
Total valid votes		18,144	100.00	
Total rejected ballots		446		
Unreturned ballots		34		
Turnout		18,624	86.77	▲9.67
Registered electors		21,463		
Majority		6,572	36.22	▼9.16
BN hold		Swing		
undi.info

Johor state election, 2008: Benut
Party	Candidate	Votes	%	∆%
BN	Hasni Mohammad	10,098	72.69	▼6.20
PAS	Sarobo Ponoh	3,794	27.31	▲6.20
Total valid votes		13,892	100.00	
Total rejected ballots		457		
Unreturned ballots		27		
Turnout		14,376	77.10	▲1.64
Registered electors		18,646		
Majority		6,304	45.38	▼12.40
BN hold		Swing		
undi.info

Johor state election, 2004
Party	Candidate	Votes	%	∆%
BN	Salehon Sengot	11,238	78.89	▲7.09
PAS	Azlisham Azahar	3,007	21.11	▼7.09
Total valid votes		14,245	100.00	
Total rejected ballots		437		
Unreturned ballots		16		
Turnout		14,698	75.46	▲2.14
Registered electors		19,478		
Majority		8,231	57.78	▲14.18
BN hold		Swing		

Johor state election, 1999
Party	Candidate	Votes	%	∆%
BN	Salehon Sengot	11,970	71.80	▼8.65
PAS	Salahuddin Ayub	4,701	28.20	▲8.65
Total valid votes		16,671	100.00	
Total rejected ballots		613		
Unreturned ballots		2		
Turnout		17,286	73.32	▲1.18
Registered electors		23,575		
Majority		7,269	43.60	▼17.30
BN hold		Swing		

Johor state election, 1995
Party	Candidate	Votes	%	∆%
BN	Salehon Sengot	12,630	80.45	▲13.16
PAS	Ambok Masek Abdul Latif	3,069	19.55	▼13.16
Total valid votes		15,699	100.00	
Total rejected ballots		597		
Unreturned ballots		60		
Turnout		16,356	72.14	▲0.30
Registered electors		22,673		
Majority		9,561	60.90	▲26.32
BN hold		Swing		

Johor state election, 1990
Party	Candidate	Votes	%	∆%
BN	Khatijah binti Mohd. Som	9,439	67.29	▼12.07
PAS	Ambok Masek Abdul Latif	4,588	32.71	▲12.07
Total valid votes		14,027	100.00	
Total rejected ballots		1,127		
Unreturned ballots		27		
Turnout		15,181	71.84	▲0.06
Registered electors		21,133		
Majority		4,851	34.58	▼24.13
BN hold		Swing		

Johor state election, 1986
Party	Candidate	Votes	%	∆%
BN	Ahmad Selamat	10,991	79.36	▼7.60
PAS	Mohamed Turus Daing Melebeh	2,859	20.64	▲7.60
Total valid votes		13,850	100.00	
Total rejected ballots		934		
Unreturned ballots		0		
Turnout		14,784	71.77	▼4.21
Registered electors		20,598		
Majority		8,132	58.71	▼15.20
BN hold		Swing		

Johor state election, 1982
Party	Candidate	Votes	%	∆%
BN	Hasmoni Salim	14,286	86.96	
PAS	Melatu Samsi Suhadah	2,143	13.04	
Total valid votes		16,429	100.00	
Total rejected ballots		426		
Unreturned ballots		0		
Turnout		16,855	75.99	▲75.99
Registered electors		22,182		
Majority		12,143	73.91	▲73.91
BN hold		Swing		

Johor state election, 1978
Party	Candidate	Votes	%	∆%
On the nomination day, Jalok Daing Malibok won uncontested.
BN	Jalok Daing Malibok			
Total valid votes				
Total rejected ballots				
Unreturned ballots				
Turnout				
Registered electors		18,968		
Majority				
BN hold		Swing		

Johor state election, 1974
Party	Candidate	Votes	%	∆%
BN	Jalok Daing Malibok	9,418	78.69	▲13.81
Independent	Mohd. Jufri Tahir	2,551	21.31	▲2.93
Total valid votes		11,969	100.00	
Total rejected ballots		508		
Unreturned ballots		0		
Turnout		12,477	75.85	▲0.79
Registered electors		16,449		
Majority		6,867	57.37	▲10.87
BN gain from Alliance		Swing		-

Johor state election, 1969
Party	Candidate	Votes	%	∆%
Alliance	Talib Ali	6,318	64.88	▲0.46
Independent	M. Amin Hanan	1,790	18.38	▼6.89
PMIP	Mohamed Turus Daing Melebeh	1,630	16.74	▲6.43
Total valid votes		9,738	100.00	
Total rejected ballots		1,515		
Unreturned ballots		0		
Turnout		11,253	75.07	▼7.11
Registered electors		14,991		
Majority		4,528	46.50	▲7.34
Alliance hold		Swing		

Johor state election, 1964
Party	Candidate	Votes	%	∆%
Alliance	Bachok Hashim	6,626	64.42	▲7.66
Independent	Yeo Lin Thiam	2,599	25.27	▼4.79
PMIP	Yusoff Abd. Hakim	1,060	10.31	▼2.87
Total valid votes		10,285	100.00	
Total rejected ballots		916		
Unreturned ballots		0		
Turnout		11,201	82.18	▲4.08
Registered electors		13,630		
Majority		4,027	39.15	▲12.45
Alliance hold		Swing		

Johor state election, 1959
Party	Candidate	Votes	%
Alliance	Bachok Hashim	4,778	56.77
Independent	Yeo Lin Thiam	2,530	30.06
PMIP	Ab. Latif Othman	1,109	13.18
Total valid votes		8,417	100.00
Total rejected ballots		518	
Unreturned ballots		0	
Turnout		8,935	78.10
Registered electors		11,440	
Majority		2,248	26.71
This was a new constituency created.
