= Bukit Kepong (state constituency) =

Political subdivision in Malaysia

Bukit Kepong (N07)
Johor constituency

State constituency
- Legislature: Johor State Legislative Assembly
MLA
Ahmad Syar'e Yusof
BN
- Constituency created: 2018
- First contested: 2018
- Last contested: 2026

Demographics
- Population (2020): 34,670
- Electors (2026): 37,683
- Area (km²): 1,023

Bukit Kepong is a state constituency in Johor, Malaysia, that is represented in the Johor State Legislative Assembly.

The state constituency was first contested in 2018 and is mandated to return a single Assemblyman to the Johor State Legislative Assembly under the first-past-the-post voting system.

== Demographics ==
As of 2020, Bukit Kepong has a population of 34,670 people.

Ethnic breakdown of Bukit Kepong's electorate as of 2026
1. Malay (70.6%)
2. Chinese (25.2%)
3. Indian (2.60%)
4. Other ethnicities (1.60%)

== History ==
=== Polling districts ===
According to the federal gazette issued on 2 July 2026, the Bukit Kepong constituency has a total of 27 polling districts.

State constituency	Polling Districts	Code	Location
Bukit Kepong（N07）	Bandar Bukit Kepong	143/07/01	SJK (C) Kepong
Bukit Kepong（N07）	FELCRA Paya Kepar	143/07/02	SK FELCRA Bukit Kepong
Bukit Kepong（N07）	Ma'Okil	143/07/03	SK LKTP Ma'Okil 1
Bukit Kepong（N07）	Bukit Kepong	143/07/04	SK Bukit Kepong
Bukit Kepong（N07）	Lenga Utara	143/07/05	SK Lenga
Bukit Kepong（N07）	Lenga Selatan	143/07/06	SJK (C) Lenga
Bukit Kepong（N07）	Kampong Bahru	143/07/07	SA Kampung Baru Batu 28
Bukit Kepong（N07）	Lenga	143/07/08	SK LKTP Batu 27
Bukit Kepong（N07）	Kampong Gombang	143/07/09	SK Gombang
Bukit Kepong（N07）	Liang Batu	143/07/10	SK Liang Batu
Bukit Kepong（N07）	Lenga Road	143/07/11	SJK (C) Renchong
Bukit Kepong（N07）	Pagoh	143/07/12	SMK Sultan Alauddin Riayat Shah 1
Bukit Kepong（N07）	Bandar Pagoh Utara	143/07/13	SJK (C) Soon Mong
Bukit Kepong（N07）	Bandar Pagoh Selatan	143/07/14	SA Pekan Pagoh
Bukit Kepong（N07）	Paya Redan	143/07/15	SK Paya Redan
Bukit Kepong（N07）	Kampong Teratai	143/07/16	SJK (C) Lian Hwa
Bukit Kepong（N07）	Sri Ledang	143/07/17	SK RKT Sri Ledang
Bukit Kepong（N07）	FELDA Sri Jaya	143/07/18	SMK Tun Sri Lanang
Bukit Kepong（N07）	Durian Chondong	143/07/19	SK Durian Chondong
Bukit Kepong（N07）	Kundang Ulu	143/07/20	SMK Tengku Temenggong Ahmad
Bukit Kepong（N07）	Ladang Serampang	143/07/21	SJK (C) Lian Hwa
Bukit Kepong（N07）	Parit Raja	143/07/22	SK Bukit Rahmat
Bukit Kepong（N07）	Bandar Grisek Timor	143/07/23	SK Gersek
Bukit Kepong（N07）	Kampong Kundang Ulu	143/07/24	SK Kundang Ulu
Bukit Kepong（N07）	Ladang Nordanal	143/07/25	SJK (T) Ladang Nordanal
Bukit Kepong（N07）	Kebun Bahru	153/07/26	SJK (C) Kebun Bahru
Bukit Kepong（N07）	Grisek	143/07/27	SJK (C) Pei Eng

=== Representation history ===
Members of the Legislative Assembly for Bukit Kepong
Assembly	No	Years	Member	Party
Constituency created from Bukit Serampang, Jorak and Bukit Naning
14th	N07	2018–2020	Sahruddin Jamal	PH (BERSATU)
14th	N07	2020–2022	Sahruddin Jamal	PN (BERSATU)
15th	N07	2022–2026	Sahruddin Jamal	PN (BERSATU)
16th	N07	2026-present	Ahmad Syar'e Yusof	BN (UMNO)

== Election results ==
Johor state election, 2026
Party	Candidate	Votes	%	∆%
BN	Ahmad Syar'e Yusof	16,386	61.42	▲17.15
PN	Sahruddin Jamal	5,625	21.08	▼23.19
PH	Subramani Chami	4,667	17.49	▲17.49
Total valid votes		26,678	100.00	
Total rejected ballots		278		
Unreturned ballots		32		
Turnout		26,988	71.62	▲10.61
Registered electors		37,683		
Majority		10,761	40.34	▲37.15
BN gain from PN		Swing		?

Johor state election, 2022
Party	Candidate	Votes	%	∆%
PN	Sahruddin Jamal	9,873	44.27	▲44.27
BN	Ismail Mohamed	9,163	41.08	▼2.55
MUDA	Afiqah Zulkifli	3,076	13.79	▲13.79
PEJUANG	Md Taib Suhut	191	0.86	▲0.86
Total valid votes		22,303	100.00	
Total rejected ballots		486		
Unreturned ballots		85		
Turnout		22,874	61.01	▼22.99
Registered electors		37,495		
Majority		710	3.19	▼2.16
PN gain from PKR		Swing		?

Johor state election, 2018
Party	Candidate	Votes	%
PKR	Sahruddin Jamal	11,665	48.98
BN	Mohd Noor Taib	10,392	43.63
PAS	Muhamad Nur Iqbal Abd Razak	1,761	7.39
Total valid votes		23,818	100.00
Total rejected ballots		383	
Unreturned ballots		0	
Turnout		24,352	84.00
Registered electors		28,992	
Majority		1,273	5.35
This was a new constituency created
