= Ayub Rahmat =

Malaysian politician (born 1969)

Yang Berbahagia Datuk Ayub Rahmat DPSM AMN PPN PSI II
- أيوب بن رحمة

Johor State Executive Councillor (Health and Environment : 9 July 2013–12 March 2017) (Health, Environment, Education and Information : 12 March 2017–12 May 2018)
- In office 9 July 2013 – 12 May 2018
- Monarch: Ibrahim Ismail
- Menteri Besar: Mohamed Khaled Nordin
- Preceded by: Robia Kosai (Health); Tan Kok Hong (Environment)
- Succeeded by: Sahruddin Jamal (Health and Environment); Aminolhuda Hassan (Education); Sheikh Umar Bagharib Ali (Information)
- Constituency: Kemelah

Member of the Johor State Legislative Assembly for Kemelah
- In office 21 March 2004 – 9 May 2018
- Preceded by: Constituency Established
- Succeeded by: Sulaiman Mohd Nor (AMANAH–PH)
- Majority: 7,047 (2004); 5,435 (2008); 2,260 (2013)

Personal details
- Born: 25 May 1969 (age 56) Johor, Malaysia
- Citizenship: Malaysian
- Party: United Malays National Organisation (UMNO)
- Other political affiliations: Barisan Nasional (BN)
- Occupation: Politician

Ayub bin Rahmat (born 25 May 1969) is a Malaysian politician. He was a member of Johor State Legislative Assembly for Kemelah from 2004 to 2018. He is a member of the United Malays National Organisation (UMNO), a component party of Barisan Nasional (BN) coalition.

== Election results ==
Johor State Legislative Assembly
Year	Constituency	Candidate	Votes	Pct	Opponent(s)	Votes	Pct	Ballots cast	Majority	Turnout
2004	N04 Kemelah	Ayub Rahmat (UMNO)	8,909	82.71%	Suleiman Shuib (PAS)	1,862	17.29%	11,031	7,047	75.66%
2008	N04 Kemelah	Ayub Rahmat (UMNO)	8,639	72.95%	Mohd Barudin Nor (PKR)	3,204	27.05%	12,082	5,435	76.55%
2013	N04 Kemelah	Ayub Rahmat (UMNO)	9,917	56.43%	Natrah Ismail (PKR)	7,657	43.57%	17,803	2,260	87.20%

Parliament of Malaysia
Year	Constituency	Candidate	Votes	Pct	Opponent(s)	Votes	Pct	Ballots cast	Majority	Turnout
2018	P141 Sekijang	Ayub Rahmat (UMNO)	18,278	48.31%	Natrah Ismail (PKR)	19,559	51.69%	38,395	1,281	84.97%

== Honours ==
- Malaysia
  - Member of the Order of the Defender of the Realm (AMN) (2008)
  - Medal of the Order of the Defender of the Realm (PPN) (2007)
- Johor
  - Second Class of the Sultan Ibrahim of Johor Medal (PSI II) (2015)
- Malacca
  - Companion Class II of the Exalted Order of Malacca (DPSM) – Datuk (2010)
