= Baharum Mohamed =

Malaysian politician

Yang Berbahagia Datuk Baharum Mohamed DMSM AMN
- بحرهاروم محمد

Member of the Malaysian Parliament for Sekijang
- In office 21 March 2004 – 5 May 2013
- Preceded by: New constituency
- Succeeded by: Anuar Abdul Manap (BN–UMNO)
- Majority: 14,842 (2004); 9,867 (2008)

Personal details
- Born: 4 February 1957 (age 69) Johor, Federation of Malaya (now Malaysia)
- Party: United Malays National Organisation (UMNO)
- Other political affiliations: Barisan Nasional (BN); Perikatan Nasional (PN); Muafakat Nasional (MN)
- Occupation: Politician

Baharum bin Mohamed (born 4 February 1957) was the Member of the Parliament of Malaysia for the Sekijang constituency in the state of Johor from 2004 to 2013. He sat in Parliament as a member of the United Malays National Organisation (UMNO) in the governing Barisan Nasional coalition.

== Election results ==
Parliament of Malaysia
| Year | Constituency | Candidate | Votes | Pct | Opponent(s) | Votes | Pct | Ballots cast | Majority | Turnout |
|---|---|---|---|---|---|---|---|---|---|---|
| 2004 | P141 Sekijang | Baharum Mohamed (UMNO) | 19,628 | 80.40% | Zulkaply Salleh (PKR) | 4,786 | 19.60% | 24,414 | 14,842 | 72.67% |
| 2008 | P141 Sekijang | Baharum Mohamed (UMNO) | 17,979 | 68.91% | Zulkaply Salleh (PKR) | 8,112 | 31.09% | 26,716 | 9,867 | 76.03% |

== Honours ==
- Malaysia
  - Member of the Order of the Defender of the Realm (AMN) (2005)
- Malacca
  - Companion Class I of the Exalted Order of Malacca (DMSM) – Datuk (2006)
