= Paloh (Johor state constituency) =

Political subdivision in Malaysia

Paloh (N30)
Johor constituency

State constituency
- Legislature: Johor State Legislative Assembly
MLA
Lee Ting Han
BN
- Constituency created: 1984
- First contested: 1986
- Last contested: 2026

Demographics
- Population (2020): 32,407
- Electors (2026): 25,419
- Area (km²): 928

Paloh is a state constituency in Johor, Malaysia, that is represented in the Johor State Legislative Assembly.

The state constituency was first contested in 1986 and is mandated to return a single Assemblyman to the Johor State Legislative Assembly under the first-past-the-post voting system.

== Demographics ==
Ethnic breakdown of Paloh's electorate as of 2026
1. Malay (47.1%)
2. Chinese (34.8%)
3. Indian (15.4%)
4. Other ethnicities (2.80%)

== History ==
=== Polling districts ===
According to the gazette issued on 2 July 2026, the Paloh constituency has a total of 19 polling districts.

State constituency	Polling districts	Code	Location
Paloh（N30）	Klebang	153/30/01	Dewan Orang Ramai Ladang Kempas Klebang
Paloh（N30）	Kampong Melayu Paloh	153/30/02	SK Bukit Paloh
Paloh（N30）	Ladang Paloh	153/30/03	Balai Raya Ladang Paloh
Paloh（N30）	Paloh	153/30/04	SMK Paloh
Paloh（N30）	Bandar Paloh Utara	153/30/05	SJK (C) Paloh
Paloh（N30）	Bandar Paloh Selatan	153/30/06	SK Bandar Paloh
Paloh（N30）	Kampong Muhibbah	153/30/07	SA Bandar Paloh
Paloh（N30）	Kali Malaya	153/30/08	SJK (C) Yu Ming
Paloh（N30）	Bukit Paloh	153/30/09	Dewan Orang Ramai Ladang Bukit Paloh
Paloh（N30）	Ladang Landak	153/30/10	Dewan Komuniti Ladang Landak
Paloh（N30）	Ladang Kekayaan	153/30/11	Balai Raya Ladang Kekayaan
Paloh（N30）	Chamek	152/30/12	Dewan Seberguna Chamek
Paloh（N30）	Consolidated Eastern Planations	153/30/13	SJK (C) Lit Terk
Paloh（N30）	Tereh Selatan	153/30/14	SK Ladang Tereh
Paloh（N30）	Pengkalan Tereh	150/30/15	SK Pengkalan Tereh
Paloh（N30）	Ladang Pamol	150/30/16	SK Ladang Pamol
Paloh（N30）	Pekan Kampong Gajah	153/30/17	SJK (C) Kampung Gajah
Paloh（N30）	Kampong Gajah	150/30/18	SJK (C) Kampong Gajah
Paloh（N30）	FELDA Kahang Barat	150/38/19	SK (FELDA) Kahang Barat

=== Representation history ===
Members of the Legislative Assembly for Paloh
Assembly	No	Years	Member	Party
Constituency created from Bandar Keluang, Bekok and Sri Lalang
7th	N11	1986-1990	Pang Tong Yong (馮東陽)	BN (MCA)
8th	N11	1990-1995	Hoo Seong Chang (何襄贊)	BN (MCA)
9th	N11	1995-1999	Choong Ah Onn @ Chong Ah Owon (張雅安)	BN (MCA)
10th	N11	1999-2004	Choong Ah Onn @ Chong Ah Owon (張雅安)	BN (MCA)
11th	N30	2004-2008	Choong Ah Onn @ Chong Ah Owon (張雅安)	BN (MCA)
12th	N30	2008-2013	Hoo Seong Chang (何襄贊)	BN (MCA)
13th	N30	2013–2018	Teoh Yap Kun (張協群)	BN (MCA)
14th	N30	2018-2022	Sheikh Umar Bagharib Ali	PH (DAP)
15th	N30	2022–2026	Lee Ting Han (李廷漢)	BN (MCA)
16th	N30	2026-present	Lee Ting Han (李廷漢)	BN (MCA)

== Election results ==
Johor state election, 2026
Party	Candidate	Votes	%	∆%
BN	Lee Ting Han	11,181	66.40	▲11.35
PH	Ruben Arumugum	4,982	29.59	▼3.82
PN	Jeevakumar Dayalan	571	3.39	▼6.92
Independent	Kamaleswaren Ganabathy	105	0.62	
Total valid votes		16,839	100.00	
Total rejected ballots		289		
Unreturned ballots		13		
Turnout		17,141	67.43	▲8.68
Registered electors		25,419		
Majority		6,199	36.81	▲15.17
BN hold		Swing		?

Johor state election, 2022
Party	Candidate	Votes	%	∆%
BN	Lee Ting Han	8,077	55.05	▲7.51
PH	Sheikh Umar Bagharib Ali	4,901	33.41	▲33.41
PN	Selvendran Velu	1,512	10.31	▲10.31
PEJUANG	Aminuddin Johari	181	1.23	▲1.23
Total valid votes		14,671	100.00	
Total rejected ballots		424		
Unreturned ballots		81		
Turnout		15,176	58.75	▼23.65
Registered electors		25,831		
Majority		3,176	21.65	▲17.09
BN gain from PKR		Swing		?

Johor state election, 2018: Paloh
Party	Candidate	Votes	%	∆%
PKR	Sheikh Omar Bagharib Ali	8,958	52.10	▲52.10
BN	Teoh Yap Kun	8,175	47.55	▼2.80
Independent	Shamugam Munisamy	61	0.35	▲0.35
Total valid votes		17,194	100.00	
Total rejected ballots		366		
Unreturned ballots		73		
Turnout		17,633	82.40	▼1.99
Registered electors		21,399		
Majority		783	4.55	▲3.87
PKR gain from BN		Swing		-

Johor state election, 2013: Paloh
Party	Candidate	Votes	%	∆%
BN	Teoh Yap Kun	7,531	50.34	▼12.15
DAP	Shanker Rengganathan	7,428	49.66	▲12.15
Total valid votes		14,959	100.00	
Total rejected ballots		403		
Unreturned ballots		16		
Turnout		15,378	84.39	▲12.50
Registered electors		18,222		
Majority		103	0.69	▼24.30
BN hold		Swing		

Johor state election, 2008: Paloh
Party	Candidate	Votes	%	∆%
BN	Hoo Seong Chang	6,988	62.49	▼11.58
DAP	Tan Ting Chow	4,194	37.51	▲11.58
Total valid votes		11,182	100.00	
Total rejected ballots		360		
Unreturned ballots		21		
Turnout		11,563	71.89	▲1.62
Registered electors		16,084		
Majority		2,794	24.99	▼23.15
BN hold		Swing		

Johor state election, 2004: Paloh
Party	Candidate	Votes	%	∆%
BN	Freddie Chong Ah Onn	7,967	74.07	▲3.06
DAP	Ng Lam Swa	2,789	25.93	▼3.06
Total valid votes		10,756	100.00	
Total rejected ballots		384		
Unreturned ballots		13		
Turnout		11,153	70.27	▼4.05
Registered electors		15,871		
Majority		5,178	48.14	▲6.12
BN hold		Swing		

Johor state election, 1999: Paloh
Party	Candidate	Votes	%	∆%
BN	Freddie Chong Ah Onn	16,867	71.01	▼2.93
DAP	Albert Chai	6,886	28.99	▲2.93
Total valid votes		23,753	100.00	
Total rejected ballots		717		
Unreturned ballots		2,810		
Turnout		27,280	74.32	▲0.59
Registered electors		36,704		
Majority		9,981	42.02	▼5.85
BN hold		Swing		

Johor state election, 1995: Paloh
Party	Candidate	Votes	%	∆%
BN	Freddie Chong Ah Onn	17,806	73.94	▲17.80
DAP	Eng Ah Kau	6,277	26.06	▼17.80
Total valid votes		24,083	100.00	
Total rejected ballots		733		
Unreturned ballots		813		
Turnout		25,629	73.73	▼1.23
Registered electors		34,759		
Majority		11,529	47.87	▲35.61
BN hold		Swing		

Johor state election, 1990: Paloh
Party	Candidate	Votes	%	∆%
BN	Hoo Seong Chang	15,486	56.13	▲1.16
DAP	Lim Kwi Siam	12,102	43.87	▼1.16
Total valid votes		27,588	100.00	
Total rejected ballots		818		
Unreturned ballots		531		
Turnout		28,937	74.96	▲3.66
Registered electors		38,602		
Majority		3,384	12.27	▲2.32
BN hold		Swing		

Johor state election, 1986: Paloh
Party	Candidate	Votes	%
BN	Pang Tong Yong	12,179	54.97
DAP	Lim Kwi Siam	9,975	45.03
Total valid votes		22,154	100.00
Total rejected ballots		1,005	
Unreturned ballots		0	
Turnout		23,159	71.30
Registered electors		32,482	
Majority		2,204	9.95
This was a new constituency created.
