= Paloh (disambiguation) =

Paloh is a mukim in Malaysia.

Paloh may also refer to:

- Paloh (federal constituency), formerly represented in the Dewan Rakyat (1978–1990)
- Paloh (Kelantan state constituency), represented in the Kelantan State Legislative Assembly
- Paloh (Johor state constituency), represented in the Johor State Legislative Assembly
- Paloh (film), 2003 Malaysian historical film

== See also ==
- Surya Paloh (born 1951), Indonesian businessman and politician
