= Sahruddin Jamal =

Malaysian politician and doctor (born 1975)

Yang Berbahagia Dato' Sahruddin Jamal DMIJ
- سحرالدين جمال

17th Menteri Besar of Johor
- In office 14 April 2019 – 27 February 2020
- Monarch: Ibrahim Iskandar
- Preceded by: Osman Sapian
- Succeeded by: Hasni Mohammad
- Constituency: Bukit Kepong

Member of the Johor State Executive Council (Health, Environment & Agriculture)
- In office 16 May 2018 – 14 April 2019
- Monarch: Ibrahim Iskandar
- Menteri Besar: Osman Sapian
- Preceded by: Ayub Rahmat (Health and Environment); Ismail Mohamed (Agriculture)
- Succeeded by: Mohd Khuzzan Abu Bakar (Health); Tan Chen Choon (Environment); Tosrin Jarvanthi (Agriculture)
- Constituency: Bukit Kepong

Chairman of the Malaysian Pineapple Industry Board
- In office 31 May 2020 – 15 December 2022
- Minister: Ronald Kiandee (2020–2022); Mohamad Sabu (3–15 December 2022)
- Director General: Ruhaida Mashhor
- Preceded by: Abdul Malik Abul Kassim
- Succeeded by: Sheikh Umar Bagharib Ali

State Chairman of the Malaysian United Indigenous Party of Johor
- Incumbent
- Assumed office 8 June 2022
- President: Muhyiddin Yassin
- Deputy: Mohd Rashid Hasnon
- Preceded by: Muhyiddin Yassin

Member of the Johor State Legislative Assembly for Bukit Kepong
- In office 9 May 2018 – 11 July 2026
- Preceded by: Position established
- Succeeded by: Ahmad Syar'e Yusof (BN–UMNO)
- Majority: 1,273 (2018); 710 (2022)

Personal details
- Born: Sahruddin bin Jamal; 26 May 1975 (age 51) Kampung Baru Batu 28, Lenga, Muar, Johor, Malaysia
- Citizenship: Malaysian
- Party: Malaysian United Indigenous Party (BERSATU)
- Other political affiliations: Pakatan Harapan (PH) (2017–2020); Perikatan Nasional (PN) (since 2020)
- Spouse: Nila Armila Mukdan
- Education: Hasanuddin University (MD)
- Occupation: Politician
- Profession: Doctor
- Website: Sahruddin Jamal on Facebook

Sahruddin bin Jamal (born 26 May 1975) is a Malaysian politician and doctor who served served as the 17th Menteri Besar of Johor from April 2019 to the collapse of the Pakatan Harapan (PH) state administration in February 2020, Member of the Johor State Executive Council (EXCO) in the PH state administration under former Menteri Besar Osman Sapian from May 2018 to his promotion to the Menteri Besarship in April 2019, Member of the Johor State Legislative Assembly (MLA) for Bukit Kepong from May 2018 to July 2026 as well as Chairman of the Malaysian Pineapple Industry Board (MPIB) from May 2020 to December 2022. He is a member of the Malaysian United Indigenous Party (BERSATU), a component party of the Perikatan Nasional (PN) and formerly PH coalitions. He has served as State Chairman of BERSATU of Johor since June 2022. He was the State Secretary of BERSATU of Johor prior to his promotion to State Chairman. He is also the shortest-serving Menteri Besar of Johor in the history, in office for only 321 days.

== Background ==
Sahruddin was born on 26 May 1975 to a peasant family at Kampung Baru Batu 28, Lenga, Muar, Johor. He formerly studied at Sekolah Menengah Kebangsaan (SMK) Sultan Alauddin Riayat Shah 1, Pagoh. He holds a Bachelor of Medicine, Bachelor of Surgery (MBBS) degree from Universitas Hasanuddin, Makassar, South Sulawesi, Indonesia. He previously had worked as a Medical Doctor at the Sultanah Fatimah Specialist Hospital (HPSF), Muar for five years and later operated his own three clinics, Klinik Dr Sahruddin, at Bukit Pasir, Bandar Universiti Pagoh and Pagoh in Muar before entering politics.

Sahruddin married Datin Dr. Nila Armila Mukdan who is also a doctor and they have three daughters.

== Political career ==
In the 2018 Johor state election, he made his electoral debut after being nominated by PH to contest for the Bukit Kepong state seat. He won the seat and was elected to the Johor State Legislative Assembly as the Bukit Kepong MLA for the first term. On 16 May 2018, Sahruddin was appointed Johor EXCO Member in charge of Health, Environment and Agriculture.

On 14 April 2019, Sahruddin was promoted to the Menteri Besarship to replace his predecessor Osman Sapian who resigned after just 11 months serving in that position.

On 28 February 2020, he was replaced by Hasni Mohammad of Barisan Nasional (BN) after the collapse of PH state administration during the 2020 Malaysian political crisis.

After leaving office as the Menteri Besar of Johor, Sahruddin was appointed Chairman of MPIB on 31 May 2020.

On 15 December 2022, the political appointment of Sahruddin as the Chairman of MPIB was terminated.

In the 2022 Johor state election, Sahruddin was renominated by PN to defend the Bukit Kepong seat. He defended the seat and was reelected to the Johor Assembly as the Bukit Kepong MLA for the second term.

On 30 December 2025, Sahruddin announced his resignation as the Johor PN chief of Perikatan Nasional (PN), following the resignation of PN president Muhyiddin Yassin.

== Election results ==
Johor State Legislative Assembly
Year	Constituency	Candidate	Votes	Pct	Opponent(s)	Votes	Pct	Ballots cast	Majority	Turnout
2018	N07 Bukit Kepong	Sahruddin Jamal (BERSATU)	11,665	47.90%	Mohd Noor Taib (UMNO)	10,392	42.67%	24,352	1,273	84.00%
2018	N07 Bukit Kepong	Sahruddin Jamal (BERSATU)	11,665	47.90%	Muhd Nur Iqbal; Abd Razak (PAS)	2,321	9.53%	24,352	1,273	84.00%
2022	N07 Bukit Kepong	Sahruddin Jamal (BERSATU)	9,873	43.86%	Ismail Mohamed (UMNO)	9,163	41.08%	22,303	710	59.48%
2022	N07 Bukit Kepong	Sahruddin Jamal (BERSATU)	9,873	43.86%	Afiqah Zulkifli (MUDA)	3,076	13.79%	22,303	710	59.48%
2022	N07 Bukit Kepong	Sahruddin Jamal (BERSATU)	9,873	43.86%	Md. Taib Md. Suhut (PEJUANG)	191	0.86%	22,303	710	59.48%
2026	N07 Bukit Kepong	Sahruddin Jamal (BERSATU)	5,625	21.08%	Ahmad Syar'e Yusof (UMNO)	16,386	61.42%	26,678	10,761	70.80%
2026	N07 Bukit Kepong	Sahruddin Jamal (BERSATU)	5,625	21.08%	Subramani Chami (PKR)	4,667	17.49%	26,678	10,761	70.80%

== Honours ==
Sultan Ibrahim of Johor conferred on Sahruddin the award Darjah Sultan Ibrahim Johor Yang Amat Disanjungi Pangkat Kedua Dato' Mulia Sultan Ibrahim Johor (DMIJ) on 22 April 2019 upon his appointment as Menteri Besar.

=== Honours of Malaysia ===
- Johor
  - Knight of the Order of Sultan Ibrahim of Johor (DMIJ) – Dato' (2019)

== See also ==
- Bukit Kepong (state constituency)

Political offices
Preceded by Osman Sapian	17th Menteri Besar of Johor; 2019–2020	Succeeded by Hasni Mohammad
