= Zaliha Mustafa =

Malaysian politician and physician

Yang Berhormat Datuk Seri Dr. Zaliha Mustafa SMW MP
- زاليحا بنت مصطفى
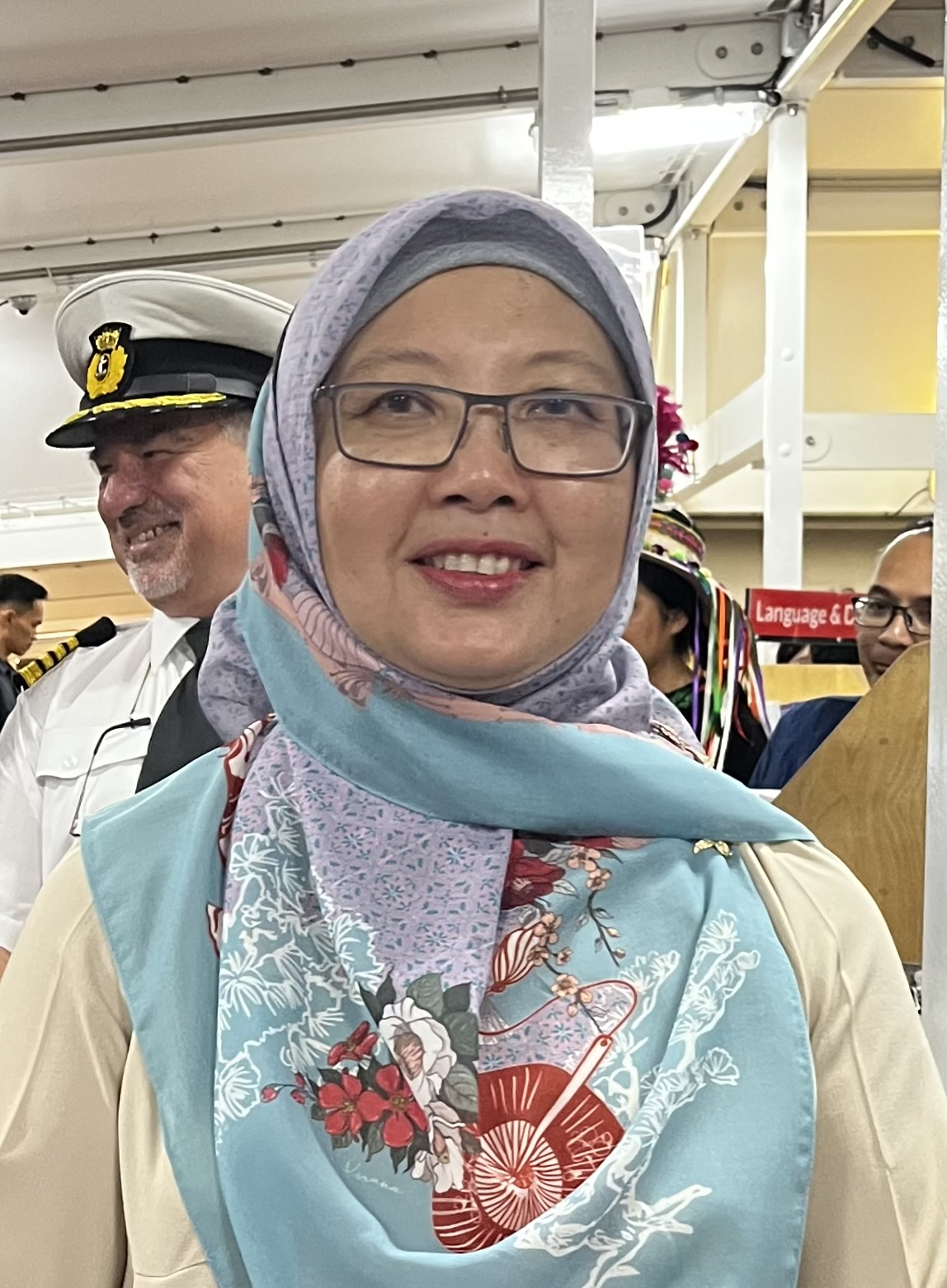
- Zaliha in 2025

Minister in the Prime Minister's Department (Federal Territories)
- In office 12 December 2023 – 17 December 2025
- Monarchs: Abdullah (2023–2024); Ibrahim (since 2024)
- Prime Minister: Anwar Ibrahim
- Preceded by: Shahidan Kassim
- Succeeded by: Hannah Yeoh Tseow Suan
- Constituency: Sekijang

Minister of Health
- In office 3 December 2022 – 12 December 2023
- Monarch: Abdullah
- Prime Minister: Anwar Ibrahim
- Deputy: Lukanisman Awang Sauni
- Preceded by: Khairy Jamaluddin
- Succeeded by: Dzulkefly Ahmad
- Constituency: Sekijang

Chairperson of the Government Backbenchers Club
- Incumbent
- Assumed office 21 January 2026
- Monarch: Ibrahim
- Prime Minister: Anwar Ibrahim
- Preceded by: Mohd Shahar Abdullah
- Constituency: Sekijang

Vice President of the People's Justice Party
- Incumbent
- Assumed office 6 June 2026 Serving with Amirudin Shari, Aminuddin Harun, Chang Lih Kang, Ramanan Ramakrishnan & Saifuddin Nasution Ismail
- President: Anwar Ibrahim

State Chairperson of the People's Justice Party of Johor
- Incumbent
- Assumed office 31 July 2025
- President: Anwar Ibrahim
- Deputy: Md Ysahrudin Kusni
- Preceded by: Syed Ibrahim Syed Noh

Chairperson of the Party Election Committee of the People's Justice Party
- Incumbent
- Assumed office 20 January 2022
- President: Anwar Ibrahim

Member of the Malaysian Parliament for Sekijang
- Incumbent
- Assumed office 19 November 2022
- Preceded by: Natrah Ismail (PH–PKR)
- Majority: 1,734 (2022)

Personal details
- Born: Zaliha binti Mustafa; 28 June 1964 (age 62) Johor Bahru, Johor, Malaysia
- Citizenship: Malaysia
- Party: National Justice Party (keADILan) (1999–2003); People's Justice Party (PKR) (2003–present)
- Other political affiliations: Pakatan Rakyat (PR) (2008–2015); Pakatan Harapan (PH) (since 2015)
- Spouse: Ahmad Azlan
- Children: 4
- Education: National University of Malaysia (MD)
- Occupation: Politician
- Profession: Physician

Zaliha binti Mustafa (Jawi: زاليحا بنت مصطفى; born 28 June 1964) is a Malaysian politician and physician who has served as the Minister in the Prime Minister's Department in charge of Federal Territories since December 2023 in the Unity Government administration under Prime Minister Anwar Ibrahim. She is the first woman to hold this portfolio. She previously made history as Malaysia’s first female Minister of Health, serving from December 2022 to December 2023 before the cabinet reshuffle. She has been the Member of Parliament (MP) for Sekijang since November 2022. A member of the People’s Justice Party (PKR), a component of the Pakatan Harapan (PH) coalition, she has held various key positions within the party, including Chairperson of the PKR Election Committee (JPP), Member of the Central Leadership Council (MPP) (2018–2020), Principal of the Keadilan Academy (2009), Deputy Chief of PKR Women’s Wing (2007–2009), and PKR Johor State Chairperson (2005–2007).

Dr. Zaliha also previously served as Political Secretary to the Minister of Women, Family, and Community Development, Dato’ Seri Dr. Wan Azizah Wan Ismail, during the administration of the 7th Prime Minister, Tun Dr. Mahathir Mohamad. She is currently the only Cabinet Minister serving without a deputy.

== Political career ==
=== Minister of Health (2022–2023) ===
On 2 December 2022, Zaliha was announced as the new Minister of Health by Prime Minister Anwar to serve in his cabinet. She created history by being the first woman appointed as the Minister of Health. Her predecessor Khairy Jamaluddin openly congratulated her on her appointment to the position. The following day on 3 December 2022, she officially took office after being sworn in.

=== Minister in the Prime Minister's Department (Federal Territories) (since 2023) ===
In a cabinet reshuffle on 12 December 2023, Zaliha was retained as a cabinet minister but was moved from the Ministry of Health to the Prime Minister's Department. The Ministry of Federal Territories was initially converted into the Department of Federal Territories when Anwar Ibrahim became the Prime Minister and is placed under the Prime Minister's Department. The cabinet reshuffle saw the Minister in the Prime Minister's Department (Sabah, Sarawak Affairs and Special Functions) post abolished with the portfolios distributed among the Deputy Prime Ministers; the National Disaster Management Agency (NADMA) was placed under Ahmad Zahid Hamidi while the Sabah and Sarawak Affairs was placed under Fadillah Yusof. Thus, a vacant Minister in the Prime Minister's Department post was assigned the Federal Territories portfolio that was returned to the Cabinet.

== Election results ==
Johor State Legislative Assembly
Year	Constituency	Candidate	Votes	Pct	Opponent(s)	Votes	Pct	Ballots cast	Majority	Turnout
2004	N44 Tanjong Puteri	Zaliha Mustafa (PKR)	6,515	19.92%	Ali Mohamed (UMNO)	26,191	80.08%	33,127	19,676	69.60%

Parliament of Malaysia
Year	Constituency	Candidate	Votes	Pct	Opponent(s)	Votes	Pct	Ballots cast	Majority	Turnout
2008	P162 Gelang Patah	Zaliha Mustafa (PKR)	24,779	42.42%	Tan Ah Eng (MCA)	33,630	57.58%	58,407	8,851	77.19%
2022	P141 Sekijang	Zaliha Mustafa (PKR)	18,941	39.27%	Md Salleheen Mohamad (UMNO)	17,207	35.67%	48,237	1,734	75.39%
2022	P141 Sekijang	Zaliha Mustafa (PKR)	18,941	39.27%	Uzzair Ismail (BERSATU)	11,612	24.07%	48,237	1,734	75.39%
2022	P141 Sekijang	Zaliha Mustafa (PKR)	18,941	39.27%	Mohd Zohar Ahmad (WARISAN)	339	0.70%	48,237	1,734	75.39%
2022	P141 Sekijang	Zaliha Mustafa (PKR)	18,941	39.27%	Mohd Saiful Faizal Abdul Halim (PEJUANG)	138	0.29%	48,237	1,734	75.39%

== Honours ==
=== Honours of Malaysia ===
- Malaysia
  - Recipient of the 17th Yang di-Pertuan Agong Installation Medal (2024)
- Federal Territory (Malaysia)
  - Grand Commander of the Order of the Territorial Crown (SMW) – Datuk Seri (2025)
