= Hasni Mohammad =

Malaysian politician and engineer

Yang Berhormat Dato' Hasni Mohammad SPMJ SUMW PGDK KMN AMN PIS MP
- حسني محمد

18th Menteri Besar of Johor
- In office 28 February 2020 – 15 March 2022
- Monarch: Ibrahim
- Preceded by: Sahruddin Jamal
- Succeeded by: Onn Hafiz Ghazi
- Constituency: Benut

Member of the Johor State Executive Council (Public Works, Rural and Regional Development)
- In office 14 May 2013 – 12 May 2018
- Monarch: Ibrahim Ismail
- Menteri Besar: Mohamed Khaled Nordin
- Preceded by: Ahmad Zahri Jamil (Public Works); Asiah Md Ariff (Rural and Regional Development)
- Succeeded by: Mazlan Bujang (Public Works); Dzulkefly Ahmad (Rural and Regional Development)
- Constituency: Benut

State Leader of the Opposition of Johor
- In office 28 June 2018 – 28 February 2020
- Monarch: Ibrahim
- Menteri Besar: Osman Sapian (2018–2019); Sahruddin Jamal (2019–2020)
- Preceded by: Gan Peck Cheng
- Succeeded by: Aminolhuda Hassan
- Constituency: Benut

Member of the Malaysian Parliament for Simpang Renggam
- Incumbent
- Assumed office 19 November 2022
- Preceded by: Maszlee Malik (PH–BERSATU)
- Majority: 1,821 (2022)

Member of the Johor State Legislative Assembly for Benut
- In office 8 March 2008 – 11 July 2026
- Preceded by: Salehan Sungot (BN–UMNO)
- Succeeded by: Mohd Somali Reduan (BN–UMNO)
- Majority: 6,304 (2008); 6,572 (2013); 4,447 (2018); 5,859 (2022)

Member of the Malaysian Parliament for Pontian
- In office 21 March 2004 – 8 March 2008
- Preceded by: Ong Ka Ting (BN–MCA)
- Succeeded by: Ahmad Maslan (BN–UMNO)
- Majority: 21,158 (2004)

State Chairman of the Barisan Nasional of Johor
- In office 2018–2023
- National Chairman: Ahmad Zahid Hamidi
- Preceded by: Mohamed Khaled Nordin
- Succeeded by: Mohamed Khaled Nordin

State Chairman of the United Malays National Organisation of Johor
- In office 14 July 2018 – 27 January 2023
- President: Ahmad Zahid Hamidi
- Deputy: Nur Jazlan Mohamed
- Preceded by: Mohamed Khaled Nordin
- Succeeded by: Mohamed Khaled Nordin

Division Chief of the United Malays National Organisation of Pontian
- In office 2001 – 18 March 2023
- President: Mahathir Mohamad (2001–2003); Abdullah Ahmad Badawi (2003–2009); Najib Razak (2009–2018); Ahmad Zahid Hamidi (2018–2023)
- Deputy: Ahmad Maslan
- Succeeded by: Ahmad Maslan

Chairman of the Malaysian Highway Authority
- In office 15 August 2022 – 15 December 2022
- Minister: Fadillah Yusof (2022); Alexander Nanta Linggi (2022)
- Preceded by: Abdul Rashid Asari
- Succeeded by: Jalaluddin Alias

Personal details
- Born: Hasni bin Mohammad; 27 March 1959 (age 67) Pontian, Johor, Malaya (now Malaysia)
- Citizenship: Malaysian
- Party: United Malays National Organisation (UMNO)
- Other political affiliations: Barisan Nasional (BN)
- Spouse: Fazlina Omar
- Education: University of Missouri–Rolla (BEng)
- Occupation: Politician
- Profession: Engineer
- Website: Hasni Mohammad on Facebook

Hasni bin Mohammad (Jawi: حسني بن محمد; born 27 March 1959) is a Malaysian politician and engineer who has served as the Member of Parliament (MP) for Simpang Renggam since November 2022 and Member of the Johor State Legislative Assembly (MLA) for Benut since March 2008. He served as the 18th Menteri Besar of Johor from February 2020 to March 2022, Leader of the Opposition of Johor from June 2018 to February 2020, Member of the Johor State Executive Council (EXCO) from May 2013 to May 2018 and MP for Pontian from March 2004 to March 2008 and Chairman of the Malaysian Highway Authority (LLM) from August 2022 to December 2022. He is a member of the United Malays National Organisation (UMNO), a component party of the Barisan Nasional (BN) coalition. He served as the State Chairman of BN of Johor from 2018 to 2023. He also served as the State Chairman of UMNO of Johor from July 2018 until his removal from the position in January 2023 and Division Chief of UMNO of Pontian from 2001 until his defeat in the party elections in March 2023.

== Political career ==
=== Member of Parliament for Pontian (2004–2008) ===
Hasni was first elected to Malaysian Parliament as the MP of Pontian in the 2004 general election (GE11).

=== Member of the Johor State Legislative Assembly for Benut (since 2008) ===
In the 2008 general election (GE12), he was elected as the Member of the Johor State Legislative Assembly for Benut. He managed to retain the seat in the 2013 (GE13) and 2018 (GE14) general elections. In the 2022 Johor state election, he was reelected as the Benut assemblyman for his 4th consecutive term by defeating all of his 3 opponents, Isa Abdul Hamid from Perikatan Nasional (PN), Haniff Ghazali Hosman from Pakatan Harapan (PH) and Iskandar Noor Ibrahim from Homeland Fighters Party (PEJUANG) with a majority of 5,859 votes.

=== Member of the Johor State Executive Council (2013–2018) ===
He was appointed an EXCO member by former Menteri Besar Mohamed Khaled Nordin.

=== Leader of the Opposition of Johor (2018–2020) ===
But in the aftermath GE14 which saw the fall of BN coalition government, he was elected the Opposition Leader of Johor from 2018 to 2020.

=== Menteri Besar of Johor (2020–2022) ===
On 28 February 2020, he was sworn in as the new Menteri Besar by the Sultan Ibrahim Ismail, replacing the incumbent Dato' Dr. Sahruddin Jamal after the collapse of Pakatan Harapan (PH) state government during the 2020 Malaysian political crisis.

In the Johor state election on 12 March 2022, he led his coalition to a huge and landslide victory in the 2022 Johor state election, winning 40 out of 56 state seats, giving him a two-thirds majority to form the next state government with a much stronger mandate after he lost the majority with only 28 seats in the assembly following the death of Kempas assemblyman Osman Sapian and strengthening his grip on power and position as Menteri Besar of Johor. BN Chairman and UMNO President Ahmad Zahid Hamidi also added that he would submit the name of Hasni to the Sultan of Johor for his reappointment to the position. However, on 14 March 2022, Hasni suddenly announced his withdrawal from the running for the position by stating that he would pave way and endorse a younger candidate to lead the state government citing long term development for Johor and the next day on 15 March 2022, caretaker EXCO member and new Machap MLA Onn Hafiz Ghazi was sworn in as the new and 19th Menteri Besar to take over him after his 2 years in office.

=== Member of Parliament for Simpang Renggam (since 2022) ===
In the 2022 general election, Hasni wrested the Simpang Renggam seat in Johor from Maszlee Malik of PH with a majority of 1,821 votes.

== Election results ==
Parliament of Malaysia
Year	Constituency	Candidate	Votes	Pct	Opponent(s)	Votes	Pct	Ballots cast	Majority	Turnout
2004	P164 Pontian	Hasni Mohammad (UMNO)	26,667	82.88%	Hassan Abdul Karim (PKR)	5,509	17.12%	33,460	21,158	75.40%
2022	P151 Simpang Renggam	Hasni Mohammad (UMNO)	18,312	41.19%	Maszlee Malik (PKR)	16,491	37.37%	44,131	1,821	74.76%
2022	P151 Simpang Renggam	Hasni Mohammad (UMNO)	18,312	41.19%	Mohd Fazrul Kamat (BERSATU)	9,077	20.57%	44,131	1,821	74.76%
2022	P151 Simpang Renggam	Hasni Mohammad (UMNO)	18,312	41.19%	Kamal Kusmin (PEJUANG)	251	0.57%	44,131	1,821	74.76%

Johor State Legislative Assembly
Year	Constituency	Candidate	Votes	Pct	Opponent(s)	Votes	Pct	Ballots cast	Majority	Turnout
2008	N53 Benut	Hasni Mohammad (UMNO)	10,098	72.69%	Sarobo Ponoh (PAS)	3,794	26.39%	14,376	6,304	77.10%
2013	N53 Benut	Hasni Mohammad (UMNO)	12,358	68.11%	Sarobo Ponoh (PAS)	5,786	31.89%	18,590	6,572	87.00%
2018	N53 Benut	Hasni Mohammad (UMNO)	9,480	55.43%	Zulkifly Tasrep (BERSATU)	5,033	29.43%	17,103	4,447	85.00%
2018	N53 Benut	Hasni Mohammad (UMNO)	9,480	55.43%	Mohd Firdaus Jaffar (PAS)	2,590	15.14%	17,103	4,447	85.00%
2022	N53 Benut	Hasni Mohammad (UMNO)	10,896	63.08%	Isa Abd. Hamid (BERSATU)	5,037	29.16%	17,272	5,859	63.58%
2022	N53 Benut	Hasni Mohammad (UMNO)	10,896	63.08%	Haniff Hosman (PKR)	1,200	6.95%	17,272	5,859	63.58%
2022	N53 Benut	Hasni Mohammad (UMNO)	10,896	63.08%	Iskandar Noor Ibrahim (PEJUANG)	139	0.80%	17,272	5,859	63.58%

== Honours ==
=== Honours of Malaysia ===
- Malaysia
  - Member of the Order of the Defender of the Realm (AMN) (2003)
  - Officer of the Order of the Defender of the Realm (KMN) (2006)
  - Recipient of the 17th Yang di-Pertuan Agong Installation Medal (2024)
- Federal Territory (Malaysia)
  - Grand Knight of the Order of the Territorial Crown (SUMW) – Datuk Seri Utama (2022)
- Johor
  - Second Class of the Sultan Ibrahim Medal (PIS II) (1999)
  - Second Class of the Sultan Ibrahim of Johor Medal (PSI II) (2015)
  - Knight Grand Commander of the Order of the Crown of Johor (SPMJ) – Dato' (2021)
- Sabah
  - Commander of the Order of Kinabalu (PGDK) – Datuk (2006)

Political offices
Preceded by Sahruddin Jamal	18th Menteri Besar of Johor; 2020 – 2022	Succeeded by Onn Hafiz Ghazi
