= Pemanis =

Political subdivision in Malaysia

Pemanis (N03)
Johor constituency

State constituency
- Legislature: Johor State Legislative Assembly
MLA
Anuar Abdul Manap
BN
- Constituency created: 2003
- First contested: 2004
- Last contested: 2026

Demographics
- Population (2020): 32,708
- Electors (2026): 30,458
- Area (km²): 230

Pemanis is a state constituency in Johor, Malaysia, that is represented in the Johor State Legislative Assembly.

The state constituency was first contested in 2004 and is mandated to return a single Assemblyman to the Johor State Legislative Assembly under the first-past-the-post voting system.

== Demographics ==
As of 2020, Pemanis has a population of 32,708 people.

Ethnic breakdown of Pemanis's electorate as of 2026
1. Malay (63.5%)
2. Chinese (32.6%)
3. Indian (2.20%)
4. Other ethnicities (1.70%)

== History ==
=== Polling districts ===
According to the gazette issued on 2 July 2026, the Pemanis constituency has a total of 13 polling districts.

State constituency	Polling districts	Code	Location
Pemanis（N03）	Pemanis 1	141/03/01	SK LKTP Pemanis 1
Pemanis（N03）	Pemanis 2	141/03/02	SK (FELDA) Pemanis 2
Pemanis（N03）	Bumbun	141/03/03	SA Mukim Jabi Kampung Bumbun
Pemanis（N03）	Sulir	141/03/04	SK Dato Seri Maharaja Lela
Pemanis（N03）	Pekan Jabi	141/03/05	SJK (C) Jabi
Pemanis（N03）	Tahang Rimau	141/03/06	SK Datuk Wan Idris
Pemanis（N03）	Jalan Buloh Kasap	141/03/07	SMJK Seg Hwa
Pemanis（N03）	Kampong Mengkudu	141/03/08	Balai Raya dan Tabika KEMAS Jalan Pemuda
Pemanis（N03）	Kampong Tengah	141/03/09	SJK (C) Kampung Tengah
Pemanis（N03）	FELDA Medoi	141/03/10	SK LKTP Medoi
Pemanis（N03）	Kampong Jawa	141/03/11	SK Kampong Jawa; SA Kampong Jawa
Pemanis（N03）	Gubah	141/03/12	SK Kampong Tengah
Pemanis（N03）	Kampong Abdullah Selatan	141/03/13	SK Canossian Convent

=== Representation history ===
Members of the Legislative Assembly for Pemanis
Assembly	No	Years	Member	Party
Constituency created from Sepinang
11th	N03	2004–2008	Lau Chin Hoon (刘清分)	BN (GERAKAN)
12th	N03	2008–2013	Lau Chin Hoon (刘清分)	BN (GERAKAN)
13th	N03	2013–2018	Lau Chin Hoon (刘清分)	BN (GERAKAN)
14th	N03	2018–2020	Chong Fat Full (张发虎)	PH (PKR)
14th	N03	2020	Chong Fat Full (张发虎)	Independent
14th	N03	2020–2022	Chong Fat Full (张发虎)	PN (BERSATU)
15th	N03	2022–2026	Anuar Abdul Manap	BN (UMNO)
16th	N03	2026–present	Anuar Abdul Manap	BN (UMNO)

== Election results ==
Johor state election, 2026: Pemanis
Party	Candidate	Votes	%	∆%
BN	Anuar Abdul Manap	14,506	68.12	▲18.31
PH	Jalex Lee En Xiang	6,126	28.77	▲28.77
PN	Arvientharan Anandan	663	3.11	▼18.85
Total valid votes		21,295	100.00	
Total rejected ballots		279		
Unreturned ballots		38		
Turnout		21,612	70.96	▲12.01
Registered electors		30,458		
Majority		8,380	39.35	▲15.32
BN hold		Swing		?

Johor state election, 2022: Pemanis
Party	Candidate	Votes	%	∆%
BN	Anuar Abdul Manap	8,678	49.81	▲6.64
PKR	Yoong Thau	4,491	25.78	▼19.36
PN	Uzzair Ismail	3,825	21.96	▲21.96
PEJUANG	Azita Amrin	247	1.42	▲1.42
Total valid votes		17,241	100.00	
Total rejected ballots		301		
Unreturned ballots		98		
Turnout		17,640	58.95	▼25.49
Registered electors		29,923		
Majority		4,187	24.03	▲22.06
BN gain from PKR		Swing		?

Johor state election, 2018: Pemanis
Party	Candidate	Votes	%	∆%
PKR	Chong Fat Full	8,304	45.14	▲45.14
BN	Koo Shiaw Lee	7,941	43.17	▼10.28
PAS	Normala Sudirman	2,151	11.69	▼34.86
Total valid votes		18,396	100.00	
Total rejected ballots		393		
Unreturned ballots		54		
Turnout		18,843	84.44	▼2.42
Registered electors		22,314		
Majority		363	1.97	▼4.93
PKR gain from BN		Swing		?

Johor state election, 2013: Pemanis
Party	Candidate	Votes	%	∆%
BN	Lau Chin Hoon	10,305	53.45	▼14.53
PAS	Firdaus Masod	8,976	46.55	▲14.53
Total valid votes		19,281	100.00	
Total rejected ballots		365		
Unreturned ballots		0		
Turnout		19,646	86.86	▲11.25
Registered electors		22,617		
Majority		1,329	6.90	▼29.06
BN hold		Swing		
Source(s) "Federal Government Gazette – Notice of Contested Election, State Legislative Assembly for the State of Selangor [P.U. (B) 192/2013]" (PDF). Attorney General's Chambers of Malaysia. 26 April 2013. Archived from the original (PDF) on 29 December 2019. "Federal Government Gazette – Results of Contested Election and Statements of the Poll after the Official Addition of Votes, State Constituencies for the State of Selangor [P.U. (B) 233/2013]" (PDF). Attorney General's Chambers of Malaysia. 22 May 2013. Archived from the original (PDF) on 2 October 2018.

Johor state election, 2008: Pemanis
Party	Candidate	Votes	%	∆%
BN	Lau Chin Hoon	9,708	67.98	▼12.46
PAS	Othman Selamat	4,573	32.02	▲12.46
Total valid votes		14,281	100.00	
Total rejected ballots		353		
Unreturned ballots		0		
Turnout		14,634	75.61	▲1.74
Registered electors		19,355		
Majority		5,135	35.96	▼24.92
BN hold		Swing		

Johor state election, 2004: Pemanis
Party	Candidate	Votes	%
BN	Lau Chin Hoon	11,039	80.44
PAS	Othman Selamat	2,685	19.56
Total valid votes		13,724	100.00
Total rejected ballots		322	
Unreturned ballots		0	
Turnout		14,046	73.87
Registered electors		19,015	
Majority		8,354	60.88
This was a new constituency created.
