= Kemelah =

Political subdivision in Malaysia

Kemelah (N04)
Johor constituency

State constituency
- Legislature: Johor State Legislative Assembly
MLA
Raven Kumar Krishnasamy
BN
- Constituency created: 2003
- First contested: 2004
- Last contested: 2026

Demographics
- Population (2020): 46,639
- Electors (2026): 35,365
- Area (km²): 320

Kemelah is a state constituency in Johor, Malaysia, that is represented in the Johor State Legislative Assembly.

The state constituency was first contested in 2004 and is mandated to return a single Assemblyman to the Johor State Legislative Assembly under the first-past-the-post voting system.

== Demographics ==
As of 2020, Kemelah has a population of 46,639 people.

Ethnic breakdown of Kemelah's electorate as of 2026
1. Malay (54.9%)
2. Chinese (38.2%)
3. Indian (5.60%)
4. Other ethnicities (1.40%)

== History ==
=== Polling districts ===
According to the gazette issued on 2 July 2026, the Kemelah constituency has a total of 13 polling districts.

State constituency	Polling districts	Code	Location
Kemelah（N04）	Segamat Baru	141/04/01	SK Segamat Baru; SK Bandar Putra; SJK (T) Bandar Segamat
Kemelah（N04）	Ladang Segamat	141/04/02	SJK (T) Ladang Segamat
Kemelah（N04）	FELDA Kemelah	141/04/03	SK (FELDA) Kemelah
Kemelah（N04）	Redong	141/04/04	SK (FELDA) Redong
Kemelah（N04）	Sekijang	141/04/05	Balai Raya FELCRA Berhad
Kemelah（N04）	Chuan Moh San	141/04/06	SJK (C) Tua Ooh
Kemelah（N04）	Kampong Melayu Raya	141/04/07	SK Melayu Raya
Kemelah（N04）	Bukit Siput	141/04/08	SK Kampung Paya Besar
Kemelah（N04）	Pekan Bukit Siput Utara	141/04/09	SJK (C) Bukit Siput
Kemelah（N04）	Paya Pulai	141/04/10	SA Taman Pelangi
Kemelah（N04）	Pogoh	141/04/11	SK Pagoh
Kemelah（N04）	Pekan Bukit Siput Selatan	141/04/12	SRA Bersepadu Segamat; SA Bukit Siput
Kemelah（N04）	Bandar Putra Segamat	141/04/13	SMK Bandar Putra

=== Representation history ===
Members of the Legislative Assembly for Kemelah
Assembly	No	Years	Member	Party
Constituency created from Tenang
11th	N04	2004–2008	Ayub Rahmat	BN (UMNO)
12th	N04	2008–2013	Ayub Rahmat	BN (UMNO)
13th	N04	2013–2018	Ayub Rahmat	BN (UMNO)
14th	N04	2018–2022	Sulaiman Mohd Nor	PH (AMANAH)
15th	N04	2022–2026	Saraswathy Nallathamby (சரஸ்வதி நல்லதம்பி)	BN (MIC)
15th	N04	2026–present	Raven Kumar Krishnasamy (ராவன் குமார் கிருஷ்ணாசம்)	BN (MIC)

== Election results ==
Johor state election, 2026: Kemelah
Party	Candidate	Votes	%	∆%
BN	Raven Kumar Krishnasamy	11,893	50.62	▲9.49
PH	Mohd Afif Abd Hamid	8,055	34.29	▲1.97
PN	Uzzair Ismail	3,545	15.09	▼10.29
Total valid votes		23,493		
Total rejected ballots		283		
Unreturned ballots		26		
Turnout		23,802	67.30	▲11.61
Registered electors		35,365		
Majority		3,838	16.33	▲7.52
BN hold		Swing		?

Johor state election, 2022: Kemelah
Party	Candidate	Votes	%	∆%
BN	Saraswathy Nallathamby	7,518	41.13	▼2.77
PH	Sulaiman Mohd Nor	5,907	32.32	▲32.32
PN	Normala Sudirman	4,639	25.38	▲25.38
PEJUANG	Norizan Sahardin	214	1.17	▲1.17
Total valid votes		18,278	100.00	
Total rejected ballots		412		
Unreturned ballots		80		
Turnout		18,770	55.69	▼28.87
Registered electors		33,702		
Majority		1,611	8.81	▼3.39
BN gain from PKR		Swing		?

Johor state election, 2018: Kemelah
Party	Candidate	Votes	%	∆%
PKR	Sulaiman Mohd Nor	10,836	56.10	▲12.53
BN	Anuar Abdul Manap	8,481	43.90	▼12.53
Total valid votes		19,317	100.00	
Total rejected ballots		296		
Unreturned ballots		74		
Turnout		19,687	84.56	▼2.50
Registered electors		23,282		
Majority		2,355	12.20	▼0.66
PKR gain from BN		Swing		?

Johor state election, 2013: Kemelah
Party	Candidate	Votes	%	∆%
BN	Ayub Rahmat	9,917	56.43	▼16.52
PKR	Natrah Ismail	7,657	43.57	▲16.52
Total valid votes		17,574	100.00	
Total rejected ballots		229		
Unreturned ballots		0		
Turnout		17,803	87.06	▲10.51
Registered electors		20,449		
Majority		2,260	12.86	▼33.04
BN hold		Swing		
Source(s) "Federal Government Gazette – Notice of Contested Election, State Legislative Assembly for the State of Selangor [P.U. (B) 192/2013]" (PDF). Attorney General's Chambers of Malaysia. 26 April 2013. Archived from the original (PDF) on 29 December 2019. "Federal Government Gazette – Results of Contested Election and Statements of the Poll after the Official Addition of Votes, State Constituencies for the State of Selangor [P.U. (B) 233/2013]" (PDF). Attorney General's Chambers of Malaysia. 22 May 2013. Archived from the original (PDF) on 2 October 2018.

Johor state election, 2008: Kemelah
Party	Candidate	Votes	%	∆%
BN	Ayub Rahmat	8,639	72.95	▼9.76
PKR	Bahruddin Nor	3,204	27.05	▲27.05
Total valid votes		11,843	100.00	
Total rejected ballots		239		
Unreturned ballots		0		
Turnout		12,082	76.55	▲0.89
Registered electors		15,783		
Majority		5,435	45.90	▼19.52
BN hold		Swing		

Johor state election, 2004: Kemelah
Party	Candidate	Votes	%
BN	Ayub Rahmat	8,909	82.71
PAS	Suleiman Shuib	1,862	17.29
Total valid votes		10,771	100.00
Total rejected ballots		260	
Unreturned ballots		0	
Turnout		11,031	75.66
Registered electors		14,579	
Majority		7,047	65.42
This was a new constituency created.
