= Bukit Serampang (state constituency) =

Malaysian defunct state constituency

Johor constituency

Defunct state constituency
- Legislature: Johor State Legislative Assembly
- Constituency created: 1958
- Constituency abolished: 2018
- First contested: 1959
- Last contested: 2013

Bukit Serampang is a state constituency in Johor, Malaysia that has been represented in the Johor State Legislative Assembly since 1959 until 2018.

The state constituency was created in the 1958 and is mandated to return a single member to the Johor State Legislative Assembly under the first past the post voting system.

== History ==
It was abolished in 2018 when it was redistributed.

=== Representation history ===
Members of the Legislative Assembly for Bukit Serampang
| Assembly | No | Years | Member | Party |
Constituency created from Muar Inland
| 1st | N01 | 1959–1964 | Hassan Yunus | Alliance (UMNO) |
| 2nd | N01 | 1964–1968 | Hassan Yunus | Alliance (UMNO) |
| 2nd | N01 | 1968–1969 | Abdul Rahman Mahmud | Alliance (UMNO) |
| | | 1969–1971 | Assembly was suspended | |
| 3rd | N01 | 1971–1973 | Abdul Rahman Mahmud | Alliance (UMNO) |
| 3rd | N01 | 1973–1974 | Abdul Rahman Mahmud | BN (UMNO) |
| 4th | N04 | 1974–1978 | Talib Ali | BN (UMNO) |
| 5th | N04 | 1978–1982 | Talib Ali | BN (UMNO) |
| 6th | N04 | 1982–1986 | Zakaria Salleh | BN (UMNO) |
| 7th | N05 | 1986–1990 | Muhyiddin Yassin | BN (UMNO) |
| 8th | N05 | 1990–1995 | Muhyiddin Yassin | BN (UMNO) |
| 9th | N05 | 1995–1999 | Ahmad Omar | BN (UMNO) |
| 10th | N05 | 1999–2004 | Tahir Mohd Taat | BN (UMNO) |
| 11th | N07 | 2004–2008 | Tahir Mohd Taat | BN (UMNO) |
| 12th | N07 | 2008–2013 | Tahir Mohd Taat | BN (UMNO) |
| 13th | N07 | 2013–2018 | Ismail Mohamed | BN (UMNO) |
Constituency renamed to Bukit Kepong

== Election results ==
Johor state election, 2013
| Party | Candidate | Votes | % | ∆% |
|---|---|---|---|---|
| BN | Ismail Mohamed | 12,977 | 71.66 | ▼4.31 |
| PKR | Saadon Abdullah | 5,132 | 28.34 | ▲28.34 |
| Total valid votes | | 18,109 | 100.00 | |
| Total rejected ballots | | 382 | | |
| Unreturned ballots | | 36 | | |
| Turnout | | 18,527 | 86.46 | ▲10.51 |
| Registered electors | | 21,429 | | |
| Majority | | 7,845 | 43.32 | ▼8.61 |
| BN hold | | Swing | | |

Johor state election, 2008
| Party | Candidate | Votes | % | ∆% |
|---|---|---|---|---|
| BN | Tahir Mohd Taat | 10,605 | 75.97 | ▼6.64 |
| PAS | Mahfodz Mohamed | 3,355 | 24.03 | ▲6.64 |
| Total valid votes | | 13,960 | 100.00 | |
| Total rejected ballots | | 356 | | |
| Unreturned ballots | | 22 | | |
| Turnout | | 14,338 | 75.94 | ▲1.77 |
| Registered electors | | 18,880 | | |
| Majority | | 7,250 | 51.93 | ▼13.27 |
| BN hold | | Swing | | |

Johor state election, 2004
| Party | Candidate | Votes | % | ∆% |
|---|---|---|---|---|
| BN | Tahir Mohd Taat | 11,482 | 82.60 | ▲7.76 |
| PAS | Mahfodz Mohamed | 2,418 | 17.40 | ▲17.40 |
| Total valid votes | | 13,900 | 100.00 | |
| Total rejected ballots | | 340 | | |
| Unreturned ballots | | 13 | | |
| Turnout | | 14,253 | 74.17 | ▲2.86 |
| Registered electors | | 19,216 | | |
| Majority | | 9,064 | 65.21 | ▲15.53 |
| BN hold | | Swing | | |

Johor state election, 1999
| Party | Candidate | Votes | % | ∆% |
|---|---|---|---|---|
| BN | Tahir Mohd Taat | 9,317 | 74.84 | ▼13.39 |
| PKR | Mohamad Yussof Abd Ghani | 3,132 | 25.16 | ▲25.16 |
| Total valid votes | | 12,449 | 100.00 | |
| Total rejected ballots | | 441 | | |
| Unreturned ballots | | 13 | | |
| Turnout | | 12,903 | 71.31 | ▼0.16 |
| Registered electors | | 18,094 | | |
| Majority | | 6,185 | 49.68 | ▼26.78 |

Johor state election, 1995
| Party | Candidate | Votes | % | ∆% |
|---|---|---|---|---|
| BN | Ahmad Omar | 10,939 | 88.23 | ▲7.71 |
| S46 | A. Aziz Hashim | 1,459 | 11.77 | ▼7.71 |
| Total valid votes | | 12,398 | 100.00 | |
| Total rejected ballots | | 394 | | |
| Unreturned ballots | | 20 | | |
| Turnout | | 12,812 | 71.47 | ▼4.88 |
| Registered electors | | 17,927 | | |
| Majority | | 9,480 | 76.46 | ▲15.42 |
| BN hold | | Swing | | |

Johor state election, 1990
| Party | Candidate | Votes | % | ∆% |
|---|---|---|---|---|
| BN | Muhyiddin Yassin | 9,260 | 80.52 | |
| S46 | Omar Lambak | 2,240 | 19.48 | |
| Total valid votes | | 11,500 | 100.00 | |
| Total rejected ballots | | 411 | | |
| Unreturned ballots | | 0 | | |
| Turnout | | 11,917 | 76.35 | ▲76.35 |
| Registered electors | | 15,609 | | |
| Majority | | 7,020 | 61.04 | ▲61.04 |
| BN hold | | Swing | | |

Johor state election, 1986
| Party | Candidate | Votes | % | ∆% |
|---|---|---|---|---|
On the nomination day, Muhyiddin Yassin won uncontested.
| BN | Muhyiddin Yassin | | | |
| Total valid votes | | | 100.00 | |
| Total rejected ballots | | | | |
| Unreturned ballots | | | | |
| Turnout | | | | |
| Registered electors | | 14,118 | | |
| Majority | | | | |
| BN hold | | Swing | | |

Johor state election, 1982
| Party | Candidate | Votes | % | ∆% |
|---|---|---|---|---|
| BN | Zakaria Salleh | 10,442 | 84.45 | ▼2.68 |
| DAP | Daud Jabah | 1,923 | 15.55 | ▲15.55 |
| Total valid votes | | 12,365 | 100.00 | |
| Total rejected ballots | | 393 | | |
| Unreturned ballots | | 0 | | |
| Turnout | | 12,758 | 79.16 | ▼1.71 |
| Registered electors | | 16,117 | | |
| Majority | | 8,519 | 68.90 | ▼5.37 |
| BN hold | | Swing | | |

Johor state election, 1978
| Party | Candidate | Votes | % | ∆% |
|---|---|---|---|---|
| BN | Talib Ali | 9,290 | 87.13 | |
| PAS | Daud Jabah | 1,372 | 12.87 | |
| Total valid votes | | 10,662 | 100.00 | |
| Total rejected ballots | | 816 | | |
| Unreturned ballots | | 0 | | |
| Turnout | | 11,478 | 80.87 | ▲80.87 |
| Registered electors | | 14,194 | | |
| Majority | | 7,918 | 74.26 | ▲74.26 |
| BN hold | | Swing | | |

Johor state election, 1974
| Party | Candidate | Votes | % | ∆% |
|---|---|---|---|---|
On the nomination day, Talib Ali won uncontested.
| BN | Talib Ali | | | |
| Total valid votes | | | 100.00 | |
| Total rejected ballots | | | | |
| Unreturned ballots | | | | |
| Turnout | | | | |
| Registered electors | | 12,645 | | |
| Majority | | | | |
| BN hold | | Swing | | |

Johor state election, 1969
| Party | Candidate | Votes | % | ∆% |
|---|---|---|---|---|
| Alliance | Abdul Rahman Mahmud | 9,108 | 88.13 | ▲5.03 |
| PMIP | Shamingan | 1,227 | 11.87 | ▼5.03 |
| Total valid votes | | 10,335 | 100.00 | |
| Total rejected ballots | | 385 | | |
| Unreturned ballots | | 0 | | |
| Turnout | | 10,720 | 73.24 | ▼0.17 |
| Registered electors | | 14,636 | | |
| Majority | | 7,881 | 76.26 | ▲10.07 |
| Alliance hold | | Swing | | |

Johor state by-election, 7 September 1968 Upon the death of incumbent, Hassan Yunus
| Party | Candidate | Votes | % | ∆% |
|---|---|---|---|---|
| Alliance | Abdul Rahman Mahmud | 7,918 | 83.09 | |
| PMIP | Abdul Rahman Ali | 1,611 | 16.91 | |
| Total valid votes | | 9,529 | 100.00 | |
| Total rejected ballots | | 127 | | |
| Unreturned ballots | | 0 | | |
| Turnout | | 9,656 | 73.41 | |
| Registered electors | | 13,153 | | |
| Majority | | 6,307 | | |
| Alliance hold | | Swing | | |

Johor state election, 1964
| Party | Candidate | Votes | % | ∆% |
|---|---|---|---|---|
On the nomination day, Hassan Yunus won uncontested.
| Alliance | Hassan Yunus | | | |
| Total valid votes | | | 100.00 | |
| Total rejected ballots | | | | |
| Unreturned ballots | | | | |
| Turnout | | | | |
| Registered electors | | 10,647 | | |
| Majority | | | | |
| Alliance hold | | Swing | | |

Johor state election, 1959
| Party | Candidate | Votes | % |
|---|---|---|---|
| Alliance | Hassan Yunus | 5,429 | 76.80 |
| National Party | Omar Ahmad | 897 | 12.69 |
| Independent | Abdul Rahman Mahmood | 743 | 10.51 |
| Total valid votes | | 7,069 | 100.00 |
| Total rejected ballots | | 200 | |
| Unreturned ballots | | 0 | |
| Turnout | | 7,269 | 82.11 |
| Registered electors | | 8,853 | |
| Majority | | 4,532 | 64.11 |
This is new created constituency
