= Benut =

Coordinates: 1°38′N 103°16′E

Benut بنوت
- Mukim
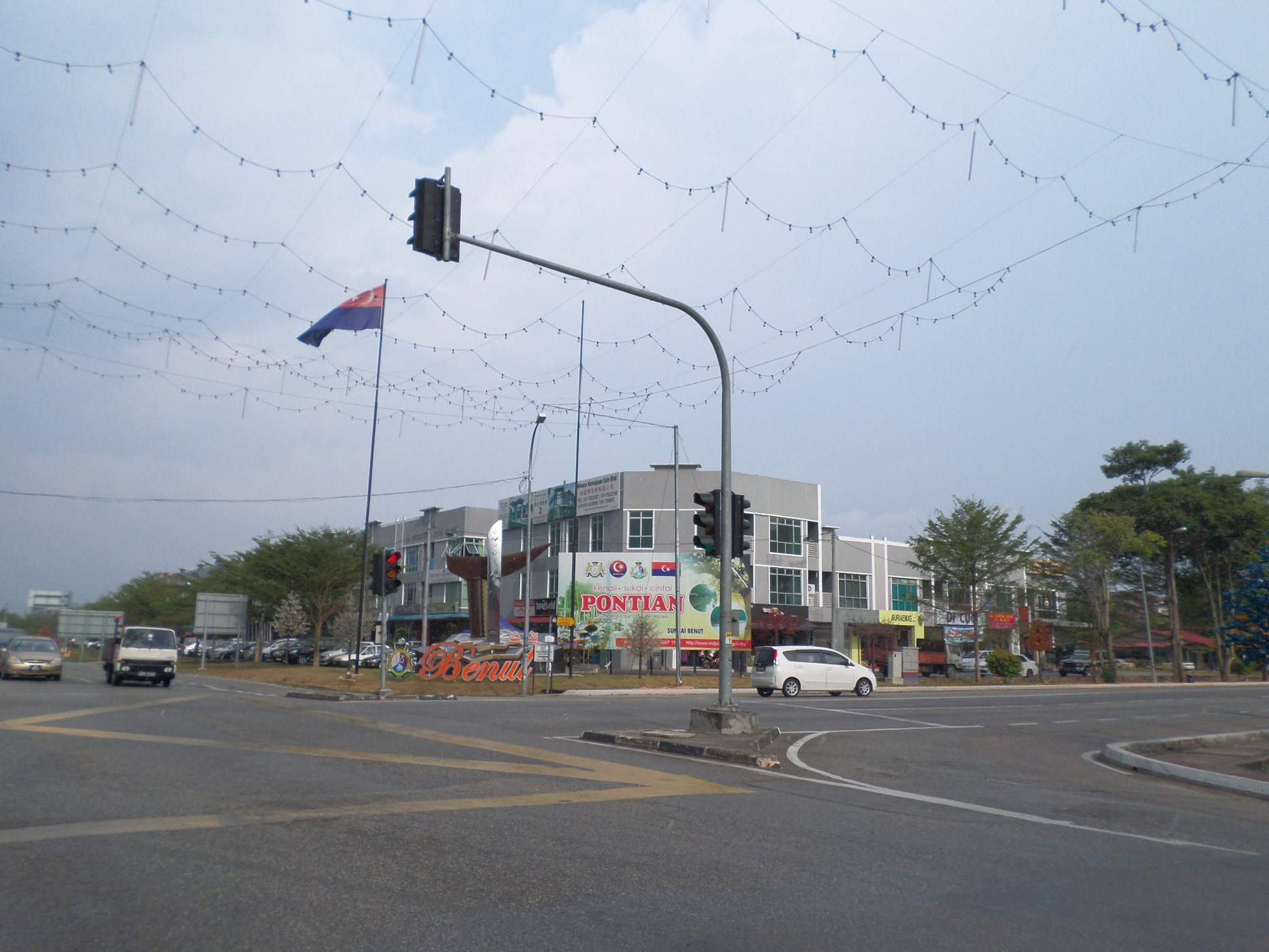
- Interactive map of Benut
- Country: Malaysia
- State: Johor
- District: Pontian

Area
  - Total: 140 km^{2} (54 sq mi)

Population
  - Total: 15,389
  - Density: 110/km^{2} (280/sq mi)

Benut is a mukim in Pontian District, Johor, Malaysia.

== Geography ==
Benut in Pontian District

The mukim spans over an area of 140 km^{2} (54 sq mi).

== Demographics ==
Benut has a population of 15,389 people. The Malays make up the majority in Benut, however there is a large percentage of Orang Kuala, Buginese, Javanese, Chinese, and Indian population as well.

== Education ==
=== Primary school ===
1. Sekolah Kebangsaan Sri Benut
2. Sekolah Kebangsaan Seri Sinaran
3. Sekolah Kebangsaan Seri Setia
4. Sekolah Kebangsaan Seri Senang Hati
5. Sekolah Kebangsaan Seri Semangat
6. Sekolah Kebangsaan Seri Kembar
7. Sekolah Kebangsaan Seri Jaya
8. Sekolah Kebangsaan Seri Bahagia
9. Sekolah Kebangsaan Seri Al Ulum
10. Sekolah Kebangsaan Parit Markom
11. Sekolah Kebangsaan seri Bugis Benut
12. Sekolah Kebangsaan Benut
13. Sekolah Jenis Kebangsaan (Cina) Lok Yu(2)
14. Sekolah Jenis Kebangsaan (Cina) Lok Yu 6
15. Sekolah Jenis Kebangsaan (Cina) Lok Yu 4
16. Sekolah Jenis Kebangsaan (Cina) Lok Yu 3
17. Sekolah Jenis Kebangsaan (Cina) Lok Yu 1
18. Sekolah Jenis Kebangsaan (Cina) Lok York

=== Secondary school ===
1. Sekolah Menengah Kebangsaan Sri Tanjung
2. Sekolah Menengah Kebangsaan Parit Betak
3. Sekolah Menengah Kebangsaan Benut
4. sekolah Menengah Agama Arab An-Nur

== Transportation ==
The mukim is served by TransJohor public buses linking to Pontian Kechil.
