= Othman Saat =

Malaysian politician (1927–2007)

Yang Berbahagia Tan Sri Dato' Othman Saat PMN SJMK
- عثمان محمد ساعة

11th Menteri Besar of Johor
- In office 4 February 1967 – 4 April 1982
- Monarchs: Ismail (1967–1981); Iskandar (1981–1982)
- Preceded by: Hassan Yunus
- Succeeded by: Abdul Ajib Ahmad
- Constituency: Jorak (1967–1974); Kesang (1974–1982)

Member of the Johor State Legislative Assembly for Kesang
- In office 1974–1982
- Preceded by: Constituency established
- Succeeded by: Sabariah Ahmad

Member of the Johor State Legislative Assembly for Jorak
- In office 1959–1974
- Preceded by: Constituency established
- Succeeded by: Abdul Rahman Mahmud

Personal details
- Born: Othman bin Mohamed Saat; 4 April 1927 Muar, Johor, Malaya
- Died: 27 October 2007 (aged 80) Johor Bahru, Johor, Malaysia
- Cause of death: Sepsis
- Resting place: Mahmoodiah Royal Mausoleum
- Citizenship: Malaysian
- Party: United Malays National Organization (UMNO) (1946–1985); Spirit of 46 Malay Party (S46) (1987–1996)
- Other political affiliations: Alliance (1957–1973); Barisan Nasional (BN) (1973–1985); Gagasan Rakyat (GR) (1990–1996); Angkatan Perpaduan Ummah (APU) (1990–1991)
- Spouses: Rokiah Alwee (died 1990); Kamariah Bujang; Hasmah Hussein (divorced)
- Occupation: Politician

Othman bin Mohamed Saat (4 April 1927 – 27 October 2007) was a Malaysian politician from the United Malays National Organization (UMNO), and later, Spirit of 46 Malay Party (S46), who served as the 11th Menteri Besar of Johor in Malaysia.

== Political career ==
Othman's political career began with the Malay nationalist movement in the 1940s. He joined the UMNO party after it was founded in Batu Pahat by Onn Jaafar in 1946. Othman became a committee member of UMNO in 1952. He enrolled on the day of UMNO's establishment - 11 May 1946.

In 1955, Othman contested in the 1955 Malayan general election, winning the Jorak state constituency uncontested. He became an executive council member (EXCO) of the Johor State Executive Council in 1958.

In 1964, Othman was appointed EXCO member in charge of the Local Government and Housing portfolio and initiated low-cost housing schemes for the poor and opened the Federal Land Development Authority (Felda) and FELCRA Berhad land schemes in Johor during the tenure of prime minister Abdul Razak Hussein in the 1970s.

=== Menteri Besar of Johor ===
On 4 April 1967, at the age of 43, Othman was appointed the 11th Chief Minister of Johor. He held this position for three terms until 1982. His fate changed when Dr. Mahathir Mohamad became prime minister with Musa Hitam as his deputy. Musa Hitam was said to have used all means from UMNO headquarters in Kuala Lumpur to weaken Othman's influence. This is the starting point of the fall of his political career.

Journalist Chamil Wariya, in his book 'Crisis of the Sultan - the Chief Minister, what really happened', describes the crisis between Othman and the Sultan of Johor. The then-Deputy Prime Minister of Malaysia, Musa Hitam, reprimanded Othman for allegedly giving timber and land areas based on political considerations. Othman was ordered to stop the practice. He is seen as the Chief Minister for a long time and should provide access to young people.

Tunku Mahmood Iskandar, who had just been re-appointed as the Crown Prince of Johor, urged Othman to immediately resign for questioning the legitimacy of the crown prince. Several demonstrations were reportedly planned to be held in several places including Kota Tinggi. The ailing Sultan Sir Ismail Al Khalidi fell into a coma on 8 May, three days before his death. The newly installed Sultan Mahmood Iskandar issued a decree for Othman to vacate his office within 24 hours, shortly after Sultan Ismail's death. But Othman ignored that directive but eventually resigned after the intervention of Dr. Mahathir Mohamad.

In 1982, Othman resigned as Chief Minister after 16 years of service.

In 1985, Othman was defeated by Muhyiddin Muhammad Yassin for the post of Pagoh division chief of UMNO. He had served in that position for 14 years.

A few years later, in 1987, he joined the newly formed Tengku Razaleigh Hamzah-helmed political party S46 to challenge UMNO in the 1990 Malaysian general election. However, the party did not succeed and was later dissolved.

== Personal life ==
Othman was born in Kampung Tengah (Tengah Village), Muar, Johor to a wealthy rice trader.

Othman has nine children from three marriages, seven children (first wife) one child (second wife) one child (third wife), 32 grandchildren and ten great-grandchildren. His first wife, Rokiah Alwi, died in 1990. His third marriage with Hasmah Hussein ended in divorce. Othman's second wife Kamariah Buyung and eldest son Zulkifli Othman and his other children were with him when he died.

A luxury car enthusiast, Othman's collection at one time included 50 different cars, with brands including Ferrari, Alfa Romeo and Jaguar. Later, he maintained he only has one Mercedes-Benz S400 with his favourite plate number, JDN 7.

== Honours ==
- Malaysia
  - Commander of the Order of the Defender of the Realm (PMN) – Tan Sri (1975)
- Johor
  - Sultan Ibrahim Medal (PIS) (revoked 1982)
  - Knight Grand Commander of the Order of the Crown of Johor (SPMJ) – Dato' (1968, revoked 1982)
  - Second Class of the Royal Family Order of Johor (DK II) (1969, revoked 1982)
  - First Class of the Royal Family Order of Johor (DK I) (1972, revoked 1982)
  - Knight Grand Companion of the Order of Loyalty of Sultan Ismail of Johor (SSIJ) – Dato' (1975, revoked 1982)
  - Star of Sultan Ismail (BSI) (revoked 1982)
- Kelantan
  - Knight Grand Commander of the Order of the Life of the Crown of Kelantan (SJMK) – Dato' (1989)

== Death ==
Othman experienced light strokes in 2001 and 2002. He had his right leg amputated from the knee downwards due to a gangrene on 2 October 2007, at Sultan Ismail Hospital and gradually recovered. Othman also experienced spinal pain after lying in bed for too long.

On 27 October 2007, Othman died at the age of 80 at the Sultan Ismail Hospital in Pandan-Tebrau, Johor Bahru due to sepsis at 7.00 am. Prayers were offered at the Sultan Abu Bakar State Mosque with the crown prince of Johor, Tunku Ibrahim Ismail ibni Sultan Iskandar Al-Haj, present. Othman was subsequently buried in Mahmoodiah Royal Mausoleum.

A village in Johor has been named 'Othman Saat Village' to commemorate his service.
