= Abdul Ajib Ahmad =

Malaysian politician

Yang Berhormat Dato' Abdul Ajib Ahmad DGSM DPMJ BSI

12th Menteri Besar of Johor
- In office 29 April 1982 – 12 August 1986
- Monarch: Iskandar
- Preceded by: Othman Saat
- Succeeded by: Muhyiddin Yassin
- Constituency: Endau

Personal details
- Born: 13 September 1947 Segamat, Johor, Malayan Union (now Malaysia)
- Died: 3 February 2011 (aged 63) Kuala Lumpur, Malaysia
- Resting place: Bukit Kiara Muslim Cemetery, Kuala Lumpur
- Party: United Malays National Organisation – Barisan Nasional
- Education: University of Malaya

Abdul Ajib bin Ahmad (13 September 1947 – 3 February 2011) was a Malaysian politician. He served as the Chief Minister of Johor from 1982 and 1986 and was later a minister in the federal government of Mahathir Mohamad. He was a member of the United Malays National Organisation (UMNO).

An economics graduate, Ajib worked as an adviser to Musa Hitam before becoming Chief Minister of Johor in 1982. He served as Chief Minister until 1986, when he moved to federal politics, winning the seat of Mersing. He became a minister in the government of Mahathir Mohamad, but was dismissed in 1987 when Mahathir promptly purged the government cabinet of those who opposed him when they supported, among others, the then Deputy Prime Minister Tun Musa Hitam and Razaleigh Hamzah in the UMNO party presidency election.

Ahmad died of a heart attack at the age of 63 on 3 February 2011, leaving his wife Datin Ropeah Hassan, three sons and a daughter.

== Election results ==
Johor State Legislative Assembly
Year	Constituency	Candidate	Votes	Pct	Opponent(s)	Votes	Pct	Ballots cast	Majority	Turnout
1982	N07 Endau	Abdul Ajib Ahmad (UMNO)	6,760	81.45%	Ibrahim Abdullah (PAS)	1,540	18.55%	8,709	5,220	72.85%

Parliament of Malaysia
Year	Constituency	Candidate	Votes	Pct	Opponent(s)	Votes	Pct	Ballots cast	Majority	Turnout
1986	P119 Mersing	Abdul Ajib Ahmad (UMNO)	14,419	80.29%	Mokhtar Yahaya (PAS)	3,540	19.71%	19,065	10,879	67.41%
1990	P119 Mersing	Abdul Ajib Ahmad (UMNO)	14,366	59.31%	Hassan Md. Ali (S46)	9,857	40.69%	25,081	4,509	72.66%

== Honours ==
- Johor
  - Star of Sultan Ismail (BSI)
  - Knight Commander of the Order of the Crown of Johor (DPMJ) – Dato'
- Malacca
  - Grand Commander of the Exalted Order of Malacca (DGSM) – Datuk Seri (1984)
