= Wan Idris Ibrahim =

Malaysian politician

Yang Berhormat Dato' Wan Idris Ibrahim DK II (Johor) SPMJ PLP PIS
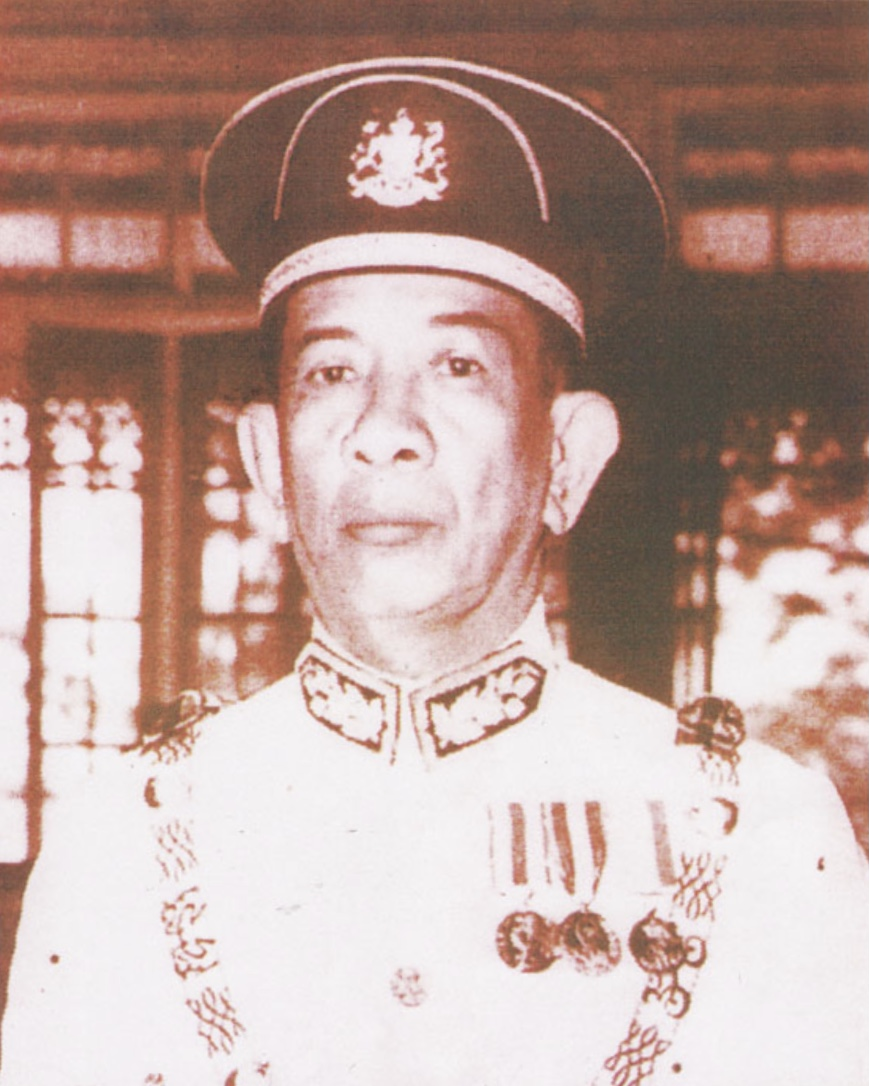
- Official portrait of Wan Idris as Menteri Besar of Johor from 1955 to 1959

9th Menteri Besar of Johor
- In office 1 October 1955 – 16 June 1959
- Monarchs: Ibrahim; Ismail
- Preceded by: Syed Abdul Kadir Mohamed
- Succeeded by: Hassan Yunus

Personal details
- Born: Wan Idris bin Wan Ibrahim; 3 October 1888 Segamat, Johor, British Malaya
- Died: 11 January 1973 (aged 84) Johor Bahru, Johor, Malaysia
- Resting place: Mahmoodiah Royal Mausoleum, Johor Bahru, Johor, Malaysia
- Citizenship: Malaysian
- Party: United Malays National Organisation (UMNO) part of Alliance Party
- Spouse: Rogayah Mohamed Ariff
- Children: 15
- Parent(s): Wan Ibrahim (father); Nor Khamis (mother)
- Occupation: Politician; magistrate; civil servant

Wan Idris bin Wan Ibrahim (3 October 1888 – 11 January 1973) or also referred to as Wan Idris Ibrahim, was a Malaysian politician and civil servant who served as the 9th Menteri Besar of Johor from 1955 to 1959.

== Biography ==
=== Early life and education ===
Wan Idris was born on 3 October 1888 in Segamat, Johor. He is Temenggong of Muar's ancestor. He was proficient in reading, math, and writing when he got to Johor Bahru. Even though he wasn't quite 10 years old, he was also able to write in Rumi and understand some English. He was the second generation to carry out the practice of training family members and Malay children chosen to serve as Johor magistrates in the future. This was so because Sultan Abu Bakar picked him to be schooled, educated, and sent to England, but he afterwards helped Sultan Ibrahim when Sultan Abu Bakar died in 1895. Along with the children of the nobility, Wan Idris attended the Johor Bahru Malay School before continuing his education in the Bukit Zaharah English School up until 1903. He was chosen to travel to England with Sultan Ibrahim's entourage in 1904. Dato Onn and he were two of the students that attended the Sulfork school.

=== Career ===
Wan Idris was seen as a symbol of both the Temenggong of Muar family's role as a middleman and contributed to Sultan Abu Bakar's overall achievement in maintaining control over the state of Johor. He served the Sultan and the Johor government in an official capacity from 1898 until 1955, when he was forced to retire. Then Sultan Ibrahim gave his approval, designating him as the 9th Menteri Besar, serving from 1 October 1955 to 16 June 1959. On 6 June 1959, he issued a proclamation stating that Tengku Ismail becoming the Crown prince of Johor. He achieved the pinnacle of his career when he was appointed as Menteri Besar and served as the sultan's personal advisor. He was the sultan's designated advisor and executor of his directives. He has become one of Sultan Ibrahim's most senior officials as a result of his achievement in increasing tax and revenue collection. Following the death of Sultan Ibrahim, Wan Idris relinquished his position as the Menteri Besar of Johor on 16 June 1959 to make way for a new incumbent in accordance with the Constitution of the Federation of Independent Malaya.

=== Death ===
Wan Idris died on 11 January 1973 at the age of 84 and was laid to rest at the Mahmoodiah Royal Mausoleum in Johor Bahru.

== Personal life ==
Wan Idris is married to Datin Rogayah binti Mohamed Ariff.

== Honours ==
During his period of service, he held the honorary title of Yang Berhormat (The Honourable) Dato'. He has earned the following honours;

- Second Class of the Royal Family Order of Johor (DK II) (1967)
- Knight Grand Commander of the Order of the Crown of Johor (SPMJ) – Dato' (1955)
- Medal for Long Service and Good Conduct (PLP)
- First Class of the Sultan Ibrahim Medal (PIS)
