= Hassan Yunus =

Malaysian politician (1907–1968)

Yang Berbahagia Tan Sri Dato' Haji Hassan Yunus PMN SPMJ PIS
- حسن يونس
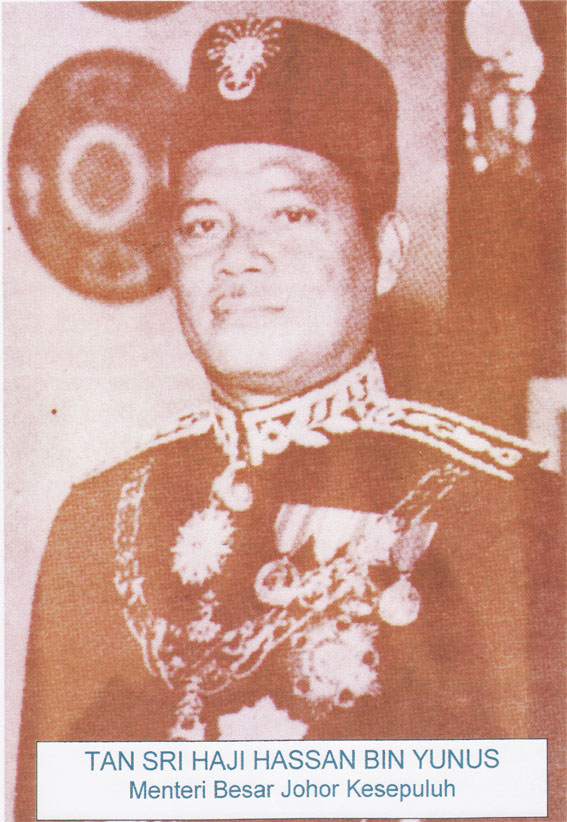

10th Menteri Besar of Johor
- In office 27 June 1959 – 31 January 1967
- Preceded by: Wan Idris Ibrahim
- Succeeded by: Othman Saat
- Constituency: Bukit Serampang

Member of the Johor State Legislative Assembly for Bukit Serampang
- In office 1959–1968
- Preceded by: Constituency established
- Succeeded by: Abdul Rahman Mahmud

Member of the Malayan Federal Legislative Council for Muar Utara
- In office 1955–1959
- Preceded by: Constituency established
- Succeeded by: Ahmad Arshad as Member of Parliament of the Federation of Malaya for Muar Utara

Member of the Malayan State and Settlement Council for Muar Inland
- In office 1954–1959
- Preceded by: Constituency established
- Succeeded by: Constituency abolished

Johor State Mufti
- In office 1941–1947
- Preceded by: Alwi bin Thahir al-Haddad (1934–1941)
- Succeeded by: Alwi bin Thahir al-Haddad (1947–1961)

Personal details
- Born: 1907 Muar, Johor, Malaya
- Died: 12 July 1968 (aged 60–61) Johor Bahru, Johor, Malaysia
- Resting place: Mahmoodiah Muslim Cemetery, Johor Bahru, Johor
- Citizenship: Malaysian
- Party: United Malays National Organisation (UMNO) part of Alliance Party
- Spouse: Rugayah Abdullah
- Children: 3
- Education: Al-Azhar University
- Occupation: Politician

Hassan bin Yunus (Jawi: حسن بن يونس; 1907 – 12 July 1968) was the State Mufti serving from 1941 to 1947 and Menteri Besar serving from 1959 to 1967 of Johor, Malaysia. He was a member of the United Malays National Organisation (UMNO), a component party of Barisan Nasional (formerly Alliance Party) coalition.

== Awards and recognitions ==
=== Honours of Malaysia ===
- Malaya
  - Companion of the Order of the Defender of the Realm (JMN) (1958)
  - Commander of the Order of the Defender of the Realm (PMN) – Tan Sri (1962)
- Malaysia
  - Recipient of the Malaysian Commemorative Medal (Gold) (PPM) (1965)
- Johor
  - Knight Grand Commander of the Order of the Crown of Johor (SPMJ) – Dato’ (1959)
  - First Class of the Sultan Ibrahim Medal (PIS I) (1961)

=== Places named after him ===
Several places were named after him, including:

- Tan Sri Dato' Haji Hassan Yunos Stadium in Johor Bahru, Johor
- Jalan Dato Haji Hassan Yunus in Bandar Penawar, Johor
- SMK Dato Haji Hassan Yunus, a secondary school in Renggam, Johor
