= Jaafar Muhammad =

Malay statesman

Yang Berhormat Dato' Jaafar Haji Muhammad DK (Johor) SPMJ CMG
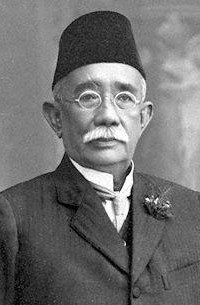

1st Menteri Besar of Johor
- In office 1886–1919
- Preceded by: Office established
- Succeeded by: Mohamed Mahbob

Personal details
- Born: 1838 Teluk Belanga, Singapore, Straits Settlements
- Died: 3 July 1919 (aged 80–81) Bukit Senyum, Johor Bahru, Johor
- Resting place: Mahmoodiah Royal Mausoleum
- Spouse(s): Esah bte Ibrahim; Emon bte Abu Talib; Datin Selamah Ambak; Rogayah Hanim
- Relations: Hussein Onn (grandson); Hishammuddin Hussein (great-grandson); Onn Hafiz Ghazi (great-great-grandson)
- Children: Onn Jaafar

Jaafar bin Haji Muhammad (Jawi: جعفر بن محمد, b. 1838 – d. 3 July 1919) D.K., S.P.M.J., C.M.G. was the first and longest serving Dato' Menteri Besar (Chief Minister) of the independent kingdom of Johor (today a state in the Federation of Malaysia), an office he held from 1886 until his death.

== Early life ==
Jaafar was born in Teluk Belanga, Singapore, Straits Settlements. He received Malay and English education.

== Career ==
He began serving with the Government of Johor at 16, working as a trainee clerk in the Office of the Minister Raja Temenggong Daeng Ibrahim. In 1856 he was appointed clerk in the Office of the Minister, and then he served as deputy for the Menteri Besar until 1882. He was Sultan Abu Bakar's escort in the latter's first trip to Europe in 1866. He took office in 1885 when Temenggong Abu Bakar made himself sultan and created a bureaucratic administration for Johor. During his term as Chief Minister, Jaafar was tasked with carrying out state administration when Abu Bakar went overseas. His residence for most of the latter part of his life was the Istana Bukit Senyum which was built in 1883. A high school behind the palace – Sekolah Dato' Jaafar – is named after him. In 1904 he was appointed by Sultan Ibrahim, Abu Bakar's son and successor as regent.

== Personal life ==
Jaafar was married five times with five wives, Esah bte Ibrahim, Emon bte Abu Talib, Datin Selamah Ambak and Rogayah Hanim. Three of his sons also went on to serve as Menteri Besar after him, including the father of modern Malay nationalism, Dato' Onn Jaafar.

== Death ==
He died in 1919 in Bukit Senyum, Johor Bahru and was buried with full honors at the Mahmoodiah Royal Mausoleum.

== Honours ==
- Johor
  - Knight Grand Commander of the Order of the Crown of Johor (SPMJ) – Dato' (1886)
  - Grand Commander of the Royal Family Order of Johor (DK I) (1903)
- United Kingdom
  - Honorary Companion of the Order of St Michael and St George (CMG) (1897)
