= Mohamed Khaled Nordin =

Malaysian politician (born 1958)

Yang Berhormat Dato' Seri Haji Mohamed Khaled Nordin SPMJ SMIJ SPMP SIMP PNBS DSPN PSI I PIS MP
- محمد خالد نوردين
- Khaled in 2024

Minister of Defence
- Incumbent
- Assumed office 12 December 2023
- Monarchs: Abdullah (2023–2024); Ibrahim (since 2024)
- Prime Minister: Anwar Ibrahim
- Deputy: Adly Zahari
- Preceded by: Mohamad Hasan
- Constituency: Kota Tinggi

Minister of Higher Education
- In office 3 December 2022 – 12 December 2023
- Monarch: Abdullah
- Prime Minister: Anwar Ibrahim
- Deputy: Yusof Apdal
- Preceded by: Noraini Ahmad
- Succeeded by: Zambry Abdul Kadir
- Constituency: Kota Tinggi
- In office 18 March 2008 – 14 May 2013
- Monarchs: Mizan Zainal Abidin (2008–2011); Abdul Halim (2011–2013)
- Prime Minister: Abdullah Ahmad Badawi (2008–2009); Najib Razak (2009–2013)
- Deputy: Hou Kok Chung; Idris Haron (2008–2009); Saifuddin Abdullah (2009–2013)
- Preceded by: Mustapa Mohamed
- Succeeded by: Idris Jusoh
- Constituency: Pasir Gudang

Minister of Entrepreneur and Cooperatives Development
- In office 27 March 2004 – 18 March 2008
- Monarchs: Syed Sirajuddin (2004–2006); Mizan Zainal Abidin (2006–2008)
- Prime Minister: Abdullah Ahmad Badawi
- Deputy: Khamsiyah Yeop
- Preceded by: Nazri Aziz (Entrepreneur Development); Kasitah Gaddam (Cooperatives)
- Succeeded by: Noh Omar
- Constituency: Pasir Gudang

Deputy Minister of Works
- In office 15 December 1999 – 26 March 2004
- Monarchs: Salahuddin (1999–2001); Syed Sirajuddin (2001–2004)
- Prime Minister: Mahathir Mohamad (1999–2003); Abdullah Ahmad Badawi (2003–2004)
- Minister: Samy Vellu
- Preceded by: Railey Jeffrey
- Succeeded by: Mohd Zin Mohamed
- Constituency: Johor Bahru

15th Menteri Besar of Johor
- In office 14 May 2013 – 12 May 2018
- Monarch: Ibrahim
- Preceded by: Abdul Ghani Othman
- Succeeded by: Osman Sapian
- Constituency: Permas

Non-independent and Non-executive Chairman of the Boustead Holdings
- In office 1 May 2020 – 5 August 2021
- Minister: Ismail Sabri Yaakob
- Chief Executive Officer: Amrin Awaluddin
- Preceded by: Mohd Ghazali Che Mat
- Succeeded by: Mohd Redzuan Md Yusof

Vice President of the United Malays National Organisation
- Incumbent
- Assumed office 30 June 2018 Serving with: Ismail Sabri Yaakob (2018–2023) &; Mahdzir Khalid (2018–2023) &; Wan Rosdy Wan Ismail (since 2023) &; Johari Abdul Ghani (since 2023)
- President: Ahmad Zahid Hamidi
- Preceded by: Hishamuddin Hussein

State Chairman of the United Malays National Organisation of Johor
- In office 27 January 2023 – 7 December 2023
- President: Ahmad Zahid Hamidi
- Deputy: Nur Jazlan Mohamed (January–March 2023); Ahmad Maslan (March–December 2023)
- Preceded by: Hasni Mohammad
- Succeeded by: Onn Hafiz Ghazi

Member of the Malaysian Parliament for Kota Tinggi
- Incumbent
- Assumed office 19 November 2022
- Preceded by: Halimah Mohamed Sadique (BN–UMNO)
- Majority: 8,390 (2022)

Member of the Johor State Legislative Assembly for Permas
- In office 5 May 2013 – 9 May 2018
- Preceded by: Munusamy Mareemuthu (BN–MIC)
- Succeeded by: Che Zakaria Mohd Salleh (PH–BERSATU)
- Majority: 5,752 (2013)

Member of the Malaysian Parliament for Pasir Gudang
- In office 21 March 2004 – 5 May 2013
- Preceded by: Position established
- Succeeded by: Normala Abdul Samad (BN–UMNO)
- Majority: 31,121 (2004); 17,281 (2008)

Member of the Malaysian Parliament for Johor Bahru
- In office 21 October 1990 – 21 March 2004
- Preceded by: Shahrir Abdul Samad (Independent)
- Succeeded by: Shahrir Abdul Samad (BN–UMNO)
- Majority: 8,166 (1990); 34,118 (1995); 24,558 (1999)

Faction represented in Dewan Rakyat
- 1990–2013: Barisan Nasional
- 2022–: Barisan Nasional

Faction represented in the Johor State Legislative Assembly
- 2013–2018: Barisan Nasional

Personal details
- Born: Mohamed Khaled bin Nordin; 30 November 1958 (age 67) Muar, Johor, Federation of Malaya (now Malaysia)
- Citizenship: Malaysia
- Party: United Malays National Organisation (UMNO) (1983–present)
- Other political affiliations: Barisan Nasional (BN) (1983–present)
- Spouse: Rosni Omar
- Children: Akmal Saufi Mohamed Khaled
- Education: University of Malaya
- Occupation: Politician

Mohamed Khaled bin Nordin (Jawi: محمد خالد بن نوردين; born 30 November 1958) is a Malaysian politician who has served as the Minister of Defence since December 2023 and previously served as the Minister of Higher Education prior to the 2023 cabinet reshuffle for the second term from December 2022 to December 2023 in the Unity Government administration under Prime Minister Anwar Ibrahim. He had previously served as Deputy Minister of Works, Minister of Entrepreneur and Cooperatives Development and his first term as Minister of Higher Education in the Barisan Nasional (BN) administration under former Prime Ministers Mahathir Mohamad, Abdullah Ahmad Badawi and Najib Razak from 1999 to 2013. Additionally, he served as the 15th Menteri Besar of Johor after he contested and became a Member of the Johor State Legislative Assembly (MLA) for Permas from May 2013 to May 2018. Throughout his political career, he has been the Member of Parliament (MP) for 3 different Johorean federal constituencies, which are Johor Bahru from October 1990 to March 2004, Pasir Gudang from March 2004 to May 2013 and currently for Kota Tinggi since November 2022. He is a member and the Division Chief of Pasir Gudang of the United Malays National Organisation (UMNO), a component party of the Barisan Nasional (BN) coalition. He has served as one of the Vice Presidents of UMNO since June 2018 and had also served as the State Chairman of UMNO of Johor from January to December 2023.

In his corporate career he had served as Non-Independent and Non-Executive Chairman of the Boustead Holdings from May 2020 to his resignation in August 2022 and had also served as Chairman of the Johor Corporation Berhad.

== Early life ==
Khaled is of Banjar descent. He was born in Muar, Johor, Malaysia. He received his early education at Sekolah Rendah Ledang Tangkak and High School Muar later before continued to English College Johore Bahru. Khaled further his studies at University of Malaya and graduated with a law degree in 1982.

== Career ==
Before entering politics, Khaled worked for the Malaysian oil giant Petronas. In the 1980s he worked as an adviser to Shahrir Abdul Samad, a federal minister.

== Politics ==
Khaled entered the federal parliament himself in the 1990 election, at the age of 31, winning the seat of Johor Bahru against a Semangat 46 (S46) candidate. In 2004 he became the Minister of Entrepreneur and Cooperatives Development, and in 2008 was appointed as the Minister of Higher Education. After 23 years at federal politics, he shifted to the Johor State Legislative Assembly in the 2013 election, winning the seat of Permas. The Barisan Nasional coalition held its majority in the assembly, and Khaled took over as the state's 15th Menteri Besar of Johor. In the 2018 election somehow, Khaled contested concurrently the Pasir Gudang parliamentary and Permas state seats but was defeated both which also witnessed BN lost in the federal and state governments to Pakatan Harapan (PH). Khaled decided not to contest the 2022 Johor state election which will be for the first time held separately for the federal and state elections.

== Election results ==
Parliament of Malaysia
| Year | Constituency | Candidate | Votes | Pct | Opponent(s) | Votes | Pct | Ballots cast | Majority | Turnout |
|---|---|---|---|---|---|---|---|---|---|---|
| 1990 | P130 Johor Bahru | Mohamed Khaled Nordin (UMNO) | 24,980 | 58.47% | Jaafar Onn (S46) | 16,814 | 39.35% | 43,856 | 8,166 | 67.54% |
| 1990 | P130 Johor Bahru | Mohamed Khaled Nordin (UMNO) | 24,980 | 58.47% | Ismail Wanjor (IND) | 930 | 2.18% | 43,856 | 8,166 | 67.54% |
| 1995 | P141 Johor Bahru | Mohamed Khaled Nordin (UMNO) | 40,141 | 79.76% | Zahrah Mohd Yusof (S46) | 6,023 | 11.97% | 52,424 | 34,118 | 70.56% |
| 1995 | P141 Johor Bahru | Mohamed Khaled Nordin (UMNO) | 40,141 | 79.76% | Tan Tien Lim (PBS) | 4,165 | 8.28% | 52,424 | 34,118 | 70.56% |
| 1999 | P141 Johor Bahru | Mohamed Khaled Nordin (UMNO) | 38,707 | 73.23% | Abdul Razak Ahmad (PRM) | 14,149 | 26.77% | 54,588 | 24,558 | 70.13% |
| 2004 | P159 Pasir Gudang | Mohamed Khaled Nordin (UMNO) | 38,123 | 84.48% | A. Razak Ahmad (PKR) | 7,002 | 15.52% | 46,178 | 31,121 | 75.49% |
| 2008 | P159 Pasir Gudang | Mohamed Khaled Nordin (UMNO) | 35,849 | 65.88% | Md Rizan Mohd Saman (PKR) | 18,568 | 34.12% | 55,891 | 17,281 | 76.71% |
| 2018 | P159 Pasir Gudang | Mohamed Khaled Nordin (UMNO) | 36,889 | 35.21% | Hassan Abdul Karim (PKR) | 61,615 | 58.80% | 106,576 | 24,726 | 85.83% |
| 2018 | P159 Pasir Gudang | Mohamed Khaled Nordin (UMNO) | 36,889 | 35.21% | Ab. Aziz Abdullah (PAS) | 6,278 | 5.99% | 106,576 | 24,726 | 85.83% |
| 2022 | P156 Kota Tinggi | Mohamed Khaled Nordin (UMNO) | 25,410 | 53.68% | Ridhwan Rasman (BERSATU) | 17,020 | 35.96% | 47,333 | 8,390 | 77.23% |
| 2022 | P156 Kota Tinggi | Mohamed Khaled Nordin (UMNO) | 25,410 | 53.68% | Onn Jaafar (AMANAH) | 4,903 | 10.36% | 47,333 | 8,390 | 77.23% |

Johor State Legislative Assembly
| Year | Constituency | Candidate | Votes | Pct | Opponent(s) | Votes | Pct | Ballots cast | Majority | Turnout |
|---|---|---|---|---|---|---|---|---|---|---|
| 2013 | N43 Permas | Mohamed Khaled Nordin (UMNO) | 23,952 | 55.79% | Syed Othman Abdullah (PAS) | 18,200 | 42.39% | 42,932 | 5,752 | 86.90% |
| 2018 | N43 Permas | Mohamed Khaled Nordin (UMNO) | 20,047 | 37.81% | Che Zakaria Mohd Salleh (BERSATU) | 28,793 | 54.30% | 53,929 | 8,746 | 85.48% |
| 2018 | N43 Permas | Mohamed Khaled Nordin (UMNO) | 20,047 | 37.81% | Ab. Aziz Abdullah (PAS) | 4,181 | 7.89% | 53,929 | 8,746 | 85.48% |

== Honours ==
=== Honours of Malaysia ===
- Malaysia
  - Recipient of the 13th Yang di-Pertuan Agong Installation Medal
  - Recipient of the 14th Yang di-Pertuan Agong Installation Medal
  - Recipient of the 17th Yang di-Pertuan Agong Installation Medal
- Johor
  - Knight Grand Commander of the Order of the Crown of Johor (SPMJ) – Dato' (2013)
  - Grand Knight of the Order of Sultan Ibrahim of Johor (SMIJ) – Dato' (2015)
  - First Class of the Sultan Ibrahim of Johor Medal (PSI I) (2017)
  - Second Class of the Sultan Ibrahim Medal (PIS II)
  - First Class of Sultan Ibrahim Ismail Coronation Medal
- Pahang
  - Knight Grand Companion of the Order of the Crown of Pahang (SIMP) – formerly Dato', now Dato' Indera (2006)
- Penang
  - Officer of the Order of the Defender of State (DSPN) – Dato' (2002)
- Perak
  - Knight Grand Commander of the Order of the Perak State Crown (SPMP) – Dato' Seri (2006)
- Sarawak
  - Knight Commander of the Most Exalted Order of the Star of Sarawak (PNBS) – Dato Sri (2008)

== See also ==
- Johor Bahru (federal constituency)
- Pasir Gudang (federal constituency)

Political offices
| Preceded by Abdul Ghani Othman | Menteri Besar of Johor; 14 May 2013 – 10 May 2018 | Succeeded by Osman Sapian |
