= Mahmoodiah Royal Mausoleum =

Mausoleum

Coordinates: 1°27′50.4″N 103°44′53.1″E

- Makam Diraja Mahmoodiah
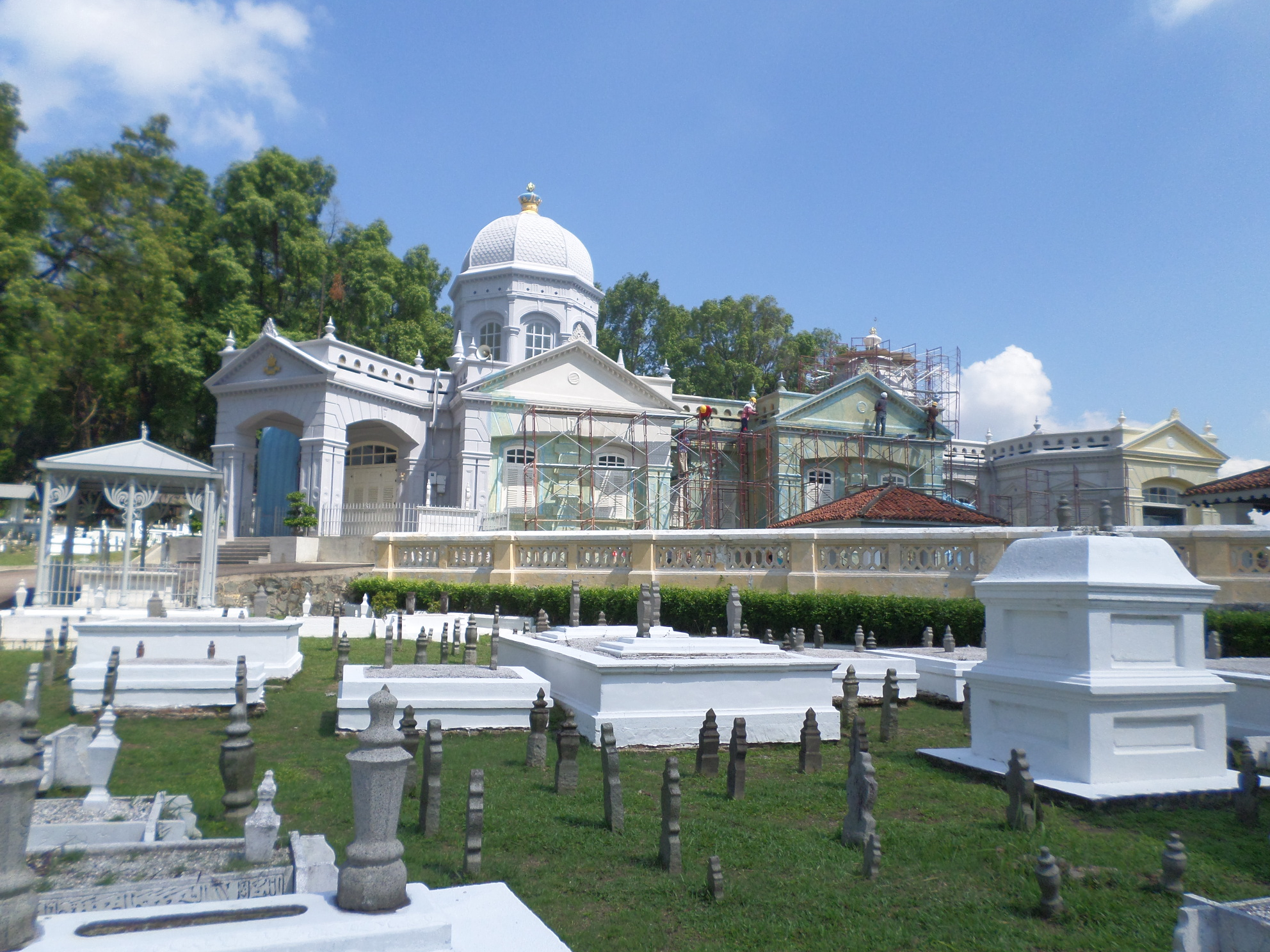
- Interactive map of Mahmoodiah Royal Mausoleum

Details
- Established: 1895
- Location: Johor Bahru, Johor, Malaysia
- Type: Royal mausoleum
- Style: Victorian, Moorish, Malay

The Mahmoodiah Royal Mausoleum (Malay: Makam Diraja Mahmoodiah) is a Royal Mausoleum of Johor located at Bukit Mahmoodiah in Jalan Mahmoodiah, Johor Bahru, Malaysia. The first Sultan of Johor buried here was Sultan Abu Bakar in 1895. Besides, the founder of UMNO, Dato' Onn Jaafar (died in 1962) was buried next to his father, Dato' Jaafar bin Muhammad's grave (died in 1919).

== Architecture ==
The Mahmoodiah Royal Mausoleum was built in 1895. The mausoleum architecture is a combination of Victorian, Moorish and local Malay styles.

== List of graves ==
=== Sultan graves ===
==== Sultan of Johor ====
- Sultan Sir Abu Bakar ibni Almarhum Temenggong Daeng Ibrahim Sri Maharaja Johor (died: 4 June 1895)
- Sultan Sir Ibrahim Al-Masyhur ibni Almarhum Sultan Sir Abu Bakar (died: 8 May 1959)
- Sultan Sir Ismail Al-Khalidi ibni Almarhum Sultan Sir Ibrahim Al-Masyhur (died: 10 May 1981)
- Sultan Iskandar Al-Mutawakkil Alallah ibni Almarhum Sultan Ismail Al-Khalidi – 8th Yang di-Pertuan Agong (1984–1989) (died: 22 January 2010)

==== Other Sultans grave ====
- Sultan Ismail Muabidin Riayat Shah ibni Almarhum Raja Thith Hitam (Marhum Mangkat di Skudai) – 25th Sultan of Perak (1871–1874) (died: unknown date) – exiled from Perak after the assassination of British Resident of Perak, JWW Birch in Pasir Salak on 2 November 1875.

=== Sultanah/Consort graves ===
- Sultanah Fatimah (died 1891)
- Tunku Ampuan Maimunah binti Almarhum Ungku Abdul Majid (died 1909)
- Sultanah Rogayah (died 1926)
- Sultanah Aminah binti Almarhum Ungku Ahmad (died 1977)
- Enche' Besar Khalsom binti Abdullah (died 2018)
- Tengku Zanariah binti Almarhum Tengku Ahmad (died 2019)

=== Johor Royal Family ===
Descendants of Temeggong Daeng Ibrahim

- Ungku Abdul Majid bin Temenggong Ibrahim (died 1889)
- Ungku Abdul Rahman bin Ungku Abdul Majid (died: 1921)
- Ungku Abdullah bin Ungku Suleiman (died: unknown date)
- Ungku Ali bin Ungku Ahmad (died: unknown date)
- Ungku Haji Abdul Rahman bin Ungku Abdul Majid – Naib Yang di-Pertua Majlis Agama Islam Negeri Johor (died: unknown date)
- Ungku Hasanah binti Ungku Abdul Majid (died: unknown date)
- Ungku Ismail bin Ungku Abdul Rahman (died: unknown date)
- Tunku Abdul Rahman ibni Almarhum Sultan Ismail – Tunku Aris Bendahara Johor (died: 12 July 1989)
- Ungku Esah binti Ungku Abdul Majid (died: 7 September 2014)
- Tunku Maimunah binti Almarhum Sultan Ismail (died: 11 July 2012)
- Tunku Osman ibni Almarhum Tunku Temenggong Ahmad – President of the Johor Royal Court Council (died: 6 July 2014)
- Tunku Meriam binti Almarhum Sultan Ibrahim – daughter of Sultan Ibrahim al-Masyhur (died 2014)
- Tunku Abdul Jalil ibni Sultan Ibrahim – Tunku Laksamana Johor (died: 5 December 2015)
- Ungku Yusoff bin Ungku Abdul Rahman – Jumaah Majlis DiRaja Johor (Johor Royal Court Council) Member (died: 29 July 2020)

==== Other royal family graves ====
- Raja Mahadi bin Raja Sulaiman (Selangor) – Chieftain of Klang, Selangor during Klang War (1866–1874) (died: 1882) – exiled from Selangor after defeat in the war in 1874.

=== Leaders graves ===
==== Dato' Menteri Besar of Johor ====
Bendahara dynasty

- Dato' Jaafar Haji Muhammad – First Menteri Besar (died 1919)
  - 1.Abdullah Jaafar
  - 3.Mustafa Jaafar
  - 6.Dato' Haji Sir Onn Jaafar – six Menteri Besar, UMNO first president (died 1962)
  - Dato' Abdul Hamid Yusof ms:Abdul Hamid Yusof - Fifth Menteri Besar (died 1934)

temeggong dynasty

- Dato’ Wan Idris III Wan Ibrahim III – Ninth Menteri Besar (died 1973)

non

- Tan Sri Hassan Yunus – First elected Menteri Besar (died 1968)
- Tan Sri Othman Saat – Eleventh Menteri Besar (died 2007)

==== Other leaders ====
- Dato' Mohamed Salleh Perang – Dato' Bentara Luar (Architect of Development Johor) (died 1915)
- Dato' Abdul Rahman Mohamed Yassin – First President of the Dewan Negara (died 1970)
  - Dato' Suleiman Abdul Rahman – First Minister of the Interior (died 1963)
  - Tun Dr. Awang Hassan – son-in-law kepada Rahman Yassin, 5th Governor of Penang (died 1998)
- Tan Sri Abdul Hamid Jumat – 1st Deputy Chief Minister of Singapore (died 1978)

=== Non-leaders grave ===
- Dato' Sayyid Alwi Thahir al-Haddad – Former Mufti of Johor (died 1962)
- Tan Sri Zainon Munshi Sulaiman (Ibu Zain) – Malayan woman political, nationalist and educational (died 1989)
- Tan Sri Anwar Abdul Malik – Malayan political figure (died 1998)

== See also ==
- Sultan of Johor
- Sultan Abdul Samad Mausoleum, Bukit Jugra, Jugra, Kuala Langat, Selangor
- Shah Alam Royal Mausoleum, Shah Alam, Selangor
- Kelantan Royal Mausoleum, Kota Bharu, Kelantan
- Pahang Old Royal Mausoleum, Kampung Marhum, Kuala Pahang, Pekan, Pahang
- Al-Ghufran Royal Mausoleum, Kuala Kangsar, Perak
- Seri Menanti Royal Mausoleum, Seri Menanti, Kuala Pilah, Negeri Sembilan
