= Abdul Ghani Othman =

Malaysian politician (born 1946)

Yang Berbahagia Tan Sri Dato' Abdul Ghani Othman DK I (Johor) DK II (Johor) PSM SPMJ SMJ PIS
- عبدالغني عثمان

14th Menteri Besar of Johor
- In office 3 May 1995 – 14 May 2013
- Monarchs: Iskandar; Ibrahim
- Preceded by: Muhyiddin Yassin
- Succeeded by: Mohamed Khaled Nordin
- Constituency: Serom

Minister of Youth and Sports
- In office 1 December 1993 – 24 April 1995
- Monarchs: Azlan Shah; Ja'afar
- Deputy: Teng Gaik Kwan
- Preceded by: Annuar Musa
- Succeeded by: Muhyiddin Yassin
- Constituency: Ledang

Member of the Malaysian Parliament for Ledang
- In office 3 August 1986 – 24 April 1995
- Preceded by: Ngah Abdul Rahman (UMNO-BN)
- Succeeded by: Hashim Ismail (UMNO-BN)
- Majority: 10,665 (1986); 7,547 (1990)

Member of the Johor State Legislative Assembly for Serom
- In office 25 April 1995 – 5 May 2013
- Preceded by: Hashim Ismail (UMNO-BN)
- Succeeded by: Abd Razak Minhat (UMNO-BN)
- Majority: 13,496 (1995); 8,248 (1999); 8,081 (2004); 4,971 (2008)

Senator (Appointed by the Yang di-Pertuan Agong)
- In office 11 December 1984 – July 1986
- Monarch: Iskandar
- Prime Minister: Mahathir Mohamad

Personal details
- Born: Abdul Ghani bin Othman; 14 November 1946 (age 79) Sungai Mati, Johor, Malayan Union
- Citizenship: Malaysia
- Party: United Malays National Organisation (UMNO)
- Other political affiliations: Barisan Nasional (BN)
- Spouse: Jamilah Ariffin
- Education: La Trobe University; University of Queensland
- Occupation: Politician

Abdul Ghani bin Othman (Jawi: عبدالغاني بن عثمان; born 14 November 1946) served as the 14th Menteri Besar of Johor in Malaysia from 1995 to 2013. He is a member of the United Malays National Organisation (UMNO), a component party of Barisan Nasional (BN) coalition. He had held the political party position of Ledang Division Chairman, Johor State Liaison Chairman and National Supreme Council member of UMNO before. Currently, he serves as the Chairman of Sime Darby Berhad, starting from 1 July 2013.

== Early life and education ==
He received his primary education at Tangkak Boys School (Sekolah Laki-Laki Tangkak) before entering Muar High School (Sekolah Tinggi Muar). Qualifying for a Colombo Plan scholarship, Abdul Ghani furthered his studies at La Trobe University in Melbourne, Australia. He graduated with a bachelor's degree in economics (Hons). Prior to returning to Malaysia, Abdul Ghani completed a master's degree in economics at the University of Queensland. Upon returning to his homeland, he joined the Economics Faculty of University Malaya (1974–1980) and within several years, was promoted to be the Dean of the School (1980–1984). In addition to that, he also served as Master of First College (Residential) for University of Malaya (1979 – 1984).

== Political career ==
Abdul Ghani's political career began when he was first appointed to be a Senator (December 1984 - July 1986). This was followed by his election to the Federal Parliament in 1986 general election for Ledang seat.

From May 1987 to November 1990, Abdul Ghani held the post of Deputy Minister for Energy, Telecommunication and Post. Subsequently, he was then given the portfolio of Deputy Minister of Finance from 1990 to 1993.

In December 1993, Abdul Ghani was promoted to become the Minister of Youth and Sports (1 December 1993 - March 1995). He immediately initiated a national youth program called 'Rakan Muda' (Young Friend), which helped mobilise Malaysian youths through healthy activities such as sports and cultural events.

Abdul Ghani won the Johor State Legislative Assembly seat of Serom in the 1995 general election. In March 1995, Abdul Ghani was appointed to become the Menteri Besar of Johor and has held that position for the next 17 years.

During the 2013 Malaysian general election however, he was defeated in an upset result by Democratic Action Party (DAP) advisor Lim Kit Siang in Gelang Patah, Johor and was replaced by Mohamed Khaled Nordin as Menteri Besar for Johor.

== Controversy ==
=== Bangsa Malaysia ===
Ghani did not agree with the Bangsa Malaysia concept and alleging that Bangsa Malaysia was a "nebulous concept" which overstepped the bounds of the Constitution. "Even if the term Bangsa Malaysia is to be used, it must only be applied in the context of all the peoples of Malaysia with the Malays as the pivotal race," he said.

Ghani insisted that those advocating Bangsa Malaysia were echoing Lee Kuan Yew's call for a Malaysian Malaysia made during the early 1960s when Singapore was a state in Malaysia, even though the campaign had been repudiated by the government.

After the 2006 UMNO Annual General Assembly, Ghani elaborated that his opposition to Bangsa Malaysia and Malaysian Malaysia was because:

It is about everything being equal and this does not capture the hearts of Malaysians. Therefore, regardless of whatever name is given, the concept is similar and this is against idea kenegaraan (the idea of nationhood) which we have inherited.

Ghani defined his idea kenegaraan as "the idea that has united the Malays, and also the same idea that has given privileges to other races to be citizens, live together and share power and prosperity."

== Election results ==
Parliament of Malaysia
Year	Constituency	Candidate	Votes	Pct	Opponent(s)	Votes	Pct	Ballots cast	Majority	Turnout
1986	P116 Ledang	Abdul Ghani Othman (UMNO)	21,558	66.43%	Lee Tiong King (DAP)	10,893	33.57%	33,679	10,665	71.39%
1990	P116 Ledang	Abdul Ghani Othman (UMNO)	21,802	60.47%	Othman Tambi (S46)	14,255	39.53%	37,569	7,547	73.13%
2013	P162 Gelang Patah	Abdul Ghani Othman (UMNO)	39,522	42.04%	Lim Kit Siang (DAP)	54,284	57.74%	95,071	14,762	89.08%

Johor State Legislative Assembly
Year	Constituency	Candidate	Votes	Pct	Opponent(s)	Votes	Pct	Ballots cast	Majority	Turnout
1995	N04 Serom	Abdul Ghani Othman (UMNO)	16,789	80.15%	Husni Md. Alip (S46)	3,293	15.72%	20,946	13,496	71.79%
1999	N04 Serom	Abdul Ghani Othman (UMNO)	14,652	67.12%	Abdullah Husin (PAS)	6,404	29.34%	21,830	8,248	71.75%
2004	N11 Serom	Abdul Ghani Othman (UMNO)	11,276	75.99%	Abu Bakar Tambi (PAS)	3,195	21.53%	14,838	8,081	73.08%
2008	N11 Serom	Abdul Ghani Othman (UMNO)	10,088	64.63%	Rusman Kemin (PAS)	5,117	32.78%	15,609	4,971	75.85%

== Honours and awards ==
The Sultan of Johor awarded Abdul Ghani the Order of the Crown of Johor; Setia Mahkota Johor (SMJ) medal in 1989 and the Royal Family Order of Johor; Darjah Kerabat Johor Yang Amat Dihormati Pangkat Kedua (D.K. II) in 1996. He was then conferred the Darjah Seri Paduka Mahkota Johor (SPMJ) in 2004, which carries the title Dato'.

On 9 April 2009, Sultan Iskandar bestowed upon Abdul Ghani the highest award in the State of Johor, DK (I). It is very rare for a commoner to receive such an award, which is normally given to royals.

=== Honours of Malaysia ===
- Malaysia
  - Commander of the Order of Loyalty to the Crown of Malaysia (PSM) – Tan Sri (2014)
- Johor
  - First Class of the Royal Family Order of Johor (DK I) (2009)
  - Second Class of the Royal Family Order of Johor (DK II) (1996)
  - Knight Grand Commander of the Order of the Crown of Johor (SPMJ) – Dato' (2004)
  - Companion of the Order of the Crown of Johor (SMJ) (1989)
  - First Class of the Sultan Ibrahim Medal (PIS I) (2008)

Political offices
Preceded by Muhyiddin Yassin	Menteri Besar of Johor; 3 May 1995 – 14 May 2013	Succeeded by Mohamed Khaled Nordin
