= Order of precedence in Johor =

Relative preeminence of officials for ceremonial purposes

The Johor order of precedence is a nominal and symbolic hierarchy of important positions within the state of Johor. It has no legal standing but is used to dictate ceremonial protocol at events of a state nature.

== Order of precedence ==
Order of precedence in Johor is as follows:

No.	Description
1	His Majesty the Sultan
2	Her Majesty the Permaisuri
3	His Royal Highness the Crown Prince
4	Her Highness the consort of the Crown Prince
5	His Royal Highness the Deputy Crown Prince
6	The Right Honourable the Menteri Besar
7	Honourable Chairperson of the Royal Court
8	Their Highnesses the Sultan's children
9	Grand Commanders of the Royal Family Order of Johor (DK I)
10	Commanders of the Royal Family Order of Johor (DK II)
11	Grand Commanders of the Most Distinguished Order of the Defender of the State (SMN); Grand Commanders of the Distinguished Order of Loyalty to the Crown of Malaysia (SSM)
12	Their Honours Judges of the High Court
13	Honourable Speaker of the Legislative Assembly
14	Honourable State Secretary
15	Honourable Members of the Executive Council
16	Members of the Royal Court
17	Honourable State Legal Adviser
18	Honourable State Financial Officer
19	Honourable Federal Ministers
20	State Mufti
21	Vice Chancellor of Universiti Teknologi Malaysia
22	Honourable Federal Deputy Ministers
23	Their Highnesses Members of the State Royal Family
24	Commander of the 7th Brigade
25	State Police Chief
26	the Dato' Bergelar
27	Tan Sri; Federal and State Datuk
28	Honourable Members of the Legislative Assembly
29	Honourable Senators representing the State
30	Honourable Members of the House of Representatives representing the State
31	Chairperson of the State Public Service Commission
32	Members of the State Public Service Commission
33	Members of the State Islamic Affairs Council
34	Head of Federal and State Departments
35	Justices of the Peace
36	State Administrative Officers
37	Headmen
38	Local Councillors
39	Recipients of honours from other states
40	Recipients of Federal honours

== See also ==
- List of post-nominal letters (Johor)
