= Abdul Rahman Andak =

Former State Secretary of Johore

Yang Berhormat Dato' Sri Amar DiRaja Abdul Rahman Wan Andak DK II (Johor) SPMJ CMG
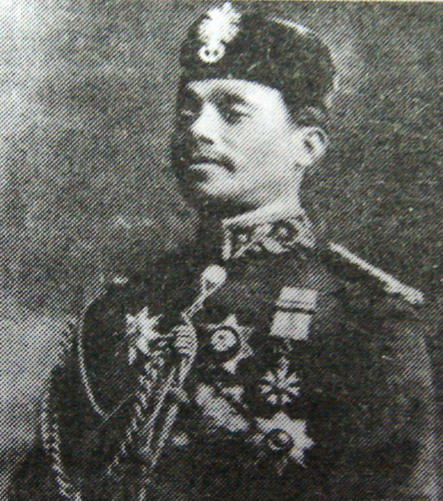

State Secretary of Johor
- In office 1893 – April 1909
- Appointed by: Abu Bakar
- Monarchs: Abu Bakar (1886–1895); Ibrahim (1895–1959)
- Succeeded by: Mohamed Mahbob

Personal details
- Born: 13 June 1859 Teluk Belanga, Singapore, Straits Settlements
- Died: 10 September 1930 (aged 71) London, United Kingdom
- Resting place: Brookwood Cemetery, Surrey
- Spouses: Che' Lembek (died 1885); Auguste Reis (before 1930)
- Children: Rahmah Abdul Rahman (daughter); Henry Abdul Rahman (son); Mansor Abdul Rahman (son); Walter Abdul Rahman (son)
- Parents: Andak bin Meng (father); Hawa binti Abdullah (mother)
- Known for: Adviser to Sultan Abu Bakar and later Sultan Ibrahim

Abdul Rahman bin Wan Andak DK SPMJ CMG (13 June 1859 – 10 September 1930), was a campaigner for Johor's independence when the British were trying to extend their influence throughout Malay States. From modest origins, in 1878 he was recruited into the Johor Civil Service. He was appointed State Secretary of Johor in 1893 and for twenty years he was adviser to Sultan Abu Bakar and Sultan Ibrahim.

== History ==
=== Early life ===
Abdul Rahman was the son of Andak bin Meng, a minor government official, with his first wife Hawa Binti Abdullah. When in 1871 the childless Maharaja Abu Bakar sent a nephew, Ungku Othman, to be educated in England Andak was sent too in recognition of his potential. Following his graduation Andak was recruited into the Johor Civil Service in 1878.

=== As Sultan's adviser ===
He became the Private Secretary to Maharajah Abu Bakar in 1884 and in 1885 he was selected by the Maharajah as one of his senior advisers to negotiate the Anglo-Johor Treaty with the British Governor Sir Frederick Weld. Under this treaty the British recognized Abu Bakar as Sultan of Johor and the Treaty became a buffer for Johor against further British colonial designs in the region. In 1886 Andak received the Order of the Crown of Johor (DPMJ) (Second Class) and the honorific title of Dato’ Sri Amar DiRaja. Andak received the Order of the Crown of Johor (SPMJ) (First Class) in 1892 and was appointed State Secretary of Johor in 1893 with a seat on the State Council.

For twenty years he was advisor to Sultan Abu Bakar (Sultan of Johor 1862–1895) and Sultan Ibrahim (Sultan of Johor 1895–1959). Andak's influence over Sultan Abu Bakar lead to the Sultan becoming increasingly reluctant to accept British advice. Andak drafted the Johor Constitution, the first to be written by any of the Malay States, and which became law in 1894. He represented Johor on behalf of the sultan leading an entourage to the 1893 World's Fair in Chicago following an invitation from the United States Consul-General to Singapore Rounsevelle Wildman.

Andak was the founder of the Pakatan Belajar Mengajar Pengetahuan Bahasa ("Language Knowledge Teaching Pact), a literary society which increased the usage of the Malay language and made it the official language of the government; the body was also responsible for introducing neologisms purely expressing new ideas of governance brought with British influence. It later became the Royal Society of Malay Literature of Johor.

A Freemason, he was initiated into the Lodge of St George No 1152 in Singapore in 1889.

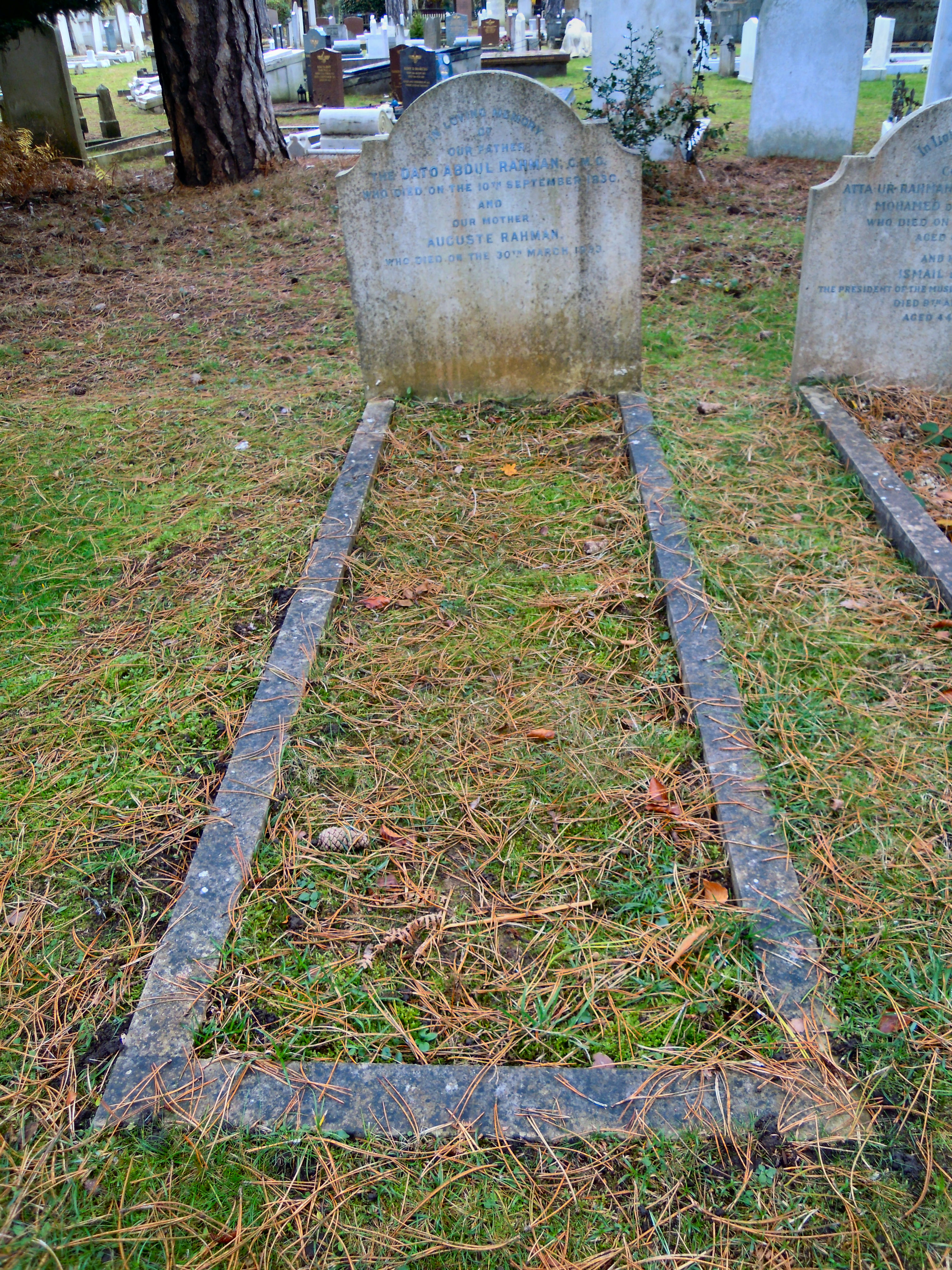
Andak's grave in Brookwood Cemetery

=== Retirement ===
The British Government attempted to stop the government of Johor from receiving advice from its own Johor Advisory Board in London and also attempted to build a railway line across Johor. Seeing Andak as a threat to their plans, they also attempted to force his resignation. Cecil Clementi Smith wrote of him "as a clever little fellow but an absolute nobody among the Malay aristocrats". Other descriptions include "corrupt" and "a mischievous little dog". Frank Swettenham denigrated him as “a bad adviser for anyone, quite unscrupulous... and dangerous because he speaks English and has to do with Europeans all his life." Eventually he was dismissed by Sultan Ibrahim and sent into forced exile in London in April 1909 with an annual pension of £1,000. In England Andak oversaw the education of Sultan Ibrahim's sons Ismail (who succeeded his father as Sultan), Abu Bakar and Ahmad while they were attending schools in London.

=== Personal life ===
Andak married twice, firstly to Che' Lembek, who died in 1885 and with whom he had a daughter, Rahmah. He later married Auguste "Gustel" Reis (died 1933), who after the marriage took the name of Auguste Abdul Rahman and lived with her in London where they had three sons, Henry, Mansor and Walter.

== Death ==
He died in London on 10 September 1930 and was buried in the Muslim section of Brookwood Cemetery near Woking in Surrey. His wife died on 30 March 1933 and was buried beside him.
