= Heads of state governments of Malaysia =

Heads of government in Malaysia's many states take on various titles. Nine of the states in the Peninsular who each have historical monarchs are known as the Menteri Besar (Note: the title "Menteri Besar" is usually untranslated in local English media but is typically translated as 'Chief Minister' by foreign media. According to protocol, all Menteris Besar, Chief Ministers and Premier are styled Yang Amat Berhormat (abbreviated YAB), which means "The Most Honourable".) (Jawi: منتري بسر, literally Grand Minister or First Minister; abbreviated as MB), while the rest in the federation are titled Chief Minister (abbreviated as CM; in Malay: Ketua Menteri; abbreviated as KM). Until 2022, the head of government of Sarawak was also styled as the Chief Minister, thereafter it was changed to Premier (Premier).

The nine hereditary rulers of the Malay states and the appointed governors of the other four states serve as constitutional and ceremonial heads of their states, while the state executive authority rests with the Menteris Besar, chief ministers and premier. Following elections to the state legislative assembly, the ruler or governor usually invites the party (or coalition) with a majority of seats to form the state government. The ruler or governor appoints and swears in the Menteri Besar, chief ministers and premier, whose executive council (or Cabinet in Sabah and Sarawak) are collectively responsible to the assembly. Based on the Westminster system, provided that they retain the confidence of the assembly, the terms of Menteris Besar, chief ministers and premier can last for the length of the assembly's life—a maximum of five years. There are no limits to the number of terms that the Menteri Besar, chief minister and premier can serve.

== Background ==
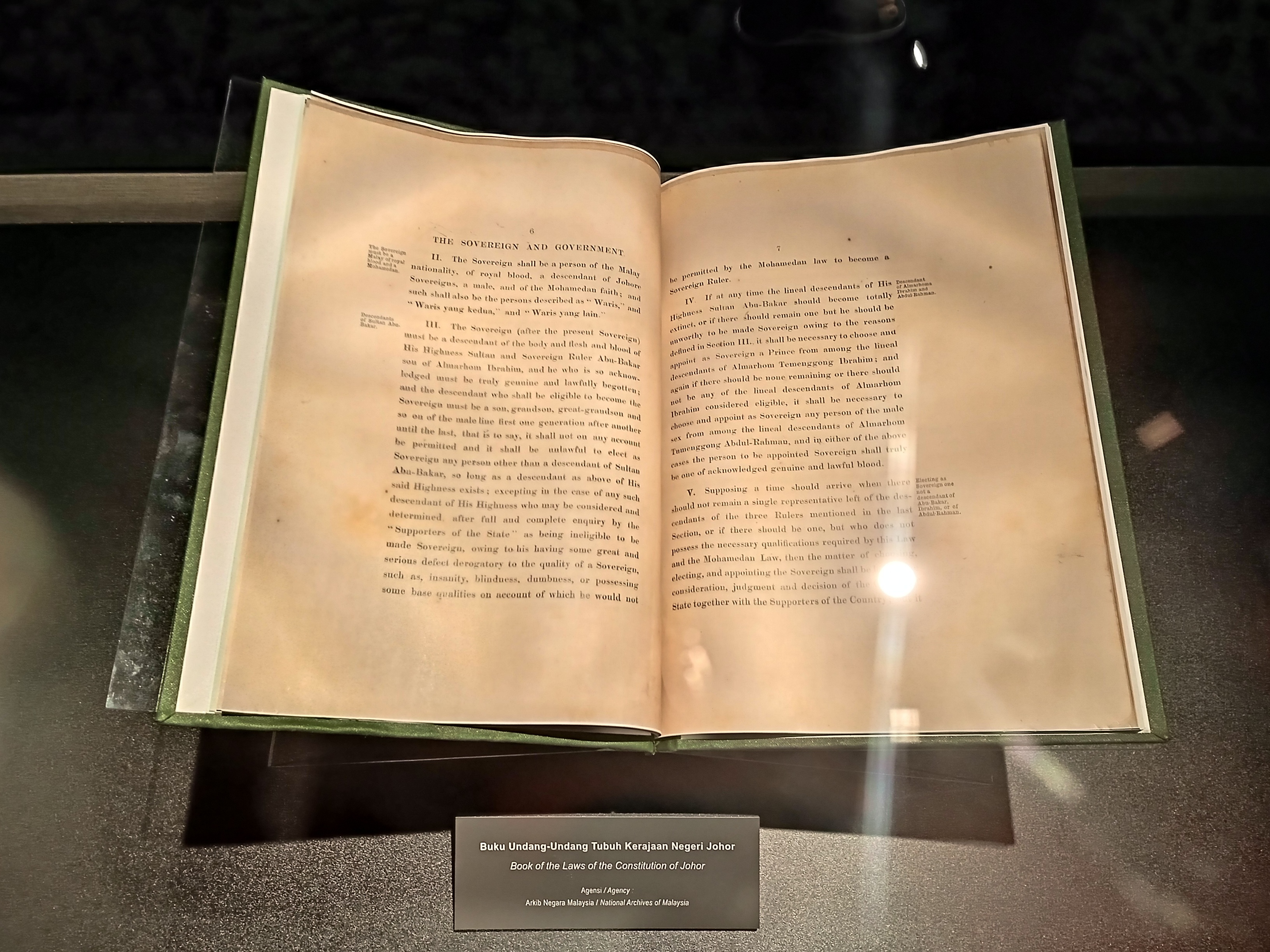
The Constitution of Johor

In most states within Malaysia, the office was created by the British colonial government in 1948, in tandem with the creation of the Federation of Malaya. However, Johor was the first state to create the Menteri Besar position, subject to Undang-undang Tubuh Negeri Johor (Johor State Constitution) enforced by Sultan Abu Bakar. This made Johor the first Malay state to adopt a system of constitutional monarchy. After Malaya gained independence from the United Kingdom in 1957, the office bearer is appointed among the state legislative assembly members by the Sultans. The Menteri Besar, chief minister and premier usually come from the party (or coalition) which commands a majority in the state assembly.

=== Relations between the Menteris Besar, chief ministers, premier and other levels of government ===
For many decades, the first ministers (Menteri Besar), chief ministers (Ketua Menteri) and premier (Premier) met with each other and the prime minister at the Meeting of Menteri Besar and Chief Ministers(Mesyuarat Menteri-Menteri Besar, Ketua-Ketua Menteri dan premier).

== Selection process ==
=== Eligibility ===
By comparison, the thirteen state constitutions (Undang-undang Tubuh Negeri or Perlembagaan Negeri) have some similarities and also some differences in setting the principal qualifications one must meet to be eligible to the office of the Menteri Besar, chief minister and premier.

A Menteri Besar or Ketua Menteri or Premier must be a Malaysian citizen, of at least 21 years of age and a member of state legislative assembly who commands the confidence of the majority of the members of the assembly. Upon appointment, he shall not hold any office of profit and engage in any trade, business or profession that will cause conflict of interest.

For four states in Malaysia with governors (namely Penang, Malacca, Sabah and Sarawak), the office of Ketua Menteri and Premier are open to any Malaysian citizen regardless of their religion, ethnicity, and gender. However, citizens by naturalization or registration are still prohibited by state laws.

=== Election ===
The Menteri Besar, chief minister and premier are elected through a majority in the state legislative assembly. This is procedurally established by the vote of confidence in the legislative assembly, as suggested by the Ruler (or Governor) of the state who is the appointing authority.

=== Oath ===
Since, according to the constitution, the Menteri Besar is appointed by the ruler (or, in case of the chief minister and premier, the governor), the swearing-in is done before the ruler (or governor) of the state.

== Remuneration ==
Remuneration of the Menteri Besar, chief minister, premier as well as other members of the executive council (or Cabinet) and members of the state legislative assembly are to be decided by the respective state legislatures. Hence this varies from state to state according to their ordinance or enactment that amended by the state legislative.

== Present Menteris Besar, chief ministers and premier ==
State	Title	Portrait	Incumbent	Party (Note: This column names only the chief minister's party. The state government he heads may be a complex coalition of several parties and independents; those are not listed here.)	Term	Time Serving
Johor	Menteri Besar		Onn Hafiz Ghazi	BN (UMNO)	15 March 2022	4 years, 249 days
Kedah	Menteri Besar		Muhammad Sanusi Md Nor	PN (PAS)	17 May 2020	6 years, 186 days
Kelantan	Menteri Besar		Mohd Nassuruddin Daud	PN (PAS)	15 August 2023	3 years, 96 days
Malacca	Chief Minister		Ab Rauf Yusoh	BN (UMNO)	31 March 2023	3 years, 233 days
Negeri Sembilan	Menteri Besar		TBA	BN (UMNO)		
Pahang	Menteri Besar		Wan Rosdy Wan Ismail	BN (UMNO)	15 May 2018	8 years, 188 days
Penang	Chief Minister		Chow Kon Yeow	PH (DAP)	14 May 2018	8 years, 189 days
Perak	Menteri Besar		Saarani Mohamad	BN (UMNO)	10 December 2020	5 years, 344 days
Perlis	Menteri Besar		Abu Bakar Hamzah	PN (BERSATU)	28 December 2025	326 days
Sabah	Chief Minister		Hajiji Noor	GRS (GAGASAN)	29 September 2020	6 years, 51 days
Sarawak	Premier		Abang Abdul Rahman Johari Abang Openg	GPS (PBB)	13 January 2017	9 years, 310 days
Selangor	Menteri Besar		Amirudin Shari	PH (PKR)	19 June 2018	8 years, 153 days
Terengganu	Menteri Besar		Ahmad Samsuri Mokhtar	PN (PAS)	10 May 2018	8 years, 193 days

== See also ==
- Opposition (Malaysia)
