= Onn Hafiz Ghazi =

Malaysian politician (born 1979)

Yang Amat Berhormat Dato' Onn Hafiz Ghazi SMIJ PMW
- عون حفيظ غازي
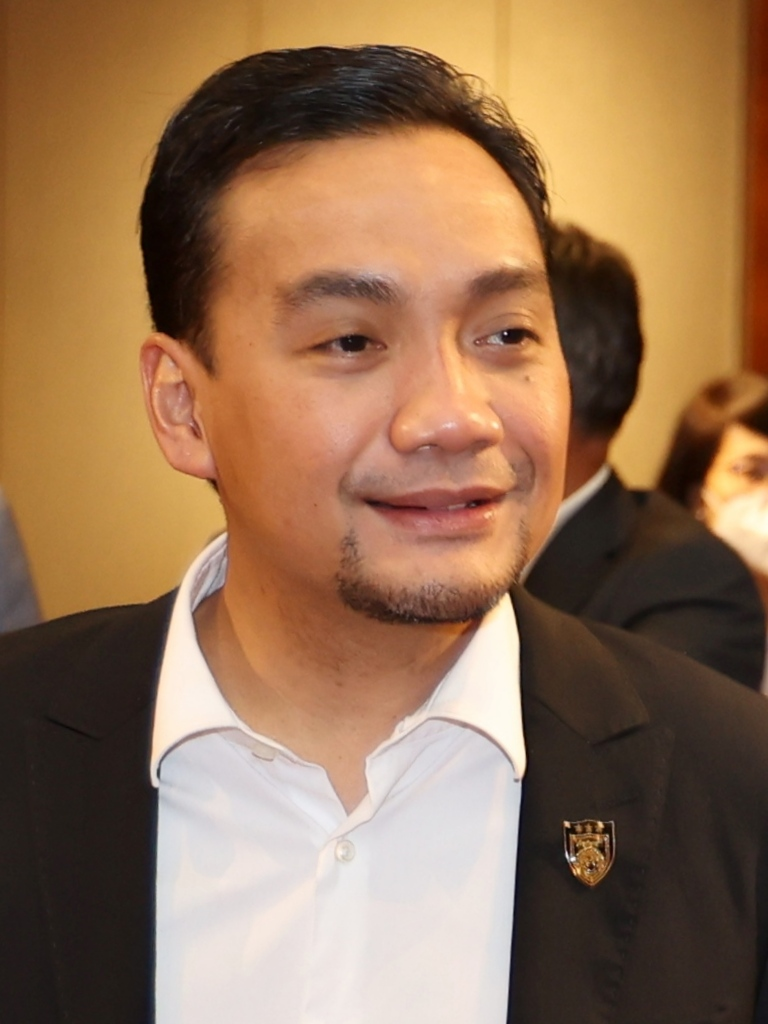
- Onn Hafiz in 2022

19th Menteri Besar of Johor
- Incumbent
- Assumed office 15 March 2022
- Monarch: Ibrahim Iskandar
- Preceded by: Hasni Mohammad
- Constituency: Machap

Member of the Johor State Executive Council

(Tourism, Youth & Sports)
- In office 6 March 2020 – 15 March 2022
- Monarch: Ibrahim Iskandar
- Menteri Besar: Hasni Mohammad
- Preceded by: Liow Cai Tung (Tourism); Sheikh Umar Bagharib Ali (Youth & Sports)
- Succeeded by: Raven Kumar Krishnasamy (Tourism); Mohd Hairi Mad Shah (Youth & Sports)
- Constituency: Layang-Layang

State Chairman of Barisan Nasional of Johor
- Incumbent
- Assumed office 5 February 2024
- National Chairman: Ahmad Zahid Hamidi
- Preceded by: Mohamed Khaled Nordin

State Chairman of the United Malays National Organisation of Johor
- Incumbent
- Assumed office 7 December 2023
- President: Ahmad Zahid Hamidi
- Deputy: Ahmad Maslan
- Preceded by: Mohamed Khaled Nordin

Member of the Johor State Legislative Assembly for Machap
- Incumbent
- Assumed office 12 March 2022
- Preceded by: Abdul Taib Abu Bakar (BN–UMNO)
- Majority: 6,543 (2022)

Member of the Johor State Legislative Assembly for Layang-Layang
- In office 9 May 2018 – 12 March 2022
- Preceded by: Abd Mutalip Abd Rahim (BN–UMNO)
- Succeeded by: Abd Mutalip Abd Rahim (BN–UMNO)
- Majority: 364 (2018)

Faction represented in the Johor State Legislative Assembly
- 2018–: Barisan Nasional

Personal details
- Born: Onn Hafiz bin Ghazi; 2 March 1979 (age 47) Simpang Renggam, Johor, Malaysia
- Party: UMNO (since 2006)
- Other political affiliations: Barisan Nasional (since 2006)
- Spouse: Sharmin Fazlina Mohd Shukor
- Relations: Jaafar Muhammad (great-great-grandfather); Onn Jaafar (great-grandfather); Mohamed Noah Omar (great-grandfather); Hussein Onn (maternal grandfather); Suhailah Noah (Maternal grandmother); Rahah Noah (maternal grandaunt); Hishammuddin Hussein (maternal uncle); Yahya Awang (maternal uncle-in-law); Najib (first cousin once removed); Nazir (first cousin once removed); Nizar (second cousin); Nazifuddin (second cousin)
- Children: 4
- Parents: Ghazi Ishak (died 2021) (father); Roquaiya Hanim Hussein (died 2006) (mother)
- Education: Royal Military College; University of Hertfordshire (BA)
- Occupation: Politician; accountant

Onn Hafiz bin Ghazi (Jawi: عون حفيظ بن غازي; born 2 March 1979) is a Malaysian politician who has served as the 19th Menteri Besar of Johor since 2022. A member of UMNO, he served as member of the Johor State Legislative Assembly for Machap since 2022, having previously served in the same position for Layang-Layang from 2018 to 2022. Onn Hafiz is also the state chairman of UMNO of Johor since 2023 and the state chairman of Barisan Nasional (BN) of Johor since 2024.

Born in Simpang Renggam, Onn Hafiz graduated from University of Hertfordshire with a bachelor's degree in accounting. From March 2020 to his promotion to become Menteri Besar in March 2022, he served as Member of the Johor State Executive Council (EXCO) in the Barisan Nasional (BN) state administration under former Menteri Besar Hasni Mohammad. He is a member and the Division Chief of Simpang Renggam of the United Malays National Organisation (UMNO), a component party of the BN coalition.

== Early life, family and education ==
Onn Hafiz was born on 2 March 1979 in Simpang Renggam, Kluang, Johor, to Datin Roquaiya Hanim Hussein (1949–2006) and Dato' Ghazi Ishak (1943–2021), former prime minister Hussein Onn's eldest child. He comes from a family with a long political pedigree; he is the great-great-grandson of the first Menteri Besar of Johor, Jaafar Muhammad, great-grandson of the seventh Menteri Besar of Johor and first President of UMNO, Onn Jaafar, grandson of the third Prime Minister of Malaysia, Hussein Onn, and nephew of former Minister of Defence, Hishammuddin Hussein.

Onn Hafiz attended the Royal Military College in Sungai Besi, Kuala Lumpur. He received a Bachelor of Arts (BA) in Accounting from University of Hertfordshire.

== Political career ==
Onn Hafiz was an EXCO of the UMNO Youth in 2013-2018 under the leadership of Khairy Jamaluddin. In the 2018 election, he was chosen as the candidate for the Layang-Layang seat and won it with a small majority of only 364 against candidates from PKR and PAS. In the 2022 election, Onn Hafiz switched constituencies to Machap and won it with a majority of 6,543 against 3 candidates including a candidate from PEJUANG, Shahruddin Md Salleh.

On 15 March 2022, Onn Hafiz was officially sworn in as the new and 19th Menteri Besar of Johor, the 4th officeholder in just a single term of Parliament of Malaysia. Initially after the 2022 Johor state election, BN Chairman and UMNO President Ahmad Zahid Hamidi revealed that he would submit the name of his predecessor and caretaker Menteri Besar Hasni Mohammad to the Sultan of Johor for Hasni to be reappointed to the position after BN gained landslide victory in the election. BN previously also picked Hasni as its Menteri Besar candidate before BN returned to power. However a day before his appointment, Hasni suddenly announced his withdrawal from the running for the position and that he would pave way and endorse a younger candidate to lead the state government citing long term development for Johor and Onn Hafiz was instead appointed the next day.

On July 12, 2026, Onn Hafiz was sworn in for his second term as Menteri Besar after securing an expanded two-thirds majority during the 2026 Johor state election.

== Controversies and issues ==
=== 1MDB Scandal ===
In April 2019, Onn Hafiz was a witness in former prime minister Najib Razak’s corruption trial, which involved millions of ringgit linked to state fund 1Malaysia Development Berhad (1MDB). He testified to the Kuala Lumpur High Court that his company Vital Spire received a cheque for RM240,000 from Najib to launch the Malaysian Digest portal.

== Election results ==
Johor State Legislative Assembly
Year	Constituency	Candidate	Votes	Pct	Opponent(s)	Votes	Pct	Ballots cast	Majority	Turnout
2018	N27 Layang-Layang	Onn Hafiz Ghazi (UMNO)	7,449	46.93%	Murugan Muthu Samy (PKR)	7,085	44.63%	16,257	364	81.90%
2018	N27 Layang-Layang	Onn Hafiz Ghazi (UMNO)	7,449	46.93%	Mohd Jubri Selamat (PAS)	1,339	8.44%	16,257	364	81.90%
2022	N26 Machap	Onn Hafiz Ghazi (UMNO)	11,029	56.64%	Azlisham Azhar (PAS)	4,486	23.04%	19,473	6,543	57.67%
2022	N26 Machap	Onn Hafiz Ghazi (UMNO)	11,029	56.64%	Sangaran Rawisandran (MUDA)	3,493	17.94%	19,473	6,543	57.67%
2022	N26 Machap	Onn Hafiz Ghazi (UMNO)	11,029	56.64%	Shahruddin Md Salleh (PEJUANG)	465	2.39%	19,473	6,543	57.67%
2026	N26 Machap	Onn Hafiz Ghazi (UMNO)	20,382	80.28%	Nor Hafiz Roslan (AMANAH)	5,007	19.72%	25,389	15,375	72.12%

== Honours ==
- Malaysia
  - Recipient of the 17th Yang di-Pertuan Agong Installation Medal (2024)
- Federal Territory (Malaysia)
  - Commander of the Order of the Territorial Crown (PMW) – Datuk (2018)
- Johor
  - Grand Commander of the Order of Sultan Ibrahim of Johor (SMIJ) – Dato' (2023)

Political offices
Preceded by Hasni Mohammad	19th Menteri Besar of Johor; 2022 – present	Incumbent
