= 1982 Malaysian state elections =

State assembly elections were held in Malaysia on 22 April 1982 in all states except Sabah and Sarawak.

== Results ==
=== Johore ===
| Party or alliance | | Votes | % | Seats | +/– |
|---|---|---|---|---|---|
| Barisan Nasional | United Malays National Organisation | 177,981 | 38.83 | 20 | 0 |
| Barisan Nasional | Malaysian Chinese Association | 127,584 | 27.84 | 10 | 0 |
| Barisan Nasional | Parti Gerakan Rakyat Malaysia | 10,750 | 2.35 | 1 | +1 |
| Barisan Nasional | Malaysian Indian Congress | 9,045 | 1.97 | 1 | 0 |
| Barisan Nasional | Total | 325,360 | 70.99 | 32 | +1 |
| Democratic Action Party | | 82,968 | 18.10 | 0 | –1 |
| Parti Sosialis Rakyat Malaysia | | 27,437 | 5.99 | 0 | 0 |
| Pan-Malaysian Islamic Party | | 11,739 | 2.56 | 0 | 0 |
| Independents | | 10,838 | 2.36 | 4,723 | 0 |
| Total | | 458,342 | 100.00 | 4,755 | 0 |
| Valid votes | | 458,342 | 96.59 | | |
| Invalid/blank votes | | 16,176 | 3.41 | | |
| Total votes | | 474,518 | 100.00 | | |
| Registered voters/turnout | | 626,181 | 75.78 | | |
Source: Almanak Keputusan Pilihan Raya Umum: Parlimen & Dewan Undangan Negeri (1959-1999)

=== Kedah ===
| Party or alliance | | Votes | % | Seats | +/– |
|---|---|---|---|---|---|
| Barisan Nasional | United Malays National Organisation | 206,562 | 50.67 | 19 | +5 |
| Barisan Nasional | Malaysian Chinese Association | 22,845 | 5.60 | 3 | –1 |
| Barisan Nasional | Parti Gerakan Rakyat Malaysia | 17,620 | 4.32 | 1 | 0 |
| Barisan Nasional | Malaysian Indian Congress | 7,342 | 1.80 | 1 | +1 |
| Barisan Nasional | Total | 254,369 | 62.39 | 24 | +5 |
| Pan-Malaysian Islamic Party | | 134,957 | 33.10 | 2 | –5 |
| Democratic Action Party | | 17,352 | 4.26 | 0 | 0 |
| Independents | | 1,020 | 0.25 | 0 | 0 |
| Total | | 407,698 | 100.00 | 26 | 0 |
| Valid votes | | 407,698 | 98.06 | | |
| Invalid/blank votes | | 8,063 | 1.94 | | |
| Total votes | | 415,761 | 100.00 | | |
| Registered voters/turnout | | 541,924 | 76.72 | | |
Source: Almanak Keputusan Pilihan Raya Umum: Parlimen & Dewan Undangan Negeri (1959-1999)

=== Kelantan ===
| Party or alliance | | Votes | % | Seats | +/– |
|---|---|---|---|---|---|
| Barisan Nasional | United Malays National Organisation | 101,791 | 32.79 | 21 | –1 |
| Barisan Nasional | Pan-Malaysian Islamic Front | 49,074 | 15.81 | 4 | –7 |
| Barisan Nasional | Malaysian Chinese Association | 7,652 | 2.46 | 1 | 0 |
| Barisan Nasional | Total | 158,517 | 51.06 | 26 | –8 |
| Pan-Malaysian Islamic Party | | 144,789 | 46.64 | 10 | +8 |
| Democratic Action Party | | 1,121 | 0.36 | 0 | New |
| Independents | | 6,012 | 1.94 | 0 | 0 |
| Total | | 310,439 | 100.00 | 36 | 0 |
| Valid votes | | 310,439 | 98.16 | | |
| Invalid/blank votes | | 5,824 | 1.84 | | |
| Total votes | | 316,263 | 100.00 | | |
| Registered voters/turnout | | 394,127 | 80.24 | | |
Source: Almanak Keputusan Pilihan Raya Umum: Parlimen & Dewan Undangan Negeri (1959-1999)

=== Malacca ===
| Party or alliance | | Votes | % | Seats | +/– |
|---|---|---|---|---|---|
| Barisan Nasional | United Malays National Organisation | 58,645 | 41.85 | 13 | 0 |
| Barisan Nasional | Malaysian Chinese Association | 39,134 | 27.93 | 5 | +2 |
| Barisan Nasional | Total | 97,779 | 69.77 | 18 | +2 |
| Democratic Action Party | | 30,430 | 21.71 | 2 | –2 |
| Pan-Malaysian Islamic Party | | 10,795 | 7.70 | 0 | 0 |
| Independents | | 1,133 | 0.81 | 4,723 | – |
| Total | | 140,137 | 100.00 | 4,743 | 0 |
| Valid votes | | 140,137 | 97.60 | | |
| Invalid/blank votes | | 3,445 | 2.40 | | |
| Total votes | | 143,582 | 100.00 | | |
| Registered voters/turnout | | | – | | |
Source: Almanak Keputusan Pilihan Raya Umum: Parlimen & Dewan Undangan Negeri (1959-1999)

=== Negri Sembilan ===
| Party or alliance | | Votes | % | Seats | +/– |
|---|---|---|---|---|---|
| Barisan Nasional | United Malays National Organisation | 68,611 | 37.19 | 15 | 0 |
| Barisan Nasional | Malaysian Chinese Association | 49,015 | 26.57 | 6 | +1 |
| Barisan Nasional | Malaysian Indian Congress | 4,763 | 2.58 | 1 | 0 |
| Barisan Nasional | Total | 122,389 | 66.33 | 22 | +1 |
| Democratic Action Party | | 48,524 | 26.30 | 2 | –1 |
| Pan-Malaysian Islamic Party | | 8,759 | 4.75 | 0 | 0 |
| Malaysian Workers' Party | | 111 | 0.06 | 0 | 0 |
| Independents | | 4,723 | 2.56 | 0 | 0 |
| Total | | 184,506 | 100.00 | 24 | 0 |
| Valid votes | | 184,506 | 97.59 | | |
| Invalid/blank votes | | 4,550 | 2.41 | | |
| Total votes | | 189,056 | 100.00 | | |
| Registered voters/turnout | | 247,434 | 76.41 | | |
Source: Almanak Keputusan Pilihan Raya Umum: Parlimen & Dewan Undangan Negeri (1959-1999)

=== Pahang ===
| Party or alliance | | Votes | % | Seats | +/– |
|---|---|---|---|---|---|
| Barisan Nasional | United Malays National Organisation | 122,420 | 51.96 | 24 | 0 |
| Barisan Nasional | Malaysian Chinese Association | 16,207 | 6.88 | 5 | 0 |
| Barisan Nasional | Parti Gerakan Rakyat Malaysia | 4,396 | 1.87 | 1 | 0 |
| Barisan Nasional | Malaysian Indian Congress | 3,432 | 1.46 | 1 | 0 |
| Barisan Nasional | Total | 146,455 | 62.16 | 31 | 0 |
| Pan-Malaysian Islamic Party | | 45,705 | 19.40 | 0 | 0 |
| Democratic Action Party | | 31,036 | 13.17 | 1 | +1 |
| Parti Sosialis Rakyat Malaysia | | 1,883 | 0.80 | 0 | 0 |
| Independents | | 10,515 | 4.46 | 0 | 0 |
| Total | | 235,594 | 100.00 | 32 | 0 |
| Valid votes | | 235,594 | 97.16 | | |
| Invalid/blank votes | | 6,890 | 2.84 | | |
| Total votes | | 242,484 | 100.00 | | |
| Registered voters/turnout | | 325,831 | 74.42 | | |
Source: Almanak Keputusan Pilihan Raya Umum: Parlimen & Dewan Undangan Negeri (1959-1999)

=== Penang ===
| Party or alliance | | Votes | % | Seats | +/– |
|---|---|---|---|---|---|
| Barisan Nasional | Parti Gerakan Rakyat Malaysia | 80,571 | 23.22 | 8 | 0 |
| Barisan Nasional | United Malays National Organisation | 60,831 | 17.53 | 10 | +1 |
| Barisan Nasional | Malaysian Chinese Association | 57,304 | 16.51 | 6 | +4 |
| Barisan Nasional | Malaysian Indian Congress | 7,199 | 2.07 | 1 | 0 |
| Barisan Nasional | Total | 205,905 | 59.34 | 25 | +5 |
| Democratic Action Party | | 92,023 | 26.52 | 2 | –3 |
| Pan-Malaysian Islamic Party | | 24,410 | 7.03 | 0 | –1 |
| Parti Sosialis Rakyat Malaysia | | 12,499 | 3.60 | 0 | 0 |
| Social Democratic Party | | 827 | 0.24 | 0 | 0 |
| Kesatuan Insaf Tanah Air | | 93 | 0.03 | 0 | 0 |
| Independents | | 11,258 | 3.24 | 0 | -1 |
| Total | | 347,015 | 100.00 | 27 | 0 |
| Valid votes | | 347,015 | 97.82 | | |
| Invalid/blank votes | | 7,750 | 2.18 | | |
| Total votes | | 354,765 | 100.00 | | |
| Registered voters/turnout | | 460,387 | 77.06 | | |
Source: Almanak Keputusan Pilihan Raya Umum: Parlimen & Dewan Undangan Negeri (1959-1999)

=== Perak ===
| Party or alliance | | Votes | % | Seats | +/– |
|---|---|---|---|---|---|
| Barisan Nasional | United Malays National Organisation | 165,514 | 27.99 | 24 | +1 |
| Barisan Nasional | Malaysian Chinese Association | 126,921 | 21.46 | 10 | +6 |
| Barisan Nasional | Parti Gerakan Rakyat Malaysia | 36,973 | 6.25 | 3 | +1 |
| Barisan Nasional | People's Progressive Party | 18,519 | 3.13 | 0 | –2 |
| Barisan Nasional | Malaysian Indian Congress | 9,005 | 1.52 | 1 | 0 |
| Barisan Nasional | Total | 356,932 | 60.35 | 38 | +6 |
| Democratic Action Party | | 156,267 | 26.42 | 4 | –5 |
| Pan-Malaysian Islamic Party | | 67,113 | 11.35 | 0 | –1 |
| Malaysian Social Justice Party | | 293 | 0.05 | 0 | 0 |
| Independents | | 10,807 | 1.83 | 0 | 0 |
| Total | | 591,412 | 100.00 | 42 | 0 |
| Valid votes | | 591,412 | 97.30 | | |
| Invalid/blank votes | | 16,438 | 2.70 | | |
| Total votes | | 607,850 | 100.00 | | |
| Registered voters/turnout | | 818,933 | 74.22 | | |
Source: Almanak Keputusan Pilihan Raya Umum: Parlimen & Dewan Undangan Negeri (1959-1999)

=== Perlis ===
| Party or alliance | | Votes | % | Seats | +/– |
|---|---|---|---|---|---|
| Barisan Nasional | United Malays National Organisation | 27,041 | 50.06 | 9 | –1 |
| Barisan Nasional | Malaysian Chinese Association | 6,609 | 12.24 | 2 | 0 |
| Barisan Nasional | Total | 33,650 | 62.30 | 11 | –1 |
| Pan-Malaysian Islamic Party | | 18,910 | 35.01 | 1 | +1 |
| Democratic Action Party | | 773 | 1.43 | 0 | 0 |
| Independents | | 683 | 1.26 | 0 | 0 |
| Total | | 54,016 | 100.00 | 12 | 0 |
| Valid votes | | 54,016 | 97.23 | | |
| Invalid/blank votes | | 1,539 | 2.77 | | |
| Total votes | | 55,555 | 100.00 | | |
| Registered voters/turnout | | 72,520 | 76.61 | | |
Source: Almanak Keputusan Pilihan Raya Umum: Parlimen & Dewan Undangan Negeri (1959-1999)

=== Selangor ===
| Party or alliance | | Votes | % | Seats | +/– |
|---|---|---|---|---|---|
| Barisan Nasional | United Malays National Organisation | 172,021 | 38.26 | 20 | 0 |
| Barisan Nasional | Malaysian Chinese Association | 76,277 | 16.97 | 7 | +2 |
| Barisan Nasional | Malaysian Indian Congress | 37,531 | 8.35 | 3 | 0 |
| Barisan Nasional | Parti Gerakan Rakyat Malaysia | 21,961 | 4.88 | 1 | 0 |
| Barisan Nasional | Total | 307,790 | 68.46 | 31 | +2 |
| Democratic Action Party | | 89,648 | 19.94 | 1 | –2 |
| Pan-Malaysian Islamic Party | | 37,251 | 8.29 | 0 | 0 |
| Independents | | 14,920 | 3.32 | 1 | 0 |
| Total | | 449,609 | 100.00 | 33 | 0 |
| Valid votes | | 449,609 | 97.30 | | |
| Invalid/blank votes | | 12,490 | 2.70 | | |
| Total votes | | 462,099 | 100.00 | | |
| Registered voters/turnout | | 633,861 | 72.90 | | |
Source: Almanak Keputusan Pilihan Raya Umum: Parlimen & Dewan Undangan Negeri (1959-1999)

=== Trengganu ===
| Party or alliance | | Votes | % | Seats | +/– |
|---|---|---|---|---|---|
| Barisan Nasional | United Malays National Organisation | 102,471 | 54.51 | 22 | –5 |
| Barisan Nasional | Malaysian Chinese Association | 4,064 | 2.16 | 1 | 0 |
| Barisan Nasional | Total | 106,535 | 56.67 | 23 | –5 |
| Pan-Malaysian Islamic Party | | 76,865 | 40.89 | 5 | +5 |
| Parti Sosialis Rakyat Malaysia | | 1,181 | 0.63 | 0 | 0 |
| Independents | | 3,410 | 1.81 | 0 | 0 |
| Total | | 187,991 | 100.00 | 28 | 0 |
| Valid votes | | 187,991 | 97.26 | | |
| Invalid/blank votes | | 5,291 | 2.74 | | |
| Total votes | | 193,282 | 100.00 | | |
| Registered voters/turnout | | 242,092 | 79.84 | | |
Source: Almanak Keputusan Pilihan Raya Umum: Parlimen & Dewan Undangan Negeri (1959-1999)
