= Order of the Crown of Johor =

Order of chivalry awarded by the Sultan of Johor

The Most Honourable Order of the Crown of Johor Darjah Mahkota Johor Yang Amat Mulia

Awarded by the Sultan of Johor
- Type: Order
- Status: Currently constituted
- Sovereign: Ibrahim Ismail of Johor
- Grades: Grand Commander; Commander; Companion
- Post-nominals: S.P.M.J.; D.P.M.J.; S.M.J.

Precedence
- Next (higher): Royal Family Order of Johor
- Next (lower): Order of Loyalty of Sultan Ismail of Johor; Order of Sultan Ibrahim of Johor
- Ribbon bar of the order

The Most Honourable Order of the Crown of Johor (Malay: Darjah Mahkota Johor Yang Amat Mulia) is an Order of chivalry awarded by the Sultan of Johor. It was first instituted on July 31, 1886.

It is awarded in three classes:

- Grand Commander (Dato' Sri Paduka-S.P.M.J.),
- Commander (Dato' Paduka-D.P.M.J.) and
- Companion (Setia-S.M.J.).

Male recipients of these royal awards, the Dato' Sri Paduka Mahkota Johor (SPMJ) and the Dato' Paduka Mahkota Johor (DPMJ) are entitled to be addressed with the honorary title “Dato” (equivalent to ‘Sir’) and their female spouse “Datin” (equivalent to ‘Lady’). Female recipients are given the honorary title Datin Paduka (equivalent to 'Dame') but there is no accompanying title for their male spouse.

The Order of the Crown of Johor is the oldest royal order in the country, introduced some 30 years before any of the other Malaysian royal households introduced a similar order. The awards are bestowed based on three main criteria namely; loyalty, meticulous service and diligence. Since these royal awards were first conferred in 1886, only 712 individuals have been honoured, an average of only five honours per year making it reputedly the rarest and hence most prestigious ‘Datoship’ (or knighthood) to get in Malaysia. Awards are conferred at the sultan's discretion, in conjunction with the birthday of the Sultan of Johor. The annual Honours List is published in most mainstream Malaysian media and newspapers.

== Recipients ==
=== Grand Commander (S.P.M.J) ===
- Franz Ferdinand
- Jaafar Haji Muhammad
- S. Q. Wong
- Lee Kong Chian
- Abdul Rahman Andak
- Abdul Rahman Mohamed Yassin (1941)
- Hassan Yunus (1959)
- Mohamed Noah Omar (1960)
- Suleiman Abdul Rahman (1960)
- Abdul Razak Hussein (1961)
- Ismail Abdul Rahman (1965)
- Aw Cheng Chye (1968)
- Hussein Onn
- Mustapha Harun (1970)
- Sulaiman Ninam Shah (1970)
- Sardon Jubir (1972)
- Abdul Kadir Yusuf (1973)
- Mohamed Rahmat (1975)
- Awang Hassan (1977)
- Mahathir Mohamad (1979)
- Lee Kuan Yew (1984)
- Edmund W. Barker (1984)
- Jaffar Hussein (1986)
- Leonardus Benyamin Moerdani (1986)
- Try Sutrisno
- Tan Hiok Nee
- Toh Ah Boon
- Abdul Rahman Ya'kub
- Abdul Taib Mahmud
- Ibrahim Ismail
- Syed Nasir Ismail
- Musa Hitam
- Samy Vellu
- Goh Chok Tong (1991)
- Tan Hong Chiang (1973)
- Muhyiddin Yassin (1991)
- Syed Hamid Albar
- Abdul Ghani Othman (2004)
- Ali Hamsa (2013)
- Noorainee Abdul Rahman (2013)
- Mohamed Khaled Nordin (2013)
- Osman Sapian (2018)
- Hasni Mohammad (2021)
- Lee Hsien Loong (2022)

=== Commander (D.P.M.J) ===
- Onn Jaafar (1940)
- Tan Cheng Lock (1949)
- S. Q. Wong
- Lee Kong Chian
- Aw Cheng Chye (1963)
- Toh Ah Boon
- Syed Jaafar Albar
- T. Sachithanandan
- Hishammuddin Hussein
- Zeti Akhtar Aziz
- Wan Mokhtar Wan Ahmad
- Abdul Rahim Thamby Chik
- Shake (singer)
- Tan Hong Chiang
- Krishna Kumar Sharma

=== Companion (S.M.J.) ===
- Wong Ah Fook
- Lim Ah Siang
- Abdul Ghani Othman
- Muhyiddin Yassin
- Sharifah Aini

== See also ==
- Orders, decorations, and medals of the Malaysian states and federal territories#Johor
- Orders, decorations, and medals of Johor
- Order of precedence in Johor
- List of post-nominal letters (Johor)
