= Royal Family Order of Johor =

Chivalrous order awarded by the Sultan of Johor

The Most Esteemed Royal Family Order of Johor Darjah Kerabat Johor Yang Amat Dihormati

Awarded by the Sultan of Johor
- Type: Order
- Established: 31 July 1886
- Royal house: House of Temenggong
- Status: Currently constituted
- Sovereign: Ibrahim Ismail of Johor
- Grades: First Class; Second Class
- Post-nominals: D.K. I; D.K. II

Precedence
- Next (higher): None
- Next (lower): Order of the Crown of Johor
- Ribbon bar of the order

The Most Esteemed Royal Family Order of Johor (Bahasa Melayu: Darjah Kerabat Johor Yang Amat Dihormati), is a chivalrous order awarded by the Sultan of Johor.

== History ==
It was first instituted by Sultan Abu Bakar of Johor on 31 July 1886.

== Classes ==
It is awarded in two classes:

- First Class - Darjah Kerabat Johor Pangkat Pertama (DK I)
- Second Class - Darjah Kerabat Johor Pangkat Kedua (DK II)

Ribbon bars
First Class	Second Class

- First Class - Darjah Kerabat Johor Pangkat Pertama (DK I)

Is awarded to members of the Royal Family of Johor and the other Royal Rulers and Consorts or other members to other Royal Families that have done immensely to the servititude to the Sultan and the Family.

It is awarded as a set of a nine rayed breast star, a collar with a lesser star, a yellow silk sash, worn from the right shoulder to the left waist and a lesser star for the sash.

- Second Class - Darjah Kerabat Johor Pangkat Kedua (DK II)

It is awarded to junior members of the Royal Families like the Pengirans, Tunkus, Tengkus, Rajas and Syeds.

It is awarded as a set of a seven rayed breast star with a neck ribbon with a lesser star suspended on it.

== Notable recipients ==
#	Name	Year	Awards
1	Archduke Franz Ferdinand of Austria	1893	DK I
2	Prince Henry of Prussia	1898	DK I
3	Dato' Jaafar Haji Muhammad	1903	DK I
4	Dato' Sri Amar DiRaja Abdul Rahman Andak	1903	DK II
5	Emperor Bảo Đại	1933	DK I
6	Dato' Sir Onn Jaafar	1947	DK II
7	Sultan Omar Ali Saifuddien Sa'adul Khairi Waddien	1960	DK I
8	Tunku Abdul Rahman	1961	DK I
9	Sultan Hassanal Bolkiah Mu'izzaddin Waddaulah	1969	DK I
10	Tunku Puan Zanariah Tengku Ahmad	1972	DK I
11	Sultan Haji Ahmad Shah Al-Musta’in Billah	1975	DK I
12	Tun Hussein Onn	1976	DK I
13	Tunku Puan Nora Tengku Ahmad	1978	DK I
14	Sultan Abdul Halim Mu'adzam Shah	1983	DK I
15	Sultan Mahmud	1986	DK I
16	Sultanah Bahiyah Tuanku Abdul Rahman	1989	DK I
17	Tun Dr. Mahathir Mohamad	1989	DK I
18	Soeharto	1990	DK I
19	Pengiran Isteri Mariam	1997	DK I
20	Raja Perempuan Tengku Anis	2000	DK I
21	Tan Sri Dr. Zeti Akhtar Aziz	2000	DK II
22	Tun Abdullah Ahmad Badawi	2004	DK I
23	Tun Abdul Taib Mahmud	2007	DK I
24	Tunku Ismail Sultan Ibrahim	2009	DK I
25	Tan Sri Abdul Ghani Othman	2009	DK I
26	Sultan Muhammad V	2011	DK I
27	Sultan Sallehuddin Sultan Badlishah	2017	DK I
28	Hamad bin Isa Al Khalifa	2017	DK I
29	Sultan Nazrin Muizzuddin Shah	2019	DK I
30	Che' Puan Khaleeda Bustamam	2019	DK I
31	Pengiran Muda Mahkota Al-Muhtadee Billah	2023	DK I
32	Al-Sultan Abdullah Ri'ayatuddin Al-Mustafa Billah Shah	2023	DK I
33	Tunku Azizah Aminah Maimunah Iskandariah	2023	DK I
34	Prabowo Subianto	2025	DK I
35	Tunku Iskandar Abdul Jalil Abu Bakar Ibrahim	2026	DK I

== See also ==
- Orders, decorations, and medals of the Malaysian states and federal territories#Johor
- Order of precedence in Johor
- List of post-nominal letters (Johor)
