= Onn Jaafar =

Malayan politician (1895–1962)

Yang Berhormat Dato' Sir Onn Jaafar DK II (Johor) SPCM DPMJ KBE
- عون جعفر
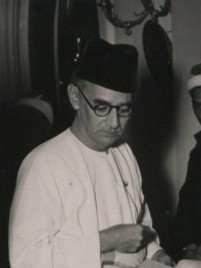
- Onn Jaafar, 1948.

7th Menteri Besar of Johor
- In office 1 June 1947 – 18 May 1950
- Preceded by: Ungku Abdul Aziz Abdul Majid
- Succeeded by: Syed Abdul Kadir Mohamed

1st President of the United Malays National Organisation
- In office 11 May 1946 – 25 August 1951
- Preceded by: Position established
- Succeeded by: Tunku Abdul Rahman

1st President of Independence of Malaya Party
- In office 16 September 1951 – 16 March 1954
- Preceded by: Position established
- Succeeded by: Position abolished

2nd President of Parti Negara
- In office 10 December 1955 – 19 January 1962
- Preceded by: Hamzah Abdullah
- Succeeded by: Baba Ludek

Member of the Malaysian Parliament for Kuala Terengganu Selatan
- In office 11 September 1959 – 19 January 1962
- Preceded by: Constituency established
- Succeeded by: Ismail Kassim
- Majority: 2,612 (1959)

Personal details
- Born: Onn bin Jaafar; 12 February 1895 Bukit Gambir, Johor Bahru, Johor
- Died: 19 January 1962 (aged 66) Johor Bahru, Johor, Federation of Malaya (now Malaysia)
- Resting place: Mahmoodiah Royal Mausoleum
- Party: United Malays National Organisation (1946–1951); Independence of Malaya Party (1951–1953); National Party (1954–1962)
- Spouses: Rafeah Abdullah; Jamilah Osman; Che Kah; Datin Halimah Hussein, Lady Onn
- Relations: Onn Hafiz Ghazi (great-grandson); Hishammuddin Hussein (grandson); Abdul Rahman Mohamed Yassin (brother-in-law); Ungku Abdul Aziz (nephew); Syed Hussein Alatas (nephew); Syed Muhammad Naquib al-Attas (nephew)
- Children: Hussein Onn
- Parents: Jaafar Muhammad; Roquaiya Hanim

Onn bin Dato' Jaafar (Jawi: عون بن جعفر; 12 February 1895 – 19 January 1962) was a Malayan politician who served as the 7th Menteri Besar of Johor from 1947 to 1950. His organised opposition towards the creation of the Malayan Union (by the returning British colonial power after the end of the Japanese occupation of Malaya) led him to form the United Malays National Organisation (UMNO) in 1946; he was UMNO's founder and its first president until his resignation in 1951. He was famously known as the pioneer of organised anti-imperialism and early Malay nationalism within Malaya, which eventually culminated with the Malayan independence from Britain. He was also responsible for the social and economic welfare of the Malays by setting up the Rural Industrial Development Authority (RIDA).

== Early years ==
Onn's father was Jaafar Muhammad, the former Chief Minister of Johor. His mother was Roquaiya Hanim (also spelled Rogayah Hanim or Rukiye Hanım; 1864–1904), who came from the Caucasus region of the Ottoman Empire, and was either of Circassian or Georgian origin. She was likely presented as a concubine by the Ottoman court to the Sultan of Johor. His mother was married three times and the last time was with his father. As Onn Jaafar's family had close relations with the Johor palace, Sultan Ibrahim treated him as an adopted son. He started his education in a Malay school in Johor Bahru. In 1904, he went to England to attend Aldeburgh Lodge School, a private school in Suffolk, with the then Tunku Mahkota of Johor until 1910. He excelled in sports and captained the school's cricket and football teams.

He returned to Malaya and was enrolled at the Malay College Kuala Kangsar (MCKK) where he studied there for two years from 1910 to 1911. According to biographer Ramlah Adam, one of the main reasons for him to enroll at MCKK was the need to improve his Malay language proficiency that had weakened considerably following his time in England.

After graduating from MCKK, he worked as a trainee clerk at the Johor Government Secretary office and was made a permanent clerk a year later. He served in this capacity in several departments before joining the Johor Military Forces in 1917 with the rank of lieutenant. Two years later, he rejoined the civil service. Soon after, he found himself in trouble with the Johor palace after expressing his unhappiness over the sale of his family's ancestral home. The royal palace did not take the issue kindly and terminated his service in June 1920. He rejoined the service again in 1921 as an Assistant Collector of Land Revenue.

== Malay nationalism and politics ==
Early Malay nationalism took root in Johor during the 1920s, he became a journalist and wrote articles on the welfare of the Malays. Some of Onn's articles were critical of Sultan Ibrahim's policies, which led to strained personal relations with the Sultan. In 1927, Sultan Ibrahim expelled Onn from Johor after he published an article in the Sunday Mirror, a Singapore-based English tabloid, which criticised the Sultan's poor treatment of the Johor Military Forces personnel and the welfare of the Orang Asli. He went into exile in Singapore and became the editor of a Malay paper, Warta Malaya, in 1930. Over the next six years, he edited four other newspapers including the Lembaga Malaya, Warta Ahad and Lembaga. Onn became very popular after he continued to cover issues on Malay grievances, and Sultan Ibrahim invited Onn to return to Johor in 1936.

In 1941, following the Japanese occupation of Malaya, Onn was drafted into the administrative system and served as a food controller in Johor.

Onn, along with his companions, Haji Anwar bin Abdul Malik, Haji Syed Alwi bin Syed Sheikh al-Hadi and Mohamed Noah Omar, founded the United Malays National Organisation (UMNO) as a means to rally the Malays against the Malayan Union, which was perceived as threatening Malay privileges and the position of the Malay rulers. Onn took up the role of UMNO's president on 1 May 1946.

=== Malayan Union ===
The Malayan Union proposal provided that United Kingdom had full administrative powers over the Malay states except in areas pertaining spiritual and moral authority of the Malay rulers, which the Malays held in high esteem. Communal tensions between the Malays and Chinese were high, and the prospect of granting citizenship to non-Malays was deemed unacceptable to the Malays. In particular, politicians in Johor were extremely unhappy with the willingness of Sultan Ibrahim to sign the treaties with Harold MacMichael, and voiced out that the Sultan had violated the terms in the Johor State Constitution which explicitly forbade any foreign powers to assume legitimate control over the state. Prior to February 1946, seven political dissidents led by Awang bin Hassan organised a rally to protest against the Sultan's decision to sign the treaties, and Onn Jaafar, who was then serving as a district officer in Batu Pahat, was invited to attend the rally. The rally was held on 1 February 1946 at the Sultan Abu Bakar State Mosque, and protesters shouted nationalistic slogans and called for the dethronement of Sultan Ibrahim and accused him for committing treason against the Malay race by signing the treaties.

News of the rally reached Sultan Ibrahim on 22 February, who was then residing at Grosvenor House Hotel in London. Sultan Ibrahim approached the colonial office and withdrew his support of the proposal, but this did not appease the political dissidents and Onn continued to organise more rallies in the other Malay states to muster further support for his calls against the Malayan Union, and formed the United Malays National Organisation (UMNO) in May.

To appease the Malays and the UMNO leaders, including Onn himself, Sultan Ibrahim personally donated a lump sum of $5,000 to UMNO and Onn was appointed the Menteri Besar of Johor in 1946.

The establishment of the Federation of Malaya did not go down well with the ethnic Chinese, as favourable conditions for obtaining citizenship for the Chinese and other non-Malays were withdrawn. The Malaysian Chinese Association (MCA) was formed in 1949 under the leadership of a Straits Chinese businessman, Tan Cheng Lock who frequently raised grievances over the citizenship terms that were set when the Federation was established. As a result, communal tensions between the Malays and Chinese surfaced, and Onn kept his distance from Tan. Tan encountered initial difficulties with meeting Sultan Ibrahim, who was not accustomed to working with Chinese businessmen.

Sultan Ibrahim also became increasingly disappointed in Onn's work commitment, whom he saw as neglecting state affairs as a result of his commitments towards UMNO. In early 1950, Sultan Ibrahim approached Onn, who was asked to choose between committing his efforts for UMNO and the state. Onn chose to the former, and resigned as the Menteri Besar of Johor in May.

=== Leaving UMNO ===
Onn became increasingly disillusioned and disgusted with what he considered to be UMNO's race-based communalist policies, and called for party membership to be opened to all Malayans of all races, and for UMNO to be renamed as the United Malayans National Organisation. He left the party on 26 August 1951 after his recommendations went unheeded, and formed the Independence of Malaya Party (IMP). However, the IMP failed to receive sufficient backing from Malayans, and eventually Onn left it to form the Parti Negara, which placed membership restrictions on non-Malays in an attempt to appeal to Malays. He won the Kuala Terengganu Selatan seat in the Malayan parliament in the 1959 elections under his new party.

Neither party gained popular support against Tunku Abdul Rahman's new Alliance coalition and he was eventually eclipsed in Malayan political life.

== Election results ==
Parliament of Federation of Malaya
Year	Constituency	Candidate	Votes	Pct	Opponent(s)	Votes	Pct	Ballots cast	Majority	Turnout
1959	P027 Kuala Trengganu Selatan	Onn Jaafar (Negara)	7,986	59.78%	Engku Muhsein Abdul Kadir (UMNO)	5,374	40.22%	13,360	2,612	70,09%

== Death ==
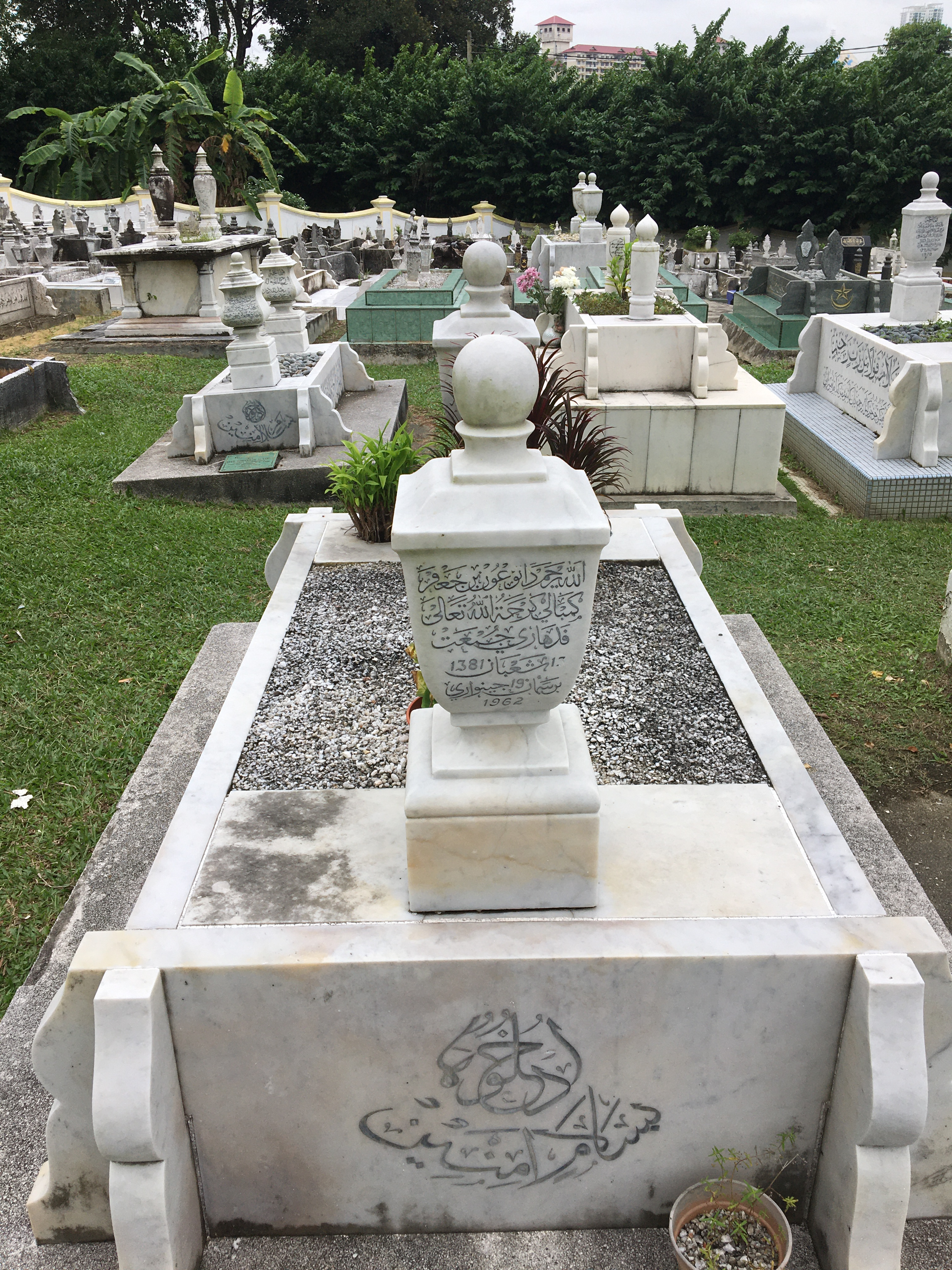
Dato' Onn's tomb at the Mahmoodiah Royal Mausoleum, Johor Bahru.

Dato' Onn died at the age of 66, on 19 January 1962 at the Officers' Ward, General Hospital, Johor Bahru. He was buried next to his father Jaafar Muhammad's grave, at the Mahmoodiah Royal Mausoleum in Johor Bahru.

== Family ==
His son Hussein Onn later became the third prime minister of Malaysia, his grandson, Hishammuddin Hussein is a senior UMNO politician, and his great-grandson Onn Hafiz Ghazi is the Johor State Chairman of UMNO who is serving as a member of the Johor State Legislative Assembly for Layang-Layang and as 19th menteri besar of Johor.

== Awards and recognitions ==
=== Places named after him ===
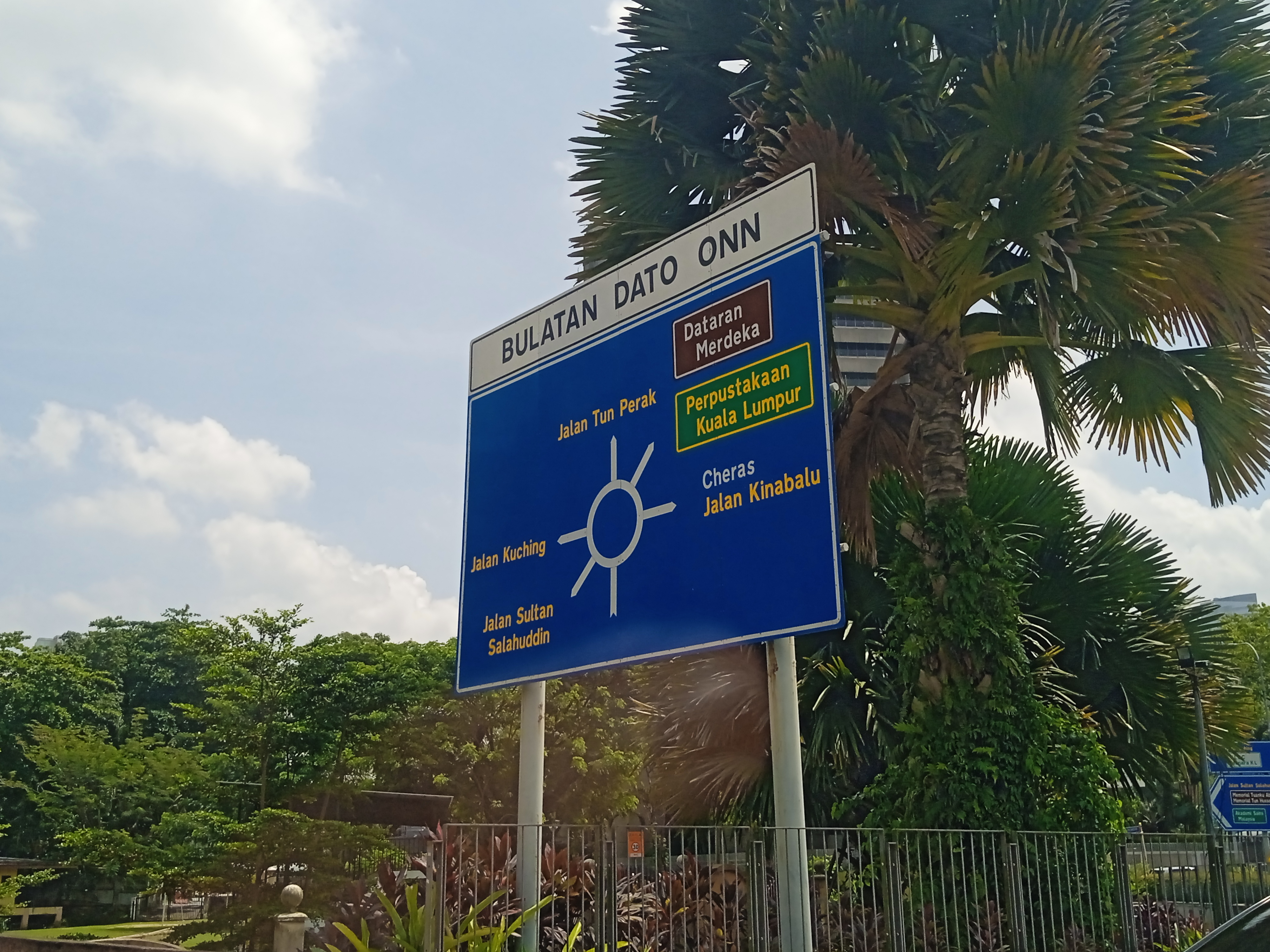
Bulatan Dato Onn roundabout sign along Jalan Parlimen in Kuala Lumpur, Malaysia

- Bandar Dato' Onn, a suburb developed by the Johor Land Berhad in Johor Bahru, Johor
- Bulatan Dato Onn, a small roundabout located next to the Bank Negara Malaysia headquarters
- Jalan Dato Onn, a street in Kuala Lumpur and was previously known as Jalan Brockman or Brockman Road
- Menara Dato' Onn, the UMNO general headquarters in Kuala Lumpur
- Kolej Dato' Onn, a residential college at National University of Malaysia, Bangi, Selangor
- Kolej Dato' Onn Jaafar, a residential college at Universiti Teknologi Malaysia, Skudai, Johor
- Kolej Dato' Onn, a residential college at Universiti Teknologi MARA, Machang, Kelantan
- SK Dato' Onn Jaafar, One of the component schools within the Sekolah Wawasan in Subang Jaya.
- Kampung Dato' Onn, a residential area within the suburb of Larkin, Johor.

== Honours ==
=== Honours of Malaysia ===
- Johor
  - Second Class of the Royal Family Order of Johor (DK II) (1947)
  - Knight Commander of the Order of the Crown of Johor (DPMJ) – Dato' (1941)
- Perak
  - Knight Grand Commander of the Order of Cura Si Manja Kini (SPCM) – Dato' Seri (2015)

=== Foreign honours ===
- United Kingdom
  - Honorary Knight Commander of the Order of the British Empire (KBE) – Sir (1953)

== In popular culture ==
- Portrayed by Zaefrul Nordin in the 2007 film 1957: Hati Malaya directed by Shuhaimi Baba.
