= Menteri Besar of Johor =

Head of government

Menteri Besar of the State of Johor Darul Ta'zim
- Flag of Menteri Besar of Johor

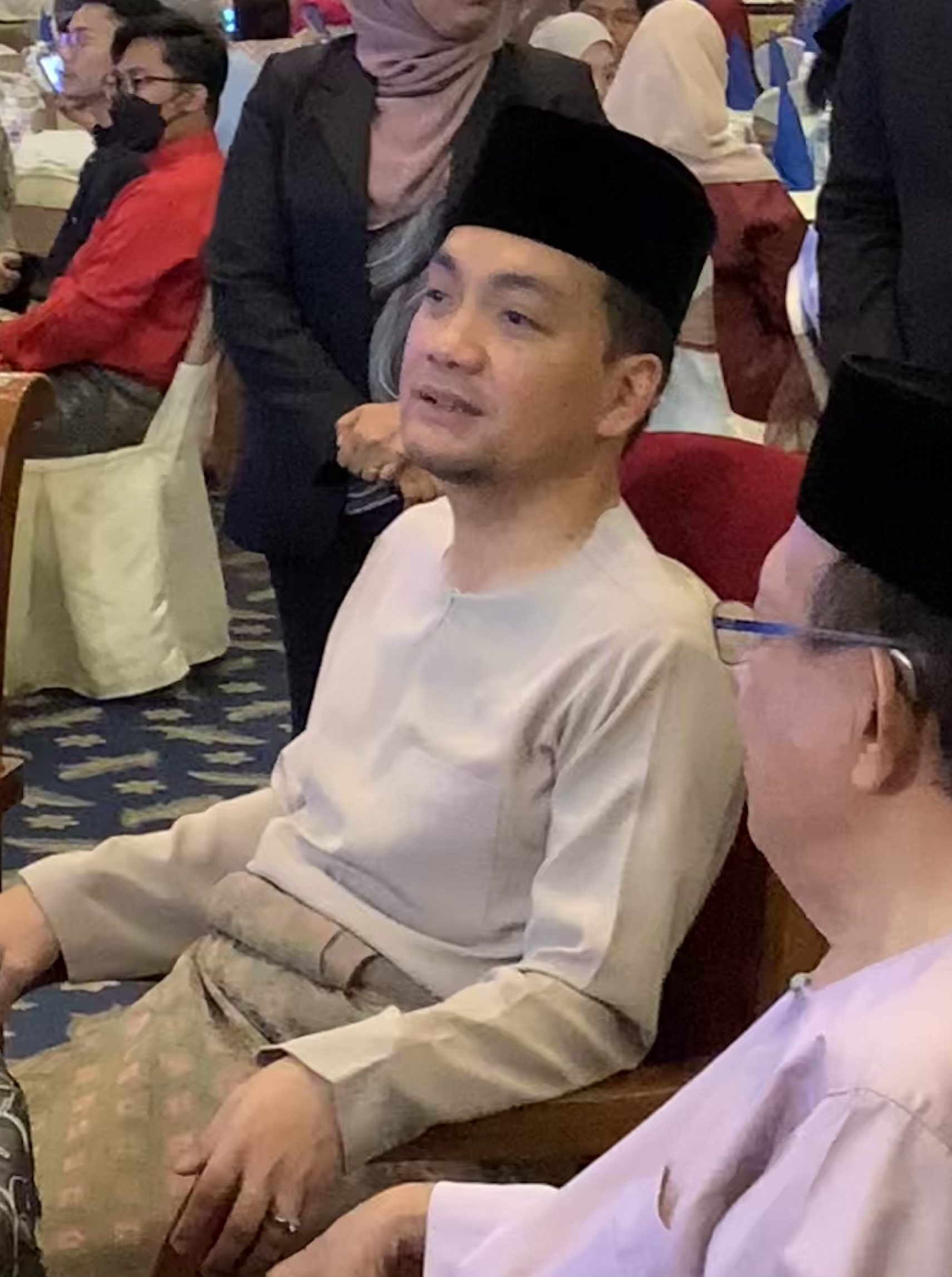
- Incumbent; Dato' Onn Hafiz Ghazi since 15 March 2022
- Government of Johor
- Style: English: The Right Honourable; Malay: Yang Amat Berhormat
- Member of: Johor State Executive Council
- Reports to: Johor State Legislative Assembly
- Residence: Saujana, Johor Bahru, Johor
- Seat: Bangunan Dato' Jaafar Muhammad, Kota Iskandar, 79000 Iskandar Puteri, Johor Bahru, Johor
- Appointer: Ibrahim Ismail; as Sultan of Johor
- Term length: 5 years or less, renewable once (while commanding the confidence of the Johor State Legislative Assembly With State Elections held no more than five years apart)
- Inaugural holder: Jaafar Muhammad
- Formation: 1886; 140 years ago
- Website: www.johor.gov.my/kerajaan/info-kerajaan/menteri-besar

The Menteri Besar of the State of Johor or Chief Minister of the State of Johor is the head of government in the Malaysian state of Johor. According to convention, the Menteri Besar is the leader of the majority party or largest coalition party of the Johor State Legislative Assembly.

The 19th and current Menteri Besar of Johor is Onn Hafiz Ghazi, who took on office since 15 March 2022.

== Appointment ==
According to the state constitution, the Sultan of Johor shall first appoint the Menteri Besar to preside over the Executive Council and requires such Menteri Besar to be a member of the Legislative Assembly who in His Majesty's judgement is likely to command the confidence of the majority of the members of the Assembly, must be an ethnic Malay who professes the religion of Islam and must not a Malaysian citizen by naturalisation or by registration. The Sultan on the Menteri Besar's advice shall appoint not more than ten nor less than four members from among the members of the Legislative Assembly.

The member of the Executive Council must take and subscribe in the presence of the Sultan the oath of office and allegiance as well as the oath of secrecy before they can exercise the functions of office. The Executive Council shall be collectively responsible to the Legislative Assembly. The members of the Executive Council shall not hold any office of profit and engage in any trade, business or profession that will cause conflict of interest.

If a government cannot get its appropriation (budget) legislation passed by the Legislative Assembly, or the Legislative Assembly passes a vote of "no confidence" in the government, the Menteri Besar is bound by convention to resign immediately. The Sultan's choice of replacement on Menteri Besar will be dictated by the circumstances. A member of the Executive Council other than the Menteri Besar shall hold office during the pleasure of the Sultan, unless the appointment of any member of the Executive Council shall have been revoked by the Sultan on the advice of the Menteri Besar but may at any time resign his office.

Following a resignation in other circumstances, defeated in an election or the death of the Menteri Besar, the Sultan will generally appoint as Menteri Besar the person voted by the governing party as their new leader.

== Powers ==
The power of the Menteri Besar is subject to a number of limitations. Menteri Besar removed as leader of his or her party, or whose government loses a vote of no confidence in the Legislative Assembly, must advise a state election or resign the office or be dismissed by the Sultan. The defeat of a supply bill (one that concerns the spending of money) or unable to pass important policy-related legislation is seen to require the resignation of the government or dissolution of Legislative Assembly, much like a non-confidence vote, since a government that cannot spend money is hamstrung, also called loss of supply.

The Menteri Besar's party will normally have a majority in the Legislative Assembly and party discipline is exceptionally strong in Johor politics, so passage of the government's legislation through the Legislative Assembly is mostly a formality.

== Caretaker Menteri Besar ==
The legislative assembly unless sooner dissolved by the Sultan with His Majesty's own discretion on the advice of the Menteri Besar shall continue for five years from the date of its first meeting. The state constitution permits a delay of 60 days of general election to be held from the date of dissolution and the legislative assembly shall be summoned to meet on a date not later than 120 days from the date of dissolution. Conventionally, between the dissolution of one legislative assembly and the convening of the next, the Menteri Besar and the executive council remain in office in a caretaker capacity.

== List of Menteris Besar of Johor ==
The following is the list of Menteris Besar of Johor since 1886:

Colour key (for political parties):
Independent UMNO Alliance Party Barisan Nasional Pakatan Harapan

No.	Portrait	Name (Birth–Death) Constituency	Term of office			Party (Note: This column names only the Menteri Besar's party. The state government he heads may be a complex coalition of several parties and independents; those are not listed here.)	Election	Assembly
No.	Portrait	Name (Birth–Death) Constituency	Took office	Left office	Time in office	Party	Election	Assembly
1		Dato'; Jaafar Muhammad (1838–1919)	1886	3 July 1920		None	–	–
Vacant (3 July 1919 – 16 July 1920)
2		Dato'; Mohamed Mahbob (1852–1923)	16 July 1920	1 September 1922	2 years, 48 days	None	–	–
Vacant (1 September 1922 – September 1923)
3		Dato'; Abdullah Jaafar (1875–1934)	September; 1923	16 September 1928		None	–	–
4		Dato'; Mustapha Jaafar (1862–1946)	16 September 1928	23 November 1931	3 years, 69 days	None	–	–
5		Dato'; Abdul Hamid Yusof (1876–1934)	23 November 1931	28 December 1934	3 years, 36 days	None	–	–
Vacant (28 December 1934 – April 1935)
6		Dato'; Ungku Abdul Aziz Ungku Abdul Majid (1887–1951)	April; 1935	1 June 1947		None	–	–
7		Dato'; Onn Jaafar (1895–1962)	1 June 1947	18 May 1950	2 years, 352 days	UMNO	–	–
Vacant (18 May 1950 – 18 February 1952)
8		Dato'; Syed Abdul Kadir Mohamed (1900–1960)	18 February 1952	5 June 1955	3 years, 108 days	UMNO	–	–
8		Dato'; Syed Abdul Kadir Mohamed (1900–1960)	18 February 1952	5 June 1955	3 years, 108 days	Alliance (UMNO)	–	–
Vacant (5 June – 1 October 1955)
9		Dato'; Wan Idris Ibrahim (1888–1973)	1 October 1955	16 June 1959	3 years, 259 days	Alliance (UMNO)	–	–
Vacant (16 – 27 June 1959)
10		Tan Sri Dato'; Hassan Yunus (1907–1968); MLA for Bukit Serampang	27 June 1959	31 January 1967	7 years, 219 days	Alliance (UMNO)	1959	1st
10		Tan Sri Dato'; Hassan Yunus (1907–1968); MLA for Bukit Serampang	27 June 1959	31 January 1967	7 years, 219 days	Alliance (UMNO)	1964	2nd
11		Tan Sri Dato'; Othman Saat (1927–2007); MLA for Jorak (until 1974); MLA for Kesang (from 1974)	4 February 1967	4 April 1982	15 years, 60 days	Alliance (UMNO)	–	2nd
11		Tan Sri Dato'; Othman Saat (1927–2007); MLA for Jorak (until 1974); MLA for Kesang (from 1974)	4 February 1967	4 April 1982	15 years, 60 days	Alliance (UMNO)	1969	3rd
11		Tan Sri Dato'; Othman Saat (1927–2007); MLA for Jorak (until 1974); MLA for Kesang (from 1974)	4 February 1967	4 April 1982	15 years, 60 days	BN (UMNO)	1974	4th
11		Tan Sri Dato'; Othman Saat (1927–2007); MLA for Jorak (until 1974); MLA for Kesang (from 1974)	4 February 1967	4 April 1982	15 years, 60 days	BN (UMNO)	1978	5th
12		Dato'; Abdul Ajib Ahmad (1947–2011); MLA for Endau	29 April 1982	12 August 1986	4 years, 106 days	BN (UMNO)	1982	6th
13		Tan Sri Dato' Haji; Muhyiddin Yassin (born 1947); MLA for Bukit Serampang	12 August 1986	3 May 1995	8 years, 265 days	BN (UMNO)	1986	7th
13		Tan Sri Dato' Haji; Muhyiddin Yassin (born 1947); MLA for Bukit Serampang	12 August 1986	3 May 1995	8 years, 265 days	BN (UMNO)	1990	8th
14		Dato'; Abdul Ghani Othman (born 1946); MLA for Serom	3 May 1995	14 May 2013	18 years, 12 days	BN (UMNO)	1995	9th
14		Dato'; Abdul Ghani Othman (born 1946); MLA for Serom	3 May 1995	14 May 2013	18 years, 12 days	BN (UMNO)	1999	10th
14		Dato'; Abdul Ghani Othman (born 1946); MLA for Serom	3 May 1995	14 May 2013	18 years, 12 days	BN (UMNO)	2004	11th
14		Dato'; Abdul Ghani Othman (born 1946); MLA for Serom	3 May 1995	14 May 2013	18 years, 12 days	BN (UMNO)	2008	12th
15		Dato'; Mohamed Khaled Nordin (born 1958); MLA for Permas	14 May 2013	12 May 2018	4 years, 364 days	BN (UMNO)	2013	13th
16		Dato'; Osman Sapian (1951–2021); MLA for Kempas	12 May 2018	14 April 2019	338 days	PH (BERSATU)	2018	14th
17		Dato'; Sahruddin Jamal (born 1975); MLA for Bukit Kepong	14 April 2019	28 February 2020	321 days	PH (BERSATU)	–	14th
18		Dato'; Hasni Mohammad (born 1959); MLA for Benut	28 February 2020	15 March 2022	2 years, 16 days	BN (UMNO)	–	14th
19		Dato'; Onn Hafiz Ghazi (born 1979); MLA for Machap	15 March 2022	Incumbent	4 years, 247 days	BN (UMNO)	2022	15th
19		Dato'; Onn Hafiz Ghazi (born 1979); MLA for Machap	15 March 2022	Incumbent	4 years, 247 days	BN (UMNO)	2026	16th

== Living former Menteris Besar ==
Name	Term of office	Date of birth
Muhyiddin Yassin	1986–1995	15 May 1947 (age 79)
Abdul Ghani Othman	1995–2013	14 November 1946 (age 80)
Mohamed Khaled Nordin	2013–2018	30 November 1958 (age 67)
Sahruddin Jamal	2019–2020	26 May 1975 (age 51)
Hasni Mohammad	2020–2022	27 March 1959 (age 67)
