= List of post-nominal letters (Johor) =

Honorific order of the Sultanate of Johor

This is a list of post-nominal letters used in Johor. The order in which they follow an individual's name is the same as the order of precedence for the wearing of order insignias, decorations, and medals. When applicable, non-hereditary titles are indicated.

Grades		Post-nominal	Title	Wive's title	Ribbon
The Most Esteemed Royal Family Order of Johor - Darjah Kerabat Johor Yang Amat Dihormati
First Class	Darjah Kerabat Johor Pangkat Pertama	D.K. I	--	--	
Second Class	Darjah Kerabat Johor Pangkat Kedua	D.K. II	--	--	
The Most Honourable Order of the Crown of Johor - Darjah Mahkota Johor Yang Amat Mulia
Grand Commander	Dato' Sri Paduka Mahkota Johor	S.P.M.J.	Dato' / Datin Paduka	Datin (wife name) followed by (Dato' husband name) or Datin (husband surname)	
Commander	Dato' Paduka Mahkota Johor	D.P.M.J.	Dato' / Datin Paduka	Datin (wife name) followed by (Dato' husband name) or Datin (husband surname)	
Companion	Setia Mahkota Johor	S.M.J.	--	--	
The Most Blessed Order of Loyalty of Sultan Ismail of Johor - Darjah Setia Sultan Ismail Johor Yang Amat Diberkati
Grand Commander	Dato' Sri Setia Sultan Ismail Johor	S.S.I.J.	Dato' / Datin Paduka	Datin (wife name) followed by (Dato' husband name) or Datin (husband surname)	
Commander	Dato' Setia Sultan Ismail Johor	D.S.I.J.	Dato' / Datin Paduka	Datin (wife name) followed by (Dato' husband name) or Datin (husband surname)	
The Most Exalted Order of Sultan Ibrahim of Johor - Darjah Mulia Sultan Ibrahim Johor Yang Amat Disanjungi
Grand Commander	Dato' Sri Mulia Sultan Ibrahim Johor	S.M.I.J.	Dato' / Datin Paduka	Datin (wife name) followed by (Dato' husband name) or Datin (husband surname)	
Commander	Dato' Mulia Sultan Ibrahim Johor	D.M.I.J.	Dato' / Datin Paduka	Datin (wife name) followed by (Dato' husband name) or Datin (husband surname)	
Companion	Setia Mulia Sultan Ibrahim Johor	S.I.J.	--	--	
Iron Medal for Valour and Meritorious Conduct - Pingat Besi Kerana Jasa dan Keberanian
First Class	Pingat Besi Pangkat Pertama	P.B. I	--	--	
Second Class	Pingat Besi Pangkat Kedua	P.B. II	--	--	
Medal for Long and Meritorious Service - Pingat Lama dan Jasa dalam Pekerjaan
Silver Medal	Pingat Lama dan Jasa dalam Pekerjaan	P.J.P.	--	--	
Medal for Long Service and Good Conduct - Pingat Lama dan Baik dalam Perkhidmatan
Silver Medal	Pingat Lama dan Baik dalam Perkhidmatan	P.L.P.	--	--	
Sultan Abu Bakar Medal - Pingat Abu Bakar Sultan
Gold Medal	Pingat Abu Bakar Sultan	P.A.B.S.	--	--	
Sultan Ibrahim Medal - Pingat Ibrahim Sultan
First Class	Pingat Ibrahim Sultan Pangkat Pertama	P.I.S. I	--	--	
Second Class	Pingat Ibrahim Sultan Pangkat Kedua	P.I.S. II	--	--	
Third Class	Pingat Ibrahim Sultan Pangkat Ketiga	P.I.S. III	--	--	
Star of Sultan Ismail - Bintang Sultan Ismail
First Class	Bintang Sultan Ismail Pangkat Pertama	B.S.I.	--	--	Sultan Ismail Star
Second Class	Bintang Sultan Ismail Pangkat Kedua	B.S.I. II	--	--	Sultan Ismail Star
Sultan Ibrahim of Johor Medal - Pingat Sultan Ibrahim Johor
First Class	Pingat Sultan Ibrahim Johor Pangkat Pertama	P.S.I. I	--	--	
Second Class	Pingat Sultan Ibrahim Johor Pangkat Kedua	P.S.I. II	--	--	
Third Class	Pingat Sultan Ibrahim Johor Pangkat Ketiga	P.S.I. III	--	--	
Sultan Ibrahim Wedding Medal - Pingat Perkahwinan Sultan Ibrahim
Gold Medal	Pingat Perkahwinan Sultan Ibrahim	--	--	--	
Silver Medal	Pingat Perkahwinan Sultan Ibrahim	--	--	--	
Bronze Medal	Pingat Perkahwinan Sultan Ibrahim	--	--	--	
Sultan Ibrahim Diamond Jubilee Medal - Pingat Jubli Intan Sultan Ibrahim
Gold Medal	Pingat Jubli Intan Sultan Ibrahim	--	--	--	
Silver Medal	Pingat Jubli Intan Sultan Ibrahim	--	--	--	
Bronze Medal	Pingat Jubli Intan Sultan Ibrahim	--	--	--	
Sultan Ibrahim Memorial Medal - Pingat Memorial Sultan Ibrahim
Silver Medal	Pingat Memorial Sultan Ibrahim	--	--	--	
Sultan Ismail Coronation Medal - Pingat Kemahkotaan Sultan Ismail
Gold Medal	Pingat Kemahkotaan Sultan Ismail	--	--	--	
Silver Medal	Pingat Kemahkotaan Sultan Ismail	--	--	--	
Bronze Medal	Pingat Kemahkotaan Sultan Ismail	--	--	--	
Sultan Iskandar Coronation Medal - Pingat Kemahkotaan Sultan Iskandar
Gold Medal	Pingat Kemahkotaan Sultan Iskandar	--	--	--	
Silver Medal	Pingat Kemahkotaan Sultan Iskandar	--	--	--	
Bronze Medal	Pingat Kemahkotaan Sultan Iskandar	--	--	--	
Sultan Ibrahim Coronation Medal - Pingat Kemahkotaan Sultan Ibrahim
Gold Medal	Pingat Kemahkotaan Sultan Ibrahim	--	--	--	
Silver Medal	Pingat Kemahkotaan Sultan Ibrahim	--	--	--	
Bronze Medal	Pingat Kemahkotaan Sultan Ibrahim	--	--	--	

Precedence:

1.	Darjah Kerabat Johor Pangkat Pertama	D.K. I	.
2.	Darjah Kerabat Johor Pangkat Kedua	D.K. II	.
3.	Dato' Sri Paduka Mahkota Johor	S.P.M.J.	Dato' / Datin Paduka
4.	Dato' Sri Setia Sultan Ismail Johor	S.S.I.J.	Dato' / Datin Paduka
5.	Dato' Sri Mulia Sultan Ibrahim Johor	S.M.I.J.	Dato' / Datin Paduka
6.	Dato' Paduka Mahkota Johor	D.P.M.J.	Dato' / Datin Paduka
7.	Dato' Setia Sultan Ismail Johor	D.S.I.J.	Dato' / Datin Paduka
8.	Dato' Mulia Sultan Ibrahim Johor	D.M.I.J.	Dato' / Datin Paduka
9.	Setia Mahkota Johor	S.M.J.
10.	Setia Mulia Sultan Ibrahim Johor	S.I.J.
11.	Pingat Besi Pangkat Pertama	P.B. I
12.	Pingat Besi Pangkat Kedua	P.B. II
13.	Pingat Kerana Lama dan Baik dalam Pekerjaan	P.L.P.
14.	Pingat Jasa dan Lama dalam Perkhidmatan	P.J.P.
15.	Pingat Ibrahim Sultan Pangkat Pertama	P.I.S. I
16.	Pingat Sultan Ibrahim Pangkat Pertama	P.S.I. I
17.	Pingat Ibrahim Sultan Pangkat Kedua	P.I.S. II
18.	Pingat Sultan Ibrahim Pangkat Kedua	P.S.I. II
19.	Pingat Ibrahim Sultan Pangkat Ketiga	P.I.S. III
20.	Pingat Sultan Ibrahim Pangkat Ketiga	P.S.I. III
21.	Bintang Sultan Ismail Pangkat Pertama	B.S.I.
22.	Bintang Sultan Ismail Pangkat Kedua	B.S.I. II
23.	Jaksa Pendamai	J.P.

== See also ==
- Order of precedence in Johor
