= Deputy Minister of Works (Malaysia) =

Malaysian government deputy minister

- Timbalan Menteri Kerja Raya
- Coat of Arms of Government of Malaysia

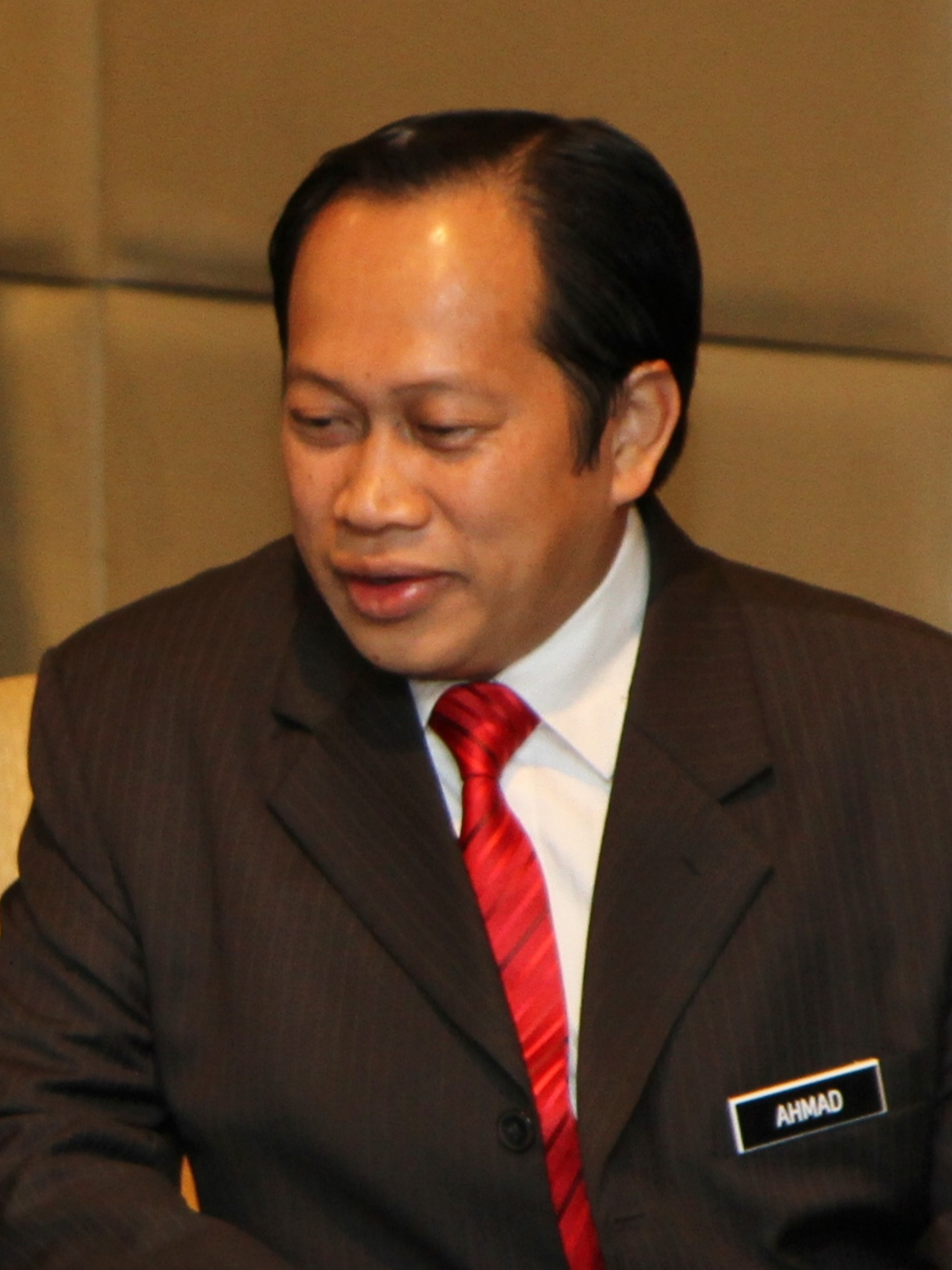
- Incumbent; Ahmad Maslan since 12 December 2023
- Ministry of Works
- Style: Yang Berhormat
- Reports to: Prime Minister; Minister of Works
- Appointer: Yang di-Pertuan Agong on advice of the Prime Minister
- Term length: No fixed term
- Inaugural holder: Richard Ho Ung Hun (as Deputy Minister of Works and Transport)

The Deputy Minister of Works (Malay: Timbalan Menteri Kerja Raya; Chinese: 工程部副部长; Tamil: பணிகள் துணை அமைச்சர் ) is a Malaysian cabinet position serving as deputy head of the Ministry of Works.

== List of Deputy Ministers of Works ==
The following individuals have been appointed as Deputy Minister of Works, or any of its earlier names:

Colour key (for political coalition/parties):

Coalition	Component party	Timeline
Barisan Nasional (BN)	United Malays National Organisation (UMNO)	1973–present
Barisan Nasional (BN)	Malaysian Chinese Association (MCA)	1973–present
Barisan Nasional (BN)	Parti Gerakan Rakyat Malaysia (Gerakan)	1973–2018
Barisan Nasional (BN)	Sabah People's United Front (BERJAYA)	1976–1986
Barisan Nasional (BN)	Parti Bersatu Rakyat Sabah (PBRS)	1994–2018; 2020–present
Barisan Nasional (BN)	Sarawak National Party (SNAP)	1976–2004
Barisan Nasional (BN)	Sarawak United Peoples' Party (SUPP)	1973–2018
Pakatan Harapan (PH)	National Trust Party (AMANAH)	2015–present

=== Deputy Minister of Works and Transport ===
Portrait	Name (Birth–Death) Constituency	Political coalition	Political party	Took office	Left office	Prime Minister (Cabinet)
	Richard Ho Ung Hun (1927–2008); MP for Lumut	BN	MCA			Abdul Razak Hussein (II)
Post spit into Deputy Minister of Works and Public Amenities and Deputy Minister of Transport
=== Deputy Minister of Minister of Works and Public Amenities ===
Portrait	Name (Birth–Death) Constituency	Political coalition	Political party	Took office	Left office	Prime Minister (Cabinet)
	Goh Cheng Teik (?–?); MP for Nibong Tebal	BN	Gerakan	1976	1978	Hussein Onn (I)
	Nik Hussein Wan Abdul Rahman (?–?); MP for Kuala Krai	BN	UMNO	1978		Hussein Onn (II)
	Clarence E. Mansul (?–?); MP for Penampang	BN	BERJAYA		1981	Hussein Onn (II)
	Nik Hussein Wan Abdul Rahman (?–?); MP for Kuala Krai	BN	UMNO	17 July 1981	7 June 1983	Mahathir Mohamad (I · II)
Post renamed into Deputy Minister of Works
=== Deputy Minister of Works ===
Portrait	Name (Birth–Death) Constituency	Political coalition	Political party	Took office	Left office	Prime Minister (Cabinet)
	Nik Hussein Wan Abdul Rahman (?–?); MP for Kuala Krai	BN	UMNO	7 June 1983	16 July 1984	Mahathir Mohamad (II)
	Zainal Abidin Zin (b.1940); MP for Bagan Serai	BN	UMNO	16 July 1984	10 August 1986	Mahathir Mohamad (II)
	Mustaffa Mohammad (b.1941); MP for Sri Gading	BN	UMNO	11 August 1986	20 May 1987	Mahathir Mohamad (III)
	Luhat Wan (?–?); MP for Baram	BN	SNAP	20 May 1987	26 October 1990	Mahathir Mohamad (III)
	Alexander Lee Yu Lung (?–?); MP for Batu	BN	Gerakan	14 August 1989	26 October 1990	Mahathir Mohamad (III)
	Kerk Choo Ting (1941–2018); MP for Taiping	BN	Gerakan	27 October 1990	3 May 1995	Mahathir Mohamad (IIII)
	Peter Tinggom Kamarau (?–?); MP for Saratok	BN	SNAP	27 October 1990	3 May 1995	Mahathir Mohamad (IIII)
	Railey Jeffrey (1945–2020); MP for Silam	BN	UMNO	8 May 1995	14 December 1999	Mahathir Mohamad (V)
	Mohamed Khaled Nordin (b.1958); MP for Johor Bahru	BN	UMNO	15 December 1999	26 March 2004	Mahathir Mohamad (VI); Abdullah Ahmad Badawi (I)
	Mohd Zin Mohamed (b.1953); MP for Sepang	BN	UMNO	27 March 2004	18 March 2008	Abdullah Ahmad Badawi (II)
	Yong Khoon Seng (b.1941); MP for Stampin	BN	SUPP	19 March 2008	15 May 2013	Abdullah Ahmad Badawi (III); Najib Razak (I)
	Rosnah Abdul Rashid Shirlin (b.1972); MP for Papar	BN	UMNO	16 May 2013	9 May 2018	Najib Razak (II)
	Mohd Anuar Mohd Tahir (b.1952); MP for Temerloh	PH	AMANAH	2 July 2018	24 February 2020	Mahathir Mohamad (VII)
	Shahruddin Md Salleh (b.1956); MP for Sri Gading	PN	BERSATU	10 March 2020	4 June 2020	Muhyiddin Yassin (I)
	Eddin Syazlee Shith (b.1974); MP for Kuala Pilah	PN	BERSATU	6 July 2020	16 August 2021	Muhyiddin Yassin (I)
	Arthur Joseph Kurup (b.1982); MP for Pensiangan	BN	PBRS	30 August 2021	24 November 2022	Ismail Sabri Yaakob (I)
	Abdul Rahman Mohamad (b.1964); MP for Lipis	BN	UMNO	10 December 2022	12 December 2023	Anwar Ibrahim (I)
	Ahmad Maslan (b.1966); MP for Pontian	BN	UMNO	12 December 2023	Incumbent	Anwar Ibrahim (I)

== See also ==
- Minister of Works (Malaysia)
