= Sri Gading (federal constituency) =

Federal constituency in Johor, Malaysia

Sri Gading (P149)
Johor constituency

Federal constituency
- Legislature: Dewan Rakyat
- MP: Aminolhuda Hassan; PH
- Constituency created: 1974
- First contested: 1974
- Last contested: 2022

Demographics
- Population (2020): 175,174
- Electors (2026): 82,900
- Area (km²): 300
- Pop. density (per km²): 583.9

Sri Gading is a federal constituency in Batu Pahat District, Johor, Malaysia, that has been represented in the Dewan Rakyat since 1974.

The federal constituency was created in the 1974 redistribution and is mandated to return a single member to the Dewan Rakyat under the first past the post voting system.

== Demographics ==
Ethnic breakdown of Sri Gading's electorate as of 2022
1. Malay (64.7%)
2. Chinese (33.9%)
3. Indian (1.30%)
4. Other ethnicities (0.20%)

As of 2020, Sri Gading has a population of 175,154 people.

Age breakdown of Sri Gading's electorate as of 2022
1. 18-20 (7.34%)
2. 21-29 (24.5%)
3. 30-39 (20.9%)
4. 40-49 (16.3%)
5. 50-59 (14.4%)
6. 60-69 (9.92%)
7. 70-79 (4.42%)
8. 80-89 (1.87%)
9. above 90 (0.27%)
Gender breakdown of Sri Gading's electorate as of 2022
1. Male (49.5%)
2. Female (50.5%)

== History ==
=== Polling districts ===
According to the gazette issued on 2 July 2026, the Sri Gading constituency has a total of 30 polling districts.

State constituency	Polling Districts	Code	Location
Parit Yaani（N21）	Parit Jambi	149/21/01	SK Tenaga Sepakat
Parit Yaani（N21）	Parit Selulun	149/21/02	SK Seri Tanjong
Parit Yaani（N21）	Bukit Rahmat	149/21/03	SK Bukit Rahmat
Parit Yaani（N21）	Tongkang Pechah	149/21/04	SJK (C) Tongkang
Parit Yaani（N21）	Bandar Tongkang Pechah	149/21/05	SK Seri Binjai
Parit Yaani（N21）	Parit Buloh	149/21/06	SK Bindu
Parit Yaani（N21）	Pekan Parit Yaani	149/21/07	SJK (C) Yani
Parit Yaani（N21）	Kampong Bahru Parit Yaani	149/21/08	SK Seri Telok
Parit Yaani（N21）	Kampong Bahru	149/21/09	SK Seri Idaman
Parit Yaani（N21）	Parit Yob	149/21/10	SK Seri Bengkal
Parit Yaani（N21）	Broleh Utara	149/21/11	SK Seri Beroleh; SA Seri Beroleh; SJK (C) Hwan Nan
Parit Yaani（N21）	Broleh Tengah	149/21/12	SK Bukit Soga; SK Seri Beroleh
Parit Yaani（N21）	Bukit Pasir Timor	149/21/13	SJK (C) Sin Hwa; SJK (C) Hua Min
Parit Raja（N22）	Taman Sri Saga	149/22/01	SMK Munshi Sulaiman
Parit Raja（N22）	Broleh Selatan	149/22/02	Blok Bistari, Institut Pendidikan Guru, Kampus Tun Hussein Onn Batu Pahat
Parit Raja（N22）	Batu Enam	149/22/03	SJK (C) Panchor
Parit Raja（N22）	Sri Gading	149/22/04	SK Sri Gading
Parit Raja（N22）	Bandar Sri Gading	149/22/05	SJK (C) Chong Hwa Sri Gading
Parit Raja（N22）	Tanjong Sembrong	149/22/06	SK Tg Semberong
Parit Raja（N22）	Bandar Parit Raja Utara	149/22/07	SMK Tun Ismail
Parit Raja（N22）	Bandar Parit Raja Selatan	149/22/08	SK Parit Raja
Parit Raja（N22）	Pintas Puding	149/22/09	SK Pintas Puding
Parit Raja（N22）	Parit Jelutong	149/22/10	SK Jelutong
Parit Raja（N22）	Pintas Raya	149/22/11	SK Pintas Raya
Parit Raja（N22）	Sri Gading Estate	149/22/12	SJK (T) Ladang Sri Gading
Parit Raja（N22）	Parit Kampong Baru	149/22/13	SK Seri Aman
Parit Raja（N22）	Parit Sri Pandan	149/22/14	SK Seri Pandan
Parit Raja（N22）	Parit Lapis Sempadan	149/22/15	SK Seri Puleh
Parit Raja（N22）	Parit Raja	149/22/16	SMA Parit Raja
Parit Raja（N22）	Parit Sri Menanti	149/22/17	SK Seri Timbul

=== Representation history ===
Members of Parliament for Sri Gading
Parliament	No	Years	Member	Party	Vote Share
Constituency created from Batu Pahat Dalam, Kluang Utara, Kluang Selatan and Pontian Utara
4th	P109	1974–1978	Hussein Onn (حسين عون)	BN (UMNO)	Uncontested
5th	P109	1978–1981	Hussein Onn (حسين عون)	BN (UMNO)	19,761; 89.06%
5th	P109	1981–1982	Mustaffa Mohammad (مصطفى محمّد)	BN (UMNO)	21,037; 91.42%
6th	P109	1982–1986	Mustaffa Mohammad (مصطفى محمّد)	BN (UMNO)	23,369; 88.46%
7th	P124	1986–1990	Mustaffa Mohammad (مصطفى محمّد)	BN (UMNO)	Uncontested
8th	P124	1990–1995	Mohd. Yasin Kamari (محمد. يسٓ قمري)	BN (UMNO)	22,205; 74.44%
9th	P134	1995–1999	Hamzah Ramli (حمزة رملي)	BN (UMNO)	31,353; 86.24%
10th	P134	1999–2004	Mohamad Aziz (محمد عزيز)	BN (UMNO)	29,156; 71.54%
11th	P149	2004–2008	Mohamad Aziz (محمد عزيز)	BN (UMNO)	21,512; 80.18%
12th	P149	2008–2013	Mohamad Aziz (محمد عزيز)	BN (UMNO)	19,641; 69.14%
13th	P149	2013–2018	Ab Aziz Kaprawi (عبدالعزيز کڤراوي)	BN (UMNO)	22,453; 57.36%
14th	P149	2018–2020	Shahruddin Md Salleh (شهرالدين مد صالح)	PH (BERSATU)	21,511; 48.58%
14th	P149	2020	Shahruddin Md Salleh (شهرالدين مد صالح)	PN (BERSATU)	21,511; 48.58%
14th	P149	2020	Shahruddin Md Salleh (شهرالدين مد صالح)	Independent	21,511; 48.58%
14th	P149	2020–2022	Shahruddin Md Salleh (شهرالدين مد صالح)	PEJUANG	21,511; 48.58%
15th	P149	2022–present	Aminolhuda Hassan (أمين الهدى حسّان)	PH (AMANAH)	23,242; 37.42%

=== State constituency ===
Parliamentary constituency	State constituency						
Parliamentary constituency	1954–59*	1959–1974	1974–1986	1986–1995	1995–2004	2004–2018	2018–present
Sri Gading			Parit Raja				
Sri Gading				Parit Yaani			
Sri Gading			Simpang Renggam				

=== Historical boundaries ===
State Constituency	Area				
State Constituency	1974	1984	1994	2003	2018
Parit Raja	Kampung Parit Seri Mendapat; Parit Raja; Parit Yob; Sri Gading; Tongkang Pechah	Sri Gading; Parit Haji Ali; Parit Haji Hassan; Parit Lapis Darat; Parit Raja		Kampung Sengkuang; Sri Gading; Parit Haji Hassan; Parit Lapis Darat; Parit Raja	
Parit Yaani		Ayer Hitam; Kampung Parit Semarang Darat; Kampung Parit Seri Mendapat; Parit Yaani; Tongkang Pechah		Parit Buloh; Parit Kassim; Parit Yaani; Taman Gembira; Tongkang Pechah	
Simpang Renggam	Simpang Renggam; Kampung Melayu Bukit Nyamuk; Kampung Parit Lapis Darat; Kampung Paya; Kampung Simpang Enam				

=== Current state assembly members ===
No.	State Constituency	Member	Coalition (Party)
N21	Parit Yaani	Mohamad Najib Samuri	BN (UMNO)
N22	Parit Raja	Nor Rashidah Ramli	BN (UMNO)

=== Local governments & postcodes ===
No.	State Constituency	Local Government	Postcode
N21	Parit Yaani	Batu Pahat Municipal Council; Yong Peng District Council (Parit Yaani area)	83000 Batu Pahat; 83300 Sri Gading; 83700 Yong Peng; 86400 Parit Raja
N22	Parit Raja	Batu Pahat Municipal Council; Yong Peng District Council (Parit Raja area)	83000 Batu Pahat; 83300 Sri Gading; 83700 Yong Peng; 86400 Parit Raja

== Election results ==
Malaysian general election, 2022
Party	Candidate	Votes	%	∆%
PH	Aminolhuda Hassan	23,242	37.42	▲37.42
BN	Mohd Lassim Burhan	19,242	30.90	▼10.25
PN	Zanariyah Abdul Hamid	18,475	29.70	▲29.70
PEJUANG	Mahdzir Ibrahim	305	0.50	▲0.50
Total valid votes		61,264	100.00	
Total rejected ballots		636		
Unreturned ballots		198		
Turnout		62,098	77.94	▼8.77
Registered electors		78,602		
Majority		4,000	6.52	▼0.91
PH hold		Swing		
Source(s) https://lom.agc.gov.my/ilims/upload/portal/akta/outputp/1753254/PUB%20617%20PARLIMEN%20JOHOR.pdf

Malaysian general election, 2018
Party	Candidate	Votes	%	∆%
PKR	Shahruddin Md Salleh	21,511	48.58	▲5.94
BN	Ab Aziz Kaprawi	18,223	41.15	▼16.21
PAS	M Ashari Sidon	4,548	10.27	▲10.27
Total valid votes		44,282	100.00	
Total rejected ballots		635		
Unreturned ballots		276		
Turnout		45,193	86.71	▼2.32
Registered electors		52,119		
Majority		3,288	7.43	▼7.29
PKR gain from BN		Swing		?
Source(s) "His Majesty's Government Gazette - Notice of Contested Election, Parliament for the State of Johore [P.U. (B) 244/2018]" (PDF). Attorney General's Chambers of Malaysia. 3 May 2018. "Federal Government Gazette - Results of Contested Election and Statements of the Poll after the Official Addition of Votes, Parliamentary Constituencies for the State of Johore [P.U. (B) 318/2018]" (PDF). Attorney General's Chambers of Malaysia. 28 May 2018.

Malaysian general election, 2013
Party	Candidate	Votes	%	∆%
BN	Ab Aziz Kaprawi	22,453	57.36	▼11.78
PKR	Mohd Khuzzan Abu Bakar	16,692	42.64	▲11.78
Total valid votes		39,145	100.00	
Total rejected ballots		673		
Unreturned ballots		81		
Turnout		39,899	89.03	▲9.60
Registered electors		44,816		
Majority		5,761	14.72	▼23.56
BN hold		Swing		
Source(s) "Federal Government Gazette - Notice of Contested Election, Parliament for the State of Johore [P.U. (B) 181/2013]" (PDF). Attorney General's Chambers of Malaysia. 26 April 2013. "Federal Government Gazette - Results of Contested Election and Statements of the Poll after the Official Addition of Votes, Parliamentary Constituencies for the State of Johore [P.U. (B) 222/2013]" (PDF). Attorney General's Chambers of Malaysia. 22 May 2013.

Malaysian general election, 2008
Party	Candidate	Votes	%	∆%
BN	Mohamad Aziz	19,641	69.14	▼11.04
PKR	Ali Markom	8,767	30.86	▲11.04
Total valid votes		28,408	100.00	
Total rejected ballots		738		
Unreturned ballots		120		
Turnout		29,266	79.43	▲4.51
Registered electors		36,845		
Majority		10,874	38.28	▼22.08
BN hold		Swing		

Malaysian general election, 2004
Party	Candidate	Votes	%	∆%
BN	Mohamad Aziz	21,512	80.18	▲8.64
PKR	Ahmad Faidhi Saidi	5,316	19.82	▲19.82
Total valid votes		26,828	100.00	
Total rejected ballots		0		
Unreturned ballots		0		
Turnout		26,828	74.92	▲0.10
Registered electors		35,808		
Majority		16,196	60.36	▲17.28
BN hold		Swing		

Malaysian general election, 1999
Party	Candidate	Votes	%	∆%
BN	Mohamad Aziz	29,156	71.54	▼14.70
PAS	Khalid Abdul Samad	11,598	28.46	▲28.46
Total valid votes		40,754	100.00	
Total rejected ballots		866		
Unreturned ballots		67		
Turnout		41,687	74.82	▲1.38
Registered electors		55,716		
Majority		17,558	43.08	▼29.40
BN hold		Swing		

Malaysian general election, 1995
Party	Candidate	Votes	%	∆%
BN	Hamzah Ramli	31,353	86.24	▲11.80
S46	Kamelah Yahaya	5,003	13.76	▼11.80
Total valid votes		36,356	100.00	
Total rejected ballots		1,700		
Unreturned ballots		66		
Turnout		38,122	73.44	▼2.07
Registered electors		51,909		
Majority		26,350	72.48	▲23.60
BN hold		Swing		

Malaysian general election, 1990
Party	Candidate	Votes	%	∆%
BN	Mohd. Yasin Kamari	22,205	74.44	▲74.44
S46	Zawawi Mohd. Zin	7,625	25.56	▲25.56
Total valid votes		29,830	100.00	
Total rejected ballots		1,135		
Unreturned ballots		0		
Turnout		30,965	75.51	
Registered electors		41,007		
Majority		14,580	48.88	
BN hold		Swing		

Malaysian general election, 1986
Party	Candidate	Votes	%	∆%
On the nomination day, Mustaffa Mohammad won uncontested.
BN	Mustaffa Mohammad			
Total valid votes			100.00	
Total rejected ballots				
Unreturned ballots				
Turnout				
Registered electors				
Majority				
BN hold		Swing		

Malaysian general election, 1982
Party	Candidate	Votes	%	∆%
BN	Mustaffa Mohammad	23,369	88.46	▼2.96
PAS	Ahmad Kailani	3,048	11.54	▲2.96
Total valid votes		26,417	100.00	
Total rejected ballots		972		
Unreturned ballots		0		
Turnout		27,389	76.66	
Registered electors		35,727		
Majority		20,321	76.92	▼5.92
BN hold		Swing		

Malaysian general by-election, 27 September 1981 Upon the resignation of incumbent, Hussein Onn
Party	Candidate	Votes	%	∆%
BN	Mustaffa Mohammad	21,037	91.42	▲2.36
PAS	Mohamed Sulaiman @ Mohamed Anuar	1,974	8.58	▼2.36
Total valid votes		23,011	100.00	
Total rejected ballots		463		
Unreturned ballots				
Turnout		23,474		
Registered electors				
Majority		19,063	82.84	▲4.72
BN hold		Swing		

Malaysian general election, 1978
Party	Candidate	Votes	%	∆%
BN	Hussein Onn	19,761	89.06	▲89.06
PAS	Hassan Hussein	2,427	10.94	▲10.94
Total valid votes		22,188	100.00	
Total rejected ballots		833		
Unreturned ballots		0		
Turnout		23,021	77.88	
Registered electors		29,558		
Majority		17,334	78.12	
BN hold		Swing		

Malaysian general election, 1974
Party	Candidate	Votes	%
On the nomination day, Hussein Onn won uncontested.
BN	Hussein Onn		
Total valid votes			100.00
Total rejected ballots			
Unreturned ballots			
Turnout			
Registered electors		25,972	
Majority			
This was a new constituency created.
