= Mohd Khuzzan Abu Bakar =

Malaysian politician

- محمد خوزان بن أبو بكر

Deputy Chairman of the Talent Corporation Malaysia Berhad
- Incumbent
- Assumed office 12 June 2024
- Minister: Steven Sim Chee Keong
- Chairperson: Wong Shu Qi
- Chief Executive Officer: Chan Leng Wai

Member of the Johor State Executive Council (Youth, Sports and Culture : 16 May 2018 – 21 April 2019) (Health, Culture and Heritage : 22 April 2019 – 27 February 2020)
- In office 16 May 2018 – 27 February 2020
- Monarch: Ibrahim Iskandar
- Menteri Besar: Osman Sapian; Sahruddin Jamal
- Preceded by: Zulkurnain Kamisan
- Succeeded by: Vidyananthan Ramanadhan (Health); Mazlan Bujang (Culture and Heritage)
- Constituency: Semerah

Member of the Johor State Legislative Assembly for Semerah
- In office 9 May 2018 – 12 March 2022
- Preceded by: Mohd Ismail Roslan (BN–UMNO)
- Succeeded by: Mohd Fared Mohd Khalid (BN–UMNO)
- Majority: 98 (2018)

Personal details
- Born: Mohd Khuzzan bin Abu Bakar; 15 November 1968 (age 57) Johor, Malaysia
- Citizenship: Malaysian
- Party: People's Justice Party (PKR)
- Other political affiliations: Pakatan Harapan (PH)
- Occupation: Politician

Mohd Khuzzan bin Abu Bakar (born 15 November 1968) is a Malaysian politician who has served as Deputy Chairman of the Talent Corporation Malaysia Berhad (TalentCorp) since June 2024. He served as Member of the Johor State Executive Council (EXCO) in the Pakatan Harapan (PH) state administration under former Menteris Besar Osman Sapian and Sahruddin Jamal from May 2018 to the collapse of the PH state administration in February 2020 and Member of the Johor State Legislative Assembly (MLA) for Semerah from May 2018 to March 2022. He is a member of the People's Justice Party (PKR), a component party of the PH coalition.

== Election results ==
Parliament of Malaysia
Year	Constituency	Candidate	Votes	Pct	Opponent(s)	Votes	Pct	Ballots cast	Majority	Turnout
2013	P149 Sri Gading	Mohd Khuzzan Abu Bakar (PKR)	16,692	42.64%	Ab Aziz Kaprawi (UMNO)	22,453	57.36%	39,818	5,761	89.03%

Johor State Legislative Assembly
Year	Constituency	Candidate	Votes	Pct	Opponent(s)	Votes	Pct	Ballots cast	Majority	Turnout
2018	N17 Semerah	Mohd Khuzzan Abu Bakar (PKR)	12,619	42.84%	Mohd Ismail Roslan (UMNO)	12,521	42.51%	29,846	98	83.94%
2018	N17 Semerah	Mohd Khuzzan Abu Bakar (PKR)	12,619	42.84%	Adnan Othman (PAS)	4,314	14.65%	29,846	98	83.94%
2022	N17 Semerah	Mohd Khuzzan Abu Bakar (PKR)	6,265	22.44%	Mohd Fared Mohd Khalid (UMNO)	12,542	44.93%	27,916	4,041	59.85%
2022	N17 Semerah	Mohd Khuzzan Abu Bakar (PKR)	6,265	22.44%	Ariss Samsudin (BERSATU)	8,501	30.45%	27,916	4,041	59.85%
2022	N17 Semerah	Mohd Khuzzan Abu Bakar (PKR)	6,265	22.44%	Mahdzir Ibrahim (PEJUANG)	361	1.29%	27,916	4,041	59.85%
2022	N17 Semerah	Mohd Khuzzan Abu Bakar (PKR)	6,265	22.44%	Kamarolzaman Mohd Jidin (PUTRA)	247	0.88%	27,916	4,041	59.85%
