= Mohamad Aziz =

Malaysian politician (1940–2020)

Yang Berbahagia Tan Sri Mohamad Aziz PSM PJN SMJ KMN AMN PIS BSI PPN
- محمد عزيز

Speaker of the Johor State Legislative Assembly
- In office 20 June 2013 – 7 April 2018
- Monarch: Ibrahim Ismail
- Menteri Besar: Mohamed Khaled Nordin
- Deputy: Baderi Dasuki
- Preceded by: Mohamed Ali Hassan
- Succeeded by: Suhaizan Kayat
- Constituency: Non-MLA (Barisan Nasional)

Member of the Malaysian Parliament for Sri Gading, Johor
- In office 29 November 1999 – 5 May 2013
- Preceded by: Hamzah Ramli
- Succeeded by: Aziz Kaprawi
- Majority: 17,558 (1999); 16,196 (2004); 10,874 (2008)

Member of the Johor State Legislative Assembly for Parit Yaani
- In office 22 April 1986 – 29 November 1999
- Preceded by: Constituency created
- Succeeded by: Hamzah Ramli
- Majority: Unopposed (1986); 6,320 (1990); 13,365 (1995)

Personal details
- Born: Mohamad Abdul Aziz; 29 July 1940 Batu Pahat, Johor, British Malaya (now Malaysia)
- Died: 24 December 2020 (aged 80) Johor Bahru, Johor, Malaysia
- Resting place: Bukit Aliff Muslim Cemetery, Johor Bahru, Johor
- Party: United Malays National Organisation (UMNO)
- Other political affiliations: Barisan Nasional (BN); Perikatan Nasional (PN); Muafakat Nasional (MN)
- Spouse(s): Radin Faridah Radin Ahmad; Azizah Zakaria
- Children: 11
- Occupation: Politician

Mohamad bin Aziz (29 July 1940 – 24 December 2020) was the Member of the Parliament of Malaysia for the Sri Gading constituency in the state of Johor from 1999 to 2013. He sat in Parliament as a member of the United Malays National Organisation (UMNO) party in the governing Barisan Nasional coalition.

Mohamad was a member of the Executive Council (akin to a State Cabinet) of Johor from 1990 to 1995 and the Johor State Government Information Chief from 1995 to 1999. In 1999 he was elected to Parliament for the Sri Gading constituency.

Mohamad caused controversy in 2009 when he called for two ministers in his Barisan Nasional government to resign. In June 2012, he called in Parliament for the execution for treason of the electoral reform activist Ambiga Sreenevasan.

His parliamentary career ended in 2013, when UMNO selected another candidate to contest the Sri Gading constituency. After the 2013 election, he was appointed as the Speaker of the Johor State Legislative Assembly.

He was also Umno Malaysia Deputy Permanent Chairman since 2008.

== Death ==
Mohamad Aziz died on 24 December 2020 at the age of 80. He was laid to rest in the burial grounds at Bukit Aliff Muslim cemetery, Johor Bahru.

== Election results ==
Parliament of Malaysia
Year	Constituency	Candidate	Votes	Pct	Opponent(s)	Votes	Pct	Ballots cast	Majority	Turnout
1999	P149 Sri Gading	Mohamad Aziz (UMNO)	29,156	71.54%	Khalid Abdul Samad (PAS)	11,598	28.46%	41,687	17,558	74.82%
2004	P149 Sri Gading	Mohamad Aziz (UMNO)	21,512	80.18%	Ahmad Faidhi Saidi (PKR)	5,316	19.82%	26,828	16,196	74.92%
2008	P149 Sri Gading	Mohamad Aziz (UMNO)	19,641	69.14%	Ali Markom (PKR)	8,767	30.86%	29,266	10,874	79.43%

Johor State Legislative Assembly
Year	Constituency	Candidate	Votes	Pct	Opponent(s)	Votes	Pct	Ballots cast	Majority	Turnout
1986	N19 Parit Yaani	Mohamad Aziz (UMNO)	Unopposed							
1990	N19 Parit Yaani	Mohamad Aziz (UMNO)	10,244	72.30%	Mohd Saidi Taul (S46)	3,924	27.70%	14,938	6,320	74.53%
1995	N19 Parit Yaani	Mohamad Aziz (UMNO)	15,713	87.00%	Mohd Said Jamhari (S46)	2,348	13.00%	18,709	13,365	73.27%

== Honours ==
=== Honours of Malaysia ===
- Malaysia
  - Medallist of the Order of the Defender of the Realm (PPN) (1976)
  - Member of the Order of the Defender of the Realm (AMN) (1979)
  - Officer of the Order of the Defender of the Realm (KMN) (1989)
  - Commander of the Order of Meritorious Service (PJN) – Datuk (1996)
  - Commander of the Order of Loyalty to the Crown of Malaysia (PSM) – Tan Sri (2014)
- Johor
  - Second Class of the Sultan Ibrahim Medal (PIS II)
  - Second Class of the Star of Sultan Ismail (BSI II)
  - Companion of the Order of the Crown of Johor (SMJ) (1992)
