= Aminolhuda Hassan =

Malaysian politician

Yang Berhormat Tuan Aminolhuda Hassan MP
- أَمِينُ ٱلْهُدَى حَسَّان

Member of the Malaysian Parliament for Sri Gading
- Incumbent
- Assumed office 19 November 2022
- Preceded by: Shahruddin Md Salleh (PH–BERSATU)
- Majority: 4,000 (2022)

State Leader of the Opposition of Johor
- In office 1 April 2020 – 12 March 2022
- Monarch: Ibrahim Iskandar
- Menteri Besar: Hasni Mohammad
- Preceded by: Hasni Mohammad
- Succeeded by: Liew Chin Tong
- Constituency: Parit Yaani

Member of the Johor State Executive Council (Islamic Religious Affairs and Education : 16 May 2018–21 April 2019) (Education, Human Resources, Science and Technology : 22 April 2019–28 February 2020)
- In office 16 May 2018 – 28 February 2020
- Monarch: Ibrahim Iskandar
- Menteri Besar: Osman Sapian (2018–2019); Sahruddin Jamal (2019–2020)
- Preceded by: Abd Mutalip Abd Rahim (Islamic Religious Affairs); Ayub Rahmat (Education)
- Succeeded by: Mazlan Bujang (Education, Science and Technology); Mohd Izhar Ahmad (Human Resources)
- Constituency: Parit Yaani

Member of the Johor State Legislative Assembly for Parit Yaani
- In office 5 May 2013 – 12 March 2022
- Preceded by: Ng See Tiong (BN–MCA)
- Succeeded by: Mohamad Najib Samuri (BN–UMNO)
- Majority: 1,188 (2013); 4,834 (2018)

State Chairman of Pakatan Harapan of Johor
- Incumbent
- Assumed office 13 February 2025
- National Chairman: Anwar Ibrahim
- Deputies: Syed Ibrahim Syed Noh & Teo Nie Ching
- Preceded by: Salahuddin Ayub
- In office 28 February 2020 – 21 September 2022
- National Chairman: Anwar Ibrahim
- Preceded by: Muhyiddin Yassin
- Succeeded by: Salahuddin Ayub

State Chairman of the National Trust Party of Johor
- Incumbent
- Assumed office 16 September 2015
- President: Mohamad Sabu
- Deputy: Dzulkefly Ahmad
- Preceded by: Position established

Personal details
- Born: Aminolhuda bin Hassan; 3 January 1959 (age 67) Muar, Johor, Federation of Malaya (now Malaysia)
- Citizenship: Malaysia
- Party: Malaysian Islamic Party (PAS) (until 2015); National Trust Party (AMANAH) (since 2015)
- Other political affiliations: Pakatan Rakyat (PR) (until 2015); Pakatan Harapan (PH) (since 2015)
- Spouse: Naomie Salim
- Children: 5
- Education: SMS Johor
- Alma mater: University of Putra Malaysia; King's College London
- Occupation: Politician
- Profession: Teacher
- Website: Facebook

Aminolhuda bin Hassan is a Malaysian politician and former headmaster who has served as the Member of Parliament (MP) for Sri Gading since November 2022. He served as the Leader of the Opposition of Johor from April 2020 to March 2022 and Member of the Johor State Legislative Assembly (MLA) for Parit Yaani from May 2013 to March 2022. He is a member of the National Trust Party (AMANAH), a component party of the Pakatan Harapan (PH) coalition and was a member of the Malaysian Islamic Party (PAS), then component party of then Pakatan Rakyat (PR) coalition. He has served as the State Chairman of AMANAH of Johor since September 2015. He also served as State Chairman of PH of Johor from February 2020 to September 2022 and resumed the position since February 2025. He served as Member of the Johor State Executive Council (EXCO) in the PH state administration under former Menteris Besar Osman Sapian and Sahruddin Jamal from May 2018 to the collapse of the PH state administration in February 2020.

Prior to being active in politics, he was the headmaster of English College Johore Bahru.

In January 2021, Aminolhuda was tested positive for COVID-19 and had recovered after 14 days in Hospital Sultanah Aminah (HSA), Johor Bahru.

== Election results ==
Parliament of Malaysia
Year	Constituency	Candidate	Votes	Pct	Opponent(s)	Votes	Pct	Ballots cast	Majority	Turnout
2022	P149 Sri Gading	Aminolhuda Hassan (AMANAH)	23,242	37.84%	Lassim Burhan (UMNO)	19,242	31.41%	61,264	4,000	77.94%
2022	P149 Sri Gading	Aminolhuda Hassan (AMANAH)	23,242	37.84%	Zanariyah Abdul Hamid (PAS)	18,475	30.16%	61,264	4,000	77.94%
2022	P149 Sri Gading	Aminolhuda Hassan (AMANAH)	23,242	37.84%	Mahdzir Ibrahim (PEJUANG)	305	0.50%	61,264	4,000	77.94%

Johor State Legislative Assembly
Year	Constituency	Candidate	Votes	Pct	Opponent(s)	Votes	Pct	Ballots cast	Majority	Turnout
2013	N21 Parit Yaani	Aminolhuda Hassan (PAS)	11,278	52.78%	Teo Yew Chuan (MCA)	10,090	47.22%	21,747	1,188	88.50%
2018	N21 Parit Yaani	Aminolhuda Hassan (AMANAH)	12,309	54.16%	Soh Lip Yan (MCA)	7,475	32.89%	23,158	4,834	86.90%
2018	N21 Parit Yaani	Aminolhuda Hassan (AMANAH)	12,309	54.16%	Nasir Abdullah (PAS)	2,943	12.95%	23,158	4,834	86.90%
2022	N21 Parit Yaani	Aminolhuda Hassan (AMANAH)	8,776	37.31%	Mohamad Najib Samuri (UMNO)	9,070	38.56%	23,520	294	56.20%
2022	N21 Parit Yaani	Aminolhuda Hassan (AMANAH)	8,776	37.31%	Ahmad Nawfal Mahfodz (PAS)	5,435	23.11%	23,520	294	56.20%
2022	N21 Parit Yaani	Aminolhuda Hassan (AMANAH)	8,776	37.31%	Mohd Ridhauddin Mohd Tahir (PEJUANG)	239	1.02%	23,520	294	56.20%

== Honours ==
=== Honours of Malaysia ===
- Malaysia
  - Recipient of the 17th Yang di-Pertuan Agong Installation Medal (2024)
