= Suhaimi Kamaruddin =

Malaysian lawyer and politician

Yang Berbahagia Dato' Suhaimi Kamaruddin DPMS SMS AMN
- سحيمي قمرالدين

7th Youth Chief of the United Malays National Organisation
- In office 1977–1982
- Preceded by: Syed Jaafar Albar
- Succeeded by: Anwar Ibrahim

Member of the Malaysian Parliament for Sepang
- In office 1974–1982
- Preceded by: Lee Siok Yew
- Succeeded by: Mohd. Sharif Jajang
- Constituency: Sepang

Personal details
- Born
- Party: United Malays National Organisation (UMNO) (until 1988; 1996–present); Semangat 46 (1988–1996)
- Other political affiliations: Barisan Nasional (BN) (until 1988; 1996–present); Perikatan Nasional (PN) (2020–present); Muafakat Nasional (MN) (2019–present); Angkatan Perpaduan Ummah (APU) (1990–1996); Gagasan Rakyat (GR) (1990–1996)
- Spouse: Umi Khalsom Abdul Karim
- Relations: Dato' Kamaruddin Idris (father), Tan Sri Azmi Kamaruddin (brother), Dato' Seri Harun Idris (uncle)
- Children: 5
- Occupation: Lawyer

Suhaimi bin Kamaruddin (Jawi: سحيمي قمرالدين, Malay pronunciation: [suhaimi]) is a Malaysian politician and a lawyer by profession. He was a former chief of UMNO Youth and a former Deputy Minister in the federal government. He is a member of the United Malays National Organisation (UMNO), the largest political party in the former ruling Barisan Nasional (BN) coalition. He was the Member of Parliament for Sepang in Selangor for three terms from 1974 to 1986 representing BN.

He was also the former president of the Gerakan Belia 4B Malaysia youth association.

== Early life and career ==
Suhaimi was born as the son of former Menteri Besar of Terrenganu, Dato' Perdana Menteri Di Raja Dato' Seri Setia Raja Kamaruddin Idris. After attending a local primary school, he later attended the Malay College Kuala Kangsar for his secondary education. He went on to gain an LL.B. fromrom the University of Birmingham in Law, and obtained his Bar.

His entry into politics brought with him much acclaim as a politician, and he quickly rose up the ranks of UMNO to gain leadership of the UMNO Youth movement. His views were heavily pro-Malay, and he suggested many times in parliament for the NEP target of a 30% stake of the economic action be raised to 40%-50% to benefit the Malays. While he professed that his intentions were to support the Malays who were generally of a more impoverished background, his views were misconstrued as ultra-nationalism and his success was partially, if not intentionally, due to fulminating feelings regarding the Malay identity. In 1982, Suhaimi lost the leadership of UMNO Youth after the fledgling politician Anwar Ibrahim wrested the control of the movement from him by a slim 10-vote majority in a bitterly fought contest. Anwar received 183, compared to Suhaimi's 173, with Hang Tuah Arshad receiving only 3 votes. In 1984, the votes were more in Anwar's favour, 226 as opposed to Suhaimi's 137. However, seeing him as a very real threat to his political career, Anwar removed Suhaimi from the movement despite the ongoing media vilification of Anwar's motivations and accusations that Anwar participated in 'politik wang' (money politics).

Despite this set-back, Suhaimi still managed to become the Deputy Minister of Education. In 1981, he proposed the integration of the education system (at the time, split into national schools, Chinese schools and Tamil schools) so that the Malay, Chinese and Indian children would learn to integrate, resulting in racial harmony. He was lambasted for such a suggestion by Lim Kit Siang of the Democratic Action Party (DAP), who denouncing such a view as "extremist and chauvinistic." Suhaimi defended his views, maintaining that racial integration was more important than catering schools to a particular race, forewarning everyone of racial polarisation in the future. He was rebuked, and the Sedition Act was cited as a threat were he to continue with such a proposal.

== Later political career ==
In 1987, Tengku Razaleigh Hamzah challenged the then Prime Minister Dr. Mahathir Mohamad. In the election, Dr. Mahathir managed to retain his position. However, UMNO was split into two separate entities as Tengku Razaleigh was left unsatisfied with the result. He left the party and went on his own path, founding a new political party called Parti Melayu Semangat 46 in 1989. The number 46 refers to the year UMNO was founded. Suhaimi became the secretary-general of the party, along with other big political names from the media-labelled Team B such as Datuk Rais Yatim, Datuk Mohd Radzi Sheikh Ahmad, Datuk Zainal Abidin Zin, Datuk Manan Othman, Datuk Ibrahim Ali, Datin Paduka Rahmah Othman and Marina Yusof, defected to Semangat 46. However, other key members of Team B notably Tun Musa Hitam, Datuk Shahrir Samad and former Prime Minister Datuk Seri Abdullah Ahmad Badawi decided to remain in Umno, but silently supported Semangat 46 from behind to avoid the media's attention.

Seven years later, Tengku Razaleigh disbanded Semangat 46 and rejoined UMNO, forcing Suhaimi and his other political companions to return to UMNO or retire permanently from politics. Suhaimi rejoined UMNO and he remains active in politics to this day.

=== Recent activity ===
In May 2008, German company GUNT, represented by Datuk Suhaimi Kamaruddin, Marisa Regina Mohd Aris Rizal and Saidatun Nasihah, won against the Cheras firm, MS Instruments Sdn Bhd. The case involved the latter supplying the Education Ministry with imitation products under the guise of the genuine German article.

== Election results ==
Parliament of Malaysia
Year	Constituency	Candidate	Votes	Pct	Opponent(s)	Votes	Pct	Ballots cast	Majority	Turnout
1974	P083 Sepang	Suhaimi Kamaruddin (UMNO)			Zainuddin Karim (PEKEMAS)					
1978	P083 Sepang	Suhaimi Kamaruddin (UMNO)	11,404	54.81%	A. Kalai Chelvan (DAP)	6,446	30.98%		4,958	
1978	P083 Sepang	Suhaimi Kamaruddin (UMNO)	11,404	54.81%	Mohamed Long Said (PAS)	2,955	14.20%		4,958	
1982	P083 Sepang	Suhaimi Kamaruddin (UMNO)	16,105	60.91%	Abdul Jabar Mohamad Yusof (IND)	9,613	36.36%	27,043	6,492	79.67%
1982	P083 Sepang	Suhaimi Kamaruddin (UMNO)	16,105	60.91%	Mohamed Long Said (PAS)	573	2.17%	27,043	6,492	79.67%
1982	P083 Sepang	Suhaimi Kamaruddin (UMNO)	16,105	60.91%	Thai Ah Ko (IND)	148	0.56%	27,043	6,492	79.67%
1990	P095 Sepang	Suhaimi Kamaruddin (S46)	13,492	37.12%	Mohd Sharif Jajang (UMNO)	22,855	62.88%	37,410	9,363	77.01%
1995	P102 Sepang	Suhaimi Kamaruddin (S46)	10,353	28.46%	Seripah Noli Syed Hussin (UMNO)	26,022	71.54%	38,182	15,669	73.33%

== Honours ==
- Malaysia
  - Member of the Order of the Defender of the Realm (AMN) (1972)
- Selangor
  - Knight Commander of the Order of the Crown of Selangor (DPMS) – Dato' (1981)
  - Companion of the Order of the Crown of Selangor (SMS)

== See also ==
- Sepang (federal constituency)
