= Minister of Works (Malaysia) =

Cabinet position of Malaysia

- Menteri Kerja Raya

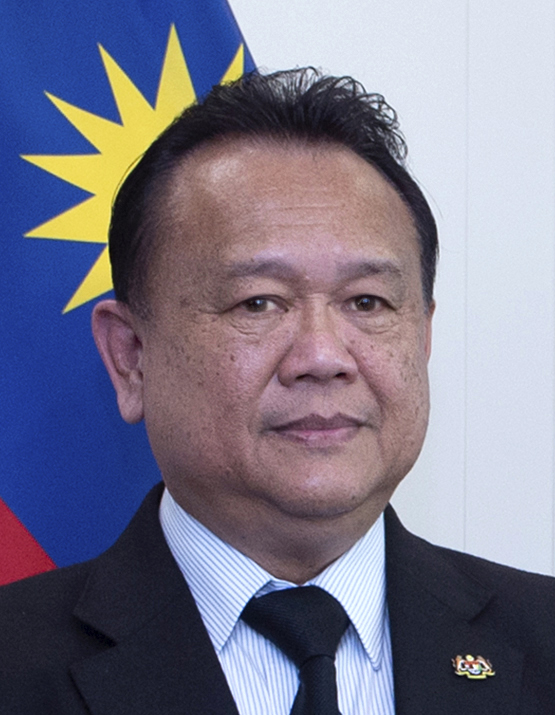
- Incumbent; Alexander Nanta Linggi since 3 December 2022
- Ministry of Works
- Style: Yang Berhormat Menteri (The Honourable Minister)
- Abbreviation: KKR
- Member of: Cabinet of Malaysia
- Reports to: Parliament of Malaysia
- Seat: Kuala Lumpur
- Appointer: Yang di-Pertuan Agong on the recommendation of the Prime Minister of Malaysia
- Formation: 9 August 1955
- First holder: Sardon Jubir
- Deputy: Ahmad Maslan
- Website: www.kkr.gov.my

The current Minister of Works (Malay: Menteri Kerja Raya; Jawi: منتري كرجا راي) has been Alexander Nanta Linggi since 3 December 2022. The Minister has been assisted by Deputy Minister Ahmad Maslan since 12 December 2023. The Minister administers the portfolio through the Ministry of Works.

== List of ministers ==
The following individuals have been appointed as Minister of Works, or any of its precedent titles:

Political party: Alliance Party/BN PH GPS

| Portrait | Name (Birth–Death) Constituency | Political party | Title | Took office | Left office | Deputy Minister | Prime Minister (Cabinet) |
|---|---|---|---|---|---|---|---|
| | Sardon Jubir (1917–1985); MP for Segamat | Alliance (UMNO) | Minister of Works | 9 August 1955 | 1 April 1956 | Vacant | Chief Minister of the Federation of Malaya; Tunku Abdul Rahman |
| | V. T. Sambanthan (1919–1979); MP for Sungei Siput | Alliance (MIC) | Minister of Works, Posts and Telecommunications | 2 April 1956 | 31 December 1971 | Vacant | Tunku Abdul Rahman (I • II • III • IV); Abdul Razak Hussein (I) |
| | Abdul Ghani Gilong (1932–2021); MP for Kinabalu | Alliance (USNO) | Minister of Works and Energy | 1 January 1972 | 4 March 1974 | Vacant | Abdul Razak Hussein (I) |
| | V. Manickavasagam (1926–1979); MP for Pelabuhan Kelang | BN (MIC) | Minister of Works and Transport | 5 September 1974 | 4 March 1976 | Richard Ho Ung Hun | Abdul Razak Hussein (II) |
| | Abdul Ghani Gilong (1932–2021); MP for Kinabalu | BN (USNO) | Minister of Works and Public Amenities | 5 March 1976 | 27 July 1978 | Goh Cheng Teik | Hussein Onn (I) |
| | Lee San Choon (1935–2023); MP for Segamat | BN (MCA) | Minister of Works and Public Amenities | 28 July 1978 | 15 September 1980 | Nik Hussein Wan Abdul Rahman | Hussein Onn (II) |
| | Samy Vellu (1937–2022); MP for Sungai Siput | BN (MIC) | Minister of Works and Public Amenities | 16 September 1980 | 7 June 1983 | Nik Hussein Wan Abdul Rahman (1980–1981); Clarence Elong Mansul (1981); Nik Hussein Wan Abdul Rahman (1981–1983) | Hussein Onn (II); Mahathir Mohamad (I • II) |
| | Samy Vellu (1937–2022); MP for Sungai Siput | BN (MIC) | Minister of Works | 8 June 1983 | 14 June 1989 | Nik Hussein Wan Abdul Rahman (1983–1984); Zainal Abidin Zin (1984–1986); Mustaffa Mohammad (1986–1987); Osu Sukam (1986–1989); Luhat Wan (1987–1989) | Mahathir Mohamad (II • III) |
| | Leo Moggie Irok (b. 1941); MP for Kanowit | BN (PBDS) | Minister of Works | 15 June 1989 | 8 May 1995 | Luhat Wan (1989–1990); Alexander Lee Yu Lung (1989–1990); Kerk Choo Ting (1990–1995); Peter Tinggom Kamarau (1990–1995) | Mahathir Mohamad (III • IV) |
| | Samy Vellu (1937–2022); MP for Sungai Siput | BN (MIC) | Minister of Works | 9 May 1995 | 15 March 2008 | Railey Jeffrey (1995–1999); Mohamed Khaled Nordin (1999–2004); Mohd Zin Mohamed (2004–2008) | Mahathir Mohamad (V • VI); Abdullah Ahmad Badawi (I • II) |
| | Mohd Zin Mohamed (b. 1954); MP for Sepang | BN (UMNO) | Minister of Works | 20 March 2008 | 9 April 2009 | Yong Khoon Seng | Abdullah Ahmad Badawi (III) |
| | Shaziman Abu Mansor (b. 1964); MP for Tampin | BN (UMNO) | Minister of Works | 10 April 2009 | 15 May 2013 | Yong Khoon Seng | Najib Razak (I) |
| | Fadillah Yusof (b. 1962); MP for Petra Jaya | BN (PBB) | Minister of Works | 16 May 2013 | 9 May 2018 | Rosnah Shirlin | Najib Razak (II) |
| | Baru Bian (b. 1958); MP for Selangau | PH (PKR) | Minister of Works | 2 July 2018 | 24 February 2020 | Mohd Anuar Mohd Tahir | Mahathir Mohamad (VII) |
| | Fadillah Yusof (b. 1962) (Senior Minister); MP for Petra Jaya | GPS (PBB) | Senior Minister of Works | 10 March 2020 | 24 November 2022 | Shahruddin Md Salleh (2020); Eddin Syazlee Shith (2020–2021); Arthur Joseph Kurup (2021–2022) | Muhyiddin Yassin (I); Ismail Sabri Yaakob (I) |
| | Alexander Nanta Linggi (b. 1958); MP for Kapit | GPS (PBB) | Minister of Works | 3 December 2022 | Incumbent | Abdul Rahman Mohamad (2022–2023); Ahmad Maslan (2023–current) | Anwar Ibrahim (I) |
