= Mohd Zin Mohamed =

Malaysian politician

Yang Berbahagia Dato' Sri Mohd Zin Mohamed SSAP DPMS PJK
- محمد زين بن محمد

Minister of Works
- In office 19 March – 8 April 2008
- Monarch: Mizan Zainal Abidin
- Prime Minister: Abdullah Ahmad Badawi
- Deputy: Yong Khoon Seng
- Preceded by: Samy Vellu
- Succeeded by: Shaziman Abu Mansor
- Constituency: Sepang

Deputy Minister of Works
- In office 27 March 2004 – 19 March 2008
- Monarchs: Sirajuddin (2004–2006); Mizan Zainal Abidin (2006–2008)
- Prime Minister: Abdullah Ahmad Badawi
- Minister: Samy Vellu
- Preceded by: Mohamed Khaled Nordin
- Succeeded by: Yong Khoon Seng
- Constituency: Sepang

Member of the Malaysian Parliament for Sepang
- In office 21 March 2004 – 5 May 2013
- Preceded by: Seripah Noli Syed Hussin (BN–UMNO)
- Succeeded by: Mohamed Hanipa Maidin (PR–PAS)
- Majority: 18,837 (2004); 4,849 (2008)

Member of the Malaysian Parliament for Shah Alam
- In office 29 November 1999 – 21 March 2004
- Preceded by: Salamon Selamat (BN–UMNO)
- Succeeded by: Abdul Aziz Shamsuddin (BN–UMNO)
- Majority: 1,440 (1999)

Personal details
- Born: Mohd Zin bin Mohamed; 28 March 1953 (age 73) Muar, Johor, Federation of Malaya (now Malaysia)
- Party: United Malays National Organisation (UMNO)
- Other political affiliations: Barisan Nasional (BN); Perikatan Nasional (PN); Muafakat Nasional (MN)
- Spouse: Azlina Ahmad
- Children: 5
- Education: Bradley University
- Occupation: Politician

Mohd Zin bin Mohamed (Jawi: محمد زين بن محمد; born 28 March 1953) is a Malaysian politician who served as Minister of Works in the Barisan Nasional (BN) administration under Prime Minister Abdullah Ahmad Badawi from March to April 2008 as well as Member of Parliament (MP) for Sepang from March 2004 to May 2013, Shah Alam from November 1999 to March 2004, Member of the Selangor State Legislative Assembly (MLA) for Sungai Renggam from April 1995 to November 1999. He is a member of the United Malays National Organisation (UMNO), a component party of Barisan Nasional (BN) coalitions.

== Early life ==
Mohd Zin was born in Muar, Johor and obtained his Diploma of Civil Engineering from UiTM in 1977. He then went on to work with PKNS before continuing his studies in Bradley University, Peoria, Illinois, USA. In 1980, he furthered his study in the same university to obtain his master's degree.

== Political career ==
Mohd Zin firstly became the branch chairperson of the Section 8 Shah Alam UMNO branch (1986–1994), the youth wing chief of UMNO Shah Alam division (1988–1994) and later became the treasurer for Selangor UMNO Youth as well as simultaneously serving as member of the national UMNO Youth wing executive council.

In 2001, he was elected as the Deputy Divisional Chief of UMNO Shah Alam and later became the pro tem divisional chairman of both UMNO Kota Raja and later UMNO Sepang divisions.

He entered the federal parliament in the 2004 election, winning the seat of Sepang. During his first term in parliament, he was appointed as Deputy Minister for Works. After his re-election in 2008, he became the Minister for Works, replacing the long-serving Samy Vellu. However, in April 2009, Mohd Zin was dropped from the Cabinet by incoming Prime Minister Najib Tun Razak, and was replaced in his ministry by Shaziman Abu Mansor. In November 2009, he was appointed as the Chairman of Keretapi Tanah Melayu, peninsular Malaysia's main rail operator.

In the 2013 election, the Barisan Nasional coalition suffered heavy losses in the state of Selangor, and Mohd Zin lost his parliamentary seat to Mohamed Hanipa Maidin of the Pan-Malaysian Islamic Party (PAS).

== Election results ==
Selangor State Legislative Assembly
Year	Constituency	Candidate	Votes	Pct	Opponent(s)	Votes	Pct	Ballot casts	Majority	Turnout
1995	N36 Sungai Renggam	Mohd Zin Mohamed (UMNO)	19,825	84.20%	Wan Mohamad Halim Wan Ahmad Tajuddin (S46)	3,720	15.80%	23,965	16,105	73.70%

Parliament of Malaysia
Year	Constituency	Candidate	Votes	Pct	Opponent(s)	Votes	Pct	Ballot casts	Majority	Turnout
1999	P098 Shah Alam	Mohd Zin Mohamed (UMNO)	35,851	51.02%	Mohamad Ezam Mohd Nor (keADILan)	34,411	48.98%	71,477	1,440	77.07%
2004	P113 Sepang	Mohd Zin Mohamed (UMNO)	30,755	72.07%	Mohamed Makki Ahmad (PAS)	11,918	27.93%	43,054	18,837	73.85%
2008	P113 Sepang	Mohd Zin Mohamed (UMNO)	26,381	55.06%	Mohamed Makki Ahmad (PAS)	21,532	44.94%	49,137	4,849	79.20%
2013	P113 Sepang	Mohd Zin Mohamed (UMNO)	35,658	48.36%	Mohamed Hanipa Maidin (PAS)	36,800	49.91%	75,135	1,142	89.06%

== Honours ==
- Pahang
  - Knight Grand Companion of the Order of Sultan Ahmad Shah of Pahang (SSAP) – Dato' Sri (2008)
- Selangor
  - Knight Commander of the Order of the Crown of Selangor (DPMS) – Dato' (2001)
  - Recipient of the Meritorious Service Medal (PJK) (1993)
