= Mohamed Hanipa Maidin =

Malaysian politician

- محمد حنيفة بن ميدين

Deputy Minister in the Prime Minister's Department (Legal Affairs)
- In office 2 July 2018 – 24 February 2020
- Monarchs: Muhammad V (2018–2019); Abdullah (2019–2020)
- Prime Minister: Mahathir Mohamad
- Minister: Liew Vui Keong
- Preceded by: Razali Ibrahim
- Succeeded by: Eddin Syazlee Shith

Member of the Malaysian Parliament for Sepang
- In office 5 May 2013 – 19 November 2022
- Preceded by: Mohd Zin Mohamed (BN–UMNO)
- Succeeded by: Aiman Athirah Sabu (PH–AMANAH)
- Majority: 1,142 (2013); 18,705 (2018)

Personal details
- Born: Mohamed Hanipa bin Maidin; 1969 (age 56–57) Batu Pahat, Johor, Malaysia
- Party: Malaysian Islamic Party (PAS) (–2015); National Trust Party (AMANAH) (since 2015)
- Other political affiliations: Angkatan Perpaduan Ummah (APU) (–1996); Barisan Alternatif (BA) (1998–2004); Pakatan Rakyat (PR) (2008–2015); Pakatan Harapan (PH) (since 2015)
- Education: International Islamic University of Malaysia
- Occupation: Politician
- Profession: Barrister

Mohamed Hanipa bin Maidin (Jawi: محمد حنيفة بن ميدين) is a Malaysian politician and barrister who served as the Deputy Minister in the Prime Minister's Department in charge of legal affairs in the Pakatan Harapan (PH) administration under former Prime Minister Mahathir Mohamad and former Minister Liew Vui Keong from July 2018 to the collapse of the PH administration in February 2020 and the Member of Parliament (MP) for Sepang from May 2013 to November 2022. He is a member of the National Trust Party (AMANAH), a component party of the PH coalition. and was a member of Malaysian Islamic Party (PAS). He and other progressive PAS leaders referred to as the G18 were ousted at the 2015 PAS Muktamar. This led them to launch Gerakan Harapan Baru (GHB), which took over the dormant Malaysian Workers' Party, after their attempt to form a new party called Parti Progresif Islam (PPI) was rejected by the Home Affairs Ministry. GHB was later rebranded as AMANAH with Mohamad Sabu as its 1st President.

Hanipa is a barrister by profession. He married Rohani Rohmat.

== Election results ==
Parliament of Malaysia
Year	Constituency	Candidate	Votes	Pct	Opponent(s)	Votes	Pct	Ballots cast	Majority	Turnout
1995	P139 Kota Tinggi	Mohamed Hanipa Maidin (PAS)	3,007	7.56%	Syed Hamid Albar (UMNO)	36,776	92.44%	41,577	33,769	78.83%
1999	P131 Parit Sulong	Mohamed Hanipa Maidin (PAS)	13,603	30.32%	Ruhanie Ahmad (UMNO)	31,260	69.68%	46,006	17,657	73.95%
2004	P150 Batu Pahat	Mohamed Hanipa Maidin (PAS)	9,880	20.22%	Junaidy Abd Wahab (UMNO)	38,982	79.78%	50,234	29,102	73.43%
2008	P095 Tanjong Karang	Mohamed Hanipa Maidin (PAS)	12,253	42.18%	Noh Omar (UMNO)	16,073	55.32%	29,052	3,820	79.83%
2013	P113 Sepang	Mohamed Hanipa Maidin (PAS)	36,800	49.91%	Mohd Zin Mohamed (UMNO)	35,658	48.36%	75,135	1,142	89.06%
2013	P113 Sepang	Mohamed Hanipa Maidin (PAS)	36,800	49.91%	Suhaimi Mohd Ghazali (IND)	962	1.30%	75,135	1,142	89.06%
2013	P113 Sepang	Mohamed Hanipa Maidin (PAS)	36,800	49.91%	Hanapiah Mohamad (IND)	315	0.43%	75,135	1,142	89.06%
2018	P113 Sepang	Mohamed Hanipa Maidin (AMANAH)	46,740	51.56%	Marsum Paing (UMNO)	28,035	30.92%	92,087	18,705	88.11%
2018	P113 Sepang	Mohamed Hanipa Maidin (AMANAH)	46,740	51.56%	Sabirin Marsono (PAS)	15,882	17.52%	92,087	18,705	88.11%

Parliament of Malaysia
Preceded by Mohd. Zin Mohamed	Member of Parliament for Sepang; 5 May 2013–present	Incumbent
