= Sungai Renggam (state constituency) =

Selangor constituency

Defunct state constituency
- Legislature: Selangor State Legislative Assembly
- Constituency created: 1994
- Constituency abolished: 2004
- First contested: 1995
- Last contested: 1999

Sungai Renggam was a state constituency in Selangor, Malaysia, that was represented in the Selangor State Legislative Assembly from 1995 to 2004.

The state constituency was created in the 1994 redistribution and was mandated to return a single member to the Selangor State Legislative Assembly under the first past the post voting system.

== History ==
It was abolished in 2004 when it was redistributed.

=== Representation history ===
Members of the Legislative Assembly for Sungai Renggam
Assembly	No	Years	Member	Party
Constituency split from Subang
9th	N36	1995–1999	Mohd Zin Mohamed	BN (UMNO)
10th	N36	1999–2004	Ahmad Nawawi M. Zin	BN (UMNO)
Constituency renamed to Kota Anggerik

== Election results ==
Selangor state election, 1999
Party	Candidate	Votes	%	∆%
BN	Ahmad Nawawi M. Zin	14,898	55.37	▼28.83
PAS	Omar Hashim	12,009	44.63	▲44.63
Total valid votes		26,907	100.00	
Total rejected ballots		403		
Unreturned ballots		21		
Turnout		27,331	76.52	▲2.82
Registered electors		35,718		
Majority		2,889	10.74	▼57.66
BN hold		Swing		

Selangor state election, 1995
Party	Candidate	Votes	%
BN	Mohd Zin Mohamed	19,825	84.20
S46	Wan Mohamad Halim Wan Ahmad Tajuddin	3,720	15.80
Total valid votes		23,545	100.00
Total rejected ballots		420	
Unreturned ballots		0	
Turnout		23,965	73.70
Registered electors		32,518	
Majority		16,105	68.40
This was a new constituency created.
