= Semerah (state constituency) =

Political subdivision in Malaysia

Semerah (N17)
Johor constituency

State constituency
- Legislature: Johor State Legislative Assembly
MLA
Mohd Fared Mohd Khalid
BN
- Constituency created: 1984
- First contested: 1986
- Last contested: 2026

Demographics
- Population (2020): 46,254
- Electors (2026): 47,431
- Area (km²): 165

Semerah is a state constituency in Johor, Malaysia, that is represented in the Johor State Legislative Assembly.

The state constituency was first contested in 1986 and is mandated to return a single Assemblyman to the Johor State Legislative Assembly under the first-past-the-post voting system.

== Demographics ==
As of 2020, Semerah has a population of 46,254 people.

Ethnic breakdown of Semerah's electorate as of 2022
1. Malay (75.3%)
2. Chinese (23.3%)
3. Other ethnicities (1.00%)
4. Indian (0.50%)

== History ==
=== Polling districts ===
According to the gazette issued on 2 July 2026, the Semerah constituency has a total of 26 polling districts.

State constituency	Polling Districts	Code	Location
Semerah（N17）	Parit Nibong Darat	147/17/01	SK Seri Utama
Semerah（N17）	Batu Puteh	147/17/02	SK Seri Ma'amor
Semerah（N17）	Separap	147/17/03	SK Seri Separap
Semerah（N17）	Kampong Batu Puteh	147/17/04	SK Seri Jasa Sepakat
Semerah（N17）	Semerah	147/17/05	SK Peserian
Semerah（N17）	Bandar Semerah	147/17/06	SMK Semerah
Semerah（N17）	Lubok	147/17/07	SK Lubok
Semerah（N17）	Parit Kuda	147/17/08	SK Seri Pengkalan
Semerah（N17）	Parit Besar	147/17/09	SK Seri Sekawan Desa
Semerah（N17）	Gambut	147/17/10	SK Gambut
Semerah（N17）	Bagan	147/17/11	SK Bagan
Semerah（N17）	Mamapan	147/17/12	SK Penghulu Salleh
Semerah（N17）	Kampong Bintang	147/17/13	SMK Dato Onn
Semerah（N17）	Simpang Lima	147/17/14	SA Seri Muafakat
Semerah（N17）	Sungai Kajang	147/17/15	SK Sungai Kajang
Semerah（N17）	Peserai	147/17/16	SK Peserai
Semerah（N17）	Shahbandar	147/17/17	SK Bandar
Semerah（N17）	Jalan Jenang	147/17/18	Kwong Shiew Association
Semerah（N17）	Pasar	147/17/19	SK Bandar
Semerah（N17）	Jalan Engan	147/17/20	SK Bandar
Semerah（N17）	Panchoran Ayer	147/17/21	SA Bandar Batu Pahat
Semerah（N17）	Kampong Pantai Barat	147/17/22	OUM Pusat Pembelajaran Batu Pahat
Semerah（N17）	Kampong Pantai Timor	147/17/23	SA Bandar Batu Pahat
Semerah（N17）	Kampong Pantai	147/17/24	Tabika Perpaduan Rumah Pangsa Pantai
Semerah（N17）	Parit Maimon	147/17/25	SK Seri Laksana
Semerah（N17）	Parit Puasa	147/17/26	SA Seri Laksana

=== Representation history ===
Members of the Legislative Assembly for Semerah
Assembly	No	Years	Member	Party
Constituency created from Peserai and Sri Menanti
7th	N14	1986-1990	Cheang Lu Kiang (曾鲁強)	BN (MCA)
8th	N14	1990-1995	Tan Teck Poh @ Tan Ah Too (陈德波)	BN (MCA)
9th	N14	1995-1999	Tan Teck Poh @ Tan Ah Too (陈德波)	BN (MCA)
10th	N14	1999-2004	Tan Teck Poh @ Tan Ah Too (陈德波)	BN (MCA)
11th	N17	2004-2008	Ariss Samsudin	BN (UMNO)
12th	N17	2008-2013	Ariss Samsudin	BN (UMNO)
13th	N17	2013–2018	Mohd Ismail Roslan	BN (UMNO)
14th	N17	2018-2022	Mohd Khuzzan Abu Bakar	PH (PKR)
15th	N17	2022–2026	Mohd Fared Mohd Khalid	BN (UMNO)
16th	N17	2026–present	Mohd Fared Mohd Khalid	BN (UMNO)

== Election results ==
Johor state election, 2026
Party	Candidate	Votes	%	∆%
BN	Mohd Fared Mohd Khalid	23,206	66.96	▲22.03
PH	Mohd Khuzzan Abu Bakar	7,543	21.77	▲21.77
PN	Halim Kepol	3,906	11.27	▼19.18
Total valid votes		34,655	100.00	
Total rejected ballots		386		
Unreturned ballots		57		
Turnout		35,098	74.00	▲12.63
Registered electors		47,431		
Majority		15,663	45.20	▲30.72
BN hold		Swing		?

Johor state election, 2022
Party	Candidate	Votes	%	∆%
BN	Mohd Fared Mohd Khalid	12,542	44.93	▲2.09
PN	Ariss Samsudin	8,501	30.45	▲30.45
PKR	Mohd Khuzzan Abu Bakar	6,265	22.44	▼20.40
PEJUANG	Mahdzir Ibrahim	361	1.29	▲1.29
PUTRA	Kamarolzaman Mohd Jidi	247	0.88	▲0.88
Total valid votes		27,916	100.00	
Total rejected ballots		543		
Unreturned ballots		161		
Turnout		28,620	61.36	▼22.90
Registered electors		46,640		
Majority		4,041	14.48	▲14.47
BN gain from PKR		Swing		?

Johor state election, 2018
Party	Candidate	Votes	%	∆%
PKR	Mohd Khuzzan Abu Bakar	12,619	42.84	▼2.09
BN	Mohd Ismail Roslan	12,521	42.51	▼12.55
PAS	Adnan Othman	4,314	14.65	▲14.65
Total valid votes		29,454	100.00	
Total rejected ballots		405		
Unreturned ballots		102		
Turnout		29,961	84.26	▼1.68
Registered electors		35,557		
Majority		98	0.33	▼9.79
PKR gain from BN		Swing		-

Johor state election, 2013
Party	Candidate	Votes	%	∆%
BN	Mohd Ismail Roslan	14,404	55.06	▼6.88
PKR	Md Ysahrudin Kusni	11,755	44.94	▲6.88
Total valid votes		26,159	100.00	
Total rejected ballots		446		
Unreturned ballots		78		
Turnout		26,683	85.95	▲9.53
Registered electors		31,046		
Majority		2,649	10.13	▼13.76
BN hold		Swing		

Johor state election, 2008
Party	Candidate	Votes	%	∆%
BN	Ariss Samsudin	13,156	61.95	▼13.75
PKR	Muhamad Hasmi Hashim	8,082	38.05	▲38.05
Total valid votes		21,238	100.00	
Total rejected ballots		545		
Unreturned ballots		45		
Turnout		21,828	76.42	▲3.23
Registered electors		28,563		
Majority		5,074	23.89	▼27.50
BN hold		Swing		

Johor state election, 2004
Party	Candidate	Votes	%	∆%
BN	Ariss Samsudin	15,715	75.69	▲75.69
PAS	Mazlan Aliman	5,046	24.31	▼11.80
Total valid votes		20,761	100.00	
Total rejected ballots		494		
Unreturned ballots		35		
Turnout		21,290	73.19	▲0.23
Registered electors		29,088		
Majority		10,669	51.39	▲23.60
BN hold		Swing		

Johor state election, 1999
Party	Candidate	Votes	%	∆%
BN	Tan Teck Poh	14,241	63.89	▼8.65
PAS	Khairuddin Abdul Rahim	8,048	36.11	▲36.11
Total valid votes		22,289	100.00	
Total rejected ballots		730		
Unreturned ballots		14		
Turnout		23,033	72.96	▼0.57
Registered electors		31,570		
Majority		6,193	27.79	▼17.30
BN hold		Swing		

Johor state election, 1995
Party	Candidate	Votes	%	∆%
BN	Tan Teck Poh	15,055	72.54	▲20.15
S46	Othman Tahir	5,698	27.46	▼20.15
Total valid votes		20,753	100.00	
Total rejected ballots		797		
Unreturned ballots		376		
Turnout		21,926	73.53	▼0.91
Registered electors		29,818		
Majority		9,357	45.09	▲40.29
BN hold		Swing		

Johor state election, 1990
Party	Candidate	Votes	%	∆%
BN	Tan Teck Poh	11,377	52.40	▼6.96
S46	Othman Tahir	10,336	47.60	▲47.60
Total valid votes		21,713	100.00	
Total rejected ballots		1,004		
Unreturned ballots		24		
Turnout		22,741	74.44	▲2.37
Registered electors		30,548		
Majority		1,041	4.79	▼21.55
BN hold		Swing		

Johor state election, 1986
Party	Candidate	Votes	%
BN	Chang Lu Kiang	11,959	59.36
DAP	Chia Teo Seng	6,651	33.01
PAS	Mahmood Bakar	1,536	7.62
Total valid votes		20,146	100.00
Total rejected ballots		469	
Unreturned ballots		0	
Turnout		20,615	72.08
Registered electors		28,601	
Majority		5,308	26.35
This was a new constituency created.
