= Shahruddin Md Salleh =

Malaysian politician

Yang Berbahagia Datuk Shahruddin Md Salleh PMW KMN
- شهرالدين مد صالح

Deputy Minister of Works
- In office 10 March 2020 – 4 June 2020
- Monarch: Abdullah
- Prime Minister: Muhyiddin Yassin
- Minister: Fadillah Yusof
- Preceded by: Mohd Anuar Mohd Tahir
- Succeeded by: Eddin Syazlee Shith
- Constituency: Sri Gading

Deputy Minister of Federal Territories
- In office 2 July 2018 – 24 February 2020
- Monarchs: Muhammad V (2018–2019); Abdullah (2019–2020)
- Prime Minister: Mahathir Mohamad
- Minister: Khalid Abdul Samad
- Preceded by: Loga Bala Mohan Jaganathan
- Succeeded by: Edmund Santhara Kumar Ramanaidu
- Constituency: Sri Gading

1st Secretary-General of the Malaysian United Indigenous Party
- In office 2 November 2016 – 27 September 2018
- President: Muhyiddin Yassin
- Preceded by: Position established
- Succeeded by: Marzuki Yahya

Chairman of the Malaysian Institute of Translation and Books
- In office 1 February 2010 – 7 October 2016
- Minister: Muhyiddin Yassin (Minister, 2010–2015); Idris Jusoh (Second Minister, 2013–2015); Mahdzir Khalid (Minister, 2015–2016)
- Succeeded by: Budiman Mohd Zohdi

Member of the Malaysian Parliament for Sri Gading
- In office 9 May 2018 – 19 November 2022
- Preceded by: Aziz Kaprawi (BN–UMNO)
- Succeeded by: Aminolhuda Hassan (PH–AMANAH)
- Majority: 3,288 (2018)

Member of the Johor State Legislative Assembly for Jorak
- In office 8 March 2008 – 9 May 2018
- Preceded by: Samat Aripin (BN–UMNO)
- Succeeded by: Najib Lep (PAS)
- Majority: 4,604 (2008); 3,726 (2013)

Faction represented in Dewan Rakyat
- 2018–2020: Pakatan Harapan
- 2020: Malaysian United Indigenous Party
- 2020–2021: Independent
- 2021–2022: Homeland Fighters Party

Faction represented in Johor State Legislative Assembly
- 2008–2016: Barisan Nasional
- 2016–2017: Independent
- 2017–2018: Malaysian United Indigenous Party

Personal details
- Born: Shahruddin bin Md Salleh; 15 May 1956 (age 70) Simpang Renggam, Johor, Federation of Malaya (now Malaysia)
- Citizenship: Malaysian
- Party: United Malays National Organisation (UMNO) (2008–2016); Malaysian United Indigenous Party (BERSATU) (2016–2020); Independent (2020); Homeland Fighters Party (PEJUANG) (since 2020)
- Other political affiliations: Barisan Nasional (BN) (2008-2016); Pakatan Harapan (PH) (2017–2020, aligned:2020–2022); Perikatan Nasional (PN) (2020); Gerakan Tanah Air (GTA) (since 2022)
- Occupation: Politician

Shahruddin bin Md Salleh (Jawi: شهرالدين بن مد صالح) is a Malaysian politician who served as the Deputy Minister of Works in the Perikatan Nasional (PN) administration under Prime Minister Muhyiddin Yassin and Minister Fadillah Yusof from March 2020 to his resignation in June 2020, Deputy Minister of Federal Territories in the Pakatan Harapan (PH) administration under former Prime Minister Mahathir Mohamad and former Minister Khalid Abdul Samad from July 2018 to the collapse of the PH administration in February 2020, Chairman of the Malaysian Institute of Translation and Books (IBTM) from February 2010 to his removal from the position in October 2016, Member of Parliament (MP) for Sri Gading from May 2018 to November 2022 and the Member of the Johor State Legislative Assembly (MLA) for Jorak from March 2008 to May 2018. He was also political secretary to Muhyiddin. He is a member and was a State Chairman of Johor of the Homeland Fighters Party (PEJUANG) before October 2022 and was a member and 1st Secretary-General of the Malaysian United Indigenous Party (BERSATU), a component party of the ruling PN coalition and former component party of the PH opposition coalition and member of the United Malay National Organisation (UMNO), a component party of the Barisan Nasional (BN) coalition.

On 2 June 2020, only three months after PN swept into power in March, he expressed his readiness to resign as the Deputy Minister of Works to "save" his party, BERSATU which was split into two factions led by former party chairman and former Prime Minister Mahathir Mohamad as well as party President and Prime Minister Muhyiddin respectively who were embroiled in a political tussle. Two days later on 4 June 2020, he officially resigned from his position as the Deputy Minister of Works. However, a picture of a letter sent to Muhyiddin stating that he would remain a supporter of the government as a backbench MP was leaked online. Despite this, he later met with Mahathir who is allied with the opposition coalition PH. It was unclear whether Shahruddin supports the PN or PH coalition, with Shahruddin stating that he would address the matter via social media in the future. On 19 July 2020, his BERSATU membership was terminated after he had issued a notice to change the position of his seat in the Dewan Rakyat from the government bloc to the opposition bloc.

== Election results ==
Parliament of Malaysia
Year	Constituency	Candidate	Votes	Pct	Opponent(s)	Votes	Pct	Ballots cast	Majority	Turnout
2018	P149 Sri Gading	Shahruddin Md Salleh (BERSATU)	21,511	48.58%	Ab Aziz Kaprawi (UMNO)	18,223	41.15%	45,193	3,288	86.71%
2018	P149 Sri Gading	Shahruddin Md Salleh (BERSATU)	21,511	48.58%	M. Ash'ari Sidon (PAS)	4,548	10.27%	45,193	3,288	86.71%

Johor State Legislative Assembly
Year	Constituency	Candidate	Votes	Pct	Opponent(s)	Votes	Pct	Ballots cast	Majority	Turnout
2008	N08 Jorak	Shahruddin Md Salleh (UMNO)	10,097	63.21%	Othman Hashim (PAS)	5,493	34.39%	15,974	4,604	75.48%
2013	N08 Jorak	Shahruddin Md Salleh (UMNO)	12,663	57.43%	Nor Hayati Bachok (PAS)	8,937	40.53%	22,049	3,726	87.10%
2022	N26 Machap	Shahruddin Md Salleh (PEJUANG)	465	2.39%	Onn Hafiz Ghazi (UMNO)	11,029	56.64%	19,473	6,543	57.67%
2022	N26 Machap	Shahruddin Md Salleh (PEJUANG)	465	2.39%	Azlisham Azhar (PAS)	4,486	23.04%	19,473	6,543	57.67%
2022	N26 Machap	Shahruddin Md Salleh (PEJUANG)	465	2.39%	Sangaran Rawisandran (MUDA)	3,493	17.94%	19,473	6,543	57.67%

== Honours ==
=== Honours of Malaysia ===
- Malaysia
  - Officer of the Order of the Defender of the Realm (KMN) (2014)
- Federal Territory (Malaysia)
  - Commander of the Order of the Territorial Crown (PMW) – Datuk (2010)
