= Mohd Fared Mohd Khalid =

Malaysian politician and lawyer

Yang Berhormat Tuan Mohd Fared Mohd Khalid MLA
- محمد فريد محمد خالد

Member of the Johor State Executive Council (Islamic Religious Affairs)
- Incumbent
- Assumed office 26 March 2022
- Monarch: Ibrahim Iskandar
- Menteri Besar: Onn Hafiz Ghazi
- Preceded by: Tosrin Jarvanthi
- Constituency: Semerah

Member of the Johor State Legislative Assembly for Semerah
- Incumbent
- Assumed office 12 March 2022
- Preceded by: Mohd Khuzzan Abu Bakar (PH–PKR)
- Majority: 4,041 (2022)

Personal details
- Born: Mohd Fared bin Mohd Khalid Johor, Malaysia
- Citizenship: Malaysian
- Party: United Malays National Organisation (UMNO)
- Other political affiliations: Barisan Nasional (BN)
- Education: National University of Malaysia
- Occupation: Politician
- Profession: Lawyer

Mohd Fared bin Mohd Khalid is a Malaysian politician and lawyer who has served as Member of the Johor State Executive Council (EXCO) in the Barisan Nasional (BN) state administration under Menteri Besar Onn Hafiz Ghazi and Member of the Johor State Legislative Assembly (MLA) for Semerah since March 2022. He is a member of the United Malays National Organisation (UMNO), a component party of the BN coalition.

== Election results ==
Johor State Legislative Assembly
| Year | Constituency | Candidate | Votes | Pct | Opponent(s) | Votes | Pct | Ballots cast | Majority | Turnout% |
|---|---|---|---|---|---|---|---|---|---|---|
| 2022 | N17 Semerah | Mohd Fared Mohd Khalid (UMNO) | 12,542 | 44.93% | Ariss Samsudin (BERSATU) | 8,501 | 30.45% | 27,916 | 4,041 | 59.85% |
| 2022 | N17 Semerah | Mohd Fared Mohd Khalid (UMNO) | 12,542 | 44.93% | Mohd Khuzzan Abu Bakar (PKR) | 6,265 | 22.44% | 27,916 | 4,041 | 59.85% |
| 2022 | N17 Semerah | Mohd Fared Mohd Khalid (UMNO) | 12,542 | 44.93% | Mahdzir Ibrahim (PEJUANG) | 361 | 1.29% | 27,916 | 4,041 | 59.85% |
| 2022 | N17 Semerah | Mohd Fared Mohd Khalid (UMNO) | 12,542 | 44.93% | Kamarolzaman Mohd Jidin (PUTRA) | 247 | 0.88% | 27,916 | 4,041 | 59.85% |
| 2026 | N17 Semerah | Mohd Fared Mohd Khalid (UMNO) | 23,206 | 66.96% | Mohd Khuzzan Abu Bakar (PKR) | 7,543 | 21.77% | 35,098 | 15,663 | 74.00% |
| 2026 | N17 Semerah | Mohd Fared Mohd Khalid (UMNO) | 23,206 | 66.96% | Halim Kepol (PAS) | 3,906 | 11.27% | 35,098 | 15,663 | 74.00% |
