= Parit Raja (state constituency) =

Parit Raja (N22)
Johor constituency

State constituency
- Legislature: Johor State Legislative Assembly
MLA
Nor Rashidah Ramli
BN
- Constituency created: 1974
- First contested: 1974
- Last contested: 2026

Demographics
- Population (2020): 94,504
- Electors (2026): 38,159
- Area (km²): 153

Parit Raja is a state constituency in Johor, Malaysia, that is represented in the Johor State Legislative Assembly.

The state constituency was first contested in 1974 and is mandated to return a single Assemblyman to the Johor State Legislative Assembly under the first-past-the-post voting system.

== Demographics ==
As of 2020, Parit Raja has a population of 94,504 people.

Ethnic breakdown of Parit Raja's electorate as of 2026
1. Malay (74.9%)
2. Chinese (22.6%)
3. Indian (1.70%)
4. Other ethnicities (0.80%)

== History ==
=== Polling districts ===
According to the gazette issued on 2 July 2026, the Parit Raja constituency has a total of 17 polling districts.

State constituency	Polling Districts	Code	Location
Parit Raja（N22）	Taman Sri Saga	149/22/01	SMK Munshi Sulaiman
Parit Raja（N22）	Broleh Selatan	149/22/02	Blok Bistari, Institut Pendidikan Guru, Kampus Tun Hussein Onn Batu Pahat
Parit Raja（N22）	Batu Enam	149/22/03	SJK (C) Panchor
Parit Raja（N22）	Sri Gading	149/22/04	SK Sri Gading
Parit Raja（N22）	Bandar Sri Gading	149/22/05	SJK (C) Chong Hwa Sri Gading
Parit Raja（N22）	Tanjong Sembrong	149/22/06	SK Tg Semberong
Parit Raja（N22）	Bandar Parit Raja Utara	149/22/07	SMK Tun Ismail
Parit Raja（N22）	Bandar Parit Raja Selatan	149/22/08	SK Parit Raja
Parit Raja（N22）	Pintas Puding	149/22/09	SK Pintas Puding
Parit Raja（N22）	Parit Jelutong	149/22/10	SK Jelutong
Parit Raja（N22）	Pintas Raya	149/22/11	SK Pintas Raya
Parit Raja（N22）	Sri Gading Estate	149/22/12	SJK (T) Ladang Sri Gading
Parit Raja（N22）	Parit Kampong Baru	149/22/13	SK Seri Aman
Parit Raja（N22）	Parit Sri Pandan	149/22/14	SK Seri Pandan
Parit Raja（N22）	Parit Lapis Sempadan	149/22/15	SK Seri Puleh
Parit Raja（N22）	Parit Raja	149/22/16	SMA Parit Raja
Parit Raja（N22）	Parit Sri Menanti	149/22/17	SK Seri Timbul

=== Representation history ===
Members of the Legislative Assembly for Parit Raja
Assembly	No	Years	Member	Party
Constituency created from Ayer Hitam and Tanjong Sembrong
4th	N21	1974-1978	Yusak Nawawi	BN (UMNO)
5th	N21	1978-1982	Sharif Lassim	BN (UMNO)
6th	N21	1982-1986	Sharif Lassim	BN (UMNO)
7th	N20	1986-1988	Syed Zain Edros Al-Shahab	BN (UMNO)
7th	N20	1988-1990	Mohd. Yasin Kamari	BN (UMNO)
8th	N20	1990-1995	Zahar Bachik	BN (UMNO)
9th	N20	1995-1999	Zahar Bachik	BN (UMNO)
10th	N20	1999-2004	Ali Shikh Ahmad	BN (UMNO)
11th	N22	2004-2008	Ab Aziz Kaprawi	BN (UMNO)
12th	N22	2008-2013	Ab Aziz Kaprawi	BN (UMNO)
13th	N22	2013-2018	Azizah Zakaria	BN (UMNO)
14th	N22	2018-2022	Nor Rashidah Ramli	BN (UMNO)
15th	N22	2022–2026	Nor Rashidah Ramli	BN (UMNO)
16th	N22	2026–present	Nor Rashidah Ramli	BN (UMNO)

== Election results ==
Johor state election, 2026
Party	Candidate	Votes	%	∆%
BN	Nor Rashidah Ramli	19,752	69.20	▲19.63
PH	Shazwan Zdainal Abidin	6,176	21.64	▲21.64
PN	Mohamed Maliki Mohamed Rapiee	2,617	9.17	▼20,73
Total valid votes		28,545	100.00	
Total rejected ballots		248		
Unreturned ballots		53		
Turnout		28,846	75.59	▲14.70
Registered electors		38,159		
Majority		13,576	47.56	▲27.89
BN hold		Swing		

Johor state election, 2022
Party	Candidate	Votes	%	∆%
BN	Nor Rashidah Ramli	10,634	49.57	▲5.29
PN	Zulkifli Mat Daud	6,415	29.90	▲29.90
MUDA	Fikri Musa	3,893	18.15	▲18.15
PEJUANG	Lateed Mahrani	510	2.38	▲2.38
Total valid votes		21,452	100.00	
Total rejected ballots		341		
Unreturned ballots		164		
Turnout		21,957	60.89	▼25.58
Registered electors		36,059		
Majority		4,219	19.67	▲16.71
BN hold		Swing		

Johor state election, 2018
Party	Candidate	Votes	%	∆%
BN	Rashidah Ramli	9,549	44.28	▼16.88
PKR	Ferdaus Kayau	8,911	41.32	▲41.32
PAS	Abdul Hadi Harun	3,106	14.40	▼24.44
Total valid votes		21,566	100.00	
Total rejected ballots		380		
Unreturned ballots		91		
Turnout		22,037	86.47	▼3.18
Registered electors		25,484		
Majority		638	2.96	▼19.36
BN hold		Swing		

Johor state election, 2013
Party	Candidate	Votes	%	∆%
BN	Azizah Zakaria	10,839	61.16	▼10.34
PAS	Noor Khalim Sakib	6,883	38.84	▲10.34
Total valid votes		17,722	100.00	
Total rejected ballots		350		
Unreturned ballots		45		
Turnout		18,117	89.66	▲9.16
Registered electors		20,207		
Majority		3,956	22.32	▼20.67
BN hold		Swing		

Johor state election, 2008
Party	Candidate	Votes	%	∆%
BN	Ab Aziz Kaprawi	9,690	71.50	▼7.58
PAS	Mustafha Abd. Rahman	3,863	28.50	▲7.58
Total valid votes		13,553	100.00	
Total rejected ballots		334		
Unreturned ballots		39		
Turnout		13,926	80.50	▲4.08
Registered electors		17,300		
Majority		5,827	42.99	▼15.16
BN hold		Swing		

Johor state election, 2004
Party	Candidate	Votes	%	∆%
BN	Ab Aziz Kaprawi	10,410	79.08	▲11.01
PAS	Daeng Sanusi Daeng Mariok	2,754	20.92	▼11.01
Total valid votes		13,164	100.00	
Total rejected ballots		0		
Unreturned ballots		0		
Turnout		13,164	76.41	▲1.75
Registered electors		17,227		
Majority		7,656	58.16	▲22.01
BN hold		Swing		

Johor state election, 1999
Party	Candidate	Votes	%	∆%
BN	Ali Shikh Ahmad	14,129	68.07	▲1.88
PAS	Daeng Sanusi Daeng Mariok	6,627	31.93	▲31.93
Total valid votes		20,756	100.00	
Total rejected ballots		561		
Unreturned ballots		19		
Turnout		21,336	74.67	▲1.05
Registered electors		28,574		
Majority		7,502	36.14	▼4.95
BN hold		Swing		

Johor state election, 1995
Party	Candidate	Votes	%	∆%
BN	Zahar Bachik	12,421	66.19	▼6.73
Independent	Ahmad Rais	4,710	25.10	▲25.10
S46	Mohd Saidi Taul	1,635	8.71	▼18.37
Total valid votes		18,766	100.00	
Total rejected ballots		611		
Unreturned ballots		41		
Turnout		19,418	73.62	▼2.81
Registered electors		26,377		
Majority		7,711	41.09	▼4.75
BN hold		Swing		

Johor state election, 1990
Party	Candidate	Votes	%	∆%
BN	Zahar Bachik	11,052	72.92	▲22.04
Parti Melayu Semabgat 46	Jamaludin Keling	4,104	27.08	▲27.08
Total valid votes		15,156	100.00	
Total rejected ballots		864		
Unreturned ballots		4		
Turnout		16,024	76.43	▲2.97
Registered electors		20,965		
Majority		6,948	45.84	▲42.95
BN hold		Swing		

Johor state election, 1988
Party	Candidate	Votes	%	∆%
BN	Mohd. Yasin Kamari	7,262	50.88	
Independent	Hamdan Yahya	6,849	47.99	
Independent	Mohd Amin Zakaria	67	0.47	
Independent	Aman Abdullah	42	0.29	
Independent	Haron Abdul Samad	30	0.21	
Independent	Mohamed Yusof @ Mohamed Salleh Anjau	13	0.09	
Independent	Mohamed Kelana Ahmad	9	0.06	
Total valid votes		14,272	100.00	
Total rejected ballots		165		
Unreturned ballots		0		
Turnout		14,437	73.47	▲73.47
Registered electors		19,651		
Majority		413	2.89	▲2.89
BN hold		Swing		

Johor state election, 1986
Party	Candidate	Votes	%	∆%
BN	Syed Zain Idrus			
Total valid votes				
Total rejected ballots				
Unreturned ballots				
Turnout				
Registered electors		19,625		
Majority				
BN hold		Swing		

Johor state election, 1982
Party	Candidate	Votes	%	∆%
On the nomination day, Md. Sharif Lasim won uncontested.
BN	Md. Sharif Lasim			
Total valid votes				
Total rejected ballots				
Unreturned ballots				
Turnout				
Registered electors		18,564		
Majority				
BN hold		Swing		

Johor state election, 1978
Party	Candidate	Votes	%	∆%
BN	Md. Sharif Lasim	10,281	89.63	
PAS	Abdullah Abu Bakar	1,189	10.37	
Total valid votes		11,470	100.00	
Total rejected ballots		670		
Unreturned ballots		0		
Turnout		12,140	77.80	▲77.80
Registered electors		15,604		
Majority		9,092	79.27	▲79.27
BN hold		Swing		

Johor state election, 1974
Party	Candidate	Votes	%
On the nomination day, Yusa Nawawi won uncontested.
BN	Yusa Nawawi		
Total valid votes			
Total rejected ballots			
Unreturned ballots			
Turnout			
Registered electors		14,252	
Majority			
This was a new constituency created.
