= Mohamad Najib Samuri =

Malaysian politician

Yang Berhormat Datuk Mohamad Najib Samuri MLA DPSM
- موهاماد ناجيب ساموري

Member of the Johor State Legislative Assembly for Parit Yaani
- Incumbent
- Assumed office 2022
- Preceded by: Aminolhuda Hassan

Personal details
- Born: Mohamad Najib bin Samuri
- Citizenship: Malaysian
- Party: UMNO
- Other political affiliations: Barisan Nasional
- Occupation: Politician

Mohamad Najib bin Samuri is a Malaysian politician from UMNO. He has served as the Member of the Johor State Legislative Assembly for Parit Yaani since 2022.

== Election results ==
Johor State Legislative Assembly
| Year | Constituency | Candidate | Votes | Pct. | Opponent(s) | Votes | Pct. | Ballots cast | Majority | Turnout |
|---|---|---|---|---|---|---|---|---|---|---|
| 2022 | N21 Parit Yaani | Mohamad Najib Samuri (UMNO) | 9,070 | 38.56% | Aminolhuda Hassan (AMANAH) | 8,776 | 37.31% | 23,520 | 294 | 56.20% |
| 2022 | N21 Parit Yaani | Mohamad Najib Samuri (UMNO) | 9,070 | 38.56% | Ahmad Nawfal Mahfodz (PAS) | 5,435 | 23.11% | 23,520 | 294 | 56.20% |
| 2022 | N21 Parit Yaani | Mohamad Najib Samuri (UMNO) | 9,070 | 38.56% | Mohd Ridhauddin Mohd Tahir (PEJUANG) | 239 | 1.02% | 23,520 | 294 | 56.20% |
| 2026 | N21 Parit Yaani | Mohamad Najib Samuri (UMNO) | 19,665 | 62.02% | Md Ezam Md Taslim (AMANAH) | 12,045 | 37.98% | 31,983 | 7,620 | 71.48% |

== Honours ==
- Malacca :
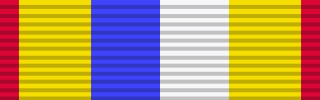
  - Companion Class II of the Order of Malacca (DPSM) - Datuk (2019)
