= Parit Yaani (state constituency) =

Political subdivision in Malaysia

Parit Yaani (N21)
Johor constituency

State constituency
- Legislature: Johor State Legislative Assembly
MLA
Mohamad Najib Samuri
BN
- Constituency created: 1984
- First contested: 1986
- Last contested: 2026

Demographics
- Population (2020): 80,650
- Electors (2026): 44,741
- Area (km²): 147

Parit Yaani is a state constituency in Johor, Malaysia, that is represented in the Johor State Legislative Assembly.

The state constituency was first contested in 1986 and is mandated to return a single Assemblyman to the Johor State Legislative Assembly under the first-past-the-post voting system.

== Demographics ==
As of 2020, Parit Yaani has a population of 80,650 people.

Ethnic breakdown of Parit Yaani's electorate as of 2026
1. Malay (55.2%)
2. Chinese (42.8%)
3. Other ethnicities (1.10%)
4. Indian (0.90%)

== History ==
=== Polling districts ===
According to the gazette issued on 2 July 2026, the Parit Yaani constituency has a total of 13 polling districts.

State constituency	Polling Districts	Code	Location
Parit Yaani（N21）	Parit Jambi	149/21/01	SK Tenaga Sepakat
Parit Yaani（N21）	Parit Selulun	149/21/02	SK Seri Tanjong
Parit Yaani（N21）	Bukit Rahmat	149/21/03	SK Bukit Rahmat
Parit Yaani（N21）	Tongkang Pechah	149/21/04	SJK (C) Tongkang
Parit Yaani（N21）	Bandar Tongkang Pechah	149/21/05	SK Seri Binjai
Parit Yaani（N21）	Parit Buloh	149/21/06	SK Bindu
Parit Yaani（N21）	Pekan Parit Yaani	149/21/07	SJK (C) Yani
Parit Yaani（N21）	Kampong Bahru Parit Yaani	149/21/08	SK Seri Telok
Parit Yaani（N21）	Kampong Bahru	149/21/09	SK Seri Idaman
Parit Yaani（N21）	Parit Yob	149/21/10	SK Seri Bengkal
Parit Yaani（N21）	Broleh Utara	149/21/11	SK Seri Beroleh; SA Seri Beroleh; SJK (C) Hwan Nan
Parit Yaani（N21）	Broleh Tengah	149/21/12	SK Bukit Soga; SK Seri Beroleh
Parit Yaani（N21）	Bukit Pasir Timor	149/21/13	SJK (C) Sin Hwa; SJK (C) Hua Min

=== Representation history ===
Members of the Legislative Assembly for Parit Yaani
Assembly	No	Years	Member	Party
Constituency created from Sri Lalang, Parit Raja and Peserai
7th	N19	1986-1990	Mohamad Aziz	BN (UMNO)
8th	N19	1990-1995	Mohamad Aziz	BN (UMNO)
9th	N19	1995-1999	Mohamad Aziz	BN (UMNO)
10th	N19	1999-2004	Hamzah Ramli	BN (UMNO)
11th	N21	2004-2008	Ng See Tiong (黃世忠)	BN (MCA)
12th	N21	2008-2013	Ng See Tiong (黃世忠)	BN (MCA)
13th	N21	2013–2015	Aminolhuda Hassan	PR (PAS)
13th	N21	2015–2018	Aminolhuda Hassan	AMANAH
14th	N21	2018-2022	Aminolhuda Hassan	PH (AMANAH)
15th	N21	2022–2026	Mohamad Najib Samuri	BN (UMNO)
16th	N21	2026–present	Mohamad Najib Samuri	BN (UMNO)

== Election results ==
Johor state election, 2026
Party	Candidate	Votes	%	∆%
BN	Mohamad Najib Samuri	19,665	62.02	▲23.46
PH	Md Ezam Md Taslim	12,045	37.98	▲0.67
Total valid votes		31,710	100.00	
Total rejected ballots		231		
Unreturned ballots		42		
Turnout		31,983	71.48	▲13.90
Registered electors		44,741		
Majority		7,620	24.03	▲22.78
BN hold		Swing		?

Johor state election, 2022
Party	Candidate	Votes	%	∆%
BN	Mohamad Najib Samuri	9,070	38.56	▲5.67
PH	Aminolhuda Hassan	8,776	37.31	▲37.31
PN	Ahmad Nawfal Mahfodz	5,435	23.11	▲23.11
PEJUANG	Ridhauddin Tahir	239	1.02	▲1.01
Total valid votes		23,520	100.00	
Total rejected ballots		424		
Unreturned ballots		157		
Turnout		24,101	57.88	▼29.77
Registered electors		41,851		
Majority		294	1.25	▼20.02
BN gain from PKR		Swing		?

Johor state election, 2018
Party	Candidate	Votes	%	∆%
PKR	Aminolhuda Hassan	12,309	54.16	▲54.16
BN	Soh Lip Yan	7,475	32.89	▼14.33
PAS	Nasir Abdullah	2,943	12.95	▼39.83
Total valid votes		22,727	100.00	
Total rejected ballots		237		
Unreturned ballots		194		
Turnout		23,158	86.95	▼1.57
Registered electors		26,635		
Majority		4,834	21.27	▲15.71
PKR gain from PAS		Swing		-

Johor state election, 2013
Party	Candidate	Votes	%	∆%
PAS	Aminolhuda Hassan	11,278	52.78	▲15.65
BN	Teo Yew Chuan	10,090	47.22	▼15.65
Total valid votes		21,368	100.00	
Total rejected ballots		379		
Unreturned ballots		35		
Turnout		21,782	88.51	▲9.86
Registered electors		24,609		
Majority		1,188	5.56	▼20.19
PAS gain from BN		Swing		-

Johor state election, 2008
Party	Candidate	Votes	%	∆%
BN	Ng See Tiong	9,419	62.87	▼13.50
PAS	Hashim Jusoh	5,562	37.13	▲13.50
Total valid votes		14,981	100.00	
Total rejected ballots		358		
Unreturned ballots		34		
Turnout		15,373	78.65	▲4.41
Registered electors		19,545		
Majority		3,857	25.75	▼27.00
BN hold		Swing		

Johor state election, 2004
Party	Candidate	Votes	%	∆%
BN	Ng See Tiong	10,535	76.37	▲76.37
PAS	Muhamad Yusof Masran	3,259	23.63	▼2.04
Total valid votes		13,794	100.00	
Total rejected ballots		0		
Unreturned ballots		0		
Turnout		13,794	74.24	▼0.67
Registered electors		18,580		
Majority		7,276	52.75	▲4.07
BN hold		Swing		

Johor state election, 1999
Party	Candidate	Votes	%	∆%
BN	Hamzah Ramli	14,635	74.34	▼12.66
PAS	Baharuddin Mohd Salleh	5,052	25.66	▲25.66
Total valid votes		19,687	100.00	
Total rejected ballots		612		
Unreturned ballots		29		
Turnout		20,328	74.91	▲1.64
Registered electors		27,136		
Majority		9,583	48.68	▼25.32
BN hold		Swing		

Johor state election, 1995
Party	Candidate	Votes	%	∆%
BN	Mohamad Aziz	15,713	87.00	▲14.70
S46	Mohd Said Jamhari	2,348	13.00	▲13.00
Total valid votes		18,061	100.00	
Total rejected ballots		631		
Unreturned ballots		17		
Turnout		18,709	73.27	▼1.26
Registered electors		25,533		
Majority		13,365	74.00	▲29.39
BN hold		Swing		

Johor state election, 1990
Party	Candidate	Votes	%
BN	Mohamad Aziz	10,244	72.30
PAS	Mohd Saidi Taul	3,924	27.70
Total valid votes		14,168	100.00
Total rejected ballots		770	
Unreturned ballots		1	
Turnout		14,939	74.54
Registered electors		20,042	
Majority		6,320	44.61
BN hold		Swing	

Johor state election, 1986
Party	Candidate	Votes	%
On the nomination day, Mohamad Aziz won uncontested.
BN	Mohamad Aziz		
Total valid votes			
Total rejected ballots			
Unreturned ballots			
Turnout			
Registered electors		19,084	
Majority			
This was a new constituency created.
