= Mustaffa Mohammad =

Malaysian politician (died 2021)

Yang Berhormat (Note: The prefix "Yang Berhormat" is used for recipients of the First and Second Classes of the Johor's Orders of Chivalry.) Dato' Mustaffa Mohammad DPMJ KMN PIS BSI
- مصطفى محمد

Ministerial roles
- 1983–1986: Parliamentary Secretary in the Prime Minister's Department
- 1986–1987: Deputy Minister of Works
- 1987–1990: Minister of Social Welfare

Faction represented in Dewan Rakyat
- 1981–1990: Barisan Nasional

Personal details
- Born: 1941 Johor
- Died: 10 January 2021 (aged 79–80)
- Resting place: Abdullah Faqih Mosque Muslim Cemetery, Parit Raja, Johor
- Citizenship: Malaysian
- Party: United Malays National Organisation (UMNO)
- Other political affiliations: Barisan Nasional (BN)
- Occupation: Politician

Mustaffa bin Mohammad was a Malaysian politician and former Minister of Social Welfare from 1987 to 1990. He also served as Deputy Minister of Works.

== Election results ==
Parliament of Malaysia
Year	Constituency	Candidate	Votes	Pct	Opponent(s)	Votes	Pct	Ballots cast	Majority	Turnout
1981	P109 Sri Gading	Mustaffa Mohammad (UMNO)	21,037	91.42%	Mohamed Sulaiman @ Mohamed Anuar (PAS)	1,974	8.58%	23,474	19,063	82.84%
1982	P109 Sri Gading	Mustaffa Mohammad (UMNO)	23,369	88.46%	Ahmad Kailani (PAS)	3,048	11.54%	27,389	20,321	76.66%
1986	P124 Sri Gading	Mustaffa Mohammad (UMNO)	None	None	Unopposed					

== Honours ==
=== Honours of Malaysia ===
- Malaysia
  - Officer of the Order of the Defender of the Realm (KMN) (1977)
- Johor
  - Star of Sultan Ismail (BSI)
  - Sultan Ibrahim Medal (PIS)
  - Knight Commander of the Order of the Crown of Johor (DPMJ) – Dato' (1989)
