= Nor Rashidah Ramli =

Malaysian politician (born 1979)

Yang Berhormat Puan Nor Rashidah Ramli MLA
- نور رشيدة رملي

Member of the Johor State Legislative Assembly for Parit Raja
- Incumbent
- Assumed office 9 May 2018
- Preceded by: Azizah Zakaria (BN–UMNO)
- Majority: 638 (2018); 4,219 (2022)

Faction represented in Johor State Legislative Assembly
- 2018–: Barisan Nasional

Personal details
- Born: 5 June 1979 (age 47) Batu Pahat, Johor, Malaysia
- Citizenship: Malaysian
- Party: United Malays National Organisation (UMNO)
- Other party: Barisan Nasional (BN)
- Spouse: Mohd Amrizan Amran
- Children: 4
- Occupation: Politician

Nor Rashidah binti Ramli (born 1979) is a Malaysian politician who served as Member of the Johor State Legislative Assembly (MLA) for Parit Raja since May 2018. She is a member of the United Malays National Organisation (UMNO), a component party of the ruling BN coalition.

== Election results ==
Johor State Legislative Assembly
Year	Constituency		Votes	Pct	Opponent(s)	Votes	Pct	Ballots cast	Majority	Turnout
2018	N35 Parit Raja	Nor Rashidah Ramli (UMNO)	9,549	44.28%	Ferdaus Kayau (BERSATU)	8,911	41.32%	21,566	638	84.63%
2018	N35 Parit Raja	Nor Rashidah Ramli (UMNO)	9,549	44.28%	Mohd Jubri Selamat (PAS)	3,106	14.40%	21,566	638	84.63%
2022	N35 Parit Raja	Nor Rashidah Ramli (UMNO)	10,634	49.57%	Zulkifli Mat Daud (BERSATU)	6,415	29.90%	21,452	4,219	59.49%
2022	N35 Parit Raja	Nor Rashidah Ramli (UMNO)	10,634	49.57%	Fikri Musa (MUDA)	3,893	18.15%	21,452	4,219	59.49%
2022	N35 Parit Raja	Nor Rashidah Ramli (UMNO)	10,634	49.57%	Lateef Mahrani (PEJUANG)	510	2.38%	21,452	4,219	59.49%
2026	N35 Parit Raja	Nor Rashidah Ramli (UMNO)			Mohamed Maliki Mohamed Rapiee (BERSATU)					
2026	N35 Parit Raja	Nor Rashidah Ramli (UMNO)			Shazwan Zdainal Abidin (DAP)					
