= Aziz Kaprawi =

Malaysian politician

Yang Berbahagia Datuk Ab Aziz Kaprawi PJN AMN
- عبدالعزيز کڤراوي
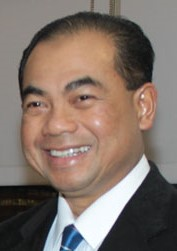
- Aziz, 2013

Deputy Minister of Transport
- In office 16 May 2013 – 9 May 2018
- Monarchs: Abdul Halim; Muhammad V
- Prime Minister: Najib Razak
- Minister: Hishammuddin Hussein (Acting) (2013–2014); Liow Tiong Lai (2014–2018)
- Preceded by: Abdul Rahim Bakri; Jelaing Mersat
- Succeeded by: Kamarudin Jaffar
- Constituency: Sri Gading

Johor State Executive Councillor (Youth and Sports : 31 March 2004–15 March 2008) (Agriculture and Agro-Based Industry : 16 March 2008–13 May 2013)
- In office 31 March 2004 – 13 May 2013
- Monarchs: Iskandar; Ibrahim Ismail
- Menteri Besar: Abdul Ghani Othman
- Preceded by: Ahmad Zahri Jamil
- Succeeded by: Ismail Mohamed
- Constituency: Parit Raja

Member of the Malaysian Parliament for Sri Gading
- In office 5 May 2013 – 10 May 2018
- Preceded by: Mohamad Aziz (BN–UMNO)
- Succeeded by: Shahruddin Md Salleh (PH–PPBM)
- Majority: 5,761 (2013)

Member of the Johor State Legislative Assembly for Parit Raja
- In office 21 March 2004 – 5 May 2013
- Preceded by: Ali Shikh Ahmad (BN–UMNO)
- Succeeded by: Azizah Zakaria (BN–UMNO)
- Majority: 7,656 (2004); 5,827 (2008)

Personal details
- Born: Ab Aziz bin Kaprawi; 24 July 1959 (age 67) Batu Pahat, Johor, Federation of Malaya (now Malaysia)
- Citizenship: Malaysian
- Party: United Malay National Organisation (UMNO)
- Other political affiliations: Barisan Nasional (BN); Perikatan Nasional (PN); Muafakat Nasional (MN)
- Spouse: Sabariah Tokimin
- Children: 5
- Occupation: Politician

Ab Aziz bin Kaprawi (born 24 July 1959) is a Malaysian politician. He was the Johor State Legislative Assembly member for the constituency of Parit Raja from 2004 to 2013 and Member of Parliament for Sri Gading in Johor from 2013 until 2018. He was the Deputy Minister of Transport in the Malaysian cabinet. He is a member of United Malay National Organisation (UMNO), a major component party in the Barisan Nasional (BN) coalition.

== Political career ==
=== Johor Executive Councillor ===
During his tenure as an executive councillor in the Johor state executive council, Ab Aziz Kaprawi was also one of the panellists for the joint venture project for the 3,642.17ha land agriculture project with JCorp, a state owned corporate institution.

=== Deputy Minister ===
Ab Aziz Kaprawi said that his appointment as the Deputy Minister of Transport was a pleasant surprise as he did not expect to be appointed in any Federal position. However, he did vow to give his best to the people of Malaysia. He was one of the new faces that Prime Minister Najib Razak had personally selected to be in his cabinet. He also said that one of his most challenging task is to address the Automated Enforcement System (AES) issue and public transportation

== Controversy ==
In August 2015, Aziz Kaprawi asserted that the RM2.6 billion donation from anonymous sources to Malaysian Prime Minister Najib Razak's personal accounts between March 2013 and February 2015 were part of an effort to fight a global Jewish conspiracy against Malaysia, accusing the leading opposition party Democratic Action Party of being 'based on and funded by the Jews'.

Aziz Kaprawi made an announcement on 4 Apr 2015 that the vehicle entry permit (VEP) for vehicles entering Malaysia from Singapore will start on 1 Aug, after being delayed from June, before being further delayed to 1 September, and then to 1 October.

== Election results ==
Parliament of Malaysia
Year	Constituency	Candidate	Votes	Pct	Opponent(s)	Votes	Pct	Ballots cast	Majority	Turnout
2013	P149 Sri Gading	Ab Aziz Kaprawi (UMNO)	22,453	57.36%	Mohd Khuzzan Abu Bakar (PKR)	16,692	42.64%	39,899	5,761	89.03%
2018	P149 Sri Gading	Ab Aziz Kaprawi (UMNO)	18,223	41.15%	Shahruddin Md Salleh (BERSATU)	21,511	48.58%	45,193	3,288	86.71%
2018	P149 Sri Gading	Ab Aziz Kaprawi (UMNO)	18,223	41.15%	M. Ash'ari Sidon (PAS)	4,548	10.27%	45,193	3,288	86.71%

Johor State Legislative Assembly
Year	Constituency	Candidate	Votes	Pct	Opponent(s)	Votes	Pct	Ballots cast	Majority	Turnout
2004	N22 Parit Raja	Ab Aziz Kaprawi (UMNO)	10,410	79.08%	Sanusi Daing Mariok (PAS)	2,754	20.92%	13,164	7,656	76.41%
2008	N22 Parit Raja	Ab Aziz Kaprawi (UMNO)	9,690	69.58%	Mustafha Abd Rahman (PAS)	3,863	27.74%	13,926	5,827	80.50%

== Honours ==
- Malaysia
  - Commander of the Order of Meritorious Service (PJN) – Datuk (2010)
  - Member of the Order of the Defender of the Realm (AMN) (2005)

== See also ==
- Sri Gading (federal constituency)
