= Sepang (federal constituency) =

Federal constituency of Selangor, Malaysia

Sepang (P113)
Selangor constituency

Federal constituency
- Legislature: Dewan Rakyat
- MP: Aiman Athirah Sabu; PH
- Constituency created: 1958
- First contested: 1959
- Last contested: 2022

Demographics
- Population (2020): 384,244
- Electors (2023): 173,518
- Area (km²): 841
- Pop. density (per km²): 456.9

Sepang is a federal constituency in Sepang District and Kuala Langat District, Selangor, Malaysia, that has been represented in the Dewan Rakyat since 1959.

The federal constituency was created in the 1958 redistribution and is mandated to return a single member to the Dewan Rakyat under the first past the post voting system.

== Demographics ==
Ethnic breakdown of Sepang's electorate as of 2018
1. Malay (66.0%)
2. Chinese (19.2%)
3. Indian (13.0%)
4. Other ethnicities (1.80%)
Age breakdown of Sepang's electorate as of 2022
1. 18-20 (9.11%)
2. 21-29 (25.2%)
3. 30-39 (21.4%)
4. 40-49 (17.7%)
5. 50-59 (13.4%)
6. 60-69 (8.35%)
7. 70-79 (3.49%)
8. 80-89 (1.08%)
9. above 90 (0.23%)
Gender breakdown of Sepang's electorate as of 2022
1. Male (50.2%)
2. Female (49.8%)

== History ==
=== Polling districts ===
According to the federal gazette issued on 18 July 2023, the Sepang constituency is divided into 51 polling districts.

State constituency	Polling Districts	Code	Location
Tanjong Sepat (N54)	Bukit Bangkung	113/54/01	SRA Kampung Bukit Bangkong
Tanjong Sepat (N54)	Sungai Rawang	113/54/02	SK Sungai Rawang
Tanjong Sepat (N54)	Tanjong Rhu	113/54/03	SJK (T) Teluk Merbau
Tanjong Sepat (N54)	Tanjong Sepat Tempatan 1	113/54/04	SJK (C) Tanjong Sepat
Tanjong Sepat (N54)	Tanjong Sepat Tempatan 2	113/54/05	SMK Tanjong Sepat
Tanjong Sepat (N54)	Tanjong Sepat Tempatan 3	113/53/06	SJK (C) Tanjong Sepat
Tanjong Sepat (N54)	Tanjong Sepat Tempatan 4	113/54/07	SJK (C) Tanjong Sepat
Tanjong Sepat (N54)	Tanjong Sepat Tempatan 5	113/54/08	SJK (C) Tanjong Sepat
Tanjong Sepat (N54)	Tanjong Sepat 6	113/54/09	SK Tanjung Sepat
Tanjong Sepat (N54)	Kundang	113/54/10	SRA Kampung Kundang
Tanjong Sepat (N54)	Batu Laut	113/54/11	SK Batu Laut
Tanjong Sepat (N54)	Kampung Endah	113/54/12	SK Kampung Endah
Tanjong Sepat (N54)	Sungai Lang	113/54/13	SK Sungai Lang
Tanjong Sepat (N54)	Sungai Kelambu	113/54/14	SK Sungai Kelambu
Dengkil (N55)	Sungai Lempit	113/55/01	SK Olak Lempit
Dengkil (N55)	Bukit Changgang	113/55/02	SK Bukit Changgang
Dengkil (N55)	Labohan Dagang	113/55/03	SK Labohan Dagang
Dengkil (N55)	Ampar Tenang	113/55/04	SRA Dengkil
Dengkil (N55)	Kampung Baharu Dengkil	113/55/05	SJK (C) Dengkil
Dengkil (N55)	Kampung Dengkil	113/55/06	SK Dengkil
Dengkil (N55)	Pulau Meranti	113/55/07	SK Pulau Meranti
Dengkil (N55)	Sungai Merab Utara	113/55/08	SRA Dato' Abu Bakar Baginda
Dengkil (N55)	Kampung Dato Abu Bakar Baginda	113/55/09	SK Dato' Abu Bakar Baginda
Dengkil (N55)	Sungai Merab	113/55/10	SK Sungai Merab Luar
Dengkil (N55)	Desa Putra	113/55/11	SK Desa Putra
Dengkil (N55)	Jenderam Hilir	113/55/12	SK Jenderam Hilir
Dengkil (N55)	Sungai Buah	113/55/13	SRA Sungai Buah
Dengkil (N55)	Rtb Datok Harun	113/55/14	SK Rancangan Tanah Belia Bukit Changgang
Dengkil (N55)	Ladang Ampar Tenang	113/55/15	SJK (T) Ampar Tenang
Dengkil (N55)	Kampung Melot	113/55/16	SK Sungai Melut (A) Dengkil
Dengkil (N55)	Bandar Putra Perdana	113/55/17	SK Taman Putra Perdana; SK Taman Putra Perdana 2
Dengkil (N55)	Taman Permata Dengkil	113/55/18	SJK (T) Taman Permata
Dengkil (N55)	Desa Air Hitam	113/55/19	SJK (C) Sin Ming
Dengkil (N55)	Cyberjaya	113/55/20	SK Cyberjaya 1
Dengkil (N55)	Selangor Dredging	113/55/21	Balai Raya Kampung Selangor Dredging
Dengkil (N55)	Desa Pinggiran Putra	113/55/22	SK Desa Pinggiran Putra
Dengkil (N55)	Kota Warisan	113/55/23	SK Kota Warisan
Sungai Pelek (N56)	Jenderam Hulu	113/56/01	SK Jenderam
Sungai Pelek (N56)	Salak	113/56/02	SK Salak
Sungai Pelek (N56)	Salak Jijan	113/56/03	SJK (C) Chio Chiao
Sungai Pelek (N56)	Lothian Timur	113/56/04	SJK (T) Ladang Bute
Sungai Pelek (N56)	Sepang Utara	113/56/05	SJK (C) Sepang
Sungai Pelek (N56)	Sepang Selatan	113/56/06	SJK (T) Sepang
Sungai Pelek (N56)	Hulu Cucuh	113/56/07	Dewan Orang Ramai Kampung Ulu Chucoh
Sungai Pelek (N56)	Bagan Lalang	113/56/08	SMK Pantai Sepang Putra
Sungai Pelek (N56)	Sungai Pelek Tiga	113/56/09	SMK Sungai Pelek
Sungai Pelek (N56)	Sungai Pelek Dua	113/56/10	SJK (C) Wah Lian
Sungai Pelek (N56)	Sungai Pelek Empat	113/56/11	SK Sungai Pelek
Sungai Pelek (N56)	Bandar Baru Salak Tinggi	113/56/12	SK Bandar Baru Salak Tinggi
Sungai Pelek (N56)	Taman Seroja	113/56/13	SK Taman Seroja
Sungai Pelek (N56)	Taman Mawar	113/56/14	SK KLIA

=== Representation history ===
Members of Parliament for Sepang
Parliament	No	Years	Member	Party	Vote Share
Constituency created from Langat
Parliament of the Federation of Malaya
1st	P076	1959–1963	Lee Siok Yew (李孝友)	Alliance (MCA)	4,992; 46.78%
Parliament of Malaysia
1st	P076	1963–1964	Lee Siok Yew (李孝友)	Alliance (MCA)	4,992; 46.78%
2nd	P076	1964–1969	Lee Siok Yew (李孝友)	Alliance (MCA)	9,438; 63.48%
		1969–1971	Parliament was suspended		
3rd	P076	1971–1973	Lee Siok Yew (李孝友)	Alliance (MCA)	8,450; 55.77%
3rd	P076	1973–1974	Lee Siok Yew (李孝友)	BN (MCA)	8,450; 55.77%
4th	P083	1974–1978	Suhaimi Kamaruddin (سحيمي قمرالدين)	BN (UMNO)	12,668; 74.63%
5th	P083	1978–1982	Suhaimi Kamaruddin (سحيمي قمرالدين)	BN (UMNO)	11,404; 54.81%
6th	P083	1982–1986	Suhaimi Kamaruddin (سحيمي قمرالدين)	BN (UMNO)	16,105; 60.91%
7th	P095	1986–1990	Mohd. Sharif Jajang (محمد. شريف جاجڠ)	BN (UMNO)	18,253; 63.95%
8th	P095	1990–1995	Mohd. Sharif Jajang (محمد. شريف جاجڠ)	BN (UMNO)	22,855; 62.88%
9th	P102	1995–1999	Seripah Noli Syed Hussin (شريفة نولي سيد حسين)	BN (UMNO)	26,022; 71.54%
10th	P102	1999–2004	Seripah Noli Syed Hussin (شريفة نولي سيد حسين)	BN (UMNO)	23,069; 59.19%
11th	P113	2004–2008	Mohd Zin Mohamed (محمد زين بن محمد)	BN (UMNO)	30,755; 72.07%
12th	P113	2008–2013	Mohd Zin Mohamed (محمد زين بن محمد)	BN (UMNO)	26,381; 55.06%
13th	P113	2013–2015	Mohamed Hanipa Maidin (محمد حنيفة بن ميدين)	PR (PAS)	36,800; 49.91%
13th	P113	2015–2018	Mohamed Hanipa Maidin (محمد حنيفة بن ميدين)	AMANAH	36,800; 49.91%
14th	P113	2018–2022	Mohamed Hanipa Maidin (محمد حنيفة بن ميدين)	PH (AMANAH)	46,740; 51.56%
15th	P113	2022–present	Aiman Athirah Sabu (أيمن عطيرة سابو)	PH (AMANAH)	56,264; 40.78%

=== State constituency ===
Parliamentary constituency	State constituency						
Parliamentary constituency	1955–59*	1959–1974	1974–1986	1986–1995	1995–2004	2004–2018	2018–present
Sepang			Batu Laut				
Sepang		Dengkil					
Sepang			Sungei Pelek			Sungai Pelek	
Sepang				Sungai Pelik			
Sepang		Sungei Rawang					
Sepang						Tanjong Sepat	

=== Historical boundaries ===
State Constitiency	Area					
State Constitiency	1959	1974	1984	1994	2003	2018
Batu Laut		Kampung Bukit Bangkong; Kampung Sungai Lang; Kanchong Darat; Kanchong Laut; Tanjong Sepat				
Dengkil	Desa Abu Bakar Baginda; Kampung Sungai Buah; Prang Besar; Pulau Meranti; Salak Tinggi	Dengkil; Desa Abu Bakar Baginda; Prang Besar; Pulau Meranti; Salak Tinggi	Dengkil; Desa Abu Bakar Baginda; Kampung Sungai Buah; Prang Besar; Pulau Meranti	Bandar Seri Putra; Bukit Changgang; Desa Abu Bakar Baginda; Prang Besar; Pulau Meranti	Bukit Changgang; Cyberjaya; Desa Abu Bakar Baginda; Kota Warisan; Salak Perdana	Bukit Changgang; Cyberjaya; Desa Abu Bakar Baginda; Kota Warisan; Southville City
Sungai Pelek		Bagan Lalang; Bukit Changgang; Salak; Sepang; Sungai Pelek	Bagan Lalang; Jenderam; Kampung Labu Lanjut; Salak Tinggi; Sepang	Bagan Lalang; Jenderam; Kampung Sungai Buah; Salak Tinggi; Sepang	Bagan Lalang; Kampung Labu Lanjut; Salak Tinggi; Sepang; Sungai Pelek	
Sungei Rawang	Bagan Lalang; Batu Laut; Kampung Bukit Bangkong; Sungai Pelek; Tanjong Sepat					
Tanjong Sepat					Batu Laut; Kampung Bukit Bangkong; Kampung Sungai Lang; Kanchong Laut; Tanjong Sepat	

=== Current state assembly members ===
No.	State Constituency	Member	Coalition (Party)
N54	Tanjong Sepat	Borhan Aman Shah	PH (PKR)
N55	Dengkil	Jamil Salleh	PN (BERSATU)
N56	Sungai Pelek	Lwi Kian Keong	PH (DAP)

=== Local governments & postcodes ===
No.	State Constituency	Local Government	Postcode
N54	Tanjong Sepat	Kuala Langat Municipal Council; Sepang Municipal Council (Bukit Bangkong area)	42700 Banting; 42800 Tanjong Sepat; 43000 Kajang; 43800 Dengkil; 43900 Sepang; 43950 Sungai Pelek; 47110, 47120, 47130 Puchong; 63000, 63100, 63200, 63300, 64000 Cyberjaya
N55	Dengkil	Kuala Langat Municipal Council (Labohan Dagang and Bukit Changgang area); Sepang Municipal Council	42700 Banting; 42800 Tanjong Sepat; 43000 Kajang; 43800 Dengkil; 43900 Sepang; 43950 Sungai Pelek; 47110, 47120, 47130 Puchong; 63000, 63100, 63200, 63300, 64000 Cyberjaya
N56	Sungai Pelek	Sepang Municipal Council	42700 Banting; 42800 Tanjong Sepat; 43000 Kajang; 43800 Dengkil; 43900 Sepang; 43950 Sungai Pelek; 47110, 47120, 47130 Puchong; 63000, 63100, 63200, 63300, 64000 Cyberjaya

== Election results ==
Malaysian general election, 2022
Party	Candidate	Votes	%	∆%
PH	Aiman Athirah Al Jundi	56,264	40.78	▲40.78
PN	Rina Harun	47,315	34.30	▲34.30
BN	Anuar Basiran	31,097	22.54	▼8.38
PEJUANG	Che Asmah Ibrahim	2,337	1.69	▲1.69
Independent	Mohd Syahrul Amri Mat Sari	319	0.23	▲0.23
Parti Utama Rakyat	Mohd Daud Leong Abdullah	264	0.19	▲0.19
Independent	Muneswaran Muthiah	194	0.14	▲0.14
Parti Rakyat Malaysia	Nageswaran Ravi	165	0.12	▲0.12
Total valid votes		137,955	100.00	
Total rejected ballots		1,423		
Unreturned ballots		289		
Turnout		139,667	83.10	▼2.01
Registered electors		168,039		
Majority		8,949	6.48	▼14.15
PH hold		Swing		
Source(s) https://lom.agc.gov.my/ilims/upload/portal/akta/outputp/1753283/PUB612.pdf

Malaysian general election, 2018
Party	Candidate	Votes	%	∆%
PKR	Mohamed Hanipa Maidin	46,740	51.56	▲51.56
BN	Marsum Paing	28,035	30.92	▼17.44
PAS	Sabirin Marsono	15,882	17.52	▼32.39
Total valid votes		90,657	100.00	
Total rejected ballots		1,083		
Unreturned ballots		347		
Turnout		92,087	88.11	▼0.95
Registered electors		104,508		
Majority		18,705	20.63	▲19.08
PKR gain from PAS		Swing		?
Source(s) "His Majesty's Government Gazette - Notice of Contested Election, Parliament for the State of Selangor [P.U. (B) 239/2018]" (PDF). Attorney General's Chambers of Malaysia. 3 May 2018. Archived from the original (PDF) on 2019-07-19. "Federal Government Gazette - Results of Contested Election and Statements of the Poll after the Official Addition of Votes, Parliamentary Constituencies for the State of Selangor [P.U. (B) 313/2018]" (PDF). Attorney General's Chambers of Malaysia. 28 May 2018. Archived from the original (PDF) on 2019-07-19.

Malaysian general election, 2013
Party	Candidate	Votes	%	∆%
PAS	Mohamed Hanipa Maidin	36,800	49.91	▲4.97
BN	Mohd Zin Mohamed	35,658	48.36	▼6.70
Independent	Suhaimi Mohd Ghazali	962	1.30	▲1.30
Independent	Hanapiah Mohamad	315	0.43	▲0.43
Total valid votes		73,735	100.00	
Total rejected ballots		1,226		
Unreturned ballots		174		
Turnout		75,135	89.06	▲9.86
Registered electors		84,362		
Majority		1,142	1.55	▼8.57
PAS gain from BN		Swing		?
Source(s) "Federal Government Gazette - Notice of Contested Election, Parliament for the State of Selangor [P.U. (B) 176/2013]" (PDF). Attorney General's Chambers of Malaysia. 26 April 2013. Archived from the original (PDF) on 2018-09-30. "Federal Government Gazette - Results of Contested Election and Statements of the Poll after the Official Addition of Votes, Parliamentary Constituencies for the State of Selangor [P.U. (B) 217/2013]" (PDF). Attorney General's Chambers of Malaysia. 22 May 2013. Archived from the original (PDF) on 2018-09-30.

Malaysian general election, 2008
Party	Candidate	Votes	%	∆%
BN	Mohd Zin Mohamed	26,381	55.06	▼17.01
PAS	Mohamed Makki Ahmad	21,532	44.94	▲17.01
Total valid votes		47,913	100.00	
Total rejected ballots		1,099		
Unreturned ballots		125		
Turnout		49,137	79.20	▲5.35
Registered electors		62,044		
Majority		4,849	10.12	▼34.02
BN hold		Swing		

Malaysian general election, 2004
Party	Candidate	Votes	%	∆%
BN	Mohd Zin Mohamed	30,755	72.07	▲12.88
PAS	Mohamed Makki Ahmad	11,918	27.93	▼12.88
Total valid votes		42,673	100.00	
Total rejected ballots		315		
Unreturned ballots		66		
Turnout		43,054	73.85	▲0.27
Registered electors		58,296		
Majority		18,837	44.14	▲25.76
BN hold		Swing		

Malaysian general election, 1999
Party	Candidate	Votes	%	∆%
BN	Seripah Noli Syed Hussin	23,069	59.19	▼12.35
PAS	Mohamed Makki Ahmad	15,907	40.81	▲40.81
Total valid votes		38,976	100.00	
Total rejected ballots		1,131		
Unreturned ballots		38		
Turnout		40,145	74.12	▲0.79
Registered electors		74,502		
Majority		7,162	18.38	▼24.70
BN hold		Swing		

Malaysian general election, 1995
Party	Candidate	Votes	%	∆%
BN	Seripah Noli Syed Hussin	26,022	71.54	▲8.66
S46	Suhaimi Kamaruddin	10,353	28.46	▼8.66
Total valid votes		36,375	100.00	
Total rejected ballots		1,701		
Unreturned ballots		106		
Turnout		38,182	73.33	▼3.68
Registered electors		0		
Majority		15,669	43.08	▲17.32
BN hold		Swing		

Malaysian general election, 1990
Party	Candidate	Votes	%	∆%
BN	Mohd. Sharif Jajang	22,855	62.88	▼1.07
S46	Suhaimi Kamaruddin	13,492	37.12	▲37.12
Total valid votes		36,347	100.00	
Total rejected ballots		1,063		
Unreturned ballots		0		
Turnout		37,410	77.01	▲2.81
Registered electors		48,579		
Majority		9,363	25.76	▼13.34
BN hold		Swing		

Malaysian general election, 1986
Party	Candidate	Votes	%	∆%
BN	Mohd. Sharif Jajang	18,253	63.95	▲3.04
DAP	K. Ramasen	7,093	24.85	▲24.85
NASMA	Abdul Jabar Mohamed Yusof	2,757	9.66	▲9.66
SDP	Tai Siew Siong	439	1.54	▲1.54
Total valid votes		28,542	100.00	
Total rejected ballots		1,061		
Unreturned ballots		0		
Turnout		29,603	74.20	▼5.47
Registered electors		39,895		
Majority		11,160	39.10	▲14.55
BN hold		Swing		

Malaysian general election, 1982
Party	Candidate	Votes	%	∆%
BN	Suhaimi Kamaruddin	16,105	60.91	▲6.10
Independent	Abdul Jabar Mohamad Yusof	9,613	36.36	▲36.36
PAS	Mohamed Long Said @ Gulong	573	2.17	▼12.03
Independent	Thai Ah Ko @ Ther Ah King	148	0.56	▲0.56
Total valid votes		26,439	100.00	
Total rejected ballots		604		
Unreturned ballots		0		
Turnout		27,043	79.67	▲0.03
Registered electors		33,936		
Majority		6,492	24.55	▲0.72
BN hold		Swing		

Malaysian general election, 1978
Party	Candidate	Votes	%	∆%
BN	Suhaimi Kamaruddin	11,404	54.81	▲54.81
DAP	A. Kalai Chelvan	6,446	30.98	▲30.98
PAS	Mohamed Long Said @ Gulong	2,955	14.20	
Total valid votes		20,805	100.00	
Total rejected ballots		1,378		
Unreturned ballots		0		
Turnout		22,185	79.64	▼1.30
Registered electors		27,858		
Majority		4,958	23.83	
BN hold		Swing		

Malaysian general election, 1974
Party	Candidate	Votes	%	∆%
BN	Suhaimi Kamaruddin	12,668	74.63	▲74.63
PEKEMAS	Zainuddin Karim	4,307	25.37	▲25.37
Total valid votes		16,975	100.00	
Total rejected ballots		1,151		
Unreturned ballots		0		
Turnout		18,126	80.94	▲3.84
Registered electors		22,025		
Majority		8,361	49.26	▲37.72
BN gain from Alliance		Swing		?

Malaysian general election, 1969
Party	Candidate	Votes	%	∆%
Alliance	Lee Siok Yew	8,450	55.77	▼7.71
DAP	Oh Keng Seng	6,701	44.23	▲44.23
Total valid votes		15,151	100.00	
Total rejected ballots		950		
Unreturned ballots		0		
Turnout		16,101	77.10	▼6.31
Registered electors		20,884		
Majority		1,749	11.54	▼15.42
Alliance hold		Swing		

Malaysian general election, 1964
Party	Candidate	Votes	%	∆%
Alliance	Lee Siok Yew	9,438	63.48	▲16.70
Socialist Front	Lim Tuan Seong	5,429	36.52	▲4.15
Total valid votes		14,867	100.00	
Total rejected ballots		632		
Unreturned ballots		0		
Turnout		15,499	83.41	▲2.54
Registered electors		18,581		
Majority		4,009	26.96	▲12.55
Alliance hold		Swing		

Malayan general election, 1959
Party	Candidate	Votes	%
Alliance	Lee Siok Yew	4,992	46.78
Socialist Front	Lim Tuan Siong	3,455	32.37
PPP	K. V. Nadarajah	2,225	20.85
Total valid votes		10,672	100.00
Total rejected ballots		120	
Unreturned ballots		0	
Turnout		10,792	80.87
Registered electors		13,345	
Majority		1,537	14.41
This was a new constituency created.
