= Noor Azleen Ambros =

Malaysian politician (born 1985)

- نور ازلين امبروس
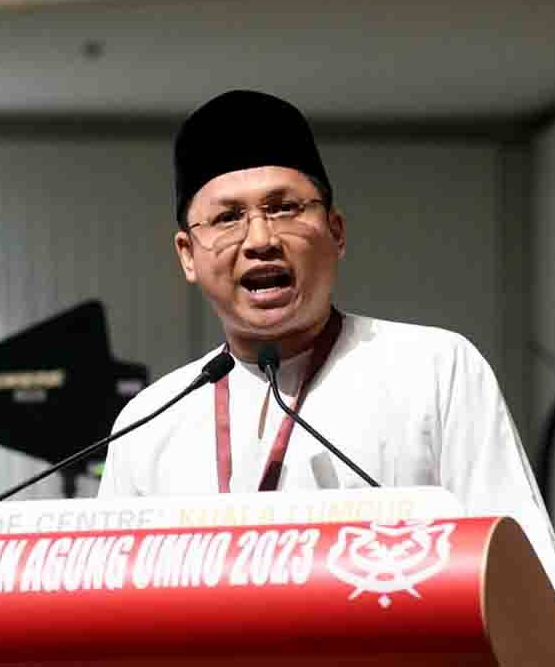

Chief of UMNO Youth Movement, Johor
- In office 2023–2026

Chief of UMNO Youth and Barisan Nasional Youth, Pasir Gudang
- Incumbent
- Assumed office June 2018

Member of Pasir Gudang City Council (MBPG)
- In office November 2020 – November 2022

Personal details
- Born: June 28, 1985 (age 41) Johor, Malaysia
- Citizenship: Malaysian
- Party: United Malays National Organisation (UMNO)
- Other political affiliations: Barisan Nasional (BN)
- Education: MRSM Jasin, Melaka; University of Warwick, United Kingdom; Universiti Malaya, Kuala Lumpur
- Occupation: Politician, Engineer, Public Administrator

Noor Azleen bin Ambros (born 28 June 1985) is a Malaysian politician and public administrator who serves as Chief of the UMNO Youth Movement for Johor for the 2023–2026 term. He is a member of the United Malays National Organisation (UMNO), a component party of the Barisan Nasional (BN) coalition. He previously contested the Pasir Gudang parliamentary seat (P159) in the 2022 general election (GE15) as the BN candidate, and has served as Chief of UMNO Youth and Barisan Nasional Youth for Pasir Gudang since June 2018.

== Early life and education ==
Noor Azleen received his secondary education at MRSM Jasin, Melaka, completing his Sijil Pelajaran Malaysia (SPM) in 2002. He subsequently pursued postgraduate studies at the University of Warwick, United Kingdom, earning a Master of Engineering (MEng) in Mechanical Engineering in 2008 as a recipient of the Malaysian Government Scholarship. In 2021, he furthered his academic qualifications with a Master of Public Policy (MPP) from Universiti Malaya, Kuala Lumpur.

== Career ==
=== Public service ===
Noor Azleen began his career in public service at the Johor Chief Minister's Office, serving as Director of the Media and Communications Unit from May 2013 to May 2018. In December 2023, he joined the Ministry of Defence as Special Duties Officer (Policy & International Affairs), following the appointment of Mohamed Khaled Nordin as Minister of Defence on 15 December 2023.

=== Private sector ===
Between May 2020 and April 2022, he served at Boustead Holdings Berhad as Manager of Group Reinvention and Strategy. From May 2022, he has served as Head of the Corporate and Strategic Planning Unit at Perisind Samudra Sdn. Bhd.

== Political career ==
=== UMNO Youth leadership ===
Noor Azleen has been active in UMNO politics since 2013, when he served as a member of the board of trustees for Yayasan Pasir Gudang (2013–2018). He was elected as Chief of UMNO Youth and Barisan Nasional Youth for Pasir Gudang in June 2018, a position he continues to hold. In September 2021, he was elected to the executive committee (Exco) of UMNO Youth Malaysia.

In 2023, Noor Azleen was appointed as Chief of the UMNO Youth Movement for the state of Johor for the 2023–2026 session, making him one of twelve state UMNO Youth chiefs across Malaysia.

=== Pasir Gudang City Council (2020–2022) ===
Noor Azleen served as a councillor at the Pasir Gudang City Council (MBPG) from November 2020 to November 2022, representing Zone Scientex 2. During the same period, fellow UMNO Pasir Gudang figure Baharudin Mohamed Taib served as Whip of the MBPG (2020–2021). Baharudin subsequently won the Permas (N.43) state seat in GE15, with both figures emerging as prominent UMNO leaders from the Pasir Gudang division simultaneously active in local governance and state politics.

=== 2022 general election (GE15) ===
In the 15th Malaysian General Election (GE15) held on 19 November 2022, Noor Azleen contested the Pasir Gudang parliamentary seat (P159) under the Barisan Nasional (UMNO) ticket, using the campaign slogan Pasir Gudang KITA PUNYA! ("Pasir Gudang Is Ours!") under the theme of Kestabilan & Kemakmuran (Stability and Prosperity). It was his first contest in a general election. He obtained 37,369 votes (25.03%), finishing third behind the winner Hassan Abdul Karim of Pakatan Harapan (PKR) who polled 71,233 votes (47.72%), and Perikatan Nasional candidate Mohamad Farid Abdul Razak who obtained 39,675 votes (26.58%).

=== Public statements and advocacy ===
As Johor UMNO Youth chief, Noor Azleen has been a regular voice on national issues. In March 2024, he took a notably conciliatory stance on the controversy involving socks printed with the word "Allah", expressing hope that the incident could become a positive opportunity for Malaysians to better understand each other — a position that diverged from the harder line taken by UMNO Youth national leadership at the time.

In April 2024, Johor UMNO Youth divisions under his leadership lodged police reports over a social media post alleged to have insulted the Yang di-Pertuan Agong, Sultan Ibrahim of Johor.

In October 2025, he called on the government and relevant stakeholders to urgently address what he described as a systemic failure in national school safety following a series of serious crimes in schools.

In May 2026, Noor Azleen challenged DAP deputy national chairman Nga Kor Ming to be consistent in his stance on appointed state assemblymen, asserting that if Nga opposed such appointments in Johor, he should equally demand that Pakatan Harapan's appointed assemblymen in Pahang and Sabah resign. The issue attracted further national media coverage, with Free Malaysia Today reporting on his challenge to Nga over the consistency of positions on appointed legislators.

== Electoral record ==
GE15 (2022): P159 Pasir Gudang
Party	Candidate	Votes	%	±%
PH	Hassan Abdul Karim	71,233	47.72	−10.96
BERSATU	Mohamad Farid Abdul Razak	39,675	26.58	+26.58
UMNO	Noor Azleen Ambros	37,369	25.03	−10.10
GTA	Mohammad Raffi Beran	1,003	0.67	+0.67
Majority		31,558	21.14	−2.41
Turnout		150,876	75.21	−10.62
People's Justice Party hold		Swing	{{{swing}}}	
