= Aznan Tamin =

Malaysian politician

Yang Berhormat Tuan Aznan Tamin MLA
- أزنن تمين

Member of the Johor State Executive Council (Education & Information)
- Incumbent
- Assumed office 13 February 2024
- Monarch: Ibrahim Iskandar
- Menteri Besar: Onn Hafiz Ghazi
- Preceded by: Norlizah Noh
- Constituency: Tanjung Surat

Member of the Johor State Legislative Assembly for Tanjung Surat
- Incumbent
- Assumed office 12 March 2022
- Preceded by: Syed Sis Syed Abdul Rahman (BN–UMNO)
- Majority: 5,903 (2022)

Faction represented in the Johor State Legislative Assembly
- 2022 -: Barisan Nasional

Personal details
- Born: Aznan bin Tamin; 1985 (age 40–41) Johor, Malaysia
- Citizenship: Malaysian
- Party: United Malays National Organisation (UMNO)
- Other political affiliations: Barisan Nasional (BN)
- Education: University of Technology MARA (BBA)
- Occupation: Politician
- Aznan Tamin on Facebook

Aznan bin Tamin (Jawi: أزنن تمين, Malay pronunciation: [aznan]) is a Malaysian politician who has served as Member of the Johor State Executive Council (EXCO) in the Barisan Nasional (BN) state administration under Menteri Besar Onn Hafiz Ghazi since February 2024 and the Member of the Johor State Legislative Assembly (MLA) for Tanjung Surat since March 2022. He is a member and the Division Youth Chief of Pengerang of the United Malays National Organisation (UMNO), a component party of the BN coalition.

== Election result ==
Johor State Legislative Assembly
Year	Constituency	Candidate	Votes	Pct	Opponent(s)	Votes	Pct	Ballots cast	Majority	Turnout
2022	N39 Tanjung Surat	Aznan Tamin (UMNO)	9,850	65.46%	Selamat Daud (PAS)	3,947	26.23%	15,048	5,903	59.88%
2022	N39 Tanjung Surat	Aznan Tamin (UMNO)	9,850	65.46%	Rosman Tahir (PKR)	800	5.32%	15,048	5,903	59.88%
2022	N39 Tanjung Surat	Aznan Tamin (UMNO)	9,850	65.46%	Samat Atan (PEJUANG)	110	0.73%	15,048	5,903	59.88%
