= Azalina Othman Said =

Malaysian politician and lawyer (born 1963)

Yang Berhormat Dato' Seri Azalina Othman Said SPMP SSAP DGMK DPMS PGDK PSI II MP
- أزلينا عثمان سعيد
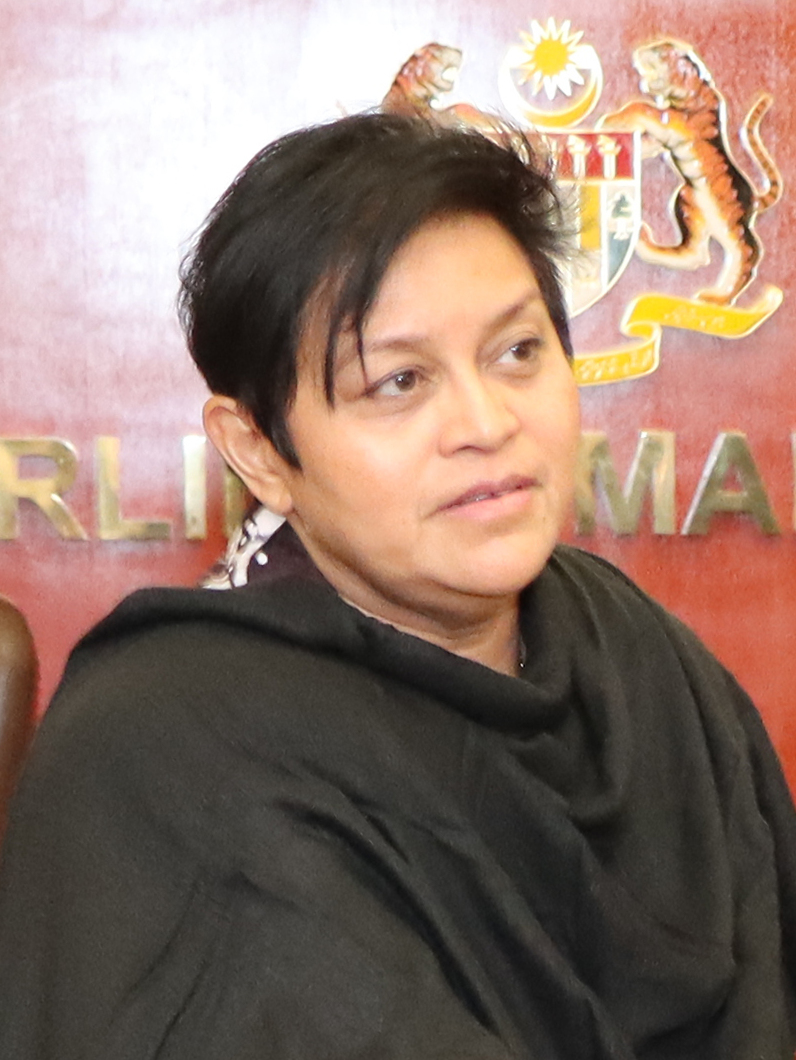
- Azalina in 2023

Minister in the Prime Minister's Department
- Incumbent
- Assumed office 3 December 2022
- Monarchs: Abdullah (2022–2024); Ibrahim Iskandar (since 2024)
- Prime Minister: Anwar Ibrahim
- Deputy: Ramkarpal Singh (2022–2023); M. Kulasegaran (since 2023)
- Preceded by: Wan Junaidi Tuanku Jaafar
- In office 29 July 2015 – 9 May 2018
- Monarchs: Abdul Halim (2015–2016); Muhammad V (2016–2018)
- Prime Minister: Najib Razak
- Deputy: Razali Ibrahim
- Preceded by: Nancy Shukri
- Succeeded by: Liew Vui Keong

Deputy Speaker of the Dewan Rakyat II
- In office 13 July 2020 – 23 August 2021 Serving with Mohd Rashid Hasnon
- Monarch: Abdullah
- Prime Minister: Muhyiddin Yassin (2020–2021); Ismail Sabri Yaakob (2021)
- Speaker: Azhar Azizan Harun
- Preceded by: Nga Kor Ming
- Succeeded by: Alice Lau

Chairperson of the National Film Development Corporation
- In office 1 June 2015 – 29 July 2015
- Minister: Ahmad Shabery Cheek
- Preceded by: Afendi Hamdan
- Succeeded by: Khusairi Abdul Talib

Minister of Tourism
- In office 18 March 2008 – 9 April 2009
- Monarch: Mizan Zainal Abidin
- Prime Minister: Abdullah Ahmad Badawi
- Deputy: Sulaiman Abdul Rahman
- Preceded by: Tengku Adnan
- Succeeded by: Ng Yen Yen

Minister of Youth and Sports
- In office 27 March 2004 – 18 March 2008
- Monarchs: Sirajuddin (2004–2006); Mizan Zainal Abidin (2006–2008)
- Prime Minister: Abdullah Ahmad Badawi
- Deputy: Ong Tee Keat (2004–2006); Liow Tiong Lai (2006–2008)
- Preceded by: Hishammuddin Hussein
- Succeeded by: Ismail Sabri Yaakob
Party leadership
Information Chief of the United Malays National Organisation
Incumbent
Assumed office 22 March 2023
President	Ahmad Zahid Hamidi
Preceded by	Isham Jalil
1st Women Youth Chief of the United Malays National Organisation
In office 9 April 2001 – 25 September 2004
President	Mahathir Mohamad
Deputy	Noraini Ahmad
Preceded by	Position established
Succeeded by	Noraini Ahmad
Parliamentary offices
Member of the Malaysian Parliament for Pengerang
Incumbent
Assumed office 21 March 2004
Preceded by	Position established
Majority	Walkover (2004); Walkover (2008); 26,992 (2013); 21,829 (2018); 21,738 (2022)

Personal details
- Born: 31 December 1963 (age 62) Johor Bahru, Johor, Malaysia
- Party: UMNO (1990–present)
- Relations: Sheikh Abdullah Ahmad (uncle)
- Education: Universiti Teknologi Mara; University of Malaya (LLB); London School of Economics and Political Science (LLM)
- Occupation: Lawyer; politician

Azalina binti Othman Said (Note: Jawi: ازلينا بنت عثمان سعيد) (born 31 December 1963) is a Malaysian politician and lawyer who has served as the Member of Parliament for Pengerang since 2004 and as Minister in the Prime Minister's Department since 2022.

Azalina was born on 31 December 1963 in Johor Bahru, grew up in Penang and comes from a mixed Buginese and Hadrami Arab heritage. She pursued legal and public administration studies, earning degrees from Universiti Teknologi MARA, the University of Malaya, International Islamic University Malaysia, and the London School of Economics. Azalina began her legal career as a legal assistant at Messrs Raja Darryl & Loh in 1988, was admitted to the Malaysian Bar in 1989, and joined UMNO in 1990. She specialised in women's affairs, civil claims, and corporate banking, becoming a partner at Azalina Chan & Chia in 1994 and later at Messrs Skine and Zaid Ibrahim & Co., including its Singapore branch. In 2000, she was elected to the UMNO Supreme Council, becoming the youngest woman to hold the position.

Azalina served as founding head of Puteri UMNO from 2001 to 2004, focusing on recruiting young professional Malay women. In 2004, she won the Pengerang parliamentary seat unopposed and was appointed Malaysia's first female Minister of Youth and Sports, serving until 2008, before becoming Minister of Tourism in 2008–2009. Despite a Malaysian Anti-Corruption Commission investigation in 2009 and being dropped from the cabinet under Najib Razak, she continued her political career, defending her parliamentary seat in subsequent elections and holding roles such as chairperson of the Parliamentary Women's Caucus, chairman of National Film Development Corporation Malaysia, and non-executive director of Chemical Company of Malaysia.

Azalina returned to the cabinet in 2015 as Minister in the Prime Minister's Department, overseeing legal affairs, and publicly supported Najib during the 1MDB scandal, attracting debate. Azalina later served as the first female Deputy Speaker of the Dewan Rakyat from 2020 to 2021 and as Special Advisor to the Prime Minister on Law and Human Rights from 2021 to 2022. In the 2022 general election, she retained her Pengerang seat and was appointed Minister of Law and Institutional Reform, pledging to modernise outdated laws, and in 2024 became the first Malaysian president of the International Anti-Corruption Academy's Assembly of Parties.

== Early life and education ==
Azalina was born on 31 December 1963 in Johor Bahru. She spent her early years in Penang, where she received her elementary education at Convent Green Lane, a Catholic school. Her father is of Buginese descent, with ancestors from South Sulawesi who settled in Johor. Her mother is of Hadrami Arab descent from Yemen. Her maternal uncle is Sheikh Abdullah Ahmad, a Malaysian-French singer.

She obtained a Diploma in Public Administration at Universiti Teknologi MARA and later completed a Bachelor of Laws (Honours) at the University of Malaya in 1988. She also obtained a Diploma in Syariah Law from the International Islamic University Malaysia. In 1990, she earned a Master of Laws degree from the London School of Economics and Political Science in the United Kingdom.

== Legal career ==
Azalina began her career in law as a legal assistant in Messrs Raja Darryl & Loh between 1988 and 1989. She was admitted to the Malaysian Bar Council in 1989. She became a member of UMNO in 1990, when she was 27 years old.

She returned to Messrs Raja Darryl & Loh between 1991 and 1994. She specialised in women's affairs as a special advisor to the government, as well as civil claims and corporate and commercial banking. She became a partner of law firm Azalina Chan & Chia in 1994 and held this position until 2001. During this period in 2000, she was elected to the UMNO Supreme Council and became the youngest woman to ever hold this position. (Note: Azalina's work as a lawyer and a talk show host who addressed controversial subjects with a straightforward interviewing manner initially brought her to the attention of UMNO leaders.) She shifted from Azalina Chan & Chia to Messrs Skine between 2001 and 2002. She has been a partner at Messrs Zaid Ibrahim & Co. since 2002, and starting in 2003, she was a partner at Zaid Ibrahim & Co. LLP in Singapore.

== Political career ==
=== Early career (2001–2015) ===
During her time practicing law, Azalina also influenced her political career. On 1 April 2001, she was appointed the founding head of Puteri UMNO, a youth wing for young women, and later the first approved head of Puteri UMNO, serving from 1 November 2002 to 2004. As the head of Puteri UMNO, she automatically became one of the six vice presidents of UMNO. Under her leadership, the wing focused on recruiting female members under 35, targeting younger, professional Malay women by leveraging a highly visible figure from the entertainment industry, which led to the selection of singer, actor, and model Erra Fazira. In 2002, rumours emerged accusing Azalina of having a lesbian relationship and abusing her power; these online accusations reflected homophobic and moralistic attitudes aimed at her strong, unconventional, and 'unfeminine' image. Despite these unproven claims, she did not face the same harsh treatment or legal consequences that Deputy Prime Minister Anwar Ibrahim endured.

In the 2004 general election, Azalina won the Pengerang parliamentary seat unopposed. Following her successes, Prime Minister Abdullah Ahmad Badawi appointed her on 31 March 2004 as Malaysia's first-ever female Minister of Youth and Sports. Later that year, on 14 May, she remarked that many youths sought career shortcuts, a point reflected in differing media headlines emphasising the link between career and success. She completed her tenure as Minister of Youth and Sports on 7 March 2008. After the 2008 general election, when Barisan Nasional (BN) suffered significant electoral losses, Abdullah reshuffled the cabinet, moving her to a different portfolio.

Azalina Othman was appointed Minister of Tourism on 18 March 2008. In 2009, she emphasised that all Malaysians should recognise Malaysia as a "tourist star" and share equal responsibility in maintaining the country's tourism products and facilities, positioning citizens as ambassadors of a commoditised Malaysia while leaving broader social and cultural issues tied to national branding unaddressed. That same year, she was a candidate for the UMNO supreme council and was subject to a Malaysian Anti-Corruption Commission raid after her political secretary was found with RM75,000 suspected to be linked to vote buying. Azalina was dropped from the cabinet when Najib Razak became prime minister in April 2009, signalling a generational change in his administration, and she completed her tenure on 9 April.

In the 2013 general election, Azalina defended her Pengerang seat with 26,992 votes out of 37,999 eligible voters, defeating Tunku Intan Tunku Abdul Hamid. That same year, she managed parliamentary affairs while serving as chairperson of the Parliamentary Women's Caucus. She became a non-independent, non-executive director of the Chemical Company of Malaysia (CCM) on 13 November 2013. Shortly after taking office as chairman of the National Film Development Corporation Malaysia (FINAS) on 1 June 2015, Azalina urged regional filmmakers to incorporate national issues into their works, regardless of genre.

=== Minister in the Prime Minister's Department (2015–2018) ===
Following a cabinet reshuffle in July 2015, Azalina resigned as chairman of CCM on 28 July and rejoined the cabinet the next day as Minister in the Prime Minister's Department, marking her return to ministerial office after a six-year absence. She also announced her resignation as chairman of FINAS after her reappointment. Azalina revealed that she learned about her new ministerial appointment through a radio broadcast while in her constituency.

In March 2016, during public concern over the 1MDB scandal, Azalina expressed support for then-Prime Minister Najib Razak by tweeting, "I am from #Johor, and I #RespectMyPM," along with her state flag. This statement led to online debate, with many Malaysians criticising Najib's leadership and disagreeing with her position. The hashtag #RespectMyPM became a top trend on Twitter, reflecting the divide between Najib's supporters and opponents. On 28 June 2016, Azalina was appointed Minister in the Prime Minister's Department responsible for Legal Affairs, taking over from Nancy Shukri. In the 2018 general election, she successfully defended her Pengerang seat, winning 21,829 votes against her closest rival from Bersatu, Norliza Ngadiran, who received 10,412 votes.

=== Deputy Speaker of the Dewan Rakyat (2020–2021) ===
On 13 July 2020, Azalina was appointed as the first woman Deputy Speaker of the Dewan Rakyat following a motion by Prime Minister Muhyiddin Yassin. She resigned from the position on 23 August 2021, citing ethical, personal, and political reasons, including a conflict between her role in the ruling coalition and her membership in the UMNO Supreme Council. She also expressed concern that the lack of collective decision-making in the Dewan Rakyat affected her ability to perform her duties impartially and effectively.

=== Special Advisor on Law and Human Rights (2021–2022) ===
On 2 October 2021, Azalina was appointed Special Advisor to the Prime Minister on Law and Human Rights by Prime Minister Ismail Sabri Yaakob. On 27 August 2022, she criticised the prime minister for not appointing a new Attorney General (AG), arguing that the AG should align with the prime minister due to the position’s significant powers. She also questioned the Federal Court's rejection of Najib's request to delay his trial and suggested that more UMNO leaders could face prosecution under the current AG. Her remarks, made during an UMNO meeting, led to calls for her resignation from Pakatan Harapan's Ngeh Koo Ham, who said her comments undermined the rule of law. Azalina resigned as the prime minister’s special adviser on law and human rights, submitting her resignation on 29 August 2022 with a one-month notice period, during which she was on leave and did not work at the Prime Minister's Department. In the 2022 general election, Azalina retained her Pengerang seat under Barisan National, securing 21,738 votes.

=== Minister of Law and Institutional Reform (2022–present) ===
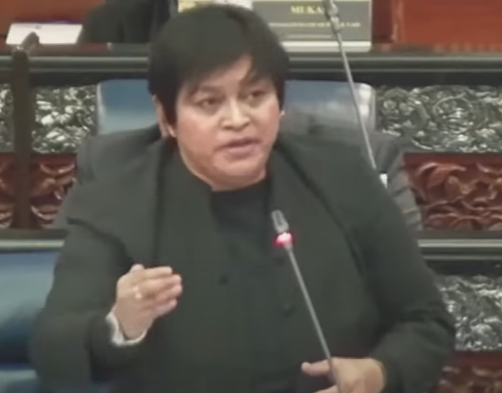
Azalina speaking during a session in the Dewan Rakyat, 2022

On 3 December 2022, Azalina, as the newly appointed Minister of Law and Institutional Reform, pledged to review and amend outdated laws to ensure they remain relevant. On 30 October 2024, she was appointed president of the 13th session of the Assembly of Parties of the International Anti-Corruption Academy, marking the first time Malaysia has held this position.

== Personal life ==
Azalina has an interest in taekwondo and holds a black belt.

== Electoral history ==
Parliament of Malaysia
Year	Constituency	Candidate	Votes	Pct	Opponent(s)	Votes	Pct	Ballots cast	Majority	Turnout
2004	P157 Pengerang	Azalina Othman Said (UMNO)	Unopposed							
2008	P157 Pengerang	Azalina Othman Said (UMNO)	Unopposed							
2013	P157 Pengerang	Azalina Othman Said (UMNO)	26,992	83.64%	Tengku Intan Tengku Abd Hamid (PKR)	4,484	13.89%	33,067	22,508	87.02%
2013	P157 Pengerang	Azalina Othman Said (UMNO)	26,992	83.64%	Mohd Azaman Johari (IND)	795	2.46%	33,067	22,508	87.02%
2018	P157 Pengerang	Azalina Othman Said (UMNO)	21,829	67.71%	Norliza Ngadiran (BERSATU)	10,412	32.29%	33,580	11,417	82.96%
2022	P157 Pengerang	Azalina Othman Said (UMNO)	21,738	51.96%	Fairulnizar Rahmat (BERSATU)	16,728	39.98%	41,840	5,010	75.64%
2022	P157 Pengerang	Azalina Othman Said (UMNO)	21,738	51.96%	Che Zakaria Mohd Salleh (AMANAH)	3,374	8.06%	41,840	5,010	75.64%

== Awards and honours ==
=== Awards ===
Azalina has received several awards and recognitions throughout her career. In 2003, she was named a Global Leader for Tomorrow by the World Economic Forum. In 2008, she received the Women and Sport Award from the International Olympic Committee. From 2016 to 2018, she served as the Mentor Minister for UM, and she was awarded an Honorary Doctorate by the University of Southern Queensland. In 2024, she received the Global Islamic Finance Awards Special Award for her leadership in legislative and institutional reforms related to Islamic finance, particularly in arbitration reform.

=== Honours ===
- Johor
  - Second Class of the Sultan Ibrahim of Johor Medal (PSI II) (2026)
- Kedah
  - Knight Commander of the Glorious Order of the Crown of Kedah (DGMK) – Dato' Wira (2006)
- Pahang
  - Knight Grand Companion of the Order of Sultan Ahmad Shah of Pahang (SSAP) – Dato' Sri (2007)
- Perak
  - Knight Grand Commander of the Order of the Perak State Crown (SPMP) – Dato' Seri (2007)
- Sabah
  - Commander of the Order of Kinabalu (PGDK) – Datuk (2003)
- Selangor
  - Knight Commander of the Order of the Crown of Selangor (DPMS) – Datin Paduka (2005)
