= Baharudin =

Baharudin is a Malaysian name that may refer to the following notable people:

Given name

- Baharudin bin Mohamed Taib (born 1965), Malaysian politician

Surname

- Feroz Baharudin (born 2000), Malaysian football player
- Safuwan Baharudin (born 1991), Singaporean football player
