= Federal-State Relations Select Committee =

Committee appointed by the Malaysian House of Representatives

The Federal-State Relations Select Committee (Malay: Jawatankuasa Pilihan Khas Hubungan Antara Negeri-Negeri dan Persekutuan; Chinese: 馬來西亞聯邦和州關係專責委員會; Tamil: மலேசிய கூட்டாட்சி மற்றும் மாநில உறவுகள் தேர்வுக் குழு) is a select committee of the Malaysian House of Representatives. It is among six new bipartisan parliamentary select committees announced by Speaker of the House of Representatives, Mohamad Ariff Md Yusof, on 4 December 2018 in an effort to improve the institutional system.

== Membership ==
=== 14th Parliament ===
As of December 2020, the Committee's current members are as follows:

Member	Party	Constituency
Hassan Abdul Karim MP (Chairman)	PKR	Pasir Gudang
Jalaluddin Alias MP	UMNO	Jelebu
Ali Biju MP	PPBM	Saratok
Foong Hin Chan MP	DAP	Kota Kinabalu
Aaron Ago Dagang MP	PRS	Kanowit
Rozman Isli MP	WARISAN	Labuan
Alice Kiong Yieng Lau MP	DAP	Lanang

Former members of the committee are as follows:

Member	Party	Constituency	Successor
Mahdzir Khalid MP	UMNO	Padang Terap	Jalaluddin Alias
Nancy Shukri MP	PBB	Batang Sadong	Aaron Ago Dagang

== Chair of the Federal-State Relations Select Committee ==
Chair	Party	Constituency	First elected	Method
Hassan Abdul Karim	PKR	Pasir Gudang	4 December 2018	Appointed by the Speaker of the House of Representatives

== See also ==
- Parliamentary Committees of Malaysia
