= Che Zakaria Mohd Salleh =

Malaysian politician (1961–2025)

Yang Berbahagia Dato' Che Zakaria Mohd Salleh DIMP
- چئ زكريا محمد صالح

Member of the Johor State Legislative Assembly for Permas
- In office 9 May 2018 – 12 March 2022
- Preceded by: Mohamed Khaled Nordin (BN–UMNO)
- Succeeded by: Baharudin Mohamed Taib (BN–UMNO)
- Majority: 8,762 (2018)

Chairman of the Southeast Johor Development Authority
- In office 1 May 2020 – 30 April 2022
- Preceded by: Mohamed Khaled Nordin
- Succeeded by: Onn Hafiz Ghazi

Personal details
- Born: Che Zakaria bin Mohd Salleh; 1961
- Died: 26 August 2025 (aged 64) Johor Bahru, Johor, Malaysia
- Citizenship: Malaysian
- Party: Malaysian United Indigenous Party (BERSATU) (–2022); National Trust Party (AMANAH) (since 2022)
- Other political affiliations: Pakatan Harapan (PH) (–2020 & 2022–2025); Perikatan Nasional (PN) (2020–2022)
- Occupation: Politician

Che Zakaria bin Mohd Salleh (1961 – 26 August 2025) was a Malaysian politician who served as Member of the Johor State Legislative Assembly (MLA) for Permas from May 2018 to March 2022. He was a member of the National Trust Party (AMANAH), a component party of the Pakatan Harapan (PH) coalition. He was a member of the Malaysian United Indigenous Party (BERSATU), a component party of the Perikatan Nasional (PN) coalition and formerly PH coalition. He also served as the Chairman of Southeast Johor Development Authority (KEJORA) from May 2020 to April 2022 and also member of Board of Director of Johor Port. Salleh died on 26 August 2025, at the age of 64.

== Political career (2018–2025) ==
=== Member of the Johor State Legislative Assembly for Permas (2018–2022) ===
==== Nomination, surprising victory and election in the 2018 Johor state election ====
Che Zakaria was nominated by BERSATU, then a component party of the PH opposition coalition to contest the Permas state seat in the 2018 Johor state election by challenging Mohamed Khaled Nordin, then Menteri Besar of Johor and Permas MLA. He defeated Khaled Nordin and replaced him as the new Permas MLA, the victory by Che Zakaria is considered one of the biggest surprises in the election as a Menteri Besar, the head of state government of Johor and highest-ranking politician in Johor is usually hard to be defeated in any elections given that Menteri Besar usually has higher popularity than the challenger.

==== Renomination denial and stepping down in the 2022 Johor state election ====
However, Che Zakaria was neither renominated by BERSATU, then a component party of PN after it left PH in February 2020, nor by any other political parties or coalitions, to contest in the 2022 Johor state election. His seat was then won by another candidate namely Baharudin Mohamed Taib from the United Malays National Organisation (UMNO), a component party of the ruling Barisan Nasional (BN) coalition and Che Zakaria handed over the position of Permas MLA to the winner Baharudin.

=== Member of the Johor State Legislative Assembly for Permas (2022–2025) ===
==== Crossover from BERSATU to AMANAH ====
On 23 July 2022, Che Zakaria announced his departure from BERSATU and joining of AMANAH. He cited the difficulties to serve the people as a BERSATU member. He also hinted that two other BERSATU former Johor MLAs, including a former member of the Johor State Executive Council (EXCO) were also expected to do the same as him. AMANAH deputy president Salahuddin Ayub noted that Che Zakaria did so willingly, sincerely and timely without any other motives and expectations other than agreeing with the principles and ideologies of AMANAH as he did not do so before the nomination day of the 2022 Johor state election on 26 February 2022 merely to secure a nomination from AMANAH to attempt to carry on his political career as an MLA after he was denied a nomination by his former party BERSATU. Salahuddin also revealed that the role Che Zakaria would play in Johor AMANAH was going to be refined not long after.

== Election results ==
Parliament of Malaysia
Year	Constituency	Candidate	Votes	Pct	Opponent(s)	Votes	Pct	Ballots cast	Majority	Turnout
2022	P157 Pengerang	Che Zakaria Mohd Salleh (AMANAH)	3,374	8.06%	Azalina Othman Said (UMNO)	21,758	51.98%	42,288	5,030	76.40%
2022	P157 Pengerang	Che Zakaria Mohd Salleh (AMANAH)	3,374	8.06%	Fairulnizar Rahmat (BERSATU)	16,728	39.96%	42,288	5,030	76.40%

Johor State Legislative Assembly
Year	Constituency	Candidate	Vote	Pct	Opponent(s)	Vote	Pct	Ballots cast	Majority	Turnout
2018	N43 Permas	Che Zakaria Mohd Salleh (BERSATU)	28,793	53.39%	Mohamed Khaled Nordin (UMNO)	20,047	37.17%	53,929	8,762	85.48%
2018	N43 Permas	Che Zakaria Mohd Salleh (BERSATU)	28,793	53.39%	Ab. Aziz Abdullah (PAS)	4,181	7.75%	53,929	8,762	85.48%
2018	N43 Permas	Che Zakaria Mohd Salleh (BERSATU)	28,793	53.39%	Rohani Yaacob (IND)	113	0.21%	53,929	8,762	85.48%

== Honours ==
- Pahang
  - Knight Companion of the Order of the Crown of Pahang (DIMP) – Dato'
