= Pasir Gudang (federal constituency) =

Federal constituency in Johor, Malaysia

Pasir Gudang (P159)
Johor constituency

Federal constituency
- Legislature: Dewan Rakyat
- MP: Hassan Abdul Karim; PH
- Constituency created: 2003
- First contested: 2004
- Last contested: 2022

Demographics
- Population (2023): 534,659
- Electors (2026): 211,648
- Area (km²): 148
- Pop. density (per km²): 3,612.6

Pasir Gudang is a federal constituency in Johor Bahru District, Johor, Malaysia, that has been represented in the Dewan Rakyat since 2004.

The federal constituency was created in the 2003 redistribution and is mandated to return a single member to the Dewan Rakyat under the first past the post voting system.

== Demographics ==
Ethnic breakdown of Pasir Gudang's electorate as of 2026
1. Malay (45.1%)
2. Chinese (35.2%)
3. Indian (9.90%)
4. Other ethnicities (9.80%)

As of 2020, Pasir Gudang has a population of 360,621 people.

Age breakdown of Pasir Gudang's electorate as of 2022
1. 18-20 (7.59%)
2. 21-29 (24.5%)
3. 30-39 (21.5%)
4. 40-49 (17.7%)
5. 50-59 (15.8%)
6. 60-69 (9.04%)
7. 70-79 (3.01%)
8. 80-89 (0.70%)
9. above 90 (0.11%)
Gender breakdown of Pasir Gudang's electorate as of 2022
1. Male (50.6%)
2. Female (49.4%)

== History ==
=== Polling districts ===
According to the gazette issued on 2 July 2026, the Pasir Gudang constituency has a total of 42 polling districts.

State constituency	Polling districts	Code	Location
Johor Jaya（N42）	Pandan	159/42/01	SA Kg Melayu Pandan
Johor Jaya（N42）	Taman Molek	159/42/02	SK Taman Molek
Johor Jaya（N42）	Johor Jaya Barat	159/42/03	SK Taman Johor Jaya 1; SMA Johor Bahru
Johor Jaya（N42）	Johor Jaya Selatan	159/42/04	SJK (C) Johor Jaya
Johor Jaya（N42）	Johor Jaya Timor	159/42/05	SMK Taman Johor Jaya (1)
Johor Jaya（N42）	Johor Jaya Tengah	159/42/06	SA Taman Johor Jaya
Johor Jaya（N42）	Johor Jaya Utara	159/42/07	SMK Taman Johor Jaya 2; SK Taman Johor Jaya 5
Johor Jaya（N42）	Bandar Plentong Utara	159/42/08	SJK (C) Chien Chi
Johor Jaya（N42）	Bandar Plentong Selatan	159/42/09	SA Tun Hussein Onn Plentong; SJK (C) Chien Chi; Dewan Raya Plentong
Johor Jaya（N42）	Taman Saujana	159/42/10	SA Taman Molek
Johor Jaya（N42）	Plentong	159/42/11	Dewan Raya Plentong; SJK (C) Chien Chi
Johor Jaya（N42）	Masai	159/42/12	SMK Dato' Penggawa Timur; SK Seri Alam 2
Johor Jaya（N42）	Teratai	159/42/13	SK Taman Johor Jaya 3
Johor Jaya（N42）	Keembong	159/42/14	SK Taman Johor Jaya 2
Johor Jaya（N42）	Seri Alam	159/42/15	Dewan Raya Bandar Seri Alam
Johor Jaya（N42）	Molek Harmoni	159/42/16	SMK Taman Molek
Johor Jaya（N42）	Tasek Seri Alam	159/42/17	SMK Bandar Seri Alam; SA Bandar Seri Alam
Johor Jaya（N42）	Belantik	159/42/18	SK Sri Amar
Johor Jaya（N42）	Sri Amar	159/42/19	Dewan Badminton Sri Amar
Permas（N43）	Bandar Masai Utara	159/43/01	SJK (T) Masai
Permas（N43）	Bandar Masai Tengah	159/43/02	SK Masai
Permas（N43）	Bandar Masai Selatan	159/43/03	SJK (C) Masai
Permas（N43）	Permas	159/43/04	SK Permas Jaya 1
Permas（N43）	Permas Jaya	159/43/05	SMK Permas Jaya
Permas（N43）	Senibong	159/43/06	SK Permas Jaya 4
Permas（N43）	Taman Kota Puteri	159/43/07	SK Seri Kota Puteri
Permas（N43）	Kampong Telok Jawa	159/43/08	SJK (C) Chee Tong
Permas（N43）	Rinting Cendana	159/43/09	SK Taman Rinting 1
Permas（N43）	Taman Mawar	159/43/10	SMK Pasir Gudang 2; SA Taman Mawar; Dewan Terbuka Kg. Pasir Gudang Baru; Tabika KEMAS Kg. Pasir Gudang Baru
Permas（N43）	Pasir Gudang	159/43/11	SK Taman Cendana; SA Taman Cendana
Permas（N43）	Pelabuhan Pasir Gudang	159/43/12	SK Pasir Gudang (2)
Permas（N43）	Taman Air Biru	159/43/13	SK Pasir Gudang 3
Permas（N43）	Rumah Pangsa PKENJ	159/43/14	SA Pasir Gudang 2; SMK Pasir Gudang
Permas（N43）	Permas 2	159/43/15	SK Taman Permas Jaya 2
Permas（N43）	Taman Megah Ria	159/43/16	SMK Taman Megah Ria
Permas（N43）	Rinting Meranti	159/43/17	SA Taman Rinting
Permas（N43）	Rinting Balau	159/43/18	SMK Taman Rinting 2
Permas（N43）	Nusa Damai	159/43/19	SK Taman Nusa Damai
Permas（N43）	Taman Bukit Dahlia	159/43/20	SK Taman Bukit Dahlia
Permas（N43）	Bandar Baru Permas Jaya	159/43/21	SK Taman Permas Jaya 3
Permas（N43）	Kampong Plentong Baru	159/43/22	Tadika Kemas Kg. Plentong Baru
Permas（N43）	Taman Scientex	159/43/23	SK Taman Scientex; SMK Taman Scientex

=== Representation history ===
Members of Parliament for Pasir Gudang
Parliament	No	Years	Member	Party	Vote Share
Constituency created from Tebrau
11th	P159	2004–2008	Mohamed Khaled Nordin (محمد خالد نورالدين)	BN (UMNO)	38,123; 84.48%
12th	P159	2008–2013	Mohamed Khaled Nordin (محمد خالد نورالدين)	BN (UMNO)	35,849; 65.88%
13th	P159	2013–2018	Normala Abdul Samad (نورملاء عبدالصمد)	BN (UMNO)	43,834; 50.54%
14th	P159	2018–2022	Hassan Abdul Karim (حسن بن عبد الكريم)	PH (PKR)	61,165; 58.68%
15th	P159	2022–present	Hassan Abdul Karim (حسن بن عبد الكريم)	PH (PKR)	71,233; 47.72%

=== State constituency ===
Parliamentary constituency	State constituency						
Parliamentary constituency	1954–59*	1959–1974	1974–1986	1986–1995	1995–2004	2004–2018	2018–present
Pasir Gudang						Johor Jaya	
Pasir Gudang						Permas	

=== Historical boundaries ===
State Constituency	Area	
State Constituency	2003	2018
Johor Jaya	Ehsan Jaya; Pandan; Plentong; Seri Alam; Taman Rinting	Johor Jaya; Pandan; Plentong; Seri Alam; Taman Molek
Permas	Masai; Pasir Gudang; Permas Jaya; Senibong; Taman Mawar	Masai; Pasir Gudang; Permas Jaya; Senibong; Taman Rinting

=== Current state assembly members ===
No.	State Constituency	Member	Coalition (Party)
N42	Johor Jaya	Chan San San	BN (MCA)
N43	Permas	Baharudin Mohamed Taib	BN (UMNO)

=== Local governments & postcodes ===
No.	State Constituency	Local Government	Postcode
N42	Johor Jaya	Pasir Gudang City Council (Masai area); Johor Bahru City Council	81100 Johor Bahru; 81700 Pasir Gudang; 81750 Masai
N43	Permas	Pasir Gudang City Council; Johor Bahru City Council (Permas Jaya and Teluk Jawa areas)	81100 Johor Bahru; 81700 Pasir Gudang; 81750 Masai

== Election results ==
Malaysian general election, 2022
Party	Candidate	Votes	%	∆%
PH	Hassan Abdul Karim	71,233	47.72	▲47.72
PN	Mohamad Farid Abdul Razak	39,675	26.58	▲26.58
BN	Noor Azleen Ambros	37,369	25.03	▼10.10
PEJUANG	Mohammad Rafi Beran	1,003	0.67	▲0.67
Total valid votes		149,280	100.00	
Total rejected ballots		1,298		
Unreturned ballots		298		
Turnout		150,876	75.21	▼10.62
Registered electors		198,485		
Majority		31,558	21.14	▼2.41
PH hold		Swing		
Source(s) https://lom.agc.gov.my/ilims/upload/portal/akta/outputp/1753254/PUB%20617%20PARLIMEN%20JOHOR.pdf

Malaysian general election, 2018
Party	Candidate	Votes	%	∆%
PKR	Hassan Abdul Karim	61,615	58.68	▲9.22
BN	Mohamed Khaled Nordin	36,889	35.13	▼15.27
PAS	Ab Aziz Abdullah	6,278	5.98	▲5.98
Independent	Sey Jock @ Chee Jock	227	0.21	▲0.21
Total valid votes		105,009	100.00	
Total rejected ballots		1,342		
Unreturned ballots		225		
Turnout		106,576	85.83	▼1.81
Registered electors		124,172		
Majority		24,726	23.55	▲22.57
PKR gain from BN		Swing		?
Source(s) "His Majesty's Government Gazette - Notice of Contested Election, Parliament for the State of Johore [P.U. (B) 244/2018]" (PDF). Attorney General's Chambers of Malaysia. 3 May 2018. Archived from the original (PDF) on 29 December 2019. "Federal Government Gazette - Results of Contested Election and Statements of the Poll after the Official Addition of Votes, Parliamentary Constituencies for the State of Johore [P.U. (B) 318/2018]" (PDF). Attorney General's Chambers of Malaysia. 28 May 2018.

Malaysian general election, 2013
Party	Candidate	Votes	%	∆%
BN	Normala Abdul Samad	43,834	50.54	▼15.34
PKR	Ahmad Faidhi Saidi	42,899	49.46	▲15.34
Total valid votes		86,733	100.00	
Total rejected ballots		1,704		
Unreturned ballots		113		
Turnout		88,550	87.64	▼10.93
Registered electors		101,041		
Majority		935	0.98	▼30.78
BN hold		Swing		
Source(s) "Federal Government Gazette - Notice of Contested Election, Parliament for the State of Johore [P.U. (B) 181/2013]" (PDF). Attorney General's Chambers of Malaysia. 26 April 2013. "Federal Government Gazette - Results of Contested Election and Statements of the Poll after the Official Addition of Votes, Parliamentary Constituencies for the State of Johore [P.U. (B) 222/2013]" (PDF). Attorney General's Chambers of Malaysia. 22 May 2013.

Malaysian general election, 2008
Party	Candidate	Votes	%	∆%
BN	Mohamed Khaled Nordin	35,849	65.88	▼18.60
PKR	Md Rizan Mohd Saman	18,568	34.12	▲18.60
Total valid votes		54,417	100.00	
Total rejected ballots		1,211		
Unreturned ballots		263		
Turnout		55,891	76.71	▼1.22
Registered electors		72,862		
Majority		17,281	31.76	▼37.20
BN hold		Swing		

Malaysian general election, 2004
Party	Candidate	Votes	%
BN	Mohamed Khaled Nordin	38,123	84.48
PKR	A. Razak Ahmad	7,002	15.52
Total valid votes		45,125	100.00
Total rejected ballots		907	
Unreturned ballots		146	
Turnout		46,178	75.49
Registered electors		61,171	
Majority		31,121	68.96
This was a new constituency created.
