= Pengerang (federal constituency) =

Federal constituency in Johor, Malaysia

Pengerang (P157)
Johor constituency

Federal constituency
- Legislature: Dewan Rakyat
- MP: Azalina Othman Said; BN
- Constituency created: 2003
- First contested: 2004
- Last contested: 2022

Demographics
- Population (2020): 70,831
- Electors (2026): 58,055
- Area (km²): 885
- Pop. density (per km²): 80

Pengerang is a federal constituency in Kota Tinggi District, Johor, Malaysia, that has been represented in the Dewan Rakyat since 2004.

The federal constituency was created in the 2003 redistribution and is mandated to return a single member to the Dewan Rakyat under the first past the post voting system.

== Demographics ==
Ethnic breakdown of Pengerang's electorate as of 2022
1. Malay (90.8%)
2. Chinese (8.20%)
3. Indian (0.60%)
4. Other ethnicities (0.40%)

As of 2020, Pengerang has a population of 70,831 people.

Age breakdown of Pengerang's electorate as of 2022
1. 18-20 (5.47%)
2. 21-29 (18.1%)
3. 30-39 (25.2%)
4. 40-49 (22.2%)
5. 50-59 (10.9%)
6. 60-69 (8.85%)
7. 70-79 (7.60%)
8. 80-89 (1.33%)
9. above 90 (0.36%)
Gender breakdown of Pengerang's electorate as of 2022
1. Male (50.4%)
2. Female (49.6%)

== History ==
=== Polling districts ===
According to the gazette issued on 2 July 2026, the Pengerang constituency has a total of 25 polling districts.

State constituency	Polling districts	Code	Location
Penawar（N38）	Air Tawar 1	157/38/01	SK (FELDA) Air Tawar 1
Penawar（N38）	Air Tawar 4	157/38/02	SK (FELDA) Air Tawar 4
Penawar（N38）	Papan Timor	157/38/03	SMK Bandar Mas
Penawar（N38）	Penawar	157/38/04	SK Bandar Penawar
Penawar（N38）	Sungai Mas	157/38/05	SK LKTP Sungai Mas
Penawar（N38）	Bandar Mas	157/38/06	SK Bandar Mas
Penawar（N38）	Air Tawar 5	157/38/07	SK (FELDA) Air Tawar 5
Penawar（N38）	Semenchu	157/38/08	SK (FELDA) Semenchu
Penawar（N38）	Sungai Layau	157/38/09	SK Kampong Layau
Penawar（N38）	Tanjong Buai	157/38/10	SK Tanjong Buai
Tanjung Surat（N39）	Tanjong Surat	157/39/01	SK Tanjung Surat
Tanjung Surat（N39）	Tanjong Serindit	157/39/02	SA Tanjung Serindit
Tanjung Surat（N39）	Adela	157/39/03	SK (FELDA) Adela
Tanjung Surat（N39）	Bukit Tunggal	157/39/04	SK LKTP Kledang
Tanjung Surat（N39）	Sening	157/39/05	SK (FELDA) Sening
Tanjung Surat（N39）	Bukit Keledang	157/39/06	SMK Adela
Tanjung Surat（N39）	Ladang Santi	157/39/07	SK Kg. Baru Pasir Gogok
Tanjung Surat（N39）	Kampong Pasir Gogok	157/39/08	SK Kg. Baru Pasir Gogok
Tanjung Surat（N39）	Pengerang	157/39/09	SMK Tanjung Pengelih
Tanjung Surat（N39）	Kampong Jawa	157/39/10	SA Sungai Rengit
Tanjung Surat（N39）	Kampong Sungai Kapal	157/39/11	SA Sungai Rengit
Tanjung Surat（N39）	Lepau	157/39/12	SK Lepau
Tanjung Surat（N39）	Sungai Rengit	157/39/13	SJK (C) Yok Poon; SK Sungai Rengit
Tanjung Surat（N39）	Pekan Sungai Rengit	157/39/14	SJK (C) Yok Poon; SA Sungai Rengit
Tanjung Surat（N39）	Telok Ramunia	157/39/15	SK Telok Ramunia

=== Representation history ===
Members of Parliament for Pengerang
Parliament	No	Years	Member	Party	Vote Share
Constituency created from Kota Tinggi
11th	P157	2004–2008	Azalina Othman Said (ازلينا عثمان سعيد)	BN (UMNO)	Uncontested
12th	P157	2008–2013	Azalina Othman Said (ازلينا عثمان سعيد)	BN (UMNO)	Uncontested
13th	P157	2013–2018	Azalina Othman Said (ازلينا عثمان سعيد)	BN (UMNO)	26,992; 83.64%
14th	P157	2018–2022	Azalina Othman Said (ازلينا عثمان سعيد)	BN (UMNO)	21,829; 67.71%
15th	P157	2022–present	Azalina Othman Said (ازلينا عثمان سعيد)	BN (UMNO)	21,758; 51.98%

=== State constituency ===
Parliamentary constituency	State constituency						
Parliamentary constituency	1954–59*	1959–1974	1974–1986	1986–1995	1995–2004	2004–2018	2018–present
Pengerang						Penawar	
Pengerang						Tanjong Surat	
Pengerang							Tanjung Surat

=== Historical boundaries ===
State Constituency	Area	
State Constituency	2003	2018
Penawar	Desaru; FELDA Air Tawar 1, 4 & 5; FELDA Semanchu; Penawar; Tanjung Blau	
Tanjung Surat	FELDA Adela; Pengerang; Tanjung Surat; Tanjung Pengelih; Teluk Ramunia	

=== Current state assembly members ===
No.	State Constituency	Member	Coalition (Party)
N38	Penawar	Fauziah Misri	BN (UMNO)
N39	Tanjung Surat	Aznan Tamin	BN (UMNO)

=== Local governments & postcodes ===
No.	State Constituency	Local Government	Postcode
N38	Penawar	Pengerang Municipal Council	81600 Pengerang; 81900 Kota Tinggi; 81930 Bandar Penawar
N39	Tanjung Surat	Pengerang Municipal Council	81600 Pengerang; 81900 Kota Tinggi; 81930 Bandar Penawar

== Election results ==
Malaysian general election, 2022
Party	Candidate	Votes	%	∆%
BN	Azalina Othman Said	21,758	51.98	▼15.73
PN	Fairulnizar Rahmat	16,728	39.96	▲39.96
PH	Che Zakaria Mohd Salleh	3,374	8.06	▲8.06
Total valid votes		41,860	100.00	
Total rejected ballots		319		
Unreturned ballots		129		
Turnout		42,288	76.40	▼6.56
Registered electors		55,316		
Majority		5,030	12.02	▼23.40
BN hold		Swing		
Source(s) https://lom.agc.gov.my/ilims/upload/portal/akta/outputp/1753254/PUB%20617%20PARLIMEN%20JOHOR.pdf

Malaysian general election, 2018
Party	Candidate	Votes	%	∆%
BN	Azalina Othman Said	21,829	67.71	▼15.93
PKR	Norliza Ngadiran	10,412	32.29	▲18.40
Total valid votes		32,240	100.00	
Total rejected ballots		557		
Unreturned ballots		782		
Turnout		33,580	82.96	▼4.06
Registered electors		40,479		
Majority		11,417	35.42	▼34.33
BN hold		Swing		
Source(s) "His Majesty's Government Gazette - Notice of Contested Election, Parliament for the State of Johore [P.U. (B) 244/2018]" (PDF). Attorney General's Chambers of Malaysia. 3 May 2018. Archived from the original (PDF) on 29 December 2019. "Federal Government Gazette - Results of Contested Election and Statements of the Poll after the Official Addition of Votes, Parliamentary Constituencies for the State of Johore [P.U. (B) 318/2018]" (PDF). Attorney General's Chambers of Malaysia. 28 May 2018.

Malaysian general election, 2013
Party	Candidate	Votes	%	∆%
BN	Azalina Othman Said	26,992	83.64	▲83.64
PKR	Tengku Intan Tengku Abdul Hamid	4,484	13.89	▲13.89
Independent	Mohd Azaman Johari	795	2.46	▲2.46
Total valid votes		32,271	100.00	
Total rejected ballots		698		
Unreturned ballots		98		
Turnout		33,067	87.02	
Registered electors		37,999		
Majority		22,508	69.75	
BN hold		Swing		
Source(s) "Federal Government Gazette - Notice of Contested Election, Parliament for the State of Johore [P.U. (B) 181/2013]" (PDF). Attorney General's Chambers of Malaysia. 26 April 2013. "Federal Government Gazette - Results of Contested Election and Statements of the Poll after the Official Addition of Votes, Parliamentary Constituencies for the State of Johore [P.U. (B) 222/2013]" (PDF). Attorney General's Chambers of Malaysia. 22 May 2013.

Malaysian general election, 2008
Party	Candidate	Votes	%	∆%
On the nomination day, Azalina Othman Said won uncontested.
BN	Azalina Othman Said			
Total valid votes			100.00	
Total rejected ballots				
Unreturned ballots				
Turnout				
Registered electors		33,002		
Majority				
BN hold		Swing		

Malaysian general election, 2004
Party	Candidate	Votes	%
On the nomination day, Azalina Othman Said won uncontested.
BN	Azalina Othman Said		
Total valid votes			100.00
Total rejected ballots			
Unreturned ballots			
Turnout			
Registered electors		30,957	
Majority			
This was a new constituency created.
