= Md Ysahrudin Kusni =

Malaysian politician

- محمد سحرالدين كوسني

Member of the Johor State Legislative Assembly for Bukit Naning
- In office 28 June 2018 – 22 January 2022
- Preceded by: Saipolbahari Suib (BN–UMNO)
- Succeeded by: Mohd Fuad Tukirin (BN–UMNO)
- Majority: 1,552 (2018)

Deputy State Chairman of the People's Justice Party of Johor
- Incumbent
- Assumed office 26 May 2024
- President: Anwar Ibrahim
- Chairman: Syed Ibrahim Syed Noh (2024–2025); Zaliha Mustafa (since 2025)
- Preceded by: Syed Ibrahim Syed Noh

Personal details
- Born: Md Ysahrudin bin Kusni; 23 September 1979 (age 47) Batu Pahat, Johor
- Citizenship: Malaysia
- Party: People's Justice Party (PKR)
- Other political affiliations: Pakatan Harapan (PH)
- Spouse: Azlinah Kasmin
- Children: Mohd Azam; Mohd Akimi; Nurul Ain; Aleesya
- Education: University of Technology Malaysia
- Occupation: Politician
- Profession: Agropreneur

Md Ysahrudin bin Kusni is a Malaysian politician who has served as the Member of Johor State Legislative Assembly for Bukit Naning from May 2018 until March 2022. He is a member and the Division Chief of Bakri of the People's Justice Party (PKR), a component party of the Pakatan Harapan (PH) coalition. Currently, he is the Deputy Chairman of Johor PKR, taking over from Syed Ibrahim Syed Noh who was appointed as Chairman.

== Politics ==
He was the Secretary of PKR Bakri branch from 2011 to 2018, Deputy Chief of PKR Bakri branch from 2018 to 2020 and was the Head of Information of PKR Johor until 2024. He is currently the Chief of PKR Bakri branch.

== Election results ==
Johor State Legislative Assembly
Year	Constituency	Candidate	Votes	Pct	Opponent(s)	Votes	Pct	Ballots cast	Majority	Turnout
2018	N14 Bukit Naning	Md Ysahrudin Kusni (PKR)	7,280	47.49%	Hassan Johari (UMNO)	5,728	37.36%	15,330	1,552	84.93%
2018	N14 Bukit Naning	Md Ysahrudin Kusni (PKR)	7,280	47.49%	Azman Ibrahim (PAS)	1,677	10.94%	15,330	1,552	84.93%
2018	N14 Bukit Naning	Md Ysahrudin Kusni (PKR)	7,280	47.49%	Jeganathan Subramaniam (IND)	364	2.37%	15,330	1,552	84.93%
2022	N14 Bukit Naning	Md Ysahrudin Kusni (PKR)	3,317	22.80%	Mohd Fuad Tukirin (UMNO)	5,437	38.14%	14,550	1,535	64.40%
2022	N14 Bukit Naning	Md Ysahrudin Kusni (PKR)	3,317	22.80%	Mahadzir Abu Said (BERSATU)	3,902	27.37%	14,550	1,535	64.40%
2022	N14 Bukit Naning	Md Ysahrudin Kusni (PKR)	3,317	22.80%	Jeganathan Subramaniam (IND)	1,514	15.99%	14,550	1,535	64.40%
2022	N14 Bukit Naning	Md Ysahrudin Kusni (PKR)	3,317	22.80%	Ibrahim Shafee (PEJUANG)	86	0.63%	14,550	1,535	64.40%
2026	N14 Bukit Naning	Md Ysahrudin Kusni (PKR)	5,564	32.05%	Mohd Sabari Ghazali (UMNO)	9,174	52.85%	17,555	3,610	76.32%
2026	N14 Bukit Naning	Md Ysahrudin Kusni (PKR)	5,564	32.05%	Mohd Radzi Amin (BERSATU)	1,896	10.92%	17,555	3,610	76.32%
2026	N14 Bukit Naning	Md Ysahrudin Kusni (PKR)	5,564	32.05%	Jeganathan Subramaniam (IND)	586	3.38%	17,555	3,610	76.32%
2026	N14 Bukit Naning	Md Ysahrudin Kusni (PKR)	5,564	32.05%	Iskandar Md Alias (BERSAMA)	138	0.80%	17,555	3,610	76.32%
