= Ledang (federal constituency) =

Federal constituency in Johor, Malaysia

Ledang (P144)
Johor constituency

Federal constituency
- Legislature: Dewan Rakyat
- MP: Syed Ibrahim Syed Noh; PH
- Constituency created: 1974
- First contested: 1974
- Last contested: 2022

Demographics
- Population (2020): 147,549
- Electors (2022): 104,577
- Area (km²): 653
- Pop. density (per km²): 226

Ledang is a federal constituency in Tangkak District, Johor, Malaysia, that has been represented in the Dewan Rakyat since 1974.

The federal constituency was created in the 1974 redistribution and is mandated to return a single member to the Dewan Rakyat under the first past the post voting system.

== Demographics ==
Ethnic breakdown of Ledang's electorate as of 2022
1. Malay (56.2%)
2. Chinese (38.6%)
3. Indian (4.80%)
4. Other ethnicities (0.40%)

As of 2020, Ledang has a population of 147,579 people.

Age breakdown of Ledang's electorate as of 2022
1. 18-20 (6.17%)
2. 21-29 (21.1%)
3. 30-39 (21.2%)
4. 40-49 (16.6%)
5. 50-59 (14.9%)
6. 60-69 (11.3%)
7. 70-79 (5.87%)
8. 80-89 (2.42%)
9. above 90 (0.40%)
Gender breakdown of Ledang's electorate as of 2022
1. Male (49.8%)
2. Female (50.6%)

== History ==
=== Polling districts ===
According to the gazette issued on 31 October 2022, the Ledang constituency has a total of 49 polling districts.

State constituency	Polling districts	Code	Location
Gambir（N09）	Kampung Babok	144/09/01	SJK (C) Kok Beng
Gambir（N09）	Sengkang	144/09/02	SK Sengkang
Gambir（N09）	Sawah Ring	144/09/03	SK Sawah Ring
Gambir（N09）	Bukit Gambir	144/09/04	SMK Bukit Gambir
Gambir（N09）	Parit Kassan	144/09/05	SK Parit Kassan
Gambir（N09）	Simpang Lima	144/09/06	SK Simpang 5 Pekan
Gambir（N09）	Parit Bilah	144/09/07	Balai Raya Kampung Sungai Bilah
Gambir（N09）	Pekan Bukit Gambir Barat	144/09/08	SK Bukit Gambir
Gambir（N09）	Pekan Bukit Gambir Timor	144/09/09	SA Bukit Gambir
Gambir（N09）	Pekan Bukit Gambir Utara	144/09/10	SJK (C) Chian Kuo
Gambir（N09）	Ladang Sagil	144/09/11	SJK (T) Ladang Sagil
Gambir（N09）	Bandar Sagil Luar	144/09/12	SJK (C) Chee Chuin
Gambir（N09）	Sagil	144/09/13	SK Sagil Kampong
Gambir（N09）	Kampong Sri Jaya	144/09/14	SK Serom 8
Gambir（N09）	Parit Zing	144/09/15	SJK (C) Khay Hian
Tangkak（N10）	Asahan Relau	144/10/01	SJK (C) Chung Hwa Asahan Muar; Balai Raya Kg. Kenangan Gemeh
Tangkak（N10）	Kampong Bahru Bekoh	144/10/02	SK Bekoh
Tangkak（N10）	Payamas	144/10/03	SMK Seri Tangkak
Tangkak（N10）	Jalan Sialang	144/10/04	SMK Ledang
Tangkak（N10）	Bandar Tangkak Utara	144/10/05	SK Sri Tangkak
Tangkak（N10）	Bandar Tangkak Timor	144/10/06	SJK (C) Chi Ming 2
Tangkak（N10）	Bandar Tangkak Selatan	144/10/07	SA Bandar Tangkak
Tangkak（N10）	Bandar Tangkak Barat	144/10/08	SJK (T) Jalan Sialang
Tangkak（N10）	Pengkalan Besar	144/10/09	SK Pengkalan Besar
Tangkak（N10）	Kampong Solok	144/10/10	Dewan Serbaguna Kg. Solok
Tangkak（N10）	Bukit Banjar	144/10/11	SK Bukit Banjar
Tangkak（N10）	Bandar Tangkak	144/10/12	SK Bandar Tangkak
Tangkak（N10）	Taman Tangkak Jaya	144/10/13	SMK Tun Mamat; SK Paya Mas
Serom (N11)	Blemang	144/11/01	SK Belemang
Serom (N11)	Paya Kepong	144/11/02	Balai Raya Paya Kepong
Serom (N11)	Telok Rimba	144/11/03	SK Telok Rimba
Serom (N11)	Pekan Bukit Kangkar	144/11/04	SJK (C) Nan Hwa
Serom (N11)	Bukit Kangkar	144/11/05	SK Bukit Kangkar
Serom (N11)	Serom Darat	144/11/06	SK Serom 3
Serom (N11)	Serom Lima	144/11/07	SK Serom 5
Serom (N11)	Serom Lapan	144/11/08	SA Serom 8
Serom (N11)	Serom Baroh	144/11/09	SA Serom 3
Serom (N11)	Bandar Serom	144/11/10	SJK (C) Chung Hwa
Serom (N11)	Sungai Mati	144/11/11	SMK Tengku Mahmud Iskandar
Serom (N11)	Kesang Tasek	144/11/12	SK Kesang Tasek
Serom (N11)	Bandar Sungai Mati	144/11/13	SK Abdullah
Serom (N11)	Rawang	144/11/14	SK Rawang
Serom (N11)	Kampong Pantai Layang	144/11/15	SK Pantai Layang
Serom (N11)	Parit Bunga	144/11/16	SK Parit Bunga
Serom (N11)	Kesang	144/11/17	SK Kesang
Serom (N11)	Parit Pajar	144/11/18	SK Tanjong Gading
Serom (N11)	Tanjong Ganding	144/11/19	SMK Parit Bunga
Serom (N11)	Tanjong Agas Utara	144/11/20	SA Tun Syed Nasir
Serom (N11)	Tanjong Agas Selatan	144/11/21	SMK Persisiran Perdana

=== Representation history ===
Members of Parliament for Ledang
Parliament	No	Years	Member	Party
Constituency created from Muar Utara and Muar Dalam
4th	P103	1974–1978	Embong Yahya (امبوڠ يحي)	BN (UMNO)
5th	P103	1978–1982	Embong Yahya (امبوڠ يحي)	BN (UMNO)
6th	P103	1982–1986	Ngah Abdul Rahman (ڠه عبدالرحمن)	BN (UMNO)
7th	P116	1986–1990	A. Ghani Othman (عبدالغاني عثمان)	BN (UMNO)
8th	P116	1990–1995	A. Ghani Othman (عبدالغاني عثمان)	BN (UMNO)
9th	P126	1995–1999	Hashim Ismail (هشيم اسماعيل)	BN (UMNO)
10th	P126	1999–2004	Hashim Ismail (هشيم اسماعيل)	BN (UMNO)
11th	P144	2004–2008	Hamim Samuri (حميم ساموري)	BN (UMNO)
12th	P144	2008–2013	Hamim Samuri (حميم ساموري)	BN (UMNO)
13th	P144	2013–2018	Hamim Samuri (حميم ساموري)	BN (UMNO)
14th	P144	2018–2022	Syed Ibrahim Syed Noh (سيد إبراهيم سيد نوه)	PH (PKR)
15th	P144	2022–present	Syed Ibrahim Syed Noh (سيد إبراهيم سيد نوه)	PH (PKR)

=== State constituency ===
Parliamentary constituency	State constituency						
Parliamentary constituency	1954–59*	1959–1974	1974–1986	1986–1995	1995–2004	2004–2018	2018–present
Ledang						Gambir	
Ledang			Serom				
Ledang			Tangkak				

=== Historical boundaries ===
State Constituency	Area				
State Constituency	1974	1984	1994	2003	2018
Gambir				Belembang; Gambir; Parit Kassan; Sagil; Sengkang	Gambir; Parit Kassan; Parit Zing; Sagil; Sengkang
Serom	Gambir; Parit Kassan; Parit Zing; Serom; Sungai Mati	Bukit Kangkar; Gambir; Kesang; Sungai Mati; Tanjung Agas		Bukit Kangkar; Kesang; Serom; Sungai Mati; Tanjung Agas	Belembang; Bukit Kangkar; Kesang; Sungai Mati; Tanjung Agas
Tangkak	Kampung Anjung Batu; Kampung Melayu Raya; Kampung Sri Makmur; Ledang; Tangkak	Kebun Baru; Ledang; Sagil; Sengkang; Tangkak	Kampung Melayu Raya; Ledang; Sagil; Sengkang; Tangkak	Kampung Anjung Batu; Kampung Solok; Kampung Sri Makmur; Ledang; Tangkak	

=== Current state assembly members ===
No.	State Constituency	Member	Coalition (Party)
N09	Gambir	Sahrihan Jani	BN (UMNO)
N10	Tangkak	Haw Chin Teck	BN (MCA)
N11	Serom	Nadhirah Afiqah Abdul Rahim	BN (UMNO)

=== Local governments & postcodes ===
No.	State Constituency	Local Government	Postcode
N09	Gambir	Tangkak District Council	84000 Muar; 84300 Bukit Pasir; 84400 Sungai Mati; 84700 Gerisik; 84800 Bukit Gambir; 84900 Tangkak
N10	Tangkak	Tangkak District Council	84000 Muar; 84300 Bukit Pasir; 84400 Sungai Mati; 84700 Gerisik; 84800 Bukit Gambir; 84900 Tangkak
N11	Serom	Tangkak District Council	84000 Muar; 84300 Bukit Pasir; 84400 Sungai Mati; 84700 Gerisik; 84800 Bukit Gambir; 84900 Tangkak

== Election results ==
Malaysian general election, 2022
Party	Candidate	Votes	%	∆%
PH	Syed Ibrahim Syed Noh	33,650	41.90	▲41.90
BN	Hamim Samuri	23,881	29.74	▼10.06
PN	Zaidi Abd Majid	22,292	27.76	▲27.76
PEJUANG	Rafidah Ridwan	269	0.33	▲0.33
Independent	Yunus Mustakim	140	0.17	▲0.17
Independent	Zainal Bahrom A. Kadir	75	0.09	▲0.09
Total valid votes		80,307	100.00	
Total rejected ballots		838		
Unreturned ballots		181		
Turnout		81,326	76.79	▼9.31
Registered electors		104,577		
Majority		9,769	12.16	▼1.10
PH hold		Swing		
Source(s) https://lom.agc.gov.my/ilims/upload/portal/akta/outputp/1753254/PUB%20617%20PARLIMEN%20JOHOR.pdf

Malaysian general election, 2018
Party	Candidate	Votes	%	∆%
PKR	Syed Ibrahim Syed Noh	34,706	53.06	▲4.72
BN	Hamim Samuri	26,040	39.80	▼11.86
PAS	Rusman Kemin	4,668	7.14	▲7.14
Total valid votes		65,414	100.00	
Total rejected ballots		1,048		
Unreturned ballots		246		
Turnout		66,708	86.10	▼1.01
Registered electors		77,474		
Majority		8,666	13.26	▲9.94
PKR gain from BN		Swing		?
Source(s) "His Majesty's Government Gazette - Notice of Contested Election, Parliament for the State of Johore [P.U. (B) 244/2018]" (PDF). Attorney General's Chambers of Malaysia. 3 May 2018. Archived from the original (PDF) on 2019-12-29. "Federal Government Gazette - Results of Contested Election and Statements of the Poll after the Official Addition of Votes, Parliamentary Constituencies for the State of Johore [P.U. (B) 318/2018]" (PDF). Attorney General's Chambers of Malaysia. 28 May 2018.

Malaysian general election, 2013
Party	Candidate	Votes	%	∆%
BN	Hamim Samuri	30,619	51.66	▼7.19
PKR	Hassan Abdul Karim	28,652	48.34	▲7.19
Total valid votes		59,271	100.00	
Total rejected ballots		1,077		
Unreturned ballots		34		
Turnout		60,382	87.11	▲10.95
Registered electors		69,316		
Majority		1,967	3.32	▼14.32
BN hold		Swing		
Source(s) "Federal Government Gazette - Notice of Contested Election, Parliament for the State of Johore [P.U. (B) 181/2013]" (PDF). Attorney General's Chambers of Malaysia. 26 April 2013. "Federal Government Gazette - Results of Contested Election and Statements of the Poll after the Official Addition of Votes, Parliamentary Constituencies for the State of Johore [P.U. (B) 222/2013]" (PDF). Attorney General's Chambers of Malaysia. 22 May 2013.

Malaysian general election, 2008
Party	Candidate	Votes	%	∆%
BN	Hamim Samuri	25,319	58.85	▼18.06
DAP	Lee Fu Haw	17,702	41.15	▲41.15
Total valid votes		43,021	100.00	
Total rejected ballots		1,433		
Unreturned ballots		102		
Turnout		44,556	76.16	▲3.25
Registered electors		58,501		
Majority		7,617	17.70	▼36.12
BN hold		Swing		

Malaysian general election, 2004
Party	Candidate	Votes	%	∆%
BN	Hamim Samuri	30,967	76.91	▲9.20
PAS	Kasim Ibrahim	9,296	23.09	▲23.09
Total valid votes		40,263	100.00	
Total rejected ballots		1,362		
Unreturned ballots		59		
Turnout		41,684	72.91	▲3.28
Registered electors		57,171		
Majority		21,671	53.82	▲18.40
BN hold		Swing		

Malaysian general election, 1999
Party	Candidate	Votes	%	∆%
BN	Hashim Ismail	25,816	67.71	▼14.26
PKR	Jamaluddin Khalid	12,309	32.29	▲32.29
Total valid votes		38,125	100.00	
Total rejected ballots		1,167		
Unreturned ballots		72		
Turnout		39,364	69.63	▼1.47
Registered electors		56,533		
Majority		13,507	35.42	▼28.52
BN hold		Swing		

Malaysian general election, 1995
Party	Candidate	Votes	%	∆%
BN	Hashim Ismail	29,948	81.97	▲21.50
S46	Ismail Nasir	6,587	18.03	▼21.50
Total valid votes		36,535	100.00	
Total rejected ballots		2,100		
Unreturned ballots		91		
Turnout		38,726	71.10	▼2.03
Registered electors		54,466		
Majority		23,361	63.94	▲43.00
BN hold		Swing		

Malaysian general election, 1990
Party	Candidate	Votes	%	∆%
BN	A. Ghani Othman	21,802	60.47	▼5.96
S46	Othman Tambi	14,255	39.53	▲39.53
Total valid votes		36,057	100.00	
Total rejected ballots		1,512		
Unreturned ballots		0		
Turnout		37,569	73.13	▲1.74
Registered electors		51,374		
Majority		7,547	20.94	▼11.92
BN hold		Swing		

Malaysian general election, 1986
Party	Candidate	Votes	%	∆%
BN	A. Ghani Othman	21,558	66.43	▲66.43
DAP	Lee Tiong King	10,893	33.57	▲33.57
Total valid votes		32,451	100.00	
Total rejected ballots		1,228		
Unreturned ballots		0		
Turnout		33,679	71.39	
Registered electors		47,174		
Majority		10,665	32.86	
BN hold		Swing		

Malaysian general election, 1982
Party	Candidate	Votes	%	∆%
On the nomination day, Ngah Abdul Rahman won uncontested.
BN	Ngah Abdul Rahman			
Total valid votes			100.00	
Total rejected ballots				
Unreturned ballots				
Turnout				
Registered electors		33,496		
Majority				
BN hold		Swing		

Malaysian general election, 1978
Party	Candidate	Votes	%	∆%
BN	Embong Yahya	16,129	73.75	▲73.75
DAP	Chong Kee Kiam	5,741	26.25	▲26.25
Total valid votes		21,870	100.00	
Total rejected ballots		811		
Unreturned ballots		0		
Turnout		22,681	78.99	
Registered electors		28,714		
Majority		10,388	47.50	
BN hold		Swing		

Malaysian general election, 1974
Party	Candidate	Votes	%
On the nomination day, Embong Yahya won uncontested.
BN	Embong Yahya		
Total valid votes			100.00
Total rejected ballots			
Unreturned ballots			
Turnout			
Registered electors		26,433	
Majority			
This was a new constituency created.
