= Syed Ibrahim Syed Noh =

Malaysian politician

Yang Berhormat Tuan Syed Ibrahim Syed Noh MP
- سيد إبراهيم سيد نوح

Deputy Minister of Natural Resources and Environmental Sustainability
- Incumbent
- Assumed office 17 December 2025
- Monarch: Ibrahim Iskandar
- Prime Minister: Anwar Ibrahim
- Minister: Arthur Joseph Kurup
- Preceded by: Huang Tiong Sii
- Constituency: Ledang

State Chairman of the People's Justice Party of Johor
- Incumbent
- Assumed office 26 May 2024
- President: Anwar Ibrahim
- Deputy: Mohd Ysahruddin Kusni
- Preceded by: Rafizi Ramli
- In office 30 September 2019 – 4 August 2022
- President: Anwar Ibrahim
- Preceded by: Hassan Abdul Karim
- Succeeded by: Rafizi Ramli

Member of the Malaysian Parliament for Ledang
- Incumbent
- Assumed office 9 May 2018
- Preceded by: Hamim Samuri (BN–UMNO)
- Majority: 8,666 (2018); 9,769 (2022)

Personal details
- Born: Syed Ibrahim bin Syed Noh; 18 June 1964 (age 62) Malacca, Malaysia
- Party: People's Justice Party (PKR)
- Other political affiliations: Pakatan Harapan (PH)
- Spouse: Melasutra Md Dali
- Children: 4
- Education: St. Louis University (MBA); University of Wisconsin (BBA)
- Occupation: Politician; activist

Syed Ibrahim bin Syed Noh is a Malaysian politician who has served as the Member of Parliament for Ledang since 2018.

He is a member of the People's Justice Party (PKR), a component party of the Pakatan Harapan (PH) coalition, and has served as the state chairman of its Johor branch since May 2024.

== Politics ==
He was the chairman of Gerakan Mansuh ISA (GMI), a movement of non-governmental organisations against the Internal Security Act. He has also been associated with IKRAM, an Islamic non-governmental organisation as an activist. He previously served as vice-president of Bersih. On December 10, 2014, he was appointed as the PKR information chief.

In 2019, Syed was appointed state chairman of the Johor branch of the People's Justice Party after the resignation of Hassan Abdul Karim. He succeeded by Rafizi Ramli in the lead-up to the 2022 Malaysian general election and reappointed in May 2024.

== Election results ==
Parliament of Malaysia
Year	Constituency	Candidate	Votes	Pct	Opponent(s)	Votes	Pct	Ballots cast	Majority	Turnout
2018	P144 Ledang	Syed Ibrahim Syed Noh (PKR)	34,706	52.03%	Hamim Samuri (UMNO)	26,040	39.04%	66,708	8,666	86.10%
2018	P144 Ledang	Syed Ibrahim Syed Noh (PKR)	34,706	52.03%	Rusman Kemin (PAS)	4,668	7.00%	66,708	8,666	86.10%
2022	P144 Ledang	Syed Ibrahim Syed Noh (PKR)	33,650	41.90%	Hamim Samuri (UMNO)	23,881	29.74%	80,307	9,769	76.79%
2022	P144 Ledang	Syed Ibrahim Syed Noh (PKR)	33,650	41.90%	Zaidi Abd Majid (BERSATU)	22,292	27.76%	80,307	9,769	76.79%
2022	P144 Ledang	Syed Ibrahim Syed Noh (PKR)	33,650	41.90%	Rafidah Ridwan (PEJUANG)	269	0.33%	80,307	9,769	76.79%
2022	P144 Ledang	Syed Ibrahim Syed Noh (PKR)	33,650	41.90%	Yunus Mustakim (IND)	140	0.17%	80,307	9,769	76.79%
2022	P144 Ledang	Syed Ibrahim Syed Noh (PKR)	33,650	41.90%	Zainal Bahrom A.Kadir (IND)	75	0.09%	80,307	9,769	76.79%

== Honours ==
=== Honours of Malaysia ===
- Malaysia
  - Recipient of the 17th Yang di-Pertuan Agong Installation Medal (2024)
