= Hamim Samuri =

Malaysian politician (born 1958)

Yang Berbahagia Datuk Hamim Samuri PJN KMN PPN
- حميم ساموري
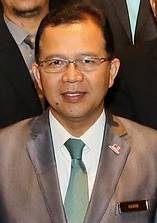

Deputy Minister of Natural Resources and Environment
- In office 29 July 2015 – 9 May 2018
- Monarchs: Abdul Halim; Muhammad V
- Prime Minister: Najib Razak
- Minister: Dr. Wan Junaidi Tuanku Jaafar
- Preceded by: Dr. James Dawos Mamit
- Succeeded by: Tengku Zulpuri Shah Raja Puji (Natural Resources); Isnaraissah Munirah Majilis (Environment)
- Constituency: Ledang

Deputy Minister of International Trade and Industry
- In office 16 May 2013 – 29 July 2015 Serving with Lee Chee Leong (2014–2015)
- Monarch: Abdul Halim
- Prime Minister: Najib Razak
- Minister: Mustapa Mohamed
- Preceded by: Mukhriz Mahathir; Jacob Dungau Sagan
- Succeeded by: Ahmad Maslan
- Constituency: Ledang

Member of the Malaysian Parliament for Ledang
- In office 21 March 2004 – 9 May 2018
- Preceded by: Hashim Ismail (BN–UMNO)
- Succeeded by: Syed Ibrahim Syed Noh (PH–PKR)
- Majority: 21,671 (2004); 7,617 (2008); 1,967 (2013)

Personal details
- Born: 13 June 1958 (age 68) Simpang Renggam, Johor, Federation of Malaya (now Malaysia)
- Party: United Malays National Organisation (UMNO)
- Other political affiliations: Barisan Nasional (BN); Perikatan Nasional (PN); Muafakat Nasional (MN)
- Education: University of Glasgow; Northern University of Malaysia
- Occupation: Politician
- Website: hamimledang.blogspot.com hamimsamuri.com

Hamim bin Haji Samuri (born 13 June 1958) is a Malaysian politician and was the Member of Parliament of Malaysia for the Ledang constituency in the State of Johor from 2004 to 2018. He is a member of the United Malay National Organisation (UMNO) party in the previously governing Barisan Nasional (BN) coalition.

== Political career ==
Hamim was elected to federal Parliament in the 2004 election. The seat had previously been held by UMNO's Hashim Ismail. He was reelected again in 2008 election and 2013 election but was defeated in 2018 election.

== Background ==
Hamim is married and he has four children. He has a degree in Civil Engineering from the University of Glasgow. In 2013, he obtained his Master in Management from Universiti Utara Malaysia and Doctor of Philosophy (PhD) in Development Management, also from Universiti Utara Malaysia in 2016.

== Election results ==
Parliament of Malaysia
Year	Constituency	Candidate	Votes	Pct	Opponent(s)	Votes	Pct	Ballots cast	Majority	Turnout
2004	P144 Ledang	Hamim Samuri (UMNO)	30,967	76.91%	Kasim Ibrahim (PAS)	9,296	23.09%	41,684	21,671	72.91%
2008	P144 Ledang	Hamim Samuri (UMNO)	25,319	58.85%	Lee Fu Haw (DAP)	17,702	41.15%	44,556	7,617	76.16%
2013	P144 Ledang	Hamim Samuri (UMNO)	30,619	51.66%	Hassan Abdul Karim (PKR)	28,652	48.34%	60,382	1,967	87.11%
2018	P144 Ledang	Hamim Samuri (UMNO)	26,040	39.80%	Syed Ibrahim Syed Noh (PKR)	34,706	53.06%	66,708	8,666	86.10%
2018	P144 Ledang	Hamim Samuri (UMNO)	26,040	39.80%	Rusman Kemin (PAS)	4,668	7.14%	66,708	8,666	86.10%
2022	P144 Ledang	Hamim Samuri (UMNO)	23,831	29.74%	Syed Ibrahim Syed Noh (PKR)	33,650	41.90%	80,307	9,769	76.79%
2022	P144 Ledang	Hamim Samuri (UMNO)	23,831	29.74%	Zaidi Abd Majid (BERSATU)	22,292	27.76%	80,307	9,769	76.79%
2022	P144 Ledang	Hamim Samuri (UMNO)	23,831	29.74%	Rafidah Ridwan (PEJUANG)	269	0.33%	80,307	9,769	76.79%
2022	P144 Ledang	Hamim Samuri (UMNO)	23,831	29.74%	Zainal Bahrom A.Kadir (IND)	75	0.09	80,307	9,769	76.79%
2022	P144 Ledang	Hamim Samuri (UMNO)	23,831	29.74%	Yunus Mustakim (IND)	145	0.17%	80,307	9,769	76.79%

== Honours ==
- Malaysia
  - Medal of the Order of the Defender of the Realm (PPN) (2000)
  - Officer of the Order of the Defender of the Realm (KMN) (2006)
  - Commander of the Order of Meritorious Service (PJN) – Datuk (2013)

== See also ==
- Ledang (federal constituency)
