= Normala Abdul Samad =

Malaysian politician

Yang Hormat Dato' Normala Abdul Samad DIMP AMN
- نورملاء عبدالصمد

Member of the Malaysian Parliament for Pasir Gudang
- In office 5 May 2013 – 9 May 2018
- Preceded by: Mohamed Khaled Nordin (BN–UMNO)
- Succeeded by: Hassan Abdul Karim (PH–PKR)
- Majority: 935 (2013)

Personal details
- Born: 16 February 1961 (age 65) Pasir Gudang, Johor, Federation of Malaya (now Malaysia)
- Citizenship: Malaysian
- Party: United Malays National Organisation (UMNO)
- Other political affiliations: Barisan Nasional (BN); Perikatan Nasional (PN); Muafakat Nasional (MN)

Normala binti Abdul Samad is a Malaysian politician. She is a member of the United Malays National Organisation (UMNO), a major component of the Barisan Nasional (BN) coalition. Normala was the former one-term Member of Parliament (2013-2018) for the Pasir Gudang constituency in the State of Johor.

== Education background ==
Normala has a Diploma in Personnel Management (MIPM), Certificate in Training & Development, Certificate in Safety & Health Management (NIOSH), Professional Diploma in Safety & Health Management (consist), Bachelor of Business Management, Paramaount University of Technology and Master of Business Administration, Nottingham University.

== Koperasi Seri Cempaka Pasir Gudang Bhd ==
Normala is the founder and current Chairman of Koperasi Seri Cempaka Pasir Gudang Bhd, which is a co-operation run by local women in Pasir Gudang. The main business run by these women are sewing, producing memorabilia, wedding apparel, cooking classes and catering.

== Political affiliation ==
Normala is an UMNO Johor member. She was chosen by Barisan Nasional to contest in Pasir Gudang in the 13th Malaysian General Election.

== Election results ==
Parliament of Malaysia
Year	Constituency	Candidate	Votes	Pct	Opponent(s)	Votes	Pct	Ballots cast	Majority	Turnout
2013	P159 Pasir Gudang	Normala Abdul Samad (UMNO)	43,834	50.54%	Ahmad Faidhi Saidi (PKR)	42,899	49.46%	88,550	935	87.64%

== Honours ==
- Malaysia
  - Member of the Order of the Defender of the Realm (AMN) (2012)
- Pahang
  - Knight Companion of the Order of the Crown of Pahang (DIMP) – Dato' (2015)

== See also ==
- Pasir Gudang (federal constituency)
