= Bukit Naning (state constituency) =

State constituency in Johor, Malaysia

Bukit Naning (N14)
Johor constituency
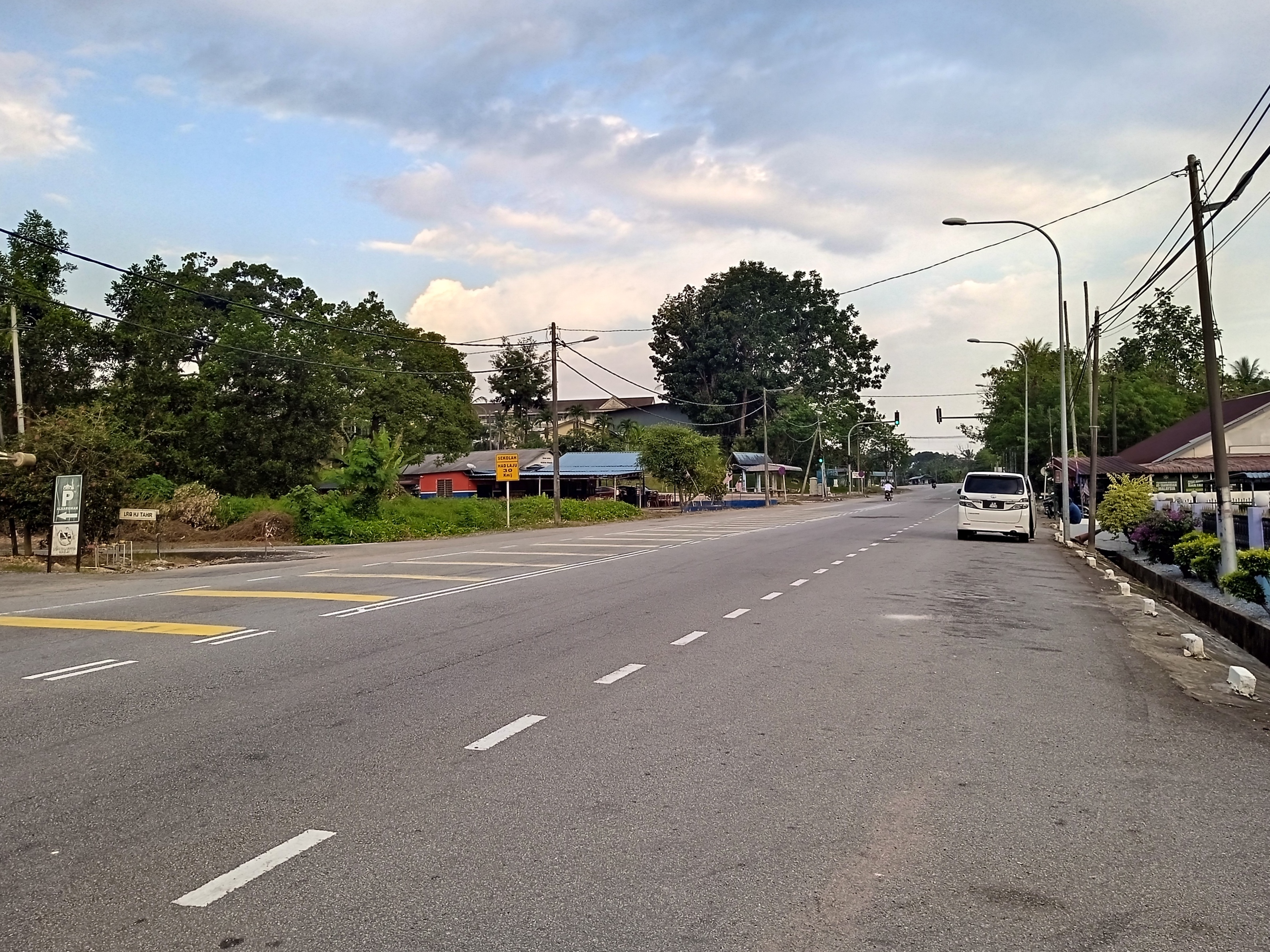

State constituency
- Legislature: Johor State Legislative Assembly
MLA
Mohd Sabari Ghazali
BN
- Constituency created: 1984
- First contested: 1986
- Last contested: 2026

Demographics
- Population (2020): 32,524
- Electors (2026): 23,002
- Area (km²): 144

Bukit Naning is a state constituency in Johor, Malaysia, that is represented in the Johor State Legislative Assembly.

The state constituency was first contested in 1986 and is mandated to return a single Assemblyman to the Johor State Legislative Assembly under the first-past-the-post voting system.

== Demographics ==
As of 2020, Bukit Naning has a population of 32,524 people.

Ethnic breakdown of Bukit Naning's electorate as of 2026
1. Malay (63.7%)
2. Chinese (34.5%)
3. Indian (0.90%)
4. Other ethnicities (0.40%)

== History ==
=== Polling districts ===
According to the federal gazette issued on 2 July 2026, the Bukit Naning constituency has a total of 10 polling districts.

State constituency	Polling Districts	Code	Location
Bukit Naning (N14)	Pekan Bukit Bakri Timor	145/14/01	SJK (C) Pu Nan
Bukit Naning (N14)	Pekan Bukit Bakri Barat	145/14/02	SMK Tun Dr. Ismail (STUDI); MRSM Muar
Bukit Naning (N14)	Bakri	145/14/03	SJK (C) Chin Terh
Bukit Naning (N14)	Parit Zain	145/14/04	SK Parit Zain
Bukit Naning (N14)	Ayer Manis	145/14/05	SJK (C) Chin Terh
Bukit Naning (N14)	Bukit Naning	145/14/06	SK Bukit Naning
Bukit Naning (N14)	Ayer Hitam	145/14/07	SK Ayer Hitam Batu 18
Bukit Naning (N14)	Kampong Parit Tengah	145/14/08	SA Ayer Hitam Batu 18
Bukit Naning (N14)	Parit No 5	145/14/09	SK Parit No. 5
Bukit Naning (N14)	Parit No 3	145/14/10	SA Parit No 5

=== Representation history ===
Members of the Legislative Assembly for Bukit Naning
Assembly	No	Years	Member	Party
Constituency created from Parit Jawa, Bandar Maharani and Sri Menanti
7th	N15	1986-1990	Hashim Rais	BN (UMNO)
8th	N15	1990-1995	Masiran Elias	BN (UMNO)
9th	N15	1995-1999	Masiran Elias	BN (UMNO)
10th	N15	1999-2004	Jamilah Othman	BN (UMNO)
11th	N14	2004-2008	Abdullah Md Ali	BN (UMNO)
12th	N14	2008-2013	Abdullah Md Ali	BN (UMNO)
13th	N14	2013–2018	Saipolbahari Suib	BN (UMNO)
14th	N14	2018–2022	Md Ysahrudin Kusni	PH (PKR)
15th	N14	2022–2026	Mohd Fuad Tukirin	BN (UMNO)
16th	N14	2026–present	Mohd Sabari Ghazali	BN (UMNO)

== Election results ==
Johor state election, 2026
Party	Candidate	Votes	%	∆%
BN	Mohd Sabari Ghazali	9,174	52.85	▲15.71
PH	Md Ysahrudin Kusni	5,564	32.05	▲32.05
PN	Mohd Radzi Amin	1,896	10.92	▼16.45
Independent	Jeganathan Subramaniam	586	3.38	▼7.24
BERSAMA	Iskandar Md Alias	138	0.8	▲0.80
Total valid votes		17,358	100.00	
Total rejected ballots		174		
Unreturned ballots		23		
Turnout		17,555	76.32	▲11.92
Registered electors		23,002		
Majority		3,610	20.80	▲10.03
BN hold		Swing		?

Johor state election, 2022
Party	Candidate	Votes	%	∆%
BN	Mohd Fuad Tukirin	5,437	38.14	▼10.24
PN	Mahadzir Abu Said	3,902	27.37	▲27.37
PKR	Md Ysahrudin Kusni	3,317	15.99	▼32.39
Independent	Jeganathan Subramaniam	1,514	10.62	▲8.20
PEJUANG	Ibrahim Shafee	86	0.63	▲0.63
Total valid votes		14,256	97.98	
Total rejected ballots		238	1.64	
Unreturned ballots		56	0.38	
Turnout		14,550	64.40	▼20.53
Registered electors		22,594		
Majority		1,535	10.77	▲0.45
BN gain from PKR		Swing		?

Johor state election, 2018
Party	Candidate	Votes	%	∆%
PKR	Md Ysahrudin Kusni	7,280	48.38	▲5.86
BN	Hassan Johari	5,728	38.06	▼15.29
PAS	Azman Ibrahim	1,677	11.14	▲11.14
Independent	Jeganathan Subramaniam	364	2.42	▲2.42
Total valid votes		15,049	98.17	
Total rejected ballots		206	1.34	
Unreturned ballots		75	0.49	
Turnout		15,330	84.93	▼4.17
Registered electors		17,834		
Majority		1,552	10.32	▼0.51
PKR gain from BN		Swing		?
Source(s) "RESULTS OF CONTESTED ELECTION AND STATEMENTS OF THE POLL AFTER THE OFFICIAL ADDITION OF VOTES".

Johor state election, 2013
Party	Candidate	Votes	%	∆%
BN	Saipolbahari Suib	7,168	53.35	▼10.39
PKR	Ab Aziz Muhammad	5,713	42.52	▲6.26
Independent	Mohd Ghazali Salamun	555	4.13	▲4.13
Total valid votes		13,436	97.30	
Total rejected ballots		319	2.31	
Unreturned ballots		54	0.39	
Turnout		13,809	89.10	▲7.45
Registered electors		15,502		
Majority		1,455	10.83	▼16.65
BN hold		Swing		
Source(s) "KEPUTUSAN PILIHAN RAYA UMUM DEWAN UNDANGAN NEGERI".

Johor state election, 2008
Party	Candidate	Votes	%	∆%
BN	Abdullah Md Ali	6,716	63.74	▼16.57
PKR	Alias Shamsir	3,821	36.26	▲16.57
Total valid votes		10,537	95.26	
Total rejected ballots		367	3.32	
Unreturned ballots		157	1.42	
Turnout		11,061	81.65	▲1.77
Registered electors		13,547		
Majority		2,895	27.48	▼33.14
BN hold		Swing		
Source(s) "KEPUTUSAN PILIHAN RAYA UMUM DEWAN UNDANGAN NEGERI PERAK BAGI TAHUN 2008".

Johor state election, 2004
Party	Candidate	Votes	%	∆%
BN	Abdullah Md Ali	8,391	80.31	▲19.62
PKR	Kusni Simoh	2,057	19.69	▲19.69
Total valid votes		10,448	95.40	
Total rejected ballots		348	3.18	
Unreturned ballots		156	1.42	
Turnout		10,952	79.88	▲2.54
Registered electors		13,710		
Majority		6,334	60.62	▲34.81
BN hold		Swing		
Source(s) "KEPUTUSAN PILIHAN RAYA UMUM DEWAN UNDANGAN NEGERI PERAK BAGI TAHUN 2004".

Johor state election, 1999
Party	Candidate	Votes	%	∆%
BN	Jamilah Othman	10,455	60.69	▲60.69
PAS	Sheikh Ibrahim Salleh	6,009	34.88	▲34.88
Total valid votes		16,464	95.57	
Total rejected ballots		678	3.94	
Unreturned ballots		86	0.50	
Turnout		17,228	77.34	
Registered electors		22,277		
Majority		4,446	25.81	
BN hold		Swing		
Source(s) "KEPUTUSAN PILIHAN RAYA UMUM DEWAN UNDANGAN NEGERI PERAK BAGI TAHUN 1999".

Johor state election, 1995
Party	Candidate	Votes	%	∆%
On the nomination day, Masiran Elias won uncontested.
BN	Masiran Elias			
Total valid votes				
Total rejected ballots				
Unreturned ballots				
Turnout				
Registered electors				
Majority				
BN hold		Swing		
Source(s) "KEPUTUSAN PILIHAN RAYA UMUM DEWAN UNDANGAN NEGERI PERAK BAGI TAHUN 1995".

Johor state election, 1990
Party	Candidate	Votes	%	∆%
BN	Masiran Elias	11,487	59.25	▼16.78
S46	Mazlan Abu	7,900	40.75	▲40.75
Total valid votes		19,387	95.80	
Total rejected ballots		849	4.20	
Unreturned ballots		0	0.00	
Turnout		20,236	77.23	▲5.11
Registered electors		26,203		
Majority		3,587	18.50	▼33.56
BN hold		Swing		
Source(s) "KEPUTUSAN PILIHAN RAYA UMUM DEWAN UNDANGAN NEGERI PERAK BAGI TAHUN 1990".

Johor state election, 1986
Party	Candidate	Votes	%
BN	Hashim Rais	11,845	76.03
PAS	Hassan Hussein	3,735	23.97
Total valid votes		15,580	93.72
Total rejected ballots		1,044	6.28
Unreturned ballots		0	0.00
Turnout		16,624	72.12
Registered electors		23,051	
Majority		8,110	52.06
This was a new constituency created.
Source(s) "KEPUTUSAN PILIHAN RAYA UMUM DEWAN UNDANGAN NEGERI PERAK BAGI TAHUN 1986".
