= Shake (singer) =

Malaysian-French singer (born 1950)

Yang Berhormat Dato' Shake
- Born: Sheikh Abdullah bin Sheikh Ahmad Bahweres; 20 May 1950 (age 76); Johor Bahru, Johor, Malaysia
- Occupation: Singer
- Years active: 1980s
- Spouse: Milena Shake
- Children: 4

Dato' Sheikh Abdullah bin Sheikh Ahmad Bahweres DPMJ (born 20 May 1950), also known as SHAKE and Dato Shake, is a Malaysian-French singer who became popular in the 1980s Malay music scene. He was born at 20 May 1950 in Johor Bahru, Johor, Malaysia, but is now based in Beverly Hills, California, and Paris, France, with his wife. He is an ex-collegian of English College Johore Bahru.

== Background ==
Shake came from a big family of four brothers and five sisters, in which he was the third youngest. As a small boy Shake dreamed of making music and distant shores. He spent his teenage years singing at his hometown's nightclub where he performed cover versions of songs by Rolling Stone, Tom Jones, Stevie Wonder, Elvis Presley and The Beatles . European artists in Malaysia encouraged him to try his luck in Europe, so he went there in the mid-1970s and Paris, France and then London, England, was his first stop, where he studied for a year with classical vocal coach John Dolby.

== Career ==
He went to Paris, France, in 1973. In 1976 he had secured a label and his first single was released, titled, "Tu sais je t'aime" (You know I love you). Shake's new single climbed the charts, followed by half a dozen other gold and platinum singles and albums in France. This made him the first notable Asian singer to sing in French; concert appearances and television specials followed and Shake became known in many French speaking countries.

He wanted to bring others to his homeland and the forefront of the music business, and started campaigns to fight against uncontrolled music piracy in South East Asia which he found disappointing.

For five consecutive years, Shake toured France and Belgium for 70 days each summer . He also performed concerts in Switzerland, Greece, Malaysia, Singapore, Indonesia and Brunei. Shake was invited to do Royal Performances for the King of Malaysia and The Sultan of Brunei, and performed at the Shrine Auditorium Los Angeles USA for Valentine's Day for an audience of 6,000 .

Recorded music sales have surpassed 60 million worldwide in all French speaking countries, including Canada, Pacific Islands, North Africa and Asia. Albums have been recorded in Malay, French, Italian and English. Performing at many prestigious festivals, including the Paris World Music Festival; Tokyo songs festival; Festival de Venice, Festival de Cortina and Verona in Italy;Festival of Artist in Belgrade, Yugoslavia, Indonesia and Malaysia Songs Festival.

In Hollywood, Shake worked on his album with producer/artist Michael Sembello, the guitarist / producer from the group Cars Elliot Easton and Dayrell Ross producer / songwriter . He is working on his own unique sound and style, which comes from his music experienced in Europe and Asia mixed with American pop rock. Shake has recorded his album with sound engineers and studios in Los Angeles and Paris for his recent English album .

== Awards ==
Shake was conferred the title of Dato DPMJ in 1979 by the late Sultan Ismail ibni Sultan Ibrahim of Johore on the latter's request, in grateful appreciation for "bringing Malaysia to the attention of the world".

He was also given the medal of Ordre des Arts et des Lettres type Chevalier from the government of France for his contributions promoting the French language and culture in Asia, where English is the more predominant European language used. Shake has performed on more than 30 television shows, variety appearances in Europe, Canada and Asia.

In 1976, he was deemed as the first Asian singer to make an international career in Europe singing in French, Italian and English.

== Personal life ==
Shake currently lives in Beverly Hills and Paris, France . He is the father of 5 children, namely Nic Shake, Amaro Shake, Mina, Natacha Shake and Celia Shake. Nic works as an actor while Amaro is a film director.
