= Syed Sis Syed Abdul Rahman =

Malaysian politician

Yang Berbahagia Dato' Syed Sis Syed Abdul Rahman DSNS
- سيد سيس سيد عبدالرحمن

Member of the Johor State Legislative Assembly for Tanjung Surat
- In office 2013–2022
- Preceded by: Harun Abdullah
- Succeeded by: Aznan Tamin

Personal details
- Born: Syed Sis bin Syed Abdul Rahman
- Citizenship: Malaysian
- Party: UMNO
- Other political affiliations: Barisan Nasional
- Education: University of Glasgow
- Occupation: Politician

Syed Sis bin Syed Abdul Rahman is a Malaysian politician. He was the Member of Johor State Legislative Assembly for Tanjung Surat from 2013 to 2018.

== Election result ==
Johor State Legislative Assembly
Year	Constituency	Candidate	Votes	Pct.	Opponent(s)	Votes	Pct.	Ballots cast	Majority	Turnout
2013	Tanjung Surat	Syed Sis Syed Abdul Rahman (UMNO)	12,014	78.09%	Hasnul Ahmad (PKR)	2,979	19.36%	15,384	9,035	84.90%
2018	Tanjung Surat	Syed Sis Syed Abdul Rahman (UMNO)	9,614	62.19%	Zamil Najwah Arbain (PKR)	5,092	32.94%	15,459	4,522	81.41%

== Honours ==
- Negeri Sembilan
  - Knight Companion of the Order of Loyalty to Negeri Sembilan (DSNS) – Dato’ (2001)
