= Hassan Abdul Karim =

Malaysian politician and lawyer

Yang Berhormat Tuan Hassan Abdul Karim MP
- حسن بن عبد الكريم

5th President of the Parti Rakyat Malaysia
- In office 17 April 2005 – 17 November 2009
- Deputy: S. K. Song
- Preceded by: Syed Husin Ali
- Succeeded by: Ariffin Salimon (Acting President)

State Chairman of the People's Justice Party of Johor
- In office 28 December 2018 – 12 July 2019
- President: Wan Azizah Wan Ismail (2014–2018); Anwar Ibrahim (2018–2019)
- Preceded by: Chua Jui Meng
- Succeeded by: Syed Ibrahim Syed Noh

Chairman of the Federal-State Relations Select Committee
- In office 4 December 2018 – 19 November 2022
- Preceded by: Position established
- Succeeded by: Position abolished

Member of the Malaysian Parliament for Pasir Gudang
- Incumbent
- Assumed office 9 May 2018
- Preceded by: Normala Abdul Samad (BN–UMNO)
- Majority: 24,726 (2018); 31,558 (2022)

Personal details
- Born: Hassan bin Abdul Karim; 17 October 1951 (age 74) Pontian, Johor, Federation of Malaya (now Malaysia)
- Citizenship: Malaysian
- Party: Parti Rakyat Malaysia (PRM) (1978–2009); People's Justice Party (PKR) (since 2009)
- Other political affiliations: Barisan Alternatif (BA) (1998–2004); Pakatan Rakyat (PR) (2009–2015); Pakatan Harapan (PH) (since 2015)
- Education: University of Malaya; University of London
- Occupation: Politician
- Profession: Lawyer
- Hassan Abdul Karim on Facebook; Hassan Abdul Karim on Parliament of Malaysia

Hassan bin Abdul Karim (born 17 October 1951; Jawi: حسن بن عبد الكريم) is a Malaysian politician and lawyer who has served as the Member of Parliament (MP) for Pasir Gudang since May 2018. He was chairman of the Federal-State Relations Select Committee from December 2018 to November 2022.

He is a member of the People's Justice Party (PKR), a component party of the Pakatan Harapan (PH) coalition, and served as the state chairman of its Johor branch from December 2018 until his resignation in July 2019. Hassan previously led Parti Rakyat Malaysia (PRM) as its president.

== Political career ==
Hassan was educated at the Universiti Malaya, where he was a student activist. He then became a lawyer by profession, and joined the left-wing Parti Sosialis Rakyat Malaysia (as PRM was then known in 1978). He went on to become its youth chief and party secretary-general. In April 2005, Hassan was elected president by a faction of dissident members who were opposed to party's merger with the National Justice Party into the People's Justice Party (PKR).

Following the rejection of Hassan's proposal that the party enter into the Pakatan Rakyat (PR) opposition coalition at a party congress, he announced his intention to resign on 15 November 2009. The same month, he re-joined PKR, then a Pakatan component party.

In the 2018 general election, Hassan was nominated by PKR to contest the Pasir Gudang parliamentary seat. Overturning his previous record of five election losses, he defeated incumbent Menteri Besar of Johor Mohamed Khaled Nordin of Barisan Nasional (BN) and three other candidates by a majority of 24,726 votes. On 4 December 2018, Hassan was appointed Chairman of the Federal-State Relations Select Committee, a parliamentary committee.

Following Anwar's release from prison and return as president of PKR, Hassan was appointed the party's Johor state chairman in 2018. However, following allegations of nepotism due to some of the appointees being allegedly linked to Anwar, Hassan initially refused the appointment. On 28 December 2018, he reversed his decision and accepted the position but later resigned 12 July 2019, citing differences with the Johor palace.

In the 2022 general election, Hassan successfully defended his seat and was re-elected by a majority of 31,558 votes.

Since the formation of the Anwar-led unity government following the 2022 general election, Hassan has emerged as one of its most vocal critics from the government backbench. In 2024, he was summoned by the PKR disciplinary board, accused of insulting royal institutions and smearing the party's image following a series of public comments. No action was ultimately taken against him.

== Legal issues ==
On 16 November 2015, Hassan was charged at the Shah Alam Sessions Court with three counts of making seditious statements via his public Twitter account in which he was alleged to have criticised the Selangor Sultan Sharafuddin Idris Shah being abroad during Selangor Mentri Besar crisis in 2014. He was discharged not amounting to an acquittal by the Sessions Court in May 2018, following the prosecution's decision to drop the charges. On 10 May 2019, he was finally granted a full acquittal on the sedition charges by the Shah Alam High Court.

== Election results ==
Parliament of Malaysia
Year	Constituency	Candidate	Votes	Pct	Opponent(s)	Votes	Pct	Ballots cast	Majority	Turnout
1986	P129 Tebrau	Hassan Abdul Karim (PSRM)	16,085	37.21%	Siti Zainabon Abu Bakar (UMNO)	27,138	62.79%	45,497	11,053	69.78%
1999	P140 Tebrau	Hassan Abdul Karim (PRM)	13,799	21.87%	Mohd. Ali Hassan (UMNO)	49,284	78.13%	65,572	35,485	75.19%
2004	P164 Pontian	Hassan Abdul Karim (PKR)	5,509	17.12%	Hasni Mohammad (UMNO)	26,667	82.88%	33,460	21,158	75.40%
2008	P160 Johor Bahru	Hassan Abdul Karim (PRM)	17,794	29.20%	Shahrir Abdul Samad (UMNO)	43,143	70.80%	62,440	25,349	69.59%
2013	P144 Ledang	Hassan Abdul Karim (PKR)	28,652	48.34%	Hamim Samuri (UMNO)	30,619	51.66%	60,382	1,967	87.11%
2018	P159 Pasir Gudang	Hassan Abdul Karim (PKR)	61,615	58.68%	Mohamed Khaled Nordin (UMNO)	36,889	35.13%	106,576	24,726	85.83%
2018	P159 Pasir Gudang	Hassan Abdul Karim (PKR)	61,615	58.68%	Ab Aziz Abdullah (PAS)	6,278	5.98%	106,576	24,726	85.83%
2018	P159 Pasir Gudang	Hassan Abdul Karim (PKR)	61,615	58.68%	Sey Jock @ Chee Jock (IND)	227	0.21%	106,576	24,726	85.83%
2022	P159 Pasir Gudang	Hassan Abdul Karim (PKR)	71,233	47.72%	Mohamad Farid Abdul Razak (BERSATU)	39,675	26.58%	149,280	31,558	75.21%
2022	P159 Pasir Gudang	Hassan Abdul Karim (PKR)	71,233	47.72%	Noor Azlen Ambros (UMNO)	37,369	25.03%	149,280	31,558	75.21%
2022	P159 Pasir Gudang	Hassan Abdul Karim (PKR)	71,233	47.72%	Mohammad Raffi Beran (IMAN)	1,003	0.67%	149,280	31,558	75.21%

== Honours ==
=== Honours of Malaysia ===
- Malaysia
  - Recipient of the 17th Yang di-Pertuan Agong Installation Medal (2024)

== See also ==
- Federal-State Relations Select Committee
- Pasir Gudang (federal constituency)
