= Tanjung Surat =

Political subdivision in Malaysia

Tanjung Surat (N39)
Johor constituency

State constituency
- Legislature: Johor State Legislative Assembly
MLA
Aznan Tamin
BN
- Constituency created: 2003
- First contested: 2004
- Last contested: 2026

Demographics
- Population (2020): 30,297
- Electors (2026): 26,943
- Area (km²): 417

Tanjung Surat is a state constituency in Johor, Malaysia, that is represented in the Johor State Legislative Assembly.

The state constituency was first contested in 2004 and is mandated to return a single Assemblyman to the Johor State Legislative Assembly under the first-past-the-post voting system.

== Demographics ==
As of 2020, Tanjung Surat has a population of 30,297 people.

Ethnic breakdown of Tanjung Surat's electorate as of 2026
1. Malay (81.3%)
2. Chinese (15.4%)
3. Other ethnicities (2.60%)
4. Indian (0.70%)

== History ==
=== Polling districts ===
According to the gazette issued on 2 July 2026, the Tanjung Surat constituency has a total of 15 polling districts.

State constituency	Polling districts	Code	Location
Tanjung Surat（N39）	Tanjong Surat	157/39/01	SK Tanjung Surat
Tanjung Surat（N39）	Tanjong Serindit	157/39/02	SA Tanjung Serindit
Tanjung Surat（N39）	Adela	157/39/03	SK (FELDA) Adela
Tanjung Surat（N39）	Bukit Tunggal	157/39/04	SK LKTP Kledang
Tanjung Surat（N39）	Sening	157/39/05	SK (FELDA) Sening
Tanjung Surat（N39）	Bukit Keledang	157/39/06	SMK Adela
Tanjung Surat（N39）	Ladang Santi	157/39/07	SK Kg. Baru Pasir Gogok
Tanjung Surat（N39）	Kampong Pasir Gogok	157/39/08	SK Kg. Baru Pasir Gogok
Tanjung Surat（N39）	Pengerang	157/39/09	SMK Tanjung Pengelih
Tanjung Surat（N39）	Kampong Jawa	157/39/10	SA Sungai Rengit
Tanjung Surat（N39）	Kampong Sungai Kapal	157/39/11	SA Sungai Rengit
Tanjung Surat（N39）	Lepau	157/39/12	SK Lepau
Tanjung Surat（N39）	Sungai Rengit	157/39/13	SJK (C) Yok Poon; SK Sungai Rengit
Tanjung Surat（N39）	Pekan Sungai Rengit	157/39/14	SJK (C) Yok Poon; SA Sungai Rengit
Tanjung Surat（N39）	Telok Ramunia	157/39/15	SK Telok Ramunia

=== Representation history ===
Members of the Legislative Assembly for Tanjung Surat
Assembly	No	Years	Member	Party
Constituency created from Pengerang
Tanjong Surat
11th	N39	2004–2008	Harun Abdullah	BN (UMNO)
12th	N39	2008–2013	Harun Abdullah	BN (UMNO)
13th	N39	2013–2018	Syed Sis Syed Abdul Rahman	BN (UMNO)
Tanjung Surat
14th	N39	2018 – 2022	Syed Sis Syed Abdul Rahman	BN (UMNO)
15th	N39	2022 – 2026	Aznan Tamin	BN (UMNO)
16th	N39	2026 – present	Aznan Tamin	BN (UMNO)

== Election results ==
Johor state election, 2026: Tanjung Surat
Party	Candidate	Votes	%	∆%
BN	Aznan Tamin	17,473	90.51	▲23.54
PH	Faizul Abdul Ghani	1,831	9.49	▲4.04
Total valid votes		19,304	100.00	
Total rejected ballots		328		
Unreturned ballots		17		
Turnout		19,649	72.93	▲13.05
Registered electors		26,943		
Majority		15,642	81.03	▲40.89
BN hold		Swing		

Johor state election, 2022: Tanjung Surat
Party	Candidate	Votes	%	∆%
BN	Aznan Tamin	9,850	66.97	▲1.60
PN	Selamat Daud	3,947	26.84	▲26.84
PKR	Rosman Tahir	800	5.44	▼29.19
PEJUANG	Samat Atan	110	0.75	▲0.75
Total valid votes		14,707	97.73	
Total rejected ballots		260	1.73	
Unreturned ballots		81	0.54	
Turnout		15,048	59.88	▼21.53
Registered electors		25,132		
Majority		5,903	40.13	▲9.39
BN hold		Swing		

Johor state election, 2018: Tanjung Surat
Party	Candidate	Votes	%	∆%
BN	Syed Sis Syed Abdul Rahman	9,614	65.37	▼14.76
PKR	Zamil Najwah Arbain	5,092	34.63	▲14.76
Total valid votes		14,706	95.13	
Total rejected ballots		303	1.96	
Unreturned ballots		405	2.62	
Turnout		15,459	81.41	▼3.49
Registered electors		18,989		
Majority		4,522	30.74	▼29.52
BN hold		Swing		
Source(s) "RESULTS OF CONTESTED ELECTION AND STATEMENTS OF THE POLL AFTER THE OFFICIAL ADDITION OF VOTES".

Johor state election, 2013: Tanjung Surat
Party	Candidate	Votes	%	∆%
BN	Syed Sis Syed Abdul Rahman	12,014	80.13	▼9.00
PKR	Hasnul Ahmad	2,979	19.87	▲9.00
Total valid votes		14,993	97.46	
Total rejected ballots		339	2.20	
Unreturned ballots		52	0.34	
Turnout		15,384	84.90	▲9.43
Registered electors		18,118		
Majority		9,035	60.26	▼18.00
BN hold		Swing		
Source(s) "KEPUTUSAN PILIHAN RAYA UMUM DEWAN UNDANGAN NEGERI".

Johor state election, 2008: Tanjung Surat
Party	Candidate	Votes	%	∆%
BN	Harun Abdullah	10,487	89.13	▼5.71
PKR	Abdul Razak Esa	1,279	10.87	▲5.71
Total valid votes		11,766	94.46	
Total rejected ballots		215	1.73	
Unreturned ballots		475	3.81	
Turnout		12,456	75.47	▲1.64
Registered electors		16,504		
Majority		9,208	78.26	▼11.42
BN hold		Swing		
Source(s) "KEPUTUSAN PILIHAN RAYA UMUM DEWAN UNDANGAN NEGERI PERAK BAGI TAHUN 2008".

Johor state election, 2004: Tanjung Surat
Party	Candidate	Votes	%
BN	Harun Abdullah	10,360	94.84
PAS	Muhram Muhamed	564	5.16
Total valid votes		10,924	96.04
Total rejected ballots		193	1.70
Unreturned ballots		258	2.27
Turnout		11,375	73.83
Registered electors		15,408	
Majority		9,796	89.68
This was a new constituency created.
Source(s) "KEPUTUSAN PILIHAN RAYA UMUM DEWAN UNDANGAN NEGERI PERAK BAGI TAHUN 2004".
