= Permas (state constituency) =

Political subdivision in Malaysia

Permas (N43)
Johor constituency

State constituency
- Legislature: Johor State Legislative Assembly
MLA
Baharudin Mohamed Taib
BN
- Constituency created: 2003
- First contested: 2004
- Last contested: 2026

Demographics
- Population (2020): 207,748
- Electors (2026): 113,963
- Area (km²): 72

Permas is a state constituency in Johor, Malaysia, that is represented in the Johor State Legislative Assembly.

The state constituency was first contested in 2004 and is mandated to return a single Assemblyman to the Johor State Legislative Assembly under the first-past-the-post voting system.

== Demographics ==
As of 2020, Permas has a population of 207,748 people.

Ethnic breakdown of Permas's electorate as of 2026
1. Malay (54.7%)
2. Chinese (26.4%)
3. Indian (11.5%)
4. Other Ethnics (7.40%)

== History ==
=== Polling districts ===
According to the gazette issued on 2 July 2026, the Permas constituency has a total of 23 polling districts.

State constituency	Polling districts	Code	Location
Permas（N43）	Bandar Masai Utara	159/43/01	SJK (T) Masai
Permas（N43）	Bandar Masai Tengah	159/43/02	SK Masai
Permas（N43）	Bandar Masai Selatan	159/43/03	SJK (C) Masai
Permas（N43）	Permas	159/43/04	SK Permas Jaya 1
Permas（N43）	Permas Jaya	159/43/05	SMK Permas Jaya
Permas（N43）	Senibong	159/43/06	SK Permas Jaya 4
Permas（N43）	Taman Kota Puteri	159/43/07	SK Seri Kota Puteri
Permas（N43）	Kampong Telok Jawa	159/43/08	SJK (C) Chee Tong
Permas（N43）	Rinting Cendana	159/43/09	SK Taman Rinting 1
Permas（N43）	Taman Mawar	159/43/10	SMK Pasir Gudang 2; SA Taman Mawar; Dewan Terbuka Kg. Pasir Gudang Baru; Tabika KEMAS Kg. Pasir Gudang Baru
Permas（N43）	Pasir Gudang	159/43/11	SK Taman Cendana; SA Taman Cendana
Permas（N43）	Pelabuhan Pasir Gudang	159/43/12	SK Pasir Gudang (2)
Permas（N43）	Taman Air Biru	159/43/13	SK Pasir Gudang 3
Permas（N43）	Rumah Pangsa PKENJ	159/43/14	SA Pasir Gudang 2; SMK Pasir Gudang
Permas（N43）	Permas 2	159/43/15	SK Taman Permas Jaya 2
Permas（N43）	Taman Megah Ria	159/43/16	SMK Taman Megah Ria
Permas（N43）	Rinting Meranti	159/43/17	SA Taman Rinting
Permas（N43）	Rinting Balau	159/43/18	SMK Taman Rinting 2
Permas（N43）	Nusa Damai	159/43/19	SK Taman Nusa Damai
Permas（N43）	Taman Bukit Dahlia	159/43/20	SK Taman Bukit Dahlia
Permas（N43）	Bandar Baru Permas Jaya	159/43/21	SK Taman Permas Jaya 3
Permas（N43）	Kampong Plentong Baru	159/43/22	Tadika Kemas Kg. Plentong Baru
Permas（N43）	Taman Scientex	159/43/23	SK Taman Scientex; SMK Taman Scientex

=== Representation history ===
Members of the Legislative Assembly for Permas
Assembly	No	Years	Member	Party
Constituency created from Pasir Gudang
11th	N43	2004–2008	Paliksina Siwalinggam (பாலிசினா சிவலிங்கம்)	BN (MIC)
12th	N43	2008–2013	Munusamy M. Mareemuthu (முனுசாமி மு. மாரிமுத்து	BN (MIC)
13th	N43	2013–2018	Mohamed Khaled Nordin	BN (UMNO)
14th	N43	2018–2020	Che Zakaria Mohd Salleh	PH (BERSATU)
14th	N43	2020–2022	Che Zakaria Mohd Salleh	PN (BERSATU)
15th	N43	2022–2026	Baharudin Mohamed Taib	BN (UMNO)
16th	N43	2026–present	Baharudin Mohamed Taib	BN (UMNO)

== Election results ==
Johor state election, 2026
Party	Candidate	Votes	%	∆%
BN	Baharudin Mohamed Taib	51,274	64.77	▲22.84
PH	Sharon Teo Siew Hui	21,769	27.50	▲1.58
BERSAMA	Zamil Najwah Arbain	3,147	3.98	▲3.98
PN	Vela Tebakumaran	2,972	3.75	▼24.03
Total valid votes		79,162	100.00	
Total rejected ballots		859		
Unreturned ballots		87		
Turnout		80,108	70.29	▲14.64
Registered electors		113,963		
Majority		29,505	37.27	▲23.12
BN hold		Swing		?

Johor state election, 2022
Party	Candidate	Votes	%	∆%
BN	Baharudin Mohamed Taib	23,492	41.93	▲4.20
PN	Tazul Arifin Nasri	15,566	27.78	▲27.78
PH	Syed Othman Abdullah	14,521	25.92	▼28.27
Heritage	Mohamed Ridza Busu	1,412	2.52	▲2.52
PEJUANG	Mahaya Ahad	1,036	1.85	▲1.85
Total valid votes		56,027	97.17	
Total rejected ballots		1,024	1.78	
Unreturned ballots		607	1.05	
Turnout		57,658	55.66	▼29.82
Registered electors		103,598		
Majority		7,926	14.15	▼2.31
BN gain from PH		Swing		?

Johor state election, 2018
Party	Candidate	Votes	%	∆%
PKR	Che Zakaria Mohd Salleh	28,793	54.19	▲54.19
BN	Mohamed Khaled Nordin	20,047	37.73	▼19.09
PAS	Abdul Aziz Abdullah	4,181	7.87	▼35.31
Independent	Rohani Yaakob	113	0.21	▲0.21
Total valid votes		53,134	98.53	
Total rejected ballots		699	1.30	
Unreturned ballots		96	0.18	
Turnout		53,929	85.48	▼1.42
Registered electors		63,093		
Majority		8,746	16.46	▲2.82
PH gain from BN		Swing		?
Source(s) "RESULTS OF CONTESTED ELECTION AND STATEMENTS OF THE POLL AFTER THE OFFICIAL ADDITION OF VOTES".

Johor state election, 2013
Party	Candidate	Votes	%	∆%
BN	Mohamed Khaled Nordin	23,952	56.82	▲2.90
PAS	Syed Othman Abdullah	18,200	43.18	▼2.90
Total valid votes		42,152	98.18	
Total rejected ballots		729	1.70	
Unreturned ballots		51	0.12	
Turnout		42,932	86.90	▼10.88
Registered electors		49,393		
Majority		5,752	13.64	▲5.80
BN hold		Swing		
Source(s) "KEPUTUSAN PILIHAN RAYA UMUM DEWAN UNDANGAN NEGERI".

Johor state election, 2008
Party	Candidate	Votes	%	∆%
BN	Munusamy M. Mareemuthu	13,878	53.92	▼22.49
PAS	Syed Othman Abdullah	11,860	46.08	▲22.49
Total valid votes		25,738	97.59	
Total rejected ballots		590	2.24	
Unreturned ballots		46	0.17	
Turnout		26,374	76.02	▲1.26
Registered electors		34,695		
Majority		2,018	7.84	▼44.98
BN hold		Swing		
Source(s) "KEPUTUSAN PILIHAN RAYA UMUM DEWAN UNDANGAN NEGERI PERAK BAGI TAHUN 2008".

Johor state election, 2004
Party	Candidate	Votes	%
BN	Paliksina Siwalinggam	15,632	76.41
PAS	Syed Othman Abdullah	4,827	23.59
Total valid votes		20,459	98.18
Total rejected ballots		374	1.79
Unreturned ballots		5	0.02
Turnout		20,838	74.76
Registered electors		27,872	
Majority		10,805	52.82
This was a new constituency created.
Source(s) "KEPUTUSAN PILIHAN RAYA UMUM DEWAN UNDANGAN NEGERI PERAK BAGI TAHUN 2004".
