= Baharudin Mohamed Taib =

Malaysian politician

Baharudin bin Mohamed Taib
- بهارالدين بن محمد طيب
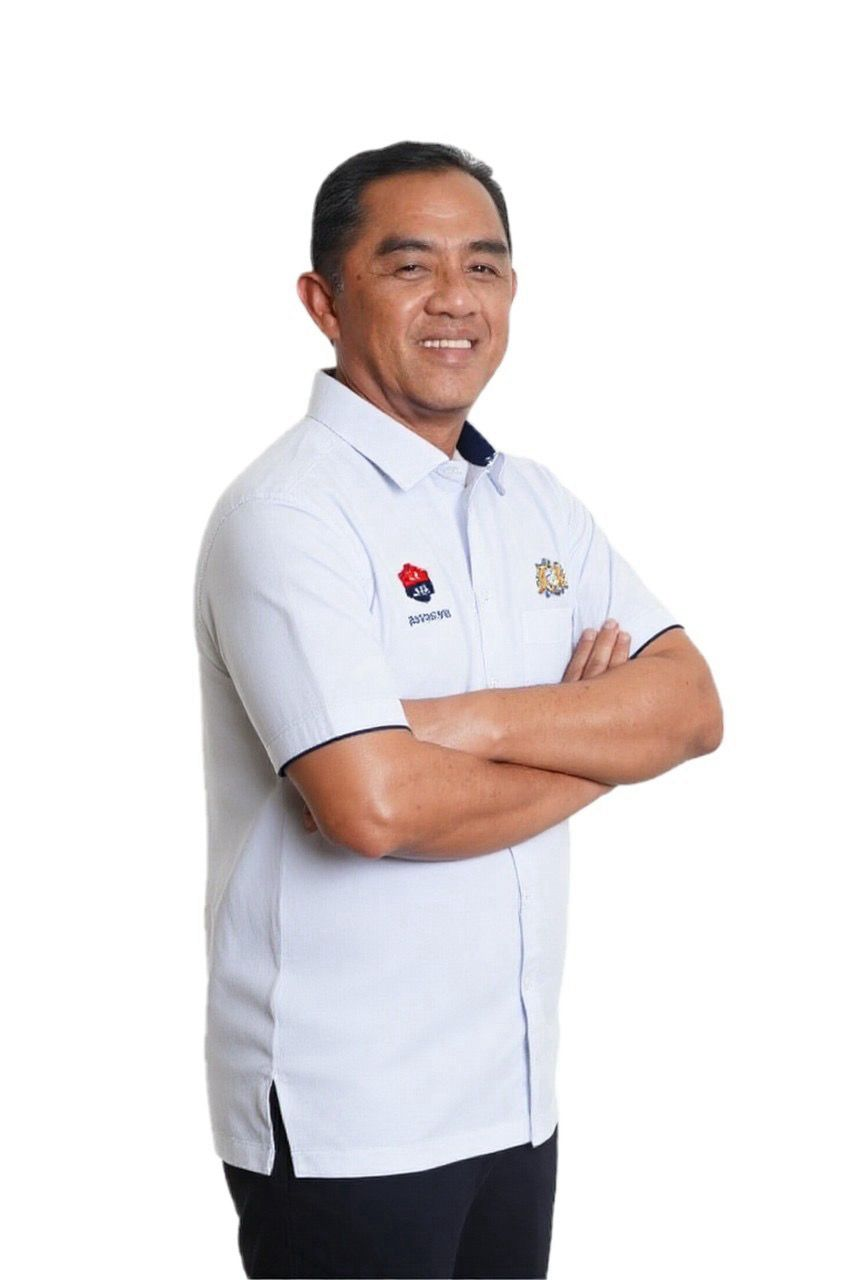
- Baharudin bin Mohamed Taib

Member of the Johor State Legislative Assembly for N.43 Permas
- Incumbent
- Assumed office 12 March 2022
- Preceded by: Che Zakaria Mohd Salleh
- Majority: 7,926 (2022)

Deputy Head of UMNO Pasir Gudang Division
- Incumbent
- Assumed office 2018

Personal details
- Born: January 27, 1965 (age 61) Johor, Malaysia
- Citizenship: Malaysian
- Party: United Malays National Organisation (UMNO)
- Other political affiliations: Barisan Nasional (BN)
- Education: UiTM
- Occupation: Politician

Baharudin bin Mohamed Taib (born 27 January 1965) is a Malaysian politician who has served as Member of the Johor State Legislative Assembly (MLA) for N.43 Permas since March 2022. He is a member of the United Malays National Organisation (UMNO), a component party of the Barisan Nasional (BN) coalition. He also serves as Deputy Head of UMNO Pasir Gudang Division.

== Political career ==
Baharudin contested the N.43 Permas seat in the 2022 Johor state election and won with a majority of 7,926 votes in a five-cornered fight against candidates from Perikatan Nasional, Pakatan Harapan, Parti Pejuang Tanah Air and Warisan.

=== Legislative activities ===
During the Johor State Legislative Assembly sitting in May 2024, Baharudin raised a question regarding the regulation of business activities by foreign nationals married to Malaysians.

In March 2026, he proposed the expansion of the Muafakat bus service to assist workers from Permas who commute daily to Singapore.

In April 2026, he emphasised that UMNO and Barisan Nasional remained focused on addressing the rising cost of living affecting Malaysians.

In May 2026, Baharudin delivered a debate speech at the Johor state assembly calling on political parties to engage respectfully with UMNO rather than dictate terms of cooperation ahead of the next general election, stating that UMNO was prepared to contest independently if no suitable partner could be found.

== Election results ==
Johor State Legislative Assembly
Year	Constituency	Candidate	Votes	Pct.	Opponent(s)	Votes	Pct.	Ballots cast	Majority	Turnout
2022	N43 Permas	Baharudin Mohamed Taib (UMNO)	23,492	41.93%	Tazul Arifin Nasri (BERSATU)	15,566	27.78%	57,658	7,926	55.7%
2022	N43 Permas	Baharudin Mohamed Taib (UMNO)	23,492	41.93%	Syed Othman (AMANAH)	14,521	25.92%	57,658	7,926	55.7%
2022	N43 Permas	Baharudin Mohamed Taib (UMNO)	23,492	41.93%	Mohamed Ridza Busu (WARISAN)	1,421	2.52%	57,658	7,926	55.7%
2022	N43 Permas	Baharudin Mohamed Taib (UMNO)	23,492	41.93%	Mahaya Ahad (PEJUANG)	1,036	1.85%	57,658	7,926	55.7%
