= List of Malaysian State Assembly Representatives (2018–2023) =

Legislature representatives

List of Malaysian State Assembly Representatives (2013–2018)
List of Malaysian State Assembly Representatives (2018–2023)
List of Malaysian State Assembly Representatives (2023–present)

The following are the members of the Dewan Undangan Negeri or state assemblies, elected in the 2018 state elections which was part of the 2018 Malaysian general elections. Also included are the list of the Sarawak state assembly members who were elected in 2016. (Note: Period:9 May 2018 - 30 June 2023) On 24 February 2020, the Malaysian United Indigenous Party (BERSATU) and a faction of the Members of Parliament (MPs) from the People's Justice Party (PKR) led by the PKR's then-Deputy President Mohamed Azmin Ali left the governing coalition Pakatan Harapan, resulting in the collapse of the Pakatan Harapan coalition administration led by the then-Prime Minister Mahathir Mohamad. (Note: 9 May 2018 - 30 June 2023)

== Composition ==
=== Results of the 14th Malaysian general election (State) ===
Results of the 14th Malaysian general election (State) 10 May 2018
State legislative assemblies	# of seats	Simple majority	PKR seats	BN seats	PAS seats	WARISAN seats	DAP seats	STAR seats	IND seats
Perlis	15	8	3	10	2	0	0	0	0
Kedah	36	19	18	3	15	0	0	0	0
Kelantan	45	23	0	8	37	0	0	0	0
Terengganu	32	17	0	10	22	0	0	0	0
Penang	40	21	37	2	1	0	0	0	0
Perak	59	30	29	27	3	0	0	0	0
Pahang	42	22	9	25	8	0	0	0	0
Selangor	56	29	51	4	1	0	0	0	0
Negeri Sembilan	36	19	20	16	0	0	0	0	0
Malacca	28	15	15	13	0	0	0	0	0
Johor	56	29	36	19	1	0	0	0	0
Sabah	60	31	2	29	0	21	6	2	0
Total	505		220	166	90	21	6	2	0

=== Current composition ===
Composition as of 12 October 2022
State legislative assemblies	# of seats	Simple majority	PN + BN + GPS + GRS + PBM + KDM seats	PH + MUDA seats	WARISAN seats	PEJUANG seats	PSB seats	IND seats	VAC seats
Perlis	15	8	12	1	0	0	0	0	0
Kedah	36	19	21 (PN) + 2 (BN)	11	0	2	0	0	0
Kelantan	45	23	37 (PN) + 7 (BN)	0	0	0	0	0	1
Terengganu	32 + 4 (nominated)	17	23 (PN) + 10 (BN)	0	0	0	0	0	3
Penang	40	21	7	33	0	0	0	0	0
Perak	59	30	35	23	0	0	0	1	0
Pahang	42 + 5 (nominated)	22	33	9	0	0	0	0	5
Selangor	56	29	12	40	1	3	0	0	0
Negeri Sembilan	36	19	16	20	0	0	0	0	0
Malacca	28	15	21 (BN) + 2 (PN)	5	0	0	0	0	0
Johor	56	29	40 (BN) + 3 (PN)	13	0	0	0	0	
Sabah	73 + 6 (nominated)	37	52	9	17	0	0	0	1
Sarawak	82	42	76	2	0	0	4	0	0
Total	610		409	182	18	5	4	1	10

== Perlis ==
=== 2018–2022 ===
14th Perlis State Legislative Assembly
←	13th Assembly	15th Assembly	→

Overview
- Legislative body: Perlis State Legislative Assembly
- Jurisdiction: Perlis
- Meeting place: Perlis State Assembly Complex, Kangar
- Term: 20 July 2018 – 14 October 2022
- Election: 2018 state election
- Government: Perlis State Executive Council
- Website: www.perlis.gov.my
- Members: 15
- Speaker: Hamdan Bahari
- Deputy Speaker: Mohd Shukri Ramli
- Secretary: Syed Omar Sharifuddin
- Menteri Besar: Azlan Man
- Opposition Leader: Asrul Nizan Abd Jalil
- Party control: Barisan Nasional

Sovereign
- Raja: Tuanku Syed Sirajuddin

Sessions
- 1st: 20 July 2018 – 14 October 2022

No.	State Constituency	Member	Coalition (party)
BN 10 | PH 3 | PN 2
#	Non-MLA	Hamdan Bahari	BN (UMNO)
N01	Titi Tinggi	Teh Chai Aan	BN (MCA)
N02	Beseri	Ruzaini Rais	BN (UMNO)
N03	Chuping	Asmaiza Ahmad	BN (UMNO)
N04	Mata Ayer	Siti Berenee Yahaya	BN (UMNO)
N05	Santan	Azizan Sulaiman	BN (UMNO)
N06	Bintong	Azlan Man	BN (UMNO)
N07	Sena	Asrul Nizan Abd Jalil	PH (PKR)
N08	Indera Kayangan	Gan Ay Ling	PH (PKR)
N09	Kuala Perlis	Nor Azam Karap	PH (PKR)
N10	Kayang	Hamizan Hassan	BN (UMNO)
N11	Pauh	Rozieana Ahmad	BN (UMNO)
N12	Tambun Tulang	Ismail Kassim (Note: Ismail Kassim contested the general election as a Barisan Nasional (UMNO) candidate, quit UMNO on 20 June 2018 and became an independent. He rejoined UMNO in May 2020.)	BN (UMNO)
N13	Guar Sanji	Mohd Ridzuan Hashim	PN (PAS)
N14	Simpang Empat	Nurulhisham Yaakob	BN (UMNO)
N15	Sanglang	Mohd Shukri Ramli	PN (PAS)

=== 2022–2023 ===
15th Perlis State Legislative Assembly
←	14th Assembly	16th Assembly	→

Overview
- Legislative body: Perlis State Legislative Assembly
- Jurisdiction: Perlis
- Meeting place: Perlis State Assembly Complex, Kangar
- Term: 19 December 2022 – TBD
- Election: 2022 state election
- Government: Perlis State Executive Council
- Website: www.perlis.gov.my
- Members: 15
- Speaker: Ruse'ele Eizan
- Deputy Speaker: Mohd Shukri Ramli
- Secretary: Syed Omar Sharifuddin
- Menteri Besar: Mohd Shukri Ramli
- Opposition Leader: Gan Ay Ling
- Party control: Perikatan Nasional

Sovereign
- Raja: Tuanku Syed Sirajuddin

Sessions
- 1st: 19 December 2022 – TBD

No.	State Constituency	Member	Coalition (party)
PN 14 | PH 1
#	Non-MLA	Rus'sele Eizan	PN (PAS)
N1	Titi Tinggi	Izizam Ibrahim	PN (BERSATU)
N2	Beseri	Haziq Asyraf Dun	PN (PAS)
N3	Chuping	Saad Seman	PN (PAS)
N4	Mata Ayer	Wan Badariah Wan Saad	PN (PAS)
N5	Santan	Mohammad Azmir Azizan	PN (PAS)
N6	Bintong	Fakhrul Anwar Ismail	PN (PAS)
N7	Sena	Marzita Mansor	PN (BERSATU)
N8	Indera Kayangan	Gan Ay Ling	PH (PKR)
N9	Kuala Perlis	Abu Bakar Hamzah	PN (BERSATU)
N10	Kayang	Asrul Aimran Abd Jalil	PN (PAS)
N11	Pauh	Megat Hashirat Hassan	PN (BERSATU)
N12	Tambun Tulang	Wan Zikri Afthar Ishak	PN (BERSATU)
N13	Guar Sanji	Mohd Ridzuan Hashim	PN (PAS)
N14	Simpang Empat	Razali Saad	PN (PAS)
N15	Sanglang	Mohd Shukri Ramli	PN (PAS)

== Kedah ==
=== 2018–2023 ===
14th Kedah State Legislative Assembly
←	13th Assembly	15th Assembly	→

Overview
- Legislative body: Kedah State Legislative Assembly
- Jurisdiction: Kedah
- Meeting place: Wisma Darul Aman, Alor Setar
- Term: 4 July 2018 – 28 June 2023
- Election: 2018 state election
- Government: Kedah State Executive Council
- Website: mmk.kedah.gov.my
- Members: 36
- Speaker: Juhari Bulat
- Deputy Speaker: Ahmad Fadzli Hashim
- Secretary: Iqbal Ahmad
- Menteri Besar: Muhammad Sanusi Md Nor
- Opposition Leader: Phahrolrazi Zawawi; Johari Abdul; Zamri Yusuf
- Party control: Perikatan Nasional

Sovereign
- Sultan: Sultan Sallehuddin

Sessions
- 1st: 4 July 2018 – 28 June 2023

No.	State Constituency	Member	Coalition (party)
PN 20 | PH 10 | BN 2 | GTA 2 | VAC 2
N01	Ayer Hangat	Juhari Bulat	PN (BERSATU)
N02	Kuah	Mohd Firdaus Ahmad	PN (BERSATU)
N03	Kota Siputeh	Salmee Said	PH (AMANAH)
N04	Ayer Hitam	Azhar Ibrahim	PN (PAS)
N05	Bukit Kayu Hitam	Halimaton Shaadiah Saad	PN (BERSATU)
N06	Jitra	Mukhriz Mahathir (Note: Mukhriz Mahathir contested the general election as a candidate of Pakatan Harapan (BERSATU), was sacked from the party on 28 May 2020 and thus became an independent. He and ex-BERSATU members later formed new party PEJUANG in August, 2020.)	GTA (PEJUANG)
N07	Kuala Nerang	Mohamad Yusoff Zakaria	PN (PAS)
N08	Pedu	Mohd Radzi Md Amin	PN (PAS)
N09	Bukit Lada	Salim Mahmood	PN (PAS)
N10	Bukit Pinang	Wan Romani Wan Salim	PN (PAS)
N11	Derga	Tan Kok Yew	PH (DAP)
N12	Suka Menanti	Zamri Yusuf	PH (PKR)
N13	Kota Darul Aman	Teh Swee Leong	PH (DAP)
N14	Alor Mengkudu	Phahrolrazi Mohd Zawawi (Note: Phahrolrazi contested the general election as a Pakatan Harapan (AMANAH) candidate, was sacked from AMANAH on 30 October 2022 and become independent. He was also the Opposition Leader from 20 July 2020 to his sacking date. Phahrolrazi later joined another PH component party, PKR.)	PH (PKR)
N15	Anak Bukit	Amiruddin Hamzah (Note: Amiruddin Hamzah contested the general election as a candidate of Pakatan Harapan (BERSATU), was sacked from the party on 28 May 2020 and thus became an independent. He and ex-BERSATU members later formed new party PEJUANG in August, 2020.)	GTA (PEJUANG)
N16	Kubang Rotan	Mohd Asmirul Anuar Aris	PH (AMANAH)
N17	Pengkalan Kundor	Ismail Salleh	PH (AMANAH)
N18	Tokai	Mohd Hayati Othman	PN (PAS)
N19	Sungai Tiang	Suraya Yaacob	BN (UMNO)
N20	Sungai Limau	Mohd Azam Abd Samat	PN (PAS)
N21	Guar Chempedak	Ku Abd Rahman Ku Ismail (Note: Ku Abd Rahman Ku Ismail contested the general election as a Barisan Nasional (UMNO) candidate, resigned from UMNO on 12 November 2018. He later joined BERSATU on 12 December 2019.)	PN (BERSATU)
N22	Gurun	Vacant (Note: Johari Abdul contested and won the seat in the general election as a Pakatan Harapan (PKR) candidate, and announced he resigned his state seat on 18 December 2022. He was also the Opposition Leader from 31 October 2022 to his resignation date.)	VAC
N22	Gurun	Johari Abdul until 18 December 2022	PH (PKR)
N23	Belantek	Vacant (Note: Mohd Isa Shafie died in office on 14 June 2023.)	VAC
N23	Belantek	Mohd Isa Shafie until 14 June 2023	PN (PAS)
N24	Jeneri	Muhammad Sanusi Md Nor	PN (PAS)
N25	Bukit Selambau	Summugam Rengasamy	PH (PKR)
N26	Tanjong Dawai	Hanif Ghazali	PN (PAS)
N27	Pantai Merdeka	Ahmad Fadzli Hashim	PN (PAS)
N28	Bakar Arang	Ooi Tze Min	PH (PKR)
N29	Sidam	Robert Ling Kui Ee (Note: Ling Kui Ee contested the general election as a Pakatan Harapan (PKR) candidate, resigned from the party and became an independent on 12 May 2020. He later joined BERSATU on 6 September 2020.)	PN (BERSATU)
N30	Bayu	Abd Nasir Idris	PN (PAS)
N31	Kupang	Najmi Ahmad	PN (PAS)
N32	Kuala Ketil	Mansor Zakaria	PN (PAS)
N33	Merbau Pulas	Siti Aishah Ghazali	PN (PAS)
N34	Lunas	Azman Nasruddin (Note: Azman Nasruddin contested the general election as a Pakatan Harapan (PKR) candidate, resigned from the party and became an independent on 12 May 2020. He later joined BERSATU on 6 September 2020.)	PN (BERSATU)
N35	Kulim	Yeo Keng Chuan	PH (PKR)
N36	Bandar Baharu	Norsabrina Mohd. Noor	BN (UMNO)

== Kelantan ==
=== 2018–2023 ===
14th Kelantan State Legislative Assembly
←	13th Assembly	15th Assembly	→

Overview
- Legislative body: Kelantan State Legislative Assembly
- Jurisdiction: Kelantan
- Meeting place: Kota Darul Naim, Kota Bharu
- Term: 28 June 2018 – 22 June 2023
- Election: 2018 state election
- Government: Kelantan State Executive Council
- Website: www.kelantan.gov.my
- Members: 45
- Speaker: Abdullah Ya'kub
- Deputy Speaker: Abd Fattah Mahmood
- Secretary: Mohd Zaika Yamani Ibrahim
- Menteri Besar: Ahmad Yakob
- Party control: Perikatan Nasional

Sovereign
- Sultan: Sultan Muhammad V

Sessions
- 1st: 28 June 2018 – 22 June 2023

No.	State Constituency	Member	Coalition (party)
PN 37 | BN 7 | VAC 1
#	Non-MLA	Abdullah Ya'kub	PN (PAS)
N1	Pengkalan Kubor	Wan Roslan Wan Hamat	PN (PAS)
N2	Kelaboran	Mohd Adenan Hassan	PN (PAS)
N3	Pasir Pekan	Ahmad Yaakob	PN (PAS)
N4	Wakaf Bharu	Mohd Rusli Abdullah	PN (PAS)
N5	Kijang	Izani Husin	PN (PAS)
N6	Chempaka	Ahmad Fathan Mahmood	PN (PAS)
N7	Panchor	Nik Mohd. Amar Nik Abdullah	PN (PAS)
N8	Tanjong Mas	Rohani Ibrahim	PN (PAS)
N9	Kota Lama	Tan Teng Loon @ Anuar Tan Abdullah	PN (PAS)
N10	Bunut Payong	Ramli Mamat	PN (PAS)
N11	Tendong	Rozi Muhamad	PN (PAS)
N12	Pengkalan Pasir	Hanifa Ahmad	PN (PAS)
N13	Meranti	Mohd. Nassuruddin Daud	PN (PAS)
N14	Chetok	Zuraidin Abdullah	PN (PAS)
N15	Gual Periok	Mohamad Awang	PN (PAS)
N16	Apam Putra	Abdul Rasul Mohamed	PN (PAS)
N17	Salor	Saiful Adli Abu Bakar	PN (PAS)
N18	Pasir Tumboh	Abd Rahman Yunus	PN (PAS)
N19	Demit	Mumtaz Md. Nawi	PN (PAS)
N20	Tawang	Hassan Mohamood	PN (PAS)
N21	Pantai Irama	Mohd Huzaimy Che Husin	PN (PAS)
N22	Jelawat	Abdul Azziz Kadir	PN (PAS)
N23	Melor	Vacant	VAC
N23	Melor	Md Yusnan Yusof until 30 April 2021	PN (PAS)
N24	Kadok	Azami Md. Nor	PN (PAS)
N25	Kok Lanas	Md Alwi Che Ahmad	BN (UMNO)
N26	Bukit Panau	Abdul Fattah Mahmood	PN (PAS)
N27	Gual Ipoh	Bakri Mustapha	BN (UMNO)
N28	Kemahang	Md. Anizam Ab. Rahman	PN (PAS)
N29	Selising	Tuan Mohd Saripuddin Tuan Ismail	PN (PAS)
N30	Limbongan	Mohd Nazlan Mohamed Hasbullah	PN (PAS)
N31	Semerak	Wan Hassan Wan Ibrahim	PN (PAS)
N32	Gaal	Mohd Rodzi Ja'afar	PN (PAS)
N33	Pulai Chondong	Azhar Salleh	PN (PAS)
N34	Temangan	Mohamed Fadzli Hassan	PN (PAS)
N35	Kemuning	Mohd Roseli Ismail	PN (PAS)
N36	Bukit Bunga	Mohd Adhan Kechik	BN (UMNO)
N37	Ayer Lanas	Mustapa Mohamed	PN (BERSATU)
N38	Kuala Balah	Abd Aziz Derashid	BN (UMNO)
N39	Mengkebang	Muhammad Mat Sulaiman	PN (PAS)
N40	Guchil	Hilmi Abdullah	PN (PAS)
N41	Manek Urai	Mohd Fauzi Abdullah	PN (PAS)
N42	Dabong	Ku Mohd Zaki Ku Hussien	PN (PAS)
N43	Nenggiri	Ab Aziz Yusoff	BN (UMNO)
N44	Paloh	Amran Arifin	BN (UMNO)
N45	Galas	Mohd Syahbuddin Hashim	BN (UMNO)

== Terengganu ==
=== 2018–2023 ===
14th Terengganu State Legislative Assembly
←	13th Assembly	15th Assembly	→

Overview
- Legislative body: Terengganu State Legislative Assembly
- Jurisdiction: Terengganu
- Meeting place: Wisma Darul Iman, Kuala Terengganu
- Term: 1 July 2018 – 28 June 2023
- Election: 2018 state election
- Government: Terengganu State Executive Council
- Website: www.terengganu.gov.my
- Members: 32 elected members 1 nominated member
- Speaker: Yahaya Ali
- Secretary: Zulkifli Isa
- Menteri Besar: Ahmad Samsuri Mokhtar
- Opposition Leader: Ahmad Said
- Party control: Perikatan Nasional

Sovereign
- Sultan: Sultan Mizan Zainal Abidin

Sessions
- 1st: 1 July 2018 – 28 June 2023

No.	State Constituency	Member	Coalition (party)
PN 24 | BN 10
#	Non-MLA	Yahaya Ali	PN (PAS)
N1	Kuala Besut	Tengku Zaihan Che Ku Abd Rahman	BN (UMNO)
N2	Kota Putera	Mohd Nurkhuzaini Ab Rahman	PN (PAS)
N3	Jertih	Muhammad Pehimi Yusof	BN (UMNO)
N4	Hulu Besut	Nawi Mohamad	BN (UMNO)
N5	Jabi	Azman Ibrahim	PN (PAS)
N6	Permaisuri	Abd Halim Jusoh	BN (UMNO)
N7	Langkap	Sabri Mohd Noor	BN (UMNO)
N8	Batu Rakit	Bazlan Abd Rahman	BN (UMNO)
N9	Tepuh	Hishamuddin Abdul Karim	PN (PAS)
N10	Buluh Gading	Ridzuan Hashim	PN (PAS)
N11	Seberang Takir	Ahmad Razif Abdul Rahman	BN (UMNO)
N12	Bukit Tunggal	Alias Razak	PN (PAS)
N13	Wakaf Mempelam	Wan Sukairi Wan Abdullah	PN (PAS)
N14	Bandar	Ahmad Shah Muhamed	PN (PAS)
N15	Ladang	Tengku Hassan Tengku Omar	PN (PAS)
N16	Batu Buruk	Muhammad Khalil Abdul Hadi	PN (PAS)
N17	Alur Limbat	Ariffin Deraman	PN (PAS)
N18	Bukit Payung	Mohd Nor Hamzah	PN (PAS)
N19	Ru Rendang	Ahmad Samsuri Mokhtar	PN (PAS)
N20	Pengkalan Berangan	Sulaiman Sulong	PN (PAS)
N21	Telemung	Rozi Mamat	BN (UMNO)
N22	Manir	Hilmi Harun	PN (PAS)
N23	Kuala Berang	Mamad Puteh	PN (PAS)
N24	Ajil	Maliaman Kassim	PN (PAS)
N25	Bukit Besi	Roslee Daud	BN (UMNO)
N26	Rantau Abang	Alias Harun	PN (PAS)
N27	Sura	Wan Hapandi Wan Nik	PN (PAS)
N28	Paka	Satiful Bahri Mamat	PN (PAS)
N29	Kemasik	Saiful Azmi Suhaili	PN (PAS)
N30	Kijal	Ahmad Said	BN (UMNO)
N31	Cukai	Hanafiah Mat	PN (PAS)
N32	Air Putih	Ab Razak Ibrahim	PN (PAS)
—	Nominated member	Zuraida Md Noor	PN (PAS)

== Penang ==
=== 2018–2023 ===
14th Penang State Legislative Assembly
←	13th Assembly	15th Assembly	→

Overview
- Legislative body: Penang State Legislative Assembly
- Jurisdiction: Penang
- Meeting place: Penang State Assembly Building, George Town
- Term: 2 August 2018 – 28 June 2023
- Election: 2018 state election
- Government: Penang State Executive Council
- Website: dun.penang.gov.my
- Members: 40
- Speaker: Law Choo Kiang
- Deputy Speaker: Amar Pritpal Abdullah
- Secretary: Mohd Farulizam Che Meh
- Government Leader: Chow Kon Yeow
- Opposition Leader: Muhamad Yusoff Mohd Noor
- Party control: Pakatan Harapan

Sovereign
- Yang di-Pertua Negeri: Ahmad Fuzi Abdul Razak

Sessions
- 1st: 2 August 2018 – 28 June 2023

No.	State Constituency	Member	Coalition (party)
PH 33 | PN 1 | BN 2 | VAC 4
N01	Penaga	Mohd. Yusni Mat Piah	PN (PAS)
N02	Bertam	Vacant since 6 March 2023)	VAC
N02	Bertam	Khaliq Mehtab Mohd. Ishaq until 6 March 2023	PN (BERSATU)
N03	Pinang Tunggal	Ahmad Zakiyuddin Abd. Rahman	PH (PKR)
N04	Permatang Berangan	Nor Hafizah Othman	BN (UMNO)
N05	Sungai Dua	Muhamad Yusoff Mohd Noor	BN (UMNO)
N06	Telok Ayer Tawar	Mustafa Kamal Ahmad	PH (PKR)
N07	Sungai Puyu	Phee Boon Poh	PH (DAP)
N08	Bagan Jermal	Soon Lip Chee	PH (DAP)
N09	Bagan Dalam	Satees Muniandy	PH (DAP)
N10	Seberang Jaya	Vacant since 6 March 2023	VAC
N10	Seberang Jaya	Afif Bahardin until 6 March 2023 (Note: Afif Bahardin contested the general election as a Pakatan Harapan (PKR) candidate and had his membership by party on 4 May 2020. He later joined BERSATU on 24 June 2020.)	PN (BERSATU)
N11	Permatang Pasir	Muhammad Faiz Fadzil	PH (AMANAH)
N12	Penanti	Norlela Ariffin	PH (PKR)
N13	Berapit	Heng Lee Lee	PH (DAP)
N14	Machang Bubok	Lee Khai Loon	PH (PKR)
N15	Padang Lalang	Chong Eng	PH (DAP)
N16	Perai	Ramasamy Palanisamy	PH (DAP)
N17	Bukit Tengah	Gooi Hsiao-Leung	PH (PKR)
N18	Bukit Tambun	Goh Choon Aik	PH (PKR)
N19	Jawi	Jason H'ng Mooi Lye	PH (DAP)
N20	Sungai Bakap	Amar Pritpal Abdullah	PH (PKR)
N21	Sungai Acheh	Vacant since 6 March 2023	VAC
N21	Sungai Acheh	Zulkifli Ibrahim until 6 March 2023 (Note: Zulkifli Ibrahim contested the general election as a Pakatan Harapan (PKR) candidate, had his membership terminated on 28 June 2020 and became an independent.)	PN (BERSATU)
N22	Tanjong Bunga	Zairil Khir Johari	PH (DAP)
N23	Air Putih	Lim Guan Eng	PH (DAP)
N24	Kebun Bunga	Ong Khan Lee	PH (PKR)
N25	Pulau Tikus	Lee Chun Kit	PH (DAP)
N26	Padang Kota	Chow Kon Yeow	PH (DAP)
N27	Pengkalan Kota	Gooi Zi Sen	PH (DAP)
N28	Komtar	Teh Lai Heng	PH (DAP)
N29	Datok Keramat	Jagdeep Singh Deo	PH (DAP)
N30	Sungai Pinang	Lim Siew Khim	PH (DAP)
N31	Batu Lancang	Ong Ah Teong	PH (DAP)
N32	Seri Delima	Syerleena Abdul Rashid	PH (DAP)
N33	Air Itam	Joseph Ng Soon Siang	PH (DAP)
N34	Paya Terubong	Yeoh Soon Hin	PH (DAP)
N35	Batu Uban	Kumaresan Aramugam	PH (PKR)
N36	Pantai Jerejak	Saifuddin Nasution Ismail	PH (PKR)
N37	Batu Maung	Abdul Halim Hussain	PH (PKR)
N38	Bayan Lepas	Azrul Mahathir Aziz	PH (AMANAH)
N39	Pulau Betong	Mohd Tuah Ismail	PH (PKR)
N40	Telok Bahang	Vacant since 6 March 2023	VAC
N40	Telok Bahang	Zolkifly Mohd Lazim until 6 March 2023	PN (BERSATU)

== Perak ==
=== 2018–2022 ===
14th Perak State Legislative Assembly
←	13th Assembly	15th Assembly	→

Overview
- Legislative body: Perak State Legislative Assembly
- Jurisdiction: Perak
- Meeting place: Bangunan Perak Darul Ridzuan, Ipoh
- Term: 3 July 2018 – 17 October 2022
- Election: 2018 state election
- Government: Perak State Executive Council
- Website: www.perak.gov.my
- Members: 59
- Speaker: Mohamad Zahir Abdul Khalid
- Deputy Speaker: Khalil Yahya
- Secretary: Shahrul Azam Shaari
- Government Leader: Saarani Mohammad
- Opposition Leader: Abdul Aziz Bari
- Party control: Barisan Nasional

Sovereign
- Sultan: Sultan Nazrin Muizzuddin Shah

Sessions
- 1st: 3 July 2018 – 17 October 2022

No.	State Constituency	Member	Coalition (party)
BN 25 | PH 23 | PN 8 | PBM 2 | IND 1
-	Non-MLA	Mohamad Zahir Abdul Khalid	BN (UMNO)
N1	Pengkalan Hulu	Aznel Ibrahim	BN (UMNO)
N2	Temengor	Salbiah Mohamed	BN (UMNO)
N3	Kenering	Mohd Tarmizi Idris	BN (UMNO)
N4	Kota Tampan	Saarani Mohamad	BN (UMNO)
N5	Selama	Mohd Akmal Kamaruddin	PN (PAS)
N6	Kubu Gajah	Khalil Yahaya	PN (PAS)
N7	Batu Kurau	Muhammad Amin Zakaria	BN (UMNO)
N8	Titi Serong	Hasnul Zulkarnain Abdul Munaim (Note: Hasnul Zulkarnain Abd. Munaim contested the general election as a Pakatan Harapan (AMANAH) candidate, resigned from the party and became an independent on 9 March 2020 and whose membership was later terminated. He later joined BERSATU on the 29 July 2020 and later sacked from the party and became an independent on 23 March 2021.)	IND
N9	Kuala Kurau	Abdul Yunus Jamahri (Note: Abdul Junus Jamhari contested the general election as a Pakatan Harapan (PKR) candidate, defected and joined BERSATU on 9 March 2020.)	PN (BERSATU)
N10	Alor Pongsu	Sham Mat Sahat	BN (UMNO)
N11	Gunong Semanggol	Razman Zakaria	PN (PAS)
N12	Selinsing	Mohamad Noor Dawoo	BN (UMNO)
N13	Kuala Sepetang	Mohd. Kamaruddin Abu Bakar	BN (UMNO)
N14	Changkat Jering	Ahmad Saidi Mohamad Daud	BN (UMNO)
N15	Trong	Jamilah Zakaria	BN (UMNO)
N16	Kamunting	Muhd Fadhil Nuruddin	PH (AMANAH)
N17	Pokok Assam	Leow Thye Yih	PH (DAP)
N18	Aulong	Nga Kor Ming	PH (DAP)
N19	Chenderoh	Zainun Mat Noor	BN (UMNO)
N20	Lubok Merbau	Jurij Jalaluddin	BN (UMNO)
N21	Lintang	Mohd Zolkafly Harun	BN (UMNO)
N22	Jalong	Loh Sze Yee	PH (DAP)
N23	Manjoi	Asmuni Awi	PH (AMANAH)
N24	Hulu Kinta	Muhamad Arafat Varisai Mahamad	PH (PKR)
N25	Canning	Jenny Choy Tsi Jen	PH (DAP)
N26	Tebing Tinggi	Abdul Aziz Bari	PH (DAP)
N27	Pasir Pinji	Lee Chuan How	PH (DAP)
N28	Bercham	Ong Boon Piow	PH (DAP)
N29	Kepayang	Ko Chung Sen	PH (DAP)
N30	Buntong	Sivasubramaniam Athinarayanan (Note: Sivasubramaniam Athinarayanan contested the general election as a Pakatan Harapan (DAP) candidate, resigned from the party and became an independent on 9 March 2020 and whose membership was later terminated. He later joined GERAKAN on 26 June 2020. He later left the party and joined BERSATU on 5 March 2021.)	PN (BERSATU)
N31	Jelapang	Cheah Pou Hian	PH (DAP)
N32	Menglembu	Chaw Kam Foon	PH (DAP)
N33	Tronoh	Yong Choo Kiong (Note: Yong Choo Kiong contested the general election as a Pakatan Harapan (DAP) candidate, resigned from the party and became an independent on 9 March 2020 and whose membership was later terminated. He later then joined BERSATU on 5 March 2021, but exited the party and joined PBM in January 2022.)	PBM
N34	Bukit Chandan	Maslin Sham Razman	BN (UMNO)
N35	Manong	Mohamad Zuraimi Razali	BN (UMNO)
N36	Pengkalan Baharu	Abdul Manaf Hashim	BN (UMNO)
N37	Pantai Remis	Wong May Ing	PH (DAP)
N38	Astaka	Teoh Yee Chern	PH (DAP)
N39	Belanja	Khairudin Abu Hanipah	BN (UMNO)
N40	Bota	Khairul Shahril Mohamed	BN (UMNO)
N41	Malim Nawar	Leong Cheok Keng (Note: Leong Cheok Keng contested the general election as a Pakatan Harapan (DAP) candidate, sacked from the party and became an independent on 17 January 2021. Later he joined PBM in January 2022.)	PBM
N42	Keranji	Chong Zhemin	PH (DAP)
N43	Tulang Sekah	Nolee Ashilin Mohamed Radzi (Note: Nolee Ashilin Mohammed Radzi contested the general election as a Barisan Nasional (UMNO) candidate, formed an alliance with Pakatan Harapan on 12 May 2018 and so was expelled from UMNO on 14 May 2018. He later joined BERSATU on 9 March 2020.)	PN (BERSATU)
N44	Sungai Rapat	Mohammad Nizar Jamaluddin	PH (AMANAH)
N45	Simpang Pulai	Tan Kar Hing	PH (PKR)
N46	Teja	Ng Shy Ching	PH (PKR)
N47	Chenderiang	Ahmad Faizal Azumu	PN (BERSATU)
N48	Ayer Kuning	Samsudin Abu Hassan	BN (UMNO)
N49	Sungai Manik	Zainol Fadzi Paharudin (Note: Zainol Fadzi Paharuddin contested the general election as a Barisan Nasional (UMNO) candidate, formed an alliance with Pakatan Harapan on 12 May 2018, was so expelled from UMNO on 14 May 2018 and later joined Pakatan Harapan (BERSATU).)	PN (BERSATU)
N50	Kampong Gajah	Wan Norashikin Wan Noordin	BN (UMNO)
N51	Pasir Panjang	Yahaya Mat Nor	PH (AMANAH)
N52	Pangkor	Zambry Abdul Kadir	BN (UMNO)
N53	Rungkup	Shahrul Zaman Yahya	BN (UMNO)
N54	Hutan Melintang	Khairuddin Tarmizi	BN (UMNO)
N55	Pasir Bedamar	Terence Naidu	PH (DAP)
N56	Changkat Jong	Mohd Azhar Jamaluddin	BN (UMNO)
N57	Sungkai	Sivanesan Achalingam	PH (DAP)
N58	Slim	Mohd Zaidi Aziz from 29 August 2020 (Note: Mohd. Zaidi Aziz was elected a Barisan Nasional assemblyman after winning the by-election, following the death of assemblyman Mohd Khusairi Abdul Talib on July 15, 2020.)	BN (UMNO)
N58	Slim	Mohd. Khusairi Abdul Talib until 15 July 2020	BN (UMNO)
N59	Behrang	Aminuddin Zulkipli	PH (AMANAH)

=== 2022–2023 ===
15th Perak State Legislative Assembly
←	14th Assembly	16th Assembly	→

Overview
- Legislative body: Perak State Legislative Assembly
- Jurisdiction: Perak
- Meeting place: Bangunan Perak Darul Ridzuan, Ipoh
- Term: 19 December 2022 – TBD
- Election: 2022 state election
- Government: Perak State Executive Council
- Website: www.perak.gov.my
- Members: 59
- Speaker: Mohamad Zahir Abdul Khalid
- Deputy Speaker: Jenny Choy Tsi Jen
- Secretary: Shahrul Azam Shaari
- Government Leader: Saarani Mohammad
- Opposition Leader: Razman Zakaria
- Party control: Barisan Nasional

Sovereign
- Sultan: Sultan Nazrin Muizzuddin Shah

Sessions
- 1st: 19 December 2022 – TBD

No.	State Constituency	Member	Coalition (party)
BN 9 | PH 24 | PN 26
-	Non-MLA	Mohamad Zahir Abdul Khalid	BN (UMNO)
N1	Pengkalan Hulu	Mohamad Amin Roslan	PN (PAS)
N2	Temengor	Salbiah Mohamed	BN (UMNO)
N3	Kenering	Husairi Ariffin	PN (PAS)
N4	Kota Tampan	Saarani Mohamad	BN (UMNO)
N5	Selama	Mohd Akmal Kamaruddin	PN (PAS)
N6	Kubu Gajah	Khalil Yahaya	PN (PAS)
N7	Batu Kurau	Mohd Najmuddin Elias	PN (BERSATU)
N8	Titi Serong	Hakimi Hamzi Hayat	PN (PAS)
N9	Kuala Kurau	Abdul Yunus Jamahri	PN (BERSATU)
N10	Alor Pongsu	Noor Azman Ghazali	PN (PAS)
N11	Gunong Semanggol	Razman Zakaria	PN (PAS)
N12	Selinsing	Sallehuddin Abdullah	PN (PAS)
N13	Kuala Sepetang	Ahmad Man	PN (BERSATU)
N14	Changkat Jering	Rahim Ismail	PN (PAS)
N15	Trong	Muhammad Faisal Abdul Rahman	PN (PAS)
N16	Kamunting	Mohd Fakhrudin Abdul Aziz	PN (PAS)
N17	Pokok Assam	Ong Seng Guan	PH (DAP)
N18	Aulong	Teh Kok Lim	PH (DAP)
N19	Chenderoh	Syed Lukman Hakim Syed Mohd Zin	PN (BERSATU)
N20	Lubok Merbau	Azizi Mohamed Ridzuan	PN (PAS)
N21	Lintang	Mohd Zolkafly Harun	BN (UMNO)
N22	Jalong	Loh Sze Yee	PH (DAP)
N23	Manjoi	Mohd Hafez Sabri	PN (PAS)
N24	Hulu Kinta	Muhamad Arafat Varisai Mahamad	PH (PKR)
N25	Canning	Jenny Choy Tsi Jen	PH (DAP)
N26	Tebing Tinggi	Abdul Aziz Bari	PH (DAP)
N27	Pasir Pinji	Goh See Hua	PH (DAP)
N28	Bercham	Ong Boon Piow	PH (DAP)
N29	Kepayang	Nga Kor Ming	PH (DAP)
N30	Buntong	Thulsi Thivani Manogaran	PH (DAP)
N31	Jelapang	Cheah Pou Hian	PH (DAP)
N32	Menglembu	Chaw Kam Foon	PH (DAP)
N33	Tronoh	Steven Tiw Tee Siang	PH (DAP)
N34	Bukit Chandan	Hashim Bujang	PN (BERSATU)
N35	Manong	Berhanudin Ahmad	PN (PAS)
N36	Pengkalan Baharu	Azman Noh	BN (UMNO)
N37	Pantai Remis	Wong May Ing	PH (DAP)
N38	Astaka	Jason Ng Thien Yeong	PH (DAP)
N39	Belanja	Khairudin Abu Hanipah	BN (UMNO)
N40	Bota	Najihatussalehah Ahmad	PN (PAS)
N41	Malim Nawar	Bavani Veraiah	PH (DAP)
N42	Keranji	Angeline Koo Haai Yen	PH (DAP)
N43	Tulang Sekah	Mohd Azlan Helmi	PH (PKR)
N44	Sungai Rapat	Mohammad Nizar Jamaluddin	PH (AMANAH)
N45	Simpang Pulai	Wong Chai Yi	PH (PKR)
N46	Teja	Ng Shy Ching	PH (PKR)
N47	Chenderiang	Choong Shin Heng	BN (MCA)
N48	Ayer Kuning	Ishsam Shahruddin	BN (UMNO)
N49	Sungai Manik	Zainol Fadzi Paharudin	PN (BERSATU)
N50	Kampong Gajah	Zafarulazhan Zan	PN (PAS)
N51	Pasir Panjang	Rosli Abd Rahman	PN (BERSATU)
N52	Pangkor	Norhaslinda Zakaria	PN (BERSATU)
N53	Rungkup	Shahrul Zaman Yahya	BN (UMNO)
N54	Hutan Melintang	Wasanthee Sinnasamy	PH (PKR)
N55	Pasir Bedamar	Woo Kah Leong	PH (DAP)
N56	Changkat Jong	Nadziruddin Mohamed Bandi	PN (BERSATU)
N57	Sungkai	Sivanesan Achalingam	PH (DAP)
N58	Slim	Muhammad Zulfadli Zainal	PN (PAS)
N59	Behrang	Salina Samsudin	BN (UMNO)

== Pahang ==
=== 2018–2022 ===
14th Pahang State Legislative Assembly
←	13th Assembly	15th Assembly	→

Overview
- Legislative body: Pahang State Legislative Assembly
- Jurisdiction: Pahang
- Meeting place: Wisma Seri Pahang, Kuantan
- Term: 2 July 2018 – 14 October 2022
- Election: 2018 state election
- Government: Pahang State Executive Council
- Website: www.pahang.gov.my
- Members: 42
- Speaker: Ishak Muhammad
- Deputy Speaker: Mohamed Jaafar
- Secretary: Syed Ahmad Khirulanwar Alyahya Syed Abdul Rahman
- Government Leader: Wan Rosdy Wan Ismail
- Opposition Leader: Chiong Yoke Kong
- Party control: Barisan Nasional

Sovereign
- Sultan: Sultan Abdullah

Sessions
- 1st: 2 July 2018 – 14 October 2022

No.	State Constituency	Member	Coalition (party)
BN 25 | PH 9 | PN 8
-	Non-MLA	Ishak Muhamad	BN (UMNO)
N1	Tanah Rata	Chiong Yoke Kong	PH (DAP)
N2	Jelai	Wan Rosdy Wan Ismail	BN (UMNO)
N3	Padang Tengku	Mustapa Long	BN (UMNO)
N4	Cheka	Lee Ah Wong	BN (MCA)
N5	Benta	Mohd. Soffi Abd. Razak	BN (UMNO)
N6	Batu Talam	Abdul Aziz Mat Kiram	BN (UMNO)
N7	Tras	Chow Yu Hui	PH (DAP)
N8	Dong	Shahiruddin Ab Moin	BN (UMNO)
N9	Tahan	Mohd Zakhwan Ahmad Badarddin	PN (PAS)
N10	Damak	Zuridan Mohd Daud	PN (PAS)
N11	Pulau Tawar	Nazri Ngah	BN (UMNO)
N12	Beserah	Andansura Rabu	PN (PAS)
N13	Semambu	Lee Chean Chung	PH (PKR)
N14	Teruntum	Sim Chon Siang	PH (PKR)
N15	Tanjung Lumpur	Rosli Abdul Jabar	PN (PAS)
N16	Inderapura	Shafik Fauzan Sharif	BN (UMNO)
N17	Sungai Lembing	Md Sohaimi Mohamed Shah	BN (UMNO)
N18	Lepar	Abdul Rahim Muda	BN (UMNO)
N19	Panching	Mohd Tarmizi Yahaya	PN (PAS)
N20	Pulau Manis	Khairuddin Mahmud	BN (UMNO)
N21	Peramu Jaya	Sh Mohamed Puzi Sh Ali	BN (UMNO)
N22	Bebar	Mohd. Fakhruddin Mohd. Arif	BN (UMNO)
N23	Chini	Mohd Sharim Md Zain (from 4 July 2020) (Note: Mohd Sharim Md Zain was elected as a Barisan Nasional assemblyman on 4 July 2020 in a byelection following the death of assemblyman Abu Bakar Harun who died on May 4, 2020.)	BN (UMNO)
N23	Chini	Abu Bakar Harun (until 7 May 2020)	BN (UMNO)
N24	Luit	Mohd Sofian Abd Jalil	PN (PAS)
N25	Kuala Sentul	Shahaniza Shamsuddin	BN (UMNO)
N26	Chenor	Mujjibur Rahman Ishak	PN (PAS)
N27	Jenderak	Mohamed Jaafar	BN (UMNO)
N28	Kerdau	Syed Ibrahim Syed Ahmad	BN (UMNO)
N29	Jengka	Shahril Azman Abd Halim	PN (PAS)
N30	Mentakab	Woo Chee Wan	PH (DAP)
N31	Lanchang	Mohd Sharkar Shamsudin	BN (UMNO)
N32	Kuala Semantan	Nor Azmi Mat Ludin	BN (UMNO)
N33	Bilut	Lee Chin Chen	PH (DAP)
N34	Ketari	Young Syefura Othman	PH (DAP)
N35	Sabai	Kamache Doray Rajoo	PH (DAP)
N36	Pelangai	Adnan Yaakob	BN (UMNO)
N37	Guai	Norol Azali Sulaiman	BN (UMNO)
N38	Triang	Leong Yu Man	PH (DAP)
N39	Kemayan	Mohd Fadil Osman	BN (UMNO)
N40	Bukit Ibam	Samsiah Arshad	BN (UMNO)
N41	Muadzam Shah	Razali Kassim	BN (UMNO)
N42	Tioman	Mohd. Johari Husin	BN (UMNO)

=== 2022–2023 ===
15th Pahang State Legislative Assembly
←	14th Assembly	16th Assembly	→

Overview
- Legislative body: Pahang State Legislative Assembly
- Jurisdiction: Pahang
- Meeting place: Wisma Seri Pahang, Kuantan
- Term: 29 December 2022 – present
- Election: 2022 state election
- Government: Pahang State Executive Council
- Website: www.pahang.gov.my
- Members: 42
- Speaker: Mohd Sharkar Shamsudin
- Deputy Speaker: Lee Chin Chen
- Secretary: Syed Ahmad Khirulanwar Alyahya Syed Abdul Rahman
- Government Leader: Wan Rosdy Wan Ismail
- Opposition Leader: Tuan Ibrahim Tuan Man

Sovereign
- Sultan: Sultan Abdullah

Sessions
- 1st: 29 December 2022 – TBD

No.	State Constituency	Member	Coalition (party)
BN 17 | PH 8 | PN 17
-	Non-MLA	Mohd Sharkar Shamsudin	BN (UMNO)
N1	Tanah Rata	Ho Chi Yang	PH (DAP)
N2	Jelai	Wan Rosdy Wan Ismail	BN (UMNO)
N3	Padang Tengku	Mustapa Long	BN (UMNO)
N4	Cheka	Tuan Ibrahim Tuan Man	PN (PAS)
N5	Benta	Mohd. Soffi Abd. Razak	BN (UMNO)
N6	Batu Talam	Abdul Aziz Mat Kiram	BN (UMNO)
N7	Tras	Tengku Zulpuri Shah Raja Puji	PH (DAP)
N8	Dong	Fadzli Mohamad Kamal	BN (UMNO)
N9	Tahan	Mohd Zakhwan Ahmad Badarddin	PN (PAS)
N10	Damak	Zuridan Mohd Daud	PN (PAS)
N11	Pulau Tawar	Yohanis Ahmad	PN (PAS)
N12	Beserah	Andansura Rabu	PN (PAS)
N13	Semambu	Chan Chun Kuang	PH (PKR)
N14	Teruntum	Sim Chon Siang	PH (PKR)
N15	Tanjung Lumpur	Rosli Abdul Jabar	PN (PAS)
N16	Inderapura	Shafik Fauzan Sharif	BN (UMNO)
N17	Sungai Lembing	Mohamad Ayub Asri	PN (PAS)
N18	Lepar	Mohd Yazid Mohd Yunus	PN (BERSATU)
N19	Panching	Mohd Tarmizi Yahaya	PN (PAS)
N20	Pulau Manis	Mohammad Rafiq Khan Ahmad Khan	PN (PAS)
N21	Peramu Jaya	Mohd Nizar Mohd Najib	BN (UMNO)
N22	Bebar	Mohd. Fakhruddin Mohd. Arif	BN (UMNO)
N23	Chini	Mohd Sharim Md Zain	BN (UMNO)
N24	Luit	Mohd Sofian Abd Jalil	PN (PAS)
N25	Kuala Sentul	Jasri Jamaludin	PN (BERSATU)
N26	Chenor	Mujjibur Rahman Ishak	PN (PAS)
N27	Jenderak	Rodzuan Zaaba	BN (UMNO)
N28	Kerdau	Syed Ibrahim Syed Ahmad	BN (UMNO)
N29	Jengka	Shahril Azman Abd Halim	PN (PAS)
N30	Mentakab	Woo Chee Wan	PH (DAP)
N31	Lanchang	Hassan Omar	PN (PAS)
N32	Kuala Semantan	Hassanuddin Salim	PN (PAS)
N33	Bilut	Lee Chin Chen	PH (DAP)
N34	Ketari	Su Keong Siong	PH (DAP)
N35	Sabai	V. Arumugam	BN (MIC)
N36	Pelangai	Johari Harun	BN (UMNO)
N37	Guai	Sabariah Saidan	BN (UMNO)
N38	Triang	Leong Yu Man	PH (DAP)
N39	Kemayan	Khairulnizam Mohamad Zuldin	BN (UMNO)
N40	Bukit Ibam	Nazri Ahmad	PN (PAS)
N41	Muadzam Shah	Razali Kassim	BN (UMNO)
N42	Tioman	Mohd. Johari Husin	BN (UMNO)

== Selangor ==
=== 2018–2023 ===
14th Selangor State Legislative Assembly
←	13th Assembly	15th Assembly	→

Overview
- Legislative body: Selangor State Legislative Assembly
- Jurisdiction: Selangor
- Meeting place: Bangunan Sultan Salahuddin Abdul Aziz Shah
- Term: 26 June 2018 – 23 June 2023
- Election: 2018 state election
- Government: Selangor State Executive Council
- Website: dewan.selangor.gov.my
- Members: 56
- Speaker: Ng Suee Lim
- Deputy Speaker: Hasnul Baharuddin
- Secretary: Mohd. Khairul Ashraff Razali
- Government Leader: Amirudin Shari
- Opposition Leader: Rizam Ismail
- Party control: Pakatan Harapan

Sovereign
- Sultan: Sultan Sharafuddin Idris Shah

Sessions
- 1st: 26 June 2018 – 23 June 2023

No.	State Constituency	Member	Coalition (party)
PH 40 | PN 5 | BN 5 | GTA 3 | PBM 2 | WARISAN 1
N1	Sungai Air Tawar	Rizam Ismail	BN (UMNO)
N2	Sabak	Ahmad Mustain Othman (Note: Ahmad Mustain Othman contested the general election as a candidate of Pakatan Harapan (AMANAH), after which he was sacked by the party on 28 July 2020 and became an independent.)	PH (PKR)
N3	Sungai Panjang	Mohd. Imran Tamrin	BN (UMNO)
N4	Sekinchan	Ng Suee Lim	PH (DAP)
N5	Hulu Bernam	Rosni Sohar	BN (UMNO)
N6	Kuala Kubu Baharu	Lee Kee Hiong	PH (DAP)
N7	Batang Kali	Vacant	VAC
N7	Batang Kali	Harumaini Omar until 26 January 2023	GTA (PEJUANG)
N8	Sungai Burong	Mohd. Shamsudin Lias	BN (UMNO)
N9	Permatang	Rozana Zainal Abidin	PH (PKR)
N10	Bukit Melawati	Juwairiya Zulkifli	PH (PKR)
N11	Ijok	Idris Ahmad	PH (PKR)
N12	Jeram	Mohd. Shaid Rosli (Note: Mohd. Shaid Rosli contested the general election as a candidate of Pakatan Harapan (BERSATU), after which he quit the party on 8 August 2020 and became an independent.)	GTA (PEJUANG)
N13	Kuang	Sallehudin Amiruddin (Note: Sallehudin Amiruddin contested the general election as a candidate of Pakatan Harapan (BERSATU), after which he resigned from the party on 14 August 2020 and became an independent.)	GTA (PEJUANG)
N14	Rawang	Chua Wei Kiat	PH (PKR)
N15	Taman Templer	Mohd. Sany Hamzan	PH (AMANAH)
N16	Sungai Tua	Amirudin Shari	PH (PKR)
N17	Gombak Setia	Hilman Idham (Note: Hilman Idham contested the general election as a candidate of Pakatan Harapan (PKR), after which he was sacked by the party on 1 March 2020 and became an independent. He later then joined BERSATU on 19 March 2020.)	PN (BERSATU)
N18	Hulu Kelang	Saari Sungib	PH (AMANAH)
N19	Bukit Antarabangsa	Mohamed Azmin Ali (Note: Mohamed Azmin contested the general election as a candidate of Pakatan Harapan (PKR), after which he was sacked by the party on 24 February 2020 and became an independent. he later joined BERSATU on 22 August 2020.)	PN (BERSATU)
N20	Lembah Jaya	Haniza Mohamed Talha (Note: Haniza Mohamed Talha contested the general election as a Pakatan Harapan (PKR) candidate had her party membership suspended on 6 April 2020. She later was sacked by his party on 28 June 2020. She later joined BERSATU on 22 August 2020.)	PBM
N21	Pandan Indah	Izham Hashim	PH (AMANAH)
N22	Teratai	Lai Wai Chong	WARISAN
N23	Dusun Tua	Edry Faizal Eddy Yusof	PH (DAP)
N24	Semenyih	Zakaria Hanafi (Note: Zakaria Hanafi was elected a Barisan Nasional assemblyman after winning the by-election, following the death of assemblyman Bakthiar Mohd Nor.) from 2 March 2019	BN (UMNO)
N24	Semenyih	Bakhtiar Mohd Nor until 11 January 2019	PH (BERSATU)
N25	Kajang	Hee Loy Sian	PH (PKR)
N26	Sungai Ramal	Mazwan Johar	PH (AMANAH)
N27	Balakong	Wong Siew Ki (Note: Wong Siew Ki was elected as a Pakatan Harapan MP on 8 September 2018 in a by-election following the death of assemblyman Eddie Ng Tien Chee.) from 8 September 2018	PH (DAP)
N27	Balakong	Eddie Ng Tien Chee until 20 July 2018	PH (DAP)
N28	Seri Kembangan	Ean Yong Hian Wah	PH (DAP)
N29	Seri Serdang	Siti Mariah Mahmud	PH (AMANAH)
N30	Kinrara	Ng Sze Han	PH (DAP)
N31	Subang Jaya	Michelle Ng Mei Sze	PH (DAP)
N32	Seri Setia	Halimey Abu Bakar (Note: Halimey Abu Bakar was elected as a Pakatan Harapan MP on 8 September 2018 in a by-election following the death of assemblyman Shaharuddin Badaruddin due to colon cancer.) from 8 September 2018	PH (PKR)
N32	Seri Setia	Shaharuddin Badaruddin until 2 August 2018	PH (PKR)
N33	Taman Medan	Syamsul Firdaus Mohamed Supri	PH (PKR)
N34	Bukit Gasing	Rajiv Rishyakaran	PH (DAP)
N35	Kampung Tunku	Lim Yi Wei	PH (DAP)
N36	Bandar Utama	Jamaliah Jamaluddin	PH (DAP)
N37	Bukit Lanjan	Elizabeth Wong Keat Ping	PH (PKR)
N38	Paya Jaras	Mohd. Khairuddin Othman	PH (PKR)
N39	Kota Damansara	Shatiri Mansor	PH (PKR)
N40	Kota Anggerik	Najwan Halimi	PH (PKR)
N41	Batu Tiga	Rodziah Ismail	PH (PKR)
N42	Meru	Mohd. Fakhrulrazi Mohd. Mokhtar	PH (PKR)
N43	Sementa	Daroyah Alwi (Note: Daroyah Alwi contested the general election as a candidate of Pakatan Harapan (PKR), quit from her party membership on 13 June 2020 and became an independent. She later joined BERSATU on 22 August 2020.)	PBM
N44	Selat Klang	Abdul Rashid Asari	PN (BERSATU)
N45	Bandar Baru Klang	Teng Chang Khim	PH (DAP)
N46	Pelabuhan Klang	Azmizam Zaman Huri	PH (PKR)
N47	Pandamaran	Leong Tuck Chee	PH (DAP)
N48	Sentosa	Gunarajah George	PH (PKR)
N49	Sungai Kandis	Mohd. Zawawi Ahmad Mughni (Note: Mohd. Zawawi Ahmad Mughni was elected as a Pakatan Harapan MP on 4 August 2018 in a by-election following the death of assemblyman Mat Shuhaimi Shafie.)from 4 August 2018	PH (PKR)
N49	Sungai Kandis	Mat Shuhaimi Shafiei until 2 July 2018	PH (PKR)
N50	Kota Kemuning	Ganabatirau Veraman	PH (DAP)
N51	Sijangkang	Ahmad Yunus Hairi	PN (PAS)
N52	Banting	Lau Weng San	PH (DAP)
N53	Morib	Hasnul Baharuddin	PH (AMANAH)
N54	Tanjong Sepat	Borhan Aman Shah	PH (PKR)
N55	Dengkil	Adhif Syan Abdullah	PN (BERSATU)
N56	Sungai Pelek	Ronnie Liu Tian Khiew	PH (DAP)

== Negeri Sembilan ==
=== 2018–2023 ===
14th Negeri Sembilan State Legislative Assembly
←	13th Assembly	15th Assembly	→

Overview
- Legislative body: Negeri Sembilan State Legislative Assembly
- Jurisdiction: Negeri Sembilan
- Meeting place: Wisma Negeri, Negeri Sembilan
- Term: 2 July 2018 – present
- Election: 2018 state election
- Government: Negeri Sembilan State Executive Council
- Website: www.ns.gov.my
- Members: 36
- Speaker: Zulkefly Mohamad Omar
- Deputy Speaker: Ravi Munusamy
- Secretary: Mohd Amin Ludin
- Government Leader: Aminuddin Harun
- Opposition Leader: Mohamad Hasan
- Party control: Pakatan Harapan

Sovereign
- Yang di-Pertuan Besar: Tuanku Muhriz

Sessions
- 1st: 2 July 2018 – 1 July 2023

No.	State Constituency	Member	Coalition (party)
PH 20 | BN 16
N1	Chennah	Loke Siew Fook	PH (DAP)
N2	Pertang	Noor Azmi Yusuf	BN (UMNO)
N3	Sungai Lui	Mohd. Razi Mohd. Ali	BN (UMNO)
N4	Kelawang	Bakri Sawir	PH (AMANAH)
N5	Serting	Shamshulkahar Mohd. Deli	BN (UMNO)
N6	Palong	Mustafa Nagoor	BN (UMNO)
N7	Jeram Padang	Manickam Letchuman	BN (MIC)
N8	Bahau	Teo Kok Seong	PH (DAP)
N9	Lenggeng	Suhaimi Kassim	PH (AMANAH)
N10	Nilai	Arul Kumar Jambunathan	PH (DAP)
N11	Lobak	Chew Seh Yong	PH (DAP)
N12	Temiang	Ng Chin Tsai	PH (DAP)
N13	Sikamat	Aminuddin Harun	PH (PKR)
N14	Ampangan	Mohamad Rafie Abdul Malek	PH (PKR)
N15	Juasseh	Ismail Lasim	BN (UMNO)
N16	Seri Menanti	Abdul Samad Ibrahim	BN (UMNO)
N17	Senaling	Adnan Abu Hasan	BN (UMNO)
N18	Pilah	Mohamad Nazaruddin Sabtu	PH (PKR)
N19	Johol	Saiful Yazan Sulaiman	BN (UMNO)
N20	Labu	Ismail Ahmad	PH (PKR)
N21	Bukit Kepayang	Nicole Tan Lee Koon	PH (DAP)
N22	Rahang	Mary Josephine Pritam Singh	PH (DAP)
N23	Mambau	Yap Yew Weng	PH (DAP)
N24	Seremban Jaya	Gunasekaren Palasamy	PH (DAP)
N25	Paroi	Mohamad Taufek Abd. Ghani	PH (AMANAH)
N26	Chembong	Zaifulbahri Idris	BN (UMNO)
N27	Rantau	Mohamad Hasan (Note: Mohamad Hasan was elected as a Barisan Nasional assemblymen on 13 April 2019 in a by-election which was called by the Election Commission, after a court order nullified the previous results.)	BN (UMNO)
N28	Kota	Awaludin Said	BN (UMNO)
N29	Chuah	Yek Diew Ching	PH (PKR)
N30	Lukut	Choo Ken Hwa	PH (DAP)
N31	Bagan Pinang	Tun Hairuddin Abu Bakar	BN (UMNO)
N32	Linggi	Abdul Rahman Mohd Redza	BN (UMNO)
N33	Sri Tanjung	Ravi Munusamy	PH (PKR)
N34	Gemas	Abdul Razak Said	BN (UMNO)
N35	Gemencheh	Mohd. Isam Mohd. Isa	BN (UMNO)
N36	Repah	Veerapan Superamaniam	PH (DAP)

== Malacca ==
=== 2018–2021 ===
14th Malacca State Legislative Assembly
←	13th Assembly	15th Assembly	→

Overview
- Legislative body: Malacca State Legislative Assembly
- Jurisdiction: Malacca
- Meeting place: Seri Negeri Complex
- Term: 19 July 2018 – 4 October 2021
- Election: 2018 state election
- Government: Malacca State Executive Council
- Website: www.melaka.gov.my
- Members: 28
- Speaker: Sulaiman Md Ali
- Deputy Speaker: Ghazale Muhamad
- Secretary: Kamel Mohamad
- Government Leader: Sulaiman Md Ali
- Opposition Leader: Adly Zahari
- Party control: Barisan Nasional

Sovereign
- Yang di-Pertua Negeri: Mohd Ali Rustam

Sessions
- 1st: 19 July 2018 – 4 October 2021

The following data is correct as of 5 October 2021.

No.	State Constituency	Member	Coalition (party)
BN 12 | PH 11 | PN 1 | IND 4
N1	Kuala Linggi	Ismail Othman	BN (UMNO)
N2	Tanjung Bidara	Md. Rawi Mahmud	BN (UMNO)
N3	Ayer Limau	Amiruddin Yusop	BN (UMNO)
N4	Lendu	Sulaiman Md Ali	BN (UMNO)
N5	Taboh Naning	Latipah Omar	BN (UMNO)
N6	Rembia	Muhammad Jailani Khamis (Note: Muhammad Jailani Khamis contested the general election as a Pakatan Harapan (PKR) candidate, was sacked of his party membership and became an independent on 12 April 2020. He later joined UMNO on 2 January 2021.)	BN (UMNO)
N7	Gadek	Saminathan Ganesan	PH (DAP)
N8	Machap Jaya	Ginie Lim Siew Lin	PH (PKR)
N9	Durian Tunggal	Mohd. Sofi Abdul Wahab	PH (AMANAH)
N10	Asahan	Abdul Ghafar Atan	BN (UMNO)
N11	Sungai Udang	Idris Haron	IND
N12	Pantai Kundor	Nor Azman Hassan	IND
N13	Paya Rumput	Mohd Rafiq Naizamohideen	PN (BERSATU)
N14	Kelebang	Gue Teck	PH (PKR)
N15	Pengkalan Batu	Norhizam Hassan Baktee (Note: Norhizam Hassan Baktee contested the general election as a candidate of Pakatan Harapan (DAP), after which he was sacked by the party on 10 March 2020 and became an independent. He later joined BERSATU on 14 September 2020.)	IND
N16	Ayer Keroh	Kerk Chee Yee	PH (DAP)
N17	Bukit Katil	Adly Zahari	PH (AMANAH)
N18	Ayer Molek	Rahmad Mariman	BN (UMNO)
N19	Kesidang	Seah Shoo Chin	PH (DAP)
N20	Kota Laksamana	Low Chee Leong	PH (DAP)
N21	Duyong	Damian Yeo Shen Li	PH (DAP)
N22	Bandar Hilir	Tey Kok Kiew	PH (DAP)
N23	Telok Mas	Noor Effandi Ahmad	IND
N24	Bemban	Wong Fort Pin	PH (DAP)
N25	Rim	Ghazale Muhamad	BN (UMNO)
N26	Serkam	Zaidi Attan	BN (UMNO)
N27	Merlimau	Roslan Ahmad	BN (UMNO)
N28	Sungai Rambai	Hasan Abd. Rahman	BN (UMNO)

=== 2021–2023 ===
15th Malacca State Legislative Assembly
←	14th Assembly	16th Assembly	→

Overview
- Legislative body: Malacca State Legislative Assembly
- Jurisdiction: Malacca
- Meeting place: Seri Negeri Complex
- Term: 27 December 2021 – present
- Election: 2021 state election
- Government: Malacca State Executive Council
- Website: www.melaka.gov.my
- Members: 28
- Speaker: Ibrahim Durum
- Deputy Speaker: Khaidiriah Abu Zahar
- Secretary: Kamel Mohamad
- Government Leader: Sulaiman Md Ali
- Opposition Leader: Mohd Yadzil Yaakub
- Party control: Barisan Nasional

Sovereign
- Yang di-Pertua Negeri: Mohd Ali Rustam

No.	State Constituency	Member	Coalition (party)
BN 21 | PH 5 | PN 2
N1	Kuala Linggi	Rosli Abdullah	BN (UMNO)
N2	Tanjung Bidara	Ab Rauf Yusoh	BN (UMNO)
N3	Ayer Limau	Hameed Basheer	BN (UMNO)
N4	Lendu	Sulaiman Md Ali	BN (UMNO)
N5	Taboh Naning	Zulkiflee Mohd Zin	BN (UMNO)
N6	Rembia	Muhammad Jailani Khamis	BN (UMNO)
N7	Gadek	Shanmugam Ptcyhay	BN (MIC)
N8	Machap Jaya	Ngwe Hee Sem	BN (MCA)
N9	Durian Tunggal	Zahari Kalil	BN (UMNO)
N10	Asahan	Fairul Nizam Roslan	BN (UMNO)
N11	Sungai Udang	Mohd Aleef Yusof	PN (BERSATU)
N12	Pantai Kundor	Tuminah Kadi	BN (UMNO)
N13	Paya Rumput	Rais Yasin	BN (UMNO)
N14	Kelebang	Lim Ban Hong	BN (MCA)
N15	Pengkalan Batu	Kalsom Noordin	BN (UMNO)
N16	Ayer Keroh	Kerk Chee Yee	PH (DAP)
N17	Bukit Katil	Adly Zahari	PH (AMANAH)
N18	Ayer Molek	Rahmad Mariman	BN (UMNO)
N19	Kesidang	Seah Shoo Chin	PH (DAP)
N20	Kota Laksamana	Low Chee Leong	PH (DAP)
N21	Duyong	Mohd Noor Helmy Abdul Halem	BN (UMNO)
N22	Bandar Hilir	Leng Chau Yen	PH (DAP)
N23	Telok Mas	Abdul Razak Abdul Rahman	BN (UMNO)
N24	Bemban	Mohd Yadzil Yaakub	PN (BERSATU)
N25	Rim	Khaidiriah Abu Zahar	BN (UMNO)
N26	Serkam	Zaidi Attan	BN (UMNO)
N27	Merlimau	Muhamad Akmal Saleh	BN (UMNO)
N28	Sungai Rambai	Siti Faizah Abdul Azis	BN (UMNO)

== Johor ==
=== 2018–2022 ===
14th Johor State Legislative Assembly
←	13th Assembly	15th Assembly	→

Overview
- Legislative body: Johor State Legislative Assembly
- Jurisdiction: Johor
- Meeting place: Sultan Ismail Building
- Term: 28 June 2018 – 22 January 2022
- Election: 2018 state election
- Government: Johor State Executive Council
- Website: www.johor.gov.my
- Members: 56
- Speaker: Suhaizan Kayat
- Deputy Speaker: Gan Peck Cheng
- Secretary: Shubanah Yusuf
- Government Leader: Hasni Mohammad
- Opposition Leader: Aminolhuda Hassan
- Party control: Barisan Nasional

Sovereign
- Sultan: Sultan Ibrahim

Sessions
- 1st: 28 June 2018 – 22 January 2022

The following data is correct as of 22 January 2022.

No.	State Constituency	Member	Coalition (party)
PH 27 | BN 16 | PN 12 | VAC 1
N1	Buloh Kasap	Zahari Sarip	BN (UMNO)
N2	Jementah	Tan Chen Choon	PH (DAP)
N3	Pemanis	Chong Fat Full (Note: Chong Fat Full contested the general election as a Pakatan Harapan (PKR) candidate quit his party membership to become an independent on 4 March 2020. He joined BERSATU on 22 August 2020.)	PN (BERSATU)
N4	Kemelah	Sulaiman Mohd Nor	PH (AMANAH)
N5	Tenang	Mohd Solihan Badri	PN (BERSATU)
N6	Bekok	Ramakrishnan Suppiah	PH (DAP)
N7	Bukit Kepong	Sahruddin Jamal	PN (BERSATU)
N8	Bukit Pasir	Najib Lep	PN (PAS)
N9	Gambir	Muhyiddin Mohd. Yassin	PN (BERSATU)
N10	Tangkak	Ee Chin Li	PH (DAP)
N11	Serom	Faizul Amri Adnan	PH (PKR)
N12	Bentayan	Ng Yak Howe	PH (DAP)
N13	Simpang Jeram	Salahuddin Ayub	PH (AMANAH)
N14	Bukit Naning	Mohd Ysahruddin Kusni	PH (PKR)
N15	Maharani	Nor Hayati Bachok	PH (AMANAH)
N16	Sungai Balang	Zaiton Ismail	BN (UMNO)
N17	Semerah	Mohd Khuzzan Abu Bakar	PH (PKR)
N18	Sri Medan	Zulkurnain Kamisan	BN (UMNO)
N19	Yong Peng	Chew Peck Choo	PH (DAP)
N20	Semarang	Samsolbari Jamali	BN (UMNO)
N21	Parit Yaani	Aminolhuda Hassan	PH (AMANAH)
N22	Parit Raja	Nor Rashidah Ramli	BN (UMNO)
N23	Penggaram	Gan Peck Cheng	PH (DAP)
N24	Senggarang	Khairuddin Abdul Rahim	PH (PKR)
N25	Rengit	Ayub Jamil	BN (UMNO)
N26	Machap	Abdul Taib Abu Bakar	BN (UMNO)
N27	Layang-layang	Onn Hafiz Ghazi	BN (UMNO)
N28	Mengkibol	Chew Chong Sin	PH (DAP)
N29	Mahkota	Muhamad Said Jonit	PH (PKR)
N30	Paloh	Sheikh Umar Bagharib Ali	PH (DAP)
N31	Kahang	Vidyananthan Ramanadhan	BN (MIC)
N32	Endau	Alwiyah Talib (Note: Alwiyah Talib contested the general election as a Barisan Nasional (UMNO) candidate, officially switch allegiance to Pakatan Harapan (PPBM) on 25 November 2018 with other two assemblyman.)	PN (BERSATU)
N33	Tenggaroh	Raven Kumar Krishnasamy	BN (MIC)
N34	Panti	Hahasrin Hashim	BN (UMNO)
N35	Pasir Raja	Rashidah Ismail	BN (UMNO)
N36	Sedili	Rasman Ithnain (Note: Rasman Ithnain contested the general election as a Barisan Nasional (UMNO) candidate, officially switch allegiance to Pakatan Harapan (PPBM) on 19 November 2018.)	PN (BERSATU)
N37	Johor Lama	Rosleli Jahari (Note: Rosleli Jahari contested the general election as a Barisan Nasional (UMNO) candidate, officially switch allegiance to Pakatan Harapan (PPBM) on 19 November 2018.)	PN (BERSATU)
N38	Penawar	Sharifah Azizah Syed Zain	BN (UMNO)
N39	Tanjung Surat	Syed Sis Syed Abdul Rahman	BN (UMNO)
N40	Tiram	Gopalakrishnan Subramaniam	PH (PKR)
N41	Puteri Wangsa	Mazlan Bujang	PN (BERSATU)
N42	Johor Jaya	Liow Cai Tung	PH (DAP)
N43	Permas	Che Zakaria Mohd Salleh	PN (BERSATU)
N44	Larkin	Mohammad Izhar Ahmad	PN (BERSATU)
N45	Stulang	Chen Kah Eng	PH (DAP)
N46	Perling	Cheo Yee How	PH (DAP)
N47	Kempas	Vacant since 21 December 2021	VAC
N47	Kempas	Osman Sapian until 21 December 2021	PN (BERSATU)
N48	Skudai	Tan Hong Pin	PH (DAP)
N49	Kota Iskandar	Dzulkefly Ahmad	PH (AMANAH)
N50	Bukit Permai	Tosrin Jarvanthi	PN (BERSATU)
N51	Bukit Batu	Jimmy Puah Wee Tse	PH (PKR)
N52	Senai	Tee Boon Tsong	PH (DAP)
N53	Benut	Hasni Mohammad	BN (UMNO)
N54	Pulai Sebatang	Muhammad Taqiuddin Cheman	PH (AMANAH)
N55	Pekan Nanas	Yeo Tung Siong	PH (DAP)
N56	Kukup	Md. Othman Yusof	BN (UMNO)

=== 2022–2023 ===
15th Johor State Legislative Assembly
←	14th Assembly	16th Assembly	→

Overview
- Legislative body: Johor State Legislative Assembly
- Jurisdiction: Johor
- Meeting place: Sultan Ismail Building
- Term: 21 April 2022 – present
- Election: 2022 state election
- Government: Johor State Executive Council
- Website: www.johor.gov.my
- Members: 56
- Speaker: Mohd Puad Zarkashi
- Deputy Speaker: Samsolbari Jamali
- Secretary: Shubanah Yusuf
- Government Leader: Onn Hafiz Ghazi
- Opposition Leader: Andrew Chen Kah Eng
- Party control: Barisan Nasional

Sovereign
- Sultan: Sultan Ibrahim

Sessions
- 1st: 21 April 2022 – present

No.	State Constituency	Member	Coalition (party)
BN 40 | PH 12 | PN 3 | MUDA 1
N1	Buloh Kasap	Zahari Sarip	BN (UMNO)
N2	Jementah	Ng Kor Sim	PH (DAP)
N3	Pemanis	Anuar Abdul Manap	BN (UMNO)
N4	Kemelah	Saraswathy Nallathamby	BN (MIC)
N5	Tenang	Haslinda Salleh	BN (UMNO)
N6	Bekok	Tan Chong	BN (MCA)
N7	Bukit Kepong	Sahruddin Jamal	PN (BERSATU)
N8	Bukit Pasir	Mohamad Fazli Mohamad Salleh	BN (UMNO)
N9	Gambir	Sahrihan Jani	BN (UMNO)
N10	Tangkak	Ee Chin Li	PH (DAP)
N11	Serom	Khairin Nisa Ismail	BN (UMNO)
N12	Bentayan	Ng Yak Howe	PH (DAP)
N13	Simpang Jeram	Salahuddin Ayub	PH (AMANAH)
N14	Bukit Naning	Fuad Tukirin	BN (UMNO)
N15	Maharani	Abdul Aziz Talib	PN (PAS)
N16	Sungai Balang	Selamat Takim	BN (UMNO)
N17	Semerah	Mohd Fared Mohd Khalid	BN (UMNO)
N18	Sri Medan	Zulkurnain Kamisan	BN (UMNO)
N19	Yong Peng	Ling Tian Soon	BN (MCA)
N20	Semarang	Samsolbari Jamali	BN (UMNO)
N21	Parit Yaani	Mohamad Najib Samuri	BN (UMNO)
N22	Parit Raja	Nor Rashidah Ramli	BN (UMNO)
N23	Penggaram	Gan Peck Cheng	PH (DAP)
N24	Senggarang	Mohd Yusla Ismail	BN (UMNO)
N25	Rengit	Mohd Puad Zarkashi	BN (UMNO)
N26	Machap	Onn Hafiz Ghazi	BN (UMNO)
N27	Layang-Layang	Abd. Mutalip Abd. Rahim	BN (UMNO)
N28	Mengkibol	Chew Chong Sin	PH (DAP)
N29	Mahkota	Sharifah Azizah Syed Zain	BN (UMNO)
N30	Paloh	Lee Ting Han	BN (MCA)
N31	Kahang	Vidyananthan Ramanadhan	BN (MIC)
N32	Endau	Alwiyah Talib	PN (BERSATU)
N33	Tenggaroh	Raven Kumar Krishnasamy	BN (MIC)
N34	Panti	Hahasrin Hashim	BN (UMNO)
N35	Pasir Raja	Rashidah Ismail	BN (UMNO)
N36	Sedili	Muszaide Makmor	BN (UMNO)
N37	Johor Lama	Norlizah Noh	BN (UMNO)
N38	Penawar	Fauziah Misri	BN (UMNO)
N39	Tanjung Surat	Aznan Tamin	BN (UMNO)
N40	Tiram	Azizul Bachok	BN (UMNO)
N41	Puteri Wangsa	Amira Aisya Abdul Aziz	MUDA
N42	Johor Jaya	Liow Cai Tung	PH (DAP)
N43	Permas	Baharudin Mohamed Taib	BN (UMNO)
N44	Larkin	Mohd Hairi Mad Shah	BN (UMNO)
N45	Stulang	Andrew Chen Kah Eng	PH (DAP)
N46	Perling	Liew Chin Tong	PH (DAP)
N47	Kempas	Ramlee Bohani	BN (UMNO)
N48	Skudai	Marina Ibrahim	PH (DAP)
N49	Kota Iskandar	Pandak Ahmad	BN (UMNO)
N50	Bukit Permai	Mohd Jafni Md Shukor	BN (UMNO)
N51	Bukit Batu	Arthur Chiong Sen Sern	PH (PKR)
N52	Senai	Wong Bor Yang	PH (DAP)
N53	Benut	Hasni Mohammad	BN (UMNO)
N54	Pulai Sebatang	Hasrunizah Hassan	BN (UMNO)
N55	Pekan Nanas	Tan Eng Meng	BN (MCA)
N56	Kukup	Jefridin Atan	BN (UMNO)

== Sabah ==
=== 2018–2020 ===
15th Sabah State Legislative Assembly
←	14th Assembly	16th Assembly	→

Overview
- Legislative body: Sabah State Legislative Assembly
- Jurisdiction: Sabah
- Meeting place: Sabah State Legislative Assembly Building
- Term: 11 June 2018 – 30 July 2020
- Election: 2018 state election
- Government: Shafie I
- Website: www.sabah.gov.my/dun
- Members: 60 elected members 5 nominated members
- Speaker: Syed Abas Syed Ali
- Deputy Speaker: George Anthony Ginibun
- Secretary: Bernard Joseph Dalinting; Shafaruddin Halide
- Government Leader: Mohd. Shafie Apdal
- Opposition Leader: Musa Aman
- Party control: WARISAN–PH–UPKO coalition

Sovereign
- Yang di-Pertua Negeri: Juhar Mahiruddin

Sessions
- 1st: 11 June 2018 – 31 December 2018
- 2nd: 5 August 2019 – 31 December 2019
- 3rd: 16 April 2020 – 30 July 2020

The following data is correct as of 24 September 2020.

No.	State Constituency	Member	Coalition (party)
WARISAN 23 | PN 17 | PH 7 | GBS 4 | BN 3 | UPKO 2 | IND 9
N1	Banggi	Mohammad Mohamarin	WARISAN
N2	Tanjong Kapor	Ben Chong Chen Bin	WARISAN
N3	Pitas	Bolkiah Ismail (Note: Bolkiah Ismail contested the state election as a Barisan Nasional (UMNO) candidate, switching allegiance to WARISAN on 13 May 2018. His WARISAN membership was automatically terminated on 29 July 2020 and he became an independent.)	IND
N4	Matunggong	Julita Mojungki (Note: Julita Mojungki contested the state election as a Barisan Nasional (PBS) candidate, after which his party decided to leave BN on 12 May 2018.)	GBS (PBS)
N5	Tandek	Anita Baranting (Note: Anita Baranting contested the state election as a Barisan Nasional (PBS) candidate, after which her party decided to leave BN on 12 May 2018 and after which she joined WARISAN on 6 March 2019. Her WARISAN membership was automatically terminated on 29 July 2020 and she became an independent. On 24 September 2020, she joined STAR)	PN (STAR)
N6	Tempasuk	Musbah Jamli (Note: Musbah Jamli contested the state election as a Barisan Nasional (UMNO) candidate, after which he left the party became an independent on 12 December 2018, joining WARISAN on 25 January 2019. His WARISAN membership was automatically terminated on 29 July 2020 and he became an independent.)	IND
N7	Kadamaian	Ewon Benedick (Note: Ewon Benedick contested the state election as a Barisan Nasional (UPKO) candidate, after which he became one of the six members of the UPKO in forming an alliance with WARISAN on 12 May 2018.)	UPKO
N8	Usukan	Japlin Akim (Note: Japlin Akim contested the state election as a Barisan Nasional (UMNO) candidate, after which he left the party became an independent on 12 December 2018. He later joined BERSATU on 6 April 2019.)	PN (BERSATU)
N9	Tamparuli	Jahid Jahim (Note: Jahid Jahim contested the state election as a direct Barisan Nasional (PBS) candidate, his party decide to leaving BN on 12 May 2018.)	GBS (PBS)
N10	Sulaman	Hajiji Mohd Noor (Note: Hajiji Noor contested the state election as a Barisan Nasional (UMNO) candidate, after which he left the party became an independent on 12 December 2018, later joining BERSATU (Pakatan Harapan).)	PN (BERSATU)
N11	Kiulu	Joniston Lumai @ Bangkuai (Note: Joniston Bangkuai contested the state election as a direct Barisan Nasional (PBS) candidate, his party decide to leaving BN on 12 May 2018.)	GBS (PBS)
N12	Karambunai	Azhar Matussin	WARISAN
N13	Inanam	Kenny Chua Teck Ho (Note: Kenny Chua Teck Ho contested the state election as a Pakatan Harapan (PKR) candidate, after which he was sacked by the party on 30 July 2020 and became an independent, later joining Perikatan Nasional (STAR) on 22 September 2020)	PN (STAR)
N14	Likas	Tan Lee Fatt	PH (DAP)
N15	Api-Api	Liew Chin Jin	PH (PKR)
N16	Luyang	Phoong Jin Zhe	PH (DAP)
N17	Tanjong Aru	Wong Hong Jun	WARISAN
N18	Petagas	Uda Sulai	WARISAN
N19	Kapayan	Jannie Lasimbang	PH (DAP)
N20	Moyog	Jennifer Lasimbang	WARISAN
N21	Kawang	Ghulam Haidar Khan Bahadar (Note: Ghulam Haidar Khan Bahadar contested the state election as a Barisan Nasional (UMNO) candidate, after which he left the party became an independent on 12 December 2018. He later joined BERSATU on 6 April 2019.)	PN (BERSATU)
N22	Pantai Manis	Aidi Moktar	WARISAN
N23	Bongawan	Daud Yusof	WARISAN
N24	Membakut	Mohd. Arifin Mohd. Arif (Note: Mohd. Arifin Mohd. Arif contested the state election as a Barisan Nasional (UMNO) candidate, after which he left the party became an independent on 12 December 2018. He later joined BERSATU on 6 April 2019.)	PN (BERSATU)
N25	Klias	Isnin Aliasnih (Note: Isnin Aliasnih contested the state election as a Barisan Nasional (UMNO) candidate, after which he left the party became an independent on 12 December 2018. He later joined BERSATU on 6 April 2019.)	PN (BERSATU)
N26	Kuala Penyu	Limus Jury (Note: Limus Jury contested the state election as a direct Barisan Nasional (UPKO) candidate, he was one of the six members of the party who formed an alliance with WARISAN on 13 May 2018. He later quit UPKO on 15 June 2020 and became and independent. He later was nominated in 2020 Sabah election as Bersatu candidate)	PN (BERSATU)
N27	Lumadan	Matbali Musah (Note: Matbali Musah contested the state election as a Barisan Nasional (UMNO) candidate, after which he left the party became an independent on 12 December 2018. He later joined BERSATU on 6 April 2019.)	PN (BERSATU)
N28	Sindumin	Yusof Yacob	WARISAN
N29	Kundasang	Joachim Gunsalam (Note: Joachim Gunsalam contested the state election as a direct Barisan Nasional (PBS) candidate, his party decide to leaving BN on 12 May 2018.)	GBS (PBS)
N30	Karanaan	Masidi Manjun (Note: Masidi Manjun contested the state election as a Barisan Nasional (UMNO) candidate, after which he left the party became an independent on 12 December 2018, later joining BERSATU (Pakatan Harapan).)	PN (BERSATU)
N31	Paginatan	Abidin Madingkir (Note: Abidin Madingkir contested the state election as a direct Barisan Nasional (UPKO) candidate, he was one of the six members of the party who decided to form an alliance with WARISAN on 12 May 2018. He was however sacked by the party on 30 July 2020 and became and independent. He later joined STAR on 23 August 2020.)	PN (STAR)
N32	Tambunan	Jeffrey Kitingan	PN (STAR)
N33	Bingkor	Robert Tawik Nordin	PN (STAR)
N34	Liawan	Rasinin Kautis	WARISAN
N35	Melalap	Peter Anthony	WARISAN
N36	Kemabong	Jamawi Ja’afar (Note: Jamawi Ja'afar contested the state election as a direct Barisan Nasional (UMNO) candidate, switch allegiance to WARISAN on 12 May 2018. His WARISAN membership was automatically terminated on 29 July 2020 and he became an independent. He was late nominated in 2020 Sabah election as UMNO candidate)	BN (UMNO)
N37	Sook	Ellron Alfred Angin (Note: Ellron Angin contested the state election as a direct Barisan Nasional (PBRS) candidate, his party decide to leaving BN on 12 May 2018. On 16 December 2018 he joined STAR)	PN (STAR)
N38	Nabawan	Bobbey Ah Fang Suan (Note: Bobbey Ah Fang Suan contested the state election as a direct Barisan Nasional (UPKO) candidate. It was known that he is the only UPKO member that refused to seal an alliance with WARISAN as was done by six other members of his party. He later joined PPBM (Pakatan Harapan) on April 6, 2019.)	PN (BERSATU)
N39	Sugut	James Ratib (Note: James Ratib contested the state election as a direct Barisan Nasional (UMNO) candidate, he was one of the six members of the party who decided to form an alliance with WARISAN on 13 May 2018. He later quit UPKO on 15 June 2020 and became an independent. He later was nominated in 2020 Sabah election as UMNO candidate)	BN (UMNO)
N40	Labuk	Abd. Rahman Kongkawang (Note: Abd. Rahman Kongkawang contested the state election as a direct Barisan Nasional (PBS) candidate, his party decide to leaving BN on 12 May 2018, however he switched allegiance to WARISAN on 27 September 2019. His WARISAN membership was automatically terminated on 29 July 2020 and he became an independent.)	IND
N41	Gum-Gum	Arunarsin Taib	WARISAN
N42	Sungai Sibuga	Musa Aman (Note: UMNO Sabah joined Gabungan Bersatu Sabah on 14 August 2018 but remained with Barisan Nasional at federal level.)	BN (UMNO)
N43	Sekong	Arifin Asgali	WARISAN
N44	Karamunting	George Hiew Vun Zin	WARISAN
N45	Elopura	Calvin Chong Ket Kiun	PH (DAP)
N46	Tanjong Papat	Frankie Poon Ming Fung	PH (DAP)
N47	Kuamut	Masiung Banah (Note: Masiung Banah contested the state election as a direct Barisan Nasional (UPKO) candidate, he was one of the six members of the party who decided to form an alliance with WARISAN on 13 May 2018. He left UPKO on 24 November 2018 to becoming an independent and finally joined WARISAN on 18 December 2018. His WARISAN membership was automatically terminated on 29 July 2020 and he became an independent.)	IND
N48	Sukau	Saddi Abdu Rahman (Note: Saddi Abdul Rahman contested the state election as a direct Barisan Nasional (UMNO) candidate, left the party on 1 August 2018 and switch allegiance to WARISAN on 10 December 2018. His WARISAN membership was automatically terminated on 29 July 2020 and he became an independent.)	IND
N49	Tungku	Assaffal P. Alian	WARISAN
N50	Lahad Datu	Dumi Pg. Masdal	WARISAN
N51	Kunak	Norazlinah Arif	WARISAN
N52	Sulabayan	Jaujan Sambakong	WARISAN
N53	Senallang	Mohd. Shafie Apdal	WARISAN
N54	Bugaya	Manis Muka Mohd Darah	WARISAN
N55	Balung	Osman Jamal (Note: Osman Jamal contested the state election as a direct Barisan Nasional (UMNO) candidate, expressing intention to switch allegiance to People's Justice Party (PKR), however joining WARISAN instead. His WARISAN membership was automatically terminated on 29 July 2020 and he became an independent.)	IND
N56	Apas	Nizam Abu Bakar Titingan (Note: Nizam Abu Bakar Titingan contested the state election as a Barisan Nasional (UMNO) candidate, after which he left the party became an independent on 12 December 2018. He later joined BERSATU on 6 April 2020.)	PN (BERSATU)
N57	Sri Tanjong	Jimmy Wong Sze Phin	PH (DAP)
N58	Merotai	Sarifuddin Hata	WARISAN
N59	Tanjong Batu	Hamisa Samat (Note: Hamisah Samat contested the state election as a direct Barisan Nasional (UMNO) candidate, switch allegiance to WARISAN on 12 May 2018. His WARISAN membership was automatically terminated on 29 July 2020 and he became an independent.)	IND
N60	Sebatik	Abdul Muis Picho (Note: Abd. Muis Picho contested the state election as a direct Barisan Nasional (UMNO) candidate, switch allegiance to WARISAN on 12 May 2018. His WARISAN membership was automatically terminated on 29 July 2020 and he became an independent. He later was nominated in 2020 Sabah election as Bersatu candidate)	PN (BERSATU)
–	Nominated member	Wilfred Madius Tangau (Note: Wilfred Madius Tangau contested the parliamentary election as a direct Barisan Nasional (UPKO) candidate for Tuaran, he was one of the six members of the party who decided to form an alliance with WARISAN on 12 May 2018, and was made a nominated member of the State Legislative Assembly on 16 May 2018.)	UPKO
–	Nominated member	Lorreto Padua Jr. (Note: Loretto Padua Jr. was made a nominated member of the State Legislative Assembly on 11 June 2018.)	WARISAN
–	Nominated member	Terrence Siambun (Note: Terrence Siambun represented Moyog in the previous Assembly but did not contest in the state election. Terrence was made a nominated member of the State Legislative Assembly on 11 June 2018.)	WARISAN
–	Nominated member	Jaffari Waliam (Note: Jaffari Waliam, from PKR Pakatan Harapan was made a nominated member of the State Legislative Assembly on 20 September 2018, but quit the party on 28 February 2020 and became an independent.)	IND
–	Nominated member	Loh Ee Eng Ronnie (Note: Loh Ee Eng Ronnie was made a nominated member of the State Legislative Assembly on 21 May 2019, replacing the late Stephen Wong Tien Fatt who was previously made a nominated member in the state assembly on 16 May 2018, and who died on 28 March 2019. He was however sacked from the party on 30 July 2020 and became and independent.)	IND
–	Nominated Member	Stephen Wong Tien Fatt until 28 March 2019	PH (DAP)

=== 2020–2023 ===
16th Sabah State Legislative Assembly
←	15th Assembly	17th Assembly	→

Overview
- Legislative body: Sabah State Legislative Assembly
- Jurisdiction: Sabah
- Meeting place: Sabah State Legislative Assembly Building
- Election: 2020 state election
- Government: Hajiji I
- Website: www.sabah.gov.my/dun
- Members: 73 elected members 6 nominated members
- Speaker: Kadzim M Yahya
- Secretary: Shafaruddin Halide; Rafidah Maqbol Rahman
- Government Leader: Hajiji Noor
- Opposition Leader: Shafie Apdal
- Party control: Gabungan Rakyat Sabah

Sovereign
- Yang di-Pertua Negeri: Juhar Mahiruddin

No.	State Constituency	Member	Coalition (party)
GRS 42 | WARISAN 14 | BN 13 | PH 7 | KDM 2 | PN 1
N1	Banggi	Mohammad Mohamarin	GRS (GAGASAN)
N2	Bengkoka	Harun Durabi	BN (UMNO)
N3	Pitas	Ruddy Awah	GRS (GAGASAN)
N4	Tanjong Kapor	Chong Chen Bin @ Ben Chong	GRS (GAGASAN)
N5	Matunggong	Julita Mojungki	GRS (PBS)
N6	Bandau	Wetrom Bahanda	KDM
N7	Tandek	Hendrus Anding	GRS (PBS)
N8	Pintasan	Fairuz Renddan	GRS (GAGASAN)
N9	Tempasuk	Mohd Arsad Bistari	GRS (GAGASAN)
N10	Usukan	Mohd. Salleh Mohd. Said	BN (UMNO)
N11	Kadamaian	Ewon Benedick	PH (UPKO)
N12	Sulaman	Hajiji Noor	GRS (GAGASAN)
N13	Pantai Dalit	Jasnih Daya	GRS (GAGASAN)
N14	Tamparuli	Jahid Jahim	GRS (PBS)
N15	Kiulu	Joniston Bangkuai	GRS (PBS)
N16	Karambunai	Yakub Khan	BN (UMNO)
N17	Darau	Azhar Matussin	WARISAN
N18	Inanam	Peto Galim	PH (PKR)
N19	Likas	Tan Lee Fatt	PH (DAP)
N20	Api-Api	Christina Liew Chin Jin	PH (PKR)
N21	Luyang	Ginger Phoong Jin Zhe	PH (DAP)
N22	Tanjung Aru	Wong Hong Jun @ Junz Wong	WARISAN
N23	Petagas	Awang Ahmad Sah Awang Sahari	GRS (GAGASAN)
N24	Tanjung Keramat	Shahelmey Yahya	BN (UMNO)
N25	Kapayan	Jannie Lasimbang	PH (DAP)
N26	Moyog	Darell Leiking	WARISAN
N27	Limbahau	Juil Nuatim	GRS (Direct)
N28	Kawang	Ghulam Haidar Khan Bahadar	GRS (GAGASAN)
N29	Pantai Manis	Mohd. Tamin Zainal	BN (UMNO)
N30	Bongawan	Daud Yusof	WARISAN
N31	Membakut	Mohd. Arifin Mohd. Arif	GRS (GAGASAN)
N32	Klias	Isnin Aliasnih	GRS (GAGASAN)
N33	Kuala Penyu	Limus Jury	GRS (GAGASAN)
N34	Lumadan	Ruslan Muharam	GRS (PBS)
N35	Sindumin	Yusof Yacob	GRS (GAGASAN)
N36	Kundasang	Joachim Gunsalam	GRS (PBS)
N37	Karanaan	Masidi Manjun	GRS (GAGASAN)
N38	Paginatan	Abidin Madingkir	GRS (STAR)
N39	Tambunan	Jeffrey Gapari Kitingan	GRS (STAR)
N40	Bingkor	Robert Tawik	GRS (STAR)
N41	Liawan	Annuar Ayub Aman	GRS (STAR)
N42	Melalap	Peter Anthony	KDM
N43	Kemabong	Rubin Balang	GRS (GAGASAN)
N44	Tulid	Flovia Ng	GRS (STAR)
N45	Sook	Ellron Alfred Angin	GRS (STAR)
N46	Nabawan	Abdul Ghani Mohamed Yassin	GRS (GAGASAN)
N47	Telupid	Jonnybone J. Kurum	GRS (PBS)
N48	Sugut	James Ratib	GRS (GAGASAN)
N49	Labuk	Samad Jambri	GRS (GAGASAN)
N50	Gum-Gum	Arunarsin Taib	WARISAN
N51	Sungai Manila	Mokran Ingkat	BN (UMNO)
N52	Sungai Sibuga	Mohamad Hamsan Awang Supain	BN (UMNO)
N53	Sekong	Alias Sani	WARISAN
N54	Karamunting	George Hiew Vun Zin	GRS (GAGASAN)
N55	Elopura	Calvin Chong Ket Kiun	WARISAN
N56	Tanjong Papat	Frankie Poon Ming Fung	PH (DAP)
N57	Kuamut	Masiung Banah	GRS (GAGASAN)
N58	Lamag	Bung Moktar Radin	BN (UMNO)
N59	Sukau	Jafry Arifin	BN (UMNO)
N60	Tungku	Assaffal P. Alian	WARISAN
N61	Segama	Mohammadin Ketapi	BN (UMNO)
N62	Silam	Dumi Pg. Masdal	WARISAN
N63	Kunak	Norazlinah Arif	GRS (GAGASAN)
N64	Sulabayan	Jaujan Sambakong	WARISAN
N65	Senallang	Mohd. Shafie Apdal	WARISAN
N66	Bugaya	Jamil Hamzah from 19 November 2022	WARISAN
N66	Bugaya	Manis Muka Mohd Darah until 17 November 2020	WARISAN
N67	Balung	Hamid Awang	GRS (GAGASAN)
N68	Apas	Nizam Abu Bakar Titingan	GRS (GAGASAN)
N69	Sri Tanjong	Justin Wong Yung Bin	WARISAN
N70	Kukusan	Rina Jainal	GRS (PHRS)
N71	Tanjong Batu	Andi Muhammad Suryady Bandy	BN (UMNO)
N72	Merotai	Sarifuddin Hata	WARISAN
N73	Sebatik	Hassan A. Gani Pg. Amir	GRS (GAGASAN)
—	Nominated member	Raime Unggi	BN (UMNO)
—	Nominated member	Suhaimi Nasir	BN (UMNO)
—	Nominated member	Jaffari Walliam	GRS (GAGASAN)
—	Nominated member	Aliakbar Gulasan	PN (PAS)
—	Nominated member	Amisah Yassin	GRS (GAGASAN)
—	Nominated member	Yong Teck Lee	GRS (SAPP)

== Sarawak ==
=== 2016–2021 ===
18th Sarawak State Legislative Assembly
←	17th Assembly	19th Assembly	→

Overview
- Legislative body: Sarawak State Legislative Assembly
- Jurisdiction: Sarawak
- Meeting place: New Sarawak State Legislative Assembly Building
- Term: 7 June 2016 – 3 November 2021
- Election: 2016 state election
- Government: Cabinet of Sarawak
- Website: www.dun.sarawak.gov.my
- Members: 82
- Speaker: Mohamad Asfia Awang Nasar
- Deputy Speaker: Gerawat Gala
- Secretary: Semawi Mohamad
- Government Leader: Abang Abdul Rahman Zohari Abang Openg
- Opposition Leader: Wong Soon Koh
- Party control: Gabungan Parti Sarawak

Sovereign
- Yang di-Pertua Negeri: Abdul Taib Mahmud

Sessions
- 1st: 7 June 2016 – 3 November 2021

Following the state election that was held on 7 May 2016, Barisan Nasional was able to form the next state government with a majority of 72 seats out of 82. There were several candidates from breakaway parties such as TERAS and UPP that had their members contest seats under the Barisan banner as direct election candidates under a deal by Adenan Satem after their parties were prevented from joining Barisan after opposition from parties such as PDP and SUPP. On 12 June 2018, all Sarawak-based BN parties including Parti Pesaka Bumiputera Bersatu (PBB), Parti Rakyat Sarawak (PRS), Progressive Democratic Party (PDP) and Sarawak United People's Party (SUPP) officially left Barisan Nasional forming a new coalition Sarawak Parties Alliance due to Barisan Nasional's defeat in general elections on 9 May 2018.

No.	State Constituency	Member	Coalition (party)
GPS 67 | PSB 6 | PH 5 | PN 1 | IND 1 | VAC 2
N1	Opar	Ranum Mina (Note: Ranum Anak Mina contested the state election as a direct Barisan Nasional candidate, rejoin his previous party PSB on 11 August 2016.)	PSB
N2	Tasik Biru	Henry Harry Jinep	GPS (PDP)
N3	Tanjong Datu	Jamilah Anu (Note: Jamilah Anu was elected as a Barisan Nasional assemblyman on 18 February 2017 in a byelection following the death of assemblymen and Chief Minister Adenan Satem.)	GPS (PBB)
N4	Pantai Damai	Abdul Rahman Junaidi	GPS (PBB)
N5	Demak Laut	Hazland Abang Hipni	GPS (PBB)
N6	Tupong	Fazzrudin Abdul Rahman	GPS (PBB)
N7	Samariang	Sharifah Hasidah Sayeed Aman Ghazali	GPS (PBB)
N8	Satok	Abang Abdul Rahman Zohari Abang Openg	GPS (PBB)
N9	Padungan	Wong King Wei (Note: Wong King Wei contested the general election as a Pakatan Harapan DAP candidate, resigned from the party on July 27, 2020 and became and independent.)	IND
N10	Pending	Violet Yong Wui Wui	PH (DAP)
N11	Batu Lintang	See Chee How (Note: See Chee How contested the general election as a Pakatan Harapan (PKR) candidate, was sacked of his party membership on 14 April 2020, becoming an independent and later joining Sarawak United Party on 29 May 2020.)	PSB
N12	Kota Sentosa	Chong Chieng Jen	PH (DAP)
N13	Batu Kitang	Lo Khere Chiang	GPS (SUPP)
N14	Batu Kawah	Sim Kui Hian	GPS (SUPP)
N15	Asajaya	Abdul Karim Rahman Hamzah	GPS (PBB)
N16	Muara Tuang	Idris Buang	GPS (PBB)
N17	Stakan	Mohamad Ali Mahmud	GPS (PBB)
N18	Serembu	Miro Simuh (Note: Miro Simuh contested the state election as a direct Barisan Nasional candidate, joining PBB on 16 August 2016.)	GPS (PBB)
N19	Mambong	Jerip Susil (Note: Jerip Susil contested the state election as a direct Barisan Nasional candidate, rejoin his previous party PSB on 13 August 2016. However, he officially left PSB on 11 July 2019, and became an independent assemblyman pledging his full support to the state Chief Minister, while retaining his position in the state cabinet as an Assistant Minister. Over quarter years later, he unanimously joins PBB on 24 October 2019.)	GPS (PBB)
N20	Tarat	Roland Sagah Wee Inn	GPS (PBB)
N21	Tebedu	Michael Manyin Jawong	GPS (PBB)
N22	Kedup	Martin Ben	GPS (PBB)
N23	Bukit Semuja	John Ilus (Note: John Ilus contested the state election as a direct Barisan Nasional candidate, joining PBB on 16 August 2016.)	GPS (PBB)
N24	Sadong Jaya	Aidel Lariwoo	GPS (PBB)
N25	Simunjan	Awla Dris	GPS (PBB)
N26	Gedong	Mohd Naroden Majais	GPS (PBB)
N27	Sebuyau	Julaihi Narawi	GPS (PBB)
N28	Lingga	Simoi Peri	GPS (PBB)
N29	Beting Maro	Razaili Gapor	GPS (PBB)
N30	Balai Ringin	Snowdan Lawan	GPS (PRS)
N31	Bukit Begunan	Mong Dagang	GPS (PRS)
N32	Simanggang	Francis Harden Hollis	GPS (SUPP)
N33	Engkilili	Johnical Rayong Ngipa (Note: Johnical Rayong Ngipa contested the state election as a direct Barisan Nasional candidate, rejoin his previous party PSB on 12 August 2016.)	PSB
N34	Batang Ai	Malcom Mussen Lamoh	GPS (PRS)
N35	Saribas	Mohammad Razi Sitam	GPS (PBB)
N36	Layar	Gerald Rentap Jabu	GPS (PBB)
N37	Bukit Saban	Douglas Uggah Embas	GPS (PBB)
N38	Kalaka	Abdul Wahab Aziz	GPS (PBB)
N39	Krian	Ali Biju (Note: Ali Biju contested the general election as a Pakatan Harapan (PKR) candidate, quit his party membership on 24 February 2020. He later officially joined BERSATU on 11 March 2020)	PN (BERSATU)
N40	Kabong	Mohd Chee Kadir	GPS (PBB)
N41	Kuala Rajang	Len Talif Salleh	GPS (PBB)
N42	Semop	Abdullah Saidol	GPS (PBB)
N43	Daro	Safiee Ahmad	GPS (PBB)
N44	Jemoreng	Juanda Jaya	GPS (PBB)
N45	Repok	Huang Tiong Sii	GPS (SUPP)
N46	Meradong	Ding Kuong Hiing	GPS (SUPP)
N47	Pakan	William Mawan Ikom (Note: William Mawan Ikom contested the state election as a direct Barisan Nasional candidate, revealing on March 19, 2018 that he had joined PBB.)	GPS (PBB)
N48	Meluan	Rolland Duat Jubin	GPS (PDP)
N49	Ngemah	Alexander Vincent	GPS (PRS)
N50	Machan	Allan Siden Gramong	GPS (PBB)
N51	Bukit Assek	Irene Mary Chang Oi Ling	PH (DAP)
N52	Dudong	Tiong Thai King (Note: Tiong Thai King contested the state election as a direct Barisan Nasional candidate, rejoin his previous party PSB after the election.)	PSB
N53	Bawang Assan	Wong Soon Koh (Note: Wong Soon Koh contested the state election as a direct Barisan Nasional candidate, rejoin his previous party PSB after the election.)	PSB
N54	Pelawan	David Wong Kee Woan	PH (DAP)
N55	Nangka	Annuar Rapaee	GPS (PBB)
N56	Dalat	Fatimah Abdullah @ Ting Sai Ming	GPS (PBB)
N57	Tellian	Yussibnosh Balo	GPS (PBB)
N58	Balingian	Abdul Yakub Arbi	GPS (PBB)
N59	Tamin	Christopher Gira Sambang	GPS (PRS)
N60	Kakus	John Sikie Tayai	GPS (PRS)
N61	Pelagus	Wilson Nyabong Ijang	GPS (PRS)
N62	Katibas	Ambrose Blikau Enturan	GPS (PBB)
N63	Bukit Goram	Jefferson Jamit Unyat	GPS (PBB)
N64	Baleh	Vacant (Note: Its previous holder, James Jemut Masing from GPS (PRS), died in office on 31 October 2021. As he died close to Sarawak state election for 19th Assembly, a by-election was not expected to be held to fill the vacancy.)	
N64	Baleh	James Jemut Masing until 31 October 2021	GPS (PRS)
N65	Belaga	Liwan Lagang	GPS (PRS)
N66	Murum	Chukpai Ugon	GPS (PRS)
N67	Jepak	Talib Zulpilip	GPS (PBB)
N68	Tanjong Batu	Chiew Chiu Sing	PH (DAP)
N69	Kemena	Stephen Rundi Utom	GPS (PBB)
N70	Samalaju	Majang Renggi	GPS (PRS)
N71	Bekenu	Rosey Yunus (Note: Rosey Yunus contested the state election as a direct Barisan Nasional candidate, joining PBB on 16 August 2016.)	GPS (PBB)
N72	Lambir	Ripin Lamat	GPS (PBB)
N73	Piasau	Sebastian Ting Chiew Yew	GPS (SUPP)
N74	Pujut	Vacant (Note: Ting Tiong Choon who contested the state election as a DAP, PH candidate, was disqualified as an assemblyman by the Sarawak State Assembly due to his holding of dual Australian and Malaysian citizenship. A Federal Court upheld the ruling on 11 February 2020 after Ting tried to appeal the ruling. The Sarawak State assembly stated a by-election wasn't necessary as the date fell within two years of the dissolution of the state assembly in June 2021.)	
N74	Pujut	Ting Tiong Choon until 11 February 2020	PH (DAP)
N75	Senadin	Lee Kim Shin	GPS (SUPP)
N76	Marudi	Penguang Manggil	GPS (PDP)
N77	Telang Usan	Dennis Ngau	GPS (PBB)
N78	Mulu	Gerawat Gala (Note: Its previous holder, James Jemut Masing from GPS (PRS), died in office on 31 October 2021. As he died close to next state election, a by-election will not be held to fill the vacancy.)	GPS (PBB)
N79	Bukit Kota	Abdul Rahman Ismail	GPS (PBB)
N80	Batu Danau	Paulus Palu Gumbang (Note: Paulus Gumbang contested the state election as a direct Barisan Nasional candidate, joining PBB on 16 August 2016.)	GPS (PBB)
N81	Ba'kelalan	Baru Bian (Note: Baru Bian contested the general election as a Pakatan Harapan (PKR) candidate, quit his party membership on 24 February 2020, becoming an independent and later joining the Sarawak United Party on 29 May 2020.)	PSB
N82	Bukit Sari	Awang Tengah Ali Hasan	GPS (PBB)

=== 2021–2023 ===
19th Sarawak State Legislative Assembly
←	18th Assembly	20th Assembly	→

Overview
- Legislative body: Sarawak State Legislative Assembly
- Jurisdiction: Sarawak
- Meeting place: New Sarawak State Legislative Assembly Building
- Election: 2021 state election
- Government: Cabinet of Sarawak
- Website: www.dun.sarawak.gov.my
- Members: 82
- Speaker: Mohamad Asfia Awang Nasar
- Deputy Speaker: Idris Buang
- Secretary: Semawi Mohamad
- Government Leader: Abang Abdul Rahman Zohari Abang Openg
- Opposition Leader: Wong Soon Koh
- Party control: Gabungan Parti Sarawak

Sovereign
- Yang di-Pertua Negeri: Abdul Taib Mahmud

No.	State Constituency	Member	Coalition (party)
GPS 76 | PSB 3 | PH 2 | IND 1
N1	Opar	Billy Sujang	GPS (SUPP)
N2	Tasik Biru	Henry Harry Jinep	GPS (PDP)
N3	Tanjong Datu	Azizul Annuar Adenan	GPS (PBB)
N4	Pantai Damai	Abdul Rahman Junaidi	GPS (PBB)
N5	Demak Laut	Hazland Abang Hipni	GPS (PBB)
N6	Tupong	Fazzrudin Abdul Rahman	GPS (PBB)
N7	Samariang	Sharifah Hasidah Sayeed Aman Ghazali	GPS (PBB)
N8	Satok	Ibrahim Baki	GPS (PBB)
N9	Padungan	Chong Chieng Jen	PH (DAP)
N10	Pending	Violet Yong Wui Wui	PH (DAP)
N11	Batu Lintang	See Chee How (Note: See Chee How were elected in the 2021 elections on PSB ticket, but resigned from the party in 2022 and sits in the assembly as an independent since.)	IND
N12	Kota Sentosa	Wilfred Yap Yau Sin	GPS (SUPP)
N13	Batu Kitang	Lo Khere Chiang	GPS (SUPP)
N14	Batu Kawah	Sim Kui Hian	GPS (SUPP)
N15	Asajaya	Abdul Karim Rahman Hamzah	GPS (PBB)
N16	Muara Tuang	Idris Buang	GPS (PBB)
N17	Stakan	Hamzah Brahim	GPS (PBB)
N18	Serembu	Miro Simuh	GPS (PBB)
N19	Mambong	Jerip Susil	GPS (PBB)
N20	Tarat	Roland Sagah Wee Inn	GPS (PBB)
N21	Tebedu	Simon Sinang Bada	GPS (PBB)
N22	Kedup	Martin Ben	GPS (PBB)
N23	Bukit Semuja	John Ilus	GPS (PBB)
N24	Sadong Jaya	Aidel Lariwoo	GPS (PBB)
N25	Simunjan	Awla Dris	GPS (PBB)
N26	Gedong	Abang Abdul Rahman Zohari Abang Openg	GPS (PBB)
N27	Sebuyau	Julaihi Narawi	GPS (PBB)
N28	Lingga	Dayang Noorazah Awang Sohor	GPS (PBB)
N29	Beting Maro	Razaili Gapor	GPS (PBB)
N30	Balai Ringin	Snowdan Lawan	GPS (PRS)
N31	Bukit Begunan	Mong Dagang	GPS (PRS)
N32	Simanggang	Francis Harden Hollis	GPS (SUPP)
N33	Engkilili	Johnical Rayong Ngipa	PSB
N34	Batang Ai	Malcom Mussen Lamoh	GPS (PRS)
N35	Saribas	Mohammad Razi Sitam	GPS (PBB)
N36	Layar	Gerald Rentap Jabu	GPS (PBB)
N37	Bukit Saban	Douglas Uggah Embas	GPS (PBB)
N38	Kalaka	Mohamad Duri	GPS (PBB)
N39	Krian	Friday Belik	GPS (PDP)
N40	Kabong	Mohd Chee Kadir	GPS (PBB)
N41	Kuala Rajang	Len Talif Salleh	GPS (PBB)
N42	Semop	Abdullah Saidol	GPS (PBB)
N43	Daro	Safiee Ahmad	GPS (PBB)
N44	Jemoreng	Juanda Jaya	GPS (PBB)
N45	Repok	Huang Tiong Sii	GPS (SUPP)
N46	Meradong	Ding Kuong Hiing	GPS (SUPP)
N47	Pakan	William Mawan Ikom	GPS (PBB)
N48	Meluan	Rolland Duat Jubin	GPS (PDP)
N49	Ngemah	Anyi Jana	GPS (PRS)
N50	Machan	Allan Siden Gramong	GPS (PBB)
N51	Bukit Assek	Joseph Chieng Jin Ek	GPS (SUPP)
N52	Dudong	Tiong King Sing	GPS (PDP)
N53	Bawang Assan	Wong Soon Koh	PSB
N54	Pelawan	Michael Tiang Ming Tee	GPS (SUPP)
N55	Nangka	Annuar Rapaee	GPS (PBB)
N56	Dalat	Fatimah Abdullah @ Ting Sai Ming	GPS (PBB)
N57	Tellian	Royston Valentine	GPS (PBB)
N58	Balingian	Abdul Yakub Arbi	GPS (PBB)
N59	Tamin	Christopher Gira Sambang	GPS (PRS)
N60	Kakus	John Sikie Tayai	GPS (PRS)
N61	Pelagus	Wilson Nyabong Ijang	GPS (PRS)
N62	Katibas	Lidam Assan	GPS (PBB)
N63	Bukit Goram	Jefferson Jamit Unyat	GPS (PBB)
N64	Baleh	Nicholas Kudi Jantai Masing	GPS (PRS)
N65	Belaga	Liwan Lagang	GPS (PRS)
N66	Murum	Kennedy Chukpai Ugon	GPS (PRS)
N67	Jepak	Talib Zulpilip	GPS (PBB)
N68	Tanjong Batu	Johnny Pang Leong Ming	GPS (SUPP)
N69	Kemena	Stephen Rundi Utom	GPS (PBB)
N70	Samalaju	Majang Renggi	GPS (PRS)
N71	Bekenu	Rosey Yunus	GPS (PBB)
N72	Lambir	Ripin Lamat	GPS (PBB)
N73	Piasau	Sebastian Ting Chiew Yew	GPS (SUPP)
N74	Pujut	Adam Yii Siew Sang	GPS(SUPP)
N75	Senadin	Lee Kim Shin	GPS (SUPP)
N76	Marudi	Penguang Manggil	GPS (PDP)
N77	Telang Usan	Dennis Ngau	GPS (PBB)
N78	Mulu	Gerawat Gala	GPS (PBB)
N79	Bukit Kota	Abdul Rahman Ismail	GPS (PBB)
N80	Batu Danau	Paulus Palu Gumbang	GPS (PBB)
N81	Ba'kelalan	Baru Bian	PSB
N82	Bukit Sari	Awang Tengah Ali Hasan	GPS (PBB)

== See also ==
- Members of the Dewan Rakyat, 14th Malaysian Parliament
