= Leong Ngah Ngah =

Malaysian politician

Yang Berhormat Senator Dato' Leong Ngah Ngah DSAP
- 梁金福

Senator Appointed by the Yang di-Pertuan Agong
- Incumbent
- Assumed office 25 August 2025
- Monarch: Ibrahim
- Prime Minister: Anwar Ibrahim

State Advisor of the Democratic Action Party of Pahang
- Incumbent
- Assumed office 1 September 2024
- Secretary-General: Anthony Loke Siew Fook
- State Chairman: Lee Chin Chen
- Preceded by: Position established

State Chairman of the Democratic Action Party of Pahang
- In office 25 October 2015 – 1 September 2024
- Secretary-General: Lim Guan Eng (2015–2022); Anthony Loke Siew Fook (2022–2024)
- Preceded by: Tengku Zulpuri Shah Raja Puji
- Succeeded by: Lee Chin Chen

Member of the Pahang State Legislative Assembly for Tanah Rata
- In office 5 May 2013 – 9 May 2018
- Preceded by: Ho Yip Kap (BN–GERAKAN)
- Succeeded by: Chiong Yoke Kong (PH–DAP)
- Majority: 3,144 (2013)

Member of the Pahang State Legislative Assembly for Teriang
- In office 21 October 1990 – 5 May 2013
- Preceded by: Mok San Hong (BN–MCA)
- Succeeded by: Leong Yu Man (PR–DAP)
- Majority: 250 (1990) (1995); 2,950 (1999); 605 (2004); 2,469 (2008)

Personal details
- Born: Leong Ngah Ngah; 21 October 1955 (age 70) Triang, Pahang, Federation of Malaya (now Malaysia)
- Citizenship: Malaysian
- Party: Democratic Action Party (DAP) (since 1978)
- Other political affiliations: Gagasan Rakyat (GR) (1990–1996); Barisan Alternatif (BA) (1999–2004); Pakatan Rakyat (PR) (2008–2015); Pakatan Harapan (PH) (since 2015)
- Children: Leong Yu Man (daughter)
- Occupation: Politician

Leong Ngah Ngah

Chinese name
- Traditional Chinese: 梁金福
- Simplified Chinese: 梁金福
Transcriptions
Standard Mandarin
- Hanyu Pinyin: Liáng Jīnfú

Leong Ngah Ngah (Chinese: 梁金福; pinyin: Liáng Jīnfú; born 21 October 1955) is a Malaysian politician who has served as a Senator since August 2025. He served as Member of the Pahang State Legislative Assembly (MLA) for Teriang from October 1990 to May 2013 and Tanah Rata from May 2013 to May 2018. He is a member of the Democratic Action Party (DAP), a component party of the Pakatan Harapan (PH) and formerly Pakatan Rakyat (PR), Barisan Alternatif (BA) and Gagasan Rakyat (GR) coalitions. He has also served as the State Advisor of DAP of Pahang since September 2024. He served as the State Chairman of DAP of Pahang for two times until his defeat by a minority of one vote where he was replaced with Tengku Zulpuri Shah Raja Puji in the 2013 Pahang DAP congress and state committee election and again from October 2015 to September 2024. He is also the father of Leong Yu Man, Member of the Pahang State Executive Council (EXCO) and Triang MLA.

== Election results ==
Pahang State Legislative Assembly
Year	Constituency	Candidate	Votes	Pct	Opponent(s)	Votes	Pct	Ballots cast	Majority	Turnout
1990	N29 Teriang	Leong Ngah Ngah (DAP)	5,360	51.19%	Mok San Hong (MCA)	5,110	48.81%	10,816	250	78.46%
1995	N33 Teriang	Leong Ngah Ngah (DAP)								
1999	N33 Teriang	Leong Ngah Ngah (DAP)	6,078	66.02%	Tan Ah Bee (Gerakan)	3,128	33.98%	9,451	2,950	73.54%
2004	N38 Triang	Leong Ngah Ngah (DAP)	5,845	52.73%	Tan Ah Bee (Gerakan)	5,240	47.27%	11,382	605	74.01%
2008	N38 Triang	Leong Ngah Ngah (DAP)	7,121	60.49%	Tan Tin Loon (Gerakan)	4,652	39.51%	12,047	2,469	76.04%
2013	N01 Tanah Rata	Leong Ngah Ngah (DAP)	7,878	60.51%	Ho Yip Kap (Gerakan)	4,734	36.36%	13,353	3,144	79.50%
2013	N01 Tanah Rata	Leong Ngah Ngah (DAP)	7,878	60.51%	Cheam May Choo (IND)	408	3.13%	13,353	3,144	79.50%

== Honours ==
- Pahang
  - Knight Companion of the Order of Sultan Ahmad Shah of Pahang (DSAP) – Dato' (2021)
