= Tanah Rata (state constituency) =

Political subdivision in Malaysia

Tanah Rata (N01)
Pahang constituency

State constituency
- Legislature: Pahang State Legislative Assembly
MLA
Ho Chi Yang
PH
- Constituency created: 1974
- First contested: 1974
- Last contested: 2022

Demographics
- Electors (2022): 26,838

Tanah Rata is a state constituency in Pahang, Malaysia, that is represented in the Pahang State Legislative Assembly.

== Demographics ==
Ethnic breakdown of Tanah Rata's electorate as of 2022
1. Chinese (46.0%)
2. Indian (20.1%)
3. Other ethnicities (18.8%)
4. Malay (15.2%)

== History ==
=== Polling districts ===
According to the gazette issued on 31 October 2022, the Tanah Rata constituency has a total of 17 polling districts.

| State constituency | Polling Districts | Code | Location |
|---|---|---|---|
| Tanah Rata（N01） | Pos Terisu | 078/01/01 | SK Terisu |
| Tanah Rata（N01） | Pos Telanuk | 078/01/02 | SK Telanuk |
| Tanah Rata（N01） | Pos Lemoi | 078/01/03 | SK Lemoi |
| Tanah Rata（N01） | Pos Mensun | 078/01/04 | SK Menson |
| Tanah Rata（N01） | Lembah Bertam | 078/01/05 | SJK (C) Bertam Valley |
| Tanah Rata（N01） | Bandar Ringlet | 078/01/06 | SJK (T) Ringlet |
| Tanah Rata（N01） | Habu | 078/01/07 | SMK Ringlet |
| Tanah Rata（N01） | Ladang Boh 1 | 078/01/08 | SJK (T) Ladang Boh 1 |
| Tanah Rata（N01） | Ladang Boh 2 | 078/01/09 | SJK (T) Ladang Boh 2 |
| Tanah Rata（N01） | Kea Farm | 078/01/10 | SJK (C) Kea Farm |
| Tanah Rata（N01） | Tanah Rata | 078/01/11 | SMK Sultan Ahmad Shah |
| Tanah Rata（N01） | Berinchang | 078/01/12 | SJK (C) Brinchang |
| Tanah Rata（N01） | Ladang Sungai Palas | 078/01/13 | SJK (T) Ladang Sungai Palas |
| Tanah Rata（N01） | Ladang Blue Valley | 078/01/14 | SJK (T) Ladang Blue Valley |
| Tanah Rata（N01） | Kampung Raja | 078/01/15 | SK Kampung Raja |
| Tanah Rata（N01） | Kuala Terla | 078/01/16 | SJK (C) Kuala Terla |
| Tanah Rata（N01） | Teringkap | 078/01/17 | SJK (C) Tringkap |

=== Representation history ===
Members of the Legislative Assembly for Tanah Rata
| Assembly | No | Years | Name | Party |
Constituency created from Cameron Highlands
| 4th | N02 | 1974-1978 | Wong Lok Hoi (王禄海) | BN (GERAKAN) |
| 5th | N02 | 1978-1982 | Sangaralingam Muthu Muthaya | BN (MIC) |
| 6th | N02 | 1982-1986 | Sangaralingam Muthu Muthaya | BN (MIC) |
| 7th | N01 | 1986-1990 | Chan Kong Choy (陈广才) | BN (MCA) |
| 8th | N01 | 1990-1995 | Law Kee Long (刘其梁) | BN (MCA) |
Constituency abolished, split into Cameron Highlands and Jelai
Constituency recreated from Cameron Highlands and Jelai
| 11th | N01 | 2004-2008 | Choong Ching Yan (钟正彥) | BN (MCA) |
| 12th | N01 | 2008-2010 | Ho Yip Kap (何业嘉/何业加) | IND |
| 12th | N01 | 2010-2013 | Ho Yip Kap (何业嘉/何业加) | BN (GERAKAN) |
| 13th | N01 | 2013-2015 | Leong Ngah Ngah (梁金福) | PR (DAP) |
| 13th | N01 | 2015-2018 | Leong Ngah Ngah (梁金福) | PH (DAP) |
| 14th | N01 | 2018-2022 | Chiong Yoke Kong (张玉刚) | PH (DAP) |
| 15th | N01 | 2022–present | Ho Chi Yang (何子扬) | PH (DAP) |

== Election results ==
Pahang state election, 2022
| Party | Candidate | Votes | % | ∆% |
|---|---|---|---|---|
| PH | Ho Chi Yang | 9,856 | 53.04 | ▲53.04 |
| BN | Wong Yap Wah | 7,372 | 39.67 | ▲3.96 |
| PN | Lai Chii Wen | 1,353 | 7.28 | ▲7.28 |
| Total valid votes | | 18,581 | 100.00 | |
| Total rejected ballots | | 438 | | |
| Unreturned ballots | | 33 | | |
| Turnout | | 19,052 | 70.99 | ▼6.00 |
| Registered electors | | 26,838 | | |
| Majority | | 2,484 | 13.37 | ▼11.12 |
| PH hold | | Swing | | |

Pahang state election, 2018
| Party | Candidate | Votes | % | ∆% |
|---|---|---|---|---|
| PKR | Chiong Yoke Kong | 8,821 | 60.20 | ▲60.20 |
| BN | Leong Tak Man | 5,232 | 35.71 | ▼0.65 |
| PAS | Kumar Silambaram | 600 | 4.09 | ▲4.09 |
| Total valid votes | | 14,653 | 100.00 | |
| Total rejected ballots | | 305 | | |
| Unreturned ballots | | 59 | | |
| Turnout | | 15,017 | 76.99 | ▼2.57 |
| Registered electors | | 19,505 | | |
| Majority | | 3,589 | 24.49 | ▲0.35 |
| PKR hold | | Swing | | |
Source(s) "Pahang - 14th General Election Malaysia (GE14 / PRU14)". The Star.

Pahang state election, 2013
| Party | Candidate | Votes | % | ∆% |
|---|---|---|---|---|
| DAP | Leong Ngah Ngah | 7,878 | 60.51 | ▲38.59 |
| BN | Ho Yip Kap | 4,734 | 36.36 | ▲0.41 |
| Independent | Cheam May Choo | 408 | 3.13 | ▼38.99 |
| Total valid votes | | 13,020 | 100.00 | |
| Total rejected ballots | | 340 | | |
| Unreturned ballots | | 3 | | |
| Turnout | | 13,363 | 79.56 | ▲12.42 |
| Registered electors | | 16,796 | | |
| Majority | | 3,144 | 24.15 | ▲17.98 |
| DAP gain from Independent | | Swing | | - |

Pahang state election, 2008
| Party | Candidate | Votes | % | ∆% |
|---|---|---|---|---|
| Independent | Ho Yip Kap | 3,926 | 42.12 | ▲42.12 |
| BN | Chai Kok Lim | 3,351 | 35.95 | ▼37.05 |
| DAP | Go Mong Nging | 2,043 | 21.92 | ▼5.07 |
| Total valid votes | | 9,320 | 100.00 | |
| Total rejected ballots | | 409 | | |
| Unreturned ballots | | 53 | | |
| Turnout | | 9,782 | 67.14 | ▲5.13 |
| Registered electors | | 14,569 | | |
| Majority | | 575 | 6.17 | ▼39.84 |
| Independent gain from BN | | Swing | | - |

Pahang state election, 2004
| Party | Candidate | Votes | % | ∆% |
|---|---|---|---|---|
| BN | Choong Chin Yan | 6,193 | 73.00 | ▲18.36 |
| DAP | Go Mong Nging | 2,290 | 27.00 | ▼1.88 |
| Total valid votes | | 8,483 | 100.00 | |
| Total rejected ballots | | 330 | | |
| Unreturned ballots | | 0 | | |
| Turnout | | 8,813 | 62.02 | |
| Registered electors | | 14,211 | | |
| Majority | | 3,903 | 46.01 | |
| BN hold | | Swing | | |

Pahang state election, 1986
| Party | Candidate | Votes | % | ∆% |
|---|---|---|---|---|
| BN | Chan Kong Choy | 4,006 | 54.64 | ▲54.64 |
| DAP | Poon Man Kem | 2,117 | 28.88 | ▼19.43 |
| Independent | Aleyakanvenden Perian | 890 | 12.14 | ▲9.29 |
| Independent | Mazlan Md Taib | 318 | 4.34 | ▲1.49 |
| Total valid votes | | 7,331 | 100.00 | |
| Total rejected ballots | | 340 | | |
| Unreturned ballots | | 0 | | |
| Turnout | | 7,671 | 63.22 | ▼6.11 |
| Registered electors | | 12,134 | | |
| Majority | | 1,889 | 25.77 | ▲25.23 |
| BN hold | | Swing | | |

Pahang state election, 1982
| Party | Candidate | Votes | % | ∆% |
|---|---|---|---|---|
| BN | Sangaralingam Muthu | 3,432 | 48.85 | ▲10.00 |
| DAP | Poon Man Kem | 3,394 | 48.31 | ▲37.21 |
| Independent | Chay Ee Mong | 200 | 2.85 | ▼18.01 |
| Total valid votes | | 7,026 | 100.00 | |
| Total rejected ballots | | 275 | | |
| Unreturned ballots | | 0 | | |
| Turnout | | 7,301 | 69.33 | ▼6.27 |
| Registered electors | | 10,531 | | |
| Majority | | 38 | 0.54 | ▼9.11 |
| BN hold | | Swing | | |

Pahang state election, 1978
| Party | Candidate | Votes | % |
|---|---|---|---|
| BN | Sangaralingam Muthu | 2,384 | 38.85 |
| Independent | Tan Choon Chuan | 1,792 | 29.20 |
| Independent | Wong Lok Hoi | 1,280 | 20.86 |
| DAP | Nadarajan | 681 | 11.10 |
| Total valid votes | | 6,137 | 100.00 |
| Total rejected ballots | | 291 | |
| Unreturned ballots | | 0 | |
| Turnout | | 6,428 | 75.60 |
| Registered electors | | 8,503 | |
| Majority | | 592 | 9.65 |
| BN hold | | Swing | |

Pahang state election, 1974
| Party | Candidate | Votes |
|---|---|---|
On the nomination day,Wong Lok Hoi won uncontested.
| BN | Wong Lok Hoi | |
| Total valid votes | | |
| Total rejected ballots | | |
| Unreturned ballots | | |
| Turnout | | |
| Registered electors | | 6,596 |
| Majority | | |
This was a new constituency created.
