= Chiong Yoke Kong =

Malaysian politician

- 张玉刚

Political Secretary to the Minister of Housing and Local Government
- In office 2022 – 17 February 2024
- Monarch: Ibrahim Iskandar
- Prime Minister: Anwar Ibrahim
- Minister: Nga Kor Ming
- Succeeded by: Steven Chaw Kam Foon

Deputy Youth Chief of the Democratic Action Party
- In office 2 December 2018 – 19 March 2022
- Secretary-General: Lim Guan Eng
- Youth Chief: Howard Lee Chuan How
- Preceded by: Wong King Wei
- Succeeded by: Young Syefura Othman

Member of the Pahang State Legislative Assembly for Tanah Rata
- In office 9 May 2018 – 19 November 2022
- Preceded by: Leong Ngah Ngah (PR–DAP)
- Succeeded by: Ho Chi Yang (PH–DAP)
- Majority: 3,589 (2018)

Personal details
- Born: Chiong Yoke Kong; 28 February 1983 (age 43) Kuala Lumpur, Malaysia
- Citizenship: Malaysian
- Party: Democratic Action Party (DAP)
- Other political affiliations: Pakatan Rakyat (PR) (2008–2015); Pakatan Harapan (PH) (since 2015)
- Education: University of Malaya (BSc)
- Occupation: Businessman, Politician

Chiong Yoke Kong

Chinese name
- Traditional Chinese: 張玉剛
- Simplified Chinese: 张玉刚
Transcriptions
Standard Mandarin
- Hanyu Pinyin: Zhāng Yùgāng

Chiong Yoke Kong (simplified Chinese: 张玉刚; traditional Chinese: 張玉剛; pinyin: Zhāng Yùgāng; born 28 February 1983) is a Malaysian politician who served as the Political Secretary to the Minister of Housing and Local Government Nga Kor Ming from 2022 to February 2024. He served as the Member of the Pahang State Legislative Assembly (MLA) for Tanah Rata from May 2018 to November 2022. He is a Democratic Action Party (DAP), a component party of the Pakatan Harapan (PH) and formerly Pakatan Rakyat (PR) coalitions. He served as the Deputy Youth Chief of DAP or the Deputy Chief of the DAP Socialist Youth (DAPSY) from December 2018 to March 2022.

== Election results ==
Pahang State Legislative Assembly
Year	Constituency	Candidate	Votes	Pct	Opponent(s)	Votes	Pct	Ballots cast	Majority	Turnout
2018	N01 Tanah Rata	Chiong Yoke Kong (DAP)	8,821	60.20%	Leong Tak Man (MCA)	5,232	35.71%	15,017	3,589	76.99%
2018	N01 Tanah Rata	Chiong Yoke Kong (DAP)	8,821	60.20%	Kumar Silambaram (PAS)	600	4.09%	15,017	3,589	76.99%

Parliament of Malaysia
Year	Constituency	Candidate	Votes	Pct	Opponent(s)	Votes	Pct	Ballots cast	Majority	Turnout
2022	P078 Cameron Highlands	Chiong Yoke Kong (DAP)	11,576	34.80%	Ramli Mohd Nor (UMNO)	16,120	48.46%	33,265	4,544	72.28%
2022	P078 Cameron Highlands	Chiong Yoke Kong (DAP)	11,576	34.80%	Abdul Rasid Mohamed Ali (BERSATU)	5,569	16.74%	33,265	4,544	72.28%
