= Leong Yu Man =

Malaysian politician and former nutritionist

Yang Berhormat Puan Leong Yu Man MLA
- 梁耀雯

Member of the Pahang State Executive Council
- Incumbent
- Assumed office 2 December 2022
- Monarch: Abdullah
- Menteri Besar: Wan Rosdy Wan Ismail
- Portfolio: Unity, Tourism & Culture (Note: Assumed portfolios on 14 December 2022 after taking office)
- Preceded by: Shahaniza Shamsuddin (Unity & Culture); Mohd Sharkar Shamsudin (Tourism)
- Constituency: Triang

Member of the Pahang State Legislative Assembly for Triang
- Incumbent
- Assumed office 5 May 2013
- Preceded by: Leong Ngah Ngah (PR–DAP)
- Majority: 5,009 (2013); 6,454 (2018); 6,219 (2023)

Personal details
- Born: Leong Yu Man; 22 June 1985 (age 40) Triang, Pahang, Malaysia
- Citizenship: Malaysian
- Party: Democratic Action Party (DAP)
- Other political affiliations: Pakatan Rakyat (PR) (2008–2015); Pakatan Harapan (PH) (since 2015)
- Parent: Leong Ngah Ngah (father)
- Education: Triang Chinese National Type School 1 (1992–1997); Triang National Secondary School (1998–2002); Temerloh National Secondary School (2003–2004)
- Alma mater: University of Putra Malaysia (Bachelor of Science in nutrition and community health)
- Occupation: Politician
- Profession: Nutritionist (2009–2013)

Leong Yu Man

Chinese name
- Traditional Chinese: 梁耀雯
- Simplified Chinese: 梁耀雯
Transcriptions
Standard Mandarin
- Hanyu Pinyin: Liáng Yàowén

Leong Yu Man (Chinese: 梁耀雯; pinyin: Liáng Yàowén; born 22 June 1985) is a Malaysian politician and former nutritionist who has served as Member of the Pahang State Executive Council (EXCO) in the Barisan Nasional (BN) state administration under Menteri Besar Wan Rosdy Wan Ismail since December 2022 and Member of the Pahang State Legislative Assembly (MLA) for Triang since May 2013. She is a member, State Organising Secretary of Pahang and Division Women Chief of Bera of the Democratic Action Party (DAP), a component party of the Pakatan Harapan (PH) and formerly Pakatan Rakyat (PR) coalitions. She is the youngest, the only female and the only Pahang EXCO Member of DAP and one of the only two Pahang EXCO Members of PH and Chinese ethnicity alongside Teruntum MLA Sim Chon Siang. She is also the daughter of Senator, State Advisor of DAP of Pahang, former Triang MLA and former State Chairman of DAP of Pahang Leong Ngah Ngah. She created history as the first ever female Chinese and DAP Pahang EXCO Member.

== Political career ==
=== Member of the Pahang State Executive Council (since 2022) ===
The 2022 Pahang state election elected a hung Pahang State Legislative Assembly for the first time in the history of the state. Jelai MLA Wan Rosdy of BN was reappointed as the Menteri Besar after BN and PH formed a coalition state government on 28 November 2022. On 2 December 2022, Leong was appointed as Pahang EXCO Member by Menteri Besar Wan Rosdy. 12 days later on 14 December 2022, Leong assumed the portfolios of Unity, Tourism and Culture, taking over the former two portfolios from former Kuala Sentul MLA Shahaniza Shamsuddin and the latter one portfolio from former Lanchang MLA Mohd Sharkar Shamsudin.

=== Member of the Pahang State Legislative Assembly (since 2013) ===
==== 2013 Pahang state election ====
In the 2013 Pahang state election, Leong made her electoral debut after being nominated by PR to contest for the Triang seat, held by her father Leong Ngah Ngah since 1990. She won the seat and was elected to the Pahang State Legislative Assembly as the Triang MLA for the first term, taking over her father after defeating Tan Tin Loon of BN by a majority of 5,009 votes.

==== 2018 Pahang state election ====
In the 2018 Pahang state election, Leong was renominated by PH to defend the Triang seat. She defended the seat and was reelected to the Pahang Assembly as the Triang MLA for the second term after defeating Tan of BN in a rematch by a majority of 6,454 votes.

==== 2022 Pahang state election ====
In the 2022 Pahang state election, Leong was renominated by PH to defend the Triang seat and was reelected to the Pahang Assembly as the Triang MLA for the third term. Leong defended the seat after defeating Yee Cheng Hwa of BN and Izzuddin Zulkifli of Perikatan Nasional (PN) by a majority of 6,219 votes.

== Election results ==
Pahang State Legislative Assembly
| Year | Constituency | Candidate | Votes | Pct | Opponent(s) | Votes | Pct | Ballots cast | Majority | Turnout |
|---|---|---|---|---|---|---|---|---|---|---|
| 2013 | N38 Triang | Leong Yu Man (DAP) | 10,076 | 66.54% | Tan Tin Loon (Gerakan) | 5,067 | 33.46% | 15,385 | 5,009 | 83.04% |
| 2018 | N38 Triang | Leong Yu Man (DAP) | 11,222 | 70.18% | Tan Tin Loon (Gerakan) | 4,768 | 29.82% | 16,414 | 6,454 | 81.73% |
| 2022 | N38 Triang | Leong Yu Man (DAP) | 10,816 | 57.02% | Yee Cheng Hwa (MCA) | 4,597 | 24.23% | 18,970 | 6,219 | 73.27% |
| 2022 | N38 Triang | Leong Yu Man (DAP) | 10,816 | 57.02% | Izzuddin Zulkifli (BERSATU) | 3,557 | 18.75% | 18,970 | 6,219 | 73.27% |
