= Buluh Gading =

Political subdivision in Malaysia

Buluh Gading (N10)
Terengganu constituency

State constituency
- Legislature: Terengganu State Legislative Assembly
MLA
Ridzuan Hashim
PN
- Constituency created: 2018
- First contested: 2018
- Last contested: 2023

Demographics
- Electors (2023): 27,845

N10 Buluh Gading within Terengganu, as used for the 2023 state election

Buluh Gading is a state constituency in Terengganu, Malaysia, that has been represented in the Terengganu State Legislative Assembly.

The state constituency was first contested in 2018 and is mandated to return a single Assemblyman to the Terengganu State Legislative Assembly under the first-past-the-post voting system.

== Demographics ==
Ethnic breakdown of Buluh Gading's electorate as of 2018
1. Malay (98.3%)
2. Chinese (1.52%)
3. Other ethnicities (0.14%)
4. Indian (0.04%)

== History ==
=== Polling districts ===
According to the Gazette issued on 30 March 2018, the Buluh Gading constituency has a total of 10 polling districts.

State Constituency	Polling Districts	Code	Location
Buluh Gading (N10)	Bukit Petiti	035/10/01	SK Bukit Petiti
Buluh Gading (N10)	Banggul Peradung	035/10/02	SK Banggol Peradong
Buluh Gading (N10)	Kebur Besar	035/10/03	SK Kabor Besar
Buluh Gading (N10)	Kebur Air	035/10/04	SK Kebor Ayer
Buluh Gading (N10)	Jeram	035/10/05	SMK Dato' Haji Mohd Said
Buluh Gading (N10)	Petai Bubus	035/10/06	SK Kampong Tengah; Kompleks Usahawan Terengganu
Buluh Gading (N10)	Teluk Pusu	035/10/07	SMK Haji Abdul Rahman Limbong
Buluh Gading (N10)	Tanjung Bunut	035/10/08	SK Telok Pusu
Buluh Gading (N10)	Kesum	035/10/09	SK Kesom
Buluh Gading (N10)	Buluh Gading	035/10/10	Dewan Sivik Buluh Gading

=== Representation history ===
Members of the Legislative Assembly for Buloh Gading
Assembly	No	Years	Member	Party
Constituency created from Teluk Pasu and Manir
14th	N10	2018–2020	Ridzuan Hashim	PAS
14th	N10	2020–2023	Ridzuan Hashim	PN (PAS)
15th	N10	2023–present	Ridzuan Hashim	PN (PAS)

== Election results ==
Terengganu state election, 2023: Buluh Gading
Party	Candidate	Votes	%	∆%
PAS	Ridzuan Hashim	16,213	73.50	▲14.08
BN	Omar Adam	5,847	26.50	▼9.49
Total valid votes		22,060	100.00	
Total rejected ballots		129		
Unreturned ballots		14		
Turnout		22,202	79.73	
Registered electors		27,845		
Majority		10,366	47.00	▲23.57
PAS hold		Swing		

Terengganu state election, 2018: Buluh Gading
Party	Candidate	Votes	%
PAS	Ridzuan Hashim	11,580	59.42
BN	Che Mansor Salleh	7,013	35.99
PKR	Azik Chik	894	4.59
Total valid votes		19,487	100.00
Total rejected ballots		286	
Unreturned ballots		74	
Turnout		19,847	88.10
Registered electors		22,528	
Majority		4,567	23.44
This was a new constituency created.
