= Ho Chi Yang =

Malaysian politician

Yang Berhormat Tuan Ho Chi Yang MLA
- 何子扬

Member of the Pahang State Legislative Assembly for Tanah Rata
- Incumbent
- Assumed office 19 November 2022
- Preceded by: Chiong Yoke Kong (PH–DAP)
- Majority: 2,484 (2022)

Youth Publicity Secretary of the Democratic Action Party
- Incumbent
- Assumed office 17 November 2024
- Secretary-General: Anthony Loke Siew Fook
- Youth Chief: Woo Kah Leong
- Assistant: Pang Sock Tao; Nursyaheera Abdul Ghafar
- Preceded by: Woo Kah Leong

State Youth Chief of the Democratic Action Party of Pahang
- Incumbent
- Assumed office 6 October 2024
- Secretary-General: Anthony Loke Siew Fook
- State Chairman: Lee Chin Chen

Youth Director of the Varsity Affairs of the Democratic Action Party
- In office 19 March 2022 – 17 November 2024
- Secretary-General: Lim Guan Eng (19–20 March 2022); Anthony Loke Siew Fook (2022–2024)
- Youth Chief: Kelvin Yii Lee Wuen
- Preceded by: Leong Yu Sheng
- Succeeded by: Koh Ling Xian

Personal details
- Born: Ho Chi Yang; 3 August 1995 (age 31) Perak, Malaysia
- Citizenship: Malaysian
- Party: Democratic Action Party (DAP)
- Other political affiliations: Pakatan Harapan (PH)
- Occupation: Politician

Ho Chi Yang

Chinese name
- Traditional Chinese: 何子揚
- Simplified Chinese: 何子扬
Transcriptions
Standard Mandarin
- Hanyu Pinyin: Hé Zǐyáng

Ho Chi Yang (simplified Chinese: 何子扬; traditional Chinese: 何子揚; pinyin: Hé Zǐyáng; born 3 August 1995) is a Malaysian politician who has served as Member of the Pahang State Legislative Assembly (MLA) for Tanah Rata since November 2022. He is a member of the Democratic Action Party (DAP), a component party of the Pakatan Harapan (PH) coalition. He has served as the Youth Publicity Secretary of DAP since November 2024 and the State Youth Chief of DAP of Pahang since October 2024. He served as the Youth Director of the Varsity Affairs of DAP from March 2022 to his promotion to the Youth Publicity Secretary in November 2024. He is presently the youngest elected representative of DAP at the age of 31 years, 74 days.

== Member of the Pahang State Legislative Assembly (since 2022) ==
In the 2022 Pahang state election, Ho made his electoral debut after being nominated by PH to contest for the Tanah Rata state seat. Ho won the seat and was elected to the Pahang State Legislative Assembly as the Tanah Rata MLA after defeating Wong Yap Wah of Barisan Nasional (BN) and Lai Chii Wen of Perikatan Nasional (PN) by a majority of 2,484 votes.

== Election results ==
Pahang State Legislative Assembly
Year	Constituency	Candidate	Votes	Pct	Opponent(s)	Votes	Pct	Ballots cast	Majority	Turnout
2022	N01 Tanah Rata	Ho Chi Yang (DAP)	9,856	53.04%	Wong Yap Wah (MCA)	7,372	39.67%	18,581	2,484	70.99%
2022	N01 Tanah Rata	Ho Chi Yang (DAP)	9,856	53.04%	Lai Chii Wen (Gerakan)	1,353	7.28%	18,581	2,484	70.99%
