= Triang (state constituency) =

Political subdivision in Malaysia

Coordinates: 3.24°N 102.39°E

Triang (N38)
Pahang constituency

State constituency
- Legislature: Pahang State Legislative Assembly
MLA
Leong Yu Man
PH
- Constituency created: 1959
- First contested: 1959
- Last contested: 2022

Demographics
- Population (2020): 42,362
- Electors (2022): 25,891

Triang is a state constituency in Pahang, Malaysia, that is represented in the Pahang State Legislative Assembly.

== Demographics ==
Ethnic breakdown of Triang's electorate as of 2022
1. Chinese (62.7%)
2. Malay (30.9%)
3. Indian (4.77%)
4. Other ethnicities (1.64%)

== History ==
=== Polling districts ===
According to the federal gazette issued on 31 October 2022, the Triang constituency is divided into 9 polling districts.

State constituency	Polling district	Code	Location
Triang（N38）	Ladang Menteri	090/38/01	SJK (C) Ladang Menteri
Triang（N38）	Kerayong	090/38/02	SMK Bandar Kerayong
Triang（N38）	Taman Sentosa	090/38/03	SJK (C) Triang 2
Triang（N38）	Bandar Triang	090/38/04	SMJK Triang
Triang（N38）	Kampung Baru Triang	090/38/05	SJK (C) Triang 1
Triang（N38）	Sri Buntar	090/38/06	SK Sri Buntar
Triang（N38）	Mengkuang	090/38/07	SJK (C) Mengkuang
Triang（N38）	FELDA Bukit Puchong	090/38/08	SK LKTP Bukit Puchong
Triang（N38）	FELDA Bukit Mendi	090/39/09	SK LKTP Bukit Mendi

=== Representation history ===
Members of the Legislative Assembly for Triang
Assembly	No	Years	Name	Party
Constituency created
Triang
1st	N17	1959-1964	Lum Wah Kum @ Lum Ban Kee (林華錦)	Alliance (MCA)
2nd	N17	1964-1969	Lum Wah Kum @ Lum Ban Kee (林華錦)	Alliance (MCA)
		1969-1971	Assembly dissolved	
3rd	N17	1971-1973	Lum Wah Kum @ Lum Ban Kee (林华绵)	Alliance (MCA)
3rd	N17	1973-1974	Lum Wah Kum @ Lum Ban Kee (林华绵)	BN (MCA)
4th	N32	1974-1978	Ngau Boon Min (饶文明)	BN (MCA)
5th	N32	1978-1982	Ngau Boon Min (饶文明)	BN (MCA)
6th	N32	1982-1986	Lim Ong Hang (林运亨)	DAP
Teriang
7th	N29	1986-1990	Mok San Hong (莫善鸿)	BN (MCA)
8th	N29	1990-1995	Leong Ngah Ngah (梁金福)	GR (DAP)
9th	N33	1995-1999	Leong Ngah Ngah (梁金福)	GR (DAP)
10th	N33	1999-2004	Leong Ngah Ngah (梁金福)	BA (DAP)
Triang
11th	N38	2004-2008	Leong Ngah Ngah (梁金福)	DAP
12th	N38	2008-2013	Leong Ngah Ngah (梁金福)	PR (DAP)
13th	N38	2013-2015	Leong Yu Man (梁耀雯)	PR (DAP)
13th	N38	2015-2018	Leong Yu Man (梁耀雯)	PH (DAP)
14th	N38	2018-2022	Leong Yu Man (梁耀雯)	PH (DAP)
15th	N38	2022–present	Leong Yu Man (梁耀雯)	PH (DAP)

== Election results ==
Pahang state election, 2022
Party	Candidate	Votes	%	∆%
PH	Leong Yu Man	10,816	57.02	▲57.02
BN	Yee Cheng Hwa	4,957	24.23	▼5.59
PN	Muhammad Izzuddin Zulkifli	3,557	18.75	▲18.75
Total valid votes		18,970	100.00	
Total rejected ballots		237		
Unreturned ballots		11		
Turnout		19,218	74.23	▼7.50
Registered electors		25,891		
Majority		6,219	32.78	▼7.58
PH hold		Swing		

Pahang state election, 2018
Party	Candidate	Votes	%	∆%
PKR	Leong Yu Man	11,222	70.18	▲3.64
BN	Tan Tin Loon	4,768	29.82	▼3.64
Total valid votes		15,990	100.00	
Total rejected ballots		369		
Unreturned ballots		55		
Turnout		16,414	81.73	▼1.49
Registered electors		20,083		
Majority		6,454	40.36	▲7.28
PKR hold		Swing		

Pahang state election, 2013
Party	Candidate	Votes	%	∆%
DAP	Leong Yu Man	10,076	66.54	▲6.05
BN	Tan Tin Loon	5,067	33.46	▼6.05
Total valid votes		15,143	100.00	
Total rejected ballots		242		
Unreturned ballots		33		
Turnout		15,418	83.22	▲7.18
Registered electors		18,527		
Majority		5,009	33.08	▲12.11
DAP hold		Swing		

Pahang state election, 2008
Party	Candidate	Votes	%	∆%
DAP	Leong Ngah Ngah	7,121	60.49	▲7.76
BN	Tan Tin Loon	4,652	39.51	▼7.76
Total valid votes		11,773	100.00	
Total rejected ballots		274		
Unreturned ballots		0		
Turnout		12,047	76.04	▲1.96
Registered electors		15,844		
Majority		2,469	20.97	▲15.51
DAP gain from DAP		Swing		-

Pahang state election, 2004
Party	Candidate	Votes	%	∆%
DAP	Leong Ngah Ngah	5,845	52.73	▼13.29
BN	Tan Ah Been	5,240	47.27	▲13.29
Total valid votes		11,085	100.00	
Total rejected ballots		297		
Unreturned ballots		10		
Turnout		11,392	74.07	▲0.53
Registered electors		15,380		
Majority		605	5.46	▼26.59
DAP gain from DAP		Swing		-

Pahang state election, 1999: Teriang
Party	Candidate	Votes	%	∆%
DAP	Leong Ngah Ngah	6,078	66.02	▲10.39
BN	Tan Ah Been	3,128	33.98	▼10.39
Total valid votes		9,206	100.00	
Total rejected ballots		245		
Unreturned ballots		0		
Turnout		9,451	73.54	▼5.71
Registered electors		12,852		
Majority		2,950	32.04	▲20.79
DAP gain from DAP		Swing		-

Pahang state election, 1995: Teriang
Party	Candidate	Votes	%	∆%
DAP	Leong Ngah Ngah	5,066	55.63	▲4.43
BN	Lai Kong Gan	4,041	44.37	▲44.37
Total valid votes		9,107	100.00	
Total rejected ballots		245		
Unreturned ballots		485		
Turnout		9,837	79.25	▲0.34
Registered electors		12,413		
Majority		1,025	11.26	▲8.87
DAP hold		Swing		

Pahang state election, 1990: Teriang
Party	Candidate	Votes	%	∆%
DAP	Leong Ngah Ngah	5,360	51.19	▲7.34
BN	Mok San Hong	5,110	48.81	▲1.42
Total valid votes		10,470	100.00	
Total rejected ballots		346		
Unreturned ballots		62		
Turnout		10,878	78.91	▲1.73
Registered electors		13,785		
Majority		250	2.39	▼1.15
DAP gain from BN		Swing		-

Pahang state election, 1986: Teriang
Party	Candidate	Votes	%	∆%
BN	Mok San Hong	3,903	47.38	▲10.18
DAP	Leong Ngah Ngah	3,612	43.85	▲2.11
PAS	Burhan Abd. Ghani	722	8.77	▼2.60
Total valid votes		8,237	100.00	
Total rejected ballots		387		
Unreturned ballots		0		
Turnout		8,624	77.19	▼2.99
Registered electors		11,173		
Majority		291	3.53	▼1.01
BN gain from DAP		Swing		-

Pahang state election, 1982
Party	Candidate	Votes	%	∆%
DAP	Lim Ong Hang	3,081	41.74	▼3.10
BN	Ngau Boon Min	2,746	37.20	▼17.95
PAS	Burhan bin Abd. Ghani	839	11.37	▲11.37
Independent	Teo Thian Lye	609	8.25	▲8.25
Independent	Tan Ah Hong	106	1.44	▲1.44
Total valid votes		7,381	100.00	
Total rejected ballots		172		
Unreturned ballots		0		
Turnout		7,553	80.18	▲0.11
Registered electors		9,420		
Majority		335	4.54	▼5.77
DAP gain from BN		Swing		-

Pahang state election, 1978
Party	Candidate	Votes	%	∆%
BN	Ngau Boon Min	3,194	55.15	▲10.50
DAP	Lim Ong Hang	2,597	44.85	▲44.85
Total valid votes		5,791	100.00	
Total rejected ballots		399		
Unreturned ballots		0		
Turnout		6,190	80.07	▲1.97
Registered electors		7,731		
Majority		597	10.31	▲4.55
BN hold		Swing		

Pahang state election, 1974
Party	Candidate	Votes	%	∆%
BN	Ngau Boon Min	2,064	44.66	▲44.66
Independent	Lim Ong Hang	1,798	38.90	▲38.90
Independent	Tan bin Kassim	610	13.20	▲13.20
Parti Sosialis Rakyat Malaysia	Goh Siau Hock	150	3.25	▲3.25
Total valid votes		4,622	100.00	
Total rejected ballots		256		
Unreturned ballots		0		
Turnout		4,878	78.10	▲9.56
Registered electors		6,246		
Majority		266	5.76	▼8.76
BN hold		Swing		

Pahang state election, 1969
Party	Candidate	Votes	%	∆%
Alliance	Lum Wah Kum	2,464	48.58	▼17.41
DAP	Kong Seng Sai	1,728	34.07	▲34.07
PMIP	Mohamad Awang	560	11.04	▲11.04
Socialist Front	Ab. Aziz Ali	320	6.31	▲6.31
Total valid votes		5,072	100.00	
Total rejected ballots		456		
Unreturned ballots		0		
Turnout		5,528	68.53	▼11.14
Registered electors		8,066		
Majority		736	14.51	▼17.47
Alliance hold		Swing		

Pahang state election, 1964
Party	Candidate	Votes	%	∆%
Alliance	Lum Wah Kum	3,196	65.99	▲14.49
Socialist Front	Yap Kim Chuan	1,647	34.01	▲5.31
Total valid votes		4,843	100.00	
Total rejected ballots		274		
Unreturned ballots		0		
Turnout		5,117	79.68	▼0.28
Registered electors		6,422		
Majority		1,549	31.98	▲9.18
Alliance hold		Swing		

Pahang state election, 1959
Party	Candidate	Votes	%
Alliance	Lum Wah Kum	1,967	51.51
Socialist Front	Yap Kim Chuan	1,096	28.70
PMIP	Abdullah Mohamed	756	19.80
Total valid votes		3,819	100.00
Total rejected ballots		64	
Unreturned ballots		0	
Turnout		3,883	79.96
Registered electors		4,856	
Majority		871	22.81
This was a new constituency created.
