= Liang Teck Meng =

Malaysian politician

Yang Berbahagia Datuk Liang Teck Meng PJN
- 梁德明
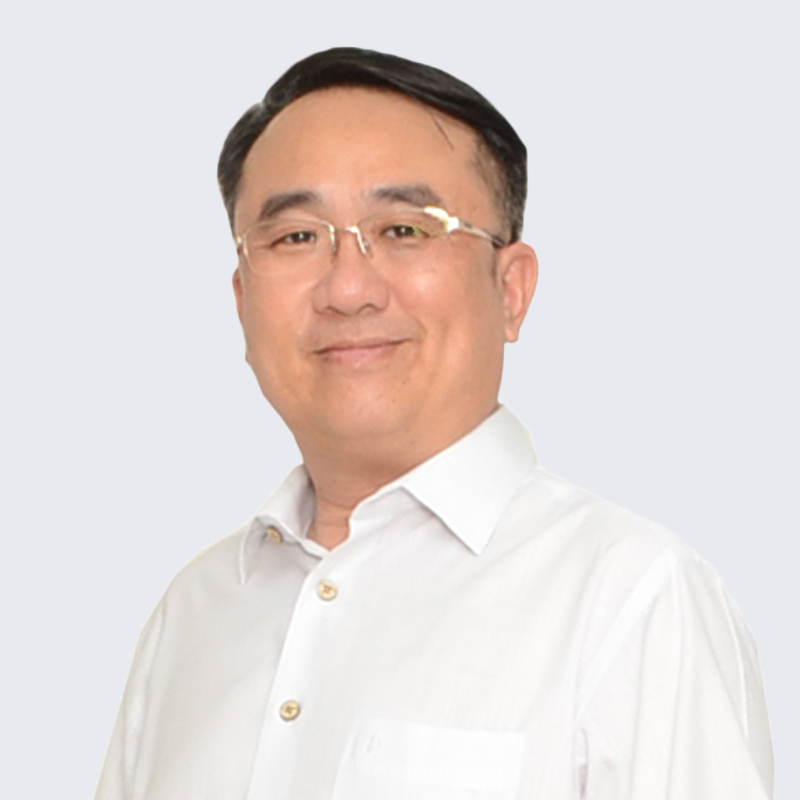

Member of the Malaysian Parliament for Simpang Renggam, Johor
- In office 8 March 2008 – 9 May 2018
- Preceded by: Kerk Choo Ting (BN–Gerakan)
- Succeeded by: Maszlee Malik (PH–BERSATU)
- Majority: 7,853 (2008); 5,706 (2013)

Secretary-General of the Parti Gerakan Rakyat Malaysia
- In office 2013–2018
- President: Mah Siew Keong
- Preceded by: Mah Siew Keong (Acting)
- Succeeded by: Mak Kah Keong

Personal details
- Born: 24 July 1971 (age 55) Johor, Malaysia
- Party: Parti Gerakan Rakyat Malaysia (Gerakan)
- Other political affiliations: Barisan Nasional (BN) (until 2018)
- Children: 2 sons
- Education: Tohoku University
- Occupation: Politician
- Profession: Engineer
- Liang Teck Meng on Facebook

Liang Teck Meng (Chinese: 梁德明; pinyin: Liáng Dé Míng; born 24 July 1971) is a Malaysian politician and was the Member of Parliament (MP) for the Simpang Renggam constituency in the State of Johor (2008 - 2018). He was Secretary General for the Parti Gerakan Rakyat Malaysia (GERAKAN), previously a component party in the Barisan Nasional (BN) coalition (2013 - 2018).

== Education and personal life ==
Liang Teck Meng obtain his secondary education from Foon Yew High School (1984 to 1989). He received a distinction in his SPM and after that he went to the Federal Institute of Technology to study Electrical Engineering (1989 to 1992). Later, he went to study at the Japanese language from the prestigious Asia Student Cultural Association He later went to the Tohoku University, Sendai, Japan to continue in the field of Electrical Engineering.

Liang is an engineer by profession, and is married with two sons.

== Parliamentary career ==
Liang was elected to federal Parliament in the 2008 election, succeeding fellow Gerakan member Kerk Choo Ting in the seat of Simpang Renggam. Liang's victory was one of only two for Gerakan in the 12 federal seats it contested. He was reelected to Parliament in the 2013 election as the only successful GERAKAN candidate, and remained the only Gerakan MP until Mah Siew Keong won the 2014 Telok Intan by-election. However Liang have lost in the 2018 election. 23 June 2018, Liang, Mah Siew Keong and among all leaders have unanimously decided GERAKAN to officially withdraw from BN and now independent party as opposition.

== Election results ==
Parliament of Malaysia
Year	Constituency	Candidate	Votes	Pct	Opponent(s)	Votes	Pct	Ballots cast	Majority	Turnout
2008	P151 Simpang Renggam	Liang Teck Meng (Gerakan)	16,450	65.68%	Atan Gombang (PAS)	8,597	34.32%	25,998	7,853	74.58%
2013	P151 Simpang Renggam	Liang Teck Meng (Gerakan)	19,754	58.44%	Suhaizan Kayat (PAS)	14,048	41.56%	34,754	5,706	86.58%
2018	P151 Simpang Renggam	Liang Teck Meng (Gerakan)	14,682	40.99%	Maszlee Malik (BERSATU)	18,157	50.69%	43,998	3,475	83.40%
2018	P151 Simpang Renggam	Liang Teck Meng (Gerakan)	14,682	40.99%	Mohd Jubri Selamat (PAS)	2,983	8.32%	43,998	3,475	83.40%

== Honours ==
- Malaysia
  - Commander of the Order of Meritorious Service (PJN) – Datuk (2014)

== See also ==
- Simpang Renggam (federal constituency)
