= List of Universiti Teknologi MARA people =

This is a list of notable people affiliated with Universiti Teknologi MARA.

== Administration and faculty ==
- Emeritus Prof. Datuk Dr. Shad Saleem Faruqi, emeritus professor of law at the Faculty of Law
- Abdul Razak Abdul Hamid, created the Japanese language program for the Centre of Preparatory Education at Institute Teknologi Mara, the predecessor of the Universiti Teknologi MARA.
- Prof. Dato' Dr. Rahmat Mohamad, Secretary General of Asian-African Legal Consultative Organization (New Delhi, India)

== Alumni ==
=== Law ===
- The Right Honourable Tan Sri Datuk Seri Panglima Richard Malanjum, the Chief Judge of the High Court in Sabah and Sarawak
- Puan Hasbi Hassan, Judge of the Kuala Lumpur Criminal Sessions Court
- Datuk Zaid Ibrahim, founder of the largest law firm in Malaysia, President of Parti Kesejahteraan Insan Tanah Air, former Senator, former Minister in the Prime Minister's Department and former member of the Central Leadership Council (Majlis Pimpinan Pusat), Parti Keadilan Rakyat.
- Yunalis Zarai, a Malaysian Indie singer
- Khairul Idzwan, a former practising lawyer and an avid blogger at kakijalans.com
- Dyana Sofya Mohd Daud, a DAP Candidate for Teluk Intan by-election, 2014, a former political secretary for prominent leader of the Democratic Action Party Lim Kit Siang, have own law firm at Cyberjaya

=== Public Administration ===
- Datuk Seri Azalina Othman Said, former Minister of Tourism, Malaysia, Minister in Prime Minister's Department
- Dato' Markiman Kobiran, Special Officer to the Minister of Home Affairs, former Malaysian Member of Parliament

=== Business ===
- Tan Sri Musa Aman, the former Chief Minister for the state of Sabah
- Datuk Kamarudin Meranun, Chairman of AirAsia

=== Banking ===
- Yang Amat Mulia Permaisuri Siti Aishah binti Abdul Rahman, former Duli Yang Maha Mulia Raja Permaisuri Agong, the Queen of Malaysia

=== Communication and Media Studies ===
- Datuk Manja Ismail, editor for Berita Harian, a Malaysian daily newspaper
- Datuk Zakaria Wahab, former Press Secretary to Mahathir Mohamad and BERNAMA correspondence in Singapore
- Marsila Hassan, News anchor TV3 (Malaysian TV network)

=== Engineering ===
- Datuk Ir. Mohd. Zin Mohamed, former Malaysia's Works Minister
- Mr. Azrulein Ibrahim, Malaysia's Lab Engineer and Designer
- Tan Sri Dato' Sri Prof. Ir. Dr. Sahol Hamid Abu Bakar, Former Vice-Chancellor of Universiti Teknologi MARA (2009-2016)
