= Teluk Intan (federal constituency) =

Federal constituency in Perak, Malaysia

Teluk Intan (P076)
Perak constituency

Federal constituency
- Legislature: Dewan Rakyat
- MP: Nga Kor Ming; PH
- Constituency created: 1955
- First contested: 1955
- Last contested: 2022

Demographics
- Population (2020): 103,065
- Electors (2022): 87,222
- Area (km²): 774
- Pop. density (per km²): 133.2

Teluk Intan (formerly Telok Intan & Telok Anson) is a federal constituency in Bagan Datuk District and Hilir Perak District, Perak, Malaysia, that has been represented in the Dewan Rakyat since 1955.

The federal constituency was created in the 1955 redistribution and is mandated to return a single member to the Dewan Rakyat under the first past the post voting system.

== Demographics ==
Ethnic breakdown of Teluk Intan's electorate as of 2022
1. Malay (42.0%)
2. Chinese (38.3%)
3. Indian (18.7%)
4. Other ethnicities (1.00%)

As of 2020, Teluk Intan has a population of 103,065 people.

Age breakdown of Teluk Intan's electorate as of 2022
1. 18–20 (4.98%)
2. 21–29 (19.2%)
3. 30–39 (22.3%)
4. 40–49 (16.5%)
5. 50–59 (14.0%)
6. 60–69 (12.7%)
7. 70–79 (7.24%)
8. 80–89 (2.40%)
9. above 90 (0.64%)
Gender breakdown of Teluk Intan's electorate as of 2022
1. Male (49.0%)
2. Female (51.0%)

== History ==
=== Polling districts ===
According to the federal gazette issued on 31 October 2022, the Teluk Intan constituency is divided into 37 polling districts.

State constituency	Polling District	Code	Location
Pasir Bedamar (N55)	Sungai Suli	076/55/01	SJK (C) Chung Hwa
Pasir Bedamar (N55)	Sungai Timah	076/55/02	SJK (T) Ladang Sungai Timah
Pasir Bedamar (N55)	Pasir Bedamar Barat	076/55/03	SJK (C) San Min 1; SJK (C) San Min 2
Pasir Bedamar (N55)	Pasir Bedamar Utara	076/55/04	SJK (C) San Min 1; SJK (C) San Min 2
Pasir Bedamar (N55)	Pasir Bedamar Tengah	076/55/05	SJK (C) Phooi Yong
Pasir Bedamar (N55)	Pasir Bedamar Selatan	076/55/06	SJK (C) Phooi Yong
Pasir Bedamar (N55)	Jalan Market Barat	076/55/07	SJK (T) Thiruvalluvar
Pasir Bedamar (N55)	Jalan Market Timor	076/55/08	SMK Convent
Pasir Bedamar (N55)	Jalan Anson	076/55/09	SK Seri Intan
Pasir Bedamar (N55)	Jalan Canal	076/55/10	SK Horley Methodist
Pasir Bedamar (N55)	Jalan Speedy	076/55/11	SMK St. Anthony
Pasir Bedamar (N55)	Jalan Sungai Nibong	076/55/12	SK Sultan Idris 2
Pasir Bedamar (N55)	Eastern Garden	076/55/13	SK St. Anthony
Pasir Bedamar (N55)	Jalan Laxamana	076/55/14	SJK (T) Sithambaram Pillay
Pasir Bedamar (N55)	Kampong Guru	076/55/15	SK Perempuan Methodist
Pasir Bedamar (N55)	Jalan Batak Rabit Utara	076/55/16	SMK Sultan Abdul Aziz
Pasir Bedamar (N55)	Jalan Batak Rabit Selatan	076/55/17	SJK (C) Chong Min
Pasir Bedamar (N55)	Taman Seri Setia	076/55/18	SK Sultan Abdul Aziz
Pasir Bedamar (N55)	Pekan Baru	076/55/19	SMK Raja Muda Musa
Changkat Jong (N56)	Sungai Tunku	076/56/01	SRA Rakyat Al-Hijrah Sungai Tunku
Changkat Jong (N56)	Kampong Bahagia	076/56/02	SK Kampong Bahagia; SMK Kampung Bahagia
Changkat Jong (N56)	Sungai Kerawai	076/56/03	SK Sungai Kerawai
Changkat Jong (N56)	Ladang Sussex	076/56/04	SJK (T) Dato' Sithambaram Pillay
Changkat Jong (N56)	Ladang Selaba	076/56/05	SJK (T) Ladang Selaba
Changkat Jong (N56)	Taman Cecily	076/56/06	SMK Seri Perak
Changkat Jong (N56)	Kampong Padang Tembak	076/56/07	SK Seri Setia; SMK Seri Kandi
Changkat Jong (N56)	Kampong Banjar	076/56/08	SK Tebok Banjar
Changkat Jong (N56)	Batak Rabit	076/56/09	SK Dato' Laksamana Raja Mahkota; SJK (T) Ladang Batak Rabit
Changkat Jong (N56)	Nova Scotia	076/56/10	SJK (T) Ladang Nova Scotia 1
Changkat Jong (N56)	Kampong Selaba	076/56/11	SK Selabak
Changkat Jong (N56)	Batu Dua Belas Utara	076/56/12	SJK (C) Batu Duabelas
Changkat Jong (N56)	Kampong Baru Ayer Hitam	076/56/13	SK Ayer Hitam
Changkat Jong (N56)	Kampong Changkat Jong	076/56/14	SK Changkat Jong
Changkat Jong (N56)	Kampong Sungai Samak	076/56/15	SK Sungai Samak
Changkat Jong (N56)	Sungai Bugis	076/56/16	SRA Al-Munir Sungai Manila
Changkat Jong (N56)	Ladang Sungai Samak	076/56/17	SJK (T) Ladang Sungai Samak
Changkat Jong (N56)	Ladang Ulu Bernam	076/56/18	SK Ulu Bernam

=== Representation history ===
Members of Parliament for Teluk Intan
Parliament	No	Years	Member	Party	Vote Share
Constituency created
Telok Anson
Federal Legislative Council
1st		1955-1959	Bahaman Samsudin (بهامن شمس الدين)	Alliance (UMNO)	10,514; 73.39%
Parliament of the Federation of Malaya
1st	P055	1959-1961	Woo Saik Hong (胡锡康)	Alliance (MCA)	10,174; 63.81%
1st	P055	1961-1963	Too Joon Hing (朱运兴)	Independent	11,943; 56.86%
Parliament of Malaysia
1st	P055	1963-1964	Too Joon Hing (朱运兴)	Independent	11,943; 56.86%
2nd	P055	1964-1969	Ng Kam Poh (吴锦波)	Alliance (MCA)	12,251; 57.10%
		1969-1971	Parliament was suspended		
3rd	P055	1971-1974	Chan Fu King (陈富景)	DAP	12,297; 55.30%
4th	P062	1974-1978	Au How Cheong (欧效翔)	BN (GERAKAN)	9,685; 50.91%
5th	P062	1978-1982	Au How Cheong (欧效翔)	BN (GERAKAN)	12,773; 50.44%
6th	P062	1982-1986	Au How Cheong (欧效翔)	BN (GERAKAN)	13,475; 49.21%
Telok Intan
7th	P070	1986–1990	Ong Tin Kim (王添庆)	BN (GERAKAN)	15,152; 49.62%
8th	P070	1990–1995	Ong Tin Kim (王添庆)	BN (GERAKAN)	17,610; 53.19%
9th	P073	1995–1997	Ong Tin Kim (王添庆)	BN (GERAKAN)	21,641; 57.70%
9th	P073	1997–1999	Kulasegaran Murugeson (மு.குலசேகரன்)	GR (DAP)	15,007; 55.38%
10th	P073	1999–2004	Mah Siew Keong (马袖强)	BN (GERAKAN)	18,576; 54.05%
11th	P076	2004–2008	Mah Siew Keong (马袖强)	BN (GERAKAN)	18,870; 55.78%
12th	P076	2008–2013	Manogaran Marimuthu (மனோகரன் மரிமுத்து)	PR (DAP)	18,486; 52.07%
13th	P076	2013–2014	Seah Leong Peng (谢良凭)	PR (DAP)	27,399; 57.36%
13th	P076	2014–2018	Mah Siew Keong (马袖强)	BN (GERAKAN)	20,157; 50.30%
Teluk Intan
14th	P076	2018–2022	Nga Kor Ming (倪可敏)	PH (DAP)	29,170; 54.37%
15th	P076	2022–present	Nga Kor Ming (倪可敏)	PH (DAP)	33,133; 51.61%

=== State constituency ===
Parliamentary constituency	State constituency						
Parliamentary constituency	1955–1959*	1959–1974	1974–1986	1986–1995	1995–2004	2004–2018	2018–present
Telok Anson		Batak Rabit					
Telok Anson			Changkat Jong				
Telok Anson	Lower Perak South						
Telok Anson		Pasir Bedamar					
Telok Anson	Teluk Anson						
Telok Intan				Changkat Jong			
Telok Intan				Pasir Bedamar			
Teluk Intan							Changkat Jong
Teluk Intan							Pasir Bedamar

=== Historical boundaries ===
State Constituency	Area					
State Constituency	1959	1974	1984	1994	2003	2018
Batak Rabit	Batak Rabit; Changkat Jong; Jendarata; Langkap; Teluk Bharu					
Changkat Jong		Batak Rabit; Changkat Jong; Jendarata; Kampung Ayer Hitam; Teluk Bharu	Batak Rabit; Changkat Jong; Kampung Selabak; Lubok Banting; Sungai Tunku			
Pasir Bedamar	Kampung Bahagia; Kampung Goh Hong; Kampung Sungai Kerawai; Pasir Bedamar; Teluk Intan		Eastern Garden; Kampung Bahagia; Pasir Bedamar; Taman Seri Setia; Teluk Intan	Eastern Garden; Pasir Bedamar; Taman Indah Jaya; Taman Seri Setia; Teluk Intan		

=== Current state assembly members ===
No.	State Constituency	Member	Coalition (Party)
N55	Pasir Bedamar	Woo Kah Leong	PH (DAP)
N56	Changkat Jong	Nadziruddin Mohamed Bandi	PN (BERSATU)

=== Local governments & postcodes ===
No.	State Constituency	Local Government	Postcode
N55	Pasir Bedamar	Teluk Intan Municipal Council	36000, 36010, 36020, 36030 Teluk Intan; 36400 Hutan Melintang; 36700 Langkap
N56	Changkat Jong	Teluk Intan Municipal Council	36000, 36010, 36020, 36030 Teluk Intan; 36400 Hutan Melintang; 36700 Langkap

== Election results ==
Malaysian general election, 2022
Party	Candidate	Votes	%	∆%
PH	David Nga Kor Ming	33,133	51.61	▲51.61
PN	Zainol Fadzi Paharudin	17,964	27.98	▲27.98
BN	Murugiah Thopasamy	12,304	19.17	▼14.36
PEJUANG	Ahmad Khusyairi Mohamad Tanusi	793	1.24	▲1.24
Total valid votes		64,194	100.00	
Total rejected ballots		716		
Unreturned ballots		218		
Turnout		65,128	73.60	▼7.52
Registered electors		87,222		
Majority		15,169	23.63	▲2.80
PH hold		Swing		
Source(s) https://lom.agc.gov.my/ilims/upload/portal/akta/outputp/1753277/PUB610%20PARLIMEN%20PERAK.pdf

Malaysian general election, 2018
Party	Candidate	Votes	%	∆%
PKR	David Nga Kor Ming	29,170	54.37	▲54.37
BN	Mah Siew Keong	17,991	33.53	▼16.77
PAS	Ahmad Ramadzan Ahmad Daud	6,494	12.10	▲12.10
Total valid votes		53,655	100.00	
Total rejected ballots		742		
Unreturned ballots		204		
Turnout		54,601	81.12	▲13.73
Registered electors		66,487		
Majority		11,179	20.83	▲20.23
PKR gain from BN		Swing		?
Source(s) "His Majesty's Government Gazette - Notice of Contested Election, Parliament for the State of Perak [P.U. (B) 237/2018]" (PDF). Attorney General's Chambers of Malaysia. 3 May 2018. "Federal Government Gazette - Results of Contested Election and Statements of the Poll after the Official Addition of Votes, Parliamentary Constituencies for the State of Perak [P.U. (B) 311/2018]" (PDF). Attorney General's Chambers of Malaysia. 28 May 2018.

Malaysian general by-election, 31 May 2014: Telok Intan Upon the death of incumbent, Seah Leong Peng
Party	Candidate	Votes	%	∆%
BN	Mah Siew Keong	20,157	50.30	▲8.24
DAP	Dyana Sofya Mohd Daud	19,919	49.70	▼7.66
Total valid votes		40,076	100.00	
Total rejected ballots		543		
Unreturned ballots		49		
Turnout		40,668	67.39	▲13.36
Registered electors		60,349		
Majority		238	0.60	▼14.70
BN gain from DAP		Swing		?
Source(s) "Pilihan Raya Kecil P.076 Telok Intan". Election Commission of Malaysia. "Federal Government Gazette - Notice of Contested Election - By-election of the Dewan Rakyat of P.076 Telok Intan for the State of Perak [P.U. (B) 220/2014]" (PDF). Attorney General's Chambers of Malaysia. 19 May 2014. "P. U. (B) 275/2014 Federal Government Gazette - Results of Contested Election and Statement of the Poll after the Official Addition of Votes for the By-election of P.076 Telok Intan" (PDF). Attorney General's Chambers of Malaysia. 3 June 2014.

Malaysian general election, 2013: Telok Intan
Party	Candidate	Votes	%	∆%
DAP	Seah Leong Peng	27,399	57.36	▲5.29
BN	Mah Siew Keong	20,086	42.06	▼5.87
Independent	Moralingam Kannan	279	0.58	▲0.58
Total valid votes		47,764	100.00	
Total rejected ballots		885		
Unreturned ballots		190		
Turnout		48,839	80.75	▲10.58
Registered electors		60,483		
Majority		7,313	15.30	▲11.16
DAP hold		Swing		
Source(s) "Federal Government Gazette - Notice of Contested Election, Parliament for the State of Perak [P.U. (B) 174/2013]" (PDF). Attorney General's Chambers of Malaysia. 26 April 2013. Archived from the original (PDF) on 2019-12-29. "Federal Government Gazette - Results of Contested Election and Statements of the Poll after the Official Addition of Votes, Parliamentary Constituencies for the State of Perak [P.U. (B) 215/2013]" (PDF). Attorney General's Chambers of Malaysia. 22 May 2013.

Malaysian general election, 2008: Telok Intan
Party	Candidate	Votes	%	∆%
DAP	Manogaran Marimuthu	18,486	52.07	▲25.97
BN	Mah Siew Keong	17,016	47.93	▼7.85
Total valid votes		35,502	100.00	
Total rejected ballots		1,153		
Unreturned ballots		84		
Turnout		36,739	70.17	▲4.06
Registered electors		52,354		
Majority		1,470	4.14	▼25.54
DAP gain from BN		Swing		?

Malaysian general election, 2004: Telok Intan
Party	Candidate	Votes	%	∆%
BN	Mah Siew Keong	18,870	55.78	▲1.73
DAP	Wu Him Ven	8,829	26.10	▼19.85
PKR	Gobalakrishnan Nagapan	6,128	18.12	▲18.12
Total valid votes		33,827	100.00	
Total rejected ballots		1,172		
Unreturned ballots		83		
Turnout		35,082	66.11	▲3.40
Registered electors		53,066		
Majority		10,041	29.68	▲21.58
BN hold		Swing		

Malaysian general election, 1999: Telok Intan
Party	Candidate	Votes	%	∆%
BN	Mah Siew Keong	18,576	54.05	▲9.43
DAP	Raj Nallaiya	15,793	45.95	▼9.43
Total valid votes		34,369	100.00	
Total rejected ballots		1,084		
Unreturned ballots		47		
Turnout		35,500	62.71	▲9.04
Registered electors		56,609		
Majority		2,783	8.10	▼2.66
BN gain from DAP		Swing		?

Malaysian general by-election, 17 May 1997: Telok Intan Upon the death of incumbent, Ong Tin Kim
Party	Candidate	Votes	%	∆%
DAP	Kulasegaran Murugeson	15,007	55.38	▲31.38
BN	Chee See Choke	12,091	44.62	▼23.08
Total valid votes		27,098	100.00	
Total rejected ballots		541		
Unreturned ballots		0		
Turnout		27,639	53.67	▼10.76
Registered electors		51,500		
Majority		2,916	10.76	▼32.94
DAP gain from BN		Swing		?

Malaysian general election, 1995: Telok Intan
Party	Candidate	Votes	%	∆%
BN	Ong Tin Kim @ Wong Thean Ching	21,641	67.70	▲14.51
DAP	Proso Watma @ Prosothman Appoo	7,673	24.00	▼22.81
PAS	Hafith Jaafar	2,651	8.29	▲8.29
Total valid votes		31,965	100.00	
Total rejected ballots		1,090		
Unreturned ballots		125		
Turnout		33,180	64.43	▼4.13
Registered electors		51,497		
Majority		13,968	43.70	▲37.32
BN hold		Swing		

Malaysian general election, 1990: Telok Intan
Party	Candidate	Votes	%	∆%
BN	Ong Tin Kim @ Wong Thean Ching	17,610	53.19	▲3.57
DAP	M. G. Pandithan	15,499	46.81	▲1.91
Total valid votes		33,109	100.00	
Total rejected ballots		987		
Unreturned ballots		0		
Turnout		34,096	68.56	▲1.89
Registered electors		49,732		
Majority		2,111	6.38	▲1.66
BN hold		Swing		

Malaysian general election, 1986: Telok Intan
Party	Candidate	Votes	%	∆%
BN	Ong Tin Kim @ Wong Thean Ching	15,152	49.62	▲0.41
DAP	Fadzlan Yahya	13,709	44.90	▼1.27
PAS	Nadzri Bahaudin	1,673	5.48	▲0.86
Total valid votes		30,534	100.00	
Total rejected ballots		697		
Unreturned ballots		0		
Turnout		31,231	66.67	▼2.89
Registered electors		46,847		
Majority		1,443	4.72	▲1.68
BN hold		Swing		

Malaysian general election, 1982: Telok Anson
Party	Candidate	Votes	%	∆%
BN	Au How Cheong @ Haw Hew Kheong	13,475	49.21	▼1.23
DAP	Chan Fu King	12,643	46.17	▲1.23
PAS	Shamsuddin Tamyis	1,265	4.62	▲0.01
Total valid votes		27,383	100.00	
Total rejected ballots		705		
Unreturned ballots		0		
Turnout		28,088	69.56	▼5.96
Registered electors		40,382		
Majority		832	3.04	▲2.46
BN hold		Swing		

Malaysian general election, 1978: Telok Anson
Party	Candidate	Votes	%	∆%
BN	Au How Cheong @ Haw Hew Kheong	12,773	50.44	▼0.47
DAP	Chan Fu King	11,380	44.94	▲0.59
PAS	Mohamad Ngah	1,168	4.61	▲4.61
Total valid votes		25,321	100.00	
Total rejected ballots		797		
Unreturned ballots		0		
Turnout		26,118	75.52	▲8.08
Registered electors		34,585		
Majority		1,393	5.50	▼1.06
BN hold		Swing		

Malaysian general election, 1974: Telok Anson
Party	Candidate	Votes	%	∆%
BN	Au How Cheong @ Haw Hew Kheong	9,685	50.91	▲50.91
DAP	Chan Fu King	8,436	44.35	▼10.95
PEKEMAS	Chai Kai Wooi	901	4.74	▲4.74
Total valid votes		19,022	100.00	
Total rejected ballots		596		
Unreturned ballots		0		
Turnout		19,618	67.44	▲1.17
Registered electors		29,089		
Majority		1,249	6.56	▼10.41
BN gain from DAP		Swing		?

Malaysian general election, 1969: Telok Anson
Party	Candidate	Votes	%	∆%
DAP	Chan Fu King	12,297	55.30	▲55.30
Alliance	Ng Kam Poh	8,523	38.33	▲18.77
PMIP	Maslan Abdullah	1,417	6.37	▲6.37
Total valid votes		22,237	100.00	
Total rejected ballots		1,274		
Unreturned ballots		0		
Turnout		23,511	66.27	▼11.90
Registered electors		35,475		
Majority		3,774	16.97	▲2.77
DAP gain from Alliance		Swing		?

Malaysian general election, 1964: Telok Anson
Party	Candidate	Votes	%	∆%
Alliance	Ng Kam Poh	12,251	57.10	▲15.27
Socialist Front	Chai Kai Wooi	9,204	42.90	▲42.90
Total valid votes		21,455	100.00	
Total rejected ballots		1,317		
Unreturned ballots		0		
Turnout		22,772	78.17	
Registered electors		29,130		
Majority		3,047	14.20	▼20.68
Alliance gain from Independent		Swing		?

Malaysian general by-election, 30 May 1961: Telok Anson Upon the death of incumbent, Woo Saik Hong
Party	Candidate	Votes	%	∆%
Independent	Too Joon Hing	11,943	56.86	▲56.86
Alliance	Wah Keng Jooi	8,787	41.83	▼21.98
Independent	Abdul Rashid Nanek @ Mak Fie Hoong	274	1.30	▲1.30
Total valid votes		21,004	100.00	
Total rejected ballots		195		
Unreturned ballots		0		
Turnout		21,199		
Registered electors				
Majority		3,156	34.88	▲7.26
Independent gain from Alliance		Swing		?

Malayan general election, 1959: Telok Anson
Party	Candidate	Votes	%	∆%
Alliance	Woo Saik Hong	10,174	63.81	▼9.58
PPP	Tan Poh Aun	5,770	36.19	▲36.19
Total valid votes		15,944	100.00	
Total rejected ballots		218		
Unreturned ballots		0		
Turnout		16,162	71.00	▼10.90
Registered electors		22,762		
Majority		4,404	27.62	▼20.06
Alliance hold		Swing		

Malayan general election, 1955: Telok Anson
Party	Candidate	Votes	%
Alliance	Bahaman Samsuddin	10,514	73.39
PMIP	Hassan Adli Hassan	3,812	26.61
Total valid votes		14,326	100.00
Total rejected ballots			
Unreturned ballots			
Turnout		14,326	81.90
Registered electors		17,492	
Majority		7,952	46.78
This was a new constituency created.
Source(s): The Straits Times.
