= Kerk Choo Ting =

Taiping Member of Parliament (died 2018)

Yang Berbahagia Dato' Seri Kerk Choo Ting DGPN DPMP
- 郭洙镇

Deputy Minister of Agriculture and Agro-based Industry II
- In office 27 March 2004 – 14 February 2006 Serving with Mohd Shariff Omar
- Monarch: Sirajuddin
- Prime Minister: Abdullah Ahmad Badawi
- Minister: Muhyiddin Yassin
- Preceded by: New position
- Succeeded by: Mah Siew Keong
- Constituency: Simpang Renggam

Member of the Malaysian Parliament for Simpang Renggam, Johor
- In office 21 March 2004 – 8 March 2008
- Preceded by: New constituency
- Succeeded by: Liang Teck Meng (BN–Gerakan)
- Majority: 14,155 (2004)

Member of the Malaysian Parliament for Taiping, Perak
- In office 20 October 1990 – 21 March 2004
- Preceded by: Paul Leong Khee Seong (BN–Gerakan)
- Succeeded by: M. Kayveas (BN–PPP)
- Majority: 2,585 (1990); 16,767 (1995); 3,969 (1999)

Personal details
- Born: 14 April 1941 Johor, Japanese occupation of Malaya
- Died: 22 May 2018 (aged 77)
- Party: Parti Gerakan Rakyat Malaysia (Gerakan) (–2018)
- Other political affiliations: Barisan Nasional (BN) (–2018)

Kerk Kim Tim @ Kerk Choo Ting (14 April 1941 – 22 May 2018) was a former Taiping Member of Parliament and deputy president of the Parti Gerakan Rakyat Malaysia (Gerakan). He was also the former Deputy Minister of International Trade and Industry and Deputy Minister of Agriculture and Agro-based II before being replaced by Mah Siew Keong. His ministry was led by Muhyiddin Yassin at the time.

In the 1970s, Kerk served as legal counsel of a Chinese independent high school association. In the 1982 Malaysian state election, Kerk stood as Gerakan candidate on a Chinese educationalist platform. In 1999, he was appointed as the Deputy Minister of International Trade and Industry by Prime Minister Mahathir Mohamad.

On 22 May 2018, Kerk Choo Ting died.

== Election results ==
Parliament of Malaysia
Year	Constituency	Candidate	Votes	Pct	Opponent(s)	Votes	Pct	Ballots cast	Majority	Turnout
1982	P084 Kepong	Kerk Choo Ting (Gerakan)	28,163	48.44%	Tan Seng Giaw (DAP)	29,368	50.51%	59,465	1,205	76.94%
1982	P084 Kepong	Kerk Choo Ting (Gerakan)	28,163	48.44%	Ishak Ibrahim (IND)	613	1.05%	59,465	1,205	76.94%
1990	P054 Taiping	Kerk Choo Ting (Gerakan)	22,162	50.87%	Kong Cheok Seng (DAP)	19,577	44.94%	44,642	2,585	71.14%
1990	P054 Taiping	Kerk Choo Ting (Gerakan)	22,162	50.87%	Said Abu Hassan (IND)	1,827	4.19%	44,642	2,585	71.14%
1995	P057 Taiping	Kerk Choo Ting (Gerakan)	30,459	68.99%	Haradeyan Singh @ Hardayal Singh (DAP)	13,692	31.01%	47,930	16,767	70.13%
1999	P057 Taiping	Kerk Choo Ting (Gerakan)	24,531	53.65%	Lim Kean Ghee (DAP)	20,562	44.96%	50,809	3,969	68.99%
1999	P057 Taiping	Kerk Choo Ting (Gerakan)	24,531	53.65%	Ng Hoe Hun (MDP)	637	1.39%	50,809	3,969	68.99%
2004	P151 Simpang Renggam	Kerk Choo Ting (Gerakan)	18,997	79.69%	Atan Gombang (PAS)	4,842	20.31%	24,888	14,155	72.69%

== Honours ==
- Perak
  - Knight Commander of the Order of the Perak State Crown (DPMP) – Dato' (1997)
- Penang
  - Commander of the Order of the Defender of State (DGPN) – Dato' Seri (2002)
