= Dyana Sofya Mohd Daud =

Malaysian politician

- ديان سوفيا محمد داود
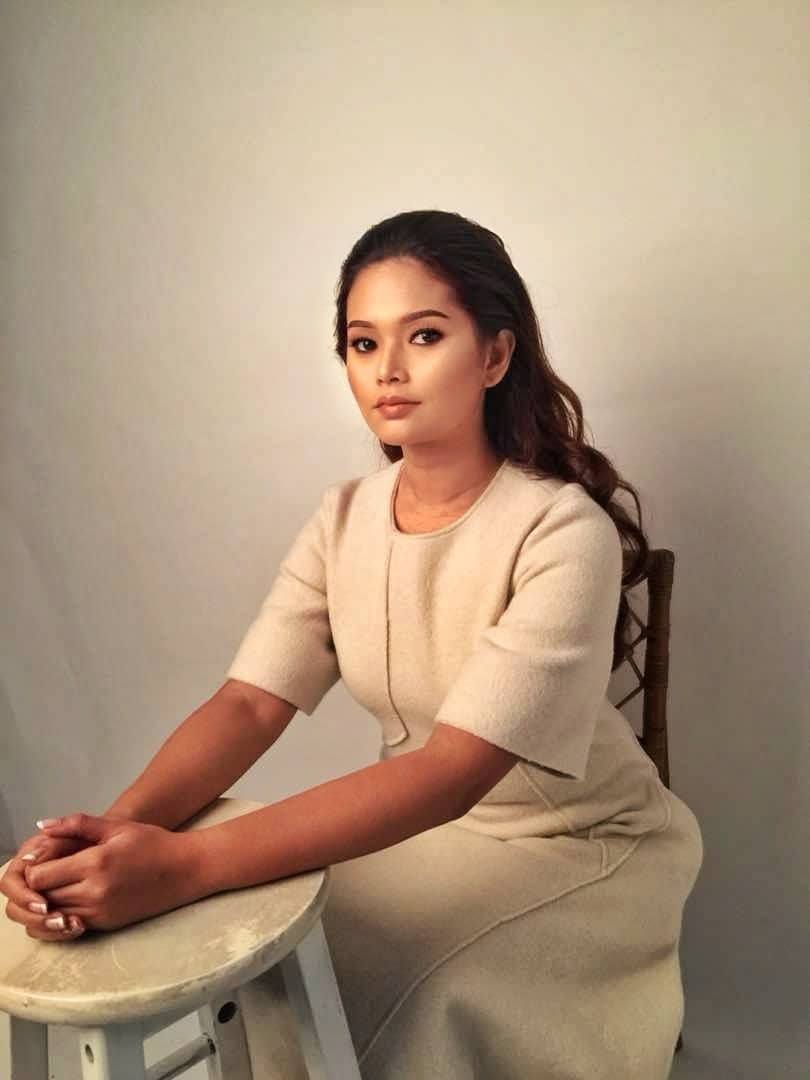
- Dyana Sofya in 2018

Personal details
- Born: Dyana Sofya binti Mohd Daud; 29 December 1987 (age 38) Ipoh, Perak, Malaysia
- Party: Democratic Action Party (DAP) (2012–present)
- Other political affiliations: Pakatan Rakyat (PR) (2012–2015); Pakatan Harapan (2015–present)
- Spouse: Zairil Khir Johari (m. 2018)
- Education: Universiti Teknologi MARA, School of Oriental and African Studies, University of London
- Occupation: Political secretary, lawyer

Dyana Sofya Mohd Daud (Jawi: ديان سوفيا محمد داود; born 29 December 1987) is a Malaysian lawyer and politician. She is the former political secretary to Democratic Action Party (DAP) veteran leader and Member of Parliament Lim Kit Siang. Dyana is also a columnist for The Malay Mail Online and Sinar Harian, a national Malay-language daily. She has also written a book called Di Sini Bermula (An Earthly Beginning) which contains her compilation of her articles written for The Malay Mail Online. Following her return from the UK in 2016, Dyana became a partner in Ayub & Co, a legal firm based in Shah Alam, Selangor. She is now a partner in Zharif Nizamuddin.

== Education ==
Dyana obtained her Bachelor of Law (Hons) (LLB) degree from UiTM. She was admitted to the Malaysian Bar in 2011.

Dyana completed her postgraduate studies at School of Oriental and African Studies, University of London, where she obtained a Master of Arts with merit in international studies and diplomacy.

== Political career ==
=== Entry into politics ===
In January 2012, Dyana joined Democratic Action Party and she was subsequently elected into DAP Perak Youth Wing's executive committee. She was then appointed political secretary to DAP Parliamentary Leader Lim Kit Siang, and played an active role during the 13th Malaysian general election campaigning for Lim Kit Siang for the parliamentary seat of Gelang Patah, Johor. She subsequently vacated her post as political secretary when she left to pursue her postgraduate studies in London in September 2015.

=== 2014 Telok Intan by-election ===
Following the vacancy of Telok Intan parliamentary seat due to the death of its member of parliament, Seah Leong Peng, Dyana was nominated as the DAP candidate for the 2014 Telok Intan by-election where her victory would have allowed her to become the first ever female Malay Member of Parliament for the DAP. However, she lost by a narrow margin to a veteran politician, Mah Siew Keong in the by-election.

=== Post 2014 Telok Intan by-election ===
After her defeat, Dyana remained in Teluk Intan acting in the capacity of Chairman of DAP Teluk Intan Community Center, operating the community service centre with the state assemblyman for Pasir Bedamar, Terence Naidu. She was also appointed as DAP Perak state committee member and executive committee in National DAP Youth wing.

During this time, she initiated the Teluk Intan Colour Run, the first event of its kind in Teluk Intan which has become an annual landmark attracting 800-1000 participants yearly. According to Dyana, the run is meant is to celebrate diversity, where "no matter what our colour... we are all headed towards the same finishing line."

In 2015, Dyana was also responsible for launching a RM10 donation drive to raise funds for a new fishermen's jetty at Kampung Esso Following the campaign's success, she launched a similar donation drive for a fishermen's jetty at Kampung Belakang Kilang Padi on the Perak River.

== Personal life ==
Dyana is married to Zairil Khir Johari, a Malaysian politician and current Penang State Executive Councillor.

== Election results ==
Parliament of Malaysia
Year	Constituency	Candidate	Votes	Pct	Opponent(s)	Votes	Pct	Ballots cast	Majority	Turnout
2014	P076 Telok Intan	Dyana Sofya Mohd Daud (DAP)	19,919	49.70%	Mah Siew Keong (Gerakan)	20,157	50.30%	40,668	238	67.39%

== Accolades and recognition ==
In 2015, Dyana was selected by the United States Department of State to participate in the International Visitor Leadership Program, a premier professional exchange programme that allows current and emerging foreign leaders to visit the United States to develop networks with their American counterparts. Later in the year, Dyana was selected by the Australian Department of Foreign Affairs and Trade to participate in the Australia-Malaysia Muslim Exchange Programme.

In 2015, Dyana was featured by Marie Claire magazine as a leading Malaysian female personality in support of Marie Claire's Wake Up to a Good Cause campaign. The campaign seeks to support Women's Aid Organisation (WAO) in highlighted abuse against women.
