= Seah Leong Peng =

Malaysian politician (1966–2014)

- 谢昂凭

Member of the Malaysian Parliament for Teluk Intan
- In office 5 May 2013 – 1 May 2014
- Preceded by: Manogaran Marimuthu (PR–DAP)
- Succeeded by: Mah Siew Keong (BN–GERAKAN)
- Majority: 7,313 (2013)

Member of the Perak State Legislative Assembly for Pasir Bedamar
- In office 29 November 1999 – 5 May 2013
- Preceded by: Mah Siew Keong (BN–Gerakan)
- Succeeded by: Terence Naidu (PR–DAP)
- Majority: 5,038 (1999); 3,391 (2004); 7,914 (2008)

Personal details
- Born: Seah Leong Peng; 1966
- Died: 1 May 2014 (aged 48)
- Citizenship: Malaysian
- Party: Democratic Action Party (DAP)
- Other political affiliations: Barisan Alternatif (BA) (1999–2004); Pakatan Rakyat (PR) (2008–2014)
- Education: University of Glasgow
- Occupation: Politician

Seah Leong Peng (1966 – 1 May 2014) was a Malaysian politician who served as the Member of Parliament (MP) for Teluk Intan from May 2013 to his death in May 2014 and Member of the Perak State Legislative Assembly for Pasir Bedamar from November 1999 to May 2013. He was a member of the Democratic Action Party (DAP), a component party of formerly the Barisan Alternatif (BA) and Pakatan Rakyat (PR) coalitions.

== Political career ==
In the 2013 Malaysian general election, Seah was nominated to contest for the Teluk Intan federal seat and he defeated President of the Parti Gerakan Rakyat Malaysia (GERAKAN) Mah Siew Keong of Barisan Nasional (BN).

== Election results ==
Perak State Legislative Assembly
Year	Constituency	Candidate	Votes	Pct	Opponent(s)	Votes	Pct	Ballots cast	Majority	Turnout
1999	N49 Pasir Bedamar	Seah Leong Peng (DAP)	12,416	61.21%	Teiw Book Toh (PPP)	7,378	36.37%	20,285	5,038	62.62%
2004	N55 Pasir Bedamar	Seah Leong Peng (DAP)	11,050	57.65%	Lee Heng (PPP)	7,659	39.96%	19,168	3,391	64.94%
2008	N55 Pasir Bedamar	Seah Leong Peng (DAP)	13,655	69.05%	Lee Heng (MCA)	5,741	29.03%	19,777	7,914	68.80%

Parliament of Malaysia
Year	Constituency	Candidate	Votes	Pct	Opponent(s)	Votes	Pct	Ballots cast	Majority	Turnout
2013	P076 Telok Intan	Seah Leong Peng (DAP)	27,399	56.10%	Mah Siew Keong (Gerakan)	20,086	41.13%	48,839	7,313	80.75%
2013	P076 Telok Intan	Seah Leong Peng (DAP)	27,399	56.10%	Moralingam Kannan (IND)	279	0.57%	48,839	7,313	80.75%

== Death ==
He died on 1 May 2014 due to bladder cancer in University Malaya Medical Centre. After his death, a by-election was held on 31 May 2014 to choose a new Member of Parliament.

== See also ==
- Teluk Intan (federal constituency)
- Pasir Bedamar (state constituency)
- 2014 Telok Intan by-election
