= M. Kayveas =

Malaysian politician

Yang Berbahagia Tan Sri Datuk Seri M Kayveas PSM SMW PJN JP
- எம் கேவியஸ்
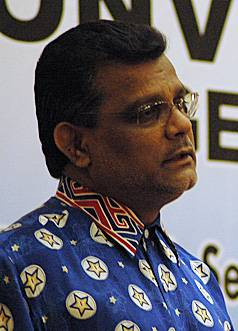

Member of the Malaysian Parliament for Taiping
- In office 21 March 2004 – 8 March 2008
- Preceded by: Kerk Choo Ting (BN–Gerakan)
- Succeeded by: Nga Kor Ming (PR–DAP)
- Majority: 2,172 (2004)

President of People's Progressive Party
- In office 1993–2018
- Preceded by: S. I. Rajah
- Succeeded by: Maglin Dennis D'Cruz

Personal details
- Born: 29 April 1954 (age 72) Benta Estate, Kuala Lipis, Pahang, Federation of Malaya (now Malaysia)
- Citizenship: Malaysian
- Party: MyPPP
- Other political affiliations: Barisan Nasional (until 2018)
- Spouse: Blanche Olbery
- Children: Marsella Kayveas, Yasheena Kayveas, Mikhaerl Kayveas and Mikhryan Kayveas
- Education: University of Buckingham
- Occupation: Politician, flight attendant
- Website: www.kayveas.com

M. Kayveas (Tamil: எம் கேவியஸ், romanized: Em kēviyas; born 29 April 1954) is a Malaysian politician. He was also the president of the People's Progressive Party (MyPPP) and formerly a special advisor to the former minister of transport Liow Tiong Lai. He was formerly a deputy minister in the prime minister's department.

He was the member of Parliament for Taiping constituency, until losing in the 2008 Malaysian General Election to Nga Kor Ming a candidate from the opposition Democratic Action Party (DAP). Previously, he was a senator in the Malaysian bicameral parliament and a deputy minister of housing and local government.

== Background ==
Kayveas was born on 29 April 1954, in Benta Estate, Kuala Lipis, Pahang, Malaysia. He is married to Blanche Olbery, formerly a Malaysian ambassador to Republic of Finland, and has four children, Marsella Kayveas, Yasheena Kayveas, Mikhaerl Kayveas and Mikhryan Kayveas.

Kayveas was a flight attendant with Malaysia Airlines.

In 1993, Kayveas became president of People's Progressive Party (PPP), a component member of the ruling coalition Barisan Nasional, and is the longest serving PPP president to date. He was credited for putting the PPP on a strong footing after many years of internal strife within the party. Membership of the PPP in the coalition was suspended from 1988 until 1993. When Kayveas started restructuring the party and brought it back to the coalition in 1994, many old timers who caused the party's internal squabbles wanted to take back the helm and push Kayveas out. However, he emerged victorious and worked on growing the party and regaining its past glory. Today, the PPP is 574,000 strong with a network of over 3700 branches throughout the country. The restructure started with Kayveas himself having a membership card signed by the secretary-general as #000001 and all subsequent cards are personally signed by Kayveas as president himself. It is also understood that the Malaysian Book of Records is notified and it would be registered as the most number of signature of sorts.

== Personal life ==
Kayveas who was formerly known as K.V.S ( K.V. Supramaniam ) was a born Hindu. Kayveas is a graduate from University of Buckingham, Buckingham, England.

== Former Deputy Minister ==
Kayveas was a deputy minister in the prime minister's department, which is a ministry by itself. Kayveas previous responsibilities as a deputy minister includes:

- Pardon's Board
- Attorney General's Chambers
- Legal Affairs Division
- Legal Aid Bureau
- AmanahRaya
- KL Regional Centre for Arbitration
- Department of Insolvency Malaysia
- Office of the Chief Registrar of the Federal Court

== Controversy ==
In July 2007, Kayveas was alleged to have mentioned an ultimatum to leave the Barisan Nasional coalition if the ISA is not amended and his party is not given any allocation of seats in the next general election. He later clarified that there was no such thing as an ultimatum but simply stating the PPP's stand and made a 'friendly request' on the seats.

== Election results ==
Perak State Legislative Assembly
| Year | Constituency | Candidate | Votes | Pct | Opponent(s) | Votes | Pct | Ballots cast | Majority | Turnout |
|---|---|---|---|---|---|---|---|---|---|---|
| 2013 | N55 Pasir Bedamar | M. Kayveas (PPP) | 5,823 | 23.26% | Terence Naidu (DAP) | 18,860 | 75.35% | 25,031 | 13,037 | 79.70% |

Parliament of Malaysia
| Year | Constituency | Candidate | Votes | Pct | Opponent(s) | Votes | Pct | Ballots cast | Majority | Turnout |
|---|---|---|---|---|---|---|---|---|---|---|
| 2004 | P060 Taiping | M. Kayveas (PPP) | 20,129 | 47.41% | Ong Chee Keng (DAP) | 17,957 | 42.29% | 44,821 | 2,172 | 68.91% |
| 2004 | P060 Taiping | M. Kayveas (PPP) | 20,129 | 47.41% | Annah Dorai Pakiri (PKR) | 4,371 | 10.30% | 44,821 | 2,172 | 68.91% |
| 2008 | P060 Taiping | M. Kayveas (PPP) | 16,800 | 35.65% | Nga Kor Ming (DAP) | 28,098 | 59.63% | 47,123 | 11,298 | 71.52% |
| 2022 | P065 Ipoh Barat | M. Kayveas (IND) | 378 | 0.48% | M. Kulasegaran (DAP) | 63,915 | 81.57% | 78,356 | 56,667 | 68.34% |
| 2022 | P065 Ipoh Barat | M. Kayveas (IND) | 378 | 0.48% | Low Guo Nan (MCA) | 7,248 | 9.25% | 78,356 | 56,667 | 68.34% |
| 2022 | P065 Ipoh Barat | M. Kayveas (IND) | 378 | 0.48% | Chek Kwong Weng (Gerakan) | 6,815 | 8.70% | 78,356 | 56,667 | 68.34% |

== Honour ==
=== Honour of Malaysia ===
- Malaysia
  - Commander of the Order of Meritorious Service (PJN) – Datuk (1996)
  - Commander of the Order of Loyalty to the Crown of Malaysia (PSM) – Tan Sri (2014)
- Federal Territory (Malaysia)
  - Grand Commander of the Order of the Territorial Crown (SMW) – Datuk Seri (2011)
