= Terence Naidu =

Malaysian politician and lawyer

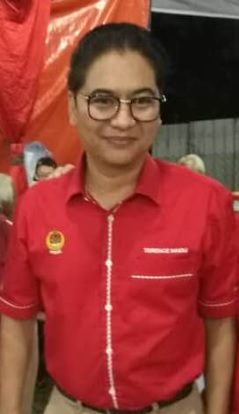
- Terence Naidu

Member of the Perak State Legislative Assembly for Pasir Bedamar
- In office 5 May 2013 – 19 November 2022
- Preceded by: Seah Leong Peng (PR–DAP)
- Succeeded by: Woo Kah Leong (PH–DAP)
- Majority: 13,037 (2013); 14,520 (2018)

Faction represented in Perak State Legislative Assembly
- 2013–2018: Democratic Action Party
- 2018–2022: Pakatan Harapan

Personal details
- Born: Terence Naidu A/L V Raja @ Raja Naidu; 15 September 1968 (age 58) Teluk Intan, Perak, Malaysia
- Party: Democratic Action Party (DAP)
- Other political affiliations: Pakatan Rakyat (PR) (2008–2015); Pakatan Harapan (PH) (since 2015)
- Education: International Islamic University Malaysia; University of Wolverhampton
- Occupation: Politician
- Profession: Lawyer

Terence Naidu (born 15 September 1968) is a Malaysian politician and lawyer who served as Member of the Perak State Legislative Assembly (MLA) for Pasir Bedamar from May 2013 to November 2022. He is a member of the Democratic Action Party (DAP), a component party of the Pakatan Harapan (PH) and formerly Pakatan Rakyat (PR) coalitions.

== Prior to political career (before 2013) ==
He hailed from the state of Perak. He was a career lawyer and a graduate from the University of Wolverhampton (Bachelor of Laws 1992) who finished his Certificate of Legal Practise in 1994. He was admitted as an Advocate and Solicitor (High Court of Malaya) in 1995 and further received his Diploma in the field of Syariah Law (International Islamic University).

== Political career (2013–present) ==
He was seen as the underdog when he first contested the 2013 general election on a DAP ticket in the state seat of Pasir Bedamar in the federal seat of Teluk Intan against then President of the People's Progressive Party (myPPP) M. Kayveas. He went on to win the state seat by garnering 18,860 votes with a majority of 13,037 against the Kayveas who only garnered 5,823 votes. He was renominated by DAP to defend the Pasir Bedamar state seat in the 2018 general election and went on to successfully defend it by defeating his opponents Kong Sun Chin (Branch Deputy Chairman of the Malaysian Chinese Association (MCA) of Teluk Intan) and S. Kumaresan (Malaysian Islamic Party (PAS)) . He secured 19,480 votes against Kong (4,960 votes) and Kumaresan (939 votes). Terence is also a member of the state executive committee (EXCO) of DAP of Perak after being named as a co-opted EXCO member in the Perak DAP state party convention on 14 October 2018.

== Controversies ==
=== Not paying summons ===
He successfully defended a landmark case against himself brought against him by The Municipal Council of Teluk Intan when they charged him with Clause 20(1) of the Hilir Perak District Council's Road Transport Order (Parking Bylaw) 1997 for not paying his summons. He was found to have parked his car without feeding the parking meter. His argument was ruled in his favour by Majistrate D. Sunita Kaur Jessy when he argued that it was due to a faulty meter which did not register his payment and no receipt was issued by the attendants responsible for it. The ruling meant that unregistered payment through faulty meters can also be found accordingly.

=== Drug usage ===
On 13 January 2022, he was arrested and detained by the police for testing positive for illegal substances in a nightclub in Penang. He was later released from custody a day after he was detained. On 20 April 2022, he was charged for consuming methamphetamine.

== Election results ==
Perak State Legislative Assembly
Year	Constituency	Candidate	Votes	Pct	Opponent(s)	Votes	Pct	Ballots cast	Majority	Turnout
2013	N55 Pasir Bedamar	Terence Naidu (DAP)	18,860	75.35%	M. Kayveas (PPP)	5,823	23.26%	25,031	13,037	79.70%
2018	N55 Pasir Bedamar	Terence Naidu (DAP)	19,480	62.00%	Kong Sun Chin (MCA)	4,960	16.00%	25,379	14,520	81.44%
2018	N55 Pasir Bedamar	Terence Naidu (DAP)	19,480	62.00%	Kumaresan Shanmugam (PAS)	939	3.00%	25,379	14,520	81.44%
