= Mohd Azhar Jamaluddin =

Malaysian politician

Yang Berbahagia Dato' Mohd Azhar Jamaluddin DPMP AMP PPN
- محمد ازهر جمال الدين

Member of the Perak State Legislative Assembly for Changkat Jong
- In office 5 May 2013 – 19 November 2022
- Preceded by: Mohd Anuar Sudin (PR–PAS)
- Succeeded by: Nadziruddin Mohamed Bandi (PN–BERSATU)
- Majority: 1,118 (2013); 67 (2018)

Personal details
- Born: Mohd Azhar bin Jamaluddin
- Citizenship: Malaysian
- Party: UMNO
- Other political affiliations: Barisan Nasional
- Occupation: Politician

Mohd Azhar bin Jamaluddin is a Malaysian politician from UMNO. He was the member of the Perak State Legislative Assembly for Changkat Jong from 2013 to 2022.

== Politics ==
He is the Chairman of UMNO Teluk Intan Branch and the Chairman of Teluk Intan Community College Advisor Committee.

== Election results ==
Perak State Legislative Assembly
Year	Constituency	Candidate	Votes	Pct	Opponent(s)	Votes	Pct	Ballots cast	Majority	Turnout
2013	N56 Changkat Jong	Mohd Azhar Jamaluddin (UMNO)	12,065	51.82%	Mohd Anuar Sudin (PAS)	10,947	47.02%	23,808	1,118	81.90%
2013	N56 Changkat Jong	Mohd Azhar Jamaluddin (UMNO)	12,065	51.82%	Suppan Krishnan (IND)	269	1.16%	23,808	1,118	81.90%
2018	N56 Changkat Jong	Mohd Azhar Jamaluddin (UMNO)	11,216	39.77%	Mohd Faizul Mohd Ismail (BERSATU)	11,149	39.54%	28,893	67	82.44%
2018	N56 Changkat Jong	Mohd Azhar Jamaluddin (UMNO)	11,216	39.77%	Mohd Azhar Mohd Rafiei (PAS)	5,834	20.69%	28,893	67	82.44%
2022	N56 Changkat Jong	Mohd Azhar Jamaluddin (UMNO)	11,044	30.07%	Nadziruddin Mohamed Bandi (BERSATU)	13,232	36.02%	37,309	1,087	76.36%
2022	N56 Changkat Jong	Mohd Azhar Jamaluddin (UMNO)	11,044	30.07%	Badrul Hisham Badarudin (DAP)	12,145	33.06%	37,309	1,087	76.36%
2022	N56 Changkat Jong	Mohd Azhar Jamaluddin (UMNO)	11,044	30.07%	Muhammad Amirul Mahfuz (PEJUANG)	312	0.85%	37,309	1,087	76.36%

== Honours ==
- Malaysia
  - Medal of the Order of the Defender of the Realm (PPN) (2007)
- Perak
  - Knight Commander of the Order of the Perak State Crown (DPMP) – Dato' (2014)
  - Member of the Order of the Perak State Crown (AMP) (2003)

== See also ==
- Perak Football Association
