= Simpang Renggam (federal constituency) =

Federal constituency in Johor, Malaysia

Simpang Renggam (P151)
Johor constituency

Federal constituency
- Legislature: Dewan Rakyat
- MP: Hasni Mohammad; BN
- Constituency created: 2003
- First contested: 2004
- Last contested: 2022

Demographics
- Population (2020): 76,286
- Electors (2026): 60,387
- Area (km²): 751
- Pop. density (per km²): 101.6

Simpang Renggam is a federal constituency in Kluang District, Johor, Malaysia, that has been represented in the Dewan Rakyat since 2004.

The federal constituency was created in the 2003 redistribution and is mandated to return a single member to the Dewan Rakyat under the first past the post voting system.

== Demographics ==
Ethnic breakdown of Simpang Renggam's electorate as of 2022
1. Malay (62.8%)
2. Chinese (28.8%)
3. Indian (8.10%)
4. Other ethnicities (0.30%)

As of 2020, Simpang Renggam has a population of 76,286 people.

Age breakdown of Simpang Renggam's electorate as of 2022
1. 18-20 (5.92%)
2. 21-29 (21.2%)
3. 30-39 (22.2%)
4. 40-49 (16.6%)
5. 50-59 (14.9%)
6. 60-69 (11.0%)
7. 70-79 (5.53%)
8. 80-89 (2.16%)
9. above 90 (0.42%)
Gender breakdown of Simpang Renggam's electorate as of 2022
1. Male (50.0%)
2. Female (50.0%)

== History ==
=== Polling districts ===
According to the federal gazette issued on 2 July 2026, the Simpang Renggam constituency has a total of 26 polling districts.

State constituency	Polling District	Code	Location
Machap (N26)	Sri Desa	151/26/01	Balai Raya Kampung Sri Desa
Machap (N26)	Rancangan FELDA Ayer Hitam	151/26/02	SK LKTP Ayer Hitam
Machap (N26)	Sri Lalang	151/26/03	SK Seri Lalang
Machap (N26)	Pekan Machap	151/26/04	SJK (C) Machap
Machap (N26)	Machap	151/26/05	SK Seri Machap
Machap (N26)	Kampong Ulu Benut	151/26/06	SK Seri Kencana
Machap (N26)	Bandar Simpang Renggam Utara	151/26/07	SJK (C) Tuan Poon
Machap (N26)	Bandar Simpang Renggam Timor	151/26/08	SK Simpang Renggam
Machap (N26)	Simpang Renggam	151/26/09	SMK Dato' Abdul Rahman Andak; SMK Simpang Renggam
Machap (N26)	FELCRA Simpang Renggam	151/26/10	SK Bukit Kenangan
Machap (N26)	Jalan Benut	151/26/11	SK Dato' Ibrahim Majid
Machap (N26)	Ladang Nenas	151/26/12	SK Sungai Linau
Layang-Layang (N27)	Ladang Tun Dr. Ismail	151/27/01	SK Ladang Tun Dr. Ismail
Layang-Layang (N27)	Kampong Chokro	151/27/02	SA Kompleks Penghulu Simpang Renggam
Layang-Layang (N27)	Kampong Sahari	151/27/03	SR Islam As Syddiq
Layang-Layang (N27)	Senda	151/27/04	SMK Dato' Hj. Hassan Yunos
Layang-Layang (N27)	Bandar Renggam	151/27/05	SJK (C) Chin Chiang
Layang-Layang (N27)	Kebun Bahru	151/27/06	SK Jubli Intan
Layang-Layang (N27)	Sembrong	151/27/07	SJK (T) Ladang Sembrong
Layang-Layang (N27)	Chemara	151/27/08	SJK (T) Ulu Remis
Layang-Layang (N27)	Layang-Layang	151/27/09	SA Pekan Layang-Layang
Layang-Layang (N27)	Bandar Layang-Layang Selatan	151/27/10	SJK (C) Layang-Layang; SK Pekan Layang-Layang
Layang-Layang (N27)	Bandar Layang-Layang Utara	151/27/11	SJK (C) Layang
Layang-Layang (N27)	Renggam	151/27/12	SK Seri Kg. Renggam
Layang-Layang (N27)	Ladang Southern Malay	151/27/13	SJK (T) Ladang Southern Malay
Layang-Layang (N27)	FELDA Layang-Layang	151/27/14	SK (Felda) Layang-Layang

=== Representation history ===
Members of Parliament for Simpang Renggam
Parliament	No	Years	Member	Party	Vote Share
Constituency created, renamed from Sungai Benut
11th	P151	2004–2008	Kerk Choo Ting (郭洙镇)	BN (GERAKAN)	18,997; 79.69%
12th	P151	2008–2013	Liang Teck Meng (梁德明)	BN (GERAKAN)	16,450; 65.68%
13th	P151	2013–2018	Liang Teck Meng (梁德明)	BN (GERAKAN)	19,754; 58.44%
14th	P151	2018–2020	Maszlee Malik (مزلي بن مالک)	PH (BERSATU)	18,157; 50.68%
14th	P151	2020	Maszlee Malik (مزلي بن مالک)	BERSATU	18,157; 50.68%
14th	P151	2020	Maszlee Malik (مزلي بن مالک)	Independent	18,157; 50.68%
14th	P151	2020–2021	Maszlee Malik (مزلي بن مالک)	Independent	18,157; 50.68%
14th	P151	2021–2022	Maszlee Malik (مزلي بن مالک)	PH (PKR)	18,157; 50.68%
15th	P151	2022–present	Hasni Mohammad (حسني محمد)	BN (UMNO)	18,312; 41.19%

=== State constituency ===
Parliamentary constituency	State constituency						
Parliamentary constituency	1954–59*	1959–1974	1974–1986	1986–1995	1995–2004	2004–2018	2018–present
Simpang Renggam						Machap	
Simpang Renggam						Layang-Layang	

=== Historical boundaries ===
State Constituency	Area	
State Constituency	2003	2018
Machap	Kampung Melayu Bukit Nyamuk; Kampung Paya; Kampung Sungai Linau; Machap; Simpang Renggam	
Layang-Layang	Bukit Benut; FELDA Layang-Layang; Kampung Chokro; Layang-Layang; Renggam	

=== Current state assembly members ===
No.	State Constituency	Member	Coalition (Party)
N26	Machap	Onn Hafiz Ghazi	BN (UMNO)
N27	Layang-Layang	Chua Jian Boon	BN (MCA)

=== Local governments & postcodes ===
No.	State Constituency	Local Government	Postcode
N26	Machap	Kluang Municipal Council (Sri Lalang area); Simpang Renggam District Council	81850 Layang-Layang; 86000 Kluang; 86100 Ayer Hitam; 86200 Simpang Renggam; 86300 Renggam
N27	Layang-Layang	Simpang Renggam District Council	81850 Layang-Layang; 86000 Kluang; 86100 Ayer Hitam; 86200 Simpang Renggam; 86300 Renggam

== Election results ==
Malaysian general election, 2022
Party	Candidate	Votes	%	∆%
BN	Hasni Mohammad	18,312	41.19	▲0.20
PH	Maszlee Malik	16,491	37.37	▲37.37
PN	Mohd Fazrul Kamat	9,077	20.57	▲20.57
PEJUANG	Kamal Kusmin	251	0.57	▲0.57
Total valid votes		44,131	100.00	
Total rejected ballots		538		
Unreturned ballots		132		
Turnout		44,801	74.76	▼8.64
Registered electors		59,033		
Majority		1,821	3.82	▼5.87
BN gain from PKR		Swing		?
Source(s) https://lom.agc.gov.my/ilims/upload/portal/akta/outputp/1753254/PUB%20617%20PARLIMEN%20JOHOR.pdf

Malaysian general election, 2018
Party	Candidate	Votes	%	∆%
PKR	Maszlee Malik	18,157	50.68	▲50.68
BN	Liang Teck Meng	14,682	40.99	▼17.45
PAS	Mohd Jubri Selamat	2,983	8.33	▼33.23
Total valid votes		35,822	100.00	
Total rejected ballots		779		
Unreturned ballots		94		
Turnout		36,695	83.40	▲8.82
Registered electors		43,998		
Majority		3,475	9.69	▼21.67
PKR gain from BN		Swing		?
Source(s) "His Majesty's Government Gazette - Notice of Contested Election, Parliament for the State of Johore [P.U. (B) 244/2018]" (PDF). Attorney General's Chambers of Malaysia. 3 May 2018. "Federal Government Gazette - Results of Contested Election and Statements of the Poll after the Official Addition of Votes, Parliamentary Constituencies for the State of Johore [P.U. (B) 318/2018]" (PDF). Attorney General's Chambers of Malaysia. 28 May 2018.

Malaysian general election, 2013
Party	Candidate	Votes	%	∆%
BN	Liang Teck Meng	19,754	58.44	▼7.24
PAS	Suhaizan Kayat	14,048	41.56	▲7.24
Total valid votes		33,802	100.00	
Total rejected ballots		868		
Unreturned ballots		84		
Turnout		34,754	86.58	▲12.00
Registered electors		40,143		
Majority		5,706	16.88	▼14.48
BN hold		Swing		
Source(s) "Federal Government Gazette - Notice of Contested Election, Parliament for the State of Johore [P.U. (B) 181/2013]" (PDF). Attorney General's Chambers of Malaysia. 26 April 2013. "Federal Government Gazette - Results of Contested Election and Statements of the Poll after the Official Addition of Votes, Parliamentary Constituencies for the State of Johore [P.U. (B) 222/2013]" (PDF). Attorney General's Chambers of Malaysia. 22 May 2013.

Malaysian general election, 2008
Party	Candidate	Votes	%	∆%
BN	Liang Teck Meng	16,450	65.68	▼14.01
PAS	Atan Gombang	8,597	34.32	▲14.01
Total valid votes		25,047	100.00	
Total rejected ballots		924		
Unreturned ballots		27		
Turnout		25,998	74.58	▲1.89
Registered electors		34,859		
Majority		7,853	31.36	▼28.02
BN hold		Swing		

Malaysian general election, 2004
Party	Candidate	Votes	∆%
BN	Kerk Kim Tim @ Kerk Choo Ting	18,997	79.69
PAS	Atan Gombang	4,842	20.31
Total valid votes		23,839	100.00
Total rejected ballots		907	
Unreturned ballots		142	
Turnout		24,888	72.69
Registered electors		34,240	
Majority		14,155	59.38
This was a new constituency created.
