= 1961 Telok Anson by-election =

- 30 May 1961

P055 Telok Anson seat in Dewan Rakyat
- Turnout: 21,199
	First party	Second party	Third party
	IND	All	IND
Candidate	Too Joon Hing	Wah Keng Jooi	Abdul Rashid Nanek @ Mak Fie Hoong
Party	Independent	MCA	Independent
Alliance		Alliance
Popular vote	11,943	8,787	274
Percentage	56.86	41.83	1.30
MP before election
Woo Saik Hong
Alliance (MCA)
Elected MP
Too Joon Hing
Independent

The Telok Anson by-election was a parliamentary by-election that was held on 30 May 1961 in the state of Perak in the Federation of Malaya. The Telok Anson seat fell vacant following the death of its MCA MP Woo Saik Hong, which won the seat in 1959 Malayan general election with a majority of 4,040 votes.

Former MCA Secretary general then turn Independent politician Too Joon Hing, won the by election, defeating Wah Keng Jooi of Alliance and another Independent candidate Abdul Rashid Nanek @ Mak Fie Hoong with a majority of 3,156 votes.

== Nomination ==
On nomination day, three candidates were confirmed. Alliance nominated MCA candidate, Wah Keng Jooi. Two Independent politician, former secretary general of MCA Too Joon Hing and former PPP leader Abdul Rashid Nanek @ Mak Fie Hoong completed the roundout. Joon Hing were supported by People's Progressive Party.

The real battle was between Mr Wah and Mr Toh which both were prominent Hainanese leader.

== Results ==
Malaysian general by-election, 30 May 1961: Telok Anson Upon the death of incumbent, Woo Saik Hong
Party	Candidate	Votes	%	∆%
Independent	Too Joon Hing	11,943	56.86	▲56.86
Alliance	Wah Keng Jooi	8,787	41.83	▼21.98
Independent	Abdul Rashid Nanek @ Mak Fie Hoong	274	1.30	▲1.30
Total valid votes		21,004	100.00	
Total rejected ballots		195		
Unreturned ballots		0		
Turnout		21,199		
Registered electors				
Majority		3,156	34.88	▲7.26
Independent gain from Alliance		Swing		?
