= Woo Kah Leong =

Malaysian politician and lawyer

Yang Berhormat Tuan Woo Kah Leong MLA
- 吴家良
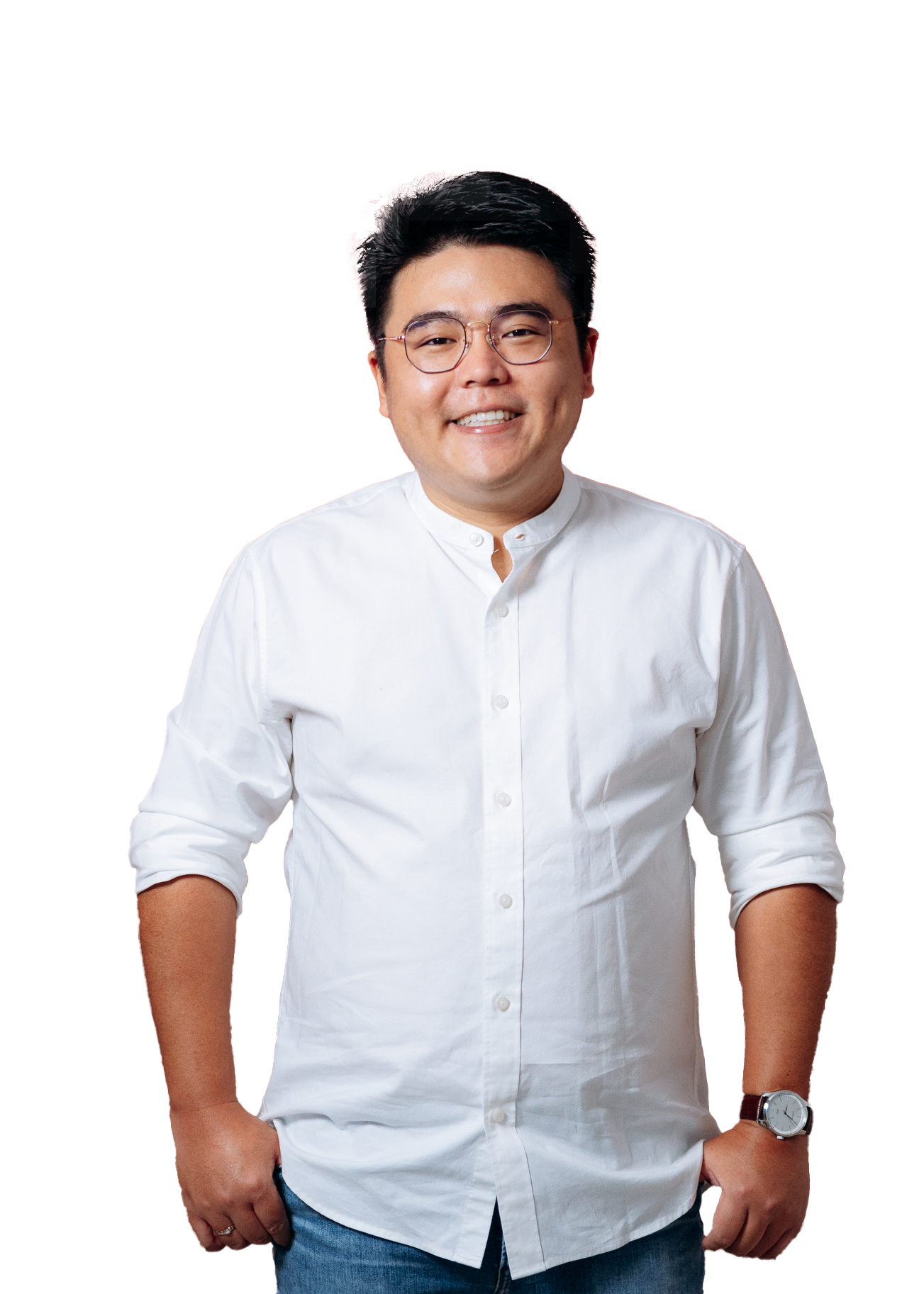

Member of the Perak State Executive Council (Domestic Trade, Cooperatives, Consumer Affairs & Chinese New Villages : since 23 November 2022) (Note: Assumed portfolios on 23 November 2022.)
- Incumbent
- Assumed office 22 November 2022
- Monarch: Nazrin Shah
- Menteri Besar: Saarani Mohamad
- Preceded by: Abdul Yunus Jamahri (Domestic Trade & Consumer Affairs); Zainol Fadzi Paharudin (Cooperatives); Portfolio established (Chinese New Villages)
- Constituency: Pasir Bedamar

Member of the Perak State Legislative Assembly for Pasir Bedamar
- Incumbent
- Assumed office 19 November 2022
- Preceded by: Terence Naidu (PH–DAP)
- Majority: 17,446 (2022)

6th Youth Chief of the Pakatan Harapan
- Incumbent
- Assumed office 11 March 2025
- President: Wan Azizah Wan Ismail
- Deputy: Adam Adli; Mohd Hasbie Muda; Felix Joseph Saang
- Chairman: Anwar Ibrahim
- Preceded by: Kelvin Yii Lee Wuen

Youth Chief of the Democratic Action Party
- Incumbent
- Assumed office 17 November 2024
- Deputy: Wayne Ong Chun Wei
- Secretary-General: Anthony Loke Siew Fook
- Preceded by: Kelvin Yii Lee Wuen

Personal details
- Born: Woo Kah Leong; 3 March 1991 (age 35) Kampong Baru Pasir Bedamar, Teluk Intan, Perak, Malaysia
- Citizenship: Malaysian
- Party: Democratic Action Party (DAP)
- Other political affiliations: Pakatan Harapan (PH)
- Education: San Min National Type Secondary School
- Alma mater: University of Malaya (LLB)
- Occupation: Politician
- Profession: Lawyer

Woo Kah Leong

Chinese name
- Traditional Chinese: 吳家良
- Simplified Chinese: 吴家良
Transcriptions
Standard Mandarin
- Hanyu Pinyin: Wú Jiāliáng

Woo Kah Leong (simplified Chinese: 吴家良; traditional Chinese: 吳家良; pinyin: Wú Jiā Liáng; born 3 March 1991) is a Malaysian politician and lawyer who has served as Member of the Perak State Executive Council (EXCO) in the Barisan Nasional (BN) state administration under Menteri Besar Saarani Mohamad and Member of the Perak State Legislative Assembly (MLA) for Pasir Bedamar since November 2022. He is a member of the Democratic Action Party (DAP), a component party of the Pakatan Harapan (PH) coalition. He has served as the 6th Youth Chief of PH since March 2025 and the Youth Chief of DAP or known as the Chief of the Youth Wing of DAP namely the DAP Socialist Youth (DAPSY) since November 2024. He is also presently the youngest Perak EXCO Member and was the Youth Publicity Secretary of DAP or known as the Publicity Secretary of the Youth Wing of DAP namely the DAP Socialist Youth (DAPSY) to his promotion to the Youth Chief in November 2024.

== Background ==
Woo was born in the Kampong Baru Pasir Bedamar, Teluk Intan, Perak in year 1991. He attended his secondary school in SMJK San Min, Teluk Intan, and continued his tertiary study at the University of Malaya for the course of Bachelor of Law (LLB.). Upon the completion of his study, Woo worked as a Legal Associate at the A M Ong & Partners before stepping into the political arena.

== Political career ==
=== Member of the Perak State Executive Council (since 2022) ===
The 2022 Perak state election elected a hung assembly. Barisan Nasional (BN) later returned to power by forming a coalition state government with PH. Following that, Kota Tampan MLA Saarani of BN was reappointed the Menteri Besar. Woo was appointed the Perak EXCO Member in charge of Domestic Trade, Consumer Affairs, Cooperatives and Chinese New Villages by Menteri Besar Saarani.

=== Member of the Perak State Legislative Assembly (since 2022) ===
==== 2022 Perak state election ====
In the 2022 Perak state election, Woo made his electoral debut after being nominated by PH to contest the Pasir Bedamar state seat. Woo won the seat and was elected to the Perak State Legislative Assembly as the Pasir Bedamar MLA after defeating Kong Sun Chin of BN and Suriyanarayanan Sannasy Naidu of Perikatan Nasional (PN) by a majority of 17,446 votes.

== Election results ==
Perak State Legislative Assembly
Year	Constituency	Candidate	Votes	Pct	Opponent(s)	Votes	Pct	Ballots cast	Majority	Turnout
2022	N55 Pasir Bedamar	Woo Kah Leong (DAP)	21,061	76.64%	Kong Sun Chin (MCA)	3,615	13.16%	27,479	17,446	70.25%
2022	N55 Pasir Bedamar	Woo Kah Leong (DAP)	21,061	76.64%	Suriyanarayanan Sannasy Naidu (PAS)	2,803	10.20%	27,479	17,446	70.25%
