= 2014 Telok Intan by-election =

- 31 May 2014

Constituency of Teluk Intan in the Dewan Rakyat
- Turnout: 67.39% (▼13.36%)
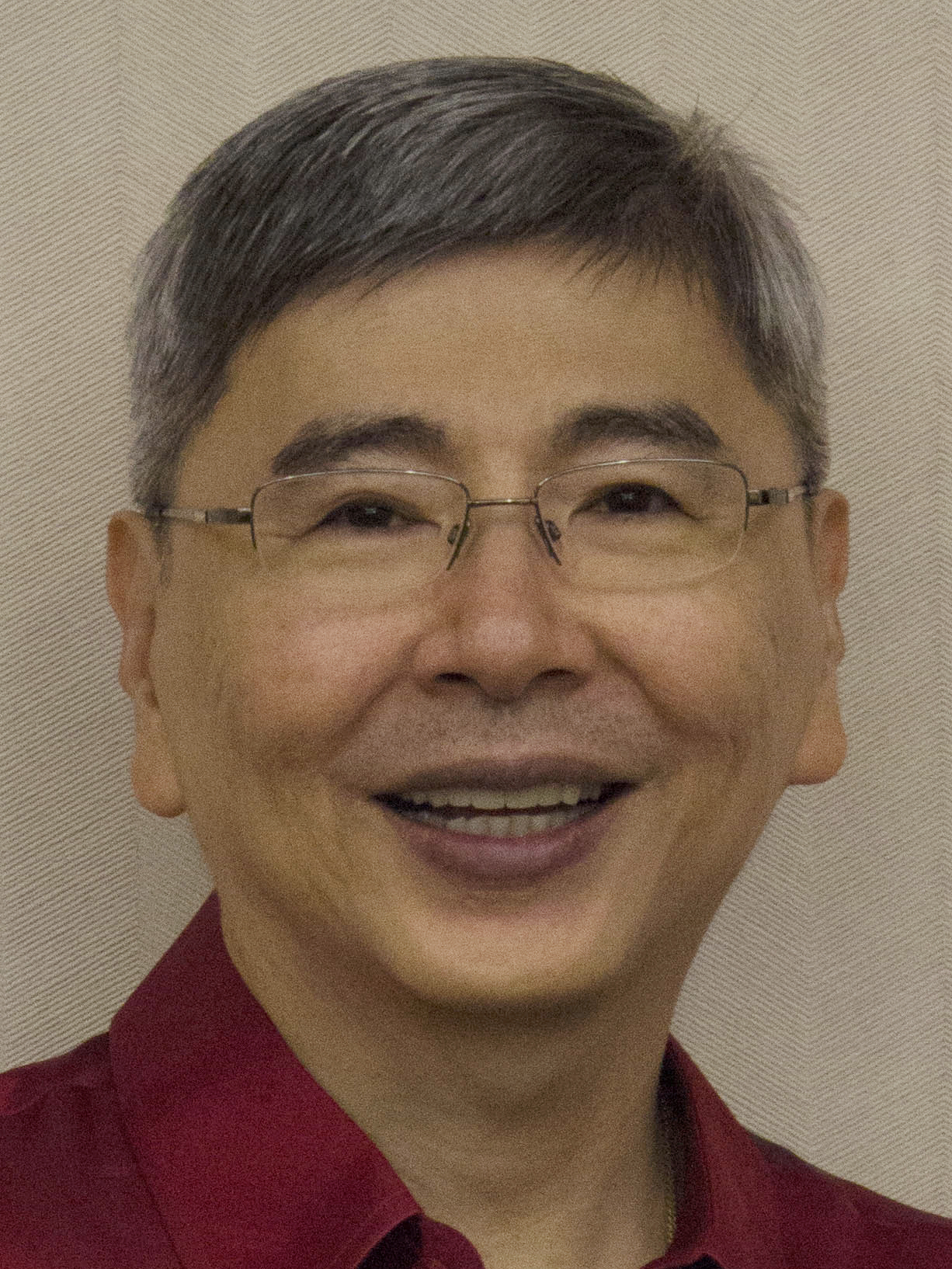

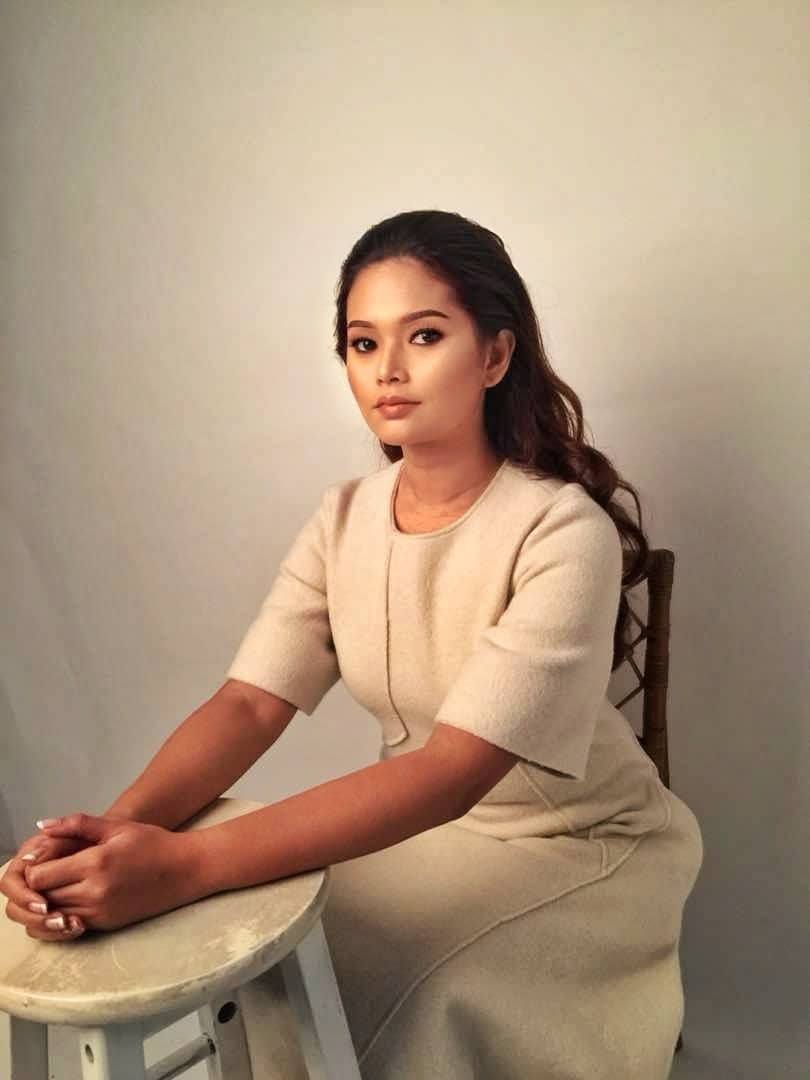
Candidate	Mah Siew Keong	Dyana Sofya Mohd Daud
Party	BN (Gerakan)	DAP
Alliance		PR
Popular vote	20,157	19,919
Percentage	50.30%	49.70%
Swing	▲8.24%	▼7.66%
MP before election
Seah Leong Peng
DAP
Subsequent MP
Mah Siew Keong
BN

A by-election was held for the Dewan Rakyat parliamentary seat of Telok Intan on 31 May 2014 following the nomination day on 19 May 2014. The seat was vacated after the death of the incumbent MP, Seah Leong Peng from bladder cancer in Kuala Lumpur on 1 May 2014. Seah was a lawmaker from the Democratic Action Party (DAP), a component party of Pakatan Rakyat (PR) coalition. In the 2013 general election, he defeated Barisan Nasional(BN) candidate and Gerakan president Mah Siew Keong and an independent candidate by 7,313 votes.

The PR candidate in the by-election was DAP's Dyana Sofya Mohd Daud, notable for her status as a rare Malay politician in the DAP. On 17 May 2014, BN announced that it would again field Mah Siew Keong. 60,349 voters were eligible to vote in the by-election.

== Results ==
Mah Siew Keong won the election by a slim majority of 238 votes.

Malaysian general by-election, 31 May 2014: Telok Intan Upon the death of incumbent, Seah Leong Peng
Party	Candidate	Votes	%	∆%
BN	Mah Siew Keong	20,157	50.30	+ 8.24
DAP	Dyana Sofya Mohd Daud	19,919	49.70	7.66
Total valid votes		40,076	100.00	
Total rejected ballots		543		
Unreturned ballots		49		
Turnout		40,668	67.39	
Registered electors		60,349		
Majority		238	0.60	
BN gain from DAP		Swing		0.58
Source(s) "Pilihan Raya Kecil P.076 Telok Intan". Election Commission of Malaysia. Archived from the original on 2018-09-20. "Federal Government Gazette - Notice of Contested Election - By-election of the Dewan Rakyat of P.076 Telok Intan for the State of Perak [P.U. (B) 220/2014]" (PDF). Attorney General's Chambers of Malaysia. 19 May 2014. "P. U. (B) 275/2014 Federal Government Gazette - Results of Contested Election and Statement of the Poll after the Official Addition of Votes for the By-election of P.076 Telok Intan" (PDF). Attorney General's Chambers of Malaysia. 3 June 2014.
