= Pasir Bedamar =

Constituency in Malaysia

Pasir Bedamar (N55)
Perak constituency

State constituency
- Legislature: Perak State Legislative Assembly
MLA
Woo Kah Leong
PH
- Constituency created: 1959
- First contested: 1959
- Last contested: 2022

Demographics
- Electors (2022): 39,117

Pasir Bedamar is a state constituency in Perak, Malaysia, that has been represented in the Perak State Legislative Assembly.

This constituency mandated to return a single member to the Perak State Legislative Assembly under the first past the post voting system.

== Demographics ==
Ethnic breakdown of Pasir Bedamar's electorate as of 2018
1. Chinese (68.4%)
2. Malay (16.7%)
3. Indian (14.4%)
4. Other ethnicities (0.55%)

== History ==
=== Polling districts ===
According to the federal gazette issued on 30 March 2018, the Pasir Bedamar constituency is divided into 19 polling districts.

State constituency	Polling District	Code	Location
Pasir Bedamar（N55）	Sungai Suli	076/55/01	SJK (C) Chung Hwa
Pasir Bedamar（N55）	Sungai Temah	076/55/02	SJK (T) Ladang Sungai Timah
Pasir Bedamar（N55）	Pasir Bedamar Barat	076/55/03	SJK (C) San Min 1; SJK (C) San Min 2
Pasir Bedamar（N55）	Pasir Bedamar Utara	076/55/04	SJK (C) San Min 1; SJK (C) San Min 2
Pasir Bedamar（N55）	Pasir Bedamar Tengah	076/55/05	SJK (C) Phooi Yong
Pasir Bedamar（N55）	Pasir Bedamar Selatan	076/55/06	SJK (C) Phooi Yong
Pasir Bedamar（N55）	Jalan Market Barat	076/55/07	SJK (T) Thiruvalluvar
Pasir Bedamar（N55）	Jalan Market Timor	076/55/08	SMK Convent
Pasir Bedamar（N55）	Jalan Anson	076/55/09	SK Seri Intan
Pasir Bedamar（N55）	Jalan Canal	076/55/10	SK Horley Methodist
Pasir Bedamar（N55）	Jalan Speedy	076/55/11	SMK St. Anthony
Pasir Bedamar（N55）	Jalan Sungai Nibong	076/55/12	SK Sultan Idris 2
Pasir Bedamar（N55）	Eastern Garden	076/55/13	SK St. Anthony
Pasir Bedamar（N55）	Jalan Laxamana	076/55/14	SJK (T) Sithambaram Pillay
Pasir Bedamar（N55）	Kampong Guru	076/55/15	SK Perempuan Methodist
Pasir Bedamar（N55）	Jalan Batak Rabit Utara	076/55/16	SMK Sultan Abdul Aziz
Pasir Bedamar（N55）	Jalan Batak Rabit Selatan	076/55/17	SJK (C) Chong Min
Pasir Bedamar（N55）	Taman Seri Setia	076/55/18	SK Sultan Abdul Aziz
Pasir Bedamar（N55）	Pekan Baru	076/55/19	SMK Raja Muda Musa

=== Representation history ===
Members of the Legislative Assembly for Pasir Bedamar
Assembly	No	Years	Name	Party
Constituency created
1st	N36	1959-1964	Wah Keng Jooi (华景裕)	Alliance (MCA)
2nd	N36	1964-1969	Saw Beng Kuan (苏明坤)	Alliance (MCA)
		1969-1971	Assembly suspended	
3rd	N36	1969-1971	K. Ramasamy	PPP
3rd	N36	1961-1974	K. Ramasamy	BN (PPP)
4th	N37	1974-1978	Thee Ah Kow (郑幼民)	DAP
5th	N37	1978-1982	Thee Ah Kow (郑幼民)	DAP
6th	N37	1982-1986	Fadzlan Yahya	DAP
7th	N43	1986-1990	Fadzlan Yahya	DAP
8th	N43	1990-1995	Jimmy Loh Jee Mee (罗意美)	DAP
9th	N49	1995-1999	Mah Siew Keong (马袖强)	BN (GERAKAN)
10th	N49	1999-2004	Seah Leong Peng (谢昂凭)	DAP
11th	N55	2004-2008	Seah Leong Peng (谢昂凭)	DAP
12th	N55	2008-2013	Seah Leong Peng (谢昂凭)	PR (DAP)
13th	N55	2013-2015	Terence Naidu	PR (DAP)
13th	N55	2015-2018	Terence Naidu	PH (DAP)
14th	N55	2018-2022	Terence Naidu	PH (DAP)
15th	N55	2022–present	Woo Kah Leong (吴家良)	PH (DAP)

== Election results ==
Perak state election, 2022: Pasir Bedamar
Party	Candidate	Votes	%	∆%
PH	Woo Kah Leong	21,061	76.64	▲76.64
BN	Kong Sun Chin	3,615	13.16	▼6.38
PN	Suriyananarayanan Sannasy Naidu	2,803	10.20	▲10.20
Total valid votes		27,479	100.00	
Total rejected ballots		272		
Unreturned ballots		77		
Turnout		27,828	70.25	▼11.19
Registered electors		39,117		
Majority		17,446	63.48	▲6.26
PH hold		Swing		

Perak state election, 2018: Pasir Bedamar
Party	Candidate	Votes	%	∆%
PKR	Terence Naidu	19,480	76.76	▲76.76
BN	Kong Sun Chin	4,960	19.54	▼4.05
PAS	Kumaresan A/L Shanmugam	939	3.70	▲3.70
Total valid votes		25,379	98.75	
Total rejected ballots		226	0.88	
Unreturned ballots		94	0.37	
Turnout		25,699	81.44	▲1.74
Registered electors		31,439		
Majority		14,520	57.22	▲4.40
PKR hold		Swing		
Source(s) "RESULTS OF CONTESTED ELECTION AND STATEMENTS OF THE POLL AFTER THE OFFICIAL ADDITION OF VOTES".

Perak state election, 2013: Pasir Bedamar
Party	Candidate	Votes	%	∆%
DAP	Terence Naidu	18,860	76.41	▲6.01
BN	M. Kayveas	5,823	23.59	▼6.01
Total valid votes		24,683	98.61	
Total rejected ballots		281	1.12	
Unreturned ballots		67	0.27	
Turnout		25,031	79.70	▲10.92
Registered electors		31,411		
Majority		13,037	52.82	▲12.82
DAP hold		Swing		
Source(s) "KEPUTUSAN PILIHAN RAYA UMUM DEWAN UNDANGAN NEGERI".

Perak state election, 2008: Pasir Bedamar
Party	Candidate	Votes	%	∆%
DAP	Seah Leong Peng	13,655	70.40	▲11.34
BN	Lee Heng	5,741	29.60	▼11.34
Total valid votes		19,396	98.07	
Total rejected ballots		338	1.71	
Unreturned ballots		43	0.22	
Turnout		19,777	68.80	▲1.86
Registered electors		28,745		
Majority		7,914	40.80	▲22.68
DAP hold		Swing		
Source(s) "KEPUTUSAN PILIHAN RAYA UMUM DEWAN UNDANGAN NEGERI PERAK BAGI TAHUN 2008".

Perak state election, 2004: Pasir Bedamar
Party	Candidate	Votes	%	∆%
DAP	Seah Leong Peng	11,050	59.06	▼3.67
BN	Lee Heng	7,659	40.94	▲3.67
Total valid votes		18,709	97.61	
Total rejected ballots		459	2.39	
Unreturned ballots		0	0.00	
Turnout		19,168	64.94	▲2.32
Registered electors		29,518		
Majority		3,391	18.12	▼7.34
DAP hold		Swing		
Source(s) "KEPUTUSAN PILIHAN RAYA UMUM DEWAN UNDANGAN NEGERI PERAK BAGI TAHUN 2004".

Perak state election, 1999: Pasir Bedamar
Party	Candidate	Votes	%	∆%
DAP	Seah Leong Peng	12,416	62.73	▲22.32
BN	Teiw Book Toh	7,378	37.27	▼20.44
Total valid votes		19,794	97.58	
Total rejected ballots		465	2.29	
Unreturned ballots		26	0.13	
Turnout		20,285	62.62	▼2.35
Registered electors		32,395		
Majority		5,038	25.46	▲8.16
DAP gain from BN		Swing		?
Source(s) "KEPUTUSAN PILIHAN RAYA UMUM DEWAN UNDANGAN NEGERI PERAK BAGI TAHUN 1999".

Perak state election, 1995: Pasir Bedamar
Party	Candidate	Votes	%	∆%
BN	Mah Siew Keong	10,586	57.71	▲3.42
DAP	Chong Tat Cheong	7,414	40.41	▼20.92
Independent	Chelvarajah @ Selvarajah	345	1.88	▲1.88
Total valid votes		18,345	97.16	
Total rejected ballots		486	2.57	
Unreturned ballots		50	0.26	
Turnout		18,881	64.97	▼3.18
Registered electors		29,059		
Majority		3,172	17.30	▼5.36
BN gain from DAP		Swing		?
Source(s) "KEPUTUSAN PILIHAN RAYA UMUM DEWAN UNDANGAN NEGERI PERAK BAGI TAHUN 1995".

Perak state election, 1990: Pasir Bedamar
Party	Candidate	Votes	%	∆%
DAP	Jimmy Loh Jee Mee	11,747	61.33	▲2.75
BN	Fong Fook Ming	7,407	38.67	▼2.75
Total valid votes		19,154	98.04	
Total rejected ballots		382	1.96	
Unreturned ballots		0	0.00	
Turnout		19,536	68.15	▲0.55
Registered electors		28,667		
Majority		4,340	22.66	▲5.49
DAP hold		Swing		
Source(s) "KEPUTUSAN PILIHAN RAYA UMUM DEWAN UNDANGAN NEGERI PERAK BAGI TAHUN 1990".

Perak state election, 1986: Pasir Bedamar
Party	Candidate	Votes	%	∆%
DAP	Fadzlan Yahya	10,845	58.58	▲9.27
BN	Gan Loot Heng	7,667	41.41	▲41.42
Total valid votes		18,512	97.87	100.00
Total rejected ballots		413		
Unreturned ballots		0		
Turnout		18,925	67.63	▼6.47
Registered electors		27,982		
Majority		3,178	17.17	▲1.96
DAP hold		Swing		
Source(s) "KEPUTUSAN PILIHAN RAYA UMUM DEWAN UNDANGAN NEGERI PERAK BAGI TAHUN 1986".

Perak state election, 1982: Pasir Bedamar
Party	Candidate	Votes	%	∆%
DAP	Mohd Fadzlan Yahya	8,871	49.31	▼14.83
BN	Gan Loot Heng	6,136	34.11	▼1.75
Independent	Thee Ah Kow	2,411	13.40	▲13.40
Independent	Tan Ah Hee	572	3.18	▲3.18
Total valid votes		17,990	100.00	
Total rejected ballots		421		
Unreturned ballots		0		
Turnout		18,411	74.10	▼1.85
Registered electors		24,845		
Majority		2,735	15.20	▼13.07
DAP hold		Swing		

Perak state election, 1982: Pasir Bedamar
Party	Candidate	Votes	%	∆%
DAP	Mohd Fadzlan Yahya	8,871	49.31	▼14.83
BN	Gan Loot Heng	6,136	34.11	▼1.75
Independent	Thee Ah Kow (Thee You Min)	2,411	13.40	▲13.40
Independent	Tan Ah Hee	572	3.18	▲3.18
Total valid votes		17,990	100.00	
Total rejected ballots		421		
Unreturned ballots		0		
Turnout		18,411	74.10	▼1.85
Registered electors		24,845		
Majority		2,735	15.20	▼13.07
DAP hold		Swing		

Perak state election, 1978: Pasir Bedamar
Party	Candidate	Votes	%	∆%
DAP	Thee Ah Kow	10,164	64.14	▲9.04
BN	Chi Lik Sun	5,683	35.86	▲35.86
Total valid votes		15,847	100.00	
Total rejected ballots		486		
Unreturned ballots		0		
Turnout		16,333	75.96	▲3.01
Registered electors		21,503		
Majority		4,481	28.28	▲12.66
DAP hold		Swing		

Perak state election, 1974: Pasir Bedamar
Party	Candidate	Votes	%	∆%
DAP	Thee Ah Kow	6,543	55.10	▲55.10
BN	K. Ramasamy	4,688	39.48	▼25.96
PEKEMAS	Tham Pang Fay	644	5.42	▲5.42
Total valid votes		11,875	100.00	
Total rejected ballots		698		
Unreturned ballots		0		
Turnout		12,573	72.95	▲8.40
Registered electors		17,236		
Majority		1,855	15.62	▼15.25
DAP gain from PPP		Swing		-

Perak state election, 1969: Pasir Bedamar
Party	Candidate	Votes	%	∆%
PPP	K. Ramasamy	8,632	65.43	▲25.44
Alliance	Saw Beng Kuan	4,560	34.57	▼12.02
Total valid votes		13,192	100.00	
Total rejected ballots		709		
Unreturned ballots		0		
Turnout		13,901	64.54	▼12.33
Registered electors		21,538		
Majority		4,072	30.87	▲24.27
PPP gain from Alliance		Swing		-

Perak state election, 1964: Pasir Bedamar
Party	Candidate	Votes	%	∆%
Alliance	Sew Heng Kuan	6,042	46.59	▼29.35
PPP	K. Ramasamy	5,187	40.00	▲15.93
Socialist Front	Chai Kai Wooi	1,740	13.42	▲13.42
Total valid votes		12,969	100.00	
Total rejected ballots		686		
Unreturned ballots		0		
Turnout		13,655	76.87	▲10.88
Registered electors		17,764		
Majority		855	6.59	▼45.29
Alliance hold		Swing		

Perak state election, 1959: Pasir Bedamar
Party	Candidate	Votes	%
Alliance	Wah Keng Jooi	6,713	75.94
PPP	Lee Sooi Soo	2,127	24.06
Total valid votes		8,840	100.00
Total rejected ballots		248	
Unreturned ballots		0	
Turnout		9,088	65.99
Registered electors		13,771	
Majority		4,586	51.88
This was a new constituency created.
