= Changkat Jong =

Political subdivision in Malaysia

Changkat Jong (N56)
Perak constituency

State constituency
- Legislature: Perak State Legislative Assembly
MLA
Nadziruddin Mohamed Bandi
PN
- Constituency created: 1974
- First contested: 1974
- Last contested: 2022

Demographics
- Electors (2022): 48,105

Changkat Jong is a state constituency in Perak, Malaysia, that has been represented in the Perak State Legislative Assembly.

== Demographics ==
Ethnic breakdown of Changkat Jong's electorate as of 2022
1. Malay (62.6%)
2. Indian (22.2%)
3. Chinese (13.8%)
4. Other ethnicities (1.50%)

== History ==
=== Polling districts ===
According to the federal gazette issued on 30 March 2018, the Changkat Jong constituency is divided into 18 polling districts.

State constituency	Polling District	Code	Location
Changkat Jong（N56）	Sungai Tunku	076/56/01	SRA Rakyat Al-Hijrah Sungai Tunku
Changkat Jong（N56）	Kampong Bahagia	076/56/02	SK Kampong Bahagia
Changkat Jong（N56）	Sungai Kerawai	076/56/03	SK Sungai Kerawai
Changkat Jong（N56）	Ladang Sussex	076/56/04	SJK (T) Dato' Sithambaram Pillay
Changkat Jong（N56）	Ladang Selaba	076/56/05	SJK (T) Ladang Selaba
Changkat Jong（N56）	Taman Cecily	076/56/06	SMK Seri Perak
Changkat Jong（N56）	Kampong Padang Tembak	076/56/07	SK Seri Setia
Changkat Jong（N56）	Kampong Banjar	076/56/08	SK Tebok Banjar
Changkat Jong（N56）	Batak Rabit	076/56/09	SK Dato' Laksamana Raja Mahkota
Changkat Jong（N56）	Nova Scotia	076/56/10	SJK (T) Ladang Nova Scotia 1
Changkat Jong（N56）	Kampong Selaba	076/56/11	SK Selabak
Changkat Jong（N56）	Batu Dua Belas Utara	076/56/12	SJK (C) Batu Duabelas
Changkat Jong（N56）	Kampong Baru Ayer Hitam	076/56/13	SK Ayer Hitam
Changkat Jong（N56）	Kampong Changkat Jong	076/56/14	SK Changkat Jong
Changkat Jong（N56）	Kampong Sungai Samak	076/56/15	SK Sungai Samak
Changkat Jong（N56）	Sungai Bugis	076/56/16	SRA Al-Munir Sungai Manila
Changkat Jong（N56）	Ladang Sungai Samak	076/56/17	SJK (T) Ladang Sungai Samak
Changkat Jong（N56）	Ladang Ulu Bernam	076/56/18	SK Ulu Bernam

=== Representation history ===
Members of the Legislative Assembly for Changkat Jong
Assembly	No	Years	Name	Party
Constituency created from Batak Rabit
4th	N38	1974-1978	Darus Mohamed Said	BN (UMNO)
5th	N38	1978-1982	Darus Mohamed Said	BN (UMNO)
6th	N38	1982-1986	Mohd. Arshad Abdullah	BN (UMNO)
7th	N44	1986-1990	Mohd. Arshad Abdullah	BN (UMNO)
8th	N44	1990-1995	Mohd. Arshad Abdullah	BN (UMNO)
9th	N50	1995-1999	Mohd. Arshad Abdullah	BN (UMNO)
10th	N50	1999-2004	Onn Hamzah	BN (UMNO)
11th	N56	2004-2008	Onn Hamzah	BN (UMNO)
12th	N56	2008-2013	Mohd Anuar Sudin	PR (PAS)
13th	N56	2013-2018	Mohd Azhar Jamaluddin	BN (UMNO)
14th	N56	2018–2022	Mohd Azhar Jamaluddin	BN (UMNO)
15th	N56	2022–present	Nadziruddin Mohamed Bandi	PN (BERSATU)

== Election results ==
Perak state election, 2022: Changkat Jong
Party	Candidate	Votes	%	∆%
PN	Nadziruddin Mohamed Bandi	13,232	36.02	▲36.02
PH	Badrul Hisham Badarudin	12,145	33.06	▲33.06
BN	Mohd Azhar Jamaluddin	11,044	30.07	▼9.70
PEJUANG	Muhammad Amirul Mahfuz	312	0.85	▲0.85
Total valid votes		36,733	100.00	
Total rejected ballots		460		
Unreturned ballots		116		
Turnout		37,309	76.36	▲6.08
Registered electors		48,105		
Majority		1,087	2.96	▲2.73
PN gain from BN		Swing		?

Perak state election, 2018: Changkat Jong
Party	Candidate	Votes	%	∆%
BN	Mohd Azhar Jamaluddin	11,216	39.77	▼14.01
PKR	Mohd. Faizul Mohd. Ismail	11,149	39.54	▲39.54
PAS	Mohd.Azhar Mohd.Rafiei	5,834	20.69	▼28.11
Total valid votes		28,199	97.60	
Total rejected ballots		578	2.00	
Unreturned ballots		116	0.40	
Turnout		28,893	82.44	▲0.54
Registered electors		35,048		
Majority		67	0.23	▼4.75
BN hold		Swing		
Source(s) "RESULTS OF CONTESTED ELECTION AND STATEMENTS OF THE POLL AFTER THE OFFICIAL ADDITION OF VOTES".

Perak state election, 2013: Changkat Jong
Party	Candidate	Votes	%	∆%
BN	Mohd Azhar Jamaluddin	12,065	53.78	▲1.06
PAS	Mohd. Anuar Sudin	10,947	48.80	▼3.92
Independent	K. Suppan	269	1.20	▲1.20
Total valid votes		22,432	94.22	
Total rejected ballots		435	1.83	
Unreturned ballots		92	0.39	
Turnout		23,808	81.90	▲10.05
Registered electors		29,072		
Majority		1,118	4.98	▼0.51
BN gain from PAS		Swing		?
"undi.info-CHANGKAT JONG (P76-N56)". MalaysiaKini. 2018.

Perak state election, 2008: Changkat Jong
Party	Candidate	Votes	%	∆%
PAS	Mohd. Anuar Sudin	8,705	52.72	▲14.46
BN	Idris Hashim	7,806	47.23	▼14.46
Total valid votes		16,511	97.34	
Total rejected ballots		410		
Unreturned ballots		41		
Turnout		16,962	71.85	▲4.27
Registered electors		23,609		
Majority		899	5.49	▼17.99
PAS gain from BN		Swing		?
"undi.info-CHANGKAT JONG (P76-N56)". MalaysiaKini. 2018.

Perak state election, 2004: Changkat Jong
Party	Candidate	Votes	%	∆%
BN	Onn Hamzah	9,496	61.74	▲5.57
PAS	Fakharuddin Ahmad Ghazali	5,885	38.26	▲38.26
Total valid votes		15,381	96.70	
Total rejected ballots		489	3.07	
Unreturned ballots		42	0.26	
Turnout		15,906	67.58	▼4.72
Registered electors		23,545		
Majority		3,611	23.48	▲11.14
BN hold		Swing		
"undi.info-CHANGKAT JONG (P76-N56)". MalaysiaKini. 2018.

Perak state election, 1999: Changkat Jong
Party	Candidate	Votes	%	∆%
BN	Onn Hamzah	8,205	56.17	▼10.09
PKR	Hamdan Taha	6,403	43.83	▲43.83
Total valid votes		14,608	96.00	
Total rejected ballots		585	3.84	
Unreturned ballots		23	0.15	
Turnout		15,216	62.86	▼0.83
Registered electors		24,206		
Majority		1,802	12.34	▼20.18
BN hold		Swing		
Source(s) "KEPUTUSAN PILIHAN RAYA UMUM DEWAN UNDANGAN NEGERI PERAK BAGI TAHUN 1999".

Perak state election, 1995: Changkat Jong
Party	Candidate	Votes	%	∆%
BN	Mohd. Arshad Abdullah	9,018	66.26	▲2.56
S46	Sulaiman Nawi	4,593	33.74	▲2.56
Total valid votes		13,611	95.24	
Total rejected ballots		606	4.24	
Unreturned ballots		75	0.52	
Turnout		14,292	63.69	▼5.38
Registered electors		22,441		
Majority		4,425	32.52	▲5.12
BN hold		Swing		
Source(s) "KEPUTUSAN PILIHAN RAYA UMUM DEWAN UNDANGAN NEGERI PERAK BAGI TAHUN 1999".

Perak state election, 1990: Changkat Jong
Party	Candidate	Votes	%	∆%
BN	Mohd. Arshad Abdullah	8,862	63.70	▼3.60
S46	Sulaiman Nawi	5,050	36.30	▲36.30
Total valid votes		13,912	95.62	
Total rejected ballots		638	4.38	
Unreturned ballots		0	0	
Turnout		14,550	69.07	▲4.02
Registered electors		21,065		
Majority		3,812	27.40	▼17.22
BN hold		Swing		
Source(s) "KEPUTUSAN PILIHAN RAYA UMUM DEWAN UNDANGAN NEGERI PERAK BAGI TAHUN 1999".

Perak state election, 1986: Changkat Jong
Party	Candidate	Votes	%	∆%
BN	Mohd. Arshad Abdullah	7,987	67.30	▼2.00
DAP	Law Lian Ho	2,692	22.68	▲2.39
PAS	Abu Hassan Dahalan	1,189	10.02	▲0.58
Total valid votes		11,868	100.00	
Total rejected ballots		404		
Unreturned ballots		0		
Turnout		12,272	65.05	▼8.84
Registered electors		18,865		
Majority		5,295	44.62	▼4.40
BN hold		Swing		
Source(s) "KEPUTUSAN PILIHAN RAYA UMUM DEWAN UNDANGAN NEGERI PERAK BAGI TAHUN 1999".

Perak state election, 1982: Changkat Jong
Party	Candidate	Votes	%	∆%
BN	Mohd Arshad Abdullah (Zainol Abidin)	7,746	69.30	▲5.82
DAP	Lim Ah Chuan	2,268	20.29	▼2.48
PAS	Johar Ahmad	1,055	9.44	▼0.02
Independent	Ahmad Harnaini Abdul Aziz	108	0.97	▲0.97
Total valid votes		11,177	100.00	
Total rejected ballots		303		
Unreturned ballots		0		
Turnout		11,480	73.89	▼1.09
Registered electors		15,537		
Majority		5,478	49.01	▲8.29
BN hold		Swing		

Perak state election, 1978: Changkat Jong
Party	Candidate	Votes	%	∆%
BN	Darus Mohd. Said	5,872	63.49	▼1.82
DAP	Abdullah Abdul Aziz	2,106	22.77	▼5.26
PAS	Ibrahim Yacob	875	9.46	▲9.46
MUPP	T. Muniandy	396	4.28	▲4.28
Total valid votes		9,249	100.00	
Total rejected ballots		560		
Unreturned ballots		0		
Turnout		9,809	74.98	▲4.34
Registered electors		13,082		
Majority		3,766	40.72	▲3.44
BN hold		Swing		

Perak state election, 1974: Changkat Jong
Party	Candidate	Votes	%
BN	Darus Mohd. Said	4,339	65.31
DAP	Alaga Kandasamy	1,862	28.03
PEKEMAS	Harun Saleh	443	6.67
Total valid votes		6,644	100.00
Total rejected ballots		370	
Unreturned ballots		0	
Turnout		7,014	70.64
Registered electors		9,929	
Majority		2,477	37.28
This was a new constituency created.
