= Nadziruddin Mohamed Bandi =

Malaysian politician

Yang Berhormat Tuan Nadziruddin Mohamed Bandi MLA

Member of the Perak State Legislative Assembly for Changkat Jong
- Incumbent
- Assumed office 19 November 2022
- Preceded by: Mohd Azhar Jamaluddin (BN–UMNO)
- Majority: 1,087 (2022)

Personal details
- Born: Nadziruddin bin Mohamed Bandi Perak, Malaysia
- Party: Malaysian United Indigenous Party (BERSATU)
- Other political affiliations: Perikatan Nasional (PN)
- Education: Technical Institute Penang
- Occupation: Politician

Nadziruddin bin Mohamed Bandi is a Malaysian politician who served as Member of the Perak State Legislative Assembly (MLA) for Changkat Jong since November 2022. He is a member of Malaysian United Indigenous Party (BERSATU), a party component of Perikatan Nasional (PN) coalitions.

== Election results ==
Perak State Legislative Assembly
Year	Constituency	Candidate	Votes	Pct	Opponent(s)	Votes	Pct	Ballots cast	Majority	Turnout
2022	N56 Changkat Jong	Nadziruddin Mohamed Bandi (BERSATU)	13,232	36.02%	Badrul Hisham Badarudin (DAP)	12,145	33.06%	37,309	1,087	76.36%
2022	N56 Changkat Jong	Nadziruddin Mohamed Bandi (BERSATU)	13,232	36.02%	Mohd Azhar Jamaluddin (UMNO)	11,044	30.07%	37,309	1,087	76.36%
2022	N56 Changkat Jong	Nadziruddin Mohamed Bandi (BERSATU)	13,232	36.02%	Muhammad Amirul Mahfuz (PEJUANG)	312	0.85%	37,309	1,087	76.36%
