= Mah Siew Keong =

Malaysian politician (born 1961)

Yang Berbahagia Dato' Seri Mah Siew Keong SPMP SMW DPMP AMP
- 馬袖強
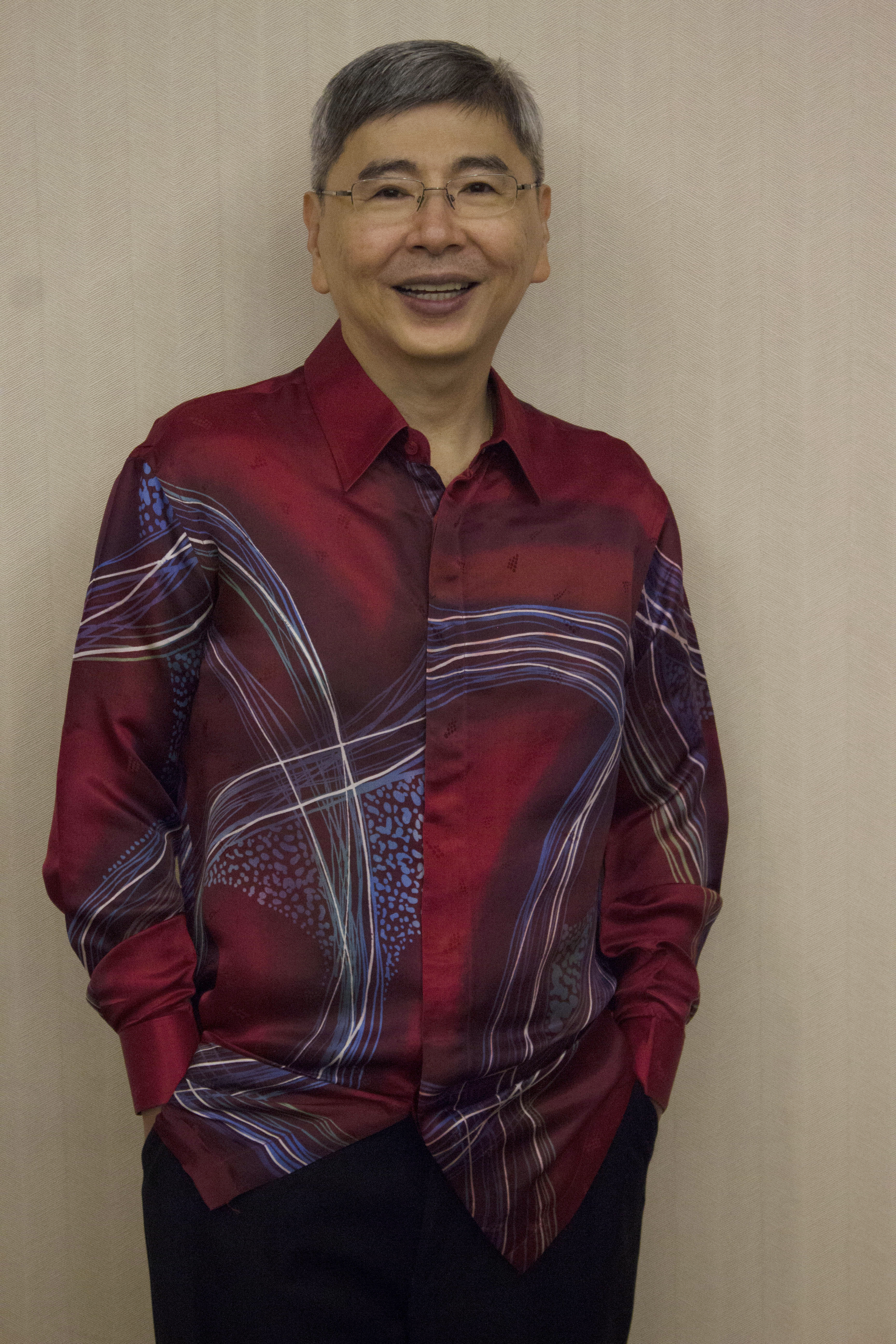

Minister of Plantation Industries and Commodities
- In office 27 June 2016 – 9 May 2018
- Monarchs: Abdul Halim (2016); Muhammad V (2016–2018)
- Prime Minister: Najib Razak
- Deputy: Datu Nasrun Datu Mansur
- Preceded by: Nancy Shukri (Acting)
- Succeeded by: Teresa Kok Suh Sim (Minister of Primary Industries)
- Constituency: Teluk Intan

Minister in the Prime Minister's Department
- In office 27 June 2014 – 27 June 2016
- Monarch: Abdul Halim
- Prime Minister: Najib Razak
- Preceded by: Koh Tsu Koon
- Succeeded by: Nancy Shukri
- Constituency: Teluk Intan

Member of the Malaysian Parliament for Teluk Intan
- In office 31 May 2014 – 9 May 2018
- Preceded by: Seah Leong Peng (PR–DAP)
- Succeeded by: Nga Kor Ming (PH–DAP)
- Majority: 238 (2014)
- In office 29 November 1999 – 8 March 2008
- Preceded by: M. Kulasegaran (DAP)
- Succeeded by: Manogaran Marimuthu (PR–DAP)
- Majority: 2,783 (1999); 10,041 (2004)

Member of the Perak State Legislative Assembly for Pasir Bedamar
- In office 25 April 1995 – 29 November 1999
- Preceded by: Jimmy Loh Jee Mee (DAP)
- Succeeded by: Seah Leong Peng (DAP)
- Majority: 3,172 (1995)

5th President of Parti Gerakan Rakyat Malaysia
- In office 26 October 2013 – 16 September 2018
- Deputy: Cheah Soon Hai
- Preceded by: Chang Ko Youn (Acting)
- Succeeded by: Dominic Lau Hoe Chai

Personal details
- Born: Mah Siew Keong; 17 June 1961 (age 65) Teluk Intan, Perak, Federation of Malaya (now Malaysia)
- Citizenship: Malaysia
- Party: Parti Gerakan Rakyat Malaysia (GERAKAN)
- Other political affiliations: Barisan Nasional (BN) (until 2018); Perikatan Nasional (PN) (since 2021)
- Spouse: Yeoh Pooi Hoon
- Education: London School of Economics; City University London; University of East London

Chinese name
- Traditional Chinese: 馬袖強
- Simplified Chinese: 马袖强
- Hanyu Pinyin: Mǎ Xiùqiáng
- Jyutping: Maa5 Zau6 Koeng4
- Hokkien POJ: Má Siū-kiông
- Tâi-lô: Má Siū-kiông
- Fuzhou BUC: Mā Sêu-giòng

Mah Siew Keong (simplified Chinese: 马袖强; traditional Chinese: 馬袖強; pinyin: Mǎ Xiùqiáng; Jyutping: Maa5 Zau6 Koeng4; Pe̍h-ōe-jī: Má Siū-kiông; Foochow Romanized: Mā Sêu-giòng; born 17 June 1961) is a Malaysian politician who served as Minister of Plantation Industries and Commodities and Minister in the Prime Minister's Department in the Barisan Nasional (BN) administration under former Prime Minister Najib Razak from June 2014 to the collapse of the BN administration in May 2018, Member of Parliament (MP) for Teluk Intan from November 1999 to March 2008 and again from May 2014 to May 2018 and Member of the Perak State Legislative Assembly (MLA) for Pasir Bedamar from April 1995 to November 1999. He is a member and Advisor of Parti Gerakan Rakyat Malaysia (GERAKAN), a component party of presently the Perikatan Nasional (PN) and formerly BN coalition. He previously served as the 5th President of GERAKAN from October 2013 to September 2018.

== Early life and education ==
Mah Siew Keong was born in Teluk Intan, Perak on the 17 June 1961.

Mah studied at Horley Methodist primary and secondary school in Teluk Intan and later continued his studies in the United Kingdom. He graduated with Bachelors in Science (Management) from the London School of Economics and Political Science (LSE) in 1981. He then obtained his master's degree in Business Administration (MBA) from the City University of London. In 1991, Mah graduated with an LLB from the University of East London.

Mah is also a member of MENSA.

== Political career ==
=== Party ===
Mah joined Parti Gerakan Rakyat Malaysia in 1993. He was attracted by the party's struggle for a just, fair and egalitarian Malaysia. Mah steadily rose up the party ranks and held many positions at all the division, state and national levels.

In 2003, Mah was elected as the National Youth Chairman of Gerakan and the Chairman of Teluk Intan Gerakan Division. He was also appointed by the then Party President, the late Tun Dr Lim Keng Yaik as a member of the Party's highest decision making body, the Central Working Committee. Mah also served as the Secretary of the Gerakan Perak State Liaison Committee from 2005 to 2008.

In the 2008 Party election, Mah was elected as one of the party's three elected vice-presidents with the highest votes. In the aftermath of the 2013 General Election, Mah was also appointed the Secretary-General of Gerakan after the resignation of Teng Chang Yeow.

In the 2013 Party Election, Mah was elected as the Party President of Gerakan by defeating Teng Chang Yeow, the Chairman of Gerakan Penang State Liaison Committee.

Mah stepped down on 16 September 2018 and was succeeded by Dominic Lau Hoe Chai as the new Party President of Gerakan.

=== Government ===
Mah has served in various capacities in the Federal Government of Malaysia. After the 2004 General Election, Mah was appointed as Deputy Minister of Trade and Industry. In February 2006, after a Cabinet reshuffle, Mah was appointed Deputy Minister of Agriculture and Agro-based Industries.

Between September 2010 and September 2013, Mah was the Chairman of the Malaysian External Trade Development Corporation (MATRADE).

After Mah's victory in the 2014 Telok Intan by-election, he was appointed Minister in the Prime Minister's Department.

In July 2016, Mah was appointed Minister of Plantation Industries and Commodities in cabinet reshuffle by the Prime Minister.

== Electoral history ==
Mah was elected as the state assemblyman (ADUN) of Pasir Bedamar in the Perak State Legislative Assembly in 1995. Pasir Bedamar is one of the two state seats that form the Teluk Intan Parliamentary Constituency, the other being Changkat Jong.

In 1999, Mah contested Teluk Intan Parliamentary Constituency and defeated Raj Nallaiya of the Democratic Action Party (DAP). In 2004, Mah was reelected as the Member of Parliament of Teluk Intan by defeating Wu Him Ven of the DAP and Gobalakrishnan Nagapan of the People's Justice Party (PKR).

In the 2008 General Election, Mah was defeated by Manogaran Marimuthu of the DAP and it was Mah's first electoral loss since his debut in 1995. The loss corresponded with BN's loss of its customary two-thirds majority in parliament. However, Mah continued to operate a service centre and assisted the voters of his hometown to the best of his ability.

In the 2013 General Election, Mah was once again defeated; by Seah Leong Peng of the DAP with 7,313 votes majority.

However, in early 2014 Seah died of cancer, necessitating the 2014 Telok Intan by-election. Mah accepted the nomination of the party and BN to contest as its candidate for the by-election while DAP nominated Dyana Sofya Mohd Daud as its candidate. After an intense 14 day campaign, Mah prevailed narrowly by 238 votes majority. Mah was dubbed the comeback kid of BN.

Mah lost and failed to retain his seat in the 2018 General Election.

== Election results ==
Perak State Legislative Assembly
Year	Constituency	Candidate	Votes	Pct	Opponent(s)	Votes	Pct	Ballots cast	Majority	Turnout
1995	N49 Pasir Bedamar	Mah Siew Keong (Gerakan)	10,586	56.07%	Chong Tat Cheong (DAP)	7,414	39.27%	18,881	3,172	64.97%
1995	N49 Pasir Bedamar	Mah Siew Keong (Gerakan)	10,586	56.07%	Chelvarajah Ponniah (IND)	345	1.83%	18,881	3,172	64.97%

Parliament of Malaysia
Year	Constituency	Candidate	Votes	Pct	Opponent	Votes	Pct	Ballots cast	Majority	Turnout
1999	P073 Telok Intan	Mah Siew Keong (Gerakan)	18,576	54.05%	Raj Nallaiya (DAP)	15,793	45.95%	35,500	2,783	62.71%
2004	P076 Telok Intan	Mah Siew Keong (Gerakan)	18,870	55.78%	Wu Him Ven (DAP)	8,829	26.10%	35,082	10,041	66.11%
2004	P076 Telok Intan	Mah Siew Keong (Gerakan)	18,870	55.78%	Gobalakrishnan Nagapan (PKR)	6,128	18.12%	35,082	10,041	66.11%
2008	P076 Telok Intan	Mah Siew Keong (Gerakan)	17,016	47.93%	Manogaran Marimuthu (DAP)	18,846	52.07%	36,739	1,470	70.17%
2013	P076 Telok Intan	Mah Siew Keong (Gerakan)	20,086	42.06%	Seah Leong Peng (DAP)	27,399	57.36%	48,839	7,313	80.75%
2013	P076 Telok Intan	Mah Siew Keong (Gerakan)	20,086	42.06%	Moralingam Kannan (IND)	279	0.58%	48,839	7,313	80.75%
2014	P076 Telok Intan	Mah Siew Keong (Gerakan)	20,157	50.30%	Dyana Sofya Mohd Daud (DAP)	19,919	49.70%	40,668	238	67.39%
2018	P076 Teluk Intan	Mah Siew Keong (Gerakan)	17,991	33.53%	Nga Kor Ming (DAP)	29,170	54.36%	53,655	11,179	82.10%
2018	P076 Teluk Intan	Mah Siew Keong (Gerakan)	17,991	33.53%	Ahmad Ramadzan Ahmad Daud (PAS)	6,494	12.11%	53,655	11,179	82.10%

== Honours ==
- Perak
  - Knight Grand Commander of the Order of the Perak State Crown (SPMP) – Dato' Seri (2016)
  - Knight Commander of the Order of the Perak State Crown (DPMP) – Dato' (2004)
  - Member of the Order of the Perak State Crown (AMP) (1996)
- Federal Territory (Malaysia)
  - Grand Commander of the Order of the Territorial Crown (SMW) – Datuk Seri (2016)

== See also ==
- Teluk Intan (federal constituency)

Political offices
Preceded by Chang Ko Youn (Acting President 16 May 2013 – 26 October 2013); Koh Tsu Koon	President of Parti Gerakan Rakyat Malaysia (Gerakan); 26 October 2013 – 16 September 2018	Succeeded by Dominic Lau Hoe Chai
