= Parti Gerakan Rakyat Malaysia =

- English name: Malaysian People's Movement Party
- Abbreviation: PGRM/GERAKAN
- President: Dominic Lau Hoe Chai
- Secretary-General: Wong Chia Zhen
- Deputy President: Oh Tong Keong
- Vice President: Koo Shiaw Lee; Baljit Singh Jigiri Singh; Alexander Lo Su Hyen; Ranndy Yap Kim Heng; Parameswaran Ganason; Chek Kwong Weng; Gary Lee Ban Fatt
- Women Chief: Chung Mon Sie
- Youth Chief: Wong Chia Zhen
- Founder: Syed Hussein Alatas; Tan Chee Khoon; J.B.A. Peter; Lim Chong Eu; Veerappen Veerathan; Wang Gungwu
- Founded: 24 March 1968
- Registered: 22 May 1968
- Legalised: 28 May 1968
- Split from: Malayan Chinese Association (Lim Chong Eu, 1962); Labour Party of Malaya (Syed Hussein Alatas et al., 1968)
- Preceded by: United Democratic Party
- Headquarters: 8, Jalan Pudu Ulu, Cheras, 56100 Kuala Lumpur, Malaysia
- Newspaper: GERAKAN Today (e-periodical)
- Think tank: Socio-Economic Development And Research Institute (SEDAR)
- Youth wing: PEMUDA
- Women's wing: WANITA
- Membership (2022): 285,100
- Ideology: Multiracialism
- Political position: Syncretic
- National affiliation: Perikatan Nasional (since 2021) (Note: The party was part of Barisan Nasional (1973–2018) and was aligned with Alliance (1972–1973). Through PN it is aligned with Barisan Nasional (2021–2022) and was aligned with Gabungan Parti Sarawak (2021–2022).)
- International affiliation: Liberal International (observer) (Note: The party was part of Alliance of Democrats (2005–2012))
- Regional affiliation: Council of Asian Liberals and Democrats
- Colours: Red & Green
- Slogan: Satu Hati Gerak Bersama (Forward Together with One Heart)
- Anthem: Satu Hati
- Dewan Negara: 0 / 70
- Dewan Rakyat: 0 / 222
- Dewan Undangan Negeri: 2 / 612

Election symbol

Party flag

Website
- www.gerakan.org.my

The Parti Gerakan Rakyat Malaysia (English: Malaysian People's Movement Party; abbrev: GERAKAN or less commonly as PGRM) is a liberal political party in Malaysia. Formed in 1968, Gerakan gained prominence in the 1969 general election when it defeated the ruling Alliance Party in Penang and won the majority of seats in Penang's state legislature. However, in 1972, Gerakan joined the Alliance Party, which later evolved into Barisan Nasional (BN) and contested the 1974 general election and subsequent elections as part of the ruling coalition. The party maintained representation in the Dewan Rakyat until the 2018 general election, when it lost all its seats amid BN's historic defeat. Gerakan subsequently left BN and has been a member of Perikatan Nasional (PN) since 2021.

Gerakan also held a dominant position in the Penang State Legislative Assembly from 1969 to 2008 and also achieved some success nationally as part of the ruling BN coalition, particularly in the 2004 general election. However, its fortunes declined sharply in the 2008 election, and left the coalition following BN's defeat in the 2018 general election. While it joined PN in 2021, it had no representation at the national or state-level until the 2023 Kedah state election, where the party achieved its first electoral victory since 2014. Despite clashes with its coalition allies, the party is perceived to be dependent on continued membership within PN.

The party is assisted by an affiliated think tank called SEDAR Institute (Socio-Economic Development And Research Institute). The party is a member of the Council of Asian Liberals and Democrats. At its height, the party's primary source of support came from the country's ethnic Chinese who constitute 80% of the party's membership, with 15% being ethnic Indian and the remaining spread between the Malays and other groups.

== History ==
=== Formation ===
In 1959, the leader of Malaysian Chinese Association (MCA) Lim Chong Eu resigned his position as president after conflict with UMNO leader Tunku Abdul Rahman over the allocation of seats in the 1959 general election. Dr Lim requested that MCA be given 40 seats to contest (MCA was allocated 30 seats). He left MCA, and later set up the United Democratic Party in 1962. In 1968, UDP was dissolved and its former members, together with the Labour Party and others, joined force to form a new party Gerakan. The six founders of the party were Professor Syed Hussain Alatas, Dr. Tan Chee Khoon, Dr. J.B.A. Peter, Lim Chong Eu, Professor Wang Gungwu, and V. Veerapan. Although the majority of its supporters were Chinese, the party positioned itself as a Malaysian, non-communal party that received some support from the Indians and Malays. Its pro tem president was Professor Syed Hussein Alatas, and later Lim took over the presidency which lasted until 1980.

=== 1969–2007 ===
The party won the state of Penang in the 1969 general election by taking 16 out of 24 seats, winning control from the MCA. Lim Chong Eu became Penang's Chief Minister. Gerakan and the Pan-Malaysian Islamic Party, which won in Kelantan, were the only parties not then affiliated with the Alliance Party to form a state government in Malaysia. However, due to internal disputes within the party, for example over plan for closer ties with Alliance, the party was split. Many of its members, such as Syed Hussein Alatas, V. David, Veerappen, and Tan Chee Khoon, left to form Parti Keadilan Masyarakat Malaysia (PEKEMAS). The PEKEMAS party however proved to be short-lived, and Gerakan itself became reduced and largely Chinese as many non-Chinese left the party. In 1972, Gerakan joined the Alliance which became Barisan Nasional in 1973.

In 1973, a number of former MCA members from Perak and Selangor who were expelled from the party, including Lim Keng Yaik and Paul Leong Khee Seong, joined Gerakan. In 1980, Lim Chong Eu decided to retire from the post of party president, and Lim Keng Yaik won the presidency over Lim Chong Eu's preferred candidate Paul Leong. Lim Keng Yaik stayed as president of Gerakan until he decided to retire in 2007.

Gerakan had continual conflicts with MCA as it challenged MCA's position as the main Chinese party within BN. In the 1978 general election, disputes broke out between Gerakan and MCA as seven ex-MCA members (with support from MCA) stood against Gerakan. The party lost some seats but managed to retain its stronghold Penang despite losing its position as the biggest party in Penang. Gerakan also sought to expand its influence in others states, especially in Perak, an effort helped by continued defections from MCA. In 1979, Michael Chen stood against Lee San Choon for the MCA Presidency but lost, then later in 1981 joined Gerakan. He was followed by 120,000 dissidents MCA members, thereby allowing Gerakan to create of new branches and become a nationwide organisation. (Chen however later rejoined MCA after a failed challenge to replace Lim Keng Yaik as leader in 1984). In the 1982 general election, it increased its representation in both the national level (from 4 to 5, out of 7 seats allocated) as well as state level (from 12 to 15).

Before the 1986 general election, Gerakan came into conflict with UMNO when it was suggested that a Malay, possibly Anwar Ibrahim should replace Lim Chong Eu as Penang Chief Minister after his term expired. Gerakan threatened to resign from BN unless it was allocated more seats. It was then allocated 9 seats, it nevertheless lost 4 of these, thereby ending with the same number of seats (5). It also saw increased pressure from Democratic Action Party which increased its representation in the Penang state assembly and overtook Gerakan as the second largest party in the state.

In the 1990 general election, it suffered a setback when Lim Chong Eu was defeated by Lim Kit Siang of Democratic Action Party in his Padang Kota constituency, after which Lim Chong Eu retired from politics. Nevertheless, Gerakan retained the post of Chief Minister of Penang with Dr. Koh Tsu Koon taking over the position. In the 1995 general election, Gerakan bounced back, winning 7 parliamentary seats and 23 state seats. The same year defecting members from LDP founded the party's Sabah chapter in 1995, gaining the party's first foothold in East Malaysia. Representation in the Assembly was brief as Kong Hong Ming, the sole representative there defected again to PBS in 1996.

For nearly four decades, from 1969 to 2008, although not necessarily the biggest party (UMNO was the biggest party in Penang for many years from the late 1970s onward), Gerakan played a dominant role in the Penang State Legislature, and became closely associated with the fortune of Penang. In that time there had been only two chief ministers in Penang, Lim and Koh Tsu Koon, both from Gerakan. In 1996, in an attempt to win broader support, the party shifted its headquarter to Kuala Lumpur.

In the 2004 general election, Gerakan achieved its best electoral result, winning 10 parliamentary seats and 30 state seats. On 27 August 2005, its president Lim Keng Yaik was challenged by the Deputy Kerk Choo Ting in its party election. Lim retained his party President post after winning with 983 votes against 628 votes for Kerk. Koh Tsu Koon became the new Deputy President which he won unopposed after the nomination day for the party election.

=== 2008–2017 ===
In 2008, Lim Keng Yaik retired from politics after relinquishing the post of party president in 2007. Koh Tsu Koon took over as acting president in 2007, and won the presidency uncontested in the 2008 party elections.

In the 2008 general election, the party suffered its worst electoral defeat. The party retained only two parliament seats, compared to the 10 seats it had before the election. As a result, the party lost its only cabinet post in the ensuing cabinet shuffle. In addition, Gerakan also lost power in Penang after governing the state for almost 39 years. Soon after the defeat, a number of prominent members, such as Tan Kee Kwong and Lee Kah Choon, went over to the opposition coalition Pakatan Rakyat to take up posts with Opposition-led state governments in Penang and Selangor.

After the dismal performance in the 12th general election, Gerakan launched a party rejuvenation campaign in conjunction with the party's 40th anniversary celebrations on 25 May 2008 in its bid to rebound in mainstream politics and to regain people's confidence. It outlined three main thrusts, namely to voice Gerakan's ideology, policy position and advocate Malaysian solutions for various major issues, to rebuild, rebrand and re-empower the party at all levels, and to regain people's confidence. The party also launched a new slogan, "Forward Together with One Heart" (Satu Hati Gerak Bersama), and set out its area of concerns and strategies.

In the 2013 general election, the party failed to improve its position and losing one its two remaining parliamentary seats. Later in the year, Mah Siew Keong took over as president after beating Penang Gerakan chairman Teng Chang Yeow for the post. In 2016, for the first time in history, the President of BN did not attend the annual general meeting of Gerakan and instead briefly appeared on video for 2 minutes.

=== 2018–present ===
In the 2018 general election, Gerakan failed to win any seat and therefore had no representation in Parliament for the first time. On 23 June 2018, the party unanimously decided to leave BN in the aftermath of the election. Following the party's departure from Barisan Nasional, the party contested in the 2019 Tanjung Piai by-election, which it lost. It joined the Perikatan Nasional coalition in February 2021.

Gerakan contested the 2022 Malaysian general election as part of the Perikatan Nasional coalition. However, it again failed to win any seat in the parliamentary or state elections. However, the party won a seat in the 2023 Kedah state election, which is the party's first electoral victory since the 2014 Telok Intan by-election.

== Elected representatives ==
=== Senators ===
- His Majesty's appointee:

=== Dewan Undangan Negeri (State Legislative Assembly) ===
Kedah State Legislative Assembly

1 / 36

Terengganu State Legislative Assembly

1 / 33

State	No.	Parliament Constituency	No.	State Constituency	Member	Party
Kedah	P018	Kulim-Bandar Baharu	N35	Kulim	Wong Chia Zhen	GERAKAN
Terengganu	N/A			Nominated Member	Chan Chee How	GERAKAN
Total	Kedah (1),Terengganu (1)					

== Leadership ==
- Advisor:
  - Mah Siew Keong
- National President:
  - Dominic Lau Hoe Chai
- Deputy National President:
  - Oh Tong Keong
- Vice President:
  - Koo Shiaw Lee
  - Baljit Singh Jigiri Singh
  - Alexander Lo Su Hyen
  - Ranndy Yap Kim Heng
  - Parameswaran Ganason
  - Chek Kwong Weng
  - Gary Lee Ban Fatt
  - Wong Chia Zhen
  - Chung Mon Sie
- Secretary-General:
  - Wong Chia Zhen
- Deputy Secretary-General:
  - Wendy Subramaniam
- National Treasurer:
  - Hng Chee Wey
- Women's Chief:
  - Chung Mon Sie
- Youth Chief:
  - Wong Chia Zhen
- Speaker:
  - Prabagaran Vythilingam
- Deputy Speaker:
  - Syed Nor Azman Syed Daros
- Central Committee members:
  - Woo Cheong Yuen
  - Tan Lee Ngee
  - Tan Po Kiat
  - Ch'ng Boon Chye
  - Sin Koon Yen
  - Chandra Balabedha
  - Chai Ko Thing
  - Jimmy Chew Jyh Gang
  - Dennis Gan Thau Onn
  - Lee Boon Shian
  - Tan Chin Hock
  - Peilin Ooi Pei Nar
  - Puvaniten M Helangovan
  - Teoh Chin Wan
  - Gan Kim Keng
  - Yap Kea Ping
  - Loke Ah Hong
  - Tan Heng Choon
  - Chin Phen Fong
  - Azmar Md Ilias
  - Cheang Chee Gooi
  - Chua Chong Yong
  - Raymond Cham Choon Fatt
- Observer:
  - Joseph Khoo Kha Sheang
  - Lim Thuang Seng
  - Ching Su Chen
  - Chang Soon Tiew
- State Chairman:
  - Federal Territory : Lau Hoi Keong
  - Johor & Penang : Oh Tong Keong
  - Kedah : Wong Chia Zhen
  - Kelantan : Chung Mon Sie
  - Malacca : Michael Gan Peng Lam
  - Negeri Sembilan : Gary Lee Ban Fatt
  - Pahang : Ranndy Yap Kim Heng
  - Perak : Chek Kwong Weng
  - Sabah : Alexander Lo Su Hyen
  - Selangor : Henry Teoh Kien Hong
  - Terengganu : Tan Lee Ngee

== Government offices ==
=== State governments ===
GERAKAN's sole state representative joined Kedah state government as junior partner to PAS.

- Kedah (1972–1990, 1995–2008, 2023–present)
- Terengganu (2026–present)
- Penang (1969–2008)
- Perak (1972–2008, 2020–2021)
- Johor (1982–2018)
- Pahang (1972–1978, 1982–2013)
- Selangor (1972–1986, 1995–2008)
- Negeri Sembilan (1995–2008)
- Malacca (1972–1974, 2004–2008)
- Sabah (2013–2018)

Note: bold as Menteri Besar/Chief Minister, italic as junior partner

== List of party leaders (Presidents) ==
Order	Portrait	Name	Term of office		Remarks
1		Syed Hussein Alatas	1968	1969	
2		Lim Chong Eu	1969	1980	
3		Lim Keng Yaik	1980	8 April 2007	
–		Koh Tsu Koon	8 April 2007	4 October 2008	Acting
4		Koh Tsu Koon	4 October 2008	16 May 2013	
–		Chang Ko Youn	16 May 2013	26 October 2013	Acting
5		Mah Siew Keong	26 October 2013	17 November 2018	
6		Dominic Lau Hoe Chai	17 November 2018	Incumbent	

== General election results ==
Election	Total seats won	Seats contested	Total votes	Share of votes	Outcome of election	Election leader
1969	8 / 144	17	178,971	7.5%	▼1 seat; Opposition, later Governing coalition (Alliance Party)	Lim Chong Eu
1974	5 / 144				▼3 seats; Governing coalition (Barisan Nasional)	Lim Chong Eu
1978	4 / 154				▼1 seat; Governing coalition (Barisan Nasional)	Lim Chong Eu
1982	5 / 154				▲1 seat; Governing coalition (Barisan Nasional)	Lim Keng Yaik
1986	5 / 177				; Governing coalition (Barisan Nasional)	Lim Keng Yaik
1990	5 / 180				; Governing coalition (Barisan Nasional)	Lim Keng Yaik
1995	7 / 192				▲2 seats; Governing coalition (Barisan Nasional)	Lim Keng Yaik
1999	7 / 193	9			; Governing coalition (Barisan Nasional)	Lim Keng Yaik
2004	10 / 219	12	257,763	3.7%	▲3 seats; Governing coalition (Barisan Nasional)	Lim Keng Yaik
2008	2 / 222	11	184,548	2.27%	▼8 seats; Governing coalition (Barisan Nasional)	Koh Tsu Koon
2013	1 / 222	11	191,019	1.73%	▼1 seat; Governing coalition (Barisan Nasional)	Koh Tsu Koon
2018	0 / 222	11	128,973	1.07%	▼1 seat; No representation in Parliament (Barisan Nasional)	Mah Siew Keong
2022	0 / 222	23	305,125	1.97%	; No representation in Parliament (Perikatan Nasional)	Dominic Lau Hoe Chai

== State election results ==
State assembly	Election	Votes	%	Seats	Won/contested	+/–	Position (Note: As part of electoral coalition.)	Status
Perlis	2022	Did not contest						No seats
Kedah	2023	47,012	4.0	1 / 36	1 / 3	▲1	▲1st (Perikatan Nasional)	PN (Note: BERSATU–PN (since 2026))
Kelantan	2023	Did not contest						No seats
Terengganu	2023	Did not contest						PN (Note: Appointed state assemblyman.)
Penang	2023	85,003	9.6	0 / 40	0 / 19	Steady	2nd (Perikatan Nasional)	No seats
Perak	2022	26,603	1.8	0 / 59	0 / 9	Steady	▲1st (Perikatan Nasional)	No seats
Pahang	2022	16,915	2.0	0 / 42	0 / 5	Steady	1st (Perikatan Nasional)	No seats
Selangor	2023	72,546	2.7	0 / 56	0 / 8	Steady	2nd (Perikatan Nasional)	No seats
Negeri Sembilan	2026	8,889	1.4	0 / 36	0 / 1	Steady	3rd (Perikatan Nasional)	No seats
Malacca	2026	8,474	1.7	0 / 28	0 / 1	Steady	3rd (Perikatan Nasional)	No seats
Johor	2026	Did not contest						No seats
Sabah	2025	1,392	0.1	0 / 73	0 / 3	Steady	▲8th (Perikatan Nasional)	No seats

Note

State election	State Legislative Assembly									
State election	Kedah	Penang	Perak	Pahang	Selangor	Negeri Sembilan	Malacca	Johor	Sabah	Total won / Total contested
2/3 majority	2 / 3	2 / 3	2 / 3	2 / 3	2 / 3	2 / 3	2 / 3	2 / 3	2 / 3	
1969	2 / 24	16 / 24	2 / 40	1 / 24	4 / 28		1 / 20	0 / 32		26 / 38
1974	1 / 26	11 / 27	1 / 42	1 / 32	1 / 33					15 / 18
1978	1 / 26	8 / 27	2 / 42		1 / 33					12 / 17
1982	1 / 26	8 / 27	3 / 42	1 / 32	1 / 33	0 / 24	0 / 20	1 / 32		15 / 18
1986	1 / 28	9 / 33	1 / 46	1 / 33	0 / 42	0 / 28		1 / 36		13 / 22
1990		7 / 33	1 / 46	1 / 33	0 / 42			1 / 36		10 / 18
1995	2 / 36	10 / 33	5 / 52	1 / 38	1 / 48	1 / 32		2 / 40		22 / 26
1999	2 / 36	10 / 33	3 / 52	1 / 38	2 / 48	1 / 32		2 / 40		21 / 25
2004	2 / 36	13 / 40	4 / 59	1 / 42	4 / 56	2 / 36	1 / 28	3 / 56		30 / 31
2008	1 / 36	0 / 40	0 / 59	1 / 42	0 / 56	0 / 36	0 / 28	2 / 56		4 / 31
2013	0 / 36	0 / 40	0 / 59	0 / 42	0 / 56	0 / 36	0 / 28	1 / 56	2 / 60	3 / 31
2018	0 / 36	0 / 40	0 / 59	0 / 42	0 / 56	0 / 36	0 / 28	0 / 56	0 / 60	0 / 31
2021							0 / 28			0 / 5
2022								0 / 56		0 / 8
2022			0 / 59	0 / 42						0 / 14
2023	1 / 36	0 / 40			0 / 56	0 / 36				1 / 36
2025									0 / 73	0 / 3
2026						0 / 36	0 / 28			0 / 2
