= Bukit Gantang (federal constituency) =

Federal constituency in Perak, Malaysia

Bukit Gantang (P059)
Perak constituency

Federal constituency
- Legislature: Dewan Rakyat
- MP: Syed Abu Hussin Hafiz Syed Abu Fasal; Independent
- Constituency created: 1984
- First contested: 1986
- Last contested: 2022

Demographics
- Population (2020): 107,813
- Electors (2022): 94,253
- Area (km²): 833
- Pop. density (per km²): 129.4

Bukit Gantang is a federal constituency in Larut, Matang and Selama District, Perak, Malaysia, that has been represented in the Dewan Rakyat since 1986.

The federal constituency was created in the 1984 redistribution and is mandated to return a single member to the Dewan Rakyat under the first past the post voting system.

== Demographics ==
Ethnic breakdown of Bukit Gantang's electorate as of 2022
1. Malay (72.0%)
2. Chinese (19.1%)
3. Indian (8.70%)
4. Other ethnicities (0.20%)

As of 2020, Bukit Gantang has a population of 107,813 people.

Age breakdown of Bukit Gantang's electorate as of 2022
1. 18–20 (5.71%)
2. 21–29 (21.2%)
3. 30–39 (23.4%)
4. 40–49 (17.1%)
5. 50–59 (14.0%)
6. 60–69 (11.4%)
7. 70–79 (5.32%)
8. 80–89 (1.58%)
9. above 90 (0.32%)
Gender breakdown of Bukit Gantang's electorate as of 2022
1. Male (49.4%)
2. Female (50.6%)

== History ==
=== Polling districts ===
According to the federal gazette issued on 31 October 2022, the Bukit Gantang constituency is divided into 37 polling districts.

State constituency	Polling Districts	Code	Location
Kuala Sepetang (N13)	Kurina Jaya	059/13/01	SRA Rakyat Nurul Hidayah
Kuala Sepetang (N13)	Palma	059/13/02	SK Taman Palma; Madrasah Al-Zilahiyah
Kuala Sepetang (N13)	Ayer Puteh	059/13/03	SK Ayer Puteh
Kuala Sepetang (N13)	Jebong	059/13/04	SK Ngah Ibrahim
Kuala Sepetang (N13)	Kuala Sepetang	059/13/05	SJK (C) Poay Eng
Kuala Sepetang (N13)	Kampong Menteri	059/13/06	SK Laksamana
Kuala Sepetang (N13)	Jalan Mangala	059/13/07	SJK (C) Khea Wah
Kuala Sepetang (N13)	Simpang Halt	059/13/08	SJK (T) Kampung Jebong Lama
Kuala Sepetang (N13)	Sungai Mati	059/13/09	SMK Matang
Kuala Sepetang (N13)	Sungai Limau	059/13/10	SK Matang Gelugor
Kuala Sepetang (N13)	Matang Gelugor	059/13/11	SK Matang Gelugor
Kuala Sepetang (N13)	Kampong Jaha	059/13/12	Dewan J.K.K.K Kg. Jaha/Kg. Perak
Kuala Sepetang (N13)	Bendang Siam	059/13/13	SMK Dato' Wan Ahmad Rasdi
Kuala Sepetang (N13)	Changkat Ibol	059/13/14	SK Changkat Ibol
Changkat Jering (N14)	Larut Tin	059/14/01	SRA Rakyat Madrasah Al Khairiah Addinah; Dewan Orang Ramai Kg Larut Tin
Changkat Jering (N14)	Kawasan J.K.R	059/14/02	SJK (T) Ladang Holyrood; SRA Rakyat Al Hashimiah Pengkalan Aur
Changkat Jering (N14)	Jalan Simpang	059/14/03	SA Rakyat Al-Irshadiah; SK Pengkalan Aur
Changkat Jering (N14)	Simpang Lama	059/14/04	SRA Rakyat An-Nur; SMK Simpang
Changkat Jering (N14)	Ayer Kuning	059/14/05	SK Changkat Larut; SMK Pengkalan Aur
Changkat Jering (N14)	Changkat Jering	059/14/06	SK Changkat Jering
Changkat Jering (N14)	Jelutong	059/14/07	SK Jelutong
Changkat Jering (N14)	Bukit Gantang	059/14/08	SK Dato Panglima Bukit Gantang
Changkat Jering (N14)	Kampong Cheh	059/14/09	SK Sultan Abdullah
Trong (N15)	Kuala Trong	059/15/01	SJK (C) Siu Sin
Trong (N15)	Trong Barat	059/15/02	SK Toh Johan
Trong (N15)	Kampong Telok Trong	059/15/03	SK Temelok
Trong (N15)	Temelok	059/15/04	SK Temelok
Trong (N15)	Pasir Hitam Trong	059/15/05	SJK (C) Aik Hua
Trong (N15)	Sungai Tinggi	059/15/06	SK Sungai Tinggi
Trong (N15)	Sungai Che Rahmat	059/15/07	SK Permatang Raja
Trong (N15)	Permatang Raja	059/15/08	SK Permatang Raja
Trong (N15)	Batu Hampar	059/15/09	SK Batu Hampar
Trong (N15)	Sungai Rotan	059/15/10	SJK (C) Sungai Rotan
Trong (N15)	Padang Gajah	059/15/11	SK Padang Gajah
Trong (N15)	Ayer Terjun	059/15/12	SJK (C) Ngai Seng
Trong (N15)	Trong	059/15/13	SK Toh Johan
Trong (N15)	Bukit Gantang Selatan	059/15/14	SK Toh Johan

=== Representation history ===
Members of Parliament for Bukit Gantang
Parliament	No	Years	Member	Party	Vote Share
Constituency created from Matang, Taiping and Bagan Serai
7th	P053	1986–1990	Abdullah Fadzil Che Wan (عبدالله فاذل چي وان)	BN (UMNO)	16,579; 63.29%
8th	P053	1990–1995	Abdullah Fadzil Che Wan (عبدالله فاذل چي وان)	BN (UMNO)	18,210; 62.35%
9th	P056	1995–1999	Abdullah Fadzil Che Wan (عبدالله فاذل چي وان)	BN (UMNO)	24,590; 72.27%
10th	P056	1999–2004	Abdullah Fadzil Che Wan (عبدالله فاذل چي وان)	BN (UMNO)	21,184; 56.84%
11th	P059	2004–2008	Tan Lian Hoe (陈莲花)	BN (GERAKAN)	23,294; 61.79%
12th	P059	2008–2009	Roslan Shaharum (روسلن شاهروم)	PR (PAS)	20,015; 50.88%
12th	P059	2009–2013	Mohammad Nizar Jamaluddin (نزار جمال الدين)	PR (PAS)	21,860; 53.33%
13th	P059	2013–2015	Idris Ahmad (إدريس أحمد)	PR (PAS)	30,563; 50.82%
13th	P059	2015–2016	Idris Ahmad (إدريس أحمد)	PAS	30,563; 50.82%
13th	P059	2016–2018	Idris Ahmad (إدريس أحمد)	GS (PAS)	30,563; 50.82%
14th	P059	2018	Syed Abu Hussin Hafiz Syed Abdul Fasal (سيد أبو حسين بن حفيظ سيد عبدالفصل)	BN (UMNO)	22,450; 39.48%
14th	P059	2018–2020	Syed Abu Hussin Hafiz Syed Abdul Fasal (سيد أبو حسين بن حفيظ سيد عبدالفصل)	Independent	22,450; 39.48%
14th	P059	2020–2022	Syed Abu Hussin Hafiz Syed Abdul Fasal (سيد أبو حسين بن حفيظ سيد عبدالفصل)	PN (BERSATU)	22,450; 39.48%
15th	P059	2022–2024	Syed Abu Hussin Hafiz Syed Abdul Fasal (سيد أبو حسين بن حفيظ سيد عبدالفصل)	PN (BERSATU)	32,625; 45.59%
15th	P059	2024–present	Syed Abu Hussin Hafiz Syed Abdul Fasal (سيد أبو حسين بن حفيظ سيد عبدالفصل)	Independent	32,625; 45.59%

=== State constituency ===
Parliamentary constituency	State constituency						
Parliamentary constituency	1955–1959*	1959–1974	1974–1986	1986–1995	1995–2004	2004–2018	2018–present
Bukit Gantang				Changkat Jering			
Bukit Gantang					Kuala Sapetang		
Bukit Gantang							Kuala Sepetang
Bukit Gantang				Sapetang			
Bukit Gantang					Trong		

=== Historical boundaries ===
State Constituency	Area			
State Constituency	1984	1994	2003	2018
Changkat Jering	Air Kuning; Bukit Gantang; Changkat Jering; Kampung Paya; Trong	Air Kuning; Bukit Gantang; Changkat Jering; Kampung Paya; Sungai Lidin		Air Kuning; Bukit Gantang; Changkat Jering; Kampung Paya; Simpang
Kuala Sepetang		Matang; Kuala Sepetang; Selinsing; Simpang Halt; Taman Larah Aman	Changkat Ibol; Kuala Sepetang; Matang; Simpang Halt; Taman Larah Aman	
Sapetang	Matang; Kuala Sepetang; Selinsing; Simpang Halt; Taman Larah Aman			
Trong		Kampung Changkat Ibol; Kampung Permatang Raja; Kampung Sungai Nyior; Kampung Tebok; Trong	Ladang Allagar; Kampung Permatang Raja; Kampung Sungai Nyior; Kampung Tebok; Trong	

=== Current state assembly members ===
No.	State Constituency	Member	Coalition (Party)
N13	Kuala Sepetang	Ahmad Man	PN (BERSATU)
N14	Changkat Jering	Rahim Ismail	PN (PAS)
N15	Trong	Faisal Abdul Rahman	PN (PAS)

=== Local governments & postcodes ===
No.	State Constituency	Local Government	Postcode
N13	Kuala Sepetang	Taiping Municipal Council	32700 Beruas; 34000 Taiping; 34600 Kamunting; 34650 Kuala Sepetang; 34700 Simpang; 34750 Matang; 34800 Trong; 34850 Changkat Jering; 34900 Pantai Remis
N14	Changkat Jering	Taiping Municipal Council	32700 Beruas; 34000 Taiping; 34600 Kamunting; 34650 Kuala Sepetang; 34700 Simpang; 34750 Matang; 34800 Trong; 34850 Changkat Jering; 34900 Pantai Remis
N15	Trong	Taiping Municipal Council	32700 Beruas; 34000 Taiping; 34600 Kamunting; 34650 Kuala Sepetang; 34700 Simpang; 34750 Matang; 34800 Trong; 34850 Changkat Jering; 34900 Pantai Remis

== Election results ==
Malaysian general election, 2022
Party	Candidate	Votes	%	∆%
PN	Syed Abu Hussin Hafiz Syed Abdul Fasal	32,625	45.59	▲45.59
BN	Mohammad Sollehin Mohamad Tajie	19,869	27.76	▼11.72
PH	Fakhruldin Mohd Hashim	18,565	25.94	▲25.94
PEJUANG	Mohd Shukri Mohd Yusoff	508	0.71	▲0.71
Total valid votes		71,567	100.00	
Total rejected ballots		1,033		
Unreturned ballots		135		
Turnout		72,735	75.93	▼6.89
Registered electors		94,253		
Majority		12,756	17.83	▲10.64
PN gain from BN		Swing		?
Source(s) https://lom.agc.gov.my/ilims/upload/portal/akta/outputp/1753277/PUB610%20PARLIMEN%20PERAK.pdf

Malaysian general election, 2018
Party	Candidate	Votes	%	∆%
BN	Syed Abu Hussin Hafiz Abdul Fasal	22,450	39.48	▼9.70
PKR	Khadri Khalid	18,361	32.29	▲32.29
PAS	Idris Ahmad	16,052	28.23	▼22.59
Total valid votes		56,863	100.00	
Total rejected ballots		761		
Unreturned ballots		243		
Turnout		57,867	82.82	▼3.35
Registered electors		69,873		
Majority		4,089	7.19	▲5.55
BN gain from PAS		Swing		?
Source(s) "His Majesty's Government Gazette - Notice of Contested Election, Parliament for the State of Perak [P.U. (B) 237/2018]" (PDF). Attorney General's Chambers of Malaysia. 3 May 2018. "Federal Government Gazette - Results of Contested Election and Statements of the Poll after the Official Addition of Votes, Parliamentary Constituencies for the State of Perak [P.U. (B) 311/2018]" (PDF). Attorney General's Chambers of Malaysia. 28 May 2018.

Malaysian general election, 2013
Party	Candidate	Votes	%	∆%
PAS	Idris Ahmad	30,563	50.82	▼2.51
BN	Ismail Saffian	29,577	49.18	▲2.66
Total valid votes		60,140	100.00	
Total rejected ballots		748		
Unreturned ballots		130		
Turnout		61,018	85.63	▲11.00
Registered electors		71,257		
Majority		986	1.64	▼5.17
PAS hold		Swing		
Source(s) "Federal Government Gazette - Notice of Contested Election, Parliament for the State of Perak [P.U. (B) 174/2013]" (PDF). Attorney General's Chambers of Malaysia. 26 April 2013. Archived from the original (PDF) on 29 December 2019. "Federal Government Gazette - Results of Contested Election and Statements of the Poll after the Official Addition of Votes, Parliamentary Constituencies for the State of Perak [P.U. (B) 215/2013]" (PDF). Attorney General's Chambers of Malaysia. 22 May 2013.

Malaysian general by-election, 7 April 2009 Upon the death of incumbent, Roslan Shaharum
Party	Candidate	Votes	%	∆%
PAS	Mohammad Nizar Jamaluddin	21,860	53.33	▲2.45
BN	Ismail Saffian	19,071	46.52	▼0.38
Independent	Kamarul Ramizu Idris	62	0.15	▲0.15
Total valid votes		40,993	100.00	
Total rejected ballots		456		
Unreturned ballots		18		
Turnout		41,467	74.63	▲1.98
Registered electors		55,562		
Majority		2,789	6.81	▲2.83
PAS hold		Swing		
Source(s) "Pilihan Raya Kecil P.059 Bukit Gantang". Election Commission of Malaysia.

Malaysian general election, 2008
Party	Candidate	Votes	%	∆%
PAS	Roslan Shaharum	20,015	50.88	▲12.67
BN	Abdul Azim Mohd Zabidi	18,449	46.90	▼14.89
Independent	Mohganan P. Manikam	872	2.22	▲2.22
Total valid votes		39,336	100.00	
Total rejected ballots		851		
Unreturned ballots		114		
Turnout		40,301	72.65	▲0.93
Registered electors		55,471		
Majority		1,566	3.98	▼19.60
PAS gain from BN		Swing		?

Malaysian general election, 2004
Party	Candidate	Votes	%	∆%
BN	Tan Lian Hoe	23,294	61.79	▲4.95
PAS	Lo' Lo' Mohamad Ghazali	14,406	38.21	▼4.95
Total valid votes		37,700	100.00	
Total rejected ballots		886		
Unreturned ballots		56		
Turnout		38,642	71.72	▲4.01
Registered electors		53,627		
Majority		8,888	23.58	▲9.90
BN hold		Swing		

Malaysian general election, 1999
Party	Candidate	Votes	%	∆%
BN	Abdullah Fadzil Che Wan	21,184	56.84	▼15.43
PAS	Roslan Shaharum	16,083	43.16	▲43.16
Total valid votes		37,267	100.00	
Total rejected ballots		838		
Unreturned ballots		68		
Turnout		38,173	67.71	▼0.64
Registered electors		56,377		
Majority		5,101	13.68	▼30.86
BN hold		Swing		

Malaysian general election, 1995
Party	Candidate	Votes	%	∆%
BN	Abdullah Fadzil Che Wan	24,590	72.27	▲9.92
S46	Abdullah Hudi Abdul Latif	9,436	27.73	▲27.73
Total valid votes		34,026	100.00	
Total rejected ballots		1,635		
Unreturned ballots		406		
Turnout		36,067	68.35	▼3.70
Registered electors		52,768		
Majority		15,154	44.54	▲19.84
BN hold		Swing		

Malaysian general election, 1990
Party	Candidate	Votes	%	∆%
BN	Abdullah Fadzil Che Wan	18,210	62.35	▼0.91
PAS	Azizan Mohamed Desa	10,997	37.65	▲0.91
Total valid votes		29,207	100.00	
Total rejected ballots		893		
Unreturned ballots		0		
Turnout		30,100	72.05	▲4.11
Registered electors		41,775		
Majority		7,213	24.70	▼1.82
BN hold		Swing		

Malaysian general election, 1986
Party	Candidate	Votes	%
BN	Abdullah Fadzil Che Wan	16,579	63.26
PAS	Baharuddin Abdul Latif	9,628	36.74
Total valid votes		26,207	100.00
Total rejected ballots		1,060	
Unreturned ballots		0	
Turnout		27,267	67.94
Registered electors		40,131	
Majority		6,951	26.52
This was a new constituency created.
