= Rahim Ismail =

Malaysian politician

Yang Berhormat Tuan Haji Rahim Ismail MLA
- رحيم اسماعيل
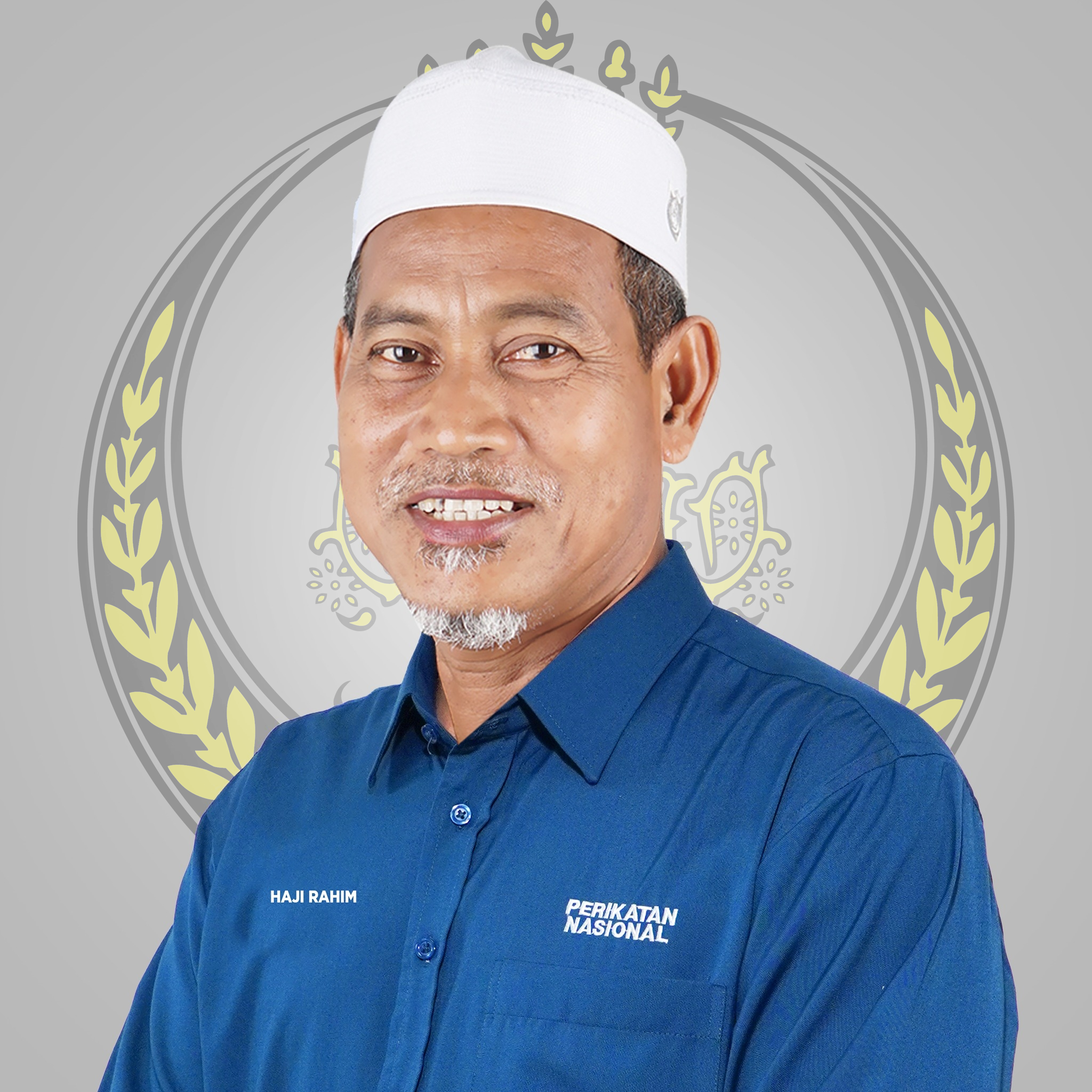

Member of the Perak State Legislative Assembly for Changkat Jering
- Incumbent
- Assumed office 19 December 2022
- Preceded by: Ahmad Saidi Mohamad Daud (BN–UMNO)
- Majority: 3,151 (2022)

Personal details
- Born: Kampung Jelapang Jaya, Simpang, Taiping, Perak
- Party: Malaysian Islamic Party (PAS)
- Other political affiliations: Gagasan Sejahtera (GS) (–2020); Perikatan Nasional (PN) (2020–present)
- Occupation: Politician

Rahim bin Ismail is a Malaysian politician and physician who served as Member of the Perak State Legislative Assembly (MLA) for Changkat Jering since November 2022. He is a member of Malaysian Islamic Party (PAS), a component party of Perikatan Nasional (PN).

== Election results ==
Parliament of Malaysia
Year	Constituency	Candidate	Votes	Pct	Opponent(s)	Votes	Pct	Ballots cast	Majority	Turnout
2018	N13 Kuala Sepetang	Rahim Ismail (PAS)	6,296	26.28%	Mohd Kamaruddin Abu Bakar (UMNO)	8,993	37.54%	24,363	329	83.17%
2018	N13 Kuala Sepetang	Rahim Ismail (PAS)	6,296	26.28%	Chua Yee Ling (PKR)	8,664	36.17%	24,363	329	83.17%
2022	N14 Changkat Jering	Rahim Ismail (PAS)	11,790	41.89%	Ahmad Saidi Mohamad Daud (UMNO)	8,639	30.69%	29,060	3,151	77.30%
2022	N14 Changkat Jering	Rahim Ismail (PAS)	11,790	41.89%	Megat Shariffudin Ibrahim (AMANAH)	7,511	26.68%	29,060	3,151	77.30%
2022	N14 Changkat Jering	Rahim Ismail (PAS)	11,790	41.89%	Nazar Talib (PEJUANG)	208	0.74%	29,060	3,151	77.30%
