= 2009 Bukit Gantang by-election =

Election in Malaysia

- 7 April 2009

Bukit Gantang seat in the Dewan Rakyat
| | | BN | IND |
| Candidate | Mohammad Nizar Jamaluddin | Ismail Saffian | Kamarul Ramizu Idris |
| Party | PAS | BN (UMNO) | Independent |
| Alliance | PR |
| Popular vote | 21,860 | 19,071 | 62 |
| Percentage | 53.33% | 46.52% | 0.15% |
MP before election
Roslan Shaharum
PAS
Elected MP
Mohammad Nizar Jamaluddin
PAS

The 2009 Bukit Gantang by-election is a by-election for the Dewan Rakyat federal seat of Bukit Gantang, Malaysia that were held on 7 April 2009. It was called following the death of the incumbent, Roslan Shaharum on 9 February 2009.

The by election was held on the same day as the 2009 Bukit Selambau by-election and 2009 Batang Ai by-election.

== Background ==
Roslan Shaharum, a candidate of Pan-Malaysian Islamic Party (PAS), were elected to the Parliament of Malaysia federal seat of Bukit Gantang in Perak at the 2008 Malaysian general election, winning the seat from Barisan Nasional (BN). Roslan formerly was the human resource director of Perak Economic Development Corporation, he was appointed as chairman of Yayasan Perak in 2008 months after he was elected as member of Parliament.

On 9 February 2009, Roslan died at Batu Gajah after suffering a heart attack. His death means that his Bukit Gantang state seat were vacated. This necessitates for a by-election to be held, as the seat were vacated more that 2 years before the expiry of the Malaysian parliament current term. Election Commission of Malaysia announced on 13 February 2009 that the by-election for both this seat and Bukit Selambau state seat in Kedah will be held on 7 April 2009, with 29 March 2009 set as the nomination day.

== Nomination and campaign ==
After nomination closed, it was confirmed there will be a three way fight for the Bukit Gantang seat. BN nominated Ismail Saffian, the United Malays National Organization (UMNO) former Bukit Gantang information chief. PAS meanwhile nominated Mohammad Nizar Jamaluddin, PAS Perak deputy commissioner, member of Perak State Legislative Assembly for Pasir Panjang and former Menteri Besar of Perak, who were recently ousted in the 2009 Perak constitutional crisis. An independent candidate, Kamarul Ramizu Idris, also handed his nomination on nomination day, and said that he entered the by-election as a platform to promote his own party, Parti Iman Se-Malaysia which is not registered yet with Registrar of Societies.

== Timeline ==
The key dates are listed below.

| Date | Event |
|---|---|
| | Issue of the Writ of Election |
| 29 March 2009 | Nomination Day |
| 29 March - 6 April 2009 | Campaigning Period |
| | Early polling day for postal and overseas voters |
| 7 April 2009 | Polling Day |

== Results ==
Malaysian general by-election, 7 April 2009: Bukit Gantang Upon the death of incumbent, Roslan Shaharum
| Party | Candidate | Votes | % | ∆% |
|---|---|---|---|---|
| PAS | Mohammad Nizar Jamaluddin | 21,860 | 53.33 | ▲2.45 |
| BN | Ismail Saffian | 19,071 | 46.52 | ▼0.38 |
| Independent | Kamarul Ramizu Idris | 62 | 0.15 | ▲0.15 |
| Total valid votes | | 40,993 | 100.00 | |
| Total rejected ballots | | 456 | | |
| Unreturned ballots | | 18 | | |
| Turnout | | 41,467 | 74.63 | ▼1.98 |
| Registered electors | | 55,562 | | |
| Majority | | 2,789 | 6.81 | ▲2.83 |
| PAS hold | | Swing | N/A | |
Source(s) "Pilihan Raya Kecil P.059 Bukit Gantang". Election Commission of Malaysia.

=== Previous result ===
Malaysian general election, 2008: Bukit Gantang
| Party | Candidate | Votes | % | ∆% |
|---|---|---|---|---|
| PAS | Roslan Shaharum | 20,015 | 50.88 | ▲12.67 |
| BN | Abdul Azim Mohd Zabidi | 18,449 | 46.90 | ▼14.89 |
| Independent | Mohganan P. Manikam | 872 | 2.22 | ▲2.22 |
| Total valid votes | | 39,336 | 100.00 | |
| Total rejected ballots | | 851 | | |
| Unreturned ballots | | 114 | | |
| Turnout | | 40,301 | 72.65 | ▲0.93 |
| Registered electors | | 55,471 | | |
| Majority | | 1,566 | 3.98 | ▼19.60 |
| PAS gain from BN | | Swing | N/A | |
