= Syed Abu Hussin Hafiz =

Malaysian politician

Yang Berhormat Dato' Syed Abu Hussin Hafiz Syed Abdul Fasal DPMP MP
- سيد أبو حسين حفيظ سيد عبدالفصل

Member of the Malaysian Parliament for Bukit Gantang
- Incumbent
- Assumed office 9 May 2018
- Preceded by: Idris Ahmad (PR–PAS)
- Majority: 4,089 (2018); 12,756 (2022)

Chairman of the Fisheries Development Authority of Malaysia
- In office 1 May 2020 – 15 December 2022
- Minister: Ronald Kiandee (2020–2022); Mohamad Sabu (3–15 December 2022)
- Preceded by: Muhammad Faiz Fadzil
- Succeeded by: Muhammad Faiz Fadzil

Faction represented in Dewan Rakyat
- 2018: Barisan Nasional
- 2018–2020, 2024–: Independent
- 2020: Malaysian United Indigenous Party
- 2020–2024: Perikatan Nasional

Personal details
- Born: Syed Abu Hussin Hafiz Syed Abdul Fasal; 29 July 1960 (age 66) Bukit Gantang, Perak, Federation of Malaya (now Malaysia)
- Citizenship: Malaysian
- Party: United Malay National Organisation (UMNO) (until 2018); Independent (2018–2020, 2024–); Malaysian United Indigenous Party (BERSATU) (2020–2024)
- Other political affiliations: Barisan Nasional (BN) (until 2018); Perikatan Nasional (PN) (2020–2024)
- Occupation: Politician

Dato' Syed Abu Hussin Hafiz bin Syed Abdul Fasal (Jawi سيد أبو حسين بن حفيظ سيد عبدالفصل; is a Malaysian politician who has served as the Member of Parliament (MP) for Bukit Gantang since May 2018. He served as Chairman of the Fisheries Development Authority of Malaysia (LKIM) from May 2020 to December 2022. He was a member of the Malaysian United Indigenous Party (BERSATU), a component party of the Perikatan Nasional (PN) coalition and was also a member of the United Malays National Organisation (UMNO), a component party of the Barisan Nasional (BN) coalition. Currently, he is an independent politician since his BERSATU membership ended on 12 June 2024.

== Political career ==
=== Member of Parliament (since 2018) ===
==== 2018 general election ====
In the 2018 general election, Syed Abu Hussin made his electoral debut after being nominated by BN to contest for the Bukit Gantang federal seat. He was elected to the Parliament as the Bukit Gantang MP for the first term by a majority of 4,089 votes.

Later in the year, he resigned from BN and UMNO and became an independent.

In May 2020, Syed Abu Hussin was appointed the Chairman of LKIM.

In June 2020, Syed Abu Hussin joined PN and BERSATU.

==== 2022 general election ====
In the 2022 general election, Syed Abu Hussin was renominated by PN to defend the Bukit Gantang seat. He was reelected to the Parliament as the Bukit Gantang MP for the second term by an increased majority of 12,756 votes.

==== Support for Prime Minister Anwar Ibrahim and his government ====
On 28 November 2023, Syed Abu Hussin declared support for Prime Minister Anwar Ibrahim and his government during Prime Minister's Question (PMQ) session in the Dewan Rakyat chamber. He became the fifth Opposition, PN and BERSATU MP to do so after Kuala Kangsar MP Iskandar Dzulkarnain Abdul Khalid, Labuan MP Suhaili Abdul Rahman, Gua Musang MP Mohd Azizi Abu Naim and Jeli MP Zahari Kechik. However, like the four MPs, he pledged loyalty to BERSATU and remained its member although supporting Anwar and his government. He also called on former Prime Ministers Muhyiddin Yassin and Ismail Sabri Yaakob to work with Anwar in developing the nation and realising the Malaysia Madani agendas as well as setting aside their political differences.

After his declaration of support, Syed Abu Hussin repeatedly claimed that more MPs would follow them and declare support for Anwar and his government. He also explained that he had made the decision as he felt sidelined by the BERSATU party leadership and it did nothing to help him in getting the government allocations for Bukit Gantang. He also expected the Malaysian Islamic Party (PAS) to leave PN and sever cooperation and partnership with BERSATU as PAS had a history of changing political partners shortly before a general election. Hence, he urged BERSATU to be prepared for it.

On 28 January 2024, Syed Abu Hussin became the first opposition MP in support of the government to be appointed to a government position after Anwar named Syed Abu Hussin to lead a committee under the National Action Council on the Cost of Living (NACCOL) and tasked him to coordinate efforts to handle the matters related to the cost of living.

On 29 February 2024, Syed Abu Hussin and Mohd Azizi expressed their willingness to vacate their seats and resign as MPs if the BERSATU party constitution amendment that was set to be tabled during the Extraordinary General Meeting (EGM) of the party on 2 March 2024 required them to do so. Syed Abu Hussin also clarified that he was being paid as the Chairman of NACCOL committee and was offered the position by Prime Minister Anwar. However, Masjid Tanah MP Mas Ermieyati Samsudin responded that it would be unfair for Syed Abu Hussin, Mohd Azizi and other MPs who pledged support for Prime Minister Anwar and his government to vacate their seats and resign as MPs. She added that the amendments tabled should not act retrospectively.

== Election results ==
Parliament of Malaysia
Year	Constituency	Candidate	Votes	Pct	Opponent(s)	Votes	Pct	Ballots cast	Majority	Turnout
2018	P059 Bukit Gantang	Syed Abu Hussin Hafiz Syed Abdul Fasal (UMNO)	22,450	39.48%	Khadri Khalid (BERSATU)	18,361	32.29%	57,867	4,089	82.82%
2018	P059 Bukit Gantang	Syed Abu Hussin Hafiz Syed Abdul Fasal (UMNO)	22,450	39.48%	Idris Ahmad (PAS)	16,052	28.23%	57,867	4,089	82.82%
2022	P059 Bukit Gantang	Syed Abu Hussin Hafiz Syed Abdul Fasal (BERSATU)	32,625	45.59%	Mohammad Sollehin Mohamad Tajie (UMNO)	19,869	27.76%	71,565	12,756	75.93%
2022	P059 Bukit Gantang	Syed Abu Hussin Hafiz Syed Abdul Fasal (BERSATU)	32,625	45.59%	Fakhruldin Mohd Hashim (AMANAH)	18,565	25.94%	71,565	12,756	75.93%
2022	P059 Bukit Gantang	Syed Abu Hussin Hafiz Syed Abdul Fasal (BERSATU)	32,625	45.59%	Mohd Shukri Mohd Yusoff (PUTRA)	508	0.71%	71,565	12,756	75.93%

== Honours ==
=== Honours of Malaysia ===
- Malaysia
  - Recipient of the 17th Yang di-Pertuan Agong Installation Medal
- Perak
  - Knight Commander of the Order of the Perak State Crown (DPMP) – Dato' (2010)
