= Mohammad Nizar Jamaluddin =

Malaysian politician (born 1957)

Yang Berhormat Dato' Seri Ir. Haji Mohammad Nizar Jamaluddin SPMP MLA
- نذار جمال الدين

Member of the Perak State Executive Council
- Incumbent
- Assumed office 22 November 2022 (Infrastructure, Energy, Water & Public Transport : since 23 November 2022) (Note: Assumed portfolios a day after taking office.)
- Monarch: Nazrin Shah
- Menteri Besar: Saarani Mohamad
- Preceded by: Mohd Zolkafly Harun
- Constituency: Sungai Rapat
- In office 19 May 2018 – 10 March 2020 (Investment & Corridor Development)
- Monarch: Nazrin Shah
- Menteri Besar: Ahmad Faizal Azumu
- Preceded by: Mohd Zahir Abdul Khalid
- Succeeded by: Shahrul Zaman Yahya
- Constituency: Sungai Rapat

10th Menteri Besar of Perak
- In office 17 March 2008 – 12 May 2009
- Monarch: Azlan Shah
- Preceded by: Tajol Rosli Mohd Ghazali
- Succeeded by: Zambry Abdul Kadir
- Constituency: Pasir Panjang

Member of the Perak State Legislative Assembly for Sungai Rapat
- Incumbent
- Assumed office 9 May 2018
- Preceded by: Radzi Zainon (PR–PAS)
- Majority: 3,614 (2018); 3,494 (2022)

Member of the Perak State Legislative Assembly for Changkat Jering
- In office 5 May 2013 – 9 May 2018
- Preceded by: Mohd Osman Mohd Jailu (PR–PKR)
- Succeeded by: Ahmad Saidi Mohamad Daud (BN–UMNO)
- Majority: 1,170 (2013)

Member of the Perak State Legislative Assembly for Pasir Panjang
- In office 8 March 2008 – 5 May 2013
- Preceded by: M. Ramachandran (BN–MIC)
- Succeeded by: Rashidi Ibrahim (BN–UMNO)
- Majority: 4,474 (2008)

Member of the Malaysian Parliament for Bukit Gantang
- In office 7 April 2009 – 5 May 2013
- Preceded by: Roslan Shaharum (PR–PAS)
- Succeeded by: Idris Ahmad (PR–PAS)
- Majority: 2,789 (2009)

Faction represented in Perak State Legislative Assembly
- 2008–2015: Malaysian Islamic Party
- 2015–2018: National Trust Party
- 2018–: Pakatan Harapan

Faction represented in Dewan Rakyat
- 2009–2013: Malaysian Islamic Party

Personal details
- Born: Mohammad Nizar bin Jamaluddin; 17 March 1957 (age 69) Kampar, Perak, Federation of Malaya (now Malaysia)
- Citizenship: Malaysian
- Party: Malaysian Islamic Party (PAS) (1995–2015); National Trust Party (AMANAH) (since 2015)
- Other political affiliations: Barisan Alternatif (BA) (1999–2004); Pakatan Rakyat (PR) (2008–2015); Pakatan Harapan (PH) (since 2015)
- Spouse: Fatimah Taat
- Children: 8
- Education: Aston University
- Occupation: Politician
- Profession: Engineer

Mohammad Nizar bin Jamaluddin (born 17 March 1957) is a Malaysian politician and engineer who has served as a member of the Perak State Executive Council since November 2022 under Saarani Mohamad and from May 2018 to March 2020 under Ahmad Faizal Azumu, and as a member of the Perak State Legislative Assembly for Sungai Rapat since May 2018. He previously served as the 10th Menteri Besar of Perak from March 2008 to the collapse of his administration in February 2009, represented Changkat Jering from May 2013 to May 2018 and Pasir Panjang from March 2008 to May 2013 in the legislative assembly, and represented Bukit Gantang in the Dewan Rakyat from April 2009 to May 2013.

He is a member of the National Trust Party (AMANAH), a component party of the Pakatan Harapan coalition, and was a member of the Malaysian Islamic Party (PAS). He is presently the sole member in the legislative assembly from AMANAH.

== Personal life ==
Nizar is the son of a Malay father and a Chinese mother, and was raised in a Malay-Muslim household. Nizar is married to Datin Seri Fatimah Taat with whom he has eight children. Since 2009 he has resided in Sungai Rokam, Perak. Prior to his current residence, he resided at the official residence for the Menteri Besar at Jalan Raja DiHilir.

Nizar is an engineering graduate from Aston University in Birmingham, United Kingdom.

== Political career ==
Mohammad Nizar Jamaluddin joined the Malaysian Islamic Party in 1995 and served as the Kampar district committee member of the Malaysian Islamic Party from 1999 to 2001, and then became the Kampar district chairman (2001 to ?). On the State Joint Committee, he served as treasurer from 2001 to 2006 and then as secretary. During the 2004 general election, Mohammad Nizar Jamaluddin ran for the Kuala Kangsar parliamentary constituency, but was defeated by his opponent Rafidah Aziz.

On 8 March 2008, the Pakatan Rakyat coalition in Perak won 31 seats of the 59 seat Perak State Legislative Assembly, which enabled it to form a majority state government. The Democratic Action Party (DAP) commanded the most seats out of the 31 seats held by Pakatan Rakyat and were the claimants to the post of Menteri Besar or the head of the state government. However, the Perak State Constitution stipulated that the Menteri Besar must be of Malay descent, and a non-Malay could only be appointed through royal waiver by the Perak Palace. To resolve this, all three parties sent their nominations for the position to the Regent of Perak, Raja Nazrin Shah. Nizar was chosen over Ngeh Koo Ham of the DAP and Jamaluddin Mohd Radzi of People's Justice Party (PKR) on 12 March 2008 by Raja Nazrin, and sworn in on 17 March 2008 at Istana Iskandariah, Kuala Kangsar. Nizar was the first person not part of the Barisan National coalition to be Menteri Besar in Perak.

The appointment of Nizar created a minor stir within the opposition coalition after the DAP's central executive committee, under the advice of former national chairman Lim Kit Siang, ordered DAP state assemblymen to boycott the swearing-in ceremony to be held on 13 March 2008. Raja Nazrin then ordered a delay of the swearing in ceremony and asked all 31 of Pakatan Rakyat's assemblymen to pledge their support for Nizar's appointment, as anything otherwise would mean Nizar lacked the confidence of a majority of the state assembly and could not be appointed Menteri Besar. Lim later apologised and said he did not mean to disrespect the decision of the Sultan and the regent of Perak. Following the resolution of this matter, all the state assemblymen from PKR, PAS and DAP (including Lim Kit Siang) attended the Menteri Besar swearing-in ceremony in support of Nizar.

Nizar's administration's decision to grant freehold titles to ethnic Chinese landholders in new village settlements garnered controversy and then-deputy prime minister Najib Razak disputed the act's legality, claiming the jurisdiction lied federally. His administration was heavily criticised on various issues by the Malaysian mainstream press, especially by Utusan Malaysia and Berita Harian, Malay-nationalist newspapers owned by the United Malays National Organisation (UMNO), a component party of Barisan Nasional and Nizar faced accusations of being a proxy for the DAP.

=== 2009 Perak constitutional crisis ===
In July 2008, former Menteri Besari Tajol Rosli Mohd Ghazali claimed that the Pakatan Rakyat state government in Perak would fall on 31 August 2008, Malaysia's Independence day, through defections to Barisan Nasional from the Pakatan Rakyat. Nizar dismissed Tajol's claims and remarked "Who is he (Tajol) to predict the future?".

On 25 January 2009, a Barisan Nasional assemblyman Nasarudin Hashim announced his defection PKR from UMNO, the second largest party in the state's Pakatan Rakyat coalition. Pakatan's leader and federal leader of the opposition Anwar Ibrahim claimed more would defect, a statement reaffirmed by Nizar who claimed that three more members from UMNO would defect.

However, the defection of three Pakatan assemblymen, including Nasarudin, to UMNO led to the fall of the Pakatan state government. A new state administration was sworn in with Zambry Abdul Kadir serving as the new Menteri Besar, but Nizar rejected the appointment and continued to conduct official duties. The speaker of the state assembly V. Sivakumar then suspended all Barisan executive councillors for "contempt of assembly" after a complaint was lodged by an assemblyman.

On 11 May 2009, the Kuala Lumpur High Court ruled that the Sultan could not constitutionally remove Nizar from office, and that Nizar had always been the rightful Menteri Besar. Nizar announced his intention to immediately meet with the Sultan to request dissolution of the state assembly, while Zambry Abdul Kadir, the intended Barisan Menteri Besar, stating he would vacate the state secretariat as soon as possible. However, in February 2010, the Federal Court reversed the High Court's decision and ruled Zambry to be the lawful Menteri Besar.

== Legal proceedings ==
=== 2014 criminal defamation charge ===
Nizar was charged in a nationwide dragnet in August 2014 for criminal defamation for allegedly making a speech in 2012 prior to the 2013 general election saying "I was informed that Najib will call all the army generals to do something if BN lost in the general election." The defamation case was settled on 26 July 2016, after Najib accepts Nizar's apology.

== Election results ==
Parliament of Malaysia
Year	Constituency	Candidate	Votes	Pct	Opponent(s)	Votes	Pct	Ballots cast	Majority	Turnout
2004	P067 Kuala Kangsar	Mohammad Nizar Jamaluddin (PAS)	6,747	33.43%	Rafidah Aziz (UMNO)	12,938	64.10%	20,184	6,191	71.09%
2009	P059 Bukit Gantang	Mohammad Nizar Jamaluddin (PAS)	21,860	52.50%	Ismail Safian (UMNO)	19,071	45.80%	41,626	2,789	75.00%
2009	P059 Bukit Gantang	Mohammad Nizar Jamaluddin (PAS)	21,860	52.50%	Kamarul Ramizu Idris (IND)	62	0.10%	41,626	2,789	75.00%

Perak State Legislative Assembly
Year	Constituency	Candidate	Votes	Pct	Opponent(s)	Votes	Pct	Ballots cast	Majority	Turnout
2008	N51 Pasir Panjang	Mohammad Nizar Jamaluddin (PAS)	11,994	62.81%	Vasan Sinnadurai (MIC)	7,520	39.38%	19,097	4,474	76.02%
2013	N14 Changkat Jering	Mohammad Nizar Jamaluddin (PAS)	14,495	51.28%	Rosli Husin (UMNO)	13,325	47.14%	28,264	1,170	85.40%
2013	N14 Changkat Jering	Mohammad Nizar Jamaluddin (PAS)	14,495	51.28%	Zulkifli Ibrahim (IND)	84	0.30%	28,264	1,170	85.40%
2018	N44 Sungai Rapat	Mohammad Nizar Jamaluddin (AMANAH)	12,425	47.16%	Hamzah Mohd Kasim (UMNO)	8,811	33.44%	26,346	3,614	82.60%
2018	N44 Sungai Rapat	Mohammad Nizar Jamaluddin (AMANAH)	12,425	47.16%	Radzi Zainon (PAS)	4,627	17.56%	26,346	3,614	82.60%
2022	N44 Sungai Rapat	Mohammad Nizar Jamaluddin (AMANAH)	15,065	41.91%	Mohader Ahmad Mohammad Ayob (BERSATU)	11,571	32.19%	35,942	3,494	74.99%
2022	N44 Sungai Rapat	Mohammad Nizar Jamaluddin (AMANAH)	15,065	41.91%	Hang Tuah Din (UMNO)	9,152	25.46%	35,942	3,494	74.99%
2022	N44 Sungai Rapat	Mohammad Nizar Jamaluddin (AMANAH)	15,065	41.91%	Roshanita Mohamad Basir (WARISAN)	154	0.43%	35,942	3,494	74.99%

== Honours ==
- Perak
  - Knight Grand Commander of the Order of the Perak State Crown (SPMP) – Dato' Seri (2008)

== Notes ==
Political offices
Preceded by Tajol Rosli Mohd Ghazali	Menteri Besar of Perak; 2008–2009	Succeeded by Zambry Abdul Kadir
