= Noor Azmi Ghazali =

Malaysian politician

Yang Berbahagia Dato' Dr. Noor Azmi Ghazali DPMP

Deputy Minister of Health I
- In office 30 August 2021 – 24 November 2022 Serving with Aaron Ago Dagang
- Monarch: Abdullah
- Prime Minister: Ismail Sabri Yaakob
- Minister: Khairy Jamaluddin
- Preceded by: Himself
- Succeeded by: Lukanisman Awang Sauni
- Constituency: Bagan Serai
- In office 10 March 2020 – 16 August 2021 Serving with Aaron Ago Dagang
- Monarch: Abdullah
- Prime Minister: Muhyiddin Yassin
- Minister: Adham Baba
- Preceded by: Lee Boon Chye
- Succeeded by: Himself
- Constituency: Bagan Serai

Chairman of the Malaysian Highway Authority
- In office 12 October 2016 – 11 October 2018
- Minister: Fadillah Yusof (2013–2018); Baru Bian (2018)
- Chief Executive Officer: Ismail Md. Salleh
- Preceded by: Ahmad Hamzah
- Succeeded by: Zohari Akob

Member of the Malaysian Parliament for Bagan Serai
- In office 5 May 2013 – 19 November 2022
- Preceded by: Mohsin Fadzli Samsuri (Independent)
- Succeeded by: Idris Ahmad (PN–PAS)
- Majority: 1,140 (2013); 172 (2018)

Faction represented in Dewan Rakyat
- 2013–2018: Barisan Nasional
- 2018: Independent
- 2018–2020: Pakatan Harapan
- 2020: Malaysian United Indigenous Party
- 2020–2022: Perikatan Nasional

Personal details
- Born: Noor Azmi bin Ghazali; 27 November 1960 (age 65) Bagan Serai, Perak, Federation of Malaya (now Malaysia)
- Citizenship: Malaysian
- Party: United Malays National Organisation (UMNO) (–2018); Independent (2018–2019); Malaysian United Indigenous Party (BERSATU) (since 2019)
- Other political affiliations: Barisan Nasional (BN) (–2018, aligned:since 2020); Pakatan Harapan (PH) (2019–2020); Perikatan Nasional (PN) (since 2020)
- Occupation: Politician
- Profession: Physician

Noor Azmi bin Ghazali (born 27 November 1960) is a Malaysian politician and physician who served as Deputy Minister of Health I for the second term in the Barisan Nasional (BN) administration under former Prime Minister Ismail Sabri Yaakob and former Minister Khairy Jamaluddin from August 2021 to the collapse of the BN administration in November 2022 and the first term in the Perikatan Nasional (PN) administration under former Prime Minister Muhyiddin Yassin and former Minister Adham Baba from March 2020 to the collapse of the BN administration in August 2021, Chairman of the Malaysian Highway Authority (LLM) from October 2016 to October 2018 as well as the Member of Parliament (MP) for Bagan Serai from May 2018 to November 2022. He is a member of the Malaysian United Indigenous Party (BERSATU), a component party of the PN coalition and was a member of the United Malays National Organisation (UMNO), a component party of the BN coalition. After the defeat of BN to Pakatan Harapan (PH) in the 2018 general election, he resigned from UMNO in 2018 and joined BERSATU in 2019.

== Political career ==
In May 2013, Azmi first contested to become an MP in the 13th Malaysian general election and subsequently won the Bagan Serai seat with a 1,140 majority. He was successfully re-elected as MP for the same seat in the 14th Malaysian general election, albeit with a razor-thin majority.

Azmi served as the Chairman of the Malaysian Highway Authority (LLM) between October 2016 and October 2018, replacing Jasin MP Ahmad Hamzah.

On 24 June 2018, following Barisan Nasional's spectacular fall from power in the aftermath of the 2018 Malaysian general election, Noor Azmi announced his resignation from United Malays National Organisation (UMNO) and became an independent. Following months of speculation, it was announced on 28 November 2018 that he has joined PPBM, one of component parties of the ruling Pakatan Harapan (PH) coalition together with four Senators.

On 9 March 2020, he was appointed by Prime Minister Muhyiddin Yassin to serve his cabinet as Deputy Minister of Health with Aaron Ago Dagang. He was involved in controversy event like violating MCO by having lunch together with around 30 people include Perak EXCO member Razman Zakaria, later both of them had apologized for their acts.

== Election results ==
Parliament of Malaysia
Year	Constituency	Candidate	Votes	Pct	Opponent(s)	Votes	Pct	Ballots cast	Majority	Turnout
2013	P058 Bagan Serai	Noor Azmi Ghazali (UMNO)	23,014	50.90%	Mohd Nor R. M. Monutty (PKR)	21,874	48.38%	46,386	1,140	84.66%
2013	P058 Bagan Serai	Noor Azmi Ghazali (UMNO)	23,014	50.90%	Abd Latiff Mas'ud (IND)	329	0.73%	46,386	1,140	84.66%
2018	P058 Bagan Serai	Noor Azmi Ghazali (UMNO)	17,220	36.44%	Rohaya Bakar (PAS)	17,048	36.08%	48,381	172	81.60%
2018	P058 Bagan Serai	Noor Azmi Ghazali (UMNO)	17,220	36.44%	Adam Asmuni (BERSATU)	12,987	27.48%	48,381	172	81.60%

== Honours ==
- Perak
  - Knight Commander of the Order of the Perak State Crown (DPMP) – Dato' (2016)

== See also ==
- Bagan Serai (federal constituency)
