= Chua Yee Ling =

Malaysian politician

- 蔡依霖

CEO of the Tourism Selangor
- Incumbent
- Assumed office 9 January 2025
- Preceded by: Azrul Shah Mohamad

Member of the Perak State Legislative Assembly for Kuala Sapetang
- In office 5 May 2013 – 9 May 2018
- Preceded by: Tai Sing Ng (PR–PKR)
- Succeeded by: Mohd Kamaruddin Abu Bakar (BN–UMNO)
- Majority: 758 (2013)

Personal details
- Party: People's Justice Party (PKR)
- Other political affiliations: Pakatan Harapan (PH)
- Occupation: Politician

Chua Yee Ling is a Malaysian politician who served as CEO of the Tourism Selangor since January 2025 as well as Member of the Perak State Legislative Assembly (MLA) for Kuala Sapetang from May 2013 to May 2018. She is a member of People's Justice Party (PKR), a component party of Pakatan Harapan (PH) coalitions.

== Election results ==
Parliament of Malaysia
Year	Constituency	Candidate	Votes	Pct	Opponent(s)	Votes	Pct	Ballots cast	Majority	Turnout
2013	N13 Kuala Sapetang	Chua Yee Ling (PKR)	10,775	50.77%	Loh Swee Eng (Gerakan)	10,017	47.20%	21,642	758	86.18%
2013	N13 Kuala Sapetang	Chua Yee Ling (PKR)	10,775	50.77%	Zainal Abidin Abdul Rahman (BERJASA)	430	2.03%	21,642	758	86.18%
2013	N13 Kuala Sepetang	Chua Yee Ling (PKR)	8,664	36.17%	Mohd Kamaruddin Abu Bakar (UMNO)	8,993	37.54%	24,363	329	83.17%
2013	N13 Kuala Sepetang	Chua Yee Ling (PKR)	8,664	36.17%	Rahim Ismail (PAS)	6,296	26.28%	24,363	329	83.17%
