= Yahaya Mat Nor =

Malaysian politician

- يحيى مت نور

Member of the Perak State Legislative Assembly for Pasir Panjang
- In office 9 May 2018 – 19 November 2022
- Preceded by: Rashidi Ibrahim

Personal details
- Born: Yahaya bin Mat Nor Sitiawan, Perak
- Citizenship: Malaysian
- Party: AMANAH
- Other political affiliations: Pakatan Harapan
- Education: SMK Methodist; University of Malaya
- Occupation: Teacher; Airplane Technician; Politician

Yahaya bin Mat Nor is a Malaysian politician from AMANAH. He is the Member of Perak State Legislative Assembly for Pasir Panjang from 2018 to 2022.

== Politics ==
He is the Deputy Chairman of AMANAH Lumut Branch.

== Election results ==
Perak State Legislative Assembly
Year	Constituency	Candidate	Votes	Pct	Opponent(s)	Votes	Pct	Ballots cast	Majority	Turnout
2018	N51 Pasir Panjang	Yahaya Mat Nor (AMANAH)	14,123	39.79%	Rashidi Ibrahim (UMNO)	12,904	36.36%	35,494	1,219	83.71%
2018	N51 Pasir Panjang	Yahaya Mat Nor (AMANAH)	14,123	39.79%	Rohawati Abidin (PAS)	7,795	21.96%	35,494	1,219	83.71%
2022	N51 Pasir Panjang	Yahaya Mat Nor (AMANAH)	15,065	30.64%	Rosli Abd Rahman (PAS)	20,182	41.05%	49,951	5,117	80.03%
2022	N51 Pasir Panjang	Yahaya Mat Nor (AMANAH)	15,065	30.64%	Mohd Rafiq Mohd (UMNO)	13,301	27.06%	49,951	5,117	80.03%
2022	N51 Pasir Panjang	Yahaya Mat Nor (AMANAH)	15,065	30.64%	Mohd Norazlee Mohd (PEJUANG)	339	0.69%	49,951	5,117	80.03%
2022	N51 Pasir Panjang	Yahaya Mat Nor (AMANAH)	15,065	30.64%	Nur Inderasyawalis Ahmad Mukhtar (WARISAN)	274	0.56%	49,951	5,117	80.03%
