= Changkat Jering (state constituency) =

Political subdivision in Malaysia

Changkat Jering (N14)
Perak constituency

State constituency
- Legislature: Perak State Legislative Assembly
MLA
Rahim Ismail
PN
- Constituency created: 1974
- First contested: 1974
- Last contested: 2022

Demographics
- Electors (2018): 37,003

Changkat Jering is a state constituency in Perak, Malaysia, that has been represented in the Perak State Legislative Assembly.

== Demographics ==
Ethnic breakdown of Changkat Jering's electorate as of 2022
1. Malay (72.4%)
2. Chinese (16.9%)
3. Indian (9.93%)
4. Other ethnicities (0.75%)

== History ==
=== Polling districts ===
According to the federal gazette issued on 31 October 2022, the Changkat Jering constituency is divided into 9 polling districts.

State constituency	Polling Districts	Code	Location
Changkat Jering (N14）	Larut Tin	059/14/01	SRA Rakyat Madrasah Al Khairiah Addinah; Dewan Orang Ramai Kg Larut Tin
Changkat Jering (N14）	Kawasan J.K.R	059/14/02	SJK (T) Ladang Holyrood; SRA Rakyat Al Hashimiah Pengkalan Aur
Changkat Jering (N14）	Jalan Simpang	059/14/03	SA Rakyat Al-Irshadiah; SK Pengkalan Aur
Changkat Jering (N14）	Simpang Lama	059/14/04	SRA Rakyat An-Nur; SMK Simpang
Changkat Jering (N14）	Ayer Kuning	059/14/05	SK Changkat Larut; SMK Pengkalan Aur
Changkat Jering (N14）	Changkat Jering	059/14/06	SK Changkat Jering
Changkat Jering (N14）	Jelutong	059/14/07	SK Jelutong
Changkat Jering (N14）	Bukit Gantang	059/14/08	SK Dato Panglima Bukit Gantang
Changkat Jering (N14）	Kampong Cheh	059/14/09	SK Sultan Abdullah

=== Representation history ===
Members of the Perak State Assembly for Changkat Jering
Assembly	No	Years	Member	Party
Constituency created from Matang and Taiping
4th	N13	1974 – 1978	Ang Chin Wah (洪振華)	BN (GERAKAN)
5th	N13	1978 – 1982	Ang Chin Wah (洪振華)	BN (GERAKAN)
6th	N13	1982 – 1986	Cheong Kai Foo (張啟夫)	BN (GERAKAN)
7th	N10	1986 – 1990	Mohamad Razlan Abdul Hamid	BN (UMNO)
8th	N10	1990 – 1995	Mohamad Razlan Abdul Hamid	BN (UMNO)
9th	N11	1995 – 1997	Mohamad Razlan Abdul Hamid	BN (UMNO)
9th	N11	1997 – 1999	Mat Isa Ismail	BN (UMNO)
10th	N11	1999 – 2004	Mat Isa Ismail	BN (UMNO)
11th	N14	2004 – 2008	Mat Isa Ismail	BN (UMNO)
12th	N14	2008 – 2009	Mohd Osman Mohd Jailu	PR (PKR)
12th	N14	2009 – 2013	Mohd Osman Mohd Jailu	Independent
13th	N14	2013 – 2015	Mohammad Nizar Jamaluddin	PR (PAS)
13th	N14	2015–2018	Mohammad Nizar Jamaluddin	AMANAH
14th	N14	2018 – 2022	Ahmad Saidi Mohamad Daud	BN (UMNO)
15th	N14	2022–present	Rahim Ismail	PN (PAS)

== Election results ==
Perak state election, 2022
Party	Candidate	Votes	%	∆%
PN	Rahim Ismail	11,790	41.89	▲41.89
BN	Ahmad Saidi Mohamad Daud	8,639	30.69	▼9.44
PH	Megat Shariffudin Ibrahim	7,511	26.68	▲26.68
PEJUANG	Nazar Talib	208	0.74	▲0.74
Total valid votes		28,604	100.00	
Total rejected ballots		385		
Unreturned ballots		71		
Turnout		29,060	77.30	▼5.87
Registered electors		37,003		
Majority		3,151	11.20	▲2.45
PN gain from BN		Swing		?

Perak state election, 2018
Party	Candidate	Votes	%	∆%
BN	Ahmad Saidi Mohamad Daud	8,818	40.13	▼7.77
PKR	Megat Shariffudin Ibrahim	6,896	31.38	▲31.38
PAS	Mohammad Nordin Jaafar	6,199	28.21	▼23.89
Independent	Mohganan P Manikam	60	0.27	▲0.27
Total valid votes		21,973	98.41	
Total rejected ballots		250	1.12	
Unreturned ballots		106	0.47	
Turnout		22,329	83.17	▼2.23
Registered electors		26,848		
Majority		1,922	8.75	▲5.37
BN gain from PAS		Swing		?
Source(s) "RESULTS OF CONTESTED ELECTION AND STATEMENTS OF THE POLL AFTER THE OFFICIAL ADDITION OF VOTES".

Perak state election, 2013
Party	Candidate	Votes	%	∆%
PAS	Mohammad Nizar Jamaluddin	14,495	52.10	▲52.10
BN	Rosli Husin	13,325	47.90	▲1.01
Independent	Zulkefli Ibrahim	84	0.30	▲0.30
Total valid votes		27,820	98.43	
Total rejected ballots		281	0.99	
Unreturned ballots		79	0.28	
Turnout		28,264	85.40	▲12.55
Registered electors		33,095		
Majority		1,170	3.38	▼2.84
PAS gain from PKR		Swing		?
Source(s) "KEPUTUSAN PILIHAN RAYA UMUM DEWAN UNDANGAN NEGERI". Archived from the original on 2013-05-08.

Perak state election, 2008
Party	Candidate	Votes	%	∆%
PKR	Mohd Osman Mohd Jailu	9,411	53.11	▲53.11
BN	Mat Isa Ismail	8,309	46.89	▼16.98
Total valid votes		17,720	97.82	
Total rejected ballots		334	1.84	
Unreturned ballots		60	0.33	
Turnout		18,114	72.85	▲0.38
Registered electors		24,864		
Majority		1,102	6.22	▼21.52
PKR gain from BN		Swing		?
Source(s) "KEPUTUSAN PILIHAN RAYA UMUM DEWAN UNDANGAN NEGERI PERAK BAGI TAHUN 2008".

Perak state election, 2004
Party	Candidate	Votes	%	∆%
BN	Mat Isa Ismail	10,966	63.87	▲6.88
PAS	Mohammad Nordin Jaafar	6,202	36.13	▼6.88
Total valid votes		17,168	98.12	
Total rejected ballots		321	1.83	
Unreturned ballots		8	0.05	
Turnout		17,497	72.47	▲2.35
Registered electors		24,143		
Majority		4,764	27.74	▲13.76
BN hold		Swing		
Source(s) "KEPUTUSAN PILIHAN RAYA UMUM DEWAN UNDANGAN NEGERI PERAK BAGI TAHUN 2004".

Perak state election, 1999
Party	Candidate	Votes	%	∆%
BN	Mat Isa Ismail	8,127	56.99	▼18.71
PAS	Idris Ahmad	6,133	43.01	▲18.71
Total valid votes		14,260	97.65	
Total rejected ballots		319	2.18	
Unreturned ballots		24	0.16	
Turnout		14,603	70.12	▼0.07
Registered electors		20,827		
Majority		1,994	13.98	▼37.20
BN hold		Swing		
Source(s) "KEPUTUSAN PILIHAN RAYA UMUM DEWAN UNDANGAN NEGERI PERAK BAGI TAHUN 1999".

Perak state election, 1995
Party	Candidate	Votes	%	∆%
BN	Mohamad Razlan Abdul Hamid	9,429	75.70	▲14.08
PAS	Hawari Che Teh	3,027	24.50	▼14.08
Total valid votes		12,456	94.38	
Total rejected ballots		371	2.81	
Unreturned ballots		371	2.81	
Turnout		13,198	70.19	▼0.86
Registered electors		18,802		
Majority		6,402	51.20	▼27.96
BN hold		Swing		
Source(s) "KEPUTUSAN PILIHAN RAYA UMUM DEWAN UNDANGAN NEGERI PERAK BAGI TAHUN 1995".

Perak state election, 1990
Party	Candidate	Votes	%	∆%
BN	Mohamad Razlan Abdul Hamid	9,507	61.62	▼1.08
PAS	Azizan Iamail	5,922	38.38	▲1.08
Total valid votes		15,429	97.23	
Total rejected ballots		439	2.77	
Unreturned ballots		0	0	
Turnout		15,868	71.05	▲4.56
Registered electors		22,333		
Majority		3,585	23.24	▼1.16
BN hold		Swing		
Source(s) "KEPUTUSAN PILIHAN RAYA UMUM DEWAN UNDANGAN NEGERI PERAK BAGI TAHUN 1990".

Perak state election, 1986
Party	Candidate	Votes	%	∆%
BN	Mohamad Razlan Abdul Hamid	8,409	62.70	▲62.90
PAS	Ghazali Abdullah	4,960	38.30	▲22.63
Total valid votes		13,369	100.00	
Total rejected ballots		526		
Unreturned ballots		0		
Turnout		13,895	66.49	▼9.17
Registered electors		20,899		
Majority		3,449	25.80	▼12.30
BN hold		Swing		
Source(s) "KEPUTUSAN PILIHAN RAYA UMUM DEWAN UNDANGAN NEGERI PERAK BAGI TAHUN 1986".

Perak state election, 1982
Party	Candidate	Votes	%	∆%
BN	Cheong Kai Fu	9,415	61.81	▲4.49
DAP	Yip Wah	3,612	23.71	▼4.71
PAS	Jaafar Mat Arif	2,204	14.47	▲0.22
Total valid votes		15,231	100.00	
Total rejected ballots		364		
Unreturned ballots		0		
Turnout		15,595	75.65	▼1.90
Registered electors		20,614		
Majority		5,803	38.10	▲9.19
BN hold		Swing		

Perak state election, 1978
Party	Candidate	Votes	%	∆%
BN	Ang Chin Wah	7,806	57.33	▲0.08
DAP	Yahaya Yaacob	3,870	28.42	▲3.04
PAS	Ahmad Abdullah	1,940	14.25	▲14.25
Total valid votes		13,616	100.00	
Total rejected ballots		559		
Unreturned ballots		0		
Turnout		14,175	77.55	▲5.17
Registered electors		18,278		
Majority		3,936	28.91	▼2.97
BN hold		Swing		

Perak state election, 1974
Party	Candidate	Votes	%
BN	Ang Chin Wah	5,861	57.25
DAP	Mohd Fadzlan Yahya	2,598	25.38
Independent	Chuah Chong Hee	1,496	14.61
PEKEMAS	Chou Chong Leng	282	2.75
Total valid votes		10,237	100.00
Total rejected ballots		631	
Unreturned ballots		0	
Turnout		10,868	72.39
Registered electors		15,014	
Majority		3,263	31.87
This was a new constituency created.
