= Muhammad Faiz Fadzil =

Malaysian politician

- محمّد فائز فاضل

Chairman of the Fisheries Development Authority of Malaysia
- Incumbent
- Assumed office 15 May 2023
- Minister: Mohamad Sabu
- Preceded by: Syed Abu Hussin Hafiz
- In office 2018–2020
- Minister: Salahuddin Ayub
- Preceded by: Irmohizam Ibrahim
- Succeeded by: Syed Abu Hussin Hafiz

3rd Secretary-General of the National Trust Party
- Incumbent
- Assumed office 7 January 2024
- President: Mohamad Sabu
- Deputy: Norhayati Bidin
- Preceded by: Mohd Hatta Ramli

Member of the Penang State Legislative Assembly for Permatang Pasir
- In office 9 May 2018 – 12 August 2023
- Preceded by: Mohd Salleh Man (PR–PAS)
- Succeeded by: Amir Hamzah Abdul Hashim (PN–PAS)
- Majority: 2,981 (2018)

Personal details
- Born: Muhammad Faiz bin Fadzil; 21 April 1977 (age 49) Kedah, Malaysia
- Citizenship: Malaysian
- Party: National Trust Party (AMANAH)
- Other political affiliations: Pakatan Harapan (PH)
- Spouse: Noralis Mat
- Relations: Ahmad Fauwaz Fadzil (younger brother)
- Children: Farah A’Lia; Fadzil Zikri
- Parent: Fadzil Noor (father)
- Education: International Islamic University Malaysia (IIUM)
- Occupation: Politician
- Profession: Lawyer

Muhammad Faiz bin Fadzil is a Malaysian politician who has served as Chairman of the Fisheries Development Authority of Malaysia (LKIM) since May 2023 and from 2018 to 2020. He served as the Member of the Penang State Legislative Assembly (MLA) for Permatang Pasir from May 2018 to August 2023. He is a member of the National Trust Party (AMANAH), a component party of the Pakatan Harapan (PH) coalition. He has also served as the 3rd Secretary-General of AMANAH since January 2024. He is the son of Fadzil Noor, former Leader of the Opposition and former President of the Malaysian Islamic Party (PAS).

== Career ==
He has built a successful legal career, having been called to the Bar in 2002, and has over 20 years of practice experience. He is also the owner of the law firm Faiz Fadzil & Co, located in Seremban, Negeri Sembilan.

He is the Chairman of Lembaga Kemajuan Ikan Malaysia replacing Irmohizam Ibrahim in 2018 and was replaced by Syed Abu Hussin Hafiz in 2020. He was reappointed as Chairman since 15 May 2023 for a period of 3 years.

== Politics ==
He is a member of AMANAH National Committee for 2019-2022. During the party's National Leadership Committee meeting on 7 January 2024, he was appointed as the new Secretary-General, replacing Dr Hatta Ramli who was promoted to become a Vice President.

He is seen as the future leader to replace Mohamad Sabu and Mahfuz Omar in AMANAH to spread moderate Islam, following his father, Fadzil Noor's will.

== Personal life ==
He is the son of former President of PAS, Fadzil Noor.

== Election results ==
Parliament of Malaysia
Year	Constituency	Candidate	Votes	Pct	Opponent(s)	Votes	Pct	Ballots cast	Majority	Turnout
2022	P133 Tampin	Muhammad Faiz Fadzil (AMANAH)	22,007	36.03%	Mohd Isam Mohd Isa (UMNO)	23,283	38.15%	61,033	1,276	75.26%
2022	P133 Tampin	Muhammad Faiz Fadzil (AMANAH)	22,007	36.03%	Abdul Halim Abu Bakar (PAS)	14,962	24.51%	61,033	1,276	75.26%
2022	P133 Tampin	Muhammad Faiz Fadzil (AMANAH)	22,007	36.03%	Zamani Ibrahim (PEJUANG)	781	1.28%	61,033	1,276	75.26%

Penang State Legislative Assembly
Year	Constituency	Candidate	Votes	Pct	Opponent(s)	Votes	Pct	Ballots cast	Majority	Turnout
2018	N11 Permatang Pasir	Muhammad Faiz Fadzil (AMANAH)	9,708	44.82%	Muhammad Fauzi Yusoff (PAS)	6,727	31.06%	21,605	2,981	87.30%
2018	N11 Permatang Pasir	Muhammad Faiz Fadzil (AMANAH)	9,708	44.82%	Anuar Faisal Yahaya (UMNO)	4,979	22.99%	21,605	2,981	87.30%
2023	N11 Permatang Pasir	Muhammad Faiz Fadzil (AMANAH)	10,418	43.51%	Amir Hamzah Abdul Hashim (PAS)	13,526	56.49%	24,046	3,108	79.01%
