= Mohsin Fadzli Samsuri =

Malaysian politician (1945–2022)

Mohsin Fadzli Samsuri PCM
- محسين فضلي شمسوري

Member of the Malaysian Parliament for Bagan Serai
- In office 8 March 2008 – 5 May 2013
- Preceded by: Zainal Abidin Zin (BN–UMNO)
- Succeeded by: Noor Azmi Ghazali (BN–UMNO)
- Majority: 3,413 (2008)

Personal details
- Born: 30 November 1945 Perak, British Malaya (now Malaysia)
- Died: 10 March 2022 (aged 76)
- Party: People's Justice Party (PKR) (–2010); Independent (2010–2022)
- Other political affiliations: Pakatan Rakyat (PR) (2008–2010)
- Occupation: Politician

Mohsin Fadzli Samsuri (30 November 1945 – 10 March 2022) was a Malaysian politician who served as the Member of Parliament (MP) for Bagan Serai from March 2008 to May 2013. He was an independent and a member of the People's Justice Party (PKR), a component party of formerly Pakatan Rakyat (PR) coalition.

Mohsin was elected to Parliament in the 2008 general election, winning the seat of Bagan Serai from Deputy Minister Zainal Abidin Zin of Barisan Nasional (BN). He was elected on the ticket of the People's Justice Party (PKR) but quit the party in March 2010 to sit as an independent, saying he felt "betrayed and sabotaged". His resignation from PKR followed the resignations of fellow PKR members of parliament Zahrain Mohamed Hashim and Tan Tee Beng. He did not contest the 2013 election.

== Election results ==
Parliament of Malaysia
| Year | Constituency | Candidate | Votes | Pct | Opponent(s) | Votes | Pct | Ballots cast | Majority | Turnout |
|---|---|---|---|---|---|---|---|---|---|---|
| 2008 | P058 Bagan Serai | Mohsin Fadzli Samsuri (PKR) | 18,943 | 54.95% | Zainal Abidin Zin (UMNO) | 15,530 | 45.05% | 36,237 | 3,413 | 76.92% |

== Honours ==
- Perak
  - Commander of the Order of Cura Si Manja Kini (PCM) (2011)

== Death ==
Mohsin Fadzli died on 10 March 2022.
