= Amir Hamzah Abdul Hashim =

Malaysian politician

Yang Berhormat Tuan Haji Amir Hamzah Abdul Hashim MLA
- أمير حمزه عبدالهاشم

Member of the Penang State Legislative Assembly for Permatang Pasir
- Incumbent
- Assumed office 12 August 2023
- Preceded by: Muhammad Faiz Fadzil (PH–AMANAH)
- Majority: 3,108 (2023)

Personal details
- Born: Amir Hamzah bin Abdul Hashim
- Citizenship: Malaysian
- Party: PAS
- Other political affiliations: Perikatan Nasional
- Occupation: Politician

Amir Hamzah bin Abdul Hashim is a Malaysian politician from PAS. He is a member of Penang State Legislative Assembly representing Permatang Pasir since 2023.

== Political career ==
Amir Hamzah is currently the Deputy Chief of PAS Permatang Pasir branch.

== Election results ==
Penang State Legislative Assembly
Year	Constituency	Candidate	Votes	Pct	Opponent(s)	Votes	Pct.	Ballots cast	Majority	Turnout
2023	N11 Permatang Pasir	Amir Hamzah Abdul Hashim (PAS)	13,526	56.49%	Muhammad Faiz Fadzil (AMANAH)	10,418	43.51%	24,046	3,108	79.01%
