= Tai Sing Ng =

Malaysian politician

- 戴成银

Member of the Perak State Legislative Assembly for Kuala Sepetang
- In office 2008–2013
- Preceded by: See Tean Seng
- Succeeded by: Chua Yee Ling

Personal details
- Born: Tai Sing Ng
- Citizenship: Malaysian
- Party: PKR
- Other political affiliations: Pakatan Rakyat
- Occupation: Politician

Chinese name
- Traditional Chinese: 戴成銀
- Simplified Chinese: 戴成银
Transcriptions
Standard Mandarin
- Hanyu Pinyin: Dài Chéngyín
Hakka
- Pha̍k-fa-sṳ: Tai Sìn-ngiùn
Yue: Cantonese
- Jyutping: Daai3 Sing4 Ngan4
Southern Min
- Hokkien POJ: Tè Sêng-gîn
- Tâi-lô: Tè Sîng-gîn

Tai Sing Ng is a Malaysian politician from PKR. He was the Member of Perak State Legislative Assembly for Kuala Sepetang from 2008 to 2013.

== Election result ==
Perak State Legislative Assembly
Year	Constituency	Candidate	Votes	Pct.	Opponent(s)	Votes	Pct.	Ballots cast	Majority	Turnout
2008	N13 Kuala Sepetang	Tai Sing Ng (PKR)	7,285	50.26%	See Tean Seng (Gerakan)	6,721	46.36%	14,496	564	73.59%
