= Zainal Abidin Zin =

Malaysian politician

Yang Berbahagia Dato' Zainal Abidin Zin DPMP DSAP PMP
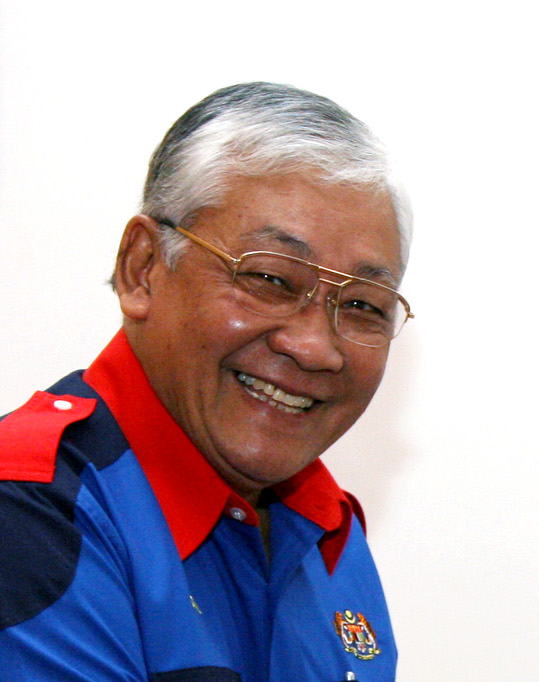

Deputy Minister of Defence
- In office 27 March 2004 – 18 March 2008
- Monarchs: Sirajuddin; Mizan Zainal Abidin
- Prime Minister: Abdullah Ahmad Badawi
- Minister: Najib Razak

Deputy Minister of Home Affairs
- In office 15 December 1999 – 26 March 2004
- Monarchs: Salahuddin; Sirajuddin
- Prime Minister: Mahathir Mohamad; Abdullah Ahmad Badawi
- Minister: Mahathir Mohamad; Abdullah Ahmad Badawi

Deputy Minister of Energy, Telecommunications and Posts
- In office 11 August 1986 – 7 May 1987
- Monarchs: Iskandar; Azlan Shah
- Prime Minister: Mahathir Mohamad
- Minister: Leo Moggie Irok

Deputy Minister of Works
- In office 16 July 1984 – 10 August 1986
- Monarchs: Ahmad Shah; Iskandar
- Prime Minister: Mahathir Mohamad
- Minister: Samy Vellu

Parliamentary Secretary of the Ministry of Lands and Regional Development
- In office 1982–1984
- Monarch: Ahmad Shah
- Prime Minister: Mahathir Mohamad
- Minister: Rais Yatim; Mohd. Adib Mohd. Adam
- Deputy Minister: None

Member of the Malaysian Parliament for Bagan Serai
- In office 29 November 1999 – 8 March 2008
- Preceded by: Qamaruzaman Ismail (BN–UMNO)
- Succeeded by: Mohsin Fadzli Samsuri (PR–PKR)
- In office 1982–1990
- Preceded by: Ramli Omar (BN–UMNO)
- Succeeded by: Qamaruzaman Ismail (BN–UMNO)

Personal details
- Born: 7 March 1940 (age 86) Gunung Semanggol, Perak, British Malaya (now Malaysia)
- Citizenship: Malaysian
- Party: United Malays National Organisation (UMNO) (until 1989; 1996–present); Parti Melayu Semangat 46 (S46) (1989-1996)
- Other political affiliations: Angkatan Perpaduan Ummah (APU) (1990-1996); Gagasan Rakyat (GR) (1990-1996); Barisan Nasional (BN) (Until 1989; 1996-present)
- Spouse: Datin Asima Abdul Latif
- Children: 3
- Education: Universiti Sains Malaysia (USM)
- Occupation: Politician

Zainal Abidin bin Zin (born 7 March 1940) is a Malaysian politician who served as Deputy Minister of Defence from 2004 to 2008 and Deputy Minister of Home Affairs from 1999 to 2004.

== Election results ==
Parliament of Malaysia
Year	Constituency	Candidate	Votes	Pct	Opponent(s)	Votes	Pct	Ballots cast	Majority	Turnout
1982	P047 Bagan Serai	Zainal Abidin Zin (UMNO)	16,151	62.46%	Abdul Kadir Kahar (PAS)	9,708	37.54%	27,007	6,443	74.32%
1986	P052 Bagan Serai	Zainal Abidin Zin (UMNO)	16,508	63.36%	Rahmat Husin (PAS)	9,548	36.64%	26,936	6,960	68.49%
1990	P052 Bagan Serai	Zainal Abidin Zin (S46)	11,822	44.37%	Qamaruzaman Ismail (UMNO)	14,824	55.63%	27,699	3,002	71.33%
1995	P055 Bagan Serai	Zainal Abidin Zin (S46)	10,184	38.26%	Qamaruzaman Ismail (UMNO)	16,434	61.74%	28,251	6,250	67.55%
1999	P055 Bagan Serai	Zainal Abidin Zin (UMNO)	15,088	52.77%	Ahmad Awang (PAS)	13,504	47.23%	29,507	1,584	65.73%
2004	P058 Bagan Serai	Zainal Abidin Zin (UMNO)	19,827	58.25%	Ahmad Awang (PAS)	14,209	41.75%	35,076	5,618	73.47%
2008	P058 Bagan Serai	Zainal Abidin Zin (UMNO)	15,530	45.05%	Mohsin Fadzli Samsuri (PKR)	18,943	54.95%	36,237	3,413	76.92%

== Honours ==
- Perak
  - Commander of the Order of the Perak State Crown (PMP) (1982)
  - Knight Commander of the Order of the Perak State Crown (DPMP) – Dato' (1985)
- Pahang
  - Knight Companion of the Order of Sultan Ahmad Shah of Pahang (DSAP) – Dato' (2002)

Several places were named after him, including:

- Dewan Dato' Zainal Abidin Zin, Bagan Serai, Perak.
