= Permatang Pasir (state constituency) =

State constituency in Penang, Malaysia

Permatang Pasir (N11)
Penang constituency

State constituency
- Legislature: Penang State Legislative Assembly
MLA
Amir Hamzah Abdul Hashim
PN
- Constituency created: 1986
- First contested: 1986
- Last contested: 2023

Demographics
- Electors (2023): 30,464
- Area (km²): 29

Permatang Pasir is a state constituency in Penang, Malaysia, that has been represented in the Penang State Legislative Assembly. It has been represented by Amir Hamzah Abdul Hashim of Perikatan Nasional (PN) since 2023.

The state constituency was first contested in 1986 and is mandated to return a single Assemblyman to the Penang State Legislative Assembly under the first-past-the-post voting system. Prime Minister Anwar Ibrahim is a constituent and voter of Permatang Pasir.

== Definition ==
=== Polling districts ===
According to the federal gazette issued on 30 March 2018, the Permatang Pasir constituency is divided into 9 polling districts.

State constituency	Polling districts	Code	Location
Permatang Pasir (N11)	Sama Gagah	044/11/01	SMK Sama Gagah
Permatang Pasir (N11)	Permatang Ara	044/11/02	SK Permatang Pasir
Permatang Pasir (N11)	Permatang Pauh	044/11/03	SK Permatang Pauh
Permatang Pasir (N11)	Bukit Indra Muda	044/11/04	SK Bukit Indera Muda
Permatang Pasir (N11)	Kampong Pelet	044/11/05	SJK (C) Kubang Semang
Permatang Pasir (N11)	Kubang Semang	044/11/06	SK Seri Penanti
Permatang Pasir (N11)	Tanah Liat Mukim 8	044/11/07	SK Seri Penanti
Permatang Pasir (N11)	Kampong Cross Street 2	044/11/08	SM Islam Al-Masriyah
Permatang Pasir (N11)	Permatang Pauh	044/11/09	SJK (C) Lay Keow

== Demographics ==
Ethnic breakdown of Permatang Pasir's electorate as of 2023
1. Malay (75.4%)
2. Chinese (22.1%)
3. Indian (2.13%)
4. Other ethnicities (0.41%)

Total electors by polling district in 2016
Polling district	Electors
Sama Gagah	3,069
Permatang Ara	3,849
Permatang Pauh	1,862
Bukit Indra Muda	3,250
Kampong Pelet	2,123
Kubang Semang	1,629
Tanah Liat Mukim 8	3,254
Kampong Cross Street 2	1,434
Permatang Tengah	3,113
Total	23,583
Source: Malaysian Election Commission

== History ==
Penang State Legislative Assembly man for Permatang Pasir
Assembly	No	Years	Member	Party
Constituency created from Kubang Semang
7th	N11	1986 – 1990	Adnan Ramli	BN (UMNO)
8th	N11	1990 – 1995	Adnan Ramli	BN (UMNO)
9th	N11	1995 – 1999	Ahmad Saad	BN (UMNO)
10th	N11	1999 – 2004	Mohd Hamdan Abdul Rahman	BA (PAS)
11th	N11	2004 – 2008	Mohd Hamdan Abdul Rahman	PAS
12th	N11	2008 – 2009	Mohd Hamdan Abdul Rahman	PR (PAS)
12th	N11	2009 - 2013	Mohd Salleh Man	PR (PAS)
13th	N11	2013 – 2018	Mohd Salleh Man	PR (PAS)
14th	N11	2018 – 2023	Muhammad Faiz Fadzil	PH (AMANAH)
15th	N11	2023–present	Amir Hamzah Abdul Hashim	PN (PAS)

== Election results ==
Penang state election, 2023
Party	Candidate	Votes	%	∆%
PN	Amir Hamzah Abdul Hashim	13,526	56.49	▲56.49
PH	Muhammad Faiz Fadzil	10,418	43.51	▼1.79
Total valid votes		23,944	100.00	
Total rejected ballots		102		
Unreturned ballots		24		
Turnout		24,070	79.01	▼8.29
Registered electors		30,464		
Majority		3,108	12.98	▼0.92
PN gain from PKR		Swing		?

Penang state election, 2018
Party	Candidate	Votes	%	∆%
PKR	Muhammad Faiz Fadzil	9,708	45.30	▲45.30
PAS	Muhammad Fauzi Yusoff	6,727	31.40	▼35.60
BN	Anuar Faisal Yahaya	4,979	23.30	▼9.70
Total valid votes		21,414	100.00	
Total rejected ballots		191		
Unreturned ballots		54		
Turnout		21,659	87.30	▼1.50
Registered electors		24,811		
Majority		2,981	13.90	▼20.10
PKR gain from PAS		Swing		?
Source(s) "His Majesty's Government Gazette - Notice of Contested Election, State Legislative Assembly for the State of Penang [P.U. (B) 252/2018]" (PDF). Attorney General's Chambers of Malaysia. 3 May 2018. "Federal Government Gazette - Results of Contested Election and Statements of the Poll after the Official Addition of Votes, State Constituencies for the State of Penang [P.U. (B) 326/2018]" (PDF). Attorney General's Chambers of Malaysia. 28 May 2018. Archived from the original (PDF) on 29 August 2019.

Penang state election, 2013
Party	Candidate	Votes	%	∆%
PAS	Mohd Salleh Man	13,479	67.00	▲1.50
BN	Anuar Faisal Yahaya	6,653	33.00	▼1.50
Total valid votes		20,132	100.00	
Total rejected ballots		207		
Unreturned ballots		0		
Turnout		20,339	88.80	▲16.01
Registered electors		22,905		
Majority		6,826	34.00	▲3.00
PAS hold		Swing		
Source(s) "Federal Government Gazette - Notice of Contested Election, State Legislative Assembly for the State of Penang [P.U. (B) 189/2013]" (PDF). Attorney General's Chambers of Malaysia. 26 April 2013. "Federal Government Gazette - Results of Contested Election and Statements of the Poll after the Official Addition of Votes, State Constituencies for the State of Penang [P.U. (B) 230/2013]" (PDF). Attorney General's Chambers of Malaysia. 22 May 2013. Archived from the original (PDF) on 22 March 2019.

Penang state by-election, 25 August 2009 The by-election was called due to the death of incumbent, Mohd Hamdan Abdul Rahman.
Party	Candidate	Votes	%	∆%
PAS	Mohd Salleh Man	9,618	65.50	▼0.90
BN	Rohaizat Othman	5,067	34.50	▲0.90
Total valid votes		14,685	100.00	
Total rejected ballots		83		
Unreturned ballots		1		
Turnout		14,769	72.79	▼9.81
Registered electors		20,290		
Majority		4,551	31.00	▼2.80
PAS hold		Swing		
Source(s) "Pilihan Raya Kecil N.11 Permatang Pasir". Election Commission of Malaysia.

Penang state election, 2008
Party	Candidate	Votes	%	∆%
PAS	Mohd Hamdan Abdul Rahman	11,004	66.40	▲14.20
BN	Ahmad Sahar Shuib	5,571	32.60	▼14.20
Total valid votes		16,575	100.00	
Total rejected ballots		227		
Unreturned ballots		1		
Turnout		16,803	82.60	▲0.60
Registered electors		20,350		
Majority		5,433	33.80	▲29.40
PAS hold		Swing		

Penang state election, 2004
Party	Candidate	Votes	%	∆%
PAS	Mohd Hamdan Abdul Rahman	8,057	52.20	▼9.49
BN	Adnan Ramli	7,378	47.80	▲9.49
Total valid votes		15,435	100.00	
Total rejected ballots		246		
Unreturned ballots		22		
Turnout		15,703	82.00	▲1.32
Registered electors		19,149		
Majority		679	4.40	▼18.98
PAS hold		Swing		

Penang state election, 1999
Party	Candidate	Votes	%	∆%
PAS	Mohd Hamdan Abdul Rahman	8,430	61.69	▲41.81
BN	Ahmad Saad	5,236	38.31	▼29.60
Total valid votes		13,666	100.00	
Total rejected ballots		274		
Unreturned ballots		0		
Turnout		13,940	80.68	▲2.05
Registered electors		17,279		
Majority		3,194	23.38	▼24.64
PAS gain from BN		Swing		?

Penang state election, 1995
Party	Candidate	Votes	%	∆%
BN	Ahmad Saad	8,764	67.90	▼2.63
PAS	Yusoff Abdul Latif	2,566	19.88	▼9.59
DAP	Mior Ariff Mior Hassan	1,577	12.22	▲12.22
Total valid votes		12,907	100.00	
Total rejected ballots		252		
Unreturned ballots		12		
Turnout		13,171	78.63	▼3.34
Registered electors		16,750		
Majority		6,198	48.02	▲6.96
BN hold		Swing		

Penang state election, 1990
Party	Candidate	Votes	%	∆%
BN	Adnan Ramli	7,338	70.53	▲3.77
PAS	Yusoff Abdul Latif	3,066	29.47	▼3.77
Total valid votes		10,404	100.00	
Total rejected ballots		297		
Unreturned ballots		0		
Turnout		10,701	81.97	▲4.34
Registered electors		13,054		
Majority		4,272	41.06	▲7.54
BN hold		Swing		

Penang state election, 1986
Party	Candidate	Votes	%
BN	Adnan Ramli	6,086	66.76
PAS	Ahmad Awang	3,030	33.24
Total valid votes		10,404	100.00
Total rejected ballots		257	
Unreturned ballots		0	
Turnout		9,373	77.63
Registered electors		12,074	
Majority		3,056	33.52
This was a new constituency created.

== See also ==
- Constituencies of Penang
