= Mohd Osman Mohd Jailu =

Malaysian politician

- محمد عثمان محمد جايلو

Member of the Perak State Legislative Assembly for Changkat Jering
- In office 2008–2013
- Preceded by: Mat Isa Ismail
- Succeeded by: Mohammad Nizar Jamaluddin

Personal details
- Born: Mohd Osman bin Mohd Jailu
- Citizenship: Malaysian
- Party: PKR (till 2009)
- Other political affiliations: Pakatan Rakyat (till 2009)
- Occupation: Politician

Mohd Osman bin Mohd Jailu is a Malaysian politician. He was the Member of Perak State Legislative Assembly for Changkat Jering from 2008 to 2013.

== Politics ==
Mohd Osman was active in PKR and agreed to the ideology of Anwar Ibrahim. His experience as a leader in the army got him a lot of support in Changkat Jering.

=== Independent state assemblyman ===
Jamaluddin Mohd Radzi, Hee Yit Foong and him has caused the Pakatan Rakyat government to be toppled by being independent politician in the 2009 Perak constitutional crisis. However, they did not join other party to keep themselves away from legal problems.

== Election results ==
Perak State Legislative Assembly
Year	Constituency	Candidate	Votes	Pct.	Opponent(s)	Votes	Pct.	Ballots cast	Majority	Turnout
2008	N14 Changkat Jering	Mohd Osman Mohd Jailu (PKR)	9,411	51.95%	Mat Isa Ismail (UMNO)	8,309	45.87%	18,114	1,102	72.85%
