= Sungai Rapat =

Political subdivision in Malaysia

Sungai Rapat (N44)
Perak constituency

State constituency
- Legislature: Perak State Legislative Assembly
MLA
Mohamad Nizar Jamaluddin
PH
- Constituency created: 2004
- First contested: 2004
- Last contested: 2022

Demographics
- Electors (2022): 47,931

Sungai Rapat is a state constituency in Perak, Malaysia, that has been represented in the Perak State Legislative Assembly.

== Demographics ==
Ethnic breakdown of Sungai Rapat's electorate as of 2022
1. Malay (61.0%)
2. Chinese (26.1%)
3. Indian (11.6%)
4. Other ethnicities (1.29%)

== History ==
=== Polling districts ===
According to the federal gazette issued on 31 October 2022, the Sungai Rapat constituency is divided into 9 polling districts.

State constituency	Polling Districts	Code	Location
Sungai Rapat（N44）	Ara Payong	071/44/01	SK St. Bernadette's Convent; SRA Rakyat Nurul Iman; Arena Square Batu Gajah
Sungai Rapat（N44）	Kampong Pisang	071/44/02	SK Sultan Yussuf
Sungai Rapat（N44）	Sri Jaya	071/44/03	SK Seri Jaya
Sungai Rapat（N44）	Sri Rahmat	071/44/04	SK Kg. Seri Rahmat
Sungai Rapat（N44）	Desa Pelancongan	071/44/05	SM Poi Lam (SUWA) Ipoh
Sungai Rapat（N44）	Desa Pakatan	071/44/06	SK Pengkalan; SMK Pengkalan
Sungai Rapat（N44）	Rapat Jaya	071/44/07	SK Rapat Jaya
Sungai Rapat（N44）	Sungai Rapat	071/44/08	SK Sungai Rapat; STAM Maahad Imtiyaz
Sungai Rapat（N44）	Sungai Rokam	071/44/09	SRA Rakyat Sungai Rokam

=== Representation history ===
Members of the Legislative Assembly for Sungai Rapat
Assembly	No	Years	Name	Party
Constituency created from Rapat Setia and Lahat
11th	N43	2004-2008	Hamidah Osman	BN (UMNO)
12th	N43	2008-2013	Hamidah Osman	BN (UMNO)
13th	N43	2013-2018	Radzi Zainon	PR (PAS)
14th	N44	2018-2022	Mohammad Nizar Jamaluddin	PH (AMANAH)
15th	N44	2022–present	Mohammad Nizar Jamaluddin	PH (AMANAH)

== Election results ==
Perak state election, 2022: Sungai Rapat
Party	Candidate	Votes	%	∆%
PH	Mohammad Nizar Jamaluddin	15,056	41.91	▲41.91
PN	Mahader Ayob	11,571	32.19	▲32.19
BN	Hang Tuah Din	9,152	25.46	▼8.61
Heritage	Roshanita Mohamad Basir	154	0.43	▲0.43
Total valid votes		35,942	100.00	
Total rejected ballots		542		
Unreturned ballots		13		
Turnout		36,497	76.14	▼6.51
Registered electors		47,931		
Majority		3,494	9.72	▼3.35
PH hold		Swing		

Perak state election, 2018: Sungai Rapat
Party	Candidate	Votes	%	∆%
PKR	Mohammad Nizar Jamaluddin	12,425	48.04	▲48.04
BN	Hamzah Mohd Kasim	8,811	34.07	▼11.79
PAS	Radzi Zainon	4,627	17.89	▼35.30
Total valid votes		25,863	98.17	
Total rejected ballots		284	1.08	
Unreturned ballots		199	0.76	
Turnout		26,346	82.65	▼3.05
Registered electors		31,878		
Majority		3,614	13.07	▲6.67
PKR gain from PAS		Swing		?
Source(s) "RESULTS OF CONTESTED ELECTION AND STATEMENTS OF THE POLL AFTER THE OFFICIAL ADDITION OF VOTES".

Perak state election, 2013: Sungai Rapat
Party	Candidate	Votes	%	∆%
PAS	Radzi Zainon	19,240	53.19	▲4.60
BN	Hamidah Osman	16,602	45.89	▼5.65
Independent	Mior Azman Aminuddin Mior Aris	333	0.92	▲0.91
Total valid votes		36,175	98.46	
Total rejected ballots		460	1.25	
Unreturned ballots		106	0.29	
Turnout		36,741	85.70	▲12.72
Registered electors		42,873		
Majority		2,638	7.30	▲4.35
PAS gain from BN		Swing		?
Source(s) "KEPUTUSAN PILIHAN RAYA UMUM DEWAN UNDANGAN NEGERI".

Perak state election, 2008: Sungai Rapat
Party	Candidate	Votes	%	∆%
BN	Hamidah Osman	10,635	51.54	▼14.36
PAS	Radzi Zainon	9,999	48.59	▲14.36
Total valid votes		20,634	98.07	
Total rejected ballots		406	1.93	
Unreturned ballots		0	0.00	
Turnout		21,040	72.98	▲1.16
Registered electors		28,830		
Majority		636	2.95	▼31.82
BN hold		Swing		
Source(s) "KEPUTUSAN PILIHAN RAYA UMUM DEWAN UNDANGAN NEGERI PERAK BAGI TAHUN 2008".

Perak state election, 2004: Sungai Rapat
Party	Candidate	Votes	%
BN	Hamidah Osman	11,881	65.90
PAS	Roslan Shaharum	5,612	31.13
Independent	Balakrishnan Rengasamy	536	2.97
Total valid votes		18,029	97.44
Total rejected ballots		301	1.63
Unreturned ballots		172	0.93
Turnout		18,502	71.82
Registered electors		25,762	
Majority		6,269	34.77
This was a new constituency created.
Source(s) "KEPUTUSAN PILIHAN RAYA UMUM DEWAN UNDANGAN NEGERI PERAK BAGI TAHUN 2004".
