= Idris Ahmad (Perak politician) =

Malaysian politician

Yang Berhormat Datuk Idris Ahmad PMW MP
- إدريس أحمد
- Idris in 2026

Minister in the Prime Minister's Department (Religious Affairs)
- In office 30 August 2021 – 24 November 2022
- Monarch: Abdullah
- Prime Minister: Ismail Sabri Yaakob
- Deputy: Ahmad Marzuk Shaary
- Preceded by: Zulkifli Mohamad Al-Bakri
- Succeeded by: Mohd Na'im Mokhtar
- Constituency: Senator

Senator Appointed by the Yang di-Pertuan Agong
- In office 16 June 2020 – 5 November 2022
- Monarch: Abdullah
- Prime Minister: Muhyiddin Yassin (2020–2021); Ismail Sabri Yaakob (2021–2022)

Member of the Malaysian Parliament for Bagan Serai
- Incumbent
- Assumed office 19 November 2022
- Preceded by: Noor Azmi Ghazali (BN–UMNO)
- Majority: 18,551 (2022)

Member of the Malaysian Parliament for Bukit Gantang
- In office 5 May 2013 – 9 May 2018
- Preceded by: Mohamad Nizar Jamaluddin (PR–PAS)
- Succeeded by: Syed Abu Hussin Hafiz (BN–UMNO)
- Majority: 986 (2013)

Vice President of the Malaysian Islamic Party
- Incumbent
- Assumed office 4 June 2015 Serving with Mohd Amar Abdullah & Iskandar Abdul Samad (2015–2019) & Ahmad Samsuri Mokhtar (since 2019)
- President: Abdul Hadi Awang
- Preceded by: Salahuddin Ayub

Faction represented in Dewan Rakyat
- 2013–2018: Malaysian Islamic Party
- 2022–: Perikatan Nasional

Faction represented in Dewan Negara
- 2020: Malaysian Islamic Party
- 2020–2022: Perikatan Nasional

Personal details
- Born: Idris bin Ahmad; 19 October 1963 (age 63) Changkat Jering, Taiping, Perak, Malaysia
- Citizenship: Malaysia
- Party: Malaysian Islamic Party (PAS)
- Other political affiliations: Barisan Alternatif (BA) (1999–2004); Pakatan Rakyat (PR) (2008–2015); Gagasan Sejahtera (GS) (2016–2020); Perikatan Nasional (PN) (since 2020)
- Spouse: Kamariah Mat Ali
- Relations: Hassan Ahmad (Elder brother)
- Education: Sultan Alam Shah Islamic College; National University of Malaysia
- Occupation: Politician
- Profession: Lecturer

Idris bin Ahmad (Jawi: إدريس بن أحمد; born 19 October 1963) is a Malaysian politician who has served as the Member of Parliament (MP) for Bagan Serai since November 2022. He served as the Minister in the Prime Minister's Department in charge of Religious Affairs in the Barisan Nasional (BN) administration under former Prime Minister Ismail Sabri Yaakob from August 2021 to the collapse of the BN administration in November 2022, Senator from June 2020 to his resignation in November 2022 and the MP for Bukit Gantang from May 2013 to May 2018. He is a member and one of the Vice Presidents of the Malaysian Islamic Party (PAS), a component party of the Perikatan Nasional (PN) and formerly Gagasan Sejahtera (GS), Pakatan Rakyat (PR) and Barisan Alternatif (BA) coalitions.

== Election results ==
Parliament of Malaysia
Year	Constituency	Candidate	Votes	Pct	Opponent(s)	Votes	Pct	Ballots cast	Majority	Turnout
2004	P005 Jerlun	Idris Ahmad (PAS)	16,981	47.03%	Abdul Rahman Ariffin (UMNO)	19,123	52.97%	36,822	2,142	83.41%
2008	P005 Jerlun	Idris Ahmad (PAS)	17,219	46.99%	Mukhriz Mahathir (UMNO)	19,424	53.01%	37,242	2,205	81.95%
2013	P059 Bukit Gantang	Idris Ahmad (PAS)	30,563	50.82%	Ismail Saffian (UMNO)	29,577	49.18%	61,018	986	85.63%
2018	P059 Bukit Gantang	Idris Ahmad (PAS)	16,052	28.23%	Syed Abu Hussin Hafiz Syed Abdul Fasal (UMNO)	22,450	39.48%	57,867	4,089	82.82%
2018	P059 Bukit Gantang	Idris Ahmad (PAS)	16,052	28.23%	Khadri Khalid (BERSATU)	18,361	32.29%	57,867	4,089	82.82%
2022	P058 Bagan Serai	Idris Ahmad (PAS)	33,753	53.98%	Zul Helmi Ghazali (UMNO)	15,202	24.31%	62,533	18,551	77.88%
2022	P058 Bagan Serai	Idris Ahmad (PAS)	33,753	53.98%	Siti Aishah Shaik Ismail (PKR)	13,195	21.10%	62,533	18,551	77.88%
2022	P058 Bagan Serai	Idris Ahmad (PAS)	33,753	53.98%	Ahmad Luqman Ahmad Yahya (PEJUANG)	383	0.61%	62,533	18,551	77.88%

== Honours ==
=== Honours of Malaysia ===
- Malaysia
  - Recipient of the 17th Yang di-Pertuan Agong Installation Medal
- Federal Territory (Malaysia)
  - Commander of the Order of the Territorial Crown (PMW) – Datuk (2022)

== See also ==
- Members of the Dewan Negara, 14th Malaysian Parliament
- List of people who have served in both Houses of the Malaysian Parliament
