= Pasir Panjang (state constituency) =

Political subdivision in Malaysia

Pasir Panjang (N51)
Perak constituency

State constituency
- Legislature: Perak State Legislative Assembly
MLA
Rosli Abdul Rahman
PN
- Constituency created: 1994
- First contested: 1995
- Last contested: 2022

Demographics
- Electors (2022): 62,418
- Area (km²): 221

Pasir Panjang is a state constituency in Perak, Malaysia, that has been represented in the Perak State Legislative Assembly.

The state constituency was first contested in 1995 and is mandated to return a single Assemblyman to the Perak State Legislative Assembly under the first-past-the-post voting system.

== Definition ==
The Pasir Panjang constituency spans largest portion of southern part of Manjung district including township of Seri Manjung and industrial area of Lumut Port. It contains the polling districts of Kampong Telok, Kampong Baharu, Sungai Wangi, Ladang Sungai Wangi, Kampong Sitiawan, Samudera, Pundut, Bandar Baru Seri Manjung, Seri Manjung, Kampong Dato Sri Kamarudin, Pasir Panjang, Batu 8 Lekir, FELCRA Lekir, Lekir, Lekir Tengah, Sungai Tiram Lekir and Kayan.

== Demographics ==
Ethnic breakdown of Pasir Panjang's electorate as of 2018
1. Malay (75.1%)
2. Indian (14.0%)
3. Chinese (9.06%)
4. Other ethnicities (1.84%)

Total electors by polling district in 2016
Polling district	Electors
Kampong Telok	650
Kampong Baharu	1,314
Sungai Wangi	2,072
Ladang Sungai Wangi	1,729
Kampong Sitiawan	4,577
Samudera	4.454
Pundut	1,687
Bandar Baru Seri Manjung	3,404
Seri Manjung	4,854
Kampong Dato Sri Kamarudin	1,844
Pasir Panjang	1,841
Batu 8 Lekir	1,773
FELCRA Lekir	715
Lekir	2,074
Lekir Tengah	1,193
Sungai Tiram Lekir	816
Kayan	891
Total	35,888
Source: Malaysian Election Commission

== History ==
=== Polling districts ===
According to the federal gazette issued on 31 October 2022, the Pasir Panjang constituency is divided into 17 polling districts.

State constituency	Polling District	Code	Location
Pasir Panjang（N51）	Kampong Telok	074/51/01	SK Telaga Nanas
Pasir Panjang（N51）	Kampong Bahru	074/51/02	SK Kampong Bahru
Pasir Panjang（N51）	Sungai Wangi	074/51/03	SK Sungai Wangi
Pasir Panjang（N51）	Ladang Sungai Wangi	074/51/04	SJK (T) Ladang Sg. Wangi II
Pasir Panjang（N51）	Kampong Sitiawan	074/51/05	SK Sitiawan; SMK Ahmad Boestamam
Pasir Panjang（N51）	Samudera	074/51/06	SMK Seri Samudera; SJK (C) Eng Ling; SK Seri Sitiawan; SK Seri Samudera
Pasir Panjang（N51）	Pundut	074/51/07	SK Seri Bayu
Pasir Panjang（N51）	Bandar Baru Seri Manjung	074/51/08	SK Seri Manjung
Pasir Panjang（N51）	Seri Manjung	074/51/09	SMK Seri Manjung; Kolej Vokasional Seri Manjung
Pasir Panjang（N51）	Kampong Dato Sri Kamarudin	074/51/10	SK Kpg Dato' Seri Kamaruddin
Pasir Panjang（N51）	Pasir Panjang	074/51/11	SK Muhammad Saman
Pasir Panjang（N51）	Batu 8 Lekir	074/51/12	SK Lekir
Pasir Panjang（N51）	FELCRA Lekir	074/51/13	SK Gugusan Lekir
Pasir Panjang（N51）	Lekir	074/51/14	SK Batu Sepuluh
Pasir Panjang（N51）	Lekir Tengah	074/51/15	Dewan Seberguna Batu 15, Lekir
Pasir Panjang（N51）	Sungai Tiram Lekir	074/51/16	SK Sungai Tiram
Pasir Panjang（N51）	Kayan	074/51/17	SK Kayan

=== Representation history ===
Perak State Legislative Assemblyman for Pasir Panjang
Assembly	No	Years	Member	Party
Constituency created from Pangkor and Sitiawan
9th	N45	1995 – 1999	M. Muthiah	BN (MIC)
10th	N45	1999 – 2004	K. Munisamy	BN (MIC)
11th	N51	2004 – 2008	M. Ramachandran	BN (MIC)
12th	N51	2008 – 2013	Mohammad Nizar Jamaluddin	PR (PAS)
13th	N51	2013 – 2018	Rashidi Ibrahim	BN (UMNO)
14th	N51	2018 – 2022	Yahaya Mat Nor	PH (AMANAH)
15th	N51	2022 – present	Rosli Abdul Rahman	PN (PAS)

== Election results ==
Perak state election, 2022
Party	Candidate	Votes	%	∆%
PN	Rosli Abd Rahman	20,182	41.05	▲41.05
PH	Yahaya Mat Nor	15,065	30.64	▲30.64
BN	Mohd Rafiq Mohd	13,301	27.06	▼10.00
PEJUANG	Mohd Norazlee Mohd	339	0.69	▲0.69
Heritage	Nur Inderasyawalis Ahmad Mukhtar	274	0.56	▲0.56
Total valid votes		49,161	100.00	
Total rejected ballots		427		
Unreturned ballots		363		
Turnout		49,951	80.03	▼3.61
Registered electors		62,418		
Majority		5,117	10.41	▲6.91
PN gain from PKR		Swing		?

Perak state election, 2018
Party	Candidate	Votes	%	∆%
PKR	Yahaya Mat Nor	14,123	40.56	▲40.56
BN	Rashidi Ibrahim	12,904	37.06	▼13.04
PAS	Rohawati Abidin	7,795	22.39	▼26.70
Total valid votes		34,822	98.11	
Total rejected ballots		470	1.32	
Unreturned ballots		202	0.57	
Turnout		35,494	83.71	▼1.99
Registered electors		42,402		
Majority		1,219	3.50	▼2.49
PKR gain from BN		Swing		?
Source(s) "Federal Government Gazette" (PDF). Archived from the original (PDF) on 29 August 2019.

Perak state election, 2013
Party	Candidate	Votes	%	∆%
BN	Rashidi Ibrahim	15,153	50.10	▲11.56
PAS	Rohawati Abidin	14,849	49.09	▼12.37
Independent	Vijayan Subramaniam	245	0.81	▲0.81
Total valid votes		30,247	98.26	
Total rejected ballots		465	1.51	
Unreturned ballots		71	0.23	
Turnout		30,783	85.70	▲9.68
Registered electors		35,940		
Majority		304	1.01	▼21.91
BN gain from PAS		Swing		?
Source(s) "KEPUTUSAN PILIHAN RAYA UMUM DEWAN UNDANGAN NEGERI". Archived from the original on 2022-05-23.

Perak state election, 2008
Party	Candidate	Votes	%	∆%
PAS	Mohammad Nizar Jamaluddin	11,994	61.46	▲16.23
BN	Vasan P. Sinnadurai	7,520	38.54	▼38.54
Total valid votes		19,514	96.66	
Total rejected ballots		450	2.23	
Unreturned ballots		0	0.00	
Turnout		20,188	76.02	▼2.89
Registered electors		26,557		
Majority		4,474	22.92	▲13.38
PAS gain from BN		Swing		?
Source(s) "KEPUTUSAN PILIHAN RAYA UMUM DEWAN UNDANGAN NEGERI PERAK BAGI TAHUN 2008".

Perak state election, 2004
Party	Candidate	Votes	%	∆%
BN	M. Ramachandran	9,446	54.77	▲2.91
PAS	Norazli Musa	7,802	45.23	▼2.91
Total valid votes		17,248	95.93	
Total rejected ballots		474	2.64	
Unreturned ballots		258	1.43	
Turnout		17,980	73.13	▼5.12
Registered electors		24,587		
Majority		1,644	9.54	▲5.82
BN hold		Swing		
Source(s) "KEPUTUSAN PILIHAN RAYA UMUM DEWAN UNDANGAN NEGERI PERAK BAGI TAHUN 2004".

Perak state election, 1999
Party	Candidate	Votes	%	∆%
BN	K. Munisamy	7,470	51.86	▼23.93
PAS	Sidek Noor	6,935	48.14	▲23.29
Total valid votes		14,405	95.25	
Total rejected ballots		405	2.68	
Unreturned ballots		313	2.07	
Turnout		15,123	68.01	▼2.70
Registered electors		22,238		
Majority		535	3.72	▼47.86
BN hold		Swing		
Source(s) "KEPUTUSAN PILIHAN RAYA UMUM DEWAN UNDANGAN NEGERI PERAK BAGI TAHUN 1999".

Perak state election, 1995
Party	Candidate	Votes	%
BN	M. Muthiah	9,740	75.79
S46	Zulkifli Mat Isin	3,112	24.21
Total valid votes		12,852	93.61
Total rejected ballots		547	3.98
Unreturned ballots		330	2.40
Turnout		13,729	65.31
Registered electors		21,021	
Majority		6,628	51.58
This was a new constituency created.
Source(s) "KEPUTUSAN PILIHAN RAYA UMUM DEWAN UNDANGAN NEGERI PERAK BAGI TAHUN 1995".

== See also ==
- Perak State Legislative Assembly
