= Mohd Kamaruddin Abu Bakar =

Malaysian politician

Mohd Kamaruddin Abu Bakar AMP
- محمد كامروددين ابو بكر

Member of the Perak State Legislative Assembly for Kuala Sepetang
- In office 2018 – 19 November 2022
- Preceded by: Chua Yee Ling

Personal details
- Born: Mohd Kamaruddin bin Abu Bakar
- Citizenship: Malaysian
- Party: UMNO
- Other political affiliations: Barisan Nasional
- Occupation: Politician

Mohd Kamaruddin bin Abu Bakar is a Malaysian politician from UMNO. He was the Member of Perak State Legislative Assembly for Kuala Sepetang from 2018 to 2022. He is the current chief of UMNO Bukit Gantang branch.

== Election results ==
Perak State Legislative Assembly
Year	Constituency	Candidate	Votes	Pct.	Opponent(s)	Votes	Pct.	Ballots cast	Majority	Turnout
2018	N13 Kuala Sepetang	Mohd Kamaruddin Abu Bakar (UMNO)	8,993	36.91%	Chua Yee Ling (PKR)	8,664	35.56%	24,363	329	83.17%
2018	N13 Kuala Sepetang	Mohd Kamaruddin Abu Bakar (UMNO)	8,993	36.91%	Rahim Ismail (PAS)	6,296	25.84%	24,363	329	83.17%

== Honours ==
- Perak
  - Member of the Order of the Perak State Crown (AMP) (2015)

== See also ==
- Pencinta Setia F.C.
