= Ahmad Saidi Mohamad Daud =

Malaysian politician

- أحمد سعيدي بن محمد داود

Exco roles (Perak)
- 2020: Chairman of the Health, Science, Environment and Green Technology
- 2020–2022: Chairman of the Education, Higher Education and Human Resources

Faction represented in Perak State Legislative Assembly
- 2018–2022: Barisan Nasional

Personal details
- Born: Perak, Malaysia
- Citizenship: Malaysian
- Party: United Malays National Organisation (UMNO)
- Other political affiliations: Barisan Nasional (BN); Perikatan Nasional (PN); Muafakat Nasional (MN)
- Education: UiTM
- Occupation: Politician

Ahmad Saidi bin Mohamad Daud is a Malaysian politician. He was formerly the Member of Perak State Legislative Assembly for Changkat Jering and served as a Perak State Executive Councillor.

== Election results ==
Perak State Legislative Assembly
Year	Constituency	Candidate	Votes	Pct	Opponent(s)	Votes	Pct	Ballots cast	Majority	Turnout
2018	N14 Changkat Jering	Ahmad Saidi Mohamad Daud (UMNO)	8,818	40.13%	Megat Shariffudin Ibrahim (AMANAH)	6,896	31.39%	22,329	1,922	83.20%
2018	N14 Changkat Jering	Ahmad Saidi Mohamad Daud (UMNO)	8,818	40.13%	Mohammad Nordin Jaafar (PAS)	6,199	28.21%	22,329	1,922	83.20%
2018	N14 Changkat Jering	Ahmad Saidi Mohamad Daud (UMNO)	8,818	40.13%	Mohganan Manikam (IND)	60	0.27%	22,329	1,922	83.20%
2022	N14 Changkat Jering	Ahmad Saidi Mohamad Daud (UMNO)	8,639	30.69%	Rahim Ismail (PAS)	11,790	41.89%	29,060	3,151	77.30%
2022	N14 Changkat Jering	Ahmad Saidi Mohamad Daud (UMNO)	8,639	30.69%	Megat Shariffudin Ismail (AMANAH)	7,511	26.68%	29,060	3,151	77.30%
2022	N14 Changkat Jering	Ahmad Saidi Mohamad Daud (UMNO)	8,639	30.69%	Nazar Talib (PEJUANG)	208	0.74%	29,060	3,151	77.30%
