= Fisheries Development Authority of Malaysia =

Malaysian government agency

- Lembaga Kemajuan Ikan Malaysia مجلس تنمية مصايد الأسماك الماليزي

Agency overview
- Formed: 1 November 1971; 54 years ago
- Jurisdiction: Government of Malaysia
- Headquarters: Wisma LKIM, Jalan Desaria, Pulau Meranti, 47120, Puchong, Selangor
- Minister responsible: Datuk Seri Mohamad Sabu, Minister of Agriculture and Food Security
- Deputy Minister responsible: Datuk Arthur Joseph Kurup, Deputy Minister of Agriculture and Food Security
- Agency executives: Muhammad Faiz Fadzil, Chairman; Jamaludin Othman, Chief Director
- Parent agency: Ministry of Agriculture and Food Industries
- Key document: Fisheries Development Authority of Malaysia Act 1971
- Website: www.lkim.gov.my

The Fisheries Development Authority of Malaysia (Malay: Lembaga Kemajuan Ikan Malaysia; Jawi: مجلس تنمية مصايد الأسماك الماليزي; officially abbreviated as LKIM) is a Malaysian government agency and a statutory body under Ministry of Agriculture and Food Industries. Established in 1971, it is responsible to improve social and economic status of fishermen and improve fishing industry in Malaysia while maintaining adequate supply of fish and seafood in the country.

== History ==
LKIM is established on 1 November 1971 under the Fisheries Development Authority of Malaysia Act 1971 (Act 49) to oversaws issues related to the Malaysian fisheries industry and supports its development. This act is enforced in Malaysia Peninsula on 1 November 1971, in Sarawak on 1 July 1973 and in Sabah on 1 August 1995.

In 1976, it set up its business arm, Majuikan, which focused on business and commercial fisheries activities.

LKIM began to conduct a census of 20,000 fishermen nationwide in May 1994, ensuring that no more fishing families are below the poverty line.

On 1 November 2021, LKIM celebrates its 50th anniversary.

In 2022, LKIM launched MyIsytihar app to enable all fishermens to made their own declarations using smartphones without being bound by the operating hours of the authority's Fish Declaration and Landing Center.

== Act and functions ==
LKIM's functions are clearly defined by the Fisheries Development Authority of Malaysia Act 1971. As prescribed in the Section 4(1) of the Act 49, among of its functions include:

- Promotes and develops an efficient and effective management of fisheries enterprises and marketing
- Arranges and supervises credit facilities for fish production and ensuring the fisheries facilities are fully utilized
- Participate in fishing enterprises and the construction of boats as well as the production of fishing supplies and equipment
- Encourages, stimulates, facilitates and work for the economic and social advancement of Fishermen's Associations
- Registers, controls and supervises Fishermen's Associations and provide for matters connected therewith
