= Bagan Serai (federal constituency) =

Malaysian federal constituency

Bagan Serai (P058)
Perak constituency

Federal constituency
- Legislature: Dewan Rakyat
- MP: Idris Ahmad; PN
- Constituency created: 1974
- First contested: 1974
- Last contested: 2022

Demographics
- Population (2020): 92,986
- Electors (2022): 80,293
- Area (km²): 770
- Pop. density (per km²): 120.8

Bagan Serai is a federal constituency in Kerian District, Perak, Malaysia, that has been represented in the Dewan Rakyat since 1974.

The federal constituency was created in the 1974 redistribution and is mandated to return a single member to the Dewan Rakyat under the first past the post voting system.

== Demographics ==
Ethnic breakdown of Bagan Serai's electorate as of 2022
1. Malay (78.6%)
2. Chinese (12.4%)
3. Indian (8.90%)
4. Other ethnicities (0.10%)

As of 2020, Bagan Serai has a population of 92,986 people.

Age breakdown of Bagan Serai's electorate as of 2022
1. 18–20 (6.29%)
2. 21–29 (21.3%)
3. 30–39 (21.9%)
4. 40–49 (17.7%)
5. 50–59 (15.1%)
6. 60–69 (10.1%)
7. 70–79 (5.48%)
8. 80–89 (1.76%)
9. above 90 (0.40%)
Gender breakdown of Bagan Serai's electorate as of 2022
1. Male (49.7%)
2. Female (50.3%)

== History ==
=== Polling districts ===
According to the federal gazette issued on 31 October 2022, the Bagan Serai constituency is divided into 45 polling districts.

State constituency	Polling Districts	Code	Location
Alor Pongsu (N10）	Simpang Lima	058/10/01	SJK (T) Simpang Lima
Alor Pongsu (N10）	Ladang Tali Ayer	058/10/02	SK Tanah Kebun
Alor Pongsu (N10）	Jalan Baharu	058/10/03	SK Jalan Baharu
Alor Pongsu (N10）	Parit Haji Amin	058/10/04	SK Jalan Baharu
Alor Pongsu (N10）	Kedai Dua	058/10/05	SRA Rakyat Al-Amaniah
Alor Pongsu (N10）	Pandak Puteh	058/10/06	SMK Sri Kurau
Alor Pongsu (N10）	Ladang Chersonese	058/10/07	SJK (T) Ladang Chersonese
Alor Pongsu (N10）	Ladang Gula	058/10/08	SJK (T) Ladang Gula
Alor Pongsu (N10）	Sungai Dungun	058/10/09	Dewan Serbaguna Bagan Serai, Taman Serai Permai
Alor Pongsu (N10）	Ladang Lian Seng	058/10/10	SK Matang Gerdu
Alor Pongsu (N10）	Jin Seng	058/10/11	SMK Sri Kurau
Alor Pongsu (N10）	Matang Gerdu	058/10/12	SK Matang Gerdu
Alor Pongsu (N10）	Sungai Bogak	058/10/13	SK Sungai Bogak
Alor Pongsu (N10）	Matang Jelutong	058/10/14	SK Matang Jelutong
Alor Pongsu (N10）	Parit Simpang Lima	058/10/15	SK Alor Pongsu
Alor Pongsu (N10）	Alor Pongsu	058/11/16	SK Alor Pongsu
Alor Pongsu (N10）	Changkat Lobak	058/11/17	SK Changkat Lobak
Gunong Semanggol (N11）	Batu 6 Bukit Merah	058/11/01	SRA Rakyat Al-Ammar
Gunong Semanggol (N11）	Bukit Merah	058/11/02	SK Bukit Merah
Gunong Semanggol (N11）	Pondok Tanjong Barat	058/11/03	SK Pondok Tanjong
Gunong Semanggol (N11）	Kampong Selamat	058/11/04	SK Kampong Selamat
Gunong Semanggol (N11）	Gunong Semanggol	058/11/05	SK Gunong Semanggol
Gunong Semanggol (N11）	Kubu Gajah	058/11/06	SRA Rakyat Nurul Islamiah
Gunong Semanggol (N11）	Kampong Tua	058/11/07	SK Haji Dahalan
Gunong Semanggol (N11）	Padang Lalang	058/11/08	SK Tebuk Pancur
Gunong Semanggol (N11）	Railway Line	058/11/09	SJK (C) Alor Pongsu
Gunong Semanggol (N11）	Parit Haji Taib	058/11/10	SK Parit Haji Taib
Gunong Semanggol (N11）	Mesjid Tinggi	058/11/11	SRA Rakyat Al Akhlak Al Islamiah
Gunong Semanggol (N11）	Kota Bandung	058/11/12	SK Dato' Mas'ud
Gunong Semanggol (N11）	Bagan Serai	058/11/13	SMK Bagan Serai
Gunong Semanggol (N11）	Main Road Bagan Serai	058/11/14	SJK (C) Tong Wah
Selinsing (N12）	Jalan Siakap	058/12/01	SMK Alang Iskandar
Selinsing (N12）	Kampong Kedah	058/12/02	SJK (T) Ladang Kalumpong
Selinsing (N12）	Kuala Gula	058/12/03	SK Kuala Gula
Selinsing (N12）	Selinsing	058/12/04	SK Seri Pinang
Selinsing (N12）	Parit Haji Tahir	058/12/05	SK Teluk Medan
Selinsing (N12）	Parit Gabis	058/12/06	SK Teluk Medan
Selinsing (N12）	Telok Medan	058/12/07	SMK Abu Bakar Al Baqir
Selinsing (N12）	Sungai Gedong	058/12/08	SJK (T) Ladang Gedong
Selinsing (N12）	Simpang Ampat Semanggol	058/12/09	SA Rakyat Azharul Jannah
Selinsing (N12）	Parit 3 Selinsing	058/12/10	SK Seri Pinang
Selinsing (N12）	Jalan Gula	058/12/11	SMK Mudazffar Shah
Selinsing (N12）	Kampong Dew	058/12/12	SMK Selinsing
Selinsing (N12）	Simpang Tiga	058/12/13	SK Dato' Alauddin
Selinsing (N12）	Bukit Putus	058/12/14	SR Islam Al-Ehya Asshariff

=== Representation history ===
Members of Parliament for Bagan Serai
Parliament	No	Years	Member	Party	Vote Share
Constituency created, renamed from Krian Darat
4th	P047	1974–1978	Ramli Omar (رملي عمر)	BN (UMNO)	Uncontested
5th	P047	1978–1982	Ramli Omar (رملي عمر)	BN (UMNO)	14,442; 59.24%
6th	P047	1982–1986	Zainal Abidin Zin (زاين العابدين زين)	BN (UMNO)	16,151; 62.46%
7th	P052	1986–1990	Zainal Abidin Zin (زاين العابدين زين)	BN (UMNO)	16,508; 63.36%
8th	P052	1990–1995	Qamaruzaman Ismail (قمرالزمان اسماعيل)	BN (UMNO)	14,824; 55.63%
9th	P055	1995–1999	Qamaruzaman Ismail (قمرالزمان اسماعيل)	BN (UMNO)	16,434; 61.74%
10th	P055	1999–2004	Zainal Abidin Zin (زاين العابدين زين)	BN (UMNO)	15,088; 52.77%
11th	P058	2004–2008	Zainal Abidin Zin (زاين العابدين زين)	BN (UMNO)	19,827; 58.25%
12th	P058	2008–2010	Mohsin Fadzli Samsuri (محسين فضلي سمسوري)	PR (PKR)	18,943; 54.95%
12th	P058	2010–2013	Mohsin Fadzli Samsuri (محسين فضلي سمسوري)	Independent	18,943; 54.95%
13th	P058	2013–2018	Noor Azmi Ghazali (نور عزمي غزالي)	BN (UMNO)	23,014; 50.90%
14th	P058	2018	Noor Azmi Ghazali (نور عزمي غزالي)	BN (UMNO)	17,220; 36.44%
14th	P058	2018	Noor Azmi Ghazali (نور عزمي غزالي)	Independent	17,220; 36.44%
14th	P058	2018–2020	Noor Azmi Ghazali (نور عزمي غزالي)	PH (BERSATU)	17,220; 36.44%
14th	P058	2020–2022	Noor Azmi Ghazali (نور عزمي غزالي)	PN (BERSATU)	17,220; 36.44%
15th	P058	2022–present	Idris Ahmad (إدريس احمد)	PN (PAS)	33,753; 53.98%

=== State constituency ===
Parliamentary constituency	State constituency						
Parliamentary constituency	1955–1959*	1959–1974	1974–1986	1986–1995	1995–2004	2004–2018	2018–present
Bagan Serai			Alor Pongsu				
Bagan Serai			Gunong Semanggol				
Bagan Serai						Selinsing	

=== Historical boundaries ===
State Constituency	Area				
State Constituency	1974	1984	1994	2003	2018
Alor Pongsu	Alor Pongsu; Bagan Serai; Bukit Merah; Kampung Liang Seng; Sungai Gedong	Alor Pongsu; Bagan Serai; Bukit Merah; Changkat Lobak; Simpang Lima		Alor Pongsu; Bagan Serai; Changkat Lobak; Kedai Dua; Simpang Lima	Alor Pongsu; Changkat Lobak; Kampung Liang Seng; Kedai Dua; Simpang Lima
Gunong Semanggol	Balik Bukit; Gunong Semanggol; Kuala Gula; Simpang Empat; Selinsing	Balik Bukit; Gunong Semanggol; Kuala Gula; Simpang Empat; Sungai Gedong		Balik Bukit; Bukit Merah; Gunong Semanggol; Kampung Kubu Gajah; Lembah Beriah	Bagan Serai; Bukit Merah; Gunong Semanggol; Kampung Kubu Gajah; Lembah Beriah
Selinsing				Kuala Gula; Lubok Buntar; Selinsing; Simpang Empat; Sungai Gedong	

=== Current state assembly members ===
No.	State Constituency	Member	Coalition (Party)
N10	Alor Pongsu	Noor Azman Ghazali	PN (BERSATU)
N11	Gunong Semanggol	Razman Zakaria	PN (PAS)
N12	Selinsing	Sallehuddin Abdullah	PN (PAS)

=== Local governments & postcodes ===
No.	State Constituency	Local Government	Postcode
N10	Alor Pongsu	Kerian District Council	34010 Taiping; 34200 Parit Buntar; 34300, 34310 Bagan Serai; 34350 Kuala Kurau; 34400 Simpang Ampat Semanggol
N11	Gunong Semanggol	Kerian District Council	34010 Taiping; 34200 Parit Buntar; 34300, 34310 Bagan Serai; 34350 Kuala Kurau; 34400 Simpang Ampat Semanggol
N12	Selinsing	Kerian District Council	34010 Taiping; 34200 Parit Buntar; 34300, 34310 Bagan Serai; 34350 Kuala Kurau; 34400 Simpang Ampat Semanggol

== Election results ==
Malaysian general election, 2022
Party	Candidate	Votes	%	∆%
PN	Idris Ahmad	33,753	53.98	▲53.98
BN	Zul Helmi Ghazali	15,202	24.31	▼12.13
PH	Siti Aishah Shaik Ismail	13,195	21.10	▲21.10
PEJUANG	Ahmad Luqman Ahmad Yahya	383	0.61	▲0.61
Total valid votes		62,533	100.00	
Total rejected ballots		895		
Unreturned ballots		93		
Turnout		63,521	77.88	▼3.72
Registered electors		80,293		
Majority		18,551	29.67	▲29.31
PN gain from BN		Swing		?
Source(s) https://lom.agc.gov.my/ilims/upload/portal/akta/outputp/1753277/PUB610%20PARLIMEN%20PERAK.pdf

Malaysian general election, 2018
Party	Candidate	Votes	%	∆%
BN	Noor Azmi Ghazali	17,220	36.44	▼14.46
PAS	Rohaya Bakar	17,048	36.08	▲36.08
PKR	Adam Asmuni	12,987	27.48	▼20.90
Total valid votes		47,255	100.00	
Total rejected ballots		865		
Unreturned ballots		261		
Turnout		48,381	81.60	▼3.06
Registered electors		59,293		
Majority		172	0.36	▲2.16
BN hold		Swing		
Source(s) "His Majesty's Government Gazette - Notice of Contested Election, Parliament for the State of Perak [P.U. (B) 237/2018]" (PDF). Attorney General's Chambers of Malaysia. 3 May 2018. "Federal Government Gazette - Results of Contested Election and Statements of the Poll after the Official Addition of Votes, Parliamentary Constituencies for the State of Perak [P.U. (B) 311/2018]" (PDF). Attorney General's Chambers of Malaysia. 28 May 2018.

Malaysian general election, 2013
Party	Candidate	Votes	%	∆%
BN	Noor Azmi Ghazali	23,014	50.90	▲5.85
PKR	Muhammad Nur Manuty	21,874	48.38	▼6.57
Independent	Abdul Latiff Mas'ud	329	0.73	▲0.73
Total valid votes		45,217	100.00	
Total rejected ballots		1,096		
Unreturned ballots		73		
Turnout		46,386	84.66	▲7.74
Registered electors		54,792		
Majority		1,140	2.52	▼7.38
BN gain from PKR		Swing		?
Source(s) "Federal Government Gazette - Notice of Contested Election, Parliament for the State of Perak [P.U. (B) 174/2013]" (PDF). Attorney General's Chambers of Malaysia. 26 April 2013. Archived from the original (PDF) on 29 December 2019. "Federal Government Gazette - Results of Contested Election and Statements of the Poll after the Official Addition of Votes, Parliamentary Constituencies for the State of Perak [P.U. (B) 215/2013]" (PDF). Attorney General's Chambers of Malaysia. 22 May 2013.

Malaysian general election, 2008
Party	Candidate	Votes	%	∆%
PKR	Mohsin Fadzli Samsuri	18,943	54.95	▲54.95
BN	Zainal Abidin Zin	15,530	45.05	▼13.20
Total valid votes		34,473	100.00	
Total rejected ballots		1,186		
Unreturned ballots		578		
Turnout		36,237	76.92	▲11.19
Registered electors		47,111		
Majority		3,413	9.90	▼6.60
PKR gain from BN		Swing		?

Malaysian general election, 2004
Party	Candidate	Votes	%	∆%
BN	Zainal Abidin Zin	19,827	58.25	▲5.48
PAS	Ahmad Awang	14,209	41.75	▼5.48
Total valid votes		34,036	100.00	
Total rejected ballots		986		
Unreturned ballots		54		
Turnout		35,076	73.47	▲7.74
Registered electors		47,741		
Majority		5,618	16.50	▲10.96
BN hold		Swing		

Malaysian general election, 1999
Party	Candidate	Votes	%	∆%
BN	Zainal Abidin Zin	15,088	52.77	▼9.74
PAS	Ahmad Awang	13,504	47.23	▲47.23
Total valid votes		28,592	100.00	
Total rejected ballots		835		
Unreturned ballots		80		
Turnout		29,507	65.73	▼1.82
Registered electors		44,891		
Majority		1,584	5.54	▼17.94
BN hold		Swing		

Malaysian general election, 1995
Party	Candidate	Votes	%	∆%
BN	Qamaruzaman Ismail	16,434	61.74	▲6.11
S46	Zainal Abidin Zin	10,184	38.26	▼6.11
Total valid votes		26,618	100.00	
Total rejected ballots		1,535		
Unreturned ballots		98		
Turnout		28,251	67.55	▼3.78
Registered electors		41,822		
Majority		6,250	23.48	▲12.22
BN hold		Swing		

Malaysian general election, 1990
Party	Candidate	Votes	%	∆%
BN	Qamaruzaman Ismail	14,824	55.63	▼7.73
S46	Zainal Abidin Zin	11,822	44.37	▲44.37
Total valid votes		26,646	100.00	
Total rejected ballots		1,053		
Unreturned ballots		0		
Turnout		27,699	71.33	▲2.84
Registered electors		38,834		
Majority		3,002	11.26	▼15.46
BN hold		Swing		

Malaysian general election, 1986
Party	Candidate	Votes	%	∆%
BN	Zainal Abidin Zin	16,508	63.36	▲0.90
PAS	Rahmat Husin	9,548	36.64	▼0.90
Total valid votes		26,056	100.00	
Total rejected ballots		880		
Unreturned ballots		0		
Turnout		26,936	68.49	▼5.83
Registered electors		39,328		
Majority		6,960	26.72	▲1.80
BN hold		Swing		

Malaysian general election, 1982
Party	Candidate	Votes	%	∆%
BN	Zainal Abidin Zin	16,151	62.46	▲3.22
PAS	Abdul Kadir Kahar	9,708	37.54	▲7.62
Total valid votes		25,859	100.00	
Total rejected ballots		1,148		
Unreturned ballots		0		
Turnout		27,007	74.32	▼0.58
Registered electors		36,338		
Majority		6,443	24.92	▼4.40
BN hold		Swing		

Malaysian general election, 1978
Party	Candidate	Votes	%	∆%
BN	Ramli Omar	14,442	59.24	▲59.24
PAS	Ibrahim Hassan	7,295	29.92	▲29.92
DAP	Abu Samah Yahaya	2,643	10.84	▲10.84
Total valid votes		24,380	100.00	
Total rejected ballots		982		
Unreturned ballots		0		
Turnout		25,462	74.90	
Registered electors		33,863		
Majority		7,147	29.32	
BN hold		Swing		

Malaysian general election, 1974
Party	Candidate	Votes	%	∆%
On the nomination day, Ramli Omar won uncontested.
BN	Ramli Omar			
Total valid votes			100.00	
Total rejected ballots				
Unreturned ballots				
Turnout				
Registered electors		29,919		
Majority				
This was a new constituency created.
