= Kuala Sepetang (state constituency) =

Political subdivision in Malaysia

Kuala Sepetang (N13)
Perak constituency

State constituency
- Legislature: Perak State Legislative Assembly
MLA
Ahmad Man
PN
- Constituency created: 1994
- First contested: 1995
- Last contested: 2022

Demographics
- Electors (2022): 40,222

Kuala Sepetang is a state constituency in Perak, Malaysia, that has been represented in the Perak State Legislative Assembly.

== Demographics ==
Ethnic breakdown of Kuala Sepetang's electorate as of 2022
1. Malay (67.8%)
2. Chinese (23.5%)
3. Indian (8.25%)
4. Other ethnicities (0.46%)

== History ==
=== Polling districts ===
According to the federal gazette issued on 31 October 2022, the Kuala Sepetang constituency is divided into 14 polling districts.

State constituency	Polling Districts	Code	Location
Kuala Sepetang (N13）	Kurina Jaya	059/13/01	SRA Rakyat Nurul Hidayah
Kuala Sepetang (N13）	Palma	059/13/02	SK Taman Palma; Madrasah Al-Zilahiyah
Kuala Sepetang (N13）	Ayer Puteh	059/13/03	SK Ayer Puteh
Kuala Sepetang (N13）	Jebong	059/13/04	SK Ngah Ibrahim
Kuala Sepetang (N13）	Kuala Sepetang	059/13/05	SJK (C) Poay Eng
Kuala Sepetang (N13）	Kampong Menteri	059/13/06	SK Laksamana
Kuala Sepetang (N13）	Jalan Mangala	059/13/07	SJK (C) Khea Wah
Kuala Sepetang (N13）	Simpang Halt	059/13/08	SJK (T) Kampung Jebong Lama
Kuala Sepetang (N13）	Sungai Mati	059/13/09	SMK Matang
Kuala Sepetang (N13）	Sungai Limau	059/13/10	SK Matang Gelugor
Kuala Sepetang (N13）	Matang Gelugor	059/13/11	SK Matang Gelugor
Kuala Sepetang (N13）	Kampong Jaha	059/13/12	Dewan J.K.K.K Kg. Jaha/Kg. Perak
Kuala Sepetang (N13）	Bendang Siam	059/13/13	SMK Dato' Wan Ahmad Rasdi
Kuala Sepetang (N13）	Changkat Ibol	059/13/14	SK Changkat Ibol

=== Representation history ===
Members of the Legislative Assembly for Kuala Sepetang
Assembly	No	Years	Name	Party
Constituency created from Sapetang
Kuala Sapetang
9th	N10	1995-1999	Siew Kok Kan (萧国根)	BN (GERAKAN)
10th	N10	1999-2004	Siew Kok Kan (萧国根)	BN (GERAKAN)
11th	N13	2004-2008	See Tean Seng (施天星)	BN (GERAKAN)
12th	N13	2008-2013	Tai Sing Ng (戴成银)	PR (PKR)
13th	N13	2013-2018	Chua Yee Ling (蔡依霖)	PR (PKR)
Kuala Sepetang
14th	N13	2018-2022	Mohd Kamaruddin Abu Bakar	BN (UMNO)
15th	N13	2022–present	Ahmad Man	PN (BERSATU)

== Election results ==
Perak state election, 2022
Party	Candidate	Votes	%	∆%
PN	Ahmad Man	12,582	41.34	▲41.34
PH	Zainal Azman Abu Seman	9,002	29.58	▲29.58
BN	Mohd Kamaruddin Abu Bakar	8,687	28.54	▼9.00
PEJUANG	Norhaliza'awayati Meman	166	0.55	▲0.55
Total valid votes		30,973	100.00	
Total rejected ballots		486		
Unreturned ballots		50		
Turnout		31,509	77.01	▼6.16
Registered electors		40,222		
Majority		3,580	11.76	▲10.39
PN gain from BN		Swing		?

Perak state election, 2018
Party	Candidate	Votes	%	∆%
BN	Mohd Kamaruddin Abu Bakar	8,993	37.54	▼9.66
PKR	Chua Yee Ling	8,664	36.17	▼14.60
PAS	Rahim Ismail	6,296	26.28	▲26.28
Total valid votes		23,953	98.32	
Total rejected ballots		334	1.37	
Unreturned ballots		76	0.31	
Turnout		24,363	83.17	▼3.13
Registered electors		29,294		
Majority		329	1.37	▼2.20
BN gain from PKR		Swing		?
Source(s) "RESULTS OF CONTESTED ELECTION AND STATEMENTS OF THE POLL AFTER THE OFFICIAL ADDITION OF VOTES".

Perak state election, 2013: Kuala Sapetang
Party	Candidate	Votes	%	∆%
PKR	Chua Yee Ling	10,775	50.77	▼1.24
BN	Loh Swee Eng	10,017	47.20	▼0.79
Pan-Malaysian Islamic Front	Zainal Abidin Abdul Rahman	430	2.03	▲2.03
Total valid votes		21,222	100	
Total rejected ballots		420		
Unreturned ballots		31		
Turnout		21,673	86.30	▲12.71
Registered electors		25,119		
Majority		758	3.57	▼0.45
PKR hold		Swing		
Source(s) "KEPUTUSAN PILIHAN RAYA UMUM DEWAN UNDANGAN NEGERI". Archived from the original on 2016-10-23.

Perak state election, 2008: Kuala Sapetang
Party	Candidate	Votes	%	∆%
PKR	Tai Sing Ng	7,285	52.01	▲21.98
BN	See Tean Seng	6,721	47.99	▼2.95
Total valid votes		14,006	96.62	
Total rejected ballots		460	3.17	
Unreturned ballots		30	0.21	
Turnout		14,496	73.59	▲1.05
Registered electors		19,699		
Majority		564	4.02	▲16.89
PKR gain from BN		Swing		?
Source(s) "KEPUTUSAN PILIHAN RAYA UMUM DEWAN UNDANGAN NEGERI PERAK BAGI TAHUN 2008".

Perak state election, 2004: Kuala Sapetang
Party	Candidate	Votes	%	∆%
BN	See Tean Seng	6,544	50.94	▼7.42
PKR	Abdul Latip Ariffin	3,858	30.03	▼11.61
DAP	Chuah Tiong San	2,443	19.02	▲19.02
Total valid votes		12,845	96.49	
Total rejected ballots		443	3.33	
Unreturned ballots		24	0.18	
Turnout		13,312	72.54	▲5.44
Registered electors		18,351		
Majority		2,686	20.91	▲4.19
BN hold		Swing		
Source(s) "KEPUTUSAN PILIHAN RAYA UMUM DEWAN UNDANGAN NEGERI PERAK BAGI TAHUN 2004".

Perak state election, 1999: Kuala Sapetang
Party	Candidate	Votes	%	∆%
BN	Siew Kok Kan	7,357	58.36	▼12.79
PKR	Mahi Din Sari	5,249	41.64	▲41.64
Total valid votes		12,606	96.70	
Total rejected ballots		415	3.18	
Unreturned ballots		15	0.12	
Turnout		13,036	67.10	▼1.98
Registered electors		19,428		
Majority		2,108	16.72	▼25.46
BN hold		Swing		
Source(s) "KEPUTUSAN PILIHAN RAYA UMUM DEWAN UNDANGAN NEGERI PERAK BAGI TAHUN 1999".

Perak state election, 1995: Kuala Sapetang
Party	Candidate	Votes	%
BN	Siew Kok Kan	8,930	71.09
S46	Abdul Malik Ahmad	3,631	28.91
Total valid votes		12,561	95.48
Total rejected ballots		579	4.40
Unreturned ballots		15	0.11
Turnout		13,155	69.08
Registered electors		19,043	
Majority		5,299	42.18
This was a new constituency created.
