= Yew Tian Hoe =

Malaysian politician

- 姚天和

Member of the Perak State Legislative Assembly for Aulong
- In office 8 March 2008 – 5 May 2013
- Preceded by: Yeong Sing Chee
- Succeeded by: Leow Thye Yih

Personal details
- Born: Yew Tian Hoe
- Citizenship: Malaysian
- Party: DAP
- Other political affiliations: Pakatan Rakyat
- Occupation: Politician

Yew Tian Hoe (Pe̍h-ōe-jī: Iâu Thian-hô) is a Malaysian politician from DAP. He was the Member of the Perak State Legislative Assembly for Aulong from 2008 to 2013.

== Politics ==
He was dropped as a candidate for the 2013 Malaysian general election in spite of being told by-then DAP Perak state chairman, Ngeh Koo Ham that he is going to defend his seat. However, he still participate in the election as an independent candidate.

== Election results ==
Perak State Legislative Assembly
Year	Constituency	Candidate	Votes	Pct	Opponent(s)	Votes	Pct	Ballots cast	Majority	Turnout
2004	N18 Aulong	Yew Tian Hoe (DAP)	5,011	31.42%	Ng Chi Fa (Gerakan)	9,016	56.53%	15,949	4,005	68.85%
2004	N18 Aulong	Yew Tian Hoe (DAP)	5,011	31.42%	Abdul Rahman Uda Mat Isa (PKR)	1,145	7.18%	15,949	4,005	68.85%
2008	N18 Aulong	Yew Tian Hoe (DAP)	9,360	57.05%	Ong Teng Boon (Gerakan)	6,552	39.94%	16,406	2,808	69.80%
2013	N18 Aulong	Yew Tian Hoe (IND)	225	0.98%	Leow Thye Yih (DAP)	14,843	65.73%	22,896	7,330	80.50%
2013	N18 Aulong	Yew Tian Hoe (IND)	225	0.98%	Soo Kay Ping (Gerakan)	7,513	33.35%	22,896	7,330	80.50%
