= Aulong (state constituency) =

Political subdivision in Malaysia

Aulong (N18)
Perak constituency

State constituency
- Legislature: Perak State Legislative Assembly
MLA
Teh Kok Lim
PH
- Constituency created: 1994
- First contested: 1995
- Last contested: 2022

Demographics
- Electors (2022): 45,203

Aulong is a state constituency in Perak, Malaysia, that has been represented in the Perak State Legislative Assembly.

== Demographics ==
Ethnic breakdown of Aulong's electorate as of 2022
1. Chinese (52.5%)
2. Malay (28.7%)
3. Indian (18.1%)
4. Other ethnicities (0.67%)

== History ==
=== Polling districts ===
According to the federal gazette issued on 31 October 2022, the Aulong constituency is divided into 16 polling districts.

State constituency	Polling Districts	Code	Location
Aulong（N18）	Batu Dua	060/18/01	SK Asam Kumbang
Aulong（N18）	Assam Kumbang	060/18/02	SRA Rakyat Madrasah Al-Tarbiah Al-Islamiah
Aulong（N18）	Barrack Road	060/18/03	SK King Edward VII (1)
Aulong（N18）	Station	060/18/04	SJK (C) Hua Lian (1)
Aulong（N18）	Aulong	060/18/05	SK Taman Panglima
Aulong（N18）	Aulong Timor	060/18/06	SJK (C) Aulong
Aulong（N18）	Aulong Tengah	060/18/07	Arena Sukan Kampung Baru Aulong
Aulong（N18）	Aulong Barat	060/18/08	SJK (C) Aulong
Aulong（N18）	Aulong Selatan	060/18/09	SRA Rakyat Nurul Islam; SK Convent Aulong
Aulong（N18）	Aulong Lama	060/18/10	SK Kampung Boyan
Aulong（N18）	Kampong Boyan	060/18/11	SRA Rakyat Al-Khairiah Al-Taufiqiah; Dewan Serbaguna Kampong Boyan
Aulong（N18）	Taman Sening	060/18/12	SMK Doktor Burhanuddin
Aulong（N18）	Taman Marisa	060/18/13	SMK Sri Kota
Aulong（N18）	Kota Lama	060/18/14	SMK Sri Kota
Aulong（N18）	Pengkalan Aor	060/18/15	SK Simpang; SRA Rakyat Al-Hidayah
Aulong（N18）	Simpang Baru	060/18/16	SJK (C) Sin Min

=== Representation history ===
Perak State Legislative Assemblyman for Aulong
Assembly	No	Years	Member	Party
Constituency created from Asam Kumbang, Kamunting and Sapetang
9th	N15	1995 – 1999	Yap Peng Lan (叶炳连)	BN (MCA)
10th	N15	1999 – 2004	Yeong Sing Chee (杨城志)	BN (MCA)
11th	N18	2004 – 2008	Ng Chii Fa (吴祁杰)	BN (GERAKAN)
12th	N18	2008 – 2013	Yew Tian Hoe (姚天和)	PR (DAP)
13th	N18	2013 – 2018	Leow Thye Yih (廖泰義)	PR (DAP)
14th	N18	2018 – 2022	Nga Kor Ming (倪可敏)	PH (DAP)
15th	N18	2022 – present	Teh Kok Lim (郑国霖)	PH (DAP)

== Election results ==
Perak state election, 2022
Party	Candidate	Votes	%	∆%
PH	Teh Kok Lim	20,306	66.22	▲66.22
PN	Koay Boon Hui	5,449	17.77	▲17.77
BN	G Shanmugiavalloo	3,756	12.25	▼12.81
Independent	Lee Seng Yap	739	2.41	▲2.41
Independent	Abu Bakar Abdul Rahman	415	1.35	▲1.35
Total valid votes		31,015	100.00	
Total rejected ballots		264		
Unreturned ballots		86		
Turnout		31,365	68.61	▼18.73
Registered electors		45,203		
Majority		14,857	48.45	▼1.43
PH hold		Swing		

Perak state election, 2018
Party	Candidate	Votes	%	∆%
PKR	Nga Kor Ming	18,123	74.94	▲74.94
BN	Soo Kay Ping	6,059	25.06	▼8.21
Total valid votes		24,182	97.08	
Total rejected ballots		583	2.34	
Unreturned ballots		145	0.58	
Turnout		24,910	77.53	▼2.97
Registered electors		32,129		
Majority		12,064	49.88	▲17.42
PKR hold		Swing		
Source(s) "RESULTS OF CONTESTED ELECTION AND STATEMENTS OF THE POLL AFTER THE OFFICIAL ADDITION OF VOTES".

Perak state election, 2013
Party	Candidate	Votes	%	∆%
DAP	Leow Thye Yih	14,843	65.73	▲6.91
BN	Soo Kay Ping	7,513	33.27	▼7.91
Independent	Yew Tian Hoe	225	1.00	▲1.00
Total valid votes		22,581	98.62	
Total rejected ballots		254	1.11	
Unreturned ballots		61	0.26	
Turnout		22,896	80.50	▲10.70
Registered electors		22,896		
Majority		7,330	32.46	▲14.82
DAP hold		Swing		
Source(s) "KEPUTUSAN PILIHAN RAYA UMUM DEWAN UNDANGAN NEGERI". Archived from the original on 2017-05-01.

Perak state election, 2008
Party	Candidate	Votes	%	∆%
DAP	Yew Tian Hoe	9,360	58.82	▲25.79
BN	Ong Teng Boon	6,552	41.18	▼18.25
Total valid votes		15,912	96.99	
Total rejected ballots		371	2.26	
Unreturned ballots		123	0.75	
Turnout		16,406	69.80	▲0.95
Registered electors		23,503		
Majority		2,808	17.64	▼8.76
DAP gain from BN		Swing		?
Source(s) "KEPUTUSAN PILIHAN RAYA UMUM DEWAN UNDANGAN NEGERI PERAK BAGI TAHUN 2008".

Perak state election, 2004
Party	Candidate	Votes	%	∆%
BN	Ng Chi Fa	9,016	59.43	▲8.97
DAP	Yew Tian Hoe	5,011	33.03	▲19.91
PKR	Abdul Rahman Uda Mat Isa	1,145	7.55	▼28.83
Total valid votes		15,172	95.13	
Total rejected ballots		253	1.59	
Unreturned ballots		524	3.29	
Turnout		15,949	68.85	▼1.53
Registered electors		23,164		
Majority		4,005	26.40	▲12.32
BN hold		Swing		
Source(s) "KEPUTUSAN PILIHAN RAYA UMUM DEWAN UNDANGAN NEGERI PERAK BAGI TAHUN 2004".

Perak state election, 1999
Party	Candidate	Votes	%	∆%
BN	Yeong Sing Chee	8,370	50.46	▼17.71
PKR	Mohd Zulkifli Ahmad	6,034	36.38	▲36.68
DAP	Abdul Hamid Salleh	2,182	13.12	▼8.18
Total valid votes		16,586	84.91	
Total rejected ballots		658	3.37	
Unreturned ballots		2,290	11.72	
Turnout		19,534	70.38	▼3.01
Registered electors		27,757		
Majority		2,336	14.08	▼24.03
BN hold		Swing		
Source(s) "KEPUTUSAN PILIHAN RAYA UMUM DEWAN UNDANGAN NEGERI PERAK BAGI TAHUN 1999".

Perak state election, 1995
Party	Candidate	Votes	%
BN	Yap Peng Lan	11,225	68.11
DAP	Ahmed Aki	4,889	30.00
Independent	Hwang Chai Hor	366	2.22
Total valid votes		16,480	88.11
Total rejected ballots		749	4.00
Unreturned ballots		1,475	7.89
Turnout		18,704	73.39
Registered electors		25,486	
Majority		6,336	38.11
This was a new constituency created.
Source(s) "KEPUTUSAN PILIHAN RAYA UMUM DEWAN UNDANGAN NEGERI PERAK BAGI TAHUN 1995".
