= Sivanesan Achalingam =

Malaysian politician (born 1956)

Yang Berhormat Dato' Sivanesan Achalingam DPMP MLA
- சிவனேசன் அச்சலிங்கம்

Member of the Perak State Executive Council
- Incumbent
- Assumed office 18 January 2023
- Monarch: Nazrin Shah
- Menteri Besar: Saarani Mohamad
- Portfolio: Human Resources, Health, Indian Community Affairs and National Integration
- Preceded by: Himself (Human Resources, Health, Indian Community Affairs); Abdul Yunus Jamahri (National Integration)
- Constituency: Sungkai
- In office 22 November 2022 – 18 January 2023
- Monarch: Nazrin Shah
- Menteri Besar: Saarani Mohamad
- Portfolio: Human Resources, Health & Indian Community Affairs (Note: Assumed portfolios on 23 November 2022 taking office.)
- Preceded by: Mohd Akmal Kamaruddin (Health); Ahmad Saidi Mohamad Daud (Human Resources); Portfolio established (Indian Community Affairs)
- Constituency: Sungkai
- In office 19 May 2018 – 10 March 2020
- Monarch: Nazrin Shah
- Menteri Besar: Ahmad Faizal Azumu
- Portfolio: Health, Consumer Affairs, Civil Community, National Integration & Human Resources
- Preceded by: Mah Hang Soon (Health & National Integration); Samsudin Abu Hassan (Consumer Affairs & Civil Community); Shahrul Zaman Yahya (Human Resources)
- Succeeded by: Ahmad Saidi Mohamad Daud (Health); Saarani Mohammad (Consumer Affairs); Razman Zakaria (Civil Community); Ahmad Faizal Azumu (National Integration & Human Resources)
- Constituency: Sungkai
- In office 28 March 2008 – 10 February 2009
- Monarch: Azlan Shah
- Menteri Besar: Mohammad Nizar Jamaluddin
- Portfolio: Health, Environment & Human Resources
- Preceded by: Tan Chin Meng
- Succeeded by: Mah Hang Soon
- Constituency: Sungkai

Member of the Perak State Legislative Assembly for Sungkai
- Incumbent
- Assumed office 8 March 2008
- Preceded by: Ganesan Retanam (BN–MIC)
- Majority: 1,454 (2008); 3,511 (2013); 6,493 (2018); 5,238 (2022)

Faction represented in Perak State Legislative Assembly
- 2008–2018: Democratic Action Party
- 2018–: Pakatan Harapan

Personal details
- Born: Sivanesan a/l Achalingam; 15 March 1956 (age 70) Perak, Federation of Malaya (now Malaysia)
- Citizenship: Malaysian
- Party: Democratic Action Party (DAP)
- Other political affiliations: Pakatan Rakyat (PR) (2008–2015); Pakatan Harapan (PH) (since 2015)
- Occupation: Politician

Sivanesan a/l Achalingam (born 15 March 1956) is a Malaysian politician who has served as Member of the Perak State Executive Council (EXCO) in the Pakatan Rakyat (PR), Pakatan Harapan (PH) and Barisan Nasional (BN) state administrations under Menteris Besar Mohammad Nizar Jamaluddin, Ahmad Faizal Azumu and Saarani Mohamad from March 2008 to the collapse of the PR state administration in February 2009, from May 2018 to the collapse of the PH state administration in March 2020 and again since November 2022. He has also served as Member of the Perak State Legislative Assembly (MLA) for Sungkai since March 2008. He is a member of the Democratic Action Party (DAP), a component party of the PH coalition.

== Political career ==
Sivanesan Achalingam held the portfolio of Human Resources, Health, Indian Community Affairs and National Integration in Perak exco since 2023.

== Election results ==
Perak State Legislative Assembly
Year	Constituency	Candidate	Votes	Pct	Opponent(s)	Votes	Pct	Ballots cast	Majority	Turnout
2004	N57 Sungkai	Sivanesan Achalingam (DAP)	4,389	40.92%	Ganesan Retanam (MIC)	6,334	59.08%	11,316	1,945	64.23%
2008	N57 Sungkai	Sivanesan Achalingam (DAP)	6,323	56.50%	Veerasingam Suppiah (MIC)	4,869	43.50%	11,719	1,454	67.78%
2013	N57 Sungkai	Sivanesan Achalingam (DAP)	9,314	61.61%	Goh Kim Swee (MCA)	5,803	38.39%	15,393	3,511	80.20%
2018	N57 Sungkai	Sivanesan Achalingam (DAP)	9,631	72.56%	Elango Vadiveloo (MIC)	3,138	23.64%	13,612	6,493	79.50%
2018	N57 Sungkai	Sivanesan Achalingam (DAP)	9,631	72.56%	Appalasamy Jetakiah (PAS)	505	3.80%	13,612	6,493	79.50%
2022	N57 Sungkai	Sivanesan Achalingam (DAP)	9,549	58.97%	Elango Vadiveloo (MIC)	4,311	26.62%	16,192	5,238	69.27%
2022	N57 Sungkai	Sivanesan Achalingam (DAP)	9,549	58.97%	Thilak Raj Gunasekaran (PAS)	1,744	10.77%	16,192	5,238	69.27%
2022	N57 Sungkai	Sivanesan Achalingam (DAP)	9,549	58.97%	Mahhadee Ramli (IND)	588	3.63%	16,192	5,238	69.27%

== Honours ==
=== Honours of Malaysia ===
- Perak
  - Knight Commander of the Order of the Perak State Crown (DPMP) – Dato' (2025)
