= Selama (state constituency) =

Political subdivision in Malaysia

Selama (N05)
Perak constituency

State constituency
- Legislature: Perak State Legislative Assembly
MLA
Mohd Akmal Kamaruddin
PN
- Constituency created: 1959
- First contested: 1959
- Last contested: 2022

Demographics
- Electors (2022): 22,339

Selama is a state constituency in Perak, Malaysia, that has been represented in the Perak State Legislative Assembly.

== Demographics ==
Ethnic breakdown of Selama's electorate as of 2022
1. Malay (86.5%)
2. Chinese (7.34%)
3. Indian (5.78%)
4. Other ethnicities (0.38%)

== History ==
=== Polling districts ===
According to the federal gazette issued on 31 October 2022, the Selama constituency is divided into 15 polling districts.

State constituency	Polling Districts	Code	Location
Selama (N05）	Ulu Selama	056/05/01	SK Sungai Siputeh
Selama (N05）	Ulu Selama Barat	056/05/02	SK Bukit Bertam
Selama (N05）	Banggol Jas	056/05/03	SMK Sungai Bayor
Selama (N05）	Sungai Rambutan	056/05/04	SK Toh Rakna Sakti
Selama (N05）	Sungai Bedarah	056/05/05	SK Toh Rahna Sakti
Selama (N05）	Kampong Sungai Siputeh	056/05/06	SK Sungai Siputeh
Selama (N05）	Kampong Gorok	056/05/07	SK Sungai Bayor
Selama (N05）	Sungai Bayor	056/05/08	SK Sungai Bayor
Selama (N05）	Ulu Mengkuang	056/05/09	SK Ulu Mengkuang
Selama (N05）	Rantau Panjang	056/05/10	SK Rantau Panjang
Selama (N05）	Rantau Panjang Utara	056/05/11	SJK (C) Chi Sheng (2)
Selama (N05）	Pekan Selama	056/05/12	SK Selama
Selama (N05）	Selama Utara	056/06/13	SK Sri Selama
Selama (N05）	Sungai Terap	056/05/14	SJK (C) Sungai Terap
Selama (N05）	Bukit Kelian	056/05/15	SMK Dato' Hj Hussein

=== Representation history ===
Perak State Legislative Assemblyman for Selama
Assembly	No	Years	Member	Party
Constituency created
1st	N03	1959-1964	Hussein Yaacob	Alliance (UMNO)
2nd	N03	1964-1969	Hussein Yaacob	Alliance (UMNO)
		1969-1971	Assembly Dissolved	
3rd	N03	1969-1971	Hussein Yaacob	Alliance (UMNO)
3rd	N03	1971-1974	Hussein Yaacob	BN (UMNO)
4th	N03	1974 – 1978	Abdul Aziz Ahmad	BN (UMNO)
5th	N03	1978 – 1982	Abdul Aziz Ahmad	BN (UMNO)
6th	N03	1982 – 1986	Abdul Aziz Ahmad	BN (UMNO)
7th	N03	1986 – 1990	Md. Kassim Mahmud	BN (UMNO)
8th	N03	1990 – 1995	Md. Kassim Mahmud	BN (UMNO)
9th	N04	1995 – 1999	Mohd Ali Mohd Isa	BN (UMNO)
10th	N04	1999 – 2004	Mohd Ali Mohd Isa	BN (UMNO)
11th	N05	2004 – 2008	Mohamad Daud Mohd Yusoff	BN (UMNO)
12th	N05	2008 – 2013	Mohamad Daud Mohd Yusoff	BN (UMNO)
13th	N05	2013 – 2018	Mohamad Daud Mohd Yusoff	BN (UMNO)
14th	N05	2018 – 2020	Mohd Akmal Kamaruddin	PAS
14th	N05	2020 – 2022	Mohd Akmal Kamaruddin	PN (PAS)
15th	N05	2022–present	Mohd Akmal Kamaruddin	PN (PAS)

== Election results ==
Perak state election, 2022
Party	Candidate	Votes	%	∆%
PN	Mohd Akmal Kamaruddin	10,358	58.32	▲58.32
BN	Faizul Rizal	5,000	28.15	▼10.13
PH	Razali Ismail	2,343	13.19	▲13.19
Independent	Osman Sidek	61	0.34	▲0.34
Total valid votes		18,052	100.00	
Total rejected ballots		263		
Unreturned ballots		27		
Turnout		18,342	80.81	▼2.02
Registered electors		22,339		
Majority		5,358	30.17	▲28.05
PN hold		Swing		

Perak state election, 2018
Party	Candidate	Votes	%	∆%
PAS	Mohd Akmal Kamaruddin	5,516	40.40	▼6.22
BN	Faizul Arby Mohd. Shokor	5,227	38.28	▼13.87
PKR	Razali Ismail	2,618	19.18	▲19.18
Total valid votes		13,361	97.86	
Total rejected ballots		235	1.72	
Unreturned ballots		57	0.42	
Turnout		13,653	82.83	▼3.97
Registered electors		16,483		
Majority		289	2.12	▼2.51
PAS gain from BN		Swing		?
Source(s) "RESULTS OF CONTESTED ELECTION AND STATEMENTS OF THE POLL AFTER THE OFFICIAL ADDITION OF VOTES".

Perak state election, 2013
Party	Candidate	Votes	%	∆%
BN	Mohamad Daud Mohd Yusoff	6,854	51.25	▲0.60
PAS	Mohd Akmal Kamaruddin	6,235	46.62	▼0.60
Total valid votes		13,089	97.88	
Total rejected ballots		183	1.37	
Unreturned ballots		101	0.76	
Turnout		13,373	86.80	▲8.89
Registered electors		15,403		
Majority		619	4.63	▼3.33
BN hold		Swing		
Source(s) "KEPUTUSAN PILIHAN RAYA UMUM DEWAN UNDANGAN NEGERI". Archived from the original on 2022-05-20.

Perak state election, 2008
Party	Candidate	Votes	%	∆%
BN	Mohamad Daud Mohd Yusoff	5,240	50.65	▼8.31
PAS	Razali Ismail	4,885	49.35	▲8.31
Total valid votes		10,125	97.86	
Total rejected ballots		201	1.94	
Unreturned ballots		20	0.19	
Turnout		10,346	77.91	▲2.66
Registered electors		13,279		
Majority		355	1.30	▼16.62
BN hold		Swing		
Source(s) "KEPUTUSAN PILIHAN RAYA UMUM DEWAN UNDANGAN NEGERI PERAK BAGI TAHUN 2008".

Perak state election, 2004
Party	Candidate	Votes	%	∆%
BN	Mohamad Daud Mohd Yusoff	5,973	58.96	▲4.44
PAS	Mohd. Dhari Othman	3,920	41.04	▼4.44
Total valid votes		9,893	97.66	
Total rejected ballots		209	2.06	
Unreturned ballots		28	0.28	
Turnout		10,130	75.25	▲7.20
Registered electors		13,462		
Majority		2,053	17.92	▲5.71
BN hold		Swing		
Source(s) "KEPUTUSAN PILIHAN RAYA UMUM DEWAN UNDANGAN NEGERI PERAK BAGI TAHUN 2004".

Perak state election, 1999
Party	Candidate	Votes	%	∆%
BN	Mohd Ali Mohd Isa	6,915	54.52	▼18.31
PAS	Mohd. Faiz	5,366	42.31	▲17.67
Total valid votes		12,281	96.82	
Total rejected ballots		366	2.89	
Unreturned ballots		37	0.29	
Turnout		12,684	68.05	▼0.14
Registered electors		18,638		
Majority		1,549	12.21	▼35.98
BN hold		Swing		
Source(s) "KEPUTUSAN PILIHAN RAYA UMUM DEWAN UNDANGAN NEGERI PERAK BAGI TAHUN 1999".

Perak state election, 1995
Party	Candidate	Votes	%	∆%
BN	Mohd Ali Mohd Isa	8,827	72.83	▼0.91
PAS	Mohd. Yaakob Mohd. Zabidi	2,986	24.64	▲3.63
Total valid votes		11,813	97.47	
Total rejected ballots		258	2.13	
Unreturned ballots		49	0.40	
Turnout		12,120	68.16	▼3.31
Registered electors		17,781		
Majority		5,841	48.19	▲4.54
BN hold		Swing		
Source(s) "KEPUTUSAN PILIHAN RAYA UMUM DEWAN UNDANGAN NEGERI PERAK BAGI TAHUN 1995".

Perak state election, 1990
Party	Candidate	Votes	%	∆%
BN	Md. Kassim Mahmud	8,805	73.74	▲2.08
PAS	Ahmad Yusoh	2,509	21.01	▼3.89
Independent	Mohammad Rodzi Awang Kechek	198	1.66	▲1.66
Total valid votes		11,512	96.41	
Total rejected ballots		429	3.59	
Unreturned ballots		0	0.00	
Turnout		11,941	71.47	▲2.56
Registered electors		16,707		
Majority		6,296	52.73	▲5.97
BN hold		Swing		
Source(s) "KEPUTUSAN PILIHAN RAYA UMUM DEWAN UNDANGAN NEGERI PERAK BAGI TAHUN 1990".

Perak state election, 1986
Party	Candidate	Votes	%	
BN	Md. Kassim Mahmud	7,977	71.66	▼1.51
PAS	Mohamad Ismail	2,772	24.90	▲1.51
Total valid votes		10,749	100.00	
Total rejected ballots		382		
Unreturned ballots		0		
Turnout		11,131	68.91	▼6.84
Registered electors		16,152		
Majority		5,205	48.42	▲2.09
BN hold		Swing		
Source(s) "KEPUTUSAN PILIHAN RAYA UMUM DEWAN UNDANGAN NEGERI PERAK BAGI TAHUN 1986".

Perak state election, 1982
Party	Candidate	Votes	%	∆%
BN	Abd. Aziz Ahmad	6,242	73.17	▲4.76
PAS	Mohamed Wazi Che Ngah	2,289	26.83	▼3.13
Total valid votes		8,531	100.00	
Total rejected ballots		160		
Unreturned ballots		0		
Turnout		8,691	75.76	▼3.55
Registered electors		11,472		
Majority		3,953	46.34	▲7.89
BN hold		Swing		

Perak state election, 1978
Party	Candidate	Votes	%	∆%
BN	Abdul Aziz Amad	5,208	68.41	▲3.38
PAS	Ahmad Yusoh	2,281	29.96	▲29.96
DAP	Muhammad Mustafa Zakaria	124	1.63	▲1.63
Total valid votes		7,613	100.00	
Total rejected ballots		335		
Unreturned ballots		0		
Turnout		7,948	79.31	▲6.95
Registered electors		10,022		
Majority		2,927	38.45	▲8.39
BN hold		Swing		

Perak state election, 1974
Party	Candidate	Votes	%	∆%
BN	Abdul Aziz Amad	4,413	65.03	▲65.03
Independent	Mohamad Adnan Mohamad Ariffin	2,373	34.97	▲31.47
Total valid votes		6,786	100.00	
Total rejected ballots		274		
Unreturned ballots		0		
Turnout		7,060	72.36	▼2.75
Registered electors		9,757		
Majority		2,040	30.06	▼8.00
BN hold		Swing		-

Perak state election, 1969
Party	Candidate	Votes	%	∆%
Alliance	Hussein Yaacob	7,384	67.28	▼8.16
PMIP	Ahmad Yusoh	3,207	29.22	▲4.66
Independent	Zainal Abidin Awang Che Mas	384	3.50	▲3.50
Total valid votes		10,975	100.00	
Total rejected ballots		722		
Unreturned ballots		0		
Turnout		11,697	75.11	▼3.97
Registered electors		15,573		
Majority		4,177	38.06	▼12.81
Alliance hold		Swing		

Perak state election, 1964
Party	Candidate	Votes	%	∆%
Alliance	Hussein Yaacob	7,705	75.44	▲0.06
PMIP	Mohd Radzi Abdul Rahman	2,509	24.56	▼0.06
Total valid votes		10,214	100.00	
Total rejected ballots		658		
Unreturned ballots		0		
Turnout		10,872	79.08	▲7.45
Registered electors		13,748		
Majority		5,196	50.87	▲0.11
Alliance hold		Swing		

Perak state election, 1959
Party	Candidate	Votes	%
Alliance	Hussein Yaacob	6,622	75.38
PMIP	Kamarun Mohd. Hassan	2,163	24.62
Total valid votes		8,785	100.00
Total rejected ballots		179	
Unreturned ballots		0	
Turnout		8,964	71.63
Registered electors		12,515	
Majority		4,459	50.76
This was a new constituency created.
