= Mohamad Zahir Abdul Khalid =

Malaysian politician

Yang Berhormat Dato' Seri Mohamad Zahir Abdul Khalid SPMP DPCM
- محمد ظاهر بن عبدالخالد

17th Speaker of the Perak State Legislative Assembly
- Incumbent
- Assumed office 12 May 2020
- Monarch: Nazrin Shah
- Deputy: Khalil Yahaya (2020–2022); Jenny Choy Tsi Jen (since 2022)
- Menteri Besar: Ahmad Faizal Azumu (2020); Saarani Mohamad (since 2020)
- Preceded by: Ngeh Koo Ham
- Constituency: Non-MLA

Member of the Perak State Legislative Assembly for Kamunting
- In office 8 March 2008 – 9 May 2018
- Preceded by: Abdul Malek Mohamed Hanafiah (BN–UMNO)
- Succeeded by: Muhd Fadhil Nuruddin (PH–AMANAH)
- Majority: 555 (2008); 887 (2013)

Exco roles (Perak)
- 2009–2013: Chairman of the Education, Higher Education, Science and Technology
- 2013–2018: Chairman of the Industry, Investment and Corridor Development

Faction represented in Perak State Legislative Assembly
- 2008–2018: Barisan Nasional

Personal details
- Born: Mohamad Zahir bin Abdul Khalid; 13 January 1968 (age 58) Taiping, Perak, Malaysia
- Citizenship: Malaysian
- Party: United Malays National Organisation (UMNO)
- Other political affiliations: Barisan Nasional (BN)
- Spouse: Aznee Abu Samah
- Children: 2
- Education: BSc Economics and Development Studies(Honours) University of Wales, Swansea (1991), LLB (Honours) University of Leeds (1995)
- Alma mater: Malay College Kuala Kangsar (MCKK), Stafford House Tutorial College Canterbury, UK, University of Wales, Swansea, University of Leeds, UK
- Occupation: Politician

Mohamad Zahir bin Abdul Khalid is a Malaysian politician who has served as Speaker of the Perak State Legislative Assembly since May 2020. He served as Member of the Perak State Executive Council (EXCO) in the Barisan Nasional (BN) state administration under former Menteri Besar Zambry Abdul Kadir from May 2009 to the collapse of the BN administration in May 2018 and Member of the Perak State Legislative Assembly (MLA) for Kamunting from March 2008 to May 2018. He is a member of the United Malays National Organisation (UMNO), a component party of the BN coalition.

== Election results ==
Perak State Legislative Assembly
Year	Constituency	Candidate	Votes	Pct	Opponent(s)	Votes	Pct	Ballots cast	Majority	Turnout
2008	N16 Kamunting	Mohamad Zahir Abdul Khalid (UMNO)	7,975	51.80%	Muhamad Apardi Sharri (PAS)	7,420	48.20%	16,179	555	74.64%
2013	N16 Kamunting	Mohamad Zahir Abdul Khalid (UMNO)	11,784	51.96%	Mohd Fakhrudin Abdul Aziz (PAS)	10,897	48.04%	22,893	887	84.10%
2018	N16 Kamunting	Mohamad Zahir Abdul Khalid (UMNO)	8,118	34.85%	Muhd Fadhil Nuruddin (AMANAH)	9,898	42.50%	23,980	1,780	79.90%
2018	N16 Kamunting	Mohamad Zahir Abdul Khalid (UMNO)	8,118	34.85%	Mohd Fakhrudin Abdul Aziz (PAS)	5,276	22.65%	23,980	1,780	79.90%

== Honours ==
- Perak
  - Knight Grand Commander of the Order of the Perak State Crown (SPMP) – Dato' Seri (2025)
  - Knight Commander of the Order of Cura Si Manja Kini (DPCM) – Dato' (2010)
