= Speaker of the Perak State Legislative Assembly =

Presiding officer of the legislature of Perak

- Yang di-Pertua Dewan Undangan Negeri Perak
- Coat of arms of Perak
- Incumbent; Mohamad Zahir Abdul Khalid since 12 May 2020
- Perak State Legislative Assembly
- Style: Yang Berhormat; Tuan Yang di-Pertua (formal); Tuan Speaker/Tuan Pengerusi (informal and within the assembly)
- Member of: Committee of Standing Orders, Committee of Rights and Freedoms, Committee of Member Welfare, Committee of Special Select on Enactments, Committee of Special Select on New Building, Committee of Special Select on Stray Animals
- Reports to: Perak State Legislative Assembly
- Seat: Level 2, Bangunan Perak Darul Ridzuan, Jalan Panglima Bukit Gantang Wahab, 30000, Ipoh Perak.
- Appointer: Elected by members of the Perak State Legislative Assembly
- Term length: Elected at the start of each Perak State Legislative Assembly, upon a vacancy
- Constituting instrument: Constitution of Perak
- Inaugural holder: Sulaiman Bulun
- Formation: 16 April 1959; 67 years ago
- Deputy: Deputy Speaker of the Perak State Legislative Assembly
- Website: dewan.perak.gov.my

The Speaker of the Perak State Legislative Assembly is the highest-ranking presiding officer in the Perak State Legislative Assembly, the unicameral legislature of the Malaysian state of Perak. They are responsible for convening sessions of the state's legislative body, organising debates, and examining the admissibility of petitions, bills and amendments. In the absence of the Speaker, the deputy will take their place. The speaker is selected through ballot in the first session of a new legislative assembly.

The incumbent Speaker is Mohamad Zahir Abdul Khalid. He was elected since 12 May 2020.

== Election ==
The Perak State Legislative Assembly may from time to time elect a person of eligibility to become a Speaker of the assembly. A speaker may not be elected to be a Speaker unless he is a member or qualified to be a member of the legislative assembly. The speaker may resign at any time. He must vacate his office when either the legislative assembly first meet after a general election, or upon being disqualified to be a speaker, or upon the dissolution of the assembly, or on his ceasing to be a member of assembly other than because of the dissolution of the legislative assembly or ceased to be qualified of a member. A Deputy Speaker may also be chosen from any member of the legislative assembly.

== List of Speakers of the Perak State Legislative Assembly ==
The following is the list of Speakers of the State Legislative Assembly since 1959:

Colour key (for political parties):
Alliance / Barisan Nasional Pakatan Rakyat Pakatan Harapan

No.	Portrait	Name (Birth–Death) (Constituency)	Term of office			Party (Note: This column names only the Speaker's party. The state legislaltive assembly he heads may be a complex coalition of several parties and independents; those are not listed here.)	Election	Assembly
No.	Portrait	Name (Birth–Death) (Constituency)	Took office	Left office	Time in office	Party	Election	Assembly
1.		Sulaiman Bulun (?–?); MLA for Hutan Melintang	16 April 1959	22 November 1963	4 years, 221 days	Alliance (UMNO)	1959	1st
2.		Dato' Seri; Ali Zaini Mohd Zain (?–?); MLA for Karai	7 May 1964	31 July 1974	10 years, 86 days	Alliance (UMNO)	1964	2nd
2.		Dato' Seri; Ali Zaini Mohd Zain (?–?); MLA for Karai	7 May 1964	31 July 1974	10 years, 86 days	Alliance (UMNO)	1969	3rd
3.		Dato'; Shafie Mat Saman (?–?); MLA for Manong	28 September 1974	17 July 1978	3 years, 293 days	BN (UMNO)	1974	4th
4.		Tan Sri Dato' Haji; Ahmad Azizuddin Zainal Abidin (?–?); MLA for Belanja	8 August 1978	29 March 1982	3 years, 234 days	BN (UMNO)	1978	5th
5.		Dato' Haji; Shamsuddin Din (?–?); MLA for Temengor	24 May 1982	19 July 1986	4 years, 57 days	BN (UMNO)	1982	6th
6.		Dato' Haji; Abdul Malik Ahmad (?–?); MLA for Pengkalan Baharu	15 September 1987	5 July 1988	295 days	BN (UMNO)	1986	7th
7.		Dato' Haji; Umar Ismail (?–?); MLA for Lenggong	5 September 1988	5 October 1990	2 years, 31 days	BN (UMNO)	–	7th
8.		Dato' Haji; Mohd Arshad Abdullah (?–?); MLA for Changkat Jong	14 November 1990	6 April 1995	4 years, 144 days	BN (UMNO)	1990	8th
9.		Dato' Seri Haji; Mohamed Nazri Abd Rahim (?–?); MLA for Sungai Manik	26 May 1995	10 November 1999	4 years, 169 days	BN (UMNO)	1995	9th
10.		Dato' Seri Haji; Junus Wahid (?–?); MLA for Slim	20 December 1999	16 April 2004	4 years, 119 days	BN (UMNO)	1999	10th
11.		Dato' Haji; Mat Isa Ismail (?–?); MLA for Changkat Jering	16 April 2004	24 April 2008	4 years, 9 days	BN (UMNO)	2004	11th
12.		Sivakumar Varatharaju Naidu (b.1970); MLA for Tronoh	25 April 2008	6 May 2009	1 year, 12 days	PR (DAP)	2008	12th
13.		Dato'; Ganesan Retanam (b.1952); Non-MLA	7 May 2009	27 June 2013	4 years, 52 days	BN (MIC)	–	12th
14.		Dato' Sri; Devamany Krishnasamy (b.1958); Non-MLA	28 June 2013	27 June 2016	3 years, 0 days	BN (MIC)	2013	13th
15.		Dato'; Thangasvari Suppiah (b.?); Non-MLA	9 August 2016	2 July 2018	1 year, 328 days	BN (MIC)	–	13th
16.		Dato'; Ngeh Koo Ham (b.1961); Non-MLA	2 July 2018	12 May 2020	1 year, 316 days	PH (DAP)	2018	14th
17.		Dato' Seri; Mohamad Zahir Abdul Khalid (b.1968); Non-MLA	12 May 2020	Incumbent	6 years, 120 days	BN (UMNO)	–	14th
17.		Dato' Seri; Mohamad Zahir Abdul Khalid (b.1968); Non-MLA	12 May 2020	Incumbent	6 years, 120 days	BN (UMNO)	2022	15th

== See also ==
- Perak
- Perak State Legislative Assembly
