= Sungkai (state constituency) =

Sungkai (N57)
Perak constituency

State constituency
- Legislature: Perak State Legislative Assembly
MLA
Sivanesan Achalingam
PH
- Constituency created: 1986
- First contested: 1986
- Last contested: 2022

Demographics
- Electors (2022): 23,375

Sungkai is a state constituency in Perak, Malaysia, that has been represented in the Perak State Legislative Assembly. The constituency is mandated to return a single member to the Perak State Legislative Assembly under the first past the post voting system.

== Demographics ==
Ethnic breakdown of Sungkai's electorate as of 2022
1. Chinese (54.1%)
2. Malay (20.8%)
3. Indian (17.7%)
4. Other ethnicities (7.42%)

== History ==
=== Polling districts ===
According to the federal gazette issued on 31 October 2022, the Tanjong Malim constituency is divided into 49 polling districts.

State constituency	Polling districts	Code	Location
Sungkai (N57)	Pos Gedong	077/57/01	SK Pos Gedong
Sungkai (N57)	Jalan Bruseh	077/57/02	SK Bidor; SK Kampung Senta
Sungkai (N57)	Bidor Tengah	077/57/03	SJK (C) Choong Hua (1)
Sungkai (N57)	Bidor Baharu	077/57/04	SK Seri Bidor
Sungkai (N57)	Pekan Bidor	077/57/05	SMK Syeikh Abdul Ghani
Sungkai (N57)	Bidor Barat	077/57/06	SMJK Choong Hua
Sungkai (N57)	Bidor Station Utara	077/57/07	SJK (C) Pin Min
Sungkai (N57)	Kampong Bahru Jalan Sungkai	077/57/08	SMK Syeikh Abdul Gahni
Sungkai (N57)	Pekan Pasir	077/57/09	SJK (C) Pekan Pasir
Sungkai (N57)	Bikam	077/57/10	SK Bikam
Sungkai (N57)	Kampong Baharu Bikam	077/57/11	SJK (C) Kuala Bikam
Sungkai (N57)	Sungkai	077/57/12	SMK Sungkai
Sungkai (N57)	Pekan Sungkai	077/57/13	SMK Sungkai
Sungkai (N57)	Buloh Telor	077/57/14	SMK Sungkai

=== Representation history ===
Members of the Legislative Assembly for Sungkai
Assembly	No	Years	Name	Party
Constituency created from Bidor and Chenderiang
7th	N45	1986-1990	Kumaran Karunagaran	BN (MIC)
8th	N45	1990-1995	Veerasingam Suppiah	BN (MIC)
9th	N51	1995-1999	Veerasingam Suppiah	BN (MIC)
10th	N51	1999-2004	Ganesan Retanam	BN (MIC)
11th	N57	2004-2008	Ganesan Retanam	BN (MIC)
12th	N57	2008-2013	Sivanesan Achalingam	PR (DAP)
13th	N57	2013-2015	Sivanesan Achalingam	PR (DAP)
13th	N57	2015-2018	Sivanesan Achalingam	PH (DAP)
14th	N57	2018-2022	Sivanesan Achalingam	PH (DAP)
15th	N57	2022–present	Sivanesan Achalingam	PH (DAP)

== Election results ==
Perak state election, 2022
Party	Candidate	Votes	%	∆%
PH	Sivanesan Achalingam	9,549	58.97	▲58.97
BN	V. Elango	4,311	26.62	▲2.98
PN	Thilak Raj Gunasekaran	1,744	10.77	▲10.77
Independent	Mahhadee	588	3.63	▲3.63
Total valid votes		16,192	100.00	
Total rejected ballots		274		
Unreturned ballots		36		
Turnout		16,502	70.60	▲21.68
Registered electors		23,375		
Majority		5,238	32.35	▼16.57
PH hold		Swing		

Perak state election, 2018
Party	Candidate	Votes	%	∆%
PKR	Sivanesan Achalingam	9,631	72.56	▲72.56
BN	V. Elango	3,138	23.64	▼14.75
PAS	Appalasamy Jetakiah	505	3.80	▲3.80
Total valid votes		13,274	97.52	
Total rejected ballots		286	2.10	
Unreturned ballots		52	0.38	
Turnout		13,612	79.28	▼0.92
Registered electors		17,128		
Majority		6,493	48.92	▲25.70
PKR hold		Swing		
Source(s) "RESULTS OF CONTESTED ELECTION AND STATEMENTS OF THE POLL AFTER THE OFFICIAL ADDITION OF VOTES".

Perak state election, 2013
Party	Candidate	Votes	%	∆%
DAP	Sivanesan Achalingam	9,314	61.61	▲5.11
BN	Goh Kim Swee	5,803	38.39	▼5.11
Total valid votes		15,117	97.78	
Total rejected ballots		276	1.79	
Unreturned ballots		67	0.43	
Turnout		15,460	80.20	▲12.42
Registered electors		19,285		
Majority		3,511	23.22	▲10.22
DAP hold		Swing		
Source(s) "KEPUTUSAN PILIHAN RAYA UMUM DEWAN UNDANGAN NEGERI".

Perak state election, 2008
Party	Candidate	Votes	%	∆%
DAP	Sivanesan Achalingam	6,323	56.50	▲15.57
BN	Veerasingam Suppiah	4,869	43.50	▼15.57
Total valid votes		11,192	95.50	
Total rejected ballots		485	4.14	
Unreturned ballots		42	0.36	
Turnout		11,719	67.78	▲3.55
Registered electors		17,290		
Majority		1,454	13.00	▼5.14
DAP gain from BN		Swing		?
Source(s) "KEPUTUSAN PILIHAN RAYA UMUM DEWAN UNDANGAN NEGERI PERAK BAGI TAHUN 2008".

Perak state election, 2004
Party	Candidate	Votes	%	∆%
BN	Ganesan Retanam	6,334	59.07	▼0.64
DAP	Sivanesan Achalingam	4,389	40.93	▲0.64
Total valid votes		10,723	94.76	
Total rejected ballots		548	4.84	
Unreturned ballots		45	0.40	
Turnout		11,316	64.23	▲4.89
Registered electors		17,618		
Majority		1,945	18.14	▼1.28
BN hold		Swing		
Source(s) "KEPUTUSAN PILIHAN RAYA UMUM DEWAN UNDANGAN NEGERI PERAK BAGI TAHUN 2004".

Perak state election, 1999
Party	Candidate	Votes	%	∆%
BN	Ganesan Retanam	7,545	59.71	▼13.02
DAP	Bathamanathan Rajoo	5,091	40.29	▲13.02
Total valid votes		12,636	95.96	
Total rejected ballots		470	3.57	
Unreturned ballots		62	0.47	
Turnout		13,168	59.34	▼3.61
Registered electors		22,190		
Majority		2,454	19.42	▼25.12
BN hold		Swing		
Source(s) "KEPUTUSAN PILIHAN RAYA UMUM DEWAN UNDANGAN NEGERI PERAK BAGI TAHUN 1999".

Perak state election, 1995
Party	Candidate	Votes	%	∆%
BN	Veerasingam Suppiah	9,337	72.27	▲11.51
DAP	Kalimuthu Ranggayah	3,583	27.73	▼11.51
Total valid votes		12,920	95.13	
Total rejected ballots		626	4.61	
Unreturned ballots		36	0.27	
Turnout		13,582	62.95	▼4.45
Registered electors		21,577		
Majority		5,754	44.54	▲23.02
BN hold		Swing		
Source(s) "KEPUTUSAN PILIHAN RAYA UMUM DEWAN UNDANGAN NEGERI PERAK BAGI TAHUN 1995".

Perak state election, 1990
Party	Candidate	Votes	%	∆%
BN	Veerasingam Suppiah	7,757	60.76	▲6.93
DAP	John Richard Woodworth	5,010	39.24	▼3.34
Total valid votes		12,767	96.22	
Total rejected ballots		502	3.78	
Unreturned ballots		0	0.00	
Turnout		13,269	67.10	▼3.10
Registered electors		19,774		
Majority		2,747	21.52	▲10.27
BN hold		Swing		
Source(s) "KEPUTUSAN PILIHAN RAYA UMUM DEWAN UNDANGAN NEGERI PERAK BAGI TAHUN 1995".

Perak state election, 1986
Party	Candidate	Votes	%
BN	Kumaran Karunagaran	6,771	53.83
DAP	Loh Jee Mee	5,356	42.58
PAS	Ho Shing Chong @ Ghazali Ho	451	3.59
Total valid votes		12,578	97.74
Total rejected ballots		291	2.26
Unreturned ballots		0	0.00
Turnout		12,869	70.50
Registered electors		18,254	
Majority		1,415	11.25
This was a new constituency created.
Source(s) "KEPUTUSAN PILIHAN RAYA UMUM DEWAN UNDANGAN NEGERI PERAK BAGI TAHUN 1986".
