= Muhd Fadhil Nuruddin =

Malaysian politician

- محمد فاضل نورو الدين

Member of the Perak State Legislative Assembly for Kamunting
- In office 9 May 2018 – 19 November 2022
- Preceded by: Mohamad Zahir Abdul Khalid (BN–UMNO)
- Succeeded by: Mohd Fakhrudin Abdul Aziz (PN–PAS)
- Majority: 1,780 (2018)

Personal details
- Born: Muhd Fadhil bin Nuruddin; 6 November 1959 (age 66) Taiping, Perak
- Citizenship: Malaysian
- Party: AMANAH
- Other political affiliations: Pakatan Harapan
- Spouse: Latipah Yusof
- Children: 12
- Education: Universiti Sains Malaysia; University of Dundee; University of Malaya
- Occupation: Politician

Muhd Fadhil bin Nuruddin (born 6 November 1959) is a Malaysian politician who served as Member of the Perak State Legislative Assembly (MLA) for Kamunting from May 2018 to November 2022. He is a member of the National Trust Party (AMANAH), a component party of the Pakatan Harapan (PH) coalition.

== Education ==
He had studied in SK Methodist, SMK King Edward VII and Technical Institution Penang. He is a Bachelor in Civil Engineering, Master in Science and PhD in Concrete Technology.

== Early career ==
He was a professor of Civil Engineering in UiTM and UTP and was the Dean of Engineering Faculty. He was also a site engineer working for Peremba-Shimidzu Sdn Bhd in 1984.

== Politics ==
He is currently a Member of the AMANAH Perak Political Bureau, Chairman of AMANAH Perak Culture and Arts Bureau and AJK Biro, Chief of AMANAH Bukit Jana branch and Deputy Chief of AMANAH Taiping Division. He was also the Chairman of AMANAH National Integrity Bureau.

== Election results ==
Perak State Legislative Assembly
Year	Constituency	Candidate	Votes	Pct	Opponent(s)	Votes	Pct	Ballots cast	Majority	Turnout
2018	N16 Kamunting	Muhd Fadhil Nuruddin (AMANAH)	9,898	42.50%	Mohamad Zahir Abdul Khalid (UMNO)	8,118	34.85%	23,292	1,780	77.64%
2018	N16 Kamunting	Muhd Fadhil Nuruddin (AMANAH)	9,898	42.50%	Mohd Fakhrudin Abdul Aziz (PAS)	5,276	22.65%	23,292	1,780	77.64%
2022	N16 Kamunting	Muhd Fadhil Nuruddin (AMANAH)	9,945	33.53%	Mohd Fakhrudin Abdul Aziz (PAS)	13,045	43.98%	29,664	3,100	74.44%
2022	N16 Kamunting	Muhd Fadhil Nuruddin (AMANAH)	9,945	33.53%	Ahmad Shalimin Ahmad Shaffie (UMNO)	6,674	22.50%	29,664	3,100	74.44%
