= Ganesan Retanam =

Former Speaker of the Perak State Legislative Assembly

Yang Berbahagia Dato' Ganesan Retanam DPMP PMP AMP

13th Speaker of the Perak State Legislative Assembly
- In office 7 May 2009 – 27 June 2013
- Monarch: Azlan Shah
- Menteri Besar: Zambry Abdul Kadir
- Deputy: Hee Yit Foong
- Preceded by: Sivakumar Varatharaju
- Succeeded by: Devamany Krishnasamy
- Constituency: Non–MLA

Member of the Perak State Legislative Assembly for Sungkai
- In office 29 November 1999 – 8 March 2008
- Preceded by: Kalemuthu Veerasingam Suppiah (BN–MIC)
- Succeeded by: Sivanesan Achalingam (PR–DAP)
- Majority: 2,454 (1999); 1,945 (2004)

Personal details
- Born: 25 March 1952 (age 74) Perak, Federation of Malaya
- Party: Malaysian Indian Congress (MIC)
- Other political affiliations: Barisan Nasional (BN)
- Occupation: Politician

Ganesan a/l Retanam, also known as R. Ganesan is a Malaysian politician from Malaysian Indian Congress. He was the Speaker of Perak State Legislative Assembly from 2009 to 2013 and Member of Perak State Legislative Assembly for Sungkai from 1999 to 2008.

== Political career ==
=== Speaker of the Perak State Legislative Assembly ===
On 8 May 2009, a vote of no confidence towards the by-then Speaker of the Perak State Legislative Assembly, Sivakumar Varatharaju, had been passed. Then, Barisan Nasional has nominated Ganesan to the Office of Secretary of Perak State Legislative Assembly to be the new Speaker for the Perak State Legislative Assembly and he has been chosen as the new Speaker.

== Election results ==
Perak State Legislative Assembly
Year	Constituency	Candidate	Votes	Pct	Opponent(s)	Votes	Pct	Ballots cast	Majority	Turnout
1999	N51 Sungkai	Ganesan Retanam (MIC)	7,545	57.30%	Bathamanathan Rajoo (DAP)	5,091	38.66%	13,168	2,454	59.34%
2004	N57 Sungkai	Ganesan Retanam (MIC)	6,334	55.97%	Sivanesan Achalingam (DAP)	4,389	38.79%	11,316	1,945	64.23%

== Honours ==
- Perak
  - Knight Commander of the Order of the Perak State Crown (DPMP) – Dato' (2004)
  - Commander of the Order of the Perak State Crown (PMP) (2003)
  - Member of the Order of the Perak State Crown (AMP) (2001)

== See also ==
- Sungkai (state constituency)
- 2009 Perak constitutional crisis
