= Sitiawan (state constituency) =

Malaysian defunct state constituency

Perak constituency

Defunct state constituency
- Legislature: Perak State Legislative Assembly
- Constituency created: 1974
- Constituency abolished: 2018
- First contested: 1974
- Last contested: 2013

Sitiawan is a state constituency in Perak, Malaysia that has been represented in the Perak State Legislative Assembly since 1974 until 2018.

The state constituency was created in the 1974 and is mandated to return a single member to the Perak State Legislative Assembly under the first past the post voting system.

== History ==
It was abolished in 2018 when it was redistributed.

=== Representation history ===
Members of the Legislative Assembly for Sitiawan
Assembly	No	Years	Member	Party
Constituency created
4th	N33	1974–1978	R. Shanmugaveloo	BN (MIC)
5th	N33	1978–1982	Rajasegaran Samy Nathan	BN (MIC)
6th	N33	1982–1986	Rajasegaran Samy Nathan	BN (MIC)
7th	N40	1986–1990	Chen Lim Tiow (陳聯標)	DAP
8th	N40	1990–1995	Hu Chan You (胡昌佑)	GR (DAP)
9th	N46	1995–1999	Hu Chan You (胡昌佑)	GR (DAP)
10th	N46	1999–2004	Hu Chan You (胡昌佑)	BA (DAP)
11th	N50	2004–2008	Ngeh Koo Ham (倪可漢)	DAP
12th	N50	2008–2013	Ngeh Koo Ham (倪可漢)	PR (DAP)
13th	N50	2013–2015	Ngeh Koo Ham (倪可漢)	PR (DAP)
13th	N50	2015–2018	Ngeh Koo Ham (倪可漢)	PH (DAP)
Constituency renamed to Astaka

== Election results ==
Perak state election, 2013
Party	Candidate	Votes	%	∆%
DAP	Ngeh Koo Ham	17,292	75.96	
BN	Ting Tai Fook	5,472	24.04	
Total valid votes		22,764	100.00	
Total rejected ballots		334		
Unreturned ballots		0		
Turnout		23,098	80.92	
Registered electors		28,546		
Majority		11,820		
DAP hold		Swing		

Perak state election, 2008
Party	Candidate	Votes	%	∆%
DAP	Ngeh Koo Ham	12,381	76.27	
BN	Ding Siew Chee	3,852	23.73	
Total valid votes		16,233	100.00	
Total rejected ballots		363		
Unreturned ballots		49		
Turnout		16,645	70.43	
Registered electors		23,632		
Majority		8,529		
DAP hold		Swing		

Perak state election, 2004
Party	Candidate	Votes	%	∆%
DAP	Ngeh Koo Ham	9,874	67.58	
BN	Ling Mee Lin	4,737	32.42	
Total valid votes		14,611	100.00	
Total rejected ballots		539		
Unreturned ballots		0		
Turnout		15,150	65.63	
Registered electors		23,083		
Majority		5,137		
DAP hold		Swing		

Perak state election, 1999
Party	Candidate	Votes	%	∆%
DAP	Hu Chan You	8,469	61.04	
BN	Kong Ding You	5,406	38.96	
Total valid votes		13,875	100.00	
Total rejected ballots		402		
Unreturned ballots		0		
Turnout		14,277	63.82	
Registered electors		22,372		
Majority		3,063		
DAP hold		Swing		

Perak state election, 1995
Party	Candidate	Votes	%	∆%
DAP	Hu Chan You			
BN				
Total valid votes			100.00	
Total rejected ballots				
Unreturned ballots		0		
Turnout				
Registered electors				
Majority				
DAP hold		Swing		

Perak state election, 1990
Party	Candidate	Votes	%	∆%
DAP	Hu Chan You	9,309	56.49	
BN	Kong Cho Ha	7,171	43.51	
Total valid votes		16,480	100.00	
Total rejected ballots		534		
Unreturned ballots		0		
Turnout		17,014	68.17	
Registered electors		25,006		
Majority		2,138		
DAP hold		Swing		

Perak state election, 1986
Party	Candidate	Votes	%	∆%
DAP	Chen Lim Tiow			
BN				
Total valid votes			100.00	
Total rejected ballots				
Unreturned ballots		0		
Turnout				
Registered electors				
Majority				
DAP hold		Swing		

Perak state election, 1982
Party	Candidate	Votes	%	∆%
BN	Rajasegaran Samy Nathan			
DAP				
Total valid votes			100.00	
Total rejected ballots				
Unreturned ballots		0		
Turnout				
Registered electors				
Majority				
DAP hold		Swing		

Perak state election, 1978
Party	Candidate	Votes	%	∆%
BN	Rajasegaran Samy Nathan			
DAP				
Total valid votes			100.00	
Total rejected ballots				
Unreturned ballots		0		
Turnout				
Registered electors				
Majority				
DAP hold		Swing		

Perak state election, 1974
Party	Candidate	Votes	%	∆%
BN	R. Shanmugaveloo	5,663	51.95	
DAP	Siew Koh Mee	4,491	41.20	
Independent	Ding Kong Ling	746	6.84	
Total valid votes		10,900	100.00	
Total rejected ballots		598		
Unreturned ballots		0		
Turnout		11,498	75.60	
Registered electors		15,210		
Majority		1,172		
DAP hold		Swing		
