= Lim Keng Yaik =

Malaysian politician (1939–2012)

Yang Amat Berbahagia Tun Lim Keng Yaik SSM SSAP DGPN SPMP PNBS DPCM PCM
- 林敬益

Minister of Energy, Water and Communications
- In office 27 March 2004 – 18 March 2008
- Monarchs: Sirajuddin; Mizan Zainal Abidin
- Prime Minister: Abdullah Ahmad Badawi
- Deputy: Shaziman Abu Mansor
- Preceded by: Leo Moggie Irok
- Succeeded by: Shaziman Abu Mansor
- Constituency: Beruas

Minister of Primary Industries
- In office 11 August 1986 – 26 March 2004
- Monarchs: Iskandar; Azlan Shah; Ja'afar; Salahuddin; Sirajuddin
- Prime Minister: Mahathir Mohamad; Abdullah Ahmad Badawi
- Deputy: Mohd Radzi Sheikh Ahmad; Alias Ali; Tengku Mahmud Tengku Mansor; Siti Zainaboon Abu Bakar; Hishammuddin Hussein; Anifah Aman
- Preceded by: Paul Leong Khee Seong
- Succeeded by: Peter Chin Fah Kui (as Minister of Plantation Industries and Commodities)
- Constituency: Beruas

3rd President of Parti Gerakan Rakyat Malaysia
- In office 1980 – 8 April 2007
- Deputy: Kerk Choo Ting; Koh Tsu Koon
- Preceded by: Lim Chong Eu
- Succeeded by: Koh Tsu Koon

Member of the Malaysian Parliament for Beruas
- In office 3 August 1986 – 8 March 2008
- Preceded by: Michael Chen Wing Sum (BN–MCA)
- Succeeded by: Ngeh Koo Ham (DAP)
- Majority: 1,015 (1986); 863 (1990); 11,254 (1995); 1,455 (1999); 4,564 (2004)

Personal details
- Born: Lim Keng Yaik; 8 April 1939 Tapah, Perak, Federated Malay States, British Malaya (now Malaysia)
- Died: 22 December 2012 (aged 73) Petaling Jaya, Selangor, Malaysia
- Citizenship: Malaysian
- Party: Malaysian Chinese Association (MCA) (1968–1973); Parti Gerakan Rakyat Malaysia (Gerakan) (1973–2008)
- Other political affiliations: Alliance (1968–1973); Barisan Nasional (1973–2008)
- Spouse: Toh Puan Wong Yoon Chuan
- Children: Datuk Lim Si Pin; Lim Si Ching; Lim Poi Giok; Lim Poi Jing
- Education: Queen's University Belfast
- Occupation: Medical doctor

Lim Keng Yaik (Chinese: 林敬益; pinyin: Lín Jìngyì; Jyutping: Lam4 Ging3 Jik1; Pe̍h-ōe-jī: Lîm Kèng-ek; 8 April 1939 – 22 December 2012) was a Malaysian politician and former Minister of Energy, Water and Communications in the Malaysian cabinet. He was the third president of Parti Gerakan Rakyat Malaysia (Gerakan) from 1980 until stepping down on 8 April 2007 to pave the way for Tan Sri Koh Tsu Koon. Just before his death, he was among the only four living Chinese Tunship holders in Malaysia.

== Background ==
Lim was born on 8 April 1939 in Tapah, Perak with fifteen siblings, to a mining father and a homemaker mother. He was educated in St. Michael's Institution in Ipoh between 1947 and 1957 before travelling to Northern Ireland in 1958. He graduated from The Queens University of Belfast with a MB.BCh.BAO. in 1964 and returned to serve in the government hospital in Taiping and a few more places before he opened up his own clinic in Chemor, a place that earned him his famous sobriquet 'sor chai yee sang' or 'madcap doctor' as he used to play the clown when treating sick children. He was a popular doctor and he used to offer free services to the poor patients.

He married Wong Yoon Chuan and the couple have three children. Former Gerakan Youth Chief, Lim Si Pin is their son.

== Political career ==
Lim began his foray into politics in 1968 by joining the Malaysian Chinese Association (MCA). He subsequently contested in the Pekan Baru state seat in Perak in 1969 on an Alliance ticket, but lost.

In 1971, he became the chairman of MCA Perak. He was appointed as a senator to Dewan Negara and joined the federal cabinet in 1972. However, in 1973, Lim was expelled from the MCA after going against the then MCA president Tun Tan Siew Sin and in the same year joined Parti Gerakan Rakyat Malaysia (Gerakan).

He became the Ulu Kinta Gerakan division head the next year and moved up to become Perak Gerakan head in 1974. In 1976, he became the party's deputy president. In July 1978, Lim resigned as senator and contested in the 1978 Perak General Elections in the Jalong state seat in Perak, which he won narrowly and was appointed as a state Exco member for two terms until 1986.

In 1980, the medical doctor-turned-politician became the Gerakan President. For the first three terms as the party head, he faced challenges and successfully defended the position at every party election since then. He contested the Beruas Parliament seat in 1986 and won by a handsome margin. He narrowly won the seat again in 1990, amid allegations of foul play, to which he has never respond. In the 2004 Malaysian general election which was also the final time he contested in a general elections before retiring, he retained his seat for a last time with a clear majority of 4,564 with a total registered voter count of 15,867.

== Cabinet position ==
Lim first became a minister in the Malaysian cabinet when he was made Minister with Special Functions dealing with New Villages and Emergency work in 1972. However, he resigned from the post the very next year as a protest against the expulsion of the MCA reform movement leaders at the time. He was then booted out of the MCA for it, where he subsequently joined Gerakan.

He made a Cabinet comeback in 1986 when he was appointed by Prime Minister Mahathir Mohamad as Minister of Primary Industries and served in the position until 2004, when he was appointed Minister of Energy, Water and Communications. During his tenure as Minister of Primary Industries, Malaysian palm oil became very well-known and was the largest palm oil producing country in the world. Up until today, palm oil is still one of Malaysia's top money earner and job creator. He will be best remembered for debating with major soybean bean producers in the United States at a time when the US banned the import of Malaysia's palm oil due to the strong lobbying from the soybean industry.

He also brought significant development to the timber industry as he worked hard and formed the Malaysian Timber Council. He also played a pivotal role in persuading Europe to import Malaysia's timber. He took the primary industries to new heights notably with the successful transformation of commodities exports to value-added products; rubber to rubber products, especially rubber dipped to furniture and cocoa to chocolates. He made unparalleled contributions in opening up the global market for Malaysian products like palm oil and timber. It was during his leadership that these commodity sectors were transformed and developed to be competitive as well as sustainable.

Tun Lim Keng Yaik switched his portfolio to the Ministry of Energy, Water and Communications in 2004. He focused on the important and urgent issues in the industry as he kept reminding the industry players to buck up and provide the services as promised to the people and be up to par, he had brought further development to the information and communication technology by ensuring better services from the telcos, the sprouting of the content industry and many more. He successfully restructured the water industry of the country.

== Retirement ==
On 2 September 2005 at the Gerakan 35th Annual National Delegates Conference dinner, Lim announced that he would be retiring as president on 8 April 2007, which was also his 68th birthday. Lim retired from his Cabinet post shortly before the 2008 general election.

He avowed to no longer comment on issues of the Party unless he was asked by the press. But he has in turn disregarded it and commented on a wide range of issues regarding the party, including the succession of the Penang Chief Minister position, and the ousting of a party member that was working under the new opposition state government. These actions have drawn the ire of many within the party that is seeing his meddling in party affairs a cause in the continual deterioration of the party's support.

Wawasan Open University (WOU) appointed Tun Lim Keng Yaik as its second chancellor on 9 May 2011 to succeed the Late Tun Lim Chong Eu.

== Death ==
After being plagued by illness for more than a year, Tun Lim Keng Yaik died peacefully on Saturday afternoon, 22 December 2012, surrounded by his family at his home in Tropicana, Petaling Jaya, he was 73. He was given a state funeral by the federal government to honour his decades of immense contributions to the country as he was one of the longest-serving ministers in the country and a highly revered statesman by the public.

== Election results ==
Perak State Legislative Assembly
| Year | Constituency | Candidate | Votes | Pct | Opponent(s) | Votes | Pct | Ballots cast | Majority | Turnout |
|---|---|---|---|---|---|---|---|---|---|---|
| 1969 | N24 Pekan Bharu | Lim Keng Yaik (MCA) | 2,688 | 17.96% | Chan Yoon Onn (PPP) | 12,281 | 82.04% | 15,617 | 9,593 | 75.18% |
| 1978 | N10 Jalong | Lim Keng Yaik (Gerakan) | | | | | | | | |
| 1982 | N10 Jalong | Lim Keng Yaik (Gerakan) | | | | | | | | |

Parliament of Malaysia
| Year | Constituency | Candidate | Votes | Pct | Opponent(s) | Votes | Pct | Ballots cast | Majority | Turnout |
|---|---|---|---|---|---|---|---|---|---|---|
| 1986 | P062 Beruas | Lim Keng Yaik (Gerakan) | 11,926 | 48.82% | Gong Ngie Hea (DAP) | 10,911 | 44.66% | 25,236 | 1,015 | 72.46% |
| 1986 | P062 Beruas | Lim Keng Yaik (Gerakan) | 11,926 | 48.82% | Hassan Mohamed (PAS) | 1,594 | 6.52% | 25,236 | 1,015 | 72.46% |
| 1990 | P062 Beruas | Lim Keng Yaik (Gerakan) | 13,889 | 51.60% | Ngeh Koo Ham (DAP) | 13,026 | 48.40% | 27,718 | 863 | 71.38% |
| 1995 | P065 Beruas | Lim Keng Yaik (Gerakan) | 18,313 | 68.46% | Chen Lim Piow (DAP) | 7,059 | 26.38% | 36,842 | 12,318 | 73.71% |
| 1995 | P065 Beruas | Lim Keng Yaik (Gerakan) | 18,313 | 68.46% | Ramli Ariffin (IND) | 708 | 2.65% | 36,842 | 12,318 | 73.71% |
| 1995 | P065 Beruas | Lim Keng Yaik (Gerakan) | 18,313 | 68.46% | Tan Kiat Seng (IND) | 671 | 2.51% | 36,842 | 12,318 | 73.71% |
| 1999 | P065 Beruas | Lim Keng Yaik (Gerakan) | 14,256 | 51.81% | Yew Teong Chong (DAP) | 12,801 | 46.53% | 28,297 | 1,455 | 64.02% |
| 1999 | P065 Beruas | Lim Keng Yaik (Gerakan) | 14,256 | 51.81% | Abdul Roni (MDP) | 457 | 1.66% | 28,297 | 1,455 | 64.02% |
| 2004 | P068 Beruas | Lim Keng Yaik (Gerakan) | 15,867 | 58.40% | Nga Hock Cheh (DAP) | 11,303 | 41.60% | 28,328 | 4,564 | 67.17% |

== Honours ==
=== Honours of Malaysia ===
- Malaysia
  - Grand Commander of the Order of Loyalty to the Crown of Malaysia (SSM) – Tun (2008)
- Pahang
  - Knight Grand Companion of the Order of Sultan Ahmad Shah of Pahang (SSAP) – Dato' Sri (2005)
- Perak
  - Knight Grand Commander of the Order of the Perak State Crown (SPMP) – Dato' Seri (1989)
  - Knight Commander of the Order of Cura Si Manja Kini (DPCM) – Dato' (1981)
  - Commander of the Order of Cura Si Manja Kini (PCM) (1976)
- Penang
  - Commander of the Order of the Defender of State (DGPN) – Dato' Seri (1997)
- Sarawak
  - Knight Commander of the Most Exalted Order of the Star of Sarawak (PNBS) – Dato Sri (2008)

Political offices
| Preceded by Lim Chong Eu | President of Parti Gerakan Rakyat Malaysia (Gerakan); 1980 – 8 April 2007 | Succeeded by Koh Tsu Koon |
