= 1966 Bruas by-election =

- 4 June 1966

P044 seat in the Dewan Rakyat
- Turnout: 19,611
	First party	Second party	Third party
	All	PPP	PMIP
Candidate	Chew Biow Chuon	Wong Kok Wek	Abdul Rahim Salleh
Party	MCA	PPP	PMIP
Alliance	Alliance
Popular vote	9,464	6,426	3,357
Percentage	49.17%	33.39%	17.44%
MP before election
Yeoh Tat Beng
Alliance (MCA)
Elected MP
Chew Biow Chuon
Alliance (MCA)

The Bruas by-election is a parliamentary by-election that was held on 4 June 1966 in the state of Perak, Malaysia. The Bruas seat fell vacant following the death of its member of parliament Mr. Yeoh Tat Beng of Alliance who was killed by road accident. He won the seat in 1959 Malayan general election as an independent before cross the floor to Alliance. He defended the seat as Alliance candidate in 1964 Malaysian general election with 3,868 majority.

Chew Biow Chuon of Alliance, won the by election, defeating Wong Kok Wek of PPP and Abdul Rahim Salleh of PMIP with a majority of 3,038 votes. The constituency had 27,014 voters.

== Nomination ==
Alliance nominated businessman, Chew Biow Chuon. PPP nominated clerk, Wong Kok Wek while PMIP nominated self-employed Abdul Rahim Salleh.

== Results ==
Malaysian general by-election, 4 June 1966: Bruas Upon the death of incumbent, Yeoh Tat Beng
Party	Candidate	Votes	%	∆%
Alliance	Chew Biow Chuon	9,464	49.17	▼4.15
PPP	Wong Kok Weng	6,426	33.39	▲33.39
PMIP	Abdul Rahim Mat Salleh	3,357	17.44	▲17.44
Total valid votes		19,247	100.00	
Total rejected ballots		364		
Unreturned ballots		0		
Turnout		19,611	72.60	▲6.80
Registered electors		27,014		
Majority		3,038	16.31	▼3.17
Alliance hold		Swing		

== Legacy ==
The by-election marks the end for Malaysian Solidarity Convention due to United Democratic Party decision to not endorse PPP candidate.
