= Kamunting (state constituency) =

Political subdivision in Malaysia

Kamaunting (N16)
Perak constituency

State constituency
- Legislature: Perak State Legislative Assembly
MLA
Mohd Fakhrudin Abdul Aziz
PN
- Constituency created: 1974
- First contested: 1974
- Last contested: 2022

Demographics
- Electors (2022): 39,850

Kamunting is a state constituency in Perak, Malaysia, that has been represented in the Perak State Legislative Assembly.

== Demographics ==
Ethnic breakdown of Kamunting's electorate as of 2022
1. Malay (67.0%)
2. Chinese (17.7%)
3. Indian (13.3%)
4. Other ethnicities (2.00%)

== History ==
=== Polling districts ===
According to the federal gazette issued on 31 October 2022, the Kamunting constituency is divided into 10 polling districts.

State constituency	Polling Districts	Code	Location
Kamunting (N16）	Sungai Relong	060/16/01	SMK Bukit Jana
Kamunting (N16）	Expo	060/16/02	SMK Kamunitng
Kamunting (N16）	Kamunting Baru	060/16/03	SK Kamunting
Kamunting (N16）	Kamunting	060/16/04	SJK (C) Phui Choi
Kamunting (N16）	Kampong Pinang Utara	060/16/05	SA Bantuan Kerajaan Maahad Al-Khair Lil Banat
Kamunting (N16）	Kampong Pinang Timor	060/16/06	SK Long Jaafar
Kamunting (N16）	Kampong Pinang Selatan	060/16/07	SK Long Jaafar
Kamunting (N16）	Kamunting Road	060/16/08	SK All Saints
Kamunting (N16）	Bukit Jana	060/16/09	SK Taman Jana; SRA Rakyat Nurul Nizomiyyah
Kamunting (N16）	Waterfall Road	060/16/10	SK King Edward VII (2)

=== Representation history ===
Members of the Perak State Assembly for Kamunting
Assembly	No	Years	Member	Party
Constituency created from Larut and Matang
4th	N11	1974 – 1978	Cheong Kim Foong (張錦鴻)	BN (MCA)
5th	N11	1978 – 1982	Ahmad Nawi	BN (UMNO)
6th	N11	1982 – 1986	Abdul Khalid Mohamed Nasir	BN (UMNO)
7th	N11	1986 – 1990	Zulkifli Hussein	BN (UMNO)
8th	N11	1990 – 1995	Zulkifli Hussein	BN (UMNO)
9th	N13	1995 – 1999	Abdul Malek Mohamed Hanafiah	BN (UMNO)
10th	N13	1999 – 2004	Abdul Malek Mohamed Hanafiah	BN (UMNO)
11th	N16	2004 – 2008	Abdul Malek Mohamed Hanafiah	BN (UMNO)
12th	N16	2008 – 2013	Mohamad Zahir Abdul Khalid	BN (UMNO)
13th	N16	2013 – 2018	Mohamad Zahir Abdul Khalid	BN (UMNO)
14th	N16	2018 – 2022	Muhd Fadhil Nuruddin	PH (AMANAH)
15th	N16	2022–present	Mohd Fakhrudin Abdul Aziz	PN (PAS)

== Election results ==
Perak state election, 2022
Party	Candidate	Votes	%	∆%
PN	Mohd Fakhrudin Abdul Aziz	13,045	43.98	▲43.98
PH	Muhd Fadhil Nuruddin	9,945	33.53	▲33.53
BN	Ahmad Shalimin Ahmad Shaffie	6,674	22.50	▼12.45
Total valid votes		30,042	100.00	
Total rejected ballots		292		
Unreturned ballots		86		
Turnout		30,420	75.39	▼4.54
Registered electors		39,850		
Majority		3,100	10.45	▲2.90
PN gain from PKR		Swing		?

Perak state election, 2018
Party	Candidate	Votes	%	∆%
PKR	Muhd Fadhil Nuruddin	9,898	42.50	▲42.50
BN	Mohamad Zahir Abdul Khalid	8,118	34.95	▼17.01
PAS	Mohd Fakhrudin Abdul Aziz	5,276	22.65	▼25.39
Total valid votes		23,292	97.13	
Total rejected ballots		471	1.96	
Unreturned ballots		217	0.90	
Turnout		23,980	79.93	▼4.17
Registered electors		30,000		
Majority		1,780	7.55	▲3.63
PKR gain from BN		Swing		?
Source(s) "RESULTS OF CONTESTED ELECTION AND STATEMENTS OF THE POLL AFTER THE OFFICIAL ADDITION OF VOTES".

Perak state election, 2013
Party	Candidate	Votes	%	∆%
BN	Mohamad Zahir Abdul Khalid	11,784	51.96	▲0.16
PAS	Mohd Fakhrudin Abdul Aziz	10,897	48.04	▼0.16
Total valid votes		22,681	98.62	
Total rejected ballots		212	0.92	
Unreturned ballots		106	0.46	
Turnout		22,999	84.10	▲9.46
Registered electors		27,348		
Majority		887	3.92	▲0.32
BN hold		Swing		
Source(s) "KEPUTUSAN PILIHAN RAYA UMUM DEWAN UNDANGAN NEGERI". Archived from the original on 2013-06-08.

Perak state election, 2008
Party	Candidate	Votes	%	∆%
BN	Mohamad Zahir Abdul Khalid	7,975	51.80	▼13.53
PAS	Muhamad Apardi Shaari	7,420	48.20	▲13.53
Total valid votes		15,395	95.15	
Total rejected ballots		358	2.21	
Unreturned ballots		426	2.63	
Turnout		16,179	74.64	▲2.17
Registered electors		21,675		
Majority		555	3.60	▼28.51
BN hold		Swing		
Source(s) "KEPUTUSAN PILIHAN RAYA UMUM DEWAN UNDANGAN NEGERI PERAK BAGI TAHUN 2008".

Perak state election, 2004
Party	Candidate	Votes	%	∆%
BN	Abdul Malek Mohamed Hanafiah	9,184	65.33	▲6.44
PAS	Mohamed Ghazali Tain	4,613	32.82	▼8.29
Independent	Simon Uthaya Kumar A/L Sellaiyah	259	1.84	▲1.84
Total valid votes		14,056	95.17	
Total rejected ballots		295	2.00	
Unreturned ballots		419	2.84	
Turnout		14,770	72.47	▼0.41
Registered electors		20,382		
Majority		4,571	32.51	▲14.73
BN hold		Swing		
Source(s) "KEPUTUSAN PILIHAN RAYA UMUM DEWAN UNDANGAN NEGERI PERAK BAGI TAHUN 2004".

Perak state election, 1999
Party	Candidate	Votes	%	∆%
BN	Abdul Malek Mohamed Hanafiah	7,303	58.89	▼20.39
PAS	Kamarudin Ahmad	5,098	41.11	▲20.39
Total valid votes		12,401	91.50	
Total rejected ballots		252	1.86	
Unreturned ballots		900	6.64	
Turnout		13,553	72.88	▲2.63
Registered electors		18,597		
Majority		2,205	17.78	▼40.78
BN hold		Swing		
Source(s) "KEPUTUSAN PILIHAN RAYA UMUM DEWAN UNDANGAN NEGERI PERAK BAGI TAHUN 1999".

Perak state election, 1995
Party	Candidate	Votes	%	∆%
BN	Abdul Malek Mohamed Hanafiah	9,155	79.28	▲12.39
PAS	Ahmad Tajuddin Mat Jali	2,393	20.72	▼12.39
Total valid votes		11,548	97.88	
Total rejected ballots		250	2.12	
Unreturned ballots		0	0	
Turnout		11,798	70.25	▼2.18
Registered electors		16,795		
Majority		6,762	58.56	▲24.78
BN hold		Swing		
Source(s) "KEPUTUSAN PILIHAN RAYA UMUM DEWAN UNDANGAN NEGERI PERAK BAGI TAHUN 1995".

Perak state election, 1990
Party	Candidate	Votes	%	∆%
BN	Zulkifli Hussein	14,028	66.89	▼10.35
PAS	Khalid Nasir	6,945	33.11	▲10.35
Total valid votes		20,973	98.06	
Total rejected ballots		415	1.94	
Unreturned ballots		0	0	
Turnout		21,388	72.43	▲9.35
Registered electors		29,531		
Majority		7,083	33.78	▼20.70
BN hold		Swing		
Source(s) "KEPUTUSAN PILIHAN RAYA UMUM DEWAN UNDANGAN NEGERI PERAK BAGI TAHUN 1990".

Perak state election, 1986
Party	Candidate	Votes	%	∆%
BN	Zulkifli Hussein	10,739	77.24	▲10.67
PAS	Johari Habib	3,164	22.76	▲11.43
Total valid votes		13,903	100.00	
Total rejected ballots		594		
Unreturned ballots		0		
Turnout		14,497	63.08	▼10.42
Registered electors		22,983		
Majority		7,575	54.48	▲10.01
BN hold		Swing		
Source(s) "KEPUTUSAN PILIHAN RAYA UMUM DEWAN UNDANGAN NEGERI PERAK BAGI TAHUN 1986".

Perak state election, 1982
Party	Candidate	Votes	%	∆%
BN	Abdul Khalid Mohd. Nasir	9,248	66.57	▲9.31
DAP	Clement Eustace De Brito	3,070	22.10	▼5.85
PAS	Safari Abdullah	1,574	11.33	▼3.47
Total valid votes		13,892	100.00	
Total rejected ballots		300		
Unreturned ballots		0		
Turnout		14,192	73.50	▲2.65
Registered electors		19,310		
Majority		6,178	44.47	▲15.16
BN hold		Swing		

Perak state election, 1978
Party	Candidate	Votes	%	∆%
BN	Ahmad bin Nawi	6,370	57.26	▲57.26
DAP	Zainal Abidin bin Ahmad	3,109	27.95	▲0.84
PAS	Salahudin Awang Ismail	1,646	14.80	▲14.80
Total valid votes		11,125	100.00	
Total rejected ballots		461		
Unreturned ballots		0		
Turnout		11,586	70.84	▼3.01
Registered electors		16,355		
Majority		3,261	29.31	▼10.14
BN hold		Swing		

Perak state election, 1974
Party	Candidate	Votes	%
BN	Cheong Kim Foong	5,868	66.56
DAP	Che Rose Abdullah	2,390	27.11
PEKEMAS	Choe Soe Leng	331	3.75
Independent	Harun Musa	227	2.57
Total valid votes		8,816	100.00
Total rejected ballots		596	
Unreturned ballots		0	
Turnout		9,412	73.85
Registered electors		12,745	
Majority		3,478	39.45
This was a new constituency created.
