= Mohd Akmal Kamaruddin =

Malaysian politician

Yang Berhormat Tuan Mohd Akmal Kamaruddin MLA
- محمد أكمل بن قمرالدين

Member of the Perak State Executive Council
- In office 15 December 2020 – 21 November 2022
- Monarch: Nazrin Shah
- Menteri Besar: Saarani Mohamad
- Portfolio: Health, Science, Environment and Green Technology
- Preceded by: Ahmad Saidi Mohamad Daud
- Succeeded by: Sivanesan Achalingam (Health); Teh Kok Lim (Science, Environment and Green Technology)
- Constituency: Selama
- In office 31 March 2020 – 5 December 2020
- Monarch: Nazrin Shah
- Menteri Besar: Ahmad Faizal Azumu
- Portfolio: Islamic Religious and Information
- Preceded by: Asmuni Awi (Islamic Religious); Abdul Aziz Bari (Information)
- Succeeded by: Saarani Mohamad (Islamic Religion); Portfolio abolished (Information)
- Constituency: Selama

Member of the Perak State Legislative Assembly for Selama
- Incumbent
- Assumed office 9 May 2018
- Preceded by: Mohamad Daud Mohd Yusoff (BN–UMNO)
- Majority: 289 (2018); 5,358 (2022)

Faction represented in Perak State Legislative Assembly
- 2018–2020: Malaysian Islamic Party
- 2020–: Perikatan Nasional

Personal details
- Born: Mohd Akmal bin Kamaruddin Perak, Malaysia
- Citizenship: Malaysian
- Party: Malaysian Islamic Party (PAS)
- Other political affiliations: Perikatan Nasional (PN)
- Relations: Abdul Hadi Awang (father-in-law)
- Occupation: Politician

Mohd Akmal bin Kamaruddin is a Malaysian politician who has served as Member of the Perak State Legislative Assembly (MLA) for Selama since May 2018. He served as Member of the Perak State Executive Council (EXCO) for the second term in the Barisan Nasional (BN) state administration under Menteri Besar Saarani Mohamad from December 2020 to November 2022 and the first term in the Perikatan Nasional (PN) state administration under former Menteri Besar Ahmad Faizal Azumu from March to the collapse of the PN state administration in December 2020. He is a member of the Malaysian Islamic Party (PAS), a component party of the Perikatan Nasional (PN) coalition. He is also the son-in-law of Abdul Hadi Awang, the President of PAS and Member of Parliament (MP) for Marang.

== Election results ==
Perak State Legislative Assembly
Year	Constituency	Candidate	Votes	Pct	Opponent(s)	Votes	Pct	Ballots cast	Majority	Turnout
2013	N05 Selama	Mohd Akmal Kamaruddin (PAS)	6,235	47.64%	Mohamad Daud Mohd Yusoff (UMNO)	6,854	52.36%	16,826	619	82.00%
2018	N05 Selama	Mohd Akmal Kamaruddin (PAS)	5,516	41.28%	Faizul Arby Mohd Shohor (UMNO)	5,227	39.12%	13,653	289	82.80%
2018	N05 Selama	Mohd Akmal Kamaruddin (PAS)	5,516	41.28%	Razali Ismail (AMANAH)	2,618	19.60%	13,653	289	82.80%
2022	N05 Selama	Mohd Akmal Kamaruddin (PAS)	10,358	58.32%	Faizul Rizal (UMNO)	5,000	28.15%	17,762	5,358	79.51%
2022	N05 Selama	Mohd Akmal Kamaruddin (PAS)	10,358	58.32%	Razali Ismail (AMANAH)	2,343	13.19%	17,762	5,358	79.51%
2022	N05 Selama	Mohd Akmal Kamaruddin (PAS)	10,358	58.32%	Osman Sidek (IND)	61	0.34%	17,762	5,358	79.51%
