= Lim Si Pin =

Malaysian politician

Yang Berbahagia Datuk Lim Si Pin PMW
- 林時彬

Personal details
- Born: Lim Si Pin; 1969 (age 56–57) Malaysia
- Citizenship: Malaysian
- Party: Parti Gerakan Rakyat Malaysia (Gerakan)
- Other political affiliations: Barisan Nasional (BN)
- Relations: Son of Tun Lim Keng Yaik

Lim Si Pin (simplified Chinese: 林时彬; traditional Chinese: 林時彬; pinyin: Lín Shíbīn; Pe̍h-ōe-jī: Lîm Sî-pin) is a Malaysian politician. He ever served as the head of the youth wing of Parti Gerakan Rakyat Malaysia (Gerakan), a component party of Barisan Nasional (BN) coalition; from 2008 to 2011.

Lim is the son of Lim Keng Yaik, a former cabinet minister and president of Gerakan.

He contested the Malaysian General Election 2008 for the Barisan Nasional held parliamentary seat of Batu, Kuala Lumpur, but was defeated by Tian Chua of the opposition People's Justice Party (PKR).

== Election results ==
Parliament of Malaysia
Year	Constituency	Candidate	Votes	Pct	Opponent(s)	Votes	Pct	Ballots cast	Majority	Turnout
2008	P115 Batu	Lim Si Pin (Gerakan)	20,330	40.11%	Chua Tian Chang (PKR)	29,785	58.76%	51,303	9,455	72.72%

== Honours ==
- Federal Territory (Malaysia)
  - Commander of the Order of the Territorial Crown (PMW) – Datuk (2012)
