= Beruas (federal constituency) =

Federal constituency in Perak, Malaysia

Beruas (P068)
Perak constituency

Federal constituency
- Legislature: Dewan Rakyat
- MP: Ngeh Koo Ham; PH
- Constituency created: 1958
- First contested: 1959
- Last contested: 2022

Demographics
- Population (2020): 119,756
- Electors (2022): 108,249
- Area (km²): 754
- Pop. density (per km²): 158.8

Beruas is a federal constituency in Manjung District, Perak, Malaysia, that has been represented in the Dewan Rakyat since 1959.

The federal constituency was created in the 1958 redistribution and is mandated to return a single member to the Dewan Rakyat under the first past the post voting system.

== Demographics ==
Ethnic breakdown of Beruas's electorate as of 2022
1. Chinese (56.8%)
2. Malay (27.2%)
3. Indian (15.2%)
4. Other ethnicities (0.90%)

As of 2020, Beruas has a population of 119,756 people.

Age breakdown of Beruas's electorate as of 2022
1. 18–20 (5.46%)
2. 21–29 (18.9%)
3. 30–39 (20.7%)
4. 40–49 (17.7%)
5. 50–59 (15.1%)
6. 60–69 (12.3%)
7. 70–79 (6.94%)
8. 80–89 (2.42%)
9. above 90 (0.53%)
Gender breakdown of Beruas's electorate as of 2022
1. Male (50.3%)
2. Female (49.7%)

== History ==
=== Polling districts ===
According to the federal gazette issued on 31 October 2022, the Beruas constituency is divided into 46 polling districts.

State constituency	Polling Districts	Code	Location
Pengkalan Baharu (N36)	Kampong Pintu Gerbang	068/36/01	Dewan Orang Ramai Pintu Gerbang
Pengkalan Baharu (N36)	Dendang	068/36/02	SK Dendang
Pengkalan Baharu (N36)	Paya Ara	068/36/03	SK Dendang
Pengkalan Baharu (N36)	Bruas	068/36/04	SK Beruas
Pengkalan Baharu (N36)	Bruas Timor	068/36/05	SK Bruas
Pengkalan Baharu (N36)	Bruas Barat	068/36/06	SK Bruas
Pengkalan Baharu (N36)	Ladang Bruas	068/36/07	SJK (T) Beruas
Pengkalan Baharu (N36)	Ulu Bruas	068/36/08	SJK (T) Beruas
Pengkalan Baharu (N36)	Panchor	068/36/09	SK Panchor
Pengkalan Baharu (N36)	Pengkalan Baharu	068/36/10	SK Pengkalan Baharu
Pengkalan Baharu (N36)	Kampong Baharu Sungai Batu	068/36/11	SJK (C) Sungai Batu
Pengkalan Baharu (N36)	Ladang Huntly	068/36/12	SK Ladang Huntly
Pengkalan Baharu (N36)	Kampong Kota	068/36/13	SK Kampong Kota
Pengkalan Baharu (N36)	Kampong Tengah	068/36/14	SK Gelong Gajah
Pengkalan Baharu (N36)	Gelong Gajah	068/36/15	SK Gelong Gajah
Pengkalan Baharu (N36)	Kampong Banjar	068/36/16	Dewan Orang Ramai Kampong Banjar
Pengkalan Baharu (N36)	Kampong Jering New Village	068/36/17	SJK (C) Kampung Jering
Pengkalan Baharu (N36)	Jalan Ayer Tawar	068/36/18	SK Ayer Tawar
Pengkalan Baharu (N36)	Changkat Chermin	068/36/19	SK Changkat Chermin
Pengkalan Baharu (N36)	Paya Nibong	068/36/20	Dewan Orang Ramai Paya Nibong
Pantai Remis (N37)	Pantai Remis	068/37/01	SK Pantai Remis
Pantai Remis (N37)	Taman Bintang	068/37/02	SM Yik Ching
Pantai Remis (N37)	Kampong Indah	068/37/03	SMK Pantai Remis
Pantai Remis (N37)	Kampong Sungai Batu	068/37/04	SK Sungai Batu
Pantai Remis (N37)	Ladang Segari	068/37/05	SK Segari
Pantai Remis (N37)	Segari	068/37/06	SJK (C) Pei Min
Pantai Remis (N37)	Changkat Keruing	068/37/07	SJK (C) Khuen Hean
Pantai Remis (N37)	Ladang Cashwood	068/37/08	SJK (T) Kampong Tun Sambanthan
Pantai Remis (N37)	Kampong Merbau	068/37/09	SJK (C) Kampong Merbau
Pantai Remis (N37)	Kampong Raja Hitam	068/37/10	SJK (C) Pei Min
Pantai Remis (N37)	Bunga Raya	068/37/11	SK Methodist
Pantai Remis (N37)	Taman Sri Ayer Tawar	068/37/12	SJK (C) Min Te
Pantai Remis (N37)	Ayer Tawar Baharu	068/37/13	SMJK Ayer Tawar
Pantai Remis (N37)	Taman Dinding	068/37/14	SMK Ambrose; SJK (T) Ayer Tawar
Pantai Remis (N37)	Ayer Tawar Selatan	068/37/15	SMK Methodist
Pantai Remis (N37)	Ayer Tawar Tengah	068/37/16	SMK Methodist
Astaka (N38)	Simpang Lima	068/38/01	SJK (C) Simpang Lima
Astaka (N38)	Pekan Gurney	068/38/02	SJK (C) Pekan Gurney
Astaka (N38)	Simpang Dua	068/38/03	SJK (C) Chien Hua
Astaka (N38)	Astaka	068/38/04	SMK Tok Perdana
Astaka (N38)	Sitiawan	068/38/05	SK Seri Selamat
Astaka (N38)	Taman Pegawai	068/38/06	SK St. Francis
Astaka (N38)	Kampong China Utara	068/38/07	SJK (C) Uk Ing
Astaka (N38)	Kampong China Selatan	068/38/08	SJK (C) Chinese National
Astaka (N38)	Kampong Koh Utara	068/38/09	SMJK Nan Hwa; SMK Methodist (ACS)
Astaka (N38)	Kampong Koh Selatan	068/38/10	SJK (C) Uk Dih; SK Methodist (ACS)

=== Representation history ===
Members of Parliament for Beruas
Parliament	No	Years	Member	Party	Vote Share
Constituency created from Dindings
Bruas
Parliament of the Federation of Malaya
1st	P044	1959–1963	Yeoh Tat Beng (杨达明)	Independent	5,967; 38.78%
Parliament of Malaysia
1st	P044	1963–1964	Yeoh Tat Beng (杨达明)	Independent	5,967; 38.78%
2nd	P044	1964–1966	Yeoh Tat Beng (杨达明)	Alliance (MCA)	10,587; 53.32%
2nd	P044	1966–1969	Chew Biow Chuon (周苗存)	Alliance (MCA)	9,464; 40.17%
		1969–1971	Parliament was suspended		
3rd	P044	1971–1973	Su Liang Yu (苏良佑)	PPP	8,368; 41.22%
3rd	P044	1973–1974	Su Liang Yu (苏良佑)	BN (PPP)	8,368; 41.22%
4th	P056	1974–1978	Su Liang Yu (苏良佑)	BN (PPP)	6,560; 42.95%
5th	P056	1978–1982	Ting Chek Ming (陈则明)	DAP	9,611; 46.89%
6th	P056	1982–1986	Michael Chen Wing Sum (曾永森)	BN (GERAKAN)	14,922; 63.08%
Beruas
7th	P062	1986–1990	Lim Keng Yaik (林敬益)	BN (GERAKAN)	11,926; 49.82%
8th	P062	1990–1995	Lim Keng Yaik (林敬益)	BN (GERAKAN)	13,889; 51.60%
9th	P065	1995–1999	Lim Keng Yaik (林敬益)	BN (GERAKAN)	18,313; 68.46%
10th	P065	1999–2004	Lim Keng Yaik (林敬益)	BN (GERAKAN)	14,256; 51.81%
11th	P068	2004–2008	Lim Keng Yaik (林敬益)	BN (GERAKAN)	15,867; 58.40%
12th	P068	2008–2013	Ngeh Koo Ham (倪可汉)	PR (DAP)	15,831; 53.06%
13th	P068	2013–2015	Ngeh Koo Ham (倪可汉)	PR (DAP)	21,939; 56.51%
13th	P068	2015–2018	Ngeh Koo Ham (倪可汉)	PH (DAP)	21,939; 56.51%
14th	P068	2018–2022	Ngeh Koo Ham (倪可汉)	PH (DAP)	41,231; 68.41%
15th	P068	2022–present	Ngeh Koo Ham (倪可汉)	PH (DAP)	46,710; 64.72%

=== State constituency ===
Parliamentary constituency	State constituency						
Parliamentary constituency	1955–1959*	1959–1974	1974–1986	1986–1995	1995–2004	2004–2018	2018–present
Beruas							Astaka
Beruas				Pantai Remis			
Beruas				Pengkalan Baharu			
Bruas		Ayer Tawar					
Bruas			Pantai Remis				
Bruas		Pengkalan Baharu					

=== Historical boundaries ===
State Constituency	Area					
State Constituency	1959	1974	1984	1994	2003	2018
Astaka						FELCRA Lekir; Kampung Koh; Pekan Gurney; Simpang Dua; Sitiawan
Ayer Tawar	Ayer Tawar; Kampung Muihibbah; Kampung Raja Hitam; Pantai Remis; Segari					
Pantai Remis		Ayer Tawar; Changkat Keruing; Segari; Kampung Merbau; Simpang Lima	Ayer Tawar; Changkat Keruing; Segari; Kampung Merbau; Pantai Remis			
Pengkalan Baharu	Beruas; Kampung Panchor; Kampung Sungai Nyior; Kuala Trong; Pengkalan Baharu	Beruas; Kampung Panchor; Kampung Jering; Pantai Remis; Pengkalan Baharu	Beruas; Kampung Panchor; Kampung Jering; Kampung Tualang; Pengkalan Baharu			

=== Current state assembly members ===
No.	State Constituency	Member	Coalition (Party)
N36	Pengkalan Baharu	Azman Noh	BN (UMNO)
N37	Pantai Remis	Wong May Ing	PH (DAP)
N38	Astaka	Jason Ng Thien Yeong	PH (DAP)

=== Local governments & postcodes ===
No.	State Constituency	Local Government	Postcode
N36	Pengkalan Baharu	Manjung Municipal Council	32000 Sitiawan; 32040 Seri Manjong; 32200 Lumut; 32400 Ayer Tawar; 32500 Changkat Keruing; 32700 Beruas; 34900 Pantai Remis
N37	Pantai Remis	Manjung Municipal Council	32000 Sitiawan; 32040 Seri Manjong; 32200 Lumut; 32400 Ayer Tawar; 32500 Changkat Keruing; 32700 Beruas; 34900 Pantai Remis
N38	Astaka	Manjung Municipal Council	32000 Sitiawan; 32040 Seri Manjong; 32200 Lumut; 32400 Ayer Tawar; 32500 Changkat Keruing; 32700 Beruas; 34900 Pantai Remis

== Election results ==
Malaysian general election, 2022
Party	Candidate	Votes	%	∆%
PH	Ngeh Koo Ham	46,710	64.72	▲64.72
PN	Ong Kean Sing	12,739	17.65	▲17.65
BN	Ding Siew Chee	12,724	17.63	▼4.40
Total valid votes		72,173	100.00	
Total rejected ballots		1,124		
Unreturned ballots		186		
Turnout		73,483	66.17	▼11.05
Registered electors		108,249		
Majority		33,971	47.07	▲0.69
PH hold		Swing		
Source(s) https://lom.agc.gov.my/ilims/upload/portal/akta/outputp/1753277/PUB610%20PARLIMEN%20PERAK.pdf

Malaysian general election, 2018
Party	Candidate	Votes	%	∆%
PKR	Ngeh Koo Ham	41,231	68.41	▲68.41
BN	Pang Chok King	13,277	22.03	▼21.46
PAS	Mohamad Nazeer M K M Hameed	5,759	9.56	▲9.56
Total valid votes		60,267	100.00	
Total rejected ballots		1,009		
Unreturned ballots		341		
Turnout		61,617	77.22	▼3.23
Registered electors		79,794		
Majority		27,954	46.38	▲33.36
PKR hold		Swing		
Source(s) "His Majesty's Government Gazette - Notice of Contested Election, Parliament for the State of Perak [P.U. (B) 237/2018]" (PDF). Attorney General's Chambers of Malaysia. 3 May 2018. "Federal Government Gazette - Results of Contested Election and Statements of the Poll after the Official Addition of Votes, Parliamentary Constituencies for the State of Perak [P.U. (B) 311/2018]" (PDF). Attorney General's Chambers of Malaysia. 28 May 2018.

Malaysian general election, 2013
Party	Candidate	Votes	%	∆%
DAP	Ngeh Koo Ham	21,939	56.51	▲3.45
BN	Chang Ko Youn	16,882	43.49	▼3.45
Total valid votes		38,821	100.00	
Total rejected ballots		687		
Unreturned ballots		78		
Turnout		39,586	80.45	▲9.23
Registered electors		49,205		
Majority		5,057	13.02	▲6.90
DAP hold		Swing		
Source(s) "Federal Government Gazette - Notice of Contested Election, Parliament for the State of Perak [P.U. (B) 174/2013]" (PDF). Attorney General's Chambers of Malaysia. 26 April 2013. Archived from the original (PDF) on 29 December 2019. "Federal Government Gazette - Results of Contested Election and Statements of the Poll after the Official Addition of Votes, Parliamentary Constituencies for the State of Perak [P.U. (B) 215/2013]" (PDF). Attorney General's Chambers of Malaysia. 22 May 2013.

Malaysian general election, 2008
Party	Candidate	Votes	%	∆%
DAP	Ngeh Koo Ham	15,831	53.06	▲11.46
BN	Chang Ko Youn	14,003	46.94	▼11.46
Total valid votes		29,834	100.00	
Total rejected ballots		889		
Unreturned ballots		98		
Turnout		30,821	71.22	▲4.05
Registered electors		43,273		
Majority		1,828	6.12	▼10.68
DAP gain from BN		Swing		?

Malaysian general election, 2004
Party	Candidate	Votes	%	∆%
BN	Lim Keng Yaik @ Lim Kheng Heang	15,867	58.40	▲6.59
DAP	Nga Hock Cheh	11,303	41.60	▼4.93
Total valid votes		27,170	100.00	
Total rejected ballots		1,102		
Unreturned ballots		56		
Turnout		28,328	67.17	▲3.15
Registered electors		42,173		
Majority		4,564	16.80	▲11.52
BN hold		Swing		

Malaysian general election, 1999
Party	Candidate	Votes	%	∆%
BN	Lim Keng Yaik @ Lim Kheng Heang	14,256	51.81	▼16.65
DAP	Yew Teong Chong	12,801	46.53	▲20.15
MDP	Abdul Roni	457	1.66	▲1.66
Total valid votes		27,514	100.00	
Total rejected ballots		782		
Unreturned ballots		1		
Turnout		28,297	64.02	▼2.54
Registered electors		44,200		
Majority		1,455	5.28	▼36.80
BN hold		Swing		

Malaysian general election, 1995
Party	Candidate	Votes	%	∆%
BN	Lim Keng Yaik @ Lim Kheng Heang	18,313	68.46	▲16.86
DAP	Chen Lim Piow	7,059	26.38	▼22.02
Independent	Ramli Ariffin	708	2.65	▲2.65
Independent	Tan Kiat Seng @ Shuk Yik	671	2.51	▲2.51
Total valid votes		26,751	100.00	
Total rejected ballots		1,050		
Unreturned ballots		58		
Turnout		27,859	66.56	▼4.82
Registered electors		41,855		
Majority		11,254	42.08	▲38.88
BN hold		Swing		

Malaysian general election, 1990
Party	Candidate	Votes	%	∆%
BN	Lim Keng Yaik @ Lim Kheng Heang	13,889	51.60	▲2.78
DAP	Ngeh Koo Ham	13,026	48.40	▲3.74
Total valid votes		26,915	100.00	
Total rejected ballots		803		
Unreturned ballots		0		
Turnout		27,718	71.38	▼1.08
Registered electors		38,832		
Majority		863	3.20	▼0.96
BN hold		Swing		

Malaysian general election, 1986
Party	Candidate	Votes	%	∆%
BN	Lim Keng Yaik @ Lim Kheng Heang	11,926	48.82	▼14.26
DAP	Gong Ngie Hea	10,911	44.66	▲13.00
PAS	Hassan Mohamed	1,594	6.52	▲1.26
Total valid votes		24,431	100.00	
Total rejected ballots		805		
Unreturned ballots		0		
Turnout		25,236	72.46	▼4.62
Registered electors		34,828		
Majority		1,015	4.16	▼27.36
BN hold		Swing		

Malaysian general election, 1982: Bruas
Party	Candidate	Votes	%	∆%
BN	Michael Chen Wing Sum	14,922	63.08	▲18.18
DAP	Quek Kow Sia	7,490	31.66	▼15.23
PAS	Yusoff Kassim	1,244	5.26	▼2.95
Total valid votes		23,656	100.00	
Total rejected ballots		540		
Unreturned ballots		0		
Turnout		24,196	77.08	▼1.86
Registered electors		31,391		
Majority		7,432	31.42	▲29.43
BN gain from DAP		Swing		?

Malaysian general election, 1978: Bruas
Party	Candidate	Votes	%	∆%
DAP	Ting Chek Ming	9,611	46.89	▲9.20
BN	Su Liang Yu	9,204	44.90	▲1.95
PAS	Zulkifflie Alias	1,683	8.21	▲8.21
Total valid votes		20,498	100.00	
Total rejected ballots		903		
Unreturned ballots		0		
Turnout		21,401	78.94	▲10.17
Registered electors		27,109		
Majority		407	1.99	▼3.27
DAP gain from BN		Swing		?

Malaysian general election, 1974: Bruas
Party	Candidate	Votes	%	∆%
BN	Su Liang Yu	6,560	42.95	▲42.95
DAP	Daing Ibrahim Othman	5,757	37.69	▲37.69
Independent	Oh Ka Seng	1,753	11.48	▲11.48
PEKEMAS	Teoh Hoi Sim	1,204	7.88	▲7.88
Total valid votes		15,274	100.00	
Total rejected ballots		918		
Unreturned ballots		0		
Turnout		16,192	68.77	▼3.64
Registered electors		23,544		
Majority		803	5.26	▲2.95
BN gain from PPP		Swing		?

Malaysian general election, 1969: Bruas
Party	Candidate	Votes	%	∆%
PPP	Su Liang Yu	8,368	41.22	▲7.83
Alliance	Chew Biow Chuon	7,900	38.91	▲10.26
PMIP	Mohd Rus Jaafar	4,033	19.87	▲2.43
Total valid votes		20,301	100.00	
Total rejected ballots		1,002		
Unreturned ballots				
Turnout		21,303	72.41	▼0.19
Registered electors		29,421		
Majority		468	2.31	▼14.00
PPP gain from Alliance		Swing		?

Malaysian general by-election, 4 June 1966: Bruas Upon the death of incumbent, Yeoh Tat Beng
Party	Candidate	Votes	%	∆%
Alliance	Chew Biow Chuon	9,464	49.17	▼4.15
PPP	Wong Kok Weng	6,426	33.39	▲33.39
PMIP	Abdul Rahim Mat Salleh	3,357	17.44	▲17.44
Total valid votes		19,247	100.00	
Total rejected ballots		364		
Unreturned ballots		0		
Turnout		19,611	72.60	▲6.80
Registered electors		27,014		
Majority		3,038	16.31	▼3.17
Alliance hold		Swing		

Malaysian general election, 1964: Bruas
Party	Candidate	Votes	%	∆%
Alliance	Yeoh Tat Beng	10,587	53.32	▼19.43
UDP	Loi Kiew Hang	6,719	33.84	▲33.84
Independent	Pachik Ahmad	2,550	12.84	▲12.84
Total valid votes		19,856	100.00	
Total rejected ballots		1,002		
Unreturned ballots		0		
Turnout		20,858	79.40	▲12.55
Registered electors		26,270		
Majority		3,868	19.48	▲14.59
Alliance gain from Independent		Swing		?

Malayan general election, 1959: Bruas
Party	Candidate	Votes	%
Independent	Yeoh Tat Beng	5,967	38.78
Alliance	Mohd Noor Mohamed	5,215	33.89
PPP	K. Raman	4,205	27.33
Total valid votes		15,387	100.00
Total rejected ballots		913	
Unreturned ballots		0	
Turnout		16,300	66.85
Registered electors		24,383	
Majority		752	4.89
This was a new constituency created.
