= Malaysian Solidarity Convention =

Conferenced opposed to Malay supremacy in Malaysia

Malaysian Solidarity Convention: Majlis Solidariti Malaysia (Malay); 马来西亚团结大会 (Chinese); Mǎláixīyà Tuánjié Dàhuì
- Leader: Lee Kuan Yew
- Founder: Lee Kuan Yew
- Founded: May 9, 1965
- Dissolved: June 10, 1966
- Headquarters: Kuala Lumpur, Malaysia
- Ideology: Civic nationalism Multiracialism; Malaysian Malaysia; Anti-Article 153
- Political position: Centre to centre-right
- Member parties: People’s Action Party; United Democratic Party; People's Progressive Party; Sarawak United Peoples' Party; Machinda Party
- Dewan Negara: 0 / 70 (2nd Parliament of Malaysia)
- Dewan Rakyat: 17 / 159 (2nd Parliament of Malaysia)

The Malaysian Solidarity Convention was a confederation of political parties formed on 9 May 1965 at Sri Temasek in Singapore. The confederation existed until 9 August to oppose Article 153 of the Constitution of Malaysia.

This article specifically provided special quotas for the Malay and other indigenous peoples of Malaysia in admission to the public service and to public education institutions, and the awarding of public scholarships and trade licences. It also authorised the government to create Malay monopolies in particular trades. Critics have called such affirmative action for the Malays to be racial discrimination against other Malaysian citizens, with the goal of creating a Malay supremacist state.

The rallying motto of MSC was Malaysian Malaysia, equal rights for all citizens regardless of race or religion. It was not a mere tautology because it distinguished between nationality and ethnic classification. The complaint was that Malaysia was not being "Malaysian" by discriminating against non-Malay Malaysians, and was rather being a "Malay Malaysia".

== History ==
The convention was a reaction of conflict between Singapore's governing party, the PAP and Malaya's governing party, UMNO. The conflict arose due to the PAP's participation in the 1964 Malaysian general election which the party intended to exert more rights to Singapore.

Early efforts to organise cooperation between Opposition parties were done as early as 12 February 1965. The meeting was done at Sri Temasek and were attended by members from PAP, UDP, PPP, SUPP, PAS and UPKO.

The MSC functioned as a political bloc which was led by Lee Kuan Yew and the People's Action Party when Singapore was still part of Malaysia. It composed of multi-racial parties such as the PAP, the People's Progressive Party, the United Democratic Party, Sarawak United People Party and Machinda party.

At the MSC's first and only general meeting, several leaders from these parties gave speeches supporting a Malaysian Malaysia. D. R. Seenivasagam in his speech accused the National Alliance of using Article 153 of the Constitution of Malaysia to "bully non-Malays".

PAP's participation in the convention ended when Singapore seceded from Malaysia. By then, cracks began emerging within the convention, causing SUPP and Machinda to leave by the end of 1965. PPP's decision to cooperate with the Labour Party of Malaya (LPM) during the 1966 Bruas by-election caused the UDP to question its loyalty to the convention. The convention officially disbanded when the PPP maintained its decision to affirm its cooperation with LPM.

== Government offices ==
=== State governments ===
- Singapore (1965)

Note: bold as Prime Minister, italic as junior partner
