= Mohd Fakhrudin Abdul Aziz =

Malaysian politician

Yang Berhormat Tuan Mohd Fakhrudin Abdul Aziz MLA
- محمد فخرالدين عبدالعزيز

Member of the Perak State Legislative Assembly for Kamunting
- Incumbent
- Assumed office 19 December 2022
- Preceded by: Muhd Fadhil Nuruddin (PH–AMANAH)
- Majority: 3,100 (2022)

Personal details
- Born: Mohd Fakhrudin bin Abdul Aziz Kampung Jelutung, Changkat Jering, Perak
- Party: Malaysian Islamic Party (PAS)
- Other political affiliations: Pakatan Rakyat (PR) (2008–2015); Gagasan Sejahtera (GS) (2016–2020); Perikatan Nasional (PN) (2020–present)
- Children: 4
- Education: Maahad Tarbiyah Al-Islamiah
- Alma mater: Universiti Ar Raniry, Acheh (BA)

Mohd Fakhrudin bin Abdul Aziz is a Malaysian politician and physician who served as Member of the Perak State Legislative Assembly (MLA) for Kamunting since November 2022. He is a member of Malaysian Islamic Party (PAS), a component party of Perikatan Nasional (PN), formerly PR and GS coalitions.

== Election results ==
Perak State Legislative Assembly
Year	Constituency	Candidate	Votes	Pct	Opponent(s)	Votes	Pct	Ballots cast	Majority	Turnout
2013	N16 Kamunting	Mohd Fakhrudin Abdul Aziz (PAS)	10,897	48.04%	Mohamad Zahir Abdul Khalid (UMNO)	11,784	51.96%	22,893	887	84.10%
2018	N16 Kamunting	Mohd Fakhrudin Abdul Aziz (PAS)	5,276	22.65%	Muhd Fadhil Nuruddin (AMANAH)	9,898	42.50%	23,980	1,780	79.90%
2018	N16 Kamunting	Mohd Fakhrudin Abdul Aziz (PAS)	5,276	22.65%	Mohamad Zahir Abdul Khalid (UMNO)	8,118	34.85%	23,980	1,780	79.90%
2022	N16 Kamunting	Mohd Fakhrudin Abdul Aziz (PAS)	13,045	43.98%	Muhd Fadhil Nuruddin (AMANAH)	9,945	33.53%	29,664	3,100	74.44%
2022	N16 Kamunting	Mohd Fakhrudin Abdul Aziz (PAS)	13,045	43.98%	Ahmad Shalimin Ahmad Shaffie (UMNO)	6,674	22.50%	29,664	3,100	74.44%
