= Ngeh Koo Ham =

Malaysian politician, advocate and solicitor

Yang Berhormat Dato' Ngeh Koo Ham DPMP MP
- 倪可汉
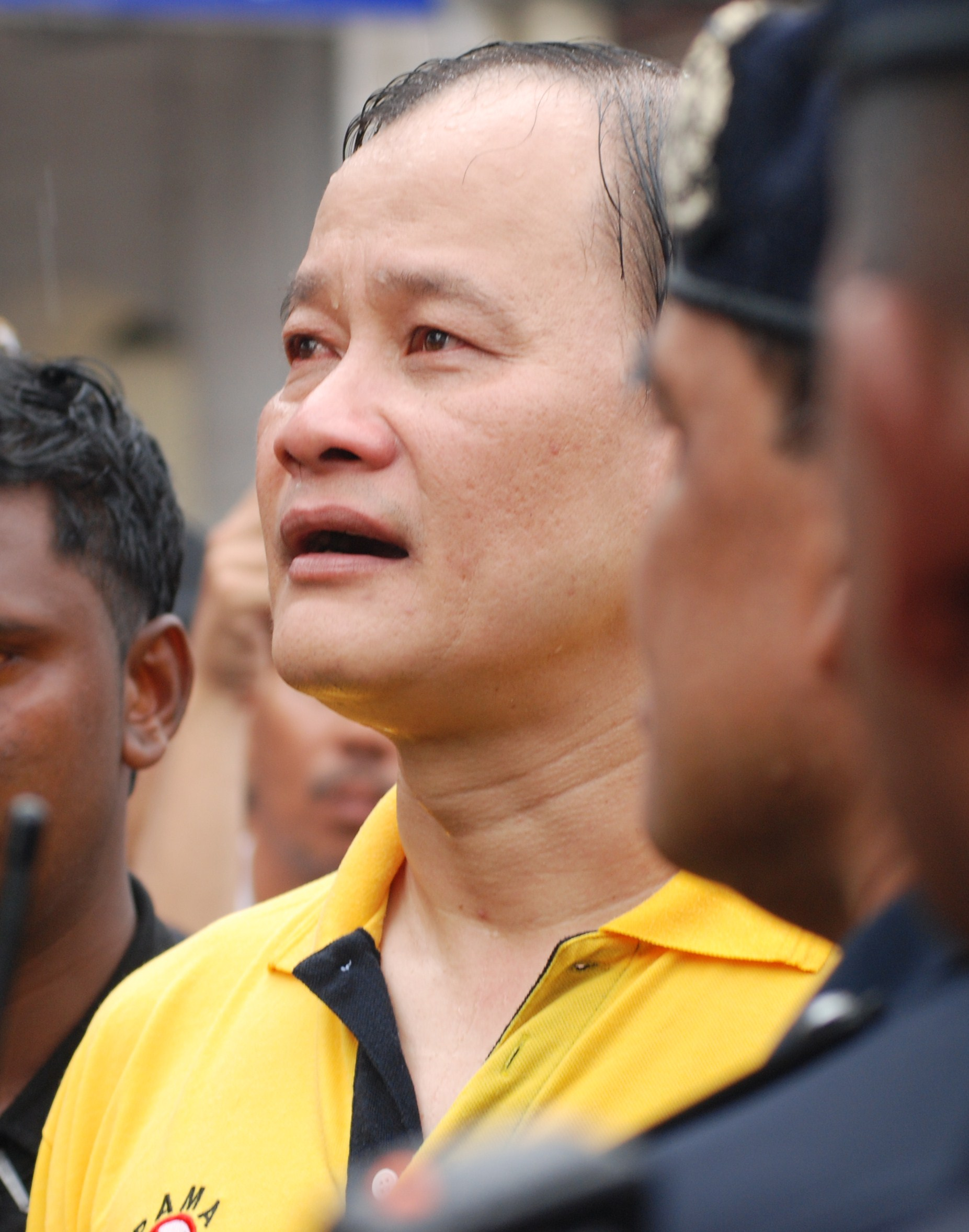
- Ngeh in 2006

16th Speaker of the Perak State Legislative Assembly
- In office 2 July 2018 – 12 May 2020
- Monarch: Nazrin Shah
- Menteri Besar: Ahmad Faizal Azumu
- Deputy: Aminuddin Zulkipli
- Preceded by: Thangasvari Suppiah
- Succeeded by: Mohamad Zahir Abdul Khalid
- Constituency: Non-MLA

Member of the Perak State Executive Council
- In office 28 March 2008 – 10 February 2009
- Monarch: Azlan Shah
- Menteri Besar: Mohammad Nizar Jamaluddin
- Portfolio: Infrastructure & Public Utilities, Energy & Water and Non-Muslim Affairs
- Preceded by: Ho Cheng Wang
- Succeeded by: Ramly Zahari (Infrastructure, Public Utilities, Energy and Water); Mah Hang Soon (Non-Muslim Affairs)
- Constituency: Sitiawan

National Treasurer of the Democratic Action Party
- Incumbent
- Assumed office 16 March 2025
- Assistant: Ng Sze Han
- Secretary-General: Anthony Loke Siew Fook
- Preceded by: Fong Kui Lun

Member of the Malaysian Parliament for Beruas
- Incumbent
- Assumed office 8 March 2008
- Preceded by: Lim Keng Yaik (BN–Gerakan)
- Majority: 1,828 (2008); 5,057 (2013); 27,954 (2018); 33,971 (2022)

Member of the Perak State Legislative Assembly for Sitiawan
- In office 21 March 2004 – 9 May 2018
- Preceded by: Hu Chan You (BA–DAP)
- Succeeded by: Position abolished
- Majority: 5,137 (2004); 8,529 (2008); 11,820 (2013)

Personal details
- Born: Ngeh Koo Ham; 29 September 1961 (age 65) Ayer Tawar, Perak, Federation of Malaya (now Malaysia)
- Citizenship: Malaysian
- Party: Democratic Action Party (DAP)
- Other political affiliations: Gagasan Rakyat (GR) (1990–1995); Barisan Alternatif (BA) (1999–2004); Pakatan Rakyat (PR) (2008–2015); Pakatan Harapan (PH) (since 2015)
- Spouse: Cheok Foong Ling (石凤玲)
- Relations: Nga Kor Ming (cousin)
- Children: 3
- Education: University of Malaya
- Occupation: Politician
- Profession: Advocate; solicitor
- Website: ngehkooham.blogspot.com

Ngeh Koo Ham

Chinese name
- Traditional Chinese: 倪可漢
- Simplified Chinese: 倪可汉
Transcriptions
Standard Mandarin
- Hanyu Pinyin: Ní Kěhàn
Southern Min
- Hokkien POJ: Gê Khó-hàn

Ngeh Koo Ham (simplified Chinese: 倪可汉; traditional Chinese: 倪可漢; pinyin: Ní Kěhàn; Pe̍h-ōe-jī: Gê Khó-hàn, Bàng-uâ-cê: Ngà̤ Kō̤-háng; born 29 September 1961), also known as James Ngeh, is a Malaysian politician, advocate and solicitor who has served as the Member of Parliament (MP) for Beruas since March 2008. He served as Speaker of the Perak State Legislative Assembly from July 2018 to May 2020, Member of the Perak State Executive Council (EXCO) in the Pakatan Rakyat (PR) administration under former Menteri Besar Mohammad Nizar Jamaluddin from March 2008 to the collapse of the PR administration in February 2009 and Member of the Assembly (MLA) for Sitiawan from March 2004 to May 2018. He is a member of the Democratic Action Party (DAP), a component party of the Pakatan Harapan (PH) and formerly PR, Barisan Alternatif (BA) and Gagasan Rakyat (GR) coalitions. He has also served as the National Treasurer of DAP since March 2025 and is the State Advisor of DAP of Perak. He was also Deputy Secretary-General of DAP, Member of the Central Executive Committee (CEC) of DAP and State Chairman of DAP of Perak.

== Personal life ==
A native of Ayer Tawar, Perak, Ngeh comes from an old Ayer Tawar Methodist family. Ngeh's parents were rubber tappers in Ayer Tawar. He was christened James by the late Rev. Koh Gie Bing. As a student, he was active in the Methodist Youth Fellowship and later with the Persatuan Kristian Varsiti (PKV, part of the International Fellowship of Evangelical Students) at Universiti Malaya where he obtained a Bachelor of Laws. He has also served on the Local Church Executive Council (LCEC) of the Ayer Tawar Chinese Methodist Church (ATCMC) and provided legal counsel to the Methodist Church in Malaysia. He is a regular communicant member of ATCMC where he often also provides translation during Sunday worship.

He married Cheok Foong Ling from Setiawan in 1992. They have three children.

== Education ==
Ngeh attended the Methodist English School, Ayer Tawar; Sekolah Menengah Jenis Kebangsaan (SMJK) Shyr Tien, Ayer Tawar; and the (Methodist) Anglo-Chinese School, Setiawan. He went on to graduate from Universiti Malaya in Bachelor of Laws.

== Professional career ==
Ngeh practised as a lawyer with Nga Hock Cheh and Co. (no relation) in Sitiawan before starting his own law firm, Ngeh and Co, which is headquartered in Ayer Tawar, with branches in Ipoh, Perak and Kuala Lumpur.

In one of his more famous cases during his legal career, Ngeh Koo Ham represented Sitiawan businessman Yong Kon Fatt, who was sued by Indah Water Konsortium Sdn Bhd (IWK) in January 2005 for refusing to pay RM1,074 for sewerage services purportedly provided to his house at Taman Samudera in Lumut. The High Court sitting in Ipoh ruled that 'those who have made payments to IWK but had not received any sewerage services could demand refunds'.

== Political career ==
In DAP, Ngeh has been the party's chairperson in Perak since 2000 until 2014, when the post changed hands to Nga Kor Ming, his cousin.

Ngeh first stood in the 1990 general election against Lim Keng Yaik for the parliamentary seat of Beruas. He nevertheless lost to Lim, president of Parti Gerakan Rakyat Malaysia (Gerakan) and a powerful Barisan Nasional (BN) cabinet minister, by a narrow margin. In the 1995 general election, he contested but lost in the Batu Gajah seat. In the 1999 general election, he contested but lost in both the Ipoh Timor parliamentary seat and Pasir Pinji state seat in Perak.

Ngeh begun to be a state assemblyman for Sitiawan, Perak for three terms continuously following his victories in the 2004, 2008 and 2013 general elections. He also served as the head of the Opposition in the Perak State Legislative Assembly from 2004 to 2008. After 2008 election, with the formation of the Perak new state government by the Pakatan Rakyat (PR) coalition of DAP, People's Justice Party (PKR) and Pan-Malaysian Islamic Party (PAS); which was faced with the problem of the candidate of new Chief Minister. Among the 3 parties, DAP has the most seats, but the Perak state constitution says that the Chief Minister must be a Malay Muslim. Ngeh, being the Chairman of the Perak DAP, is ethnic Chinese and a Christian. They initially agreed that Mohammad Nizar Jamaluddin from PAS should be the Chief Minister but in the end try persuading the Sultan, Sultan Azlan Shah, to appoint Ngeh as the non-Malay, non-Muslim Chief Minister. They listed three candidates, the other two being Mohammad Nizar Jamaluddin and Mohd Radzi from PKR. Finally the Sultan rejected Ngeh and wanted to appoint a Malay who is a professional. All of the Malay state assemblymen in PKR have only Form 5 (Secondary school year 5) qualification. Thus Mohammad Nizar, being an engineer and carrying the highest position in PAS among the Perak PAS state assemblymen, became the new Chief Minister. Ngeh was appointed to the state executive committee as senior state executive councillor, with the portfolios of Infrastructure and Public Amenities; Energy and Water; and Non-Muslim Affairs during the short-lived state government was led by PR from March 2008 to May 2009, which the PR state government had collapsed due to the 2009 Perak political crisis.

In the 2008 and 2013 general elections, Ngeh also contested and won the Beruas parliamentary seat to become the Beruas MP and Sitiawan state assemblyman concurrently. In the 2018 general election (GE14), Ngeh contested just the parliamentary seat and did not contest his state seat which was abolished. After GE14 which saw the Pakatan Harapan (PH) taking over the federal and Perak state governments, Ngeh was appointed the Speaker of the Perak State Legislative Assembly on 3 July 2018 despite not being an assemblyman. He is the first speaker of Chinese descent. Ngeh resigns as the Perak Speaker on 12 May 2020 after the collapse of the Pakatan Harapan (PH)'s state and federal governments in the 2020 political crisis. As MP for Beruas, he called for the appointment of non Muslims experts to the committee reviewing the power of shariah courts.

== Controversies and issues ==
=== Anti-Islam remarks ===
In 2012, Ngeh drew flak with remarks over the "Innocence of Muslims" film which insulted Muhammad and Islam. Ngeh had allegedly tweeted: "Khairy wants Muslim protest against Sam Bacile. For Islam or for his political gains? Are Muslims wasting too much time and energy on this?" Ngeh apologised after it received widespread criticisms from Muslims and had the post removed.

=== Acceptance of Perak state Datukship award and title ===
In April 2008, Sultan Azlan Shah of Perak in conjunction with his 80th birthday, had bestowed Ngeh the Darjah Dato Paduka Mahkota Perak (DPMP) award which carries the title Dato'. He is the first actively serving DAP politician to be conferred (and accepted) a Malaysian chivalrous title. Later in 2012, DAP chairman Karpal Singh had rebuked Ngeh and Teng Chang Khim on their acceptance "Datukship" awards of Perak in 2008 and Selangor in 2010 respectively; which had breached the party's long-standing principal agreed upon since the mid-1990s on DAP elected representatives receiving awards during their active political service. Ngeh had claimed that the party's CEC had discussed and consented to the award that was conferred upon him.

=== Fire at his house ===
On 10 January 2024, a fire broke out at Ngeh's house at around 3 in the morning. The fire greatly damaged the garage ceiling, roof and one of his cars, while slightly damaging 2 other cars. The fire is believed to have been caused by a Molotov cocktail thrown into his house as an arson attack. Police are currently investigating this incident.

== Election results ==
Perak State Legislative Assembly
Year	Constituency	Candidate	Votes	Pct	Opponent(s)	Votes	Pct	Ballots cast	Majority	Turnout
1999	N24 Pasir Pinji	Ngeh Koo Ham (DAP)	7,849	46.11%	Chan Kam (MCA)	8,868	52.10%	17,022	1,019	65.95%
2004	N50 Sitiawan	Ngeh Koo Ham (DAP)	9,874	54.92%	Ling Mee Lin (MCA)	4,737	26.35%	17,980	5,137	65.81%
2008	N50 Sitiawan	Ngeh Koo Ham (DAP)	12,381	74.38%	Ding Siew Chee (MCA)	3,852	23.12%	16,645	8,529	70.43%
2013	N50 Sitiawan	Ngeh Koo Ham (DAP)	17,292	74.75%	Ting Tai Fook (MCA)	5,472	23.66%	23,133	11,820	81.00%

Parliament of Malaysia
Year	Constituency	Candidate	Votes	Pct	Opponent(s)	Votes	Pct	Ballots cast	Majority	Turnout
1990	P062 Beruas	Ngeh Koo Ham (DAP)	13,026	46.99%	Lim Keng Yaik (Gerakan)	13,889	50.11%	27,718	863	71.38%
1995	P063 Batu Gajah	Ngeh Koo Ham (DAP)	18,576	46.32%	Yeong Chee Wah (MCA)	20,155	50.25%	40,110	1,579	68.63%
1999	P061 Ipoh Timor	Ngeh Koo Ham (DAP)	23,146	45.90%	Thong Fah Chong (MCA)	25,273	50.12%	50,422	2,127	64.73%
1999	P061 Ipoh Timor	Ngeh Koo Ham (DAP)	23,146	45.90%	Mohd Yusoff Omar (MDP)	427	0.85%	50,422	2,127	64.73%
2008	P068 Beruas	Ngeh Koo Ham (DAP)	15,831	51.36%	Chang Ko Youn (Gerakan)	14,003	45.43%	30,821	1,828	71.22%
2013	P068 Beruas	Ngeh Koo Ham (DAP)	21,939	56.51%	Chang Ko Youn (Gerakan)	16,882	43.49%	39,586	5,057	80.45%
2018	P068 Beruas	Ngeh Koo Ham (DAP)	41,231	68.01%	Pang Chok King (Gerakan)	13,277	21.90%	60,267	27,954	75.98%
2018	P068 Beruas	Ngeh Koo Ham (DAP)	41,231	68.01%	Md Nazeer KM Hamid (PAS)	5,759	9.50%	60,267	27,954	75.98%
2022	P068 Beruas	Ngeh Koo Ham (DAP)	46,710	64.72%	Ong Kean Sing (Gerakan)	12,739	17.65%	72,173	33,971	66.17%
2022	P068 Beruas	Ngeh Koo Ham (DAP)	46,710	64.72%	Ding Siew Chee (MCA)	12,724	17.63%	72,173	33,971	66.17%

== Honours ==
=== Honours of Malaysia ===
- Malaysia
  - Recipient of the 17th Yang di-Pertuan Agong Installation Medal (2024)
- Perak
  - Knight Commander of the Order of the Perak State Crown (DPMP) – Dato' (2008)
