= 2008 Perak state election =

Malaysian state election

- 8 March 2008

59 seats to the Perak State Legislative Assembly 30 seats needed for a majority
- Registered: -

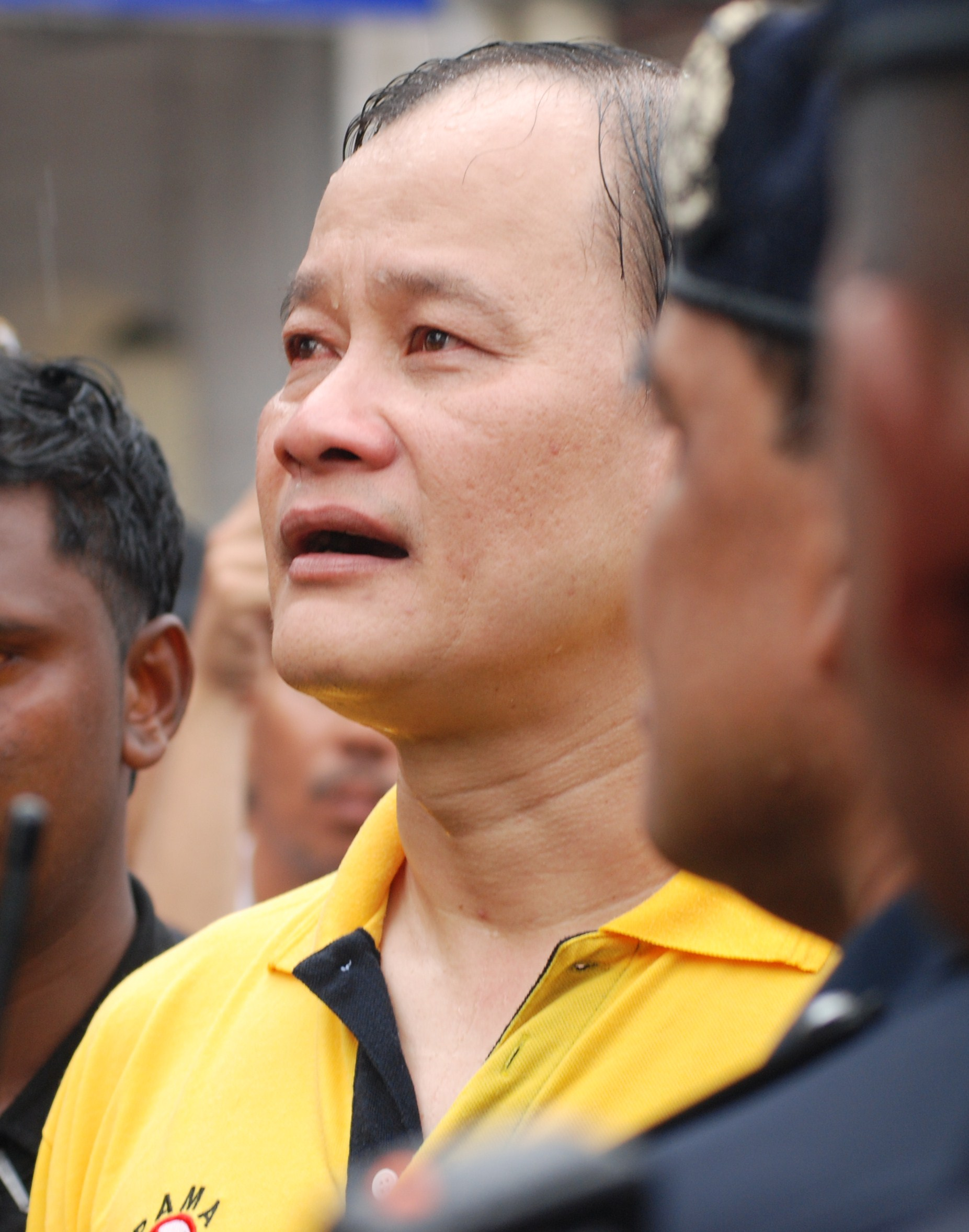

	Majority party	Minority party	Third party
Leader	Tajol Rosli Mohd Ghazali	Ngeh Koo Ham	Zulkifly Ibrahim
Party	UMNO	DAP	PKR
Alliance	Barisan Nasional	DAP-PAS-PKR coalition (informal)	DAP-PAS-PKR coalition (informal)
Leader since	2003	2000	2007
Leader's seat	Pengkalan Hulu	Sitiawan	Bukit Chandan (lost)
Last election	52 seats, 59.61%	7 seats, 17.72%	0 seats, 8.63%
Seats won	28	18	7
Seat change	▼24	▲11	▲7
Popular vote	400,682 (Note: All the figures of votes and seats are a combined result of all the component parties in BN.)	188,484	118,824
Percentage	47.38%	22.29%	14.05%
Swing	▼12.23	▲4.57	▲5.42
	Fourth party
Leader	Ahmad Awang
Party	PAS
Alliance	DAP-PAS-PKR coalition (informal)
Leader since	2003
Leader's seat	Not contesting
Last election	0 seats, 13.91%
Seats won	6
Seat change	▲6
Popular vote	136,046
Percentage	16.04%
Swing	▲2.18
Menteri Besar before election
Tajol Rosli Mohd Ghazali
Barisan Nasional (UMNO)
Elected Menteri Besar
Mohammad Nizar Jamaluddin
Pakatan Rakyat (PAS)

The 12th Perak state election was held on 8 March 2008. Polling took place in 59 constituencies throughout the State of Perak, with each electing a state assemblyman to the Perak State Legislative Assembly. The election was conducted by the Malaysian Election Commission. The state election was held concurrently with the 2008 Malaysian general election.

The election proved to be a watershed in Perak's history, as the incumbent government from Barisan Nasional (BN) was handed an unprecedented and shocking defeat by the opposition, making the election the second time Perak's ruling party was voted out of power; the first was in 1969 when then Alliance Party failed to gain a majority against opposition parties. The informal coalition of Democratic Action Party (DAP), Parti Islam Se-Malaysia (PAS) and Parti Keadilan Rakyat (PKR) won 31 seats out of the 59 seats, gaining a simple majority in the Perak State Legislative Assembly.

== Results ==
Party or alliance		Votes	%	Seats	+/–
DAP-PAS-PKR coalition	Democratic Action Party	188,484	22.29	18	+11
DAP-PAS-PKR coalition	People's Justice Party	118,824	14.05	7	+7
DAP-PAS-PKR coalition	Pan-Malaysian Islamic Party	136,046	16.09	6	+6
DAP-PAS-PKR coalition	Total	443,354	52.43	31	+24
Barisan Nasional	United Malays National Organisation	244,789	28.95	27	–7
Barisan Nasional	Malaysian Chinese Association	98,341	11.63	1	–9
Barisan Nasional	Malaysian Indian Congress	24,216	2.86	0	–4
Barisan Nasional	Parti Gerakan Rakyat Malaysia	27,595	3.26	0	–4
Barisan Nasional	People's Progressive Party	5,741	0.68	0	0
Barisan Nasional	Total	400,682	47.38	28	–24
Independents		1,635	0.19	0	0
Total		845,671	100.00	59	0
Valid votes		845,671	97.59		
Invalid/blank votes		20,844	2.41		
Total votes		866,515	100.00		
Registered voters/turnout		1,196,160	72.44		
Source: The Star

== Aftermath ==
=== Menteri Besar and State EXCO appointment controversy ===
As the party with the largest number of MLAs in the winning bloc, DAP has the priority in choosing the new Menteri Besar. However the state constitution required the Menteri Besar to be Malay-Muslim, and as all of DAP MLAs are not Malay-Muslim, this disqualifies DAP from having a Menteri Besar candidate, although there is a provision in the state constitution that allows the Sultan of Perak to waive this requirement at his discretion. Regardless, DAP nominated its state chief and MLA for Sitiawan, Ngeh Koo Ham as its candidate. PAS also named Mohammad Nizar Jamaluddin, MLA for Pasir Panjang and PAS Perak Secretary as its candidate. From PKR, it nominated its state treasurer and MLA for Behrang, Jamaluddin Mohd Radzi. The list of names were submitted to the Regent of Perak to be extended to the Sultan of Perak, in a meeting between leader of the coalition and the Regent on 10 March.

The crisis seemingly was averted when Nizar was named the Sultan's choice of the new Menteri Besar of Perak on 12 March 2008, and were planned to be sworn in on the next day. However DAP Adviser Lim Kit Siang announced his party's disapproval of the decision on the same day, and threatened for DAP to boycott the swearing-in ceremony. Although Lim later apologized to Sultan of Perak and the Regent of Perak for his statement and DAP retracted their boycott threat, PKR through its deputy president Syed Husin Ali voiced their disagreement about the state EXCO member composition which are not favourable to PKR, and threatened to pull out of the state government. The argument were resolved on 14 March, after further discussion between the three parties, when it was decided that DAP would hold 6 EXCO posts including Ngeh as Deputy Menteri Besar 1, PKR 3 Exco posts including an Indian PKR MLA as Deputy Menteri Besar 2, and PAS 1 Exco post, who all will work together with the Menteri Besar-elect, Nizar.

Nizar were finally sworn in on 17 March (coincidentally on Nizar's birthday), in front of the Regent of Perak, Raja Nazrin Shah, after the 4-day delay from the original swear-in date caused by DAP-PKR-PAS disagreements. After further discussions between the three parties, the 10 state EXCO members were sworn in on 28 March, initially without portfolio announced; the portfolio for each EXCO member was confirmed two days later after the first EXCO meeting, which saw the 2 Deputy Menteri Besar posts announced earlier dropped in favour of Ngeh as senior EXCO member. In response of the EXCO composition of only one Indian MLA appointed, A. Sivasubramaniam, the MLA for Buntong, resigned from DAP on 31 March, claiming DAP did not fulfill the promise of appointing two Indian MLA in the state EXCO; he retracted his resignation several hours later after discussion with the party leaders.

The DAP-PKR-PAS coalition were later known as Pakatan Rakyat from 1 April 2008.

=== BN post-mortem ===
On 25 January 2009, BN's MLA for Bota, Nasarudin Hashim, announced his resignation from UMNO and BN, and joining PR and PKR. Bearing responsibility for the defection of Nasaruddin, Perak state BN and UMNO chief and also former Menteri Besar, Tajol Rosli Mohd Ghazali, tendered his resignation of all the party posts, which was accepted by UMNO's Supreme Council on 30 January. However on 4 February, Nasaruddin announced his return to BN and UMNO.

After Tajol's resignation, Najib Razak assumed responsibility as interim Perak state chief of UMNO and BN, until UMNO's party election on March that year, which saw Zambry Abdul Kadir elected to the post.

=== 2009 Perak constitutional crisis ===
The Pakatan Rakyat government led by Nizar only lasts for 11 months until February 2009, when after two PKR MLA (Jamaluddin and Mohd Osman Mohd Jailu) and one DAP MLA (Hee Yit Foong) disappears from public and subsequently their announcement to become an independent who supports BN, Nizar and the PR government were forced to resign by the Sultan of Perak as they could not command the majority of the Perak Assembly. A new BN government, led by Zambry Abdul Kadir as Menteri Besar, were sworn in on the same day Nizar resigned. This led to a series of court cases between Nizar and Zambry for the Perak government legitimacy, until the final verdict which saw Zambry's government's accepted under the law in February 2010.

This is the first time the government of the state changed in Peninsular Malaysia as a result of allegiance changing between MLAs; previously this only happened in East Malaysia, with the last time was on 1994 in Sabah.
