= Arthur Chiong Sen Sern =

Malaysian politician

Yang Berhormat Tuan Arthur Chiong Sen Sern MLA
- 张善深

Member of the Johor State Legislative Assembly for Bukit Batu
- Incumbent
- Assumed office 12 March 2022
- Preceded by: Jimmy Puah Wee Tse (PH–PKR)
- Majority: 137 (2022)

Branch Chief of Kulai of PKR
- Incumbent
- Assumed office 2025
- President: Anwar Ibrahim

Deputy Branch Chief of Tebrau of PKR
- In office 2022–2025
- President: Anwar Ibrahim

Personal details
- Born: 3 February 1990 (age 36)
- Party: Malaysian Chinese Association (MCA) (–2018); People's Justice Party (PKR) (2019–present)
- Other political affiliations: Barisan Nasional (BN) (–2018); Pakatan Harapan (PH) (2019–present)
- Occupation: Politician

Arthur Chiong Sen Sern (born 3 February 1990) is a Malaysian politician who has served as Member of the Johor State Legislative Assembly (MLA) for Bukit Batu. He is a member of the People's Justice Party (PKR), a component party of the Pakatan Harapan (PH) coalition. He also served as Director of Strategies of PKR of Johor, Deputy Branch Chief of Tebrau of PKR and Branch Chief of Kulai of PKR. He is also presently the only PKR Johor MLA.

== Political career ==
In 2018, Arthur Chiong Sen Sern quit the Malaysian Chinese Association (MCA) after the general election. In 2019, he joined PKR and served as PKR Tebrau Branch Secretary cum Treasurer of PKR Tebrau Youth. In 2022 Johor state election, he was elected as Bukit Batu assemblyman with a slim majority of 137 votes. On May 29 of the same year, he was elected as the Deputy Branch Chief of Tebrau of PKR. On 21 April 2025, he successfully elected as Branch Chief of Kulai of PKR, defeat Gopalakrishnan Subramaniam.

== Election results ==
Johor State Legislative Assembly
Year	Constituency	Candidate	Votes	Pct	Opponent(s)	Votes	Pct	Ballots cast	Majority	Turnout
2022	N51 Bukit Batu	Arthur Chiong Sen Sern (PKR)	9,439	39.20%	Supayyah Solaimuthu (MIC)	9,302	38.63%	24,820	137	53.68%
2022	N51 Bukit Batu	Arthur Chiong Sen Sern (PKR)	9,439	39.20%	Tan Heng Choon (GERAKAN)	3,989	16.57%	24,820	137	53.68%
2022	N51 Bukit Batu	Arthur Chiong Sen Sern (PKR)	9,439	39.20%	Lee Ming Wen (WARISAN)	1,349	5.60%	24,820	137	53.68%
