= Ng Siew Lai =

Malaysian politician

Ng Siew Lai DJN
- 吴秀丽

Member of the Penang State Legislative Assembly for Bukit Tengah
- In office 29 November 1999 – 8 March 2008
- Preceded by: Liang Thau Kang (BN–Gerakan)
- Succeeded by: Ong Chin Wen (PR–PKR)
- Majority: 3,600 (1999); 4,026 (2004)

Personal details
- Born: 22 July 1961 (age 64) Penang, Federation of Malaya
- Party: Parti Gerakan Rakyat Malaysia (Gerakan)
- Other political affiliations: Barisan Nasional (BN) (–2018); Perikatan Nasional (PN) (2021–present)
- Occupation: Politician

Ng Siew Lai is a Malaysian politician who served as Member of the Penang State Legislative Assembly (MLA) for Bukit Tengah from November 1999 to March 2008. She is a member of Parti Gerakan Rakyat Malaysia (Gerakan), a component party of Perikatan Nasional (PN) and formerly BN coalitions.

== Election results ==
Penang State Legislative Assembly
| Year | Constituency | Candidate | Votes | Pct | Opponent(s) | Votes | Pct | Ballots cast | Majority | Turnout |
|---|---|---|---|---|---|---|---|---|---|---|
| 1999 | N15 Bukit Tengah | Ng Siew Lai (Gerakan) | 11,480 | 59.30% | Tan Ah Huat (DAP) | 7,880 | 40.70% | 19,825 | 3,600 | 77.33% |
| 2004 | N17 Bukit Tengah | Ng Siew Lai (Gerakan) | 7,116 | 69.72% | Law Choo Kiang (PKR) | 3,090 | 30.28% | 10,435 | 4,026 | 77.77% |
| 2008 | N17 Bukit Tengah | Ng Siew Lai (Gerakan) | 4,832 | 41.77% | Ong Chin Wen (PKR) | 6,736 | 58.23% | 11,835 | 1,904 | 78.90% |

Parliament of Malaysia
| Year | Constituency | Candidate | Votes | Pct | Opponent(s) | Votes | Pct | Ballots cast | Majority | Turnout |
|---|---|---|---|---|---|---|---|---|---|---|
| 2018 | P049 Tanjong | Ng Siew Lai (Gerakan) | 5,064 | 12.75% | Chow Kon Yeow (DAP) | 34,663 | 87.25% | 39,727 | 29,599 | 80.90% |

== Honours ==
- Penang
  - Member of the Order of the Defender of State (DJN) (2005)
