= Alor Setar (federal constituency) =

Federal constituency of Kedah, Malaysia

Alor Setar (P009)
Kedah constituency

Federal constituency
- Legislature: Dewan Rakyat
- MP: Afnan Hamimi Taib Azamudden; PN
- Constituency created: 1955
- First contested: 1955
- Last contested: 2022

Demographics
- Population (2020): 119,010
- Electors (2023): 105,979
- Area (km²): 111
- Pop. density (per km²): 1,072.2

Alor Setar (formerly Alor Star) is a federal constituency in Kota Setar District, Kedah, Malaysia, that has been represented in the Dewan Rakyat since 1955.

The federal constituency was created in the 1955 redistribution and is mandated to return a single member to the Dewan Rakyat under the first past the post voting system.

== Demographics ==
https://live.chinapress.com.my/ge15/parliament/KEDAH

Ethnic breakdown of Alor Setar's electorate as of 2022
1. Malay (63.2%)
2. Chinese (31.7%)
3. Indian (4.25%)
4. Other ethnicities (0.81%)

As of 2020, Alor Setar has a population of 119,010 people.

Age breakdown of Alor Setar's electorate as of 2022
1. 18-20 (5.12%)
2. 21-29 (19.3%)
3. 30-39 (21.8%)
4. 40-49 (16.6%)
5. 50-59 (14.1%)
6. 60-69 (13.1%)
7. 70-79 (7.19%)
8. 80-89 (2.23%)
9. above 90 (0.57%)
Gender breakdown of Alor Setar's electorate as of 2022
1. Male (49.0%)
2. Female (51.0%)

== History ==
=== Polling districts ===
According to the federal gazette issued on 18 July 2023, the Alor Setar constituency is divided into 52 polling districts.

State constituency	Polling Districts	Code	Location
Suka Menanti (N12)	Taman Malaysia	009/12/01	SK Seri Amar Diraja
Suka Menanti (N12)	Taman Golf	009/12/02	Jabatan Kebudayaan Dan Kesenian Negara Kedah
Suka Menanti (N12)	Taman Uda	009/12/03	SK Taman Uda
Suka Menanti (N12)	Jalan Sultanah	009/12/04	SMK Sultanah Bahiyah
Suka Menanti (N12)	Alor Semadom	009/12/05	SK Hj Mohd Shariff
Suka Menanti (N12)	Seberang Pumpong	009/12/06	SJK (C) Pumpong
Suka Menanti (N12)	Suka Menanti	009/12/07	SK Suka Menanti
Suka Menanti (N12)	Taman Wira	009/12/08	SMK Mergong
Suka Menanti (N12)	Gunong Sali	009/12/09	SK Seri Perdana
Suka Menanti (N12)	Kampung Berjaya	009/12/10	SJK (C) Long Chuan
Suka Menanti (N12)	Telok Yan	009/12/11	SJK (C) Long Chuan
Suka Menanti (N12)	Kampung Seberang Terus	009/12/12	SMK Tunku Abdul Rahman
Suka Menanti (N12)	Taman Rakyat Mergong	009/12/13	SMK Tunku Abdul Rahman
Suka Menanti (N12)	Kampung Batin	009/12/14	SK Mergong
Suka Menanti (N12)	Alor Merah	009/12/15	SMK Alor Merah
Kota Darul Aman (N13)	Kanchut	009/13/01	SK Wan Sulaiman Sidiq
Kota Darul Aman (N13)	Tambang Badak	009/13/02	SK Wan Sulaiman Sidiq
Kota Darul Aman (N13)	Bakar Bata	009/13/03	SMK Syed Mohamed Al-Bukhary
Kota Darul Aman (N13)	Jalan Lumpur	009/13/04	SJK (C) Keat Hwa (H)
Kota Darul Aman (N13)	Kampung Perak	009/13/05	SJK (C) Keat Hwa (H)
Kota Darul Aman (N13)	Seberang Nyonya	009/13/06	Pusat Rukun Tetangga Kampung Berjaya, Alor Setar
Kota Darul Aman (N13)	Jalan Raja	009/13/07	SJK (C) Keat Hwa (S)
Kota Darul Aman (N13)	Jalan Kolam	009/13/08	SMK St Michael
Kota Darul Aman (N13)	Pengkalan	009/13/09	SJK (C) Keat Hwa (S)
Kota Darul Aman (N13)	Jalan Seberang Perak	009/13/10	SK Seberang Perak
Kota Darul Aman (N13)	Taman Bahagia	009/13/11	SM Keat Hwa (Persendirian)
Kota Darul Aman (N13)	Kota Tanah	009/13/12	SM Keat Hwa (Persendirian)
Kota Darul Aman (N13)	Kampung Piew	009/13/13	SK Sg Korok Lama
Kota Darul Aman (N13)	Jalan Pegawai	009/13/14	Maktab Mahmud Puteri
Kota Darul Aman (N13)	Sungai Korok	009/13/15	SK Jalan Pegawai
Kota Darul Aman (N13)	Kampung Telok	009/13/16	SJK (C) Sin Min
Kota Darul Aman (N13)	Bandar Simpang Kuala	009/13/17	Maktab Mahmud Alor Setar
Kota Darul Aman (N13)	Rumah Pangsa Simpang Kuala	009/13/18	SJK (C) Sin Min
Kota Darul Aman (N13)	Kampung Pegawai	009/13/19	Wisma Lung Kong
Kota Darul Aman (N13)	Jalan Stesyen	009/13/20	SMK St Michael
Kota Darul Aman (N13)	Taman Bee Bee	009/13/21	SJK (C) Peng Min
Kota Darul Aman (N13)	Tongkang Yard	009/13/22	SK Seberang Perak Baru
Alor Mengkudu (N14)	Kampung Gelam	009/14/01	SK Kampong Gelam
Alor Mengkudu (N14)	Alor Melintang	009/14/02	SK Alor Melintang
Alor Mengkudu (N14)	Titi Haji Idris	009/14/03	SK Hj Idris Tajar
Alor Mengkudu (N14)	Tok Sibil	009/14/04	SK Darul Hikmah
Alor Mengkudu (N14)	Alor Binjal	009/14/05	SMK Tajar
Alor Mengkudu (N14)	Tok Keling	009/14/06	SK Haji Wahab
Alor Mengkudu (N14)	Lahar Budi	009/14/07	SK Lahar Budi
Alor Mengkudu (N14)	Alor Mengkudu	009/14/08	SK Alor Mengkudu
Alor Mengkudu (N14)	Taman Saga	009/14/09	SMK Simpang Kuala
Alor Mengkudu (N14)	Taman Sultan Abdul Halim	009/14/10	SMK Convent
Alor Mengkudu (N14)	Jalan Langgar	009/14/11	Kolej Sultan Abdul Hamid
Alor Mengkudu (N14)	Kampung Tanjong Bendahara	009/14/12	SK Iskandar
Alor Mengkudu (N14)	Keriang Pulau	009/14/13	SM Teknik Alor Setar
Alor Mengkudu (N14)	Selarong	009/14/14	SMK Dato' Wan Mohd Saman
Alor Mengkudu (N14)	Tandop	009/14/15	SK Dato' Wan Mohd Saman

=== Representation history ===
Members of Parliament for Alor Setar
Parliament	No	Years	Member	Party	Vote Share
Constituency created
Alor Star
Federal Legislative Council
1st		1955–1959	Lee Thean Hin (李天兴)	Alliance (MCA)	27,897; 93.99%
Parliament of the Federation of Malaya
1st	P006	1959–1963	Lim Joo Kong (林如冈)	Alliance (MCA)	10,730; 62.28%
Parliament of Malaysia
1st	P006	1963–1964	Lim Joo Kong (林如冈)	Alliance (MCA)	10,730; 62.28%
2nd	P006	1964–1969	Lim Pee Hung (林维翰)	Alliance (MCA)	14,749; 64.69%
		1969–1971	Parliament was suspended		
3rd	P006	1971–1973	Lim Pee Hung (林维翰)	Alliance (MCA)	9,016; 36.33%
3rd	P006	1973–1974	Lim Pee Hung (林维翰)	BN (MCA)	9,016; 36.33%
Alor Setar
4th	P007	1974–1978	Oo Gin Sun (余银山)	BN (MCA)	13,420; 58.68%
5th	P007	1978–1982	Oo Gin Sun (余银山)	BN (MCA)	14,620; 43.74%
6th	P007	1982–1986	Oo Gin Sun (余银山)	BN (MCA)	21,908; 53.52%
7th	P007	1986–1990	Oo Gin Sun (余银山)	BN (MCA)	16,647; 47.38%
8th	P007	1990–1995	Chor Chee Heung (曹智雄)	BN (MCA)	22,714; 56.37%
Alor Star
9th	P009	1995–1999	Chor Chee Heung (曹智雄)	BN (MCA)	28,943; 71.96%
10th	P009	1999–2004	Chor Chee Heung (曹智雄)	BN (MCA)	27,847; 67.75%
11th	P009	2004–2008	Chor Chee Heung (曹智雄)	BN (MCA)	28,379; 67.18%
12th	P009	2008–2013	Chor Chee Heung (曹智雄)	BN (MCA)	20,741; 50.22%
13th	P009	2013–2015	Gooi Hsiao-Leung (魏晓隆)	PR (PKR)	27,364; 48.31%
13th	P009	2015–2018	Gooi Hsiao-Leung (魏晓隆)	PH (PKR)	27,364; 48.31%
Alor Setar
14th	P009	2018–2022	Chan Ming Kai (曾敏凯)	PH (PKR)	32,475; 50.80%
15th	P009	2022–present	Afnan Hamimi Taib Azamudden (أفنان هميمي طائب عزام الدين)	PN (PAS)	37,486; 48.69%

=== State constituency ===
Parliamentary constituency	State constituency						
Parliamentary constituency	1955–1959*	1959–1974	1974–1986	1986–1995	1995–2004	2004–2018	2018–present
Alor Setar							Alor Mengkudu
Alor Setar			Alor Merah				
Alor Setar			Bandar Alor Setar				
Alor Setar				Kota Darulaman			Kota Darul Aman
Alor Setar							Suka Menanti
Alor Star						Alor Mengkudu	
Alor Star					Alor Merah		
Alor Star		Alor Star Luar					
Alor Star		Alor Star Pekan					
Alor Star	Alor Star-Langkawi						
Alor Star						Bakar Bata	
Alor Star					Derga		
Alor Star					Kota Darul Aman		
Alor Star	Kota Star Timor-Padang						

=== Historical boundaries ===
State Constituency	Area					
State Constituency	1959	1974	1984	1994	2003	2018
Alor Mengkudu					Alor Binjal; Alor Melintang; Alor Mengkudu; Tajar; Titi Haji Idris	
Alor Merah		Alor Mengkudu; Derga; Kampung Hujung Ambar; Mergong; Taman Seri Belimbing	Anak Bukit; Derga; Mergong; Suka Menanti; Taman Kenyalang	Alor Merah; Kampung Batin; Mergong; Pumpong; Suka Menanti		
Alor Star Luar	Alor Mengkudu; Alor Merah; Anak Bukit; Kampung Tok Keling; Pumpong					
Alor Star Pekan	Kampung Pegawai; Kampung Piew; Simpang Kuala; Taman Manggis; Taman Seri Belimbing					
Bandar Alor Setar		Alor Setar; Kampung Pegawai; Kampung Piew; Simpang Kuala; Taman Teratai				
Bakar Bata					Alor Merah; Kampung Batin; Mergong; Pumpong; Suka Menanti	
Derga				Derga; Kampung Dato' Keramat; Kampung Hujung Ambar; Kampung Khatijah; Taman PKNK		
Kota Darul Aman			Alor Setar; Kampung Pegawai; Kampung Piew; Taman Manggis; Taman Sri Belimbing	Alor Setar; Kampung Pegawai; Kampung Piew; Simpang Kuala; Taman Manggis	Alor Setar; Kampung Pegawai; Kampung Piew; Kota Darul Aman; Simpang Kuala	Alor Semadom; Alor Setar; Kota Darul Aman; Taman Manggis; Taman Sri Aman
Suka Menanti						Alor Merah; Kampung Batin; Mergong; Pumpong; Suka Menanti

=== Current state assembly members ===
No.	State Constituency	Member	Coalition (Party)
N12	Suka Menanti	Dzowahir Ab Ghani	PN (WAWASAN)
N13	Kota Darul Aman	Teh Swee Leong	PH (DAP)
N14	Alor Mengkudu	Muhamad Radhi Mat Din	PN (PAS)

=== Local governments & postcodes ===
No.	State Constituency	Local Government	Postcode
N12	Suka Menanti	Alor Setar City Council	05000, 05050, 05100, 05150, 05200, 05250, 05300, 05350, 05400, 05500, 05502, 05503, 05506, 05520, 06650 Alor Setar
N13	Kota Darul Aman	Alor Setar City Council	05000, 05050, 05100, 05150, 05200, 05250, 05300, 05350, 05400, 05500, 05502, 05503, 05506, 05520, 06650 Alor Setar
N14	Alor Mengkudu	Alor Setar City Council	05000, 05050, 05100, 05150, 05200, 05250, 05300, 05350, 05400, 05500, 05502, 05503, 05506, 05520, 06650 Alor Setar

== Election results ==
Malaysian general election, 2022
Party	Candidate	Votes	%	∆%
PN	Afnan Hamimi Taib Azamudden	37,486	48.69	▲48.96
PH	Simon Ooi Tze Min	27,555	35.79	▲35.79
BN	Tan Chee Heong	8,930	11.60	▼10.58
PEJUANG	Mohamad Nuhairi Rahmat	2,383	3.10	▲3.10
Heritage	Fadzil Hanafi	366	0.48	▲0.48
Independent	Sofan Feroza Md Yusup	151	0.20	▲0.20
Independent	Nordin Yunus	115	0.15	▲0.15
Total valid votes		76,986	100.00	
Total rejected ballots		774		
Unreturned ballots		209		
Turnout		77,976	73.60	▼7.49
Registered electors		105,994		
Majority		9,931	12.90	▼10.88
PN gain from PKR		Swing		?
Source(s) https://lom.agc.gov.my/ilims/upload/portal/akta/outputp/1753260/PUB%20606%20(2022).pdf

Malaysian general election, 2018
Party	Candidate	Votes	%	∆%
PKR	Chan Ming Kai	32,475	50.80	▲2.49
PAS	Muhd Aminur Shafiq Mohd Abduh	17,275	27.02	▲27.02
BN	Yoo Wei How	14,181	22.18	▼22.83
Total valid votes		63,931	100.00	
Total rejected ballots		881		
Unreturned ballots		284		
Turnout		65,096	81.09	▼2.83
Registered electors		80,272		
Majority		15,200	23.78	▲20.48
PKR hold		Swing		
Source(s) "His Majesty's Government Gazette - Notice of Contested Election, Parliament for the State of Kedah [P.U. (B) 233/2018]" (PDF). Attorney General's Chambers of Malaysia. 3 May 2018. "Federal Government Gazette - Results of Contested Election and Statements of the Poll after the Official Addition of Votes, Parliamentary Constituencies for the State of Kedah [P.U. (B) 307/2018]" (PDF). Attorney General's Chambers of Malaysia. 28 May 2018.

Malaysian general election, 2013: Alor Star
Party	Candidate	Votes	%	∆%
PKR	Gooi Hsiao-Leung	27,364	48.31	▼1.47
BN	Chor Chee Heung	25,491	45.01	▼5.21
Pan-Malaysian Islamic Front	Abdul Fisol Mohd Isa	3,530	6.23	▲6.23
MUPP	Jawahar Raja Abdul Wahid	257	0.45	▲0.45
Total valid votes		56,642	100.00	
Total rejected ballots		1,070		
Unreturned ballots		200		
Turnout		57,912	83.92	▲10.64
Registered electors		69,009		
Majority		1,873	3.30	▲2.86
PKR gain from BN		Swing		?
Source(s) "Federal Government Gazette - Notice of Contested Election, Parliament for the State of Kedah [P.U. (B) 170/2013]" (PDF). Attorney General's Chambers of Malaysia. 26 April 2013. Archived from the original (PDF) on 29 December 2019. "Federal Government Gazette - Results of Contested Election and Statements of the Poll after the Official Addition of Votes, Parliamentary Constituencies for the State of Kedah [P.U. (B) 211/2013]" (PDF). Attorney General's Chambers of Malaysia. 22 May 2013.

Malaysian general election, 2008: Alor Star
Party	Candidate	Votes	%	∆%
BN	Chor Chee Heung	20,741	50.22	▼16.96
PKR	Gooi Hsiao-Leung	20,557	49.78	▲16.96
Total valid votes		41,298	100.00	
Total rejected ballots		1,757		
Unreturned ballots		151		
Turnout		43,206	73.28	▼2.20
Registered electors		58,957		
Majority		184	0.44	▼33.92
BN hold		Swing		

Malaysian general election, 2004: Alor Star
Party	Candidate	Votes	%	∆%
BN	Chor Chee Heung	28,379	67.18	▼0.57
PKR	Siti Nor Abdul Hamid	13,864	32.82	▲32.82
Total valid votes		42,243	100.00	
Total rejected ballots		828		
Unreturned ballots		186		
Turnout		43,257	75.48	▲7.11
Registered electors		57,309		
Majority		14,515	34.36	▼1.14
BN hold		Swing		

Malaysian general election, 1999: Alor Star
Party	Candidate	Votes	%	∆%
BN	Chor Chee Heung	27,847	67.75	▼4.21
DAP	George John K. M. George	13,258	32.25	▲32.25
Total valid votes		41,105	100.00	
Total rejected ballots		1,542		
Unreturned ballots		891		
Turnout		43,538	68.37	▲0.44
Registered electors		63,679		
Majority		14,589	35.50	▼8.42
BN hold		Swing		

Malaysian general election, 1995: Alor Star
Party	Candidate	Votes	%	∆%
BN	Chor Chee Heung	28,943	71.96	▲15.59
S46	Tunku Sofiah Tunku Md Jewa	11,278	28.04	▼15.59
Total valid votes		40,221	100.00	
Total rejected ballots		1,393		
Unreturned ballots		290		
Turnout		41,904	67.93	▼2.57
Registered electors		61,687		
Majority		17,665	43.92	▲31.18
BN hold		Swing		

Malaysian general election, 1990
Party	Candidate	Votes	%	∆%
BN	Chor Chee Heung	22,714	56.37	▲8.99
S46	Tengku Mohammad Farris Tengku Ahmad Rayan	17,579	43.63	▲43.63
Total valid votes		40,293	100.00	
Total rejected ballots		1,402		
Unreturned ballots		0		
Turnout		41,695	70.50	▲5.10
Registered electors		59,141		
Majority		5,135	12.74	▼8.47
BN hold		Swing		

Malaysian general election, 1986
Party	Candidate	Votes	%	∆%
BN	Oo Gin Sun	16,647	47.38	▼6.14
PAS	Suhaimi Ahmad	9,195	26.17	▲2.60
DAP	George John K. M. George	9,042	25.74	▲2.83
SDP	Mohd Noorik Abd Rahman	249	0.71	▲0.71
Total valid votes		35,133	100.00	
Total rejected ballots		710		
Unreturned ballots		0		
Turnout		35,843	65.40	▼6.02
Registered electors		54,803		
Majority		7,452	21.21	▼8.74
BN hold		Swing		

Malaysian general election, 1982
Party	Candidate	Votes	%	∆%
BN	Oo Gin Sun	21,908	53.52	▲9.78
PAS	Ahmad Awang	9,647	23.57	▼4.93
DAP	George John K. M. George	9,376	22.91	▲14.45
Total valid votes		40,931	100.00	
Total rejected ballots		818		
Unreturned ballots		0		
Turnout		41,749	71.42	▼1.07
Registered electors		58,456		
Majority		12,261	29.95	▲14.71
BN hold		Swing		

Malaysian general election, 1978
Party	Candidate	Votes	%	∆%
BN	Oo Gin Sun	14,620	43.74	▼14.94
PAS	Ramiee Karim	9,525	28.50	▲28.50
Independent	Chang Boon Hoe	6,453	19.31	▲19.31
DAP	C. Shanmugaiah	2,828	8.46	▼32.86
Total valid votes		33,426	100.00	
Total rejected ballots		900		
Unreturned ballots		0		
Turnout		34,326	72.49	▲11.25
Registered electors		47,355		
Majority		5,095	15.24	▼2.12
BN hold		Swing		

Malaysian general election, 1974
Party	Candidate	Votes	%	∆%
BN	Oo Gin Sun	13,420	58.68	▲58.68
DAP	Karpal Singh Ram Singh	9,450	41.32	▲41.32
Total valid votes		22,870	100.00	
Total rejected ballots		1,069		
Unreturned ballots		0		
Turnout		23,939	61.24	▼4.50
Registered electors		39,088		
Majority		3,970	17.36	▲15.45
BN hold		Swing		

Malaysian general election, 1969: Alor Star
Party	Candidate	Votes	%	∆%
Alliance	Lim Pee Hung	9,016	36.33	▼28.16
GERAKAN	Geh Teng Kheng	8,543	34.42	▲34.42
PMIP	Haron Omar	7,258	29.25	▲13.42
Total valid votes		24,817	100.00	
Total rejected ballots		579		
Unreturned ballots		0		
Turnout		25,396	65.74	▼4.07
Registered electors		38,631		
Majority		473	1.91	▼46.95
Alliance hold		Swing		

Malaysian general election, 1964: Alor Star
Party	Candidate	Votes	%	∆%
Alliance	Lim Pee Hung	14,749	64.69	▲2.21
PMIP	Syed Salim Syed Hamid Al-Idrus	3,608	15.83	▼8.61
UDP	Geh Teng Kheng	2,695	11.82	▲11.82
Socialist Front	Teoh Ah Thow	1,747	7.66	▼5.62
Total valid votes		22,799	100.00	
Total rejected ballots		767		
Unreturned ballots		0		
Turnout		23,566	69.81	▲1.78
Registered electors		33,758		
Majority		11,141	48.86	▲11.02
Alliance hold		Swing		

Malayan general election, 1959: Alor Star
Party	Candidate	Votes	%	∆%
Alliance	Lim Joo Kong	10,730	62.28	▼31.71
PMIP	Abdul Malik Abdul Rahman	4,212	24.44	▲24.44
Socialist Front	Teoh Ah Thow	2,289	13.28	▲13.28
Total valid votes		17,231	100.00	
Total rejected ballots		144		
Unreturned ballots		0		
Turnout		17,375	68.03	▼16.17
Registered electors		25,540		
Majority		6,518	37.84	▼50.14
Alliance hold		Swing		

Malayan general election, 1955: Alor Star
Party	Candidate	Votes	%
Alliance	Lee Thean Hin	27,897	93.99
NEGARA	Salim Mohd Rejab	1,784	6.01
Total valid votes		29,681	100.00
Total rejected ballots			
Unreturned ballots			
Turnout		29,681	84.20
Registered electors		35,251	
Majority		26,113	87.98
This was a new constituency created.
Source(s): The Straits Times.
