= Teng Boon Soon =

Malaysian politician

Teng Boon Soon AMN
- 邓文村

Deputy Minister of National Unity, Arts, Culture and Heritage
- In office 19 March 2008 – 9 April 2009
- Monarch: Mizan Zainal Abidin
- Prime Minister: Abdullah Ahmad Badawi
- Minister: Shafie Apdal
- Preceded by: Wong Kam Hoong (Arts, Culture and Heritage)
- Succeeded by: Vacant
- Constituency: Tebrau

Member of the Malaysian Parliament for Tebrau
- In office 21 March 2004 – 5 May 2013
- Preceded by: Ali Hassan (BN–UMNO)
- Succeeded by: Khoo Soo Seang (BN–MCA)
- Majority: 26,011 (2004); 14,851 (2008)

Personal details
- Born: Ling Ban San @ Teng Boon Soon; 30 August 1941 (age 84) Johor, British Malaya (now Malaysia)
- Party: Malaysian Chinese Association (MCA)
- Other political affiliations: Barisan Nasional (BN)
- Occupation: Politician
- Website: mptebrau.blogspot.com

Chinese name
- Traditional Chinese: 鄧文村
- Simplified Chinese: 邓文村
- Hanyu Pinyin: Dèng Wéncūn
- Hokkien POJ: Tēng Bûn-chhûn

Teng Boon Soon (simplified Chinese: 邓文村; traditional Chinese: 鄧文村; born 30 August 1941) is a Malaysian politician who served as the Deputy Minister of National Unity, Arts, Culture and Heritage in the Barisan Nasional (BN) administration under former Prime Minister Abdullah Ahmad Badawi and former Minister Shafie Apdal from March 2008 to April 2009 and Member of Parliament (MP) Tebrau from March 2004 to May 2013. He is a member of the Malaysian Chinese Association (MCA), a component party of the BN coalition. He is the uncle of Teng Chang Khim, former Senior Member of the Selangor State Executive Council (EXCO) of the Democratic Action Party (DAP) and his younger brother Teng Chang Yeow, former Member of the Penang State Legislative Assembly (MLA) for Padang Kota formerly of the Parti Gerakan Rakyat Malaysia (GERAKAN).

Teng was elected to federal Parliament in the 2004 general elections, succeeding United Malays National Organisation (UMNO) member Mohd Ali Hassan in the seat of Tebrau. After the 2008 general election, he was appointed Deputy Minister for Unity, Culture, Arts and Heritage by Prime Minister Abdullah Badawi. His ministerial post came under threat in November 2008 after he was defeated for a position on the MCA's Central Committee, and he was subsequently left out of the ministry named by incoming Prime Minister Najib Razak in April 2009. His parliamentary career was also ended in 2013, when Khoo Soo Seang replaced him as the MCA's candidate and won the Tebrau seat in the 2013 general election.

== Election results ==
Parliament of Malaysia
| Year | Constituency | Government | Votes | Pct | Opposition | Votes | Pct | Ballots cast | Majority | Turnout |
|---|---|---|---|---|---|---|---|---|---|---|
| 2004 | P158 Tebrau | Teng Boon Soon (MCA) | 32,071 | 84.11% | Ya'akob Mohd Yusof (PAS) | 6,060 | 15.89% | 39,261 | 26,011 | 74.58% |
| 2008 | P158 Tebrau | Teng Boon Soon (MCA) | 30,860 | 65.77% | Roslani Sharif (PAS) | 16,202 | 34.23% | 48,700 | 14,851 | 77.91% |

== Honours ==
- Malaysia
  - Member of the Order of the Defender of the Realm (AMN) (1998)
