= Azizul Bachok =

Malaysian politician

- ازيزول باچهوق

Member of the Johor State Legislative Assembly for Tiram
- In office 12 March 2022 – 11 July 2026
- Preceded by: Gopalakrishnan Subramaniam
- Succeeded by: Abdul Halim Suleiman

Personal details
- Born: Azizul bin Bachok
- Citizenship: Malaysian
- Party: UMNO
- Other political affiliations: Barisan Nasional
- Occupation: Politician

Azizul bin Bachok is a Malaysian politician from UMNO. He has served as the Member of the Johor State Legislative Assembly for Tiram since 2022. He is also the Deputy Chief of UMNO Tebrau division.

== Election results ==
Johor State Legislative Assembly
Year	Constituency	Candidate	Votes	Pct.	Opponent(s)	Votes	Pct.	Ballots cast	Majority	Turnout
2022	N40 Tiram	Azizul Bachok (UMNO)	22,939	39.59%	Karim Deraman (PAS)	17,658	30.48%	57,938	5,281	54.81%
2022	N40 Tiram	Azizul Bachok (UMNO)	22,939	39.59%	Gopalakrishnan Subramaniam (PKR)	12,550	21.66%	57,938	5,281	54.81%
2022	N40 Tiram	Azizul Bachok (UMNO)	22,939	39.59%	Abdul Aziz Harun (PEJUANG)	1,391	2.40%	57,938	5,281	54.81%
2022	N40 Tiram	Azizul Bachok (UMNO)	22,939	39.59%	Mohd Azmi Ali (PBM)	860	1.48%	57,938	5,281	54.81%
2022	N40 Tiram	Azizul Bachok (UMNO)	22,939	39.59%	Jayasangkar Jeraman (IND)	654	1.13%	57,938	5,281	54.81%
2022	N40 Tiram	Azizul Bachok (UMNO)	22,939	39.59%	Bala Sundaram Perumal (IND)	365	0.63%	57,938	5,281	54.81%
