= Gooi Hsiao Leung =

Member of the Penang State Legislative Assembly

Yang Berhormat Tuan Gooi Hsiao Leung MLA
- 魏晓隆

Member of the Penang State Legislative Assembly for Bukit Tengah
- Incumbent
- Assumed office 9 May 2018
- Preceded by: Ong Chin Wen (PR–PKR)
- Majority: 8,558 (2018); 8,697 (2023)

Member of the Malaysian Parliament for Alor Setar
- In office 5 May 2013 – 9 May 2018
- Preceded by: Chor Chee Heung (BN–MCA)
- Succeeded by: Chan Ming Kai (PH–PKR)
- Majority: 1,873 (2013)

Faction represented in Penang State Legislative Assembly
- 2018–: Pakatan Harapan

Faction represented in Dewan Rakyat
- 2013–2018: People's Justice Party

Personal details
- Born: Gooi Hsiao Leung; 28 December 1972 (age 53) Penang, Malaysia
- Citizenship: Malaysian
- Party: People's Justice Party (PKR)
- Other political affiliations: Pakatan Rakyat (PR) (2008–2015); Pakatan Harapan (PH) (since 2015)
- Parent: Gooi Hock Seng
- Occupation: Politician
- Profession: Lawyer
- Website: gooihsiaoleung.com

Gooi Hsiao Leung

Chinese name
- Traditional Chinese: 魏曉隆
- Hanyu Pinyin: Wèi Xiǎolóng
- Jyutping: Ngai6 Hiu2 Lung4
- Hokkien POJ: Gūi Hiáu-liông
- Tâi-lô: Guī Hiáu-liông

Gooi Hsiao Leung (simplified Chinese: 魏晓隆; traditional Chinese: 魏曉隆; pinyin: Wèi Xiǎolóng; Jyutping: Ngai6 Hiu2 Lung4; Pe̍h-ōe-jī: Gūi Hiáu-liông; born 28 December 1972) is a Malaysian politician and lawyer who has served as Member of the Penang State Legislative Assembly (MLA) for Bukit Tengah since May 2018. He served as the Member of Parliament (MP) for Alor Star from May 2013 to May 2018. He is a member of the People's Justice Party (PKR), a component party of the Pakatan Harapan (PH) and formerly Pakatan Rakyat (PR) coalitions.

From a young age, Gooi accompanied his father, Gooi Hock Seng, former DAP Member of Parliament and State Assemblyman, during election campaigns in the 1980s and 1990s. He has stated an interest in political reform, including issues such as equality, governance and democratic processes in Malaysia.

Before his political career, Gooi pursued his passion for human rights defending clients both locally and overseas, where he worked for the United Nations at the Special Panels and Serious Crimes Unit in East Timor.

A lawyer by profession, Gooi contested the Alor Setar parliamentary seat at the 2008 general election, but lost to the seat's long-serving incumbent, Chor Chee Heung of the Malaysian Chinese Association (MCA), by 184 votes. He recontested the seat in the 2013 general election. Amid a nationwide swing away from Barisan Nasional coalition parties, such as the MCA, in urban areas, Gooi unseated Chor by 1,873 votes.

In the 2018 general election, Gooi contested the Bukit Tengah state seat of the Penang State Legislative Assembly instead and won it in a five-corner fight.

== Election results ==
Parliament of Malaysia
Year	Constituency	Candidate	Votes	Pct	Opponent(s)	Votes	Pct	Ballots cast	Majority	Turnout
2008	P009 Alor Star	Gooi Hsiao Leung (PKR)	20,557	47.58%	Chor Chee Heung (MCA)	20,741	48.00%	43,206	184	73.28%
2013	P009 Alor Star	Gooi Hsiao Leung (PKR)	27,364	47.25%	Chor Chee Heung (MCA)	25,491	43.86%	57,912	1,873	83.92%
2013	P009 Alor Star	Gooi Hsiao Leung (PKR)	27,364	47.25%	Abdul Fisol Mohd Isa (BERJASA)	3,530	6.23%	57,912	1,873	83.92%
2013	P009 Alor Star	Gooi Hsiao Leung (PKR)	27,364	47.25%	Jawahar Raja Abdul Wahid (BERSAMA)	257	0.45%	57,912	1,873	83.92%

Penang State Legislative Assembly
Year	Constituency	Candidate	Votes	Pct	Opponent(s)	Votes	Pct	Ballots cast	Majority	Turnout
2018	N17 Bukit Tengah	Gooi Hsiao Leung (PKR)	12,535	66.20%	Thor Teong Gee (Gerakan)	3,977	21.00%	19,192	8,558	86.20%
2018	N17 Bukit Tengah	Gooi Hsiao Leung (PKR)	12,535	66.20%	Norazman Ishak (PAS)	2,355	12.40%	19,192	8,558	86.20%
2018	N17 Bukit Tengah	Gooi Hsiao Leung (PKR)	12,535	66.20%	Tan Hiang Lye (PRM)	53	0.30%	19,192	8,558	86.20%
2018	N17 Bukit Tengah	Gooi Hsiao Leung (PKR)	12,535	66.20%	Edward Joseph (PFP)	27	0.10%	19,192	8,558	86.20%
2023	N17 Bukit Tengah	Gooi Hsiao Leung (PKR)	16,050	68.58%	Baljit Singh Jigiri Singh (Gerakan)	7,353	31.42%	23,403	8,697	73.98%
