= Teng Chang Yeow =

Malaysian politician

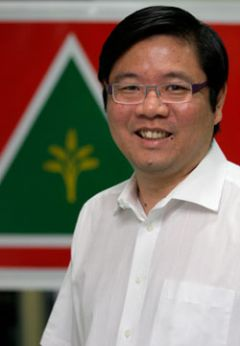

Member of the Penang State Executive Council
- In office 31 March 2004 – 2008
- Governor: Abdul Rahman Abbas
- Chief Minister: Koh Tsu Koon
- Portfolio: Tourism Development and Environment
- Preceded by: Kee Phaik Cheen (Tourism); Teng Hock Nan (Environment)
- Succeeded by: Law Heng Kiang (Tourism Development); Chow Kon Yeow (Environment)
- Constituency: Padang Kota

Member of the Penang State Legislative Assembly for Padang Kota
- In office 25 April 1995 – 8 March 2008
- Preceded by: Lim Kit Siang (GR–DAP)
- Succeeded by: Chow Kon Yeow (PR–DAP)
- Majority: 2,560 (1995); 1,640 (1999); 2,254 (2004)

Personal details
- Born: 12 December 1964 (age 61) Batu Pahat, Johor Malaysia
- Citizenship: Malaysian
- Party: Parti Gerakan Rakyat Malaysia (GERAKAN) (until 2021); Independent (since 2021)
- Other political affiliations: Barisan Nasional (BN) (until 2018); Perikatan Nasional (PN) (2020–2021)
- Parent: Teng Boon Ngap (father)
- Relatives: Teng Boon Soon (uncle); Teng Chang Khim (elder brother)
- Education: Universiti Sains Malaysia
- Occupation: Politician

Teng Chang Yeow (Chinese: 鄧章耀; Pe̍h-ōe-jī: Tēng Chiong-iāu; born 12 December 1964) is a former Malaysian politician who served as the Member of the Penang State Legislative Assembly for Padang Kota from 1995 to 2008. He was also the former Secretary-General of the Parti Gerakan Rakyat Malaysia (GERAKAN), as well as the former Barisan Nasional (BN) Penang Chief.

== Early life and education ==
He is a younger brother to Teng Chang Khim, the former Speaker of the Selangor State Legislative Assembly and a Selangor State Executive Council member. Unlike Teng Chang Yeow himself, Teng Chang Khim is a member of the Democratic Action Party (DAP), a major component of the Pakatan Harapan (PH) coalition. Nevertheless, both are sons of Teng Boon Ngap, who was a prominent member of the Malaysian Chinese Association (MCA) before the 1980s. They are also nephews to the former Tebrau MP Teng Boon Soon.

Prior to joining politics, Teng studied at Universiti Sains Malaysia (USM), and worked as a political secretary to the former Chief Minister of Penang Koh Tsu Koon. He served as a municipal councillor from 1992 to 1995.

== Political career ==
Teng was firstly elected to the Penang State Legislative Assembly for Padang Kota at the 1995 election, defeating Karpal Singh. He was kept elected in 1999. Becoming Penang Chief Minister's political secretary. He was reelected in 2004 and appointed as Penang State Executive Councillor (Tourism Development and Environment), but lost to Chow Kon Yeow (who later became the Chief Minister of Penang in 2018) in 2008. Before he lost, he was one of the potential CM candidate that could succeed Koh Tsu Koon.

On 22 April 2012, Teng became the Barisan Nasional (BN) Penang Chief, replacing Koh. In the 2013 election, he contested for Bukit Tengah, but was defeated by Ong Chin Wen from the People's Justice Party (PKR). Following the 2013 election, he contested for the Parti Gerakan Rakyat Malaysia (GERAKAN) leadership election, but lost to Mah Siew Keong.

In the 2018 election, Teng was announced as the BN candidate for Tanjong Bunga, who fought against the PH unity candidate Zairil Khir Johari. He also previously assured that this would be the last election he contests. He, however, only obtained 3,902 votes and came far behind of Zairil.

The outcome of the election showed the worst result of the BN in the state, with just retaining 2 out of 40 seats in the state. The 2 were from the United Malays National Organisation (UMNO); no MCA or GERAKAN candidates were elected. The BN also lost its ruling party status since the country's independence in 1957. Chow Kon Yeow, whom Teng defeated him for 2 times before, inaugurated as the new Chief Minister of Penang.

== Retirement ==
After he was defeated in the 2018 Penang state election, Teng made an announcement to resign all positions he was holding, as well as retiring from politics.

== Election results ==
Penang State Legislative Assembly
Year	Constituency	Candidate	Votes	Pct	Opponent(s)	Votes	Pct	Ballots cast	Majority	Turnout
1995	N22 Padang Kota	Teng Chang Yeow (Gerakan)	7,939	58.29%	Karpal Singh Ram Singh (DAP)	5,737	42.12%		2,560	72.38%
1999	N22 Padang Kota	Teng Chang Yeow (Gerakan)	6,851	40.88%	Chow Kon Yeow (DAP)	5,211	31.10%	16,758	1,640	77.01%
2004	N26 Padang Kota	Teng Chang Yeow (Gerakan)	6,838	59.87%	Chow Kon Yeow (DAP)	4,584	40.13%	11,655	2,254	63.66%
2008	N26 Padang Kota	Teng Chang Yeow (Gerakan)	4,788	42.42%	Chow Kon Yeow (DAP)	6,449	57.14%	11,507	1,661	68.89%
2013	N17 Bukit Tengah	Teng Chang Yeow (Gerakan)	5,540	33.67%	Ong Chin Wen (PKR)	10,730	65.22%	16,722	5,190	88.30%
2013	N17 Bukit Tengah	Teng Chang Yeow (Gerakan)	5,540	33.67%	Mohan Apparoo (IND)	182	1.10%	16,722	5,190	88.30%
2018	N22 Tanjong Bunga	Teng Chang Yeow (Gerakan)	3,902	22.50%	Zairil Khir Johari (DAP)	13,245	76.37%	17,571	9,343	80.72%
2018	N22 Tanjong Bunga	Teng Chang Yeow (Gerakan)	3,902	22.50%	Chua Cheong Wee (PRM)	122	0.70%	17,571	9,343	80.72%
2018	N22 Tanjong Bunga	Teng Chang Yeow (Gerakan)	3,902	22.50%	Lee Zheng Yong (MUP)	74	0.43%	17,571	9,343	80.72%
