= Chor Chee Heung =

Malaysian politician and lawyer

Yang Berbahagia Tan Sri Dato' Seri Chor Chee Heung PSM DPMP SPSK SSDK SSAP DGSM DGMK DPMK DMSM DSDK AMK JP
- 曹智雄

Minister of Housing and Local Government
- In office 4 June 2010 – 15 May 2013
- Monarchs: Mizan Zainal Abidin (2010–2011); Abdul Halim (2011–2013)
- Prime Minister: Najib Razak
- Deputy: Lajim Ukin (2009–2012)
- Preceded by: Kong Cho Ha
- Succeeded by: Abdul Rahman Dahlan (Minister of Urban Wellbeing, Housing and Local Government)
- Constituency: Alor Setar

Deputy Minister of Finance II
- In office 10 April 2009 – 4 June 2010 Serving with Awang Adek Hussin (Deputy Minister of Finance I)
- Monarch: Mizan Zainal Abidin
- Prime Minister: Najib Razak
- Minister: Najib Razak (Minister of Finance I); Ahmad Husni Hanadzlah (Minister of Finance II)
- Preceded by: Kong Cho Ha
- Succeeded by: Donald Lim Siang Chai
- Constituency: Alor Setar

Deputy Minister of Home Affairs II
- In office 19 March 2008 – 9 April 2009 Serving with Wan Ahmad Farid Wan Salleh (Deputy Minister of Home Affairs I)
- Monarch: Mizan Zainal Abidin
- Prime Minister: Abdullah Ahmad Badawi
- Minister: Syed Hamid Albar
- Preceded by: Tan Chai Ho
- Succeeded by: Jelaing Mersat
- Constituency: Alor Setar

Parliamentary Secretary of the Ministry of Transport
- In office 1995–1999
- Monarchs: Ja'afar (1995–26 April 1999); Salahuddin (1999)
- Prime Minister: Mahathir Mohamad
- Minister: Ling Liong Sik
- Deputy Minister: Mohd Ali Rustam (1995–1996); Ibrahim Saad (1996–1999)
- Preceded by: Mohamed Ujang
- Succeeded by: Donald Lim Siang Chai
- Constituency: Alor Setar

Member of the Malaysian Parliament for Alor Setar
- In office 21 October 1990 – 5 May 2013
- Preceded by: Oo Gin Sun (BN–MCA)
- Succeeded by: Gooi Hsiao-Leung (PR–PKR)
- Majority: 5,135 (1990); 17,665 (1995); 14,589 (1999); 14,515 (2004); 184 (2008)

Faction represented in Dewan Rakyat
- 1990–2013: Barisan Nasional

Personal details
- Born: Chor Chee Heung; 15 March 1955 (age 71) Alor Setar, Kedah, Federation of Malaya (now Malaysia)
- Citizenship: Malaysian
- Party: Malaysian Chinese Association (MCA)
- Other political affiliations: Barisan Nasional (BN)
- Spouse: Cheong Guek Mee
- Children: 3
- Education: City, University of London (Master in Business Law)
- Occupation: Politician
- Profession: Lawyer

Chor Chee Heung

Chinese name
- Traditional Chinese: 曹智雄
- Hanyu Pinyin: Cáo Zhìxióng
- Yale Romanization: Chòuh Ji-hùhng
- Jyutping: Cou4 Zi3 Hung4
- Hokkien POJ: Chô Tì-hiông
- Tâi-lô: Tsô Tì-hiông

Chor Chee Heung (Chinese: 曹智雄; pinyin: Cáo Zhìxióng; Jyutping: Cou4 Zi3 Hung4; Cantonese Yale: Chòuh Ji-hùhng; Pe̍h-ōe-jī: Chô Tì-hiông; born 15 March 1955) is a Malaysian politician and lawyer who served as the Minister of Housing and Local Government from June 2010 to May 2013, Deputy Minister of Finance II from April 2009 to June 2010, Deputy Minister of Home Affairs II from March 2008 to April 2009, Parliamentary Secretary of the Ministry of Transport from 1995 to 1999 in the Barisan Nasional (BN) administration under former Prime Ministers Mahathir Mohamad, Abdullah Ahmad Badawi and Najib Razak and former Ministers Najib, Ahmad Husni Hanadzlah, Syed Hamid Albar and Ling Liong Sik as well as the Member of Parliament (MP) for Alor Setar from October 1990 to May 2013. He is a member of the Malaysian Chinese Association (MCA), a component party of the BN coalition.

Chor was elected to the Alor Setar constituency in 1990. He retained the seat in the 2008 election by 184 votes, before being defeated in the 2013 election. In June 2010, he was promoted to Minister of Housing and Local Government. He had previously been a Deputy Minister, and had served in various Parliamentary Secretary and Deputy Minister positions since 1995.

Chor was a MCA Vice President.

== Personal life ==
Chor was born in Alor Setar. Before entering politics, he was a lawyer. He is married with 3 children.

== Election results ==
Parliament of Malaysia
Year	Constituency	Candidate	Votes	Pct	Opponent(s)	Votes	Pct	Ballots cast	Majority	Turnout
1990	P007 Alor Setar	Chor Chee Heung (MCA)	22,714	54.48%	Tengku Mohammad Farris (S46)	17,579	42.16%	41,695	5,135	70.50
1995	P009 Alor Star	Chor Chee Heung (MCA)	28,943	69.07%	Tunku Sofia Md Jewa (S46)	11,278	26.91%	41,904	17,665	67.93%
1999	P009 Alor Star	Chor Chee Heung (MCA)	27,847	63.96%	George John K. M. George (DAP)	13,258	30.45%	43,538	14,589	68.37%
2004	P009 Alor Star	Chor Chee Heung (MCA)	28,379	65.61%	Siti Nor Abdul Hamid (PKR)	13,864	32.05%	43,257	14,515	75.48%
2008	P009 Alor Star	Chor Chee Heung (MCA)	20,741	48.00%	Gooi Hsiao Leung (PKR)	20,557	47.58%	43,206	184	73.28%
2013	P009 Alor Star	Chor Chee Heung (MCA)	25,401	43.86%	Gooi Hsiao Leung (PKR)	27,364	47.25%	57,912	1,873	83.92%
2013	P009 Alor Star	Chor Chee Heung (MCA)	25,401	43.86%	Abdul Fisol Mohd Isa (BERJASA)	3,530	6.23%	57,912	1,873	83.92%
2013	P009 Alor Star	Chor Chee Heung (MCA)	25,401	43.86%	Jawahar Raja Abdul Wahid (BERSAMA)	257	0.45%	57,912	1,873	83.92%

== Honours ==
=== Honours of Malaysia ===
- Malaysia
  - Commander of the Order of Loyalty to the Crown of Malaysia (PSM) – Tan Sri (2014)
- Kedah
  - Knight Grand Companion of the Order of Loyalty to the Royal House of Kedah (SSDK) – Dato' Seri (2012)
  - Knight Commander of the Glorious Order of the Crown of Kedah (DGMK) – Dato' Wira (2008)
  - Knight Companion of the Order of Loyalty to the Royal House of Kedah (DSDK) – Dato' (1998)
  - Member of the Order of the Crown of Kedah (AMK)
  - Justice of the Peace of Kedah (JP) (1992)
- Kelantan
  - Knight Grand Commander of the Order of the Loyalty to the Crown of Kelantan (SPSK) – Dato' (2009)
  - Knight Commander of the Order of the Crown of Kelantan (DPMK) – Dato' (2003)
- Malacca
  - Grand Commander of the Exalted Order of Malacca (DGSM) – Datuk Seri (2011)
  - Companion Class I of the Exalted Order of Malacca (DMSM) – Datuk (2002)
- Pahang
  - Grand Knight of the Order of Sultan Ahmad Shah of Pahang (SSAP) – Dato' Sri (2011)
- Perlis
  - Knight Commander of the Order of the Crown of Perlis (DPMP) – Dato' (2004)
