= Ong Chin Wen =

Malaysian politician

- 王敬文

Member of the Penang State Legislative Assembly for Bukit Tengah
- In office 8 March 2008 – 9 May 2018
- Preceded by: Ng Siew Lai (BN–Gerakan)
- Succeeded by: Gooi Hsiao Leung (PH–PKR)
- Majority: 1,904 (2008); 5,190 (2013)

Personal details
- Party: People's Justice Party (PKR) (–2022); WARISAN (since 2022)
- Other political affiliations: Pakatan Rakyat (PR) (2008–2015); Pakatan Harapan (PH) (2015–2022)
- Occupation: Politician

Ong Chin Wen is a Malaysian politician who served as Member of Penang State Legislative Assembly (MLA) for Bukit Tengah from March 2008 to May 2018. He is a member of Sabah Heritage Party (WARISAN) and was a member of People's Justice Party (PKR), a component party of Pakatan Harapan (PH).

== Election results ==
Penang State Legislative Assembly
Year	Constituency	Candidate	Votes	Pct	Opponent(s)	Votes	Pct	Ballots cast	Majority	Turnout
2008	N17 Bukit Tengah	Ong Chin Wen (PKR)	6,736	58.23%	Ng Siew Lai (Gerakan)	4,832	41.77%	11,835	1,904	78.90%
2013	N17 Bukit Tengah	Ong Chin Wen (PKR)	10,730	65.22%	Teng Chang Yeow (Gerakan)	5,540	33.67%	16,722	5,190	88.30%
2013	N17 Bukit Tengah	Ong Chin Wen (PKR)	10,730	65.22%	Mohan Apparoo (IND)	182	1.10%	16,722	5,190	88.30%

Penang State Legislative Assembly
Year	Constituency	Candidate	Votes	Pct	Opponent(s)	Votes	Pct	Ballots cast	Majority	Turnout
2022	P046 Batu Kawan	Ong Chin Wen (WARISAN)	450	0.65%	Chow Kon Yeow (DAP)	50,744	73.72%	88,812	40,400	77.50%
2022	P046 Batu Kawan	Ong Chin Wen (WARISAN)	450	0.65%	Wong Chia Zhen (Gerakan)	10,344	15.03%	88,812	40,400	77.50%
2022	P046 Batu Kawan	Ong Chin Wen (WARISAN)	450	0.65%	Tan Lee Huat (MCA)	7,145	10.38%	88,812	40,400	77.50%
2022	P046 Batu Kawan	Ong Chin Wen (WARISAN)	450	0.65%	Lee Ah Liang (PRM)	148	0.22%	88,812	40,400	77.50%
