= Khoo Soo Seang =

Malaysian politician and teacher

Yang Berbahagia Datuk Khoo Soo Seang PJN AMN
- 邱思祥

Member of the Malaysian Parliament for Tebrau
- In office 5 May 2013 – 9 May 2018
- Preceded by: Teng Boon Soon (BN–MCA)
- Succeeded by: Choong Shiau Yoon (PH–PKR)
- Majority: 1,767 (2013)

Personal details
- Born: Khoo Soo Seang; 21 April 1945 (age 80) Penang, Malaysia
- Party: Malaysian Chinese Association (MCA)
- Other political affiliations: Barisan Nasional (BN)
- Occupation: Politician
- Profession: Teacher

Khoo Soo Seang (Chinese: 邱思祥) is a Malaysian politician and teacher who served as the Member of Parliament (MP) for Tebrau from May 2013 to May 2018. He is a member of the Malaysian Chinese Association (MCA), a component party of the Barisan Nasional (BN) coalition.

== Politic career ==
Khoo was the Member of Parliament for Tebrau constituency, in Johor for one term from 2013 to 2018.

Khoo was elected during the 2013 general elections, when he defeated People's Justice Party (PKR) candidate Choong Shiau Yoon with a majority of 1,767 votes. Khoo earned 39,985 votes compared to his opponent with only 38,218 votes.

In the 2018 general elections, Khoo do not seek re-election for the Tebrau constituency which was contested by MCA's vice-president Dr. Hou Kok Chung instead as BN candidate.

== Election results ==
Parliament of Malaysia
Year	Constituency	Candidate	Votes	Pct	Opponent(s)	Votes	Pct	Ballots cast	Majority	Turnout
2013	P158 Tebrau	Khoo Soo Seang (MCA)	39,985	51.13%	Choong Shiau Yoon (PKR)	38,218	48.87%	79,835	1,767	88.23%

== Honours ==
- Malaysia
  - Commander of the Order of Meritorious Service (PJN) – Datuk (2017)
  - Member of the Order of the Defender of the Realm (AMN) (2005)
