= Bukit Batu (state constituency) =

Political subdivision in Malaysia

Bukit Batu (N51)
Johor constituency

State constituency
- Legislature: Johor State Legislative Assembly
MLA
Kumaran Ramakrishnan
BN
- Constituency created: 2003
- First contested: 2004
- Last contested: 2026

Demographics
- Population (2020): 81,646
- Electors (2026): 49,963
- Area (km²): 326

Bukit Batu is a state constituency in Johor, Malaysia, that is represented in the Johor State Legislative Assembly.

The state constituency was first contested in 2004 and is mandated to return a single Assemblyman to the Johor State Legislative Assembly under the first-past-the-post voting system.

== Demographics ==
As of 2020, Bukit Batu has a population of 81,646 people.

Ethnic breakdown of Bukit Batu's electorate as of 2026
1. Chinese (52.2%)
2. Malay (37.8%)
3. Indian (8.50%)
4. Other ethnicities (1.60%)

== History ==
=== Polling districts ===
According to the gazette issued on 2 July 2026, the Bukit Batu constituency has a total of 15 polling districts.

State constituency	Polling District	Code	Location
Bukit Batu (N51)	Ulu Choh	163/51/01	Dewan Raya Ulu Choh
Bukit Batu (N51)	Bandar Ulu Choh	163/51/02	SJK (C) Ching Yeh
Bukit Batu (N51)	Kampong Rahmat	163/51/03	SK Polis Kem
Bukit Batu (N51)	Bukit Batu	163/51/04	SJK (C) Batu
Bukit Batu (N51)	Ayer Manis	163/51/05	SK Ayer Manis
Bukit Batu (N51)	FELDA Bukit Batu	163/51/06	SK LKTP Bukit Batu
Bukit Batu (N51)	Ayer Bemban	163/51/07	SJK (C) Bemban
Bukit Batu (N51)	Midland Kulai Young	163/51/08	SK Sri Gunung Pulai
Bukit Batu (N51)	Pekan Kelapa Sawit Barat	163/51/09	Sekolah Agama Batu 26
Bukit Batu (N51)	Pekan Kelapa Sawit Tengah	163/51/10	SJK (C) Sawit
Bukit Batu (N51)	Pekan Kelapa Sawit Timor	163/51/11	Tadika Sawit
Bukit Batu (N51)	Kampong Sri Raya	163/51/12	SJK (T) Ladang Kulai Oil Palm
Bukit Batu (N51)	Kota Kulai	163/51/13	SJK (C) Kulai Besar
Bukit Batu (N51)	Taman Putri	163/51/14	SMK Taman Putri
Bukit Batu (N51)	Taman Permai	163/51/15	SMK Kota Kulai

=== Representation history ===
Members of the Legislative Assembly for Bukit Batu
Assembly	No	Years	Member	Party
Constituency split from Kulai
11th	N51	2004–2008	Cheong Chin Liang (张震亮)	BN (GERAKAN)
12th	N51	2008–2013	Cheong Chin Liang (张震亮)	BN (GERAKAN)
13th	N51	2013–2018	Jimmy Puah Wee Tse (潘伟斯)	PR (PKR)
14th	N51	2018–2022	Jimmy Puah Wee Tse (潘伟斯)	PH (PKR)
15th	N51	2022–2026	Arthur Chiong Sen Sern (张善深)	PH (PKR)
16th	N51	2026–present	Kumaran Ramakrishnan	BN (MIC)

== Election results ==
Johor state election, 2026
Party	Candidate	Votes	%	∆%
BN	Kumaran Ramakrishnan	16,899	47.70	▲9.07
PH	Arthur Chiong Sen Sern	16,725	47.20	▲47.20
BERSAMA	Tamili Gopalakrishnan	821	2.32	▲2.32
Independent	Kamaruzaman Ali	599	1.69	▲1.69
MUDA	Premanand Maniam	387	1.09	▲1.09
Total valid votes		35,431	100.00	
Total rejected ballots		441		
Unreturned ballots		16		
Turnout		35,888	71.83	▲18.15
Registered electors		49,963		
Majority		174	0.49	▼0.08
BN gain from PKR		Swing		?

Johor state election, 2022
Party	Candidate	Votes	%	∆%
PKR	Arthur Chiong Sen Sern	9,439	39.20	▼26.48
BN	Supayyah Solaimuthu	9,302	38.63	▲11.56
PN	Tan Heng Choon	3,989	16.57	▲16.57
Heritage	Lee Ming Wen	1,349	5.60	▲5.60
Total valid votes		24,079	100.00	
Total rejected ballots		624		
Unreturned ballots		117		
Turnout		24,820	53.68	▼33.69
Registered electors		46,237		
Majority		137	0.57	▼38.04
PKR hold		Swing		

Johor state election, 2018
Party	Candidate	Votes	%	∆%
PKR	Jimmy Puah Wee Tse	17,105	65.68	▲5.58
BN	Teo Lee Ho	7,048	27.07	▼12.19
PAS	Juwahir Amin	1,888	7.25	▲7.25
Total valid votes		26,041	100.00	
Total rejected ballots		306		
Unreturned ballots		53		
Turnout		26,400	87.37	▼2.50
Registered electors		30,216		
Majority		10,057	38.61	▲18.04
PKR hold		Swing		

Johor state election, 2013
Party	Candidate	Votes	%	∆%
PKR	Jimmy Puah Wee Tse	11,676	59.83	▲17.50
BN	Cheong Chin Liang	7,661	39.26	▼17.50
Independent	Surendiran Kuppayah	177	0.91	
Total valid votes		19,514	100.00	
Total rejected ballots		493		
Unreturned ballots		0		
Turnout		20,007	89.87	▲9.03
Registered electors		22,262		
Majority		4,015	20.57	▲5.23
PKR gain from BN		Swing		?
Source(s) "Federal Government Gazette – Notice of Contested Election, State Legislative Assembly for the State of Selangor [P.U. (B) 192/2013]" (PDF). Attorney General's Chambers of Malaysia. 26 April 2013. Archived from the original (PDF) on 29 December 2019. "Federal Government Gazette – Results of Contested Election and Statements of the Poll after the Official Addition of Votes, State Constituencies for the State of Selangor [P.U. (B) 233/2013]" (PDF). Attorney General's Chambers of Malaysia. 22 May 2013. Archived from the original (PDF) on 2 October 2018.

Johor state election, 2008
Party	Candidate	Votes	%	∆%
BN	Cheong Chin Liang	8,805	57.67	▼19.39
PKR	Liew Shin Kheong	6,464	42.33	▲19.39
Total valid votes		15,269	100.00	
Total rejected ballots		524		
Unreturned ballots		17		
Turnout		15,810	80.84	▲2.78
Registered electors		19,556		
Majority		2,341	15.34	▼28.78
BN hold		Swing		

Johor state election, 2004
Party	Candidate	Votes	%
BN	Cheong Chin Liang	10,301	77.06
PKR	Liew Shin Kheong	3,066	22.94
Total valid votes		13,367	100.00
Total rejected ballots		442	
Unreturned ballots		12	
Turnout		13,821	78.06
Registered electors		17,705	
Majority		7,235	54.12
This was a new constituency created.
