= List of current heads of states and governments of Malaysia =

This is the list of present leaders of Malaysian states and federal territories.

State and Federal Territory	Position	Name	Since
Johor	Sultan	Ibrahim Iskandar	23 January 2010
Johor	Regent	Tunku Ismail Idris (Note: Tunku Ismail Idris was appointed as Regent of Johor to reign Johor instead of Sultan Ibrahim Iskandar who has reigned Malaysia as the Yang di-Pertuan Agong since 31 January 2024.)	31 January 2024
Johor	Menteri Besar	Onn Hafiz Ghazi	15 March 2022
Kedah	Sultan	Sallehuddin	12 September 2017
Kedah	Menteri Besar	Muhammad Sanusi Md Nor	17 May 2020
Kelantan	Sultan	Muhammad V	13 September 2010
Kelantan	Menteri Besar	Mohd Nassuruddin Daud	15 August 2023
Kuala Lumpur	Yang di-Pertuan Agong	Ibrahim Iskandar	31 January 2024
Kuala Lumpur	Minister	Hannah Yeoh Tseow Suan	17 December 2025
Kuala Lumpur	Mayor	Fadlun Mak Ujud	15 November 2025
Labuan	Yang di-Pertuan Agong	Ibrahim Iskandar	31 January 2024
Labuan	Minister	Hannah Yeoh Tseow Suan	17 December 2025
Labuan	Chairman	Anifah Aman	19 June 2023
Labuan	Chief Executive Officer	Rithuan Mohd Ismail	19 September 2022
Malacca	Yang di-Pertua Negeri	Mohd Ali Rustam	4 June 2020
Malacca	Chief Minister	Ab Rauf Yusoh	31 March 2023
Negeri Sembilan	Yang di-Pertuan Besar	Muhriz	29 December 2008
Negeri Sembilan	Menteri Besar	Ismail Lasim	2 August 2026
Pahang	Sultan	Abdullah	11 January 2019
Pahang	Menteri Besar	Wan Rosdy Wan Ismail	15 May 2018
Penang	Yang di-Pertua Negeri	Ramli Ngah Talib	1 May 2025
Penang	Chief Minister	Chow Kon Yeow	14 May 2018
Perak	Sultan	Nazrin Shah	29 May 2014
Perak	Menteri Besar	Saarani Mohamad	10 December 2020
Perlis	Raja	Sirajuddin	17 April 2000
Perlis	Menteri Besar	Abu Bakar Hamzah	28 December 2025
Putrajaya	Yang di-Pertuan Agong	Ibrahim Iskandar	31 January 2024
Putrajaya	Minister	Hannah Yeoh Tseow Suan	17 December 2025
Putrajaya	President	Mohd Sakeri Abdul Kadir	15 November 2025
Sabah	Yang di-Pertua Negeri	Musa Aman	1 January 2025
Sabah	Chief Minister	Hajiji Noor	29 September 2020
Sarawak	Yang di-Pertua Negeri	Wan Junaidi Tuanku Jaafar	26 January 2024
Sarawak	Premier	Abang Abdul Rahman Johari	13 January 2017
Selangor	Sultan	Sharafuddin	22 November 2001
Selangor	Menteri Besar	Amirudin Shari	19 June 2018
Terengganu	Sultan	Mizan Zainal Abidin	15 May 1998
Terengganu	Menteri Besar	Ahmad Samsuri Mokhtar	10 May 2018
