= Chow Kon Yeow =

Malaysian politician, lawyer and journalist

Yang Amat Berhormat Tuan Chow Kon Yeow MP MLA
- 曹观友
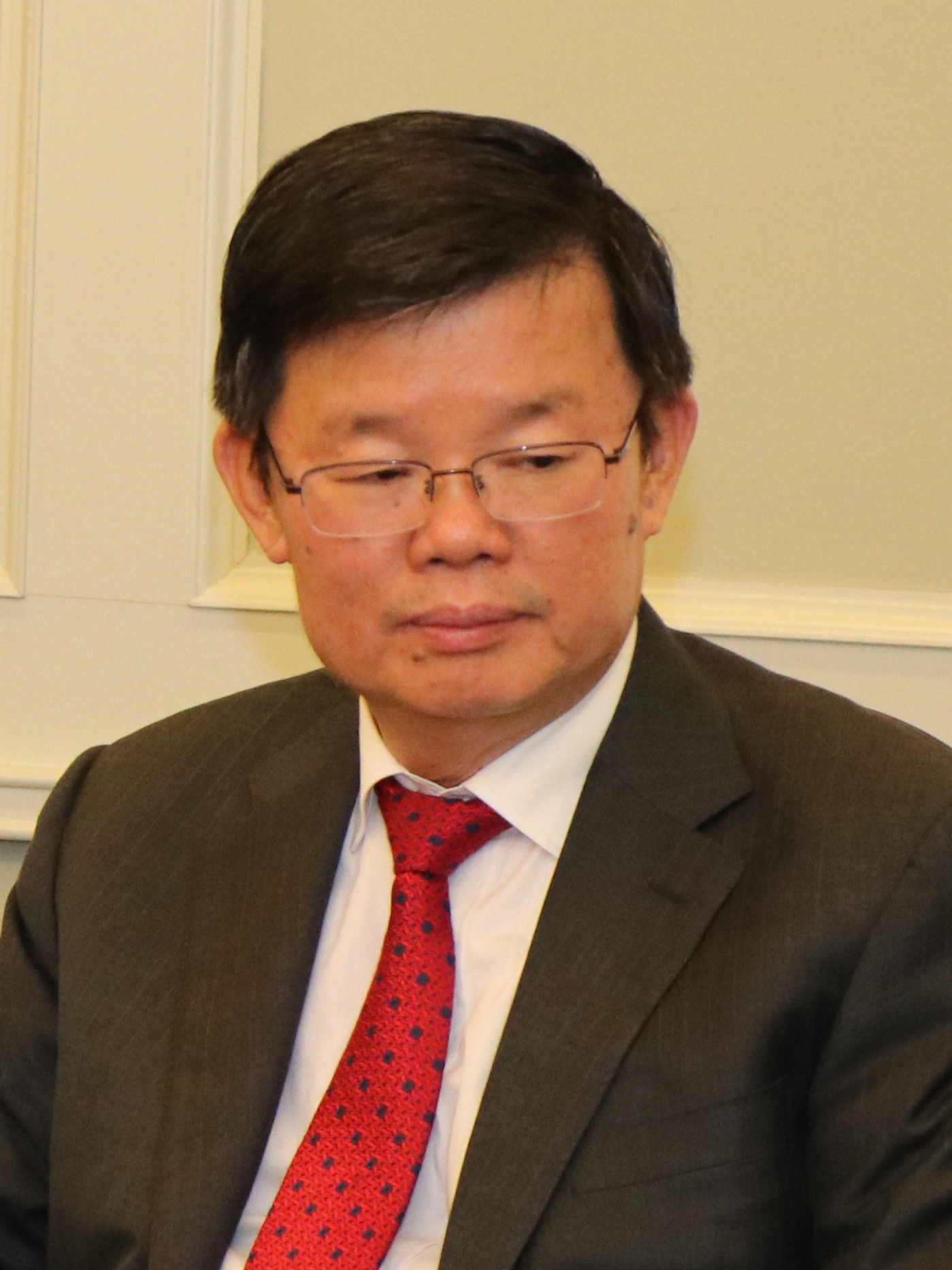
- Chow in 2019

5th Chief Minister of Penang
- Incumbent
- Assumed office 14 May 2018
- Governor: Abdul Rahman Abbas (2018–2021); Ahmad Fuzi Abdul Razak (2021–2025); Ramli Ngah Talib (since 2025)
- Deputy: Ahmad Zakiyuddin Abdul Rahman (2018–2023); Ramasamy Palanisamy (2018–2023); Mohamad Abdul Hamid (since 2023); Jagdeep Singh Deo (since 2023)
- Preceded by: Lim Guan Eng
- Constituency: Padang Kota

Member of the Penang State Executive Council (Local Government, Traffic Management and Environment: 13 March 2008–8 May 2013) (Local Government, Traffic Management and Flood Mitigation: 9 May 2013–14 May 2018)
- In office 13 March 2008 – 15 May 2018
- Governor: Abdul Rahman Abbas
- Chief Minister: Lim Guan Eng
- Preceded by: Teng Hock Nan (Local Government and Traffic Management); Teng Chang Yeow (Environment)
- Succeeded by: Jagdeep Singh Deo (Local Government and Traffic Management); Zairil Khir Johari (Flood Mitigation)
- Constituency: Padang Kota

1st State Chairman of the Pakatan Harapan of Penang
- Incumbent
- Assumed office 21 May 2019
- National Chairman: Mahathir Mohamad (2019–2020); Anwar Ibrahim (since 2020)
- Preceded by: Position established

Member of the Central Executive Committee of the Democratic Action Party
- Incumbent
- Assumed office 16 March 2025 Serving with Teo Kok Seong & Liow Cai Tung
- Secretary-General: Anthony Loke Siew Fook

National Vice Chairman of the Democratic Action Party
- In office 4 September 2004 – 16 March 2025 Serving with Chong Chieng Jen & M. Kulasegaran & Teresa Kok Suh Sim & Nga Kor Ming
- Secretary-General: Lim Guan Eng (2004–2022); Anthony Loke Siew Fook (2022–2025)
- National Chairman: Karpal Singh (2004–2014); Tan Kok Wai (2014–2022); Lim Guan Eng (2022–2025)

State Chairman of the Democratic Action Party of Penang
- In office 1999 – 22 September 2024
- Deputy: Jagdeep Singh Deo
- Secretary-General: Kerk Kim Hock (1999–2004); Lim Guan Eng (2004–2022); Anthony Loke Siew Fook (2022–2024)
- Succeeded by: Steven Sim Chee Keong

Member of the Malaysian Parliament for Batu Kawan
- Incumbent
- Assumed office 19 November 2022
- Preceded by: Kasthuriraani Patto (PH–DAP)
- Majority: 40,400 (2022)

Member of the Malaysian Parliament for Tanjong
- In office 9 May 2018 – 19 November 2022
- Preceded by: Ng Wei Aik (PR–DAP)
- Succeeded by: Lim Hui Ying (PH–DAP)
- Majority: 29,599 (2018)
- In office 29 November 1999 – 5 May 2013
- Preceded by: Lim Kit Siang (DAP)
- Succeeded by: Ng Wei Aik (PR–DAP)
- Majority: 4,477 (1999); 4,228 (2004); 18,489 (2008)

Member of the Penang State Legislative Assembly for Padang Kota
- Incumbent
- Assumed office 8 March 2008
- Preceded by: Teng Chang Yeow (BN–GERAKAN)
- Majority: 1,661 (2008); 7,196 (2013); 7,808 (2018); 7,116 (2023)

Member of the Penang State Legislative Assembly for Pengkalan Kota
- In office 21 October 1990 – 24 April 1995
- Preceded by: Teoh Teik Huat (DAP)
- Succeeded by: Lee Hack Teik (BN–MCA)
- Majority: 3,670 (1990)

Personal details
- Born: Chow Kon Yeow; 14 November 1958 (age 67) Kuala Lumpur, Selangor, Federation of Malaya
- Citizenship: Malaysia
- Party: Democratic Action Party (DAP)
- Other political affiliations: Gagasan Rakyat (GR) (1990–1996); Barisan Alternatif (BA) (1999–2004); Pakatan Rakyat (PR) (2008–2015); Pakatan Harapan (PH) (since 2015)
- Spouse: Tan Lean Kee
- Children: 2
- Education: University of Science Malaysia (BSocSci)

Chow Kon Yeow (simplified Chinese: 曹观友; traditional Chinese: 曹觀友; pinyin: Cáo Guānyǒu; Pe̍h-ōe-jī: Chô Kuan-iú; born 14 November 1958) is a Malaysian politician and journalist who has served as the 5th Chief Minister of Penang since May 2018. A member of the Democratic Action Party (DAP), he served as Member of the Penang State Legislative Assembly (MLA) for Padang Kota since March 2008 and Member of Parliament (MP) for Batu Kawan since November 2022. He is presently the only Chinese head of state government among the 13 Malaysian states.

Chow served as Member of the Penang State Executive Council (EXCO) in the Pakatan Rakyat (PR) and Pakatan Harapan (PH) state administrations under former Chief Minister Lim Guan Eng from March 2008 to his promotion to Chief Ministership in May 2018, MP for Tanjong from November 1999 to May 2013 and again from May 2018 to November 2022 and the MLA for Pengkalan Kota from October 1990 to April 1995. He has also served as the State Chairman of PH of Penang from May 2019 and member of the Central Executive Committee (CEC) of DAP since March 2025. He also served as the National Vice Chairman of DAP from September 2004 to March 2025 and the State Chairman of DAP of Penang from 1999 to September 2024.

== Early life and education ==
Chow Kon Yeow was born on 14 November 1958 in Kuala Lumpur, Selangor, Federation of Malaya. He lived in Jalan Tiga, Cheras in a squatter settlement. Chow received his early education at Sekolah Kebangsaan Jalan Sungai Besi 1, Cochrane Road School and Tunku Abdul Rahman College.

Failing to enter university, he worked as a draughtsman in Petaling Jaya for two years, before being convinced to re-apply by his boss. He graduated from Universiti Sains Malaysia (USM) with a Bachelor of Social Science in 1984 before working as a journalist.

== Early political career ==
In 1986, Chow, began political participation by joining then Opposition Leader Lim Kit Siang in the 1986 general election campaign and publication activities. He then served as his political secretary before contesting in the 1990 Penang state election.

He was elected and served as Member of the Penang State Legislative Assembly (MLA) for Pengkalan Kota between 1990 and 1995. He later contested as MLA for Padang Kota and Member of Parliament (MP) of Tanjong.

In the 2008 Penang state election, the Pakatan Rakyat (PR) coalition, consisting of DAP, won 29 out of the 40 state assembly seats, defeating the Barisan Nasional (BN) coalition and its 39-year hold on the Penang state government. In 2008, he was appointed as a Member of the Penang State Executive Council (EXCO) in the PR and state administrations under new Chief Minister Lim Guan Eng. He served as an EXCO between 2008 and 2018.

== Chief Minister of Penang (2018—) ==
On 12 May 2018, the incumbent Chief Minister, Lim, was appointed the Finance Minister by the new Malaysian Prime Minister, Mahathir Mohamad after the concurrent 2018 state and general election. Lim endorsed Chow to succeed as the Chief Minister, as early as 2016. On 14 May, he was sworn in as the fifth Chief Minister before Governor Abdul Rahman Abbas.

In August 2018, Chow launched his administration's socio-economic blueprint "Penang 2030". In September 2026, he mentioned that 80% of key targets had been met or were "actively progressing". He has repeatedly mention that he strives to balance development between Penang island and Seberang Perai, mentioning in the state legislature in that:

...Pulau Pinang adalah di Seberang Perai

[...The future of Penang is in Seberang Perai]

On 20 March 2022, at the 17th Democratic Action Party National Congress, Chow was re-elected into the Central Executive Committee with 1641 votes, the 2nd highest vote, after Gobind Singh Deo. He was then re-appointed the Vice National Chairman under Lim.

On 28 June 2023, Chow dissolved the state assembly, paving the way for the 2023 Penang state election. He led the unity coalition between Pakatan Harapan (PH) and Barisan Nasional (BN) coalitions to secure a two-thirds majority. On 13 August, he was sworn him for a second term as Chief Minister before Governor Ahmad Fuzi Abdul Razak.

== Personal life ==
Chow is married to Tan Lean Kee. The couple has two sons.

He tested positive for COVID-19 on 1 November 2022.

== Election results ==
Penang State Legislative Assembly
Year	Constituency	Candidate	Votes	Pct	Opponent(s)	Votes	Pct	Ballots cast	Majority	Turnout
1990	N23 Pengkalan Kota	Chow Kon Yeow (DAP)	11,336	58.51%	Loh Huck Hun (MCA)	7,666	39.56%	19,376	3,670	76.83%
1995	N23 Pengkalan Kota	Chow Kon Yeow (DAP)	7,523	44.27%	Lee Hack Teik (MCA)	9,036	53.18%	16,993	1,513	78.79%
1995	N23 Pengkalan Kota	Chow Kon Yeow (DAP)	7,523	44.27%	Khoo Soo Hoe (PBS)	131	0.77%	16,993	1,513	78.79%
1999	N22 Padang Kota	Chow Kon Yeow (DAP)	5,211	31.10%	Teng Chang Yeow (Gerakan)	6,851	40.88%	16,758	1,640	77.01%
2004	N26 Padang Kota	Chow Kon Yeow (DAP)	4,584	40.13%	Teng Chang Yeow (Gerakan)	6,838	59.87%	11,655	2,254	63.66%
2008	N26 Padang Kota	Chow Kon Yeow (DAP)	6,449	57.14%	Teng Chang Yeow (Gerakan)	4,788	42.42%	11,507	1,661	68.89%
2013	N26 Padang Kota	Chow Kon Yeow (DAP)	9,563	80.03%	Oh Tong Keong (Gerakan)	2,367	19.81%	12,078	7,196	78.56%
2018	N26 Padang Kota	Chow Kon Yeow (DAP)	9,278	85.75%	H'ng Khoon Leng (Gerakan)	1,470	13.59%	10,961	7,808	75.72%
2018	N26 Padang Kota	Chow Kon Yeow (DAP)	9,278	85.75%	Goh Saik Wei (MUP)	71	0.66%	10,961	7,808	75.72%
2023	N26 Padang Kota	Chow Kon Yeow (DAP)	8,261	87.83%	H'ng Khoon Leng (Gerakan)	1,145	12.17%	9,406	7,116	62.02%

Parliament of Malaysia
Year	Constituency	Candidate	Votes	Pct	Opponent(s)	Votes	Pct	Ballots cast	Majority	Turnout
1999	P048 Tanjong	Chow Kon Yeow (DAP)	23,437	54.00%	Cheang Chee Gooi (Gerakan)	18,960	43.68%	43,403	4,477	70.85%
2004	P049 Tanjong	Chow Kon Yeow (DAP)	21,652	55.41%	Ooi Swee Hing (Gerakan)	17,424	44.59%	39,793	4,228	68.72%
2008	P049 Tanjong	Chow Kon Yeow (DAP)	28,248	74.14%	Keow Veon Szu (Gerakan)	9,759	25.61%	38,734	18,489	72.82%
2018	P049 Tanjong	Chow Kon Yeow (DAP)	34,663	87.25%	Ng Siew Lai (Gerakan)	5,064	12.75%	39,727	29,599	80.90%
2022	P046 Batu Kawan	Chow Kon Yeow (DAP)	50,744	73.72%	Wong Chia Zhen (Gerakan)	10,344	15.03%	88,812	40,400	77.50%
2022	P046 Batu Kawan	Chow Kon Yeow (DAP)	50,744	73.72%	Tan Lee Huat (MCA)	7,145	10.38%	88,812	40,400	77.50%
2022	P046 Batu Kawan	Chow Kon Yeow (DAP)	50,744	73.72%	Ong Chin Wen (WARISAN)	450	0.65%	88,812	40,400	77.50%
2022	P046 Batu Kawan	Chow Kon Yeow (DAP)	50,744	73.72%	Lee Ah Liang (PRM)	148	0.22%	88,812	40,400	77.50%

== Honours ==
=== Honours of Malaysia ===
- Malaysia
  - Recipient of the 17th Yang di-Pertuan Agong Installation Medal (2024)

Political offices
Preceded by Lim Guan Eng	5th Chief Minister of Penang; 2018 - present	Incumbent
