= Bukit Tengah (state constituency) =

State constituency in Malaysia

Bukit Tengah (N17)
Penang constituency

State constituency
- Legislature: Penang State Legislative Assembly
MLA
Gooi Hsiao Leung
PH
- Constituency created: 1974
- First contested: 1974
- Last contested: 2023

Demographics
- Electors (2023): 31,635
- Area (km²): 52

Bukit Tengah is a state constituency in Penang, Malaysia, that has been represented in the Penang State Legislative Assembly.

The state constituency was first contested in 1974 and is mandated to return a single Assemblyman to the Penang State Legislative Assembly under the first-past-the-post voting system. Since 2018, the State Assemblyman for Bukit Tengah is Gooi Hsiao-Leung from Parti Keadilan Rakyat (PKR), which is part of the state's ruling coalition, Pakatan Harapan (PH).

== Definition ==
=== Polling districts ===
According to the federal gazette issued on 18 July 2023 the Bukit Tengah constituency is divided into 9 polling districts.

State constituency	Polling Districts	Code	Location
Bukit Tengah（N17）	Kampong Jawa	046/17/01	SJK (T) Ladang Prye
Bukit Tengah（N17）	Jalan Pengkalan	046/17/02	SK Kebun Sireh
Bukit Tengah（N17）	Kebun Sireh	046/17/03	SK Kebun Sireh
Bukit Tengah（N17）	Bukit Tengah	046/17/04	SJK (C) Peng Bin
Bukit Tengah（N17）	Kuala Juru	046/17/05	SK Juru; SJK (T) Juru
Bukit Tengah（N17）	Juru	046/17/06	SJK (C) True Light
Bukit Tengah（N17）	Taman Perwira	046/17/07	SMK Taman Perwira
Bukit Tengah（N17）	Taman Sejati	046/17/08	SJK (C) Peng Bin
Bukit Tengah（N17）	Taman Sentul Jaya	046/17/09	SMK Permai Indah

== Demographics ==
Ethnic breakdown of Bukit Tengah's electorate as of 2023
1. Chinese (46.1%)
2. Malay (36.1%)
3. Indian (16.8%)
4. Other ethnicities (1.09%)

Total electors by polling district in 2016
Polling district	Electors
Kampong Jawa	720
Jalan Pengkalan	1,686
Kebun Sireh	2,537
Bukit Tengah	2,998
Kuala Juru	3,465
Juru	3,626
Taman Perwira	792
Taman Sejati	1,643
Taman Sentul Jaya	2,279
Total	19,746
Source: Malaysian Election Commission

== History ==
Penang State Legislative Assemblyman for Bukit Tengah
Assembly	No	Years	Member	Party
Constituency created from Alma and Permatang Pauh
4th	N10	1974 – 1978	Harun Sirat	BN (GERAKAN)
5th	N10	1978 – 1982	Liang Thau Sang (梁道生)	BN (GERAKAN)
6th	N10	1982 – 1986	Liang Thau Sang (梁道生)	BN (GERAKAN)
7th	N15	1986 – 1990	Liang Thau Sang (梁道生)	BN (GERAKAN)
8th	N15	1990 – 1995	Chian Heng Kai (陈庆佳)	GR (DAP)
9th	N15	1995 – 1999	Liang Thau Sang (梁道生)	BN (GERAKAN)
10th	N15	1999 – 2004	Ng Siew Lai (吴秀丽)	BN (GERAKAN)
11th	N17	2004 – 2008	Ng Siew Lai (吴秀丽)	BN (GERAKAN)
12th	N17	2008 – 2013	Ong Chin Wen (王敬文)	PR (PKR)
13th	N17	2013 – 2015	Ong Chin Wen (王敬文)	PR (PKR)
13th	N17	2015 – 2018	Ong Chin Wen (王敬文)	PH (PKR)
14th	N17	2018 – 2023	Gooi Hsiao Leung (魏晓隆)	PH (PKR)
15th	N17	2023–present	Gooi Hsiao Leung (魏晓隆)	PH (PKR)

== Election results ==
The electoral results for the Bukit Tengah state constituency are as follows.

Penang state election, 2023
Party	Candidate	Votes	%	∆%
PH	Gooi Hsiao-Leung	16,050	68.58	▲2.42
PN	Baljit Singh Jigiri Singh	7,353	31.42	▲31.42
Total valid votes		23,403	100.00	
Total rejected ballots		208		
Unreturned ballots		18		
Turnout		23,629	74.69	▼11.51
Registered electors		31,635		
Majority		8,697	37.16	▼8.01
PH hold		Swing		

Penang state election, 2018
Party	Candidate	Votes	%	∆%
PKR	Gooi Hsiao-Leung	12,535	66.16	▲0.94
BN	Thor Teong Gee	3,977	20.99	▼12.68
PAS	Norazman Ishak	2,355	12.43	▲12.43
Parti Rakyat Malaysia	Tan Hiang Lye	53	0.28	▲0.28
Penang Front Party	Edward Joseph	27	0.14	▲0.14
Total valid votes		18,947	100.00	
Total rejected ballots		215		
Unreturned ballots		30		
Turnout		19,192	86.20	▼2.10
Registered electors		22,276		
Majority		8,558	45.17	▲13.62
PKR hold		Swing		
Source(s) "His Majesty's Government Gazette - Notice of Contested Election, State Legislative Assembly for the State of Penang [P.U. (B) 252/2018]" (PDF). Attorney General's Chambers of Malaysia. 3 May 2018. "Federal Government Gazette - Results of Contested Election and Statements of the Poll after the Official Addition of Votes, State Constituencies for the State of Penang [P.U. (B) 326/2018]" (PDF). Attorney General's Chambers of Malaysia. 28 May 2018. Archived from the original (PDF) on 29 August 2019.

Penang state election, 2013
Party	Candidate	Votes	%	∆%
PKR	Ong Chin Wen	10,730	65.22	▲6.99
BN	Teng Chang Yeow	5,540	33.67	▼8.10
Independent	Mohan Apparoo	182	1.10	▲1.10
Total valid votes		16,452	100.00	
Total rejected ballots		270		
Unreturned ballots		0		
Turnout		16,722	88.30	▲9.40
Registered electors		18,928		
Majority		5,190	31.55	▲15.09
PKR hold		Swing		
Source(s) "Federal Government Gazette - Notice of Contested Election, State Legislative Assembly for the State of Penang [P.U. (B) 189/2013]" (PDF). Attorney General's Chambers of Malaysia. 26 April 2013. "Federal Government Gazette - Results of Contested Election and Statements of the Poll after the Official Addition of Votes, State Constituencies for the State of Penang [P.U. (B) 230/2013]" (PDF). Attorney General's Chambers of Malaysia. 22 May 2013. Archived from the original (PDF) on 22 March 2019.

Penang state election, 2008
Party	Candidate	Votes	%	∆%
PKR	Ong Chin Wen	6,736	58.23	▲27.95
BN	Ng Siew Lai	4,832	41.77	▼27.95
Total valid votes		11,568	100.00	
Total rejected ballots		257		
Unreturned ballots		10		
Turnout		11,835	78.90	▲1.13
Registered electors		14,995		
Majority		1,904	16.46	▼22.98
PKR gain from BN		Swing		?

Penang state election, 2004
Party	Candidate	Votes	%	∆%
BN	Ng Siew Lai	7,116	69.72	▲10.42
PKR	Law Choo Kiang	3,090	30.28	▲30.28
Total valid votes		10,206	100.00	
Total rejected ballots		224		
Unreturned ballots		5		
Turnout		10,435	77.77	▲0.44
Registered electors		13,470		
Majority		4,026	39.44	▲20.84
BN hold		Swing		

Penang state election, 1999
Party	Candidate	Votes	%	∆%
BN	Ng Siew Lai	11,480	59.30	▼3.08
DAP	Tan Ah Huat	7,880	40.70	▲3.08
Total valid votes		19,360	100.00	
Total rejected ballots		448		
Unreturned ballots		17		
Turnout		19,825	77.33	▼1.88
Registered electors		25,636		
Majority		3,600	18.60	▼6.16
BN hold		Swing		

Penang state election, 1995
Party	Candidate	Votes	%	∆%
BN	Liang Thau Sang	11,790	62.38	▲11.62
DAP	Tan Ah Huat	7,111	37.62	▼11.62
Total valid votes		18,901	100.00	
Total rejected ballots		454		
Unreturned ballots		39		
Turnout		19,394	79.21	▲0.03
Registered electors		24,485		
Majority		4,679	24.76	▲23.24
BN gain from DAP		Swing		?

Penang state election, 1990
Party	Candidate	Votes	%	∆%
DAP	Chian Heng Kai	6,346	50.76	▲6.23
BN	Liang Thau Sang	6,155	49.24	▼4.16
Total valid votes		12,501	100.00	
Total rejected ballots		321		
Unreturned ballots		152		
Turnout		12,974	79.18	▲3.12
Registered electors		16,384		
Majority		191	1.52	▼7.51
DAP gain from BN		Swing		?

Penang state election, 1986
Party	Candidate	Votes	%	∆%
BN	Liang Thau Sang	5,945	53.40	▼18.68
DAP	Tan Yam Soon	4,939	44.37	▲34.04
NASMA	Tan Wooi Yin	248	2.23	▲2.23
Total valid votes		11,132	100.00	
Total rejected ballots		394		
Unreturned ballots		0		
Turnout		11,526	76.06	▼1.83
Registered electors		15,153		
Majority		1,006	9.03	▼45.47
BN hold		Swing		

Penang state election, 1982
Party	Candidate	Votes	%	∆%
BN	Liang Thau Sang	9,570	72.08	▲31.61
PAS	Jaffar Ahmad	2,334	17.58	▼7.60
DAP	Ng Sen Kwei	1,372	10.33	▼24.02
Total valid votes		13,276	100.00	
Total rejected ballots		404		
Unreturned ballots		0		
Turnout		13,667	77.89	▼1.82
Registered electors		17,547		
Majority		7,236	54.50	▲48.38
BN hold		Swing		

Penang state election, 1978
Party	Candidate	Votes	%	∆%
BN	Liang Thau Sang	3,728	40.47	▼8.41
DAP	Ong Chin Siong	3,164	34.35	▲12.91
PAS	Musa Mohd. Yatim	2,319	25.18	▲25.18
Total valid votes		9,211	100.00	
Total rejected ballots		404		
Unreturned ballots		0		
Turnout		9,615	79.71	▲1.21
Registered electors		12,063		
Majority		564	6.12	▼21.32
This was a new constituency created.

Penang state election, 1974
Party	Candidate	Votes	%
BN	Harun bin Sirat	2,961	48.88
DAP	Ng Chay Tet	1,299	21.44
PEKEMAS	Ong Chin Siong	1,058	17.46
Parti Sosialis Rakyat Malaysia	Sim Man Le	400	6.60
Kesatuan Insaf Tanah Air	Sim Man Le	340	5.61
Total valid votes		6,058	100.00
Total rejected ballots		449	
Unreturned ballots		0	
Turnout		6,507	78.50
Registered electors		8,290	
Majority		1,662	27.44
This was a new constituency created.

== See also ==
- Constituencies of Penang
