= Tebrau (federal constituency) =

Federal constituency in Johor, Malaysia

Tebrau (P158)
Johor constituency

Federal constituency
- Legislature: Dewan Rakyat
- MP: Jimmy Puah Wee Tse; PH
- Constituency created: 1984
- First contested: 1986
- Last contested: 2022

Demographics
- Population (2020): 475,267
- Electors (2026): 246,219
- Area (km²): 502
- Pop. density (per km²): 946.7

Tebrau is a federal constituency in Johor Bahru District, Kulai District and Kota Tinggi District, Johor, Malaysia, that has been represented in the Dewan Rakyat since 1986.

The federal constituency was created in the 1984 redistribution and is mandated to return a single member to the Dewan Rakyat under the first past the post voting system.

== Demographics ==
Ethnic breakdown of Tebrau's electorate as of 2022
1. Malay (45.0%)
2. Chinese (38.9%)
3. Indian (11.3%)
4. Other ethnicities (4.80%)

As of 2020, Tebrau has a population of 475,267 people.

Age breakdown of Tebrau's electorate as of 2022
1. 18-20 (9.67%)
2. 21-29 (27.1%)
3. 30-39 (20.4%)
4. 40-49 (18.3%)
5. 50-59 (14.0%)
6. 60-69 (7.14%)
7. 70-79 (2.56%)
8. 80-89 (0.72%)
9. above 90 (0.15%)
Gender breakdown of Tebrau's electorate as of 2022
1. Male (50.4%)
2. Female (49.6%)

== History ==
=== Polling districts ===
According to the gazette issued on 2 July 2026, the Tebrau constituency has a total of 44 polling districts.

State constituency	Polling districts	Code	Location
Tiram (N40)	Ulu Tiram Barat	158/40/01	SA Taman Bukit Tiram
Tiram (N40)	Bandar Ulu Tiram Barat	158/40/02	SK Taman Bukit Tiram
Tiram (N40)	Bandar Ulu Tiram Tengah	158/40/03	SMK Ulu Tiram
Tiram (N40)	Bandar Ulu Tiram Utara	158/40/04	SK Ulu Tiram
Tiram (N40)	Bandar Ulu Tiram Selatan	158/40/05	SJK (C) Tiram
Tiram (N40)	Ara Cemerlang	158/40/06	Dewan Seberguna Desa Cemerlang
Tiram (N40)	Ulu Tiram Timor	158/40/07	SA Bandar Tiram
Tiram (N40)	Nam Heng	158/40/08	SK Nam Heng
Tiram (N40)	Sungai Tiram	158/40/09	SK Sungai Tiram
Tiram (N40)	Kong Kong	158/40/10	SK Kongkong Laut
Tiram (N40)	Kampung Cahaya Baru	158/40/11	SK Cahaya Baru
Tiram (N40)	Kota Masai	158/40/12	SMK Kota Masai; SA Taman Kota Masai; SA Taman Kota Masai 2
Tiram (N40)	Kota Delima	158/40/13	SK Kota Masai; SA Taman Kota Masai
Tiram (N40)	Tanjong Langsat	158/40/14	SK Tanjong Langsat
Tiram (N40)	Tanjong Kopok	158/40/15	SK Perigi Acheh
Tiram (N40)	Pasir Puteh	158/40/16	SK Pasir Puteh
Tiram (N40)	Taman Pasir Puteh	158/40/17	SK Taman Pasir Putih; SMK Taman Pasir Puteh
Tiram (N40)	Desa Jaya	158/40/18	SK Taman Desa Jaya
Tiram (N40)	Cahaya Masai	158/40/19	SK Kopok
Tiram (N40)	Lembah Ehsan	158/40/20	SA Taman Desa Jaya
Tiram (N40)	Lanjut Cemerlang	158/40/21	SA Taman Desa Cemerlang
Tiram (N40)	Cemerlang Tropika	158/40/22	SK Desa Cemerlang
Tiram (N40)	Kampung Sentosa	158/40/23	SA Dato' Hj. Abd Rahman Ahmad
Tiram (N40)	Kota Pulasan	158/40/24	SK Kota Masai 2
Puteri Wangsa (N41)	FELDA Ulu Tebrau	158/41/01	SK (FELDA) Ulu Tebrau; SMK (FELDA) Ulu Tebrau
Puteri Wangsa (N41)	Maju Jaya	158/41/02	SK Kg. Maju Jaya
Puteri Wangsa (N41)	Nipah Delima	158/41/03	SK Taman Daya 2
Puteri Wangsa (N41)	Puteri Wangsa 1	158/41/04	SA Sabilul Muhtadin Taman Puteri Wangsa; Dewan Raya Taman Puteri Wangsa
Puteri Wangsa (N41)	Mount Austin	158/41/05	SMK Taman Mount Austin; SJK (C) Foon Yew 5
Puteri Wangsa (N41)	Bertam Delima	158/41/06	SK Taman Daya
Puteri Wangsa (N41)	Pekan Pandan	158/41/07	SJK (C) Pandan
Puteri Wangsa (N41)	Kangkar Tebrau Baru	158/41/08	SK Kangkar Tebrau
Puteri Wangsa (N41)	Kangkar Tebrau	158/41/09	SA Kangkar Tebrau
Puteri Wangsa (N41)	Ladang Tebrau	158/41/10	SJK (T) Ladang Tebrau
Puteri Wangsa (N41)	Taman Gembira	158/41/11	Balai Raya Taman Gembira
Puteri Wangsa (N41)	Bukit Jaya	158/41/12	SMK Puteri Wangsa
Puteri Wangsa (N41)	Rumbia Daya	158/41/13	SMK Taman Daya
Puteri Wangsa (N41)	Nibong Daya	158/41/14	SMK Tun Fatimah Hashim
Puteri Wangsa (N41)	Puteri Wangsa 2	158/41/15	SK Taman Puteri Wangsa
Puteri Wangsa (N41)	Pelangi Gaya	158/41/16	SMK Taman Pelangi Indah; SK Taman Pelangi Indah
Puteri Wangsa (N41)	Pinang Sagu	158/41/17	SK Taman Daya 3
Puteri Wangsa (N41)	Setia Enau	158/41/18	SMK Taman Daya 2; SA Taman Setia Indah; Dewan Serbaguna Taman Setia Indah
Puteri Wangsa (N41)	Bukit Mutiara	158/41/19	SK Bukit Mutiara
Puteri Wangsa (N41)	Desa Tebrau	158/41/20	SMK Taman Desa Tebrau

=== Representation history ===
Members of Parliament for Tebrau
Parliament	No	Years	Member	Party	Vote Share
Constituency created from Panti, Johor Bahru and Pulai
7th	P129	1986–1990	Siti Zainabon Abu Bakar (سيتي زينباون ابو بكر)	BN (UMNO)	27,137; 62.79%
8th	P129	1990–1995	Siti Zainabon Abu Bakar (سيتي زينباون ابو بكر)	BN (UMNO)	34,883; 63.48%
9th	P140	1995–1999	Siti Zainabon Abu Bakar (سيتي زينباون ابو بكر)	BN (UMNO)	44,670; 88.98%
10th	P140	1999–2004	Mohd. Ali Hassan (محمد. علي حسن)	BN (UMNO)	49,284; 78.13%
11th	P158	2004–2008	Teng Boon Soon (邓文村)	BN (MCA)	32,071; 84.11%
12th	P158	2008–2013	Teng Boon Soon (邓文村)	BN (MCA)	30,975; 65.77%
13th	P158	2013–2018	Khoo Soo Seang (邱思翔)	BN (MCA)	39,985; 51.13%
14th	P158	2018–2021	Steven Choong Shiau Yoon (锺少云)	PH (PKR)	64,535; 62.09%
14th	P158	2021	Steven Choong Shiau Yoon (锺少云)	Independent	64,535; 62.09%
14th	P158	2021–2022	Steven Choong Shiau Yoon (锺少云)	PBM	64,535; 62.09%
15th	P158	2022–present	Jimmy Puah Wee Tse (潘伟斯)	PH (PKR)	83,959; 49.99%

=== State constituency ===
Parliamentary constituency	State constituency						
Parliamentary constituency	1954–59*	1959–1974	1974–1986	1986–1995	1995–2004	2004–2018	2018–present
Tebrau				Pasir Gudang			
Tebrau						Puteri Wangsa	
Tebrau				Tiram			

=== Historical boundaries ===
State Constituency	Area			
State Constituency	1984	1994	2003	2018
Pasir Gudang	Masai; Pasir Pelangi; Permas Jaya; Plentong; Tanjung Langsat	Masai; Permas Jaya; Plentong; Seri Alam; Tanjung Langsat		
Puteri Wangsa			Bandar Dato Onn; FELDA Ulu Tebrau; Kampung Seelong Jaya; Pelangi Indah; Tebrau	Bandar Dato Onn; FELDA Ulu Tebrau; Kampung Seelong Jaya; Senai Airport City; Tebrau
Tiram	Ban Foo; FELDA Ulu Tebrau; Kampung Seelong Jaya; Tebrau; Ulu Tiram		Cahaya Baru; Cahaya Masai; Sungai Latoh; Tanjung Langsat; Ulu Tiram	

=== Current state assembly members ===
No.	State Constituency	Member	Coalition (Party)
N40	Tiram	Abdul Halim Suleiman	BN (UMNO)
N41	Puteri Wangsa	Maszlee Malik	PH (PKR)

=== Local governments & postcodes ===
No.	State Constituency	Local Government	Postcode
N40	Tiram	Pasir Gudang City Council; Johor Bahru City Council (Ulu Tiram area); Kota Tinggi District Council (Nam Heng area)	81100, 81200, 81300 Johor Bahru; 81700 Pasir Gudang; 81800 Ulu Tiram
N41	Puteri Wangsa	Johor Bahru City Council; Iskandar Puteri City Council (Maju Jaya area); Kulai Municipal Council (Senai Airport City area)	81100, 81200, 81300 Johor Bahru; 81700 Pasir Gudang; 81800 Ulu Tiram

== Election results ==
Malaysian general election, 2022
Party	Candidate	Votes	%	∆%
PH	Jimmy Puah Wee Tse	83,959	49.99	▲49.99
PN	Mohamad Isa Mohamad Basir	53,239	31.70	▲31.70
BN	Nicole Wong Siaw Ting	30,767	18.31	▼7.96
Total valid votes		167,965	100.00	
Total rejected ballots		1,014		
Unreturned ballots		435		
Turnout		169,414	75.90	▼9.78
Registered electors		223,301		
Majority		30,720	18.29	▼18.13
PH hold		Swing		
Source(s) https://lom.agc.gov.my/ilims/upload/portal/akta/outputp/1753254/PUB%20617%20PARLIMEN%20JOHOR.pdf

Malaysian general election, 2018
Party	Candidate	Votes	%	∆%
PKR	Choong Shiau Yoon	64,535	62.09	▲13.22
BN	Hou Kok Chung	27,310	26.27	▼24.86
PAS	Abdullah Husin	12,098	11.64	▲11.64
Total valid votes		103,943	100.00	
Total rejected ballots		274		
Unreturned ballots		1,203		
Turnout		105,420	85.68	▼2.55
Registered electors		123,033		
Majority		37,225	36.42	▲34.16
PKR gain from BN		Swing		?
Source(s) "His Majesty's Government Gazette - Notice of Contested Election, Parliament for the State of Johore [P.U. (B) 244/2018]" (PDF). Attorney General's Chambers of Malaysia. 3 May 2018. Archived from the original (PDF) on 2019-12-29. "Federal Government Gazette - Results of Contested Election and Statements of the Poll after the Official Addition of Votes, Parliamentary Constituencies for the State of Johore [P.U. (B) 318/2018]" (PDF). Attorney General's Chambers of Malaysia. 28 May 2018.

Malaysian general election, 2013
Party	Candidate	Votes	%	∆%
BN	Khoo Soo Seang	39,985	51.13	▼14.64
PKR	Choong Shiau Yoon	38,218	48.87	▲48.87
Total valid votes		78,203	100.00	
Total rejected ballots		1,551		
Unreturned ballots		81		
Turnout		79,835	88.23	▲10.32
Registered electors		90,482		
Majority		1,767	2.26	▼29.28
BN hold		Swing		
Source(s) "Federal Government Gazette - Notice of Contested Election, Parliament for the State of Johore [P.U. (B) 181/2013]" (PDF). Attorney General's Chambers of Malaysia. 26 April 2013. "Federal Government Gazette - Results of Contested Election and Statements of the Poll after the Official Addition of Votes, Parliamentary Constituencies for the State of Johore [P.U. (B) 222/2013]" (PDF). Attorney General's Chambers of Malaysia. 22 May 2013.

Malaysian general election, 2008
Party	Candidate	Votes	%	∆%
BN	Ling Ban San @ Teng Boon Soon	30,975	65.77	▼18.34
PAS	Roslani Sharif	16,124	34.23	▲18.34
Total valid votes		47,099	100.00	
Total rejected ballots		1,539		
Unreturned ballots		62		
Turnout		48,700	77.91	▲3.33
Registered electors		62,505		
Majority		14,851	31.54	▼36.68
BN hold		Swing		

Malaysian general election, 2004
Party	Candidate	Votes	%	∆%
BN	Ling Ban San @ Teng Boon Soon	32,071	84.11	▲5.98
PAS	Ya'akob Mohd Yusof	6,060	15.89	▲15.89
Total valid votes		38,131	100.00	
Total rejected ballots		1,101		
Unreturned ballots		29		
Turnout		39,261	74.58	▼0.61
Registered electors		52,644		
Majority		26,011	68.22	▲11.96
BN hold		Swing		

Malaysian general election, 1999
Party	Candidate	Votes	%	∆%
BN	Mohd. Ali Hassan	49,284	78.13	▼10.25
Parti Rakyat Malaysia	Hassan Abdul Karim	13,799	21.87	▲32.87
Total valid votes		63,083	100.00	
Total rejected ballots		1,680		
Unreturned ballots		809		
Turnout		65,572	75.19	▲0.26
Registered electors		87,202		
Majority		35,485	56.26	▼21.70
BN hold		Swing		

Malaysian general election, 1995
Party	Candidate	Votes	%	∆%
BN	Siti Zainabon Abu Bakar	44,670	88.98	▲25.50
PAS	Ya'akob Mohd Yusof	5,530	11.02	▲11.02
Total valid votes		50,200	100.00	
Total rejected ballots		2,451		
Unreturned ballots		20		
Turnout		52,671	74.93	▲2.58
Registered electors		70,298		
Majority		39,140	77.96	▲51.00
BN hold		Swing		

Malaysian general election, 1990
Party	Candidate	Votes	%	∆%
BN	Siti Zainabon Abu Bakar	34,883	63.48	▲0.69
S46	Abd. Rahman Mahmud	20,064	36.52	▲36.52
Total valid votes		54,947	100.00	
Total rejected ballots		2,666		
Unreturned ballots		0		
Turnout		57,613	72.35	▲2.57
Registered electors		79,636		
Majority		14,819	26.96	▲1.38
BN hold		Swing		

Malaysian general election, 1986
Party	Candidate	Votes	%
BN	Siti Zainabon Abu Bakar	27,138	62.79
Parti Rakyat Malaysia	Hassan Abdul Karim	16,085	37.21
Total valid votes		43,223	100.00
Total rejected ballots		2,274	
Unreturned ballots		0	
Turnout		45,497	69.78
Registered electors		65,203	
Majority		11,053	25.58
This was a new constituency created.
