= Gopalakrishnan Subramaniam =

Malaysian politician

Member of the Johor State Legislative Assembly for Tiram
- In office 28 June 2018 – 22 January 2022
- Preceded by: Maulizan Bujang
- Succeeded by: Azizul Bachok

Personal details
- Born: Gopalakrishnan s/o Subramaniam
- Citizenship: Malaysian
- Party: PKR (until 2026); BERSAMA (since 2026)
- Other political affiliations: Pakatan Harapan
- Occupation: Politician

Gopalakrishnan s/o Subramaniam, also known as S Gopalakrishnan, is a Malaysian politician from PKR. He was the Member of Johor State Legislative Assembly for Tiram from 2018 to 2022.

== Politics ==
He was the Vice President of PKR Johor and Chief of Johor Indian Community Bureau.

== Election results ==
Johor State Legislative Assembly
Year	Constituency	Candidate	Votes	Pct.	Opponent(s)	Votes	Pct.	Ballots cast	Majority	Turnout
2018	N40 Tiram	Gopalakrishnan Subramaniam (PKR)	26,573	51.87%	Maulizan Bujang (UMNO)	18,475	36.06%	51,234	8,098	84.42%
2018	N40 Tiram	Gopalakrishnan Subramaniam (PKR)	26,573	51.87%	Azman Atmin (PAS)	5,366	10.47%	51,234	8,098	84.42%
2022	N40 Tiram	Gopalakrishnan Subramaniam (PKR)	12,550	21.66%	Azizul Bachok (UMNO)	22,939	39.59%	57,938	5,281	54.81%
2022	N40 Tiram	Gopalakrishnan Subramaniam (PKR)	12,550	21.66%	Karim Deraman (PAS)	17,658	30.48%	57,938	5,281	54.81%
2022	N40 Tiram	Gopalakrishnan Subramaniam (PKR)	12,550	21.66%	Abdul Aziz Harun (PEJUANG)	1,391	2.40%	57,938	5,281	54.81%
2022	N40 Tiram	Gopalakrishnan Subramaniam (PKR)	12,550	21.66%	Mohd Azmi Ali (PBM)	860	1.48%	57,938	5,281	54.81%
2022	N40 Tiram	Gopalakrishnan Subramaniam (PKR)	12,550	21.66%	Jayasangkar Jeraman (IND)	654	1.13%	57,938	5,281	54.81%
2022	N40 Tiram	Gopalakrishnan Subramaniam (PKR)	12,550	21.66%	Bala Sundaram Perumal (IND)	365	0.63%	57,938	5,281	54.81%
