= Tiram (state constituency) =

Political subdivision in Malaysia

Tiram (N40)
Johor constituency
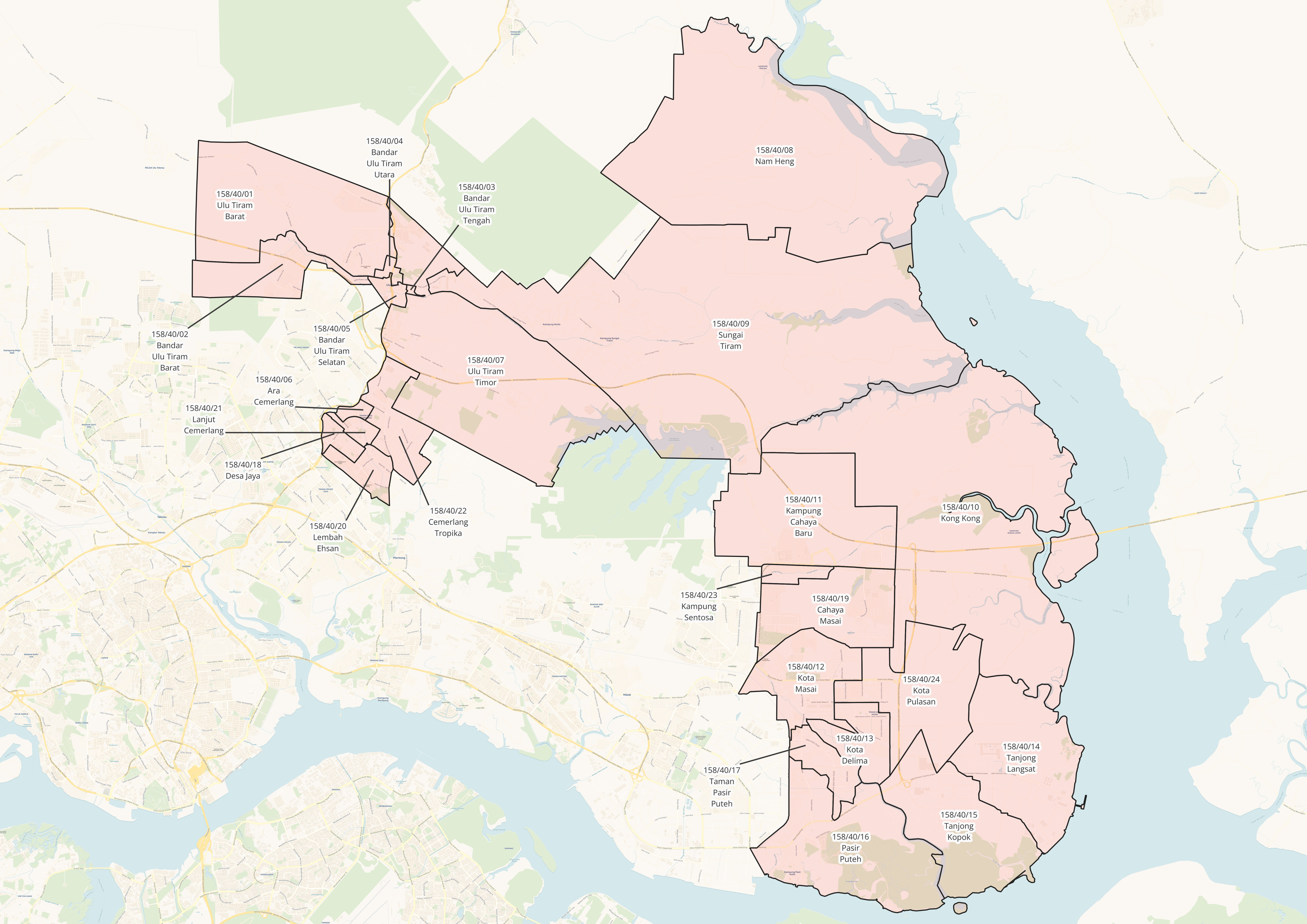

State constituency
- Legislature: Johor State Legislative Assembly
MLA
Abdul Halim Suleiman
BN
- Constituency created: 1974
- First contested: 1974
- Last contested: 2026

Demographics
- Population (2020): 203,056
- Electors (2026): 117,496
- Area (km²): 343

Tiram is a state constituency in Johor, Malaysia, that is represented in the Johor State Legislative Assembly.

The state constituency was first contested in 1974 and is mandated to return a single Assemblyman to the Johor State Legislative Assembly under the first-past-the-post voting system.

== Demographics ==
As of 2020, Tiram has a population of 203,056 people.

Ethnic breakdown of Tiram's electorate as of 2026
1. Malay (57.2%)
2. Chinese (24.5%)
3. Indian (11.6%)
4. Other ethnicities (6.70%)

== History ==
=== Polling districts ===
According to the gazette issued on 2 July 2026, the Tiram constituency has a total of 24 polling districts.

State constituency	Polling districts	Code	Location
Tiram (N40)	Ulu Tiram Barat	158/40/01	SA Taman Bukit Tiram
Tiram (N40)	Bandar Ulu Tiram Barat	158/40/02	SK Taman Bukit Tiram
Tiram (N40)	Bandar Ulu Tiram Tengah	158/40/03	SMK Ulu Tiram
Tiram (N40)	Bandar Ulu Tiram Utara	158/40/04	SK Ulu Tiram
Tiram (N40)	Bandar Ulu Tiram Selatan	158/40/05	SJK (C) Tiram
Tiram (N40)	Ara Cemerlang	158/40/06	Dewan Seberguna Desa Cemerlang
Tiram (N40)	Ulu Tiram Timor	158/40/07	SA Bandar Tiram
Tiram (N40)	Nam Heng	158/40/08	SK Nam Heng
Tiram (N40)	Sungai Tiram	158/40/09	SK Sungai Tiram
Tiram (N40)	Kong Kong	158/40/10	SK Kongkong Laut
Tiram (N40)	Kampung Cahaya Baru	158/40/11	SK Cahaya Baru
Tiram (N40)	Kota Masai	158/40/12	SMK Kota Masai; SA Taman Kota Masai; SA Taman Kota Masai 2
Tiram (N40)	Kota Delima	158/40/13	SK Kota Masai; SA Taman Kota Masai
Tiram (N40)	Tanjong Langsat	158/40/14	SK Tanjong Langsat
Tiram (N40)	Tanjong Kopok	158/40/15	SK Perigi Acheh
Tiram (N40)	Pasir Puteh	158/40/16	SK Pasir Puteh
Tiram (N40)	Taman Pasir Puteh	158/40/17	SK Taman Pasir Putih; SMK Taman Pasir Puteh
Tiram (N40)	Desa Jaya	158/40/18	SK Taman Desa Jaya
Tiram (N40)	Cahaya Masai	158/40/19	SK Kopok
Tiram (N40)	Lembah Ehsan	158/40/20	SA Taman Desa Jaya
Tiram (N40)	Lanjut Cemerlang	158/40/21	SA Taman Desa Cemerlang
Tiram (N40)	Cemerlang Tropika	158/40/22	SK Desa Cemerlang
Tiram (N40)	Kampung Sentosa	158/40/23	SA Dato' Hj. Abd Rahman Ahmad
Tiram (N40)	Kota Pulasan	158/40/24	SK Kota Masai 2

=== Representation history ===
Members of the Legislative Assembly for Tiram
Assembly	No	Years	Member	Party
Constituency created from Kota Tinggi and Plentong
4th	N31	1974-1978	Hasnah Ahmad	BN (UMNO)
5th	N31	1978-1982	Jaafar Hamzah	BN (UMNO)
6th	N31	1982-1986	Ali Hassan	BN (UMNO)
7th	N29	1986-1990	Ali Hassan	BN (UMNO)
8th	N29	1990-1995	Ali Hassan	BN (UMNO)
9th	N31	1995-1999	Ali Hassan	BN (UMNO)
10th	N31	1999-2004	Mohamad Dolmat	BN (UMNO)
11th	N40	2004-2008	Maulizan Bujang	BN (UMNO)
12th	N40	2008-2013	Maulizan Bujang	BN (UMNO)
13th	N40	2013–2018	Maulizan Bujang	BN (UMNO)
14th	N40	2018-2022	Gopalakrishnan Subramaniam (கோபாலகிருஷ்ணன் சுப்ரமணியம்)	PH (PKR)
15th	N40	2022–2026	Azizul Bachok	BN (UMNO)
16th	N40	2026-present	Abdul Halim Suleiman	BN (UMNO)

== Election results ==
Johor state election, 2026
Party	Candidate	Votes	%	∆%
BN	Abdul Halim Suleiman	49,965	60.11	▲19.45
PH	Nor Zulaila Abd Ghani	21,710	26.12	▲26.12
PN	Khirul Muntanazar Ismail	9,225	11.10	▼20.20
BERSAMA	Haris Fakhrudin Abdul Malek	2,229	2.68	▲2.68
Total valid votes		83,129	100.00	
Total rejected ballots		1,041		
Unreturned ballots		74		
Turnout		84,244	71.70	▲16.89
Registered electors		117,496		
Majority		28,255	33.99	▲24.63
BN hold		Swing		?

Johor state election, 2022
Party	Candidate	Votes	%	∆%
BN	Azizul Bachok	22,939	40.66	▼4.01
PN	Karim Deraman	17,658	31.30	▲31.30
PKR	Gopalakrishnan Subramaniam	12,550	22.25	▼30.46
PEJUANG	Abdul Aziz Harun	1,391	2.47	▲2.47
PBM	Mohd Azmi Ali	860	1.52	▲1.52
Independent	Jayasangkar Jeraman	654	1.16	▲1.16
Independent	Bala Sundaram Perumal	365	0.65	▲0.65
Total valid votes		56,417	97.37	
Total rejected ballots		1,053	1.82	
Unreturned ballots		468	0.81	
Turnout		57,938	54.81	▼29.61
Registered electors		105,707		
Majority		5,281	9.36	▼6.70
BN gain from PKR		Swing		?

Johor state election, 2018
Party	Candidate	Votes	%	∆%
PKR	Gopalakrishnan Subramaniam	26,573	52.71	▲52.71
BN	Maulizan Bujang	18,475	36.65	▼22.66
PAS	Azman Atmin	5,366	10.64	▼30.05
Total valid votes		50,414	98.40	
Total rejected ballots		735	1.43	
Unreturned ballots		85	0.17	
Turnout		51,234	84.42	▼3.18
Registered electors		60,686		
Majority		8,098	16.06	▼2.56
PKR gain from BN		Swing		?
Source(s) "RESULTS OF CONTESTED ELECTION AND STATEMENTS OF THE POLL AFTER THE OFFICIAL ADDITION OF VOTES".

Johor state election, 2013
Party	Candidate	Votes	%	∆%
BN	Maulizan Bujang	23,716	59.31	▼6.52
PAS	Kumutha Rahman	16,273	40.69	▲40.69
Total valid votes		39,989	97.87	
Total rejected ballots		835	2.04	
Unreturned ballots		37	0.10	
Turnout		40,861	87.60	▲9.57
Registered electors		46,658		
Majority		7,443	18.62	▼13.04
BN hold		Swing		
Source(s) "KEPUTUSAN PILIHAN RAYA UMUM DEWAN UNDANGAN NEGERI".

Johor state election, 2008
Party	Candidate	Votes	%	∆%
BN	Maulizan Bujang	17,005	65.83	▼20.66
PKR	Kumutha Rahman	8,827	34.17	▲34.17
Total valid votes		25,832	97.32	
Total rejected ballots		680	2.56	
Unreturned ballots		32	0.12	
Turnout		26,544	78.03	▲3.70
Registered electors		34,018		
Majority		8,178	31.66	▼41.32
BN hold		Swing		
Source(s) "KEPUTUSAN PILIHAN RAYA UMUM DEWAN UNDANGAN NEGERI PERAK BAGI TAHUN 2008".

Johor state election, 2004
Party	Candidate	Votes	%	∆%
BN	Maulizan Bujang	18,482	86.49	▼7.66
PKR	Roslani Sharif	2,887	13.51	▲13.51
Total valid votes		21,369	97.58	
Total rejected ballots		522	2.38	
Unreturned ballots		9	0.04	
Turnout		21,900	74.33	▼0.64
Registered electors		29,463		
Majority		15,595	72.98	▲15.32
BN hold		Swing		
Source(s) "KEPUTUSAN PILIHAN RAYA UMUM DEWAN UNDANGAN NEGERI PERAK BAGI TAHUN 2004".

Johor state election, 1999
Party	Candidate	Votes	%	∆%
BN	Mohamad Dolmat	22,626	78.83	▼8.45
Parti Rakyat Malaysia	Mohd Salleh Ahmad	6,076	21.17	▲21.17
Total valid votes		28,702	94.45	
Total rejected ballots		1,029	3.39	
Unreturned ballots		657	2.16	
Turnout		30,388	74.97	▼0.13
Registered electors		40,534		
Majority		16,550	57.66	▼16.90
BN hold		Swing		
Source(s) "KEPUTUSAN PILIHAN RAYA UMUM DEWAN UNDANGAN NEGERI PERAK BAGI TAHUN 1999".

Johor state election, 1995
Party	Candidate	Votes	%	∆%
BN	Ali Hassan	21,041	87.28	▲18.63
S46	Shapie Ridwan	3,066	12.72	▼18.63
Total valid votes		24,107	95.10	
Total rejected ballots		852	3.36	
Unreturned ballots		389	1.53	
Turnout		25,348	75.10	▲2.37
Registered electors		33,753		
Majority		17,975	74.56	▲38.26
BN hold		Swing		
Source(s) "KEPUTUSAN PILIHAN RAYA UMUM DEWAN UNDANGAN NEGERI PERAK BAGI TAHUN 1995".

Johor state election, 1990
Party	Candidate	Votes	%	∆%
BN	Ali Hassan	15,987	68.65	▼6.75
S46	Mohd Shafbly Yahya	7,302	32.35	▲32.35
Total valid votes		23,289	94.30	
Total rejected ballots		1,408	5.70	
Unreturned ballots		0	0.00	
Turnout		24,697	72.73	▲6.74
Registered electors		33,957		
Majority		8,685	36.30	▼14.50
BN hold		Swing		
Source(s) "KEPUTUSAN PILIHAN RAYA UMUM DEWAN UNDANGAN NEGERI PERAK BAGI TAHUN 1990".

Johor state election, 1986
Party	Candidate	Votes	%	∆%
BN	Ali Hassan	13,023	75.40	▼2.69
Parti Rakyat Malaysia	Mohd Amin Ahmad	4,249	24.60	▲24.60
Total valid votes		17,272	89.25	
Total rejected ballots		2,080	10.75	
Unreturned ballots		0	0.00	
Turnout		19,352	65.99	
Registered electors		29,326		
Majority		8,774	50.80	
BN hold		Swing		
Source(s) "KEPUTUSAN PILIHAN RAYA UMUM DEWAN UNDANGAN NEGERI PERAK BAGI TAHUN 1986".

Johor state election, 1982
Party	Candidate	Votes	%	∆%
BN	Mohamed Ali Hassan	20,369	78.09	▼7.85
Parti Sosialis Rakyat Malaysia	Gurdial Singh Nijar Sadu Singh	5,715	21.91	▲21.91
Total valid votes		26,084	100.00	
Total rejected ballots		1,217		
Unreturned ballots		0		
Turnout		27,301	76.06	▼2.87
Registered electors		35,892		
Majority		14,654	56.18	▼15.69
BN hold		Swing		

Johor state election, 1978
Party	Candidate	Votes	%	∆%
BN	Jaafar Hamzah	16,327	85.94	
PAS	Ahmad Kintan	2,672	14.06	
Total valid votes		18,999	100.00	
Total rejected ballots		1,778		
Unreturned ballots		0		
Turnout		20,777	78.93	▲78.93
Registered electors		26,323		
Majority		13,655	71.87	▲71.87
BN hold		Swing		

Johor state election, 1974
Party	Candidate	Votes	%
On the nomination day, Hasnah Ahmad won uncontested.
BN	Hasnah Ahmad		
Total valid votes			
Total rejected ballots			
Unreturned ballots			
Turnout			
Registered electors		18,830	
Majority			
This was a new constituency created.
