= Padang Kota =

State constituency in Penang, Malaysia

Padang Kota (N26)
Penang constituency
- Padang Kota (olive) on Penang

State constituency
- Legislature: Penang State Legislative Assembly
MLA
Chow Kon Yeow
PH
- Constituency created: 1974
- First contested: 1974
- Last contested: 2023

Demographics
- Electors (2023): 15,165
- Area (km²): 3

Padang Kota is a state constituency in Penang, Malaysia, that has been represented in the Penang State Legislative Assembly since 1974. It covers George Town's historic city centre, including its old administrative core and the central business district (CBD) at Beach Street.

The state constituency was first contested in 1974 and is mandated to return a single Assemblyman to the Penang State Legislative Assembly under the first-past-the-post voting system. Since 2008, the State Assemblyman for Padang Kota is Chow Kon Yeow from the Democratic Action Party (DAP), which is part of the state's ruling coalition, Pakatan Harapan (PH). Chow is also the current Chief Minister of Penang since 2018.

== Definition ==
=== Polling districts ===
According to the federal gazette issued on 18 July 2023, the Padang Kota constituency is divided into 14 polling districts.

State constituency	Polling districts	Code	Location
Padang Kota (N26)	Northam Road	049/26/01	SJK (C) Union
Padang Kota (N26)	Pykett Avenue	049/26/02	SJK (C) Union
Padang Kota (N26)	Rangoon Road	049/26/03	SMK (P) Methodist
Padang Kota (N26)	Nagore Road	049/26/04	SK Sri Tanjung
Padang Kota (N26)	Wellesley School	049/26/05	SK Wellesley
Padang Kota (N26)	Farquhar Street	049/26/06	SK Perempuan Island
Padang Kota (N26)	Lorong Argus	049/26/07	SMK St. Xavier
Padang Kota (N26)	Muntri Street	049/26/08	SJK (C) Shih Chung Pusat
Padang Kota (N26)	Kampong Malabar	049/26/09	SJK (C) Aik Hua
Padang Kota (N26)	Lorong Serk Chuan	049/26/10	SK Hutchings
Padang Kota (N26)	Lorong Pasar	049/26/11	SK Convent Lebuh Light
Padang Kota (N26)	Esplanade	049/26/12	Kolej Tingkatan Enam Hutchings
Padang Kota (N26)	Leboh Pasar	049/26/13	SK Convent Lebuh Light
Padang Kota (N26)	Leboh Ah Quee	049/26/14	SK Hutchings

This state seat encompasses the historic epicentre of George Town, including much of the city's UNESCO World Heritage Site. The colonial-era civic precinct, centred at Light Street, is home to a number of important landmarks, such as the Penang State Assembly Building (which houses the Penang State Legislative Assembly), the City Hall and the Esplanade (Malay: Padang Kota), from which the constituency got its name. Right next to this administrative heart of George Town is the city's CBD at Beach Street, where several international banks and financial services are based.

Other famous landmarks within this constituency include, but not limited to, Fort Cornwallis, Queen Victoria Memorial Clock Tower, St. George's Church, Church of the Assumption, Kapitan Keling Mosque, Kong Hock Keong Temple, Sri Mahamariamman Temple and Eastern & Oriental Hotel. In addition, the city's vital transportation hubs at Weld Quay, such as Swettenham Pier, the ferry terminal and the adjacent Rapid Penang public bus terminal, are situated within this state seat.

As well as the UNESCO World Heritage Site, the state seat also covers more modern parts of the city centre, especially around the vicinity of Northam Road. Jalan Pangkor and Jalan Perak form the constituency's western limits, while to the south, the Padang Kota constituency is bounded by (from west to east) Macalister Road, Jalan Zainal Abidin (formerly Yahudi Road), Burmah Road, Transfer Road, Campbell Street, Armenian Street, a mid-section of Beach Street and China Street Ghaut.

== Demographics ==
Ethnic breakdown of Padang Kota's electorate as of 2023
1. Chinese (72.6%)
2. Indian (18.5%)
3. Malay (8.03%)
4. Other ethnicities (0.90%)

Total electors by polling district in 2016
Polling district	Electors
Esplanade	1,283
Farquhar Street	703
Kampong Malabar	912
Leboh Ah Quee	528
Leboh Pasar	1,013
Lorong Argus	563
Lorong Pasar	1,000
Lorong Seck Chuan	870
Muntri Street	713
Nagore Road	2,105
Northam Road	1,417
Pykett Avenue	1,246
Rangoon Road	1,335
Wellesley School	1,165
Total	14,853
Source: Malaysian Election Commission

== History ==
Due to its importance as the heart of George Town, the Padang Kota state constituency has become a key battleground for many of the top political leaders throughout Penang's modern history. For instance, the Padang at Esplanade serves as the main venue in George Town where large-scale political rallies are held; political heavyweights, such as Lee Kuan Yew, Lim Chong Eu and Lim Kit Siang have made crowd-pulling speeches in the past at the former parade ground. Notably, Lim Chong Eu, a founder of Gerakan, held this seat during his tenure as the Chief Minister of Penang between 1974 and 1990, only to lose the seat to Lim Kit Siang of the DAP in the 1990 State Election.

At the time of writing, the Padang Kota constituency has been held since 2008 by Chow Kon Yeow, who also holds the position of the DAP Penang State Chairman. In 2018, Chow became Penang's fifth Chief Minister, succeeding his party colleague, Lim Guan Eng.

Penang State Legislative Assemblyman for Padang Kota
Assembly	No	Years	Member	Party
Constituency created from Tanjong Utara, Tanjong Tengah and Kota
4th	N22	1974 – 1978	Lim Chong Eu (林苍祐)	BN (GERAKAN)
5th	N22	1978 – 1982	Lim Chong Eu (林苍祐)	BN (GERAKAN)
6th	N22	1982 – 1986	Lim Chong Eu (林苍祐)	BN (GERAKAN)
7th	N22	1986 – 1990	Lim Chong Eu (林苍祐)	BN (GERAKAN)
8th	N22	1990 – 1995	Lim Kit Siang (林吉祥)	GR (DAP)
9th	N22	1995 – 1999	Teng Chang Yeow (邓章耀)	BN (GERAKAN)
10th	N22	1999 – 2004	Teng Chang Yeow (邓章耀)	BN (GERAKAN)
11th	N26	2004 – 2008	Teng Chang Yeow (邓章耀)	BN (GERAKAN)
12th	N26	2008 – 2013	Chow Kon Yeow (曹观友)	PR (DAP)
13th	N26	2013 – 2015	Chow Kon Yeow (曹观友)	PR (DAP)
13th	N26	2015 – 2018	Chow Kon Yeow (曹观友)	PH (DAP)
14th	N26	2018 – 2023	Chow Kon Yeow (曹观友)	PH (DAP)
15th	N26	2023 – present	Chow Kon Yeow (曹观友)	PH (DAP)

== Election results ==
The electoral results for the Padang Kota state constituency are as follows.

Penang state election, 2023: Padang Kota
Party	Candidate	Votes	%	∆%
PH	Chow Kon Yeow	8,261	87.83	▲2.08
PN	H'ng Khoon Leng	1,145	12.17	▲12.17
Total valid votes		9,406	100.00	
Total rejected ballots		79		
Unreturned ballots		16		
Turnout		9,501	62.65	▼13.06
Registered electors		15,165		
Majority		7,116	75.66	▲3.50
PH hold		Swing		

Penang state election, 2018: Padang Kota
Party	Candidate	Votes	%	∆%
PKR	Chow Kon Yeow	9,278	85.75	▲85.75
BN	H'ng Khoon Leng	1,470	13.59	▼6.25
BERSAMA	Goh Saik Wei	71	0.66	▲0.66
Total valid votes		10,819	100.00	
Total rejected ballots		130		
Unreturned ballots		12		
Turnout		10,961	75.71	▼2.84
Registered electors		14,476		
Majority		7,808	72.16	▲11.84
PKR hold		Swing		
Source(s) "His Majesty's Government Gazette - Notice of Contested Election, State Legislative Assembly for the State of Penang [P.U. (B) 252/2018]" (PDF). Attorney General's Chambers of Malaysia. 3 May 2018. "Federal Government Gazette - Results of Contested Election and Statements of the Poll after the Official Addition of Votes, State Constituencies for the State of Penang [P.U. (B) 326/2018]" (PDF). Attorney General's Chambers of Malaysia. 28 May 2018. Archived from the original (PDF) on August 29, 2019.

Penang state election, 2013: Padang Kota
Party	Candidate	Votes	%	∆%
DAP	Chow Kon Yeow	9,563	80.16	▲22.77
BN	Oh Tong Keong	2,367	19.84	▼22.77
Total valid votes		11,930	100.00	
Total rejected ballots		128		
Unreturned ballots		19		
Turnout		12,077	78.55	▲9.65
Registered electors		15,375		
Majority		7,196	60.32	▲45.54
PH hold		Swing		
Source(s) "Federal Government Gazette - Notice of Contested Election, State Legislative Assembly for the State of Penang [P.U. (B) 189/2013]" (PDF). Attorney General's Chambers of Malaysia. 26 April 2013. "Federal Government Gazette - Results of Contested Election and Statements of the Poll after the Official Addition of Votes, State Constituencies for the State of Penang [P.U. (B) 230/2013]" (PDF). Attorney General's Chambers of Malaysia. 22 May 2013. Archived from the original (PDF) on 22 March 2019.

Penang state election, 2008: Padang Kota
Party	Candidate	Votes	%	∆%
DAP	Chow Kon Yeow	6,449	57.39	▲17.26
BN	Teng Chang Yeow	4,788	42.61	▼17.26
Total valid votes		11,237	100.00	
Total rejected ballots		220		
Unreturned ballots		50		
Turnout		11,507	68.90	▲5.24
Registered electors		16,704		
Majority		1,661	14.78	▼4.96
DAP gain from BN		Swing		.

Penang state election, 2004: Padang Kota
Party	Candidate	Votes	%	
BN	Teng Chang Yeow	6,838	59.87	▲3.07
DAP	Chow Kon Yeow	4,584	40.13	▼3.07
Total valid votes		11,422	100.00	
Total rejected ballots		233		
Unreturned ballots		0		
Turnout		11,655	63.66	▼1.42
Registered electors		18,308		
Majority		2,254	19.73	▲6.14
BN hold		Swing		

Penang state election, 1999: Padang Kota
Party	Candidate	Votes	%	∆%
BN	Teng Chang Yeow	6,851	56.80	▼2.81
DAP	Chow Kon Yeow	5,211	43.20	▲2.81
Total valid votes		12,062	100.00	
Total rejected ballots		267		
Unreturned ballots		0		
Turnout		12,329	65.08	▼2.72
Registered electors		18,943		
Majority		1,640	13.60	▼5.63
BN hold		Swing		

Penang state election, 1995: Padang Kota
Party	Candidate	Votes	%	∆%
BN	Teng Chang Yeow	7,939	59.61	▲12.57
DAP	Karpal Singh Ram Singh	5,379	40.39	▼12.57
Total valid votes		13,318	100.00	
Total rejected ballots		213		
Unreturned ballots		88		
Turnout		13,619	67.80	▼4.74
Registered electors		20,086		
Majority		2,560	19.22	▲13.30
BN gain from DAP		Swing		-

Penang state election, 1990: Padang Kota
Party	Candidate	Votes	%	∆%
DAP	Lim Kit Siang	6,317	52.96	▲8.65
BN	Lim Chong Eu	5,611	47.04	▼8.65
Total valid votes		11,928	100.00	
Total rejected ballots		293		
Unreturned ballots		69		
Turnout		12,290	72.55	▲2.85
Registered electors		16,941		
Majority		706	5.92	▼5.46
DAP gain from BN		Swing		-

Penang state election, 1986: Padang Kota
Party	Candidate	Votes	%	∆%
BN	Lim Chong Eu	6,426	55.69	▼20.18
DAP	Wong Hang Yoke	5,113	44.31	▲20.18
Total valid votes		11,539	100.00	
Total rejected ballots		291		
Unreturned ballots		0		
Turnout		11,830	69.69	▼3.82
Registered electors		16,974		
Majority		1,313	11.38	▼40.37
BN hold		Swing		

Penang state election, 1982: Padang Kota
Party	Candidate	Votes	%	∆%
BN	Lim Chong Eu	9,151	75.87	▲23.82
DAP	Lee Pi Cheang	2,910	24.13	▼20.17
Total valid votes		12,061	100.00	
Total rejected ballots		269		
Unreturned ballots		0		
Turnout		12,330	73.52	▼4.06
Registered electors		16,772		
Majority		6,241	51.75	▲43.99
BN hold		Swing		

Penang state election, 1978: Padang Kota
Party	Candidate	Votes	%	∆%
BN	Lim Chong Eu	6,137	52.05	▼2.90
DAP	Wong Hoong Keat	5,223	44.30	▲11.55
Independent	Gan Kah Peng	323	2.74	▲2.74
SDP	T.B.A. Peter	108	0.92	▲0.92
Total valid votes		11,791	100.00	
Total rejected ballots		414		
Unreturned ballots		0		
Turnout		12,205	77.58	▼1.24
Registered electors		15,733		
Majority		914	7.75	▼14.45
BN hold		Swing		

Penang state election, 1974: Padang Kota
Party	Candidate	Votes	%	∆%
BN	Lim Chong Eu	5,543	54.95	▼22.32
DAP	Khoo Soo Giap	3,303	32.74	▲32.74
PEKEMAS	Tan Phock Kin	936	9.28	▲9.28
Parti Sosialis Rakyat Malaysia	Lee Kok Liang	306	3.03	▲3.03
Total valid votes		10,088	100.00	
Total rejected ballots		297		
Unreturned ballots		0		
Turnout		10,385	78.81	▲3.18
Registered electors		13,177		
Majority		2,240	22.20	▼34.45
This was a new constituency created.

== See also ==
- Constituencies of Penang
