= Jimmy Puah Wee Tse =

Malaysian politician and lawyer

Yang Berhormat Tuan Jimmy Puah Wee Tse MP
- 潘伟斯

Member of the Johor State Executive Council
- In office 16 May 2018 – 27 February 2020 (International Trade, Investment and Utilities)
- Monarch: Ibrahim Ismail
- Menteri Besar: Osman Sapian (2018–2019); Sahruddin Jamal (2019–2020)
- Preceded by: Tee Siew Kiong
- Succeeded by: Chong Fat Full (International Trade); Mohd Izhar Ahmad (Investment and Utilities)
- Constituency: Bukit Batu

Member of the Malaysian Parliament for Tebrau
- Incumbent
- Assumed office 19 November 2022
- Preceded by: Steven Choong Shiau Yoon (PH–PKR)
- Majority: 30,720 (2022)

Member of the Johor State Legislative Assembly for Bukit Batu
- In office 5 May 2013 – 12 March 2022
- Preceded by: Cheong Chin Liang (BN–GERAKAN)
- Succeeded by: Arthur Chiong Sen Sern (PH–PKR)
- Majority: 4,015 (2013); 10,057 (2018)

Personal details
- Born: 16 September 1976 (age 49) Kulai, Johor, Malaysia
- Citizenship: Malaysian
- Party: People's Justice Party (PKR) (since 2008)
- Other political affiliations: Pakatan Harapan (PH) (since 2015); Pakatan Rakyat (PR) (2008–2015)
- Children: 2
- Occupation: Politician
- Profession: Lawyer

Jimmy Puah Wee Tse

Chinese name
- Traditional Chinese: 潘偉斯
- Simplified Chinese: 潘伟斯
Transcriptions
Standard Mandarin
- Hanyu Pinyin: Pān Wěi Sī
Yue: Cantonese
- Jyutping: Pun1 Wai5 Si1
Southern Min
- Hokkien POJ: Phoaⁿ Úi-su
- Tâi-lô: Phuann Uí-su

Jimmy Puah Wee Tse is a Malaysian politician and lawyer who has served as the Member of Parliament (MP) for Tebrau since November 2022. He served as a Member of the Johor State Executive Council (EXCO) in the Pakatan Harapan (PH) state administration under former Menteris Besar Osman Sapian and Sahruddin Jamal from May 2018 to the collapse of the PH state administration in February 2020i and Member of the Johor State Legislative Assembly (MLA) for Bukit Batu from May 2013 to March 2022. He is a member and Division Chief of Pulai of the People's Justice Party (PKR), a component party of the PH and formerly Pakatan Rakyat (PR) coalitions.

== Election results ==
Parliament of Malaysia
Year	Constituency	Candidate	Votes	Pct	Opponent(s)	Votes	Pct	Ballots cast	Majority	Turnout
2022	P158 Tebrau	Jimmy Puah Wee Tse (PKR)	83,959	49.99%	Mohamad Isa Mohamad Basir (BERSATU)	53,239	31.70%	167,965	30,720	75.22%
2022	P158 Tebrau	Jimmy Puah Wee Tse (PKR)	83,959	49.99%	Nicole Wong Siaw Ting (MCA)	30,767	18.32%	167,965	30,720	75.22%

Johor State Legislative Assembly
Year	Constituency	Candidate	Votes	Pct	Opponent(s)	Votes	Pct	Ballots cast	Majority	Turnout
2013	N51 Bukit Batu	Jimmy Puah Wee Tse (PKR)	11,676	59.83%	Cheong Chin Liang (Gerakan)	7,661	39.26%	20,007	4,015	90.00%
2013	N51 Bukit Batu	Jimmy Puah Wee Tse (PKR)	11,676	59.83%	Surendiran Kuppayah (IND)	177	0.91%	20,007	4,015	90.00%
2018	N51 Bukit Batu	Jimmy Puah Wee Tse (PKR)	17,105	65.68%	Teo Lee Ho (Gerakan)	7,048	27.07%	26,400	10,057	87.40%
2018	N51 Bukit Batu	Jimmy Puah Wee Tse (PKR)	17,105	65.68%	Juwahir Amin (PAS)	1,888	7.25%	26,400	10,057	87.40%

== Honours ==
=== Honours of Malaysia ===
- Malaysia
  - Recipient of the 17th Yang di-Pertuan Agong Installation Medal (2024)
