= Malaysian United People's Party =

Malaysian United People's Party ~ Sasa United Party of Malaysia
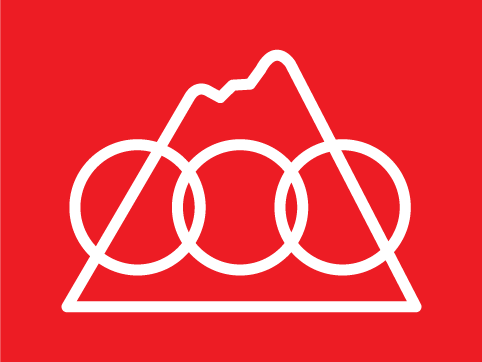
- Malay name: Parti Rakyat Bersatu Malaysia
- Abbreviation: MUPP
- President: Roy Nazry Shuhhaiddein
- Founder: Shuhhaiddein Langkap
- Founded: 23 March 2011
- Legalised: 0
- Dissolved: 0
- Preceded by: United Democratic Sabah People's Power Party (SETIA)
- Headquarters: Kota Kinabalu
- Youth wing: 0
- Membership (2013): 564,790 people
- Ideology: Nationalism
- Political position: Right-wing
- Religion: 0
- National affiliation: ms:Blok Progresof
- International affiliation: 0
- Colours: Red, white
- dewan negara: 0
- dewan rakyat: 0
- dewan undangan negeri: 0
- dewan negara: 0
- dewan rakyat: 0
- dewan undangan negeri: 0

Election symbol
- logo GTA.png

Party flag
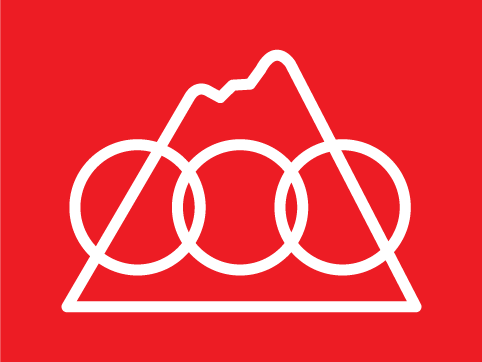

Website
- 0

The Malaysia United People's Party (Malay: Parti Bersatu Sasa Malaysia; abbrev: MUPP) is a political party in Malaysia.

Originally known as Parti Demokratik Setiahati Kuasa Rakyat Bersatu Sabah (SETIA), the party changed its name after it extended to Peninsular Malaysia on 23 March 2011.

== History ==
The Malaysia United People's Party (MUPP), also known as Parti Bersatu Sasa Malaysia (BERSAMA), is a political party in Malaysia. It was originally founded as the United Sabah People's Power Democratic Party (SETIA) in 1994 by Shuhaiddin Langkap in Sabah.

SETIA was established as an opposition party with a Bumiputera-centric platform, aiming to represent the interests of indigenous communities. However, its membership was open to all ethnic groups, and its leadership included representatives from various backgrounds. The party contested in Sabah state elections, advocating for political and economic empowerment, particularly for marginalized communities.

On March 23, 2011, the party underwent a rebranding and was renamed Parti Bersatu Sasa Malaysia (BERSAMA) as it expanded its presence beyond Sabah to Peninsular Malaysia. This change marked an effort to become a national-level political entity, broadening its focus beyond regional issues to address national concerns.

== Political Position and Influence ==
BERSAMA positioned itself as a multiracial and multi-regional party, seeking to bridge the gap between Sabah, Sarawak, and Peninsular Malaysia. The party’s ideology emphasized:

National unity and equal representation for all ethnicities. Empowerment of marginalized communities, particularly in East Malaysia. Good governance and economic justice. Despite its expansion, BERSAMA has remained a smaller political party compared to Malaysia's major coalitions. It has contested in state and general elections, advocating for greater political autonomy for Sabah and Sarawak, as well as national unity.

== Recent Developments ==
While the party has not played a dominant role in Malaysia’s mainstream politics, it continues to engage in political discourse, advocating for policies that benefit its support base. Its participation in elections and political alliances, if any, reflect its evolving role in Malaysia’s political landscape.

== General election results ==
Election	Total seats won	Seats contested	Total votes	Voting Percentage	Outcome of election	Election leader
2013	0 / 222	5	257	0.00%	; No representation in Parliament	Roy Nazry

=== State assemblies ===
State assembly	Election	Votes	%	Seats	Won/contested	+/–	Position (Note: As part of electoral coalition.)	Status
Perlis	2022	Did not contest						No seats
Kedah	2023	Did not contest						No seats
Kelantan	2023	Did not contest						No seats
Terengganu	2023	Did not contest						No seats
Penang	2023	Did not contest						No seats
Perak	2022	Did not contest						No seats
Pahang	2022	Did not contest						No seats
Selangor	2023	Did not contest						No seats
Negeri Sembilan	2026	Did not contest						No seats
Malacca	2026	Did not contest						No seats
Johor	2026	Did not contest						No seats
Sabah	2025	131	0.0	0 / 73	0 / 1	Steady	▲22nd	No seats
Sarawak	2021	Did not contest						No seats

Note

State election	State Legislative Assembly		
State election	Penang	Sabah	Total won / Total contested
2/3 majority	2 / 3	2 / 3	
2013	0 / 36	0 / 60	0 / 4
2025		0 / 73	0 / 1
