= Kampar =

Kampar may refer to:

== Indonesia ==
- Kampar Regency, Riau Province, eastern Sumatra
- Kampar River, a river in the same province

== Malaysia ==
- Kampar District, Perak
- Kampar, Perak, a town in Kampar District
- Kampar River, Malaysia, site of the 2009 Perak suspension bridge collapse

== Ships ==
- SS Kampar, a number of steamships with this name
