= Kampar, Perak =

Town in Perak, Malaysia

Kampar Kampo (Perak Malay)
- Town and district capital
- Kampar Town; Bandar Kampar
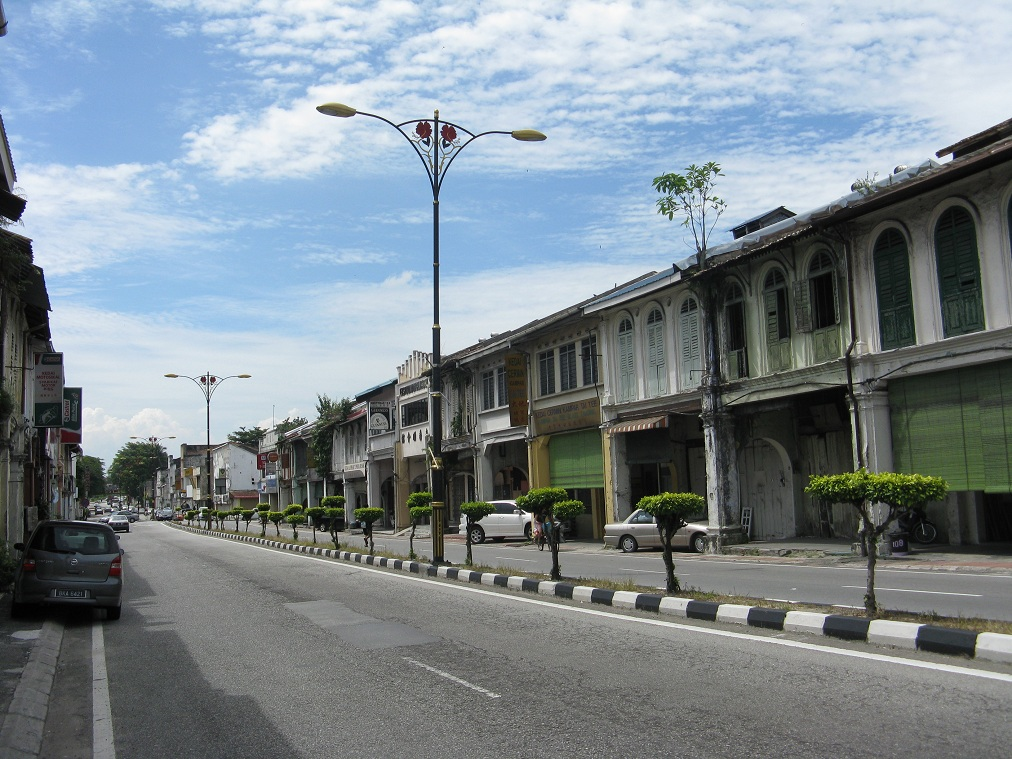
- Pre-war buildings in Kampar

- Seal
- Nickname: Education City
- Interactive map of Kampar
- Kampar in Perak Kampar (Malaysia) Kampar (Southeast Asia)
- Coordinates: 4°18′46″N 101°09′11.7″E
- Country: Malaysia
- State: Perak
- District: Kampar

Government
  - Type: District Council
  - Body: Kampar District Council
  - Yang Dipertua: Ahmad Suqairy bin Alias
- Time zone: UTC+8 (MST)
  - Summer (DST): Not observed
- Postal code: 31xxx
- National calling code: 05-4xxxxxx
- License plate prefix: A
- Website: www.mdkampar.gov.my

Kampar (Perak Malay: Kampo) is a town located in the state of Perak, Malaysia, and serves as the administrative centre of Kampar District in Perak. Founded in 1887, the town lies within the Kinta Valley, an area rich in tin reserves. It was a tin mining town which boomed during the height of the tin mining industry. Many tin towns were established in the late 19th century, flourished in the 1900s, only to stagnate and decline after World War I, with the exception of an exhilarating boom in the 1920s. Most have closed down following the collapse of the industry, especially in the late 20th century.

Kampar is 33 km south of the state capital Ipoh, well connected by both Federal Route 1 and the KTM West Coast railway line.

== Geography ==
Kampar is situated in the Kinta Valley, which was well known for its high tin ore reserves. Its vast surroundings as well as abandoned mining-ponds are suitable for fishing, which has become a major attraction for anglers around the country, especially from Kuala Lumpur.

Kampar town can be broadly divided between the 'old town' and 'new town' areas. The old town consists of two main streets, Jalan Gopeng and Jalan Idris, of charming pre-war shop houses. The fronts of these shop houses still mostly resemble their original appearance. Commerce in the old town area mainly consists of coffee shops, goldsmiths and local retailers. The new town area mainly consists of new residential developments and some commerce servicing the burgeoning education industry in Kampar. On 21 May 2009, the Sultan of Perak, Sultan Azlan Shah, declared Kampar as the state's 10th district.

However, according to the residents, there is no new or old town. The 'new town' is just a residential estate with a few rows of shop-lots to cater for the growing number of university students. The term 'new town' originates from the Cantonese spoken dialect which refers to Taman Bandar Baru as new town. Whereas 'Taman' in Malaysia refers to a residential estate.

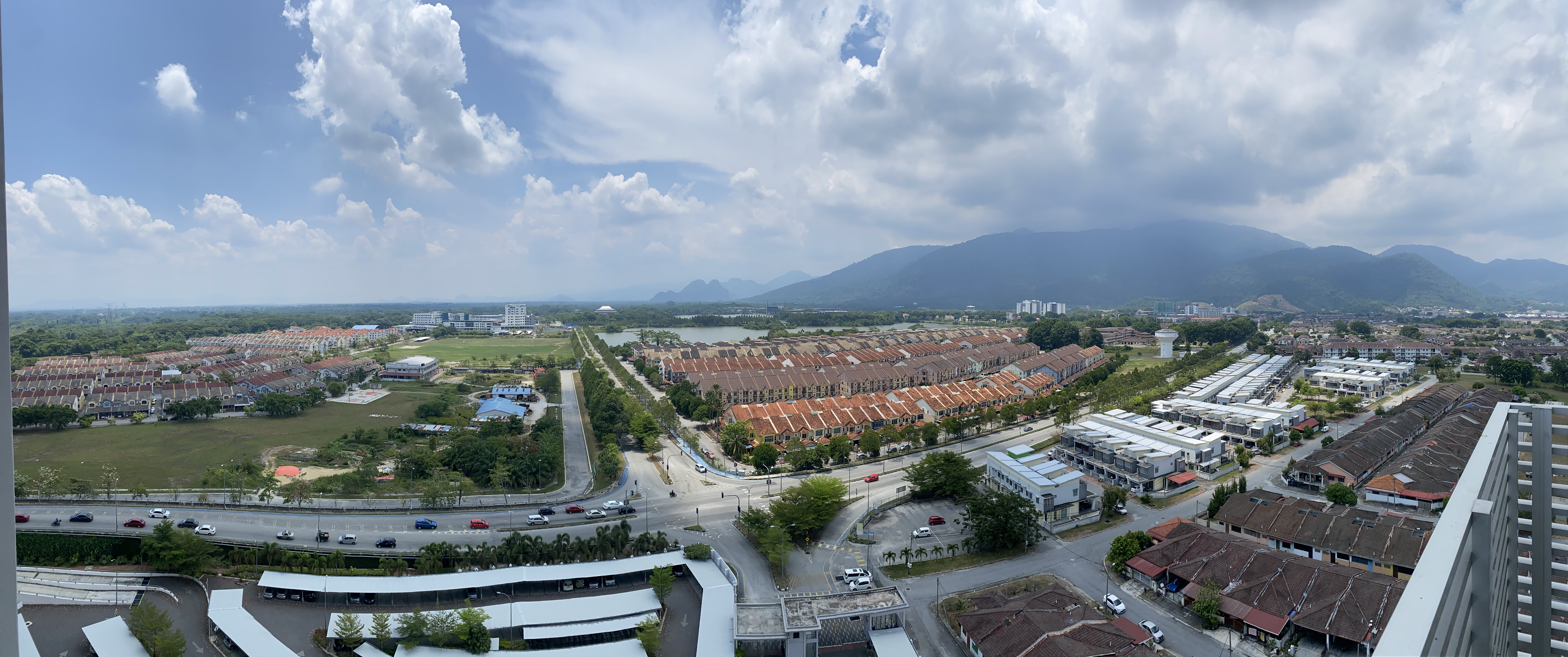
Panorama view of Kampar with UTAR can be seen in the distance

== History ==
Based on Datuk Hashim Bin Sam Abdul Latiff's article, early settlements in Kampar relate to the historic event of the murder of the British Resident in Perak, J.W.W Birch, as Ngah Jabor who was one of the early settlers in Kampar was amongst those connected to murder, together with the others who include Maharaja Lela, Datuk Sagor, Si Putum and others. However, Ngah Jabor escaped sentence when Raja Idris Shah, who later became Sultan of Perak in 1887 presided over the case involving those accused of Birch's murder in 1876.

Raja Idris Shah and Ngah Jabor have family ties and share milk mothers since as an infant, Raja Idris Shah was taken care of by Ngah Jabor's mother, which is common amongst royal families to send their children to other families, particularly amongst the aristocrats, to feed.

There is a possibility that between the years 1876 to 1886, Ngah Jabor went into hiding to equip him with spiritual skills and reappeared in public with a new identity as Mohamad Jabor. It is possible that during his hiding, he had opened a new settlement in Kampar to elude the British.

Kampar had its share of war during the Japanese Occupation between 1941 and 1945. From 30 December 1941 to 2 January 1942 the Battle of Kampar occurred. An estimated 3000 British soldiers defended the Kampar area against over 6000 Japanese soldiers. The British Army inflicted serious casualties on the Japanese and only retreated when their flank and rear was threatened by Japanese seaborne landings on the coast south of their position. This battle was documented by the famous Kampar historian, Chye Kooi Loong. (See link below)

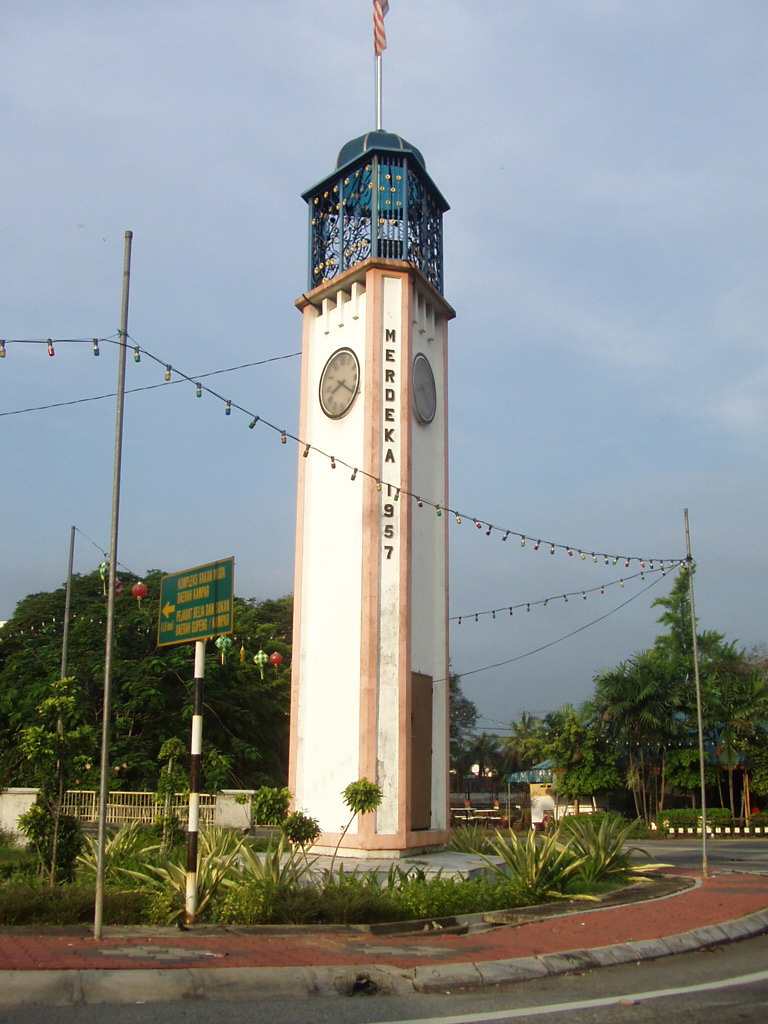
Independence Clock Tower in Kampar

=== Origin of name ===
One plausible theory is that Kampar is named after the Kampar River (north of the current township). The river itself got its name from ethnic Malay immigrants from the Kampar Regency in Riau Province, Sumatra, Indonesia, who used the river to navigate upstream and the main source of ancestry of the local Malay populace. This predates the large-scale mining of tin in Kampar, so it is likely that the Cantonese words "kam pou" were derived from the word Kampar, rather than the other way around. Curiously, Kampar Regency in Sumatra was where the 1st Sultan of Perak (Sultan Mudzaffar Shah) was based before becoming Sultan of Perak in Perak (his highness was a son of the last Sultan of Malacca).

The local Chinese community had the impression it came from the Cantonese word kam pou as it means "precious gold" (referring to the town's previously large tin reserves, because of the Chinese people also speak in Cantonese only, although there are two dialect groups of the local Chinese populace dominating this town, notably the main Cantonese majority along with the Hakkas, which constitute the two largest ethnicities of the local Chinese population).

=== Aston Settlement ===
Aston Settlement was a planned community composed of wooden houses in the northern suburbs of Kampar town. It was developed between 1935 and 1938, to "alleviate overcrowding" in Kampar's central business district. It was spearheaded, and named after, Arthur Vincent Aston, who became the first postwar British Adviser for Perak (1946–48) after the post of British Resident was abolished in 1945.

Though not related, Aston Settlement bears a resemblance to the post-war New Villages established in the 1950s.

== Demographics ==
In year 2023, Kampar had a total population of 67,593 people.

The majority of Kampar's population consists of 59.5% Chinese descent, 30.1% Bumiputera, 10.4% Indian descent and 0.3% others.

Besides that, the new residential area, Taman Bandar Baru Kampar, has a large student population from Tunku Abdul Rahman University of Management and Technology (TAR UMT) and Universiti Tunku Abdul Rahman (UTAR).

== Economy ==
In the 19th and most of the 20th century, the economy of Kampar revolved around tin-mining. However, many tin-mining companies were forced out of business during the economic recession in the 1980s. Nevertheless, the town's economy recovered, slowly, by the end of the 1980s.

Since the completion of the North–South Expressway, Kampar's status as a bustling town has declined rapidly. Travelers stopped frequenting the town as they chose the more convenient highway. The nearest exit from highway is in Gopeng and Tapah, which is convenient for travelers.

The commercial and industrial sectors are the main driving forces of Kampar's economy. More recently, its economy has been further driven by the construction of the new Universiti Tunku Abdul Rahman (UTAR) campus.

Also, Kampar is known for its freshwater fishing spot as most of the surrounding area is covered by man-made lakes. Centuries old abandoned tin mines have turned into natural lakes. Tilapia, Pangasius, Kaloi, Betutu, Tongsan, Catfish and many kinds of freshwater fish flourish abundantly in these lakes. Most of these lakes are also converted into fish farms, duck farms or other horticulture produce farms.

Before the arrival of hypermarkets, Pasaraya Minat Kampar (永顺金宝) was a popular shopping destination in Kampar, located near the now-defunct old Kampar bus station. Over the years, Kampar's retail landscape has expanded significantly. Modern hypermarkets such as Lotus's and Econsave have emerged, offering a wider range of daily necessities and grocery items.

== Education ==
Kampar is a centre of tertiary education, hosting Tunku Abdul Rahman University of Management and Technology (TAR UMT) and Universiti Tunku Abdul Rahman (UTAR). With an estimated combined capacity of more than 20,000 students, these two institutions are touted to be the two instruments that will restore the town to its former glory.

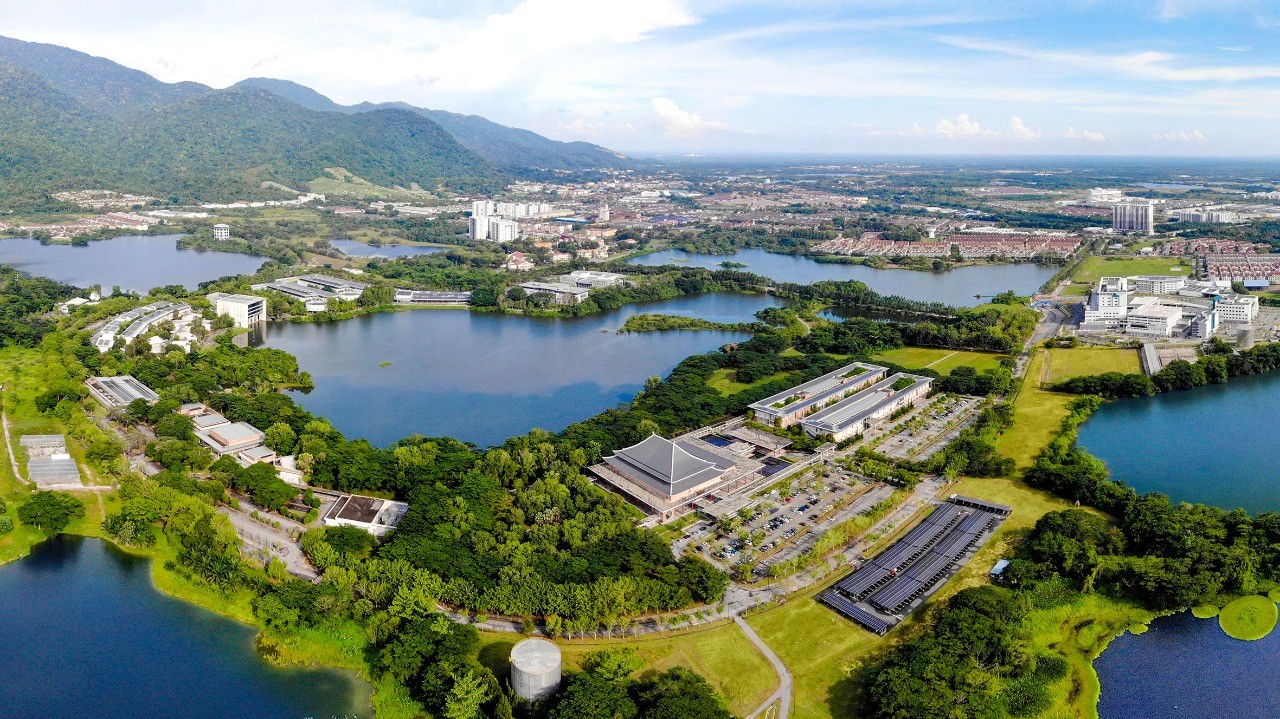
Overview of UTAR Kampar Campus

Besides that, Kampar is also served by various primary schools, secondary schools, and colleges. Notable educational institutions in Kampar include:

Government school:

- SMK Methodist (ACS) Kampar
- SK Methodist (ACS) Kampar
- SMJK Pei Yuan
- SJK (C) Pei Yuan
- SMK Kampar
- SJK (C) Kampar Girls
- SJK (C) Chung Huah
- SJK (T) Kampar
- SMK Seri Kampar
- SK De La Salle
- SMK Sentosa
- SK Kampar

Private school:

- Westlake International School
- Pei Yuan High School

College:

- Menara International College (MIC)
- Kolej Teknikal Sri Ayu (KTSA)

University:

- Universiti Tunku Abdul Rahman (UTAR)
- Tunku Abdul Rahman University of Management and Technology (TAR UMT)
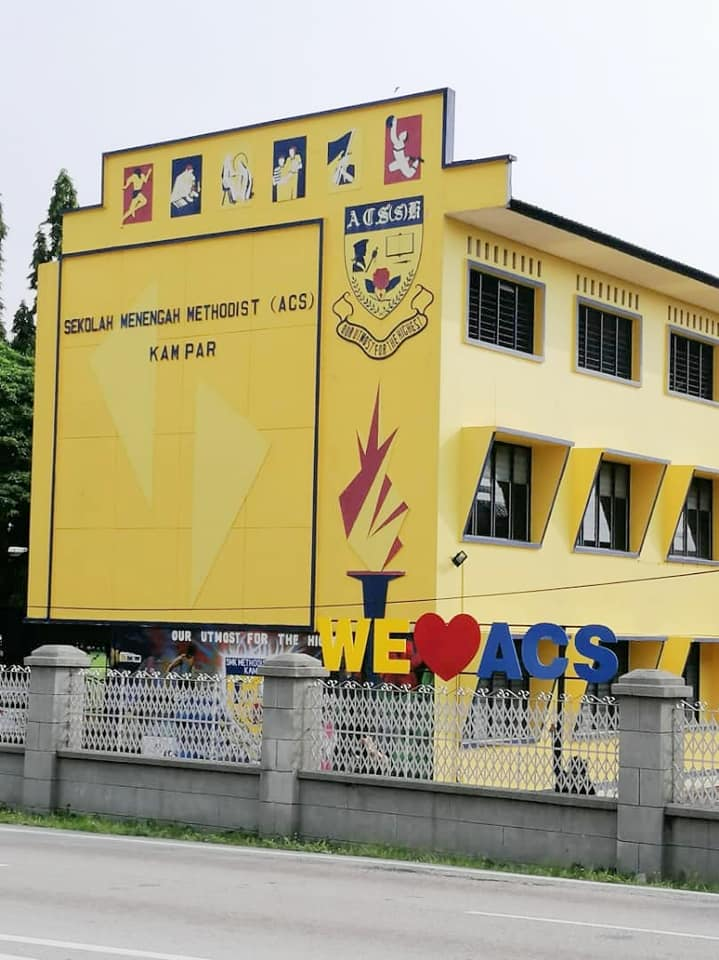
SMK Methodist (ACS) Kampar

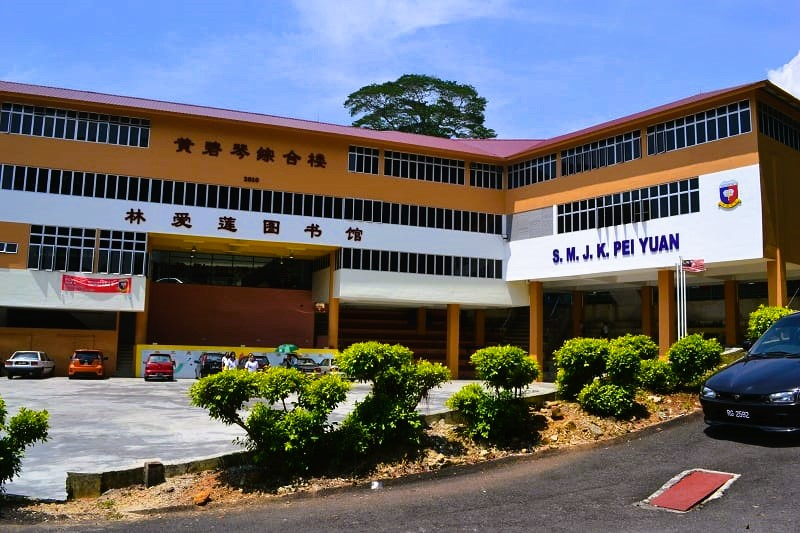
SMJK Pei Yuan

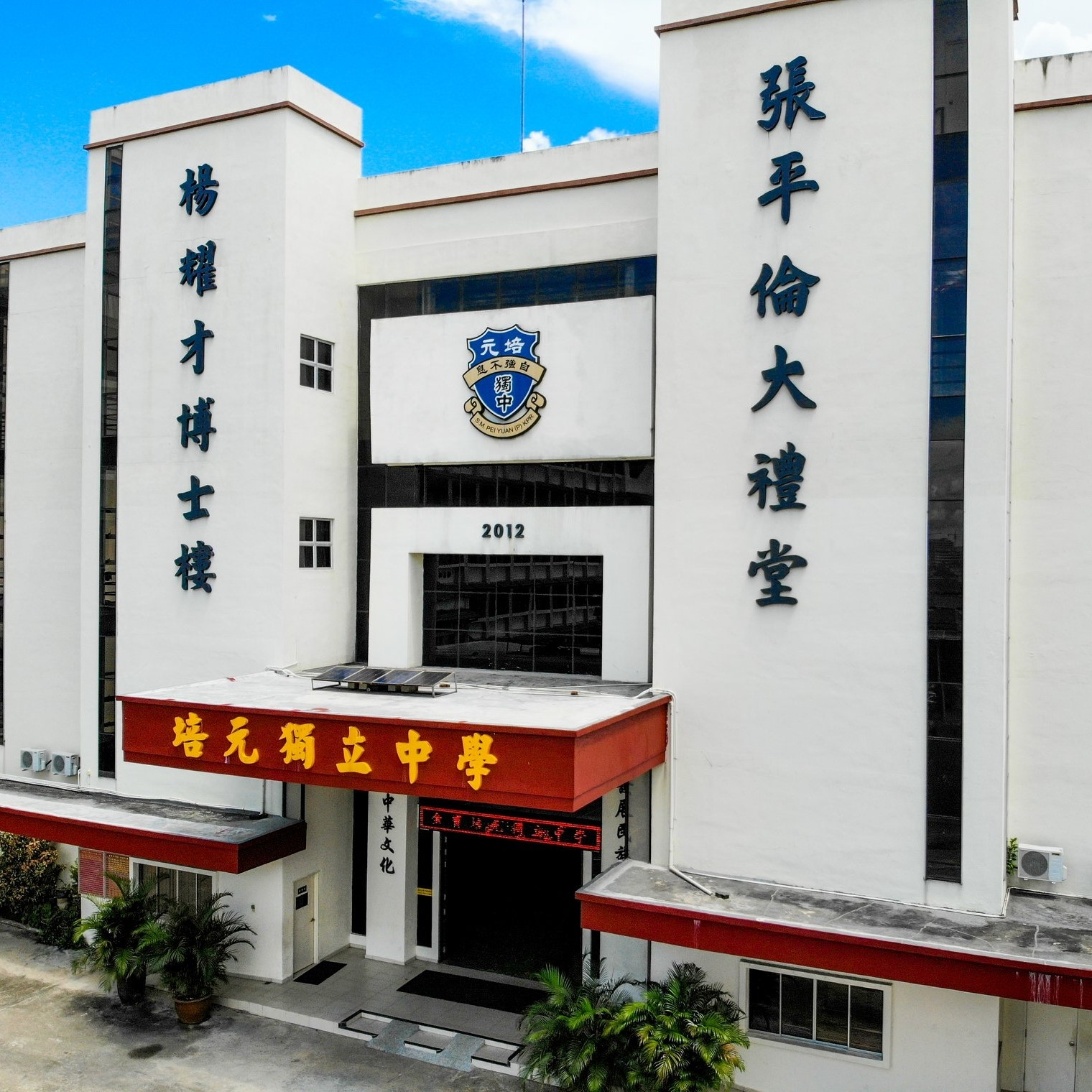
Pei Yuan High School

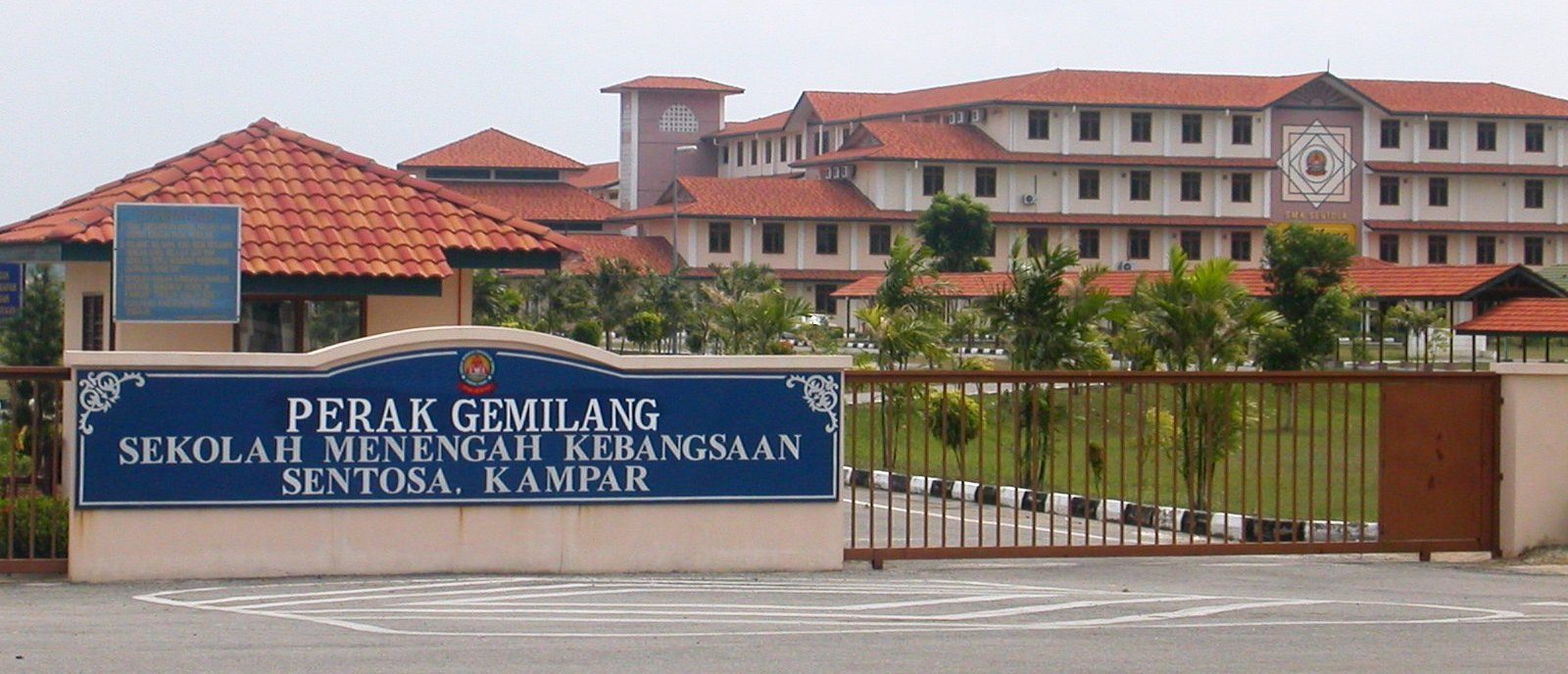
SMK Sentosa

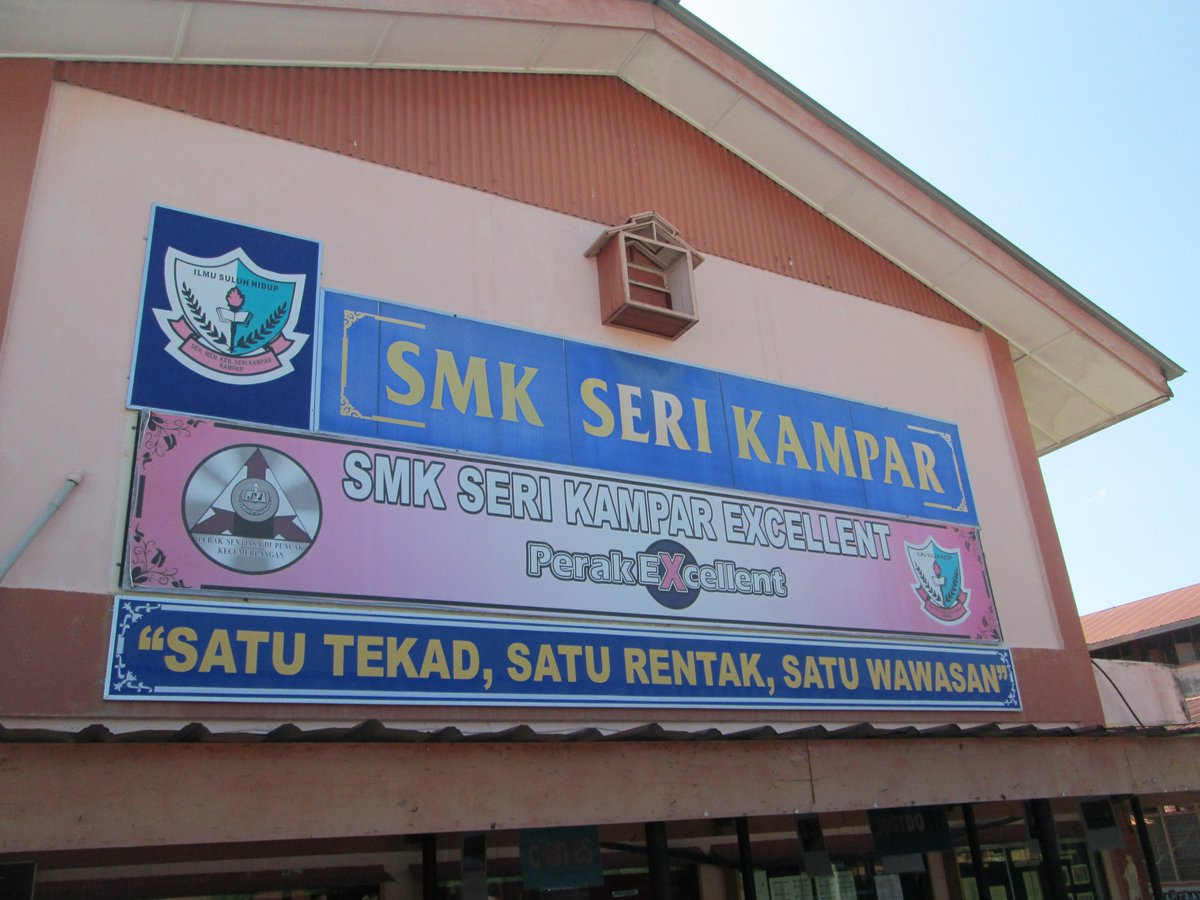
SMK Seri Kampar

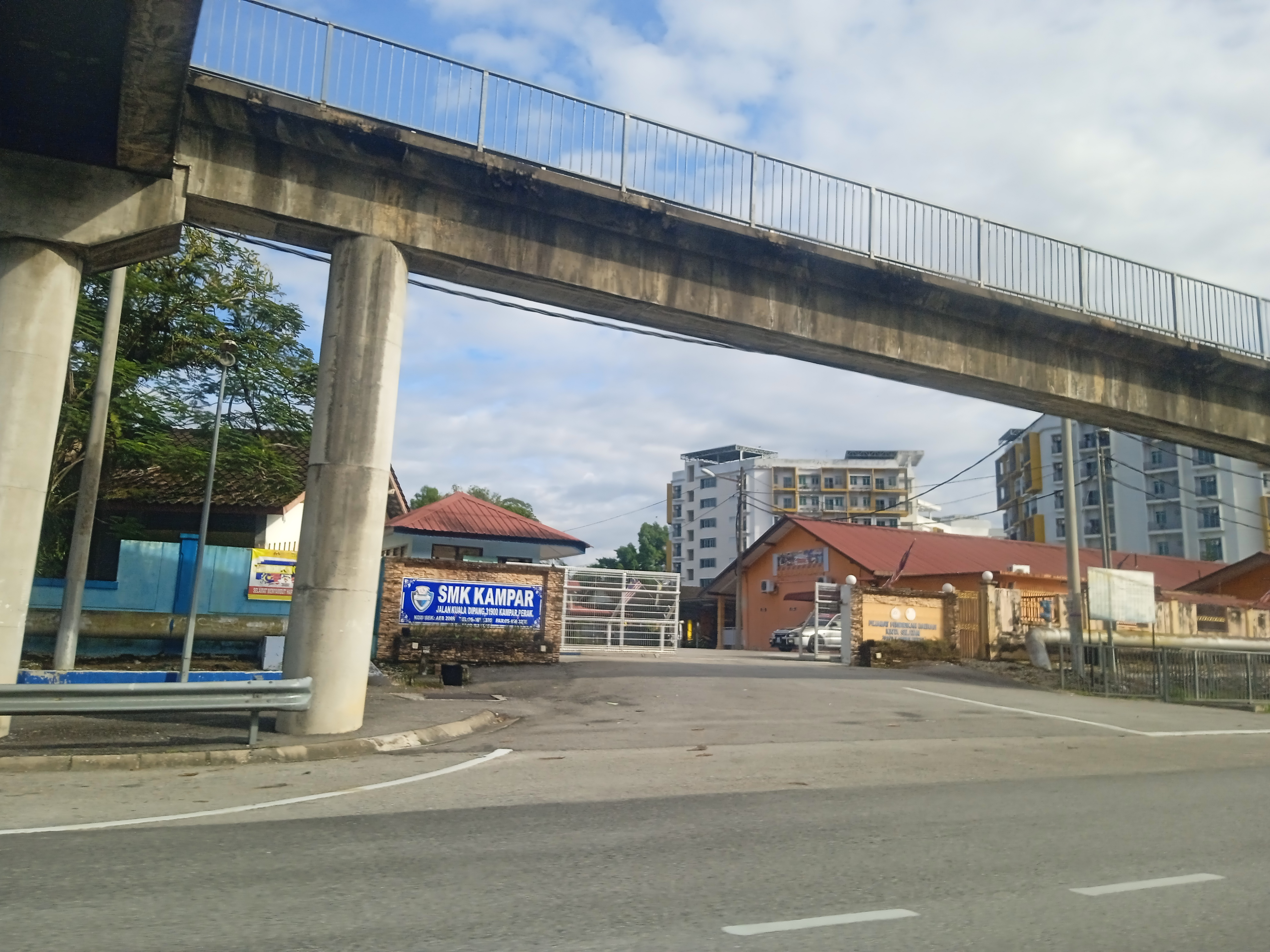
SMK Kampar

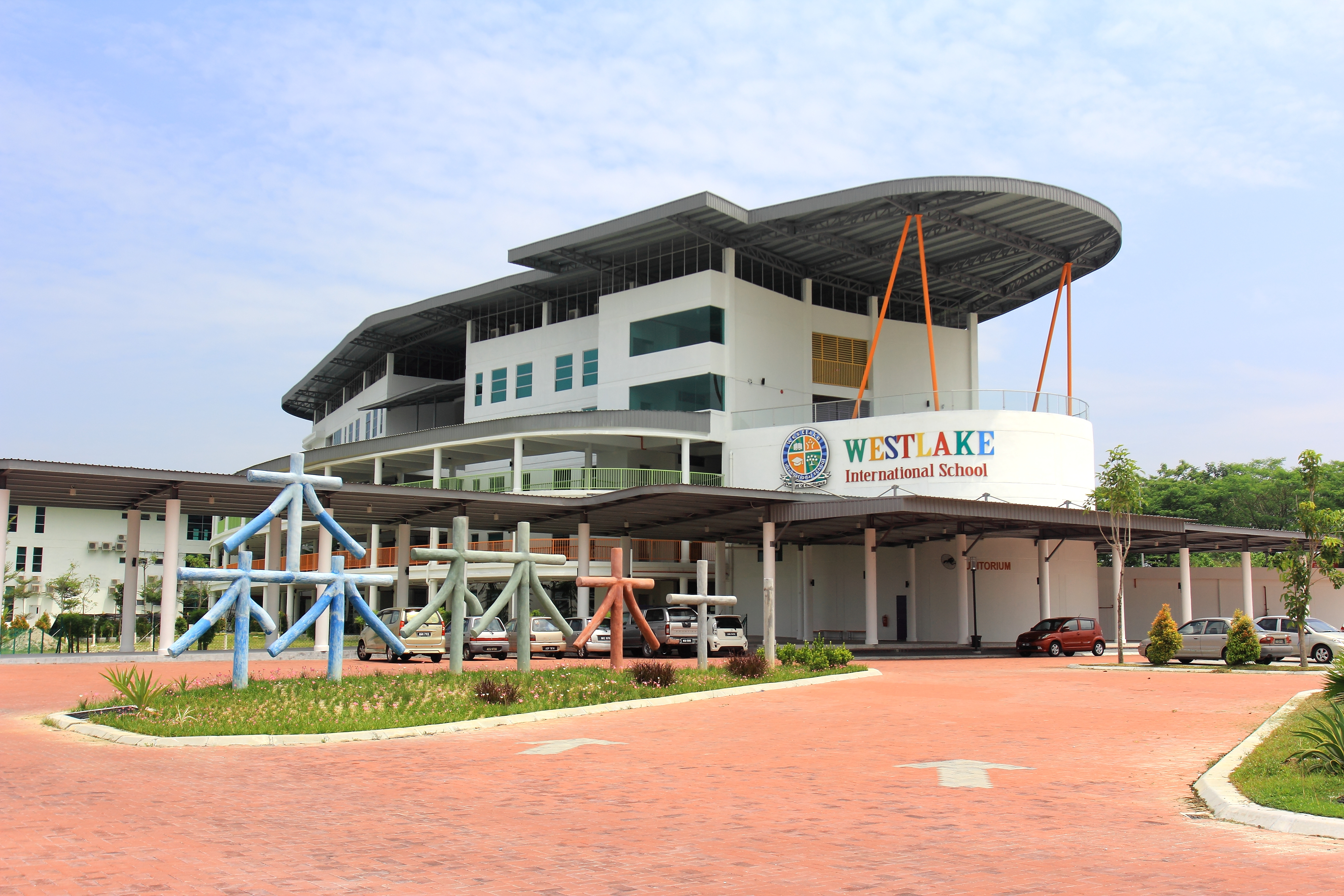
Westlake International School

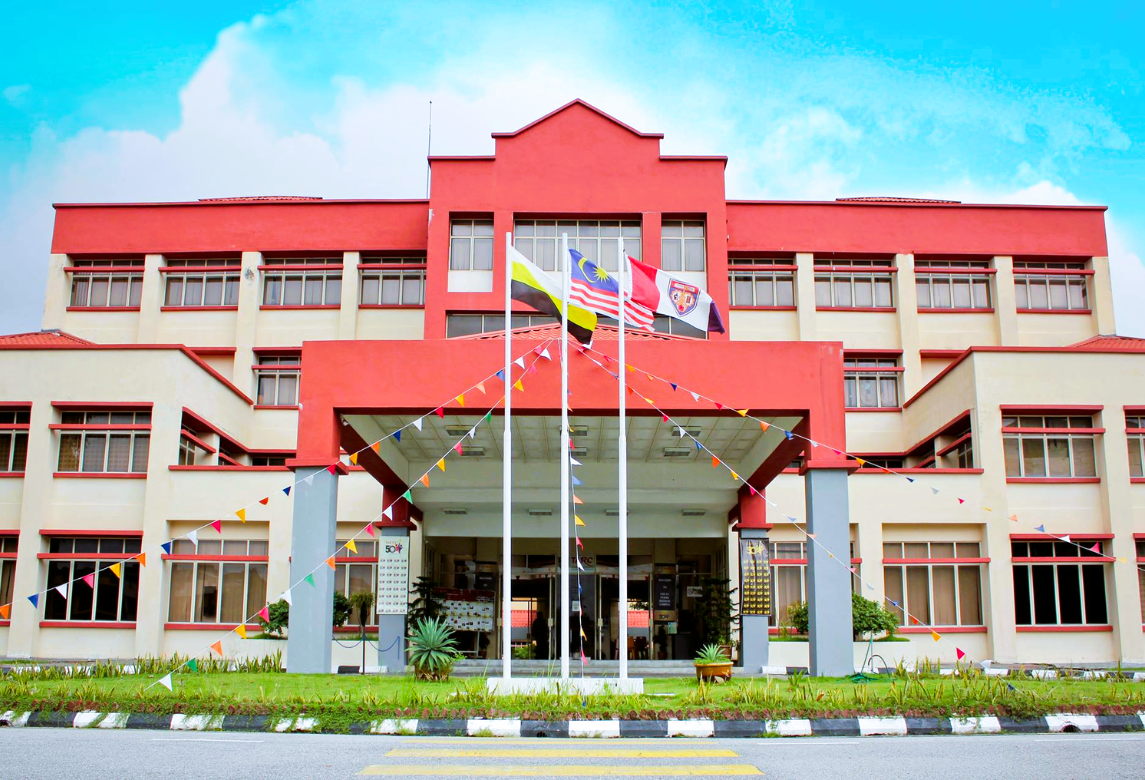
Tunku Abdul Rahman University of Management and Technology (TAR UMT)

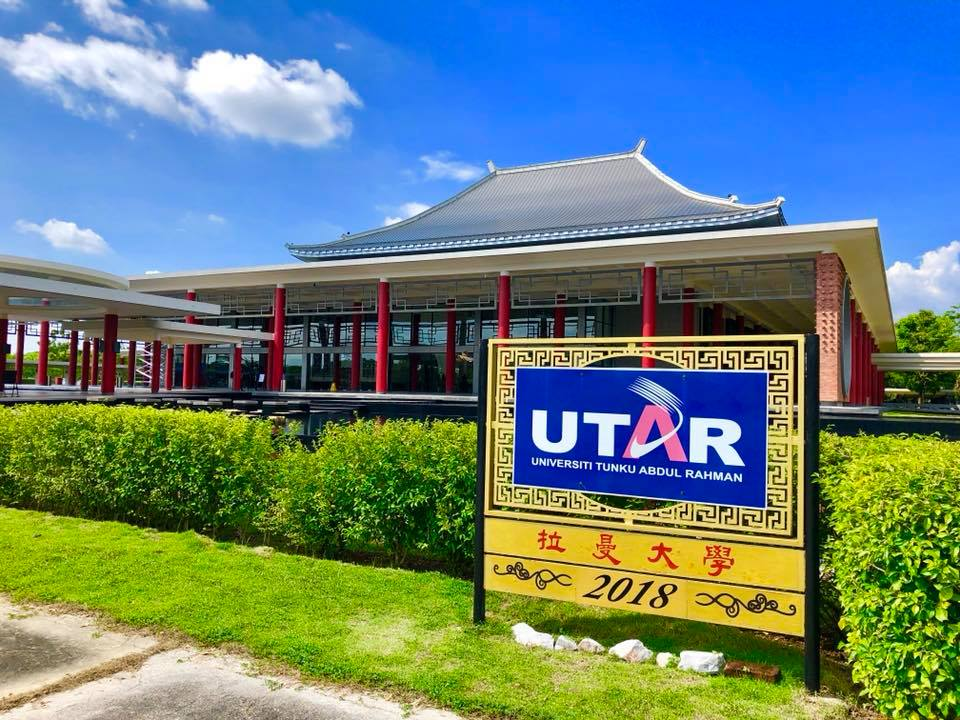
Universiti Tunku Abdul Rahman (UTAR)

== Transportation ==
Kampar Putra Bus Terminal (also known as Terminal Kampar Putra Sentral) is one of two main terminals in Kampar. It had started to operate in May 2019 to replace the old bus station in Kampar Old Town. The other terminal is Kampar Bus Terminal, which is located in the old town area. This area is known for its amazing pre-war shophouses turn coffee shops, goldsmiths and retail shops through Jalan Gopeng and Jalan Idris.

Local vicinity routes to/from Ipoh, Teluk Intan, Tapah, Malim Nawar etc are covered. Among the local bus companies that are operating in Kampar would be Perak Transit.

=== Stage Bus Route ===
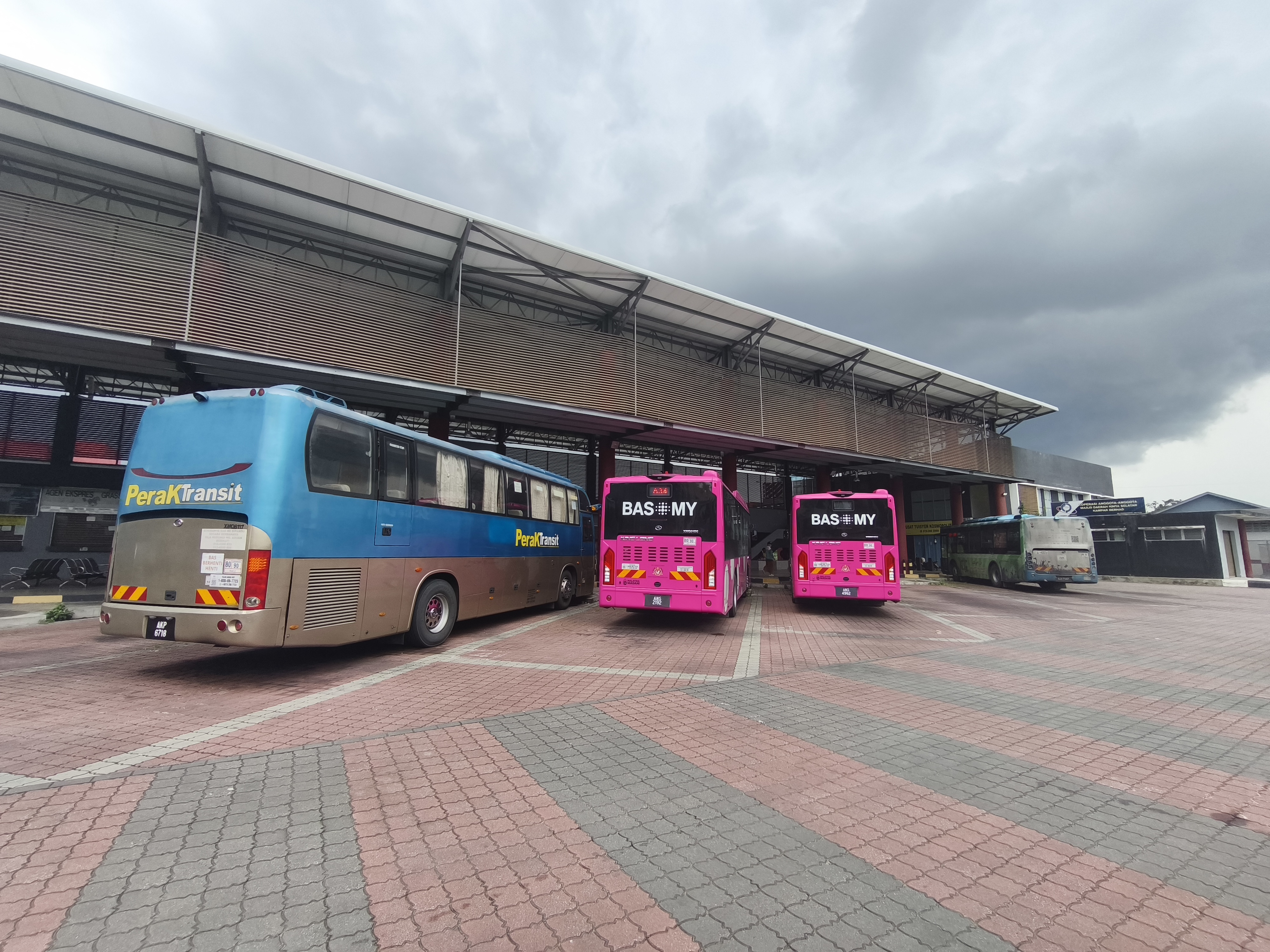
Terminal 1@Kampar at the old town

Code	Destination	Via	Operator
A34	Medan Kidd (Ipoh)	Gopeng	Perak Transit
22	Teluk Intan	Langkap	Perak Transit
31	Tapah	Chenderiang	Perak Transit
69	Malim Nawar	Tualang Sekah	Perak Transit
70	Sahom	Sungai Siput Selatan	Perak Transit
21	Tanjung Tualang	Kampung Timah	Prisma Serimas

Long distance, intercity express buses serves Kampar and has routes to Butterworth, Singapore and Kuala Lumpur. They are located in the express bus station in the town area. Express bus companies from Terminal Bersepadu Selatan (TBS), Kuala Lumpur with direct links from Kuala Lumpur to Kampar are Perak Transit, Edaran, Super Ria, Konsortium and Parit Express. Ticket prices are around RM20 one way. The bus ride takes from Kuala Lumpur to Kampar will take approximately three hours.

Universiti Tunku Abdul Rahman (UTAR) and Tunku Abdul Rahman University of Management and Technology (TAR UMT) shuttle buses are also available for pickup service of their students around the vicinity.

Keretapi Tanah Melayu (KTM) has introduced a shuttle train between Ipoh and Kuala Lumpur Sentral that serves the Kampar railway station. It would take two and a half hours between Ipoh and Kuala Lumpur Sentral. The Kampar Train Station is located at the south-eastern part of town, in the vicinity of a housing estate known as Taman Melayu Jaya.

== Notable residents ==
- Datin Paduka Seri Endon Mahmood – late wife of 5th Prime Minister of Malaysia, Abdullah Ahmad Badawi.
- Eric Moo – a Taiwan-based Mandapop singer, composer and producer, was born in a nearby suburb, Mambang Diawan.
- Olivia Lum – founder of water treatment company Hyflux in Singapore.
- Ejie Wahid – singer with 90's Malaysian pop group 'Freshies'.
- Mark Chang Mun Kee – founder of JobStreet.com.
- Datuk Seri Mohammad Nizar Jamaluddin – 10th Menteri Besar of Perak.
- Shahir AF8 – Champions of Akademi Fantasia 8's reality show in Astro television.
- Tan Sri Khoo Kay Kim – a Malaysian historian, an emeritus professor in the History Department of the University of Malaya. He is one of the co-authors of Rukun Negara. He is a highly regarded national academic for his views on local sports and socio-political issues.
- Tan Sri Hew See Tong – started Bandar Baru Kampar or Kampar New Town, a former tin miner and an elected member of the Parliament for 3 terms from 1995 to 2008 for the Kampar constituency.
- Chye Kooi Loong – world-renowned authority on the Battle of Kampar (historical battlefield site "Green Ridge") during WW2, between the British and Japanese forces from 30 December 1941 to 2 January 1942.
- Tan Sri Lim Taik Choon - Born 1929 he was a child labourer in WW2. He later became an A class ambassador for Malaysia and went to Japan, Australia and even France. Mr Lim died in 2011.
- Ange Branca - James Beard Foundation recognized restauranteur. Branca's flagship restaurant, Kampar, highlights Malaysian food and stories in Philadelphia, PA, USA

== Politics ==
(P70) Kampar is a parliamentary seat under the Election Commission of Malaysia. Under this parliamentary seat, there are 3 state seats namely (N40) Malim Nawar, (N41) Keranji and (N42) Tualang Sekah.

The parliament seat is a traditional fight between Democratic Action Party and Malaysian Chinese Association. The current Member of Parliament of Kampar is Chong Zhemin from Democratic Action Party (DAP) under Pakatan Harapan (PH).

== Food ==
Kampar is renowned for its delicious food. For example, fish ball noodles, kai zai paeng (chicken biscuit), claypot chicken rice, apam balik, lai fun, char kuey teow, wan tan mee, lor mai fan (glutinous rice), and ham kok chai (salty vegetable dumpling). The Kampar chicken biscuit is so famous that it spawned a whole series of other 'chicken biscuit' brands.

Other local cuisine includes the chee cheong fun (猪肠粉), where curry is often the preferred condiment. Chee cheong fun is a noodle made from rice flour which is steamed into sheets and chopped up into noodle like slivers. In Kampar, it is frequently served with 2 types of tofu, along with assorted fish balls or pig skin in curry. Chee cheong fun is commonly eaten for breakfast or supper where a couple of stores are set up at the local market.

The curry chicken bread (roti kari ayam in Malay, 咖喱面包鸡 `min pau kai' in Cantonese) is one of Kampar's most recognized food icon, it is famous for its original taste of curry. The chicken curry is adequately spicy and a little on the salty side. The curry chicken is wrapped beneath a layer of plastic and grease proof paper. The golden brown bread texture is soft and fluffy and combines well with the curry broth. which is often sought after by tourists.

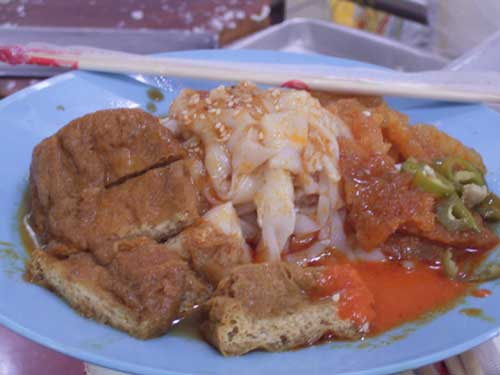
Chee Cheong Fun

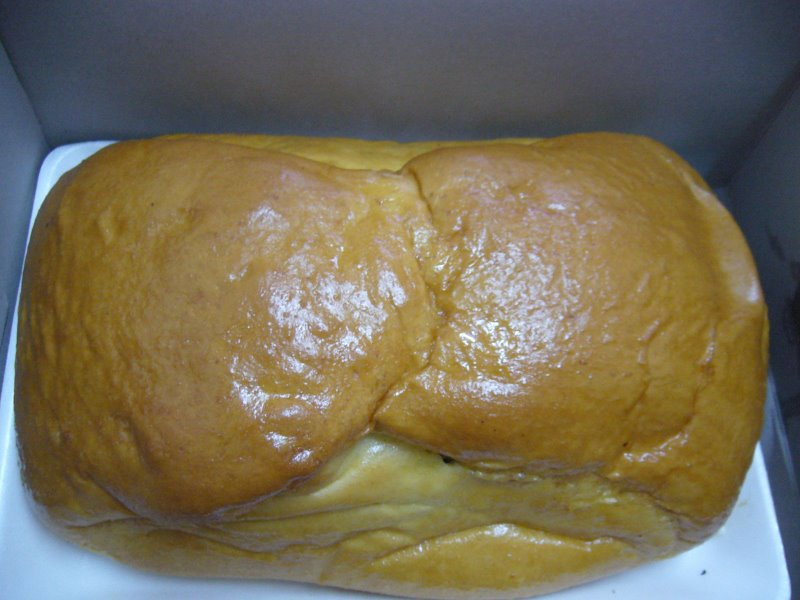
Yau Kee's Curry Chicken Bread

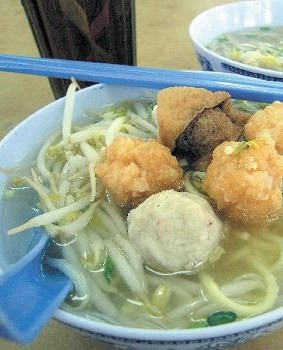
Deep-fried Fish Ball Noodles

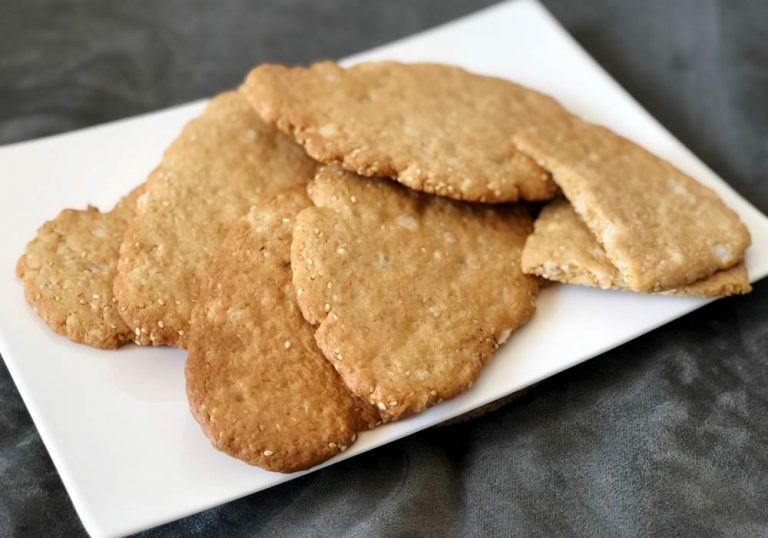
Kai Zai Paeng (Chicken Biscuits)

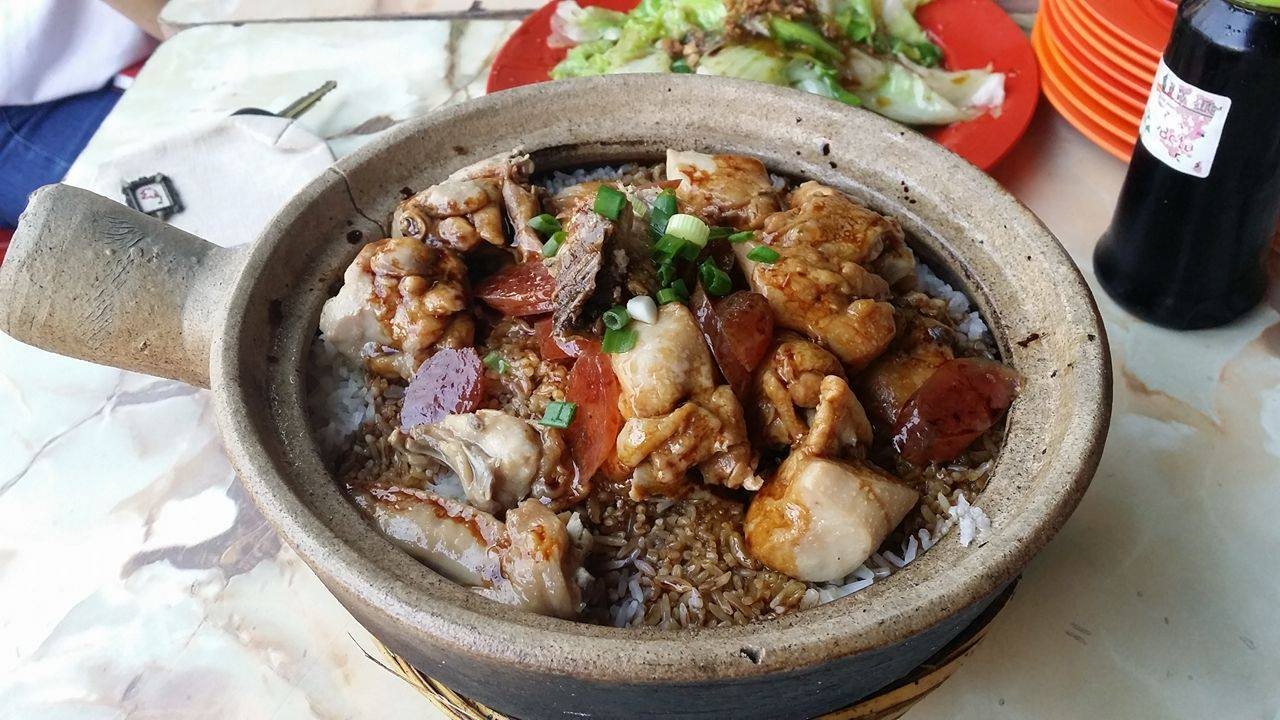
Fook Kee's Claypot Chicken Rice

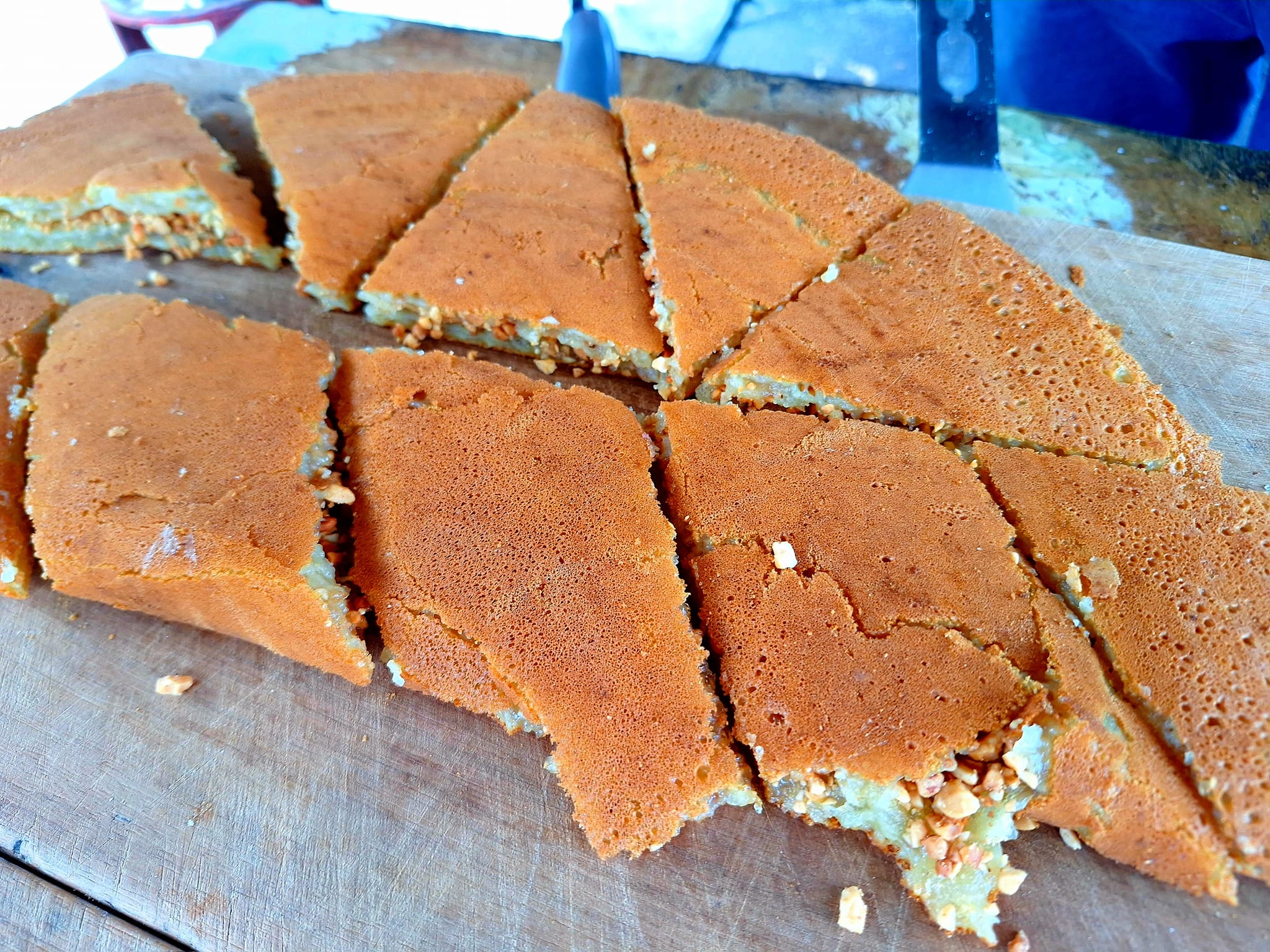
Apam Balik

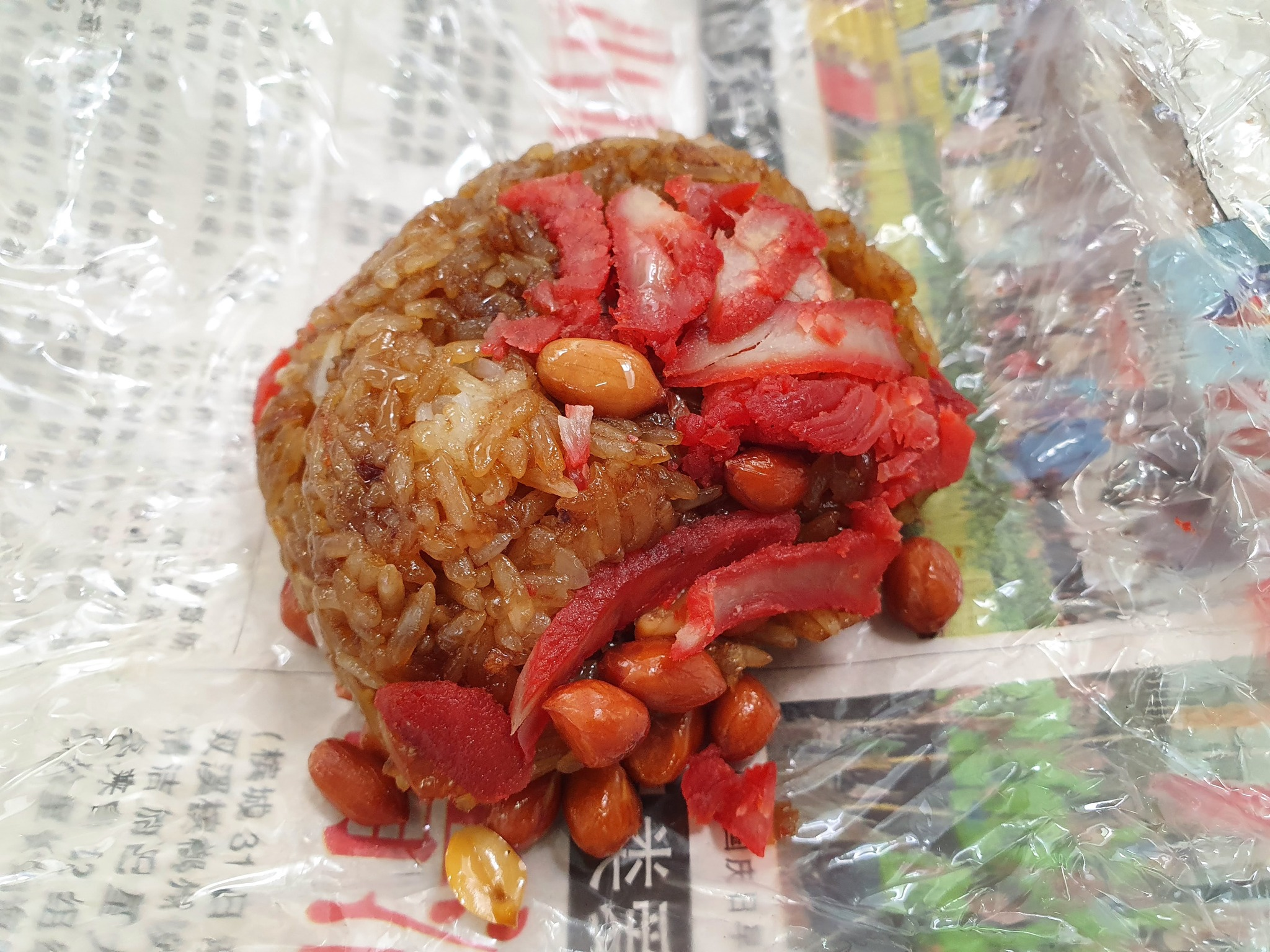
Lor Mai Fan (Glutinous Rice)
