= Daniel Wa Wai How =

Malaysian politician

- 胡伟豪

Personal details
- Born: 25 July 1988 (age 38) Bentong, Pahang, Malaysia
- Citizenship: Malaysian
- Party: Malaysian Chinese Association (MCA)
- Other political affiliations: Barisan Nasional (BN)
- Education: National University of Malaysia
- Daniel Wa Wai How on Facebook

Daniel Wa Wai How

Chinese name
- Traditional Chinese: 胡偉豪
- Simplified Chinese: 胡伟豪
- Hanyu Pinyin: Hú Wěiháo
- Wade–Giles: Hu2 Wei3 Hao2
- Jyutping: Wu4 Wai5 Hou4
- Hokkien POJ: Ô͘ Úi-hô
- Tâi-lô: Ôo Uí-hô

Daniel Wa Wai How (simplified Chinese: 胡伟豪; traditional Chinese: 胡偉豪; pinyin: Hú Wěiháo; Wade–Giles: Hu^{2} Wei^{3} Hao^{2}; Jyutping: Wu4 Wai5 Hou4; Pe̍h-ōe-jī: Ô͘ Úi-hô; born 25 July 1988) is a Malaysian politician. He is a member of Malaysian Chinese Association (MCA), a major component party of the Barisan Nasional (BN) coalition.

Wa originally from Bentong, Pahang after having graduated in Economy Studies at the National University of Malaysia (UKM), was the personal assistant to Lee Chee Leong, the former Member of Parliament (MP) for Kampar, Perak. He was the youngest BN candidate when he first contested in the 2013 General Election at the age of 25. He had contested the state seat of Keranji in Perak then, but lost the poll to Democratic Action Party (DAP) of Pakatan Rakyat (PR) candidate, Chen Fook Chye.

In the 2018 General Election he contested and lost again in the Keranji state seat to the DAP of Pakatan Harapan (PH) candidate. He was then elected in the 2018 MCA leadership election as one of the party Central Working Committee (CWC) members.

== Election results ==
Perak State Legislative Assembly
Year	Constituency	Candidate	Votes	Pct	Opponent(s)	Votes	Pct	Ballots cast	Majority	Turnout
2013	N41 Keranji	Daniel Wa Wai How (MCA)	5,110	31.96%	Chen Fook Chye (DAP)	10,671	66.75%	15,986	5,561	75.90%
2018	N42 Keranji	Daniel Wa Wai How (MCA)	4,031	18.70%	Chong Zhemin (DAP)	12,072	55.90%	16,363	8,041	75.70%
