= Kampar (federal constituency) =

Federal constituency in Perak, Malaysia

Kampar (P070)
Perak constituency

Federal constituency
- Legislature: Dewan Rakyat
- MP: Chong Zhemin; PH
- Constituency created: 1958
- Constituency abolished: 1974
- Constituency re-created: 1984
- First contested: 1959
- Last contested: 2022

Demographics
- Population (2020): 104,552
- Electors (2022): 89,894
- Area (km²): 547
- Pop. density (per km²): 191.1

Kampar is a federal constituency in Kampar District and Kinta District, Perak, Malaysia, that has been represented in the Dewan Rakyat from 1959 to 1974, from 1986 to present.

The federal constituency was created in the 1958 redistribution and is mandated to return a single member to the Dewan Rakyat under the first past the post voting system.

== Demographics ==
Ethnic breakdown of Kampar's electorate as of 2022
1. Chinese (52.7%)
2. Malay (35.4%)
3. Indian (10.4%)
4. Other ethnicities (1.60%)

As of 2020, Kampar has a population of 104,552 people.

Age breakdown of Kampar's electorate as of 2022
1. 18–20 (4.48%)
2. 21–29 (16.5%)
3. 30–39 (18.6%)
4. 40–49 (17.6%)
5. 50–59 (16.7%)
6. 60–69 (14.2%)
7. 70–79 (8.07%)
8. 80–89 (3.30%)
9. above 90 (0.73%)
Gender breakdown of Kampar's electorate as of 2022
1. Male (50.6%)
2. Female (49.4%)

== History ==
It was abolished in 1974 when it was redistributed. It was re-created in 1984.

=== Polling districts ===
According to the federal gazette issued on 31 October 2022, the Kampar constituency is divided into 51 polling districts.

State constituency	Polling Districts	Code	Location
Malim Nawar (N41)	Malim Nawar Utara	070/41/01	SMK Malim Nawar
Malim Nawar (N41)	Malim Nawar Tengah	070/41/02	SJK (C) Ying Sing
Malim Nawar (N41)	Malim Nawar Lama	070/41/03	SJK (C) Ying Sing
Malim Nawar (N41)	Malim Nawar Selatan	070/41/04	SJK (C) Ying Sing
Malim Nawar (N41)	Malim Nawar Baharu	070/41/05	SMK Malim Nawar
Malim Nawar (N41)	Malim Nawar	070/41/06	SK Methodist
Malim Nawar (N41)	Kampar Barat	070/41/07	Dewan Kelab Kilat TNB Kampar, Jalan Stesen
Malim Nawar (N41)	Mambang Diawan Utara	070/41/08	SJK (T) Mambang Diawan
Malim Nawar (N41)	Mambang Diawan Selatan	070/41/09	SJK (C) Yu Ying
Malim Nawar (N41)	Mambang Diawan Barat	070/41/10	SJK (C) Mambang Diawan
Malim Nawar (N41)	Kampong Ayer Hitam	070/41/11	SK Ayer Hitam Labu
Malim Nawar (N41)	Tronoh Mines	070/41/12	SJK (C) Sin Min
Malim Nawar (N41)	Kampong Ayer Papan	070/41/13	SMK Dato' Bendahara C.M. Yusuf
Malim Nawar (N41)	Pekan Tanjong Tualang	070/41/14	SJK (C) Thung Hon
Malim Nawar (N41)	Sungai Durian	070/41/15	SJK (C) Sungai Durian
Malim Nawar (N41)	Kampong Timah	070/41/16	SJK (C) Kampong Timah
Malim Nawar (N41)	Changkat Tin	070/41/17	SK Changkat Tin
Keranji (N42)	Kampar Utara	070/42/01	SK Sentosa
Keranji (N42)	Wah Loong Road	070/42/02	SK Kampar
Keranji (N42)	Kampong Aston	070/42/03	SM Methodist (ACS)
Keranji (N42)	Taman Bandar Baru	070/42/04	SA Rakyat As- Syuhada
Keranji (N42)	Jalan Kuala Dipang	070/42/05	SMK Kampar
Keranji (N42)	Jalan Gopeng	070/42/06	SJK (C) Kampar Girls
Keranji (N42)	Simpang Lima	070/42/07	SM Methodist (ACS)
Keranji (N42)	Kampong Changkat	070/42/08	SJK (C) Kampar Girls
Keranji (N42)	Jalan Keranji	070/42/09	SJK (C) Kampar Girls
Keranji (N42)	Jalan Baharu	070/42/10	SJK (C) Chung Huah
Keranji (N42)	Jalan Labu	070/42/11	SMK Seri Kampar
Keranji (N42)	Wah Loong Tengah	070/42/12	SMK Seri Kampar
Keranji (N42)	Wah Loong Selatan	070/42/13	SMK Seri Kampar
Keranji (N42)	Jalan Post Office	070/42/14	SJK (C) Kampar Girls
Keranji (N42)	Jalan Iskandar	070/42/15	SK De La Salle
Tualang Sekah (N43)	Ayer Denak	070/43/01	SK Ayer Denak
Tualang Sekah (N43)	Kampong Batu Tujoh	070/43/02	SK Tanjung Tualang
Tualang Sekah (N43)	Ladang Lembah Kinta	070/43/03	SJK (T) Ladang Kinta Valley
Tualang Sekah (N43)	Kampong Chenderong	070/43/04	SJK (C) Thung Hon
Tualang Sekah (N43)	Kampong Ayer Mati	070/43/05	SK Bakap
Tualang Sekah (N43)	Changkat Tualang	070/43/06	SK Changkat Tualang
Tualang Sekah (N43)	Ladang Kinta Kellas	070/43/07	Macer Hall
Tualang Sekah (N43)	Ladang Kota Bharu	070/43/08	SJK (T) Ladang Kota Bahroe
Tualang Sekah (N43)	Kota Bharu	070/43/09	SK Kota Baharu
Tualang Sekah (N43)	Changkat Bharu	070/43/10	SK Malim Nawar
Tualang Sekah (N43)	Tualang Sekah	070/43/11	SK Tualang Sekah
Tualang Sekah (N43)	Kuala Dipang	070/43/12	SK Kuala Dipang
Tualang Sekah (N43)	Jeram Selatan	070/43/13	SJK (C) Jeram
Tualang Sekah (N43)	Jeram Timor	070/43/14	SJK (C) Jeram
Tualang Sekah (N43)	Jeram Barat	070/43/15	SJK (C) Jeram
Tualang Sekah (N43)	Kampong Pisang	070/43/16	SJK (C) Jeram
Tualang Sekah (N43)	Gunong Mesah	070/43/17	SK Gunung Panjang; Dewan Komuniti, Kampung Tersusun Batu 3 ½.
Tualang Sekah (N43)	Sungai Siput Selatan	070/43/18	SJK (C) Sin Min
Tualang Sekah (N43)	Kampong Sahum	070/43/19	SK Sahom

=== Representation history ===
Members of Parliament for Kampar
Parliament	No	Years	Member	Party	Vote Share
Constituency created from Kinta South
Parliament of the Federation of Malaya
1st	P053	1959–1960	Leong Kee Nyean (梁圻源)	Alliance (MCA)	9,765; 48.57%
1st	P053	1960–1963	Chan Yoon Onn (陈源安)	PPP	11,314; 51.11%
Parliament of Malaysia
1st	P053	1963–1964	Chan Yoon Onn (陈源安)	PPP	11,314; 51.11%
2nd	P053	1964–1969	Toh Theam Hock (杜添福)	Alliance (MCA)	12,964; 48.51%
		1969–1971	Parliament was suspended		
3rd	P053	1971–1974	Fan Yew Teng (范俊登)	DAP	17,532; 59.95%
Constituency abolished, split into Batu Gajah, Kinta and Batang Padang
Constituency re-created from Batu Gajah and Parit
7th	P065	1986–1990	Ngoi Thiam Woh (魏添凤)	DAP	14,606; 52.60%
8th	P065	1990–1995	James Wong Wing On (黄永安)	GR (DAP)	13,964; 50.56%
9th	P068	1995–1999	Hew See Tong (丘思东)	BN (MCA)	26,653; 68.09%
10th	P068	1999–2004	Hew See Tong (丘思东)	BN (MCA)	23,030; 59.67%
11th	P070	2004–2008	Hew See Tong (丘思东)	BN (MCA)	23,129; 62.91%
12th	P070	2008–2013	Lee Chee Leong (李志亮)	BN (MCA)	20,126; 53.59%
13th	P070	2013–2015	Ko Chung Sen (许崇信)	PR (DAP)	26,863; 55.59%
13th	P070	2015–2018	Ko Chung Sen (许崇信)	PH (DAP)	26,863; 55.59%
14th	P070	2018–2022	Thomas Su Keong Siong (苏建祥)	PH (DAP)	30,216; 57.56%
15th	P070	2022–present	Chong Zhemin (张哲敏)	PH (DAP)	30,467; 51.30%

=== State constituency ===
Parliamentary constituency	State constituency						
Parliamentary constituency	1955–1959*	1959–1974	1974–1986	1986–1995	1995–2004	2004–2018	2018–present
Kampar		Gopeng					
Kampar						Keranji	
Kampar		Kuala Dipang			Kuala Dipang		
Kampar				Malim Nawar			
Kampar				Tanjong Tualang			
Kampar					Tualang Sekah		

=== Historical boundaries ===
State Constituency	Area				
State Constituency	1959	1984	1994	2003	2018
Gopeng	Gopeng; Kampung Chulek; Kopisan Baru; Kota Bharu; Malim Nawar				
Keranji				Batu Berangkai; Kampar; Keranji; Taman Kampar Siswa; Taman Perak Permai	
Kuala Dipang	Kampar; Kampung Batu Karang; Mambang Diawan; Sahom; Tronoh Mines		Batu Berangkai; Kampar; Keranji; Taman Kampar Siswa; Taman Perak Permai		
Malim Nawar		Batu Berangkai; Kampar; Keranji; Malim Nawar; Taman Perak Permai	FELCRA Sungai Durian; Kampung Timah; Mambang Diawan; Tanjong Tualang; Tronoh Mines		
Tanjong Tualang		Kampung Changkat Baru; Kampung Jeram; Kinta Valley; Kota Bharu; Lawan Kuda			
Tualang Sekah			Kampung Changkat Baru; Kampung Jeram; Kinta Valley; Kota Bharu; Lawan Kuda		Kampung Jeram; Kinta Valley; Kota Bharu; Sahom; Pos Dipang

=== Current state assembly members ===
No.	State Constituency	Member	Coalition (Party)
N41	Malim Nawar	Bavani Veraiah	PH (DAP)
N42	Keranji	Angeline Koo Haai Yen	PH (DAP)
N43	Tualang Sekah	Mohd Azlan Helmi	PH (PKR)

=== Local governments & postcodes ===
No.	State Constituency	Local Government	Postcode
N41	Malim Nawar	Batu Gajah District Council (Changkat Tin area); Kampar District Council	30200 Ipoh; 31000 Batu Gajah; 31600, 31610 Gopeng; 31700 Malim Nawar; 31750 Tronoh; 31800 Tanjong Tualang; 31850 Jeram; 31900 Kampar; 31920, 31950 Mambang Di Awan
N42	Keranji	Kampar District Council	30200 Ipoh; 31000 Batu Gajah; 31600, 31610 Gopeng; 31700 Malim Nawar; 31750 Tronoh; 31800 Tanjong Tualang; 31850 Jeram; 31900 Kampar; 31920, 31950 Mambang Di Awan
N43	Tualang Sekah	Batu Gajah District Council (Tanjung Tualang area); Kampar District Council	30200 Ipoh; 31000 Batu Gajah; 31600, 31610 Gopeng; 31700 Malim Nawar; 31750 Tronoh; 31800 Tanjong Tualang; 31850 Jeram; 31900 Kampar; 31920, 31950 Mambang Di Awan

== Election results ==
Malaysian general election, 2022
Party	Candidate	Votes	%	∆%
PH	Chong Zhemin	30,467	51.30	▲51.30
BN	Lee Chee Leong	16,137	27.17	▼7.91
PN	Janice Wong Oi Foon	12,127	20.42	▲20.42
Heritage	Leong Cheok Lung	655	1.10	▲1.10
Total valid votes		59,386	100.00	
Total rejected ballots		852		
Unreturned ballots		161		
Turnout		60,399	67.19	▼9.96
Registered electors		89,894		
Majority		14,330	24.13	▲1.65
PH hold		Swing		
Source(s) https://lom.agc.gov.my/ilims/upload/portal/akta/outputp/1753277/PUB610%20PARLIMEN%20PERAK.pdf

Malaysian general election, 2018
Party	Candidate	Votes	%	∆%
PKR	Thomas Su Keong Siong	30,216	57.56	▲57.56
BN	Lee Chee Leong	18,415	35.08	▼9.33
PAS	Yougan Mahalingam	3,864	7.36	▲7.36
Total valid votes		52,495	100.00	
Total rejected ballots		858		
Unreturned ballots		214		
Turnout		53,567	77.15	▼0.29
Registered electors		69,436		
Majority		11,801	22.48	▲11.30
PKR hold		Swing		
Source(s) "His Majesty's Government Gazette - Notice of Contested Election, Parliament for the State of Perak [P.U. (B) 237/2018]" (PDF). Attorney General's Chambers of Malaysia. 3 May 2018. "Federal Government Gazette - Results of Contested Election and Statements of the Poll after the Official Addition of Votes, Parliamentary Constituencies for the State of Perak [P.U. (B) 311/2018]" (PDF). Attorney General's Chambers of Malaysia. 28 May 2018.

Malaysian general election, 2013
Party	Candidate	Votes	%	∆%
DAP	Ko Chung Sen	26,863	55.59	▲9.18
BN	Lee Chee Leong	21,463	44.41	▼9.18
Total valid votes		48,326	100.00	
Total rejected ballots		816		
Unreturned ballots		123		
Turnout		49,265	77.44	▲12.28
Registered electors		63,619		
Majority		5,400	11.18	▲4.00
DAP gain from BN		Swing		?
Source(s) "Federal Government Gazette - Notice of Contested Election, Parliament for the State of Perak [P.U. (B) 174/2013]" (PDF). Attorney General's Chambers of Malaysia. 26 April 2013. Archived from the original (PDF) on 2019-12-29. "Federal Government Gazette - Results of Contested Election and Statements of the Poll after the Official Addition of Votes, Parliamentary Constituencies for the State of Perak [P.U. (B) 215/2013]" (PDF). Attorney General's Chambers of Malaysia. 22 May 2013.

Malaysian general election, 2008
Party	Candidate	Votes	%	∆%
BN	Lee Chee Leong	20,126	53.59	▼9.32
DAP	Keong Meng Sing	17,429	46.41	▲9.32
Total valid votes		37,555	100.00	
Total rejected ballots		1,048		
Unreturned ballots		350		
Turnout		38,953	65.16	▲2.06
Registered electors		59,784		
Majority		2,697	7.18	▼18.64
BN hold		Swing		

Malaysian general election, 2004
Party	Candidate	Votes	%	∆%
BN	Hew See Tong	23,129	62.91	▲3.24
DAP	Liew Ah Kim	13,639	37.09	▼3.24
Total valid votes		36,768	100.00	
Total rejected ballots		1,542		
Unreturned ballots		103		
Turnout		38,413	63.10	▲1.76
Registered electors		60,876		
Majority		9,490	25.82	▲6.48
BN hold		Swing		

Malaysian general election, 1999
Party	Candidate	Votes	%	∆%
BN	Hew See Tong	23,030	59.67	▼8.42
DAP	Loh Peng Lam	15,567	40.33	▲8.42
Total valid votes		38,597	100.00	
Total rejected ballots		1,084		
Unreturned ballots		23		
Turnout		39,704	61.34	▼3.96
Registered electors		64,727		
Majority		7,463	19.34	▼16.84
BN hold		Swing		

Malaysian general election, 1995
Party	Candidate	Votes	%	∆%
BN	Hew See Tong	26,653	68.09	▲18.65
DAP	Chong Joon Kin	12,490	31.91	▼18.65
Total valid votes		39,143	100.00	
Total rejected ballots		1,509		
Unreturned ballots		63		
Turnout		40,715	65.30	▼2.65
Registered electors		62,350		
Majority		14,163	36.18	▲35.06
BN gain from DAP		Swing		?

Malaysian general election, 1990
Party	Candidate	Votes	%	∆%
DAP	James Wong Wing On	13,964	50.56	▼2.04
BN	Hew See Tong	13,652	49.44	▲7.93
Total valid votes		27,616	100.00	
Total rejected ballots		768		
Unreturned ballots				
Turnout		28,384	67.95	▼0.75
Registered electors		41,773		
Majority		312	1.12	▼9.97
DAP hold		Swing		

Malaysian general election, 1986
Party	Candidate	Votes	%	∆%
DAP	Ngoi Thiam Woh	14,606	52.60	▼7.35
BN	Chin Fook Yen	11,525	41.51	▲11.32
SDP	Fan Yew Teng	1,636	5.89	▲5.89
Total valid votes		27,767	100.00	
Total rejected ballots		657		
Unreturned ballots		0		
Turnout		28,424	68.70	▼7.08
Registered electors		41,374		
Majority		3,081	11.09	▼18.67
DAP hold		Swing		

Malaysian general election, 1969
Party	Candidate	Votes	%	∆%
DAP	Fan Yew Teng	17,532	59.95	▲59.95
Alliance	Liew Why Hone	8,827	30.19	▼18.32
PMIP	Abdul Kadir Sohor	2,884	9.86	▲9.86
Total valid votes		29,243	100.00	
Total rejected ballots		1,469		
Unreturned ballots		0		
Turnout		30,712	75.78	▼5.61
Registered electors		40,527		
Majority		8,705	29.76	▲16.26
DAP gain from Alliance		Swing		?

Malaysian general election, 1964
Party	Candidate	Votes	%	∆%
Alliance	Toh Theam Hock	12,964	48.51	▲4.43
PPP	Chan Yoon Onn	9,357	35.01	▼16.10
Socialist Front	Khor Kim Yong	4,403	16.48	▲16.48
Total valid votes		26,724	100.00	
Total rejected ballots		1,122		
Unreturned ballots		0		
Turnout		27,846	81.39	▲3.69
Registered electors		34,215		
Majority		3,607	13.50	▲4.47
Alliance gain from PPP		Swing		?

Malaysian general by-election, 18 May 1960 Upon the disqualification of incumbent, Leong Kee Nyean
Party	Candidate	Votes	%	∆%
PPP	Chan Yoon Onn	11,314	51.11	▲8.77
Alliance	Liew Whye Hone	9,315	42.08	▼6.49
PMIP	Abdul Wahab Mohamed Noor	1,509	6.82	▼2.27
Total valid votes		22,138	100.00	
Total rejected ballots		133		
Unreturned ballots		0		
Turnout		22,271	77.70	▲1.52
Registered electors		28,662		
Majority		1,999	9.03	▲2.80
PPP gain from Alliance		Swing		?

Malayan general election, 1959
Party	Candidate	Votes	∆%
Alliance	Leong Kee Nyean	9,765	48.57
PPP	Chan Yoon Onn	8,512	42.34
PMIP	Othman Mohd Akib	1,827	9.09
Total valid votes		20,104	100.00
Total rejected ballots		128	
Unreturned ballots		0	
Turnout		20,232	76.18
Registered electors		26,559	
Majority		1,253	6.23
This was a new constituency created.
