= Keshvinder Singh =

Malaysian politician

Member of the Perak State Legislative Assembly for Malim Nawar
- In office 8 March 2008 – 5 May 2013
- Preceded by: Lee Chee Leong
- Succeeded by: Leong Cheok Keng
- Majority: 1,362 (2008)

Personal details
- Born: Keshvinder Singh s/o Kashmir Singh; 1972 (age 53–54)
- Citizenship: Malaysian
- Party: Democratic Action Party (DAP) (–2010)
- Other political affiliations: Pakatan Rakyat (PR) (–2010)
- Occupation: Politician

Keshvinder Singh s/o Kashmir Singh is a Malaysian politician who served as Member of the Perak State Legislative Assembly (MLA) for Malim Nawar from March 2008 to May 2013. He was a member of the Democratic Action Party (DAP), then a component party of the Pakatan Rakyat (PR) and presently Pakatan Harapan (PH) opposition coalitions.

== Politics ==
=== Offer to leave Pakatan Rakyat ===
On 25 February 2010, he had lodged a report to the Malaysian Anti-Corruption Commission that he had received an offer of 20 million Ringgit Malaysia to leave Pakatan Rakyat.

=== Quitting DAP ===
He was frustrated at the Pakatan Rakyat leadership in Perak as they were too political and quitted DAP.

== Election result ==
Perak State Legislative Assembly
Year	Constituency	Candidate	Votes	Pct	Opponent(s)	Votes	Pct	Ballots cast	Majority	Turnout
2008	N40 Malim Nawar	Keshvinder Singh Kashmir Singh (DAP)	7,801	53.26%	Chai Song Poh (MCA)	6,439	43.96%	14,647	1,362	62.93%
