= Leong Cheok Keng =

Malaysian politician

- 梁卓经

Member of the Perak State Legislative Assembly for Malim Nawar
- In office 5 May 2013 – 19 November 2022
- Preceded by: Keshvinder Singh Kashmir Singh (PR–DAP)
- Succeeded by: Bavani Veraiah (PH–DAP)
- Majority: 4,343 (2013); 6,082 (2018)

Personal details
- Born: Leong Cheok Keng
- Citizenship: Malaysian
- Party: Democratic Action Party (DAP) (–2021); Parti Bangsa Malaysia (PBM) (2021–2022); Heritage Party (WARISAN) (since 2022)
- Other political affiliations: Pakatan Rakyat (PR) (–2015); Pakatan Harapan (PH) (2015–2021)
- Relations: Leong Cheok Lung (younger brother)
- Occupation: Politician

Leong Cheok Keng

Chinese name
- Traditional Chinese: 梁卓經
- Simplified Chinese: 梁卓经
- Hanyu Pinyin: Liáng Zhuōjīng
- Jyutping: Loeng4 Coek3 Ging1
- Hokkien POJ: Niô͘ Tok-keng
- Tâi-lô: Niôo Tok-king

Leong Cheok Keng (simplified Chinese: 梁卓经; traditional Chinese: 梁卓經; pinyin: Liáng Zhuōjīng; Jyutping: Loeng4 Coek3 Ging1; Pe̍h-ōe-jī: Niô͘ Tok-keng; Tâi-lô: Niôo Tok-king) is a Malaysian politician who served as Member of the Perak State Legislative Assembly (MLA) for Malim Nawar from May 2013 to November 2022. He is a member of the Heritage Party (WARISAN). He was a member of Parti Bangsa Malaysia (PBM) as well as the Democratic Action Party (DAP), a component party of the Pakatan Harapan (PH) and formerly Pakatan Rakyat (PR) coalitions. He is also the older brother of Leong Cheok Lung, a candidate for the Member of Parliament (MP) for Kampar in the 2022 general election.

== Politics ==
Leong was expelled from DAP on 19 January 2021 for applying to join the Malaysian Chinese Association (MCA), a component party of the Barisan Nasional (BN) coalition. However, he remained as an independent and did not join any party. On 14 January 2022, he announced that he had joined PBM. On 3 November 2022, he announced that he had left PBM and would participate in the 2022 Perak state election under WARISAN. In the election, Leong lost his state seat to Bavani Veraiah of PH, garnering only 684 votes and losing his deposit.

== Personal life ==
His younger brother, Leong Cheok Lung is also a politician and has participated in the 2022 Malaysian general election, contesting in the Kampar federal seat under WARISAN.

== Election result ==
Perak State Legislative Assembly
Year	Constituency	Candidate	Votes	Pct	Opponent(s)	Votes	Pct	Ballots cast	Majority	Turnout
2013	N40 Malim Nawar	Leong Cheok Keng (DAP)	11,296	60.75%	Chang Gwo Chyang (MCA)	6,953	37.40%	18,593	4,343	75.50%
2018	N41 Malim Nawar	Leong Cheok Keng (DAP)	11,271	64.74%	Chang Gwo Chyang (MCA)	5,189	29.81%	17,409	6,082	75.96%
2018	N41 Malim Nawar	Leong Cheok Keng (DAP)	11,271	64.74%	Bawani Kaniapan (PSM)	213	1.22%	17,409	6,082	75.96%
2022	N41 Malim Nawar	Leong Cheok Keng (WARISAN)	684	3.67%	Bavani Veraiah (DAP)	10,905	58.57%	18,618	7,259	62.68%
2022	N41 Malim Nawar	Leong Cheok Keng (WARISAN)	684	3.67%	Chin Woon Kheong (MCA)	3,646	19.58%	18,618	7,259	62.68%
2022	N41 Malim Nawar	Leong Cheok Keng (WARISAN)	684	3.67%	Sherry Syed (BERSATU)	3,383	18.17%	18,618	7,259	62.68%
