= Siege of Campar =

Siege of Campar (1543)
- Part of Malay-Portuguese conflicts
Date	1543
Location	Campar, Malaysia
Result	Portuguese victory

Belligerents
Kingdom of Portugal; Kingdom of Campar	Sultanate of Bintang; Sultanate of Lingga

Commanders and leaders
Jorge Botelho; Abdela of Campar (executed)	Mahmud; King of Bintang; King of Lingga

Strength
8 Portuguese vessels Few native praus	2,500 men 70 ships

Casualties and losses
Unknown	King of Lingga's galley captured

The siege of Campar was a 1543 military conflict between the Kingdom of Portugal and the combined forces of Mahmud and the sultanates of Bintang and Lingga.

== Background ==
Mahmud, the father-in-law of the King of Campar, sought to reclaim his lost sovereignty, so he allied with other regional powers, the Kingdom of Bintang and the Kingdom of Lingga. Mahmud organized a formidable fleet, planning a siege on Campar, which was under the protection of the Portuguese. Abdela, the King of Campar, found himself in a dangerous position. Unable to endure the tyranny of Mahmud, he sought refuge with the Portuguese in Malacca. The situation escalated as the combined forces of Mahmud, Bintang, and Lingga prepared for an assault on Campar.

== Siege ==
In 1543, Mahmud, along with the King of Bintang and the King of Lingga, assembled a fleet of 70 ships and 2,500 men. The Portuguese, led by Jorge Botelho, prepared to defend the town. Botelho commanded the small force of eight ships and some of the native praus.

They made a surprise attack, as the King of Lingga personally led the charge. The Portuguese defenders met the assault, leveraging their knowledge of the terrain and superior naval tactics. In a clash, Botelho and his men succeeded in repelling the attack, damaging the enemy fleet. The King of Lingga's galley was captured, forcing him to leap overboard to escape the onslaught. Despite being outnumbered, the Portuguese successfully defended Campar.

== Aftermath ==
With the siege lifted, Botelho escorted Abdela back to Malacca, where he governed with such wisdom and propriety that the city flourished, attracting many who had fled the oppressive rule of Mahmud. However, Mahmud, seeking to undermine this prosperity, spread rumors that Abdela had allied with the Portuguese with his knowledge with the plan to seize Malacca and restore it to him, leading to distrust among the inhabitants. This falsehood reached Jorge de Albuquerque, the commandant, who acted on the misinformation. Abdela was tried, falsely condemned as a traitor, and executed publicly.
