= Angeline Koo Haai Yen =

Malaysian politician and company director

Yang Berhormat Puan Angeline Koo Haai Yen MLA
- 古海燕

Member of the Perak State Legislative Assembly for Keranji
- Incumbent
- Assumed office 19 November 2022
- Preceded by: Chong Zhemin (PH–DAP)
- Majority: 8,749 (2022)

Personal details
- Born: Angeline Koo Haai Yen; 26 June 1974 (age 52) Kampar, Perak, Malaysia
- Party: Democratic Action Party (DAP)
- Other political affiliations: Pakatan Harapan (PH)
- Children: 2
- Education: Shen Jai School of Commerce Ipoh (London Chamber of Commerce and Industry (LCCI))
- Occupation: Politician; Company Director

Angeline Koo Haai Yen

Chinese name
- Traditional Chinese: 古海燕
- Simplified Chinese: 古海燕
Transcriptions
Standard Mandarin
- Hanyu Pinyin: Gǔ Hǎiyàn

Angeline Koo Haai Yen (Chinese: 古海燕; pinyin: Gǔ Hǎiyàn; born 26 June 1974) is a Malaysian politician and company director who has served as Member of the Perak State Legislative Assembly (MLA) for Keranji since November 2022. She is a member of the Democratic Action Party (DAP), a component party of the Pakatan Harapan (PH) coalition. She is the first female Keranji MLA. She was Member of the Kampar District Council (MDKpr), Special Assistant to Keranji MLA Chong Zhemin and a director of a listed company.

== Member of the Perak State Legislative Assembly (since 2022) ==
In the 2022 Perak state election, Koo made her electoral debut after being nominated by PH to contest the Keranji state seat. Koo won the seat and was elected to the Perak State Legislative Assembly as the Keranji MLA after defeating Ng Wah Leng of Barisan Nasional (BN), Foong Kar Sing of Perikatan Nasional (PN) and Puah Chee Haur of the Heritage Party (WARISAN) by a majority of 8,749 votes.

== Election results ==
Perak State Legislative Assembly
Year	Constituency	Candidate	Votes	Pct	Opponent(s)	Votes	Pct	Ballots cast	Majority	Turnout
2022	N42 Keranji	Angeline Koo Haai Yen (DAP)	12,201	69.46%	Ng Wah Leng (MCA)	3,452	19.65%	17,566	8,749	62.18%
2022	N42 Keranji	Angeline Koo Haai Yen (DAP)	12,201	69.46%	Foong Kar Sing (Gerakan)	1,803	10.26%	17,566	8,749	62.18%
2022	N42 Keranji	Angeline Koo Haai Yen (DAP)	12,201	69.46%	Puah Chee Haur (WARISAN)	110	0.63%	17,566	8,749	62.18%
