= Kampar River, Malaysia =

Kampar River in Perak, Kampar

Kampar River
- River

Other transcription(s)
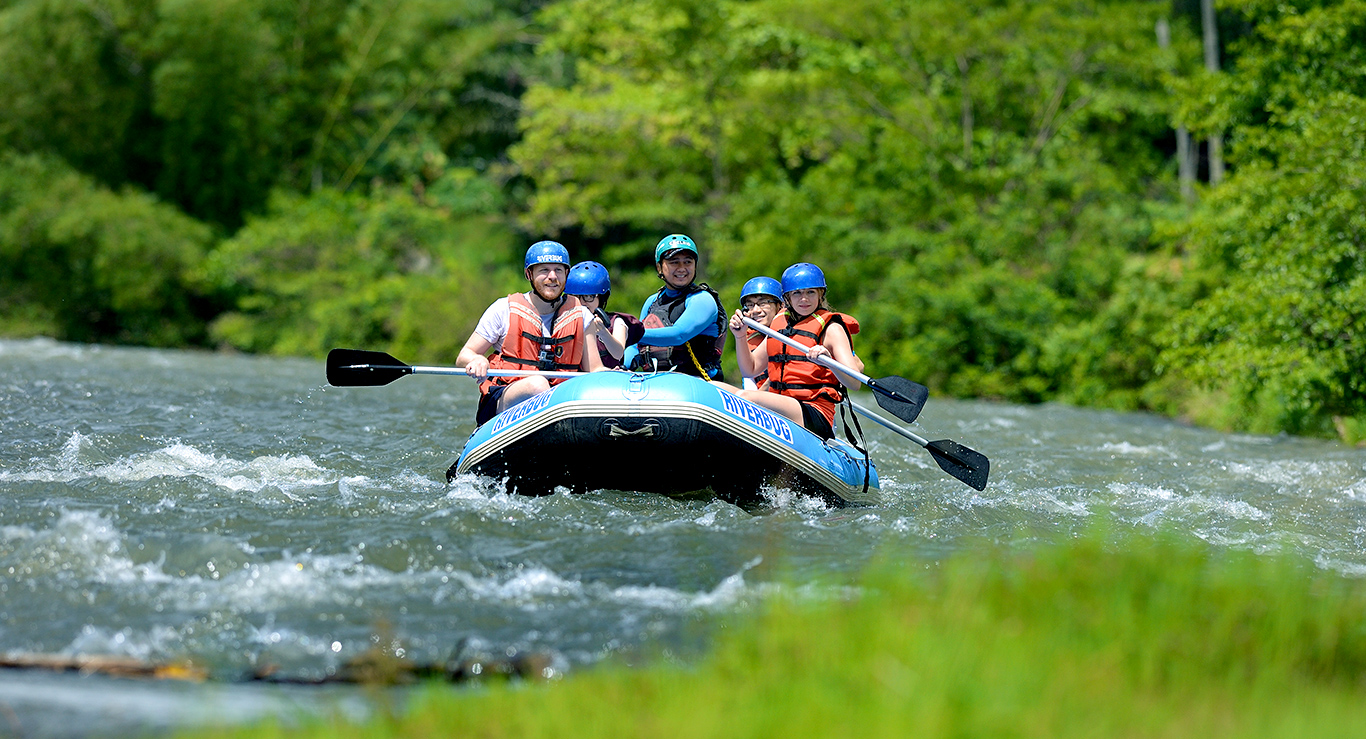
- People on a raft paddling trough the river

- Location within Perak
- State: Perak
- Town: Kampar, Perak
- District: Kampar District
- Time zone: UTC+8 (MST)
  - Summer (DST): Not observed
- Postal code: 31700

Kampar River is a river located in Kampar, Perak in Malaysia. The river is 414 km (257 mi) long. The Kampar River is also a popular destination site for rafting in Perak.

The river is located about 2 km (1.2 mi) from Kuala Lumpur and is a spot for water rafting.

== History ==
A weakened foundation on 26 October 2009 in the Kampar River caused the collapse of a bridge. One person died and two are missing. The part of the river where the collapse occurred was 4.5 ft.(1.5 metres) deep and 90 ft.(30 meters) wide.
