= Sekolah Menengah Kebangsaan Sentosa =

- Taman Bandar Baru; Kampar, Perak, 31900; Malaysia

Information
- School type: Government school, Secondary
- Motto: Matlamat dan Martabat
- School code: AEA9002
- Principal: Hajah Latifah Bt Ramli
- Website: http://smksentosakampar.edu.my/

Sekolah Menengah Kebangsaan Sentosa (or SMK Sentosa) is a high school located in Taman Bandar Baru, Kampar, Perak, Malaysia. The school houses 576 students and 66 teachers.

== History ==
The school was built on what used to be a mining site.
