= Kampar District =

District in Perak, Malaysia

- District of Perak
- Daerah Kampar
- Seal
- Interactive map of Kampar District
- Location of Kampar District in Malaysia
- Coordinates: 4°19′N 101°09′E
- Country: Malaysia
- State: Perak
- Seat: Kampar
- Local area government(s): Kampar District Council

Government
  - District officer: n/a

Area
  - Total: 669.80 km^{2} (258.61 sq mi)

Population (2010)
  - Total: 97,167
  - Estimate (2015): 103,600
  - Density: 145.07/km^{2} (375.73/sq mi)
- Time zone: UTC+8 (MST)
  - Summer (DST): UTC+8 (Not observed)
- Postcode: 316xx-319xx
- Calling code: +6-05
- Vehicle registration plates: A

Kampar District Council Majlis Daerah Kampar مجليس دايره كمڤر
- Local Government Act 1976

Type
- Type: Municipal Council of Kampar District

History
- Founded: 1 September 1977
- Preceded by: Kinta South District Council

Leadership
- President: Ahmad Suqairy Alias

Motto
- Maju dan Membangun; Progress and Develop

Meeting place
- Kompleks Pentadbiran MD Kampar, Jalan Iskandar, 31900 Kampar, Perak.

Website
- www.mdkampar.gov.my

The Kampar District (Kinta South) is a district in Perak, Malaysia. It was a district on 21 May 2009 after the Sultan of Perak declared Kampar the state's 10th district, which is the smallest district in Perak. Its local government is Kampar District Council based in the town of Kampar.

Historically, Kampar District was once famous for its tin, being one of the major tin producers in the 18th century. In the 19th century, Kinta district was famous for its tin. It was the number one tin producing valley in the world.

== Administrative divisions ==
Map of Kampar District

Kampar District is divided into 2 mukims, which are:

- Kampar (including much of Kampar's urban area, Malim Nawar and Jeram)
- Teja (Gopeng town)

== Demographics ==
Historical population
| Year | Pop. | ±% |
|---|---|---|
| 2010 | 96,303 | — |
| 2020 | 98,732 | +2.5% |
Figures before 2009 is included under Kinta District. Source:

The following is based on Department of Statistics Malaysia 2010 census.

Ethnic groups in Kampar, 2010 census
| Ethnicity | Population | Percentage |
|---|---|---|
| Bumiputera | 35,033 | 36.1% |
| Chinese | 51,341 | 52.8% |
| Indian | 10,638 | 11.0% |
| Others | 115 | 0.1% |
| Total | 97,167 | 100% |

== Federal Parliament and State Assembly Seats ==
Kampar district is divided between two parliamentary seats with some areas of the district in Gopeng constituency and the rest of the district into Kampar constituency.

List of Kampar district representatives in the Federal Parliament (Dewan Rakyat)

| Parliament | Seat Name | Member of Parliament | Party |
|---|---|---|---|
| P70 | Kampar | Chong Zhemin | Pakatan Harapan (DAP) |
| P71 | Gopeng | Tan Kar Hing | Pakatan Harapan (PKR) |

List of Kampar district representatives in the State Legislative Assembly of Perak

| Parliament | State | Seat Name | State Assemblyman | Party |
|---|---|---|---|---|
| P70 | N41 | Malim Nawar | Bavani Veriah Shasha | Pakatan Harapan (DAP) |
| P70 | N42 | Keranji | Angeline Koo Hai Yen | Pakatan Harapan (DAP) |
| P70 | N43 | Tualang Sekah | Mohd Azlan Helmi | Pakatan Harapan (PKR) |
| P71 | N46 | Teja | Sandrea Ng Shy Ching | Pakatan Harapan (PKR) |

== See also ==
- Districts of Malaysia
