= 1960 Kampar by-election =

- 18 May 1960

P053 seat in the Dewan Rakyat
- Turnout: 22,271
	First party	Second party	Third party
	PPP	All	PMIP
Candidate	Chan Yoon Onn	Wong Kok Wek	Abdul Wahab Mohamed Noor
Party	PPP	MCA	PMIP
Alliance		Alliance
Popular vote	11,314	9,315	1,509
Percentage	51.11%	42.08%	6.82%
MP before election
Leong Kee Nyean
Alliance (MCA)
Elected MP
Chan Yoon Onn
PPP

The Kampar by-election is a parliamentary by-election that was held on 18 May 1960 in the state of Perak in the Federation of Malaya. The Kampar seat fell vacant following the disqualification of incumbent, Leong Kee Nyean of Alliance by the High Court for corrupt practice. He won the seat in 1959 Malayan general election with a majority of 1,235 votes.

Chan Yoon Onn of PPP wrest the seat, winning against Wong Kok Wek of Alliance and Abdul Wahab Mohamed Noor of PMIP with a majority of 1,999 votes. The constituency had 28,662 voters. This marks the first time ruling Alliance to ever lost a by-election.

== Nomination ==
Nomination day is set at 25 April 1960 while the polling day is set at 18 May 1960. Alliance nominated architech, Liew Whye Hone. PPP nominated businessman, Chan Yoon Onn while PMIP nominated Ustaz Abdul Wahab Mohamed Noor.

== Results ==
Malaysian general by-election, 18 May 1960: Kampar Upon the disqualification of incumbent, Leong Kee Nyean
Party	Candidate	Votes	%	∆%
PPP	Chan Yoon Onn	11,314	51.11	▲8.77
Alliance	Liew Whye Hone	9,315	42.08	▼6.49
PMIP	Abdul Wahab Mohamed Noor	1,509	6.82	▼2.27
Total valid votes		22,138	100.00	
Total rejected ballots		133		
Unreturned ballots		0		
Turnout		22,271	77.70	▲1.52
Registered electors		28,662		
Majority		1,999	9.03	▲2.80
PPP gain from Alliance		Swing		?
