= 2018 Malaysian Chinese Association leadership election =

← 2013	04 November 2018
- Turnout: 65%
Candidate	Wee Ka Siong	Gan Ping Sieu	Ngoo Teck Keong
Party	MCA	MCA	MCA
Electoral vote	447	182	0
Popular vote	14,241	6,802	124
Percentage	71%	29%	0%
President of MCA before election
Liow Tiong Lai
President of MCA
Wee Ka Siong

A leadership election was held by the Malaysian Chinese Association (MCA) on 4 November 2018.

Both Wee Ka Siong and his running mate Mah Hang Soon won the presidency and deputy presidency respectively.

== Central Committee election results ==
=== President ===
Candidate	Delegates' votes	Popular vote	Percentage
Wee Ka Siong	447	14,241	71%
Gan Ping Sieu	182	6,802	29%
Ngoo Teck Keong	124	124	0%

=== Deputy President ===
Candidate	Delegates' votes	Popular vote	Percentage
Mah Hang Soon	428	13,662	68%
Tee Siew Kiong	201	7,448	32%

=== Vice Presidents ===
Candidate	Delegates' votes (max. 4)	Popular Vote	Percentage
Lim Ban Hong	483	14,074	77%
Tan Teik Cheng	441	13,861	70%
Ti Lian Ker	419	13,356	67%
Yew Teong Look	331	10,890	53%
Lim Chin Fui	280	8,628	45%
Ooi Siew Kim	200	7,114	32%
Ei Kim Hock	191	6,817	30%
Lau Lee	156	5,712	25%
Tan Seong Lim	15	1,408	2%

=== Central Working Committee Members ===
Candidate	Delegates' votes (max. 25)	Popular Vote
Lee Hong Tee	491	14,296
Low Ah Keong	487	14,111
Koh Nai Kwong	463	14,010
Chew Kok Woh	461	12,918
Pamela Yong	459	13,172
Kang Meng Fuat	455	13,180
Toh Chin Yaw	451	13,153
Ong Chong Swen	448	13,231
Teh Chai Aan	443	12,955
Leaw Kok Chan	441	12,987
Daniel Wa Wai How	432	12,565
Ng Chok Sin	423	12,458
Koh Chin Han	421	12,006
Tan Tuan Peng	406	12,249
Chan Quin Er	397	11,612
Tan Ken Tan	391	10,669
Chua Thiong Gee	381	11,217
Wong Tat Chee	381	11,200
Lau Chin Kok	378	11,378
Chiew Kai Heng	374	10,794
Yap Siok Moy	373	11,285
Ooi Eyan Hian	370	11,173
Ng Fook Heng	365	10,269
Chin Hong Vui	361	10,663
Daniel Ling Sia Chin	315	9,569
Boey Chin Gan	309	8,968
Teh Yeow Meng	302	9,434
Ivone Low Yi Wen	271	8,970
Lee Ching Yong	268	8,380
Chew Yin Keen	268	7,910
Lee Pei Wah	251	8,215
Ang Sui Eng	237	7,759
Tan Chuan Hong	234	7,769
Yip Jiun Hann	227	7,295
Seet Tee Gee	214	6,784
Chew Hian Tat	204	6,421
Ng Yew Aik	202	6,506
Cheng Joo Chooi	193	6,361
Ng How Doo	191	5,909
Chua Sheng Kian	187	6,144
Chuah Chin Chuon	184	6,239
Ng Kai Cheong	184	6,222
Yee Shan Kon	181	6,236
Tan Chai Yee	180	5,937
Wong Kah Foo	176	6,087
Lim Kian On	173	6,152
Low Joo Hiap	166	5,583
Khor Tze Zer	141	5,141
Ng Phei Jin	134	5,324
Foo Ton Hin	112	4,443
Lim Ah Yew	64	2,691
Lim Poh Yiak	32	1,898
Hui Huat	15	1,148
Wong Chun Pen	8	1,369
