= Chen Fook Chye =

Malaysian politician

- 曾福仔

Member of Perak State Legislative Assembly for Keranji
- In office 21 March 2004 – 9 May 2018
- Preceded by: Position established
- Succeeded by: Chong Zhemin (PH–DAP)
- Majority: 47 (2004); 4,435 (2008); 5,561 (2013)

Personal details
- Party: Democratic Action Party (DAP)

Chen Fook Chye is a Malaysian politician from DAP. He was the Member of Perak State Legislative Assembly for Keranji from 2004 to 2018.

== Politics ==
On 23 March 2018, DAP Perak state Chairman, Nga Kor Ming announced that Chen had voluntarily decided not to seek re-election in the 2018 Malaysian general election.

== Election results ==
Perak State Legislative Assembly
Year	Constituency	Candidate	Votes	Pct	Opponent(s)	Votes	Pct	Ballot cast	Majority	Turnout
2004	N41 Keranji	Chen Fook Chye (DAP)	5,989	48.62%	Chong Fah @ Chong Kah (MCA)	5,942	48.23%	12,319	47	61.21%
2008	N41 Keranji	Chen Fook Chye (DAP)	8,459	66.41%	Chong Mun Wah (MCA)	4,024	31.59%	12,738	4,435	64.15%
2013	N41 Keranji	Chen Fook Chye (DAP)	10,671	66.64%	Daniel Wa Wai How (MCA)	5,110	31.91%	16,014	5,561	75.90%
