= Ko Chung Sen =

Malaysian surgeon and politician

- 许崇信

Member of the Perak State Legislative Assembly for Kepayang
- In office 9 May 2018 – 19 November 2022
- Preceded by: Nga Kor Ming (PR–DAP)
- Succeeded by: Nga Kor Ming (PH–DAP)
- Majority: 9,495 (2018)

Member of the Malaysian Parliament for Kampar
- In office 5 May 2013 – 9 May 2018
- Preceded by: Lee Chee Leong (BN–MCA)
- Succeeded by: Su Keong Siong (PH–DAP)
- Majority: 5,400 (2013)

Faction represented in Dewan Rakyat
- 2013–2018: Democratic Action Party

Faction represented in Perak State Legislative Assembly
- 2018–2022: Pakatan Harapan

Personal details
- Born: Ko Chung Sen; 19 June 1968 (age 58) Kuala Lumpur, Malaysia
- Citizenship: Malaysian
- Party: Democratic Action Party (DAP)
- Other political affiliations: Pakatan Rakyat (PR) (2008–2015); Pakatan Harapan (PH) (2015–2018)
- Education: Trinity College
- Occupation: Politician
- Profession: Surgeon

Chinese name
- Simplified Chinese: 许崇信
- Traditional Chinese: 許崇信
- Hanyu Pinyin: Xǔ Chóngxìn
- Hokkien POJ: Khó͘ Chôngsìn

Ko Chung Sen (Chinese: 許崇信; Pe̍h-ōe-jī: Khó͘ Chông-sìn; born 1968) is a Malaysian surgeon and politician of Chinese descent. He was the Perak State Legislative Assemblyman for Kepayang from 2018 to 2022. He is a member of the Democratic Action Party (DAP), a component in the Pakatan Harapan (PH) coalition. A surgeon by profession, he received BAO cum laude from Trinity College in Dublin. He became a fellow of the Royal College of Surgeons in Ireland in 1999.

Ko returned to Malaysia to work as a Consultant Cardiothoracic Surgeon in Penang General Hospital in 2001 and worked there until 2004. He then moved to Ipoh to work in KPJ Specialist Hospital and has been there since then.

He was elected to the parliament for Kampar constituency in the 2013 election. As candidate of the DAP, he defeated Malaysian Chinese Association (MCA) incumbent Lee Chee Leong. In the 2018 election, was picked as candidate for Perak state seat of Kepayang which he had won and got to be its state assemblyman.

== Election results ==
Parliament of Malaysia
Year	Constituency	Candidate	Votes	Pct	Opponent(s)	Votes	Pct	Ballots cast	Majority	Turnout
2013	P070 Kampar	Ko Chung Sen (DAP)	26,863	55.59%	Lee Chee Leong (MCA)	21,463	44.41%	49,265	5,400	77.44%

Perak State Legislative Assembly
Year	Constituency	Candidate	Votes	Pct	Opponent(s)	Votes	Pct	Ballots cast	Majority	Turnout
2018	N29 Kepayang	Ko Chung Sen (DAP)	12,417	80.95%	Chang Kok Aun (MCA)	2,922	19.05%	15,560	9,495	74.60%
