= SS Kampar =

A number of steamships were named Kampar, including:-

- SS Kampar (1905), a Straits Steamship Company cargo ship in service 1905-35, requisitioned by the Royal Navy as HMS Kampar
- SS Kampar (1944), a Straits Steamship Company Hansa A type cargo ship in service 1947-57
