= Bavani Veraiah =

Malaysian politician

Yang Berhormat Puan Bavani Veraiah MLA

Member of the Perak State Legislative Assembly for Malim Nawar
- Incumbent
- Assumed office 19 November 2022
- Preceded by: Leong Cheok Keng (PH–DAP)
- Majority: 7,259 (2022)

Personal details
- Born: Bavani d/o Veraiah; 31 December 1973 (age 52) Negeri Sembilan, Malaysia
- Citizenship: Malaysian
- Party: Democratic Action Party (DAP) (since 1993)
- Other political affiliations: Gagasan Rakyat (GR) (1993–1995); Barisan Alternatif (BA) (1999–2004); Pakatan Rakyat (PR) (2008–2015); Pakatan Harapan (PH) (since 2015)
- Occupation: Politician
- Nickname: Shasha

Bavani d/o Veraiah (born 31 December 1973), nicknamed Shasha, is a Malaysian politician who has served as Member of the Perak State Legislative Assembly (MLA) for Malim Nawar since November 2022. She is a member of the Democratic Action Party (DAP), a component party of the Pakatan Harapan (PH) and formerly Pakatan Rakyat (PR), Barisan Alternatif (BA) and Gagasan Rakyat (GR) coalitions. She is the Women Secretary of DAP of Perak. She was the Executive Secretary of PR and PH of Perak as well as a coordinator of the Bentong parliamentary constituency.

== Political career ==
=== Member of the Perak State Legislative Assembly (since 2022) ===
==== 2022 Perak state election ====
In the 2022 Perak state election, Bavani made her electoral debut after being nominated by PH to contest the Malim Nawar state seat. Bavani won the seat and was elected to the Perak State Legislative Assembly as the Malim Nawar MLA for the first term after defeating Chin Woon Kheong of Barisan Nasional (BN), Sharifah Aemeera Najwa Syed Mohamed of Perikatan Nasional (PN) and incumbent and defending Malim Nawar MLA Leong Cheok Keng of the Heritage Party (WARISAN) who was contesting the seat for the third time by a majority of 7,259 votes in a landslide victory.

== Election results ==
Perak State Legislative Assembly
| Year | Constituency | Candidate | Votes | Pct | Opponent(s) | Votes | Pct | Ballots cast | Majority | Turnout |
|---|---|---|---|---|---|---|---|---|---|---|
| 2022 | N41 Malim Nawar | Bavani Veraiah (DAP) | 10,905 | 58.57% | Chin Woon Kheong (MCA) | 3,646 | 19.58% | 18,618 | 7,259 | 62.68% |
| 2022 | N41 Malim Nawar | Bavani Veraiah (DAP) | 10,905 | 58.57% | Sharifah Aemeera Najwa Syed Mohamed (BERSATU) | 3,383 | 18.17% | 18,618 | 7,259 | 62.68% |
| 2022 | N41 Malim Nawar | Bavani Veraiah (DAP) | 10,905 | 58.57% | Leong Cheok Keng (WARISAN) | 684 | 3.67% | 18,618 | 7,259 | 62.68% |
