= Lee Chee Leong =

Malaysian politician (born 1957)

Yang Berbahagia Dato' Lee Chee Leong DPMP AMP
- 李志亮

Vice-President of Malaysian Chinese Association
- In office 21 December 2013 – 3 November 2018 Serving with Hou Kok Chung; Chua Tee Yong; Chew Mei Fun
- President: Liow Tiong Lai
- Deputy: Wee Ka Siong
- Preceded by: Ng Yen Yen
- Succeeded by: Lim Ban Hong

Treasurer-General of Malaysian Chinese Association
- Incumbent
- Assumed office 4 November 2018
- President: Wee Ka Siong
- Deputy: Lawrence Low Ah Keong
- Preceded by: Kuan Peng Soon

Ministerial roles
- 2009–2010: Deputy Minister of Foreign Affairs
- 2010–2013: Deputy Minister of Home Affairs
- 2014–2016: Deputy Minister of International Trade and Industry
- 2016–2018: Deputy Minister of Finance

Faction represented in Dewan Rakyat
- 2008–2013: Barisan Nasional

Faction represented in Dewan Negara
- 2014–2018: Barisan Nasional

Faction represented in Negeri Sembilan State Legislative Assembly
- 1990–2008: Barisan Nasional

Personal details
- Born: Lee Chee Leong; 22 October 1957 (age 69) Ipoh, Perak, Federation of Malaya (now Malaysia)
- Citizenship: Malaysian
- Party: Malaysian Chinese Association (MCA)
- Other political affiliations: Barisan Nasional (BN); Perikatan Nasional (PN)
- Spouse: Lee Sieng Shuen
- Children: 4
- Education: Bristol Polytechnic
- Occupation: Politician

Lee Chee Leong (Chinese: 李志亮; pinyin: Lǐ Zhìliàng; Pe̍h-ōe-jī: Lí Chì-liōng; born 22 October 1957) is a Malaysian politician from the Malaysian Chinese Association (MCA). He served as one-term Member of Parliament (MP) of Malaysia for Kampar constituency in Perak, Malaysia from March 2008 to May 2013. As MP, he was twice appointed a deputy minister, first at the Ministry of Foreign Affairs from April 2008 to June 2010 and later at the Ministry of Home Affairs from June 2010 to May 2013.

He is currently serving as the treasurer-general of MCA, having previously been in office as one of four MCA vice-presidents between 2013 and 2018. He is also chairperson of the Kedah MCA state liaison committee and MCA Kampar division.

== Early life and education ==
Lee was born in Ipoh, Perak and completed his GCE Advanced Level at England's Hitchin College in 1978. He graduated from Bristol Polytechnic (now the University of the West of England) with a Bachelor of Arts (BA) majoring in accounting and finance in 1981. He is married to Karen Lee Sieng Shuen and has four daughters.

== Political career ==
Lee was elected to the Perak State Legislative Assembly in 1990, holding the seat of Tanjung Tualang and was a Perak state executive council (EXCO) member. Lee was successful in his candidacy for the parliamentary seat of Kampar in the 12th Malaysian general election and was appointed Deputy Minister of Foreign Affairs under the cabinet of Prime Minister of Malaysia, Mohammad Najib Abdul Razak, in April 2009. He was then appointed as Deputy Minister of Home Affairs in a minor cabinet reshuffle in June 2010.

After failing to retain the Kampar parliamentary seat in the 13th Malaysian general election held in 2013, Lee was nominated as one of two senators from Perak in 2014. Soon thereafter, he was sworn in as Second Deputy Minister of International Trade and Industry on 27 June 2014.

In June 2016, prime minister Najib reshuffled his cabinet and Lee was made Deputy Minister of Finance II. He would serve in this capacity until May 2018 when the National Front (BN), together with its component parties including the MCA, was sensationally defeated in the 14th Malaysian general election. Lee failed to regain the Kampar parliamentary seat whilst suffering a decreased share of votes.

== Election results ==
Perak State Legislative Assembly
Year	Constituency	Candidate	Votes	Pct	Opponent(s)	Votes	Pct	Ballots cast	Majority	Turnout
1990	N34 Tanjung Tualang	Lee Chee Leong (MCA)	6,783	55.17%	Wong Yoon Choong (DAP)	4,837	39.34%	12,660	1,946	68.99%
1990	N34 Tanjung Tualang	Lee Chee Leong (MCA)	6,783	55.17%	Chang Him Hu (IND)	674	5.48%	12,660	1,946	68.99%
1995	N39 Malim Nawar	Lee Chee Leong (MCA)	11,444	72.22%	Yew Swee Fong (DAP)	4,401	27.78%	16,336	7,043	65.98%
1999	N39 Malim Nawar	Lee Chee Leong (MCA)	10,678	69.44%	Su Keong Siong (DAP)	4,699	30.56%	15,833	5,979	61.93%
2004	N40 Malim Nawar	Lee Chee Leong (MCA)	10,493	74.44%	Hong Chin Poe (DAP)	3,603	25.56%	14,554	6,890	60.99%

Parliament of Malaysia
Year	Constituency	Candidate	Votes	Pct	Opponent(s)	Votes	Pct	Ballots cast	Majority	Turnout
2008	P070 Kampar	Lee Chee Leong (MCA)	20,126	53.59%	Keong Meng Sing (DAP)	17,429	46.41%	38,953	2,697	65.16%
2013	P070 Kampar	Lee Chee Leong (MCA)	21,463	44.41%	Ko Chung Sen (DAP)	26,863	55.59%	49,265	5,400	77.44%
2018	P070 Kampar	Lee Chee Leong (MCA)	18,415	35.08%	Su Keong Siong (DAP)	30,216	57.56%	53,567	11,801	77.15%
2018	P070 Kampar	Lee Chee Leong (MCA)	18,415	35.08%	Yougan Mahalingam (PAS)	3,864	7.36%	53,567	11,801	77.15%
2022	P070 Kampar	Lee Chee Leong (MCA)	16,137	27.17%	Chong Zhemin (DAP)	30,467	51.30%	60,399	14,330	67.19%
2022	P070 Kampar	Lee Chee Leong (MCA)	16,137	27.17%	Janice Wong Oi Foon (Gerakan)	12,127	20.42%	60,399	14,330	67.19%
2022	P070 Kampar	Lee Chee Leong (MCA)	16,137	27.17%	Leong Cheok Lung (WARISAN)	655	1.10%	60,399	14,330	67.19%

== Honours ==
- Perak
  - Knight Commander of the Order of the Perak State Crown (DPMP) – Dato' (1998)
  - Member of the Order of the Perak State Crown (AMP) (1993)

== See also ==
- Kampar (federal constituency)
- Malim Nawar (state constituency)
