= Chong Zhemin =

Malaysian politician and accountant

Yang Berhormat Tuan Chong Zhemin MP
- 张哲敏

Member of the Malaysian Parliament for Kampar
- Incumbent
- Assumed office 19 November 2022
- Preceded by: Thomas Su Keong Siong (PH–DAP)
- Majority: 14,330 (2022)

Member of the Perak State Legislative Assembly for Keranji
- In office 9 May 2018 – 19 November 2022
- Preceded by: Chen Fook Chye (PR–DAP)
- Succeeded by: Angeline Koo Haai Yen (PH–DAP)
- Majority: 8,041 (2018)

Personal details
- Born: Chong Zhemin; 5 July 1985 (age 41) Perak, Malaysia
- Citizenship: Malaysian
- Party: Democratic Action Party (DAP)
- Other political affiliations: Pakatan Harapan (PH)
- Children: 2 daughters; 1 son
- Education: London School of Economics and Political Science (LSE) (Master of Science (MSc) in Accounting and Finance)
- Occupation: Politician
- Profession: Accountant

Chong Zhemin

Chinese name
- Traditional Chinese: 張哲敏
- Simplified Chinese: 张哲敏
Transcriptions
Standard Mandarin
- Hanyu Pinyin: Zhāng Zhémǐn
Yue: Cantonese
- Jyutping: Zoeng1 Zit3 Man5
Southern Min
- Hokkien POJ: Tiuⁿ Tiat-bín

Chong Zhemin (simplified Chinese: 张哲敏; traditional Chinese: 張哲敏; pinyin: Zhāng Zhémǐn; Jyutping: Zoeng1 Zit3 Man5; Pe̍h-ōe-jī: Tiuⁿ Tiat-bín; born 5 July 1985) is a Malaysian politician and accountant who has served as the Member of Parliament (MP) for Kampar since November 2022. He served as Member of the Perak State Legislative Assembly (MLA) for Keranji from May 2018 to November 2022. He is a member of the Democratic Action Party (DAP), a component party of the Pakatan Harapan (PH) coalition. He is the Chief of Economic Development Bureau of DAP of Perak and was the Political Secretary to National Vice Chairman, Parliamentary Leader and State Chairman of DAP of Perak Nga Kor Ming.

== Election results ==
Perak State Legislative Assembly
Year	Constituency	Candidate	Votes	Pct	Opponent(s)	Votes	Pct	Ballots cast	Majority	Turnout
2018	N42 Keranji	Chong Zhemin (DAP)	12,072	73.78%	Daniel Wa Wai How (MCA)	4,031	24.63%	16,363	8,041	75.74%

Parliament of Malaysia
Year	Constituency	Candidate	Votes	Pct	Opponent(s)	Votes	Pct	Ballots cast	Majority	Turnout
2022	P070 Kampar	Chong Zhemin (DAP)	30,467	51.30%	Lee Chee Leong (MCA)	16,137	27.17%	59,386	14,330	67.19%
2022	P070 Kampar	Chong Zhemin (DAP)	30,467	51.30%	Janice Wong Oi Foon (Gerakan)	12,127	20.42%	59,386	14,330	67.19%
2022	P070 Kampar	Chong Zhemin (DAP)	30,467	51.30%	Leong Cheok Lung (WARISAN)	665	1.10%	59,386	14,330	67.19%

== Honours ==
=== Honours of Malaysia ===
- Malaysia
  - Recipient of the 17th Yang di-Pertuan Agong Installation Medal
