= Keranji =

Political subdivision in Malaysia

Keranji (N42)
Perak constituency

State constituency
- Legislature: Perak State Legislative Assembly
MLA
Angeline Koo Haai Yen
PH
- Constituency created: 2004
- First contested: 2004
- Last contested: 2022

Demographics
- Electors (2022): 28,248

Keranji is a state constituency in Perak, Malaysia, that has been represented in the Perak State Legislative Assembly.

== Demographics ==
Ethnic breakdown of Keranji's electorate as of 2022
1. Chinese (70.6%)
2. Malay (15.2%)
3. Indian (11.7%)
4. Other ethnicities (2.54%)

== History ==
=== Polling districts ===
According to the federal gazette issued on 31 October 2022, the Keranji constituency is divided into 15 polling districts.

State constituency	Polling Districts	Code	Location
Keranji（N42）	Kampar Utara	070/42/01	SK Sentosa
Keranji（N42）	Wah Loong Road	070/42/02	SK Kampar
Keranji（N42）	Kampong Aston	070/42/03	SM Methodist (ACS)
Keranji（N42）	Taman Bandar Baru	070/42/04	SA Rakyat As- Syuhada
Keranji（N42）	Jalan Kuala Dipang	070/42/05	SMK Kampar
Keranji（N42）	Jalan Gopeng	070/42/06	SJK (C) Kampar Girls
Keranji（N42）	Simpang Lima	070/42/07	SM Methodist (ACS)
Keranji（N42）	Kampong Changkat	070/42/08	SJK (C) Kampar Girls
Keranji（N42）	Jalan Keranji	070/42/09	SJK (C) Kampar Girls
Keranji（N42）	Jalan Baharu	070/42/10	SJK (C) Chung Huah
Keranji（N42）	Jalan Labu	070/42/11	SMK Seri Kampar
Keranji（N42）	Wah Loong Tengah	070/42/12	SMK Seri Kampar
Keranji（N42）	Wah Loong Selatan	070/42/13	SMK Seri Kampar
Keranji（N42）	Jalan Post Office	070/42/14	SJK (C) Kampar Girls
Keranji（N42）	Jalan Iskandar	070/42/15	SK De La Salle

=== Representation history ===
Members of the Perak State Assembly for Keranji
Assembly	No	Years	Member	Party
Constituency created from Kuala Dipang, Chenderiang and Malim Nawar
11th	N41	2004 – 2008	Chen Fook Chye (曾福仔)	DAP
12th	N41	2008 – 2013	Chen Fook Chye (曾福仔)	PR (DAP)
13th	N41	2013 – 2018	Chen Fook Chye (曾福仔)	PR (DAP)
14th	N42	2018 – 2022	Chong Zhemin (张哲敏)	PH (DAP)
15th	N42	2022–present	Angeline Koo Haai Yen (古海燕)	PH (DAP)

== Election results ==
Perak state election, 2022: Keranji
Party	Candidate	Votes	%	∆%
PH	Angeline Koo Haai Yen	12,201	69.46	▲69.46
BN	Ng Wah Leng	3,452	19.65	▼5.38
PN	Foong Kar Sing	1,803	10.26	▲10.26
Heritage	Puah Chee Haur	110	0.63	▲0.63
Total valid votes		17,566	100.00	
Total rejected ballots		245		
Unreturned ballots		39		
Turnout		17,850	63.19	▼12.55
Registered electors		28,248		
Majority		8,749	49.81	▼0.13
PH hold		Swing		

Perak state election, 2018: Keranji
Party	Candidate	Votes	%	∆%
PKR	Chong Zhemin	12,072	74.97	▲74.97
BN	Daniel Wa Wai How	4,031	25.03	▼7.35
Total valid votes		16,103	98.41	
Total rejected ballots		214	1.31	
Unreturned ballots		46	0.28	
Turnout		16,363	75.74	▼0.16
Registered electors		21,605		
Majority		8,041	49.94	▲14.70
PKR hold		Swing		
Source(s) "RESULTS OF CONTESTED ELECTION AND STATEMENTS OF THE POLL AFTER THE OFFICIAL ADDITION OF VOTES".

Perak state election, 2013: Keranji
Party	Candidate	Votes	%	∆%
DAP	Chen Fook Chye	10,671	67.62	▼0.14
BN	Daniel Wa Wai How	5,110	32.38	▲0.14
Total valid votes		15,781	98.55	
Total rejected ballots		205	1.28	
Unreturned ballots		28	0.17	
Turnout		16,014	75.90	▲11.75
Registered electors		21,111		
Majority		5,561	35.24	▼0.28
DAP hold		Swing		
Source(s) "KEPUTUSAN PILIHAN RAYA UMUM DEWAN UNDANGAN NEGERI". Archived from the original on 2022-03-05.

Perak state election, 2008: Keranji
Party	Candidate	Votes	%	∆%
DAP	Chen Fook Chye	8,459	67.76	▲17.56
BN	Chong Mun Wah	4,024	32.24	▼17.56
Total valid votes		12,483	98.00	
Total rejected ballots		212	1.66	
Unreturned ballots		43	0.34	
Turnout		12,738	64.15	▲2.94
Registered electors		19,857		
Majority		4,435	35.52	▲35.12
DAP hold		Swing		
Source(s) "KEPUTUSAN PILIHAN RAYA UMUM DEWAN UNDANGAN NEGERI PERAK BAGI TAHUN 2008".

Perak state election, 2004: Keranji
Party	Candidate	Votes	%
DAP	Chen Fook Chye	5,989	50.20
BN	Chong Fah @ Chong Kah	5,942	49.80
Total valid votes		11,931	96.85
Total rejected ballots		350	2.84
Unreturned ballots		38	0.31
Turnout		12,319	61.21
Registered electors		20,127	
Majority		47	0.40
This was a new constituency created.
Source(s) "KEPUTUSAN PILIHAN RAYA UMUM DEWAN UNDANGAN NEGERI PERAK BAGI TAHUN 2004".
