= Malim Nawar (state constituency) =

Political subdivision in Malaysia

Malim Nawar (N41)
Perak constituency

State constituency
- Legislature: Perak State Legislative Assembly
MLA
Bavani Veraiah
PH
- Constituency created: 1984
- First contested: 1986
- Last contested: 2022

Demographics
- Electors (2022): 29,701

Malim Nawar is a state constituency in Perak, Malaysia, that has been represented in the Perak State Legislative Assembly.

It has been represented by Bavani Veraiah of Pakatan Harapan (PH) since 2022.

== Demographics ==
Ethnic breakdown of Malim Nawar's electorate as of 2022
1. Chinese (65.5%)
2. Malay (24.0%)
3. Indian (9.75%)
4. Other ethnicities (0.70%)

== History ==
=== Polling districts ===
According to the federal gazette issued on 31 October 2022, the Malim Nawar constituency is divided into 17 polling districts.

State constituency	Polling Districts	Code	Location
Malim Nawar(N41)	Malim Nawar Utara	070/41/01	SMK Malim Nawar
Malim Nawar(N41)	Malim Nawar Tengah	070/41/02	SJK (C) Ying Sing
Malim Nawar(N41)	Malim Nawar Lama	070/41/03	SJK (C) Ying Sing
Malim Nawar(N41)	Malim Nawar Selatan	070/41/04	SJK (C) Ying Sing
Malim Nawar(N41)	Malim Nawar Baharu	070/41/05	SMK Malim Nawar
Malim Nawar(N41)	Malim Nawar	070/41/06	SK Methodist
Malim Nawar(N41)	Kampar Barat	070/41/07	Dewan Kelab Kilat TNB Kampar, Jalan Stesen
Malim Nawar(N41)	Mambang Diawan Utara	070/41/08	SJK (T) Mambang Diawan
Malim Nawar(N41)	Mambang Diawan Selatan	070/41/09	SJK (C) Yu Ying
Malim Nawar(N41)	Mambang Diawan Barat	070/41/10	SJK (C) Mambang Diawan
Malim Nawar(N41)	Kampong Ayer Hitam	070/41/11	SK Ayer Hitam Labu
Malim Nawar(N41)	Tronoh Mines	070/41/12	SJK (C) Sin Min
Malim Nawar(N41)	Kampong Ayer Papan	070/41/13	SMK Dato' Bendahara C.M. Yusuf
Malim Nawar(N41)	Pekan Tanjong Tualang	070/41/14	SJK (C) Thung Hon
Malim Nawar(N41)	Sungai Durian	070/41/15	SJK (C) Sungai Durian
Malim Nawar(N41)	Kampong Timah	070/41/16	SJK (C) Kampong Timah
Malim Nawar(N41)	Changkat Tin	070/41/17	SK Changkat Tin

=== Representation history ===
Members of the Legislative Assembly for Malim Nawar
Assembly		Years	Name	Party
Constituency created from Kampar, Gopeng and Chenderiang
7th	N33	1986-1990	Choo Kiang Seong (朱镜湘)	DAP
8th	N33	1990-1995	Choo Kiang Seong (朱镜湘)	DAP
9th	N39	1995-1999	Lee Chee Leong (李志亮)	BN (MCA)
10th	N39	1999-2004	Lee Chee Leong (李志亮)	BN (MCA)
11th	N40	2004-2008	Lee Chee Leong (李志亮)	BN (MCA)
12th	N40	2008-2010	Keshvinder Singh Kashmir Singh	PR (DAP)
12th	N40	2010-2013	Keshvinder Singh Kashmir Singh	BN (myPPP)
13th	N40	2013-2018	Leong Cheok Keng (梁卓经)	PR (DAP)
14th	N41	2018-2021	Leong Cheok Keng (梁卓经)	PH (DAP)
14th	N41	2021-2022	Leong Cheok Keng (梁卓经)	Independent
14th	N41	2022	Leong Cheok Keng (梁卓经)	PBM
15th	N41	2022–present	Bavani Veraiah	PH (DAP)

== Election results ==
Perak state election, 2022
Party	Candidate	Votes	%	∆%
PH	Bavani Veraiah	10,905	58.57	▲58.57
BN	Chin Woon Kheong	3,646	19.58	▼11.54
PN	Sherry Syed	3,383	18.17	▲18.17
Heritage	Leong Cheok Keng	684	3.67	▲3.67
Total valid votes		18,618	100.00	
Total rejected ballots		208		
Unreturned ballots		59		
Turnout		18,885	63.58	▼12.38
Registered electors		29,701		
Majority		7,259	38.99	▲2.51
PH hold		Swing		

Perak state election, 2018
Party	Candidate	Votes	%	∆%
PKR	Leong Cheok Keng	11,271	67.60	▲67.60
BN	Chang Gwo Chyang	5,189	31.12	▼6.98
Parti Sosialis Malaysia	Bawani A/P Kaniapan	213	1.28	▲1.28
Total valid votes		16,673	95.77	
Total rejected ballots		258	1.48	
Unreturned ballots		81	0.46	
Turnout		17,409	75.96	▲0.43
Registered electors		22,918		
Majority		6,082	36.48	▲12.68
PKR hold		Swing		
Source(s) "RESULTS OF CONTESTED ELECTION AND STATEMENTS OF THE POLL AFTER THE OFFICIAL ADDITION OF VOTES".

Perak state election, 2013
Party	Candidate	Votes	%	∆%
DAP	Leong Cheok Keng	11,296	61.90	▲7.12
BN	Chang Gwo Chyang	6,953	38.10	▼7.12
Total valid votes		18,249	98.15	
Total rejected ballots		304	1.64	
Unreturned ballots		40	0.22	
Turnout		18,593	75.50	▲12.57
Registered electors		24,615		
Majority		4,343	23.80	▲14.24
DAP hold		Swing		
Source(s) "KEPUTUSAN PILIHAN RAYA UMUM DEWAN UNDANGAN NEGERI". Archived from the original on 2022-03-27.

Perak state election, 2008
Party	Candidate	Votes	%	∆%
DAP	Keshvinder Singh Kashmir Singh	7,801	54.78	▲29.22
BN	Chai Song Poh	6,439	45.22	▼29.22
Total valid votes		14,240	97.22	
Total rejected ballots		364	2.49	
Unreturned ballots		43	0.29	
Turnout		14,647	62.93	▲1.94
Registered electors		23,276		
Majority		1,362	9.56	▼39.32
DAP gain from BN		Swing		?
Source(s) "KEPUTUSAN PILIHAN RAYA UMUM DEWAN UNDANGAN NEGERI PERAK BAGI TAHUN 2008".

Perak state election, 2004
Party	Candidate	Votes	%	∆%
BN	Lee Chee Leong	10,493	74.44	▲5.00
DAP	Hong Chin Poh	3,603	25.56	▼5.00
Total valid votes		14,096	96.85	
Total rejected ballots		426	2.93	
Unreturned ballots		32	0.22	
Turnout		14,554	60.99	▲0.24
Registered electors		23,861		
Majority		6,890	48.88	▲10.00
BN hold		Swing		
Source(s) "KEPUTUSAN PILIHAN RAYA UMUM DEWAN UNDANGAN NEGERI PERAK BAGI TAHUN 2004".

Perak state election, 1999
Party	Candidate	Votes	%	∆%
BN	Lee Chee Leong	10,678	69.44	▼2.78
DAP	Su Keong Siong	4,699	30.56	▲2.78
Total valid votes		15,377	97.12	
Total rejected ballots		436	2.75	
Unreturned ballots		20	0.13	
Turnout		15,833	60.75	▼5.23
Registered electors		26,063		
Majority		5,979	38.88	▼5.56
BN hold		Swing		
Source(s) "KEPUTUSAN PILIHAN RAYA UMUM DEWAN UNDANGAN NEGERI PERAK BAGI TAHUN 1999".

Perak state election, 1995
Party	Candidate	Votes	%	∆%
BN	Lee Chee Leong	11,444	72.22	▲23.08
DAP	Yew Swee Fong	4,401	27.78	▼23.08
Total valid votes		15,845	96.99	
Total rejected ballots		471	2.88	
Unreturned ballots		20	0.12	
Turnout		16,336	65.98	▼1.17
Registered electors		24,758		
Majority		7,043	44.44	▲42.72
BN gain from DAP		Swing		?
Source(s) "KEPUTUSAN PILIHAN RAYA UMUM DEWAN UNDANGAN NEGERI PERAK BAGI TAHUN 1995".

Perak state election, 1990
Party	Candidate	Votes	%	∆%
DAP	Choo Kiang Seong	7,778	50.86	▼6.10
BN	Chong Fah	7,516	49.14	▲6.10
Total valid votes		15,294	97.23	
Total rejected ballots		435	2.77	
Unreturned ballots		0	0	
Turnout		15,729	67.15	▼0.50
Registered electors		23,422		
Majority		262	1.72	▼17.78
DAP hold		Swing		
Source(s) "KEPUTUSAN PILIHAN RAYA UMUM DEWAN UNDANGAN NEGERI PERAK BAGI TAHUN 1990".

Perak state election, 1986
Party	Candidate	Votes	%
DAP	Choo Kiang Seong	8,700	56.96
BN	Wong Kon Fah	5,722	37.46
SDP	Kong Weng Kok	851	5.57
Total valid votes		15,273	97.90
Total rejected ballots		328	2.10
Unreturned ballots		0	0
Turnout		15,601	67.65
Registered electors		23,060	
Majority		2,978	19.50
This was a new constituency created.
Source(s) "KEPUTUSAN PILIHAN RAYA UMUM DEWAN UNDANGAN NEGERI PERAK BAGI TAHUN 1986".
