= Ipoh Timor =

Federal constituency in Perak, Malaysia

Ipoh Timor (P064)
Perak constituency

Federal constituency
- Legislature: Dewan Rakyat
- MP: Howard Lee Chuan How; PH
- Constituency created: 1994
- First contested: 1995
- Last contested: 2022

Demographics
- Population (2020): 134,700
- Electors (2022): 118,178
- Area (km²): 43
- Pop. density (per km²): 3,132.6

Ipoh Timor is a federal constituency in Kinta District, Perak, Malaysia, that has been represented in the Dewan Rakyat since 1995.

The federal constituency was created in the 1994 redistribution and is mandated to return a single member to the Dewan Rakyat under the first-past-the-post voting system. This is one of two only constituencies named after the same city. The other one is Ipoh Barat.

== Demographics ==
Ethnic breakdown of Ipoh Timor's electorate as of 2022
1. Chinese (68.4%)
2. Malay (23.7%)
3. Indian (7.40%)
4. Other ethnicities (0.40%)

As of 2020, Ipoh Timor has a population of 134,700 people.

Age breakdown of Ipoh Timor's electorate as of 2022
1. 18–20 (3.74%)
2. 21–29 (14.2%)
3. 30–39 (17.9%)
4. 40–49 (17.2%)
5. 50–59 (15.6%)
6. 60–69 (15.3%)
7. 70–79 (10.3%)
8. 80–89 (4.44%)
9. above 90 (1.08%)
Gender breakdown of Ipoh Timor's electorate as of 2022
1. Male (49.1%)
2. Female (50.9%)

== History ==
=== Polling districts ===
According to the federal gazette issued on 31 October 2022, the Ipoh Timor constituency is divided into 35 polling districts.

State constituency	Polling districts	Code	Location
Canning (N25)	Taman Ipoh Timor	064/25/01	Kolej Vokasional Ipoh
Canning (N25)	Taman Ipoh Selatan	064/25/02	SK Marian Convent
Canning (N25)	Taman Wah Keong	064/25/03	SJK (C) Chung Tack
Canning (N25)	Simee Barat	064/25/04	SJK (C) Chung Tack
Canning (N25)	Simee Timor	064/25/05	SJK (T) Kg. Simee
Canning (N25)	Taman Ipoh	064/25/06	SK La Salle
Canning (N25)	Taman Ipoh Barat	064/25/07	SK La Salle
Canning (N25)	Canning Garden Barat	064/25/08	SK Marian Convent
Canning (N25)	Canning Garden Timor	064/25/09	SK Ho Seng Ong Methodist
Canning (N25)	Lumba Kuda	064/25/10	Sekolah Izzudin Shah
Canning (N25)	Taman Cempaka	064/25/11	SMK Raja Chulan
Canning (N25)	Desa Cempaka	064/25/12	SK Raja Chulan
Tebing Tinggi (N26)	Jalan Dato Maharaja Lela	064/26/01	SMK St. Michael
Tebing Tinggi (N26)	Jalan Sultan Yusof	064/26/02	SMK Methodist (ACS)
Tebing Tinggi (N26)	Jalan Tun Perak	064/26/03	SK Dato' Panglima Kinta
Tebing Tinggi (N26)	Sungai Kinta	064/26/04	SK Kuala Pari
Tebing Tinggi (N26)	Tebing Sungai Kinta	064/26/05	SJK (C) Chung San
Tebing Tinggi (N26)	Kampong Paloh	064/26/06	Tadika Chung Shan
Tebing Tinggi (N26)	Tebing Tinggi	064/26/07	SJK (C) Chung San
Tebing Tinggi (N26)	Kuala Pari Hilir	064/26/08	SK Kuala Pari
Tebing Tinggi (N26)	Kampong Seri Kinta	064/26/09	SRA Rakyat Al Rashidiah; SRA Rakyat At-Tolabiah
Tebing Tinggi (N26)	Pengkalan Barat	064/26/10	SMK Kg. Pasir Puteh; SRA Rakyat An Najmi
Tebing Tinggi (N26)	Pengkalan Gate	064/26/11	SMK Lahat
Tebing Tinggi (N26)	Pengkalan Pegoh	064/26/12	SK Pengkalan Pegoh; SRA Rakyat Al Rahmaniah Taman Desa Aman; SRA Rakyat Ikhwaniah
Pasir Pinji (N27)	Jalan Bendahara	064/27/01	SJK (C) Sam Chai
Pasir Pinji (N27)	Kampar Road	064/27/02	SMK (P) Methodist
Pasir Pinji (N27)	Housing Trust	064/27/03	SMK Raja Perempuan
Pasir Pinji (N27)	Pasir Pinji Utara	064/27/04	SJK (C) Pasir Pinji 1; SJK (C) Pasir Pinji 2
Pasir Pinji (N27)	Pasir Pinji Selatan	064/27/05	SMK Jalan Pasir Puteh
Pasir Pinji (N27)	Pinji Lane Utara	064/27/06	SJK (C) Sam Chai
Pasir Pinji (N27)	Pasir Puteh Utara	064/27/07	SK Raja Dihilir Ekram
Pasir Pinji (N27)	Pasir Puteh Baru	064/27/08	SMK Jalan Pasir Puteh
Pasir Pinji (N27)	Pinji Lane Selatan	064/27/09	SK Pinji
Pasir Pinji (N27)	Pasir Puteh Selatan	064/27/10	SK Kampong Pasir Puteh
Pasir Pinji (N27)	Taman Pengkalan Jaya	064/27/11	SK Jalan Pegoh

=== Representation history ===
Members of Parliament for Ipoh Timor
Parliament	No	Years	Member	Party	Vote Share
Constituency created from Ipoh, Tambun and Pasir Pinji
9th	P061	1995–1999	Chang Kon You (郑光祖)	BN (MCA)	24,129; 50.30%
10th	P061	1999–2004	Thong Fah Chong (汤华昌)	BN (MCA)	25,273; 51.74%
11th	P064	2004–2008	Lim Kit Siang (林吉祥)	DAP	28,851; 60.20%
12th	P064	2008–2013	Lim Kit Siang (林吉祥)	PR (DAP)	37,364; 70.78%
13th	P064	2013–2015	Thomas Su Keong Siong (苏建祥)	PR (DAP)	49,086; 76.49%
13th	P064	2015–2018	Thomas Su Keong Siong (苏建祥)	PH (DAP)	49,086; 76.49%
14th	P064	2018–2022	Wong Kah Woh (黄家和)	PH (DAP)	56,519; 80.46%
15th	P064	2022–present	Howard Lee Chuan How (李存孝)	PH (DAP)	57,549; 72.14%

=== State constituency ===
Parliamentary constituency	State constituency						
Parliamentary constituency	1955–1959*	1959–1974	1974–1986	1986–1995	1995–2004	2004–2018	2018–present
Ipoh Timor						Canning	
Ipoh Timor					Pasir Pinji		
Ipoh Timor					Taman Canning		
Ipoh Timor					Tebing Tinggi		

=== Historical boundaries ===
State Constituency	Area		
State Constituency	1994	2003	2018
Canning		Medan Ipoh; Simee; Taman Cempaka; Taman Ipoh Baru; Taman Tambun	Medan Ipoh; Simee; Taman Canning; Taman Cempaka; Taman Ipoh Baru
Pasir Pinji	Kampung Cempaka Sari; Pasir Puteh; Rapat Baru; Rapat Jaya; Taman Boon Bak	Kampung Cempaka Sari; Pasir Puteh; Taman Boon Bak; Taman Shatin; Taman Sinfar	Jalan Kampar; Pasir Puteh; Taman Boon Bak; Taman Shatin; Taman Sinfar
Taman Canning	Medan Ipoh; Pekan Razaki; Simee; Taman Ipoh Baru; Taman Tambun		
Tebing Tinggi	Jalan Kampar; Kampung Kuchai; Kampung Paloh; Kuala Pari; Tebing Tinggi		Kampung Cempaka Sari; Kampung Paloh; Kuala Pari; Pengkalan Gate; Pengkalan Pegoh

=== Current state assembly members ===
No.	State Constituency	Member	Coalition (Party)
N25	Canning	Jenny Choy Tsi Jen	PH (DAP)
N26	Tebing Tinggi	Abdul Aziz Bari	PH (DAP)
N27	Pasir Pinji	Goh See Hua	PH (DAP)

=== Local governments & postcodes ===
No.	State Constituency	Local Government	Postcode
N25	Canning	Ipoh City Council	30000, 30100, 30200, 30250, 30300, 30350, 30450, 30506, 31350, 31400, 31500, 31650 Ipoh
N26	Tebing Tinggi	Ipoh City Council	30000, 30100, 30200, 30250, 30300, 30350, 30450, 30506, 31350, 31400, 31500, 31650 Ipoh
N27	Pasir Pinji	Ipoh City Council	30000, 30100, 30200, 30250, 30300, 30350, 30450, 30506, 31350, 31400, 31500, 31650 Ipoh

== Election results ==
Malaysian general election, 2022: Ipoh Timor
Party	Candidate	Votes	%	∆%
PH	Howard Lee Chuan How	57,549	72.14	▲72.14
PN	Nor Afzainzam Salleh	13,661	17.12	▲17.12
BN	Ng Kai Cheong	8,570	10.74	▼8.80
Total valid votes		79,789	100.00	
Total rejected ballots		678		
Unreturned ballots		381		
Turnout		80,839	67.51	▼10.89
Registered electors		118,178		
Majority		43,888	55.02	▼5.91
PH hold		Swing		
Source(s) https://lom.agc.gov.my/ilims/upload/portal/akta/outputp/1753277/PUB610%20PARLIMEN%20PERAK.pdf

Malaysian general election, 2018: Ipoh Timor
Party	Candidate	Votes	%	∆%
PKR	Wong Kah Woh	56,519	80.46	▲80.46
BN	Kathleen Wong Mei Yin	13,722	19.54	▼3.97
Total valid votes		70,241	100.00	
Total rejected ballots		1,023		
Unreturned ballots		462		
Turnout		71,726	78.40	▼1.31
Registered electors		91,486		
Majority		42,797	60.93	▲9.95
PKR hold		Swing		
Source(s) "His Majesty's Government Gazette - Notice of Contested Election, Parliament for the State of Perak [P.U. (B) 237/2018]" (PDF). Attorney General's Chambers of Malaysia. 3 May 2018. "Federal Government Gazette - Results of Contested Election and Statements of the Poll after the Official Addition of Votes, Parliamentary Constituencies for the State of Perak [P.U. (B) 311/2018]" (PDF). Attorney General's Chambers of Malaysia. 28 May 2018.

Malaysian general election, 2013: Ipoh Timor
Party	Candidate	Votes	%	∆%
DAP	Thomas Su Keong Siong	49,086	76.49	▲5.71
BN	Kathleen Wong Mei Yin	15,086	23.51	▼5.71
Total valid votes		64,172	100.00	
Total rejected ballots		834		
Unreturned ballots		210		
Turnout		65,217	79.71	▲9.26
Registered electors		81,818		
Majority		34,000	50.98	▲9.42
DAP hold		Swing		
Source(s) "Federal Government Gazette - Notice of Contested Election, Parliament for the State of Perak [P.U. (B) 174/2013]" (PDF). Attorney General's Chambers of Malaysia. 26 April 2013. Archived from the original (PDF) on 2019-12-29. "Federal Government Gazette - Results of Contested Election and Statements of the Poll after the Official Addition of Votes, Parliamentary Constituencies for the State of Perak [P.U. (B) 215/2013]" (PDF). Attorney General's Chambers of Malaysia. 22 May 2013.

Malaysian general election, 2008: Ipoh Timor
Party	Candidate	Votes	%	∆%
DAP	Lim Kit Siang	37,364	70.78	▲10.58
BN	Liew Mun Hon	15,422	29.22	▼10.58
Total valid votes		52,786	100.00	
Total rejected ballots		707		
Unreturned ballots		501		
Turnout		53,994	70.45	▲3.39
Registered electors		76,647		
Majority		21,942	41.56	▲21.16
DAP hold		Swing		

Malaysian general election, 2004: Ipoh Timor
Party	Candidate	Votes	%	∆%
DAP	Lim Kit Siang	28,851	60.20	▲12.81
BN	Thong Fah Chong	19,077	39.80	▼11.94
Total valid votes		47,928	100.00	
Total rejected ballots		933		
Unreturned ballots		314		
Turnout		49,175	67.06	▼2.33
Registered electors		73,329		
Majority		9,774	20.40	▼16.05
DAP gain from BN		Swing		?

Malaysian general election, 1999: Ipoh Timor
Party	Candidate	Votes	%	∆%
BN	Thong Fah Chong	25,273	51.74	▲1.44
DAP	Ngeh Koo Ham	23,146	47.39	▼2.31
MDP	Mohd Yusoff Omar	427	0.87	▲0.87
Total valid votes		48,846	100.00	
Total rejected ballots		808		
Unreturned ballots		768		
Turnout		50,422	64.73	▲1.95
Registered electors		77,895		
Majority		2,127	4.35	▲3.75
BN hold		Swing		

Malaysian general election, 1995: Ipoh Timor
Party	Candidate	Votes	%
BN	Chang Kon You @ Chen Kwan Wu	24,129	50.30
DAP	Kerk Kim Hock	23,837	49.70
Total valid votes		47,966	100.00
Total rejected ballots		875	
Unreturned ballots		392	
Turnout		49,233	66.68
Registered electors		73,834	
Majority		292	0.60
This was a new constituency created.
