= Steven Chaw Kam Foon =

Malaysian politician and computer hardware engineer

Yang Berhormat Tuan Steven Chaw Kam Foon MLA
- 周锦欢

Political Secretary to the Minister of Housing and Local Government
- Incumbent
- Assumed office 17 February 2024
- Monarch: Ibrahim
- Prime Minister: Anwar Ibrahim
- Minister: Nga Kor Ming
- Preceded by: Chiong Yoke Kong

Political Secretary to the Minister of Human Resources
- In office 20 October 2023 – 12 December 2023
- Monarch: Abdullah
- Prime Minister: Anwar Ibrahim
- Minister: Sivakumar Varatharaju
- Succeeded by: Kelvin Yii Lee Wuen

State Assistant Organising Secretary of the Democratic Action Party of Perak
- Incumbent
- Assumed office 14 March 2021 Serving with Goh See Hua (since 2024)
- Secretary-General: Lim Guan Eng (2021–2022); Anthony Loke Siew Fook (since 2022)
- State Chairman: Nga Kor Ming
- State Organising Secretary: Teh Kok Lim
- Preceded by: Sivasubramaniam Athinarayanan

State Youth Chief of the Democratic Action Party of Perak
- In office 28 October 2018 – 10 April 2022
- Deputy: Dan Adriel Daniel Velloo (2018–2020)
- Secretary-General: Lim Guan Eng (2018–2022); Anthony Loke Siew Fook (20 March–10 April 2022)
- State Chairman: Nga Kor Ming
- Preceded by: Howard Lee Chuan How
- Succeeded by: Woo Kah Leong

Member of the Perak State Legislative Assembly for Menglembu
- Incumbent
- Assumed office 9 May 2018
- Preceded by: Lim Pek Har (PR–DAP)
- Majority: 17,948 (2018); 21,191 (2022)

Personal details
- Born: Steven Chaw Kam Foon; 19 December 1983 (age 42) Malaysia
- Citizenship: Malaysian
- Party: Democratic Action Party (DAP) (since 2008)
- Other political affiliations: Pakatan Rakyat (PR) (2008–2015); Pakatan Harapan (PH) (since 2015)
- Spouse: (李沁慧)
- Relations: Lim Pek Har (cousin) (周凤明) (younger sister)
- Children: (周巧恩) (daughter)
- Parent(s): (周志华) (father) (石银儿) (mother)
- Education: Informatics Academy, Singapore (Advanced Diploma in Computer Engineering)
- Occupation: Politician
- Profession: Computer hardware engineer

Steven Chaw Kam Foon

Chinese name
- Traditional Chinese: 周錦歡
- Simplified Chinese: 周锦欢
Transcriptions
Standard Mandarin
- Hanyu Pinyin: Zhōu Jǐnhuān
Yue: Cantonese
- Jyutping: Zau1 Gam2 Fun1
Southern Min
- Hokkien POJ: Chiu Kím-hoan

Chaw Kam Foon (simplified Chinese: 周锦欢; traditional Chinese: 周錦歡; pinyin: Zhōu Jǐnhuān; Jyutping: Zau1 Gam2 Fun1; Pe̍h-ōe-jī: Chiu Kím-hoan; born 19 December 1983) also known as Steven Chaw Kam Foon is a Malaysian politician and computer hardware engineer who has served as Political Secretary to the Minister of Housing and Local Government Nga Kor Ming since February 2024 and Member of the Perak State Legislative Assembly (MLA) for Menglembu since May 2018. He is a member of the Democratic Action Party (DAP), a component party of the Pakatan Harapan (PH) and formerly Pakatan Rakyat (PR) coalitions. He has served as the State Assistant Organising Secretary of DAP of Perak since March 2021. He served as the Political Secretary to the Minister of Human Resources Sivakumar Varatharaju from August to December 2023, Special Assistant as well as Political Secretary to the Menglembu MLA and his cousin Lim Pek Har from 2008 to his election as the Menglembu MLA in May 2018, State Youth Chief of DAP of Perak from October 2018 to April 2022, State Vice Youth Chief of DAP of Perak from 2015 to his promotion to the State Youth Chief in October 2018, State Deputy Youth Chief of PH of Perak from 2017, State Head of Public Complaints Bureau of DAP of Perak from 2016 and Branch Chairman of DAP of Menglembu North from 2011 to 2018.

== Election results ==
Perak State Legislative Assembly
Year	Constituency	Candidate	Votes	Pct	Opponent(s)	Votes	Pct	Ballots cast	Majority	Turnout
2018	N32 Menglembu	Chaw Kam Foon (DAP)	20,456	86.76%	Wong Kam Seng (MCA)	2,508	10.64%	23,579	17,948	79.28%
2018	N32 Menglembu	Chaw Kam Foon (DAP)	20,456	86.76%	Chin Kwai Leong (PSM)	248	1.05%	23,579	17,948	79.28%
2022	N32 Menglembu	Chaw Kam Foon (DAP)	22,875	87.93%	Phoon Kai Mun (MCA)	1,684	6.47%	26,284	21,191	67.94%
2022	N32 Menglembu	Chaw Kam Foon (DAP)	22,875	87.93%	Wong Kean Rong (BERSATU)	1,456	5.60%	26,284	21,191	67.94%
