= Howard Lee Chuan How =

Malaysian politician

Yang Berhormat Tuan Howard Lee Chuan How MP
- 李存孝
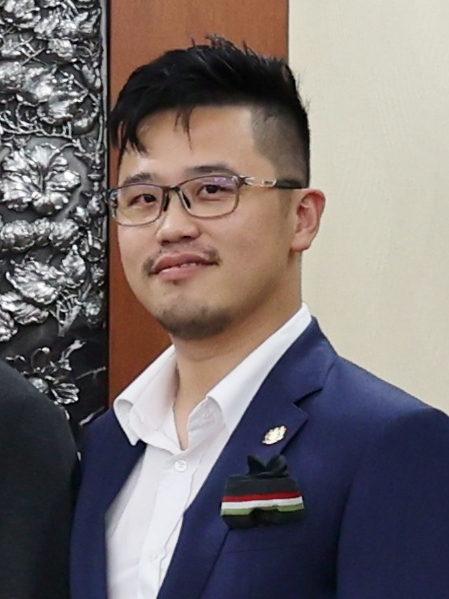
- Lee in 2024

Member of the Perak State Executive Council (Youth, Sports and Human Capital Development)
- In office 19 May 2018 – 10 March 2020
- Monarch: Nazrin Shah
- Menteri Besar: Ahmad Faizal Azumu
- Preceded by: Shahrul Zaman Yahya (Youth and Sports); Saarani Mohamad (Human Capital Development)
- Succeeded by: Khairul Shahril Mohamed (Youth and Sports); Razman Zakaria (Human Capital Development)
- Constituency: Pasir Pinji

Member of the Malaysian Parliament for Ipoh Timor
- Incumbent
- Assumed office 19 November 2022
- Preceded by: Wong Kah Woh (PH–DAP)
- Majority: 43,888 (2022)

Member of the Perak State Legislative Assembly for Pasir Pinji
- In office 5 May 2013 – 19 November 2022
- Preceded by: Thomas Su Keong Siong (PR–DAP)
- Succeeded by: Goh See Hua (PH–DAP)
- Majority: 22,387 (2013); 26,010 (2018)

National Political Education Director of the Democratic Action Party
- Incumbent
- Assumed office 16 March 2025
- Assistant: Vivian Wong Shir Yee
- Secretary-General: Anthony Loke Siew Fook
- Preceded by: Wong Kah Woh

Youth Chief of the Democratic Action Party
- In office 2 December 2018 – 19 March 2022
- Deputy: Chiong Yoke Kong
- Secretary-General: Anthony Loke Siew Fook
- Preceded by: Wong Kah Woh
- Succeeded by: Kelvin Yii Lee Wuen

4th Youth Chief of the Pakatan Harapan
- In office 12 September 2021 – 29 July 2022
- President: Wan Azizah Wan Ismail
- Chairman: Anwar Ibrahim
- Preceded by: Shazni Munir Mohd Ithnin
- Succeeded by: Kelvin Yii Lee Wuen

Faction represented in Dewan Rakyat
- 2022–: Pakatan Harapan

Faction represented in Perak State Legislative Assembly
- 2013–2018: Democratic Action Party
- 2018–2022: Pakatan Harapan

Personal details
- Born: Howard Lee Chuan How; 3 January 1983 (age 43) Ipoh, Perak, Malaysia
- Citizenship: Malaysian
- Party: Liberal Democrats (UK) (2010); Democratic Action Party (DAP) (since 2008)
- Other political affiliations: Pakatan Rakyat (PR) (2008–2015); Pakatan Harapan (PH) (since 2015)
- Spouse: Cherie Lai Cheau Yee
- Children: Bernice Lee E Qing
- Education: Great Yarmouth College
- Occupation: Politician
- Website: howardlee.My

Howard Lee Chuan How

Chinese name
- Traditional Chinese: 李存孝
- Simplified Chinese: 李存孝
Transcriptions
Standard Mandarin
- Hanyu Pinyin: Lǐ Cúnxiào
Yue: Cantonese
- Jyutping: Lei5 Cyun4 Haau3
Southern Min
- Hokkien POJ: Lí Chûn-hàu
- Tâi-lô: Lí Tsûn-hàu

Howard Lee Chuan How (Chinese: 李存孝; pinyin: Lǐ Cúnxiào; Jyutping: Lei5 Cyun4 Haau3; Pe̍h-ōe-jī: Lí Chûn-hàu; born 3 January 1983) is a Malaysian politician who has served as the Member of Parliament (MP) for Ipoh Timor since November 2022. He served as member of the Perak State Executive Council (EXCO) in the Pakatan Harapan (PH) state administration under former Menteri Besar Ahmad Faizal Azumu from May 2018 to March 2020 and Member of the Perak State Legislative Assembly (MLA) for Pasir Pinji from May 2013 to November 2022. He is a member of the Democratic Action Party (DAP), a component party of the PH coalition. He has served as the National Political Education Director of DAP since March 2025 and is the State Treasurer of DAP of Perak. He served as the Youth Chief of PH from September 2021 to July 2022 and the Youth Chief of DAP from December 2018 to March 2022. He was also the 24th President of International Union of Socialist Youth (IUSY).

== Early life ==
Lee was born in Ipoh in 1983 and was schooled at SRJK (C) Poi Lam until primary 6. He then continued his secondary education at Great Yarmouth High School & Technology College, United Kingdom, and completed a BTEC National Diploma in Science at Great Yarmouth FE College in the East of England.

Lee has been involved in politics & activism as early as the age of 16 when he was elected vice president of the local Student Union in the East of England. He was the general manager of a Pizza Hut in Norwich UK Lee and a few of his counterparts founded a civil and society movement that revitalized a previously neglected section of Norwich City, into a heritage attraction and booming retail district. Active in local politics throughout his working life, he also contested as a candidate under the UK Liberal Democrats at a City Council by election.

Lee returned to Malaysia at the end of 2007 saw the start of his involvement with DAP. He later joined DAP in January 2008 at the age of 25. He was appointed the campaign manager for Wong Kah Woh, the PR and DAP candidate for the Canning state seat who was making his electoral debut in the 2008 Perak state election.

== Political career ==
=== United Kingdom ===
In 2010, Lee contested in United Kingdom for the Norwich City Council by-election on a Liberal Democrats ticket but lost to the Labour Party candidate by 247 majority.

=== Malaysia ===
During the 2013 general election, Lee won the Pasir Pinji state seat polling 17,896 votes defeating Barisan National candidate with 13,632 majority.

In 2015, he was elected as one of the DAPSY central committee member and also Perak DAPSY Chief.

In 2016, Lee was also elected as the new President of IUSY, the largest political youth organisation in the world during the congress in Albania. He is the first Southeast Asian to be elected to the position, and this is the highest international position that DAPSY has achieved. He was also appointed into the board of the Progressive Alliance, the highest forum of the global organisation in his capacity as the IUSY President. He is also standing member of SocDem Asia's Steering Committee, representing DAP at the regional level

In 2017, Lee's loyalty towards Malaysia was questioned when it was revealed that he tried to obtain British naturalisation in 2002 and settlement visa in 2007 but were denied consecutively for both. He also had set up an online petition and a video plea seeking support to allow him to return to the United Kingdom upon coming back to Malaysia.

During the 2018 general election, Lee retained his state constituency of Pasir Pinji seat polling 23,282 votes, defeating Barisan Nasional candidate with 20,856 majority.

In the 2022 general election, Lee moved from Perak state politics to the federal politics after being nominated by PH to contest for the Ipoh Timor federal seat. He won the seat and was elected to Parliament as the Ipoh Timor MP by a majority of 43,888 votes in a landslide victory.

== Election results ==
Norwich City Council
| Year | Constituency | Candidate | Votes | Pct | Opponent(s) | Votes | Pct | Majority |
|---|---|---|---|---|---|---|---|---|
| 2010 | Lakenham | Howard Lee Chuan How (Liberal Democrats)^{[A]} | 652 | 25.9% | Victoria MacDonald (Labour) | 899 | 35.7% | 247 |
| 2010 | Lakenham | Howard Lee Chuan How (Liberal Democrats)^{[A]} | 652 | 25.9% | Kit Jones (Green) | 608 | 24.2% | 247 |
| 2010 | Lakenham | Howard Lee Chuan How (Liberal Democrats)^{[A]} | 652 | 25.9% | Christopher Benjamin (Conservative) | 243 | 9.7% | 247 |
| 2010 | Lakenham | Howard Lee Chuan How (Liberal Democrats)^{[A]} | 652 | 25.9% | Steve Emmens (UKIP) | 113 | 4.5% | 247 |

[A]Contested as Howard Lee.

Perak State Legislative Assembly
| Year | Constituency | Candidate | Votes | Pct | Opponent(s) | Votes | Pct | Ballots cast | Majority | Turnout |
|---|---|---|---|---|---|---|---|---|---|---|
| 2013 | N27 Pasir Pinji | Lee Chuan How (DAP) | 17,896 | 80.76% | Thong Fah Chong (MCA) | 4,264 | 19.24% | 22,387 | 13,632 | 81.02% |
| 2018 | N27 Pasir Pinji | Lee Chuan How (DAP) | 23,282 | 90.56% | Ng Kai Cheong (MCA) | 2,426 | 9.44% | 26,010 | 20,856 | 78.30% |

Parliament of Malaysia
| Year | Constituency | Candidate | Votes | Pct | Opponent(s) | Votes | Pct | Ballots cast | Majority | Turnout |
|---|---|---|---|---|---|---|---|---|---|---|
| 2022 | P064 Ipoh Timor | Lee Chuan How (DAP) | 57,549 | 72.14% | Nor Afzainzam Salleh (BERSATU) | 13,661 | 17.12% | 79,780 | 43,888 | 67.51% |
| 2022 | P064 Ipoh Timor | Lee Chuan How (DAP) | 57,549 | 72.14% | Ng Kai Cheong (MCA) | 8,570 | 10.74% | 79,780 | 43,888 | 67.51% |

== Honours ==
=== Honours of Malaysia ===
- Malaysia
  - Recipient of the 17th Yang di-Pertuan Agong Installation Medal
