= Lim Pek Har =

Malaysian politician

- 林碧霞

Member of the Perak State Legislative Assembly for Menglembu
- In office 8 March 2008 – 9 May 2018
- Preceded by: Keong Meng Sing (BA–DAP)
- Succeeded by: Steven Chaw Kam Foon (PH–DAP)
- Majority: 6,523 (2008); 16,799 (2013)

Personal details
- Born: Lim Pek Har; 26 March 1966 (age 60) Perak, Malaysia
- Citizenship: Malaysian
- Party: Democratic Action Party (DAP)
- Other political affiliations: Pakatan Rakyat (PR) (2008–2015); Pakatan Harapan (PH) (since 2015)
- Relations: Steven Chaw Kam Foon (cousin)
- Occupation: Politician

Lim Pek Har

Chinese name
- Traditional Chinese: 林碧霞
- Simplified Chinese: 林碧霞
- Hanyu Pinyin: Lín Bìxiá
- Jyutping: Lam4 Bik1 Haa4
- Hokkien POJ: Lîm Phek-hâ

Lim Pek Har (Chinese: 林碧霞; pinyin: Lín Bìxiá; Jyutping: Lam4 Bik1 Haa4; Pe̍h-ōe-jī: Lîm Phek-hâ; born 26 March 1966) is a Malaysian politician who served as Member of the Perak State Legislative Assembly (MLA) for Menglembu from March 2008 to May 2018. She is a member of the Democratic Action Party (DAP), a component party of the Pakatan Harapan (PH) and formerly Pakatan Rakyat (PR) coalitions. She is also the cousin of Steven Chaw Kam Foon, the Political Secretary to the Minister of Housing and Local Government and Menglembu MLA.

== Politics ==
In March 2018, shortly before the 2018 Perak state election, she was dropped by her party DAP. She did not defend the Menglembu seat in the election, paving the way for Chaw to contest for the seat. Chaw later won the seat and succeeded her as the Menglembu MLA.

== Election results ==
Perak State Legislative Assembly
Year	Constituency	Candidate	Votes	Pct.	Opponent(s)	Votes	Pct.	Ballots cast	Majority	Turnout
2004	N33 Tronoh	Lim Pek Har (DAP)	6,664	43.00%	Lee Kon Yin (MCA)	8,419	54.33%	15,496	1,755	65.78%
2008	N32 Menglembu	Lim Pek Har (DAP)	13,305	65.45%	Christina Teoh Ai Ling (MCA)	6,782	33.36%	20,330	6,523	75.15%
2013	N32 Menglembu	Lim Pek Har (DAP)	20,694	83.16%	Loo Gar Yen (MCA)	3,895	15.65%	24,886	16,799	81.10%
