= Menglembu (state constituency) =

Political subdivision in Malaysia

Menglembu (N32)
Perak constituency

State constituency
- Legislature: Perak State Legislative Assembly
MLA
Steven Chaw Kam Foon
PH
- Constituency created: 1994
- First contested: 1994
- Last contested: 2022

Demographics
- Electors (2022): 38,689

Menglembu is a state constituency in Perak, Malaysia, that has been represented in the Perak State Legislative Assembly.

== Demographics ==
Ethnic breakdown of Menglembu's electorate as of 2022
1. Chinese (81.8%)
2. Indian (11.6%)
3. Malay (6.05%)
4. Other ethnicities (0.58%)

== History ==
=== Polling districts ===
According to the gazette issued on 31 October 2022, the Menglembu constituency has a total of 11 polling districts.

State constituency	Polling districts	Code	Location
Menglembu（N32）	Bandar Baru Menglembu	066/32/01	SMK Seri Keledang
Menglembu（N32）	Menglembu Lama	066/32/02	SMK Menglembu
Menglembu（N32）	Awana	066/32/03	SJK (C) Wan Hwa 1
Menglembu（N32）	Menglembu Barat	066/32/04	SJK (T) Menglembu
Menglembu（N32）	Menglembu Selatan	066/32/05	SMK Menglembu
Menglembu（N32）	Bukit Merah Timor	066/32/06	SJK (C) Bukit Merah
Menglembu（N32）	Bukit Merah Barat	066/32/07	SJK (C) Bukit Merah
Menglembu（N32）	Bukit Merah Tengah	066/32/08	SJK (C) Bukit Merah
Menglembu（N32）	Bukit Merah Barat Daya	066/32/09	SJK (C) Bukit Merah
Menglembu（N32）	Bukit Merah Selatan	066/32/10	Dewan Orang Ramai Bukit Merah
Menglembu（N32）	Lahat	066/32/11	SJK (C) Lahat

=== Representation history ===
Members of the Legislative Assembly for Menglembu
Assembly	No	Years	Name	Party
Constituency created from Falim and Lahat
9th	N27	1995-1999	Liew Kai Chay @ Liew Choong Sang (刘忠生)	BN (MCA)
10th	N27	1999-2004	Keong Meng Sing (龚明勋)	BA (DAP)
11th	N32	2004-2008	Keong Meng Sing (龚明勋)	DAP
12th	N32	2008-2013	Lim Pek Har (林碧霞)	PR (DAP)
13th	N32	2013-2018	Lim Pek Har (林碧霞)	PR (DAP)
14th	N32	2018-2022	Steven Chaw Kam Foon (周锦欢)	PH (DAP)
15th	N32	2022–present	Steven Chaw Kam Foon (周锦欢)	PH (DAP)

== Election results ==
Perak state election, 2022
Party	Candidate	Votes	%	∆%
PH	Steven Chaw Kam Foon	22,875	87.93	▲87.93
BN	Phoon Kai Mun	1,684	6.47	▼4.33
PN	Wong Kean Rong	1,456	5.60	▲5.60
Total valid votes		26,015	100.00	
Total rejected ballots		229		
Unreturned ballots		40		
Turnout		26,284	67.94	▼11.34
Registered electors		38,689		
Majority		21,191	81.46	▲4.13
PH hold		Swing		

Perak state election, 2018
Party	Candidate	Votes	%	∆%
PKR	Steven Chaw Kam Foon	20,456	88.13	▲88.13
BN	Wong Kam Seng	2,508	10.80	▼5.04
Parti Sosialis Malaysia	Chin Kwai Leong	248	1.68	▲1.68
Total valid votes		23,212	98.44	
Total rejected ballots		222	0.94	
Unreturned ballots		145	0.61	
Turnout		23,579	79.28	▼1.82
Registered electors		29,743		
Majority		17,948	77.33	▲9.01
PKR hold		Swing		
Source(s) "RESULTS OF CONTESTED ELECTION AND STATEMENTS OF THE POLL AFTER THE OFFICIAL ADDITION OF VOTES".

Perak state election, 2013
Party	Candidate	Votes	%	∆%
DAP	Lim Pek Har	20,694	84.16	▲17.92
BN	Loo Gar Yen	3,895	15.84	▼17.92
Total valid votes		24,589	98.81	
Total rejected ballots		265	1.06	
Unreturned ballots		32	0.13	
Turnout		24,886	81.10	▲5.95
Registered electors		30,670		
Majority		16,799	68.32	▲35.84
DAP hold		Swing		
Source(s) "KEPUTUSAN PILIHAN RAYA UMUM DEWAN UNDANGAN NEGERI".

Perak state election, 2008
Party	Candidate	Votes	%	∆%
DAP	Lim Pek Har	13,305	66.24	▲7.45
BN	Christina Teoh Ai Ling	6,782	33.76	▼7.45
Total valid votes		20,087	98.80	
Total rejected ballots		243	1.20	
Unreturned ballots		0	0	
Turnout		20,330	75.15	▲3.02
Registered electors		27,053		
Majority		6,523	32.48	▲14.90
DAP hold		Swing		
Source(s) "KEPUTUSAN PILIHAN RAYA UMUM DEWAN UNDANGAN NEGERI PERAK BAGI TAHUN 2008".

Perak state election, 2004
Party	Candidate	Votes	%	∆%
DAP	Keong Meng Sing	10,611	58.79	▲4.39
BN	Loh Koi Pin	7,439	41.21	▼4.39
Total valid votes		18,050	97.93	
Total rejected ballots		350	1.90	
Unreturned ballots		31	0.17	
Turnout		18,431	72.13	▲4.56
Registered electors		25,553		
Majority		3,172	17.58	▲8.78
DAP hold		Swing		
Source(s) "KEPUTUSAN PILIHAN RAYA UMUM DEWAN UNDANGAN NEGERI PERAK BAGI TAHUN 2004".

Perak state election, 1999
Party	Candidate	Votes	%	∆%
DAP	Keong Meng Sing	11,136	54.40	▲8.79
BN	Liew Kay Chay @ Liew Choong Sang	9,336	45.60	▲8.79
Total valid votes		20,472	98.07	
Total rejected ballots		400	1.92	
Unreturned ballots		2	0.01	
Turnout		20,874	67.57	▼4.01
Registered electors		30,892		
Majority		1,800	8.80	▲0.02
DAP gain from BN		Swing		?
Source(s) "KEPUTUSAN PILIHAN RAYA UMUM DEWAN UNDANGAN NEGERI PERAK BAGI TAHUN 1999".

Perak state election, 1995
Party	Candidate	Votes	%
BN	Liew Kay Chay @ Liew Choong Sang	10,850	54.39
DAP	Lam Wai Mun	9,100	45.61
Total valid votes		19,950	96.81
Total rejected ballots		621	3.01
Unreturned ballots		36	0.17
Turnout		20,607	71.58
Registered electors		28,790	
Majority		1,750	8.78
This was a new constituency created.
Source(s) "KEPUTUSAN PILIHAN RAYA UMUM DEWAN UNDANGAN NEGERI PERAK BAGI TAHUN 1995".
