= Wong Kah Woh =

Malaysian politician (born 1980)

Yang Berhomat Tuan Wong Kah Woh MP
- 黄家和

Deputy Minister of Education
- Incumbent
- Assumed office 12 December 2023
- Monarchs: Abdullah (2023–2024); Ibrahim Iskandar (since 2024)
- Prime Minister: Anwar Ibrahim
- Minister: Fadhlina Sidek
- Preceded by: Lim Hui Ying
- Constituency: Taiping

Chairman of the Public Accounts Committee
- In office 27 August 2020 – 10 October 2022
- Nominated by: Muhyiddin Yassin
- Appointed by: Azhar Azizan Harun
- Deputy: Azizah Mohd Dun
- Preceded by: Noraini Ahmad
- Succeeded by: Mas Ermieyati Samsudin
- Constituency: Ipoh Timor

National Election Director of the Democratic Action Party
- Incumbent
- Assumed office 16 March 2025
- Secretary-General: Anthony Loke Siew Fook
- Preceded by: Position established

National Political Education Director of the Democratic Action Party
- In office 20 March 2022 – 16 March 2025
- Assistant: Wong Shu Qi
- Secretary-General: Anthony Loke Siew Fook
- Preceded by: Liew Chin Tong
- Succeeded by: Howard Lee Chuan How

Youth Chief of the Democratic Action Party
- In office 22 November 2015 – 2 December 2018
- Deputy: Wong King Wei
- Secretary-General: Lim Guan Eng
- Preceded by: Teo Kok Seong
- Succeeded by: Howard Lee Chuan How

Member of the Malaysian Parliament for Taiping
- Incumbent
- Assumed office 19 November 2022
- Preceded by: Teh Kok Lim (PH–DAP)
- Majority: 25,529 (2022)

Member of the Malaysian Parliament for Ipoh Timor
- In office 9 May 2018 – 19 November 2022
- Preceded by: Thomas Su Keong Siong (PR–DAP)
- Succeeded by: Howard Lee Chuan How (PH–DAP)
- Majority: 42,797 (2018)

Member of the Perak State Legislative Assembly for Canning
- In office 8 March 2008 – 9 May 2018
- Preceded by: Vincent Hooi Wy Hon (BN–Gerakan)
- Succeeded by: Jenny Choy Tsi Jen (PH–DAP)
- Majority: 5,666 (2008); 14,444 (2013)

Personal details
- Born: Wong Kah Woh; 19 June 1980 (age 46) Bidor, Batang Padang District, Perak, Malaysia
- Citizenship: Malaysian
- Party: Democratic Action Party (DAP)
- Other political affiliations: Pakatan Rakyat (PR) (2008–2015); Pakatan Harapan (PH) (since 2015)
- Spouse: Choo Sze Lin
- Children: 3
- Education: International Islamic University Malaysia
- Occupation: Politician
- Website: wongkahwoh-canning.blogspot.com

Wong Kah Woh (simplified Chinese: 黄家和; traditional Chinese: 黃家和; pinyin: Huáng Jiāhé; Jyutping: Wong4 Gaa1 Wo4; born 19 June 1980) is a Malaysian politician who has served as the Deputy Minister of Education in the Unity Government administration under Prime Minister Anwar Ibrahim and Minister Fadhlina Sidek since December 2023 and the Member of Parliament (MP) for Taiping since November 2022. He served as Chairman of the Public Accounts Committee (PAC) from August 2020 to October 2022 and Deputy Chairman of PAC from August 2018 to his promotion to the chairmanship in August 2020, MP for Ipoh Timor from May 2018 to November 2022 as well as Member of the Perak State Legislative Assembly (MLA) for Canning from March 2008 to May 2018. He is a member and State Secretary of Perak of the Democratic Action Party (DAP), a component party of the PH coalition. He has served as the National Election Director of DAP since March 2025. He served as the National Political Education Director of DAP from March 2022 to March 2025 and the Youth Chief of DAP from November 2015 to December 2018.

== Political career ==
=== Deputy Minister of Education (since 2023) ===
In a cabinet reshuffle on 12 December 2023, Wong joined the government after he was appointed the new Deputy Minister of Education to replace Lim Hui Ying who became the Deputy Minister of Finance. His minister Fadhlina Sidek welcomed his appointment and he said his first assignment in the position was to answer questions at the Dewan Negara on behalf of his ministry and he pledged to work with Fadhlina to ensure the effective implementation of the policies of his ministry.

== Election results ==
Perak State Legislative Assembly
Year	Constituency	Candidate	Votes	Pct	Opponent(s)	Votes	Pct	Ballots cast	Majority	Turnout
2008	N25 Canning	Wong Kah Woh (DAP)	13,923	60.92%	Vincent Hooi Wy Hon (Gerakan)	8,257	36.13%	22,854	5,666	71.44%
2013	N25 Canning	Wong Kah Woh (DAP)	21,068	75.02%	Ceylyn Tay Wei Lung (Gerakan)	6,624	23.59%	28,082	14,444	79.80%

Parliament of Malaysia
Year	Constituency	Candidate	Votes	Pct	Opponent(s)	Votes	Pct	Ballots cast	Majority	Turnout
2018	P064 Ipoh Timor	Wong Kah Woh (DAP)	56,519	80.46%	Kathleen Wong Mei Yin (MCA)	13,722	19.54%	71,726	42,797	78.40%
2022	P060 Taiping	Wong Kah Woh (DAP)	47,098	55.56%	See Tean Seng (Gerakan)	21,569	25.44%	84,769	25,529	69.73%
2022	P060 Taiping	Wong Kah Woh (DAP)	47,098	55.56%	Neow Choo Seong (MCA)	14,599	17.22%	84,769	25,529	69.73%
2022	P060 Taiping	Wong Kah Woh (DAP)	47,098	55.56%	Leow Thye Yih (IND)	1,154	1.36%	84,769	25,529	69.73%
2022	P060 Taiping	Wong Kah Woh (DAP)	47,098	55.56%	Mohganan Manikam (IND)	236	0.28%	84,769	25,529	69.73%
2022	P060 Taiping	Wong Kah Woh (DAP)	47,098	55.56%	A. Rama Moorthy @ Steven Ram (IND)	113	0.13%	84,769	25,529	69.73%

== Honours ==
=== Honours of Malaysia ===
- Malaysia
  - Recipient of the 17th Yang di-Pertuan Agong Installation Medal (2024)
