= Kathleen Wong =

Malaysian politician (born 1970)

- 黄美圆

Economic and Political Officer Australia High Commission Malaysia
- In office 2006–2011

Personal details
- Born: 12 October 1970 (age 55) Ipoh, Perak

Kathleen Wong

Chinese name
- Traditional Chinese: 黃美圓
- Simplified Chinese: 黄美圆
Transcriptions
Standard Mandarin
- Hanyu Pinyin: Huáng Měi Yuán
Yue: Cantonese
- Jyutping: Wong4 Mei5 Jyun4
Southern Min
- Hokkien POJ: N̂g Bí-îⁿ
- Tâi-lô: N̂g Bí-înn

Kathleen Wong Mei Yin (simplified Chinese: 黄美圆; traditional Chinese: 黃美圓; pinyin: Huáng Měi Yuán; Jyutping: Wong4 Mei5 Jyun4; Pe̍h-ōe-jī: N̂g Bí-îⁿ; born 12 October 1970) is a political activist promoting unity and harmony in Perak, Malaysia. Previously, she served as an Economic and Political Officer for the Australian High Commission in Malaysia. She acts as a liaison for the Australian and Malaysian government. She is a member of the Malaysian Chinese Association (MCA), a major component party of the Barisan Nasional (BN) coalition.

== Education ==
Born and raised in Perak, Kathleen Wong or fondly known as Kat Wong received her primary and secondary school education in Methodist Girl School in Ipoh, Perak. She later went on to pursue her A Level in Sunway College. She later went to New Zealand to Waikato University and obtained a bachelor's degree in Administration (1999).

== Career in government agencies ==
Kathleen Wong served in various government ministries and office before she decided to go into politics. She served as an assistant registrar for the Malaysian Election Commission (2005 to 2008), visiting board member for the Tengku Permaisuri Bainun Hospital (2004-2007) and Taman Ipoh/Canning Zone Coordinator for the Ipoh City Council (2003-2005).

== Joining politics ==
Kathleen Wong is the Director at Institute of Strategic Analysis and Policy Research (INSAP), a think-tank and research outfit that conducts research and analysis on politics, economics, education, women rights and development, social and other issues in Malaysia. She holds various positions in MCA; and in the 2013 general election; she was chosen by the Barisan Nasional committee to be the candidate to contest Ipoh Timor parliamentary seat but lost. In the 2018 general election; she was picked as the BN candidate to contest Ipoh Timor seat and she lost again.

== Election results ==
Parliament of Malaysia
Year	Constituency	Candidate	Votes	Pct	Opponent(s)	Votes	Pct	Ballots cast	Majority	Turnout
2013	P064 Ipoh Timor	Kathleen Wong Mei Yin (MCA)	15,086	23.13%	Su Keong Siong (DAP)	49,086	75.24%	65,217	34,000	79.70%
2018	P064 Ipoh Timor	Kathleen Wong Mei Yin (MCA)	13,722	19.54%	Wong Kah Woh (DAP)	56,519	80.46%	71,726	42,797	78.40%
