= Pasir Pinji (state constituency) =

Political subdivision in Malaysia

Pasir Pinji (N27)
Perak constituency

State constituency
- Legislature: Perak State Legislative Assembly
MLA
Goh See Hua
PH
- Constituency created: 1994
- First contested: 1995
- Last contested: 2022

Demographics
- Electors (2022): 39,394

Pasir Pinji is a state constituency in Perak, Malaysia. It is located in the Ipoh Timor federal constituency and has been represented in the Perak State Legislative Assembly by Goh See Hua of Pakatan Harapan (PH) since 2022.

== Demographics ==
Ethnic breakdown of Pasir Pinji's electorate as of 2022
1. Chinese (90.6%)
2. Malay (5.72%)
3. Indian (3.18%)
4. Other ethnicities (0.49%)

== History ==
=== Polling districts ===
According to the federal gazette issued on 31 October 2022, the Pasir Pinji constituency is divided into 11 polling districts.

State constituency	Polling districts	Code	Location
Pasir Pinji（N27）	Jalan Bendahara	064/27/01	SJK (C) Sam Chai
Pasir Pinji（N27）	Kampar Road	064/27/02	SMK (P) Methodist
Pasir Pinji（N27）	Housing Trust	064/27/03	SMK Raja Perempuan
Pasir Pinji（N27）	Pasir Pinji Utara	064/27/04	SJK (C) Pasir Pinji 1; SJK (C) Pasir Pinji 2
Pasir Pinji（N27）	Pasir Pinji Selatan	064/27/05	SMK Jalan Pasir Puteh
Pasir Pinji（N27）	Pinji Lane Utara	064/27/06	SJK (C) Sam Chai
Pasir Pinji（N27）	Pasir Puteh Utara	064/27/07	SK Raja Dihilir Ekram
Pasir Pinji（N27）	Pasir Puteh Baru	064/27/08	SMK Jalan Pasir Puteh
Pasir Pinji（N27）	Pinji Lane Selatan	064/27/09	SK Pinji
Pasir Pinji（N27）	Pasir Puteh Selatan	064/27/10	SK Kampong Pasir Puteh
Pasir Pinji（N27）	Taman Pengkalan Jaya	064/27/11	SK Jalan Pegoh

=== Representation history ===
Members of the Legislative Assembly for Pasir Pinji
Assembly	No	Years	Name	Party
Constituency created from Dermawan, Tebing Tinggi and Lahat
9th	N24	1995-1999	Chan Kam (陈绵)	BN (MCA)
10th	N24	1999-2004	Chan Kam (陈绵)	BN (MCA)
11th	N27	2004-2008	Thomas Su Keong Siong (苏建祥)	DAP
12th	N27	2008-2013	Thomas Su Keong Siong (苏建祥)	PR (DAP)
13th	N27	2013-2018	Howard Lee Chuan How (李存孝)	PR (DAP)
14th	N27	2018-2022	Howard Lee Chuan How (李存孝)	PH (DAP)
15th	N27	2022–present	Goh See Hua (吴锡华)	PH (DAP)

== Election results ==
Perak state election, 2022
Party	Candidate	Votes	%	∆%
PH	Goh See Hua	23,692	90.47	▲90.47
BN	Soo Poh Yeow	1,523	5.82	▼3.60
PN	Lam Kin Yip	973	3.72	▲3.72
Total valid votes		26,465	100.00	
Total rejected ballots		195		
Unreturned ballots		82		
Turnout		26,742	66.27	▼13.03
Registered electors		39,394		
Majority		22,169	84.65	▲3.49
PH hold		Swing		

Perak state election, 2018
Party	Candidate	Votes	%	∆%
PKR	Howard Lee Chuan How	23,282	90.58	▲90.58
BN	Ng Kai Cheong	2,426	9.42	▼9.82
Total valid votes		25,702	98.84	
Total rejected ballots		200	0.77	
Unreturned ballots		102	0.39	
Turnout		26,010	79.30	▼2.00
Registered electors		33,219		
Majority		20,856	81.16	▲19.64
PKR hold		Swing		
Source(s) "RESULTS OF CONTESTED ELECTION AND STATEMENTS OF THE POLL AFTER THE OFFICIAL ADDITION OF VOTES".

Perak state election, 2013
Party	Candidate	Votes	%	∆%
DAP	Howard Lee Chuan How	17,896	80.76	▲13.82
BN	Thong Fah Chong	4,264	19.24	▼13.82
Total valid votes		22,160	98.61	
Total rejected ballots		227	1.01	
Unreturned ballots		86	0.38	
Turnout		22,473	81.30	▲9.65
Registered electors		27,631		
Majority		13,632	61.52	▼27.64
DAP hold		Swing		
Source(s) "KEPUTUSAN PILIHAN RAYA UMUM DEWAN UNDANGAN NEGERI".

Perak state election, 2008
Party	Candidate	Votes	%	∆%
DAP	Thomas Su Keong Siong	12,526	66.94	▲8.29
BN	Khoo Boon Chuan	6,187	33.06	▼8.29
Total valid votes		18,713	98.25	
Total rejected ballots		250	1.31	
Unreturned ballots		84	0.44	
Turnout		19,047	71.65	▼1.87
Registered electors		26,583		
Majority		6,339	33.88	▲16.58
DAP hold		Swing		
Source(s) "KEPUTUSAN PILIHAN RAYA UMUM DEWAN UNDANGAN NEGERI PERAK BAGI TAHUN 2008".

Perak state election, 2004
Party	Candidate	Votes	%	∆%
DAP	Thomas Su Keong Siong	9,633	58.65	▲11.69
BN	Chan Kam	6,792	41.35	▼11.69
Total valid votes		16,425	97.06	
Total rejected ballots		307	1.81	
Unreturned ballots		191	1.13	
Turnout		16,923	69.78	▲3.83
Registered electors		24,251		
Majority		2,841	17.30	▲11.21
DAP gain from BN		Swing		?
Source(s) "KEPUTUSAN PILIHAN RAYA UMUM DEWAN UNDANGAN NEGERI PERAK BAGI TAHUN 2004".

Perak state election, 1999
Party	Candidate	Votes	%	∆%
BN	Chan Kam	8,868	53.05	▼0.59
DAP	Ngeh Koo Ham	7,849	46.96	▲0.95
Total valid votes		16,717	98.21	
Total rejected ballots		242	1.42	
Unreturned ballots		63	0.37	
Turnout		17,022	65.95	▼2.39
Registered electors		25,812		
Majority		1,019	6.09	▼1.19
BN hold		Swing		
Source(s) "KEPUTUSAN PILIHAN RAYA UMUM DEWAN UNDANGAN NEGERI PERAK BAGI TAHUN 1999".

Perak state election, 1995
Party	Candidate	Votes	%
BN	Chan Kam	8,901	53.64
DAP	Choo Sing Chye	7,692	46.36
Total valid votes		16,593	98.07
Total rejected ballots		275	1.63
Unreturned ballots		51	0.30
Turnout		16,919	68.34
Registered electors		24,757	
Majority		1,209	7.28
This was a new constituency created.
Source(s) "KEPUTUSAN PILIHAN RAYA UMUM DEWAN UNDANGAN NEGERI PERAK BAGI TAHUN 1995".
