= Thomas Su Keong Siong =

Malaysian politician and lawyer

Yang Berhormat Tuan Su Keong Siong MLA
- 苏建祥

Member of the Perak State Executive Council
- In office 28 March 2008 – 10 February 2009
- Monarch: Azlan Shah
- Menteri Besar: Mohammad Nizar Jamaluddin
- Portfolio: Higher Education, Science, Technology and Communications
- Preceded by: Zambry Abdul Kadir (Higher Education, Science and Technology); Ho Cheng Wang (Communications)
- Succeeded by: Mohamad Zahir Abdul Khalid (Higher Education, Science and Technology); Hamidah Osman (Communications)
- Constituency: Pasir Pinji

Member of the Pahang State Legislative Assembly for Ketari
- Incumbent
- Assumed office 19 November 2022
- Preceded by: Young Syefura Othman (PH–DAP)
- Majority: 120 (2022)

Member of the Malaysian Parliament for Kampar
- In office 9 May 2018 – 19 November 2022
- Preceded by: Ko Chung Sen (PR–DAP)
- Succeeded by: Chong Zhemin (PH–DAP)
- Majority: 11,801 (2018)

Member of the Malaysian Parliament for Ipoh Timor
- In office 5 May 2013 – 9 May 2018
- Preceded by: Lim Kit Siang (PR–DAP)
- Succeeded by: Wong Kah Woh (PH–DAP)
- Majority: 34,000 (2013)

Member of the Perak State Legislative Assembly for Pasir Pinji
- In office 21 March 2004 – 5 May 2013
- Preceded by: Cham Kam (BN–MCA)
- Succeeded by: Howard Lee Chuan How (PR–DAP)
- Majority: 2,841 (2004); 6,339 (2008)

Faction represented in Pahang State Legislative Assembly
- 2022–: Pakatan Harapan

Faction represented in Dewan Rakyat
- 2013–2018: Democratic Action Party
- 2018–2022: Pakatan Harapan

Faction represented in Perak State Legislative Assembly
- 2004–2013: Democratic Action Party

Personal details
- Born: Thomas Su Keong Siong; 18 September 1966 (age 60) Sitiawan, Perak, Malaysia
- Citizenship: Malaysian
- Party: Democratic Action Party (DAP)
- Other political affiliations: Barisan Alternatif (BA) (1999–2004); Pakatan Rakyat (PR) (2008–2015); Pakatan Harapan (PH) (since 2015)
- Education: University of Wolverhampton
- Occupation: Politician
- Profession: Lawyer

Su Keong Siong (simplified Chinese: 苏建祥; traditional Chinese: 蘇建祥; pinyin: Sū Jiànxiáng; Pe̍h-ōe-jī: So͘ Kiàn-siông; born 18 September 1966) also known as Thomas Su is a Malaysian politician and lawyer who has served as the member of the Pahang State Legislative Assembly (MLA) for Ketari since November 2022. He served as the Member of Parliament (MP) for Kampar from May 2018 to November 2022, for Ipoh Timor from May 2013 to May 2018, Member of the Perak State Executive Council (EXCO) in the Pakatan Rakyat (PR) state administration under former Menteri Besar Mohammad Nizar Jamaluddin from March 2008 to the collapse of the PR state administration in February 2009 and Perak MLA for Pasir Pinji from March 2004 to May 2013. He is a member of Democratic Action Party (DAP), a component party of the Pakatan Harapan (PH) and formerly PR and Barisan Alternatif (BA) coalitions. He is also a member of the Central Executive Committee (CEC) of the DAP.

== Earlier career ==
A lawyer by profession, he earned an LL.M. cum laude from University of Wolverhampton before returning to Malaysia to work for C K LEONG & CO. in Ipoh. He was admitted to the Malaysian bar in 1994.

== Political career ==
Su first involved in politics when he contested but lost as DAP candidate in 1999 for the state seat of Malim Nawar in Perak. He however was elected to the Perak State Assembly in 2004 and again in 2008 for the constituency of Pasir Pinji in Perak. During the short Pakatan Rakyat (PR) coalition rules of Perak, he was elected as an exco member in the state government led by Menteri Besar Nizar Jamaluddin in 2008. In the 2013 election Su won the Ipoh Timor parliamentary seat and succeeded incumbent Lim Kit Siang as its MP, who contested in Gelang Patah in Johor. In the 2018 election Su contested and won the Kampar parliamentary seat instead. Su change seat again in 2022, this time for Pahang State Assembly seat Ketari, replacing incumbent Young Syefura Othman who contested the federal seat of Bentong instead. Su won the seat with a slim majority of 120 votes, defeating the Barisan Nasional and Perikatan Nasional candidates.

== Controversy ==
In 2013, he was charged under the Peaceful Assembly Act 2012 with starting a peaceful assembly "without prior notice". Prior to a ruling on these charges, a 2014 ruling by the Court of Appeal found the law's requirement of giving ten-day prior notice before holding a peaceful assembly unconstitutional, and Su applied for the charges to be dismissed accordingly. He was ultimately given a discharge not amounting to acquittal. Without an acquittal, Su was later charged again for the same alleged offense in 2016. In 2018 the Sessions Court acquitted Su after the attorney general's chambers withdrew the charges. According to human resources minister M. Kulasegaran, the then recently elected Pakatan Harapan government had instructed the attorney general to review Section 9(1) of the Peaceful Assembly Act 2012, which was the provision under which Su had been charged. Su's lead counsel Ramkarpal Singh called Su's acquittal a positive step towards abolishing that provision, which he said "curtails freedom of speech."

== Election results ==
Perak State Legislative Assembly
Year	Constituency	Candidate	Votes	Pct	Opponent(s)	Votes	Pct	Ballots cast	Majority	Turnout
1999	N39 Malim Nawar	Su Keong Siong (DAP)	4,699	30.56%	Lee Chee Leong (MCA)	10,678	69.44%	15,833	5,979	61.93%
2004	N27 Pasir Pinji	Su Keong Siong (DAP)	9,633	56.92%	Cham Kam (MCA)	6,792	40.13%	16,923	2,841	69.78%
2008	N27 Pasir Pinji	Su Keong Siong (DAP)	12,526	65.76%	Khoo Boon Chuan (MCA)	6,187	32.48%	19,047	6,339	71.65%

Parliament of Malaysia
Year	Constituency	Candidate	Votes	Pct	Opponent(s)	Votes	Pct	Ballots cast	Majority	Turnout
2013	P064 Ipoh Timor	Su Keong Siong (DAP)	49,086	75.24%	Kathleen Wong Mei Yin (MCA)	15,086	23.13%	65,217	34,000	79.70%
2018	P070 Kampar	Su Keong Siong (DAP)	30,216	57.56%	Lee Chee Leong (MCA)	18,415	35.08%	53,567	11,801	77.15%
2018	P070 Kampar	Su Keong Siong (DAP)	30,216	57.56%	Yougan Mahalingam (PAS)	3,864	7.36%	53,567	11,801	77.15%

Pahang State Legislative Assembly
Year	Constituency	Candidate	Votes	Pct	Opponent(s)	Votes	Pct	Ballots cast	Majority	Turnout
2022	N34 Ketari	Su Keong Siong (DAP)	9,722	41.17%	Amizar Abu Adam (UMNO)	9,602	40.66%	23,614	120	76.77%
2022	N34 Ketari	Su Keong Siong (DAP)	9,722	41.17%	William Tan Wei Leong (Gerakan)	4,290	18.17%	23,614	120	76.77%
