= East Coast College =

Coordinates: 52.4823°N 1.7436°E

East Coast College (Lowestoft Campus)

Location
- St. Peter's Street; Lowestoft, Suffolk, NR32 2NB; England

Information
- Type: Further and Higher Education
- Motto: from passion to profession
- Established: 1898
- Local authority: Suffolk
- CEO/Principal: Paul Padda
- Gender: Coeducational
- Age: Pre16 through close school relationships, 16-18, Adults and HE Degree provision+
- Website: http://www.eastcoast.ac.uk/

East Coast College is a Further Education (FE) college which has campuses in Lowestoft, Suffolk and Great Yarmouth, Norfolk. Following a six-month pilot area review in 2014, it was proposed that the merger of Great Yarmouth College and Lowestoft College would result in improved education and training provision locally. The colleges have now formed a Federation as East Coast College. The colleges formally merged in the Summer of 2017 ready for the new academic year. East Coast College is a partner college of the University of Suffolk and the Lowestoft campus boasts specialist maritime and offshore training opportunities.

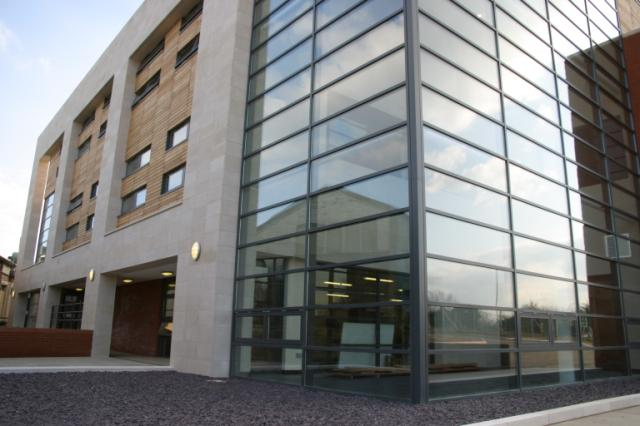
The Sir Christopher Cockerell Building at East Coast Colleges Lowestoft campus

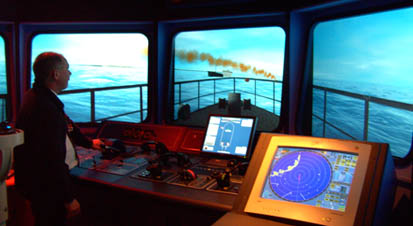
East Coast Colleges Maritime Bridge Simulator

== History ==
Records show that classes in science, navigation and astronomy were administered by the Town Council of Lowestoft in the late 19th century. The first Technical Institute was built in 1898 on a site in Clapham Road at a cost of £7,500. The site grew steadily for the next 40 years, developing a number of technical specialisms, together with courses in navigation and art. The institute was damaged during enemy air action in 1940 and then completely destroyed in a second air attack in 1941. Accommodation was soon found for the provision of full-time instruction in Navigation at St John's Church schoolroom until the war's end. A School of Cookery was established during the war years and achieved great success.

Following the war, the volume of work reduced through the withdrawal of naval personnel, but also through a lack of accommodation. The Institute had become seven disparate hired centres. Moreover, development, possible in other areas, had been difficult within Lowestoft due its fortress nature in the war years where the focus had been very much on the training of naval personnel. Day release classes associated with industry were unknown.

1947 saw the first of the "new" buildings, opened in Herring Fishery Score and in Victoria Road, Oulton Broad. They accommodated the Engineering and Commerce Departments as well as a Building Department. The latter, as well as the Engineering Department, organised the first day release classes and the long journey leading to the new college had begun.

Throughout the post-war period the School of Art established itself, first in the old Morton Road School and then additionally in the Regent Road centre, where it flourished and soon joined the other departments, becoming an integral part of the new College of Further Education in Lowestoft.

Negotiations for a new and consolidated site began in 1952 and the present site was agreed in 1954, finally opening in 1965.

Miss C. Musson MBE ATD ARCA was appointed first as head of the Lowestoft School of Art and later also as Principal of the Technical Institute and School of Navigation. She was the first woman to be admitted to membership of the Principals of Technical Institutions. Amongst many extraordinary accomplishments, one her most memorable was the organisation of 12 Domestic Science mistresses to train men in galley cooking for the Patrol Fleet based on Lowestoft. In four years 5,500 cooks were each given a six weeks course, and the health of the patrol boat crews improved in consequence.

== Maritime, Energy and Engineering ==
Lowestoft has a strong Maritime heritage and the college has close links to the Maritime and Energy industries. Its specialist Maritime provision attracts many international students for Captaincy accreditation, as well as supporting the growing needs of the East of England's renewables sectors. Current facilities include Bridge Simulation, Electronic Navigation and Charting as well as Survival at Sea training where a range of severe weather conditions are simulated in a dedicated environmental pool.

== The Sir Christopher Cockerell Building ==
The Sir Christopher Cockerell building was opened in April 2007 by Lord Somerleyton and Frances Cockerell, daughter of Sir Christopher Cockerell CBE FRS, housing the Construction trades, Boat Building and Engineering.
