= Pakatan Harapan =

Malaysian political coalition

- English name: Alliance of Hope
- Abbreviation: PH
- President: Wan Azizah Wan Ismail
- Chairman: Anwar Ibrahim
- Secretary-General: Saifuddin Nasution Ismail
- Deputy President: Anthony Loke Siew Fook; Mohamad Sabu
- Founded: 22 September 2015
- Legalised: 16 May 2018
- Preceded by: Pakatan Rakyat
- Headquarters: A-1-09 Merchant Square, Jalan Tropicana Selatan 1, 47410 Petaling Jaya (PH Secretariat and PKR); Kuala Lumpur (DAP and AMANAH)
- Newspaper: The Rocket; RoketKini; Suara Keadilan; Media Oren; Harapan Daily
- Student wing: Pakatan Harapan Students
- Youth wing: Pakatan Harapan Youth
- Women's wing: Pakatan Harapan Women
- Ideology: Progressivism; Multiracialism
- Political position: Centre to centre-left
- National affiliation: Warisan Plus (2016–2021) (Note: From 2018 to 2020, PH was senior partner in federal coalition government, while Warisan was the senior partner in Sabah coalition government); National Unity Government (since 2022)
- Member parties: PKR; DAP; AMANAH
- Colours: Red; White
- Dewan Negara: 19 / 70
- Dewan Rakyat: 75 / 222
- State Legislative Assemblies: 125 / 612
- Chief minister of states: 2 / 13

Election symbol
- (except DAP Sarawak) (DAP Sarawak only)

Party flag

Website
- pakatanharapan.my 2022 campaign website

Pakatan Harapan (PH; stylised as HARAPAN; English: Alliance of Hope) is a Malaysian political coalition consisting of centrist and centre-left political parties which was formed in 2015 to succeed the Pakatan Rakyat coalition. It has led a grand coalition government since November 2022, having previously led a single-coalition government from May 2018 to February 2020.

It is currently the largest coalition in the Dewan Rakyat with 77 seats and is part of the state governments of 5 of 13 states in the country, comprising Penang, Selangor, Perak, Pahang, and Sabah.

The coalition consists of the Democratic Action Party (DAP), People's Justice Party (PKR) and Parti Amanah Negara (AMANAH).

The coalition deposed the Barisan Nasional coalition government during the 2018 Malaysian general election, ending its 60-year-long reign (counted together with its predecessor, Alliance) since independence. Pakatan Harapan fell from power as a result of the 2020 Malaysian political crisis, when its chairman and then-Prime Minister Mahathir Mohamad resigned from office, and his Malaysian United Indigenous Party (BERSATU) left the coalition along with 11 members of parliament from PKR.

After the 2022 Malaysian general election resulted in a hung parliament, Pakatan Harapan entered into coalition with Barisan Nasional (BN), Gabungan Parti Sarawak (GPS), Gabungan Rakyat Sabah (GRS), WARISAN, Parti Bangsa Malaysia (PBM), Malaysian United Democratic Alliance (MUDA), Social Democratic Harmony Party (KDM), and independents to form what is commonly referred to as a national unity government, with PH chairman Anwar Ibrahim as prime minister.

== History ==
=== Formation ===
Pakatan Harapan is a direct successor to the three-party Pakatan Rakyat coalition that consisted of the People's Justice Party, the Democratic Action Party and the Pan-Malaysian Islamic Party (PAS). Disagreements and conflict between PAS and DAP mainly regarding the implementation of sharia law resulted in the predecessor coalition's break-up in June 2015, and it was replaced by a new coalition in September 2015 formed by the remnants of Pakatan Rakyat and a new PAS splinter party, the National Trust Party.

On 12 November 2016, a United Malays National Organisation (UMNO) splinter party, the Malaysian United Indigenous Party (BERSATU), founded and led by former Malaysian prime minister, Mahathir Mohamad, confirmed that the party was committed to joining Pakatan Harapan. It succeeded in forming an electoral pact with the coalition in December before finally becoming a member in March the next year.

=== Rise to power ===
The coalition's presidential council was confirmed in preparation for the coalition's registration. Mahathir was made the coalition's chairman and Wan Azizah Wan Ismail president, with then-imprisoned opposition leader and Wan Azizah's husband Anwar de facto leader. The logo was initially planned to be used by all participating candidates for the 2018 general election, but was rejected by Registrar of Societies and cited as a reason as to why the coalition could not be registered, while the Home Affairs Ministry later cited "issues" related to DAP and BERSATU after a new logo was submitted. The coalition was not registered in time for the general election and in pursuance of its plan to contest under a common logo, it was announced that the component parties would use the logo of PKR on the ballots instead, except in Sabah and Sarawak, where the local party chapters opted to use their respective logos. The coalition secured an electoral pact with the Sabah-based Sabah Heritage Party (WARISAN) before the election, with party president Shafie Apdal promising members it would be represented in the federal cabinet if the coalition came to power.

In the 2018 election held on 9 May, Pakatan Harapan managed to win a simple majority of seats in the Dewan Rakyat, dislodging Barisan as the ruling coalition and ending its 60-year long stint in government. Following the coalition's victory, the United Pasokmomogun Kadazandusun Murut Organisation announced their exit from Barisan and that they would seek to form a state government in Sabah with WARISAN and Pakatan Harapan.

The coalition also formed the government in the states of Kedah, Penang, Perak, Selangor, Malacca, Negeri Sembilan, Johor and Sabah. (Note: The state government of Sabah was formed with a confidence and supply agreement with WARISAN and UPKO.) It commanded a two-thirds majority in the states of Penang, Selangor and Johor.

Two days after a court date had been set for a hearing on the issue of the coalition's non-registration lodged against the Registrar, it was announced that Pakatan's registration had been officially approved on 17 May, eight days after its victory in the election.

In a 2020 article published in the ISEAS – Yusof Ishak Institute Journal of Southeast Asian Affairs, the Australian academic Ross Tapsell wrote of the coalition's efforts to ensure an independent process for former prime minister Najib's trial on corruption charges, the establishment of an independent anti-corruption commission, and the repealing of anti-fake news legislation, but also of the lack of action regarding decentralisation in relation to the Borneon states of Sabah and Sarawak, education reform, issues relating to the country's indigenous peoples (Orang Asli), racial inequality and political patronage, commenting that the Pakatan government was distracted by factional infighting.

=== Fall from power ===
Mahathir unexpectedly resigned as prime minister on 24 February 2020. His party, controlling 26 members of parliament, withdrew from the coalition in support of his decision, along with 11 members of parliament from the People's Justice Party led by Anwar's deputy, Azmin Ali. The announcement was made amid speculation that Mahathir intended to form a new governing coalition that would've excluded Anwar, fueled in part by questions raised by the latter's supporters over his status as Mahathir's designated successor, which CNN reported as part of the pair's longstanding rivalry. Despite this, Anwar believed that Mahathir was not member to any plans to exclude him from power. The political crisis sparked by Mahathir's resignation culminated in the coalition government's collapse, as it no longer had a majority in parliament. Eventually, a new rival coalition led by Mahathir's deputy, Muhyiddin Yassin, consisting of BERSATU and PAS named Perikatan Nasional, formed a new government with the support of Barisan.

The coalition thus lost its control over the states of Johor, Malacca, Perak and Kedah while a number of PKR, DAP and AMANAH representatives in those state assemblies left their parties and expressed support for the incoming state governments led by Perikatan.

=== Return to power ===
In the 2022 Malaysian general election, Pakatan won most of its seats in the Dewan Rakyat in the states of Selangor, Johor, Penang, Perak, Melaka, and Negeri Sembilan, while losing to Perikatan Nasional candidates in the states of Kelantan, Terengganu, Kedah, and Perlis by large margins. It won the largest number of seats with 82, but fell short of the 112 needed for a simple majority. It formed a grand coalition with Barisan Nasional, two other coalitions, four parties, and independents following the Yang di-Pertuan Agong's counsel that a unity government should be formed as a result of the hung parliament. While an offer was extended to Perikatan, it chose to sit as the official opposition. This arrangement was replicated on the state-level, with Pakatan participating in the government of seven states while providing confidence and supply in Johor.

Of the four states that chose to hold state elections simultaneously, Pakatan won 24 seats in the Perak State Legislative Assembly, 1 in the Perlis State Legislative Assembly and 8 in the Pahang State Legislative Assembly. It formed a coalition government with Barisan Nasional in Perak and Pahang.

== International relations ==
While the Pakatan Harapan coalition is not a member of any political internationals or confederations, some of its component parties are. The Democratic Action Party is a founding member of the Progressive Alliance. The People's Justice Party was listed as an observer member of the Liberal International but has since been de-listed after its leader Anwar Ibrahim publicly denied that the party was a member of any political international.

== Member parties ==
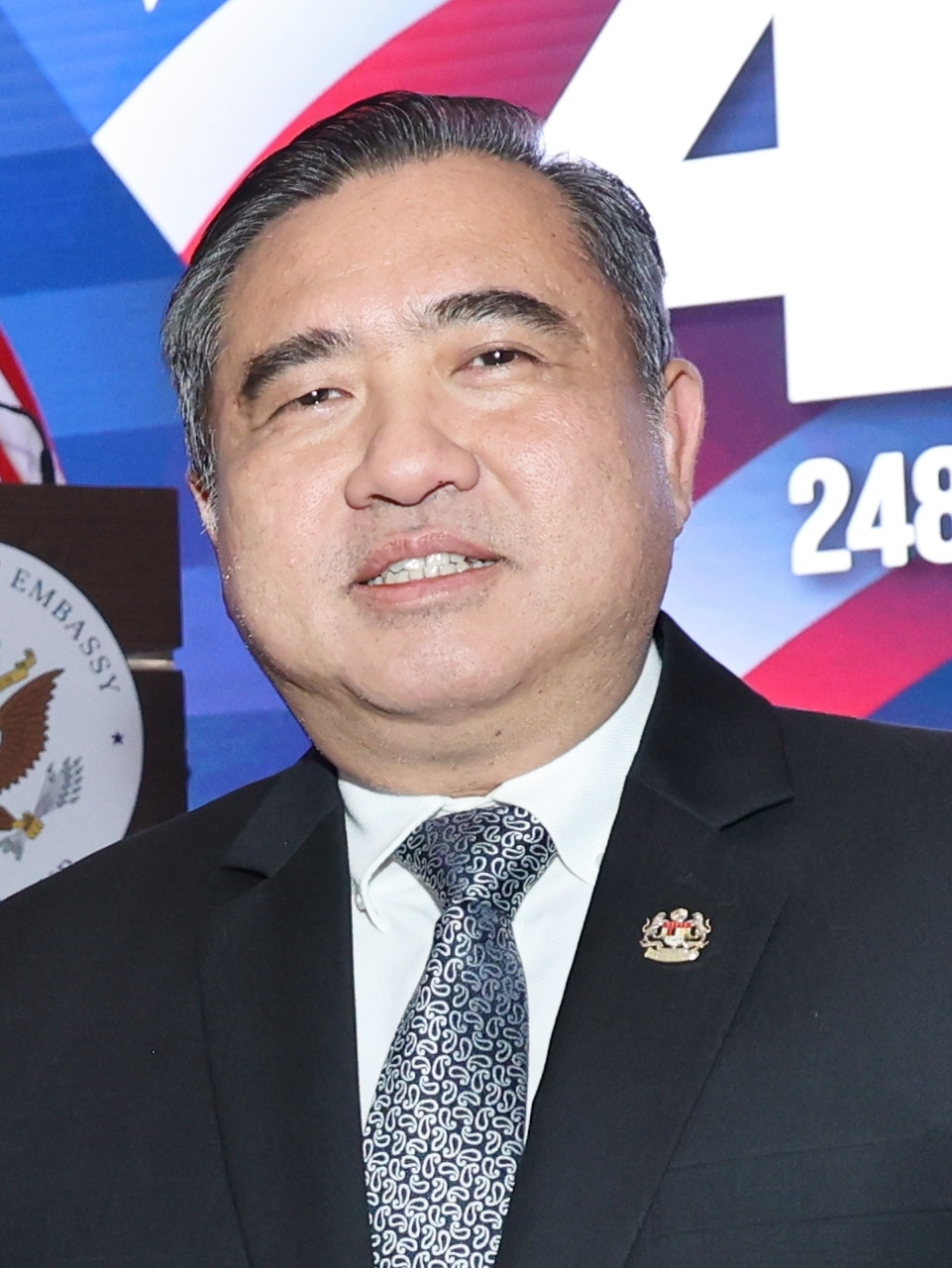
Anthony Loke, Secretary-General of the Democratic Action Party (DAP).

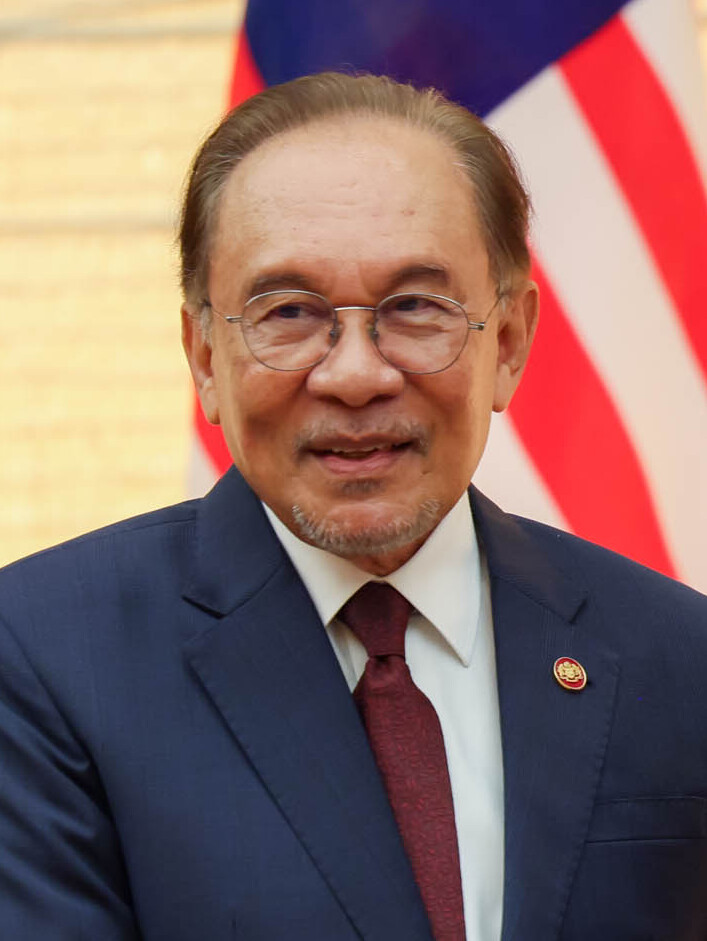
Anwar Ibrahim, the incumbent Chairman of Pakatan Harapan (PH) and President of the People's Justice Party (PKR).

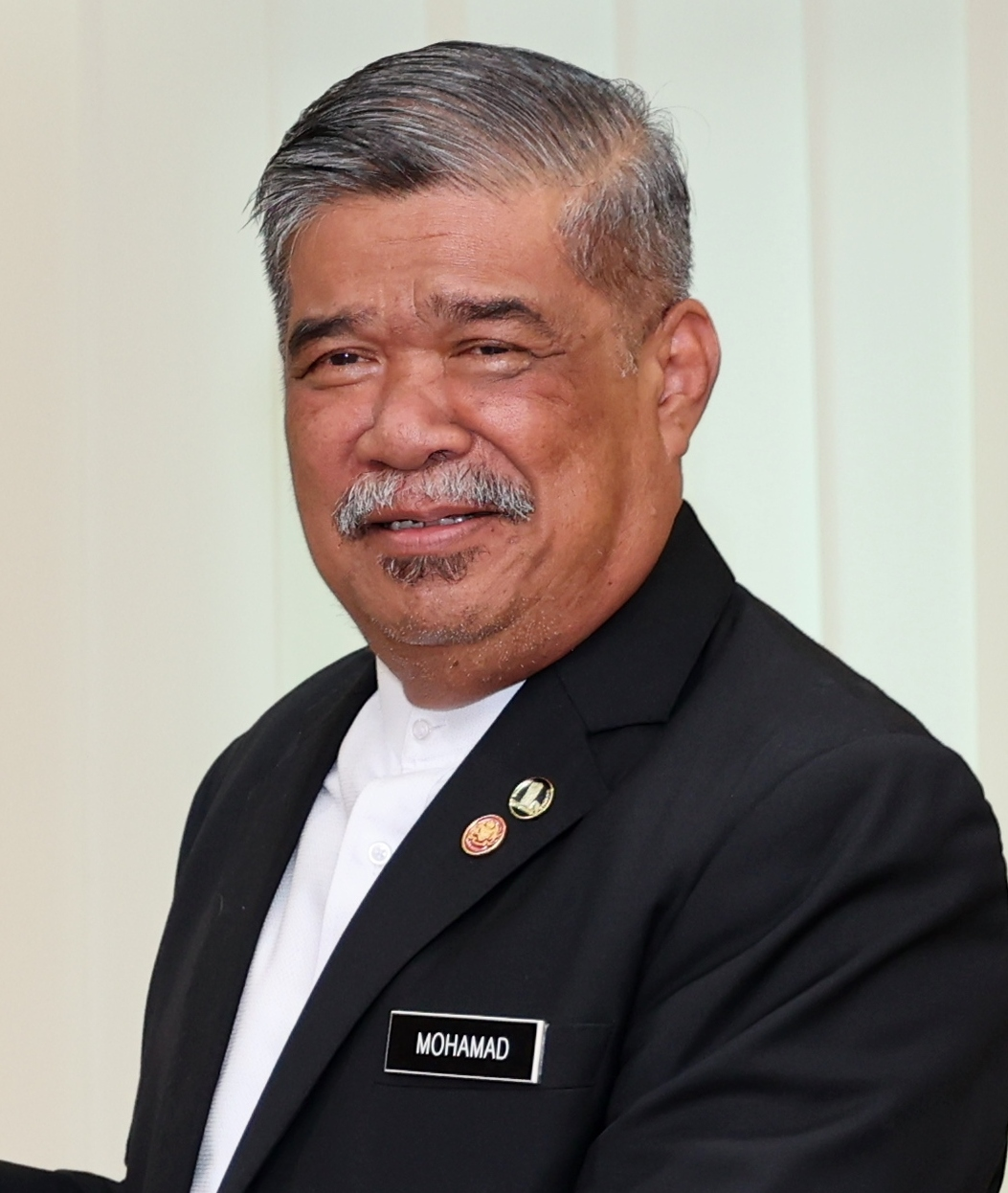
Mohamad Sabu, President of the National Trust Party (AMANAH).

Flag	Name		Ideology	Position	Leader(s)	Seats contested	2022 result		Current seats	State Legislature seats
Flag	Name		Ideology	Position	Leader(s)	Seats contested	Votes (%)	Seats	Composition	State Legislature seats
Member parties
	DAP	Democratic Action Party; Parti Tindakan Demokratik	Social democracy Multiculturalism	Centre-left	Anthony Loke Siew Fook	55	15.61%	40 / 222	40 / 75	80 / 612
	PKR	People's Justice Party; Parti Keadilan Rakyat	Reformism; Anti-corruption	Centre	Anwar Ibrahim	102	15.74%	31 / 222	27 / 75	35 / 612
	AMANAH	National Trust Party; Parti Amanah Negara	Islamic democracy Progressivism	Centre	Mohamad Sabu	54	5.70%	8 / 222	8 / 75	10 / 612

=== Former member parties ===
- Malaysian United Indigenous Party (BERSATU), (2017–2020)
- United Progressive Kinabalu Organisation (UPKO), (2021–2025)

=== Former allied parties ===
This list excludes parties allied to Pakatan Harapan solely by virtue of coalition of coalitions entered by Pakatan Harapan

*denotes defunct parties

- Heritage Party/Sabah Heritage Party (WARISAN), (2016–2021)
- Malaysian Advancement Party (MAP), (2018–2020)
- United Progressive Kinabalu Organisation (UPKO), (2018–2021)
- Minority Rights Action Party (MIRA), (2018)
- Homeland Fighter's Party (PEJUANG), (2020)
- Parti Sarawak Bersatu (PSB), (2019–2021)*
- Malaysian United Democratic Alliance (MUDA), (2021–2023)
- Love Sabah Party (PCS), (2022–2023)

== Organisational structure ==
=== Central Leadership Council ===
- Chairman:
  - Anwar Ibrahim (PKR)
- President:
  - Wan Azizah Wan Ismail (PKR)
- Deputy President:
  - Anthony Loke Siew Fook (DAP)
  - Mohamad Sabu (AMANAH)
- Vice-President:
  - Chong Chieng Jen (DAP)
  - M. Kulasegaran (DAP)
  - Christina Liew (PKR)
- Secretary-General:
  - Saifuddin Nasution Ismail (PKR)
- Treasurer:
  - Khalid Abdul Samad (AMANAH)
- Women's Chief:
  - Aiman Athirah Sabu (AMANAH)
- Youth Chief:
  - Woo Kah Leong (DAP)
- Elections Director:
  - Amirudin Shari (PKR)
- Communications Director:
  - Fahmi Fadzil (PKR)
- Strategic Director:
  - Vacant
- Information Chief:
  - Teo Nie Ching (DAP)
- Chief Whip:
  - Anthony Loke Siew Fook (DAP)
- State Chairman:
  - Johor: Aminolhuda Hassan (AMANAH)
  - Kedah: Saifuddin Nasution Ismail (PKR)
  - Kelantan: Adly Zahari (AMANAH)
  - Malacca: Adly Zahari (AMANAH)
  - Negeri Sembilan: Aminuddin Harun (PKR)
  - Pahang: Farhan Ahmad Fauzi (PKR)
  - Perak: Mujahid Yusof Rawa (AMANAH)
  - Perlis: Noor Amin Ahmad (PKR)
  - Penang: Chow Kon Yeow (DAP)
  - Sabah: Mustapha Sakmud (PKR)
  - Sarawak: Chong Chieng Jen (DAP)
  - Selangor: Amirudin Shari (PKR)
  - Terengganu: Mohd Hasbie Muda (AMANAH)
  - Federal Territories: Tan Kok Wai (DAP)
- State Deputy Chairperson:
  - Johor:
    - Teo Nie Ching (DAP)
    - Syed Ibrahim Syed Noh (PKR)
  - Kedah:
    - Nor Azrina Surip (PKR)
    - Mohd Asmirul Anuar Aris (AMANAH)
    - Tan Kok Yew (DAP)
  - Kelantan:
    - Mohamad Suparadi Md Noor (PKR)
    - Poa Yin Chai (DAP)
  - Malacca:
    - Khoo Poay Tiong (DAP)
    - Mohd Rafee Ibrahim (PKR)
    - Ashraf Muklis Minghat (AMANAH)
  - Negeri Sembilan:
    - Anthony Loke Siew Fook (DAP)
    - Mk Ibrahim Abdul Rahman (AMANAH)
  - Pahang:
    - Lee Chin Cheh (DAP)
    - Zulkifli Mohamed (AMANAH)
  - Perak:
    - Nga Kor Ming (DAP)
    - Asmuni Awi (AMANAH)
    - Mohamad Hairul Amir Sabri (PKR)
  - Perlis:
    - Wan Kharizal Wan Khazim (AMANAH)
    - Teh Seng Chuan (DAP)
  - Penang:
    - Steven Sim Chee Keong (DAP)
    - Nurul Izzah Anwar (PKR)
    - Muhammad Faiz Fadzil (AMANAH)
  - Sabah:
    - Phoong Jin Zhe (DAP)
    - Lahirul Latigu (AMANAH)
  - Sarawak:
    - Roland Engan (PKR)
    - Abang Abd Halil Abang Naili (AMANAH)
  - Selangor:
    - Ng Sze Han (DAP)
    - Izham Hashim (AMANAH)
  - Terengganu:
    - Ahmad Nazri Mohd Yusof (PKR)
    - Cheong Siow Foon (DAP)
  - Federal Territories:
    - Azman Abidin (PKR)
    - Khalid Abdul Samad (AMANAH)

=== Youth Wing (Angkatan Muda Harapan) ===
- Youth Chief:
  - Woo Kah Leong (DAP)
- Deputy Youth Chief:
  - Mohd Hasbie Muda (AMANAH)
  - Kamil Munim (PKR)
  - Nurthaqaffah Nordin (AMANAH)
- Vice-Youth Chief:
  - Nik Abdul Razak Nik Md Ridzuan (AMANAH)
  - Young Syefura Othman (DAP)
  - Izuan Kasim (PKR)
- Youth Secretary:
  - Musaddeq Khalid (AMANAH)
- Deputy Youth Secretary:
  - Omar Mokhtar A Manap (PKR)
- Youth Treasurer:
  - Lim Yi Wei (DAP)
- Deputy Youth Treasurer:
  - Nur Najihah Muhaimin (AMANAH)
- Youth Communications Director:
  - Muhammad Haziq Azfar Ishak (PKR)
- Youth Public Policies Director:
  - Ong Chun Wei (DAP)
  - Nadia Fathin Syahira (PKR)
  - Ammar Atan (AMANAH)
- Youth Mobilization Director:
  - Umar Khair (PKR)
  - Abbas Azmi (AMANAH)
  - Jason Raj Kirupanantha (DAP)
- Youth Elections Director:
  - Asmaaliff Abdul Adam (AMANAH)
  - Prabakaran Parameswaran (PKR)
  - Keristinah Philip Selvaraju (DAP)

=== Women's Wing (Wanita Pakatan Harapan) ===
- Women's Chief:
  - Aiman Athirah Sabu (AMANAH)
- Deputy Women's Chief:
  - Fadhlina Sidek (PKR)
  - Teo Nie Ching (DAP)
- Vice-Women's Chief:
  - Anfaal Saari (AMANAH)
  - Yeo Bee Yin (DAP)
  - Juwairiya Zulkifli (PKR)
- Women's Secretary:
  - Mashitah Ismail (AMANAH)
- Deputy Women's Secretary:
  - Loh Ker Chean (PKR)
- Women's Treasurer:
  - Young Syefura Othman (DAP)
- Women's Information Chief:
  - Mariam Abdul Rashid (AMANAH)
- Women's Communications Director:
  - Syerleena Abdul Rashid (DAP)
- Sabah and Sarawak Committee Chief:
  - Vacant
- East Coast Committee Chief:
  - Faizah Ariffin (PKR)

== Leadership ==
=== Chairperson ===
No.	Name (Birth–Death)	Portrait	Term of office		Time in office	Political party
1	Mahathir Mohamad (b.1925)		14 July 2017	24 February 2020	2 years, 225 days	BERSATU
2	Anwar Ibrahim (b.1947)		14 May 2020	Incumbent	6 years, 189 days	PKR

=== President ===
No.	Name (Birth–Death)	Portrait	Term of office		Time in office	Political party
1	Wan Azizah Wan Ismail (b.1952)		14 July 2017	Incumbent	9 years, 128 days	PKR

=== Women's Chief ===
No.	Name (Birth–Death)	Portrait	Term of office		Time in office	Political party
1	Zuraida Kamaruddin (b.1958)		14 August 2017	24 February 2020	2 years, 194 days	PKR
2	Chong Eng (b. 1957)		18 March 2021	12 September 2021	178 days	DAP
3	Aiman Athirah Sabu (b.1972)		12 September 2021	Incumbent	5 years, 68 days	AMANAH

=== Youth Chief ===
No.	Name (Birth–Death)	Portrait	Term of office		Time in office	Political party
1	Nik Nazmi Nik Ahmad (b. 1982)		31 October 2017	13 December 2018	1 year, 43 days	PKR
2	Syed Saddiq (b. 1992)		13 December 2018	24 February 2020	1 year, 73 days	BERSATU
3	Shazni Munir Mohd Ithnin (1987–2021)		4 March 2021	6 August 2021	155 days	AMANAH
4	Howard Lee Chuan How (b. 1983)		12 September 2021	29 July 2022	320 days	DAP
5	Kelvin Yii Lee Wuen (b. 1986)		29 July 2022	11 March 2025	2 years, 225 days	DAP
6	Woo Kah Leong (b. 1991)		11 March 2025	Incumbent	1 year, 253 days	DAP

== Elected representatives ==
=== Dewan Negara (Senate) ===
==== Senators ====
- His Majesty's appointee:
  - Saifuddin Nasution Ismail (PKR)
  - Fuziah Salleh (PKR)
  - Saraswathy Kandasami (PKR)
  - Leong Ngah Ngah (DAP)
  - Niran Tan Kran (PKR)
  - Isaiah D Jacob (PKR)
  - Mohd Hasbie Muda (AMANAH)
  - Mohd Hatta Ramli (AMANAH)
  - Abun Sui Anyit (PKR)
  - Phoong Jin Zhe (DAP)
  - Sheikh Umar Bagharib Ali (DAP)
  - Larry Assap (DAP)
  - Thiagarajah Rajagopal (DAP)
- Negeri Sembilan State Legislative Assembly:
  - Vincent Wu Him Ven (DAP)
  - Jufitri Joha (PKR)
- Penang State Legislative Assembly:
  - Lingeshwaran Arunasalam (DAP)
  - Noor Inayah Yaakub (PKR)
- Selangor State Legislative Assembly:
  - Tiew Way Keng (DAP)
  - Mohammad Redzuan Othman (PKR)

=== Dewan Rakyat (House of Representatives) ===
==== Members of Parliament of the 15th Malaysian Parliament ====
Pakatan Harapan has 75 members in the House of Representatives.

State	No.	Parliament Constituency	Member	Party
Kedah	P015	Sungai Petani	Mohammed Taufiq Johari	PKR
Penang	P043	Bagan	Lim Guan Eng	DAP
Penang	P045	Bukit Mertajam	Steven Sim Chee Keong	DAP
Penang	P046	Batu Kawan	Chow Kon Yeow	DAP
Penang	P047	Nibong Tebal	Fadhlina Sidek	PKR
Penang	P048	Bukit Bendera	Syerleena Abdul Rashid	DAP
Penang	P049	Tanjong	Lim Hui Ying	DAP
Penang	P050	Jelutong	Sanisvara Nethaji Rayer Rajaji Rayer	DAP
Penang	P051	Bukit Gelugor	Ramkarpal Singh	DAP
Penang	P052	Bayan Baru	Sim Tze Tzin	PKR
Penang	P053	Balik Pulau	Muhammad Bakhtiar Wan Chik	PKR
Perak	P060	Taiping	Wong Kah Woh	DAP
Perak	P062	Sungai Siput	Kesavan Subramaniam	PKR
Perak	P063	Tambun	Anwar Ibrahim	PKR
Perak	P064	Ipoh Timor	Howard Lee Chuan How	DAP
Perak	P065	Ipoh Barat	Kulasegaran Murugeson	DAP
Perak	P066	Batu Gajah	Sivakumar Varatharaju Naidu	DAP
Perak	P068	Beruas	Ngeh Koo Ham	DAP
Perak	P070	Kampar	Chong Zhemin	DAP
Perak	P071	Gopeng	Tan Kar Hing	PKR
Perak	P076	Teluk Intan	Nga Kor Ming	DAP
Perak	P077	Tanjong Malim	Chang Lih Kang	PKR
Pahang	P080	Raub	Chow Yu Hui	DAP
Pahang	P089	Bentong	Young Syefura Othman	DAP
Selangor	P096	Kuala Selangor	Dzulkefly Ahmad	AMANAH
Selangor	P097	Selayang	William Leong Jee Keen	PKR
Selangor	P098	Gombak	Amirudin Shari	PKR
Selangor	P099	Ampang	~~Rodziah Ismail~~	PKR
Selangor	P101	Hulu Langat	Mohd Sany Hamzan	AMANAH
Selangor	P102	Bangi	Syahredzan Johan	DAP
Selangor	P103	Puchong	Yeo Bee Yin	DAP
Selangor	P106	Damansara	Gobind Singh Deo	DAP
Selangor	P107	Sungai Buloh	Ramanan Ramakrishnan	PKR
Selangor	P108	Shah Alam	Azli Yusof	AMANAH
Selangor	P110	Klang	Ganabatirau Veraman	DAP
Selangor	P111	Kota Raja	Mohamad Sabu	AMANAH
Selangor	P113	Sepang	Aiman Athirah Sabu	AMANAH
Kuala Lumpur	P114	Kepong	Lim Lip Eng	DAP
Kuala Lumpur	P115	Batu	Prabakaran Parameswaran	PKR
Kuala Lumpur	P116	Wangsa Maju	Zahir Hassan	PKR
Kuala Lumpur	P117	Segambut	Hannah Yeoh Tseow Suan	DAP
Kuala Lumpur	P120	Bukit Bintang	Fong Kui Lun	DAP
Kuala Lumpur	P121	Lembah Pantai	Fahmi Fadzil	PKR
Kuala Lumpur	P122	Seputeh	Teresa Kok Suh Sim	DAP
Kuala Lumpur	P123	Cheras	Tan Kok Wai	DAP
Kuala Lumpur	P124	Bandar Tun Razak	Wan Azizah Wan Ismail	PKR
Negeri Sembilan	P128	Seremban	Anthony Loke Siew Fook	DAP
Negeri Sembilan	P130	Rasah	Cha Kee Chin	DAP
Negeri Sembilan	P132	Port Dickson	Aminuddin Harun	PKR
Malacca	P135	Alor Gajah	Adly Zahari	AMANAH
Malacca	P137	Hang Tuah Jaya	Adam Adli Abdul Halim	PKR
Malacca	P138	Kota Melaka	Khoo Poay Tiong	DAP
Johor	P140	Segamat	Yuneswaran Ramaraj	PKR
Johor	P141	Sekijang	Zaliha Mustafa	PKR
Johor	P142	Labis	Pang Hok Liong	DAP
Johor	P144	Ledang	Syed Ibrahim Syed Noh	PKR
Johor	P145	Bakri	Tan Hong Pin	DAP
Johor	P149	Sri Gading	Aminolhuda Hassan	AMANAH
Johor	P150	Batu Pahat	Onn Abu Bakar	PKR
Johor	P152	Kluang	Wong Shu Qi	DAP
Johor	P158	Tebrau	Jimmy Puah Wee Tse	PKR
Johor	P159	Pasir Gudang	Hassan Abdul Karim	PKR
Johor	P160	Johor Bahru	Akmal Nasrullah Mohd Nasir	PKR
Johor	P161	Pulai	Suhaizan Kayat	AMANAH
Johor	P162	Iskandar Puteri	Liew Chin Tong	DAP
Johor	P163	Kulai	Teo Nie Ching	DAP
Sabah	P171	Sepanggar	Mustapha Sakmud	PKR
Sabah	P172	Kota Kinabalu	Chan Foong Hin	DAP
Sabah	P186	Sandakan	Vivian Wong Shir Yee	DAP
Sarawak	P192	Mas Gading	Mordi Bimol	DAP
Sarawak	P195	Bandar Kuching	Kelvin Yii Lee Wuen	DAP
Sarawak	P196	Stampin	Chong Chieng Jen	DAP
Sarawak	P211	Lanang	Alice Lau Kiong Yieng	DAP
Sarawak	P212	Sibu	Oscar Ling Chai Yew	DAP
Sarawak	P219	Miri	Chiew Choon Man	PKR
Total	Kedah (1), Penang (10), Perak (11), Pahang (2), Selangor (13), F.T. Kuala Lumpur (9), Negeri Sembilan (3), Malacca (3), Johor (14), Sabah (3), Sarawak (6)			

=== Dewan Undangan Negeri (State Legislative Assembly) ===
Penang State Legislative Assembly
27 / 40
Selangor State Legislative Assembly
32 / 56
Perak State Legislative Assembly
24 / 59
Negeri Sembilan State Legislative Assembly
11 / 36
Pahang State Legislative Assembly
10 / 47
Malacca State Legislative Assembly
4 / 28
Johor State Legislative Assembly
8 / 56
Kedah State Legislative Assembly
3 / 36
Perlis State Legislative Assembly
1 / 15
Sabah State Legislative Assembly
2 / 79
Sarawak State Legislative Assembly
2 / 82
Kelantan State Legislative Assembly
1 / 45
Terengganu State Legislative Assembly
0 / 33

State	No.	Parliamentary constituency	No.	State Constituency	Member	Party
Perlis	P002	Kangar	N08	Indera Kayangan	Gan Ay Ling	PKR
Kedah	P009	Alor Setar	N13	Kota Darul Aman	Teh Swee Leong	DAP
Kedah	P015	Sungai Petani	N28	Bakar Arang	Adam Loh Wei Chai	PKR
Kedah	P015	Sungai Petani	N29	Sidam	Bau Wong Bau Ek	PKR
Kelantan	P021	Kota Bharu	N09	Kota Lama	Hafidzah Mustakim	AMANAH
Penang	P043	Bagan	N07	Sungai Puyu	Phee Syn Tze	DAP
Penang	P043	Bagan	N08	Bagan Jermal	Chee Yeeh Keen	DAP
Penang	P043	Bagan	N09	Bagan Dalam	Kumaran Krishnan	DAP
Penang	P045	Bukit Mertajam	N13	Berapit	Heng Lee Lee	DAP
Penang	P045	Bukit Mertajam	N14	Machang Bubok	Lee Khai Loon	PKR
Penang	P045	Bukit Mertajam	N15	Padang Lalang	Daniel Gooi Zi Sen	DAP
Penang	P046	Batu Kawan	N16	Perai	Sundarajoo Somu	DAP
Penang	P046	Batu Kawan	N17	Bukit Tengah	Gooi Hsiao Leung	PKR
Penang	P046	Batu Kawan	N18	Bukit Tambun	Goh Choon Aik	PKR
Penang	P047	Nibong Tebal	N19	Jawi	Jason H'ng Mooi Lye	DAP
Penang	P048	Bukit Bendera	N22	Tanjong Bunga	Zairil Khir Johari	DAP
Penang	P048	Bukit Bendera	N23	Air Putih	Lim Guan Eng	DAP
Penang	P048	Bukit Bendera	N24	Kebun Bunga	Lee Boon Heng	PKR
Penang	P048	Bukit Bendera	N25	Pulau Tikus	Joshua Woo Sze Zeng	DAP
Penang	P049	Tanjong	N26	Padang Kota	Chow Kon Yeow	DAP
Penang	P049	Tanjong	N27	Pengkalan Kota	Wong Yuee Harng	DAP
Penang	P049	Tanjong	N28	Komtar	Teh Lai Heng	DAP
Penang	P050	Jelutong	N29	Datok Keramat	Jagdeep Singh Deo	DAP
Penang	P050	Jelutong	N30	Sungai Pinang	Lim Siew Khim	DAP
Penang	P050	Jelutong	N31	Batu Lancang	Ong Ah Teong	DAP
Penang	P051	Bukit Gelugor	N32	Seri Delima	Connie Tan Hooi Peng	DAP
Penang	P051	Bukit Gelugor	N33	Air Itam	Joseph Ng Soon Siang	DAP
Penang	P051	Bukit Gelugor	N34	Paya Terubong	Wong Hon Wai	DAP
Penang	P052	Bayan Baru	N35	Batu Uban	Kumaresan Aramugam	PKR
Penang	P052	Bayan Baru	N36	Pantai Jerejak	Fahmi Zainol	PKR
Penang	P052	Bayan Baru	N37	Batu Maung	Mohamad Abdul Hamid	PKR
Penang	P053	Balik Pulau	N38	Bayan Lepas	Azrul Mahathir Aziz	AMANAH
Perak	P060	Taiping	N17	Pokok Assam	Ong Seng Guan	DAP
Perak	P060	Taiping	N18	Aulong	Teh Kok Lim	DAP
Perak	P062	Sungai Siput	N22	Jalong	Loh Sze Yee	DAP
Perak	P063	Tambun	N24	Hulu Kinta	Muhamad Arafat Varisai Mahamad	PKR
Perak	P064	Ipoh Timur	N25	Canning	Jenny Choy Tsi Jen	DAP
Perak	P064	Ipoh Timur	N26	Tebing Tinggi	Abdul Aziz Bari	DAP
Perak	P064	Ipoh Timur	N27	Pasir Pinji	Goh See Hua	DAP
Perak	P065	Ipoh Barat	N28	Bercham	Ong Boon Piow	DAP
Perak	P065	Ipoh Barat	N29	Kepayang	Nga Kor Ming	DAP
Perak	P065	Ipoh Barat	N30	Buntong	Thulsi Thivani Manogaran	DAP
Perak	P066	Batu Gajah	N31	Jelapang	Cheah Pou Hian	DAP
Perak	P066	Batu Gajah	N32	Menglembu	Chaw Kam Foon	DAP
Perak	P066	Batu Gajah	N33	Tronoh	Steven Tiw Tee Siang	DAP
Perak	P068	Beruas	N37	Pantai Remis	Wong May Ing	DAP
Perak	P068	Beruas	N38	Astaka	Jason Ng Thien Yeong	DAP
Perak	P070	Kampar	N41	Malim Nawar	Bavani Veraiah	DAP
Perak	P070	Kampar	N42	Keranji	Angeline Koo Haai Yen	DAP
Perak	P070	Kampar	N43	Tualang Sekah	Mohd Azlan Helmi	PKR
Perak	P071	Gopeng	N44	Sungai Rapat	Mohammad Nizar Jamaluddin	AMANAH
Perak	P071	Gopeng	N45	Simpang Pulai	Wong Chai Yi	PKR
Perak	P071	Gopeng	N46	Teja	Sandrea Ng Shy Ching	PKR
Perak	P075	Bagan Datuk	N54	Hutan Melintang	Wasanthee Sinnasamy	PKR
Perak	P076	Teluk Intan	N55	Pasir Bedamar	Woo Kah Leong	DAP
Perak	P077	Tanjong Malim	N57	Sungkai	Sivanesan Achalingam	DAP
Pahang	P078	Cameron Highlands	N1	Tanah Rata	Ho Chi Yang	DAP
Pahang	P080	Raub	N07	Tras	Tengku Zulpuri Shah Raja Puji	DAP
Pahang	P082	Indera Mahkota	N13	Semambu	Chan Chun Kuang	PKR
Pahang	P083	Kuantan	N14	Teruntum	Sim Chon Siang	PKR
Pahang	P088	Temerloh	N30	Mentakab	Woo Chee Wan	DAP
Pahang	P089	Bentong	N33	Bilut	Lee Chin Chen	DAP
Pahang	P089	Bentong	N34	Ketari	Thomas Su Keong Siong	DAP
Pahang	P090	Bera	N38	Triang	Leong Yu Man	DAP
Pahang	—			Nominated member	Rizal Jamin	PKR
Pahang	—			Nominated member	Mohd Fadzli Mohd Ramly	AMANAH
Selangor	P093	Sungai Besar	N04	Sekinchan	Ng Suee Lim	DAP
Selangor	P094	Hulu Selangor	N06	Kuala Kubu Baharu	Pang Sock Tao	DAP
Selangor	P097	Selayang	N14	Rawang	Chua Wei Kiat	PKR
Selangor	P097	Selayang	N15	Taman Templer	Anfaal Saari	AMANAH
Selangor	P098	Gombak	N16	Sungai Tua	Amirudin Shari	PKR
Selangor	P099	Ampang	N19	Bukit Antarabangsa	Mohd Kamri Kamaruddin	PKR
Selangor	P099	Ampang	N20	Lembah Jaya	Syed Ahmad Syed Abdul Rahman Alhadad	PKR
Selangor	P100	Pandan	N21	Pandan Indah	Izham Hashim	AMANAH
Selangor	P100	Pandan	N22	Teratai	Yew Jia Haur	DAP
Selangor	P102	Bangi	N25	Kajang	David Cheong Kian Young	PKR
Selangor	P102	Bangi	N27	Balakong	Wayne Ong Chun Wei	DAP
Selangor	P103	Puchong	N28	Seri Kembangan	Wong Siew Ki	DAP
Selangor	P103	Puchong	N29	Seri Serdang	Abbas Azmi	AMANAH
Selangor	P104	Subang	N30	Kinrara	Ng Sze Han	DAP
Selangor	P104	Subang	N31	Subang Jaya	Michelle Ng Mei Sze	DAP
Selangor	P105	Petaling Jaya	N32	Seri Setia	Mohammad Fahmi Ngah	PKR
Selangor	P105	Petaling Jaya	N34	Bukit Gasing	Rajiv Rishyakaran	DAP
Selangor	P106	Damansara	N35	Kampung Tunku	Lim Yi Wei	DAP
Selangor	P106	Damansara	N36	Bandar Utama	Jamaliah Jamaluddin	DAP
Selangor	P106	Damansara	N37	Bukit Lanjan	Pua Pei Ling	PKR
Selangor	P107	Sungai Buloh	N39	Kota Damansara	Muhammad Izuan Ahmad Kasim	PKR
Selangor	P108	Shah Alam	N40	Kota Anggerik	Najwan Halimi	PKR
Selangor	P108	Shah Alam	N41	Batu Tiga	Danial Al Rashid Haron	AMANAH
Selangor	P109	Kapar	N42	Meru	Mariam Abdul Rashid	AMANAH
Selangor	P110	Klang	N45	Bandar Baru Klang	Quah Perng Fei	DAP
Selangor	P110	Klang	N46	Pelabuhan Klang	Azmizam Zaman Huri	PKR
Selangor	P110	Klang	N47	Pandamaran	Leong Tuck Chee	DAP
Selangor	P111	Kota Raja	N48	Sentosa	Gunarajah George	PKR
Selangor	P111	Kota Raja	N50	Kota Kemuning	Preakas Sampunathan	DAP
Selangor	P112	Kuala Langat	N52	Banting	Papparaidu Veraman	DAP
Selangor	P113	Sepang	N54	Tanjong Sepat	Borhan Aman Shah	PKR
Selangor	P113	Sepang	N56	Sungai Pelek	Lwi Kian Keong	DAP
Negeri Sembilan	P127	Jempol	N08	Bahau	Teo Kok Seong	DAP
Negeri Sembilan	P128	Seremban	N10	Nilai	Arul Kumar Jambunathan	DAP
Negeri Sembilan	P128	Seremban	N11	Lobak	Chew Seh Yong	DAP
Negeri Sembilan	P128	Seremban	N12	Temiang	Ho Weng Wah	DAP
Negeri Sembilan	P130	Rasah	N21	Bukit Kepayang	Nicole Tan Lee Koon	DAP
Negeri Sembilan	P130	Rasah	N22	Rahang	Desmond Siau Meow Kong	DAP
Negeri Sembilan	P130	Rasah	N23	Mambau	Lee Kai Yet	DAP
Negeri Sembilan	P130	Rasah	N24	Seremban Jaya	Mugunthan Subramanian	DAP
Negeri Sembilan	P132	Port Dickson	N29	Chuah	Yew Boon Lye	PKR
Negeri Sembilan	P132	Port Dickson	N30	Lukut	Choo Ken Hwa	DAP
Negeri Sembilan	P132	Port Dickson	N33	Sri Tanjung	Rajasekaran Gunnasekaran	PKR
Malacca	P137	Hang Tuah Jaya	N16	Ayer Keroh	Kerk Chee Yee	DAP
Malacca	P138	Kota Melaka	N19	Kesidang	Allex Seah Shoo Chin	DAP
Malacca	P138	Kota Melaka	N20	Kota Laksamana	Low Chee Leong	DAP
Malacca	P138	Kota Melaka	N22	Bandar Hilir	Leng Chau Yen	DAP
Johor	P145	Bakri	N12	Bentayan	Ng Yak Howe	DAP
Johor	P145	Bakri	N13	Simpang Jeram	Nazri Abdul Rahman	AMANAH
Johor	P150	Batu Pahat	N23	Penggaram	Felicia Poh Rui Ling	DAP
Johor	P152	Kluang	N28	Mengkibol	Chu Poh Yee	DAP
Johor	P158	Tebrau	N41	Puteri Wangsa	Maszlee Malik	PKR
Johor	P160	Johor Bahru	N45	Stulang	Andrew Chen Kah Eng	DAP
Johor	P162	Iskandar Puteri	N48	Skudai	Kartiyaini Jeyapalan	DAP
Johor	P163	Kulai	N52	Senai	Wong Bor Yang	DAP
Sabah	P181	Tenom	N42	Melalap	Jamawi Ja'afar	PKR
Sabah	—			Nominated member	Grace Lee Li Mei	PKR
Sarawak	P195	Bandar Kuching	N09	Padungan	Chong Chieng Jen	DAP
Sarawak	P195	Bandar Kuching	N10	Pending	Violet Yong Wui Wui	DAP
Total	Perlis (1), Kedah (3), Kelantan (1), Penang (27), Perak (24), Pahang (10), Selangor (32), Negeri Sembilan (11), Malacca (4), Johor (8), Sabah (2), Sarawak (2)					

== Government offices ==
=== Ministerial posts ===
Portfolio	Office Bearer	Party	Constituency
Prime Minister Minister of Finance	Dato' Seri Anwar Ibrahim MP	PKR	Tambun
Minister of Transport	Loke Siew Fook MP	DAP	Seremban
Minister of Agriculture and Food Security	Datuk Seri Mohamad Sabu MP	AMANAH	Kota Raja
Minister of Housing and Local Government	Nga Kor Ming MP	DAP	Teluk Intan
Minister of Home Affairs	Senator Datuk Seri Saifuddin Nasution Ismail	PKR	Senator
Minister of Science, Technology and Innovation	Datuk Chang Lih Kang MP	PKR	Tanjong Malim
Minister of Communications	Dato' Ahmad Fahmi Mohamed Fadzil MP	PKR	Lembah Pantai
Minister of Education	Fadhlina Sidek MP	PKR	Nibong Tebal
Minister in the Prime Minister's Department (Federal Territories)	Hannah Yeoh Tseow Suan MP	DAP	Segambut
Minister of Digital	Gobind Singh Deo MP	DAP	Damansara
Minister of Health	Datuk Seri Dr. Dzulkefly Ahmad MP	AMANAH	Kuala Selangor
Minister of Entrepreneur and Cooperative Development	Steven Sim Chee Keong MP	DAP	Bukit Mertajam
Minister of Human Resources	Dato' Sri Ramanan Ramakrishnan MP	PKR	Sungai Buloh
Minister of Economy	Akmal Nasrullah Mohd Nasir MP	PKR	Johor Bahru
Minister in the Prime Minister's Department (Sabah and Sarawak Affairs)	Datuk Ts. Mustapha Sakmud MP	PKR	Sepanggar
Minister of Youth and Sports	Dr. Mohammed Taufiq Johari MP	PKR	Sungai Petani

Portfolio	Office Bearer	Party	Constituency
Deputy Minister of Agriculture and Food Security	Datuk Chan Foong Hin MP	DAP	Kota Kinabalu
Deputy Minister of Defence	Adly Zahari MP MLA	AMANAH	Alor Gajah
Deputy Minister of Finance	Liew Chin Tong MP	DAP	Iskandar Puteri
Deputy Minister of Housing and Local Government	Datuk Aiman Athirah Sabu MP	AMANAH	Sepang
Deputy Minister of Domestic Trade and Costs of Living	Senator Fuziah Salleh	PKR	Senator
Deputy Minister of Communications	Teo Nie Ching MP	DAP	Kulai
Deputy Minister of Women, Family and Community Development	Lim Hui Ying MP	DAP	Tanjong
Deputy Minister of Higher Education	Adam Adli Abdul Halim MP	PKR	Hang Tuah Jaya
Deputy Minister in the Prime Minister's Department (Law and Institutional Reform)	Kulasegaran Murugeson MP	DAP	Ipoh Barat
Deputy Minister of Education	Wong Kah Woh MP	DAP	Taiping
Deputy Minister of Investment, Trade and Industry	Sim Tze Tzin MP	PKR	Bayan Baru
Deputy Minister of National Unity	Yuneswaran Ramaraj MP	PKR	Segamat
Deputy Minister of Natural Resources and Environmental Sustainability	Syed Ibrahim Syed Noh MP	PKR	Ledang
Deputy Minister of Youth and Sports	Mordi Bimol MP	DAP	Mas Gading
Deputy Minister of Tourism, Arts and Culture	Chiew Choon Man MP	PKR	Miri

=== State governments ===
Pakatan Harapan (as of June 2026) forms the state governments of Pahang and Perak in coalition with Barisan Nasional, and the state government of Sabah in coalition with Gabungan Rakyat Sabah, following the formation of the federal unity government (Kerajaan Perpaduan) in the aftermath of the 15th general election of November 2022. Pakatan Harapan, while leading the majority government in Penang and Selangor, has Barisan Nasional participation in the state exco since the 2023 state elections.

- Selangor (2015–present)
- Penang (2015–present)
- Negeri Sembilan (2018–2026)
- Perak (2018–2020, 2022–present)
- Malacca (2018–2020, 2022–2026)
- Pahang (2022–present)
- Sabah (2018–2020, 2022–present)
- Kedah (2018–2020, 2020)
- Johor (2018–2020, 2022–2026)

Note: bold as Menteri Besar/Chief Minister, italic as junior partner

State	Leader type	Member	Party	State Constituency
Penang	Chief Minister	Chow Kon Yeow	DAP	Padang Kota
Selangor	Menteri Besar	Amirudin Shari	PKR	Sungai Tua

State	Leader type	Member	Party	State Constituency
Penang	Deputy Chief Minister I	Mohamad Abdul Hamid	PKR	Batu Maung
Penang	Deputy Chief Minister II	Jagdeep Singh Deo	DAP	Datok Keramat

=== Legislative leadership ===
Portfolio	Office Bearer	Party	Constituency
Speaker of the Dewan Rakyat	Tan Sri Dato' Johari Abdul	PKR	Non-MP
Deputy Speaker of the Dewan Rakyat	Alice Lau Kiong Yeng MP	DAP	Lanang

State	Leader type	Member	Party	State Constituency
Malacca	Deputy Speaker	Kerk Chee Yee	DAP	Ayer Keroh
Pahang	Deputy Speaker	Lee Chin Chen	DAP	Bilut
Penang	Speaker	Law Choo Kiang	PKR	Non-MLA
Penang	Deputy Speaker	Azrul Mahathir Aziz	AMANAH	Bayan Lepas
Perak	Deputy Speaker	Jenny Choy Tsi Jen	DAP	Canning
Selangor	Speaker	Lau Weng San	DAP	Non-MLA
Selangor	Deputy Speaker	Mohd Kamri Kamaruddin	PKR	Bukit Antarabangsa

=== Official opposition ===
State	Leader type	Member	Party	State Constituency
Johor	Balancing Force Leader	Andrew Chen Kah Eng	DAP	Stulang
Kedah	Opposition Leader	Bau Wong Bau Ek	PKR	Sidam
Negeri Sembilan	Opposition Leader	Arul Kumar Jambunathan	DAP	Nilai
Perlis	Opposition Leader	Gan Ay Ling	PKR	Indera Kayangan
Sarawak	Opposition Leader	Chong Chieng Jen	DAP	Padungan

== Election results ==
=== General election results ===
Election	Total seats won	Seats contested	Total votes	Voting Percentage	Outcome of election	Election leader
2018	122 / 222	222	5,615,822	45.56%	▲53 seats; **Governing coalition** (2018–2020) later **Opposition coalition** (2020–2022)	Mahathir Mohamad
2022	82 / 222	220	5,801,327	37.46%	▼40 seats; **Governing coalition** with Barisan Nasional, Gabungan Parti Sarawak, Gabungan Rakyat Sabah and Parti Warisan	Anwar Ibrahim

=== State election results ===
State assembly	Election	Votes	%	Seats	Won/contested	+/–	Position	Status
Perlis	2022	27,856	18.8	1 / 15	1 / 15	▼2	2nd	Opposition
Kedah	2023	233,654	20.1	3 / 36	3 / 21	▼15	▼2nd	Opposition
Kelantan	2023	81,546	9.6	1 / 45	1 / 14	▲1	3rd	Opposition
Terengganu	2023	19,216	2.8	0 / 32	0 / 5	Steady	3rd	No seats
Penang	2023	542,133	60.9	27 / 40	27 / 34	▼10	1st	PH–BN
Perak	2022	632,885	42.7	24 / 59	24 / 59	▼5	▼2nd	BN–PH
Pahang	2022	188,241	21.7	8 / 42	8 / 41	▼1	▼3rd	BN–PH
Selangor	2023	1,375,902	51.4	32 / 56	32 / 44	▼19	1st	PH–BN
Negeri Sembilan	2026	256,386	40.2	11 / 36	11 / 36	▼6	▼2nd	Opposition
Malacca	2026	143,273	29.3	4 / 28	4 / 24	▼1	2nd	Opposition
Johor	2026	611,983	32.6	8 / 56	8 / 56	▼4	2nd	Balancing force
Sabah	2025	75,938	6.7	1 / 73	1 / 22	▼7	▼6th	GRS–PH–BN
Sarawak	2021	78,197	10.5	2 / 82	2 / 62	▼8	▼3rd	Opposition

Year	(Malaysia) DR	(Sabah) Sbh	(Sarawak) Swk	(Perlis) Pls	(Kedah) Kdh	(Kelantan) Ktn	(Terengganu) Tgu	(Penang) Png	(Perak) Prk	(Pahang) Phg	(Selangor) Sgr	(Negeri Sembilan) NS	(Malacca) Mlk	(Johor) Jhr
2015														
2016			**10/82**											
2017			**10/82**											
2018	**113/222**	**8/60**	**10/82**	**3/15**	**18/36**	0/45	0/32	**37/40**	**29/59**	**9/42**	**51/56**	**20/36**	**15/28**	**36/56**
2019			**10/82**	**3/15**		0/45	0/32			**9/42**				
2020		▼9/73	**10/82**	**3/15**			0/32			**9/42**				
2021		▼9/73	▼2/82	**3/15**			0/32			**9/42**			▼5/28	
2022	▼82/222		▼2/82	▼1/15			0/32		▼24/59	▼8/42			▼5/28	▼12/56
2023			▼2/82	▼1/15	▼3/36	▲**1/45**	0/32	▼27/40			▼32/56	▼17/36		▼12/56
2024			▼2/82	▼1/15	▼3/36	▲**1/45**	0/32							▼12/56
2025		▼1/73	▼2/82	▼1/15	▼3/36	▲**1/45**	0/32							▼12/56
2026			TBD	▼1/15	▼3/36	▲**1/45**	0/32					▼11/36	▼4/28	▼8/56
Year	(Malaysia) DR	(Sabah) Sbh	(Sarawak) Swk	(Perlis) Pls	(Kedah) Kdh	(Kelantan) Ktn	(Terengganu) Tgu	(Penang) Png	(Perak) Prk	(Pahang) Phg	(Selangor) Sgr	(Negeri Sembilan) NS	(Malacca) Mlk	(Johor) Jhr
**Bold** indicates best result to date. Present in legislature (in opposition) Coalition partner

== See also ==
- Politics of Malaysia
- List of political parties in Malaysia
