= Informatics Education =

Public IT institute in Singapore

Informatics Education Ltd.
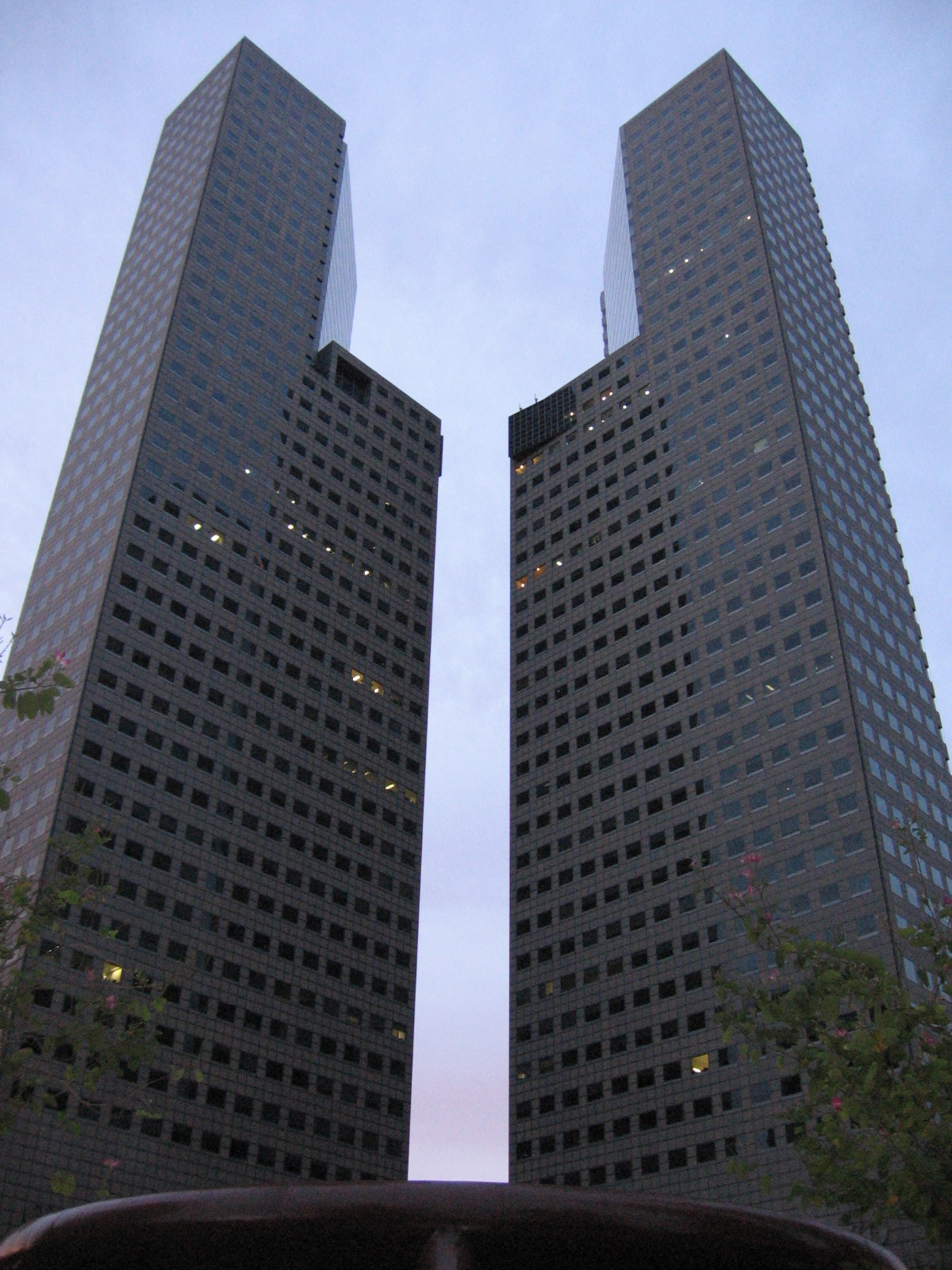
- Informatics headquarters located at Suntec Tower One, Singapore
- Type: Public
- Traded as: SGX: BOU
- ISIN: SG1CE8000006
- Industry: Education
- Founded: July 20, 1983; 43 years ago in Singapore
- Headquarters: 7 Temasek Boulevard, #12-07 Suntec Tower One, Singapore 038987., Singapore
- Area served: Singapore; China; Hong Kong; United Kingdom; Malaysia; Philippines; Sri Lanka
- Key people: Dato’ Sri Robin Tan Yeong CHING (non-executive chairman ); Yau Su Peng (executive director)
- Revenue: ▼SGD $6.5 Million (2022)
- Operating income: ▼SGD $0.013 Million (2022)
- Net income: ▼SGD $(0.013) Million (2022)
- Total assets: ▼SGD $2.74 Million (2022)
- Total equity: ▼SGD $(1.54) Million (2022)
- Number of employees: ▲128 (2021); 114 (2020)
- Website: www.informaticseducation.com

Informatics Education or Informatics Group (also called Informatics International College, Informatics College, Informatics Institute, or simply Informatics) is an educational institution that caters mainly to students who wants to study Information Technology (IT) related courses. Informatics is also engaged as a franchisee and licensee for both computer and commercial training centers. It also facilitates examination, and operates through higher education and corporate training segments.

== History ==
Informatics was founded in 1983 with the name Bitec Computer Centre Pte Ltd. It commenced operations on August 15, 1983 using the business name Informatics Computer School. On December 13, 1988, the company changed its name to Informatics Holdings Pte Ltd. and to its present name when it was converted to a public limited company on March 19, 1993. It was listed in Singapore Stock Exchange (SGX) mainboard. Informatics also have affiliations with educational institution in various countries.

In 1998, Informatics Holdings Ltd. acquired an IT training and education specialist in the United Kingdom through a joint venture.

In May 2004, the company experienced a 70% fall in stock price when it was known that they were taking annual net loss. By June 2004, they have issued shares to an investment unit of Indonesian born tycoon Oei Hong Leong. In July 2004, Informatics made a new one-for-four rights issue deal at 25 cents per share to raise $19.6 million.

=== Stock Trading Suspension ===
On July 28, 2022, Informatics Education Ltd. (IEL) has been suspended for public trading in Singapore Stock Exchange (SGX) mainboard. It was placed on the watchlist pursuant to Rule 1311(2) (minimum trading price entry criteria) and Rule 1311(1) (financial entry criteria) of the exchange’s listing manual in 2017. The company will remain suspended until the completion of the exit offer to its shareholders, following which it will be delisted.

After the trading suspension, in October 2022,Berjaya Corporation subsidiary Berjaya Land Bhd. through its wholly owned subsidiary, Berjaya Leisure Capital (Cayman) Ltd. (BLCC), intended to make an offer for Informatics Education Ltd. (IEL) shares in connection with the directed delisting of IEL from the Singapore Exchange. BLCC, which owns 119.56 million shares or a 67.4% stake in IEL, plans to offer $0.011 in cash for each of the remaining IEL shares, said Berjaya Land in a filing. Furthermore, BLCC also made an offer to acquire the remaining warrants of IEL at $0.0001 per warrant.

== Corporate affairs ==
=== Leadership ===
==== Board of directors ====
As of 2021, the board of directors of Informatics Education includes:

- Dato’ Sri Robin Tan Yeong Ching (Non-Executive Chairman)
- Yau Su Peng (Executive Director)
- Yeap Beng Swee Philip (Independent Director)
- Professor Lai Kim Fatt (Executive Director)

== Subsidiaries ==
Informatics Education lists of country of operations and or branches, affiliation, and subsidiaries:

Corporate name	Place of incorporation	Principal activities	Functional currency	Percentage of ownership
Informatics Academy Pte Ltd	Singapore	Computer and business education and training, business management consultancy and child development	SGD	100%
Informatics International Pte Ltd	Singapore	Dormant	SGD	100%
Informatics Global Campus Pte Ltd	Singapore	Dormant	SGD	100%
Informatics Computer Education Sdn Bhd	Malaysia	Dormant	MYR	100%
Singapore Informatics Computer Institute (Pvt) Ltd	Sri Lanka	Doramnt	LKR	100%
Informatics Education (HK) Ltd	Hong Kong	Computer education and training	HKD	100%
Informatics Education UK Ltd	United Kingdom	Investment Holding	GBP	100%
NCC Education Limited	United Kingdom	Educational and business management consultancy	GBP	51%
NCC Education Limited (Held by the subsidiaries)	United Kingdom	Educational and business management consultancy	GBP	49%
NCC Education (M) Sdn Bhd (Held by the subsidiaries)	Malaysia	Marketing and consultancy	MYR	100%
NCC Education (Beijing) Consulting Co., Ltd (Held by the subsidiaries)	People's Republic of China	Consultancy	CNY	100%

=== Affiliation in Philippines ===
- Informatics Holdings Phils. Inc. (Informatics Philippines) - is an independently owned and operated local educational institution.

== Finances ==
For the fiscal (and calendar) year 2022, Informatics Education reported a net income and or loss of SGD $(0.013). The annual revenue was SGD $6.5 million. Below is the lists of revenue, net income, loss and total assets up to the current year period.

Year	Revenue (mil. SGD)	Net income / loss (mil. & thou. SGD)	Total assets (mil. SGD)
2020	10.9	0.019	2.86
2021	7.2	0.020	3.67
2022	6.5	(0.013)	2.74
