= Goh See Hua =

Malaysian politician

Yang Berhormat Tuan Goh See Hua MLA
- 吴锡华

State Assistant Organising Secretary of the Democratic Action Party of Perak
- Incumbent
- Assumed office 8 September 2024 Serving with Steven Chaw Kam Foon
- Secretary-General: Anthony Loke Siew Fook
- State Chairman: Nga Kor Ming
- State Organising Secretary: Teh Kok Lim
- Preceded by: Sivasubramaniam Athinarayanan

Member of the Perak State Legislative Assembly for Pasir Pinji
- Incumbent
- Assumed office 19 November 2022
- Preceded by: Howard Lee Chuan How (PH–DAP)
- Majority: 22,169 (2022)

Personal details
- Born: Goh See Hua; 17 September 1989 (age 37) Perak, Malaysia
- Citizenship: Malaysian
- Party: Democratic Action Party (DAP) (since 2012)
- Other political affiliations: Pakatan Rakyat (PR) (2012–2015); Pakatan Harapan (PH) (since 2015)
- Education: Universiti Tunku Abdul Rahman (UTAR) (Psychology)
- Occupation: Politician

Goh See Hua

Chinese name
- Traditional Chinese: 吳錫華
- Simplified Chinese: 吴锡华
Transcriptions
Standard Mandarin
- Hanyu Pinyin: Wú Xīhuá

Goh See Hua (simplified Chinese: 吴锡华; traditional Chinese: 吳錫華; pinyin: Wú Xīhuá; born 17 September 1989) is a Malaysian politician who has served as Member of the Perak State Legislative Assembly (MLA) for Pasir Pinji since November 2022. He is a member of the Democratic Action Party (DAP), a component party of the Pakatan Harapan (PH) and formerly Pakatan Rakyat (PR) coalitions. He has served as the State Assistant Organising Secretary of DAP of Perak since September 2024. He was Political Secretary to the MLA for Jalong Loh Sze Yee from 2018 to 2022, Member of Parliament (MP) for Kampar Ko Chung Sen from 2013 to 2018, Member of the Kuala Kangsar Municipal Council (MPKK) from 2018 to 2020 and Village Development Officer (PKP) of Sungai Siput in 2020.

== Member of the Perak State Legislative Assembly (since 2022) ==
In the 2022 Perak state election, Goh made his electoral debut after being nominated by PH to contest the Pasir Pinji state seat. Goh won the seat and was elected to the Perak State Legislative Assembly as the Pasir Pinji MLA after defeating Soo Poh Yeow of Barisan Nasional (BN) and Lam Kin Yip of Perikatan Nasional (PN) by a majority of 22,169 votes in a landslide victory.

== Election results ==
Perak State Legislative Assembly
Year	Constituency	Candidate	Votes	Pct	Opponent(s)	Votes	Pct	Ballots cast	Majority	Turnout
2022	N27 Pasir Pinji	Goh See Hua (DAP)	23,692	90.47%	Soo Poh Yeow (MCA)	1,523	5.82%	26,188	22,169	65.58%
2022	N27 Pasir Pinji	Goh See Hua (DAP)	23,692	90.47%	Lam Kin Yip (GERAKAN)	973	3.72%	26,188	22,169	65.58%
