= Jenny Choy Tsi Jen =

Malaysian politician

Yang Berhormat Puan Jenny Choy Tsi Jen MLA
- 崔慈恩

Deputy Speaker of the Perak State Legislative Assembly
- Incumbent
- Assumed office 19 December 2022
- Monarch: Nazrin Shah
- Menteri Besar: Saarani Mohamad
- Speaker: Mohamad Zahir Abdul Khalid
- Preceded by: Khalil Yahaya
- Constituency: Canning

Member of the Perak State Legislative Assembly for Canning
- Incumbent
- Assumed office 9 May 2018
- Preceded by: Wong Kah Woh (PR–DAP)
- Majority: 18,292 (2018); 20,734 (2022)

Personal details
- Born: Jenny Choy Tsi Jen; 1 January 1988 (age 38) Malaysia
- Citizenship: Malaysian
- Party: Democratic Action Party (DAP) (since 2008)
- Other political affiliations: Pakatan Rakyat (PR) (2008–2015); Pakatan Harapan (PH) (since 2015)
- Education: Sunway University
- Occupation: Politician

Jenny Choy Tsi Jen

Chinese name
- Traditional Chinese: 崔慈恩
- Simplified Chinese: 崔慈恩
Transcriptions
Standard Mandarin
- Hanyu Pinyin: Cuī Cí'ēn
Southern Min
- Hokkien POJ: Chhui Chû-un

Jenny Choy Tsi Jen (Chinese: 崔慈恩; pinyin: Cuī Cí'ēn; Pe̍h-ōe-jī: Chhui Chû-un; born 1 January 1988) is a Malaysian politician who has served as Deputy Speaker of the Perak State Legislative Assembly since December 2022 and Member of the Perak State Legislative Assembly (MLA) for Canning since May 2018. She is a member of the Democratic Action Party (DAP), a component party of the Pakatan Harapan (PH) and formerly Pakatan Rakyat (PR) coalitions.

== Early career ==
She is a software engineer and has worked in Malay-Sino Chemical Industries Sdn. Bhd from 2010 to 2011 and in Kuala Kepong Berhad from 2011 to 2018. She is a Bachelor of Business Information Systems (Computer Science) from Sunway University and Bachelor of Business Administration. Besides that, she has NCC International Advanced Diploma in Computer Studies.

== Political career ==
She joined Democratic Action Party in 2008 and was the political secretary for Wong Kah Woh. She was National Vice Chief of DAP Socialist Youth from 2018 to 2021.

== Election results ==
Perak State Legislative Assembly
Year	Constituency	Candidate	Votes	Pct	Opponent(s)	Votes	Pct	Ballots cast	Majority	Turnout
2018	N25 Canning	Jenny Choy Tsi Jen (DAP)	21,268	86.44%	Liew Kar Tuan (Gerakan)	2,976	12.10%	24,603	18,292	76.37%
2022	N25 Canning	Jenny Choy Tsi Jen (DAP)	22,527	87.10%	Woo Kok Toong (MCA)	1,793	6.93%	25,862	20,734	63.05%
2022	N25 Canning	Jenny Choy Tsi Jen (DAP)	22,527	87.10%	Pang Boon Yang (Gerakan)	1,542	5.96%	25,862	20,734	63.05%
