= Canning (state constituency) =

Political subdivision in Malaysia

Canning (N25)
Perak constituency

State constituency
- Legislature: Perak State Legislative Assembly
MLA
Jenny Choy Tsi Jen
PH
- Constituency created: 2003
- Constituency abolished: 2004
- Last contested: 2022

Demographics
- Electors (2022): 41,021

Canning is a state constituency in Perak, Malaysia, that has been represented in the Perak State Legislative Assembly.

== Demographics ==
Ethnic breakdown of Canning's electorate as of 2022
1. Chinese (79.4%)
2. Indian (9.94%)
3. Malay (9.31%)
4. Other ethnicities (1.39%)

== History ==
=== Polling districts ===
According to the federal gazette issued on 31 October 2022, the Canning constituency is divided into 12 polling districts.

State constituency	Polling districts	Code	Location
Canning（N25）	Taman Ipoh Timor	064/25/01	Kolej Vokasional Ipoh
Canning（N25）	Taman Ipoh Selatan	064/25/02	SK Marian Convent
Canning（N25）	Taman Wah Keong	064/25/03	SJK (C) Chung Tack
Canning（N25）	Simee Barat	064/25/04	SJK (C) Chung Tack
Canning（N25）	Simee Timor	064/25/05	SJK (T) Kg. Simee
Canning（N25）	Taman Ipoh	064/25/06	SK La Salle
Canning（N25）	Taman Ipoh Barat	064/25/07	SK La Salle
Canning（N25）	Canning Garden Barat	064/25/08	SK Marian Convent
Canning（N25）	Canning Garden Timor	064/25/09	SK Ho Seng Ong Methodist
Canning（N25）	Lumba Kuda	064/25/10	Sekolah Izzudin Shah
Canning（N25）	Taman Cempaka	064/25/11	SMK Raja Chulan
Canning（N25）	Desa Cempaka	064/25/12	SK Raja Chulan

=== Representation history ===
Members of the Legislative Assembly for Canning
Assembly	No	Years	Name	Party
Constituency created from Taman Canning
11th	N25	2004–2008	Vincent Hooi Wy Hon (许伟汉)	BN (GERAKAN)
12th	N25	2008–2013	Wong Kah Woh (黃家和)	PR (DAP)
13th	N25	2013–2015	Wong Kah Woh (黃家和)	PR (DAP)
13th	N25	2015–2018	Wong Kah Woh (黃家和)	PH (DAP)
14th	N25	2018–2022	Jenny Choy Tsi Jen (崔慈恩)	PH (DAP)
15th	N25	2022–present	Jenny Choy Tsi Jen (崔慈恩)	PH (DAP)

== Election results ==
Perak state election, 2022
Party	Candidate	Votes	%	∆%
PH	Jenny Choy Tsi Jen	22,527	87.10	▲87.10
BN	Woo Kok Toong	1,793	6.93	▼5.35
PN	Pang Boon Yang	1,542	5.96	▲5.96
Total valid votes		25,862	100.00	
Total rejected ballots		187		
Unreturned ballots		148		
Turnout		26,197	63.86	▼11.58
Registered electors		41,021		
Majority		20,734	80.17	▲4.73
PH hold		Swing		

Perak state election, 2018
Party	Candidate	Votes	%	∆%
PKR	Jenny Choy Tsi Jen	21,268	87.72	▲87.72
BN	Liew Kar Tuan	2,976	12.28	▼11.64
Total valid votes		24,244	98.54	
Total rejected ballots		206	0.84	
Unreturned ballots		153	0.62	
Turnout		24,603	76.37	▼3.43
Registered electors		32,215		
Majority		18,292	75.44	▲23.28
PKR hold		Swing		
Source(s) "Canning Result". undi.info.

Perak state election, 2013
Party	Candidate	Votes	%	∆%
DAP	Wong Kah Woh	21,068	76.08	▲10.34
BN	Ceylyn Tay Wei Lung	6,624	23.92	▼10.34
Total valid votes		27,692	98.61	
Total rejected ballots		302	1.08	
Unreturned ballots		88	0.31	
Turnout		28,082	79.80	▲6.53
Registered electors		35,181		
Majority		14,444	52.16	▲20.68
DAP hold		Swing		
Source(s) "KEPUTUSAN PILIHAN RAYA UMUM DEWAN UNDANGAN NEGERI".

Perak state election, 2008
Party	Candidate	Votes	%	∆%
DAP	Wong Kah Woh	13,923	65.74	▲11.11
BN	Vincent Hooi Wy Hon	8,257	34.26	▼11.11
Total valid votes		21,180	97.05	
Total rejected ballots		303	1.33	
Unreturned ballots		371	1.62	
Turnout		22,854	73.27	▲1.83
Registered electors		31,990		
Majority		5,666	31.48	▲22.22
DAP gain from BN		Swing		?
Source(s) "KEPUTUSAN PILIHAN RAYA UMUM DEWAN UNDANGAN NEGERI PERAK BAGI TAHUN 2008".

Perak state election, 2004
Party	Candidate	Votes	%
BN	Vincent Hooi Wy Hon	10,901	54.63
DAP	Teh Hock Ke	9,053	45.37
Total valid votes		19,954	97.32
Total rejected ballots		415	2.02
Unreturned ballots		135	0.66
Turnout		20,504	71.44
Registered electors		30,295	
Majority		1,848	9.26
This was a new constituency created.
Source(s) "KEPUTUSAN PILIHAN RAYA UMUM DEWAN UNDANGAN NEGERI PERAK BAGI TAHUN 2004".
