= Kinta District =

- District of Perak
- Daerah Kinta
- Location of Kinta District in Perak
- Interactive map of Kinta District
- Location of Kinta District in Malaysia
- Coordinates: 4°35′N 101°05′E
- Country: Malaysia
- State: Perak
- Seat: Batu Gajah
- Largest city: Ipoh
- Local area government(s): Ipoh City Council (Kinta North); Batu Gajah District Council (Kinta West)

Government
  - District officer: Tarmidzi Manap

Area
  - Total: 1,305 km^{2} (504 sq mi)

Population (2010)
  - Total: 744,715
  - Estimate (2015): 810,400
  - Density: 570.7/km^{2} (1,478/sq mi)
- Time zone: UTC+8 (MST)
  - Summer (DST): UTC+8 (Not observed)
- Postcode: 300xx-315xx
- Calling code: +6-05
- Vehicle registration plates: A

The Kinta District is a district in Perak, Malaysia. It contains the state capital Ipoh. Kinta is the most populated district in Perak and also the seventh most populated district in Malaysia. Kinta houses Ipoh, Perak's largest city and state capital while Batu Gajah is a seat in Kinta district.

== History ==
Kinta District was once famous for its tin, being one of the major tin producers in the 18th century. The discovery of substantial tin deposits in the Kinta Valley attracted a diverse influx of immigrants, particularly from China, who sought their fortunes in the lucrative mining trade. A railway line linking Ipoh and other towns in Kinta such as Pusing, Papan, Siputeh and Tronoh was completed in 1909 and used to transport tin ore. The tracks were dismantled by the Japanese during World War II and were never rebuilt. Shortly after the war ended, the tin industry deteriorated in Kinta.

Ex-Panglima Kinta Zainal Abidin, Panglima Kinta Abdul Wahab, Kulup Lembang (well known in Tambun), Panjang Seman, and Itam Harun were some of the well-known early Malay mining tycoons and landlords in Kinta. Their past involvement and contributions to the tin mining history of Kinta may have been overlooked or ignored by certain quarters, but should never be forgotten.

== Administrative divisions ==
Map of Kinta District

Kinta District is divided into 5 mukims, which are:

- Belanja (including Tronoh, Siputeh and Pusing)
- Sungai Terap (Batu Gajah town)
- Sungai Raia (including Simpang Pulai and Kampung Kepayang)
- Tanjung Tualang
- Hulu Kinta (including much of Ipoh's urban area, Tanjung Rambutan and Chemor)

=== Government ===
Kinta District is divided into 2 local authorities:

- Ipoh City Council, based in Ipoh, the state capital of Perak. Mainly in mukim Hulu Kinta.
- Batu Gajah District Council, based in the town of Batu Gajah. Mainly in mukim Sungai Terap, Belanja, Tanjung Tualang and Sungai Raia.

The district and land officer is also divided into Ipoh and Batu Gajah, and the Kinta District Office is centered at Batu Gajah.

Some areas in Sungai Raia such as RPT Tekah 1, RPT Tekah 2, RTC Gopeng & Gopeng Industrial Park are administered by the Kampar District Council even though they are located in the Kinta district.

== Demographics ==
The following is based on Department of Statistics Malaysia 2020 census.

Ethnic composition of Kinta District (2010)
| Ethnicities / Nationality | Percentage |
| Malays | 44.11% |
| Other Bumiputeras | 1.2% |
| Chinese | 36.2% |
| Indians | 12.41% |
| Others | 0.4% |
| Non-Malaysians | 5.68% |

| Ethnicity | 2010 | |
| Ethnicity | Pop. | % |
|---|---|---|
| Malays | 392015 | 44.11% |
| Other Bumiputeras | 10665 | 1.2% |
| Chinese | 321739 | 36.2% |
| Indians | 110294 | 12.41% |
| Others | 3565 | 0.4% |
| Malaysian total | 838278 | 94.32% |
| Non-Malaysian | 50489 | 5.68% |
| Total | 888767 | 100.00% |

Historical population
| Year | Pop. | ±% |
|---|---|---|
| 1970 | 477,758 | — |
| 1980 | 564,500 | +18.2% |
| 1991 | 627,899 | +11.2% |
| 2000 | 703,493 | +12.0% |
| 2010 | 749,474 | +6.5% |
| 2020 | 888,767 | +18.6% |
Figures before 2009 includes Kampar District.

== Federal Parliament and State Assembly Seats ==
List of Kinta district representatives in the Federal Parliament (Dewan Rakyat)

| Parliament | Seat Name | Member of Parliament | Party |
|---|---|---|---|
| P63 | Tambun | Anwar Ibrahim | Pakatan Harapan (PKR) |
| P64 | Ipoh Timor | Lee Chuan How | Pakatan Harapan (DAP) |
| P65 | Ipoh Barat | M. Kulasegaran | Pakatan Harapan (DAP) |
| P66 | Batu Gajah | V. Sivakumar | Pakatan Harapan (DAP) |
| P70 | Kampar | Chong Zhemin | Pakatan Harapan (DAP) |
| P71 | Gopeng | Tan Kar Hing | Pakatan Harapan (PKR) |

List of Kinta district representatives in the State Legislative Assembly of Perak

| Parliament | State | Seat Name | State Assemblyman | Party |
|---|---|---|---|---|
| P63 | N23 | Manjoi | Hafez Sabri | Perikatan Nasional (PAS) |
| P63 | N24 | Hulu Kinta | Muhammad Arafat Varisai | Pakatan Harapan (PKR) |
| P64 | N25 | Canning | Jenny Choy Tsi Jen | Pakatan Harapan (DAP) |
| P64 | N26 | Tebing Tinggi | Abdul Aziz Bari | Pakatan Harapan (DAP) |
| P64 | N27 | Pasir Pinji | Goh Sze Hua | Pakatan Harapan (DAP) |
| P65 | N28 | Bercham | Ong Boon Piow | Pakatan Harapan (DAP) |
| P65 | N29 | Kepayang | Nga Kor Ming | Pakatan Harapan (DAP) |
| P65 | N30 | Buntong | Thulsi Thivani Manogaran | Pakatan Harapan (DAP) |
| P66 | N31 | Jelapang | Cheah Poh Hian | Pakatan Harapan (DAP) |
| P66 | N32 | Menglembu | Chaw Kam Foon | Pakatan Harapan (DAP) |
| P66 | N33 | Tronoh | Steven Tiw Tee Siang | Pakatan Harapan (DAP) |
| P70 | N41 | Malim Nawar | Bavani Veriah Shasha | Pakatan Harapan (DAP) |
| P70 | N43 | Tualang Sekah | Mohd Azlan Helmi | Pakatan Harapan (PKR) |
| P71 | N44 | Sungai Rapat | Mohammad Nizar Jamaluddin | Pakatan Harapan (AMANAH) |
| P71 | N45 | Simpang Pulai | Ng Chai Yi | Pakatan Harapan (PKR) |

== See also ==
- Districts of Malaysia
