= 2020 vote of no confidence in the Faizal Azumu ministry =

2020 political event in Malaysia

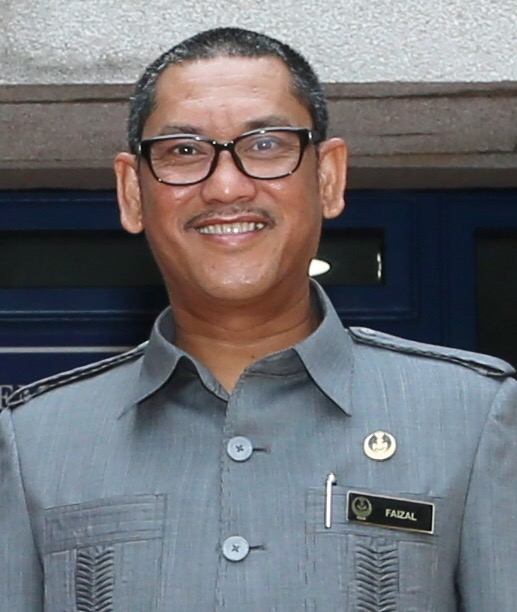
Chief Minister Ahmad Faizal Azumu lost the vote of no confidence by thirty eight votes.

A vote of no confidence in the Malaysian state of Perak National Alliance–National Front (PN–BN) government of Ahmad Faizal Azumu occurred on 4 December 2020. The 'vote of confidence' was initially brought by Abdul Manap Hashim before being called for by the Leader of the Opposition Abdul Aziz Bari and supported by Maslin Sham Razman. The vote was subsequently lost by the PN–BN Government by thirty eight votes (10 votes to 48), which was announced at 11:13 am. The result did not, however, necessarily mandate a general election as the outgoing Perak chief minister has the option of advising the Sultan of Perak to dissolve the assembly or, alternatively, appoint an assemblyman who he deems to command the majority. Faizal later confirmed that he would not advise the sultan to dissolve the Perak State Legislative Assembly as the "current situation is not conducive for an election" due to the COVID-19 pandemic in Malaysia. This was the fourth instance in which a Malaysian head of government of a state or territory was ousted from office through a confidence vote.

== Background ==
The general election at the beginning of May 2018 resulted in the Alliance of Hope (PH) being voted into power at the vast majority of Peninsular Malaysia's west coast states, including Perak where Faizal was sworn-in as its chief minister. However, the 2020 Malaysian political crisis, triggered by the resignation of then Malaysian United Indigenous Party (BERSATU) chairman and prime minister Mahathir Mohamad, led to the subsequent departure from PH by BERSATU in its entirety. This, in turn, caused the PH to lose its majority in multiple states which included Perak, where BERSATU joined hands with the United Malays National Organisation (UMNO) and Malaysian Islamic Party (PAS) to form a new government. On 13 March 2020, Faizal was reappointed as chief minister under the new coalition government.

It has been speculated that there was widespread unhappiness within the UMNO regarding their treatment by the BERSATU leadership. Amongst foremost matters within UMNO's Perak chapter was dissatisfaction stemming from the latter's supposed disrespect towards UMNO by allegedly having members from his party dominate the number of appointed positions despite having considerably less assemblymen in the state assembly. According to former BN secretary-general Mohamed Nazri Abdul Aziz, the "final straw" for UMNO was Faizal's unilateral move in October 2020 to appoint Aznel Ibrahim, UMNO's assemblyman for Pengkalan Hulu, as his political secretary without consultation with his party.

Speaker of the Perak State Legislative Assembly Mohamad Zahir Abdul Khalid announced on 30 November 2020 that he received and accepted a 'motion of confidence' from Abdul Manap Hashim (UMNO–Pengkalan Baharu) on the chief minister which will be tabled in the upcoming assembly sitting. Amongst the opposition, the People's Justice Party (PKR) was first to announce that it will not back Faizal in the motion. The Government arranged for this motion to be debated after the presentation of the state government budget on Friday 4 December as an Opposition motion in Government time. However, emergency motions were filed by Salbiah Mohamed (UMNO–Temenggor) and Lee Chuan How (DAP–Pasir Pinji) to bring forward the vote to before the budget presentation. The bipartisan move prompted Speaker Zahir Khalid to call for a vote to approve the motions. With a final tally of 45–9, the emergency motions were approved and the vote then began.

== Vote ==
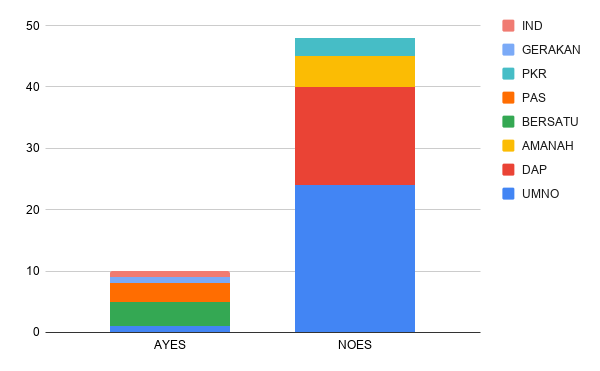
Top part of chart of votes by party. Ayes: BERSATU; PAS; GERAKAN; UMNO; IND. Noes: UMNO; DAP; AMANAH; PKR.

The government lost by thirty eight votes. Ahmad Faizal Azumu stated that he did not anticipate that the large majority of assemblymen from the United Malays National Organisation (UMNO), a BN component party, would turn against him.

4 December 2020; Vote of confidence in the Faizal Azumu ministry Motion proposed by Abdul Manap Hashim MLA; Absolute majority: 30/59
Vote	Parties	Votes
Aye	Malaysian United Indigenous Party (4); Malaysian Islamic Party (3); Malaysian People's Movement Party (1); United Malays National Organisation (1); Independent (1)	10 / 59
No	United Malays National Organisation (24); Democratic Action Party (16); National Trust Party (5); People's Justice Party (3)	48 / 59
Abstentions	Malaysian United Indigenous Party (1)	1 / 59
Vacant	(0)	0 / 59

=== National Front ===
With relations between UMNO and Faizal's BERSATU fractured at the federal level, the move by the former to remove Faizal from office is seen as not only to showcase UMNO's dissatisfaction towards BERSATU, but also a tit-for-tat move following BERSATU's insistence on holding the office of the Sabah chief minister despite UMNO having more assemblymen in that state. Nonetheless, there was a sole UMNO assemblymen who broke party ranks and voted in support of Faizal. Osman Sapian, BERSATU's former Johor chief minister, quickly threatened retaliation in the Johor State Legislative Assembly. Nonetheless, it is expected that the PN–BN government will remain intact with a different assemblyman as chief minister as UMNO's aim was to force through one of its own into the chief minister's office. Three candidates that are rumoured to be considered by UMNO to take the reins includes former chief minister Zambry Abdul Kadir, UMNO's Perak state chairman Saarani Mohammad, and Shahrul Zaman Yahya.

=== Alliance of Hope ===
As the opposition in the assembly, the PH coalition which consisted of the Democratic Action Party (DAP), National Trust Party (AMANAH), and People's Justice Party (PKR), unsurprisingly voted against Faizal. All 24 of PH's assemblymen was confirmed to have voted to have no confidence in Faizal's leadership. Political analysts observed that the vote was likely not a concerted effort between the opposition and UMNO as the PH would have voted similarly regardless as they were unhappy with Faizal's party for triggering the 2020 Malaysian political crisis earlier in 2020. It was also added that the vote can also be seen as the culmination of previous efforts to unseat Faizal that began whilst the latter was still part of the then-PH administration.

=== National Alliance ===
All PN assemblymen, four from BERSATU and three from the PAS, voted in support of Faizal with one abstention.

=== Confidence of Supply ===
Outside of the PN, BN, and PH coalitions, the Perak state legislative assembly consisted of two other assemblymen of which one is from the Malaysian People's Movement Party (GERAKAN) and the other an independent. It can be noted, however, that prior to the 2020 Malaysian political crisis, both of these assemblymen represented the DAP before resigning from their party to continue in the government. Both assemblymen voted in support of Faizal. Following GERAKAN's acceptance into the PN coalition in February 2021, both assemblymen joined BERSATU as associate members in a move that saw GERAKAN losing its sole elected representative to its new ally.

== Aftermath ==
When a vote of no confidence is passed, the government must either resign and request a dissolution of the assembly from the monarch or allow the monarch to exercise His Majesty's vested power to appoint a new chief minister whom he thinks most likely commands majority support. This was established following decisions made in Mohammad Nizar Jamaluddin v Zambry Abdul Kadir which coincidentally resolved the 2009 Perak constitutional crisis concerning the position of the Perak chief minister previously. The assembly was not dissolved immediately after the vote, with Faizal choosing against advising the sultan to do so, which, paves the way for the latter to decide on a new chief minister. Nonetheless, Faizal, along with his entire executive council, submitted their resignation to the monarch on 5 December 2020. The resignation of the government was officially accepted the following day as announced by the Comptroller of the Royal Household of Perak.

In the days following the vote, Sultan Nazrin Muizzuddin Shah of Perak granted audiences to the following party leaders and politicians to determine the assemblyman with majority support:

Party Leader	Legislative Office	Political Party	Political Coalition	Political Office	Time of Audience
Asmuni Awi	MLA for Manjoi	National Trust Party	Alliance of Hope	Chairman, Perak State Liaison Committee	5 December 2020; 11:00am & 8 December 2020; 3:15 pm
Nga Kor Ming	MP for Teluk Intan	Democratic Action Party	Alliance of Hope	Deputy Secretary-General	5 December 2020; 11:00am & 8 December 2020; 3:15 pm
Nga Kor Ming	MLA for Aulong	Democratic Action Party	Alliance of Hope	Chairman, Perak State Liaison Committee	5 December 2020; 11:00am & 8 December 2020; 3:15 pm
Farhash Wafa Salvador Rizal Mubarak	–	People's Justice Party	Alliance of Hope	Chairman, Perak State Liaison Committee	5 December 2020; 11:00am & 8 December 2020; 3:15 pm
Saarani Mohammad	MLA for Kota Tampan	United Malays National Organisation	National Front	Chairman, Perak State Liaison Committee	5 December 2020; 11:40 am & 8 December 2020; 10:00 am & 8 December 2020; 4:00 pm
Ahmad Faizal Azumu	MP for Tambun	Malaysian United Indigenous Party	National Alliance	Deputy President	5 December 2020; 3:00 pm
Ahmad Faizal Azumu	MLA for Chenderiang	Malaysian United Indigenous Party	National Alliance	Chairman, Perak State Liaison Committee	5 December 2020; 3:00 pm
Ahmad Zahid Hamidi	MP for Bagan Datuk	United Malays National Organisation	National Front	President	6 December 2020; 10:00 am & 8 December 2020; 10:00 am
Mohamad Zahir Abdul Khalid	Speaker of Perak; State Legislative Assembly	United Malays National Organisation	National Front	–	8 December 2020; 11:00 am
Hasnul Zulkarnain Abdul Munaim	MLA for Titi Serong	Malaysian United Indigenous Party	National Alliance	–	8 December 2020; 11:50 am
Zambry Abdul Kadir	MLA for Pangkor	United Malays National Organisation	National Front	Member, Supreme Council	8 December 2020; 4:00 pm

In a press conference called by PAS's secretary-general Takiyuddin Hassan, the party publicly stated that they will not participate in efforts to form a new government. The party's Perak state commissioner and Gunung Semanggol assemblyman Razman Zakaria also added that his party will remain committed in retaining a PN-led government in Perak. Following increasing speculation that UMNO may look to cooperate with the PH in forming a new government, PAS deputy president Tuan Ibrahim Tuan Man commented that his party was prepared to compromise with its earlier stand of avoiding involvement in moves to form a new government if it ensures that the PH will be prevented from returning to power in the state.

Unconfirmed reports emerged in the afternoon of 6 December 2020 that UMNO ultimately decided on Saarani Mohammad as their preferred candidate to become the new chief minister. A previously touted candidate for the office, Shahrul Zaman Yahya, posted on his Instagram account the following day that all Perak BN assemblymen reached a consensus to nominate Saarani as their candidate. Simultaneously, a significant development that was rumoured to be gaining traction due to increasing distrust between UMNO and BERSATU was the potential cooperation between long-time political arch-rivals, UMNO and DAP, as noted by former BERSATU supreme council member Abdul Kadir Jasin. Speculation further increased following similar statements released by UMNO president Ahmad Zahid Hamidi and DAP deputy secretary-general Nga Kor Ming indicating their respective parties' willingness to work with one another.

Further implications were seen in the southern state of Johor, where the BN–PN government holds a one-seat majority in the assembly. It held its own budget tabling on 6 December 2020, and, saw it passed unanimously. Johor chief minister Hasni Mohammad, who is from UMNO, later revealed that he acceded to the requests from the state opposition to triple their allocation from RM50,000 to 150,000 and provided them with a further one-off "COVID-19 RM50,000 allocation" that was originally only earmarked for government assemblymen. He also called the PH as "strategic partners" in his winding-up speech of the budget tabling which was seen as efforts to prevent BERSATU from exacting revenge. The move was later lauded by state PH leaders whom labelled the state as a "model of bipartisan government".

After a PAS central committee meeting on 7 December, its Perak commissioner Razman Zakaria informed the press that he will be seeking an audience with the sultan sometime between 2:30 and 3:00 pm the following day. This was after Saarani publicly remarked that UMNO was open to keeping the status quo of retaining a PN–BN government in Perak. However, it was later learnt that Razman was ordered to cancel his audience by his party's central committee for unknown reasons. Following a flurry of audiences between party leaders and assemblymen from a number of parties with the sultan, the Perak palace announced that as of 5:00 pm on 8 December 2020, there was still no assemblyman that commanded the majority support.

After a meeting between the presidents of UMNO, PAS and BERSATU at the Parliament of Malaysia on 9 December 2020, the parties' respective secretaries-general released a joint statement affirming their support for Saarani as the next chief minister. Shortly after the decision, PAS and BERSATU assemblymen submitted their statutory declarations (SDs) to the sultan around 4:30 pm. The secretary of BERSATU's Perak branch added that he also submitted SDs from Sivasubramaniam Athinarayanan (GERAKAN–Buntong) and Tronoh assemblyman Paul Yong Choo Kiong, a PN–aligned independent. At around 6:00 pm, the Comptroller of the Perak Royal Household, on behalf of the sultan, announced that His Majesty was satisfied that Saarani commanded the majority of the assembly and will therefore be sworn-in as new chief minister at 11:00 am 10 December 2020. The swearing-in ceremony was scheduled to take place at the Iskandariah Palace, Kuala Kangsar.

In March 2021, the sole BERSATU vote that was not in support of Faizal was revealed to be that of Hasnul Zulkarnain Abdul Munaim (BERSATU–Titi Serong). As a result, BERSATU's secretary from its Perak branch confirmed that Zulkarnain has subsequently been expelled from the party effective 20 December 2020.

== See also ==
- 2009 Perak constitutional crisis
