= Ipoh City Council =

Ipoh City Council Majlis Bandaraya Ipoh
- Emblem

- Flag

Type
- Type: City council of Ipoh

History
- Founded: 27 May 1988
- Preceded by: Ipoh Municipal Council

Leadership
- Mayor: Zamakhshari Hanipah since 16 April 2025
- Secretary: Ahmad Munir Ishak since Not defined

Structure
- Seats: 24
- Political groups: Councillors: PH (19): DAP (11); PKR (6); AMANAH (2); BN (5): UMNO (5)
- Length of term: 16 February 2023 - 15 February 2024

Motto
- Service and Progress (Berkhidmat dan Maju)

Meeting place
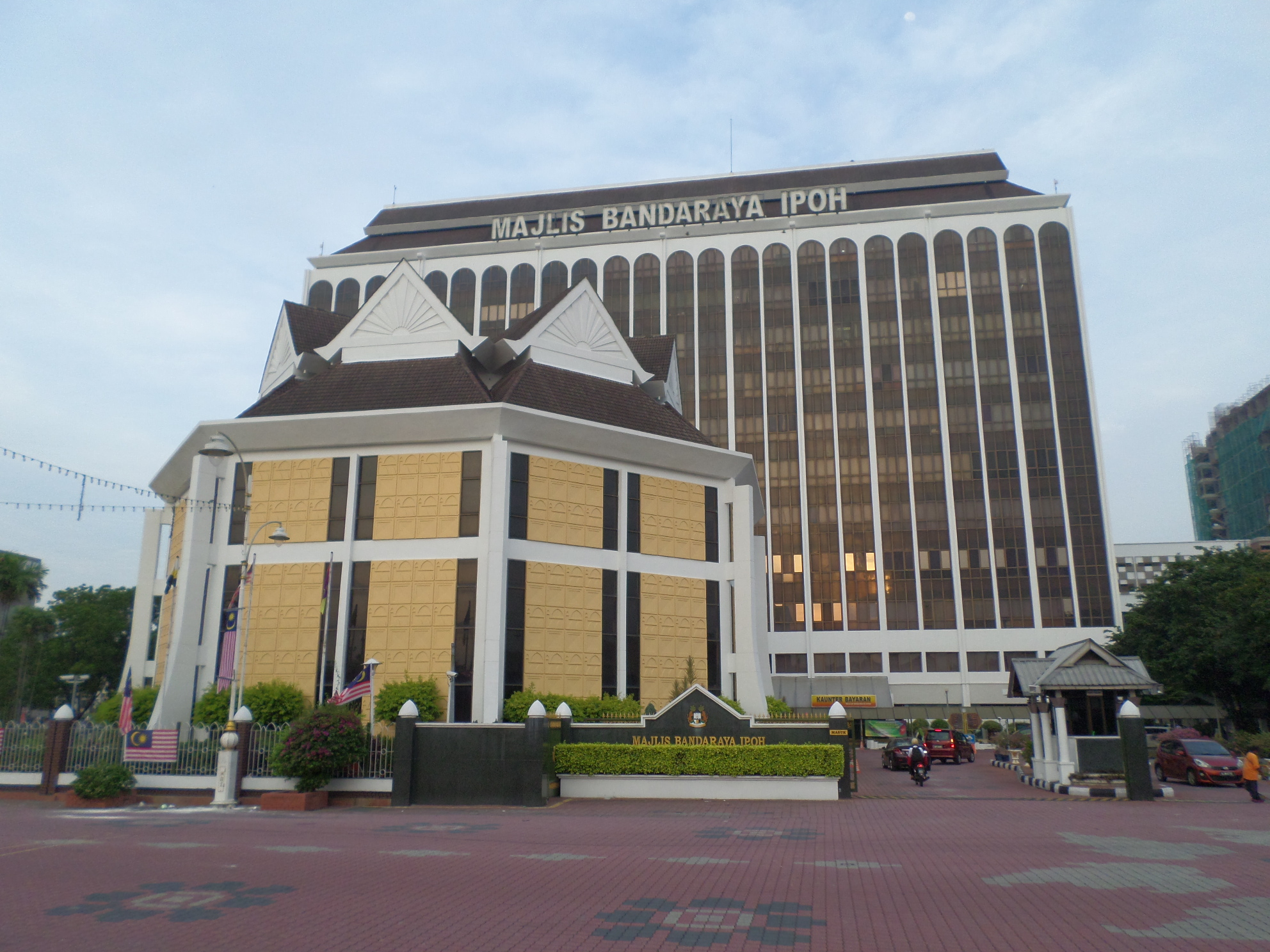
- MBI Building; Jalan Sultan Abdul Jalil, Greentown, 30450 Ipoh, Perak, Malaysia; 4.59866°N 101.08992°E

Website
- mbi.gov.my/en

Constitution
- Local Government Act 1976

The Ipoh City Council (Malay: Majlis Bandaraya Ipoh, abbreviated MBI) is the city council which administers the city of Ipoh in the state of Perak, Malaysia. This council was established after the city was officially granted city status on 27 May 1988. Their jurisdiction covers an area of 643 square kilometres.

The council consists of the mayor plus twenty-four councillors appointed to serve a one-year term by the Perak State Government. MBI is responsible for public health and sanitation, waste removal and management, town planning, environmental protection and building control, social and economic development and general maintenance functions of urban infrastructure.

== History ==
Ipoh City Council started as a Sanitary Board in 1893, formed by the British. From its gradual and sturdy development, it obtained its Municipal status on 31 May 1962 and was declared a city on 27 May 1988.

In general, the Ipoh City Council as the local authority, is a Corporate Body established under the Local Government Act 1976 (Act 171), being the body responsible for managing the Ipoh City area based on local interest, as well as a local planning authority under the Town and Country Planning Act 1976 (Act 172); MBI is directly tasked by Law to formulate and implement development planning policies based on centralised locality in accordance to the policies set by the Government.

Currently, the boundary of the Council covers an area of 643 square kilometres with a population of over 720,000 people. As the state capital of Perak, Ipoh serves as the centre of administration, commerce, sports, finance, politics, religion and education. Now under the leadership of the Mayor, the Ipoh City Council continues its effort to transform the city into a dynamic and distinguished city.

=== Appointed mayors of Ipoh ===
No	Mayor	Term start	Term end
1	Umar Abu	27 May 1988	31 May 1993
2	Ismail Shah Bodin	1 June 1993	31 December 1994
3	Ahmad Saleh Sarif	2 January 1995	31 December 1997
4	Talaat Husain	1 February 1998	2 December 2002
5	Sirajuddin Salleh	3 December 2002	15 April 2004
6	Hassan Nawawi Abdul Rahman	1 May 2004	23 July 2006
7	Mohd Rafiai Moktar	24 July 2006	5 June 2008
8	Roshidi Hashim	23 July 2008	2 January 2014
9	Harun Rawi	2 January 2014	30 June 2015
10	Zamri Man	1 July 2015	1 July 2019
11	Ahmad Suaidi	1 July 2019	31 March 2020
12	Rumaizi Baharin	1 April 2020	27 Mar 2025
13	Zamakhshari Hanipah	16 April 2025	Incumbent

== Current appointed councillors ==
=== 2023/2024 Session ===
PH (19)	BN (5)
DAP (11); PKR (6); AMANAH (2)	UMNO (5)

Parliament Seat	State Assembly Seat	No.	Zone	Councilor	Alliance	Party
P63 Tambun	N24 Hulu Kinta	1	Khantan; Kuang; Kampong Chik; Kampung Ulu Chemor; Tanah Hitam; Changkat Kinding; Hospital Bahagia; Bandar Baru Putra	Mazlan Abd Rahman	BN	UMNO
P63 Tambun	N24 Hulu Kinta	2	Tanjong Rambutan Utara; Tanjong Rambutan Barat; Kampung Tersusun Batu 8; Pakatan Jaya; Taman Perpaduan; Kampung Tersusun Batu 5; Jalan Tambun; Tambun; Bandar Sunway; Kawasan Polis Hutan; Tanjong Rambutan	Norhayati Sani	PH	PKR
P63 Tambun	N23 Manjoi	3	Kampong Ulu Chepor; Kuala Kuang; Chemor Indah; Pekan Chemor; Kampong Chepor Dalam	Faidz Ismail	PH	AMANAH
P63 Tambun	N23 Manjoi	4	Kampong Sungai Kati; Kampong Datuk Ahmad Said Tambahan 2 Selatan; Tun Terang; Kampung Sungai Tapah; Taman Keledang Jaya; Kampong Tengku Hussein; Kampong Seberang Manjoi; Germuda	Ahmad Khair Faizal Yahaya	PH	PKR
P63 Tambun	N23 Manjoi	5	Meru; Meru Jaya; Taman Jati; Kelabang	Azizul Kama Abd Aziz	BN	UMNO
P65 Ipoh Barat	N30 Buntong	6	Kampong Baru Buntong; Jalan Klian Intan; Jalan Silibin; Jalan Tun Abdul Razak; Taman Lim	Lawrence R.Palanisamy	PH	DAP
P65 Ipoh Barat	N30 Buntong	7	Kampong Kacang Puteh; Desa Rishah; Falim; Jalan Sungai Pari	Sivam Kalimuthu	PH	DAP
P65 Ipoh Barat	N29 Kepayang	8	Star Park; Fair Park; Waller Court; Jalan Datuk Onn Jaafar; Jalan Bijih Timah; Jalan CM Yusof; Jalan Raja Ekram; Greentown	Wong Kar Keat	PH	DAP
P65 Ipoh Barat	N29 Kepayang	9	Kampong Pisang; Kepayang Mesjid; Gunong Lang; Gurap; Taman Che Wan	Norul Huda Ahmad	BN	UMNO
P65 Ipoh Barat	N28 Bercham	10	Kampong Tawas; Kampung Tawas Utara; Tasek; Tasek Dermawan	Logiswary Subramaniam	PH	PKR
P65 Ipoh Barat	N28 Bercham	11	Bercham Selatan; Dermawan Utara; Kampong Bercham; Bercham Timor	Ng Haen Vee	PH	DAP
P64 Ipoh Timur	N25 Canning	12	Canning Garden Barat; Canning Garden Timor; Taman Ipoh Barat; Taman Ipoh; Simee Barat; Simee Timor; Taman Wah Keong	Lam Yew Tect	PH	DAP
P64 Ipoh Timur	N25 Canning	13	Lumba Kuda; Taman Cempaka; Desa Cempaka; Taman Ipoh Selatan; Taman Ipoh Timor	Lee Tze Hoo	PH	DAP
P64 Ipoh Timur	N27 Pasir Pinji	14	Pinji Lane Selatan; Pinji Lane Utara; Pasir Pinji Utara; Pasir Pinji Selatan; Kampar Road; Housing Trust	Lim Chee Aun	PH	DAP
P64 Ipoh Timur	N27 Pasir Pinji	15	Taman Pengkalan Jaya; Pasir Puteh Selatan; Pasir Puteh Baru; Pasir Puteh Utara; Jalan Bendahara	Basri Mohamad Nor	BN	UMNO
P64 Ipoh Timur	N26 Tebing Tinggi	16	Kampong Seri Kinta; Kuala Pari Hilir; Tebing Tinggi; Sungai Kinta; Kampong Paloh; Jalan Tun Perak; Jalan Sultan Yusof; Jalan Dato Maharaja Lela; Tebing Sungai Kinta	Ahmad Fariq Walit Ahmad Puad	PH	DAP
P64 Ipoh Timur	N26 Tebing Tinggi	17	Pengkalan Barat; Pengkalan Gate; Pengkalan Pegoh	Ahmad Hariri Haji Kamarudin	BN	UMNO
P66 Batu Gajah	N31 Jelapang	18	Jelapang Tengah; Bukit Kledang; Taman Pertama; Taman Rishah	Tang Cheng Wei	PH	DAP
P66 Batu Gajah	N31 Jelapang	19	Silibin; Jelapang; Jelapang Selatan; Jelapang Barat; Jelapang Utara; Jelapang Timor	Tan Seong Peng	PH	DAP
P66 Batu Gajah	N32 Menglembu	20	Lahat; Bukit Merah Selatan; Bukit Merah Barat Daya; Bukit Merah Tengah; Bukit Merah Barat; Bukit Merah Timor; Menglembu Selatan; Menglembu Barat; Menglembu Lama; Bandar Baru Menglembu; Awana	Chen Jian Cong	PH	DAP
P71 Gopeng	N44 Sungai Rapat	21	Sungai Rokam; Sungai Rapat; Rapat Jaya; Desa Pakatan; Desa Pelancongan; Sri Rahmat; Sri Jaya; Kampong Pisang; Ara Payong	Syamsul Effendey Abd Rahim	PH	AMANAH
P71 Gopeng	N45 Simpang Pulai	22	Rapat Setia Baru; Rapat Setia; Gunung Rapat Selatan; Gunung Rapat Utara	Chung Cum Cheong	PH	PKR
P71 Gopeng	N45 Simpang Pulai	23	Taman Ipoh Jaya; Pekan Razaki; Kampong Seri Ampang; Ampang Baharu; Taman Ampang	Mohamed Helmi Mohamed Fuzi	PH	PKR
P71 Gopeng	N45 Simpang Pulai	24	Botani; Taman Taufik; Taman Bersatu; Simpang Pulai; Kampong Sengat	Zuraidah Zakaria	PH	PKR

== Departments ==
1. Pejabat Korporat Bandaraya
2. Jabatan Kesihatan
3. Jabatan Perlesenan dan Penguatkuasaan
4. Jabatan Penilaian & Pengurusan Harta
5. Jabatan Kejuruteraan
6. Jabatan Perancang
7. Jabatan Kewangan
8. Jabatan Landskap & Rekreasi
9. Jabatan Hal Ehwal Komuniti
10. Jabatan Bangunan
11. Jabatan Khidmat Pengurusan
12. Pejabat Penasihat Undang-Undang
13. Pejabat Audit Dalaman
14. Pejabat Pesuruhjaya Bangunan (COB)
15. Pejabat OSC (One Stop Centre)
16. Pejabat Pembangunan Projek Khas Bandaraya

== Administration Area ==
Below are the administration area for Ipoh City Council which further breakdown into 24 zones.

ZONE 1A

- Klebang Jaya
- Klebang Putra
- Klebang Restu
- Klebang Prima

ZONE 1B

- Taman Chemor Sinaran
- Bunga Raya
- Chemor Sejahtera
- Chemor Idaman

ZONE 2

- Taman Meru
- Meru 2B
- Meru 2C

ZONE 3

- Tawas
- Tasek
- Ipoh Groove

ZONE 4

- Meru Raya
- Halaman Meru Permai
- Meru Impian
- Meru Damai
- Meru Perdana

ZONE 5

- Bercham
- Tasek Dermawan

ZONE 6

- Jelapang
- Taman Pertama
- Rishah

ZONE 7

- Taman Jati
- Meru 3C
- Meru Jaya
- Gerbang Meru Indah

ZONE 8

- Tembok
- Cherry Garden
- Lim Garden

ZONE 9

- Kepayang
- Fair Park
- Bandar Ipoh Raya

ZONE 10

- Kampung Simee
- Ipoh Garden
- Canning Garden

ZONE 11A

- Bandar Baru Tambun
- Taman Koperasi
- Bandar Sunway Ipoh

ZONE 11B

- Taman Perpaduan
- Taman Pakatan Jaya
- Bercham Jaya
- Taman Malar
- Taman Hiburan
- Taman Saga
- Taman Bagus
- Taman Mewah
- Lembah Perpaduan Permai

ZONE 12

- Buntong
- Silibin

ZONE 13

- Greentown
- Pekan Lama
- Medan Kidd

ZONE 14

- Cempaka
- Taman Golf
- Lumba Kuda

ZONE 15

- Sungai Rokam
- Ipoh Jaya
- Ampang

ZONE 16

- Pekan Baru
- Tebing Tinggi
- Pasir Pinji

ZONE 17

- Menglembu
- Falim

ZONE 18

- Pasir Putih
- Seri Kinta
- Kuala Pari

ZONE 19

- Kampung Sungai Rapat
- Pengkalan Pegoh
- Pengkalan Gate

ZONE 20

- Gunung Rapat
- Rapat Setia
- Taman Song Choon

ZONE 21

- Lahat
- Bukit Merah

ZONE 22

- Sengat
- Rapat Jaya
- Changkat Larang

== Former Appointed Councillors ==
=== July 2018-July 2019 Session ===
PH (22)	NGO (2)
DAP (10); AMANAH (4); BERSATU (4); PKR (4)

=== 1 Mei 2021-30 April 2023 Session ===
BN (12)	PN (12)
UMNO (7); MCA (3); MIC (2)	BERSATU (7); PAS (5)

Parliament Seat	State Assembly Seat	No.	Zone	Councilor	Alliance	Party
P63 Tambun	N24 Hulu Kinta	1	Khantan; Kuang; Kampong Chik; Kampung Ulu Chemor; Tanah Hitam; Changkat Kinding; Hospital Bahagia; Bandar Baru Putra	Mazlan Abd Rahman	BN	UMNO
P63 Tambun	N24 Hulu Kinta	2	Tanjong Rambutan Utara; Tanjong Rambutan Barat; Kampung Tersusun Batu 8; Pakatan Jaya; Taman Perpaduan; Kampung Tersusun Batu 5; Jalan Tambun; Tambun; Bandar Sunway; Kawasan Polis Hutan; Tanjong Rambutan	Puteri Holijah Muhamad Rali	PN	BERSATU
P63 Tambun	N23 Manjoi	3	Kampong Ulu Chepor; Kuala Kuang; Chemor Indah; Pekan Chemor; Kampong Chepor Dalam	Mohammad Sharif	PN	BERSATU
P63 Tambun	N23 Manjoi	4	Kampong Sungai Kati; Kampong Datuk Ahmad Said Tambahan 2 Selatan; Tun Terang; Kampung Sungai Tapah; Taman Keledang Jaya; Kampong Tengku Hussein; Kampong Seberang Manjoi; Germuda	Syed Mohd Noor Hisam Syed Hassan	PN	PAS
P63 Tambun	N23 Manjoi	5	Meru; Meru Jaya; Taman Jati; Kelabang	Azizul Kama Abd Aziz	BN	UMNO
P65 Ipoh Barat	N30 Buntong	6	Kampong Baru Buntong; Jalan Klian Intan; Jalan Silibin; Jalan Tun Abdul Razak; Taman Lim	Jayagopi M.Subramaniam	BN	MIC
P65 Ipoh Barat	N30 Buntong	7	Kampong Kacang Puteh; Desa Rishah; Falim; Jalan Sungai Pari	Ganesan Athinarayanan	PN	BERSATU
P65 Ipoh Barat	N29 Kepayang	8	Star Park; Fair Park; Waller Court; Jalan Datuk Onn Jaafar; Jalan Bijih Timah; Jalan CM Yusof; Jalan Raja Ekram; Greentown	Mohammad Iskandar Abdul Rahman	PN	BERSATU
P65 Ipoh Barat	N29 Kepayang	9	Kampong Pisang; Kepayang Mesjid; Gunong Lang; Gurap; Taman Che Wan	Norul Huda Ahmad	BN	UMNO
P65 Ipoh Barat	N28 Bercham	10	Kampong Tawas; Kampung Tawas Utara; Tasek; Tasek Dermawan	Mohd Rafaad Razalli	PN	PAS
P65 Ipoh Barat	N28 Bercham	11	Bercham Selatan; Dermawan Utara; Kampong Bercham; Bercham Timor	Ho Wai Mun	BN	MCA
P64 Ipoh Timur	N25 Canning	12	Canning Garden Barat; Canning Garden Timor; Taman Ipoh Barat; Taman Ipoh; Simee Barat; Simee Timor; Taman Wah Keong	Thilak Raj Gunasekaran	PN	PAS
P64 Ipoh Timur	N25 Canning	13	Lumba Kuda; Taman Cempaka; Desa Cempaka; Taman Ipoh Selatan; Taman Ipoh Timor	Kamarulzaman Abdullah	BN	UMNO
P64 Ipoh Timur	N27 Pasir Pinji	14	Pinji Lane Selatan; Pinji Lane Utara; Pasir Pinji Utara; Pasir Pinji Selatan; Kampar Road; Housing Trust	Richard Ng	PN	BERSATU
P64 Ipoh Timur	N27 Pasir Pinji	15	Taman Pengkalan Jaya; Pasir Puteh Selatan; Pasir Puteh Baru; Pasir Puteh Utara; Jalan Bendahara	Khoo Boon Chuan	BN	MCA
P64 Ipoh Timur	N26 Tebing Tinggi	16	Kampong Seri Kinta; Kuala Pari Hilir; Tebing Tinggi; Sungai Kinta; Kampong Paloh; Jalan Tun Perak; Jalan Sultan Yusof; Jalan Dato Maharaja Lela; Tebing Sungai Kinta	Ahmad Hariri Kamarudin	BN	UMNO
P64 Ipoh Timur	N26 Tebing Tinggi	17	Pengkalan Barat; Pengkalan Gate; Pengkalan Pegoh	Nor Afzainizam Salleh	PN	BERSATU
P66 Batu Gajah	N31 Jelapang	18	Jelapang Tengah; Bukit Kledang; Taman Pertama; Taman Rishah	Jaya Ganesh Selvaraju	BN	MIC
P66 Batu Gajah	N31 Jelapang	19	Silibin; Jelapang; Jelapang Selatan; Jelapang Barat; Jelapang Utara; Jelapang Timor	Chan Soon Yip	BN	MCA
P66 Batu Gajah	N32 Menglembu	20	Lahat; Bukit Merah Selatan; Bukit Merah Barat Daya; Bukit Merah Tengah; Bukit Merah Barat; Bukit Merah Timor; Menglembu Selatan; Menglembu Barat; Menglembu Lama; Bandar Baru Menglembu; Awana	Mahader Ahmad Mohammad Ayob	PN	BERSATU
P71 Gopeng	N44 Sungai Rapat	21	Sungai Rokam; Sungai Rapat; Rapat Jaya; Desa Pakatan; Desa Pelancongan; Sri Rahmat; Sri Jaya; Kampong Pisang; Ara Payong	Abu Bakar Haji Hussian	PN	PAS
P71 Gopeng	N45 Simpang Pulai	22	Rapat Setia Baru; Rapat Setia; Gunung Rapat Selatan; Gunung Rapat Utara	Mohd Nasri Shaari	BN	UMNO
P71 Gopeng	N45 Simpang Pulai	23	Taman Ipoh Jaya; Pekan Razaki; Kampong Seri Ampang; Ampang Baharu; Taman Ampang	Mohamad Annuar Baharudin	BN	UMNO
P71 Gopeng	N45 Simpang Pulai	24	Botani; Taman Taufik; Taman Bersatu; Simpang Pulai; Kampong Sengat	Azmi Murad Mohamad Yusof	PN	PAS
