= Ipoh Barat =

Federal constituency in Perak, Malaysia

Ipoh Barat (P065)
Perak constituency

Federal constituency
- Legislature: Dewan Rakyat
- MP: Kulasegaran Murugeson; PH
- Constituency created: 1994
- First contested: 1995
- Last contested: 2022

Demographics
- Population (2020): 134,978
- Electors (2022): 114,654
- Area (km²): 37
- Pop. density (per km²): 3,648.1

Ipoh Barat is a federal constituency in Kinta District, Perak, Malaysia, that has been represented in the Dewan Rakyat, the lower house of national parliament, since 1995.

The constituency was created during the 1994 redistribution and is mandated to return a single member to the Dewan Rakyat under the first-past-the-post voting system. It is one of only two constituencies named after the same city; the other is Ipoh Timor.

== Demographics ==
Ethnic breakdown of Ipoh Barat's electorate as of 2022
1. Chinese (59.2%)
2. Indian (26.3%)
3. Malay (14.0%)
4. Other ethnicities (0.50%)

As of 2020, Ipoh Barat has a population of 134,978 people.

Age breakdown of Ipoh Barat's electorate as of 2022
1. 18–20 (4.29%)
2. 21–29 (16.6%)
3. 30–39 (18.4%)
4. 40–49 (17.0%)
5. 50–59 (16.2%)
6. 60–69 (14.4%)
7. 70–79 (8.76%)
8. 80–89 (3.43%)
9. above 90 (0.89%)
Gender breakdown of Ipoh Barat's electorate as of 2022
1. Male (49.0%)
2. Female (51.0%)

== History ==
=== Polling districts ===
According to the federal gazette issued on 31 October 2022, the Ipoh Barat constituency is divided into 30 polling districts.

State constituency	Polling districts	Code	Location
Bercham（N28）	Bercham Timor	065/28/01	SJK (C) Bercham
Bercham（N28）	Kampong Bercham	065/28/02	SJK (C) Bercham
Bercham（N28）	Dermawan Utara	065/28/03	SMK Bercham
Bercham（N28）	Bercham Selatan	065/28/04	SMK Jalan Tasek
Bercham（N28）	Tasek Dermawan	065/28/05	SK Tasek Dermawan
Bercham（N28）	Tasek	065/28/06	SK Tasek
Bercham（N28）	Kampong Tawas Utara	065/28/07	SJK (C) St Michael & All Angels
Bercham（N28）	Kampong Tawas	065/28/08	SJK (C) Kampung Tawas
Kepayang（N29）	Taman Che Wan	065/29/01	SK Seri Mutiara
Kepayang（N29）	Gurap	065/29/02	SMJK Yuk Choy
Kepayang（N29）	Gunong Lang	065/29/03	SMJK Yuk Choy
Kepayang（N29）	Kepayang Mesjid	065/29/04	SMK Seri Intan
Kepayang（N29）	Star Park	065/29/05	Kolej Tingkatan Enam Seri Putera
Kepayang（N29）	Fair Park	065/29/06	Kolej Tingkatan Enam Seri Putera
Kepayang（N29）	Kampong Pisang	065/29/07	SK Jalan Panglima Bukit Gantang
Kepayang（N29）	Jalan Bijih Timah	065/29/08	SJK (C) Perak
Kepayang（N29）	Jalan Datuk Onn Jaafar	065/29/09	SK Cator Avenue
Kepayang（N29）	Waller Court	065/29/10	SK Coronation Park
Kepayang（N29）	Green Town	065/29/11	SK Sri Kinta
Kepayang（N29）	Jalan Raja Ekram	065/29/12	SJK (C) Sam Tet
Kepayang（N29）	Jalan C.M. Yusof	065/29/13	SJK (C) Ave Maria Convent
Buntong（N30）	Taman Lim	065/30/01	SMK Dr. Megat Khas
Buntong（N30）	Jalan Tun Abdul Razak	065/30/02	SMK Tarcisian Convent
Buntong（N30）	Jalan Silibin	065/30/03	SJK (T) St. Philomena Convent; Kolej Tingkatan Enam Seri Ipoh
Buntong（N30）	Jalan Klian Intan	065/30/04	SJK (C) Guntong
Buntong（N30）	Kampong Baru Buntong	065/30/05	SK Guru Kalgidhar
Buntong（N30）	Jalan Sungai Pari	065/30/06	SJK (T) Kerajaan
Buntong（N30）	Falim	065/30/07	SJK (C) Min Tet
Buntong（N30）	Kampong Kacang Puteh	065/30/08	SJK (T) Methodist; SMK Buntong
Buntong（N30）	Desa Rishah	065/30/09	SK Buntong

=== Representation history ===
Members of Parliament for Ipoh Barat
Parliament	No	Years	Member	Party	Vote Share
Constituency created from Ipoh, Tambun and Pasir Pinji
9th	P062	1995–1999	Ho Cheong Sing (何掌醒)	BN (MCA)	24,616; 55.49%
10th	P062	1999–2004	Ho Cheong Sing (何掌醒)	BN (MCA)	25.155; 53.70%
11th	P065	2004–2008	Kulasegaran Murugeson (மு.குலசேகரன்)	DAP	22,935; 50.66%
12th	P065	2008–2013	Kulasegaran Murugeson (மு.குலசேகரன்)	PR (DAP)	32,576; 65.65%
13th	P065	2013–2015	Kulasegaran Murugeson (மு.குலசேகரன்)	PR (DAP)	45,420; 73.21%
13th	P065	2015–2018	Kulasegaran Murugeson (மு.குலசேகரன்)	PH (DAP)	45,420; 73.21%
14th	P065	2018–2022	Kulasegaran Murugeson (மு.குலசேகரன்)	PH (DAP)	55,613; 84.90%
15th	P065	2022–present	Kulasegaran Murugeson (மு.குலசேகரன்)	PH (DAP)	63,915; 81.57%

=== State constituency ===
Parliamentary constituency	State constituency						
Parliamentary constituency	1955–1959*	1959–1974	1974–1986	1986–1995	1995–2004	2004–2018	2018–present
Ipoh Barat					Bercham		
Ipoh Barat					Buntong		
Ipoh Barat						Kepayang	

=== Historical boundaries ===
State Constituency	Area		
State Constituency	1994	2003	2018
Bercham	Bercham; Gunung Lang; Kampung Seri Kelebang Tambahan; Taman Star; Tasek	Bercham; Dermawan; Taman Ramai; Tasek; Tawas	
Buntong	Buntong; Kampung Chan Thye Lee; Sungai Pari; Taman Eden; Taman Idris		Buntong Jaya; Falim; Kampung Chan Thye Lee; Sungai Pari; Taman Idris
Kepayang		Gunung Lang; Ipoh; Taman Che Wan; Taman Star; Taman Wing Onn	

=== Current state assembly members ===
No.	State Constituency	Member	Coalition (Party)
N28	Bercham	Ong Boon Piow	PH (DAP)
N29	Kepayang	Nga Kor Ming	PH (DAP)
N30	Buntong	Thulsi Thivani Manogaran	PH (DAP)

=== Local governments & postcodes ===
No.	State Constituency	Local Government	Postcode
N28	Bercham	Ipoh City Council	30000, 30010, 30020, 30100, 30250, 30300, 30350, 30450, 30500, 30502, 30503, 31350, 31400 Ipoh
N29	Kepayang	Ipoh City Council	30000, 30010, 30020, 30100, 30250, 30300, 30350, 30450, 30500, 30502, 30503, 31350, 31400 Ipoh
N30	Buntong	Ipoh City Council	30000, 30010, 30020, 30100, 30250, 30300, 30350, 30450, 30500, 30502, 30503, 31350, 31400 Ipoh

== Election results ==
Malaysian general election, 2022: Ipoh Barat
Party	Candidate	Votes	%	∆%
PH	Kulasegaran Murugeson	63,915	81.57	▲81.57
BN	Low Guo Nan	7,248	9.25	▼5.85
PN	Chek Kwong Weng	6,815	8.70	▲8.70
Independent	M. Kayveas	378	0.48	▲0.48
Total valid votes		78,356	100.00	
Total rejected ballots		773		
Unreturned ballots		185		
Turnout		79,314	68.34	▼10.43
Registered electors		114,654		
Majority		56,667	72.32	▲2.45
PH hold		Swing		
Source(s) https://lom.agc.gov.my/ilims/upload/portal/akta/outputp/1753277/PUB610%20PARLIMEN%20PERAK.pdf

Malaysian general election, 2018: Ipoh Barat
Party	Candidate	Votes	%	∆%
PKR	Kulasegaran Murugeson	55,613	84.90	▲84.90
BN	Cheng Wei Yee	9,889	15.10	▼11.31
Total valid votes		65,502	100.00	
Total rejected ballots		878		
Unreturned ballots		472		
Turnout		66,852	78.77	▼2.34
Registered electors		84,874		
Majority		45,724	69.81	▲23.01
PKR hold		Swing		
Source(s) "His Majesty's Government Gazette - Notice of Contested Election, Parliament for the State of Perak [P.U. (B) 237/2018]" (PDF). Attorney General's Chambers of Malaysia. 3 May 2018. "Federal Government Gazette - Results of Contested Election and Statements of the Poll after the Official Addition of Votes, Parliamentary Constituencies for the State of Perak [P.U. (B) 311/2018]" (PDF). Attorney General's Chambers of Malaysia. 28 May 2018.

Malaysian general election, 2013: Ipoh Barat
Party	Candidate	Votes	%	∆%
DAP	Kulasegaran Murugeson	45,420	73.21	▲7.56
BN	Cheng Wei Yee	16,382	26.41	▼7.94
Independent	Kalwant Singh Sujan Singh	235	0.38	▲0.38
Total valid votes		62,037	100.00	
Total rejected ballots		875		
Unreturned ballots		162		
Turnout		63,074	81.11	▲8.52
Registered electors		77,761		
Majority		29,038	46.80	▲15.50
DAP hold		Swing		
Source(s) "Federal Government Gazette - Notice of Contested Election, Parliament for the State of Perak [P.U. (B) 174/2013]" (PDF). Attorney General's Chambers of Malaysia. 26 April 2013. Archived from the original (PDF) on 2019-12-29. "Federal Government Gazette - Results of Contested Election and Statements of the Poll after the Official Addition of Votes, Parliamentary Constituencies for the State of Perak [P.U. (B) 215/2013]" (PDF). Attorney General's Chambers of Malaysia. 22 May 2013.

Malaysian general election, 2008: Ipoh Barat
Party	Candidate	Votes	%	∆%
DAP	Kulasegaran Murugeson	32,576	65.65	▲14.99
BN	Yik Phooi Hong	17,042	34.35	▼14.99
Total valid votes		49,618	100.00	
Total rejected ballots		829		
Unreturned ballots		194		
Turnout		50,641	72.58	▲4.20
Registered electors		69,773		
Majority		15,534	31.30	▲29.98
DAP hold		Swing		

Malaysian general election, 2004: Ipoh Barat
Party	Candidate	Votes	%	∆%
DAP	Kulasegaran Murugeson	22,935	50.66	▲4.82
BN	Ho Cheong Sing	22,337	49.34	▼4.36
Total valid votes		45,272	100.00	
Total rejected ballots		1,015		
Unreturned ballots		481		
Turnout		46,768	68.38	▲0.14
Registered electors		68,394		
Majority		598	1.32	▼6.54
DAP gain from BN		Swing		?

Malaysian general election, 1999: Ipoh Barat
Party	Candidate	Votes	%	∆%
BN	Ho Cheong Sing	25,155	53.70	▼1.79
DAP	Kulasegaran Murugeson	21,477	45.84	▲1.33
MDP	Jaga N. Nathan	215	0.46	▲0.46
Total valid votes		46,847	100.00	
Total rejected ballots		1,016		
Unreturned ballots		833		
Turnout		48,696	68.24	▼0.47
Registered electors		71,359		
Majority		3,678	7.86	▼3.12
BN hold		Swing		

Malaysian general election, 1995: Ipoh Barat
Party	Candidate	Votes	%
BN	Ho Cheong Sing	24,616	55.49
DAP	Teresa Kok Suh Sim	19,747	44.51
Total valid votes		44,363	100.00
Total rejected ballots		1,073	
Unreturned ballots		257	
Turnout		45,693	68.71
Registered electors		66,501	
Majority		4,869	10.98
This was a new constituency created.
