= Choong Shin Heng =

Malaysian politician

Yang Berhormat Tuan Choong Shin Heng AMP MLA
- 钟燊庆

Member of the Perak State Legislative Assembly for Chenderiang
- Incumbent
- Assumed office 19 November 2022
- Preceded by: Ahmad Faizal Azumu (PH–BERSATU)
- Majority: 2,251 (2022)

Personal details
- Born: Choong Shin Heng; 15 July 1981 (age 44) Kinta, Perak, Malaysia
- Citizenship: Malaysian
- Party: Malaysian Chinese Association (MCA)
- Other political affiliations: Barisan Nasional (BN)
- Occupation: Politician

Choong Shin Heng

Chinese name
- Traditional Chinese: 鐘燊慶
- Simplified Chinese: 钟燊庆
Transcriptions
Standard Mandarin
- Hanyu Pinyin: Zhōng Shēnqìng

Choong Shin Heng (simplified Chinese: 钟燊庆; traditional Chinese: 鐘燊慶; pinyin: Zhōng Shēnqìng; born 15 July 1981) is a Malaysian politician who has served as Member of the Perak State Legislative Assembly (MLA) for Chenderiang since November 2022. He is a member of the Malaysian Chinese Association (MCA), a component party of the Barisan Nasional (BN) coalition. He is presently the sole Perak MLA of MCA.

== Election results ==
Perak State Legislative Assembly
Year	Constituency	Candidate	Votes	Pct	Opponent(s)	Votes	Pct	Ballots cast	Majority	Turnout
2018	N47 Chenderiang	Choong Shin Heng (MCA)	7,623	44.79%	Ahmad Faizal Azumu (BERSATU)	7,662	45.02%	17,441	39	77.20%
2018	N47 Chenderiang	Choong Shin Heng (MCA)	7,623	44.79%	Nordin Hassan (PAS)	1,735	10.19%	17,441	39	77.20%
2022	N47 Chenderiang	Choong Shin Heng (MCA)	8,406	39.86%	Atyrah Hanim Razali (PKR)	6,155	29.19%	21,630	2,251	72.09%
2022	N47 Chenderiang	Choong Shin Heng (MCA)	8,406	39.86%	Mohd Yunus Mohd Yusop (BERSATU)	4,862	23.06%	21,630	2,251	72.09%
2022	N47 Chenderiang	Choong Shin Heng (MCA)	8,406	39.86%	Teratai Bah Arom (IND)	1,070	5.07%	21,630	2,251	72.09%
2022	N47 Chenderiang	Choong Shin Heng (MCA)	8,406	39.86%	Azrul Azmi Yaziz (IND)	368	1.75%	21,630	2,251	72.09%
2022	N47 Chenderiang	Choong Shin Heng (MCA)	8,406	39.86%	Mohd Amin Man (PEJUANG)	134	0.64%	21,630	2,251	72.09%
2022	N47 Chenderiang	Choong Shin Heng (MCA)	8,406	39.86%	Ahmad Tarmizi Mohd Ghazali (WARISAN)	93	0.44%	21,630	2,251	72.09%

== Honours ==
- Perak
  - Member of the Order of the Perak State Crown (AMP) (2012)
