= Sivasubramaniam Athinarayanan =

Malaysian politician

Member of the Perak State Legislative Assembly for Buntong
- In office 8 March 2008 – 19 November 2022
- Preceded by: Yik Phooi Hong (BN–MCA)
- Succeeded by: Thulsi Thivani Manogaran (PH–DAP)
- Majority: 2,382 (2008); 8,629 (2013); 15,323 (2018)

Personal details
- Born: Sivasubramaniam a/l Athinarayanan; 28 November 1966 (age 59) Malaysia
- Citizenship: Malaysian
- Party: Democratic Action Party (DAP) (–2020); Independent (March–June 2020); Parti Gerakan Rakyat Malaysia (GERAKAN) (2020–2021); Malaysian United Indigenous Party (BERSATU) (2021–January 2022 & since September 2022); Parti Bangsa Malaysia (PBM) (January–September 2022)
- Other political affiliations: Pakatan Rakyat (PR) (2008–2015); Pakatan Harapan (PH) (2015–2020); Perikatan Nasional (PN) (2021–January 2022 & since September 2022)
- Education: Open University Malaysia (BBA)
- Occupation: Politician

Sivasubramaniam a/l Athinarayanan, also known as A. Sivasubramaniam (born 28 November 1966) is a Malaysian politician who served as Member of the Perak State Legislative Assembly (MLA) for Buntong from March 2008 to November 2022. He is a member of the Malaysian United Indigenous Party (BERSATU), a component party of the Perikatan Nasional (PN) coalition and was a member of the Parti Bangsa Malaysia (PBM), Parti Gerakan Rakyat Malaysia (GERAKAN), another component party of the PN coalition and Democratic Action Party (DAP), a component party of the Pakatan Harapan (PH) coalition as well as an independent. During his tenure as the Buntong MLA, he was involved in multiple political defections and party switchings.

== Education ==
He graduated from the Open University Malaysia with the Bachelor of Business Administration (BBA).

== Politics ==
=== Political defections and party switchings ===
In March 2020, Sivasubramaniam, along with Tronoh MLA Paul Yong Choo Kiong, were removed from the DAP. This occurred after they defected from the party to support the opposing PN coalition, subsequently becoming independent assemblymen.

Following his removal, Sivasubramaniam joined and left several political parties in quick succession:

- June 2020: Joined GERAKAN.
- March 2021: Left GERAKAN and joined BERSATU as an associate member, alongside Paul Yong Choo Kiong.
- January 2022: Left BERSATU and joined PBM.
- September 2022: Left PBM and rejoined BERSATU as an associate member, this time with former Bercham MLA Sum Cheok Leng.

In the 2022 Perak state election, Sivasubramaniam was nominated by PN to defend the Buntong state seat. He suffered a landslide defeat at the hands of Thulsi Thivani Manogaran from PH, and lost his election deposit.

== Election results ==
Perak State Legislative Assembly
Year	Constituency	Candidate	Votes	Pct	Opponent(s)	Votes	Pct	Ballots cast	Majority	Turnout
2004	N30 Buntong	Sivasubramaniam Athinarayanan (DAP)	6,082	41.81%	Yik Phooi Hong (MCA)	8,464	58.19%	14,836	2,382	64.96%
2008	N30 Buntong	Sivasubramaniam Athinarayanan (DAP)	10,311	66.24%	Lee Tung Lai (MCA)	4,996	32.10%	15,566	5,315	70.98%
2013	N30 Buntong	Sivasubramaniam Athinarayanan (DAP)	13,062	71.79%	Sivarraajh Chandran (MIC)	4,433	24.36%	18,195	8,629	79.64%
2013	N30 Buntong	Sivasubramaniam Athinarayanan (DAP)	13,062	71.79%	Iruthiyam Sebastiar Anthonisamy (IND)	312	1.43%	18,195	8,629	79.64%
2013	N30 Buntong	Sivasubramaniam Athinarayanan (DAP)	13,062	71.79%	Mohd Basri Shafie (IND)	127	0.70%	18,195	8,629	79.64%
2018	N30 Buntong	Sivasubramaniam Athinarayanan (DAP)	18,005	80.89%	Thangarani Thiagarajan (MIC)	2,682	12.05%	21,500	15,323	79.80%
2018	N30 Buntong	Sivasubramaniam Athinarayanan (DAP)	18,005	80.89%	Mohanarani Rasiah (PSM)	813	3.65%	21,500	15,323	79.80%
2022	N30 Buntong	Sivasubramaniam Athinarayanan (BERSATU)	1,437	5.64%	Thulsi Thivani Manogaran (DAP)	21,412	84.02%	25,483	19,155	70.33%
2022	N30 Buntong	Sivasubramaniam Athinarayanan (BERSATU)	1,437	5.64%	Jayagopi Subramaniam (MIC)	2,257	8.86%	25,483	19,155	70.33%
2022	N30 Buntong	Sivasubramaniam Athinarayanan (BERSATU)	1,437	5.64%	Iruthiyam Sebastiar Anthonisamy (IND)	237	0.93%	25,483	19,155	70.33%
2022	N30 Buntong	Sivasubramaniam Athinarayanan (BERSATU)	1,437	5.64%	Muhammad Faiz Abdullah (IND)	140	0.55%	25,483	19,155	70.33%
