= Sum Cheok Leng =

Malaysian politician

- 岑卓能

Member of the Perak State Legislative Assembly for Bercham
- In office 8 March 2008 – 5 May 2013
- Preceded by: Gooi Seng Teik (BN–MCA)
- Succeeded by: Cheong Chee Khing (PR–DAP)
- Majority: 6,010 (2008)

Personal details
- Party: Democratic Action Party (DAP) (–2015); Malaysian Islamic Party (PAS) (2015–2022); Malaysian United Indigenous Party (BERSATU) (2022–present)
- Occupation: Politician

Sum Cheok Leng is Malaysian politician who served as Member of Perak State Legislative Assembly (MLA) for Bercham from 2008 to 2013. In August 2015, he announced his departure from DAP and joined Malaysian Islamic Party (PAS) as a member of the PAS Supporters Assembly. In 2022, he joined BERSATU.

== Election results ==
Perak State Legislative Assembly
Year	Constituency	Candidate	Votes	Pct	Opponent(s)	Votes	Pct	Ballots cast	Majority	Turnout
2004	N28 Bercham	Sum Cheok Leng (DAP)	7,603	46.08%	Gooi Seng Teik (MCA)	8,231	49.89%	16,851	628	72.00%
2004	N28 Bercham	Sum Cheok Leng (DAP)	7,603	46.08%	Tan Seng Toh (PKR)	665	4.03%	16,851	628	72.00%
2008	N28 Bercham	Sum Cheok Leng (DAP)	12,848	65.26%	Gooi Seng Teik (MCA)	6,838	34.74%	19,966	6,010	75.10%
