= Chenderiang (state constituency) =

State constituency in Perak, Malaysia

Chenderiang (N47)
Perak constituency

State constituency
- Legislature: Perak State Legislative Assembly
MLA
Choong Shin Heng
BN
- Constituency created: 1974
- First contested: 1974
- Last contested: 2022

Demographics
- Electors (2022): 30,006

Chenderiang is a state constituency in Perak, Malaysia, that has been represented in the Perak State Legislative Assembly. It has been represented by Choong Shin Heng of Barisan Nasional (BN) since 2022.

== Demographics ==
Ethnic breakdown of Chenderiang's electorate as of 2022
1. Malay (34.8%)
2. Chinese (26.5%)
3. Other ethnicities (25.4%)
4. Indian (13.3%)

== History ==
=== Polling districts ===
According to the federal gazette issued on 31 October 2022, the Chenderiang constituency is divided into 17 polling districts.

State constituency	Polling Districts	Code	Location
Chenderiang (N47）	Kuala Woh	072/47/01	SK Bt. 14; SK Pos Musuh LZ
Chenderiang (N47）	Kampong Kinjang	072/47/02	SK Sri Kinjang
Chenderiang (N47）	Pekan Chenderiang	072/47/03	SK Chenderiang
Chenderiang (N47）	Sungai Chenderiang	072/47/04	SJK (C) Chenderiang
Chenderiang (N47）	Temoh	072/47/05	SJK (C) Hwa Min
Chenderiang (N47）	Pekan Temoh	072/47/06	SJK (C) Hwa Min
Chenderiang (N47）	Kampong Lubok Mas	072/47/07	SJK (C) Chenderiang
Chenderiang (N47）	Temoh Road	072/47/08	SK Satu
Chenderiang (N47）	Jalan Pahang	072/47/09	SK Datuk Kelana; SK Kampong Pahang
Chenderiang (N47）	Kampong Datoh	072/47/10	SRA Rakyat Al-Rahmaniah Kg. Datok
Chenderiang (N47）	Kampong Seberang	072/47/11	SK Satu
Chenderiang (N47）	Sungai Sengkuang	072/47/12	SJK (C) Kheung Wa
Chenderiang (N47）	Bidor Road	072/47/13	SJK (C) Kheung Wa
Chenderiang (N47）	Lubok Katak	072/47/14	SK Batu Melintang
Chenderiang (N47）	Kampong Batu Melintang	072/47/15	SK Batu Melintang
Chenderiang (N47）	Bukit Pagar	072/47/16	SJK (C) Bukit Pagar
Chenderiang (N47）	Tanah Mas	072/47/17	SJK (C) Tanah Mas

=== Representation history ===
Members of the Legislative Assembly for Chenderiang
Assembly	No	Years	Name	Party
Constituency created from Tapah Road, Tapah and Kuala Dipang
4th	N32	1974-1978	Munah Lebai Rafar	BN (UMNO)
5th	N32	1978-1982	Abdul Wahab Abu Bakar	BN (UMNO)
6th	N32	1982-1986	Look Kuan @ Look Kok Kong (陸国光)	BN (MCA)
7th	N35	1986-1990	Ong Ka Chuan (黃家泉)	BN (MCA)
8th	N35	1990-1995	Ong Ka Chuan (黃家泉)	BN (MCA)
9th	N40	1995-1999	Ong Ka Chuan (黃家泉)	BN (MCA)
10th	N40	1999-2004	Ong Ka Chuan (黃家泉)	BN (MCA)
11th	N46	2004-2008	Chang Kon You (郑光祖)	BN (MCA)
12th	N46	2008-2013	Mah Hang Soon (马汉顺)	BN (MCA)
13th	N46	2013-2018	Mah Hang Soon (马汉顺)	BN (MCA)
14th	N47	2018-2020	Ahmad Faizal Azumu	PH (BERSATU)
14th	N47	2020-2022	Ahmad Faizal Azumu	PN (BERSATU)
15th	N47	2022–present	Choong Shin Heng (钟燊庆)	BN (MCA)

== Election results ==
Perak state election, 2022
Party	Candidate	Votes	%	∆%
BN	Choong Shin Heng	8,406	39.86	▼5.16
PH	Atyrah Hanim Razali	6,155	29.19	▲29.19
PN	Mohd Yunus Mohd Yusop	4,862	23.06	▲23.06
Independent	Teratai Bah Arom	1,070	5.07	▲5.07
Independent	Azrul Azmi Yaziz	368	1.75	▲1.75
PEJUANG	Mohd Amin Man	134	0.64	▲0.64
Heritage	Ahmad Tarmizi Mohd Ghazali	93	0.44	▲0.44
Total valid votes		21,088	100.00	
Total rejected ballots		505		
Unreturned ballots		37		
Turnout		21,630	72.09	▼5.11
Registered electors		30,006		
Majority		2,251	10.67	▲10.44
BN gain from PKR		Swing		?

Perak state election, 2018
Party	Candidate	Votes	%	∆%
PKR	Ahmad Faizal Azumu	7,662	45.02	▲9.07
BN	Choong Shin Heng	7,623	44.79	▼19.26
PAS	Nordin Hassan	1,735	10.19	▲10.19
Total valid votes		17,020	97.59	
Total rejected ballots		365	2.09	
Unreturned ballots		56	0.32	
Turnout		17,441	77.20	▼3.50
Registered electors		22,591		
Majority		39	0.23	▼27.87
PKR gain from BN		Swing		?
Source(s) "RESULTS OF CONTESTED ELECTION AND STATEMENTS OF THE POLL AFTER THE OFFICIAL ADDITION OF VOTES".

Perak state election, 2013
Party	Candidate	Votes	%	∆%
BN	Mah Hang Soon	10,866	64.05	▼0.69
PKR	Amani Williams-Hunt Abdullah	6,099	35.95	▲0.69
Total valid votes		16,965	96.71	
Total rejected ballots		525	2.99	
Unreturned ballots		52	0.30	
Turnout		17,542	80.70	▲13.74
Registered electors		21,750		
Majority		4,767	28.10	▼1.38
BN hold		Swing		
Source(s) "KEPUTUSAN PILIHAN RAYA UMUM DEWAN UNDANGAN NEGERI". Archived from the original on 2021-04-17.

Perak state election, 2008
Party	Candidate	Votes	%	∆%
BN	Mah Hang Soon	7,451	64.74	▼13.82
PKR	Arjunan A/L Muthu	4,059	35.26	▲13.82
Total valid votes		11,510	95.48	
Total rejected ballots		544	4.51	
Unreturned ballots		1	0.01	
Turnout		12,055	66.96	▲4.12
Registered electors		18,004		
Majority		3,392	29.48	▼27.64
BN hold		Swing		
Source(s) "KEPUTUSAN PILIHAN RAYA UMUM DEWAN UNDANGAN NEGERI PERAK BAGI TAHUN 2008".

Perak state election, 2004
Party	Candidate	Votes	%	∆%
BN	Chang Kon You	8,462	78.56	▲12.06
PKR	Francis A/L Sebastian	2,309	21.44	▲12.06
Total valid votes		10,771	93.58	
Total rejected ballots		636	5.53	
Unreturned ballots		103	0.89	
Turnout		11,510	62.84	▲2.21
Registered electors		18,315		
Majority		6,153	57.12	▲24.12
BN hold		Swing		
Source(s) "KEPUTUSAN PILIHAN RAYA UMUM DEWAN UNDANGAN NEGERI PERAK BAGI TAHUN 2004".

Perak state election, 1999
Party	Candidate	Votes	%	∆%
BN	Ong Ka Chuan	7,168	66.50	▼11.37
PKR	Mahinder Singh	3,611	33.50	▲33.50
Total valid votes		10,779	88.41	
Total rejected ballots		532	4.36	
Unreturned ballots		881	7.22	
Turnout		12,192	60.63	▼1.78
Registered electors		20,109		
Majority		3,392	33.00	▼20.18
BN hold		Swing		
Source(s) "KEPUTUSAN PILIHAN RAYA UMUM DEWAN UNDANGAN NEGERI PERAK BAGI TAHUN 1999".

Perak state election, 1995
Party	Candidate	Votes	%	∆%
BN	Ong Ka Chuan	8,582	77.87	▲5.12
DAP	Harikrishnan A/L Velappan	2,271	24.69	▼2.55
Independent	Foo Koon Yow	168	1.29	▲1.42
Total valid votes		11,021	93.33	
Total rejected ballots		619	5.24	
Unreturned ballots		169	1.43	
Turnout		11,809	62.41	▼4.18
Registered electors		18,921		
Majority		6,311	53.18	▲7.67
BN hold		Swing		
Source(s) "KEPUTUSAN PILIHAN RAYA UMUM DEWAN UNDANGAN NEGERI PERAK BAGI TAHUN 1995".

Perak state election, 1990
Party	Candidate	Votes	%	∆%
BN	Ong Ka Chuan	9,482	72.75	▲5.78
DAP	Selvarajah A/L Ponniah	3,551	27.24	▼5.78
Total valid votes		13,033	93.90	
Total rejected ballots		846	6.10	
Unreturned ballots		0	0	
Turnout		13,879	66.59	▼0.40
Registered electors		20,843		
Majority		5,931	45.51	▲11.57
BN hold		Swing		
Source(s) "KEPUTUSAN PILIHAN RAYA UMUM DEWAN UNDANGAN NEGERI PERAK BAGI TAHUN 1990".

Perak state election, 1986
Party	Candidate	Votes	%	∆%
BN	Ong Ka Chuan	7,754	66.97	▼8.39
DAP	Aw Too Yen @ Aw Yong Pan	3,825	33.03	▲8.39
Total valid votes		11,579	100.00	
Total rejected ballots		615		
Unreturned ballots		0		
Turnout		12,194	66.99	▼7.36
Registered electors		18,203		
Majority		3,929	33.93	▼16.77
BN hold		Swing		
Source(s) "KEPUTUSAN PILIHAN RAYA UMUM DEWAN UNDANGAN NEGERI PERAK BAGI TAHUN 1986".

Perak state election, 1982
Party	Candidate	Votes	%	∆%
BN	Look Kuan	7,148	75.35	▲75.35
DAP	Udin Said	2,338	24.65	▼8.83
Total valid votes		9,486	100.00	
Total rejected ballots		473		
Unreturned ballots		0		
Turnout		9,959	74.35	▼1.46
Registered electors		13,395		
Majority		4,810	50.71	▲17.67
BN hold		Swing		

Perak state election, 1978
Party	Candidate	Votes	%	∆%
BN	Abdul Wahab Abu Bakar	5,706	66.52	▲5.38
DAP	Kalimuthu Ranggayah	2,872	33.48	▼5.38
Total valid votes		8,578	100.00	
Total rejected ballots		374		
Unreturned ballots		0		
Turnout		8,952	75.81	▲0.96
Registered electors		11,808		
Majority		2,834	33.04	▲10.77
BN hold		Swing		

Perak state election, 1974
Party	Candidate	Votes	%
BN	Munah Lebai Abdul Raffar	4,255	61.14
DAP	Ibrahim Singgeh	2,705	38.86
Total valid votes		6,960	100.00
Total rejected ballots		713	
Unreturned ballots		0	
Turnout		7,673	74.85
Registered electors		10,251	
Majority		1,550	22.27
This was a new constituency created.
