= Abdul Aziz Bari =

Malaysian politician, academic, professor and lecturer

Yang Berhormat Dr. Abdul Aziz Bari MLA
- عبد العزيز باري

State Leader of the Opposition of Perak
- In office 9 May 2020 – 21 November 2022
- Monarch: Nazrin Shah
- Menteri Besar: Ahmad Faizal Azumu (May–December 2020); Saarani Mohamad (2020–2022)
- Preceded by: Saarani Mohamad
- Succeeded by: Razman Zakaria
- Constituency: Tebing Tinggi

Member of the Perak State Legislative Assembly for Tebing Tinggi
- Incumbent
- Assumed office 9 May 2018
- Preceded by: Ong Boon Piow (PH–DAP)
- Majority: 3,927 (2018); 660 (2022)

Member of the Perak State Executive Council
- 2018–2020: Chairman of the Education, Science, Environment, Green Technology and Information

Personal details
- Born: Abdul Aziz bin Bari; 22 August 1959 (age 67) Sabak Bernam, Selangor, Federation of Malaya (now Malaysia)
- Party: People's Justice Party (PKR) (2013–2015); Democratic Action Party (DAP) (since 2015)
- Other political affiliations: Pakatan Rakyat (PR) (2013–2015); Pakatan Harapan (PH) (since 2015)
- Education: Universiti Teknologi MARA (DPA); International Islamic University Malaysia (LLB); University of Nottingham (LLM); University of Birmingham (PhD)
- Occupation: Politician
- Profession: Academic; professor; lecturer
- Website: Abdul Aziz Bari on Facebook

Abdul Aziz Bari (born 22 August 1959) is a Malaysian politician, academic, professor and lecturer who has served as Member of the Perak State Legislative Assembly (MLA) for Tebing Tinggi since May 2018. He served as State Leader of the Opposition of Perak from May 2020 to November 2022 and Member of the Perak State Executive Council (EXCO) in the Pakatan Harapan (PH) state administration under former Menteri Besar Ahmad Faizal Azumu from May 2018 to the collapse of the PH state administration in March 2020. He is a member and State Vice Chairman of Perak of the Democratic Action Party (DAP), a component party of the PH coalition and was a member of the People's Justice Party (PKR), a component party of formerly the Pakatan Rakyat (PR) coalition.

== Background ==
Aziz was born in Sabak Bernam and resides in Bandar Baru Selayang, Selangor.

== Professional career ==
Aziz is a former member of academia and lecturer in the field of law. He served in the International Islamic University Malaysia (IIUM) as well as University of Selangor (UNISEL). He is notable in Malaysian monarchy and constitutional law.

Whilst serving as a lecturer in IIUM he was suspended for his observations on statements of the Sultan of Selangor in a much controversial publicised action by Muslim religious authorities against a Methodist church for proselytization. He was also a subject of investigation by authorities when he commented on the appointment of the Selangor Chief Minister being a prerogative of the Sultan of Selangor whilst still serving as a lecturer in UNISEL.

== Politics ==
Aziz for the first time stood in the 2013 general election (GE13) as People's Justice Party (PKR) candidate for the Sabak Bernam parliamentary seat contesting against Mohd Fasiah Fakeh from United Malays National Organisation (UMNO) of Barisan Nasional (BN). He lost by 1644 votes from the 31,697 polled.

He subsequently revived his political ambitions by joining the Democratic Action Party (DAP) in 2015. He stood as a candidate in the Perak state assembly seat of Tebing Tinggi in the 2018 general election (GE14). He won the seat against Malaysian Chinese Association (MCA)'s Khoo Boon Chuan and Pan-Malaysian Islamic Party (PAS)'s Mazlan Md Isa with a majority of 3,927 votes against the closest challenger Khoo. He retained the seat and was reelected as the Tebing Tinggi MLA with a smaller majority of only 660 votes in the 2022 Perak state election.

Aziz was appointed the EXCO Chairman for Education, Environment, Green Technology & Information in the Pakatan Harapan (PH) new state government until its collapse due to the political crisis in 2020. On 9 May 2020, he was chosen as the new Opposition Leader of Perak.

He relinquished the position following the return of PH to the state government of Perak on 21 November 2022 following the 2022 Perak state election. He was replaced by Razman Zakaria, Gunong Semanggol MLA from Perikatan Nasional (PN) that became the new state opposition coalition after the formation of the Barisan Nasional (BN) and PH state coalition government.

== Controversies and issues ==
=== Views and observations ===
Aziz is often quoted based on his knowledge of the law, but he has also been known to give his personal opinion on matters, including quotes that often put him at odds with religious movements and leaders. In the leadup to the GE14, he publicly stated that PAS should not even dream of being in government. In 2015, he commented that the Crown Prince of Johor, Tunku Ismail Idris should be investigated on charges of sedition, responding to social media posting by the Crown Prince on Johor's right to separate from Malaysia.

None was as controversial as his earlier comments in 2011, when he commented on the Sultan of Selangor's defense of Muslim religious officials raiding a Methodist church. That resulted in his suspension as a law lecturer in IIUM, and then reinstatement upon widespread protests by students. However, he subsequently chose to resign from his position at IIUM.

His outspoken views also often put him in trouble with the law, and he was probed further for illegal assembly in 2014 as well as a sedition probe. His comments on the right to criticise the monarchy remain one of his most controversial statements.

=== Suspension from work ===
On 20 October 2011, Aziz was issued a show cause letter by IIUM and suspended from work 'to facilitate investigations' as announced by the rector of IIUM, Zaleha Kamaruddin. She also clarified that his suspension was not without pay, and his rights to associate himself with the faculty remained open despite rumours against it. In the course of his suspension, other politicians clamoured for his resignation, including Member of Parliament (MP) of Kulim-Bandar Baharu, Zulkifli Noordin, which resulted in a lawsuit against the MP and the Malay newspaper Utusan Malaysia by Aziz.

His main contention and comments that under the Sedition Act 1948 saying that the rights in the constitution allows anyone to criticize the monarchy, and that the right cannot be denied.

=== Sedition probe ===
While lecturing in UNISEL, Aziz was probed for sedition arising from an online newsportal report Sultan Selangor terikat Deklarasi 1992, perlu lantik Wan Azizah, kata Aziz Bari and Only God, not Sultan, has absolute powers. This resulted in almost 100 police reports made against Aziz, and he was then investigated by the police. He responded by remaining silent during investigations.

=== Vote of no confidence against Menteri Besar of Perak (purported) ===
This purportedly arose from underlying currents in the 14th State Assembly sitting of the Perak State Legislative Assembly, which Kota Tampan State Assemblyman Saarani Mohamad referred to when he made a statement to the media that the MB of the seating Ahmad Faizal Azumu would face a vote of no confidence led by State EXCO member Aziz Bari. DAP MP for Batu Gajah Sivakumar Varatharaju, in a response to the initial media statement, lodged a police report citing the Malaysian Penal Code at the Dang Wangi Police Station. Other responses included one from fellow Perak State EXCO member Sivanesan Achalingam who claimed that UMNO was 'daydreaming'. With one day to the end of the 4th meeting of the 14th session of the state assembly, Aziz denied the claims by stating that he would never have achieved anything, citing only getting 18 votes of support from his party, whereas as claimed, another further five from UMNO and would still be short seven votes. The talk of the purported vote of no confidence first emerged in mid-August when State Public Accounts Committee Chairman Abdul Yunus Jamahri publicly stated that it was mere speculation by the opposition.

== Election results ==
Parliament of Malaysia
| Year | Constituency | Candidate | Votes | Pct | Opponent(s) | Votes | Pct | Ballots cast | Majority | Turnout |
|---|---|---|---|---|---|---|---|---|---|---|
| 2013 | P092 Sabak Bernam | Abdul Aziz Bari (PKR) | 14,620 | 46.96% | Mohd Fasiah Mohd Fakeh (UMNO) | 16,510 | 53.04% | 31,859 | 1,890 | 85.37% |

Perak State Legislative Assembly
| Year | Constituency | Candidate | Votes | Pct | Opponent(s) | Votes | Pct | Ballots cast | Majority | Turnout |
|---|---|---|---|---|---|---|---|---|---|---|
| 2018 | N26 Tebing Tinggi | Abdul Aziz Bari (DAP) | 10,334 | 49.99% | Tony Khoo Boon Chuan (MCA) | 6,407 | 30.99% | 21,094 | 3,927 | 81.00% |
| 2018 | N26 Tebing Tinggi | Abdul Aziz Bari (DAP) | 10,334 | 49.99% | Mazlan Md Isa (PAS) | 3,931 | 19.02% | 21,094 | 3,927 | 81.00% |
| 2022 | N26 Tebing Tinggi | Abdul Aziz Bari (DAP) | 11,286 | 40.58% | Mohammad Iskandar Abdul Rahman (BERSATU) | 10,626 | 38.21% | 27,811 | 660 | 74.71% |
| 2022 | N26 Tebing Tinggi | Abdul Aziz Bari (DAP) | 11,286 | 40.58% | Tony Khoo Boon Chuan (MCA) | 5,705 | 20.51% | 27,811 | 660 | 74.71% |
| 2022 | N26 Tebing Tinggi | Abdul Aziz Bari (DAP) | 11,286 | 40.58% | Mior Haidir (PEJUANG) | 194 | 0.70% | 27,811 | 660 | 74.71% |
