= Ahmad Faizal Azumu =

Malaysian politician

Yang Berbahagia Dato' Seri Ahmad Faizal Azumu SPMP AMP
- أحمد فيصل ازومو
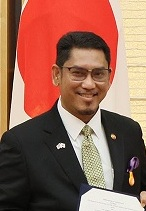
- Faizal in 2022

Minister of Youth and Sports
- In office 30 August 2021 – 24 November 2022
- Monarch: Abdullah
- Prime Minister: Ismail Sabri Yaakob
- Deputy: Ti Lian Ker
- Preceded by: Reezal Merican Naina Merican
- Succeeded by: Hannah Yeoh Tseow Suan
- Constituency: Tambun

Special Advisor to the Prime Minister
- In office 5 August 2021 – 16 August 2021
- Monarch: Abdullah
- Prime Minister: Muhyiddin Yassin
- Preceded by: Position established
- Succeeded by: Position abolished

12th and 13th Menteri Besar of Perak
- In office 13 March 2020 – 5 December 2020
- Monarch: Nazrin Shah
- Preceded by: Himself
- Succeeded by: Saarani Mohamad
- Constituency: Chenderiang
- In office 12 May 2018 – 10 March 2020
- Monarch: Nazrin Shah
- Preceded by: Zambry Abdul Kadir
- Succeeded by: Himself
- Constituency: Chenderiang

Vice President of the Malaysian United Indigenous Party
- Incumbent
- Assumed office 4 November 2024 Serving with Radzi Jidin & Ronald Kiandee
- President: Muhyiddin Yassin
- Preceded by: Mohd Rafiq Naizamohideen

2nd Deputy President of the Malaysian United Indigenous Party
- In office 23 August 2020 – 4 November 2024
- President: Muhyiddin Yassin
- Preceded by: Mukhriz Mahathir
- Succeeded by: Hamzah Zainudin

2nd Information Chief of Perikatan Nasional
- In office 9 December 2024 – April 2025
- Chairman: Muhyiddin Yassin
- Preceded by: Mohamed Azmin Ali
- Succeeded by: Mohd Radzi Md Jidin

2nd State Chairman of the Perikatan Nasional of Negeri Sembilan
- In office 31 May 2023 – 12 February 2024
- Deputy: Rafiei Mustapha
- National Chairman: Muhyiddin Yassin
- Preceded by: Eddin Syazlee Shith
- Succeeded by: Mohamad Hanifah Abu Baker

2nd State Chairman of the Malaysian United Indigenous Party of Negeri Sembilan
- In office 31 May 2023 – 28 January 2024
- President: Muhyiddin Yassin
- Preceded by: Eddin Syazlee Shith
- Succeeded by: Mohamad Hanifah Abu Baker

Member of the Malaysian Parliament for Tambun
- In office 9 May 2018 – 19 November 2022
- Preceded by: Ahmad Husni Hanadzlah (BN–UMNO)
- Succeeded by: Anwar Ibrahim (PH–PKR)
- Majority: 5,320 (2018)

Member of the Perak State Legislative Assembly for Chenderiang
- In office 9 May 2018 – 19 November 2022
- Preceded by: Mah Hang Soon (BN–MCA)
- Succeeded by: Choong Shin Heng (BN–MCA)
- Majority: 39 (2018)

Faction represented in Dewan Rakyat
- 2018–2020: Pakatan Harapan
- 2020: Malaysian United Indigenous Party
- 2020–2022: Perikatan Nasional

Faction represented in Perak State Legislative Assembly
- 2018–2020: Pakatan Harapan
- 2020: Malaysian United Indigenous Party
- 2020–2022: Perikatan Nasional

Personal details
- Born: Ahmad Faizal bin Azumu; 10 June 1970 (age 56) Ipoh, Perak, Malaysia
- Citizenship: Malaysian
- Party: United Malays National Organisation (UMNO) (until 2017); Malaysian United Indigenous Party (BERSATU) (since 2017)
- Other political affiliations: Barisan Nasional (BN) (until 2017); Pakatan Harapan (PH) (2017–2020); Perikatan Nasional (PN) (since 2020)
- Relations: Nolee Ashilin Mohamed Radzi (sister-in-law)
- Education: Edith Cowan University (ungraduated)
- Occupation: Politician
- Profession: Businessman
- Other names: Peja
- Website: Ahmad Faizal Azumu on Facebook

Ahmad Faizal bin Azumu (Jawi: أحمد فيصل بن ازومو; born 10 June 1970), nicknamed Peja, is a Malaysian politician who served as the Minister of Youth and Sports in the Barisan Nasional (BN) administration under former Prime Minister Ismail Sabri Yaakob from August 2021 to the collapse of the BN administration in November 2022, Special Advisor to the Prime Minister Muhyiddin Yassin in the Perikatan Nasional (PN) administration in August 2021, 12th and 13th Menteri Besar of Perak from May 2018 to his first resignation in March 2020 and again from March 2020 to his second resignation in December 2020. He also served as the Member of Parliament (MP) for Tambun and Member of the Perak State Legislative Assembly (MLA) for Chenderiang from May 2018 to November 2022. He is a member and State Chairman of Perak and Pahang of the Malaysian United Indigenous Party (BERSATU), a component party of the PN and formerly Pakatan Harapan (PH) coalitions. He has served as the 2nd Information Chief of PN since December 2024 and Vice President of BERSATU since November 2024. He also served as the 2nd Deputy President of BERSATU from August 2020 to November 2024 and 2nd State Chairman of PN and BERSATU of Negeri Sembilan from May 2023 to February and January 2024 respectively. He was also the State Chairman of PH of Perak. He was one of the only two state leaders of Malaysia who has led state administrations of two different and opposing political coalitions alongside Mukhriz Mahathir.

He was removed from office of the Menteri Besar of Perak after losing the motion of the 2020 vote of no confidence in the Perak State Legislative Assembly on 4 December, and he served in caretaker capacity for another day despite his intention to only resign once the appointment of a new officeholder and formation of a new state administration take place.

== Early life ==
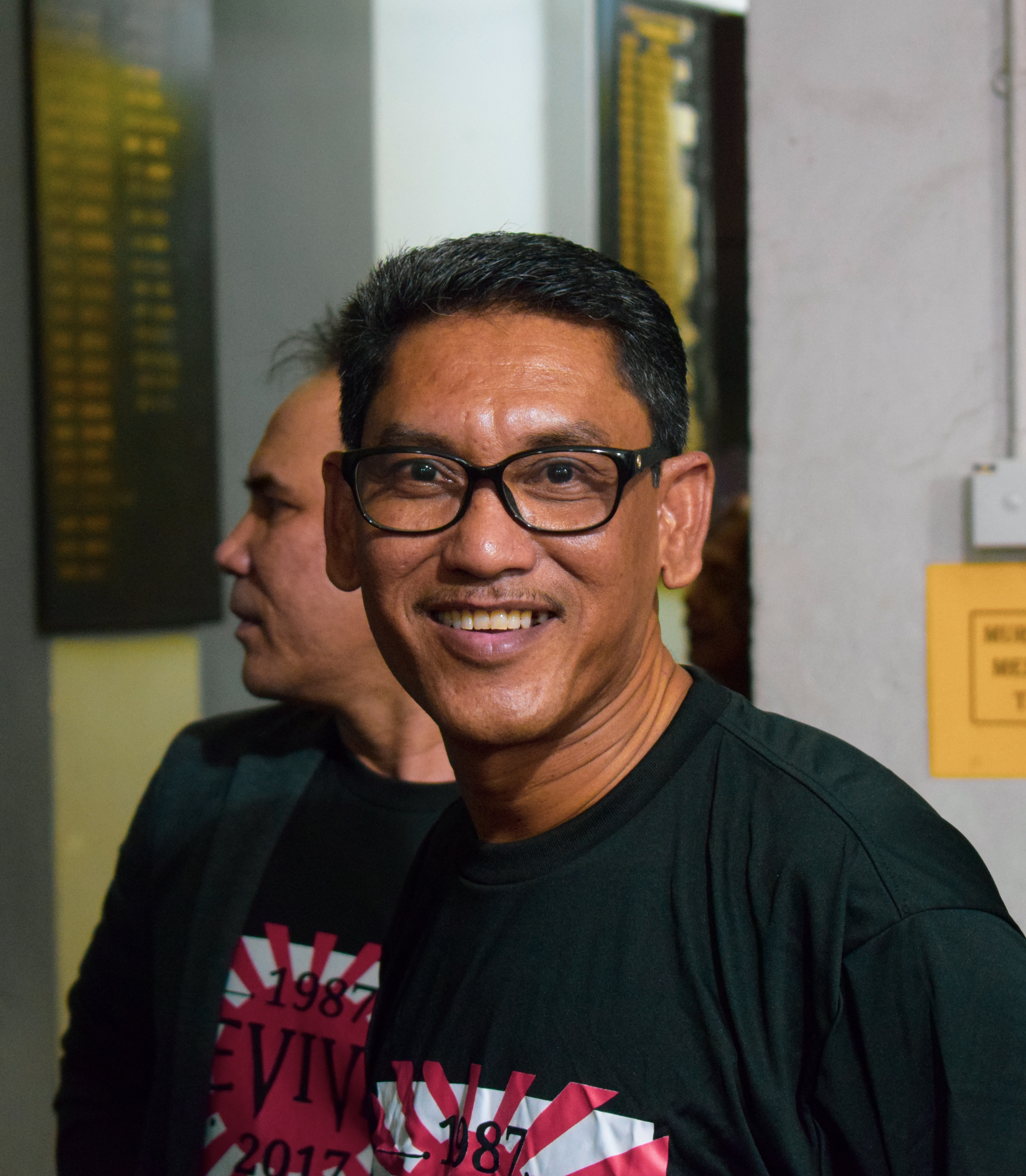
Ahmad Faizal in 2018.

Ahmad Faizal was born in Ipoh, Perak. He received his primary education at Cator Avenue School, Ipoh and had his secondary education at Anderson School, Ipoh.

== Political career ==
He began his political career as a Special Officer to Health Minister Liow Tiong Lai between 2011 and 2013 before becoming Senior Special Officer to Kedah Mentri Besar Mukhriz Mahathir between 2013 and 2016. He also formerly served in the Special Affairs Department (JASA).

He was the former United Malays National Organisation (UMNO) Ipoh Barat Youth chief (2016–2017) before he became Perak BERSATU chairman. He was subsequently named Perak Pakatan Harapan chairman in August 2017. He was appointed Special Advisor to the Prime Minister Muhyiddin Yassin on 5 August 2021, who is in charge of advising Muhyiddin on matters related to community networking, community communications and socioeconomic development.

On 30 December 2025, Ahmad Faizal announced his resignation as the Perak PN chief of Perikatan Nasional (PN), following the resignation of PN president Muhyiddin Yassin.

== Controversies ==
Ahmad Faizal was reported to have pursued a Business Studies degree from Edith Cowan University in Perth, Australia. He however denied the reports and claimed that while he did pursue the course he had to put his studies on hold for personal reasons. Ahmad Faizal holds a master's degree in political science from Universiti Teknologi Malaysia.

Ahmad Faizal has been very critical of the Orang Asli indigenous tribes ever since he took office as Menteri Besar. On 23 November 2018, Ahmad Faizal made a statement that the Orang Asli should improve themselves before asking for aid. On 29 July 2019, Ahmad Faizal claimed that there is no definition or recognition of ancestral or customary land (tanah adat) for Orang Asli under the state constitution. It was refuted by fellow PH's MP, Ramkarpal Singh and the Malaysian Bar. During his administration, many Orang Asli residents were arrested for protesting over the state government's decision to acquire their land for logging activities.

As special advisor to Prime Minister Muhyiddin Yassin, he faced brickbats from netizens for his apathy in the middle of the COVID-19 pandemic, when he posted a food review in his office. Some questioned his appointment as special advisor in a time when the government was struggling with bloated spending to handle COVID-19 and political instability.

On 13 June 2022, he made a statement on Twitter about Malaysian football supporters due to the Malaysian football team losing against Bahrain in Bukit Jalil National Stadium, causing a backlash from supporters. He later apologized.

== Filmography ==
=== Drama ===
Year	Title	Role	TV channels	Notes
2022	Ratu Ten Pin 2	Pak Peja	Astro Ria	Special Appearances in Drama Ratu Ten Pin 2

Discography

- Moh Perak Ke Kita (Moh Beraya) ft Shiha Zikir and Dato Jamal Abdillah

== Personal life ==
He is married to Dr Nomee Ashikin Mohammed Radzi and has two children. His sister-in-law who is Dr Nomee's younger sister; Nolee Ashilin Mohamed Radzi is the UMNO turned independent and later hopped to BERSATU Tulang Sekah constituency MLA since 2008.

== Election results ==
Parliament of Malaysia
Year	Constituency	Candidate	Votes	Pct	Opponent(s)	Votes	Pct	Ballots cast	Majority	Turnout
2018	P063 Tambun	Ahmad Faizal Azumu (BERSATU)	38,661	44.46%	Ahmad Husni Hanadzlah (UMNO)	33,341	38.35%	88,920	5,320	82.51%
2018	P063 Tambun	Ahmad Faizal Azumu (BERSATU)	38,661	44.46%	Muhd Zulkifli Mohd Zakaria (PAS)	14,948	17.19%	88,920	5,320	82.51%
2022	P063 Tambun	Ahmad Faizal Azumu (BERSATU)	45,889	36.78%	Anwar Ibrahim (PKR)	49,625	39.77%	126,444	3,736	77.71%
2022	P063 Tambun	Ahmad Faizal Azumu (BERSATU)	45,889	36.78%	Aminuddin Md Hanafiah (UMNO)	28,140	22.55%	126,444	3,736	77.71%
2022	P063 Tambun	Ahmad Faizal Azumu (BERSATU)	45,889	36.78%	Abdul Rahim Tahir (PEJUANG)	1,115	0.89%	126,444	3,736	77.71%

Perak State Legislative Assembly
Year	Constituency	Candidate	Votes	Pct	Opponent(s)	Votes	Pct	Ballots cast	Majority	Turnout
2018	N47 Chenderiang	Ahmad Faizal Azumu (BERSATU)	7,662	33.90%	Choong Shin Heng (MCA)	7,623	33.70%	17,441	39	77.20%
2018	N47 Chenderiang	Ahmad Faizal Azumu (BERSATU)	7,662	33.90%	Nordin Hassan (PAS)	1,735	7.70%	17,441	39	77.20%

== Honours ==
=== Honours of Malaysia ===
- Perak
  - Knight Grand Commander of the Order of the Perak State Crown (SPMP) – Dato' Seri (2018)
  - Member of the Order of the Perak State Crown (AMP) (2007)

== See also ==
- 2020 vote of no confidence in the Faizal Azumu ministry

Political offices
Preceded by Dr. Zambry Abdul Kadir	Menteri Besar of Perak; 2018–2020	Succeeded by Saarani Mohammad
