= Ong Boon Piow =

Malaysian politician

Yang Berhormat Tuan Ong Boon Piow MLA
- 黄文标

Member of the Perak State Legislative Assembly for Bercham
- Incumbent
- Assumed office 9 May 2018
- Preceded by: Cheong Chee Khing (PR–DAP)
- Majority: 20,709 (2018); 26,114 (2022)

Member of the Perak State Legislative Assembly for Tebing Tinggi
- In office 8 March 2008 – 9 May 2018
- Preceded by: Chew Wai Khoon (BN–MCA)
- Succeeded by: Abdul Aziz Bari (PH–DAP)
- Majority: 2,515 (2008); 5,887 (2013)

Personal details
- Born: Ong Boon Piow; 11 May 1979 (age 47) Malaysia
- Citizenship: Malaysian
- Party: Democratic Action Party (DAP) (since 2005)
- Other political affiliations: Pakatan Rakyat (PR) (2008–2015); Pakatan Harapan (PH) (since 2015)
- Education: University of Putra Malaysia (UPM) (Bachelor of Mechanical Engineering)
- Occupation: Politician

Ong Boon Piow

Chinese name
- Traditional Chinese: 黃文標
- Simplified Chinese: 黄文标
- Hanyu Pinyin: Huáng Wénbiāo
- Pha̍k-fa-sṳ: Vòng Vùn-phiâu
- Jyutping: Wong4 Man4 Biu1
- Hokkien POJ: N̂g Bûn-piau
- Tâi-lô: N̂g Bûn-piau

Ong Boon Piow (simplified Chinese: 黄文标; traditional Chinese: 黃文標; pinyin: Huáng Wénbiāo; Jyutping: Wong4 Man4 Biu1; Pe̍h-ōe-jī: N̂g Bûn-piau; Pha̍k-fa-sṳ: Vòng Vùn-phiâu; born 11 May 1979) is a Malaysian politician who has served as Member of the Perak State Legislative Assembly (MLA) for Bercham since May 2018. He served as the MLA for Tebing Tinggi from March 2008 to May 2018. He is a member of the Democratic Action Party (DAP), a component party of the Pakatan Harapan (PH) and formerly Pakatan Rakyat (PR) coalitions.

== Early career ==
He is also an insurance agent and a design engineer. He is a Bachelor of Mechanical Engineering from University of Putra Malaysia.

== Politics ==
He had joined DAP in 2005.

== Election results ==
Perak State Legislative Assembly
Year	Constituency	Candidate	Votes	Pct	Opponent(s)	Votes	Pct	Ballots cast	Majority	Turnout
2008	N26 Tebing Tinggi	Ong Boon Piow (DAP)	7,197	59.42%	Chew Wai Khoon (MCA)	4,682	38.66%	12,112	2,515	67.01%
2013	N26 Tebing Tinggi	Ong Boon Piow (DAP)	10,131	69.10%	Tony Khoo Boon Chuan (MCA)	4,244	28.95%	14,662	5,887	77.10%
2018	N28 Bercham	Ong Boon Piow (DAP)	24,647	84.88%	Low Guo Nan (MCA)	3,938	13.56%	29,039	20,709	80.29%
2022	N28 Bercham	Ong Boon Piow (DAP)	29,596	81.24%	Albert Ho Wai Mun (MCA)	3,482	9.56%	37,143	26,114	69.74%
2022	N28 Bercham	Ong Boon Piow (DAP)	29,596	81.24%	Lim Jin Sheng (Gerakan)	3,351	9.20%	37,143	26,114	69.74%

== See also ==
- Tebing Tinggi (state constituency)
- Bercham (state constituency)
