= Thulsi Thivani Manogaran =

Malaysian politician and lawyer

Yang Berhormat Puan Thulsi Thivani Manogaran MLA

State Assistant Publicity Secretary of the Democratic Action Party of Perak
- Incumbent
- Assumed office 8 September 2024
- Secretary-General: Anthony Loke Siew Fook
- State Chairman: Nga Kor Ming
- State Publicity Secretary: Woo Kah Leong
- Preceded by: Jenny Choy Tsi Jen

Women Assistant Organising Secretary of the Democratic Action Party
- Incumbent
- Assumed office 9 September 2023
- Secretary-General: Anthony Loke Siew Fook
- Women Chief: Teo Nie Ching
- Women Organising Secretary: Liow Cai Tung

Member of the Perak State Legislative Assembly for Buntong
- Incumbent
- Assumed office 19 November 2022
- Preceded by: Sivasubramaniam Athinarayanan (PH–DAP)
- Majority: 19,155 (2022)

Personal details
- Born: Thulsi Thivani d/o Manogaran; 9 November 1988 (age 37) Kuala Lumpur, Malaysia
- Citizenship: Malaysian
- Party: Democratic Action Party (DAP)
- Other political affiliations: Pakatan Harapan (PH)
- Relations: 1 younger brother; 2 younger sisters
- Parent: Manogaran Marimuthu (father)
- Education: University of Malaya (LLB)
- Occupation: Politician
- Profession: Lawyer

Thulsi Thivani d/o Manogaran (born 9 November 1988) is a Malaysian politician and lawyer who has served as Member of the Perak State Legislative Assembly (MLA) for Buntong since November 2022. She is a member, Women Assistant Publicity Secretary and was the State Youth Head of Legal Bureau of Perak of the Democratic Action Party (DAP), a component party of the Pakatan Harapan (PH) coalition. She has also served as the State Assistant Publicity Secretary of DAP of Perak since September 2024 and Women Assistant Organising Secretary of DAP since September 2023. She is also the eldest child and daughter of Manogaran Marimuthu, the State Deputy Chairman of DAP of Pahang, former Member of Parliament (MP) for Teluk Intan and a co-founder of the Tamil Foundation of Malaysia.

== Family, education and career ==
Thulsi Thivani was born to Manogaran as his eldest child and daughter in Malaysia in 1989. She also has three younger siblings, a brother and two sisters. She has followed her father in volunteer work, events and parades since young. She is talented in languages and an excellent student. She is also able to speak the Chinese dialect Cantonese. She graduated from the University of Malaya (UM) with the Bachelor of Laws (LLB). After graduating, she stayed in Kuala Lumpur for her career, working together with non-governmental organisations (NGOs) in human rights to promote the freedom of speech in Malaysia. A year prior to her election as the Buntong MLA, she received calls from DAP as the party needed legal experts to serve the people. She resigned from her well-paid and prominent position and left Kuala Lumpur for Ipoh to serve the party and the people.

== Political career ==
=== Member of the Perak State Legislative Assembly (since 2022) ===
==== 2022 Perak state election ====
In the 2022 Perak state election, Thulsi Thivani made her electoral debut after being nominated by PH to contest the Buntong state seat. Thulsi Thivani won the seat and was elected to the Perak State Legislative Assembly as the Buntong MLA for the first term after defeating Jayagopi Subramaniam of Barisan Nasional (BN), incumbent and defending Buntong MLA Sivasubramaniam Athinarayanan of Perikatan Nasional (PN) who was contesting the seat for the fifth time and independent candidates Iruthiyam Sebastiar Anthonisamy as well as Muhammad Faiz Abdullah by a majority of 19,155 votes in a landslide victory.

As the Buntong MLA, Thulsi Thivani promised to improve the infrastructure in Buntong.

== Election results ==
Perak State Legislative Assembly
Year	Constituency	Candidate	Votes	Pct	Opponent(s)	Votes	Pct	Ballots cast	Majority	Turnout
2022	N30 Buntong	Thulsi Thivani Manogaran (DAP)	21,412	84.02%	Jayagopi Subramaniam (MIC)	2,257	8.86%	25,483	19,155	69.41%
2022	N30 Buntong	Thulsi Thivani Manogaran (DAP)	21,412	84.02%	Sivasubramaniam Athinarayanan (BERSATU)	1,437	5.64%	25,483	19,155	69.41%
2022	N30 Buntong	Thulsi Thivani Manogaran (DAP)	21,412	84.02%	Iruthiyam Sebastiar Anthonisamy (IND)	237	0.93%	25,483	19,155	69.41%
2022	N30 Buntong	Thulsi Thivani Manogaran (DAP)	21,412	84.02%	Muhammad Faiz Abdullah (IND)	140	0.55%	25,483	19,155	69.41%
