= Tebing Tinggi (state constituency) =

Political subdivision in Malaysia

Tebing Tinggi (N26)
Perak constituency

State constituency
- Legislature: Perak State Legislative Assembly
MLA
Abdul Aziz Bari
PH
- Constituency created: 1984
- First contested: 1986
- Last contested: 2022

Demographics
- Electors (2022): 37,223

Tebing Tinggi is a state constituency in Perak, Malaysia, that has been represented in the Perak State Legislative Assembly.

== Demographics ==
Ethnic breakdown of Tebing Tinggi's electorate as of 2022
1. Malay (57.7%)
2. Chinese (31.6%)
3. Indian (9.42%)
4. Other ethnicities (1.24%)

== History ==
=== Polling districts ===
According to the federal gazette issued on 31 October 2022, the Tebing Tinggi constituency is divided into 12 polling districts.

State constituency	Polling districts	Code	Location
Tebing Tinggi（N26）	Jalan Dato Maharaja Lela	064/26/01	SMK St. Michael
Tebing Tinggi（N26）	Jalan Sultan Yusof	064/26/02	SMK Methodist (ACS)
Tebing Tinggi（N26）	Jalan Tun Perak	064/26/03	SK Dato' Panglima Kinta
Tebing Tinggi（N26）	Sungai Kinta	064/26/04	SK Kuala Pari
Tebing Tinggi（N26）	Tebing Sungai Kinta	064/26/05	SJK (C) Chung San
Tebing Tinggi（N26）	Kampong Paloh	064/26/06	Tadika Chung Shan
Tebing Tinggi（N26）	Tebing Tinggi	064/26/07	SJK (C) Chung San
Tebing Tinggi（N26）	Kuala Pari Hilir	064/26/08	SK Kuala Pari
Tebing Tinggi（N26）	Kampong Seri Kinta	064/26/09	SRA Rakyat Al Rashidiah; SRA Rakyat At-Tolabiah
Tebing Tinggi（N26）	Pengkalan Barat	064/26/10	SMK Kg. Pasir Puteh; SRA Rakyat An Najmi
Tebing Tinggi（N26）	Pengkalan Gate	064/26/11	SMK Lahat
Tebing Tinggi（N26）	Pengkalan Pegoh	064/26/12	SK Pengkalan Pegoh; SRA Rakyat Al Rahmaniah Taman Desa Aman; SRA Rakyat Ikhwaniah

=== Representation history ===
Members of the Legislative Assembly for Tebing Tinggi
Assembly	No	Years	Name	Party
Constituency created from Kepayang, Chemor, Pasir Puteh and Kuala Pari
7th	N20	1986-1990	Foo Tiew @ Foo Piew Kok (符标国)	DAP
8th	N20	1990-1995	Choo Sing Chye (周胜才)	DAP
9th	N23	1995-1999	Chew Wai Khoon (赵伟权)	BN (MCA)
10th	N23	1999-2004	Chew Wai Khoon (赵伟权)	BN (MCA)
11th	N26	2004-2008	Chew Wai Khoon (赵伟权)	BN (MCA)
12th	N26	2008-2013	Ong Boon Piow (黃文标)	PR (DAP)
13th	N26	2013-2018	Ong Boon Piow (黃文标)	PR (DAP)
14th	N26	2018-2022	Abdul Aziz Bari	PH (DAP)
15th	N26	2022–present	Abdul Aziz Bari	PH (DAP)

== Election results ==
Perak state election, 2022
Party	Candidate	Votes	%	∆%
PH	Abdul Aziz Bari	11,286	40.58	▲40.58
PN	Mohammad Iskandar Abdul Rahman	10,626	38.21	▲38.21
BN	Tony Khoo Boon Chuan	5,705	20.51	▼10.48
GTA	Mior Nor Haidir Suhaimi	194	0.70	▲0.70
Total valid votes		27,811	100.00	
Total rejected ballots		252		
Unreturned ballots		124		
Turnout		28,187	75.72	▼5.45
Registered electors		37,223		
Majority		660	2.37	▼16.63
PH hold		Swing		

Perak state election, 2018
Party	Candidate	Votes	%	∆%
PKR	Abdul Aziz Bari	10,334	49.99	▲49.99
BN	Tony Khoo Boon Chuan	6,407	30.99	▲1.47
PAS	Mazlan Isa	3,931	19.02	▲19.02
Total valid votes		20,672	98.44	
Total rejected ballots		231	1.10	
Unreturned ballots		191	0.91	
Turnout		21,094	80.97	▲3.87
Registered electors		26,052		
Majority		3,927	19.00	▼21.96
PKR hold		Swing		
Source(s) "RESULTS OF CONTESTED ELECTION AND STATEMENTS OF THE POLL AFTER THE OFFICIAL ADDITION OF VOTES".

Perak state election, 2013
Party	Candidate	Votes	%	∆%
DAP	Ong Boon Piow	10,131	70.48	▲9.89
BN	Tony Khoo Boon Chuan	4,244	29.52	▼9.89
Total valid votes		14,375	98.04	
Total rejected ballots		243	1.66	
Unreturned ballots		44	0.30	
Turnout		14,662	77.10	▲10.09
Registered electors		19,006		
Majority		5,887	40.96	▲19.78
DAP hold		Swing		
Source(s) "KEPUTUSAN PILIHAN RAYA UMUM DEWAN UNDANGAN NEGERI". Archived from the original on 2022-10-26.

Perak state election, 2008
Party	Candidate	Votes	%	∆%
DAP	Ong Boon Piow	7,197	60.59	▲15.02
BN	Chew Wai Khoon	4,682	39.41	▼15.02
Total valid votes		11,879	98.08	
Total rejected ballots		175	1.44	
Unreturned ballots		58	0.48	
Turnout		12,112	67.01	▲3.71
Registered electors		18,074		
Majority		2,515	21.18	▲12.32
DAP gain from BN		Swing		?
Source(s) "KEPUTUSAN PILIHAN RAYA UMUM DEWAN UNDANGAN NEGERI PERAK BAGI TAHUN 2008".

Perak state election, 2004
Party	Candidate	Votes	%	∆%
BN	Chew Wai Khoon	6,313	54.43	▼0.56
DAP	Raymond Chong Chyi	5,286	45.57	▲0.56
Total valid votes		11,599	97.54	
Total rejected ballots		222	1.87	
Unreturned ballots		71	0.60	
Turnout		11,892	63.30	▲4.48
Registered electors		18,787		
Majority		1,027	8.86	▼1.12
BN hold		Swing		
Source(s) "KEPUTUSAN PILIHAN RAYA UMUM DEWAN UNDANGAN NEGERI PERAK BAGI TAHUN 2008".

Perak state election, 1999
Party	Candidate	Votes	%	∆%
BN	Chew Wai Khoon	6,894	54.99	▼0.66
DAP	Fan Yew Teng	5,642	45.01	▲0.66
Total valid votes		12,536	98.21	
Total rejected ballots		190	1.49	
Unreturned ballots		39	0.31	
Turnout		12,765	58.82	▼2.25
Registered electors		21,703		
Majority		1,252	9.98	▼1.32
BN hold		Swing		
Source(s) "KEPUTUSAN PILIHAN RAYA UMUM DEWAN UNDANGAN NEGERI PERAK BAGI TAHUN 1999".

Perak state election, 1995
Party	Candidate	Votes	%	∆%
BN	Chew Wai Khoon	7,097	55.65	▼22.07
DAP	Kerk Kim Hock	5,656	44.35	▲22.07
Total valid votes		12,753	98.03	
Total rejected ballots		214	1.65	
Unreturned ballots		42	0.32	
Turnout		13,009	61.07	▼4.35
Registered electors		21,303		
Majority		1,441	11.30	▼21.54
BN gain from DAP		Swing		?
Source(s) "KEPUTUSAN PILIHAN RAYA UMUM DEWAN UNDANGAN NEGERI PERAK BAGI TAHUN 1995".

Perak state election, 1990
Party	Candidate	Votes	%	∆%
DAP	Choo Sing Chye	14,288	66.42	▲1.81
BN	Chan Kam	6,222	33.58	▼0.09
Total valid votes		21,510	98.34	
Total rejected ballots		346	1.66	
Unreturned ballots		0	0.00	
Turnout		20,856	65.42	▼3.19
Registered electors		31,881		
Majority		8,066	32.84	▲1.90
DAP hold		Swing		
Source(s) "KEPUTUSAN PILIHAN RAYA UMUM DEWAN UNDANGAN NEGERI PERAK BAGI TAHUN 1990".

Perak state election, 1986
Party	Candidate	Votes	%
DAP	Foo Tiew @ Foo Piew Kok	13,740	64.61
BN	Liew Yoon Sim	7,160	33.67
SDP	Wong To @ Wong Nam Sang	366	1.72
Total valid votes		21,266	98.12
Total rejected ballots		408	1.88
Unreturned ballots		0	0.00
Turnout		21,674	68.61
Registered electors		31,591	
Majority		6,580	30.94
This was a new constituency created.
Source(s) "KEPUTUSAN PILIHAN RAYA UMUM DEWAN UNDANGAN NEGERI PERAK BAGI TAHUN 1986".
