= Kepayang (state constituency) =

Electoral district in Perak, Malaysia

Kepayang (N29)
Perak constituency

State constituency
- Legislature: Perak State Legislative Assembly
MLA
Nga Kor Ming
PH
- Constituency created: 1974
- Constituency abolished: 1986
- Constituency re-created: 2003
- First contested: 1974
- Last contested: 2022

Demographics
- Electors (2022): 25,190

Kepayang is a state constituency in Perak, Malaysia, that has been represented in the Perak State Legislative Assembly.

== Demographics ==
Ethnic breakdown of Kepayang's electorate as of 2022
1. Chinese (61.0%)
2. Malay (21.1%)
3. Indian (16.6%)
4. Other ethnicities (1.30%)

== History ==
=== Polling districts ===
According to the federal gazette issued on 31 October 2022, the Kepayang constituency is divided into 13 polling districts.

State constituency	Polling districts	Code	Location
Kepayang（N29）	Taman Che Wan	065/29/01	SK Seri Mutiara
Kepayang（N29）	Gurap	065/29/02	SMJK Yuk Choy
Kepayang（N29）	Gunong Lang	065/29/03	SMJK Yuk Choy
Kepayang（N29）	Kepayang Mesjid	065/29/04	SMK Seri Intan
Kepayang（N29）	Star Park	065/29/05	Kolej Tingkatan Enam Seri Putera
Kepayang（N29）	Fair Park	065/29/06	Kolej Tingkatan Enam Seri Putera
Kepayang（N29）	Kampong Pisang	065/29/07	SK Jalan Panglima Bukit Gantang
Kepayang（N29）	Jalan Bijih Timah	065/29/08	SJK (C) Perak
Kepayang（N29）	Jalan Datuk Onn Jaafar	065/29/09	SK Cator Avenue
Kepayang（N29）	Waller Court	065/29/10	SK Coronation Park
Kepayang（N29）	Green Town	065/29/11	SK Sri Kinta
Kepayang（N29）	Jalan Raja Ekram	065/29/12	SJK (C) Sam Tet
Kepayang（N29）	Jalan C.M. Yusof	065/29/13	SJK (C) Ave Maria Convent

=== Representation history ===
Members of the Perak State Assembly for Kepayang
Assembly	No	Years	Member	Party
Constituency created from Pasir Puteh
4th	N22	1974 - 1978	Lim Cho Hock (林子鹤)	DAP
5th	N22	1978 - 1982	Lim Cho Hock (林子鹤)	DAP
6th	N22	1982	Lim Cho Hock (林子鹤)	DAP
6th	N22	1982 - 1986	Lau Dak Kee (刘德琦)	DAP
Constituency abolished, split into Tasek, Dermawan, Sungai Rokam and Tebing Tinggi
Constituency created from Tebing Tinggi, Bercham and Buntong
11th	N29	2004 – 2008	Tan Chin Meng (陈進明)	BN (MCA)
12th	N29	2008 – 2013	Loke Chee Yan (陸致仁)	PR (DAP)
13th	N29	2013 – 2015	Nga Kor Ming (倪可敏)	PR (DAP)
13th	N29	2015 – 2018	Nga Kor Ming (倪可敏)	PH (DAP)
14th	N29	2018 – 2022	Ko Chung Sen (许崇信)	PH (DAP)
15th	N29	2022 – Present	Nga Kor Ming (倪可敏)	PH (DAP)

== Election results ==
Perak state election, 2022
Party	Candidate	Votes	%	∆%
PH	Nga Kor Ming	11,977	72.60	▲72.60
PN	Richard Ng	2,486	15.07	▲15.07
BN	Lim Huey Shan	2,035	12.33	▼6.72
Total valid votes		16,707	100.00	
Total rejected ballots		177		
Unreturned ballots		32		
Turnout		16,916	66.32	▼8.26
Registered electors		25,190		
Majority		9,491	57.53	▼4.37
PH hold		Swing		

Perak state election, 2018
Party	Candidate	Votes	%	∆%
PKR	Ko Chung Sen	12,417	80.95	▲80.95
BN	Chang Kok Aun	2,922	19.05	▲17.64
Total valid votes		15,339	98.58	
Total rejected ballots		182	1.17	
Unreturned ballots		39	0.25	
Turnout		15,560	74.58	▼4.92
Registered electors		20,864		
Majority		9,495	61.90	▲35.28
PKR hold		Swing		
Source(s) "RESULTS OF CONTESTED ELECTION AND STATEMENTS OF THE POLL AFTER THE OFFICIAL ADDITION OF VOTES".

Perak state election, 2013
Party	Candidate	Votes	%	∆%
DAP	Nga Kor Ming	10,948	63.31	▲11.63
BN	Chang Kok Aun	6,344	36.69	▼11.63
Total valid votes		17,292	98.44	
Total rejected ballots		240	1.37	
Unreturned ballots		34	0.19	
Turnout		17,566	79.50	▲8.59
Registered electors		22,098		
Majority		4,604	26.62	▲23.26
DAP hold		Swing		
Source(s) "KEPUTUSAN PILIHAN RAYA UMUM DEWAN UNDANGAN NEGERI". Archived from the original on 2017-05-10.

Perak state election, 2008
Party	Candidate	Votes	%	∆%
DAP	Loke Chee Yan	7,552	51.68	▲12.49
BN	Tan Chin Meng	7,062	48.32	▼12.49
Total valid votes		14,614	96.96	
Total rejected ballots		304	2.02	
Unreturned ballots		154	1.02	
Turnout		15,072	70.91	▲2.82
Registered electors		21,256		
Majority		490	3.36	▼18.26
DAP gain from BN		Swing		?
Source(s) "KEPUTUSAN PILIHAN RAYA UMUM DEWAN UNDANGAN NEGERI PERAK BAGI TAHUN 2008".

Perak state election, 2004
Party	Candidate	Votes	%	∆%
BN	Tan Chin Meng	8,679	60.81	
DAP	Chong Tat Cheong	5,593	39.19	
Total valid votes		14,272	94.90	
Total rejected ballots		378	2.51	
Unreturned ballots		389	2.59	
Turnout		15,039	68.09	
Registered electors		22,087		
Majority		3,086	21.62	
BN gain from DAP		Swing		?
Source(s) "KEPUTUSAN PILIHAN RAYA UMUM DEWAN UNDANGAN NEGERI PERAK BAGI TAHUN 2004".

Perak state by-election, 16 October 1982 Upon the resignation of the incumbent, Lim Cho Hock
Party	Candidate	Votes	%	∆%
DAP	Lau Dak Kee	16,246	71.48	▲1.46
BN	Ng Yok Kooi	6,482	28.52	▼0.57
Total valid votes		22,728	100.00	
Total rejected ballots		283		
Unreturned ballots		0		
Turnout		23,011	59.90	▼13.77
Registered electors		38,418		
Majority		9,764	42.96	▲42.38
DAP hold		Swing		

Perak state election, 1978
Party	Candidate	Votes	%	∆%
DAP	Lim Cho Hock	17,848	70.02	▼1.77
BN	R. Jegaheesa	7,414	29.09	▲29.09
Independent	Ng Thor Fung	228	0.89	▲0.89
Total valid votes		25,490	100.00	
Total rejected ballots		765		
Unreturned ballots		0		
Turnout		26,255	79.68	▼2.47
Registered electors		32,951		
Majority		10,434	40.93	▼2.65
DAP hold		Swing		

Perak state election, 1974
Party	Candidate	Votes	%
DAP	Lim Cho Hock	14,143	71.79
BN	Chan Yoon Onn	5,558	28.21
Total valid votes		19,701	100.00
Total rejected ballots		807	
Unreturned ballots		0	
Turnout		20,508	82.15
Registered electors		24,965	
Majority		8,585	43.58
This was a new constituency created.
