= Buntong (state constituency) =

State constituency of Perak

Buntong (N30)
Perak constituency

State constituency
- Legislature: Perak State Legislative Assembly
MLA
Thulsi Thivani Manogaran
PH
- Constituency created: 1994
- First contested: 1995
- Last contested: 2022

Demographics
- Electors (2022): 36,714

Buntong is a state constituency in Perak, Malaysia. It is located in the Ipoh Barat federal constituency. It has been represented in the Perak State Legislative Assembly by Thulsi Thivani Manogaran of Pakatan Harapan (PH) since 2022.

== Demographics ==
Ethnic breakdown of Buntong's electorate as of 2022
1. Indians (52.0%)
2. Chinese (41.5%)
3. Malays (5.78%)
4. Other Ethnicities (0.71%)

Buntong has the greatest percentage of Indian voters among state constituencies in Malaysia, followed by Sentosa, Kota Raja. Its current voter composition is 52% Indians, 42% Chinese, 6% Malays and 1% Other Ethnicities.

== Representation history ==
Members of the Perak State Assembly for Buntong
Assembly	No	Years	Member	Party
Constituency split from Sungei Pari, Chemor, Tasek, Falim and Lahat
9th	N26	1995–1999	Yik Phooi Hong (易沛鸿)	BN (MCA)
10th	N26	1999–2004	Yik Phooi Hong (易沛鸿)	BN (MCA)
11th	N30	2004–2008	Yik Phooi Hong (易沛鸿)	BN (MCA)
12th	N30	2008–2013	Sivasubramaniam Athinarayanan	PR (DAP)
13th	N30	2013–2015	Sivasubramaniam Athinarayanan	PR (DAP)
13th	N30	2015–2018	Sivasubramaniam Athinarayanan	PH (DAP)
14th	N30	2018–2020	Sivasubramaniam Athinarayanan	PH (DAP)
14th	N30	2020	Sivasubramaniam Athinarayanan	Independent
14th	N30	2020–2021	Sivasubramaniam Athinarayanan	GERAKAN
14th	N30	2021	Sivasubramaniam Athinarayanan	PN (GERAKAN)
14th	N30	2021	Sivasubramaniam Athinarayanan	PN (BERSATU)
14th	N30	2022	Sivasubramaniam Athinarayanan	PBM
14th	N30	2022	Sivasubramaniam Athinarayanan	PN (BERSATU)
15th	N30	2022–present	Thulsi Thivani Manogaran	PH (DAP)

== Polling districts ==
According to the federal gazette issued on 31 October 2022, the Buntong constituency is divided into 9 polling districts.

State constituency	Polling districts	Code	Location
Buntong（N30）	Taman Lim	065/30/01	SMK Dr. Megat Khas
Buntong（N30）	Jalan Tun Abdul Razak	065/30/02	SMK Tarcisian Convent
Buntong（N30）	Jalan Silibin	065/30/03	SJK (T) St. Philomena Convent; Kolej Tingkatan Enam Seri Ipoh
Buntong（N30）	Jalan Klian Intan	065/30/04	SJK (C) Guntong
Buntong（N30）	Kampong Baru Buntong	065/30/05	SK Guru Kalgidhar
Buntong（N30）	Jalan Sungai Pari	065/30/06	SJK (T) Kerajaan
Buntong（N30）	Falim	065/30/07	SJK (C) Min Tet
Buntong（N30）	Kampong Kacang Puteh	065/30/08	SJK (T) Methodist; SMK Buntong
Buntong（N30）	Desa Rishah	065/30/09	SK Buntong

== Election results ==
Perak state election, 2022
Party	Candidate	Votes	%	∆%
PH	Thulsi Thivani Manogaran	21,412	84.02	▲84.02
BN	Jayagopi Subramaniam	2,257	8.86	▼3.61
PN	Sivasubramaniam Athinarayanan	1,437	5.64	▲5.64
Independent	Iruthiyam Sebastiar Anthonisamy	237	0.93	▲0.93
Independent	Muhammad Faiz Abdullah	140	0.55	▲0.55
Total valid votes		25,483	100.00	
Total rejected ballots		277		
Unreturned ballots		62		
Turnout		25,822	70.33	▼0.94
Registered electors		36,714		
Majority		19,155	75.96	▲4.69
PH hold		Swing		

Perak state election, 2018
Party	Candidate	Votes	%	∆%
PKR	Sivasubramaniam Athinarayanan	18,005	83.74	▲83.74
BN	Thangarani Thiagarajan	2,682	12.47	▼12.32
Parti Sosialis Malaysia	Mohanarani Rasiah	813	3.78	▲3.78
Total valid votes		21,500	96.59	
Total rejected ballots		371	1.67	
Unreturned ballots		388	1.74	
Turnout		22,259	79.80	▲0.16
Registered electors		27,894		
Majority		15,323	71.27	▲23.02
PKR hold		Swing		
Source(s) "RESULTS OF CONTESTED ELECTION AND STATEMENTS OF THE POLL AFTER THE OFFICIAL ADDITION OF VOTES".

Perak state election, 2013
Party	Candidate	Votes	%	∆%
DAP	Sivasubramaniam Athinarayanan	13,062	73.04	▲5.68
BN	Sivarraajh Chandran	4,433	24.79	▼7.85
Independent	Iruthiyam Sebastiar Anthonisamy	261	1.46	▲1.46
Independent	Mohd Basri Shafie	127	0.71	▼0.71
Total valid votes		17,883	98.29	
Total rejected ballots		312	1.71	
Unreturned ballots		44	0.24	
Turnout		18,195	79.64	▲8.66
Registered electors		22,847		
Majority		13,916	48.25	▲13.53
DAP hold		Swing		
Source(s) "KEPUTUSAN PILIHAN RAYA UMUM DEWAN UNDANGAN NEGERI".

Perak state election, 2008
Party	Candidate	Votes	%	∆%
DAP	Sivasubramaniam Athinarayanan	10,311	67.36	▲9.17
BN	Lee Tung Lai	4,996	32.64	▼9.17
Total valid votes		15,307	98.34	
Total rejected ballots		258	0.17	
Unreturned ballots		1	0.01	
Turnout		15,566	70.98	▲6.02
Registered electors		21,930		
Majority		6,010	34.72	▲18.34
DAP gain from BN		Swing		?
Source(s) "KEPUTUSAN PILIHAN RAYA UMUM DEWAN UNDANGAN NEGERI PERAK BAGI TAHUN 2008".

Perak state election, 2004
Party	Candidate	Votes	%	∆%
BN	Yik Phooi Hong	8,464	58.19	▼0.97
DAP	Sivasubramaniam Athinarayanan	6,082	41.81	▲0.97
Total valid votes		14,546	97.78	
Total rejected ballots		290	1.95	
Unreturned ballots		41	0.28	
Turnout		14,877	64.96	▼1.45
Registered electors		22,902		
Majority		2,382	16.38	▼1.94
BN hold		Swing		
Source(s) "KEPUTUSAN PILIHAN RAYA UMUM DEWAN UNDANGAN NEGERI PERAK BAGI TAHUN 2004".

Perak state election, 1999
Party	Candidate	Votes	%	∆%
BN	Yik Phooi Hong	13,001	59.16	▼3.73
DAP	M. Kulasegaran	8,974	40.84	▲3.73
Total valid votes		21,975	97.35	
Total rejected ballots		490	2.17	
Unreturned ballots		108	0.48	
Turnout		22,573	66.41	▼1.22
Registered electors		33,988		
Majority		4,027	18.32	▼7.46
BN hold		Swing		
Source(s) "KEPUTUSAN PILIHAN RAYA UMUM DEWAN UNDANGAN NEGERI PERAK BAGI TAHUN 1999".

Perak state election, 1995
Party	Candidate	Votes	%
BN	Yik Phooi Hong	13,731	62.89
DAP	Chen Tiam Seong	8,104	37.11
Total valid votes		21,835	97.66
Total rejected ballots		435	1.95
Unreturned ballots		89	0.40
Turnout		22,359	67.63
Registered electors		33,060	
Majority		5,627	25.78
This was a new constituency created.
Source(s) "KEPUTUSAN PILIHAN RAYA UMUM DEWAN UNDANGAN NEGERI PERAK BAGI TAHUN 1995".
