= Bercham (state constituency) =

Political subdivision in Malaysia

Bercham (N28)
Perak constituency

State constituency
- Legislature: Perak State Legislative Assembly
MLA
Ong Boon Piow
PH
- Constituency created: 1995
- First contested: 1995
- Last contested: 2022

Demographics
- Population (2020): 70,269
- Electors (2022): 52,750

Bercham is a state constituency in Perak, Malaysia, that has been represented in the Perak State Legislative Assembly.

== Demographics ==
Ethnic breakdown of Bercham's electorate as of 2022
1. Chinese (69.8%)
2. Malay (15.2%)
3. Indian (14.3%)
4. Other ethnicities (0.62%)

== History ==
=== Polling districts ===
According to the federal gazette issued on 31 October 2022, the Bercham constituency is divided into 8 polling districts.

State constituency	Polling districts	Code	Location
Bercham（N28）	Bercham Timor	065/28/01	SJK (C) Bercham
Bercham（N28）	Kampong Bercham	065/28/02	SJK (C) Bercham
Bercham（N28）	Dermawan Utara	065/28/03	SMK Bercham
Bercham（N28）	Bercham Selatan	065/28/04	SMK Jalan Tasek
Bercham（N28）	Tasek Dermawan	065/28/05	SK Tasek Dermawan
Bercham（N28）	Tasek	065/28/06	SK Tasek
Bercham（N28）	Kampong Tawas Utara	065/28/07	SJK (C) St Michael & All Angels
Bercham（N28）	Kampong Tawas	065/28/08	SJK (C) Kampung Tawas

=== Representation history ===
Members of the Legislative Assembly for Bercham
Assembly	No	Years	Name	Party
Constituency created from Dermawan, Sungai Pari, Tasek and Chemor
9th	N25	1995-1999	Tan Chin Meng (陈進明)	BN (MCA)
10th	N25	1999-2004	Tan Chin Meng (陈進明)	BN (MCA)
11th	N28	2004-2008	Gooi Seng Teik (魏胜德)	BN (MCA)
12th	N28	2008-2013	Sum Cheok Leng (岑卓能)	PR (DAP)
13th	N28	2013-2018	Cheong Chee Khing (张志坚)	PR (DAP)
14th	N28	2018-2022	Ong Boon Piow (黃文标)	PH (DAP)
15th	N28	2022–present	Ong Boon Piow (黃文标)	PH (DAP)

== Election results ==
Perak state election, 2022
Party	Candidate	Votes	%	∆%
PH	Ong Boon Piow	29,596	81.24	▲81.24
BN	Albert Hoo Wai Mun	3,482	9.56	▼4.85
PN	Lim Jin Sheng	3,351	9.20	▲9.20
Total valid votes		36,786	100.00	
Total rejected ballots		270		
Unreturned ballots		87		
Turnout		37,143	69.74	▼10.55
Registered electors		52,750		
Majority		26,114	71.68	▲0.50
PH hold		Swing		

Perak state election, 2018
Party	Candidate	Votes	%	∆%
PKR	Ong Boon Piow	24,647	85.59	▲85.59
BN	Low Guo Nan	3,938	14.41	▼9.30
Total valid votes		28,585	98.44	
Total rejected ballots		292	1.01	
Unreturned ballots		162	0.56	
Turnout		29,039	80.29	▼2.81
Registered electors		36,116		
Majority		20,709	71.18	▲20.00
PKR hold		Swing		
Source(s) "RESULTS OF CONTESTED ELECTION AND STATEMENTS OF THE POLL AFTER THE OFFICIAL ADDITION OF VOTES".

Perak state election, 2013
Party	Candidate	Votes	%	∆%
DAP	Cheong Chee Khing	20,362	74.89	▲9.63
BN	Lim Huey Shan	6,446	23.71	▼11.03
Independent	Kalimuthu Ranggayah	93	0.34	▲0.34
Total valid votes		27,189	99.71	
Total rejected ballots		288	1.06	
Unreturned ballots		80	0.29	
Turnout		27,269	83.10	▼52.58
Registered electors		32,816		
Majority		13,916	51.18	▲20.66
DAP hold		Swing		
Source(s) "KEPUTUSAN PILIHAN RAYA UMUM DEWAN UNDANGAN NEGERI". Archived from the original on 2022-03-11.

Perak state election, 2008
Party	Candidate	Votes	%	∆%
DAP	Sum Cheok Leng	12,848	65.26	▲19.18
BN	Gooi Seng Teik	6,838	34.74	▼15.15
Total valid votes		19,686	98.60	
Total rejected ballots		249	1.25	
Unreturned ballots		31	0.16	
Turnout		19,966	75.10	▲3.10
Registered electors		26,587		
Majority		6,010	30.52	▲26.71
DAP gain from BN		Swing		?
Source(s) "KEPUTUSAN PILIHAN RAYA UMUM DEWAN UNDANGAN NEGERI PERAK BAGI TAHUN 2008".

Perak state election, 2004
Party	Candidate	Votes	%	∆%
BN	Gooi Seng Teik	8,231	49.89	▼7.24
DAP	Sum Cheok Leng	7,603	46.08	▼11.05
PKR	Tan Seng Toh	665	4.03	▲4.03
Total valid votes		16,499	99.51	
Total rejected ballots		289	1.74	
Unreturned ballots		63	0.38	
Turnout		16,851	72.00	▲2.09
Registered electors		23,405		
Majority		628	3.81	▼10.45
BN hold		Swing		
Source(s) "KEPUTUSAN PILIHAN RAYA UMUM DEWAN UNDANGAN NEGERI PERAK BAGI TAHUN 2008".

Perak state election, 1999
Party	Candidate	Votes	%	∆%
BN	Tan Chin Meng	14,215	57.13	▼2.08
DAP	Chong Tat Cheong	10,668	42.87	▲2.08
Total valid votes		24,883	95.25	
Total rejected ballots		467	1.79	
Unreturned ballots		773	2.96	
Turnout		26,123	69.91	▼0.36
Registered electors		37,367		
Majority		3,547	14.26	▼4.16
BN hold		Swing		
Source(s) "KEPUTUSAN PILIHAN RAYA UMUM DEWAN UNDANGAN NEGERI PERAK BAGI TAHUN 2008".

Perak state election, 1995
Party	Candidate	Votes	%
BN	Tan Chin Meng	13,442	59.21
DAP	Wong Yoon Choong	9,259	40.79
Total valid votes		22,701	96.60
Total rejected ballots		573	2.44
Unreturned ballots		227	0.97
Turnout		23,501	70.27
Registered electors		33,442	
Majority		4,183	18.42
This was a new constituency created.
Source(s) "KEPUTUSAN PILIHAN RAYA UMUM DEWAN UNDANGAN NEGERI PERAK BAGI TAHUN 2008".
