= Results of the 2022 Malaysian state elections by constituency =

These are the election results of the 2022 Malaysian general election by state constituency. State assembly elections were held in Malaysia on 19 November 2022 as part of the general elections. Results are expected to come on the same day, after 5 pm. Elected members of the legislative assembly (MLAs) will be representing their constituency from the first sitting of respective state legislative assembly to its dissolution.

The state legislature election deposit was set at RM5,000 per candidate. Similar to previous elections, the election deposit will be forfeited if the particular candidate had failed to secure at least 12.5% or one-eighth of the votes.

== General results ==
State / Federal Territory	Barisan Nasional					Pakatan Harapan + Malaysian United Democratic Alliance					Perikatan Nasional					Gerakan Tanah Air					Others / Independents				
State / Federal Territory	Votes	%	Seats	%	±!	Votes	%	Seats	%	±!	Votes	%	Seats	%	±!	Votes	%	Seats	%	±!	Votes	%	Seats	%	±!
Pahang	337,533	38.75	17	38.10	▼8	188,230	21.61	8	19.05	▼1	340,378	39.07	17	40.48	▲9	4,929	0.58	0	0.00	Steady	2,125	0.25	0	0.00	Steady
Perak	380,816	20.38	9	15.25	▼18	624,594	42.35	24	40.68	▼4	456,034	30.92	26	44.07	▲22	4,277	0.00	0	0.00	Steady	9,244	0.00	0	0.00	Steady
Perlis	36,301	24.49	0	0.00	▼10	27,856	18.79	1	6.67	▼2	77,504	52.29	14	93.33	▲12	905	0.00	0	0.00	Steady	5,646	0.00	0	0.00	Steady

== Detailed Results ==
=== Perlis ===
#	Constituency	Registered Electors	Winner	Votes	Votes %	Majority	Opponent(s)	Votes	Votes %	Total valid votes	Incumbent
N01	Titi Tinggi	13,403	Izizam Ibrahim (PN–BERSATU)	5,601	58.43%	3,785	Teh Chai Ann (BN–MCA)	1,816	18.94%	9,587	Teh Chai Ann (BN–MCA)
N01	Titi Tinggi	13,403	Izizam Ibrahim (PN–BERSATU)	5,601	58.43%	3,785	Teh Seng Chuan (PH–DAP)	1,512	15.77%	9,587	Teh Chai Ann (BN–MCA)
N01	Titi Tinggi	13,403	Izizam Ibrahim (PN–BERSATU)	5,601	58.43%	3,785	Zahidi Zainul Abidin (IND)	425	4.43%	9,587	Teh Chai Ann (BN–MCA)
N01	Titi Tinggi	13,403	Izizam Ibrahim (PN–BERSATU)	5,601	58.43%	3,785	Mohd Shahril Md Sarif (GTA–PEJUANG)	152	1.59%	9,587	Teh Chai Ann (BN–MCA)
N01	Titi Tinggi	13,403	Izizam Ibrahim (PN–BERSATU)	5,601	58.43%	3,785	Khaw Hock Kong (WARISAN)	81	0.84%	9,587	Teh Chai Ann (BN–MCA)
N02	Beseri	12,128	Haziq Asyraf Dun (PN–PAS)	4,040	45.84%	1,047	Rozaini Rais (BN–UMNO)	2,993	33.96%	8,813	Rozaini Rais (BN–UMNO)
N02	Beseri	12,128	Haziq Asyraf Dun (PN–PAS)	4,040	45.84%	1,047	Mat Safar Saad (PH–AMANAH)	1,684	19.11%	8,813	Rozaini Rais (BN–UMNO)
N02	Beseri	12,128	Haziq Asyraf Dun (PN–PAS)	4,040	45.84%	1,047	Mohd Shamim M Nurdin (WARISAN)	96	1.09%	8,813	Rozaini Rais (BN–UMNO)
N03	Chuping	14,248	Saad Seman (PN–PAS)	5,873	53.74%	2,420	Asmaiza Ahmad (BN–UMNO)	3,453	31.60%	10,928	Asmaiza Ahmad (BN–UMNO)
N03	Chuping	14,248	Saad Seman (PN–PAS)	5,873	53.74%	2,420	Natthavuth Seng (PH–PKR)	1,602	14.66%	10,928	Asmaiza Ahmad (BN–UMNO)
N04	Mata Ayer	9,662	Wan Badariyah Wan Saad (PN–PAS)	4,419	58.06%	2,021	Siti Berenee Yahaya (BN–UMNO)	2,398	31.51%	7,611	Siti Berenee Yahaya (BN–UMNO)
N04	Mata Ayer	9,662	Wan Badariyah Wan Saad (PN–PAS)	4,419	58.06%	2,021	Amran Kamarudin (PH–PKR)	794	10.43%	7,611	Siti Berenee Yahaya (BN–UMNO)
N05	Santan	10,751	Azmir Azizan (PN–PAS)	4,752	56.40%	2,108	Azizan Sulaiman (BN–UMNO)	2,644	31.38%	8,426	Azizan Sulaiman (BN–UMNO)
N05	Santan	10,751	Azmir Azizan (PN–PAS)	4,752	56.40%	2,108	Che Mazlina Che Yob (PH–AMANAH)	1,030	12.22%	8,426	Azizan Sulaiman (BN–UMNO)
N06	Bintong	16,366	Fakhrul Anwar Ismail (PN–PAS)	7,325	57.59%	4,329	Azlan Man (BN–UMNO)	2,996	23.55%	12,721	Azlan Man (BN–UMNO)
N06	Bintong	16,366	Fakhrul Anwar Ismail (PN–PAS)	7,325	57.59%	4,329	Azhari Ahmad (PH–AMANAH)	2,029	15.95%	12,721	Azlan Man (BN–UMNO)
N06	Bintong	16,366	Fakhrul Anwar Ismail (PN–PAS)	7,325	57.59%	4,329	Hashim Suboh (IND)	157	1.23%	12,721	Azlan Man (BN–UMNO)
N06	Bintong	16,366	Fakhrul Anwar Ismail (PN–PAS)	7,325	57.59%	4,329	Shazwan Suban (GTA–PEJUANG)	157	1.23%	12,721	Azlan Man (BN–UMNO)
N06	Bintong	16,366	Fakhrul Anwar Ismail (PN–PAS)	7,325	57.59%	4,329	Mohamad Khair Mohd Noor (WARISAN)	57	0.45%	12,721	Azlan Man (BN–UMNO)
N07	Sena	15,870	Marzita Mansor (PN–BERSATU)	5,556	47.28%	2,200	Asrul Nizan Abd Jalil (PH–PKR)	3,356	28.55%	11,753	Asrul Nizan Abd Jalil (PH–PKR)
N07	Sena	15,870	Marzita Mansor (PN–BERSATU)	5,556	47.28%	2,200	Saiful Daniel Mohd Yusof (BN–UMNO)	2,619	22.28%	11,753	Asrul Nizan Abd Jalil (PH–PKR)
N07	Sena	15,870	Marzita Mansor (PN–BERSATU)	5,556	47.28%	2,200	Mohd Faizal Yunus (GTA–PEJUANG)	222	1.89%	11,753	Asrul Nizan Abd Jalil (PH–PKR)
N08	Indera Kayangan	14,465	Gan Ay Ling (PH–PKR)	4,830	46.42%	1,873	Pramoot Puan (PN–BERSATU)	2,957	28.42%	10,405	Gan Ay Ling (PH–PKR)
N08	Indera Kayangan	14,465	Gan Ay Ling (PH–PKR)	4,830	46.42%	1,873	Lim Weng Khee (BN–MCA)	1,882	18.09%	10,405	Gan Ay Ling (PH–PKR)
N08	Indera Kayangan	14,465	Gan Ay Ling (PH–PKR)	4,830	46.42%	1,873	Atan Jasin (WARISAN)	736	7.07%	10,405	Gan Ay Ling (PH–PKR)
N09	Kuala Perlis	14,717	Abu Bakar Hamzah (PN–BERSATU)	3,207	30.06%	154	Nor Azam Karap (PH–PKR)	3,053	28.61%	10,670	Nor Azam Karap (PH–PKR)
N09	Kuala Perlis	14,717	Abu Bakar Hamzah (PN–BERSATU)	3,207	30.06%	154	Azahar Ahmad (IND)	2,197	20.59%	10,670	Nor Azam Karap (PH–PKR)
N09	Kuala Perlis	14,717	Abu Bakar Hamzah (PN–BERSATU)	3,207	30.06%	154	Kamarudin Malek (BN–UMNO)	2,145	20.10%	10,670	Nor Azam Karap (PH–PKR)
N09	Kuala Perlis	14,717	Abu Bakar Hamzah (PN–BERSATU)	3,207	30.06%	154	Muhamad Hairi Noordin (WARISAN)	68	0.64%	10,670	Nor Azam Karap (PH–PKR)
N10	Kayang	13,441	Asrul Aimran Abd Jalil (PN–PAS)	6,178	58.31%	3,261	Hamizan Hassan (BN–UMNO)	2,917	27.53%	10,596	Hamizan Hassan (BN–UMNO)
N10	Kayang	13,441	Asrul Aimran Abd Jalil (PN–PAS)	6,178	58.31%	3,261	Wan Kharizal Wan Khazim (PH–AMANAH)	1,400	13.21%	10,596	Hamizan Hassan (BN–UMNO)
N10	Kayang	13,441	Asrul Aimran Abd Jalil (PN–PAS)	6,178	58.31%	3,261	Mohd Khairuddin Abdullah (WARISAN)	101	0.95%	10,596	Hamizan Hassan (BN–UMNO)
N11	Pauh	14,797	Megat Hashirat Hassan (PN–BERSATU)	4,924	44.18%	2,229	Syed Atif Syed Abu Bakar (BN–UMNO)	2,695	24.18%	11,145	Rozieana Ahmad (BN–UMNO)
N11	Pauh	14,797	Megat Hashirat Hassan (PN–BERSATU)	4,924	44.18%	2,229	Azhar Ameir (PH–PKR)	2,369	21.26%	11,145	Rozieana Ahmad (BN–UMNO)
N11	Pauh	14,797	Megat Hashirat Hassan (PN–BERSATU)	4,924	44.18%	2,229	Mohd Khalid Ahmad (WARISAN)	1,157	10.38%	11,145	Rozieana Ahmad (BN–UMNO)
N12	Tambun Tulang	13,451	Wan Zikri Afthar Ishak (PN–BERSATU)	5,456	53.69%	2,485	Ismail Kassim (BN–UMNO)	2,971	29.23%	10,163	Ismail Kassim (BN–UMNO)
N12	Tambun Tulang	13,451	Wan Zikri Afthar Ishak (PN–BERSATU)	5,456	53.69%	2,485	Muhammad Syahmi Suhaimi (PH–PKR)	1,554	15.29%	10,163	Ismail Kassim (BN–UMNO)
N12	Tambun Tulang	13,451	Wan Zikri Afthar Ishak (PN–BERSATU)	5,456	53.69%	2,485	Maton Din (GTA–PEJUANG)	182	1.79%	10,163	Ismail Kassim (BN–UMNO)
N13	Guar Sanji	11,510	Mohd Ridzuan Hashim (PN–PAS)	6,717	74.20%	5,101	Rozieana Ahmad (BN–UMNO)	1,616	17.85%	9,053	Mohd Ridzuan Hashim (PN–PAS)
N13	Guar Sanji	11,510	Mohd Ridzuan Hashim (PN–PAS)	6,717	74.20%	5,101	Hasparizal Hassan (PH–PKR)	601	6.64%	9,053	Mohd Ridzuan Hashim (PN–PAS)
N13	Guar Sanji	11,510	Mohd Ridzuan Hashim (PN–PAS)	6,717	74.20%	5,101	Abdul Malik Abdullah (GTA–PEJUANG)	119	1.31%	9,053	Mohd Ridzuan Hashim (PN–PAS)
N14	Simpang Empat	10,697	Razali Saad (PN–PAS)	5,388	66.59%	4,008	Nurulhisham Yaakob (BN–UMNO)	1,380	17.01%	8,115	Nurulhisham Yaakob (BN–UMNO)
N14	Simpang Empat	10,697	Razali Saad (PN–PAS)	5,388	66.59%	4,008	Amran Darus (PH–PKR)	1,111	13.69%	8,115	Nurulhisham Yaakob (BN–UMNO)
N14	Simpang Empat	10,697	Razali Saad (PN–PAS)	5,388	66.59%	4,008	Ammar Hassan (IND)	128	1.58%	8,115	Nurulhisham Yaakob (BN–UMNO)
N14	Simpang Empat	10,697	Razali Saad (PN–PAS)	5,388	66.59%	4,008	Izhar Kamarudin Sudin (GTA–PEJUANG)	73	0.90%	8,115	Nurulhisham Yaakob (BN–UMNO)
N14	Simpang Empat	10,697	Razali Saad (PN–PAS)	5,388	66.59%	4,008	Wan Noralhakim Shaghir Saad (WARISAN)	35	0.43%	8,115	Nurulhisham Yaakob (BN–UMNO)
N15	Sanglang	10,421	Mohd. Shukri Ramli (PN–PAS)	5,111	62.13%	3,335	Sharifudin Ahmad (BN–UMNO)	1,776	21.59%	8,226	Mohd. Shukri Ramli (PN–PAS)
N15	Sanglang	10,421	Mohd. Shukri Ramli (PN–PAS)	5,111	62.13%	3,335	Ahmad Fadzhil Mohamad (PH–AMANAH)	931	11.32%	8,226	Mohd. Shukri Ramli (PN–PAS)
N15	Sanglang	10,421	Mohd. Shukri Ramli (PN–PAS)	5,111	62.13%	3,335	Zainudin Yom (WARISAN)	408	4.96%	8,226	Mohd. Shukri Ramli (PN–PAS)

=== Perak ===
#	Constituency	Registered Electors	Winner	Votes	Votes %	Majority	Opponent(s)	Votes	Votes %	Total valid votes	Incumbent
N01	Pengkalan Hulu	20,157	Mohamad Amin Roslan (PN–PAS)	7,114	47.60%	1,324	Aznel Ibrahim (BN–UMNO)	5,790	38.74%	14,945	Aznel Ibrahim (BN–UMNO)
N01	Pengkalan Hulu	20,157	Mohamad Amin Roslan (PN–PAS)	7,114	47.60%	1,324	Mohd Saad Ismail (PH–AMANAH)	2,041	13.66%	14,945	Aznel Ibrahim (BN–UMNO)
N02	Temengor	27,408	Salbiah Mohamed (BN–UMNO)	8,468	43.12%	1,048	Mohd Noor Abdul Rahman (PN–PAS)	7,420	37.79%	19,637	Salbiah Mohamed (BN–UMNO)
N02	Temengor	27,408	Salbiah Mohamed (BN–UMNO)	8,468	43.12%	1,048	Ahmad Safwan Mohamad (PH–PKR)	3,749	19.09%	19,637	Salbiah Mohamed (BN–UMNO)
N03	Kenering	21,596	Husairi Ariffin (PN–PAS)	7,664	46.99%	763	Rohaida Mohamad Yaakub (BN–UMNO)	6,901	42.31%	16,310	Mohd Tarmizi Idris (BN–UMNO)
N03	Kenering	21,596	Husairi Ariffin (PN–PAS)	7,664	46.99%	763	Mohamad Jamean Zulkepli (PH–PKR)	1,745	10.70%	16,310	Mohd Tarmizi Idris (BN–UMNO)
N04	Kota Tampan	15,354	Saarani Mohamad (BN–UMNO)	5,468	48.24%	1,237	Mohd Jamil Yahya (PN–PAS)	4,231	37.32%	11,336	Saarani Mohamad (BN–UMNO)
N04	Kota Tampan	15,354	Saarani Mohamad (BN–UMNO)	5,468	48.24%	1,237	Mohd Sabri Abdul Manaf (PH–AMANAH)	1,637	14.44%	11,336	Saarani Mohamad (BN–UMNO)
N05	Selama	22,339	Mohd Akmal Kamaruddin (PN–PAS)	10,358	58.32%	5,358	Faizul Rizal Zulkifli (BN–UMNO)	5,000	28.15%	17,762	Mohd Akmal Kamaruddin (PN–PAS)
N05	Selama	22,339	Mohd Akmal Kamaruddin (PN–PAS)	10,358	58.32%	5,358	Razali Ismail (PH–AMANAH)	2,343	13.19%	17,762	Mohd Akmal Kamaruddin (PN–PAS)
N05	Selama	22,339	Mohd Akmal Kamaruddin (PN–PAS)	10,358	58.32%	5,358	Osman Sidek (IND)	61	0.34%	17,762	Mohd Akmal Kamaruddin (PN–PAS)
N06	Kubu Gajah	21,358	Khalil Yahaya (PN–PAS)	9,868	59.16%	4,322	Osman Ahmad (BN–UMNO)	5,546	33.25%	16,681	Khalil Yahaya (PN–PAS)
N06	Kubu Gajah	21,358	Khalil Yahaya (PN–PAS)	9,868	59.16%	4,322	Rusli Bakar (PH–AMANAH)	1,188	7.12%	16,681	Khalil Yahaya (PN–PAS)
N06	Kubu Gajah	21,358	Khalil Yahaya (PN–PAS)	9,868	59.16%	4,322	Fuaddin Kamaruddin (GTA–PEJUANG)	79	0.47%	16,681	Khalil Yahaya (PN–PAS)
N07	Batu Kurau	22,022	Mohd Najmuddin Elias (PN–BERSATU)	8,806	50.67%	3,218	Saliza Ahmad (BN–UMNO)	5,588	32.15%	17,380	Muhammad Amin Zakaria (BN–UMNO)
N07	Batu Kurau	22,022	Mohd Najmuddin Elias (PN–BERSATU)	8,806	50.67%	3,218	Muhamad Aiman Aizuddin Md Husin (PH–PKR)	2,669	15.36%	17,380	Muhammad Amin Zakaria (BN–UMNO)
N07	Batu Kurau	22,022	Mohd Najmuddin Elias (PN–BERSATU)	8,806	50.67%	3,218	Zulkifli Yahya (GTA–BERJASA)	317	1.82%	17,380	Muhammad Amin Zakaria (BN–UMNO)
N08	Titi Serong	35,900	Hakimi Hamzi Hayat (PN–PAS)	13,565	47.85%	5,274	Muhammad Nakhaie Wahab (PH–AMANAH)	8,291	29.24%	28,353	Hasnul Zulkarnain Abdul Munaim (IND)
N08	Titi Serong	35,900	Hakimi Hamzi Hayat (PN–PAS)	13,565	47.85%	5,274	Shahrul Nizam Razali (BN–UMNO)	6,497	22.91%	28,353	Hasnul Zulkarnain Abdul Munaim (IND)
N09	Kuala Kurau	32,602	Abdul Yunus Jamahri (PN–BERSATU)	10,309	41.97%	1,347	Anuar Ahmad (PH–PKR)	8,962	36.49%	24,563	Abdul Yunus Jamahri (PN–BERSATU)
N09	Kuala Kurau	32,602	Abdul Yunus Jamahri (PN–BERSATU)	10,309	41.97%	1,347	Mohd Jamil Jahaya (BN–UMNO)	5,292	21.54%	24,563	Abdul Yunus Jamahri (PN–BERSATU)
N10	Alor Pongsu	28,656	Noor Azman Ghazali (PN–BERSATU)	10,622	47.78%	4,015	Sham Mat Sahat (BN–UMNO)	6,607	29.72%	22,233	Sham Mat Sahat (BN–UMNO)
N10	Alor Pongsu	28,656	Noor Azman Ghazali (PN–BERSATU)	10,622	47.78%	4,015	Khairul Azman Ahmad (PH–PKR)	5,004	22.51%	22,233	Sham Mat Sahat (BN–UMNO)
N11	Gunong Semanggol	27,396	Razman Zakaria (PN–PAS)	12,825	59.29%	7,466	Nazirul Jalamuddin (BN–UMNO)	5,359	24.77%	21,631	Razman Zakaria (PN–PAS)
N11	Gunong Semanggol	27,396	Razman Zakaria (PN–PAS)	12,825	59.29%	7,466	Sheikh Khuzaifah Sheikh Abu Bakar (PH–AMANAH)	3,447	15.94%	21,631	Razman Zakaria (PN–PAS)
N12	Selinsing	24,241	Salehuddin Abdullah (PN–PAS)	8,693	46.47%	3,279	Mohamad Noor Dawoo (BN–UMNO)	5,414	28.95%	18,704	Mohamad Noor Dawoo (BN–UMNO)
N12	Selinsing	24,241	Salehuddin Abdullah (PN–PAS)	8,693	46.47%	3,279	Ahmad Shaqif Ansarallah Ahmad Jihbaz Mokhlis (PH–AMANAH)	4,597	24.58%	18,704	Mohamad Noor Dawoo (BN–UMNO)
N13	Kuala Sepetang	40,222	Ahmad Man (PN–BERSATU)	12,582	41.33%	3,580	Zainal Azman Abu Seman (PH–PKR)	9,002	29.58%	30,437	Mohd Kamaruddin Abu Bakar (BN–UMNO)
N13	Kuala Sepetang	40,222	Ahmad Man (PN–BERSATU)	12,582	41.33%	3,580	Mohd Kamaruddin Abu Bakar (BN–UMNO)	8,687	28.54%	30,437	Mohd Kamaruddin Abu Bakar (BN–UMNO)
N13	Kuala Sepetang	40,222	Ahmad Man (PN–BERSATU)	12,582	41.33%	3,580	Norhaliza'awayati Meman (GTA–PUTRA)	166	0.55%	30,437	Mohd Kamaruddin Abu Bakar (BN–UMNO)
N14	Changkat Jering	37,003	Rahim Ismail (PN–PAS)	11,790	41.89%	3,151	Ahmad Saidi Mohamad Daud (BN–UMNO)	8,639	30.69%	28,148	Ahmad Saidi Mohamad Daud (BN–UMNO)
N14	Changkat Jering	37,003	Rahim Ismail (PN–PAS)	11,790	41.89%	3,151	Megat Shariffudin Ibrahim (PH–AMANAH)	7,511	26.68%	28,148	Ahmad Saidi Mohamad Daud (BN–UMNO)
N14	Changkat Jering	37,003	Rahim Ismail (PN–PAS)	11,790	41.89%	3,151	Nazar Talib (GTA–PEJUANG)	208	0.74%	28,148	Ahmad Saidi Mohamad Daud (BN–UMNO)
N15	Trong	17,028	Faisal Abdul Rahman (PN–PAS)	5,671	43.78%	616	Jamilah Zakaria (BN–UMNO)	5,055	39.01%	12,957	Jamilah Zakaria (BN–UMNO)
N15	Trong	17,028	Faisal Abdul Rahman (PN–PAS)	5,671	43.78%	616	Junaida Jamaludin (PH–PKR)	2,119	16.35%	12,957	Jamilah Zakaria (BN–UMNO)
N15	Trong	17,028	Faisal Abdul Rahman (PN–PAS)	5,671	43.78%	616	Mustafaa Kamal (GTA–PEJUANG)	112	0.86%	12,957	Jamilah Zakaria (BN–UMNO)
N16	Kamunting	39,850	Mohd Fakhruddin Abdul Aziz (PN–PAS)	13,045	43.97%	3,100	Muhd Fadhil Nuruddin (PH–AMANAH)	9,945	33.53%	29,664	Muhd Fadhil Nuruddin (PH–AMANAH)
N16	Kamunting	39,850	Mohd Fakhruddin Abdul Aziz (PN–PAS)	13,045	43.97%	3,100	Ahmad Shalimin Ahmad Shaffie (BN–UMNO)	6,674	22.50%	29,664	Muhd Fadhil Nuruddin (PH–AMANAH)
N17	Pokok Assam	36,513	Ong Seng Guan (PH–DAP)	16,726	67.36%	12,180	Shariful Juhari Abu Kassim (PN–BERSATU)	4,546	18.31%	24,829	Leow Thye Yih (PH–DAP)
N17	Pokok Assam	36,513	Ong Seng Guan (PH–DAP)	16,726	67.36%	12,180	Ang Sui Eng (BN–MCA)	2,660	10.71%	24,829	Leow Thye Yih (PH–DAP)
N17	Pokok Assam	36,513	Ong Seng Guan (PH–DAP)	16,726	67.36%	12,180	Leow Thye Yih (IND)	786	3.17%	24,829	Leow Thye Yih (PH–DAP)
N17	Pokok Assam	36,513	Ong Seng Guan (PH–DAP)	16,726	67.36%	12,180	Mohd Yusoff Abdull Hamid (IND)	111	0.45%	24,829	Leow Thye Yih (PH–DAP)
N18	Aulong	45,203	Teh Kok Lim (PH–DAP)	20,306	66.22%	14,857	Koay Boon Hui (PN–GERAKAN)	5,449	17.77%	30,665	Nga Kor Ming (PH–DAP)
N18	Aulong	45,203	Teh Kok Lim (PH–DAP)	20,306	66.22%	14,857	G Shanmugiavalloo (BN–MIC)	3,756	12.25%	30,665	Nga Kor Ming (PH–DAP)
N18	Aulong	45,203	Teh Kok Lim (PH–DAP)	20,306	66.22%	14,857	Lee Seng Yap (IND)	739	2.41%	30,665	Nga Kor Ming (PH–DAP)
N18	Aulong	45,203	Teh Kok Lim (PH–DAP)	20,306	66.22%	14,857	Abu Bakar Abdul Rahman (IND)	415	1.35%	30,665	Nga Kor Ming (PH–DAP)
N19	Chenderoh	17,782	Syed Lukman Hakim Syed Mohd Zin (PN–BERSATU)	5,342	39.44%	75	Khairuddin Mohamed Azahari (BN–UMNO)	5,267	38.89%	13,544	Zainun Mat Noor (BN–UMNO)
N19	Chenderoh	17,782	Syed Lukman Hakim Syed Mohd Zin (PN–BERSATU)	5,342	39.44%	75	Mohd Khairul Iwan Mat Khairi (PH–PKR)	2,803	20.70%	13,544	Zainun Mat Noor (BN–UMNO)
N19	Chenderoh	17,782	Syed Lukman Hakim Syed Mohd Zin (PN–BERSATU)	5,342	39.44%	75	Ahmad Rodzi Abdul Rahim (GTA–PEJUANG)	132	0.97%	13,544	Zainun Mat Noor (BN–UMNO)
N20	Lubok Merbau	20,904	Azizi Mohamed Ridzuan (PN–PAS)	7,722	47.18%	2,955	Mohamad Azir Ismail (BN–UMNO)	4,767	29.12%	16,369	Jurij Jalaluddin (BN–UMNO)
N20	Lubok Merbau	20,904	Azizi Mohamed Ridzuan (PN–PAS)	7,722	47.18%	2,955	Zaiton Latiff (PH–AMANAH)	3,880	23.70%	16,369	Jurij Jalaluddin (BN–UMNO)
N21	Lintang	33,107	Mohd Zolkafly Harun (BN–UMNO)	12,025	48.43%	5,280	Ahmad Daslie Osman (PN–BERSATU)	6,745	27.16%	24,831	Mohd Zolkafly Harun (BN–UMNO)
N21	Lintang	33,107	Mohd Zolkafly Harun (BN–UMNO)	12,025	48.43%	5,280	Za'im Sidqi Zulkifly (PH–PKR)	6,061	24.41%	24,831	Mohd Zolkafly Harun (BN–UMNO)
N22	Jalong	39,288	Loh Sze Yee (PH–DAP)	15,955	59.07%	8,713	Pan Chean Chang (BN–MCA)	7,242	26.82%	27,007	Loh Sze Yee (PH–DAP)
N22	Jalong	39,288	Loh Sze Yee (PH–DAP)	15,955	59.07%	8,713	Naran Singh Asa Singh (PN–GERAKAN)	3,043	11.27%	27,007	Loh Sze Yee (PH–DAP)
N22	Jalong	39,288	Loh Sze Yee (PH–DAP)	15,955	59.07%	8,713	R Indrani (IND)	767	2.84%	27,007	Loh Sze Yee (PH–DAP)
N23	Manjoi	86,266	Hafez Sabri (PN–PAS)	29,852	44.14%	6,768	Asmuni Awi (PH–AMANAH)	23,084	34.13%	67,635	Asmuni Awi (PH–AMANAH)
N23	Manjoi	86,266	Hafez Sabri (PN–PAS)	29,852	44.14%	6,768	Azizul Kama Abd Aziz (BN–UMNO)	14,699	21.73%	67,635	Asmuni Awi (PH–AMANAH)
N24	Hulu Kinta	74,292	Muhamad Arafat Varisai Mahamad (PH–PKR)	22,220	39.03%	4,163	Puteri Holijah Muhamad Rali (PN–BERSATU)	18,057	31.71%	56,938	Muhamad Arafat Varisai Mahamad (PH–PKR)
N24	Hulu Kinta	74,292	Muhamad Arafat Varisai Mahamad (PH–PKR)	22,220	39.03%	4,163	Mazlan Abdul Rahman (BN–UMNO)	16,224	28.49%	56,938	Muhamad Arafat Varisai Mahamad (PH–PKR)
N24	Hulu Kinta	74,292	Muhamad Arafat Varisai Mahamad (PH–PKR)	22,220	39.03%	4,163	Murugiah Subramaniam (IND)	437	0.77%	56,938	Muhamad Arafat Varisai Mahamad (PH–PKR)
N25	Canning	41,021	Jenny Choy Tsi Jen (PH–DAP)	22,527	87.11%	20,734	Woo Kok Toong (BN–MCA)	1,793	6.93%	25,862	Jenny Choy Tsi Jen (PH–DAP)
N25	Canning	41,021	Jenny Choy Tsi Jen (PH–DAP)	22,527	87.11%	20,734	Pang Boon Yang (PN–GERAKAN)	1,542	5.96%	25,862	Jenny Choy Tsi Jen (PH–DAP)
N26	Tebing Tinggi	37,223	Abdul Aziz Bari (PH–DAP)	11,286	40.58%	660	Mohammad Iskandar Abdul Rahman (PN–BERSATU)	10,626	38.21%	27,811	Abdul Aziz Bari (PH–DAP)
N26	Tebing Tinggi	37,223	Abdul Aziz Bari (PH–DAP)	11,286	40.58%	660	Khoo Boon Chuan (BN–MCA)	5,705	20.51%	27,811	Abdul Aziz Bari (PH–DAP)
N26	Tebing Tinggi	37,223	Abdul Aziz Bari (PH–DAP)	11,286	40.58%	660	Mior Nor Haidir Suhaimi (GTA–PEJUANG)	194	0.70%	27,811	Abdul Aziz Bari (PH–DAP)
N27	Pasir Pinji	39,934	Goh See Hua (PH–DAP)	23,692	90.46%	22,169	Soo Poh Yeow (BN–MCA)	1,523	5.82%	26,188	Goh See Hua (PH–DAP)
N27	Pasir Pinji	39,934	Goh See Hua (PH–DAP)	23,692	90.46%	22,169	Lam Kin Yip (PN–GERAKAN)	973	3.72%	26,188	Goh See Hua (PH–DAP)
N28	Bercham	52,750	Ong Boon Piow (PH–DAP)	29,596	81.24%	26,114	Hoo Wai Mun (BN–MCA)	3,482	9.56%	36,429	Ong Boon Piow (PH–DAP)
N28	Bercham	52,750	Ong Boon Piow (PH–DAP)	29,596	81.24%	26,114	Lim Jin Sheng (PN–GERAKAN)	3,351	9.20%	36,429	Ong Boon Piow (PH–DAP)
N29	Kepayang	25,190	Nga Kor Ming (PH–DAP)	11,977	72.60%	9,491	Richard Ng (PN–BERSATU)	2,486	15.07%	16,498	Ko Chung Sen (PH–DAP)
N29	Kepayang	25,190	Nga Kor Ming (PH–DAP)	11,977	72.60%	9,491	Lim Huey Shan (BN–MCA)	2,035	12.33%	16,498	Ko Chung Sen (PH–DAP)
N30	Buntong	36,714	Thulsi Thivani Manogaran (PH–DAP)	21,412	84.02%	19,155	MS Jayagopi (BN–MIC)	2,257	8.86%	25,483	Sivasubramaniam Athinarayanan (PN–BERSATU)
N30	Buntong	36,714	Thulsi Thivani Manogaran (PH–DAP)	21,412	84.02%	19,155	Sivasubramaniam Athinarayanan (PN–BERSATU)	1,437	5.64%	25,483	Sivasubramaniam Athinarayanan (PN–BERSATU)
N30	Buntong	36,714	Thulsi Thivani Manogaran (PH–DAP)	21,412	84.02%	19,155	Iruthiyam Sebastiar Anthonisamy (IND)	237	0.93%	25,483	Sivasubramaniam Athinarayanan (PN–BERSATU)
N30	Buntong	36,714	Thulsi Thivani Manogaran (PH–DAP)	21,412	84.02%	19,155	Muhammad Faiz Abdullah (IND)	140	0.55%	25,483	Sivasubramaniam Athinarayanan (PN–BERSATU)
N31	Jelapang	35,088	Cheah Pou Hian (PH–DAP)	21,554	88.71%	20,111	Hamidah Muhamad (BN–MMSP)	1,443	5.94%	24,296	Cheah Pou Hian (PH–DAP)
N31	Jelapang	35,088	Cheah Pou Hian (PH–DAP)	21,554	88.71%	20,111	Navinten Sundarajan (PN–PAS)	1,299	5.35%	24,296	Cheah Pou Hian (PH–DAP)
N32	Menglembu	38,689	Chaw Kam Foon (PH–DAP)	22,875	87.93%	21,191	Phon Kai Mun (BN–MCA)	1,684	6.47%	26,015	Chaw Kam Foon (PH–DAP)
N32	Menglembu	38,689	Chaw Kam Foon (PH–DAP)	22,875	87.93%	21,191	Wong Kean Rong (PN–BERSATU)	1,456	5.60%	26,015	Chaw Kam Foon (PH–DAP)
N33	Tronoh	38,119	Tiw Tee Siang (PH–DAP)	15,602	63.35%	11,372	Sin Koon Yen (PN–GERAKAN)	4,230	17.17%	24,630	Paul Yong Choo Kiong (PBM)
N33	Tronoh	38,119	Tiw Tee Siang (PH–DAP)	15,602	63.35%	11,372	Leong Chee Wai (BN–MCA)	3,351	13.61%	24,630	Paul Yong Choo Kiong (PBM)
N33	Tronoh	38,119	Tiw Tee Siang (PH–DAP)	15,602	63.35%	11,372	Bryan Yong Wu Shen (PBM)	710	2.88%	24,630	Paul Yong Choo Kiong (PBM)
N33	Tronoh	38,119	Tiw Tee Siang (PH–DAP)	15,602	63.35%	11,372	Roslan Ismail (GTA–PEJUANG)	478	1.94%	24,630	Paul Yong Choo Kiong (PBM)
N33	Tronoh	38,119	Tiw Tee Siang (PH–DAP)	15,602	63.35%	11,372	Meor Shahimudin Hasim (IND)	259	1.05%	24,630	Paul Yong Choo Kiong (PBM)
N34	Bukit Chandan	22,194	Hashim Bujang (PN–BERSATU)	6,550	38.43%	1,164	Azizul Rahim Abd Rahman (BN–UMNO)	5,386	31.60%	17,044	Maslin Sham Razman (BN–UMNO)
N34	Bukit Chandan	22,194	Hashim Bujang (PN–BERSATU)	6,550	38.43%	1,164	Mohamad Hairul Amir Sabri (PH–PKR)	5,108	29.97%	17,044	Maslin Sham Razman (BN–UMNO)
N35	Manong	24,791	Burhanuddin Ahmad (PN–PAS)	8,220	44.04%	2,912	Mustafa Shah Abdul Hamid (BN–UMNO)	5,308	28.44%	18,665	Mohamad Zuraimi Razali (BN–UMNO)
N35	Manong	24,791	Burhanuddin Ahmad (PN–PAS)	8,220	44.04%	2,912	Mohd Jamsari Mahamood (PH–AMANAH)	5,137	27.52%	18,665	Mohamad Zuraimi Razali (BN–UMNO)
N36	Pengaklan Baharu	22,573	Azman Noh (BN–UMNO)	6,665	40.58%	1,076	Ahmad Faisal Mansor (PN–BERSATU)	5,589	34.03%	16,424	Abdul Manaf Hashim (BN–UMNO)
N36	Pengaklan Baharu	22,573	Azman Noh (BN–UMNO)	6,665	40.58%	1,076	Abul Jais Ashfaq Ahmed (PH–PKR)	4,045	24.63%	16,424	Abdul Manaf Hashim (BN–UMNO)
N36	Pengaklan Baharu	22,573	Azman Noh (BN–UMNO)	6,665	40.58%	1,076	Abdul Halim Mat Isa (GTA–PEJUANG)	125	0.76%	16,424	Abdul Manaf Hashim (BN–UMNO)
N37	Pantai Remis	44,432	Wong May Ing (PH–DAP)	20,840	72.24%	16,432	Looi Tuan Gin (BN–MCA)	4,408	15.28%	28,848	Wong May Ing (PH–DAP)
N37	Pantai Remis	44,432	Wong May Ing (PH–DAP)	20,840	72.24%	16,432	Eee Chin Oon (PN–GERAKAN)	3,600	12.48%	28,848	Wong May Ing (PH–DAP)
N38	Astaka	41,244	Jason Ng Thien Yeong (PH–DAP)	21,128	78.16%	17,835	Chieng Lee Chong (BN–MCA)	3,293	12.18%	27,033	Teoh Yee Chern (PH–DAP)
N38	Astaka	41,244	Jason Ng Thien Yeong (PH–DAP)	21,128	78.16%	17,835	Yong Il Yan (PN–GERAKAN)	2,612	9.66%	27,033	Teoh Yee Chern (PH–DAP)
N39	Belanja	17,767	Khairudin Abu Hanipah (BN–UMNO)	6,374	47.03%	1,223	Wan Meor Safwat Naqiuddin Shamsudin (PN–BERSATU)	5,151	38.01%	13,552	Khairudin Abu Hanipah (BN–UMNO)
N39	Belanja	17,767	Khairudin Abu Hanipah (BN–UMNO)	6,374	47.03%	1,223	Hishamuddin Abdullah (PH–AMANAH)	1,881	13.88%	13,552	Khairudin Abu Hanipah (BN–UMNO)
N39	Belanja	17,767	Khairudin Abu Hanipah (BN–UMNO)	6,374	47.03%	1,223	Shaharuzzaman Bistamam (GTA–BERJASA)	146	1.08%	13,552	Khairudin Abu Hanipah (BN–UMNO)
N40	Bota	30,148	Najihatussalehah Ahmad (PN–PAS)	11,275	47.09%	1,963	Khairul Shahril Mohamed (BN–UMNO)	9,312	38.89%	23,943	Khairul Shahril Mohamed (BN–UMNO)
N40	Bota	30,148	Najihatussalehah Ahmad (PN–PAS)	11,275	47.09%	1,963	Usaili Alias (PH–PKR)	3,138	13.11%	23,943	Khairul Shahril Mohamed (BN–UMNO)
N40	Bota	30,148	Najihatussalehah Ahmad (PN–PAS)	11,275	47.09%	1,963	Mohd Shahril Harahab Abdul Halil (GTA–PUTRA)	218	0.91%	23,943	Khairul Shahril Mohamed (BN–UMNO)
N41	Malim Nawar	29,701	Bavani Veraiah @ Shasha (PH–DAP)	10,905	58.58%	7,259	Chin Woon Kheong (BN–MCA)	3,646	19.58%	18,618	Leong Cheok Keng (PBM)
N41	Malim Nawar	29,701	Bavani Veraiah @ Shasha (PH–DAP)	10,905	58.58%	7,259	Sharifah Aemeera Najwa Syed Mohamed (PN–BERSATU)	3,383	18.17%	18,618	Leong Cheok Keng (PBM)
N41	Malim Nawar	29,701	Bavani Veraiah @ Shasha (PH–DAP)	10,905	58.58%	7,259	Leong Cheok Keng (WARISAN)	684	3.67%	18,618	Leong Cheok Keng (PBM)
N42	Keranji	28,248	Angeline Koo Hai Yen (PH–DAP)	12,201	69.46%	8,749	Ng Wah Leng (BN–MCA)	3,452	19.65%	17,566	Chong Zhemin (PH–DAP)
N42	Keranji	28,248	Angeline Koo Hai Yen (PH–DAP)	12,201	69.46%	8,749	Foong Kar Sing (PN–GERAKAN)	1,803	10.26%	17,566	Chong Zhemin (PH–DAP)
N42	Keranji	28,248	Angeline Koo Hai Yen (PH–DAP)	12,201	69.46%	8,749	Puah Chee Haur (WARISAN)	110	0.63%	17,566	Chong Zhemin (PH–DAP)
N43	Tualang Sekah	31,945	Mohd Azlan Helmi (PH–PKR)	8,025	34.41%	253	Pazli Abdullah Sani (PN–BERSATU)	7,772	33.33%	23,321	Nolee Ashilin Mohamed Radzi (PN–BERSATU)
N43	Tualang Sekah	31,945	Mohd Azlan Helmi (PH–PKR)	8,025	34.41%	253	Abd Rahman Md Som (BN–UMNO)	7,524	32.26%	23,321	Nolee Ashilin Mohamed Radzi (PN–BERSATU)
N44	Sungai Rapat	47,931	Mohammad Nizar Jamaluddin (PH–AMANAH)	15,065	41.92%	3,494	Mohader Ahmad Mohammad Ayob (PN–BERSATU)	11,571	32.19%	35,942	Mohammad Nizar Jamaluddin (PH–AMANAH)
N44	Sungai Rapat	47,931	Mohammad Nizar Jamaluddin (PH–AMANAH)	15,065	41.92%	3,494	Hang Tuah Din @ Mohamed Din (BN–UMNO)	9,152	25.46%	35,942	Mohammad Nizar Jamaluddin (PH–AMANAH)
N44	Sungai Rapat	47,931	Mohammad Nizar Jamaluddin (PH–AMANAH)	15,065	41.92%	3,494	Roshanita Mohd Bashir (WARISAN)	154	0.43%	35,942	Mohammad Nizar Jamaluddin (PH–AMANAH)
N45	Simpang Pulai	62,756	Wong Chai Yi (PH–PKR)	30,676	69.18%	23,273	Selvam Kunjambu (PN–BERSATU)	7,403	16.69%	44,345	Tan Kar Hing (PH–PKR)
N45	Simpang Pulai	62,756	Wong Chai Yi (PH–PKR)	30,676	69.18%	23,273	Lee Wai Yin (BN–MCA)	5,956	13.43%	44,345	Tan Kar Hing (PH–PKR)
N45	Simpang Pulai	62,756	Wong Chai Yi (PH–PKR)	30,676	69.18%	23,273	Hooi Mi Suet (WARISAN)	310	0.70%	44,345	Tan Kar Hing (PH–PKR)
N46	Teja	32,970	Sandrea Ng Shy Ching (PH–PKR)	10,814	46.50%	4,555	Liew Yee Lin (BN–MCA)	6,259	26.91%	23,257	Sandrea Ng Shy Ching (PH–PKR)
N46	Teja	32,970	Sandrea Ng Shy Ching (PH–PKR)	10,814	46.50%	4,555	Ahmad Ishak (PN–BERSATU)	5,794	24.91%	23,257	Sandrea Ng Shy Ching (PH–PKR)
N46	Teja	32,970	Sandrea Ng Shy Ching (PH–PKR)	10,814	46.50%	4,555	Aswannudin Hariffudin (GTA–PEJUANG)	214	0.92%	23,257	Sandrea Ng Shy Ching (PH–PKR)
N46	Teja	32,970	Sandrea Ng Shy Ching (PH–PKR)	10,814	46.50%	4,555	Low Leong Sin (WARISAN)	176	0.76%	23,257	Sandrea Ng Shy Ching (PH–PKR)
N47	Chenderiang	30,006	Choong Sin Heng (BN–MCA)	8,406	39.85%	2,251	Atyrah Hanim Razali (PH–PKR)	6,155	29.19%	21,088	Ahmad Faizal Azumu (PN–BERSATU)
N47	Chenderiang	30,006	Choong Sin Heng (BN–MCA)	8,406	39.85%	2,251	Mohd Yunus Mohd Yusop (PN–BERSATU)	4,862	23.06%	21,088	Ahmad Faizal Azumu (PN–BERSATU)
N47	Chenderiang	30,006	Choong Sin Heng (BN–MCA)	8,406	39.85%	2,251	Teratai Bah Arom (IND)	1,070	5.07%	21,088	Ahmad Faizal Azumu (PN–BERSATU)
N47	Chenderiang	30,006	Choong Sin Heng (BN–MCA)	8,406	39.85%	2,251	Atan Katering (IND)	368	1.75%	21,088	Ahmad Faizal Azumu (PN–BERSATU)
N47	Chenderiang	30,006	Choong Sin Heng (BN–MCA)	8,406	39.85%	2,251	Mohd. Amin Man (GTA–PEJUANG)	134	0.64%	21,088	Ahmad Faizal Azumu (PN–BERSATU)
N47	Chenderiang	30,006	Choong Sin Heng (BN–MCA)	8,406	39.85%	2,251	Ahmad Tarmizi Mohd Ghazali (WARISAN)	93	0.44%	21,088	Ahmad Faizal Azumu (PN–BERSATU)
N48	Ayer Kuning	31,940	Isham Shahruddin (BN–UMNO)	9,088	38.72%	2,213	Mohd Nazri Hashim (PH–AMANAH)	6,875	29.30%	23,466	Samsudin Abu Hassan (BN–UMNO)
N48	Ayer Kuning	31,940	Isham Shahruddin (BN–UMNO)	9,088	38.72%	2,213	Muhammad Noor Farid Zainal (PN–PAS)	6,812	29.03%	23,466	Samsudin Abu Hassan (BN–UMNO)
N48	Ayer Kuning	31,940	Isham Shahruddin (BN–UMNO)	9,088	38.72%	2,213	Bawani Kaniappan (PSM)	586	2.50%	23,466	Samsudin Abu Hassan (BN–UMNO)
N48	Ayer Kuning	31,940	Isham Shahruddin (BN–UMNO)	9,088	38.72%	2,213	Maziah Salim (GTA–PEJUANG)	105	0.45%	23,466	Samsudin Abu Hassan (BN–UMNO)
N49	Sungai Manik	35,520	Zainol Fadzi Paharudin (PN–BERSATU)	11,610	43.94%	3,950	Mohamad Maharani Md Tasi (PH–PKR)	7,660	28.99%	26,424	Zainol Fadzi Paharudin (PN–BERSATU)
N49	Sungai Manik	35,520	Zainol Fadzi Paharudin (PN–BERSATU)	11,610	43.94%	3,950	Ibrahim Katop (BN–UMNO)	7,154	27.07%	26,424	Zainol Fadzi Paharudin (PN–BERSATU)
N50	Kampong Gajah	39,241	Zafarulazlan Zan (PN–PAS)	15,634	51.03%	3,757	Wan Norashikin Wan Noordin (BN–UMNO)	11,877	38.77%	30,634	Wan Norashikin Wan Noordin (BN–UMNO)
N50	Kampong Gajah	39,241	Zafarulazlan Zan (PN–PAS)	15,634	51.03%	3,757	Mohd Syamsul Alauddin (PH–AMANAH)	2,824	9.22%	30,634	Wan Norashikin Wan Noordin (BN–UMNO)
N50	Kampong Gajah	39,241	Zafarulazlan Zan (PN–PAS)	15,634	51.03%	3,757	Mohd Safian Sauri Pandak Abd Samad (GTA–PUTRA)	299	0.98%	30,634	Wan Norashikin Wan Noordin (BN–UMNO)
N51	Pasir Panjang	62,418	Rosli Abd Rahman (PN–PAS)	20,182	41.05%	5,117	Yahaya Mat Nor (PH–AMANAH)	15,065	30.64%	49,161	Yahaya Mat Nor (PH–AMANAH)
N51	Pasir Panjang	62,418	Rosli Abd Rahman (PN–PAS)	20,182	41.05%	5,117	Mohd Rafiq Mohd (BN–UMNO)	13,301	27.06%	49,161	Yahaya Mat Nor (PH–AMANAH)
N51	Pasir Panjang	62,418	Rosli Abd Rahman (PN–PAS)	20,182	41.05%	5,117	Mohd Norazlee Mohd Alias (GTA–PUTRA)	339	0.69%	49,161	Yahaya Mat Nor (PH–AMANAH)
N51	Pasir Panjang	62,418	Rosli Abd Rahman (PN–PAS)	20,182	41.05%	5,117	Nur Inderasyawalis Ahmad Mukhtar (WARISAN)	274	0.56%	49,161	Yahaya Mat Nor (PH–AMANAH)
N52	Pangkor	30,554	Norhaslinda Zakaria (PN–BERSATU)	8,507	38.66%	1,011	Norazman Man (BN–UMNO)	7,496	34.06%	22,008	Zambry Abdul Kadir (BN–UMNO)
N52	Pangkor	30,554	Norhaslinda Zakaria (PN–BERSATU)	8,507	38.66%	1,011	Abdul Razak Nazri (PH–PKR)	5,654	25.69%	22,008	Zambry Abdul Kadir (BN–UMNO)
N52	Pangkor	30,554	Norhaslinda Zakaria (PN–BERSATU)	8,507	38.66%	1,011	Mohd Azlan Suhaimi (GTA–PUTRA)	181	0.82%	22,008	Zambry Abdul Kadir (BN–UMNO)
N52	Pangkor	30,554	Norhaslinda Zakaria (PN–BERSATU)	8,507	38.66%	1,011	Yahaya Ahmad (WARISAN)	170	0.77%	22,008	Zambry Abdul Kadir (BN–UMNO)
N53	Rungkup	19,670	Shahrul Zaman Yahya (BN–UMNO)	7,023	49.55%	3,409	Ahmad Munzirie Ahmad Khabir (PH–AMANAH)	3,614	25.50%	14,174	Shahrul Zaman Yahya (BN–UMNO)
N53	Rungkup	19,670	Shahrul Zaman Yahya (BN–UMNO)	7,023	49.55%	3,409	Mohd Mokheri Jalil (PN–PAS)	3,537	24.95%	14,174	Shahrul Zaman Yahya (BN–UMNO)
N54	Hutan Melintang	38,513	Wasanthee Sinnasamy (PH–PKR)	11,924	43.05%	1,130	Khairuddin Tarmizi (BN–UMNO)	10,794	38.98%	27,694	Khairuddin Tarmizi (BN–UMNO)
N54	Hutan Melintang	38,513	Wasanthee Sinnasamy (PH–PKR)	11,924	43.05%	1,130	Khairun Nizam Marsom (PN–BERSATU)	4,976	17.97%	27,694	Khairuddin Tarmizi (BN–UMNO)
N55	Pasir Bedemar	39,117	Woo Kah Leong (PH–DAP)	21,061	76.64%	17,446	Kong Sun Chin (BN–MCA)	3,615	13.16%	27,479	Terence Naidu (PH–DAP)
N55	Pasir Bedemar	39,117	Woo Kah Leong (PH–DAP)	21,061	76.64%	17,446	Suriyananarayanan Sannasy Naidu (PN–PAS)	2,803	10.20%	27,479	Terence Naidu (PH–DAP)
N56	Changkat Jong	48,105	Nadziruddin Mohamed Bandi (PN–BERSATU)	13,232	36.02%	1,087	Badrul Hisham Badarudin (PH–DAP)	12,145	33.06%	36,733	Mohd Azhar Jamaluddin (BN–UMNO)
N56	Changkat Jong	48,105	Nadziruddin Mohamed Bandi (PN–BERSATU)	13,232	36.02%	1,087	Mohd Azhar Jamaluddin (BN–UMNO)	11,044	30.07%	36,733	Mohd Azhar Jamaluddin (BN–UMNO)
N56	Changkat Jong	48,105	Nadziruddin Mohamed Bandi (PN–BERSATU)	13,232	36.02%	1,087	Muhammad Amirul Mahfuz Abdullah (GTA–PUTRA)	312	0.85%	36,733	Mohd Azhar Jamaluddin (BN–UMNO)
N57	Sungkai	23,375	Sivanesan Achalingam (PH–DAP)	9,549	58.98%	5,238	Elango Vadiveloo (BN–MIC)	4,311	26.62%	16,192	Sivanesan Achalingam (PH–DAP)
N57	Sungkai	23,375	Sivanesan Achalingam (PH–DAP)	9,549	58.98%	5,238	Thilak Raj Gunasekaran (PN–PAS)	1,744	10.77%	16,192	Sivanesan Achalingam (PH–DAP)
N57	Sungkai	23,375	Sivanesan Achalingam (PH–DAP)	9,549	58.98%	5,238	Mahhadee Ramli (IND)	588	3.63%	16,192	Sivanesan Achalingam (PH–DAP)
N58	Slim	30,581	Muhammad Zulfadli Zainal (PN–PAS)	9,153	38.87%	416	Mohd Zaidi Aziz (BN–UMNO)	8,737	37.11%	23,546	Mohd Zaidi Aziz (BN–UMNO)
N58	Slim	30,581	Muhammad Zulfadli Zainal (PN–PAS)	9,153	38.87%	416	Mohd Syahid Mohd Zaini (PH–PKR)	5,455	23.17%	23,546	Mohd Zaidi Aziz (BN–UMNO)
N58	Slim	30,581	Muhammad Zulfadli Zainal (PN–PAS)	9,153	38.87%	416	Meor Muhammad Azim Meor Aznam (GTA–BERJASA)	201	0.85%	23,546	Mohd Zaidi Aziz (BN–UMNO)
N59	Behrang	39,917	Salina Samsudin (BN–UMNO)	10,337	34.42%	202	Khairol Najib Hashim (PH–AMANAH)	10,135	33.75%	30,029	Aminuddin Zulkipli (PH–AMANAH)
N59	Behrang	39,917	Salina Samsudin (BN–UMNO)	10,337	34.42%	202	Mohd Amran Ibrahim (PN–BERSATU)	9,240	30.77%	30,029	Aminuddin Zulkipli (PH–AMANAH)
N59	Behrang	39,917	Salina Samsudin (BN–UMNO)	10,337	34.42%	202	Hazvee Hafiz (GTA–PUTRA)	317	1.06%	30,029	Aminuddin Zulkipli (PH–AMANAH)

=== Pahang ===
#	Constituency	Registered Electors	Winner	Votes	Votes %	Majority	Opponent(s)	Votes	Votes %	Total valid votes	Incumbent
N01	Tanah Rata	26,838	Ho Chi Yang (PH–DAP)	9,856	53.05%	2,484	Wong Yap Wah (BN–MCA)	7,372	39.67%	18,581	Chiong Yoke Kong (PH–DAP)
N01	Tanah Rata	26,838	Ho Chi Yang (PH–DAP)	9,856	53.05%	2,484	Lai Chii Wen (PN–GERAKAN)	1,353	7.28%	18,581	Chiong Yoke Kong (PH–DAP)
N02	Jelai	19,182	Wan Rosdy Wan Ismail (BN–UMNO)	10,092	68.81%	6,983	Abdul Rasid Mohamed Ali (PN–BERSATU)	3,109	21.20%	14,666	Wan Rosdy Wan Ismail (BN–UMNO)
N02	Jelai	19,182	Wan Rosdy Wan Ismail (BN–UMNO)	10,092	68.81%	6,983	Ismail Mohd Hussin (PH–PKR)	1,465	9.99%	14,666	Wan Rosdy Wan Ismail (BN–UMNO)
N03	Padang Tengku	19,407	Mustapa Long (BN–UMNO)	7,198	47.15%	507	Muhamed Khaider Kamil (PN–PAS)	6,691	43.82%	15,268	Mustapa Long (BN–UMNO)
N03	Padang Tengku	19,407	Mustapa Long (BN–UMNO)	7,198	47.15%	507	Ruzi @ Nata Yusuff (PH–AMANAH)	1,203	7.88%	15,268	Mustapa Long (BN–UMNO)
N03	Padang Tengku	19,407	Mustapa Long (BN–UMNO)	7,198	47.15%	507	Mohd Rostam Mustapha (GTA–PEJUANG)	176	1.15%	15,268	Mustapa Long (BN–UMNO)
N04	Cheka	16,822	Tuan Ibrahim Tuan Man (PN–PAS)	5,634	45.51%	1,223	Ho Fong Mee (BN–MCA)	4,411	35.63%	12,381	Lee Ah Wong (BN–MCA)
N04	Cheka	16,822	Tuan Ibrahim Tuan Man (PN–PAS)	5,634	45.51%	1,223	Rasid Muhamad (PH–PKR)	2,255	18.21%	12,381	Lee Ah Wong (BN–MCA)
N04	Cheka	16,822	Tuan Ibrahim Tuan Man (PN–PAS)	5,634	45.51%	1,223	Aishaton Abu Bakar (GTA–PEJUANG)	81	0.65%	12,381	Lee Ah Wong (BN–MCA)
N05	Benta	10,895	Mohd. Soffi Abd. Razak (BN–UMNO)	3,948	48.21%	1,521	Rizal Jamin (PH–PKR)	2,427	29.64%	8,189	Mohd. Soffi Abd. Razak (BN–UMNO)
N05	Benta	10,895	Mohd. Soffi Abd. Razak (BN–UMNO)	3,948	48.21%	1,521	Embong Lias (PN–BERSATU)	1,814	22.15%	8,189	Mohd. Soffi Abd. Razak (BN–UMNO)
N06	Batu Talam	19,683	Abdul Aziz Mat Kiram (BN–UMNO)	7,992	52.99%	2,869	Ahmad Sabri Mat Dui (PN–BERSATU)	5,123	33.96%	15,084	Abdul Aziz Mat Kiram (BN–UMNO)
N06	Batu Talam	19,683	Abdul Aziz Mat Kiram (BN–UMNO)	7,992	52.99%	2,869	Shahuddin Abdul Rahman (PH–PKR)	1,969	13.05%	15,084	Abdul Aziz Mat Kiram (BN–UMNO)
N07	Tras	38,329	Tengku Zulpuri Shah Raja Puji (PH–DAP)	17,255	62.32%	11,397	Lim Teck Hoe (BN–MCA)	5,858	21.16%	27,686	Chow Yu Hui (PH–DAP)
N07	Tras	38,329	Tengku Zulpuri Shah Raja Puji (PH–DAP)	17,255	62.32%	11,397	Amirul Mukminin Kuek Abdullah (PN–GERAKAN)	4,233	15.29%	27,686	Chow Yu Hui (PH–DAP)
N07	Tras	38,329	Tengku Zulpuri Shah Raja Puji (PH–DAP)	17,255	62.32%	11,397	Mohd Tahir Kassim (GTA–PUTRA)	340	1.23%	27,686	Chow Yu Hui (PH–DAP)
N08	Dong	17,052	Fadzli Mohamad Kamal (BN–UMNO)	6,142	45.34%	1,046	Tengku Shah Amir Tengku Perang (PN–PAS)	5,096	37.62%	13,547	Shahiruddin Ab Moin (BN–UMNO)
N08	Dong	17,052	Fadzli Mohamad Kamal (BN–UMNO)	6,142	45.34%	1,046	Mohd Abd Jawaad Abd Ghafar @ Ramzin (PH–AMANAH)	2,309	17.04%	13,547	Shahiruddin Ab Moin (BN–UMNO)
N09	Tahan	20,895	Mohd Zakhwan Ahmad Badarddin (PN–PAS)	8,777	53.97%	2,014	Faezah Ishak (BN–UMNO)	6,763	41.58%	16,264	Mohd Zakhwan Ahmad Badarddin (PN–PAS)
N09	Tahan	20,895	Mohd Zakhwan Ahmad Badarddin (PN–PAS)	8,777	53.97%	2,014	Mohd Abd Talib Mohd Tahar (PH–AMANAH)	724	4.45%	16,264	Mohd Zakhwan Ahmad Badarddin (PN–PAS)
N10	Damak	34,967	Zuridan Md Daud (PN–PAS)	10,883	41.53%	2,296	Mohamad Rafly Mohd Satar (PH–PKR)	8,587	32.77%	26,207	Zuridan Md Daud (PN–PAS)
N10	Damak	34,967	Zuridan Md Daud (PN–PAS)	10,883	41.53%	2,296	Muhamad Fasal Jamlus (BN–UMNO)	6,655	25.39%	26,207	Zuridan Md Daud (PN–PAS)
N10	Damak	34,967	Zuridan Md Daud (PN–PAS)	10,883	41.53%	2,296	Izzuddin Ismail (IND)	82	0.31%	26,207	Zuridan Md Daud (PN–PAS)
N11	Pulau Tawar	31,189	Yohanis Ahmad (PN–PAS)	12,986	53.73%	3,487	Nazri Ngah (BN–UMNO)	9,499	39.30%	24,170	Nazri Ngah (BN–UMNO)
N11	Pulau Tawar	31,189	Yohanis Ahmad (PN–PAS)	12,986	53.73%	3,487	Norani Muhd @ Mohd Arshad (PH–AMANAH)	1,091	4.51%	24,170	Nazri Ngah (BN–UMNO)
N11	Pulau Tawar	31,189	Yohanis Ahmad (PN–PAS)	12,986	53.73%	3,487	Ridzuan Mansor (IND)	544	2.25%	24,170	Nazri Ngah (BN–UMNO)
N11	Pulau Tawar	31,189	Yohanis Ahmad (PN–PAS)	12,986	53.73%	3,487	Mohd Rosidi Hassan (GTA–PEJUANG)	50	0.21%	24,170	Nazri Ngah (BN–UMNO)
N12	Beserah	59,370	Andansura Rabu (PN–PAS)	23,867	51.80%	11,521	Zulkifli Mohamed (PH–AMANAH)	12,346	26.79%	46,079	Andansura Rabu (PN–PAS)
N12	Beserah	59,370	Andansura Rabu (PN–PAS)	23,867	51.80%	11,521	Mustaffar Kamal Ab Hamid (BN–UMNO)	9,346	20.28%	46,079	Andansura Rabu (PN–PAS)
N12	Beserah	59,370	Andansura Rabu (PN–PAS)	23,867	51.80%	11,521	Mohd Pauzi Taib (GTA–PEJUANG)	394	0.86%	46,079	Andansura Rabu (PN–PAS)
N12	Beserah	59,370	Andansura Rabu (PN–PAS)	23,867	51.80%	11,521	Joseph Tang (IND)	126	0.27%	46,079	Andansura Rabu (PN–PAS)
N13	Semambu	61,179	Chan Chun Kang (PH–PKR)	18,902	40.01%	1,804	Zulfadhli Zakariah (PN–PAS)	17,098	36.19%	47,242	Lee Chean Chung (PH–PKR)
N13	Semambu	61,179	Chan Chun Kang (PH–PKR)	18,902	40.01%	1,804	Khairul Hisham Omar (BN–UMNO)	10,422	22.06%	47,242	Lee Chean Chung (PH–PKR)
N13	Semambu	61,179	Chan Chun Kang (PH–PKR)	18,902	40.01%	1,804	Rashidah Abd Rahman (GTA–BERJASA)	820	1.74%	47,242	Lee Chean Chung (PH–PKR)
N14	Teruntum	30,854	Sim Chon Siang (PH–PKR)	12,983	58.63%	8,679	Tee Choon Ser (BN–MCA)	4,304	19.44%	22,143	Sim Chon Siang (PH–PKR)
N14	Teruntum	30,854	Sim Chon Siang (PH–PKR)	12,983	58.63%	8,679	Yap Kim Heng (PN–GERAKAN)	3,676	16.60%	22,143	Sim Chon Siang (PH–PKR)
N14	Teruntum	30,854	Sim Chon Siang (PH–PKR)	12,983	58.63%	8,679	Khairul Afifie Abdullah (GTA–PEJUANG)	1,180	5.33%	22,143	Sim Chon Siang (PH–PKR)
N15	Tanjung Lumpur	38,185	Rosli Abdul Jabar (PN–PAS)	16,699	54.98%	8,989	Nara @ Nikman Nordin (BN–UMNO)	7,710	25.39%	30,372	Rosli Abdul Jabar (PN–PAS)
N15	Tanjung Lumpur	38,185	Rosli Abdul Jabar (PN–PAS)	16,699	54.98%	8,989	Sabrina Md Yusuff (PH–AMANAH)	5,796	19.08%	30,372	Rosli Abdul Jabar (PN–PAS)
N15	Tanjung Lumpur	38,185	Rosli Abdul Jabar (PN–PAS)	16,699	54.98%	8,989	Ab'alim Ruslam Ahmad (GTA–PEJUANG)	167	0.55%	30,372	Rosli Abdul Jabar (PN–PAS)
N16	Inderapura	18,558	Shafik Fauzan Sharif (BN–UMNO)	7,029	46.15%	922	Mohd Hafizal Mohamed Shah (PN–PAS)	6,107	40.10%	15,230	Shafik Fauzan Sharif (BN–UMNO)
N16	Inderapura	18,558	Shafik Fauzan Sharif (BN–UMNO)	7,029	46.15%	922	Fakhrul Anuar Zulkawi (PH–PKR)	2,030	13.33%	15,230	Shafik Fauzan Sharif (BN–UMNO)
N16	Inderapura	18,558	Shafik Fauzan Sharif (BN–UMNO)	7,029	46.15%	922	Norashikin Ismail (GTA–PEJUANG)	64	0.42%	15,230	Shafik Fauzan Sharif (BN–UMNO)
N17	Sungai Lembing	19,130	Mohamad Ayub Asri (PN–PAS)	6,962	47.37%	1,054	Umor Arbain Dollah (BN–UMNO)	5,908	40.21%	14,694	Md Sohaimi Mohamed Shah (BN–UMNO)
N17	Sungai Lembing	19,130	Mohamad Ayub Asri (PN–PAS)	6,962	47.37%	1,054	Ahmad Omar (PH–PKR)	1,738	11.83%	14,694	Md Sohaimi Mohamed Shah (BN–UMNO)
N17	Sungai Lembing	19,130	Mohamad Ayub Asri (PN–PAS)	6,962	47.37%	1,054	Anuar Tajuddin (GTA–PEJUANG)	86	0.59%	14,694	Md Sohaimi Mohamed Shah (BN–UMNO)
N18	Lepar	25,728	Mohd Yazid Mohd Yunus (PN–BERSATU)	8,436	42.78%	419	Abdul Rahim Muda (BN–UMNO)	8,017	40.65%	19,722	Abdul Rahim Muda (BN–UMNO)
N18	Lepar	25,728	Mohd Yazid Mohd Yunus (PN–BERSATU)	8,436	42.78%	419	Muhammad Ibrohim Mazalan (PH–AMANAH)	3,166	16.05%	19,722	Abdul Rahim Muda (BN–UMNO)
N18	Lepar	25,728	Mohd Yazid Mohd Yunus (PN–BERSATU)	8,436	42.78%	419	Rosminahar Mohd Amin (GTA–PEJUANG)	103	0.52%	19,722	Abdul Rahim Muda (BN–UMNO)
N19	Panching	34,886	Mohd Tarmizi Yahaya (PN–PAS)	15,167	55.01%	7,136	Fauziah Abdul Wahab (BN–UMNO)	8,031	29.13%	27,571	Mohd Tarmizi Yahaya (PN–PAS)
N19	Panching	34,886	Mohd Tarmizi Yahaya (PN–PAS)	15,167	55.01%	7,136	Haslindalina Hashim (PH–PKR)	4,243	15.39%	27,571	Mohd Tarmizi Yahaya (PN–PAS)
N19	Panching	34,886	Mohd Tarmizi Yahaya (PN–PAS)	15,167	55.01%	7,136	Afif Syairol Abdul Rahim (GTA–PEJUANG)	130	0.47%	27,571	Mohd Tarmizi Yahaya (PN–PAS)
N20	Pulau Manis	30,113	Mohammad Rafiq Khan Ahmad Khan (PN–PAS)	13,064	54.21%	3,931	Khairuddin Mahmud (BN–UMNO)	9,133	37.90%	24,098	Khairuddin Mahmud (BN–UMNO)
N20	Pulau Manis	30,113	Mohammad Rafiq Khan Ahmad Khan (PN–PAS)	13,064	54.21%	3,931	Muhammad Khairi Khalid (PH–DAP)	1,901	7.89%	24,098	Khairuddin Mahmud (BN–UMNO)
N21	Peramu Jaya	41,915	Mohd Nizar Mohd Najib (BN–UMNO)	19,337	57.63%	7,823	Abu Talib Muhammad (PN–BERSATU)	11,514	34.31%	33,555	Sh Mohamed Puzi Sh Ali (BN–UMNO)
N21	Peramu Jaya	41,915	Mohd Nizar Mohd Najib (BN–UMNO)	19,337	57.63%	7,823	Tugimon Abdul Hamid (PH–AMANAH)	2,511	7.48%	33,555	Sh Mohamed Puzi Sh Ali (BN–UMNO)
N21	Peramu Jaya	41,915	Mohd Nizar Mohd Najib (BN–UMNO)	19,337	57.63%	7,823	Tengku Zainul Hisham Tengku Hussin (IND)	193	0.58%	33,555	Sh Mohamed Puzi Sh Ali (BN–UMNO)
N22	Bebar	21,294	Mohd. Fakhruddin Mohd. Arif (BN–UMNO)	10,485	67.38%	6,273	Narzatul Haidar Sakim (PN–BERSATU)	4,212	27.06%	15,563	Mohd. Fakhruddin Mohd. Arif (BN–UMNO)
N22	Bebar	21,294	Mohd. Fakhruddin Mohd. Arif (BN–UMNO)	10,485	67.38%	6,273	Ibrahim Sulaiman (PH–AMANAH)	866	5.56%	15,563	Mohd. Fakhruddin Mohd. Arif (BN–UMNO)
N23	Chini	26,121	Mohd Sharim Md Zain (BN–UMNO)	10,588	53.25%	2,125	Fakhrur Rozi Jalaluddin (PN–PAS)	8,463	42.56%	19,884	Mohd Sharim Md Zain (BN–UMNO)
N23	Chini	26,121	Mohd Sharim Md Zain (BN–UMNO)	10,588	53.25%	2,125	Mohamad Yazid Che Mat (PH–PKR)	833	4.19%	19,884	Mohd Sharim Md Zain (BN–UMNO)
N24	Luit	16,279	Mohd Sofian Abd Jalil (PN–PAS)	6,002	48.32%	1,166	Jamaluddin Md Marzuki (BN–UMNO)	4,836	38.93%	12,422	Mohd Sofian Abd Jalil (PN–PAS)
N24	Luit	16,279	Mohd Sofian Abd Jalil (PN–PAS)	6,002	48.32%	1,166	Mohd Afandi Abd Rani (PH–PKR)	1,584	12.75%	12,422	Mohd Sofian Abd Jalil (PN–PAS)
N25	Kuala Sentul	17,434	Jasri Jamaludin (PN–BERSATU)	6,016	46.22%	241	Mohd Khairuddin Mohd Ali Hanafiah (BN–UMNO)	5,775	44.38%	13,014	Shahaniza Shamsuddin (BN–UMNO)
N25	Kuala Sentul	17,434	Jasri Jamaludin (PN–BERSATU)	6,016	46.22%	241	Amran Tahir (PH–PKR)	1,223	9.40%	13,014	Shahaniza Shamsuddin (BN–UMNO)
N26	Chenor	19,415	Mujjibur Rahman Ishak (PN–PAS)	8,855	56.62%	2,706	Saiful Anuar Mokhtar (BN–UMNO)	6,149	39.31%	15,641	Mujjibur Rahman Ishak (PN–PAS)
N26	Chenor	19,415	Mujjibur Rahman Ishak (PN–PAS)	8,855	56.62%	2,706	Nor Hisham Mohd Suki (PH–AMANAH)	637	4.07%	15,641	Mujjibur Rahman Ishak (PN–PAS)
N27	Jenderak	13,994	Rodzuan Zaaba (BN–UMNO)	5,409	50.04%	1,454	Md Anuar Daud (PN–PAS)	3,955	36.58%	10,811	Mohamed Jaafar (BN–UMNO)
N27	Jenderak	13,994	Rodzuan Zaaba (BN–UMNO)	5,409	50.04%	1,454	Mohamad Hafez Harun (PH–PKR)	1,447	13.38%	10,811	Mohamed Jaafar (BN–UMNO)
N28	Kerdau	15,184	Syed Ibrahim Syed Ahmad (BN–UMNO)	6,531	53.88%	1,929	Mohd Arhan Mohd Saludin (PN–BERSATU)	4,602	37.97%	12,121	Syed Ibrahim Syed Ahmad (BN–UMNO)
N28	Kerdau	15,184	Syed Ibrahim Syed Ahmad (BN–UMNO)	6,531	53.88%	1,929	Ahmad Ariff Md Daud (PH–AMANAH)	988	8.15%	12,121	Syed Ibrahim Syed Ahmad (BN–UMNO)
N29	Jengka	31,359	Shahril Azman Abd Halim (PN–PAS)	15,309	61.66%	6,904	Nor Hashimi Abdul Ghani (BN–UMNO)	8,405	33.86%	24,825	Shahril Azman Abd Halim (PN–PAS)
N29	Jengka	31,359	Shahril Azman Abd Halim (PN–PAS)	15,309	61.66%	6,904	Jamaluddin Abd Rahim (PH–AMANAH)	1,111	4.48%	24,825	Shahril Azman Abd Halim (PN–PAS)
N30	Mentakab	37,269	Woo Chee Wan (PH–DAP)	12,905	45.38%	3,657	Mohd Yusoff Abdullah (PN–BERSATU)	9,248	32.52%	28,436	Woo Chee Wan (PH–DAP)
N30	Mentakab	37,269	Woo Chee Wan (PH–DAP)	12,905	45.38%	3,657	Wong Tze Shiang (BN–MCA)	5,996	21.09%	28,436	Woo Chee Wan (PH–DAP)
N30	Mentakab	37,269	Woo Chee Wan (PH–DAP)	12,905	45.38%	3,657	Abdul Wahab Kadir (GTA–PUTRA)	287	1.01%	28,436	Woo Chee Wan (PH–DAP)
N31	Lanchang	32,774	Hassan Omar (PN–PAS)	10,024	40.16%	451	Radzmi Sudin (BN–UMNO)	9,573	38.34%	24,968	Mohd Sharkar Shamsudin (BN–UMNO)
N31	Lanchang	32,774	Hassan Omar (PN–PAS)	10,024	40.16%	451	Rosli Ismail @ Ahmad (PH–PKR)	4,840	19.38%	24,968	Mohd Sharkar Shamsudin (BN–UMNO)
N31	Lanchang	32,774	Hassan Omar (PN–PAS)	10,024	40.16%	451	Zaini Mohamad (GTA–PEJUANG)	328	1.31%	24,968	Mohd Sharkar Shamsudin (BN–UMNO)
N31	Lanchang	32,774	Hassan Omar (PN–PAS)	10,024	40.16%	451	Jamil Yaakub (PRM)	203	0.81%	24,968	Mohd Sharkar Shamsudin (BN–UMNO)
N32	Kuala Semantan	36,786	Hassanuddin Salim (PN–PAS)	12,386	42.46%	1,738	Nor Azmi Mat Ludin (BN–UMNO)	10,648	36.49%	29,177	Nor Azmi Mat Ludin (BN–UMNO)
N32	Kuala Semantan	36,786	Hassanuddin Salim (PN–PAS)	12,386	42.46%	1,738	Azizul Shah Mohd Noor (PH–AMANAH)	5,918	20.28%	29,177	Nor Azmi Mat Ludin (BN–UMNO)
N32	Kuala Semantan	36,786	Hassanuddin Salim (PN–PAS)	12,386	42.46%	1,738	Mohd Syafiq Mohd Khaidir (GTA–PEJUANG)	225	0.77%	29,177	Nor Azmi Mat Ludin (BN–UMNO)
N33	Bilut	24,286	Lee Chin Chen (PH–DAP)	8,895	48.15%	3,111	Wong Siew Mun (BN–MCA)	5,784	31.31%	18,475	Lee Chin Chen (PH–DAP)
N33	Bilut	24,286	Lee Chin Chen (PH–DAP)	8,895	48.15%	3,111	Chandra Balabedha (PN–GERAKAN)	3,363	18.20%	18,475	Lee Chin Chen (PH–DAP)
N33	Bilut	24,286	Lee Chin Chen (PH–DAP)	8,895	48.15%	3,111	Mohd Shokri Mahmood (GTA–PUTRA)	433	2.34%	18,475	Lee Chin Chen (PH–DAP)
N34	Ketari	30,758	Thomas Su Keong Siong (PH–DAP)	9,722	41.17%	120	Amizar Abu Adam (BN–UMNO)	9,602	40.66%	23,614	Young Syefura Othman (PH–DAP)
N34	Ketari	30,758	Thomas Su Keong Siong (PH–DAP)	9,722	41.17%	120	Tan Wei Liong (PN–GERAKAN)	4,290	18.17%	23,614	Young Syefura Othman (PH–DAP)
N35	Sabai	15,643	V. Arumugam (BN–MIC)	4,444	37.52%	96	Kamache Doray Rajoo (PH–DAP)	4,348	36.71%	11,845	Kamache Doray Rajoo (PH–DAP)
N35	Sabai	15,643	V. Arumugam (BN–MIC)	4,444	37.52%	96	Nurul Qomar Abdol Talib @ Ramali (PN–BERSATU)	3,053	25.77%	11,845	Kamache Doray Rajoo (PH–DAP)
N36	Pelangai	16,371	Johari Harun (BN–UMNO)	7,308	57.71%	4,048	Kasim Samat (PN–PAS)	3,260	25.74%	12,664	Adnan Yaakob (BN–UMNO)
N36	Pelangai	16,371	Johari Harun (BN–UMNO)	7,308	57.71%	4,048	Ahmed Wafiuddin Shamsuri (PH–AMANAH)	2,031	16.04%	12,664	Adnan Yaakob (BN–UMNO)
N36	Pelangai	16,371	Johari Harun (BN–UMNO)	7,308	57.71%	4,048	Isa Ahmad (GTA–PUTRA)	65	0.51%	12,664	Adnan Yaakob (BN–UMNO)
N37	Guai	24,412	Sabariah Saidin (BN–UMNO)	9,425	49.46%	2,678	Nor Hashimah Mat Noh (PN–BERSATU)	6,747	35.41%	19,055	Norol Azali Sulaiman (BN–UMNO)
N37	Guai	24,412	Sabariah Saidin (BN–UMNO)	9,425	49.46%	2,678	Noraini Abdul Ghani (PH–AMANAH)	1,906	10.00%	19,055	Norol Azali Sulaiman (BN–UMNO)
N37	Guai	24,412	Sabariah Saidin (BN–UMNO)	9,425	49.46%	2,678	Jafari Mohd Yusof (IND)	977	5.13%	19,055	Norol Azali Sulaiman (BN–UMNO)
N38	Triang	25,891	Leong Yu Man (PH–DAP)	10,816	57.02%	6,219	Yee Cheeng Hwa (BN–MCA)	4,597	24.23%	18,970	Leong Yu Man (PH–DAP)
N38	Triang	25,891	Leong Yu Man (PH–DAP)	10,816	57.02%	6,219	Muhammad Izzudin Zulkifli (PN–BERSATU)	3,557	18.75%	18,970	Leong Yu Man (PH–DAP)
N39	Kemayan	27,366	Khairulnizam Mohamad Zuldin (BN–UMNO)	13,778	66.74%	6,913	Shapuan Hussin (PN–PAS)	6,865	33.26%	20,643	Mohd Fadil Osman (BN–UMNO)
N40	Bukit Ibam	31,003	Nazri Ahmad (PN–PAS)	12,488	52.88%	2,456	Samsiah Arshad (BN–UMNO)	10,032	42.48%	23,616	Samsiah Arshad (BN–UMNO)
N40	Bukit Ibam	31,003	Nazri Ahmad (PN–PAS)	12,488	52.88%	2,456	Bariral Mohd Mokhtar (PH–PKR)	1,096	4.64%	23,616	Samsiah Arshad (BN–UMNO)
N41	Muadzam Shah	29,663	Razali Kassim (BN–UMNO)	10,990	49.35%	1,234	Jaafar Mustaffa (PN–BERSATU)	9,756	43.81%	22,269	Razali Kassim (BN–UMNO)
N41	Muadzam Shah	29,663	Razali Kassim (BN–UMNO)	10,990	49.35%	1,234	Norlaily Forizad (PH–PKR)	1,523	6.84%	22,269	Razali Kassim (BN–UMNO)
N42	Tioman	28,465	Mohd. Johari Husin (BN–UMNO)	8,080	48.95%	573	Nor Idayu Hashim (PN–PAS)	7,507	45.47%	16,508	Mohd. Johari Husin (BN–UMNO)
N42	Tioman	28,465	Mohd. Johari Husin (BN–UMNO)	8,080	48.95%	573	Mohd Fadzli Mohd Ramly (PH–AMANAH)	784	4.75%	16,508	Mohd. Johari Husin (BN–UMNO)
N42	Tioman	28,465	Mohd. Johari Husin (BN–UMNO)	8,080	48.95%	573	Osman Bakar (GTA–PEJUANG)	79	0.48%	16,508	Mohd. Johari Husin (BN–UMNO)
N42	Tioman	28,465	Mohd. Johari Husin (BN–UMNO)	8,080	48.95%	573	Sulaiman Bakar (IND)	58	0.35%	16,508	Mohd. Johari Husin (BN–UMNO)
