= Perlis State Executive Council =

State government of Perlis, Malaysia

- 2025–present
- Date formed: 28 December 2025

People and organisations
- Raja: Sirajuddin
- Menteri Besar: Abu Bakar Hamzah (IPR–BERSATU)
- Total no. of members: 5
- Member parties: Ikatan Prihatin Rakyat: Malaysian United Indigenous Party (BERSATU)
- Status in legislature: Coalition government 10 / 15
- Opposition parties: Pakatan Harapan (PH); People's Justice Party (PKR)
- Opposition leader: Gan Ay Ling (PH–PKR)

History
- Election: 2022 Perlis state election
- Legislature term: 15th

The Perlis State Executive Council is the executive authority of the Government of Perlis, Malaysia. It is composed of the Menteri Besar, who is appointed by the Raja on the basis that he commands the confidence of the majority in the Perlis State Legislative Assembly, along with several Members of the Assembly, the State Secretary, the State Legal Adviser and the State Financial Officer.

In both structure and function, the Council is comparable to the Cabinet of Malaysia, albeit on a smaller scale. As the division of responsibilities differs between the federal and state levels, certain portfolios held by the Council differ from those at the federal level. Due to the relatively small size of the Assembly, the Council is smaller than those in other states, comprising only 5 members, compared to the 11 members typically found in other state executive councils.

Members of the Council are selected by the Menteri Besar and formally appointed by the Raja. Unlike the federal government, the Council does not operate through ministries. Instead, it functions through a system of committees, each responsible for overseeing specific portfolios. Members of the Council customarily serve as the chairpersons of their respective committees.

== Lists of full members ==
=== Abu Bakar EXCO (since 2025) ===
IPR (5)
- BERSATU (5)

Members since 28 December 2025 has been :

Name	Portfolio	Party	Constituency	Term start	Term end
Abu Bakar Hamzah (Menteri Besar)	Administration and Finance; Economic Planning and Industrial Development; Land and Natural Resources; Tourism, Arts and Culture; Facilities and Infrastructure; Security and Border Relations	BERSATU	Kuala Perlis	28 December 2025	Incumbent
Izizam Ibrahim	Islamic Religion Affairs; Housing and Local Government; Domestic Trade, Cooperatives and Consumerism; Human Resource Development	BERSATU	Titi Tinggi	8 January 2026	Incumbent
Marzita Mansor	Women, Family and Community Development; Education; Social Unity; Welfare and Poverty Eradication	BERSATU	Sena	8 January 2026	Incumbent
Megat Hashirat Hassan	Agriculture; Health; Entrepreneur Development and Cooperatives; Environment	BERSATU	Pauh	8 January 2026	Incumbent
Wan Zikri Afthar Ishak	Youth and Sports; Information and Digital; Transport; Science, Technology and Innovation	BERSATU	Tambun Tulang	8 January 2026	Incumbent

== Former members ==
=== Mohd Shukri EXCO (2022–2025) ===
PN (9)
- PAS (6)
- BERSATU (3)

Members from 22 November 2022 to 25 December 2025 :

Name	Portfolio	Party	Constituency	Term start	Term end
Mohd Shukri Ramli (Menteri Besar)	Administration and Finance; Investment and International Trade; Economic Planning and Industrial Development; Land and Natural Resources; Security and Public Order; Development of New Growth Centre (2022–2023)	PAS	Sanglang	22 November 2022	25 December 2025
Razali Saad	Agriculture and Agro-based Industries; Plantation Industries and Commodities; Domestic Trade, Cooperatives and Consumerism (2023–2025); Rural Development (2022–2024); Poverty Eradication (2022–2023)	PAS	Simpang Empat	25 November 2022	25 December 2025
Fakhrul Anwar Ismail	Housing and Local Government; Hawker and Small Traders; Domestic Trade, Cooperatives and Consumerism; Entrepreneur Development, Small and Medium Industries	PAS	Bintong	25 November 2022	16 November 2023
Asrul Aimran Abd Jalil	Housing and Local Government; Information and Digital (2024–2025); Human Resource Development (2023–2024); Poverty Eradication (2023–2024)	PAS	Kayang	16 November 2023	25 December 2025
Wan Badariah Wan Saad	Women, Family and Community Development; Social Unity (2024–2025); Environment (2024–2025); Tourism (2023–2024); Welfare (2023–2024); Disaster Relief (2022–2023); Culture, Arts and Heritage (2023–2024)	PAS	Mata Ayer	25 November 2022	25 December 2025
Mohammad Azmir Azizan	Islamic Religion Affairs; Education; Youth and Sports (2022–2023); Human Resource Development (2022–2023; 2024–2025); Information (2023–2024); Non-Government Organisations (2023–2024); Halal Industry (2023–2024)	PAS	Santan	25 November 2022	25 December 2025
Mohd Ridzuan Hashim	Youth and Sports; Science, Technology and Innovation	PAS	Guar Sanji	25 November 2024	25 December 2025
Izizam Ibrahim	Facilities and Infrastructure; Transport; Border Relations and Cooperation; Integrated Coordination and Public Complaint (2022–2024)	BERSATU	Titi Tinggi	25 November 2022	25 December 2025
Megat Hashirat Hassan	Science, Technology and Innovation; Environment; Biotechnology and Green Technology; Social Unity; Health; Information Technology and Communication (2022–2023); Disaster Relief (2023–2024)	BERSATU	Pauh	25 November 2022	25 November 2024
Wan Zikri Afthar Ishak	Youth and Sports; Hawker and Small Traders; Entrepreneur Development, Small and Medium Industries; Development of New Growth Centre; Creative Economy	BERSATU	Tambun Tulang	16 November 2023	25 November 2024
Abu Bakar Hamzah	Tourism; Culture, Arts and Heritage; Rural Development	BERSATU	Kuala Perlis	25 November 2024	25 December 2025
Marzita Mansor	Welfare; Health; Entrepreneur Development; Small and Medium Industries	BERSATU	Sena	25 November 2024	25 December 2025

=== Azlan II EXCO (2018–2022) ===
BN (9)
- UMNO (8)
- MCA (1)

Members from 24 May 2018 to 22 November 2022 were :

Name	Portfolio	Party	Constituency	Term start	Term end
Azlan Man (Menteri Besar)	Administration and Finance; International Trade and Investment; Economic Planning and Industrial Development; Land Affairs; Security and Public Order	UMNO	Bintong	24 May 2018	22 November 2022
Asmaiza Ahmad	Rural Development and Poverty Eradication; Development of New Growth Centre; Tourism; Culture, Art and Heritage	UMNO	Chuping	13 June 2018	22 November 2022
Nurulhisham Yaakob	Agriculture and Agro-based Industry; Plantation Industries and Commodities; Unified Enforcement Coordination; Public Complaint	UMNO	Simpang Empat	13 June 2018	22 November 2022
Azizan Sulaiman	Housing and Local Government; Hawkers and Small Business; Domestic Trade, Cooperatives and Consumerism; Entrepreneurial Development and Small-Medium Industries	UMNO	Santan	13 June 2018	22 November 2022
Hamizan Hassan	Utilities and Public Facilities; Transportation; Youth and Sports; Non-governmental Organisations	UMNO	Kayang	13 June 2018	22 November 2022
Rozaini Rais	Islamic Affairs; Welfare and Disaster Assistance; Relations and Boundary Cooperation	UMNO	Beseri	13 June 2018	22 November 2022
Rozieana Ahmad	Education; Human Resources; Science, Technology and Innovation; Information and Communication Technology	UMNO	Pauh	13 June 2018	22 November 2022
Siti Berenee Yahaya	Women, Family and Community Development; Community Unity; Special Tasks	UMNO	Mata Ayer	13 June 2018	22 November 2022
Teh Chai Aan	Natural Resources and Environment; Biotechnology and Green Technology; Health	MCA	Titi Tinggi	13 June 2018	22 November 2022

=== Azlan I EXCO (2013–2018) ===
BN (11)
- UMNO (11)

Members from 15 May 2013 to 24 May 2018 were :

Name	Portfolio	Party	Constituency	Term start	Term end
Azlan Man (Menteri Besar)	Administration and Finance; International Investment and Trade; Land Affairs; Lower and Higher Education; Public Safety and Order; International Cooperation and Boundary Cooperation; Information	UMNO	Pauh	15 May 2013	24 May 2018
Sabry Ahmad	Domestic Trade, Cooperative and Consumerism; Transport; Development of Region, Corridor, New Growth Areas and New Town	UMNO	Santan	15 May 2013	12 May 2017
Asmaiza Ahmad	Domestic Trade, Cooperative and Consumerism; Transport; Development of Region, Corridor, New Growth Areas and New Town	UMNO	Chuping	12 May 2017	24 May 2018
Ahmad Bakri Ali	Agriculture and Agro-based Industry; Plantation Industries and Commodities; Biotechnology and Green Technology; Entrepreneurial Development and Small Medium Industries	UMNO	Kayang	15 May 2013	24 May 2018
Abdul Jamil Saad	Youth and Sports; Tourism; Culture, Art and Heritage	UMNO	Sena	15 May 2013	24 May 2018
Mat Rawi Kassim	Natural Resources and Environment; Science, Technology and Innovation; Information and Communications Technology (ICT) Development; Corporate Communication; Public Complaints; Governance; Special Duties	UMNO	Beseri	15 May 2013	24 May 2018
Jafperi Osman	Public Facilities and Utilities; Rural Development and Poverty Eradication; Health	UMNO	Guar Sanji	15 May 2013	12 May 2017
Nurulhisham Yaakob	Public Facilities and Utilities; Rural Development and Poverty Eradication; Health	UMNO	Simpang Empat	12 May 2017	24 May 2018
Khairi Hasan	Islamic Affairs; Human Resources Development	UMNO	Mata Ayer	15 May 2013	24 May 2018
Mat Hassan	Housing; Local Government; Municipal Services; Hawkers and Small Business Development	UMNO	Kuala Perlis	15 May 2013	24 May 2018
Rela Ahmad	Women, Family and Community Development; Community Care; Community Unity	UMNO	Bintong	15 May 2013	24 May 2018

=== Md Isa EXCO (2008–2013) ===
BN (12)
- UMNO (11)
- MCA (1)

Members from 2008 to 2013 were :

Name	Portfolio	Party	Constituency	Term start	Term end
Md Isa Sabu (Menteri Besar)		UMNO	Bintong	2008	2013
Syed Razlan Putra Jamalullail	Investment; Trade; Industry; International Relations (2011–2013)	UMNO	Pauh	2008	2013
Sabri Ahmad	Agriculture; Agro-Based Industry; Cooperative Development (2011–2013)	UMNO	Santan	2008	2013
Ahmad Bakri Ali	Tourism; Health; Rural Development (2011–2013)	UMNO	Kayang	2008	2013
Abdul Jamil Saad	Youth; Sports; Culture; Arts (2008–2011); Human Resources (2008–2011); Unity (2008–2011)	UMNO	Sena	2008	2013
Mat Rawi Kassim	Land; Forestry; Environment; Enforcement; Consumerism (2011–2013)	UMNO	Beseri	2008	2013
Jafperi Othman	Islam Religion; Hadhari Development (2008–2011); Hadhari (2011–2013); Sunnah Development (2011–2013)	UMNO	Guar Sanji	2008	2013
Mansor Jusoh	Women's Affairs; Welfare; Consumer Affairs	UMNO	Chuping	2011	2013
Yip Sun Onn	Housing; Local Government; New Towns	MCA	Titi Tinggi	2008	2011
Por Choo Chor	Housing; Local Government	MCA	Indera Kayangan	2011	2013

=== Shahidan Kassim III EXCO (2004–2008) ===
BN (11)
- UMNO (10)
- MCA (1)

Members from 2004 to 2008 were :

Name	Portfolio	Party	Constituency	Term start	Term end
Shahidan Kassim (Menteri Besar)					

=== Shahidan Kassim II EXCO (1999–2004) ===
==== Members ====
BN (11)
- UMNO (10)
- MCA (1)

Members from 1999 to 2004 were :

Name	Portfolio	Party	Constituency	Term start	Term end
Shahidan Kassim (Menteri Besar)	Youth and Sports; Education; Administration; Finance; Unity	UMNO	Tambun Tulang	1999	2004
Ishak Arshad	Islam Religion; Agriculture; Consumerism	UMNO	Mata Ayer	1999	2004
Yazid Mat	Investment; Industry	UMNO	Chuping	1999	2004
Khor Liang Tee	Local Government	MCA	Indera Kayangan	1999	2004
Md Isa Sabu	Tourism; Environment	UMNO	Bintong	1999	2004
Mohd Hadzi Nordin	Land	UMNO	Kayang	1999	2004

==== Deputy members ====
BN (11)
- UMNO (10)
- MCA (1)

Deputy members from 1999 to 2004 were :

Name	Portfolio	Party	Constituency	Term start	Term end
Zahari Zainul Abidin	Youth and Sports; Education; Administration; Finance; Unity	UMNO	Beseri	1999	2004
Sulaiman Ismail (Acting State Director of Education)	Youth and Sports; Education; Administration; Finance; Unity	Not suitable		1999	2004
Abdul Latif Omar (State Secretary)	Youth and Sports; Education; Administration; Finance; Unity	Not suitable		1999	2004
Abu Bakar Ismail	Islam Religion; Agriculture; Consumerism	UMNO	Pauh	1999	2004
Abu Bakar Saad	Investment; Industry	UMNO	Kuala Perlis	1999	2004
Zahari Bakar	Local Government	UMNO	Simpang Empat	1999	2004
Loh Yoon Foo	Tourism; Environment	MCA	Titi Tinggi	1999	2004
Azihani Ali	Land	UMNO	Sena	1999	2004

== Ex officio members ==
Position	Office bearer
State Secretary	Noor Azman Abdul Rahman
State Legal Advisor	Yang Zaimey Yang Ghazali
State Financial Officer	Shaharuddin Sarwan

== See also ==
- Raja of Perlis
- Menteri Besar of Perlis
- Perlis State Legislative Assembly
