= Razali Saad =

Razali Saad may refer to:

- Razali Saad (politician) (born 1965), Malaysian politician
- Razali Saad (footballer) (born 1964), Singaporean footballer
