= Rus'sele Eizan =

Malaysian politician

Yang Berhormat Tuan Rus'sele Eizan SMP

Speaker of the Perlis State Legislative Assembly
- Incumbent
- Assumed office 19 December 2022
- Preceded by: Hamdan Bahari (BN–UMNO)
- Constituency: Non-MLA

Member of the Perlis State Legislative Assembly for Simpang Empat
- In office 8 March 2008 – 5 May 2013
- Preceded by: Zahari Bakar (BN–UMNO)
- Succeeded by: Nurulhisham Yaakob (BN–UMNO)
- Majority: 53 (2008)

Personal details
- Born: 9 January 1957 (age 69) Simpang Empat, Perlis, Federation of Malaya
- Party: Malaysian Islamic Party (PAS)
- Other political affiliations: Pakatan Rakyat (PR) (2008–2015); Gagasan Sejahtera (GS) (2016–2020); Perikatan Nasional (PN) (since 2020)
- Occupation: Politician

Rus'sele bin Eizan (born 9 January 1957) is a Malaysian politician who served as Speaker of the Perlis State Legislative Assembly since December 2022 and Member of the Perlis State Legislative Assembly (MLA) for Simpang Empat from March 2008 to May 2013. He is a Malaysian Islamic Party (PAS), a component party of Perikatan Nasional (PN) coalitions, formerly Pakatan Rakyat (PR) and Gagasan Sejahtera (GS) coalitions.

== Political career ==
Rus'sele Eizan sworn in as Speaker of the Perlis State Legislative Assembly on 19 December 2022.

== Election results ==
Perlis State Legislative Assembly
Year	Constituency	Candidate	Votes	Pct	Opponent(s)	Votes	Pct	Ballots cast	Majority	Turnout
2008	N14 Simpang Empat	Rus'sele Eizan (PAS)	2,878	50.46%	Zahari Bakar (UMNO)	2,825	49.54%	5,793	53	82.98%
2013	N14 Simpang Empat	Rus'sele Eizan (PAS)	3,277	49.36%	Nurulhisham Yaakob (UMNO)	3,362	50.64%	6,729	85	86.56%
2018	N14 Simpang Empat	Rus'sele Eizan (PAS)	2,446	35.28%	Nurulhisham Yaakob (UMNO)	2,528	36.46%	7,704	82	90.14%
2018	N14 Simpang Empat	Rus'sele Eizan (PAS)	2,446	35.28%	Wan Noralhakim Shaghir Saad (PKR)	1,960	28.26%	7,704	82	90.14%

== Honours ==
- Perlis
  - Companion of the Order of the Crown of Perlis (SMP) (2025)
  - Recipient of Tuanku Syed Sirajuddin Jamalullail Silver Jubilee Medal (2025)
