= Rozieana Ahmad =

Malaysian politician

- رضينة بنت أحمد

Member of the Perlis State Executive Council (Education, Human Resources Development, Science, Technology, Innovation, Information Technology and Communications)
- In office 13 June 2018 – 22 November 2022
- Monarch: Sirajuddin
- Menteri Besar: Azlan Man
- Preceded by: Azlan Man (Menteri Besar, Education, Science, Technology, Innovation, Information Technology and Communications); Khairi Hasan (Human Resources Development)
- Succeeded by: Mohammad Azmir Azizan (Education, Human Resources Development); Megat Hashirat Hassan (Science, Technology, Innovation, Information Technology and Communications)
- Constituency: Pauh

Member of the Perlis State Legislative Assembly for Pauh
- In office 9 May 2018 – 19 November 2022
- Preceded by: Azlan Man (BN–UMNO)
- Succeeded by: Megat Hashirat Hassan (PN–BERSATU)
- Majority: 143 (2018)

Personal details
- Born: Perlis, Malaysia
- Citizenship: Malaysian
- Party: United Malays National Organisation (UMNO)
- Other political affiliations: Barisan Nasional (BN)
- Occupation: Politician

Rozieana binti Ahmad is a Malaysian politician who served as Member of the Perlis State Executive Council (EXCO) in the Barisan Nasional (BN) state administration under former Menteri Besar Azlan Man from June 2018 to the collapse of the BN state administration in November 2022 as well as Member of the Perlis State Legislative Assembly (MLA) for Pauh from May 2018 to November 2022. She is a member of the United Malays National Organisation (UMNO), a component party of the BN coalition.

== Political career ==
=== Member of the Perlis State Executive Council (2018–2022) ===
On 13 June 2018, Rozieana was appointed as the Perlis State EXCO Member in charge of Education, Human Resources Development, Science, Technology, Innovation, Information Technology and Communications by Menteri Besar Azlan.

On 22 November 2022, Rozeiana lost her position after the BN state administration collapsed following the huge defeat of BN in the 2022 Perlis state election that wiped BN out of the assembly.

=== Member of the Perlis State Legislative Assembly (2018–2022) ===
==== 2018 Perlis state election ====
In the 2018 Perlis state election, Rozieana made her electoral debut after being nominated by BN to contest for the Pauh state seat. She won the seat and was elected into the Perlis State Legislative Assembly as the Pauh MLA after narrowly defeating Ameir Hassan of Pakatan Harapan (PH) and Idris Yaacob of Gagasan Sejahtera (GS) by a majority of only 143 votes.

==== 2022 Perlis state election ====
In the 2022 Perlis state election, Rozeiana was renominated by BN to contest for the Guar Sanji state seat instead of defending the Pauh seat. She was not elected as the Guar Sanji MLA after losing to Mohd Ridzuan Hashim of Perikatan Nasional (PN) by a minority of 5,101 votes.

== Election results ==
Perlis State Legislative Assembly
| Year | Constituency | Candidate | Votes | Pct | Opponent(s) | Votes | Pct | Ballots cast | Majority | Turnout |
|---|---|---|---|---|---|---|---|---|---|---|
| 2018 | N11 Pauh | Rozieana Ahmad (UMNO) | 3,564 | 39.29% | Ameir Hassan (BERSATU) | 3,421 | 37.72% | 9,310 | 143 | 83.13% |
| 2018 | N11 Pauh | Rozieana Ahmad (UMNO) | 3,564 | 39.29% | Idris Yaacob (PAS) | 2,085 | 21.57% | 9,310 | 143 | 83.13% |
| 2022 | N13 Guar Sanji | Rozieana Ahmad (UMNO) | 1,616 | 17.85% | Mohd Ridzuan Hashim (PAS) | 6,717 | 74.20% | 9,053 | 5,101 | 78.65% |
| 2022 | N13 Guar Sanji | Rozieana Ahmad (UMNO) | 1,616 | 17.85% | Hasparizal Hassan (PKR) | 601 | 6.64% | 9,053 | 5,101 | 78.65% |
| 2022 | N13 Guar Sanji | Rozieana Ahmad (UMNO) | 1,616 | 17.85% | Abdul Malik Abdullah (PEJUANG) | 119 | 1.31% | 9,053 | 5,101 | 78.65% |
