= Nurulhisham Yaakob =

Malaysian politician

- نور الهشام بن يعقوب

Member of the Perlis State Executive Council
- In office 13 June 2018 – 22 November 2022 (Agriculture, Agro-based Industry, Plantation Industries, Commodities, Integrated Enforcement Coordination and Public Complaints)
- Monarch: Sirajuddin
- Menteri Besar: Azlan Man
- Preceded by: Ahmad Bakri Ali (Agriculture, Agro-based Industry, Plantation Industries and Commodities); Mat Rawi Kassim (Public Complaints); Portfolio established (Integrated Enforcement Coordination)
- Succeeded by: Razali Saad (Agriculture, Agro-based Industry, Plantation Industries and Commodities); Izizam Ibrahim (Integrated Enforcement Coordination and Public Complaints)
- Constituency: Simpang Empat
- In office 12 May 2017 – 24 May 2018 (Public Facilities, Infrastructure, Rural Development, Poverty Eradication and Health)
- Monarch: Sirajuddin
- Menteri Besar: Azlan Man
- Preceded by: Jafperi Othman
- Succeeded by: Hamizan Hassan (Public Facilities and Infrastructure); Asmaiza Ahmad (Rural Development and Poverty Eradication); Teh Chai Aan (Health)
- Constituency: Simpang Empat

Member of the Perlis State Legislative Assembly for Simpang Empat
- In office 5 May 2013 – 19 November 2022
- Preceded by: Rus'sele Eizan (PR–PAS)
- Succeeded by: Razali Saad (PN–PAS)
- Majority: 85 (2013); 82 (2018)

Faction represented in Perlis State Legislative Assembly
- 2013–2022: Barisan Nasional

Personal details
- Born: Nurulhisham bin Yaakob Perlis, Malaysia
- Citizenship: Malaysian
- Party: United Malays National Organisation (UMNO)
- Other political affiliations: Barisan Nasional (BN)
- Occupation: Politician

Nurulhisham bin Yaakob is a Malaysian politician who served as Member of the Perlis State Executive Council (EXCO) in the Barisan Nasional (BN) state administration under former Menteri Besar Azlan Man from May 2017 to May 2018 for the first term and from June 2018 to the collapse of the BN state administration in November 2022 for the second term, as well as Member of the Perlis State Legislative Assembly (MLA) for Simpang Empat from May 2013 to November 2022. He is a member of the United Malays National Organisation (UMNO), a component party of the BN coalition.

== Political career ==
=== Member of the Perlis State Executive Council (2017–2022) ===
On 12 May 2017, Nurulhisham was appointed as the Perlis State EXCO Member for the first term in charge of Public Facilities, Infrastructure, Rural Development, Poverty Eradication and Health by Menteri Besar Azlan to replace Jafperi Othman.

On 13 June 2018, Nurulhisham was reappointed as the Perlis State EXCO Member for the second term in charge of Agriculture, Agro-based Industry, Plantation Industries, Commodities, Integrated Enforcement Coordination and Public Complaints by Menteri Besar Azlan.

On 22 November 2022, Nurulhisham lost his position after the BN state administration collapsed following the huge defeat of BN in the 2022 Perlis state election that wiped BN out of the assembly.

=== Member of the Perlis State Legislative Assembly (2013–2022) ===
==== 2013 Perlis state election ====
In the 2013 Perlis state election, Nurulhisham made his electoral debut after being nominated by BN to contest for the Simpang Empat state seat. He won the seat and was elected into the Perlis State Legislative Assembly as the Simpang Empat MLA for the first term after narrowly defeating Rus'sele Eizan of Pakatan Rakyat (PR) by a majority of only 85 votes.

==== 2018 Perlis state election ====
In the 2018 Perlis state election, Nurulhisham was renominated by BN to defend the Simpang Empat seat. He defended the seat and was reelected as the Simpang Empat MLA for the second term after again narrowly defeating Rus'sele of Gagasan Sejahtera (GS) and Wan Noralhakim Shaghir Saad of Pakatan Harapan (PH) by a majority of only 82 votes.

==== 2022 Perlis state election ====
In the 2022 Perlis state election, Nurulhisham was renominated by BN to defend the Simpang Empat seat. He lost the seat and was not reelected as the Simpang Empat MLA after losing to Razali Saad of Perikatan Nasional (PN) by a majority of 4,008 votes.

== Election results ==
Perlis State Legislative Assembly
Year	Constituency		Votes	Pct	Opponent(s)	Votes	Pct	Ballots cast	Majority	Turnout
2013	N14 Simpang Empat	Nurulhisham Yaakob (UMNO)	3,362	50.64%	Rus'sele Eizan (PAS)	3,277	49.36%	6,729	85	86.56%
2018	N14 Simpang Empat	Nurulhisham Yaakob (UMNO)	2,528	36.46%	Rus'sele Eizan (PAS)	2,446	35.28%	7,704	82	90.14%
2018	N14 Simpang Empat	Nurulhisham Yaakob (UMNO)	2,528	36.46%	Wan Noralhakim Shaghir Saad (PKR)	1,960	28.26%	7,704	82	90.14%
2022	N14 Simpang Empat	Nurulhisham Yaakob (UMNO)	1,380	17.01%	Razali Saad (PAS)	5,388	66.40%	8,115	4,008	75.86%
2022	N14 Simpang Empat	Nurulhisham Yaakob (UMNO)	1,380	17.01%	Amran Darus (PKR)	1,111	13.69%	8,115	4,008	75.86%
2022	N14 Simpang Empat	Nurulhisham Yaakob (UMNO)	1,380	17.01%	Ammar Hassan (Independent)	128	1.58%	8,115	4,008	75.86%
2022	N14 Simpang Empat	Nurulhisham Yaakob (UMNO)	1,380	17.01%	Izhar Sudin (PEJUANG)	73	0.90%	8,115	4,008	75.86%
2022	N14 Simpang Empat	Nurulhisham Yaakob (UMNO)	1,380	17.01%	Hakim Saad (WARISAN)	35	0.43%	8,115	4,008	75.86%
