= Asmaiza Ahmad =

Malaysian politician

- أسماء عزة بنت أحمد

Member of the Perlis State Executive Council (Domestic Trade, Cooperatives, Consumerism, Regional, Corridor, New Growth Areas and New Townships Development : 12 May 2017–23 May 2018) (Rural Development, Poverty Eradication, Development of New Growth Centre, Tourism, Culture, Arts and Heritage : 13 June 2018–22 November 2022)
- In office 13 June 2018 – 22 November 2022
- Monarch: Sirajuddin
- Menteri Besar: Azlan Man
- Preceded by: Nurulhisham Yaakob (Rural Development and Poverty Eradication); Herself (Development of New Growth Centre); Abdul Jamil Saad (Tourism, Culture, Art and Heritage)
- Succeeded by: Razali Saad (Rural Development and Poverty Eradication); Mohd Shukri Ramli (Development of New Growth Centre); Wan Badariah Wan Saad (Tourism, Culture, Arts and Heritage)
- Constituency: Chuping
- In office 12 May 2017 – 23 May 2018
- Monarch: Sirajuddin
- Menteri Besar: Azlan Man
- Preceded by: Sabry Ahmad
- Succeeded by: Azizan Sulaiman (Domestic Trade, Cooperatives and Consumerism); Herself (Regional, Corridor, New Growth Areas and New Townships Development)
- Constituency: Chuping

Member of the Perlis State Legislative Assembly for Chuping
- In office 5 May 2013 – 19 November 2022
- Preceded by: Mansor Jusoh (BN–UMNO)
- Succeeded by: Saad Seman (PN–PAS)
- Majority: 2,876 (2013); 1,367 (2018)

Personal details
- Born: 18 April 1975 (age 51) Perlis, Malaysia
- Citizenship: Malaysian
- Party: United Malays National Organisation (UMNO)
- Other political affiliations: Barisan Nasional (BN)
- Occupation: Politician

Asmaiza binti Ahmad (born 18 April 1975) is a Malaysian politician who served as Member of the Perlis State Executive Council (EXCO) in the Barisan Nasional (BN) state administration under former Menteri Besar Azlan Man from May 2017 to May 2018 for the first term and from June 2018 to the collapse of the BN state administration in November 2022 for the second term as well as Member of the Perlis State Legislative Assembly (MLA) for Chuping from May 2013 to November 2022. She is a member of the United Malays National Organisation (UMNO), a component party of the BN coalition.

== Political career ==
=== Member of the Perlis State Executive Council (2017–2022) ===
On 12 May 2017, Asmaiza was appointed as the Perlis State EXCO Member for the first term in charge of Domestic Trade, Cooperatives, Consumerism, Transport, Development of Region, Corridor, New Growth Areas and New Town by Menteri Besar Azlan to replace Sabry Ahmad.

On 13 June 2018, Asmaiza was reappointed as the Perlis State EXCO Member for the second term in charge of Rural Development, Poverty Eradication, Development of New Growth Centre, Tourism, Culture, Arts and Heritage by Menteri Besar Azlan.

On 22 November 2022, Asmaiza lost her position after the BN state administration collapsed following the huge defeat of BN in the 2022 Perlis state election that wiped BN out of the assembly.

=== Member of the Perlis State Legislative Assembly (2013–2022) ===
==== 2013 Perlis state election ====
In the 2013 Perlis state election, Asmaiza made her electoral debut after being nominated by BN to contest for the Chuping state seat. She won the seat and was elected into the Perlis State Legislative Assembly as the Chuping MLA for the first term after narrowly defeating Wan Mohamad Fishaal Wan Daud of Pakatan Rakyat (PR) by a majority of 2,876 votes.

==== 2018 Perlis state election ====
In the 2018 Perlis state election, Asmaiza was renominated by BN to defend the Chuping seat. She defended the seat and was reelected as the Chuping MLA for the second term after defeating Poziyah Hamza of Pakatan Harapan (PH) and Mohd Ali Puteh of Gagasan Sejahtera (GS) by a majority of 1,367 votes.

==== 2022 Perlis state election ====
In the 2022 Perlis state election, Asmaiza was renominated by BN to defend the Chuping seat. She lost the seat and was not reelected as the Chuping MLA after losing to Saad Seman of Perikatan Nasional (PN) by a minority of 2,420 votes.

== Election results ==
Perlis State Legislative Assembly
Year	Constituency		Votes	Pct	Opponent(s)	Votes	Pct	Ballots cast	Majority	Turnout
2013	N03 Chuping	Asmaiza Ahmad (UMNO)	5,688	66.92%	Wan Mohamad Fishaal Wan Daud (PKR)	2,812	33.08%	8,682	2,876	88.16%
2018	N03 Chuping	Asmaiza Ahmad (UMNO)	3,889	46.42%	Poziyah Hamza (PKR)	2,522	30.10%	8,624	1,367	81.81%
2018	N03 Chuping	Asmaiza Ahmad (UMNO)	3,889	46.42%	Mohd Ali Puteh (PAS)	1,967	23.48%	8,624	1,367	81.81%
2022	N03 Chuping	Asmaiza Ahmad (UMNO)	3,453	31.60%	Saad Seman (PAS)	5,873	53.74%	8,939	2,420	73.7%
2022	N03 Chuping	Asmaiza Ahmad (UMNO)	3,453	31.60%	Natthavuth Seng (PKR)	1,602	14.66%	8,939	2,420	73.7%
