= Azizan Sulaiman =

Malaysian politician

- عزيزان بن سليمان

Member of the Perlis State Executive Council (Housing, Local Government, Small Hawkers and Businessmen, Domestic Trade, Cooperatives, Consumer Affairs, Entrepreneur Development and Small and Medium Industries)
- In office 13 June 2018 – 22 November 2022
- Monarch: Sirajuddin
- Menteri Besar: Azlan Man
- Preceded by: Mat Hassan (Housing, Local Government, Hawkers and Small Business Development); Asmaiza Ahmad (Domestic Trade, Co-operatives and Consumer Affairs); Ahamd Zakri Ali (Small and Medium Industries)
- Succeeded by: Fakhrul Anwar Ismail
- Constituency: Santan

Member of the Perlis State Legislative Assembly for Santan
- In office 9 May 2018 – 19 November 2022
- Preceded by: Sabry Ahmad (BN–UMNO)
- Succeeded by: Mohammad Azmir Azizan (PN–PAS)
- Majority: 949 (2018)

Faction represented in Perlis State Legislative Assembly
- 2018–2022: Barisan Nasional

Personal details
- Born: Perlis, Malaysia
- Citizenship: Malaysian
- Party: United Malays National Organisation (UMNO)
- Other political affiliations: Barisan Nasional (BN)
- Occupation: Politician

Azizan bin Sulaiman is a Malaysian politician who served as Member of the Perlis State Executive Council (EXCO) in the Barisan Nasional (BN) state administration under former Menteri Besar Azlan Man from June 2018 to the collapse of the BN state administration in November 2022 as well as Member of the Perlis State Legislative Assembly (MLA) for Santan from May 2018 to November 2022. He is a member and Division Deputy Chief of Padang Besar of the United Malays National Organisation (UMNO), a component party of the BN coalition.

== Political career ==
=== Member of the Perlis State Executive Council (2018–2022) ===
On 13 June 2018, Azizan was appointed as the Perlis State EXCO Member in charge of Housing, Local Government, Hawkers, Small Business Development, Domestic Trade, Co-operatives, Consumer Affairs, Entrepreneur Development and Small–Medium Industries by Menteri Besar Azlan.

On 22 November 2022, Azizan lost his position after the BN state administration collapsed following the huge defeat of BN in the 2022 Perlis state election that wiped BN out of the assembly.

=== Member of the Perlis State Legislative Assembly (2018–2022) ===
==== 2018 Perlis state election ====
In the 2018 Perlis state election, Azizan made his electoral debut after being nominated by BN to contest for the Santan state seat. He won the seat and was elected into the Perlis State Legislative Assembly as the Santan MLA after defeating Che Mazlina Che Yob of Pakatan Harapan (PH) and Baharuddin Ahmad of Gagasan Sejahtera (GS) by a majority of 949 votes.

==== 2022 Perlis state election ====
In the 2022 Perlis state election, Azizan was renominated by BN to defend the Santan seat. He lost the seat and was not reelected as the Santan MLA after losing to Mohammad Azmir Azizan of Perikatan Nasional (PN) by a minority of 2,108 votes.

== Election results ==
Perlis State Legislative Assembly
Year	Constituency		Votes	Pct	Opponent(s)	Votes	Pct	Ballots cast	Majority	Turnout
2018	N05 Santan	Azizan Sulaiman (UMNO)	3,071	40.76%	Che Mazlina Che Yob (AMANAH)	2,122	30.10%	7,393	949	82.96%
2018	N05 Santan	Azizan Sulaiman (UMNO)	3,071	40.76%	Baharuddin Ahmad (PAS)	2,088	29.14%	7,393	949	82.96%
2022	N05 Santan	Azizan Sulaiman (UMNO)	2,644	31.38%	Mohammad Azmir Azizan (PAS)	4,752	56.40%	8,426	2,108	78.37%
2022	N05 Santan	Azizan Sulaiman (UMNO)	2,644	31.38%	Che Mazlina Che Yob (AMANAH)	1,030	12.22%	8,426	2,108	78.37%
