= Razali Saad (politician) =

Malaysian politician, businessman, farmer and entrepreneur

Yang Berhormat Tuan Razali Saad MLA
- غزالي سعد

Member of the Perlis State Executive Council
- In office 25 November 2022 – 25 December 2025 (Agriculture, Agro-based Industries, Rural Development, Poverty Eradication, Plantation Industries and Commodities)
- Monarch: Sirajuddin
- Menteri Besar: Mohd Shukri Ramli
- Preceded by: Nurulhisham Yaakob (Agriculture, Agro-based Industries, Plantation Industries and Commodities); Asmaiza Ahmad (Rural Development and Poverty Eradication)
- Succeeded by: TBA
- Constituency: Simpang Empat

Member of the Perlis State Legislative Assembly for Simpang Empat
- Incumbent
- Assumed office 19 November 2022
- Preceded by: Nurulhisham Yaakob (BN–UMNO)
- Majority: 4,008 (2022)

Faction represented in Perlis State Legislative Assembly
- 2022–: Perikatan Nasional

Personal details
- Born: Razali bin Saad; 31 August 1965 (age 61) Perlis, Malaysia
- Citizenship: Malaysian
- Party: Malaysian Islamic Party (PAS)
- Other political affiliations: Perikatan Nasional (PN)
- Children: 3
- Education: Al Madrasah Al Alawiyah Ad Diniah Religious Secondary School, Arau, Perlis
- Alma mater: Cultural College, Kota Bharu, Kelantan
- Occupation: Politician; businessman; entrepreneur; farmer

Yang Berhormat Tuan Razali Saad (born 31 August 1965) is a Malaysian politician, businessman, entrepreneur and farmer who has served as Member of the Perlis State Legislative Assembly (MLA) for Simpang Empat since November 2022. He served as Member of the Perlis State Executive Council (EXCO) in the Perikatan Nasional (PN) state administration under Menteri Besar Mohd Shukri Ramli from November 2022 to December 2025. He is a member of the Malaysian Islamic Party (PAS), a component party of the PN coalition. He is the State Committee Member of PN of Perlis and Division Treasurer of PAS of Arau.

== Personal life ==
Razali was born in Perlis, Malaysia on 31 August 1965. He is also married and has three children with her wife.

== Political career ==
=== Member of the Perlis State Executive Council (since 2022) ===
In the 2022 Perlis state election, the ruling Barisan Nasional (BN) suffered from huge defeat and wipeout in the assembly as none of its candidates won a state seat in the elections after losing all the 10 seats it previously held to PN. The elections ended 63-year rule of BN in the state, saw the first ever transition of power in the history of the state and replaced BN with PN as the ruling coalition and dominant political force in the state as PN won 14 out of 15 state seats and therefore two-thirds supermajority of the assembly. Therefore, State Chairman of PN of Perlis, State Commissioner of PAS of Perlis and Sanglang MLA Mohd Shukri replaced Azlan Man as the new and 10th Menteri Besar of Perlis and formed a new PN state administration on 22 November 2022. On 25 November 2022, Razali was appointed as the Perlis State EXCO Member in charge of Agriculture, Agro-based Industries, Rural Development, Poverty Eradication, Plantation Industries and Commodities by Menteri Besar Mohd Shukri.

=== Member of the Perlis State Legislative Assembly (since 2022) ===
==== 2022 Perlis state election ====
In the 2022 state election, Razali made his electoral debut after being nominated by PN to contest for the Simpang Empat state seat. He won the seat and was elected into the Perlis State Legislative Assembly as the Simpang Empat MLA after defeating defending MLA Nurulhisham Yaakob of BN, Amran Darus of Pakatan Harapan (PH), independent candidate Ammar Hassan, Izhar Sudin of the Homeland Fighters Party (PEJUANG) and Hakim Saad of the Heritage Party (WARISAN) by the majority of 4,008 votes.

== Other careers ==
Besides his political positions, Razali is also the Simpang Empat E1 unit chief farmer and a liquefied petroleum gas entrepreneur. In addition, he holds the positions of Director of the Action Committee of Simpang Empat, Chairman of the Sungai Baru Al Hasanah Islamic Nursery Centre (PASTI), Member of the Assabiqun Committee of Perlis, Chairman of the Funeral Management Committee of Simpang Empat, Chairman of the Simpang Ampat Caring Community Organisation (PriSA) non-governmental organisation (NGO) and Chairman of the Kampung Baru Feast Alliance.

== Election results ==
Perlis State Legislative Assembly
| Year | Constituency | Candidate | Votes | Pct | Opponent(s) | Votes | Pct | Ballots cast | Majority | Turnout |
|---|---|---|---|---|---|---|---|---|---|---|
| 2022 | N14 Simpang Empat | Razali Saad (PAS) | 5,388 | 66.40% | Nurulhisham Yaakob (UMNO) | 1,380 | 17.01% | 8,115 | 4,008 | 75.86% |
| 2022 | N14 Simpang Empat | Razali Saad (PAS) | 5,388 | 66.40% | Amran Darus (PKR) | 1,111 | 13.69% | 8,115 | 4,008 | 75.86% |
| 2022 | N14 Simpang Empat | Razali Saad (PAS) | 5,388 | 66.40% | Ammar Hassan (Independent) | 128 | 1.58% | 8,115 | 4,008 | 75.86% |
| 2022 | N14 Simpang Empat | Razali Saad (PAS) | 5,388 | 66.40% | Izhar Sudin (PEJUANG) | 73 | 0.90% | 8,115 | 4,008 | 75.86% |
| 2022 | N14 Simpang Empat | Razali Saad (PAS) | 5,388 | 66.40% | Hakim Saad (WARISAN) | 35 | 0.43% | 8,115 | 4,008 | 75.86% |

== Honours ==
- Perlis
  - Recipient of Tuanku Syed Sirajuddin Jamalullail Silver Jubilee Medal (2025)
