= 2022 Perlis state election =

Malaysian state election

- 19 November 2022

All 15 seats to the Perlis State Legislative Assembly 8 seats needed for a majority
- Registered: 195,927

	Majority party	Minority party	Third party
Leader	Mohd Shukri Ramli	Noor Amin Ahmad	Azlan Man
Party	PAS	PKR	UMNO
Alliance	Perikatan Nasional	Pakatan Harapan	Barisan Nasional
Leader since	30 March 2021	10 May 2021	7 May 2013
Leader's seat	Sanglang	Did not stand	Bintong (defeated)
Last election	2 seats, 36.33%	3 seats, 24.54%	10 seats, 39.02%
Seats before	2 seats	3 seats	10 seats
Seats after	14	1	0
Seat change	▲12	▼2	▼10
Popular vote	77,504	27,856	36,301
Percentage	52.29%	18.79%	24.49%
Swing	▲15.96% (Note: Swing from the combined percentage of votes between PAS and BERSATU in 2018, which was part of the Pakatan Harapan that year)	▼5.75% (Note: Swing from the percentage of votes for Pakatan Harapan in 2018, but excluding BERSATU which has since joined Perikatan Nasional)	▼14.53%
Menteri Besar before election
Azlan Man
BN–UMNO
Elected Menteri Besar
Mohd Shukri Ramli
PN-PAS

The 2022 Perlis state election, formally the 15th Perlis state election, took place in Malaysia on 19 November 2022. This election was to elect 15 members of the 15th Perlis State Legislative Assembly. The previous assembly was dissolved on 14 October 2022.

The incumbent Barisan Nasional (BN) coalition faced a historic wipeout (first time in Perlis and second time in national level), winning no seats. The Perikatan Nasional (PN) coalition won 14 of 15 seats (achieving supermajority) and formed the first ever non-UMNO/BN government in the state's history. Pakatan Harapan (PH) meanwhile won only one seat, becoming the sole opposition in the state assembly.

== Constituencies ==
Map of constituencies to be contested

== Composition before dissolution ==
BN		PN	PH
10		2	3
9	1	2	3
UMNO	MCA	PAS	PKR

== Electoral candidates ==
The official list of candidates was published on 5 November 2022 by Election Commission (SPR).

No.	Parliamentary Constituency	No.	State Constituency	Incumbent State Assemblymen	Coalition (Party)	Political coalitions and parties											
No.	Parliamentary Constituency	No.	State Constituency	Incumbent State Assemblymen	Coalition (Party)	Barisan Nasional		Pakatan Harapan		Perikatan Nasional		Gerakan Tanah Air (informal coalition)		Other parties/Independents			
No.	Parliamentary Constituency	No.	State Constituency	Incumbent State Assemblymen	Coalition (Party)	Candidate name	Party	Candidate name	Party	Candidate name	Party	Candidate name	Party	Candidate name	Party	Candidate name	Party
P001	Padang Besar	N01	Titi Tinggi	Teh Chai Ann	BN (MCA)	Teh Chai Ann	MCA	Teh Seng Chuan	DAP	Izizam Ibrahim	BERSATU	Mohd Shahril Md Sarif	PEJUANG	Khaw Hock Kong	WARISAN	Zahidi Zainul Abidin	IND
P001	Padang Besar	N02	Beseri	Rozaini Rais	BN (UMNO)	Rozaini Rais	UMNO	Mat Safar Saad	AMANAH	Haziq Asyraf Dun	PAS			Mohd Shamim M Nurdin	WARISAN		
P001	Padang Besar	N03	Chuping	Asmaiza Ahmad	BN (UMNO)	Asmaiza Ahmad	UMNO	Natthavuth Seng	PKR	Saad Seman	PAS						
P001	Padang Besar	N04	Mata Ayer	Siti Berenee Yahaya	BN (UMNO)	Siti Berenee Yahaya	UMNO	Amran Kamarudin	PKR	Wan Badariah Wan Saad	PAS						
P001	Padang Besar	N05	Santan	Azizan Sulaiman	BN (UMNO)	Azizan Sulaiman	UMNO	Che Mazlina Che Yob	AMANAH	Muhammad Azmir Azizan	PAS						
P002	Kangar	N06	Bintong	Azlan Man	BN (UMNO)	Azlan Man	UMNO	Azhari Ahmad	AMANAH	Fakhrul Anwar Ismail	PAS	Shazwan Suban	PEJUANG	Mohamad Khair Mohd Noor	WARISAN	Hashim Suboh	IND
P002	Kangar	N07	Sena	Asrul Nizan Abd Jalil	PH (PKR)	Saiful Daniel Mohd Yusof	UMNO	Asrul Nizan Abd Jalil	PKR	Marzita Mansor	BERSATU	Mohd Faizal Yunus	PEJUANG				
P002	Kangar	N08	Indera Kayangan	Gan Ay Ling	PH (PKR)	Lim Weng Khee	MCA	Gan Ay Ling	PKR	Pramoot Puan	BERSATU			Atan Jasin	WARISAN		
P002	Kangar	N09	Kuala Perlis	Nor Azam Karap	PH (PKR)	Kamarudin Malek	UMNO	Nor Azam Karap	PKR	Abu Bakar Hamzah	BERSATU			Muhamad Hairi Noordin	WARISAN	Azahar Ahmad	IND
P002	Kangar	N10	Kayang	Hamizan Hassan	BN (UMNO)	Hamizan Hassan	UMNO	Wan Kharizal Wan Khazim	AMANAH	Asrul Aimran Abd Jalil	PAS			Khairuddin Abdullah	WARISAN		
P003	Arau	N11	Pauh	Rozieana Ahmad	BN (UMNO)	Syed Atif Syed Abu Bakar	UMNO	Azhar Ameir	PKR	Megat Hashirat Hassan	BERSATU			Mohd Khalid Ahmad	WARISAN		
P003	Arau	N12	Tambun Tulang	Ismail Kassim	BN (UMNO)	Ismail Kassim	UMNO	Muhammad Syahmi Suhaimi	PKR	Wan Zikri Afthar Ishak	BERSATU	Maton Din	PEJUANG				
P003	Arau	N13	Guar Sanji	Mohd Ridzuan Hashim	PN (PAS)	Rozieana Ahmad	UMNO	Hasparizal Hassan	PKR	Mohd Ridzuan Hashim	PAS	Abdul Malik Abdullah	PEJUANG				
P003	Arau	N14	Simpang Empat	Nurulhisham Yaakob	BN (UMNO)	Nurulhisham Yaakob	UMNO	Amran Darus	PKR	Razali Saad	PAS	Izhar Kamarudin Sudin	PEJUANG	Wan Noralhakim Shaghir Saad	WARISAN	Ammar Hassan	IND
P003	Arau	N15	Sanglang	Mohd. Shukri Ramli	PN (PAS)	Sharifudin Ahmad	UMNO	Ahmad Fadzhil Mohamad	AMANAH	Mohd. Shukri Ramli	PAS			Zainudin Yom	WARISAN		

== Results ==
Election results map

Party or alliance		Votes	%	Seats	+/–
Perikatan Nasional	Pan-Malaysian Islamic Party	49,803	33.60	9	+7
Perikatan Nasional	Malaysian United Indigenous Party	27,701	18.69	5	+5
Perikatan Nasional	Total	77,504	52.29	14	+12
Barisan Nasional	United Malays National Organisation	32,603	22.00	0	–9
Barisan Nasional	Malaysian Chinese Association	3,698	2.50	0	–1
Barisan Nasional	Total	36,301	24.49	0	–10
Pakatan Harapan	People's Justice Party	19,270	13.00	1	–2
Pakatan Harapan	National Trust Party	7,074	4.77	0	0
Pakatan Harapan	Democratic Action Party	1,512	1.02	0	0
Pakatan Harapan	Total	27,856	18.79	1	–2
Heritage Party		2,739	1.85	0	New
Gerakan Tanah Air	Homeland Fighter's Party	905	0.61	0	New
Independents		2,907	1.96	0	0
Total		148,212	100.00	15	0
Valid votes		148,212	98.55		
Invalid/blank votes		2,182	1.45		
Total votes		150,394	100.00		
Registered voters/turnout		195,927	76.76		
Source: SPR SPR

=== By parliamentary constituency ===
Perikatan Nasional won all of 3 parliamentary constituency.

No.	Constituency	Barisan Nasional	Pakatan Harapan	Perikatan Nasional	Member of Parliament
P001	Padang Besar	29.33%	14.60%	54.41%	Zahidi Zainul Abidin (14th Parliament)
P001	Padang Besar	29.33%	14.60%	54.41%	Rushdan Rusmi (15th Parliament)
P002	Kangar	22.37%	26.13%	44.92%	Noor Amin Ahmad (14th Parliament)
P002	Kangar	22.37%	26.13%	44.92%	Zakri Hassan (15th Parliament)
P003	Arau	22.35%	14.06%	59.09%	Shahidan Kassim

=== Seats that changed allegiance ===
No.	Seat	Previous Party (2018)	Current Party (2022)
N01	Titi Tinggi	Barisan Nasional (MCA)	Perikatan Nasional (BERSATU)
N02	Beseri	Barisan Nasional (UMNO)	Perikatan Nasional (PAS)
N03	Chuping	Barisan Nasional (UMNO)	Perikatan Nasional (PAS)
N04	Mata Ayer	Barisan Nasional (UMNO)	Perikatan Nasional (PAS)
N05	Santan	Barisan Nasional (UMNO)	Perikatan Nasional (PAS)
N06	Bintong	Barisan Nasional (UMNO)	Perikatan Nasional (PAS)
N07	Sena	Pakatan Harapan (PKR)	Perikatan Nasional (BERSATU)
N09	Kuala Perlis	Pakatan Harapan (PKR)	Perikatan Nasional (BERSATU)
N10	Kayang	Barisan Nasional (UMNO)	Perikatan Nasional (PAS)
N11	Pauh	Barisan Nasional (UMNO)	Perikatan Nasional (BERSATU)
N12	Tambun Tulang	Barisan Nasional (UMNO)	Perikatan Nasional (BERSATU)
N14	Simpang Empat	Barisan Nasional (UMNO)	Perikatan Nasional (PAS)

== Aftermath ==
Mohd Shukri Ramli from PAS was sworn in as the new Menteri Besar on 22 November 2022, while the 6 state EXCO members were sworn in on 25 November 2022. Gan Ay Ling, the sole opposition member of the Assembly, was made the Opposition Leader.

The government of Mohd Shukri collapsed in December 2025, after majority of the Member of Assembly from his own PN coalition announced their non-confidence of him in a statutory declaration. This results of Mohd Shukri's resignation as Menteri Besar, and ascension of Abu Bakar Hamzah from BERSATU as the new Menteri Besar with EXCO members solely from BERSATU. The crisis also resulted in sacking of PAS Member of Legislative Assembly who supported the no confidence declaration from the party, and deterioration of PAS-BERSATU relationship in the PN coalition.

== See also ==
- 2022 Malaysian general election
- Politics of Malaysia
- List of political parties in Malaysia
