= Simpang Empat (state constituency) =

State constituency in Perlis, Malaysia

Simpang Empat (N14)
Perlis constituency

State constituency
- Legislature: Perlis State Legislative Assembly
MLA
Razali Saad
PN
- Constituency created: 1994
- First contested: 1995
- Last contested: 2022

Demographics
- Electors (2022): 10,697

Simpang Empat is a state constituency in Perlis, Malaysia, that has been represented in the Perlis State Legislative Assembly.

The state constituency was created in 1994. It was first contested in 1995 and is mandated to return a single Assemblyman to the Perlis State Legislative Assembly under the first-past-the-post voting system. Since 2022, the State Assemblyman for Simpang Empat is Razali Saad from Perikatan Nasional (PN).

== Definition ==
=== Polling districts ===
According to the federal gazette issued on 31 October 2022, the Simpang Empat constituency is divided into 5 polling districts.

State constituency	Polling Districts	Code	Location
Simpang Empat (N14)	Sungai Berembang	003/14/01	SK Sungai Berembang
Simpang Empat (N14)	Behor Mali	003/14/02	SK Bohor Mali
Simpang Empat (N14)	Sungai Bahru	003/14/03	SK Sungai Baru
Simpang Empat (N14)	Simpang Empat Che Kassim	003/14/04	SK Simpang Ampat
Simpang Empat (N14)	Lat Seribu	003/14/05	SJK (C) Simpang Ampat

== Demographics ==
Ethnic breakdown of Simpang Empat's electorate as of 2022
1. Malay (90.6%)
2. Chinese (8.60%)
3. Other ethnicities (0.51%)
4. Indian (0.33%)

Total electors by polling district in 2016
Polling district	Electors
Sungai Berembang	1,093
Behor Mali	921
Sungai Bharu	2,408
Simpang Empat Che Kasim	1,806
Lat Seribu	1,500
Total	7,728
Source: Malaysian Election Commission

== History ==
Members of the Legislative Assembly for Simpang Empat
Assembly	No	Years	Member	Party
Constituency created from Utan Aji, Kayang and Sanglang
9th	N14	1995–1999	Ramlah @ Che Ah Long	BN (UMNO)
10th	N14	1999–2004	Zahari Bakar	BN (UMNO)
11th	N14	2004–2008	Zahari Bakar	BN (UMNO)
12th	N14	2008–2013	Rus'sele Eizan	PR (PAS)
13th	N14	2013–2018	Nurulhisham Yaakob	BN (UMNO)
14th	N14	2018–2022	Nurulhisham Yaakob	BN (UMNO)
15th	N14	2022–present	Razali Saad	PN (PAS)

== Election results ==
Perlis state election, 2022
Party	Candidate	Votes	%	∆%
PN	Razali Saad	5,388	66.40	▲66.40
BN	Nurulhisham Yaakob	1,380	17.01	▼17.45
PH	Amran Darus	1,111	13.69	▲13.69
Independent	Ammar Hassan	128	1.58	▲1.58
PEJUANG	Izhar Sudin	73	0.90	▲0.90
Heritage	Hakim Saad	35	0.43	▲0.43
Total valid votes		8,115	100.00	
Total rejected ballots		140		
Unreturned ballots		17		
Turnout		9,210	80.0	▼10.14
Registered electors		10,697		
Majority		4,008	49.39	▲48.21
PN gain from BN		Swing		?

Perlis state election, 2018
Party	Candidate	Votes	%	∆%
BN	Nurulhisham Yaakob	2,528	36.46	▼14.18
PAS	Rus'sele Eizan	2,446	35.28	▼14.08
PKR	Wan Noralhakim Shaghir Saad	1,960	28.26	▲28.26
Total valid votes		6,934	100.00	
Total rejected ballots		121		
Unreturned ballots		649		
Turnout		7,704	90.14	▲3.58
Registered electors		8,547		
Majority		82	1.18	▼0.10
BN hold		Swing		BN

Perlis state election, 2013
Party	Candidate	Votes	%	∆%
BN	Nurulhisham Yaakob	3,362	50.64	▲1.10
PAS	Rus'sele Eizan	3,277	49.36	▼1.10
Total valid votes		6,639	100.00	
Total rejected ballots		70		
Unreturned ballots		20		
Turnout		6,729	86.56	▲3.58
Registered electors		7,774		
Majority		85	1.28	▲0.36
BN gain from PAS		Swing		?
Source(s) "Federal Government Gazette - Notice of Contested Election, State Legislative Assembly for the State of Perlis [P.U. (B) 185/2013]" (PDF). Attorney General's Chambers of Malaysia. 26 April 2013. "Federal Government Gazette - Results of Contested Election and Statements of the Poll after the Official Addition of Votes, State Constituencies for the State of Perlis [P.U. (B) 226/2013]" (PDF). Attorney General's Chambers of Malaysia. 22 May 2013.

Perlis state election, 2008
Party	Candidate	Votes	%	∆%
PAS	Rus'sele Eizan	2,878	50.46	▲3.06
BN	Zahari Bakar	2,825	49.54	▼3.06
Total valid votes		5,703	100.00	
Total rejected ballots		82		
Unreturned ballots		8		
Turnout		5,793	82.98	▼0.13
Registered electors		6,981		
Majority		53	0.92	▼4.28
PAS gain from BN		Swing		?

Perlis state election, 2004
Party	Candidate	Votes	%	∆%
BN	Zahari Bakar	2,795	52.60	▲0.08
PAS	Che Rosli Che Mat	2,519	47.40	▼0.08
Total valid votes		5,314	100.00	
Total rejected ballots		133		
Unreturned ballots				
Turnout		5,447	83.11	▲2.68
Registered electors		6,554		
Majority		276	5.20	▲0.16
BN hold		Swing		

Perlis state election, 1999
Party	Candidate	Votes	%	∆%
BN	Zahari Bakar	2,584	52.52	▼7.91
PAS	Che Rosli Che Mat	2,336	47.48	▲7.91
Total valid votes		4,920	100.00	
Total rejected ballots		107		
Unreturned ballots		6		
Turnout		5,033	80.43	▲6.51
Registered electors		6,258		
Majority		248	5.04	▼15.82
BN hold		Swing		

Perlis state election, 1995
Party	Candidate	Votes	%
BN	Ramlah @ Che Ah Long	2,721	60.43
S46	Ramli Abdul Karim	1,782	39.57
Total valid votes		4,503	100.00
Total rejected ballots		111	
Unreturned ballots		6	
Turnout		4,620	73.92
Registered electors		6,250	
Majority		939	20.86
This was a new constituency created.
