= Perlis State Legislative Assembly =

State Legislative Assembly

Perlis State Legislative Assembly Dewan Undangan Negeri Perlis ديوان اوندڠن نݢري ڤرليس
- 15th Perlis State Legislative Assembly

Type
- Type: Unicameral

History
- Founded: 1959

Leadership
- Raja: Sirajuddin since 17 April 2000
- Speaker: Rus'sele Eizan, PAS since 19 December 2022
- Menteri Besar: Abu Bakar Hamzah, PN–BERSATU since 28 December 2025
- Opposition Leader: Gan Ay Ling, PH–PKR since 19 December 2022
- Secretary: Mohd Anwar Sahul Hameed

Structure
- Seats: 15; Quorum: 5 Simple majority: 8 Two-thirds majority: 10
- Political groups: (As of 31 October 2026) Government (5) PN (5): BERSATU (5); Confidence and supply (5) PN (5): PAS (5); Opposition (1) PH (1): PKR (1); Vacant (4) Speaker (1) non-MLA
- Committees: 5: Committee of Selection; Public Accounts Committee; House Committee; Committee of Privileges; Standing Orders Committee

Elections
- Voting system: Plurality: First-past-the-post (15 single-member constituencies)
- Last election: 19 November 2022
- Next election: By 17 February 2028

Meeting place
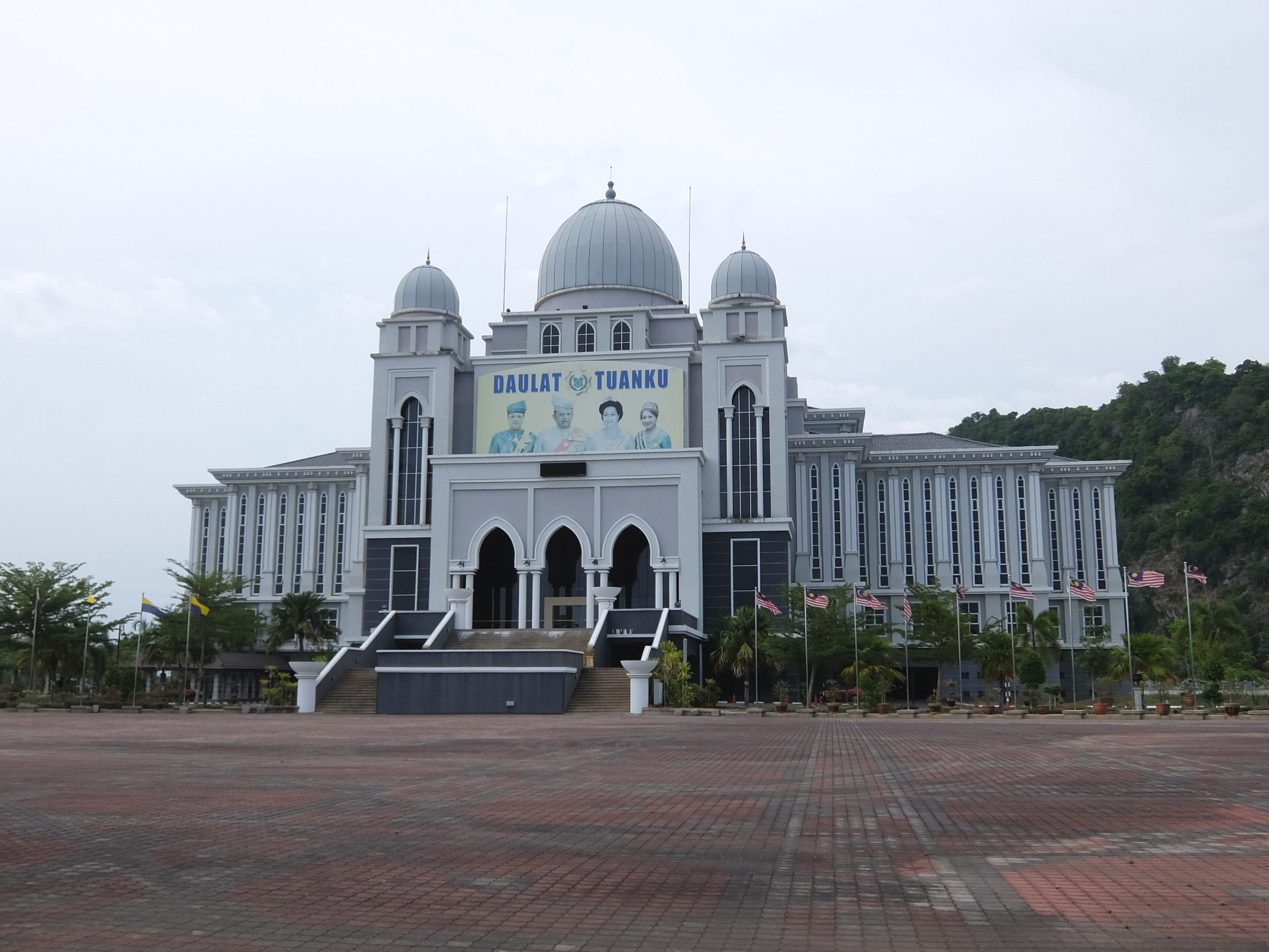
- Kompleks Seri Putra, Kangar, Perlis

Website
- www.perlis.gov.my

Map of current constituencies (since 2018)

The Perlis State Legislative Assembly (Malay: Dewan Undangan Negeri Perlis) is the state legislature of the Malaysian state of Perlis. It is a unicameral institution, consisting of a total of 15 lawmakers representing single-member constituencies throughout the state. It is the smallest legislature in the nation in terms of members.

Members of the state legislature are called state assemblymen. The Assembly convenes at the Perlis State Assembly Complex in the state capital, Kangar. It has 15 seats, making it the smallest state assembly in Malaysia.

Out of the 15 seats, 14 are held by the Perikatan Nasional (PN) ruling coalition after the 2022 state election. Within the coalition, the Malaysian Islamic Party (PAS) holds 9 seats while the Malaysian United Indigenous Party (BERSATU) holds 5 seats. The PN coalition commands a two-thirds supermajority in the assembly.

Meanwhile, Pakatan Harapan (PH) - People's Justice Party (PKR) holds another and only 1 seat.

== Current composition ==
Government		Opposition
PN		PH	VAC
10		1	5
5	5	1	5
PAS	BERSATU	PKR	VAC

No.	Parliamentary constituency	No.	State Constituency	Member	Coalition (Party)	Post
-	-	#	Non-MLA	Rus'sele Eizan	PN (PAS)	Speaker
P001	Padang Besar	N01	Titi Tinggi	Izizam Ibrahim	PN (BERSATU)	EXCO Member
P001	Padang Besar	N02	Beseri	Haziq Asyraf Dun	PN (PAS)	N/A
P001	Padang Besar	N03	Chuping	Vacant		N/A
P001	Padang Besar	N04	Mata Ayer	Vacant		N/A
P001	Padang Besar	N05	Santan	Mohammad Azmir Azizan	PN (PAS)	N/A
P02	Kangar	N06	Bintong	Vacant		N/A
P02	Kangar	N07	Sena	Marzita Mansor	PN (BERSATU)	EXCO Member
P02	Kangar	N08	Indera Kayangan	Gan Ay Ling	PH (PKR)	Leader of the Opposition
P02	Kangar	N09	Kuala Perlis	Abu Bakar Hamzah	PN (BERSATU)	Menteri Besar
P02	Kangar	N10	Kayang	Asrul Aimran Abd Jalil	PN (PAS)	N/A
P03	Arau	N11	Pauh	Megat Hashirat Hassan	PN (BERSATU)	EXCO Member
P03	Arau	N12	Tambun Tulang	Wan Zikri Afthar Ishak	PN (BERSATU)	EXCO Member
P03	Arau	N13	Guar Sanji	Vacant		N/A
P03	Arau	N14	Simpang Empat	Razali Saad	PN (PAS)	N/A
P03	Arau	N15	Sanglang	Mohd Shukri Ramli	PN (PAS)	N/A

== Seating arrangement ==
Vacant	N08 Indera Kayangan (Opposition Leader)	Vacant	Vacant
N02 Beseri	C	B	Vacant
N03 Chuping	Sergeant-at-Arm	N12 Tambun Tulang (EXCO Member)
N14 Simpang Empat	N11 Pauh (EXCO Member)
N13 Guar Sanji (vacant)	N04 Mata Ayer (vacant)	D	the Mace	A	Vacant	State Financial Officer
N06 Bintong (vacant)	N05 Santan	N07 Sena (EXCO Member)	State Legal Advisor
N03 Chuping (vacant)	N10 Kayang	N01 Titi Tinggi (EXCO Member)	State Secretary
N15 Sanglang	Secretary	N09 Kuala Perlis (Menteri Besar)
Speaker
Raja

== Role ==
As the state's legislative body, the Perlis State Legislative Assembly's main function is to enact laws that apply to Perlis, known as enactments. The Speaker presides over the Assembly's proceedings, and works to maintain order during debates.

The state government's executive branch (known as the State Executive Council (EXCO), or Majlis Mesyuarat Kerajaan Negeri), including the Menteri Besar, are drawn from the Assembly. The Menteri Besar is ceremonially appointed by the Raja of Perlis on the basis that he is able to command a majority in the Assembly. The Menteri Besar then appoints members of the State EXCO drawing from members of the Assembly.

== Speakers Roll of Honour ==
The following is the Speaker of the Perlis State Legislative Assembly Roll of Honour, since 1959:

No.	Speaker	Term start	Term end	Party	Constituency
1	Mahmud Hashim	1978	1982	BN (UMNO)	Paya
2	Fadzil Mahmood	9 September 1986	4 October 1990	BN (UMNO)	Utan Aji
3	Azib Saad	1999	2004		Non-MLA
4	Che Sulaiman Shapie	2004	2008		Non-MLA
5	Yazid Mat	28 April 2008	27 June 2013		Non-MLA
6	Hamdan Bahari	28 June 2013	18 December 2022	BN (UMNO)	Non-MLA
7	Rus'sele Eizan	19 December 2022	Incumbent	PN (PAS)	Non-MLA

== Election pendulum ==
The 15th General Election witnessed 14 governmental seats and a non-governmental seat filled the Perlis State Legislative Assembly. The government side has 3 safe and 5 fairly safe seat, while the non-government side has no fairly safe or safe seat.

2022 Perlis state election

GOVERNMENT SEATS
Marginal
Kuala Perlis	Abu Bakar Hamzah	BERSATU	30.06
Pauh	Megat Hashirat Hassan	BERSATU	44.18
Beseri	Haziq Asyraf Dun	PAS	45.84
Sena	Marzita Mansor	BERSATU	47.27
Tambun Tulang	Wan Zikri Afthar Ishak	BERSATU	53.68
Chuping	Saad Seman	PAS	53.74
Fairly Safe
Santan	Azmir Azizan	PAS	56.40
Bintong	Fakhrul Anwar Ismail	PAS	57.58
Mata Ayer	Wan Badariyah Wan Saad	PAS	58.06
Kayang	Asrul Aimran Abd Jalil	PAS	58.31
Titi Tinggi	Izizam Ibrahim	BERSATU	58.42
Safe
Sanglang	Mohd Shukri Ramli	PAS	62.13
Simpang Empat	Razali Saad	PAS	66.40
Guar Sanji	Mohd. Ridzuan Hashim	PAS	74.20

NON-GOVERNMENT SEATS
Marginal
Indera Kayangan	Gan Ay Ling	PKR	46.42

== List of Assemblies ==
Assembly	Term began	Members	Committee	Governing parties
State Council	1955	17	Raja Ahmad I (1948–1957) Mohd Razali I (1957–1959)	Alliance (UMNO)
1st	1959	12	Sheikh Ahmad I	Alliance (UMNO–MCA)
2nd	1964	12	Sheikh Ahmad II	Alliance (UMNO–MCA)
3rd	1969	12	Sheikh Ahmad III (1969–1971)	Alliance (UMNO–MCA)
3rd	1969	12	Jaafar I (1972–1974)	Alliance (UMNO–MCA)–PAS (1972–1973)
3rd	1969	12	Jaafar I (1972–1974)	BN (UMNO–MCA–PAS) (1973–1974)
4th	1974	12	Jaafar II	BN (UMNO–MCA–PAS) (1974–1977) BN (UMNO–MCA) (1977–1978)
5th	1978	12	Jaafar III (1978–1981); Ali I (1981–1982)	BN (UMNO–MCA)
6th	1982	12	Ali II	BN (UMNO–MCA)
7th	1986	14	Abdul Hamid I	BN (UMNO–MCA)
8th	1990	14	Abdul Hamid II	BN (UMNO–MCA)
9th	1995	15	Shahidan I	BN (UMNO–MCA)
10th	1999	15	Shahidan II	BN (UMNO–MCA)
11th	2004	15	Shahidan III	BN (UMNO–MCA)
12th	2008	15	Md Isa	BN (UMNO–MCA)
13th	2013	15	Azlan I	BN (UMNO–MCA)
14th	2018	15	Azlan II	BN (UMNO–MCA) (2018–2019)
14th	2018	15	Azlan II	BN (UMNO–MCA)–PAS (2019–2020)
14th	2018	15	Azlan II	BN (UMNO–MCA)–PN (PAS) (2020–2022)
15th	2022	15	Mohd Shukri (2022–2025); Abu Bakar (since 2025)	PN (PAS–BERSATU)
