= 2025 Perlis political crisis =

Political crisis in Perlis, Malaysia

- Date: 22–28 December 2025
- Location: Perlis, Malaysia
- Cause: Withdrawal of support from 8 assemblymen.; Alleged conspiracy by BERSATU to oust PAS and install their own Menteri Besar nominee.
- Participants: Members of 15th Perlis State Legislative Assembly; Menteri Besar of Perlis
- Outcome: Mohd Shukri Ramli resigns as Menteri Besar; Abu Bakar Hamzah sworn in as 11th Menteri Besar; PAS terminates the membership of Chuping, Bintong, and Guar Sanji assemblymen, and declares their seats vacant; Deterioration of BERSATU-PAS relations; Mass resignations of several key leaders in Perikatan Nasional, including Chairman Muhyiddin Yassin

The 2025 Perlis political crisis began on 22 December 2025, after 8 members of the Perlis State Legislative Assembly withdrew support for Menteri Besar Mohd Shukri Ramli. The subsequent crisis resulted in the resignation of Ramli and the accession of Abu Bakar Hamzah as the new Menteri Besar of Perlis, the sacking of the assemblymen for Chuping, Bintong, and Guar Sanji, and an internal dispute within Perikatan Nasional (PN).

== Background ==
Perikatan Nasional (PN) came to power in Perlis following a landslide victory at the 2022 Perlis state election, winning 14 out of 15 seats. Mohd Shukri Ramli from the Malaysian Islamic Party (PAS) was subsequently appointed Menteri Besar of Perlis.

In 2024, Ramli had been interrogated by the Malaysian Anti-Corruption Commission (MACC) over his son's involvement in a graft scandal. He was later called in again over a suspected case of abuse of power.

Earlier on 22 December 2025, it was reported that Ramli was hospitalised in Kuala Lumpur for chest pains, after returning overseas from an official trip to China.

== Events ==
=== Withdrawal of support from 8 PN assemblymen ===
On 22 December 2025, 8 PN assemblymen (5 from BERSATU and 3 from PAS), announced they had withdrew support for Ramli and had submitted statutory declarations to the Raja of Perlis. The 5 assemblymen from BERSATU were Abu Bakar Hamzah (Kuala Perlis), Izizam Ibrahim (Titi Tinggi), Megat Hashirat Hassan (Pauh), Wan Zikri Afthar Ishak (Tambun Tulang) and Marzita Mansor (Sena), while the 3 PAS assemblymen were alleged to be Saad Seman (Chuping), Fakhrul Anwar Ismail (Bintong), and Mohd Ridzuan Hashim (Guar Sanji).

As a majority of PN assemblymen withdrew support, Ramli had lost confidence from the state assembly to continue in the position as Menteri Besar.

=== Sacking of the 3 PAS assemblymen ===
On 24 December 2025, PAS announced it had sacked the membership of Saad Seman, Fakhrul Anwar Ismail, and Mohd Ridzuan Hashim following their move of withdrawing their support for Ramli. The party also announced that it would seek to declare the seats vacant and notify the Election Commission (EC) for by-elections in the 3 seats, despite exceeding the constitutional 3-year limit for when a by-election can be held. The need for by-elections were subsequently retracted by the Speaker of the Perlis State Assembly, Rus'sele Eizan, on 31 December 2025 but highlighted that the seats will remain vacant until the next state election.

PAS also called on coalition partner, BERSATU, to similarly take disciplinary action against their 5 assemblymen who also withdrew support. PAS president Abdul Hadi Awang said BERSATU's decision should be left to their "conscience", while emphasising that political solidarity ought to guide their actions.

On 2 January 2026, the three assemblymen announced they had filed a legal challenge against Speaker Rus'sele Eizan, claiming he had overstepped his lawful authority as Speaker by declaring their seats vacant.

=== Resignation of Mohd Shukri Ramli and accession of Abu Bakar Hamzah ===
On 25 December 2025, Mohd Shukri Ramli resigned as Menteri Besar, citing health reasons. Despite the ongoing crisis, Ramli emphasised his resignation was "due to his health and his choice to relinquish the position, and not related to any other matters". Ramli stated later that day that he was unaware of any plans for withdrawals of support, learning about them only on the day they occurred.

Following Ramli's resignation, media speculation had centered around several possible contenders for his successor. PAS' Azmir Azizan, the assemblyman for Santan and Asrul Aimran Abd Jalil, the assemblyman for Kayang, along with BERSATU's Abu Bakar Hamzah, the assemblyman for Kuala Perlis were named as the likeliest candidates. PAS submitted a list of names to the Raja on 26 December, but this list was not made public.

On 28 December 2025, Abu Bakar Hamzah was officially sworn in as the next Menteri Besar of Perlis in front of an audience of the Raja of Perlis, Tuanku Syed Sirajuddin Jamalullail. The Raja also called for the end of speculation and accusations sparked during the crisis, and urged all sides to focus on the development of the state.

=== Internal crisis in PN ===
Amidst the turmoil, UMNO Youth Chief Muhamad Akmal Saleh invited PAS to dissolve PN and revive the Muafakat Nasional pact both parties had shared prior to the 2022 general election. However, PAS information chief Ahmad Fadhli Shaari while agreeing to Akmal's statement, said the revival can only take place if UMNO and Barisan Nasional (BN) leaves the alliance it shares with Pakatan Harapan (PH).

On 28 December 2025, several leaders from PAS had accused BERSATU of betrayal following the appointment of Hamzah as Menteri Besar, with PAS treasurer Iskandar Abdul Samad saying BERSATU had "revealed its true colours" and that "betrayal must not go unpunished". Similarly on 29 December, PAS' Tasek Gelugor Youth Wing called on the party's central leadership to sever all ties with BERSATU after alleging the latter party had conspired to remove Mohd Shukri Ramli from the Menteri Besar post. PAS secretary-general Takiyuddin Hassan would later announce that the party will not be a part of the Hamzah-led Perlis State Executive Council (EXCO), and that all remaining PAS EXCO members will resign in solidarity with Ramli.

On 30 December 2025, Muhyiddin Yassin expressed his intention to resign as Chairman of Perikatan Nasional on 1 January 2026, with media citing pressure from PAS as a possible reason. At the same time, several other PN leaders also signalled their intention to resign, including PN secretary-general Azmin Ali, Johor PN chairman Sahruddin Jamal, Perak PN chairman Ahmad Faizal Azumu, Selangor PN secretary-general Afif Bahardin, and Negeri Sembilan PN chairman Mohamad Hanifah Abu Baker.

== Response ==
Pakatan Harapan (PH), which holds the sole opposition seat in the state assembly with Gan Ay Ling in Indera Kayangan, expressed support for the incumbent Perlis state government to continue until the end of the term, emphasising the need for government stability.

Prime Minister Anwar Ibrahim rebuked the division among the opposition, expressing gratitude that there are no elements of "sabotage or betrayal" in the Unity Government, and described the government as "stronger and more sincere than opposition politics".

== See also ==
- 2009 Perak constitutional crisis
- 2020-22 Malaysian political crisis
- 2023 Sabah political crisis
- 2026 Negeri Sembilan constitutional crisis
