= Government of Perlis =

Malaysian state government

- Kerajaan Negeri Perlis
- State government
- Coat of arms of Perlis

Overview
- Established: 31 August 1957 (as a Malaysian state)
- State: Perlis
- Leader: Menteri Besar
- Appointed by: Raja
- Main organ: Perlis State Executive Council
- Ministries: 12 departments
- Responsible to: Perlis State Legislative Assembly
- Annual budget: RM359.58 million
- Headquarters: Government Administrative Complex, Persiaran Wawasan, Kangar
- Website: www.perlis.gov.my

The Government of Perlis refers to the state government of Perlis. Its powers and structure are set out in the Laws of the Constitution of Perlis 1959 (Malay: Undang-undang Tubuh Kerajaan Perlis 1959).

In modern Malaysian use, the term "government" refers broadly to the cabinet (formally the Executive Council of Perlis) of the day, elected from the Perlis State Legislative Assembly and the non-political staff within each state department or agency – that is, the civil and public services. The civil service that manages and delivers government policies, programs, and services is called the Perlis Public Service.

The state of Perlis, like all Malaysian states, is governed by a constitutional monarchy and parliamentary democracy with a unicameral legislature—the Perlis State Legislative Assembly, which operates in the Westminster system of government. The political party or coalition that wins the largest number of seats in the legislature normally forms the government, and the party's leader becomes Menteri Besar of the state, i.e., the head of the government.

== Executive ==
=== Head of government and Cabinet ===
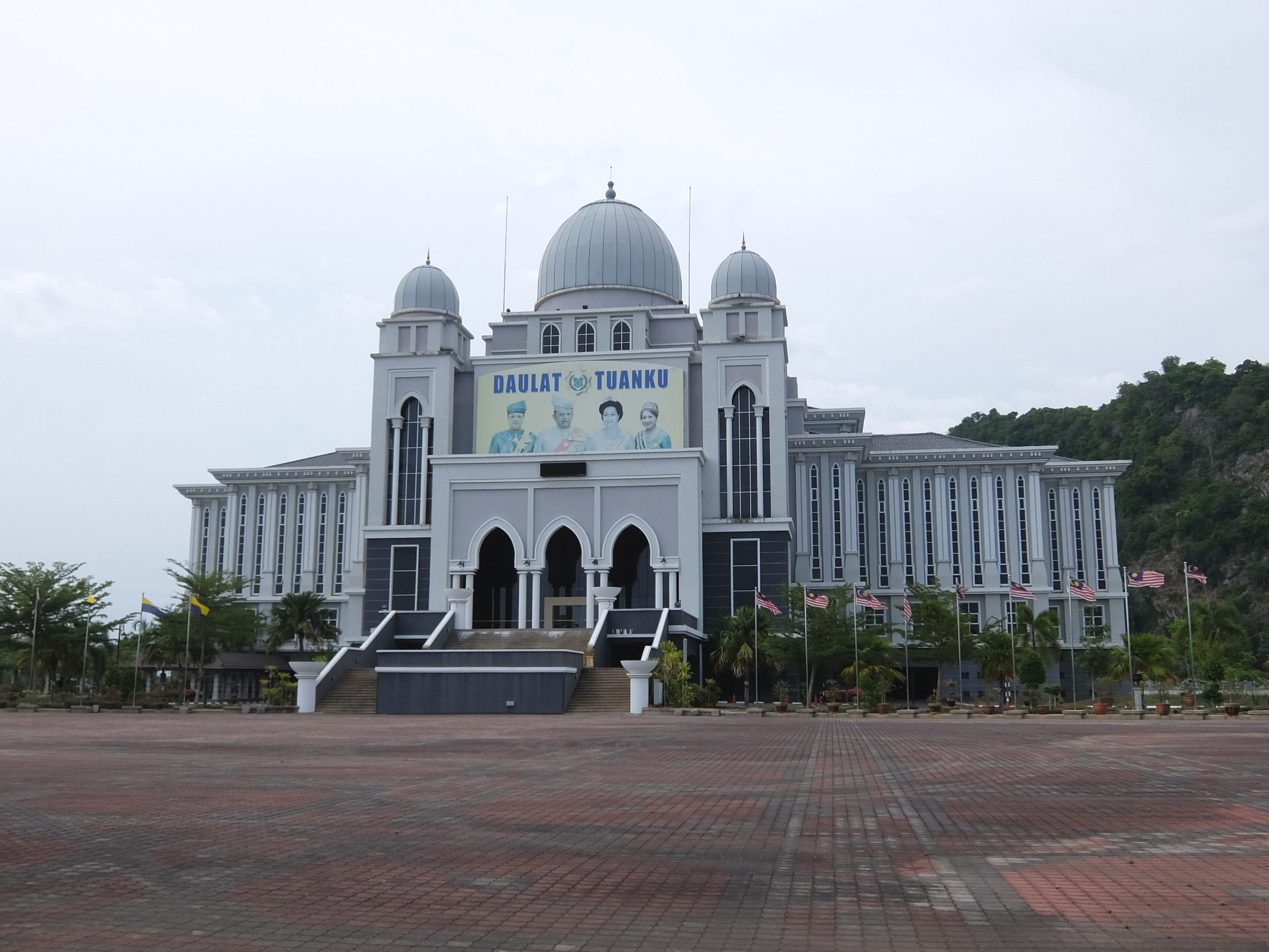
Perlis State Government Administrative Complex Legislative Building.

Almost always made up of members of the Perlis State Legislative Assembly, the Executive Council of Perlis (Majlis Mesyuarat Kerajaan Negeri Perlis) is similar in structure and role to the Cabinet of Malaysia while being smaller in size. As federal and state responsibilities differ there are a number of different portfolios between the federal and state governments.

The Raja of Perlis serve as constitutional and ceremonial head of state of Perlis. Although the Raja is technically the most powerful person in Perlis, he is in reality a figurehead whose actions are restricted by custom and constitutional convention. The government is therefore headed by the Menteri Besar. The Menteri Besar is normally a member of the Legislative Assembly, and draws all the members of the Executive Council from among the members of the Legislative Assembly. Most executive councillors are the chairman of a committee, but this is not always the case.

The executive powers in the state are vested in the monarch and are exercised by the Menteri Besar of Perlis and the Executive Council, who are responsible to the Perlis State Legislative Assembly, advising the Raja on how to exercise the Royal Prerogative and other executive powers. In the construct of constitutional monarchy and responsible government, the executive councillors advice tendered is typically binding. Despite appearances of the contrary, the Royal Prerogative belongs to the Crown, not to any of the executive councillors.

At the federal level the most important Executive Council post after that of the leader, is Executive Councillor in charge of Finance. The next most powerful position is the health portfolio which has a large budget and is of central importance. Other portfolios include Education and Security.

PN (5)
- BERSATU (5)

Members since 28 December 2025 has been :

Name	Portfolio	Party	Constituency	Term start	Term end
Abu Bakar Hamzah (Menteri Besar)	Administration and Finance; Economic Planning and Industrial Development; Land and Natural Resources; Tourism, Arts and Culture; Facilities and Infrastructure; Security and Border Relations	BERSATU	Kuala Perlis	28 December 2025	Incumbent
Izizam Ibrahim	Islamic Religion Affairs; Housing and Local Government; Domestic Trade, Cooperatives and Consumerism; Human Resource Development	BERSATU	Titi Tinggi	8 January 2026	Incumbent
Marzita Mansor	Women, Family and Community Development; Education; Social Unity; Welfare and Poverty Eradication	BERSATU	Sena	8 January 2026	Incumbent
Megat Hashirat Hassan	Agriculture; Health; Entrepreneur Development and Cooperatives; Environment	BERSATU	Pauh	8 January 2026	Incumbent
Wan Zikri Afthar Ishak	Youth and Sports; Information and Digital; Transport; Science, Technology and Innovation	BERSATU	Tambun Tulang	8 January 2026	Incumbent

=== Ex officio members ===
Position	Office bearer
State Secretary	Noor Azman Abdul Rahman
State Legal Advisor	Yang Zaimey Yang Ghazali
State Financial Officer	Shaharuddin Sarwan

== Legislative ==
Composition of the Perlis State Legislative Assembly as of 2026. Perikatan Nasional (PN) seats Pakatan Harapan (PH) seats Vacant seats

The legislative powers in the state however, lie with the Perlis State Legislative Assembly. Its government resembles that of the other Malaysian states. The capital of the state is Kangar, where the Perlis State Government Administrative Complex is located. Government is conducted after the Westminster model.

The Legislative Assembly consists of 15 members, elected first past the post (FPTP) from single-member constituencies. The current Legislature is the 13th, since 1959. The last election was held on 19 November 2022, and currently controlled by the Perikatan Nasional coalition.

== Perlis State Government Secretariat ==
- Internal Audit Unit
- Corporate Communication Unit
- Integrity Unit

=== Development Cluster ===
- State Economic Planning Division
- District Administration Division
- Housing Division
- Local Government Division
  - Kangar Municipal Council (now Perlis Municipal Council)

=== Management Cluster ===
- Perlis State Legislative Assembly and Executive Council Division
- Functions, Protocols and Ceremonies Division
- Human Resource Management Division
- Menteri Besar Senior Private Secretary
- Perlis State Sports Council
- Information Technology Management Division
- Management Service Division
- Kota Kayang Museum

== Departments, statutory bodies and subsidiaries ==
=== Departments ===
- Office of His Royal Highness Raja of Perlis
- Office of State Legal Advisor
- Office of the State Treasury of Perlis
- Perlis State Mufti Department
- Perlis Syariah Judiciary Department
- Perlis Syariah Prosecution Department
- Perlis Public Works Department
- Perlis Lands and Mines Department
- Perlis State Irrigation and Drainage Department
- Department of Islamic Religious Affairs of Perlis
- Perlis State Veterinary Services Department
- Perlis State Agriculture Department
- Perlis State Forestry Department
- Perlis Social Welfare Department
- Perlis Town and Country Planning Department

=== Statutory bodies ===
- Perlis State Economic Development Corporation
- Perlis State Public Library Corporation
- Perlis State Islamic Foundation
- Perlis Islamic Religious and Malay Customs Council

=== Subsidiaries ===
- Perlis State Economic Development Corporation
  - Perlis Property Sdn Bhd (Cleaning)
  - Perlis Snake and Reptile Park
  - Pens Industries Sdn Bhd (Quarry)
  - Pens Holdings Sdn Bhd (Construction)
  - Rumpun Teras Sdn Bhd (Retail)
  - BakauJaya Development Sdn Bhd (Housing Development)
  - Perlis Comm Sdn Bhd (Telecommunications)
  - Perlis NCER Sdn Bhd

== See also ==
- Menteri Besar of Perlis
