= Ruzaini Rais =

Malaysian politician

- روزعيني رىٔيس

Member of the Perlis State Executive Council (Islamic Religious Affairs, Welfare, Disaster Relief, Border Relations and Cooperations)
- In office 13 June 2018 – 22 November 2022
- Monarch: Syed Sirajuddin
- Menteri Besar: Azlan Man
- Preceded by: Khairi Hasan (Islamic Religious Affairs); Rela Ahmad (Welfare)
- Succeeded by: Mohammad Azmir Azizan (Islamic Religious Affairs); Wan Badariah Wan Saad (Welfare and Disaster Relief); Izizam Ibrahim (Border Relations and Cooperations)
- Constituency: Beseri

Member of the Perlis State Legislative Assembly for Beseri
- In office 9 May 2018 – 19 November 2022
- Preceded by: Mat Rawi Kassim (BN–UMNO)
- Succeeded by: Haziq Asyraf Dun (PN–PAS)
- Majority: 416 (2018)

Personal details
- Born: Perlis, Malaysia
- Citizenship: Malaysian
- Party: United Malays National Organisation (UMNO)
- Other political affiliations: Barisan Nasional (BN)
- Occupation: Politician

Ruzaini bin Rais is a Malaysian politician who served as Member of the Perlis State Executive Council (EXCO) in the Barisan Nasional (BN) state administration under former Menteri Besar Azlan Man from June 2018 to the collapse of the BN state administration in November 2022 as well as Member of the Perlis State Legislative Assembly (MLA) for Beseri from May 2018 to November 2022. He is a member and the Division Chief of Padang Besar of the United Malays National Organisation (UMNO), a component party of the BN coalition.

== Political career ==
=== Member of the Perlis State Executive Council (2018–2022) ===
On 13 June 2018, Ruzaini was appointed as the Perlis State EXCO Member in charge of Islamic Religious Affairs, Welfare, Disaster Relief, Border Relations and Cooperations by Menteri Besar Azlan.

On 22 November 2022, Ruzaini lost his position after the BN state administration collapsed following the huge defeat of BN in the 2022 Perlis state election that wiped BN out of the assembly.

=== Member of the Perlis State Legislative Assembly (2018–2022) ===
==== 2018 Perlis state election ====
In the 2018 Perlis state election, Ruzaini made his electoral debut after being nominated by BN to contest for the Beseri state seat. He won the seat and was elected into the Perlis State Legislative Assembly as the Beseri MLA after defeating candidates of Pakatan Harapan (PH) and Gagasan Sejahtera (GS) by a majority of 416 votes.

==== 2022 Perlis state election ====
In the 2022 Perlis state election, Ruzaini was renominated by BN to defend the Beseri seat. He lost the seat and was not reelected as the Beseri MLA after losing to Haziq Asyraf Dun of Perikatan Nasional (PN) by a minority of 1,047 votes.

== Election results ==
Perlis State Legislative Assembly
| Year | Constituency | Candidate | Votes | Pct | Opponent(s) | Votes | Pct | Ballots cast | Majority | Turnout |
|---|---|---|---|---|---|---|---|---|---|---|
| 2018 | N02 Beseri | Ruzaini Rais (UMNO) | 2,879 | 41.95% | Wan Kharizal Wan Khazim (AMANAH) | 2,463 | 35.88% | 7,027 | 416 | 78.83% |
| 2018 | N02 Beseri | Ruzaini Rais (UMNO) | 2,879 | 41.95% | Azmahari Mohamood (PAS) | 1,523 | 22.18% | 7,027 | 416 | 78.83% |
| 2022 | N02 Beseri | Ruzaini Rais (UMNO) | 2,993 | 33.96% | Haziq Asyraf Dun (PAS) | 4,040 | 45.84% | 8,939 | 1,047 | 73.7% |
| 2022 | N02 Beseri | Ruzaini Rais (UMNO) | 2,993 | 33.96% | Mat Safar Saad (AMANAH) | 1,684 | 19.11% | 8,939 | 1,047 | 73.7% |
| 2022 | N02 Beseri | Ruzaini Rais (UMNO) | 2,993 | 33.96% | Mohd Shamim M Nurdin (WARISAN) | 96 | 1.09% | 8,939 | 1,047 | 73.7% |
