= Ismail Kassim =

Malaysian politician (1959–2023)

Yang Berbahagia Dato' Ismail Kassim DPMP
- إسماعيل قاسم

Member of the Perlis State Legislative Assembly for Tambun Tulang
- In office 5 May 2013 – 19 November 2022
- Preceded by: Shahidan Kassim (BN–UMNO)
- Succeeded by: Wan Zikri Afthar Ishak (PN–BERSATU)
- Majority: 2,481 (2013); 1,180 (2018)

Member of the Malaysian Parliament for Arau
- In office 8 March 2008 – 5 May 2013
- Preceded by: Syed Razlan Tuanku Syed Putra Jamalullail (BN–UMNO)
- Succeeded by: Shahidan Kassim (BN–UMNO)
- Majority: 300 (2008)

Senator Appointed by the Yang di-Pertuan Agong
- In office 1999–2005
- Monarchs: Salahuddin (1999–2001); Syed Sirajuddin (2001–2005)
- Prime Minister: Mahathir Mohamad (1999–2003); Abdullah Ahmad Badawi (2003–2005)

Faction represented in Perlis State Legislative Assembly
- 2013–2018: Barisan Nasional
- 2018–2019: Independent
- 2019–2020: Pakatan Harapan
- 2020: Malaysian United Indigenous Party
- 2020–2022: Barisan Nasional

Faction represented in Dewan Rakyat
- 2008–2013: Barisan Nasional

Faction represented in Dewan Negara
- 1999–2005: Barisan Nasional

Personal details
- Born: 2 October 1959 Tambun Tulang, Perlis, Federation of Malaya (now Malaysia)
- Died: 22 May 2023 (aged 63) Selayang, Gombak, Selangor, Malaysia
- Party: United Malays National Organisation (UMNO) (1987–2018, 2020–2023); Independent (2018–2019); Malaysian United Indigenous Party (BERSATU) (2019–2020)
- Other political affiliations: Barisan Nasional (BN) (1987–2018, 2020–2023); Pakatan Harapan (PH) (2019–2020)
- Relations: Shahidan Kassim (elder brother)
- Occupation: Politician

Ismail bin Kassim (2 October 1959 – 22 May 2023) was a Malaysian politician who had served as the Member of the Perlis State Legislative Assembly (MLA) for Tambun Tulang from May 2013 to November 2022, the Member of Parliament (MP) for Arau from March 2008 to May 2013 and a Senator from 1999 to 2005. He was a member of the United Malays National Organisation (UMNO), a component party of the Barisan Nasional (BN) coalition and briefly a member of the Malaysian United Indigenous Party (BERSATU), a component party of the formerly the Pakatan Harapan (PH) coalition. He was the younger brother of Shahidan Kassim, the current MP for Arau.

== Political career ==
Early in his political career, Ismail joined UMNO in 1987 at the age of 28.

=== Candidate for the Member of Parliament (1998) ===
==== 1998 Arau by-election ====
In the 1998 Arau by-election, Ismail made his electoral debut after being nominated by BN to contest the Arau federal seat. He lost to Hashim Jasin of the Malaysian Islamic Party (PAS) by a minority of 1,323 votes. His nomination in the by-election was marred by allegations of cronyism and nepotism arising from Shahidan who was then the Menteri Besar of Perlis. At the time, BN was bleeding support due to allegations by supporters of Anwar Ibrahim who was the political opponent of then Prime Minister Mahathir Mohamad as both fell out politically earlier in the year. Nominating Ismail as the candidate did little to rubbish the allegations. The defeat of Ismail also created history as BN lost a Perlis federal seat for the first time.

=== Senator (1999–2005) ===
In 1999, Ismail was appointed to the Parliament as Senator for the first term. In 2002, he was reappointed Senator for the second term.

=== Member of Parliament (2008–2013) ===
==== 2008 general election ====
In the 2008 general election, Ismail was renominated by BN to contest the Arau seat. He won the seat and was elected into Parliament as the Arau MP after narrowly defeating Haron Din of PAS by a majority of only 300 votes.

=== Member of the Perlis State Legislative Assembly (2013–2022) ===
==== 2013 Perlis state election ====
In the 2013 Malaysian general election, Ismail was not nominated to defend the Arau seat after exchanging seat nominations with Shahidan who was the Tambun Tulang MLA. The exchange also moved Ismail from the federal politics to the Perlis state politics and Shahidan from the Perlis state politics to the federal politics. Shahidan was renominated by BN to contest the Arau seat. Therefore, Ismail was instead nominated by BN to contest the 2013 Perlis state election for the Tambun Tulang state seat. Ismail won the seat and was elected into the Perlis State Legislative Assembly as the Tambun Tulang MLA for the first term after defeating the Azhar Ameir of Pakatan Rakyat (PR) by a majority of 2,481 votes.

==== 2018 Perlis state election and nomination as the Menteri Besar of Perlis ====
In the 2018 Perlis state election, Ismail was renominated by BN to defend the Tambun Tulang seat. He defended the seat and was reelected as the Tambun Tulang MLA for the second term after defeating the Maton Din of PH and Abu Bakar Ali of Gagasan Sejahtera (GS) by a majority of 1,180 votes. He was also nominated by BN as the Menteri Besar of Perlis after his reelection as an MLA. However, Bintong MLA, Azlan Man was reappointed to the position for the second term instead of him.

On 20 June 2018, he left UMNO. Following this, he became the first ever independent Perlis MLA in the history of the state. On 7 July 2018, he applied to join the People's Justice Party (PKR), a component party of the PH coalition. However, the membership application was never approved. On 4 August 2019, Ismail joined BERSATU which was another PH component party. On 16 May 2020, he left BERSATU and rejoined UMNO.

==== 2022 Perlis state election ====
In the 2022 Perlis state election, Ismail was renominated by BN to defend the Tambun Tulang seat again. He lost the seat and was not reelected as the Tambun Tulang MLA for the third term after losing to Wan Zikri Afthar Ishak of PN by a minority of 2,485 votes.

== Death ==
On 22 May 2023, Ismail died of a heart attack at the Selayang Hospital in Selayang, Gombak, Selangor, at the age of 63.

== Election results ==
Parliament of Malaysia
Year	Constituency	Candidate	Votes	Pct	Opponent(s)	Votes	Pct	Ballots cast	Majority	Turnout
1998	P003 Arau	Ismail Kassim (UMNO)	11,541	47.29%	Hashim Jasin (PAS)	12,864	52.71%	24,749	1,323	70.27%
2008	P003 Arau	Ismail Kassim (UMNO)	16,451	50.32%	Haron Din (PAS)	16,151	49.41%	33,276	300	83.45%

Perlis State Legislative Assembly
Year	Constituency	Candidate	Votes	Pct	Opponent(s)	Votes	Pct	Ballots cast	Majority	Turnout
2013	N12 Tambun Tulang	Ismail Kassim (UMNO)	5,286	65.20%	Azhar Ameir (PKR)	2,805	34.60%	8,260	2,481	87.65%
2018	N12 Tambun Tulang	Ismail Kassim (UMNO)	4,005	38.00%	Maton Din (PKR)	2,825	26.80%	8,915	1,180	84.62%
2018	N12 Tambun Tulang	Ismail Kassim (UMNO)	4,005	38.00%	Abu Bakar Ali (PAS)	1,910	18.10%	8,915	1,180	84.62%
2022	N12 Tambun Tulang	Ismail Kassim (UMNO)	2,971	29.23%	Wan Zikri Afthar Ishak (BERSATU)	5,456	53.68%	10,163	2,485	75.56%
2022	N12 Tambun Tulang	Ismail Kassim (UMNO)	2,971	29.23%	Muhammad Syahmi Suhaimi (PKR)	1,554	15.29%	10,163	2,485	75.56%
2022	N12 Tambun Tulang	Ismail Kassim (UMNO)	2,971	29.23%	Maton Din (PEJUANG)	182	1.79%	10,163	2,485	75.56%

== Honours ==
- Perlis
  - Knight Commander of the Order of the Crown of Perlis (DPMP) – Dato' (2007)
