= Arau (federal constituency) =

Malaysian Perlis federal constituency

Arau (P003)
Perlis constituency

Federal constituency
- Legislature: Dewan Rakyat
- MP: Shahidan Kassim; PN
- Constituency created: 1974
- First contested: 1974
- Last contested: 2022

Demographics
- Population (2020): 97,332
- Electors (2022): 60,876
- Area (km²): 222
- Pop. density (per km²): 438.4

Arau is a federal constituency in Perlis, Malaysia, that has been represented in the Dewan Rakyat since 1974.

The federal constituency was created in the 1974 redistribution and is mandated to return a single member to the Dewan Rakyat under the first past the post voting system.

== Demographics ==
Ethnic breakdown of Arau's electorate as of 2022
1. Malay (92.6%)
2. Chinese (4.00%)
3. Other ethnicities (2.30%)
4. Indian (1.10%)
Age breakdown of Arau's electorate as of 2022
1. 18-20 (5.98%)
2. 21-29 (20.3%)
3. 30-39 (21.9%)
4. 40-49 (16.9%)
5. 50-59 (15.1%)
6. 60-69 (11.4%)
7. 70-79 (5.95%)
8. 80-89 (2.11%)
9. above 90 (0.33%)
Gender breakdown of Arau's electorate as of 2022
1. Male (48.8%)
2. Female (51.2%)

== History ==
=== Polling districts ===
According to the federal gazette issued on 31 October 2022, the Arau constituency is divided into 30 polling districts.

State constituency	Polling Districts	Code	Location
Pauh (N11)	Guar Gajah	003/11/01	SMK Dato' Sheikh Ahmad; SMA Arau
Pauh (N11)	Padang Siding	003/11/02	SK Pauh
Pauh (N11)	Pauh	003/11/03	SMK Tengku Budriah
Pauh (N11)	Istana	003/11/04	SK Tengku Budriah
Pauh (N11)	Pekan Arau	003/11/05	SJK (C) Hwa Aik
Pauh (N11)	Kubang Paya	003/11/06	SJK (C) Sin Min
Tambun Tulang (N12)	Kubang Gajah	003/12/01	SK Kubang Gajah
Tambun Tulang (N12)	Jejawi	003/12/02	SMK Syed Sirajuddin
Tambun Tulang (N12)	Kampong Banat	003/12/03	SMK Syed Hussien
Tambun Tulang (N12)	Kampong Surau	003/12/04	SK Utan Aji
Tambun Tulang (N12)	Mengkuang Layar	003/12/05	SK Long Boh
Tambun Tulang (N12)	Tambun Tulang	003/12/06	SK Tambun Tulang
Guar Sanji (N13)	Guar Sanji	003/13/01	SK Arau
Guar Sanji (N13)	Kampong Sena	003/13/02	SK Jelempok
Guar Sanji (N13)	Behor Mentalon	003/13/03	SMK Syed Ahmad
Guar Sanji (N13)	Chemumar	003/13/04	SK Raja Perempuan Budriah
Guar Sanji (N13)	Serdang	003/18/05	SK Kampong Serdang
Guar Sanji (N13)	Changkat Jawi	003/13/06	SK Changkat Jawi
Simpang Empat (N14)	Sungai Berembang	003/14/01	SK Sungai Berembang
Simpang Empat (N14)	Behor Mali	003/14/02	SK Bohor Mali
Simpang Empat (N14)	Sungai Bahru	003/14/03	SK Sungai Baru
Simpang Empat (N14)	Simpang Empat Che Kassim	003/14/04	SK Simpang Ampat
Simpang Empat (N14)	Lat Seribu	003/14/05	SJK (C) Simpang Ampat
Sanglang (N15)	Bongor Kudong	003/15/01	Dewan 1 Malaysia Simpang Empat
Sanglang (N15)	Bunga Mas	003/15/02	SMK Syed Saffi
Sanglang (N15)	Sungai Padang	003/15/03	SK Dato Ahmad Musa
Sanglang (N15)	Simpang Sanglang	003/15/04	SK Sanglang
Sanglang (N15)	Padang Keria	003/15/05	SK Padang Keria
Sanglang (N15)	Kuala Sanglang	003/15/06	SJK (C) Chin Hun
Sanglang (N15)	Tok Pulau	003/15/07	SMK Sanglang

=== Representation history ===
Members of Parliament for Arau
Parliament	No	Years	Member	Party	Vote Share
Constituency created from Perlis Selatan and Perlis Utara
4th	P002	1974–1978	Syed Hassan Syed Mohamed (سيد حسن سيد محمد)	BN (UMNO)	14,789; 70.58%
5th	P002	1978–1982	Syed Hassan Syed Mohamed (سيد حسن سيد محمد)	BN (UMNO)	13,150; 54.16%
6th	P002	1982–1986	Abdul Hamid Pawanteh (عبدالحميد ڤاوانتيه)	BN (UMNO)	17,464; 63.60%
7th	P002	1986–1990	Shahidan Kassim (شهيدان كسسيم)	BN (UMNO)	18,156; 62.08%
8th	P002	1990–1995	Shahidan Kassim (شهيدان كسسيم)	BN (UMNO)	20,948; 61.43%
9th	P003	1995–1998	Kamarudin Ahmad (كامرودين احمد)	BN (UMNO)	16,266; 63.53%
9th	P003	1998–1999	Hashim Jasin (هشيم جاسين)	PAS	12,864; 52.71%
10th	P003	1999–2004	Mastika Junaidah Husin (مستيكا جنيده حسين)	BN (UMNO)	15,297; 52.73%
11th	P003	2004–2008	Syed Razlan Syed Putra Jamallullail (سيد رزلن سيد ڤوترا جماللوللايل)	BN (UMNO)	17,367; 55.15%
12th	P003	2008–2013	Ismail Kassim (اسماعيل كسسيم)	BN (UMNO)	16,451; 50.46%
13th	P003	2013–2018	Shahidan Kassim (شهيدان كسسيم)	BN (UMNO)	19,376; 51.28%
14th	P003	2018–2022	Shahidan Kassim (شهيدان كسسيم)	BN (UMNO)	16,547; 41.79%
15th	P003	2022–present	Shahidan Kassim (شهيدان كسسيم)	PN (PAS)	31,458; 67.23%

=== State constituency ===
Parliamentary constituency	State constituency						
Parliamentary constituency	1955–1959*	1959–1974	1974–1986	1986–1995	1995–2004	2004–2018	2018–present
Arau			Bandar Arau				
Arau				Guar Sanji			
Arau			Kayang				
Arau				Kota Raja			
Arau			Kuala Perlis				
Arau			Kurong Anai				
Arau					Pauh		
Arau			Sanglang				
Arau					Simpang Empat		
Arau					Tambun Tulang		
Arau			Utan Aji				

=== Historical boundaries ===
State Constituency	Area				
State Constituency	1974	1984	1994	2003	2018
Bandar Arau	Arau; Kampung Banat; Kampung Hutan Kandis; Padang Nyu; Tambun Tulang				
Guar Sanji		Changkat Jawi; Guar Sanji; Kampung Hutan Kandis; Kampung Serdang; Kampung Chermai		Changkat Jawi; Guar Sanji; Kampung Sena; Kampung Serdang; Kampung Chermai	
Kayang	Kampung Titi Serong; Kampung Kenangan; Kampung Tanjung Gelam; Kayang; Simpang Empat	Kampung Titi Serong; Kampung Kenangan; Kayang; Simpang Empat; Sungai Berembang			
Kota Raja		Kampung Alor Redis; Kampung Banat; Kampung Kubang Gajah; Jejawi; Tambun Tulang			
Kuala Perlis	Kuala Perak; Kuala Perlis; Kurong Batang; Sungai Berembang; Taman Seri Bayu	Kuala Perak; Kuala Perlis; Kurong Batang; Taman Semarak; Taman Seri Bayu			
Kurong Anai	Kampung Chermai; Kampung Guring Bawah; Kampung Jelempok; Kurong Anai; Pauh	Kampung Chermai; Kampung Guring Bawah; Kampung Jelempok; Kampung Sena; Kurong Anai			
Pauh			Arau; Kubang Paya; Padang Nyu; Padang Siding; Pauh		
Sanglang	Bongor Kudong; Kampung Kepala Batas Pauh; Kuala Sanglang; Padang Keria; Sungai Padang				
Simpang Empat			Bohor Mali; Kampung Kenangan; Simpang Empat; Sungai Bahru; Sungai Berembang		
Tambun Tulang			Kampung Alor Redis; Kampung Banat; Kampung Kubang Gajah; Tambun Tulang; Utan Aji		Jejawi; Kampung Alor Redis; Kampung Banat; Kampung Kubang Gajah; Utan Aji
Utan Aji	Gunung Medan; Jejawi; Kampung Kubang Gajah; Kampung Sentang; Utan Aji	Gunung Medan; Kampung Behor Mali; Kampung Mengkuang Layar; Kampung Sentang; Utan Aji			

=== Current state assembly members ===
No.	State Constituency	Member	Coalition (Party)
N11	Pauh	Megat Hashirat Hassan	PN (BERSATU)
N12	Tambun Tulang	Wan Zikri Afthar Ishak	PN (BERSATU)
N13	Guar Sanji	Vacant	
N14	Simpang Empat	Razali Saad	PN (PAS)
N15	Sanglang	Mohd. Shukri Ramli	PN (PAS)

=== Local governments & postcodes ===
No.	Local Government	Postcode
P003	Kangar Municipal Council	02500 Kangar; 02600 Arau; 02700, 02800 Simpang Ampat

== Election results ==
Malaysian general election, 2022
Party	Candidate	Votes	%	∆%
PN	Shahidan Kassim	31,458	67.23	▲67.23
BN	Rozabil Abd Rahman	8,242	17.62	▼24.17
PH	Fathin Amelina Fazlie	7,089	15.15	▲15.15
Total valid votes		46,789	100.00	
Total rejected ballots		727		
Unreturned ballots		88		
Turnout		47,604	76.86	▼7.05
Registered electors		60,876		
Majority		23,216	49.61	▲37.34
PN gain from BN		Swing		?
Source(s) https://lom.agc.gov.my/ilims/upload/portal/akta/outputp/1753257/PUB605.pdf

Malaysian general election, 2018
Party	Candidate	Votes	%	∆%
BN	Shahidan Kassim	16,547	41.79	▼9.49
PKR	Abd Rahman Daud	11,691	29.52	▲29.52
PAS	Hashim Jasin	11,362	28.69	▼18.96
Total valid votes		39,600	100.00	
Total rejected ballots		690		
Unreturned ballots		143		
Turnout		40,433	83.91	▼3.70
Registered electors		48,187		
Majority		4,856	12.27	▲8.64
BN hold		Swing		
Source(s) "His Majesty's Government Gazette - Notice of Contested Election, Parliament for the State of Perlis [P.U. (B) 232/2018]" (PDF). Attorney General's Chambers of Malaysia. 3 May 2018. "Federal Government Gazette - Results of Contested Election and Statements of the Poll after the Official Addition of Votes, Parliamentary Constituencies for the State of Perlis [P.U. (B) 306/2018]" (PDF). Attorney General's Chambers of Malaysia. 28 May 2018.

Malaysian general election, 2013
Party	Candidate	Votes	%	∆%
BN	Shahidan Kassim	19,376	51.28	▲0.82
PAS	Haron Din	18,005	47.65	▼1.89
Independent	Zainudin Yom	406	1.08	▲1.08
Total valid votes		37,787	100.00	
Total rejected ballots		525		
Unreturned ballots		127		
Turnout		38,439	87.61	▲4.16
Registered electors		43,876		
Majority		1,371	3.63	▲2.71
BN hold		Swing		
Source(s) "Federal Government Gazette - Notice of Contested Election, Parliament for the State of Perlis [P.U. (B) 169/2013]" (PDF). Attorney General's Chambers of Malaysia. 26 April 2013. Archived from the original (PDF) on 2019-12-29. "Federal Government Gazette - Results of Contested Election and Statements of the Poll after the Official Addition of Votes, Parliamentary Constituencies for the State of Perlis [P.U. (B) 210/2013]" (PDF). Attorney General's Chambers of Malaysia. 22 May 2013.

Malaysian general election, 2008
Party	Candidate	Votes	%	∆%
BN	Ismail Kassim	16,451	50.46	▼4.69
PAS	Haron Din	16,151	49.54	▲4.69
Total valid votes		32,602	100.00	
Total rejected ballots		586		
Unreturned ballots		88		
Turnout		33,276	83.45	▼0.78
Registered electors		39,877		
Majority		300	0.92	▼9.38
BN hold		Swing		

Malaysian general election, 2004
Party	Candidate	Votes	%	∆%
BN	Syed Razlan Syed Putra Jamallullail	17,367	55.15	▲2.42
PAS	Haron Din	14,124	44.85	▼2.42
Total valid votes		31,491	100.00	
Total rejected ballots		533		
Unreturned ballots		38		
Turnout		32,062	84.23	▲2.44
Registered electors		38,064		
Majority		3,243	10.30	▲4.84
BN hold		Swing		

Malaysian general election, 1999
Party	Candidate	Votes	%	∆%
BN	Mastika Junaidah Husin	15,297	52.73	▲5.44
PAS	Abd. Aziz Hanafi	13,711	47.27	▼5.44
Total valid votes		29,008	100.00	
Total rejected ballots		414		
Unreturned ballots		51		
Turnout		29,473	81.79	▲11.52
Registered electors		36,034		
Majority		1,586	5.46	▲0.04
BN gain from PAS		Swing		?

Malaysian general by-election, 4 July 1998 Upon the death of incumbent, Kamarudin Ahmad
Party	Candidate	Votes	%	∆%
PAS	Hashim Jasin	12,864	52.71	▲52.71
BN	Ismail Kassim	11,541	47.29	▼16.24
Total valid votes		24,405	100.00	
Total rejected ballots		344		
Unreturned ballots		0		
Turnout		24,749	70.27	▼6.24
Registered electors		35,221		
Majority		1,323	5.42	▼21.64
PAS gain from BN		Swing		?

Malaysian general election, 1995
Party	Candidate	Votes	%	∆%
BN	Kamarudin Ahmad	16,266	63.53	▲2.10
S46	Saad @ Md. Zain Hamzah	9,337	36.47	▲36.47
Total valid votes		25,603	100.00	
Total rejected ballots		891		
Unreturned ballots		30		
Turnout		26,524	76.51	▼0.91
Registered electors		34,667		
Majority		6,929	27.06	▲4.20
BN hold		Swing		

Malaysian general election, 1990
Party	Candidate	Votes	%	∆%
BN	Shahidan Kassim	20,948	61.43	▼0.65
PAS	Khalid Abdul Samad	13,154	38.57	▲0.65
Total valid votes		34,102	100.00	
Total rejected ballots		1,094		
Unreturned ballots		0		
Turnout		35,196	77.42	▲2.81
Registered electors		45,461		
Majority		7,794	22.86	▼1.30
BN hold		Swing		

Malaysian general election, 1986
Party	Candidate	Votes	%	∆%
BN	Shahidan Kassim	18,156	62.08	▼1.52
PAS	Tengku Abdul Rahman Tengku Ismail	11,091	37.92	▲1.52
Total valid votes		29,247	100.00	
Total rejected ballots		830		
Unreturned ballots			0	
Turnout		30,077	74.61	▼2.24
Registered electors		40,312		
Majority		7,065	24.16	▼3.04
BN hold		Swing		

Malaysian general election, 1982
Party	Candidate	Votes	%	∆%
BN	Abdul Hamid Pawanteh	17,464	63.60	▲9.44
PAS	Mahamood Mohamad Noor	9,994	36.40	▲2.53
Total valid votes		27,458	100.00	
Total rejected ballots		1,004		
Unreturned ballots		0		
Turnout		28,462	76.85	▼0.93
Registered electors		37,035		
Majority		7,470	27.20	▲6.91
BN hold		Swing		

Malaysian general election, 1978
Party	Candidate	Votes	%	∆%
BN	Syed Hassan Syed Mohamed	13,150	54.16	▼16.42
PAS	Mahamood Mohamad Noor	8,223	33.87	▲33.87
Independent	Hussain Abdul Rahman	2,906	11.97	▲11.97
Total valid votes		24,279	100.00	
Total rejected ballots		1,347		
Unreturned ballots		0		
Turnout		25,626	77.78	▲0.21
Registered electors		32,947		
Majority		4,927	20.29	▼20.87
BN hold		Swing		

Malaysian general election, 1974
Party	Candidate	Votes	%
BN	Syed Hassan Syed Mohamed	14,789	70.58
Independent	Idrus @ Darus Omar	6,164	29.42
Total valid votes		20,953	100.00
Total rejected ballots		1,512	
Unreturned ballots		0	
Turnout		22,465	77.57
Registered electors		28,961	
Majority		8,625	41.16
This was a new constituency created.
