= Fakhrul Anwar Ismail =

Malaysian politician and businessman

Yang Berhormat Tuan Fakhrul Anwar Ismail MLA
- فَخْرُٱلْأَنْوار إِسْمَاعِيل

Member of the Perlis State Executive Council (Housing, Local Government, Small Hawkers and Businessmen, Domestic Trade, Cooperatives, Consumerism, Entrepreneur Development, Small and Medium Industries)
- In office 25 November 2022 – 16 November 2023
- Monarch: Sirajuddin
- Menteri Besar: Mohd Shukri Ramli
- Preceded by: Azizan Sulaiman
- Succeeded by: Wan Zikri Afthar Ishak
- Constituency: Bintong

Member of the Perlis State Legislative Assembly for Bintong
- Incumbent
- Assumed office 19 November 2022
- Preceded by: Azlan Man (BN–UMNO)
- Majority: 4,329 (2022)

Faction represented in Perlis State Legislative Assembly
- 2022–: Perikatan Nasional

Personal details
- Born: Fakhrul Anwar bin Ismail; 10 November 1971 (age 54) Alor Setar, Kedah, Malaysia
- Citizenship: Malaysian
- Party: Malaysian Islamic Party (PAS)
- Other political affiliations: Perikatan Nasional (PN)
- Spouse: Noraishah Mat Yusoh
- Children: 6
- Education: SK Hutan Kampung; SMK Kepala Batas; MRSM Beseri
- Alma mater: Malaya University Foundation Centre; MARA Technology University (Dip); Ilham College of Technology (Dip)
- Occupation: Politician
- Profession: Businessman

Fakhrul Anwar Ismail (born 10 November 1971) is a Malaysian politician and businessman who has served as Member of the Perlis State Legislative Assembly (MLA) for Bintong since November 2022. He served as Member of the Perlis State Executive Council (EXCO) in the Perikatan Nasional (PN) state administration under Menteri Besar Mohd Shukri Ramli from November 2022 to his removal from office in November 2023. He is a member of the Malaysian Islamic Party (PAS), a component party of the PN coalition. He is the Division Information Chief of PAS of Kangar, Member of the State Committee of PAS of Perlis and State Youth Secretary of PAS of Perlis.

== Personal life ==
Fakhrul Anwar was born in Alor Setar, Kedah, Malaysia on 10 November 1971. He is also married to Noraishah Mat Yusoh and has six children with her.

== Political career ==
=== Member of the Perlis State Executive Council (2022–2023) ===
In the 2022 Perlis state election, the ruling Barisan Nasional (BN) suffered from huge defeat and wipeout in the assembly as none of its candidates won a state seat in the elections after losing all the 10 seats it previously held to PN. The elections ended 63-year rule of BN in the state, saw the first ever transition of power in the history of the state and replaced BN with PN as the ruling coalition and dominant political force in the state as PN won 14 out of 15 state seats and therefore two-thirds supermajority of the assembly. Therefore, State Chairman of PN of Perlis, State Commissioner of PAS of Perlis and Sanglang MLA Mohd Shukri replaced Azlan Man as the new and 10th Menteri Besar of Perlis and formed a new PN state administration on 22 November 2022. On 25 November 2022, Fakhrul Anwar was appointed as the Perlis State EXCO Member in charge of Housing, Local Government, Small Hawkers and Businessmen, Domestic Trade, Cooperatives, Consumerism, Entrepreneur Development, Small and Medium Industries by Menteri Besar, Mohd Shukri. On 16 November 2023, the Perlis EXCO was reshuffled, Fakhrul Anwar was removed from office by Menteri Besar Mohd Shukri and taken over by Wan Zikri Afthar Ishak during the reshuffle.

=== Member of the Perlis State Legislative Assembly (since 2022) ===
==== 2018 Perlis state election ====
In the 2018 Perlis state election, Fakhrul Anwar made his electoral debut after being nominated by Gagasan Sejahtera (GS) to contest for the Sena state seat. He was not elected as the Sena MLA after losing to Asrul Nizan Abdul Jalil of Pakatan Harapan (PH) by a minority of 2,288 votes.

==== 2022 Perlis state election ====
In the 2022 state election, Fakhrul Anwar was nominated by PN to contest for the Bintong seat. He won the seat and was elected into the Perlis State Legislative Assembly as the Bintong MLA after defeating Menteri Besar and defending MLA Azlan Man of BN, Azhari Ahmad of Pakatan Harapan (PH), Shazwan Suban of the Homeland Fighters Party (PEJUANG), independent candidate Hashim Suboh and Mohamad Khair Mohd Noor of the Heritage Party (WARISAN) by the majority of 4,329 votes.

== Other careers ==
Besides his political positions, Fakhrul Anwar is also the Senior Assistant for Administration of the Madrasah Diniah Islamiah and Headmaster of the Al-Furqan Islamic Primary School. Both institutions are located in Arau, Perlis. In addition, he is also Director of the Action Committee of Sena, Director of the Perlis Charity Unit, Member of the Board of Directors of Malaysia Perlis Charity Organisation, Ummah Centre Service and Guidance Center Manager, Head of Kampung Madi Village, Member of the Kampung Madi Islamic Center Committee, Member of the Board of Directors of Al-Furqan Berhad Cooperative.

== Election results ==
Perlis State Legislative Assembly
| Year | Constituency | Candidate | Votes | Pct | Opponent(s) | Votes | Pct | Ballots cast | Majority | Turnout |
|---|---|---|---|---|---|---|---|---|---|---|
| 2018 | N07 Sena | Fakhrul Anwar Ismail (PAS) | 1,888 | 19.02% | Asrul Nizan Abd Jalil (PKR) | 4,177 | 42.07% | 9,928 | 314 | 82.20% |
| 2018 | N07 Sena | Fakhrul Anwar Ismail (PAS) | 1,888 | 19.02% | Azihani Ali (UMNO) | 3,863 | 38.91% | 9,928 | 314 | 82.20% |
| 2022 | N06 Bintong | Fakhrul Anwar Ismail (PAS) | 7,325 | 44.76% | Azlan Man (UMNO) | 2,996 | 18,31% | 12,721 | 4,329 | 79.00% |
| 2022 | N06 Bintong | Fakhrul Anwar Ismail (PAS) | 7,325 | 44.76% | Azhari Ahmad (AMANAH) | 2,029 | 12.40% | 12,721 | 4,329 | 79.00% |
| 2022 | N06 Bintong | Fakhrul Anwar Ismail (PAS) | 7,325 | 44.76% | Shazwan Suban (PEJUANG) | 157 | 1.00% | 12,721 | 4,329 | 79.00% |
| 2022 | N06 Bintong | Fakhrul Anwar Ismail (PAS) | 7,325 | 44.76% | Hashim Suboh (IND) | 157 | 1.00% | 12,721 | 4,329 | 79.00% |
| 2022 | N06 Bintong | Fakhrul Anwar Ismail (PAS) | 7,325 | 44.76% | Mohamad Khair Mohd Noor (WARISAN) | 57 | 0.35% | 12,721 | 4,329 | 79.00% |

== Honours ==
- Perlis
  - Recipient of Tuanku Syed Sirajuddin Jamalullail Silver Jubilee Medal (2025)
