= Wan Zikri Afthar Ishak =

Malaysian politician

Yang Berhormat Tuan Wan Zikri Afthar Ishak MLA
- وان ذكري أفطر إسحاق

Member of the Perlis State Executive Council (Youth and Sports, Hawker and Small Traders, Entrepreneur Development, Small and Medium Industries, Development of New Growth Centre & Creative Economy)
- In office 16 November 2023 – 24 November 2024
- Monarch: Syed Sirajuddin
- Menteri Besar: Mohd Shukri Ramli
- Preceded by: Fakhrul Anwar Ismail
- Constituency: Tambun Tulang

Member of the Perlis State Legislative Assembly for Tambun Tulang
- Incumbent
- Assumed office 19 November 2022
- Preceded by: Ismail Kassim (BN–UMNO)
- Majority: 2,485 (2022)

Faction represented in the Perlis State Legislative Assembly
- 2022–: Perikatan Nasional

Personal details
- Born: Wan Zikri Afthar bin Ishak Malaysia
- Citizenship: Malaysia
- Party: Malaysian United Indigenous Party (BERSATU)
- Other political affiliations: Perikatan Nasional (PN)
- Occupation: Politician

Wan Zikri Afthar Ishak is a Malaysian politician who has served as Member of the Perlis State Executive Council (EXCO) in the Perikatan Nasional (PN) state administration under Menteri Besar Mohd Shukri Ramli from November 2023 to November 2024 and Member of the Perlis State Legislative Assembly (MLA) for Tambun Tulang since November 2022. He is a member and Youth Information Chief of Perlis of the Malaysian United Indigenous Party (BERSATU), a component party of the PN coalition.

== Political career ==
=== Member of the Perlis State Executive Council (since 2023) ===
In the 2022 Perlis state election, the ruling Barisan Nasional (BN) suffered from huge defeat and wipeout in the assembly as none of its candidates won a state seat in the elections after losing all the 10 seats it previously held to PN. The elections ended 63-year rule of BN in the state, saw the first ever transition of power in the history of the state and replaced BN with PN as the ruling coalition and dominant political force in the state as PN won 14 out of 15 state seats and therefore two-thirds supermajority of the assembly. Therefore, State Chairman of PN of Perlis, State Commissioner of PAS of Perlis and Sanglang MLA Mohd Shukri replaced Azlan Man as the new and 10th Menteri Besar of Perlis and formed a new PN state administration on 22 November 2022. On 16 November 2023, the Perlis EXCO was reshuffled, Wan Zikri Afthar was appointed as the Perlis State EXCO Member in charge of Youth and Sports, Hawker and Small Traders, Entrepreneur Development, Small and Medium Industries, Development of New Growth Centre and Creative Economy to replace Fakhrul Anwar Ismail who was removed from office during the reshuffle by Menteri Besar Mohd Shukri.

=== Member of the Perlis State Legislative Assembly (since 2022) ===
==== 2022 Perlis state election ====
In the 2022 state election, Wan Zikri Afthar was nominated by PN to contest for the Tambun Tulang seat. He won the seat and was elected into the Perlis State Legislative Assembly as the Tambun Tulang MLA after defeating defending MLA Ismail Kassim of BN, Muhammad Syahmi Suhaimi of Pakatan Harapan (PH) and Maton Din of the Homeland Fighters Party (PEJUANG) by the majority of 2,485 votes.

== Election results ==
Perlis State Legislative Assembly
Year	Constituency	Candidate	Votes	Pct	Opponent(s)	Votes	Pct	Ballots cast	Majority	Turnout
2022	N12 Tambun Tulang	Wan Zikri Afthar Ishak (BERSATU)	5,456	53.68%	Ismail Kassim (UMNO)	2,971	29.23%	10,163	2,485	75.56%
2022	N12 Tambun Tulang	Wan Zikri Afthar Ishak (BERSATU)	5,456	53.68%	Muhammad Syahmi Suhaimi (PKR)	1,554	15.29%	10,163	2,485	75.56%
2022	N12 Tambun Tulang	Wan Zikri Afthar Ishak (BERSATU)	5,456	53.68%	Maton Din (PEJUANG)	182	1.79%	10,163	2,485	75.56%

== Honours ==
- Perlis
  - Recipient of Tuanku Syed Sirajuddin Jamalullail Silver Jubilee Medal (2025)
