= 2018 Perlis state election =

Malaysian state election

- 9 May 2018

All 15 seats in the Perlis State Legislative Assembly 8 seats needed for a majority
- Registered: 150,221
- Turnout: 123,036 (85.91%)
	Majority party	Minority party	Third party
	BN	PH	GS
Leader	Azlan Man	Ameir Hassan	Mohd Shukri Ramli
Party	Barisan Nasional (UMNO)	Pakatan Harapan (Bersatu)	Gagasan Sejahtera (PAS)
Leader since	2013	30 August 2017	2013
Leader's seat	Bintong	Pauh (lost seat)	Sanglang
Last election	13 seats, 55.37%	1 seat, 18.10% (Pakatan Rakyat)	1 seat, 23.71% (Pakatan Rakyat)
Seats before	13	1	1
Seats won	10	3	2
Seat change	▼3	▲2	▲1
Popular vote	47,151	42,220	31,335
Percentage	39.02%	34.94%	25.93%
Swing	▼16.35%	▲16.84%	▲2.22%
Menteri Besar before election
Azlan Man
BN
Elected Menteri Besar
Azlan Man
BN

The 14th Perlis State election was held on 9 May 2018. The previous state election was held on 5 May 2013. The state assemblymen is elected to 5 years term each.

The Perlis State Legislative Assembly would automatically dissolve on 28 June 2018, the fifth anniversary of the first sitting, and elections must be held within sixty days (two months) of the dissolution (on or before 28 August 2018, with the date to be decided by the Election Commission), unless dissolved prior to that date by the Head of State (King of Perlis) on the advice of the Head of Government (Menteri Besar of Perlis).

The incumbent party Barisan Nasional won a simple majority of 10 seats and was able to form a government. The opposition Pakatan Harapan won 3 seats while Gagasan Sejahtera won 2 seats.

== Background ==
=== Electoral system ===
Each state constituencies of Perlis will elect one member to the Perlis State Legislative Assembly using the first-past-the-post voting system. If one party obtains a majority of seats, then that party is entitled to form the State Government, with its leader as Menteri Besar. If the election results in no single party having a majority, there is a hung assembly, of which will be dissolved under the royal prerogative of the Raja.

The redistricting of electoral boundaries for the entire country had been presented to and passed by the Dewan Rakyat, and subsequently gazetted on 29 March 2018 after obtaining the royal consent of the Yang di-Pertuan Agong ahead of the 14th general election. Elections are conducted by the Election Commission of Malaysia (EC), which is under the jurisdiction of the Prime Minister's Department.

=== Voting Eligibility ===
To vote in the state election, one had to be:

- registered in the electoral roll as an elector in the constituency in which he resides on;
- aged 21 or over on the registration date;
- a resident of the constituency, or if not so, an absentee voter;
- not disqualified under any law relating to offences committed in connection with elections.

== Contenders ==
Barisan Nasional (BN) contested in all 15 seats in Perlis State Legislative Assembly. Barisan Nasional (BN) linchpin party United Malays National Organisation (UNMO) contested in 13 seats and Malaysian Chinese Association(MCA) contested in 2 seats.

Pakatan Harapan contested in all 15 seats in Perlis.

Pan-Malaysian Islamic Party (PAS) also contested in all 15 seats.

=== Political parties ===
Coalition
Incumbent	Opposition	
Barisan Nasional (BN)	Gagasan Sejahtera (GS)	Pakatan Harapan (PH)
United Malays National Organisation (UMNO); Malaysian Chinese Association (MCA)	Malaysian Islamic Party (PAS)	Malaysian United Indigenous Party (Bersatu); People's Justice Party (PKR); National Trust Party (Amanah); Democratic Action Party (DAP)

== The contested seats ==
No.	State constituency	Incumbent State Assemblyman	Political parties							
No.	State constituency	Incumbent State Assemblyman	Barisan Nasional		Gagasan Sejahtera		Pakatan Harapan		Other parties/Ind	
No.	State constituency	Incumbent State Assemblyman	Candidate Name	Party	Candidate Name	Party	Candidate Name	Party	Candidate Name	Party
N01	Titi Tinggi	Khaw Hock Kong (BN)	Teh Chai Aan	MCA	Kamis Yub	PAS	Teh Seng Chuan	DAP	Yaacob Man	IND
N02	Beseri	Mat Rawi Kassim (BN)	Ruzaini Rais	UMNO	Azamhari Mohamood	PAS	Wan Kharizal Wan Khazim	Amanah	—N/a	—N/a
N03	Chuping	Asmaiza Ahmad (BN)	Asmaiza Ahmad	UMNO	Mohd. Ali Puteh	PAS	Poziyah Hamzah	PKR	—N/a	—N/a
N04	Mata Ayer	Khairi Hasan (BN)	Siti Berenee Yahaya	UMNO	Mohammad Yahya	PAS	Azhar Omar	Bersatu	—N/a	—N/a
N05	Santan	Sabry Ahmad (BN)	Azizan Sulaiman	UMNO	Baharuddin Ahmad	PAS	Che Mazlina Che Yob	Amanah	—N/a	—N/a
N06	Bintong	Rela Ahmad (BN)	Azlan Man	UMNO	Abd. Jamil Kamis	PAS	Mokhtar Che Kassim	Amanah	—N/a	—N/a
N07	Sena	Abdul Jamil Saad (BN)	Azihani Ali	UMNO	Fakhrul Anwar Ismail	PAS	Asrul Nizan Abd Jalil	PKR	—N/a	—N/a
N08	Indera Kayangan	Chan Ming Kai (PH)	Chuah Tian Hee	MCA	Wan Hassan Wan Ismail	PAS	Gan Ay Ling	PKR	—N/a	—N/a
N09	Kuala Perlis	Mat Hassan (BN)	Azam Rashid	UMNO	Mohamad Fuat Abu Bakar	PAS	Nor Azam Karap	PKR	—N/a	—N/a
N10	Kayang	Ahmad Bakri Ali (BN)	Hamizan Hassan	UMNO	Md Radzi Hassan	PAS	Abdul Hannaan Khairy	Bersatu	—N/a	—N/a
N11	Pauh	Azlan Man (BN)	Rozieana Ahmad	UMNO	Idris Yaacob	PAS	Ameir Hassan	Bersatu	—N/a	—N/a
N12	Tambun Tulang	Ismail Kassim (BN)	Ismail Kassim	UMNO	Abu Bakar Ali	PAS	Maton Din	Bersatu	—N/a	—N/a
N13	Guar Sanji	Jafperi Othman (BN)	Afifi Osman	UMNO	Mohd Ridzuan Hashim	PAS	Baridah Che Nayan	Bersatu	—N/a	—N/a
N14	Simpang Empat	Nurulhisham Yaakob (BN)	Nurulhisham Yaakob	UMNO	Rus'sele Eizan	PAS	Wan Noralhakim Shaghir Saad	PKR	—N/a	—N/a
N15	Sanglang	Mohd Shukri Ramli (GS)	Zaidi Saidin	UMNO	Mohd. Shukri Ramli	PAS	Zolkharnain Abidin	Amanah	—N/a	—N/a

== Election pendulum ==
The 14th General Election witnessed 10 governmental seats and 5 nongovernmental seats filled the Perlis State Legislative Assembly. However, none of the government side has safe and fairly safe seat, while the non-government side has just 1 fairly safe seat.

2018 Perlis state election

GOVERNMENT SEATS
Marginal
Titi Tinggi	Teh Chai Aan	MCA	35.39
Simpang Empat	Nurulhisham Yaakob	UMNO	36.46
Pauh	Rozieana Ahmad	UMNO	39.29
Bintong	Azlan Man	UMNO	40.59
Kayang	Hamizan Hassan	UMNO	41.09
Beseri	Ruzaini Rais	UMNO	41.94
Santan	Azizan Sulaiman	UMNO	42.18
Mata Ayer	Siti Berenee Yahaya	UMNO	43.54
Tambun Tulang	Ismail Kassim	UMNO	45.82
Chuping	Asmaiza Ahmad	UMNO	46.42

NON-GOVERNMENT SEATS
Marginal
Sanglang	Mohd. Shukri Ramli	PAS	40.82
Sena	Asrul Nizan Abd. Jalil	PKR	42.07
Guar Sanji	Mohd. Ridzuan Hashim	PAS	42.19
Kuala Perlis	Nor Azam Karap	PKR	51.13
Fairly safe
Indera Kayangan	Gan Ay Ling	PKR	57.71

== Results ==
The result of the election was announced after 5pm on 9 May 2018. Barisan Nasional won 10 out of 15 seats and was entitled to form a government in Perlis.

Party or alliance		Votes	%	Seats	+/–
Barisan Nasional	United Malays National Organisation	42,543	35.21	9	–3
Barisan Nasional	Malaysian Chinese Association	4,608	3.81	1	0
Barisan Nasional	Total	47,151	39.02	10	–3
Pakatan Harapan	People's Justice Party	17,935	14.84	3	+2
Pakatan Harapan	Malaysian United Indigenous Party	12,562	10.40	0	0
Pakatan Harapan	National Trust Party	9,103	7.53	0	0
Pakatan Harapan	Democratic Action Party	2,620	2.17	0	0
Pakatan Harapan	Total	42,220	34.94	3	+2
Pan-Malaysian Islamic Party		31,335	25.93	2	+1
Independents		132	0.11	0	0
Total		120,838	100.00	15	0
Valid votes		120,838	98.21		
Invalid/blank votes		2,198	1.79		
Total votes		123,036	100.00		
Registered voters/turnout		150,221	81.90		
Source: BERNAMA

=== By parliamentary constituency ===
Barisan Nasional won 2 of 3 parliamentary constituency.

No.	Constituency	Barisan Nasional	Gagasan Sejahtera	Pakatan Harapan	Member of Parliament
P001	Padang Besar	41.88%	25.72%	32.04%	Zahidi Zainul Abidin
P002	Kangar	35.69%	20.87%	43.44%	
P002	Kangar	35.69%	20.87%	43.44%	Shaharuddin Ismail (13th Parliament)
P002	Kangar	35.69%	20.87%	43.44%	Noor Amin Ahmad (14th Parliament)
P003	Arau	40.14%	31.84%	28.02%	Shahidan Kassim

=== Seats that changed allegiance ===
No.	Seat	Previous Party (2013)	Current Party (2018)
N07	(Perlis) Sena	Barisan Nasional (UMNO)	Pakatan Harapan (PKR)
N09	Kuala Perlis	Barisan Nasional (UMNO)	Pakatan Harapan (PKR)
N13	(Perlis) Guar Sanji	Barisan Nasional (UMNO)	Gagasan Sejahtera (PAS)

== Aftermath ==
=== Menteri Besar controversy ===
Azlan Man from BN was sworn in for his second term as the Menteri Besar on 24 May 2018, but the ceremony was boycotted by other BN MLAs, who named Ismail Kassim as their Menteri Besar choice. The BN state chief, Shahidan Kassim, later that day announced that Azlan was sacked as UMNO and BN member, and become an independent; however Azlan disputes the announcement, saying he had not received official sacking letter from UMNO and he is still with UMNO and BN. The King of Perlis expressed his sadness over the whole situation, and explained his rationale behind decision in accepting Azlan as the Menteri Besar.

The 9 MLAs later retracted their boycott of Azlan and announced their support for him and seeking forgiveness from the King of Perlis, on 5 June 2018. The state EXCO members were sworn in on 13 June 2018, making Perlis the last state in Malaysia to appoint EXCO members after the 2018 election. All BN MLAs were appointed as EXCO members except Ismail, who did not attend the ceremony.

On 20 June 2018, Ismail resigned from UMNO and BN, and became an independent. However he rejoined UMNO in May 2020.
