= Haron Din =

Malaysian politician and Muslim cleric

Yang Berbahagia Tuan Guru Dato' Haron Din DPMS
- هارون دين

3rd Spiritual Leader of the Malaysian Islamic Party
- In office 12 March 2015 – 15 September 2016
- President: Abdul Hadi Awang
- Preceded by: Nik Abdul Aziz Nik Mat
- Succeeded by: Hashim Jasin

Personal details
- Born: August 18, 1940 Kampung Bohor Mali, Simpang Empat, Kangar, Perlis, British Malaya (now Malaysia)
- Died: September 16, 2016 (aged 76) San Francisco, California, United States
- Resting place: Five Pillars Farm Muslim Cemetery, 1761 Laughlin Rd, Livermore, CA, United States
- Party: Malaysian Islamic Party (PAS) (1974–2016)
- Spouse: Khatijah Salleh
- Relations: Abu Hassan Din Al Hafiz (brother, deceased)
- Children: 5
- Occupation: Politician

Haron bin Din (Jawi: هارون بن دين; 18 August 1940 – 16 September 2016) was a Malaysian politician and Muslim cleric. He was the 3rd Spiritual Leader of the Malaysian Islamic Party (PAS) from March 2015 after the death of his influential predecessor Nik Abdul Aziz Nik Mat to his own death in 16 September 2016.

== Education ==
- Klang Islamic College (1962-1965) - Sijil Tertinggi Kolej
- Studies Diploma from Al-Azhar, Cairo (1966-1968)
- M.A. in Sharia from Ain-Shams, Cairo University (1972-1974) - Ph.D. in Sharia
- National University of Malaysia (UKM) bestowed upon him Professorship in the year 1986.

== Politics ==
- PAS active member from 1974
- PAS central committee member (1975-1983)
- Central Committee Chief
- PAS Scholar council
- Vice spiritual leader of PAS

== Controversies ==
=== Allah word issue ===
This particular issue tests the consensus of the ulema based party. Their top leaders including the likes of Nik Abdul Aziz Nik Mat and Abdul Hadi Awang, were supporting the word be used by Malaysian Catholics in their Malay version of the Bible. Haron however, opposed this idea by saying that it is an abomination for permitting such action. This caused a split in PAS as Haron was deemed as a prominent Islamic scholar. Haron stated that he did not agree to allow non-Muslim to use the word Allah.

== Death ==
Haron died on 16 September 2016 at the Stanford University Hospital in San Francisco, California, United States at the age of 76 after being in a coma.

== Election results ==
Perlis State Legislative Assembly
Year	Constituency	Candidate	Votes	Pct	Opponent(s)	Votes	Pct	Ballots cast	Majority	Turnout
2004	N12 Tambun Tulang	Haron Din (PAS)	2,680	37.17%	Shahidan Kassim (UMNO)	4,422	61.35%	7,208	1,742	85.33%

Parliament of Malaysia
Year	Constituency	Candidate	Votes	Pct	Opponent(s)	Votes	Pct	Ballots cast	Majority	Turnout
2004	P003 Arau	Haron Din (PAS)	14,124	44.10%	Syed Razlan Syed Putra Jamalullail (UMNO)	17,367	54.23%	32,024	3,243	84.23%
2008	P003 Arau	Haron Din (PAS)	16,151	48.27%	Ismail Kassim (UMNO)	16,451	49.17%	33,458	300	83.4%
2013	P003 Arau	Haron Din (PAS)	18,005	46.84%	Shahidan Kassim (UMNO)	19,376	50.41%	38,439	1,371	87.60%
2013	P003 Arau	Haron Din (PAS)	18,005	46.84%	Zainudin Yom (IND)	406	1.06%	38,439	1,371	87.60%

== Award ==
Haron Din was awarded Darjah Kebesaran Dato Paduka Mahkota Selangor (DPMS) from Sultan of Selangor in 2016. However, his son received the award, on behalf of Haron Din, from Sultan of Selangor. He was also awarded posthumously special 'Maal Hijrah' award from Yang Di Pertuan Agong, Tuanku Abdul Halim Mu'adzam Shah for his contribution to Islam at national and international levels.

- Selangor
  - Knight Commander of the Order of the Crown of Selangor (DPMS) – Dato' (2016 – posthumously)

== Other references ==
- Darussyifa
