= Md Isa Sabu =

Malaysian politician

Yang Berbahagia Dato' Seri Md Isa Sabu SPMP DPMP
- مد عيسى سابو

8th Menteri Besar of Perlis
- In office 17 March 2008 – 7 May 2013
- Monarch: Tuanku Syed Sirajuddin
- Preceded by: Shahidan Kassim
- Succeeded by: Azlan Man
- Constituency: Bintong

Member of the Perlis State Legislative Assembly for Bintong
- In office 8 March 2008 – 5 May 2013
- Preceded by: Rusli Mat Husin (BN–UMNO)
- Succeeded by: Rela Ahmad (BN–UMNO)
- Majority: 2,110 (2008)
- In office 1999–2004
- Preceded by: Sopiah Ahmad (BN–UMNO)
- Succeeded by: Rusli Mat Husin (BN–UMNO)
- Majority: 306 (1999)
- In office 1986 – 25 April 1995
- Preceded by: Shuib Mohamad (PAS)
- Succeeded by: Sopiah Ahmad (BN–UMNO)
- Majority: 1,784 (1986); 3,060 (1990)

Member of the Malaysian Parliament for Kangar
- In office 25 April 1995 – 29 November 1999
- Preceded by: Ishak Arshad (BN–UMNO)
- Succeeded by: Abdul Hamid Pawanteh (BN–UMNO)
- Majority: 4,000 (1995)

Personal details
- Born: 24 August 1946 (age 79) Kampung Kechor, Kangar, Perlis, Malayan Union (now Malaysia)
- Party: United Malays National Organisation (UMNO)
- Other political affiliations: Barisan Nasional (BN); Perikatan Nasional (PN); Muafakat Nasional (MN)
- Children: 7
- Education: Universiti Sains Malaysia
- Occupation: Politician

Md Isa bin Sabu (born 24 August 1946) is a Malaysian politician who served as the seventh Chief Minister of the Malaysian state of Perlis, in office from 2008 to 2013. He is a member of the United Malays National Organisation (UMNO). He held the state assembly seat of Bintong, in the Perlis capital of Kangar, until his retirement from politics in 2013.

Md Isa was sworn in as Chief Minister of Perlis on 17 March 2008 following the 2008 Malaysian election. The Raja of Perlis appointed Md Isa despite Perlis UMNO leader Shahidan Kassim having a letter of appointment from Prime Minister Abdullah Ahmad Badawi. Md Isa claimed the support of eight of his fellow UMNO assemblymen, satisfying the Raja that he could command the support of a majority of the 15-member Perlis state assembly. He did not re-contest his seat in the 2013 election, citing his age (67). He was replaced as Chief Minister by Azlan Man.

Md Isa is married with seven children. He was member of the federal parliament for Kangar from 1995 to 1999.

== Election results ==
Perlis State Legislative Assembly
Year	Constituency	Candidate	Votes	Pct	Opponent(s)	Votes	Pct	Ballots cast	Majority	Turnout
1986	N05 Bintong	Md Isa Sabu (UMNO)	3,151	69.74%	Mohd Abidin Halifah (PAS)	1,367	30.26%	4,748	1,784	74.06%
1990	N05 Bintong	Md Isa Sabu (UMNO)	4,100	79.77%	Murshid Mohamad (PAS)	1,040	20.23%	5,344	3,060	75.53%
1999	N06 Bintong	Md Isa Sabu (UMNO)	3,285	52.44%	Abdul Zakaria (PAS)	2,979	47.56%	6,399	306	82.56%
2008	N06 Bintong	Md Isa Sabu (UMNO)	4,882	63.78%	Mohd Anuar Mohd Tahir (PAS)	2,772	36.22%	7,864	2,110	83.78%

Parliament of Malaysia
Year	Constituency	Candidate	Votes	Pct	Opponent(s)	Votes	Pct	Ballots cast	Majority	Turnout
1995	P002 Kangar	Md Isa Sabu (UMNO)	20,000	55.56%	Aziz Shariff (PAS)	16,000	44.44%	36,200	4,000	

== Honours ==
- Perlis
  - Knight Grand Commander of the Order of the Crown of Perlis (SPMP) – Dato' Seri (2008)
  - Knight Commander of the Order of the Crown of Perlis (DPMP) – Dato' (2002)

Preceded by Shahidan Kassim	Menteri Besar of Perlis; 17 March 2008 – 7 May 2013	Succeeded by Azlan Man
