= Abdul Hamid Pawanteh =

Malaysian politician (1944–2022)

Yang Berbahagia Tan Sri Dato' Seri Dr. Abdul Hamid Pawanteh PSM SPMP
- عبدالحميد ڤاونتيه

14th President of the Dewan Negara
- In office 7 July 2003 – 6 July 2009
- Monarchs: Syed Sirajuddin (2003–2006); Mizan Zainal Abidin (2006–2009)
- Deputy: Gapar Gurrohu (2003); Wong Foon Meng (2004–2009)
- Preceded by: Michael Chen Wing Sum
- Succeeded by: Wong Foon Meng

6th Menteri Besar of Perlis
- In office 14 August 1986 – 5 May 1995
- Monarch: Syed Putra
- Preceded by: Ali Ahmad (BN–UMNO)
- Succeeded by: Shahidan Kassim (BN–UMNO)

Member of the Malaysian Parliament for Kangar
- In office 29 November 1999 – 7 July 2003
- Preceded by: Md Isa Sabu (BN–UMNO)
- Succeeded by: Mohd Radzi Sheikh Ahmad (BN–UMNO)

Member of the Malaysian Parliament for Arau
- In office 1982–1986
- Preceded by: Syed Hassan Syed Mohamed (BN–UMNO)
- Succeeded by: Shahidan Kassim (BN–UMNO)

Personal details
- Born: Abdul Hamid bin Pawanteh; 27 July 1944 Penang, Japanese-occupied Malaya
- Died: 1 December 2022 (aged 78) Arau, Perlis, Malaysia
- Citizenship: Malaysian
- Party: United Malay National Organisation (UMNO) (–2022)
- Other political affiliations: Barisan Nasional (BN) (–2022)
- Spouse(s): Elham Hamid Abdullah (née Elsie Sarstedt McCarthy) (died 2024)
- Children: 5
- Education: Dow Medical College
- Occupation: Politician
- Profession: Physician

Abdul Hamid bin Pawanteh (27 July 1944 – 1 December 2022) was a Malaysian politician. He was the President of the Dewan Negara from 2003 to 2009, Deputy Speaker of the Dewan Rakyat from 1984 to 1986, and was the Menteri Besar of Perlis from 1986 to 1995. He held these offices as a member of the United Malays National Organisation (UMNO), the leading party in Malaysia's ruling Barisan Nasional (BN) coalition during those periods.

Abdul Hamid was born on 27 July 1944 in Penang and received secondary education at Penang Free School. He received his Bachelor of Medicine and Surgery (MBBS) degree in 1973 from Dow Medical College. He was elected to the Malaysian House of Representatives in the 1982 election for the seat of Arau in Perlis. In 1986, he moved to the Perlis State Assembly and became the State's Menteri Besar. In 1995, he was replaced as Menteri Besar by fellow UMNO member Shahidan Kassim, and returned to the House of Representatives in 1999 for the seat of Kangar in Perlis. In July 2003, Abdul Hamid stepped down as the Member of Parliament for Kangar to be appointed as the President of the Senate, where he served until 2009.

Abdul Hamid died in Arau on 1 December 2022, at the age of 78.

== Election results ==
Parliament of Malaysia
Year	Constituency	Candidate	Votes	Pct	Opponent(s)	Votes	Pct	Ballot cast	Majority	Turnout
1982	P002 Arau	Abdul Hamid Pawanteh (UMNO)	17,464	63.60%	Mahamood Mohamad Noor (PAS)	9,994	36.40%	28,462	7,470	76.85%
1999	P002 Kangar	Abdul Hamid Pawanteh (UMNO)	16,529	56.98%	Zainul Abidin Yahaya (PAS)	12,480	43.02%	29,564	4,049	79.42%

Perlis State Legislative Assembly
Year	Constituency	Candidate	Votes	Pct	Opponent(s)	Votes	Pct	Ballot cast	Majority	Turnout
1986	N11 Kota Raja	Abdul Hamid Pawanteh (UMNO)	3,176	68.71%	Bahari Ali (PAS)	1,195	25.85%	4,823	1,981	71.05%
1986	N11 Kota Raja	Abdul Hamid Pawanteh (UMNO)	3,176	68.71%	Chong Teik Tee (IND)	251	5.43%	4,823	1,981	71.05%
1990	N11 Kota Raja	Abdul Hamid Pawanteh (UMNO)	3,794	67.16%	Syed Darus Syed Hashim (S46)	1,855	32.84%	5,853	1,939	75.79%

== Honours ==
=== Honours of Malaysia ===
- Malaysia
  - Commander of the Order of Loyalty to the Crown of Malaysia (PSM) – Tan Sri (1994)
- Perlis
  - Knight Grand Commander of the Order of the Crown of Perlis (SPMP) – Dato' Seri (1994)
