= 1Malaysia People's Housing Programme =

Housing development program

Perumahan Rakyat 1Malaysia (PR1MA) Berhad
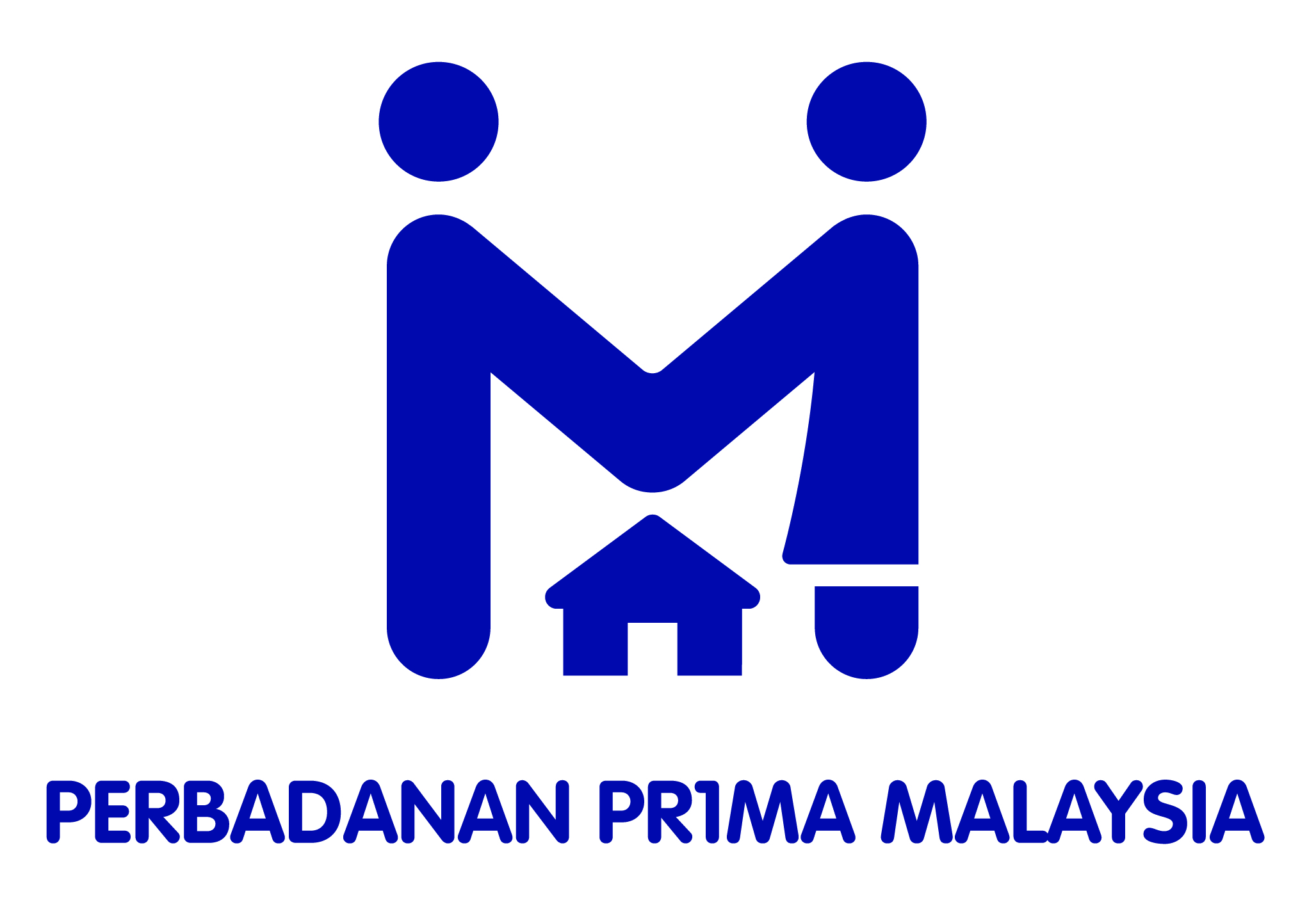
- Type: Government-linked company
- Industry: Housing development
- Founded: 2011
- Headquarters: Ara Damansara, Selangor, Malaysia
- Key people: YBhg. Datuk Azrulnizam bin Abdul Aziz, Chairman
- Website: www.pr1ma.my

The 1Malaysia Housing Programme or Perumahan Rakyat 1Malaysia (PR1MA) is a housing development programme in Malaysia. Launched on 4 July 2011 by former Prime Minister Najib Razak, the project is currently managed by the government-owned company Perbadanan PR1MA Malaysia under the Ministry of Local Government Development. PR1MA mission is to plan, develop and provide affordable and high-quality homes inspired by modern living concepts for middle-income Malaysians.

== See also ==
- Projek Perumahan Rakyat (PPR)
