= Shahidan Kassim =

Malaysian politician

Yang Berhormat Dato' Seri Shahidan Kassim SPMP SSAP AMP PPA PKN MP
- شهيدان قاسم
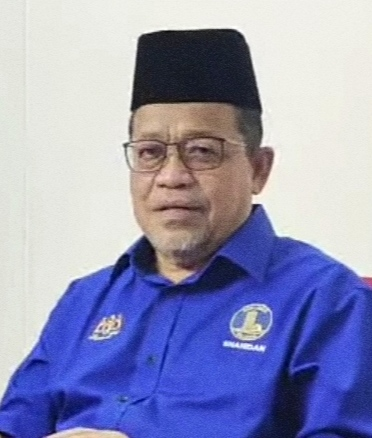

Minister of Federal Territories
- In office 30 August 2021 – 24 November 2022
- Monarch: Abdullah
- Prime Minister: Ismail Sabri Yaakob
- Deputy: Jalaluddin Alias
- Preceded by: Annuar Musa
- Succeeded by: Zaliha Mustafa (Minister in the Prime Minister's Department (Federal Territories))
- Constituency: Arau

Minister in the Prime Minister's Department
- In office 16 May 2013 – 10 May 2018
- Monarchs: Abdul Halim (2013–2016); Muhammad V (2016–2018)
- Prime Minister: Najib Razak
- Deputy: Razali Ibrahim (2013–2015)
- Preceded by: Mohamed Nazri Abdul Aziz
- Succeeded by: Liew Vui Keong
- Constituency: Arau

7th Menteri Besar of Perlis
- In office 6 May 1995 – 17 March 2008
- Monarchs: Putra; Sirajuddin
- Preceded by: Abdul Hamid Pawanteh
- Succeeded by: Md Isa Sabu
- Constituency: Tambun Tulang

President of the Kuala Lumpur City F.C.
- In office 24 August 2022 – 8 June 2023
- Preceded by: Annuar Musa
- Succeeded by: Fahmi Fadzil

Chairman of the Perbadanan Perumahan Rakyat 1Malaysia
- In office 9 March 2021 – 12 November 2021
- Minister: Zuraida Kamaruddin (2021); Reezal Merican Naina Merican (2021)
- Preceded by: Eddy Chen
- Succeeded by: Fathul Bari Mat Jahya

Chairman of the Perikatan Nasional Government Backbenchers Club
- In office 16 May 2020 – 16 August 2021
- Monarch: Abdullah
- Prime Minister: Muhyiddin Yassin
- Deputy: Nik Muhammad Zawawi Salleh
- Preceded by: Position established
- Succeeded by: Position abolished

Member of the Malaysian Parliament for Arau
- Incumbent
- Assumed office 5 May 2013
- Preceded by: Ismail Kassim (BN–UMNO)
- Majority: 1,371 (2013); 4,856 (2018); 23,216 (2022)
- In office 3 August 1986 – 24 April 1995
- Preceded by: Abdul Hamid Pawanteh (BN–UMNO)
- Succeeded by: Kamarudin Ahmad (BN–UMNO)
- Majority: 7,065 (1986); 7,794 (1990)

Member of the Perlis State Legislative Assembly for Tambun Tulang
- In office 24 April 1995 – 5 May 2013
- Preceded by: Position established
- Succeeded by: Ismail Kassim (BN–UMNO)
- Majority: 2,116 (1995); 877 (1999); 1,742 (2004); 2,010 (2008)

Personal details
- Born: Shahidan bin Kassim; 17 June 1951 (age 75) Tambun Tulang, Perlis, Federation of Malaya (now Malaysia)
- Citizenship: Malaysian
- Party: United Malays National Organisation (UMNO) (1967–2022); Malaysian Islamic Party (PAS) (since 2022)
- Other political affiliations: Barisan Nasional (BN) (1967–2022); Perikatan Nasional (PN) (since 2022)
- Relations: Ismail Kassim (younger brother)
- Education: University of Malaya; International Institute of Social Studies; Universiti Utara Malaysia
- Occupation: Politician
- Shahidan Kassim on Facebook; Shahidan Kassim on Parliament of Malaysia

Shahidan bin Kassim (Jawi: شهيدان بن قاسم; born 17 June 1951) is a Malaysian politician. He has served as the Member of Parliament (MP) for Arau from August 1986 to April 1995 and again since May 2013. He served as the Minister of Federal Territories.

President of the Kuala Lumpur City F.C. from August 2022 to June 2023, Chairman of the Perbadanan Perumahan Rakyat 1Malaysia (PR1MA) from March to November 2021, Minister in the Prime Minister's Department in the BN administration under former Prime Minister Najib Razak from May 2013 to May 2018, 7th Menteri Besar of Perlis from May 1995 to March 2008 and Member of the Perlis State Legislative Assembly (MLA) for Tambun Tulang from April 1995 to May 2013. He is a Member of Central Working Committee of the Malaysian Islamic Party (PAS), a component party of the Perikatan Nasional (PN) coalition and was a member of the United Malays National Organisation (UMNO), a component party of the BN coalition. He served as the Chairman of the PN Government Backbenchers Club (PNBBC) from May 2020 to the collapse of the PN government in August 2021. He is also the longest serving Menteri Besar of Perlis and the older brother of Ismail Kassim, former MP for Arau and former MLA for Tambun Tulang.

== Early life ==
Shahidan was born in Tambun Tulang on 17 June 1951. He went to Sekolah Menengah Sultan Abdul Halim (popularly known as Jenan) and served as Head of Rumah Cendikia.

He obtained a Bachelor Degree in Economics and History from the University of Malaya. Shahidan subsequently pursued studies in Development Studies at the Institute of Social Studies in The Hague, Netherlands. In 2006, he was awarded a Doctor of Philosophy degree by Universiti Utara Malaysia.

== Political career ==
Shahidan was a Member of Parliament for Arau from 1986 to 1995.

He was elected to the Perlis State Legislative Assembly for the newly created seat of Tambun Tulang in the 1995 general elections. He immediately became Chief Minister of Perlis, taking over from Hamid Pawanteh. His tenure as Chief Minister came to an end in March 2008, when Md Isa Sabu, a fellow member of Barisan Nasional, was appointed to the post by Raja Sirajuddin of Perlis after a general election in which UMNO retained its majority in the State Assembly. Md Isa claimed the support of eight out of the 12 other Barisan Nasional members of the Perlis State Assembly to replace Shahidan. While Shahidan had the nomination of the Prime Minister, Abdullah Badawi, and the state party machinery, the Raja was concerned about the stability of the state government should Shahidan, a powerful but divisive factional figure in UMNO, be reappointed. The Raja insisted upon appointing Md Isa instead, exercising his constitutional discretion to prevail over the wishes of Abdullah and UMNO. Shahidan left the Perlis Executive Council (a body akin to a Cabinet), sitting out the 2008–13 State Assembly term as a backbencher and criticising Md Isa's leadership.

In the 2013 general elections, Shahidan returned to federal Parliament in the seat of Arau, switching seats with his brother Ismail Kassim, who had held Arau since 2008. Shahidan defeated the senior Pan-Malaysian Islamic Party (PAS) leader Haron Din by 1,371 votes. Despite his return to federal politics, Shahidan had stated before the election that his preference would have been to remain in the State Assembly. After the election, he was appointed to the cabinet of Najib Razak as a Minister in the Prime Minister's Department. In 2018 general election, he was reelected as the Arau MP while he was removed from the Cabinet and government following victory of the Pakatan Harapan (PH) opposition coalition in the election, the government was taken over by the new coalition after more than six decades when BN remained in power. The PH government collapsed in February 2020, a new coalition, namely Perikatan Nasional (PN), took over the government in March 2020. On 9 March 2021, Minister of Housing and Local Government Zuraida Kamaruddin announced his appointments as both Chairman of Perbadanan Perumahan Rakyat 1Malaysia (PR1MA) and Chairman of the National Housing Corporation (NHC) with immediate effect. On 24 April 2021, he was removed from the position of the State Chairman of Perlis of UMNO by party President Ahmad Zahid Hamidi and being replaced by Azlan Man, who is also the Menteri Besar of Perlis.

== Political positions ==
=== Transportation ===
Shahidan Kassim refused that the traffic fines be increased from RM 300 to RM 500 which was mentioned in the 2026 Revision of the Road Transport Act 1987, such as Section 14 of the act, which states: "Not displaying vehicle's registration number on the number plate".

== Controversies and issues ==
According to Joceline Tan, columnist for The Star, Shahidan has a "larger-than-life personality" and is known for his "warlord style of politics". He has held numerous positions in sports administration, including the presidencies of the Malaysia Athletic Federation, the Amateur Swimming Union of Malaysia and the Perlis Football Association. In 2010, he called for Facebook to be banned in Malaysia, citing national security issues after a Facebook account holder was found to have insulted Islam and the current as well as the former Prime Ministers of Malaysia.

In 1992, he received international coverage for his criticism of what he cited as the criminal acts of Sultan Iskandar of Johor and his son Tunku Ibrahim Ismail.

Shahidan is a leading proponent of Salafism—a puritanical Sunni Islamic movement opposed by Malaysia's religious establishment—within UMNO. In 2010 he arranged for a group of young Salafi clerics, including Fathul Bari Mat Jahya, to join UMNO to boost the party's standing with conservative Muslim voters. While Chief Minister of Perlis, his government passed anti-apostasy laws in the State Assembly and sought to loosen restrictions on polygamy in the state.

In 2017, Shahidan declared that "atheism is against the Constitution and the basic human rights" in Malaysia since "there is no provision on atheism" in the Constitution. Shahidan wanted atheists and atheist groups like the Kuala Lumpur chapter of Atheist Republic to be identified and hunted down. He also stated that "we need to restore the faith back in them, especially for Muslims. Actually they don't really want to be an atheist, but they lack knowledge about religion and that is why they are easily swayed to the new age teaching".

On 20 October 2018, a police report was made by a teenage girl, 15, alleged that Shahidan had molested her but the report was withdrawn by the victim's family on the same day. The victim from Arau, Perlis, wrote in her police report that she was told by her teacher that the former minister had wanted to see her after he saw her perform with a band at Stadium Tuanku Syed Putra. The secondary school student had been performing with a group, Kumpulan Aukustika on 7 @ DSSK Busker. According to her, when she went to the Shahidan's car, he invited her to play in Kuala Lumpur and offered her an RM4,000 fee. She alleged that during the discussion, he held her hand and caressed her shoulder without her consent. The student said she immediately ran out crying of the car. After full police investigation, Shahidan was charged with molesting the underage girl at the Sessions Court, Kangar on 12 November 2018. On 24 April 2019, Shahidan was given a discharge not amounting to an acquittal by the Kangar Sessions Court for the allegation of molesting of an underage girl after the victim retracted her report. In 2021, Shahidan's initial selection for the women, children and social development affairs Parliamentary Special Select Committee (SSC) had to be rescinded and replaced by another MP after his appointment was widely condemned and objected as he is claimed being 'tainted' with his child molestation case in 2019.

== Election results ==
Parliament of Malaysia
Year	Constituency	Candidate	Votes	Pct	Opponent(s)	Votes	Pct	Ballot cast	Majority	Turnout
1986	P002 Arau	Shahidan Kassim (UMNO)	18,156	62.08%	Tengku Abdul Rahman (PAS)	11,091	37.92%	30,077	7,065	74.61%
1990	P002 Arau	Shahidan Kassim (UMNO)	20,948	61.43%	Khalid Abdul Samad (PAS)	13,154	38.57%	35,196	7,794	77.42%
2013	P003 Arau	Shahidan Kassim (UMNO)	19,376	51.28%	Haron Din (PAS)	18,005	47.65%	38,439	1,371	87.61%
2013	P003 Arau	Shahidan Kassim (UMNO)	19,376	51.28%	Zainudin Yom (IND)	406	1.08%	38,439	1,371	87.61%
2018	P003 Arau	Shahidan Kassim (UMNO)	16,547	41.79%	Abd Rahman Daud (BERSATU)	11,691	29.52%	40,433	4,856	83.91%
2018	P003 Arau	Shahidan Kassim (UMNO)	16,547	41.79%	Hashim Jasin (PAS)	11,362	28.69%	40,433	4,856	83.91%
2022	P003 Arau	Shahidan Kassim (PAS)	31,458	67.23%	Rozabil Abd Rahman (UMNO)	8,242	17.62%	47,604	23,216	76.86%
2022	P003 Arau	Shahidan Kassim (PAS)	31,458	67.23%	Fathin Amelina Fazlie (PKR)	7,089	15.15%	47,604	23,216	76.86%

Perlis State Legislative Assembly
Year	Constituency	Candidate	Votes	Pct	Opponent(s)	Votes	Pct	Ballot cast	Majority	Turnout
1995	N12 Tambun Tulang	Shahidan Kassim (UMNO)	3,777	69.46%	Alias Othman (S46)	1,661	30.54%	5,579	2,116	77.40%
1999	N12 Tambun Tulang	Shahidan Kassim (UMNO)	3,464	57.25%	Ismail Ahmad (PAS)	2,587	42.75%	6,177	877	82.72%
2004	N12 Tambun Tulang	Shahidan Kassim (UMNO)	4,422	62.26%	Haron Din (PAS)	2,680	37.74%	7,208	1,742	85.33%
2008	N12 Tambun Tulang	Shahidan Kassim (UMNO)	4,371	64.93%	Che Nordin Che Ahmad (PAS)	2,361	35.07%	6,872	2,010	79.14%

== Honours ==
=== Honours of Malaysia ===
- Malaysia
  - Recipient of the General Service Medal (PPA)
  - Recipient of the National Sovereignty Medal (PKN) (2014)
  - Recipient of the 12th Yang di-Pertuan Agong Installation Medal (2002)
  - Recipient of the 17th Yang di-Pertuan Agong Installation Medal (2024)
- Pahang
  - Knight Grand Companion of the Order of Sultan Ahmad Shah of Pahang (SSAP) – Dato' Sri (2002)
- Perlis
  - Knight Grand Commander of the Order of the Crown of Perlis (SPMP) – Dato' Seri (1995)
  - Member of the Order of the Crown of Perlis (AMP) (1980)
  - Recipient of the Tuanku Syed Sirajuddin Jamalullail Installation Medal (2001)
