= Ameir Hassan =

Malaysian politician

Ameir bin Hassan (Jawi: امياير بن حسن) is a Malaysian politician. He was the Pakatan Harapan state chief for Perlis until he was replaced by Noor Amin Ahmad on 10 May 2021.
