= Azlan Man =

Malaysian politician and diplomat

Yang Berbahagia Dato' Seri Azlan Man SPMP

9th Menteri Besar of Perlis
- In office 7 May 2013 – 22 November 2022
- Monarch: Sirajuddin
- Preceded by: Md Isa Sabu
- Succeeded by: Mohd Shukri Ramli
- Constituency: Pauh (2013–2018); Bintong (2018–2022)

Member of the Perlis State Legislative Assembly for Bintong
- In office 9 May 2018 – 19 November 2022
- Preceded by: Rela Ahmad (BN–UMNO)
- Succeeded by: Fakhrul Anwar Ismail (PN–PAS)
- Majority: 847 (2018)

Member of the Perlis State Legislative Assembly for Pauh
- In office 5 May 2013 – 9 May 2018
- Preceded by: Syed Razlan Putra Jamalullail (BN–UMNO)
- Succeeded by: Rozieana Ahmad (BN–UMNO)
- Majority: 1,382 (2013)

State Chairman of the Barisan Nasional of Perlis
- In office 24 April 2021 – 27 April 2023
- National Chairman: Ahmad Zahid Hamidi
- Preceded by: Shahidan Kassim
- Succeeded by: Rozabil Abdul Rahman

State Chairman of the United Malays National Organisation of Perlis
- In office 24 April 2021 – 22 March 2023
- President: Ahmad Zahid Hamidi
- Preceded by: Shahidan Kassim
- Succeeded by: Rozabil Abdul Rahman

Faction represented in Perlis State Legislative Assembly
- 2013–2022: Barisan Nasional

Personal details
- Born: Azlan bin Man; 2 September 1958 (age 68) Kampung Belat Batu, Arau, Perlis, Malaya (now Malaysia)
- Citizenship: Malaysian
- Party: United Malay National Organisation (UMNO)
- Other political affiliations: Barisan Nasional (BN)
- Spouse: Nor Aswana Omar
- Education: University of Denver
- Occupation: Politician

Dato' Seri Azlan bin Man (born 2 September 1958) is a Malaysian politician and diplomat who served as the 9th Menteri Besar of Perlis from 7 May 2013 to 22 November 2022, and Member of the Perlis State Legislative Assembly (MLA) for Bintong from May 2018 to November 2022. He also served as the MLA for Pauh from May 2013 to May 2018. He is a member of the United Malays National Organisation (UMNO), a component party of the Barisan Nasional (BN) coalition. He also served as the State Chairman of BN of Perlis from April 2021 to April 2023 and of UMNO of Perlis from April 2021 to March 2023.

== Diplomatic and civil service careers ==
Azlan graduated from the University of Denver with a degree in international economics before joining the administrative and diplomatic service. One of his diplomatic positions was Permanent Mission Counsellor of Malaysia to the United Nations (UN), he was appointed to the position in 1999. He was appointed as the Deputy Director of the Public Complaints Bureau in 2011. He left civil service and returned to his home state Perlis in 2013.

== Political career ==
=== Menteri Besar of Perlis and Member of the Perlis State Legislative Assembly (2013–2022) ===
==== 2013 Perlis state election ====
In the 2013 Perlis state election, he began his active political career by making his electoral debut after being nominated by BN to contest for the Pauh state seat. He won the seat and was elected into the Perlis State Legislative Assembly as the Pauh MLA after defeating Idris Yaacob of Pakatan Rakyat (PR) by a majority of 1,382 votes. He was also appointed as the 9th Menteri Besar of Perlis for the first term, replacing Md Isa Sabu who was retiring from politics. He was sworn in by Raja of Perlis Sirajuddin on 7 May 2013.

==== 2018 Perlis state election ====
In the 2018 Perlis state election, Azlan was nominated by BN to contest for the Bintong state seat instead of defending the Pauh seat. He won the seat and was elected as the Bintong MLA for the first term after defeating Mokhtar Che Kassim of Pakatan Harapan (PH) and Abd Jamil Kamis of Gagasan Sejahtera (GS) by a majority of 847 votes. He was also reappointed as the Menteri Besar for the second term and sworn in by Raja Sirajuddin on 24 May 2018. His reappointment was however controversial. His swearing-in ceremony was boycotted by other BN MLAs, who favoured Tambun Tulang MLA Ismail Kassim as the Menteri Besar. Then State Chairman of BN and UMNO of Perlis as well as the brother of Ismail Kassim Shahidan Kassim later sacked Azlan from BN and UMNO, effectively turning Azlan into an independent, creating the illegitimacy of Azlan as the Menteri Besar and trying to remove Azlan from the position. Azlan argued and disputed the sacking, claiming that he had not received any official sacking letters or notices from the coalition and the party and hence he was still a BN and UMNO member. The BN MLAs later retracted their boycott of Azlan and announced their support for him as Menteri Besar on 5 June 2018.

==== 2022 Perlis state election ====
In the 2022 Perlis state election, Azlan was renominated to defend the Bintong seat. He lost the seat and was not reelected as the Bintong MLA for the second term after losing to Fakhrul Anwar Ismail of Perikatan Nasional (PN) by a majority of 4,329 votes. In addition, he led BN to a huge defeat and wipeout. It is the biggest electoral upset in the history of Perlis as BN has been dominant in the politics of the state since early days of the independence of Federation of Malaya in 1959. None of the BN candidates won a seat in the elections as BN lost all the 10 seats it previously held to PN. The elections ended 63-year rule of BN in the state, saw the first ever transition of power in the history of the state and replaced BN with PN as the dominant political force in the state as PN won 14 out of 15 state seats and therefore two-thirds supermajority of the assembly. State Chairman of PN of Perlis, State Commissioner of Malaysian Islamic Party (PAS) of Perlis and Sanglang MLA Mohd Shukri Ramli replaced Azlan as the new and 10th Menteri Besar of Perlis. Many political analysts and scholars attributed the results to the "green wave", a new phrase describing the spread of political influence of PAS which is represented by a green flag from the east coast areas of Peninsular Malaysia to other areas like Perlis located at the northwest coast of the peninsular.

=== Controversies and issues ===
==== Corruption ====
On 9 April 2023, it was reported that Azlan would be charged with corruption in the Sessions Court of Kangar on 10 April 2023. According to e-kehakiman website, Azlan was named as the accused to be charged before judge Norsalha Hamzah. The Malaysian Anti-Corruption Commission (MACC) also confirmed his charge. According to media reports, he was expected to be charged under Section 18 of the MACC Act 2009. On 10 April 2023, Azlan was charged with five counts of submitting documents that are false or contain false details specifically false claims amounting to RM1.185 million for his trip to the United Kingdom from 2013 to 2017 with the intention of deceiving. However, Azlan pleaded not guilty. Norsalha fixed 12 May 2023 for next mention with a RM 50,000 bail with one surety and ordered Azlan to surrender his passport. It was also reported that Azlan would face charges under the Anti-Money Laundering and Anti-Terrorism Financing and Proceeds of Illegal Activities Act (AMLATFPUAA) at the Sessions Court of Kuala Lumpur on 12 April 2023. On 12 April 2023, Azlan was charged with another five counts of receiving proceeds from illegal activity amounting to RM 1.06 million from Sri Kedawang Travel & Tours (W) Sdn Bhd, Aidil Travel & Tours Sdn Bhd and one Abdul Rahim Halim who represented Aidil Travel before judge Azura Alwi. Azlan was also accused of committing the offences at Maybank Jalan Tuanku Abdul Rahman, CIMB Bank Putrajaya and Sheraton Imperial Hotel from February 2014 to December 2017. Azlan again pleaded not guilty. Deputy Public Prosecutor (DPP) Ahmad Akram Gharib informed the court that the offence was non-bailable but he did not object if the court exercises its discretion to release Azlan on bail and Ahmad Akram offered RM 50,000 in one surety. The prosecution also informed the court that it would seek to try both cases of Azlan in Perlis and Kuala Lumpur together. The lawyer of Azlan Burhanudeen Abdul Wahid agreed with the bail amount offered by the prosecution. Azura then fixed bail at RM50,000 in one surety and fixed 9 June 2023 for next mention. On 12 May 2023, the case of Azlan who was facing five counts of submitting documents that are false or contain false details was transferred to the Kuala Lumpur Sessions Court after Norsalha allowed the application of the prosecution on the grounds that it would be heard together with another five charges of money laundering. In addition, the MACC DPP Rehab Abdul Shukur also added that the witnesses and the investigation of the cases were the same, hence it would be easier to hear the case together in Kuala Lumpur. Azlan was represented by his lawyers Burhanudeen and Ramli Shariff.

== Election results ==
Perlis State Legislative Assembly
Year	Constituency	Candidate	Votes	Pct	Opponent(s)	Votes	Pct	Ballots cast	Majority	Turnout
2013	N11 Pauh	Azlan Man (UMNO)	4,769	58.34%	Idris Yaacob (PAS)	3,387	41.43%	8,333	1,382	86.86%
2018	N06 Bintong	Azlan Man (UMNO)	3,986	40.59%	Mokhtar Che Kassim (AMANAH)	3,139	31.96%	9,820	847	82.92%
2018	N06 Bintong	Azlan Man (UMNO)	3,986	40.59%	Abd Jamil Kamis (PAS)	2,695	27.44%	9,820	847	82.92%
2022	N06 Bintong	Azlan Man (UMNO)	2,996	18.31%	Fakhrul Anwar Ismail (PAS)	7,325	44.76%	12,721	4,329	79.00%
2022	N06 Bintong	Azlan Man (UMNO)	2,996	18.31%	Azhari Ahmad (AMANAH)	2,029	12.40%	12,721	4,329	79.00%
2022	N06 Bintong	Azlan Man (UMNO)	2,996	18.31%	Shazwan Suban (PEJUANG)	157	1.00%	12,721	4,329	79.00%
2022	N06 Bintong	Azlan Man (UMNO)	2,996	18.31%	Hashim Suboh (Independent)	157	1.00%	12,721	4,329	79.00%
2022	N06 Bintong	Azlan Man (UMNO)	2,996	18.31%	Mohamad Khair Mohd Noor (WARISAN)	57	0.35%	12,721	4,329	79.00%

== Honours ==
- Perlis
  - Knight Grand Commander of the Order of the Crown of Perlis (SPMP) – Dato' Seri (2014)

Preceded by Md Isa Sabu	Menteri Besar of Perlis; 7 May 2013 – 22 November 2022	Succeeded by Mohd Shukri Ramli
