= Menteri Besar of Perlis =

Head of government in Perlis, Malaysia

- Incumbent; Abu Bakar Hamzah since 28 December 2025
- Government of Perlis
- Style: Yang Amat Berhormat (The Most Honourable)
- Member of: Perlis State Executive Council
- Reports to: Perlis State Legislative Assembly
- Residence: Jalan Tun Abdul Razak, Kangar, Perlis
- Seat: Aras 3, Kompleks Dewan Undangan Negeri, Persiaran Wawasan, 01000 Kangar, Perlis
- Appointer: Sirajuddin; Raja of Perlis
- Term length: 5 years or lesser, renewable once (while commanding the confidence of the Perlis State Legislative Assembly; With State Elections held no more than five years apart)
- Constituting instrument: Constitution of the State of Perlis
- Inaugural holder: Raja Ahmad Raja Endut
- Formation: 1 February 1948; 78 years ago
- Deputy: Vacant
- Website: www.perlis.gov.my/index.php/en/kerajaan/menteri-besar

The Menteri Besar of Perlis or First Minister of Perlis is the head of government in the Malaysian state of Perlis. According to convention, the Menteri Besar is the leader of the majority party or largest coalition party of the Perlis State Legislative Assembly.

The 10th and current Menteri Besar of Perlis is Abu Bakar Hamzah, who took office on 28 December 2025.

== Appointment ==
According to the state constitution, the Raja of Perlis shall first appoint the Menteri Besar to preside over the Executive Council and requires such Menteri Besar to be a member of the Legislative Assembly who in his judgment is likely to command the confidence of the majority of the members of the Assembly, must be an ethnic Malay who professes the religion of Islam and must not a Malaysian citizen by naturalisation or by registration. The Raja on the Menteri Besar's advice shall appoint not more than ten nor less than four members from among the members of the Legislative Assembly.

The member of the Executive Council must take and subscribe in the presence of the Raja the oath of office and allegiance as well as the oath of secrecy before they can exercise the functions of office. The Executive Council shall be collectively responsible to the Legislative Assembly. The members of the Executive Council shall not hold any office of profit and engage in any trade, business or profession that will cause conflict of interest.

If a government cannot get its appropriation (budget) legislation passed by the Legislative Assembly, or the Legislative Assembly passes a vote of "no confidence" in the government, the Menteri Besar is bound by convention to resign immediately. The Raja's choice of replacement Menteri Besar will be dictated by the circumstances. A member of the Executive Council other than the Menteri Besar shall hold office during the pleasure of the Raja, unless the appointment of any member of the Executive Council shall have been revoked by the Raja on the advice of the Menteri Besar but may at any time resign his office.

Following a resignation in other circumstances, defeated in an election or the death of the Menteri Besar, the Raja will generally appoint as Menteri Besar the person voted by the governing party as their new leader.

== Powers ==
The power of the Menteri Besar is subject to a number of limitations. Menteri Besar removed as leader of his or her party, or whose government loses a vote of no confidence in the Legislative Assembly, must advise a state election or resign the office or be dismissed by the Raja. The defeat of a supply bill (one that concerns the spending of money) or unable to pass important policy-related legislation is seen to require the resignation of the government or dissolution of Legislative Assembly, much like a non-confidence vote, since a government that cannot spend money is hamstrung, also called loss of supply.

The Menteri Besar's party will normally have a majority in the Legislative Assembly and party discipline is exceptionally strong in Perlis politics, so passage of the government's legislation through the Legislative Assembly is mostly a formality.

== Caretaker Menteri Besar ==
The legislative assembly unless sooner dissolved by the Raja with His Majesty's own discretion on the advice of the Menteri Besar shall continue for five years from the date of its first meeting. The state constitution permits a delay of 60 days of general election to be held from the date of dissolution and the legislative assembly shall be summoned to meet on a date not later than 120 days from the date of dissolution. Conventionally, between the dissolution of one legislative assembly and the convening of the next, the Menteri Besar and the executive council remain in office in a caretaker capacity.

== List of Menteris Besar of Perlis ==
The following is the list of Menteris Besar of Perlis since 1948:

Colour key (for political parties):
Alliance Party Barisan Nasional Independent Perikatan Nasional

No.	Portrait	Name (Birth–Death) Constituency	Term of office			Party (Note: This column names only the Menteri Besar's party. The state government he heads may be a complex coalition of several parties and independents; those are not listed here.)	Election	Assembly
No.	Portrait	Name (Birth–Death) Constituency	Took office	Left office	Time in office	Party	Election	Assembly
1		Raja Ahmad Raja Endut (1892–1977)	1 February 1948	30 January 1957	8 years, 365 days	Independent	–	–
2		Mohd Razali Mohamed Ali Wasi (1903-1981)	31 January 1957	30 April 1959	2 years, 90 days	Independent	–	–
3		Sheikh Ahmad Mohd Hashim (1897–1982); MLA for Bintong (until 1964); MLA for Kuala Perlis (from 1964)	1 May 1959	31 December 1971	12 years, 245 days	Alliance (UMNO)	1959	1st
3		Sheikh Ahmad Mohd Hashim (1897–1982); MLA for Bintong (until 1964); MLA for Kuala Perlis (from 1964)	1 May 1959	31 December 1971	12 years, 245 days	Alliance (UMNO)	1964	2nd
3		Sheikh Ahmad Mohd Hashim (1897–1982); MLA for Bintong (until 1964); MLA for Kuala Perlis (from 1964)	1 May 1959	31 December 1971	12 years, 245 days	Alliance (UMNO)	1969	3rd
4		Jaafar Hassan (1925-1987); MLA for Sanglang (until 1974); MLA for Bintong (from 1974)	1 January 1972	22 October 1981	9 years, 295 days	Alliance (UMNO)	–	3rd
4		Jaafar Hassan (1925-1987); MLA for Sanglang (until 1974); MLA for Bintong (from 1974)	1 January 1972	22 October 1981	9 years, 295 days	BN (UMNO)	1974	4th
4		Jaafar Hassan (1925-1987); MLA for Sanglang (until 1974); MLA for Bintong (from 1974)	1 January 1972	22 October 1981	9 years, 295 days	BN (UMNO)	1978	5th
5		Ali Ahmad (1925-1992); MLA for Oran	1 November 1981	13 August 1986	4 years, 286 days	BN (UMNO)	–	5th
5		Ali Ahmad (1925-1992); MLA for Oran	1 November 1981	13 August 1986	4 years, 286 days	BN (UMNO)	1982	6th
6		Tan Sri Dato' Seri; Abdul Hamid Pawanteh (1944–2022); MLA for Kota Raja	13 August 1986	6 May 1995	8 years, 267 days	BN (UMNO)	1986	7th
6		Tan Sri Dato' Seri; Abdul Hamid Pawanteh (1944–2022); MLA for Kota Raja	13 August 1986	6 May 1995	8 years, 267 days	BN (UMNO)	1990	8th
7		Dato' Seri; Shahidan Kassim (born 1951); MLA for Tambun Tulang	6 May 1995	17 March 2008	12 years, 317 days	BN (UMNO)	1995	9th
7		Dato' Seri; Shahidan Kassim (born 1951); MLA for Tambun Tulang	6 May 1995	17 March 2008	12 years, 317 days	BN (UMNO)	1999	10th
7		Dato' Seri; Shahidan Kassim (born 1951); MLA for Tambun Tulang	6 May 1995	17 March 2008	12 years, 317 days	BN (UMNO)	2004	11th
8		Dato' Seri; Md Isa Sabu (born 1946); MLA for Bintong	17 March 2008	7 May 2013	5 years, 52 days	BN (UMNO)	2008	12th
9		Dato' Seri; Azlan Man (born 1958); MLA for Pauh (2013–2018); MLA for Bintong (2018–2022)	7 May 2013	22 November 2022	9 years, 200 days	BN (UMNO)	2013	13th
9		Dato' Seri; Azlan Man (born 1958); MLA for Pauh (2013–2018); MLA for Bintong (2018–2022)	7 May 2013	22 November 2022	9 years, 200 days	BN (UMNO)	2018	14th
10		Mohd Shukri Ramli (born 1961); MLA for Sanglang	22 November 2022	25 December 2025	3 years, 34 days	PN (PAS)	2022	15th
11		Abu Bakar Hamzah (born 1968); MLA for Kuala Perlis	28 December 2025	Incumbent	254 days	PN (BERSATU)	–	15th
