= Bintong =

State constituency in Perlis, Malaysia

Bintong (N06)
Perlis constituency

State constituency
- Legislature: Perlis State Legislative Assembly
MLA
Vacant
- Constituency created: 1958
- First contested: 1959
- Last contested: 2022

Demographics
- Electors (2022): 16,366

Bintong is a state constituency in Perlis, Malaysia, that has been represented in the Perlis State Legislative Assembly.

The state constituency was first contested in 1958 and is mandated to return a single Assemblyman to the Perlis State Legislative Assembly under the first-past-the-post voting system. Since 2022, the State Assemblyman for Bintong is Fakhrul Anwar Ismail from Perikatan Nasional (PN).

== Definition ==
=== Polling districts ===
According to the federal gazette issued on 31 October 2022, the Bintong constituency is divided into 6 polling districts.

State constituency	Polling Districts	Code	Location
Bintong (N06)	Nesam	002/06/01	SK Padang Kota
Bintong (N06)	Abi	002/06/02	SK Abi
Bintong (N06)	Kechor	002/06/03	SR Islam 1
Bintong (N06)	Hutan Melintang	002/06/04	SK Behor Empiang
Bintong (N06)	Telok Kachang	002/06/05	SK Stella Maris
Bintong (N06)	Wang Bintong	002/06/06	SK Bintong

== Demographics ==
Ethnic breakdown of Bintong's electorate as of 2022
1. Malay (95.4%)
2. Chinese (2.99%)
3. Indian (1.01%)
4. Other ethnicities (0.59%)

Total electors by polling district in 2016
Polling district	Electors
Nesam	1,906
Abi	2,059
Kechor	724
Hutan Melintang	1,811
Telok Kachang	2,311
Wang Bintong	2,075
Total	10,886
Source: Malaysian Election Commission

=== History ===
Members of the Legislative Assembly for Bintong
Assembly	No	Years	Member	Party
Constituency created
1st	N06	1959–1964	Sheikh Ahmad Mohd Hashim	Alliance (UMNO)
2nd	N06	1964–1969	Syed Omar Syed Hussin	Alliance (UMNO)
		1969–1971	Assembly dissolved	
3rd	N06	1971–1973	Syed Omar Syed Hussin	Alliance (UMNO)
3rd	N06	1973–1974	Syed Omar Syed Hussin	BN (UMNO)
4th	N03	1974–1978	Jaafar Hassan	BN (UMNO)
5th	N03	1978–1982	Jaafar Hassan	BN (UMNO)
6th	N03	1982–1986	Shuib Mohamad	PAS
7th	N05	1986–1990	Md Isa Sabu	BN (UMNO)
8th	N05	1990–1995	Md Isa Sabu	BN (UMNO)
9th	N06	1995–1999	Sopiah Ahmad	BN (UMNO)
10th	N06	1999–2004	Md Isa Sabu	BN (UMNO)
11th	N06	2004–2008	Rusli Mat Husin	BN (UMNO)
12th	N06	2008–2013	Md Isa Sabu	BN (UMNO)
13th	N06	2013–2018	Rela Ahmad	BN (UMNO)
14th	N06	2018–2022	Azlan Man	BN (UMNO)
15th	N06	2022–2025	Fakhrul Anwar Ismail	PN (PAS)
15th	N06	2025	Fakhrul Anwar Ismail	Independent
15th	N06	2025–present	Vacant	

== Election results ==
Perlis state election, 2022: Bintong
Party	Candidate	Votes	%	∆%
PN	Fakhrul Anwar Ismail	7,325	57.58	▲57.58
BN	Azlan Man	2,996	23.55	▼17.04
PH	Azhari Ahmad	2,029	15.95	▲15.95
Independent	Hashim Suboh	157	1.52	▲1.52
PEJUANG	Shazwan Suban	157	1.52	▲1.52
Heritage	Mohamad Khair Mohd Noor	57	0.45	▲0.45
Total valid votes		12,721	100.00	
Total rejected ballots		172		
Unreturned ballots		33		
Turnout		12,926	78.98	▼3.95
Registered electors		16,366		
Majority		4,329	34.03	▲25.41
PN gain from BN		Swing		?

Perlis state election, 2018: Bintong
Party	Candidate	Votes	%	∆%
BN	Azlan Man	3,986	40.59	▼16.08
PKR	Mokhtar Che Kassim	3,139	31.97	▲31.97
PAS	Abd Jamil Kamis	2,695	27.44	▼15.89
Total valid votes		9,820	100.00	
Total rejected ballots		198		
Unreturned ballots		46		
Turnout		10,064	82.93	▼4.17
Registered electors		12,136		
Majority		847	8.63	▼4.71
BN hold		Swing		

Perlis state election, 2013: Bintong
Party	Candidate	Votes	%	∆%
BN	Rela Ahmad	5,255	56.67	▼7.11
PAS	Abd Jamil Kamis	4,018	43.33	▲7.11
Total valid votes		9,273	100.00	
Total rejected ballots		188		
Unreturned ballots		42		
Turnout		9,503	87.10	▲3.31
Registered electors		10,911		
Majority		1,237	13.34	▼14.23
BN hold		Swing		
Source(s) "Federal Government Gazette - Notice of Contested Election, State Legislative Assembly for the State of Perlis [P.U. (B) 185/2013]" (PDF). Attorney General's Chambers of Malaysia. 26 April 2013. "Federal Government Gazette - Results of Contested Election and Statements of the Poll after the Official Addition of Votes, State Constituencies for the State of Perlis [P.U. (B) 226/2013]" (PDF). Attorney General's Chambers of Malaysia. 22 May 2013.

Perlis state election, 2008: Bintong
Party	Candidate	Votes	%	∆%
BN	Md Isa Sabu	4,882	63.78	▲2.43
PAS	Mohd Anuar Mohd Tahir	2,772	36.22	▼2.43
Total valid votes		7,654	100.00	
Total rejected ballots		184		
Unreturned ballots		26		
Turnout		7,864	83.78	▼2.29
Registered electors		9,386		
Majority		2,110	27.57	▲4.87
BN hold		Swing		

Perlis state election, 2004: Bintong
Party	Candidate	Votes	%	∆%
BN	Rusli Mat Husin	4,076	61.35	▲8.91
PAS	Abdul Zakaria	2,568	38.65	▼8.91
Total valid votes		6,644	100.00	
Total rejected ballots		107		
Unreturned ballots		6		
Turnout		6,757	86.08	▲3.52
Registered electors		7,850		
Majority		1,508	22.70	▲17.81
BN hold		Swing		

Perlis state election, 1999: Bintong
Party	Candidate	Votes	%	∆%
BN	Md Isa Sabu	3,285	52.44	▼14.87
PAS	Abdul Zakaria	2,979	47.56	▲14.87
Total valid votes		6,264	100.00	
Total rejected ballots		135		
Unreturned ballots		0		
Turnout		6,399	82.56	▲5.19
Registered electors		7,751		
Majority		306	4.89	▼29.74
BN hold		Swing		

Perlis state election, 1995: Bintong
Party	Candidate	Votes	%	∆%
BN	Sopiah Ahmad	3,775	67.31	▼12.36
PAS	Mohamad Faisol Abd Rahman	1,833	32.69	▲12.36
Total valid votes		5,608	100.00	
Total rejected ballots		158		
Unreturned ballots		0		
Turnout		5,766	77.36	▲1.75
Registered electors		7,453		
Majority		1,942	34.63	▼24.90
BN hold		Swing		

Perlis state election, 1990: Bintong
Party	Candidate	Votes	%	∆%
BN	Md Isa Sabu	4,100	79.77	▲10.03
PAS	Murshid Mohamad	1,040	20.23	▼10.03
Total valid votes		5,140	100.00	
Total rejected ballots		204		
Unreturned ballots		6		
Turnout		5,350	75.62	▲1.56
Registered electors		7,075		
Majority		3,060	59.53	▲20.05
BN hold		Swing		

Perlis state election, 1986: Bintong
Party	Candidate	Votes	%	
BN	Md Isa Sabu	3,151	69.74	
PAS	Mohd Abidin Halifah	1,367	30.26	
Total valid votes		4,518	100.00	
Total rejected ballots		230		
Unreturned ballots		0		
Turnout		4,748	74.06	
Registered electors		6,411		
Majority		1,784	39.49	
BN gain from PAS		Swing		?

Perlis state election, 1982: Bintong
Party	Candidate	Votes	%	∆%
On the nomination day, Shuib Mohamad won uncontested.
PAS	Shuib Mohamad			
Total valid votes			100.00	
Total rejected ballots				
Unreturned ballots				
Turnout				
Registered electors		6,498		
Majority				
PAS gain from BN		Swing		?

Perlis state election, 1978: Bintong
Party	Candidate	Votes	%	∆%
BN	Jaafar Hassan	3,261	75.19	▼6.91
PAS	Ismail Baba	1,076	24.81	▲24.81
Total valid votes		4,337	100.00	
Total rejected ballots		281		
Unreturned ballots		0		
Turnout		4,618	80.65	▼2.82
Registered electors		5,726		
Majority		2,185	50.38	▼13.82
BN hold		Swing		

Perlis state election, 1974: Bintong
Party	Candidate	Votes	%	∆%
BN	Jaafar Hassan	3,114	82.10	▲82.10
Parti Rakyat Malaysia	Saad Ahmad	679	17.90	▲17.90
Total valid votes		3,793	100.00	
Total rejected ballots		331		
Unreturned ballots		0		
Turnout		4,124	83.46	▼1.60
Registered electors		4,941		
Majority		2,435	64.20	▲58.37
BN hold		Swing		?

Perlis state election, 1969: Bintong
Party	Candidate	Votes	%	∆%
Alliance	Syed Omar Syed Hussin	2,144	52.91	▼9.39
PMIP	Yusof Osman	1,908	47.09	▲9.39
Total valid votes		4,052	100.00	
Total rejected ballots		327		
Unreturned ballots		0		
Turnout		4,379	85.06	▼1.99
Registered electors		5,148		
Majority		236	5.82	▼18.77
Alliance hold		Swing		

Perlis state election, 1964: Bintong
Party	Candidate	Votes	%	∆%
Alliance	Syed Omar Syed Hussin	2,168	62.30	▼0.58
PMIP	Abdul Rahman Hamid	1,312	37.70	▲0.58
Total valid votes		3,480	100.00	
Total rejected ballots		211		
Unreturned ballots		0		
Turnout		3,691	87.05	▲2.50
Registered electors		4,240		
Majority		856	24.60	▼1.16
Alliance hold		Swing		

Perlis state election, 1959: Bintong
Party	Candidate	Votes	%
Alliance	Sheikh Ahmad Mohd Hashim	1,948	62.88
PMIP	Shaffie Omar	1,150	37.12
Total valid votes		3,098	100.00
Total rejected ballots		39	
Unreturned ballots		0	
Turnout		3,137	84.56
Registered electors		3,710	
Majority		798	25.76
This was a new constituency created.
