= Mohd Shukri Ramli =

Malaysian politician and teacher

Yang Berhormat Tuan Mohd Shukri Ramli PPA MLA
- محمّد شكري رملي

10th Menteri Besar of Perlis
- In office 22 November 2022 – 25 December 2025
- Monarch: Sirajuddin
- Preceded by: Azlan Man
- Succeeded by: Abu Bakar Hamzah
- Constituency: Sanglang

Member of the Perlis State Legislative Assembly for Sanglang
- Incumbent
- Assumed office 5 May 2013
- Preceded by: Hashim Jasin (PR–PAS)
- Majority: 121 (2013); 42 (2018); 3,335 (2022)

State Chairman of Perikatan Nasional of Perlis
- In office 5 January 2021 – 28 October 2025
- National Chairman: Muhyiddin Yassin
- Preceded by: Position established
- Succeeded by: Shahidan Kassim

State Commissioner of the Malaysian Islamic Party of Perlis
- In office 2013 – 16 September 2025
- President: Abdul Hadi Awang
- Preceded by: Hashim Jasin
- Succeeded by: Ahmad Ali

Other Positions
- 2013–2019: Deputy Speaker of the Perlis State Legislative Assembly

Faction represented in the Perlis State Legislative Assembly
- 2008–2020: Malaysian Islamic Party
- 2020–: Perikatan Nasional

Personal details
- Born: Mohd Shukri bin Ramli; 6 February 1961 (age 65) Kangar, Perlis, Federation of Malaya (now Malaysia)
- Party: Malaysian Islamic Party (PAS)
- Other political affiliations: Pakatan Rakyat (PR) (2008–2015); Gagasan Sejahtera (GS) (2016–2020); Perikatan Nasional (PN) (since 2020)
- Spouse: Najwa Othman
- Relations: Abdul Hadi Awang (affinal)
- Children: 6
- Education: IPG Kampus Rajang
- Occupation: Politician
- Profession: Teacher

Mohd Shukri bin Ramli (born 6 February 1961) is a Malaysian politician and teacher who has served as Member of the Perlis State Legislative Assembly for Sanglang since May 2013. He was the 10th Menteri Besar of Perlis from November 2022 to his resignation in December 2025. He is a member of the Malaysian Islamic Party (PAS), a component party of the Perikatan Nasional (PN) coalition.

== Political career ==
He served as Deputy Speaker of the Assembly from 2013 to 2019. He has also served as the State Chairman of PN of Perlis from January 2021 until October 2025 and the State Commissioner of PAS of Perlis from 2013 until September 2025.

On 22 December 2025, eight MLAs pulled their support of him being Perlis MB. He resigned days later citing health conditions.

== Controversies and issues ==
On 30 April 2024, Mohd Shukri was detained by the Malaysian Anti-Corruption Commission.

== Election results ==
Perlis State Legislative Assembly
Year	Constituency	Candidate	Votes	Pct	Opponent(s)	Votes	Pct	Ballots cast	Majority	Turnout
2013	N15 Sanglang	Mohd Shukri Ramli (PAS)	3,632	49.31%	Fathul Bari Mat Jahya (UMNO)	3,511	47.67%	7,459	121	89.21%
2013	N15 Sanglang	Mohd Shukri Ramli (PAS)	3,632	49.31%	Zainudin Yom (IND)	222	3.01%	7,459	121	89.21%
2018	N15 Sanglang	Mohd Shukri Ramli (PAS)	2,971	40.82%	Che Zaidi Saidin (UMNO)	2,929	40.24%	7,408	42	85.42%
2018	N15 Sanglang	Mohd Shukri Ramli (PAS)	2,971	40.82%	Zolkarnain Abidin (AMANAH)	1,379	18.94%	7,408	42	85.42%
2022	N15 Sanglang	Mohd Shukri Ramli (PAS)	5,111	62.13%	Sharipudin Ahmad (UMNO)	1,776	21.59%	8,226	3,335	78.94%
2022	N15 Sanglang	Mohd Shukri Ramli (PAS)	5,111	62.13%	Ahmad Fadhzil Mohamad (AMANAH)	931	11.32%	8,226	3,335	78.94%
2022	N15 Sanglang	Mohd Shukri Ramli (PAS)	5,111	62.13%	Zainudin Yom (WARISAN)	408	4.96%	8,226	3,335	78.94%

== Honours ==
- Malaysia
  - Recipient of the General Service Medal (PPA)
  - Recipient of the 17th Yang di-Pertuan Agong Installation Medal (2025)
- Perlis
  - Recipient of Tuanku Syed Sirajuddin Jamalullail Silver Jubilee Medal (2025)
