= Pauh =

State constituency in Perlis, Malaysia

Pauh (N11)
Perlis constituency

State constituency
- Legislature: Perlis State Legislative Assembly
MLA
Megat Hashirat Hassan
PN
- Constituency created: 1994
- First contested: 1995
- Last contested: 2022

Demographics
- Population (2020): 39,618
- Electors (2022): 14,797

Pauh is a state constituency in Perlis, Malaysia, that has been represented in the Perlis State Legislative Assembly.

The state constituency was created in 1994. It was first contested in 1995 and is mandated to return a single Assemblyman to the Perlis State Legislative Assembly under the first-past-the-post voting system. Since 2022, the State Assemblyman for Pauh is Megat Hashirat Hassan from Perikatan Nasional (PN).

== Definition ==
=== Polling districts ===
According to the federal gazette issued on 31 October 2022, the Pauh constituency is divided into 6 polling districts.

State constituency	Polling Districts	Code	Location
Pauh (N11)	Guar Gajah	003/11/01	SMK Dato' Sheikh Ahmad; SMA Arau
Pauh (N11)	Padang Siding	003/11/02	SK Pauh
Pauh (N11)	Pauh	003/11/03	SMK Tengku Budriah
Pauh (N11)	Istana	003/11/04	SK Tengku Budriah
Pauh (N11)	Pekan Arau	003/11/05	SJK (C) Hwa Aik
Pauh (N11)	Kubang Paya	003/11/06	SJK (C) Sin Min

== Demographics ==
Ethnic breakdown of Pauh's electorate as of 2022
1. Malays (77.7%)
2. Chinese (14.5%)
3. Indians (5.33%)
4. Other Ethnicities (2.46%)

Total electors by polling district in 2016
Polling district	Electors
Guar Gajah	2,991
Padang Siding	1,079
Pauh	2,555
Istana	934
Pekan Arau	918
Kubang Paya	1,321
Total	9,798
Source: Malaysian Election Commission

== History ==
Members of the Legislative Assembly for Pauh
Assembly	No	Years	Member	Party
Constituency created from Guar Sanji
9th	N11	1995–1999	Abdul Azib Saad	BN (UMNO)
10th	N11	1999–2004	Abu Bakar Ismail	BN (UMNO)
11th	N11	2004–2008	Abu Bakar Ismail	BN (UMNO)
12th	N11	2008–2013	Syed Razlan Tuanku Syed Putra Jamalullail	BN (UMNO)
13th	N11	2013–2018	Azlan Man	BN (UMNO)
14th	N11	2018–2022	Rozieana Ahmad	BN (UMNO)
15th	N11	2022–present	Megat Hashirat Hassan	PN (BERSATU)

== Election results ==
Perlis state election, 2022: Pauh
Party	Candidate	Votes	%	∆%
PN	Megat Hashirat Hassan	4,924	44.18	▲44.18
BN	Syed Atif Syed Abu Bakar	2,695	24.18	▼15.11
PH	Azhar Ameir	2,369	21.26	▲21.26
Heritage	Mohd Khalid Ahmad	1,157	10.38	▲10.38
Total valid votes		11,145	100.00	
Total rejected ballots		169		
Unreturned ballots		20		
Turnout		11,334	76.60	▼6.53
Registered electors		14,797		
Majority		2,229	20.00	▲18.43
PN gain from BN		Swing		?

Perlis state election, 2018: Pauh
Party	Candidate	Votes	%	∆%
BN	Rozieana Ahmad	3,564	39.29	▼19.18
PKR	Amier Hassan	3,421	37.72	▲37.72
PAS	Idris Yaacob	2,085	21.57	▼19.96
Total valid votes		9,070	100.00	
Total rejected ballots		196		
Unreturned ballots		36		
Turnout		9,310	83.13	▼3.73
Registered electors		11,200		
Majority		143	1.57	▼15.37
BN hold		Swing		

Perlis state election, 2013: Pauh
Party	Candidate	Votes	%	∆%
BN	Azlan Man	4,769	58.47	▼11.78
PAS	Idris Yaacob	3,387	41.53	▲11.78
Total valid votes		8,156	100.00	
Total rejected ballots		158		
Unreturned ballots		19		
Turnout		8,333	86.86	▲6.35
Registered electors		9,594		
Majority		1,382	16.94	▼23.56
BN hold		Swing		
Source(s) "Federal Government Gazette - Notice of Contested Election, State Legislative Assembly for the State of Perlis [P.U. (B) 185/2013]" (PDF). Attorney General's Chambers of Malaysia. 26 April 2013. "Federal Government Gazette - Results of Contested Election and Statements of the Poll after the Official Addition of Votes, State Constituencies for the State of Perlis [P.U. (B) 226/2013]" (PDF). Attorney General's Chambers of Malaysia. 22 May 2013.

Perlis state election, 2008: Pauh
Party	Candidate	Votes	%	∆%
BN	Syed Razlan Syed Putra Jamalullail	4,461	70.25	▲7.05
PAS	Abu Bakar Ali	1,889	29.75	▼7.05
Total valid votes		6,350	100.00	
Total rejected ballots		132		
Unreturned ballots		45		
Turnout		6,527	80.51	▼0.85
Registered electors		8,107		
Majority		2,572	40.50	▲14.10
BN hold		Swing		

Perlis state election, 2004: Pauh
Party	Candidate	Votes	%	∆%
BN	Abu Bakar Ismail	3,795	63.20	▼1.54
PAS	Abu Bakar Ali	2,210	36.80	▲36.80
Total valid votes		6,005	100.00	
Total rejected ballots		179		
Unreturned ballots		0		
Turnout		6,184	81.36	▲1.46
Registered electors		7,601		
Majority		1,585	26.40	▼3.08
BN hold		Swing		

Perlis state election, 1999: Pauh
Party	Candidate	Votes	%	∆%
BN	Abu Bakar Ismail	3,653	64.74	▼12.46
PKR	Zulmi Sabri	1,990	35.26	▲35.26
Total valid votes		5,643	100.00	
Total rejected ballots		172		
Unreturned ballots		45		
Turnout		5,860	79.90	▲4.27
Registered electors		7,334		
Majority		1,663	29.48	▼24.92
BN hold		Swing		

Perlis state election, 1995: Pauh
Party	Candidate	Votes	%
BN	Abdul Aziz Saad	4,054	77.20
PAS	Ismail Ahmad	1,197	22.80
Total valid votes		5,251	100.00
Total rejected ballots		115	
Unreturned ballots		19	
Turnout		5,385	75.63
Registered electors		7,120	
Majority		2,857	54.40
This was a new constituency created.
