= Tambun Tulang =

State constituency in Perlis, Malaysia

Tambun Tulang (N12)
Perlis constituency

State constituency
- Legislature: Perlis State Legislative Assembly
MLA
Wan Zikri Afthar Ishak
PN
- Constituency created: 1994
- First contested: 1995
- Last contested: 2022

Demographics
- Electors (2022): 13,451

Tambun Tulang is a state constituency in Perlis, Malaysia, that has been represented in the Perlis State Legislative Assembly. It has been represented by Member of the State Executive Council (EXCO) Wan Zikri Afthar Ishak since 2022.

The state constituency was created in 1994. It was first contested in 1995 and is mandated to return a single Assemblyman to the Perlis State Legislative Assembly under the first-past-the-post voting system.

== Definition ==
=== Polling districts ===
According to the federal gazette issued on 31 October 2022, the Tambun Tulang constituency is divided into 6 polling districts.

State constituency	Polling Districts	Code	Location
Tambun Tulang (N12)	Kubang Gajah	003/12/01	SK Kubang Gajah
Tambun Tulang (N12)	Jejawi	003/12/02	SMK Syed Sirajuddin
Tambun Tulang (N12)	Kampong Banat	003/12/03	SMK Syed Hussien
Tambun Tulang (N12)	Kampong Surau	003/12/04	SK Utan Aji
Tambun Tulang (N12)	Mengkuang Layar	003/12/05	SK Long Boh
Tambun Tulang (N12)	Tambun Tulang	003/12/06	SK Tambun Tulang

== Demographics ==
Ethnic breakdown of Tambun Tulang's electorate as of 2022
1. Malays (82.7%)
2. Other Ethnicities (11.3%)
3. Chinese (5.22%)
4. Indians (0.69%)

Total electors by polling district in 2016
Polling district	Electors
Kubang Gajah	1,692
Jejawi	1,493
Kampung Banat	1,024
Kampong Surau	2,160
Mengkuang Layar	1,038
Tambun Tulang	2,344
Total	9,751
Source: Malaysian Election Commission

== History ==
Members of the Legislative Assembly for Tambun Tulang
Assembly	No	Years	Member	Party
Constituency created from Utan Aji and Kota Raja
9th	N12	1995–1999	Shahidan Kassim	BN (UMNO)
10th	N12	1999–2004	Shahidan Kassim	BN (UMNO)
11th	N12	2004–2008	Shahidan Kassim	BN (UMNO)
12th	N12	2008–2013	Shahidan Kassim	BN (UMNO)
13th	N12	2013–2018	Ismail Kassim	BN (UMNO)
14th	N12	2018–2019	Ismail Kassim	BN (UMNO)
14th	N12	2019–2020	Ismail Kassim	PH (BERSATU)
14th	N12	2020–2022	Ismail Kassim	BN (UMNO)
15th	N12	2022–present	Wan Zikri Afthar Ishak	PN (BERSATU)

== Election results ==
Perlis state election, 2022: Tambun Tulang
Party	Candidate	Votes	%	∆%
PN	Wan Zikri Afthar Ishak	5,456	53.68	▲53.68
BN	Ismail Kasim	2,971	29.23	▼8.77
PH	Syahmi Suhaimi	1,554	15.29	▲15.29
PEJUANG	Maton Din	182	1.79	▲1.79
Total valid votes		10,163	100.00	
Total rejected ballots		225		
Unreturned ballots		122		
Turnout		10,510	78.10	▼6.52
Registered electors		13,451		
Majority		2,485	24.45	▲13.25
PN gain from BN		Swing		?

Perlis state election, 2018: Tambun Tulang
Party	Candidate	Votes	%	∆%
BN	Ismail Kassim	4,005	38.00	▼27.33
PKR	Maton Din	2,825	26.80	▼7.87
PAS	Abu Bakar Ali	1,910	18.10	▲18.10
Total valid votes		8,740	100.00	
Total rejected ballots		148		
Unreturned ballots		27		
Turnout		8,915	84.62	▼3.03
Registered electors		10,535		
Majority		1,180	11.20	▼19.46
BN hold		Swing		

Perlis state election, 2013: Tambun Tulang
Party	Candidate	Votes	%	∆%
BN	Ismail Kassim	5,286	65.33	▲0.40
PKR	Azhar Ameir	2,805	34.67	▲34.67
Total valid votes		8,091	100.00	
Total rejected ballots		153		
Unreturned ballots		16		
Turnout		8,260	87.65	▲8.51
Registered electors		9,424		
Majority		2,481	30.66	▲0.80
BN hold		Swing		
Source(s) "Federal Government Gazette - Notice of Contested Election, State Legislative Assembly for the State of Perlis [P.U. (B) 185/2013]" (PDF). Attorney General's Chambers of Malaysia. 26 April 2013. "Federal Government Gazette - Results of Contested Election and Statements of the Poll after the Official Addition of Votes, State Constituencies for the State of Perlis [P.U. (B) 226/2013]" (PDF). Attorney General's Chambers of Malaysia. 22 May 2013.

Perlis state election, 2008: Tambun Tulang
Party	Candidate	Votes	%	∆%
BN	Shahidan Kassim	4,371	64.93	▲2.67
PAS	Che Nordin Che Ahmad	2,361	35.07	▼2.67
Total valid votes		6,732	100.00	
Total rejected ballots		138		
Unreturned ballots		2		
Turnout		6,872	79.14	▼6.19
Registered electors		8,683		
Majority		2,010	29.86	▲5.34
BN hold		Swing		

Perlis state election, 2004: Tambun Tulang
Party	Candidate	Votes	%	∆%
BN	Shahidan Kassim	4,422	62.26	▲5.01
PAS	Haron Din	2,680	37.74	▼5.01
Total valid votes		7,102	100.00	
Total rejected ballots		101		
Unreturned ballots		5		
Turnout		7,208	85.33	▲2.61
Registered electors		8,447		
Majority		1,742	24.52	▲10.02
BN hold		Swing		

Perlis state election, 1999: Tambun Tulang
Party	Candidate	Votes	%	∆%
BN	Shahidan Kassim	3,464	57.25	▼12.21
PAS	Ismail Ahmad	2,587	42.75	▲42.75
Total valid votes		6,051	100.00	
Total rejected ballots		124		
Unreturned ballots		2		
Turnout		6,177	82.72	▲5.32
Registered electors		7,467		
Majority		877	14.50	▼24.42
BN hold		Swing		

Perlis state election, 1995: Tambun Tulang
Party	Candidate	Votes	%
BN	Shahidan Kassim	3,777	69.46
S46	Alias Othman	1,661	30.54
Total valid votes		5,438	100.00
Total rejected ballots		139	
Unreturned ballots		2	
Turnout		5,579	77.40
Registered electors		7,208	
Majority		2,116	38.92
This was a new constituency created.
