= Wan Kharizal Wan Khazim =

Malaysian politician (born 1962)

State Chairman of the National Trust Party of Perlis
- Incumbent
- Assumed office 2015
- Preceded by: new position

Personal details
- Born: 21 September 1962 (age 63) Chuping, Perlis
- Party: Malaysian Islamic Party (PAS) (−2015); National Trust Party (AMANAH) (2015–present)
- Occupation: Politician

Wan Kharizal bin Wan Khazim (born 21 September 1962) is a Malaysian politician who served as State AMANAH Chairman of Perlis since 2015. He was appointed as a member of board of directors of the National Farmer's Organisation (NAFAS) in 2019.

== Election results ==
Perlis State Legislative Assembly
Year	Constituency	Candidate	Votes	Pct	Opponent(s)	Votes	Pct	Ballots cast	Majority	Turnout
1999	N03 Chuping	Wan Kharizal Wan Khazim (PAS)	2,496	39.92%	Yazid Mat (UMNO)	3,756	60.08%	6,399	1,260	85.31%
2008	N04 Mata Ayer	Wan Kharizal Wan Khazim (PAS)	1,437	31.96%	Khairi Hasan (UMNO)	3,059	68.04%	4,662	1,622	84.05%
2013	N02 Beseri	Wan Kharizal Wan Khazim (PAS)	3,096	45.99%	Mat Rawi Kassim (UMNO)	3,636	54.01%	6,847	540	83.53%
2018	N02 Beseri	Wan Kharizal Wan Khazim (AMANAH)	2,463	35.88%	Ruzaini Rais (UMNO)	2,879	41.95%	7,027	416	78.83%
2018	N02 Beseri	Wan Kharizal Wan Khazim (AMANAH)	2,463	35.88%	Azamhari Mohamood (PAS)	1,523	22.18%	7,027	416	78.83%
2022	N10 Kayang	Wan Kharizal Wan Khazim (AMANAH)	1,400	13.21%	Asrul Aimran Abd Jalil (PAS)	6,178	58.31%	10,744	3,261	79.93%
2022	N10 Kayang	Wan Kharizal Wan Khazim (AMANAH)	1,400	13.21%	Hamizan Hassan (UMNO)	2,917	27.53%	10,744	3,261	79.93%
2022	N10 Kayang	Wan Kharizal Wan Khazim (AMANAH)	1,400	13.21%	Khairuddin Abdullah (WARISAN)	101	0.95%	10,744	3,261	79.93%

Parliament of Malaysia
Year	Constituency	Candidate	Votes	Pct	Opponent(s)	Votes	Pct	Ballots cast	Majority	Turnout
2004	P001 Padang Besar	Wan Kharizal Wan Khazim (PAS)	9,058	33.08%	Azmi Khalid (UMNO)	18,323	66.92%	28,453	9,265	83.93%
