= Padang Besar (federal constituency) =

Federal constituency of Perlis, Malaysia

Padang Besar (P001)
Perlis constituency

Federal constituency
- Legislature: Dewan Rakyat
- MP: Rushdan Rusmi; PN
- Constituency created: 1994
- First contested: 1995
- Last contested: 2022

Demographics
- Population (2020): 86,798
- Electors (2022): 60,192
- Area (km²): 450
- Pop. density (per km²): 192.9

Padang Besar is a federal constituency in Perlis, Malaysia, that has been represented in the Dewan Rakyat since 1995.

The federal constituency was created from parts of the Kangar constituency in the 1994 redistribution and is mandated to return a single member to the Dewan Rakyat under the first past the post voting system.

== Demographics ==
Ethnic breakdown of Padang Besar's electorate as of 2022
1. Malay (86.7%)
2. Chinese (8.38%)
3. Other ethnicities (2.97%)
4. Indian (1.99%)

As of 2020, Padang Besar has a population of 86,798 people.

Age breakdown of Padang Besar's electorate as of 2022
1. 18-20 (5.92%)
2. 21-29 (21.4%)
3. 30-39 (24.9%)
4. 40-49 (16.1%)
5. 50-59 (12.7%)
6. 60-69 (10.8%)
7. 70-79 (6.04%)
8. 80-89 (1.87%)
9. above 90 (0.35%)
Gender breakdown of Padang Besar's electorate as of 2022
1. Male (50.2%)
2. Female (49.8%)

== History ==
=== Polling districts ===
According to the federal gazette issued on 31 October 2022, the Padang Besar constituency is divided into 27 polling districts.

State constituency	Polling Districts	Code	Location
Titi Tinggi (N01)	Jalan Padang Besar	001/01/01	SMK Raja Puan Muda Tengku Fauziah
Titi Tinggi (N01)	Titi Tinggi	001/01/02	SK Titi Tinggi
Titi Tinggi (N01)	FELDA Mata Ayer	001/01/03	SK (FELDA) Mata Ayer
Titi Tinggi (N01)	Kampong Kastam	001/01/04	SK Padang Besar Utara
Titi Tinggi (N01)	Padang Besar	001/01/05	SMK Padang Besar Utara
Titi Tinggi (N01)	FELDA Rimba Mas	001/01/06	SK (FELDA) Rimba Mas
Titi Tinggi (N01)	Lubok Sireh	001/01/07	SK Lubok Sireh
Beseri（N02）	Pekan Kaki Bukit	001/02/01	SJK (C) Kong Hwa
Beseri（N02）	Tasoh	001/02/02	Kem Tasoh Pusat Ko-Kurikulum JPN Perlis
Beseri（N02）	Guar Jentik	001/02/03	SK Guar Jentik
Beseri（N02）	Beseri	001/02/04	SK Beseri
Beseri（N02）	Tunjong	001/02/05	SMK Tengku Sulaiman
Chuping（N03）	Panggas	001/03/01	SMK Datuk Jaafar Hasan
Chuping（N03）	Sungai Buloh	001/03/02	SK Batu Bertangkup
Chuping（N03）	Kilang Gula Chuping	001/03/03	SR Islam III
Chuping（N03）	Kubang Perun	001/03/04	SMK Guar Nangka
Chuping（N03）	Guar Nangka	001/03/05	SK Guar Nangka
Chuping（N03）	FELDA Chuping	001/03/06	SK (FELDA) Chuping
Mata Ayer（N04）	Tok Kaya Man	001/04/01	SK Dato Kayaman
Mata Ayer（N04）	Hutan Temin	001/04/02	SK Oran
Mata Ayer（N04）	Kampung Gial	001/04/03	SJK (C) Kong Aik
Santan（N05）	Kampong Darat	001/05/01	SK Seri Tunjong
Santan（N05）	Paya	001/05/02	SK Paya
Santan（N05）	Alor Tampang	001/05/03	Pusat Kegiatan (Kemas) Alor Tampang
Santan（N05）	Padang Lati	001/05/04	Dewan Seri Melati Beseri
Santan（N05）	Padang Pauh	001/05/05	SMK Abi
Santan（N05）	Santan	001/05/06	SK Santan

=== Representation history ===
Members of Parliament for Padang Besar
Parliament	No	Years	Member	Party	Vote
Constituency created from Kangar
9th	P001	1995–1999	Azmi Khalid (عزمي خالد)	BN (UMNO)	17,013; 71.02%
10th	P001	1999–2004	Azmi Khalid (عزمي خالد)	BN (UMNO)	14,386; 59.32%
11th	P001	2004–2008	Azmi Khalid (عزمي خالد)	BN (UMNO)	18,323; 66.92%
12th	P001	2008–2013	Azmi Khalid (عزمي خالد)	BN (UMNO)	16,991; 59.34%
13th	P001	2013–2018	Zahidi Zainul Abidin (زاهدي زاين العابدين)	BN (UMNO)	21,473; 60.45%
14th	P001	2018–2022	Zahidi Zainul Abidin (زاهدي زاين العابدين)	BN (UMNO)	15,032; 41.18%
15th	P001	2022–present	Rushdan Rusmi (رشدان روسمي)	PN (PAS)	24,267; 53.58%

=== State constituency ===
Parliamentary constituency	State constituency						
Parliamentary constituency	1955–1959*	1959–1974	1974–1986	1986–1995	1995–2004	2004–2018	2018–present
Padang Besar					Beseri		
Padang Besar					Chuping		
Padang Besar					Mata Ayer		
Padang Besar					Santan		
Padang Besar					Titi Tinggi		

=== Historical boundaries ===
State Constituency	Area		
State Constituency	1994	2003	2018
Beseri	Beseri; Kaki Bukit; Kampung Alor Kangar; Kampung Bukit Manik; Wang Kelian		
Chuping	FELDA Chuping; Kampung Perit; Kampung Bukit Jernih; Kubang Tiga; Pekan Chuping		
Mata Ayer	Kampung Gial; Kampung Guar Nangka; Kampung Satan; Mata Ayer; Tok Kaya Man		
Santan	Kampung Paya; Kampung Titi Teras; Padang Lati; Padang Melangit; Padang Pauh		
Titi Tinggi	FELCRA Lubuk Sireh; FELDA Mata Air; FELDA Rimba Mas; Padang Besar; Titi Tinggi		

=== Current state assembly members ===
No.	State Constituency	Member	Coalition (Party)
N01	Titi Tinggi	Izizam Ibrahim	PN (BERSATU)
N02	Beseri	Haziq Asyraf Dun	PN (PAS)
N03	Chuping	Vacant	
N04	Mata Ayer	Vacant	
N05	Santan	Mohammad Azmir Azizan	PN (PAS)

=== Local governments & postcodes ===
No.	Local Government	Postcode
P001	Kangar Municipal Council	01000, 02400, 02450, 02500 Kangar; 02100 Padang Besar; 02200 Kaki Bukit

== Election results ==
Malaysian general election, 2022
Party	Candidate	Votes	%	∆%
PN	Rushdan Rusmi	24,267	53.58	▲53.58
BN	Zahida Zarik Khan	11,753	25.95	▼19.23
PH	Mohamad Yahaya	7,085	15.64	▲15.64
Independent	Zahidi Zainul Abidin	1,939	1.56	▲1.56
Heritage	Ko Chu Liang	244	0.54	▲0.54
Total valid votes		45,288	100.00	
Total rejected ballots		693		
Unreturned ballots		78		
Turnout		46,059	76.52	▼4.68
Registered electors		60,192		
Majority		12,514	27.63	▲23.69
PN gain from BN		Swing		?
Source(s) https://lom.agc.gov.my/ilims/upload/portal/akta/outputp/1753257/PUB605.pdf

Malaysian general election, 2018
Party	Candidate	Votes	%	∆%
BN	Zahidi Zainul Abidin	15,032	41.18	▼19.27
PKR	Izizam Ibrahim	13,594	37.24	▲37.24
PAS	Mokhtar Senik	7,874	21.57	▼17.98
Total valid votes		36,500	100.00	
Total rejected ballots		780		
Unreturned ballots		152		
Turnout		37,432	81.20	
Registered electors		46,096		
Majority		1,438	3.94	
BN hold		Swing		▼28.26
Source(s) "His Majesty's Government Gazette - Notice of Contested Election, Parliament for the State of Perlis [P.U. (B) 232/2018]" (PDF). Attorney General's Chambers of Malaysia. 3 May 2018. "Federal Government Gazette - Results of Contested Election and Statements of the Poll after the Official Addition of Votes, Parliamentary Constituencies for the State of Perlis [P.U. (B) 306/2018]" (PDF). Attorney General's Chambers of Malaysia. 28 May 2018.

Malaysian general election, 2013
Party	Candidate	Votes	%	∆%
BN	Zahidi Zainul Abidin	21,473	60.45	▲1.11
PAS	Azamhari Mohamood	14,047	39.55	▼1.11
Total valid votes		35,520	100.00	
Total rejected ballots		531		
Unreturned ballots		91		
Turnout		36,142	86.11	
Registered electors		41,974		
Majority		7,426	20.9	
BN hold		Swing		▲1.11
Source(s) "Federal Government Gazette - Notice of Contested Election, Parliament for the State of Perlis [P.U. (B) 169/2013]" (PDF). Attorney General's Chambers of Malaysia. 26 April 2013. Archived from the original (PDF) on 2019-12-29. "Federal Government Gazette - Results of Contested Election and Statements of the Poll after the Official Addition of Votes, Parliamentary Constituencies for the State of Perlis [P.U. (B) 210/2013]" (PDF). Attorney General's Chambers of Malaysia. 22 May 2013.

Malaysian general election, 2008
Party	Candidate	Votes	%	∆%
BN	Baseri @ Azmi Khalid	16,991	59.34	▼7.58
PAS	Zolkharnain Abidin	11,643	40.66	▲7.58
Total valid votes		28,634	100.00	
Total rejected ballots		674		
Unreturned ballots		2		
Turnout		29,310	80.05	
Registered electors		36,613		
Majority		5,348	18.68	
BN hold		Swing		▼7.58

Malaysian general election, 2004
Party	Candidate	Votes	%	∆%
BN	Baseri @ Azmi Khalid	18,323	66.92	▲7.60
PAS	Wan Kharizal Wan Khazim	9,058	33.08	▲33.08
Total valid votes		27,381	100.00	
Total rejected ballots		672		
Unreturned ballots		400		
Turnout		28,453	83.93	
Registered electors		33,899		
Majority		9,265	33.84	
BN hold		Swing		▼12.74

Malaysian general election, 1999
Party	Candidate	Votes	%	∆%
BN	Baseri @ Azmi Khalid	14,386	59.32	▼11.70
PKR	Mohd Anuar Mohd Tahir	9,867	40.68	▲40.68
Total valid votes		24,253	100.00	
Total rejected ballots		441		
Unreturned ballots		653		
Turnout		25,347	78.04	
Registered electors		32,748		
Majority		4,519	18.64	
BN hold		Swing		▼26.19

Malaysian general election, 1995
Party	Candidate	Votes	%
BN	Baseri @ Azmi Khalid	17,013	71.02
PAS	Hisharudin Hasan	6,943	28.98
Total valid votes		23,956	100.00
Total rejected ballots		1,083	
Unreturned ballots		815	
Turnout		25,854	77.65
Registered electors		33,295	
Majority		10,070	42.04
This was a new constituency.
