= Asrul Aimran Abd Jalil =

Malaysian politician

Yang Berhormat Tuan Asrul Aimran Abd Jalil MLA
- عصرالعمران عبدالجليل

Member of the Perlis State Executive Council
- In office 25 November 2024 – 25 December 2025 (Housing, Local Government, Information and Digital)
- Monarch: Sirajuddin
- Menteri Besar: Mohd Shukri Ramli
- Preceded by: Himself (Housing, Local Government); Mohammad Azmir Azizan (Information Technology and Communication)
- Succeeded by: TBA
- In office 16 November 2023 – 25 November 2024 (Housing, Local Government, Human Resource Development and Poverty Eradication)
- Monarch: Sirajuddin
- Menteri Besar: Mohd Shukri Ramli
- Preceded by: Fakhrul Anwar Ismail (Housing, Local Government)
- Succeeded by: Himself (Housing, Local Government; Mohammad Azmir Azizan (Human Resource Development); Portfolio abolished (Poverty Eradication)

Member of the Perlis State Legislative Assembly for Kayang
- Incumbent
- Assumed office 19 November 2022
- Preceded by: Hamizan Hassan (BN–UMNO)
- Majority: 3,261 (2022)

State Youth Chief of the Malaysian Islamic Party of Perlis
- In office 2021–2023
- President: Abdul Hadi Awang
- State Commissioner: Mohd Shukri Ramli
- Preceded by: Mohammad Azmir Azizan
- Succeeded by: Haziq Asyraf Dun

Personal details
- Born: Asrul Aimran bin Abd Jalil; 11 May 1983 (age 43) Perlis, Malaysia
- Party: Malaysian Islamic Party (PAS)
- Other political affiliations: Perikatan Nasional (PN)
- Relatives: Asrul Nizan Abd Jalil (elder brother)
- Occupation: Politician

Asrul Aimran bin Abd Jalil (born 11 May 1983) is a Malaysian politician who has served as Member of the Perlis State Legislative Assembly (MLA) for Kayang since November 2022. He served as Member of the Perlis State Executive Council (EXCO) in the Perikatan Nasional (PN) state administration under Menteri Besar Mohd Shukri Ramli from November 2023 to December 2025. He is a member of Malaysian Islamic Party (PAS), a component party of the Perikatan Nasional (PN) coalition. He served as the State Youth Chief of PAS of Perlis from 2021 to 2023. He is the younger brother of Asrul Nizan Abd Jalil, the former State Leader of the Opposition of Perlis and former MLA for Sena. They are opposing politically as both of them are in opposing political sides, with himself from PN while his elder brother is from PH.

== Political career ==
=== Candidate for the Perlis State Legislative Assembly (2022) ===
In the 2022 state election, Asrul Aimran Abd Jalil made his electoral debut after being nominated by PN to contest for the Kayang state seat. Asrul Aimran is contesting against Hamizan Hassan of Barisan Nasional, Wan Kharizal Wan Khazim of Pakatan Harapan and Khairuddin Abdullah of Sabah Heritage Party. He won the seat by gaining 6,178 votes with the majority of 3,261.

=== Member of the Perlis State Executive Council (2023) ===
On 16 November 2023, the Perlis EXCO was reshuffled, Asrul Aimran Abd Jalil was appointed by Menteri Besar Mohd Shukri and taken over by Fakhrul Anwar Ismail during the reshuffle as the EXCO Member in charge of Housing, Local Government, Human Resource Development and Poverty Eradication.

On 25 November 2024, the Perlis EXCO was reshuffled, Asrul Aimran was in charge of Housing, Local Government, Information and Digital by Menteri Besar Mohd Shukri.

== Election results ==
Perlis State Legislative Assembly
Year	Constituency	Candidate	Votes	Pct	Opponent(s)	Votes	Pct	Ballots cast	Majority	Turnout
2022	N10 Kayang	Asrul Aimran Abd Jalil (PAS)	6,178	58.31%	Hamizan Hassan (UMNO)	2,917	27.53%	10,744	3,261	79.9%
2022	N10 Kayang	Asrul Aimran Abd Jalil (PAS)	6,178	58.31%	Wan Kharizal Wan Khazim (AMANAH)	1,400	13.21%	10,744	3,261	79.9%
2022	N10 Kayang	Asrul Aimran Abd Jalil (PAS)	6,178	58.31%	Khairuddin Abdullah (WARISAN)	101	0.95%	10,744	3,261	79.9%

== Honours ==
- Perlis
  - Recipient of Tuanku Syed Sirajuddin Jamalullail Silver Jubilee Medal (2025)
