= Megat Hashirat Hassan =

Malaysian politician

Yang Berhormat Tuan Megat Hashirat Hassan MLA

Member of the Perlis State Executive Council (Science, Technology, Innovation, Information Technology, Communication, Environment, Biotechnology, Green Technology, Social Unity and Health)
- In office 25 November 2022 – 25 November 2024
- Monarch: Sirajuddin
- Menteri Besar: Mohd Shukri Ramli
- Preceded by: Rozieana Ahmad (Science, Technology, Innovation, Information Technology and Communication); Teh Chai Aan (Environment, Biotechnology, Green Technology and Health); Siti Berenee Yahaya (Social Unity)
- Constituency: Pauh

Member of the Perlis State Legislative Assembly for Pauh
- Incumbent
- Assumed office 19 November 2022
- Preceded by: Rozieana Ahmad (BN–UMNO)
- Majority: 2,229 (2022)

Faction represented in Perlis State Legislative Assembly
- 2022–: Perikatan Nasional

Personal details
- Born: Megat Hashirat bin Hassan
- Citizenship: Malaysian
- Party: Malaysian United Indigenous Party (BERSATU)
- Other political affiliations: Perikatan Nasional (PN)
- Education: Pulau Nyior National Secondary School; Alor Setar Technical Secondary School
- Alma mater: Cheras Teaching Technical College; University of Technology Malaysia; Northern University of Malaysia
- Occupation: Politician
- Profession: Teacher

Tuan Megat Hashirat bin Hassan is a Malaysian politician and teacher who has served as Member of the Perlis State Executive Council (EXCO) in the Perikatan Nasional (PN) state administration under Menteri Besar Mohd Shukri Ramli as well as Member of the Perlis State Legislative Assembly (MLA) for Pauh since November 2022. He is a member of the Malaysian United Indigenous Party (BERSATU), a component party of the coalition. He is the Acting Division Chief and Division Deputy Chief of BERSATU of Arau, State Information Chief of BERSATU of Perlis and Deputy Information Chief of PN of Arau. He is also presently one of the three BERSATU Perlis EXCO Members along with Izizam Ibrahim and Wan Zikri Afthar Ishak.

== Political career ==
=== Member of the Perlis State Executive Council (since 2022) ===
In the 2022 Perlis state election, the ruling BN suffered from huge defeat and wipeout in the assembly as none of its candidates won a state seat in the elections after losing all the 10 seats it previously held to PN. The elections ended 63-year rule of BN in the state, saw the first ever transition of power in the history of the state and replaced BN with PN as the ruling coalition and dominant political force in the state as PN won 14 out of 15 state seats and therefore two-thirds supermajority of the assembly. Therefore, State Chairman of PN of Perlis, State Commissioner of PAS of Perlis and Sanglang MLA Mohd Shukri replaced Azlan Man as the new and 10th Menteri Besar of Perlis and formed a new PN state administration on 22 November 2022. On 25 November 2022, Megat Hashirat was appointed as the Perlis State EXCO Member in charge of Science, Technology, Innovation, Information Technology, Communication, Environment, Biotechnology, Green Technology, Social Unity and Health.

=== Member of the Perlis State Legislative Assembly (since 2022) ===
==== 2022 Perlis state election ====
In the 2022 state election, Megat Hashirat made his electoral debut after being nominated by PN to contest for the Pauh state seat. He won the seat and was elected into the Perlis State Legislative Assembly as the Pauh MLA after defeating Syed Atif Syed Abu Bakar of BN, Azhar Ameir of PH and Mohd Khalid Samad of the Heritage Party (WARISAN) by the majority of 2,229 votes.

== Election results ==
Perlis State Legislative Assembly
Year	Constituency	Candidate	Votes	Pct	Opponent(s)	Votes	Pct	Ballots cast	Majority	Turnout
2022	N11 Pauh	Megat Hashirat Hassan (BERSATU)	4,924	44.18%	Syed Atif Syed Abu Bakar (UMNO)	2,695	24.18%	11,145	2,229	76.60%
2022	N11 Pauh	Megat Hashirat Hassan (BERSATU)	4,924	44.18%	Azhar Ameir (PKR)	2,369	21.26%	11,145	2,229	76.60%
2022	N11 Pauh	Megat Hashirat Hassan (BERSATU)	4,924	44.18%	Mohd Khalid Samad (WARISAN)	1,157	10.38%	11,145	2,229	76.60%

== Honours ==
- Perlis
  - Recipient of Tuanku Syed Sirajuddin Jamalullail Silver Jubilee Medal (2025)
