= Asrul Nizan Abd Jalil =

Malaysian politician

Member of the Perlis State Legislative Assembly for Sena
- In office 9 May 2018 – 19 November 2022
- Preceded by: Abdul Jamil Saad (BN–UMNO)
- Succeeded by: Marzita Mansor (PN–BERSATU)
- Majority: 314 (2018)

Personal details
- Born: Asrul Nizan bin Abd Jalil; 27 December 1977 (age 48) Kangar, Perlis, Malaysia
- Party: People's Justice Party (PKR)
- Other political affiliations: Pakatan Harapan (PH)
- Spouse: Noraini Mohd Ariffin
- Children: 4
- Relatives: Asrul Aimran Abd Jalil (younger brother)
- Occupation: Politician

Asrul Nizan bin Abd Jalil (born 27 December 1977) is a Malaysian politician who served as Member of the Perlis State Legislative Assembly (MLA) for Sena from May 2018 to November 2022. He is a member of People's Justice Party (PKR), a component party of the Pakatan Harapan (PH) coalition. He is also the elder brother of Asrul Aimran Abd Jalil, the MLA for Kayang and former Member of the Perlis State Executive Council (EXCO). They are opposing politically as both of them are in opposing political sides, with himself from PH while his younger brother is from PN.

== Election results ==
Perlis State Legislative Assembly
Year	Constituency	Candidate	Votes	Pct	Opponent(s)	Votes	Pct	Ballots cast	Majority	Turnout
2018	N07 Sena	Asrul Nizan Abd Jalil (PKR)	4,177	42.07%	Azihani Ali (UMNO)	3,863	38.91%	10,113	314	82.20%
2018	N07 Sena	Asrul Nizan Abd Jalil (PKR)	4,177	42.07%	Fakhrul Anwar Ismail (PAS)	1,888	19.02%	10,113	314	82.20%
2022	N07 Sena	Asrul Nizan Abd Jalil (PKR)	3,356	28.55%	Marzita Mansor (BERSATU)	5,556	47.27%	11,929	2,200	75.20%
2022	N07 Sena	Asrul Nizan Abd Jalil (PKR)	3,356	28.55%	Saiful Daniel Mohd Yusof (UMNO)	2,619	22.28%	11,929	2,200	75.20%
2022	N07 Sena	Asrul Nizan Abd Jalil (PKR)	3,356	28.55%	Mohd Faizal Yunus (PEJUANG)	222	1.89%	11,929	2,200	75.20%
