= Rushdan Rusmi =

Malaysian politician

Yang Berhormat Tuan Rushdan Rusmi MP
- رشدان روسمي

Member of the Malaysian Parliament for Padang Besar
- Incumbent
- Assumed office 19 November 2022
- Preceded by: Zahidi Zainul Abidin (BN–UMNO)
- Majority: 12,514 (2022)

Personal details
- Born: Rushdan bin Rusmi; 29 July 1978 (age 48)
- Party: Malaysian Islamic Party (PAS)
- Other political affiliations: Perikatan Nasional (PN)
- Education: Universiti Putra Malaysia
- Occupation: Politician

Rushdan Rusmi is a Malaysian politician who has served as the Member of Parliament (MP) for Padang Besar since November 2022. He is a member of the Malaysian Islamic Party (PAS), a component party of the Perikatan Nasional (PN) coalition.

== Election results ==
Parliament of Malaysia
Year	Constituency	Candidate	Votes	Pct	Opponent(s)	Votes	Pct	Ballots cast	Majority	Turnout
2022	P001 Padang Besar	Rushdan Rusmi (PAS)	24,267	53.58%	Zahida Zarik Khan (UMNO)	11,753	25.95%	45,288	12,514	75.24%
2022	P001 Padang Besar	Rushdan Rusmi (PAS)	24,267	53.58%	Mohd Saat @ Yahya (AMANAH)	7,085	15.64%	45,288	12,514	75.24%
2022	P001 Padang Besar	Rushdan Rusmi (PAS)	24,267	53.58%	Zahidi Zainul Abidin (IND)	1,939	1.56%	45,288	12,514	75.24%
2022	P001 Padang Besar	Rushdan Rusmi (PAS)	24,267	53.58%	Ko Chu Liang (WARISAN)	244	0.54%	45,288	12,514	75.24%

== Honours ==
=== Honours of Malaysia ===
- Malaysia
  - Recipient of the 17th Yang di-Pertuan Agong Installation Medal (2024)

== Political positions ==
=== Environment ===
Rushdan Rusmi, which is also the Chairperson of the Carnival Organising Committee and Member of APPGM-SDG, officialised an event called "Pembangunan Lestari Berhad dan Persatuan Rakan Solusi Matlamat Pembangunan Lestari" in the 1st and 2 December 2025.

== See also ==
- Members of the Dewan Rakyat, 15th Malaysian Parliament
