= Wan Badariah Wan Saad =

Malaysian politician and lawyer (1976–2026)

- وان بدرية وان سعد

Member of the Perlis State Executive Council (Women, Family, Community Development, Tourism, Welfare, Disaster Relief, Culture, Arts and Heritage)
- In office 25 November 2022 – 25 December 2025
- Monarch: Sirajuddin
- Menteri Besar: Mohd Shukri Ramli
- Preceded by: Siti Berenee Yahaya (Women, Family and Community Development); Asmaiza Ahmad (Tourism, Culture, Arts and Heritage); Rozaini Rais (Welfare and Disaster Relief)
- Succeeded by: Marzita Mansor (Women, Family and Community Development, and Welfare and Disaster Relief); Abu Bakar Hamzah (Tourism, Culture, Arts and Heritage)
- Constituency: Mata Ayer

Member of the Perlis State Legislative Assembly for Mata Ayer
- In office 19 November 2022 – 31 October 2026
- Preceded by: Siti Berenee Yahaya (BN–UMNO)
- Succeeded by: TBD
- Majority: 2,021 (2022)

Faction represented in the Perlis State Legislative Assembly
- 2022–2026: Perikatan Nasional

Personal details
- Born: Wan Badariah binti Wan Saad; 21 August 1976 Arau, Perlis, Malaysia
- Died: 31 October 2026 (aged 50) Hospital Tuanku Fauziah (HTF), Kangar, Perlis, Malaysia
- Resting place: Kampung Rambai Muslim Cemetery, Pauh, Perlis
- Citizenship: Malaysia
- Party: Malaysian Islamic Party (PAS)
- Other political affiliations: Perikatan Nasional (PN)
- Spouse: Sabry Saad
- Children: 3
- Education: International Islamic University Malaysia (LLB)
- Occupation: Politician
- Profession: Lawyer

Wan Badariah Wan Saad (21 August 1976 – 31 October 2026) was a Malaysian politician and lawyer who served as Member of the Perlis State Legislative Assembly (MLA) for Mata Ayer from November 2022 to her death in October 2026, Member of the Perlis State Executive Council (EXCO) in the Perikatan Nasional (PN) state administration under Menteri Besar Mohd Shukri Ramli from November 2022 to December 2025. She was a member of the Malaysian Islamic Party (PAS), a component party of the PN coalition. She was also the Division Committee Member of PAS of Arau and Division Information Chief of Dewan Muslimat of PAS of Arau. She was also the only female PAS Perlis MLA.

== Political career ==
=== Member of the Perlis State Executive Council (2022–2025) ===
In the 2022 Perlis state election, the ruling BN suffered from huge defeat and wipeout in the assembly as none of its candidates won a state seat in the elections after losing all the 10 seats it previously held to PN. The elections ended the 63-year rule of BN in the state, saw the first ever transition of power in the history of the state and replaced BN with PN as the ruling coalition and dominant political force in the state as PN won 14 out of 15 state seats and therefore two-thirds supermajority of the assembly. Therefore, State Chairman of PN of Perlis, State Commissioner of PAS of Perlis and Sanglang MLA Mohd Shukri replaced Azlan Man as the new and 10th Menteri Besar of Perlis and formed a new PN state administration on 22 November 2022. On 25 November 2022, Wan Badariah was appointed as the Perlis State EXCO Member in charge of Women, Family, Community Development, Tourism, Welfare, Disaster Relief, Culture, Arts and Heritage.

=== Member of the Perlis State Legislative Assembly (2022–2026) ===
==== 2022 Perlis state election ====
In the 2022 state election, Wan Badariah made her electoral debut after being nominated by PN to contest for the Mata Ayer state seat. She won the seat and was elected into the Perlis State Legislative Assembly as the Mata Ayer MLA after defeating EXCO Member and defending MLA Siti Berenee Yahaya of BN and Amran Kamarudin of PH by the majority of 2,021 votes.

== Other careers ==
Wan Badariah has been a syarie lawyer since 2014, Chairperson of the Law and Human Rights Council (LUHAM) of Perlis since 2021 and a member of the Muslimat Legal Team (MUSLET) of Perlis since 2019. In addition, she has been a member of the Women Cakna Association of Arau since 2020 and a member of the Women Concern Association of Perlis since 2019. She was a solicitor advocate from 2003 to 2020.

== Death ==
Wan Badariah Wan Saad, the Member of the Perlis State Legislative Assembly (ADUN) for Mata Ayer, died at approximately 4:26 pm on 31 October 2026 at Hospital Tuanku Fauziah in Kangar. Her death was announced by PAS Perlis Information Chief Zahid Ibrahim in a Facebook post, in which he also urged the public to offer prayers for her and convey their condolences to her family.

In May 2024, Wan Badariah experienced serious health complications related to a thyroid condition, which led to her being placed in a medically induced coma to aid her recovery. Her condition subsequently improved, allowing her to resume her duties as a state assemblywoman.

== Election results ==
Perlis State Legislative Assembly
Year	Constituency	Candidate	Votes	Pct	Opponent(s)	Votes	Pct	Ballots cast	Majority	Turnout
2022	N04 Mata Ayer	Wan Badariah Wan Saad (PAS)	4,419	58.06%	Siti Berenee Yahaya (UMNO)	2,398	31.51%	7,611	2,021	78.77%
2022	N04 Mata Ayer	Wan Badariah Wan Saad (PAS)	4,419	58.06%	Amran Kamarudin (PKR)	794	10.43%	7,611	2,021	78.77%

== Honours ==
- Perlis
  - Recipient of Tuanku Syed Sirajuddin Jamalullail Silver Jubilee Medal (2025)

== See also ==
- List of International Islamic University Malaysia alumni
