= Zahidi Zainul Abidin =

Malaysian politician (1961–2026)

Yang Berbahagia Datuk Zahidi Zainul Abidin DMSM SMP
- زاهدي زين العابدين
- Zahidi in 2020

Deputy Minister of Communications and Multimedia
- In office 30 August 2021 – 24 November 2022
- Monarch: Abdullah
- Prime Minister: Ismail Sabri Yaakob
- Minister: Annuar Musa
- Preceded by: Himself
- Succeeded by: Teo Nie Ching (Deputy Minister of Communications and Digital)
- Constituency: Padang Besar
- In office 10 March 2020 – 16 August 2021
- Monarch: Abdullah
- Prime Minister: Muhyiddin Yassin
- Minister: Saifuddin Abdullah
- Preceded by: Eddin Syazlee Shith
- Succeeded by: Himself
- Constituency: Padang Besar

Chairman of the Rubber Industry Smallholders Development Authority
- In office 1 September 2015 – 27 December 2018
- Minister: Ismail Sabri Yaakob (2015–2018); Rina Harun (2018)
- Director-General: Mohd Najib A. Samad (2015–2017); Wan Ahmad Shabri Zainuddin Wan Mohamad (2017–2018)
- Preceded by: Abdul Rahim Thamby Chik
- Succeeded by: Rosely Kusip

Member of the Malaysian Parliament for Padang Besar
- In office 5 May 2013 – 19 November 2022
- Preceded by: Azmi Khalid (BN–UMNO)
- Succeeded by: Rushdan Rusmi (PN–PAS)
- Majority: 7,426 (2013); 1,438 (2018)

Member of the Perlis State Legislative Assembly for Beseri
- In office 29 November 1999 – 8 March 2008
- Preceded by: Nordin Abdullah (BN–UMNO)
- Succeeded by: Mat Rawi Kassim (BN–UMNO)
- Majority: 819 (1999); 1,871 (2004)

Exco roles (Perlis)
- 1999–2003: Deputy Chairman of the Education
- 2003–2006: Chairman of the Investment, Trade, Science, Technology, Consumerism and Agro-based Industry

Faction represented in Dewan Rakyat
- 2013–2022: Barisan Nasional

Faction represented in the Perlis State Legislative Assembly
- 1999–2008: Barisan Nasional

Personal details
- Born: Zahidi bin Zainul Abidin; 9 January 1961 Perlis, Malaysia
- Died: 13 November 2026 (aged 65) Bayan Lepas, Penang, Malaysia
- Citizenship: Malaysia
- Party: United Malays National Organisation (UMNO) (–2022); Independent (2022–2024); People's Justice Party (PKR) (2024–2026)
- Other political affiliations: Barisan Nasional (BN) (–2022); Pakatan Harapan (PH) (2024–2026)
- Occupation: Politician
- Zahidi Zainul Abidin on Facebook; Zahidi Zainul Abidin on Parliament of Malaysia

Zahidi bin Zainul Abidin (9 January 1961 – 13 November 2026) was a Malaysian politician who served as the Deputy Minister of Communications and Multimedia for the second term in the Barisan Nasional (BN) administration under former Prime Minister Ismail Sabri Yaakob and former Minister Annuar Musa from August 2021 to the collapse of the BN administration in November 2022 and the first term in the Perikatan Nasional (PN) administration under former Prime Minister Muhyiddin Yassin and former Minister Saifuddin Abdullah from March 2020 to the collapse of the PN administration in August 2021.

Zahidi received a diploma in Public Administration from Institut Teknologi MARA. At the state level, he was a member of the Perlis State Legislative Assembly (MLA) for Beseri from November 1999 to March 2008, during which he was a member of the Perlis State Executive Council (EXCO) in the BN state administration under former Menteri Besar Shahidan Kassim from 1999 to 2006. He became a national Member of Parliament (MP) for Padang Besar from May 2013 to November 2022. He was a member of the People's Justice Party (Malaysia) (PKR), a component party of the Pakatan Harapan (PH) coalition and was a member of the United Malays National Organisation (UMNO), a component party of the BN coalition. He was chairman of the Rubber Industry Smallholders Development Authority (RISDA) from September 2015 to December 2018. Zahidi joined AMANAH in 2023, despite previously planning to join the People's Justice Party (PKR).

== Early life and education ==
Zahidi Zainul Abidin was born at Perlis, Malaysia on 9 January 1961. He received his Diploma in Public Administration from the Institut Teknologi MARA (now Universiti Teknologi MARA).

== Political career ==
Zahadi's first political appointment was as the Islamic Education Chief of UMNO Youth, which he started in 1991.

From 1999 until 2008, Zahidi represented Beseri in the Perlis State Legislative Assembly. During this period from 1999 to 2006, he was a member of the Perlis State Executive Council under Chief Minister Shahidan Kassim. In 2013, Zahidi was elected to the national constituency of Padang Besar, where he remained MP until 2022. He served as the Chairman of the Rubber Industry Smallholders Development Authority (RISDA). He was also the Chairman of the Malaysian International Institute of Islamic Cooperation (IKIAM). From March 2020 until November 2022, he served as a deputy minister, first under Muhyiddin Yassin, and then under Ismail Sabri Yaakob.

In September 2020, Zahidi falsely accused a Sabahan foundation student named Veveonah Mosibin from Universiti Malaysia Sabah of trying to popularise her YouTube channel when she posted a video of her in a hut on top of a tree struggling to take an exam. Veveonah at the time had to stay home due to Malaysia's Movement Control Order (MCO) to stop the COVID-19 outbreak in the country and had to go on top of tree to get signal for internet connection. Zahidi was later made to apologise for his inaccurate remark in Dewan Negara and informed that it was Abdul Rahim Bakri of Kudat MP who told him that Veveonah did not have exams on the day she uploaded the video, of which, later clarified otherwise by the university's chairman, Masidi Manjun.

The aftermath of the incident had brought Zahidi's academic credentials under spotlight for purportedly dubious academic qualification while Veveonah's hometown district got 13 new telecommunication towers expeditiously installed with 4G connection under the JENDELA program.

Zahidi joined AMANAH by submitting his membership application form to the party on 4 February 2023 although he had revealed on 30 January 2023 that he planned to join the People's Justice Party (PKR), another PH component party.

== Personal life and death ==
In January 2021, Zahidi was tested positive for COVID-19 and sent to Sungai Buloh Hospital for treatment. He was discharged after 11 days.

On 13 November 2026, Zahidi died at a private hospital in Penang, two days after his health started deteriorating, due to kidney failure. He was 65. Zahidi was buried at the Bayan Lepas Muslim Cemetery the same night.

== Election results ==
Perlis State Legislative Assembly
Year	Constituency	Candidate	Votes	Pct	Opponent(s)	Votes	Pct	Ballots cast	Majority	Turnout
1999	N02 Beseri	Zahidi Zainul Abidin (UMNO)	2,774	58.66%	Abd Rahman Rejab (PAS)	1,955	41.34%	5,069	819	73.77%
2004	N02 Beseri	Zahidi Zainul Abidin (UMNO)	3,492	68.30%	Mohd Anuar Mohd Tahir (PAS)	1,621	31.70%	5,222	1,871	78.59%
2022	N01 Titi Tinggi	Zahidi Zainul Abidin (IND)	425	4.43%	Izizam Ibrahim (BERSATU)	5,601	58.42%	9,748	3,785	72.70%
2022	N01 Titi Tinggi	Zahidi Zainul Abidin (IND)	425	4.43%	Teh Chai Aan (MCA)	1,816	18.94%	9,748	3,785	72.70%
2022	N01 Titi Tinggi	Zahidi Zainul Abidin (IND)	425	4.43%	Teh Seng Chuan (DAP)	1,512	15.77%	9,748	3,785	72.70%
2022	N01 Titi Tinggi	Zahidi Zainul Abidin (IND)	425	4.43%	Mohd Shahril Md Sarif (PEJUANG)	152	1.59%	9,748	3,785	72.70%
2022	N01 Titi Tinggi	Zahidi Zainul Abidin (IND)	425	4.43%	Khaw Hock Kong (WARISAN)	81	0.84%	9,748	3,785	72.70%

Parliament of Malaysia
Year	Constituency	Candidate	Votes	Pct	Opponent(s)	Votes	Pct	Ballots cast	Majority	Turnout
2013	P001 Padang Besar	Zahidi Zainul Abidin (UMNO)	21,473	60.45%	Azamhari Mohamood (PAS)	14,047	39.55%	36,142	7,426	86.11%
2018	P001 Padang Besar	Zahidi Zainul Abidin (UMNO)	15,032	41.18%	Izizam Ibrahim (BERSATU)	13,594	37.24%	37,432	1,438	81.20%
2018	P001 Padang Besar	Zahidi Zainul Abidin (UMNO)	15,032	41.18%	Mokhtar Senik (PAS)	7,874	21.57%	37,432	1,438	81.20%
2022	P001 Padang Besar	Zahidi Zainul Abidin (IND)	1,939	1.56%	Rushdan Rusmi (PAS)	24,267	53.58%	45,288	12,514	75.24%
2022	P001 Padang Besar	Zahidi Zainul Abidin (IND)	1,939	1.56%	Zahida Zarik Khan (UMNO)	11,753	25.95%	45,288	12,514	75.24%
2022	P001 Padang Besar	Zahidi Zainul Abidin (IND)	1,939	1.56%	Mohd Saat @ Yahya (AMANAH)	7,085	15.64%	45,288	12,514	75.24%
2022	P001 Padang Besar	Zahidi Zainul Abidin (IND)	1,939	1.56%	Ko Chu Liang (WARISAN)	244	0.54%	45,288	12,514	75.24%

== Honours ==
=== Honours of Malaysia ===
- Malacca
  - Companion Class I of the Exalted Order of Malacca (DMSM) – Datuk (2003)
- Perlis
  - Companion of the Order of the Crown of Perlis (SMP) (2003)
