= Saad Seman =

Malaysian politician

Haji Saad Seman
- سااد سيمن

Member of the Perlis State Legislative Assembly for Chuping
- In office 2022–2025
- Preceded by: Asmaiza Ahmad
- Succeeded by: Seat vacant

Personal details
- Born: Saad bin Seman; 9 January 1959 (age 67) Perlis
- Citizenship: Malaysian
- Party: PAS (till 2025, since 2026)
- Other political affiliations: Perikatan Nasional (till 2025, since 2026)
- Occupation: Politician

Saad bin Seman is a Malaysian politician from PAS. He served as the Member of the Perlis State Legislative Assembly for Chuping from 2022 to 2025.

== Political career ==
On 24 December 2025, Saad's PAS membership was terminated as he and 2 other PAS and 5 BERSATU members of Perlis State Legislative Assembly had sent a Statutory Declaration to pull back support from the then-Menteri Besar, Mohd Shukri Ramli. At the same time, his seat is declared vacant by the Speaker of Perlis State Legislative Assembly. On 1 February 2026, he and the other 2 PAS MLAs whose membership had been terminated applied to re-enter PAS, and the application was accepted.

== Election results ==
Perlis State Legislative Assembly
Year	Constituency	Candidate	Votes	Pct.	Opponent(s)	Votes	Pct.	Ballots cast	Majority	Turnout
2022	N03 Chuping	Saad Seman (PAS)	5,873	53.74%	Asmaiza Ahmad (UMNO)	3,453	31.60%	11,111	2,420	77.98%
2022	N03 Chuping	Saad Seman (PAS)	5,873	53.74%	Natthavuth Seng (PKR)	1,602	14.66	11,111	2,420	77.98%
