= Azmi Khalid =

Malaysian politician

Yang Berbahagia Tan Sri Dato' Seri Azmi Khalid PSM SPMP DPMP SIMP DGSM SMP
- عزمي خالد

Minister of Natural Resources and Environment
- In office 14 February 2006 – 18 March 2008
- Monarch: Mizan Zainal Abidin
- Prime Minister: Abdullah Ahmad Badawi
- Deputy: Sothinathan Sinna Goundar (2004–2008)
- Preceded by: Adenan Satem
- Succeeded by: Douglas Uggah Embas
- Constituency: Padang Besar

Minister of Home Affairs
- In office 27 March 2004 – 14 February 2006
- Monarch: Mizan Zainal Abidin
- Prime Minister: Abdullah Ahmad Badawi
- Deputy: Tan Chai Ho
- Preceded by: Abdullah Ahmad Badawi
- Succeeded by: Mohd Radzi Sheikh Ahmad
- Constituency: Padang Besar

Minister of Rural Development
- In office 15 December 1999 – 26 March 2004
- Monarchs: Salahuddin Abdul Aziz Shah; Syed Sirajuddin
- Prime Minister: Mahathir Mohamad; Abdullah Ahmad Badawi
- Deputy: Palanivel Govindasamy
- Preceded by: Annuar Musa
- Succeeded by: Abdul Aziz Shamsuddin as Minister of Rural and Regional Development
- Constituency: Padang Besar

Deputy Minister of Home Affairs II
- In office 2 July 1997 – 14 December 1999 Serving with Ong Ka Ting (Deputy Minister of Home Affairs I)
- Monarchs: Ja'afar; Salahuddin Abdul Aziz Shah
- Prime Minister: Mahathir Mohamad
- Minister: Mahathir Mohamad
- Preceded by: Megat Junid Megat Ayub
- Constituency: Padang Besar

Parliamentary Secretary in the Prime Minister's Department
- In office 1995–1997 Serving with Muhammad Abdullah
- Monarch: Ja'afar
- Prime Minister: Mahathir Mohamad
- Minister: Abdul Hamid Othman; Abang Abu Bakar Abang Mustapha; Chong Kah Kiat; Siti Zaharah Sulaiman; Tajol Rosli Mohd Ghazali
- Deputy Minister: Mohamed Nazri Abdul Aziz; Raja Ariffin Raja Sulaiman; Ibrahim Saad; Ibrahim Ali; Fauzi Abdul Rahman
- Succeeded by: Noh Omar
- Constituency: Padang Besar

Member of the Malaysian Parliament for Padang Besar
- In office 25 April 1995 – 5 May 2013
- Preceded by: new constituency
- Succeeded by: Zahidi Zainul Abidin (BN–UMNO)
- Majority: 10,070 (1995); 4,519 (1999); 9,265 (2004); 5,348 (2008)

Faction represented in Dewan Rakyat
- 1995–2013: Barisan Nasional

Personal details
- Born: Azmi bin Khalid; 13 December 1940 (age 85) Perlis, Unfederated Malay States (now Malaysia)
- Party: United Malays National Organisation (UMNO) (until ?); Malaysian United Indigenous Party (BERSATU) (?-present)
- Other political affiliations: Barisan Nasional (BN) (until ?); Perikatan Nasional (PN) (?-present)
- Spouse(s): Yasmin Abdullah (Deceased); Normala Shamsuddin
- Occupation: Politician

Azmi bin Khalid (Jawi: عزمي خالد; born 13 December 1940) is a Malaysian politician who served as Minister of Natural Resources and Environment and Member of Parliament (MP) for Padang Besar from April 1995 to May 2013. He was also a minister in the federal Cabinet from 1999 to 2008, as a member of the United Malay National Organisation (UMNO) in the then-ruling Barisan Nasional coalition.

Tan Sri Azmi's first ministerial appointment was as Minister of Rural Development, becoming the first Cabinet minister from Perlis. He became the Minister of Home Affairs in 2004, before moving to the Ministry of Natural Resources and Environment in 2006. He lost his Cabinet position after the 2008 election for reasons tied to his involvement in political disruption in Perlis. He did not re-contest Padang Besar in the 2013 election.

In 2005, Azmi married television personality Normala Shamsuddin. He has four children to his late wife Yasmin Abdullah.

== Election results ==
Parliament of Malaysia
Year	Constituency	Candidate	Votes	Pct	Opponent(s)	Votes	Pct	Ballots cast	Majority	Turnout
1995	P001 Padang Besar	Azmi Khalid (UMNO)	17,013	71.02%	Hisharudin Hasan (PAS)	6,943	28.98%	25,854	10,070	77.65%
1999	P001 Padang Besar	Azmi Khalid (UMNO)	14,386	59.32%	Mohd Anuar Mohd Tahir (keADILan)	9,867	40.68%	25,347	4,519	78.04%
2004	P001 Padang Besar	Azmi Khalid (UMNO)	18,323	66.92%	Wan Kharizal Wan Khazim (PAS)	9,058	33.08%	28,453	9,265	83.93%
2008	P001 Padang Besar	Azmi Khalid (UMNO)	16,991	59.34%	Zolkharnain Abidin (PAS)	11,643	40.66%	29,310	5,348	80.05%

== Honours ==
=== Honours of Malaysia ===
- Malaysia
  - Commander of the Order of Loyalty to the Crown of Malaysia (PSM) – Tan Sri (2013)
- Malacca
  - Grand Commander of the Exalted Order of Malacca (DGSM) – Datuk Seri (2007)
- Pahang
  - Knight Grand Companion of the Order of the Crown of Pahang (SIMP) – formerly Dato', now Dato' Indera (2000)
- Perlis
  - Knight Grand Commander of the Order of the Crown of Perlis (SPMP) – Dato' Seri (2005)
  - Knight Commander of the Order of the Crown of Perlis (DPMP) – Dato' (1996)
  - Companion of the Order of the Crown of Perlis (SMP) (1980)
