= Santan (state constituency) =

Electoral district in Perlis, Malaysia

Santan (N05)
Perlis constituency

State constituency
- Legislature: Perlis State Legislative Assembly
MLA
Mohammad Azmir Azizan
PN
- Constituency created: 1994
- First contested: 1995
- Last contested: 2022

Demographics
- Electors (2022): 10,751

Santan is a state constituency in Perlis, Malaysia, that has been represented in the Perlis State Legislative Assembly.

The state constituency was created in 1994. It was first contested in 1995 and is mandated to return a single Assemblyman to the Perlis State Legislative Assembly under the first-past-the-post voting system. Since 2022, the State Assemblyman for Santan is Mohammad Azmir Azizan from Perikatan Nasional (PN).

== Definition ==
=== Polling districts ===
According to the federal gazette issued on 31 October 2022, the Santan constituency is divided into 6 polling districts.

| State constituency | Polling Districts | Code | Location |
|---|---|---|---|
| Santan（N05） | Kampong Darat | 001/05/01 | SK Seri Tunjong |
| Santan（N05） | Paya | 001/05/02 | SK Paya |
| Santan（N05） | Alor Tampang | 001/05/03 | Pusat Kegiatan (Kemas) Alor Tampang |
| Santan（N05） | Padang Lati | 001/05/04 | Dewan Seri Melati Beseri |
| Santan（N05） | Padang Pauh | 001/05/05 | SMK Abi |
| Santan（N05） | Santan | 001/05/06 | SK Santan |

== Demographics ==
Ethnic breakdown of Santan's electorate as of 2022
1. Malay (99.0%)
2. Chinese (0.46%)
3. Other ethnicities (0.46%)
4. Indian (0.08%)

Total electors by polling district in 2016
| Polling district | Electors |
|---|---|
| Kampong Darat | 1,191 |
| Paya | 1,872 |
| Alor Tampang | 1,021 |
| Padang Lati | 1,159 |
| Padang Pauh | 1,366 |
| Santan | 1,635 |
| Total | 8,244 |
Source: Malaysian Election Commission

=== History ===
Members of the Legislative Assembly for Santan
| Assembly | No | Years | Member | Party |
Constituency created, renamed from Padang Pauh and Beseri
| 9th | N05 | 1995–1999 | Bahari Taib | BN (UMNO) |
| 10th | N05 | 1999–2004 | Zolkharnain Abidin | PAS |
| 11th | N05 | 2004–2008 | Sabry Ahmad | BN (UMNO) |
| 12th | N05 | 2008–2013 | Sabry Ahmad | BN (UMNO) |
| 13th | N05 | 2013–2018 | Sabry Ahmad | BN (UMNO) |
| 14th | N05 | 2018–2022 | Azizan Sulaiman | BN (UMNO) |
| 15th | N05 | 2022–present | Mohammad Azmir Azizan | PN (PAS) |

== Election results ==
Perlis state election, 2022
| Party | Candidate | Votes | % | ∆% |
|---|---|---|---|---|
| PN | Mohammad Azmir Azizan | 4,752 | 56.40 | ▲56.40 |
| BN | Azizan Sulaiman | 2,644 | 31.08 | ▼9.68 |
| PH | Che Mazlina Che Yob | 1,030 | 12.22 | ▲12.22 |
| Total valid votes | | 8,426 | 100.00 | |
| Total rejected ballots | | 72 | | |
| Unreturned ballots | | 13 | | |
| Turnout | | 8,511 | 79.16 | ▼4.14 |
| Registered electors | | 10,751 | | |
| Majority | | 2,108 | 25.02 | ▲11.98 |
| PN gain from BN | | Swing | | ? |

Perlis state election, 2018
| Party | Candidate | Votes | % | ∆% |
|---|---|---|---|---|
| BN | Azizan Sulaiman | 3,071 | 40.76 | ▼16.63 |
| PKR | Che Mazlina Che Yob | 2,122 | 30.10 | ▲30.10 |
| PAS | Baharuddin Ahmad | 2,088 | 29.14 | ▼13.47 |
| Total valid votes | | 7,281 | 100.00 | |
| Total rejected ballots | | 102 | | |
| Unreturned ballots | | 41 | | |
| Turnout | | 7,424 | 83.30 | ▼5.32 |
| Registered electors | | 8,912 | | |
| Majority | | 949 | 13.03 | ▼1.75 |
| BN hold | | Swing | | |

Perlis state election, 2013
| Party | Candidate | Votes | % | ∆% |
|---|---|---|---|---|
| BN | Sabry Ahmad | 4,209 | 57.39 | ▲1.68 |
| PAS | Mohd Anuar Mohd Tahir | 3,125 | 42.61 | ▼1.68 |
| Total valid votes | | 7,334 | 100.00 | |
| Total rejected ballots | | 93 | | |
| Unreturned ballots | | 22 | | |
| Turnout | | 7,449 | 88.63 | ▲3.71 |
| Registered electors | | 8,405 | | |
| Majority | | 1,084 | 14.78 | ▲3.37 |
| BN hold | | Swing | | |
Source(s) "Federal Government Gazette - Notice of Contested Election, State Legislative Assembly for the State of Perlis [P.U. (B) 185/2013]" (PDF). Attorney General's Chambers of Malaysia. 26 April 2013. "Federal Government Gazette - Results of Contested Election and Statements of the Poll after the Official Addition of Votes, State Constituencies for the State of Perlis [P.U. (B) 226/2013]" (PDF). Attorney General's Chambers of Malaysia. 22 May 2013.

Perlis state election, 2008
| Party | Candidate | Votes | % | ∆% |
|---|---|---|---|---|
| BN | Sabry Ahmad | 3,475 | 55.71 | ▲0.89 |
| PAS | Abd Rashid Abd Rahman | 2,763 | 44.29 | ▼0.89 |
| Total valid votes | | 6,238 | 100.00 | |
| Total rejected ballots | | 101 | | |
| Unreturned ballots | | 12 | | |
| Turnout | | 6,351 | 84.92 | ▼1.60 |
| Registered electors | | 7,479 | | |
| Majority | | 712 | 11.41 | ▲1.76 |
| BN hold | | Swing | | |

Perlis state election, 2004
| Party | Candidate | Votes | % | ∆% |
|---|---|---|---|---|
| BN | Sabry Ahmad | 3,284 | 54.82 | ▲7.34 |
| PAS | Zolkharnain Abidin | 2,706 | 45.18 | ▼7.34 |
| Total valid votes | | 5,990 | 100.00 | |
| Total rejected ballots | | 73 | | |
| Unreturned ballots | | 0 | | |
| Turnout | | 6,063 | 86.52 | ▲1.17 |
| Registered electors | | 7,008 | | |
| Majority | | 578 | 9.65 | ▲4.61 |
| BN gain from PAS | | Swing | | ? |

Perlis state election, 1999
| Party | Candidate | Votes | % | ∆% |
|---|---|---|---|---|
| PAS | Zolkharnain Abidin | 2,802 | 52.52 | ▲15.90 |
| BN | Bahari Taib | 2,533 | 47.48 | ▼15.90 |
| Total valid votes | | 5,335 | 100.00 | |
| Total rejected ballots | | 87 | | |
| Unreturned ballots | | 87 | | |
| Turnout | | 5,509 | 85.34 | ▲8.27 |
| Registered electors | | 6,455 | | |
| Majority | | 269 | 5.04 | ▼21.72 |
| PAS gain from BN | | Swing | | ? |

Perlis state election, 1995
| Party | Candidate | Votes | % |
|---|---|---|---|
| BN | Bahari Taib | 3,107 | 63.38 |
| PAS | Abdullah Jasin | 1,795 | 36.62 |
| Total valid votes | | 4,902 | 100.00 |
| Total rejected ballots | | 96 | |
| Unreturned ballots | | 6 | |
| Turnout | | 5,004 | 77.08 |
| Registered electors | | 6,492 | |
| Majority | | 1,312 | 26.76 |
This was a new constituency created.
