= Haziq Asyraf Dun =

Malaysian politician

Yang Berhormat Haziq Asyraf Dun MLA
- هازيق اشراف دون

Member of the Perlis State Legislative Assembly for Beseri
- Incumbent
- Assumed office 2022
- Preceded by: Rouzaini Rais

Personal details
- Born: Haziq Asyraf bin Dun; 25 March 1991 (age 35)
- Citizenship: Malaysian
- Party: PAS
- Other political affiliations: Perikatan Nasional
- Education: SMK Derma; National University of Malaysia
- Occupation: Politician

Haziq Asyraf bin Dun is a Malaysian politician from PAS. He has served as the Member of the Perlis State Legislative Assembly for Beseri since 2022.

== Political career ==
Haziq is currently the Deputy Chief of PAS Perlis Youth Wing and the Information Chief of PN Perlis Youth Wing.

== Election results ==
Perlis State Legislative Assembly
Year	Constituency	Candidate	Votes	Pct.	Opponent(s)	Votes	Pct.	Ballots cast	Majority	Turnout
2022	N02 Beseri	Haziq Asyraf Dun (PAS)	4,040	45.84%	Ruzaini Rais (UMNO)	2,993	33.96%	8,939	1,047	73.70%
2022	N02 Beseri	Haziq Asyraf Dun (PAS)	4,040	45.84%	Mat Safar Saad (AMANAH)	1,684	19.11%	8,939	1,047	73.70%
2022	N02 Beseri	Haziq Asyraf Dun (PAS)	4,040	45.84%	Shamim Nordin (WARISAN)	96	1.09%	8,939	1,047	73.70%
