= Teh Chai Aan =

Malaysian politician

- 郑再安

Member of the Perlis State Executive Council (Natural Resources, Environment, Biotechnology, Green Technology and Health)
- In office 13 June 2018 – 22 November 2022
- Monarch: Sirajuddin
- Menteri Besar: Azlan Man
- Preceded by: Mat Rawi Kassim (Natural Resources and Environment); Ahmad Bakri Ali (Biotechnology and Green Technology); Nurulhisham Yaakob (Health)
- Succeeded by: Mohd Shukri Ramli (Natural Resources); Megat Hashirat Hassan (Environment, Biotechnology, Green Technology and Health)
- Constituency: Titi Tinggi

Member of the Perlis State Legislative Assembly for Titi Tinggi
- In office 9 May 2018 – 19 November 2022
- Preceded by: Khaw Hock King (BN–MCA)
- Succeeded by: Izizam Ibrahim (PN–BERSATU)
- Majority: 142 (2018)

Personal details
- Born: Teh Chai Aan Perlis, Malaysia
- Citizenship: Malaysian
- Party: Malaysian Chinese Association (MCA)
- Other political affiliations: Barisan Nasional (BN)
- Occupation: Politician

Teh Chai Aan

Chinese name
- Traditional Chinese: 鄭再安
- Simplified Chinese: 郑再安
- Hanyu Pinyin: Zhèng Zài'ān
- Jyutping: Zeng6 Zoi3 On1
- Hokkien POJ: Tēⁿ Chài-an
- Tâi-lô: Tēnn Tsài-an

Teh Chai Aan (simplified Chinese: 郑再安; traditional Chinese: 鄭再安; pinyin: Zhèng Zài'ān; Jyutping: Zeng6 Zoi3 On1; Pe̍h-ōe-jī: Tēⁿ Chài-an) is a Malaysian politician who served as the Member of the Perlis State Executive Council (EXCO) in the Barisan Nasional (BN) state administration under former Menteri Besar Azlan Man from May 2018 to the collapse of the BN state administration in November 2022 as well as Member of the Perlis State Legislative Assembly (MLA) for Titi Tinggi from May 2018 to November 2022. He is a member of the Malaysian Chinese Association (MCA), a component party of the BN coalition. He is one of the only two MCA candidates elected in the 2018 state elections of all the states except Sarawak. He was also the sole Perlis EXCO Member and MLA of MCA and sole EXCO Member of the Chinese ethnicity.

== Political career ==
=== Member of the Perlis State Executive Council (2018–2022) ===
On 13 June 2018, Teh was appointed as the Perlis State EXCO Member in Natural Resources, Environment, Biotechnology, Green Technology and Health by Menteri Besar Azlan.

On 22 November 2022, Teh lost his position after the BN state administration collapsed following the huge defeat of BN in the 2022 Perlis state election that wiped BN out of the assembly.

=== Member of the Perlis State Legislative Assembly (2018–2022) ===
==== 2018 Perlis state election ====
In the 2018 Perlis state election, Teh made his electoral debut after being nominated by BN to contest for the Titi Tinggi state seat. He won the seat and was elected into the Perlis State Legislative Assembly as the Titi Tinggi MLA after narrowly defeating Teh Seng Chuan of Pakatan Harapan (PH), Kamis Yub of Gagasan Sejahtera (GS) as well as the independent candidate Yaacob Man by a majority of only 142 votes.

==== 2022 Perlis state election ====
In the 2022 Perlis state election, Teh was renominated by BN to defend the Titi Tinggi seat. He lost the seat and was not reelected as the Titi Tinggi MLA after losing to Izizam Ibrahim of Perikatan Nasional (PN) by a majority of 3,785 votes.

== Election results ==
Perlis State Legislative Assembly
| Year | Constituency | Candidate | Votes | Pct | Opponent(s) | Votes | Pct | Ballots cast | Majority | Turnout |
|---|---|---|---|---|---|---|---|---|---|---|
| 2018 | N01 Titi Tinggi | Teh Chai Aan (MCA) | 2,762 | 35.39% | Teh Seng Chuan (DAP) | 2,620 | 33.57% | 8,018 | 142 | 79.30% |
| 2018 | N01 Titi Tinggi | Teh Chai Aan (MCA) | 2,762 | 35.39% | Kamis Yub (PAS) | 2,291 | 29.36% | 8,018 | 142 | 79.30% |
| 2018 | N01 Titi Tinggi | Teh Chai Aan (MCA) | 2,762 | 35.39% | Yaacob Man (IND) | 132 | 1.68% | 8,018 | 142 | 79.30% |
| 2022 | N01 Titi Tinggi | Teh Chai Aan (MCA) | 1,816 | 18.94% | Izizam Ibrahim (BERSATU) | 5,601 | 58.42% | 9,748 | 3,785 | 72.73% |
| 2022 | N01 Titi Tinggi | Teh Chai Aan (MCA) | 1,816 | 18.94% | Teh Seng Chuan (DAP) | 1,512 | 15.77% | 9,748 | 3,785 | 72.73% |
| 2022 | N01 Titi Tinggi | Teh Chai Aan (MCA) | 1,816 | 18.94% | Zahidi Zainul Abidin (IND) | 425 | 4.43% | 9,748 | 3,785 | 72.73% |
| 2022 | N01 Titi Tinggi | Teh Chai Aan (MCA) | 1,816 | 18.94% | Mohd Shahril Md Sharif (PEJUANG) | 152 | 1.59% | 9,748 | 3,785 | 72.73% |
| 2022 | N01 Titi Tinggi | Teh Chai Aan (MCA) | 1,816 | 18.94% | Khaw Hock Kong (WARISAN) | 81 | 0.84% | 9,748 | 3,785 | 72.73% |
