= Izizam Ibrahim =

Malaysian politician

Yang Berhormat Tuan Izizam Ibrahim PPN MLA

Member of the Perlis State Executive Council (Facilities, Infrastructure, Transport, Border Relations and Cooperation, Integrated Coordination and Public Complaints)
- In office 25 November 2022 – 25 December 2025
- Monarch: Sirajuddin
- Menteri Besar: Mohd Shukri Ramli
- Preceded by: Hamizan Hassan (Facilities, Infrastructure and Transport); Rozaini Rais (Border Relations and Cooperation); Nurulhisham Yaakob (Integrated Coordination and Public Complaints)
- Succeeded by: TBA
- Constituency: Titi Tinggi

Member of the Perlis State Legislative Assembly for Titi Tinggi
- Incumbent
- Assumed office 19 November 2022
- Preceded by: Teh Chai Aan (BN–MCA)
- Majority: 3,785 (2022)

Faction represented in Perlis State Legislative Assembly
- 2022–: Perikatan Nasional

Personal details
- Born: Izizam bin Ibrahim; 1976 (age 49–50)
- Citizenship: Malaysian
- Party: United Malays National Organisation (UMNO) (–2016); Malaysian United Indigenous Party (BERSATU) (since 2016)
- Other political affiliations: Barisan Nasional (BN) (–2016); Pakatan Harapan (PH) (2017–2020); Perikatan Nasional (PN) (since 2020)
- Education: Open University Malaysia (OUM) (Bachelor of Business Administration (Hons))
- Occupation: Politician

Izizam bin Ibrahim is a Malaysian politician who has served as Member of the Perlis State Legislative Assembly (MLA) for Titi Tinggi since November 2022. He served as Member of the Perlis State Executive Council (EXCO) in the Perikatan Nasional (PN) state administration under Menteri Besar Mohd Shukri Ramli from November 2022 to November 2025. He is the first Titi Tinggi MLA of Malay ethnicity. He is a member of the Malaysian United Indigenous Party (BERSATU), a component party of the PN and formerly Pakatan Harapan (PH) coalition. He is the State Treasurer of PN of Perlis, State Deputy Chairman of BERSATU of Perlis and Division Chief of BERSATU of Padang Besar. He was a member of the United Malays National Organisation (UMNO), a component party of the Barisan Nasional (BN) coalition. He was the Branch Deputy Head of Public Housing (RPA) of UMNO of Padang Besar, Branch Youth Head of RPA of UMNO Padang Besar, Division Member of the Information Committee of UMNO of Padang Besar. He is also presently one of the three BERSATU Perlis EXCO Members along with Megat Hashirat Hassan and Wan Zikri Afthar Ishak.

== Political career ==
=== Member of the Perlis State Executive Council (since 2022) ===
In the 2022 Perlis state election, the ruling BN suffered from huge defeat and wipeout in the assembly as none of its candidates won a state seat in the elections after losing all the 10 seats it previously held to PN. The elections ended 63-year rule of BN in the state, saw the first ever transition of power in the history of the state and replaced BN with PN as the ruling coalition and dominant political force in the state as PN won 14 out of 15 state seats and therefore two-thirds supermajority of the assembly. Therefore, State Chairman of PN of Perlis, State Commissioner of PAS of Perlis and Sanglang MLA Mohd Shukri replaced Azlan Man as the new and 10th Menteri Besar of Perlis and formed a new PN state administration on 22 November 2022. On 25 November 2022, Izizam was appointed as the Perlis State EXCO Member in charge of Facilities, Infrastructure, Transport, Border Relations and Cooperation, Integrated Coordination and Public Complaints. On 25 December 2025, Mohd Shukri resigned as the Menteri Besar and the state government collapsed due to his poor health and after he lost the majority support in the assembly as a result of withdrawal of support from 8 MLAs, 5 of BERSATU and 3 of PAS. Izizam lost his position as the Perlis EXCO Member.

=== Candidate for the Member of Parliament (2018) ===
==== 2018 general election ====
In the 2018 general election, Izizam made his electoral debut after being nominated by PH to contest for the Padang Besar federal seat. He was not elected as the Padang Besar MP after losing to defending MP Zahidi Zainul Abidin of BN by a minority of 1,438 votes.

=== Member of the Perlis State Legislative Assembly (since 2022) ===
==== 2022 Perlis state election ====
In the 2022 state election, Izizam was nominated by PN to contest for the Titi Tinggi state seat. He won the seat and was elected into the Perlis State Legislative Assembly as the Titi Tinggi MLA after defeating EXCO Member and defending MLA Teh Chai Aan of BN, Teh Seng Chuan of PH, independent candidate Zahidi, Mohd Shahril Md Sarif of the Homeland Fighters Party (PEJUANG) and Khaw Hock Kong of the Heritage Party (WARISAN) by the majority of 3,785 votes. In 2022 general election, he won the seat for Titi Tinggi and become the first Malay MLA that represent the constituency ever.

== Election results ==
Parliament of Malaysia
| Year | Constituency | Candidate | Votes | Pct | Opponent(s) | Votes | Pct | Ballots cast | Majority | Turnout |
|---|---|---|---|---|---|---|---|---|---|---|
| 2018 | P001 Padang Besar | Izizam Ibrahim (BERSATU) | 13,594 | 37,24% | Zahidi Zainul Abidin (UMNO) | 15,032 | 41.18% | 37,432 | 1,438 | 81.20% |
| 2018 | P001 Padang Besar | Izizam Ibrahim (BERSATU) | 13,594 | 37,24% | Mokhtar Senik (PAS) | 7,874 | 21.57% | 37,432 | 1,438 | 81.20% |

Perlis State Legislative Assembly
| Year | Constituency | Candidate | Votes | Pct | Opponent(s) | Votes | Pct | Ballots cast | Majority | Turnout |
|---|---|---|---|---|---|---|---|---|---|---|
| 2022 | N01 Titi Tinggi | Izizam Ibrahim (BERSATU) | 5,601 | 58.42% | Teh Chai Aan (MCA) | 1,816 | 18.94% | 9,748 | 3,785 | 72.70% |
| 2022 | N01 Titi Tinggi | Izizam Ibrahim (BERSATU) | 5,601 | 58.42% | Teh Seng Chuan (DAP) | 1,512 | 15.77% | 9,748 | 3,785 | 72.70% |
| 2022 | N01 Titi Tinggi | Izizam Ibrahim (BERSATU) | 5,601 | 58.42% | Zahidi Zainul Abidin (IND) | 425 | 4.43% | 9,748 | 3,785 | 72.70% |
| 2022 | N01 Titi Tinggi | Izizam Ibrahim (BERSATU) | 5,601 | 58.42% | Mohd Shahril Md Sarif (PEJUANG) | 152 | 1.59% | 9,748 | 3,785 | 72.70% |
| 2022 | N01 Titi Tinggi | Izizam Ibrahim (BERSATU) | 5,601 | 58.42% | Khaw Hock Kong (WARISAN) | 81 | 0.84% | 9,748 | 3,785 | 72.70% |

== Honours ==
- Malaysia
  - Medal of the Order of the Defender of the Realm (PPN) (2021)
- Perlis
  - Recipient of Tuanku Syed Sirajuddin Jamalullail Silver Jubilee Medal (2025)
