= Siti Berenee Yahaya =

Malaysian politician

- سيتي بيريني بنت يحيى

Member of the Perlis State Executive Council (Women, Family, Community Development, Community Unity, and Special Tasks)
- In office 13 June 2018 – 22 November 2022
- Monarch: Sirajuddin
- Menteri Besar: Azlan Man
- Preceded by: Rela Ahmad (Women, Family, Community Development and Community Unity); Mat Rawi Kassim (Special Tasks)
- Succeeded by: Wan Badariah Wan Saad (Women, Family and Community); Portfolios abolished (Community Unity and Special Tasks)
- Constituency: Mata Ayer

Member of the Perlis State Legislative Assembly for Mata Ayer
- In office 9 May 2018 – 19 November 2022
- Preceded by: Khairi Hasan (BN–UMNO)
- Succeeded by: Wan Badariah Wan Saad (PN–PAS)
- Majority: 720 (2018)

Faction represented in Perlis State Legislative Assembly
- 2018–2022: Barisan Nasional

Personal details
- Born: Perlis, Malaysia
- Citizenship: Malaysian
- Party: United Malays National Organisation (UMNO)
- Other political affiliations: Barisan Nasional (BN)
- Occupation: Politician

Siti Berenee binti Yahaya is a Malaysian politician who served as Member of the Perlis State Executive Council (EXCO) in the Barisan Nasional (BN) state administration under former Menteri Besar Azlan Man from June 2018 to the collapse of the BN state administration in November 2022 as well as Member of the Perlis State Legislative Assembly (MLA) for Mata Ayer from May 2018 to November 2022. She is a member of the United Malays National Organisation (UMNO), a component party of the BN coalition.

== Political career ==
=== Member of the Perlis State Executive Council (2018–2022) ===
On 13 June 2018, Siti Berenee was appointed as the Perlis State EXCO Member in charge of Women, Family, Community Development, Community Unity, and Special Tasks by Menteri Besar Azlan.

On 22 November 2022, Siti Berenee lost her position after the BN state administration collapsed following the huge defeat of BN in the 2022 Perlis state election that wiped BN out of the assembly.

=== Member of the Perlis State Legislative Assembly (2018–2022) ===
==== 2018 Perlis state election ====
In the 2018 Perlis state election, Siti Berenee made her electoral debut after being nominated by BN to contest for the Mata Ayer state seat. She won the seat and was elected into the Perlis State Legislative Assembly as the Mata Ayer MLA after defeating candidates of Pakatan Harapan (PH) and Gagasan Sejahtera (GS) by a majority of 720 votes.

==== 2022 Perlis state election ====
In the 2022 Perlis state election, Siti Berenee was renominated by BN to defend the Mata Ayer seat. She lost the seat and was not reelected as the Mata Ayer MLA for the second term after losing to Wan Badariah Wan Saad of Perikatan Nasional (PN) by a minority of 2,021 votes.

== Election results ==
Perlis State Legislative Assembly
Year	Constituency		Votes	Pct	Opponent(s)	Votes	Pct	Ballots cast	Majority	Turnout
2018	N04 Mata Ayer	Siti Berenee Yahaya (UMNO)	2,684	43.54%	Azhar Omar (BERSATU)	1,964	31.87%	6,339	720	83.22%
2018	N04 Mata Ayer	Siti Berenee Yahaya (UMNO)	2,684	43.54%	Mohammad Yahya (PAS)	1,516	24.59%	6,339	720	83.22%
2022	N04 Mata Ayer	Siti Berenee Yahaya (UMNO)	2,398	31.51%	Wan Badariah Wan Saad (PAS)	4,419	58.06%	7,611	2,021	78.77%
2022	N04 Mata Ayer	Siti Berenee Yahaya (UMNO)	2,398	31.51%	Amran Kamarudin (PKR)	794	10.43%	7,611	2,021	78.77%
