= Mohammad Azmir Azizan =

Malaysian politician and school administrator

Yang Berhormat Tuan Mohammad Azmir Azizan MLA
- محمد أزمير عزيزان

Member of the Perlis State Executive Council (Islamic Religion, Education, Youth, Sports, Human Resource Development, Information and Non-governmental Organisations)
- In office 25 November 2022 – 25 December 2025
- Monarch: Sirajuddin
- Menteri Besar: Mohd Shukri Ramli
- Preceded by: Rozaini Rais (Islamic Affairs); Rozieana Ahmad (Education, Human Resource Development and Information); Hamizan Hassan (Youth, Sports and Non-governmental Organisations)
- Succeeded by: TBA
- Constituency: Santan

Member of the Perlis State Legislative Assembly for Santan
- Incumbent
- Assumed office 19 November 2022
- Preceded by: Azizan Sulaiman (BN–UMNO)
- Majority: 2,108 (2022)

Faction represented in Perlis State Legislative Assembly
- 2022–: Perikatan Nasional

Personal details
- Born: Mohammad Azmir bin Azizan; 26 September 1980 (age 46)
- Citizenship: Malaysian
- Party: Malaysian Islamic Party (PAS)
- Other political affiliations: Perikatan Nasional (PN)
- Children: 3
- Education: Al Madrasah Al Alawiyah Ad Diniah Religious Secondary School, Arau, Perlis
- Alma mater: Al-Azhar University, Cairo, Egypt (Usuluddin Bachelor's Degree (DAKWAH))
- Occupation: Politician and school administrator

Mohammad Azmir Azizan (born 26 September 1980) is a Malaysian politician and school administrator who has served as Member of the Perlis State Legislative Assembly (MLA) for Santan since November 2022. He served as Member of the Perlis State Executive Council (EXCO) in the Perikatan Nasional (PN) state administration under Menteri Besar Mohd Shukri Ramli from November 2022 to December 2025. He is a member of the Malaysian Islamic Party (PAS), a component party of the PN coalition. He is also the State Information Chief of PAS of Perlis, State Youth Chief of PAS of Perlis, Division Deputy Chief of PAS of Padang Besar and Member of the Board of Administrators of school of PAS.

== Personal life ==
Mohammad Azmir was born on 26 September 1980. He is also married and has three children with her wife.

== Political career ==
=== Member of the Perlis State Executive Council (since 2022) ===
In the 2022 Perlis state election, the ruling Barisan Nasional (BN) suffered from huge defeat and wipeout in the assembly as none of its candidates won a state seat in the elections after losing all the 10 seats it previously held to PN. The elections ended 63-year rule of BN in the state, saw the first ever transition of power in the history of the state and replaced BN with PN as the ruling coalition and dominant political force in the state as PN won 14 out of 15 state seats and therefore two-thirds supermajority of the assembly. Therefore, State Chairman of PN of Perlis, State Commissioner of PAS of Perlis and Sanglang MLA Mohd Shukri replaced Azlan Man as the new and 10th Menteri Besar of Perlis and formed a new PN state administration on 22 November 2022. On 25 November 2022, Mohammad Azmir was appointed as the Perlis State EXCO Member in charge of Islamic Religion, Education, Youth, Sports, Human Resource Development, Information and Non-governmental Organisations (NGOs) by Menteri Besar Mohd Shukri.

=== Member of the Perlis State Legislative Assembly (since 2022) ===
==== 2022 Perlis state election ====
In the 2022 state election, Mohammad Azmir made his electoral debut after being nominated by PN to contest for the Santan state seat. He won the seat and was elected into the Perlis State Legislative Assembly as the Santan MLA after defeating EXCO Member and defending MLA Azizan Sulaiman of BN and Che Mazlina Che Yob of Pakatan Harapan (PH) by the majority of 2,108 votes.

== Other careers ==
Mohammad Azmir is also the Deputy Head of Ma'had Tahfiz, Al-Quran Al-Imam An Nawawi (MATIN), Chief of the Perlis Student Families in Egypt and Chief Advisor to the Perlis Student Families.

== Election results ==
Perlis State Legislative Assembly
Year	Constituency	Candidate	Votes	Pct	Opponent(s)	Votes	Pct	Ballots cast	Majority	Turnout
2022	N05 Santan	Mohammad Azmir Azizan (PAS)	4,752	56.40%	Azizan Sulaiman (UMNO)	2,644	31.38%	8,426	2,108	78.37%
2022	N05 Santan	Mohammad Azmir Azizan (PAS)	4,752	56.40%	Che Mazlina Che Yob (AMANAH)	1,030	12.22%	8,426	2,108	78.37%

== Honours ==
- Perlis
  - Recipient of Tuanku Syed Sirajuddin Jamalullail Silver Jubilee Medal (2025)
