= Titi Tinggi =

State constituency in Perlis, Malaysia

Titi Tinggi (N01)
Perlis constituency

State constituency
- Legislature: Perlis State Legislative Assembly
MLA
Izizam Ibrahim
PN
- Constituency created: 1974
- First contested: 1974
- Last contested: 2022

Demographics
- Electors (2022): 13,403

Titi Tinggi is a state constituency in Perlis, Malaysia, that has been represented in the Perlis State Legislative Assembly.

The state constituency was first contested in 1974 and is mandated to return a single Assemblyman to the Perlis State Legislative Assembly under the first-past-the-post voting system. Since 2022, the State Assemblyman for Titi Tinggi is Izizam Ibrahim from Perikatan Nasional (PN).

== Definition ==
=== Polling districts ===
According to the federal gazette issued on 31 October 2022, the Titi Tinggi constituency is divided into 7 polling districts.

State constituency	Polling Districts	Code	Location
Titi Tinggi (N01)	Jalan Padang Besar	001/01/01	SMK Raja Puan Muda Tengku Fauziah
Titi Tinggi (N01)	Titi Tinggi	001/01/02	SK Titi Tinggi
Titi Tinggi (N01)	FELDA Mata Ayer	001/01/03	SK (FELDA) Mata Ayer
Titi Tinggi (N01)	Kampong Kastam	001/01/04	SK Padang Besar Utara
Titi Tinggi (N01)	Padang Besar	001/01/05	SMK Padang Besar Utara
Titi Tinggi (N01)	FELDA Rimba Mas	001/01/06	SK (FELDA) Rimba Mas
Titi Tinggi (N01)	Lubok Sireh	001/01/07	SK Lubok Sireh

== Demographics ==
Ethnic breakdown of Titi Tinggi's electorate as of 2022
1. Malay (78.4%)
2. Chinese (18.3%)
3. Indian (1.95%)
4. Other ethnicities (1.34%)

Total electors by polling district in 2016
Polling district	Electors
Jalan Padang Besar	1,325
Titi Tinggi	2,196
FELDA Mata Ayer	1,008
Kampong Kastam	700
Padang Besar	2,045
FELDA Rimba Mas	1,114
Lubok Sireh	921
Total	9,309
Source: Malaysian Election Commission

== History ==
Members of the Legislative Assembly for Titi Tinggi
Assembly	No	Years	Member	Party
Constituency created from Kaki Bukit
4th	N01	1974–1978	Leong Choon Ling (梁春粦)	BN (MCA)
5th	N01	1978	Leong Choon Ling (梁春粦)	BN (MCA)
5th	N01	1978–1982	Ng Eng Toon @ Goh Eng Toon (吴英顿)	BN (MCA)
6th	N01	1982–1986	Ng Eng Toon @ Goh Eng Toon (吴英顿)	BN (MCA)
7th	N01	1986–1990	Lai Kuan Fook (赖观福)	BN (MCA)
8th	N01	1990–1995	Loh Yoon Foo (罗运富)	BN (MCA)
9th	N01	1995–1999	Loh Yoon Foo (罗运富)	BN (MCA)
10th	N01	1999–2004	Loh Yoon Foo (罗运富)	BN (MCA)
11th	N01	2004–2008	Loh Yoon Foo (罗运富)	BN (MCA)
12th	N01	2008–2013	Yip Sun Onn (叶新安)	BN (MCA)
13th	N01	2013–2018	Khaw Hock Kong (许福光)	BN (MCA)
14th	N01	2018–2022	Teh Chai Aan (郑再安)	BN (MCA)
15th	N01	2022–present	Izizam Ibrahim	PN (BERSATU)

== Election results ==
Perlis state election, 2022: Titi Tinggi
Party	Candidate	Votes	%	∆%
PN	Izizam Ibrahim	5,601	58.42	▲58.42
BN	Teh Chai Aan	1,816	18.94	▼17.24
PH	Teh Seng Chuan	1,512	15.77	▲15.77
Independent	Zahidi Zainul Abidin	425	4.43	▲4.43
PEJUANG	Mohd Shahril Md Sharif	152	1.59	▲1.59
Heritage	Khaw Hock Kong	81	0.84	▲0.84
Total valid votes		9,587	100.00	
Total rejected ballots		145		
Unreturned ballots		16		
Turnout		9,748	72.73	▼6.57
Registered electors		13,403		
Majority		3,785	39.48	▲37.66
PN gain from BN		Swing		?

Perlis state election, 2018: Titi Tinggi
Party	Candidate	Votes	%	∆%
BN	Teh Chai Aan	2,762	35.39	▼18.14
PKR	Teh Seng Chuan	2,620	33.57	▲33.57
PAS	Kamis Yub	2,291	29.36	▲29.36
Independent	Yaacob Man	132	1.68	▼11.52
Total valid votes		7,805	100.00	
Total rejected ballots		182		
Unreturned ballots		31		
Turnout		8,018	79.30	▼3.61
Registered electors		10,111		
Majority		142	1.82	▼18.45
BN hold		Swing		

Perlis state election, 2013: Titi Tinggi
Party	Candidate	Votes	%	∆%
BN	Khaw Hock Kong	3,925	53.53	▼15.06
DAP	Teh Seng Chuan	2,439	33.27	▲33.27
Independent	Yaacob Man	968	13.20	▲13.20
Total valid votes		7,332	100.00	
Total rejected ballots		224		
Unreturned ballots		38		
Turnout		7,594	82.91	▲5.42
Registered electors		9,159		
Majority		1,486	20.27	▼10.85
BN hold		Swing		
Source(s) "Federal Government Gazette - Notice of Contested Election, State Legislative Assembly for the State of Perlis [P.U. (B) 185/2013]" (PDF). Attorney General's Chambers of Malaysia. 26 April 2013. "Federal Government Gazette - Results of Contested Election and Statements of the Poll after the Official Addition of Votes, State Constituencies for the State of Perlis [P.U. (B) 226/2013]" (PDF). Attorney General's Chambers of Malaysia. 22 May 2013.

Perlis state election, 2008: Titi Tinggi
Party	Candidate	Votes	%	∆%
BN	Yip Sun Onn	3,399	68.59	▼2.72
Independent	Mohamad Razi Mustaffa	1,585	27.19	▲27.19
PKR	Keria Senawi	846	14.51	▼14.18
Total valid votes		5,830	100.00	
Total rejected ballots		206		
Unreturned ballots		32		
Turnout		6,068	77.50	▼3.71
Registered electors		7,830		
Majority		1,814	31.11	▼11.50
BN hold		Swing		

Perlis state election, 2004: Titi Tinggi
Party	Candidate	Votes	%	∆%
BN	Loh Yoon Foo	3,668	71.31	▲9.41
PKR	Ko Chu Liang	1,476	28.69	▲28.69
Total valid votes		5,144	100.00	
Total rejected ballots		253		
Unreturned ballots		196		
Turnout		5,593	81.21	▲2.89
Registered electors		6,887		
Majority		2,192	42.61	▲18.81
BN hold		Swing		

Perlis state election, 1999: Titi Tinggi
Party	Candidate	Votes	%	∆%
BN	Loh Yoon Foo	2,892	61.90	▼12.50
PAS	Ibrahim Said	1,780	38.10	▲38.10
Total valid votes		4,672	100.00	
Total rejected ballots		116		
Unreturned ballots		515		
Turnout		5,303	78.32	▲3.45
Registered electors		6,771		
Majority		1,112	23.80	▼25.00
BN hold		Swing		

Perlis state election, 1995: Titi Tinggi
Party	Candidate	Votes	%	∆%
BN	Loh Yoon Foo	3,543	74.40	▲20.92
S46	Samsudin Hamid	1,219	25.60	▼20.92
Total valid votes		4,762	100.00	
Total rejected ballots		194		
Unreturned ballots		76		
Turnout		5,032	74.87	▲1.39
Registered electors		6,721		
Majority		2,324	48.80	▲41.83
BN hold		Swing		

Perlis state election, 1990: Titi Tinggi
Party	Candidate	Votes	%	∆%
BN	Loh Yoon Foo	2,932	53.48	▼9.66
S46	Tengku Yaacob	2,550	46.52	▲46.52
Total valid votes		5,482	100.00	
Total rejected ballots		159		
Unreturned ballots		111		
Turnout		5,752	73.48	▲2.14
Registered electors		7,828		
Majority		382	6.97	▼35.13
BN hold		Swing		

Perlis state election, 1986: Titi Tinggi
Party	Candidate	Votes	%	∆%
BN	Lai Kuan Fook	2,640	63.14	▼2.98
PAS	Ishak Ismail	880	21.05	▲3.02
Independent	Loh Sin Poh	661	15.81	▲15.81
Total valid votes		4,181	100.00	
Total rejected ballots		208		
Unreturned ballots		0		
Turnout		4,389	71.34	▼1.29
Registered electors		6,152		
Majority		1,760	42.10	▼5.99
BN hold		Swing		

Perlis state election, 1982: Titi Tinggi
Party	Candidate	Votes	%	∆%
BN	Ng Eng Toon @ Goh Eng Toon	2,908	66.12	▲3.07
PAS	Salleh Yusof	793	18.03	▲1.00
DAP	Liew Sih Yang	697	15.85	▼4.07
Total valid votes		4,398	100.00	
Total rejected ballots		130		
Unreturned ballots		0		
Turnout		4,528	72.63	▲0.63
Registered electors		6,234		
Majority		2,115	48.09	▲4.96
BN hold		Swing		

Perlis state by-election, 19 August 1978: Titi Tinggi Upon the death of Leong Choon Ling
Party	Candidate	Votes	%	∆%
BN	Ng Eng Toon @ Goh Eng Toon	2,399	63.05	
DAP	Liew Sih Yang	758	19.92	
PAS	Mustaffa Ahmad	648	17.03	
Total valid votes		3,805	100.00	
Total rejected ballots		58		
Unreturned ballots		0		
Turnout		3,863	72.00	▲72.00
Registered electors		5,365		
Majority		1,641	43.13	▲43.13
BN hold		Swing		

Perlis state election, 1978: Titi Tinggi
Party	Candidate	Votes	%	∆%
On the nomination day, Leong Choon Ling won uncontested.
BN	Leong Choon Ling			
Total valid votes			100.00	
Total rejected ballots				
Unreturned ballots				
Turnout				
Registered electors		5,365		
Majority				
BN hold		Swing		

Perlis state election, 1974: Titi Tinggi
Party	Candidate	Votes	
BN	Leong Choon Ling	2,413	78.62
Parti Sosialis Rakyat Malaysia	Ng Cheng Soon	656	21.38
Total valid votes		3,069	100.00
Total rejected ballots		209	
Unreturned ballots		0	
Turnout		3,278	75.15
Registered electors		4,362	
Majority		1,757	57.25
This was a new constituency created.
