= Hamizan Hassan =

Malaysian politician

- حميدان بن حسن

Member of the Perlis State Executive Council (Utilities, Public Facilities, Transport, Youth, Sports, and Non-governmental Organisations)
- In office 13 June 2018 – 22 November 2022
- Monarch: Sirajuddin
- Menteri Besar: Azlan Man
- Preceded by: Nurulhisham Yaakob (Public Amenities and Utilities); Asmaiza Ahmad (Transport); Abdul Jamil Saad (Youth, Sports, and Non-governmental Organisations)
- Succeeded by: Izizam Ibrahim (Facilities, Infrastructure and Transport); Mohammad Azmir Azizan (Youth, Sports and Non-governmental Organisations)
- Constituency: Kayang

Member of the Perlis State Legislative Assembly for Kayang
- In office 9 May 2018 – 19 November 2022
- Preceded by: Ahmad Bakri Ali (BN–UMNO)
- Succeeded by: Asrul Aimran Abdul Jalil (PN–PAS)
- Majority: 435 (2018)

Faction represented in Perlis State Legislative Assembly
- 2018–2022: Barisan Nasional

Personal details
- Born: Perlis, Malaysia
- Citizenship: Malaysian
- Party: United Malays National Organisation (UMNO)
- Other political affiliations: Barisan Nasional (BN)
- Occupation: Politician

Hamizan bin Hassan is a Malaysian politician who served as Member of the Perlis State Executive Council (EXCO) in the Barisan Nasional (BN) state administration under former Menteri Besar Azlan Man from June 2018 to the collapse of the BN state administration in November 2022 as well as Member of the Perlis State Legislative Assembly (MLA) for Kayang from May 2018 to November 2022. He is a member of the United Malays National Organisation (UMNO), a component party of the BN coalition.

== Political career ==
=== Member of the Perlis State Executive Council (2018–2022) ===
On 13 June 2018, Hamizan was appointed as the Perlis State EXCO Member in charge of Utilities, Public Facilities, Transport, Youth, Sports and Non-governmental Organisations (NGOs) by Menteri Besar Azlan.

On 22 November 2022, Hamizan lost his position after the BN state administration collapsed following the huge defeat of BN in the 2022 Perlis state election that wiped BN out of the assembly.

=== Member of the Perlis State Legislative Assembly (2018–2022) ===
==== 2018 Perlis state election ====
In the 2018 Perlis state election, Hamizan made his electoral debut after being nominated by BN to contest for the Kayang state seat. He won the seat and was elected into the Perlis State Legislative Assembly as the Kayang MLA after narrowly defeating Abdul Hannaan Khairy of Pakatan Harapan (PH) and Md Radzi Hassan of Gagasan Sejahtera (GS) by a majority of only 435 votes.

==== 2022 Perlis state election ====
In the 2022 Perlis state election, Hamizan was renominated by BN to defend the Kayang seat. He lost the seat and was not reelected as the Kayang MLA after losing to Asrul Aimran Abdul Jalil of Perikatan Nasional (PN) by a minority of 3,261 votes.

== Election results ==
Perlis State Legislative Assembly
Year	Constituency		Votes	Pct	Opponent(s)	Votes	Pct	Ballots cast	Majority	Turnout
2018	N10 Kayang	Hamizan Hassan (UMNO)	3,275	41.09%	Abdul Hannaan Khairy (BERSATU)	2,840	35.63%	8,166	435	83.10%
2018	N10 Kayang	Hamizan Hassan (UMNO)	3,275	41.09%	Md Radzi Hassan (PAS)	1,855	23.28%	8,166	435	83.10%
2022	N10 Kayang	Hamizan Hassan (UMNO)	2,917	27.53%	Asrul Aimran Abdul Jalil (PAS)	6,178	58.31%	10,596	3,261	78.83%
2022	N10 Kayang	Hamizan Hassan (UMNO)	2,917	27.53%	Wan Kharizal Wan Kassim (AMANAH)	1,400	13.21%	10,596	3,261	78.83%
2022	N10 Kayang	Hamizan Hassan (UMNO)	2,917	27.53%	Mohd Khairuddin Abdullah (WARISAN)	101	0.95%	10,596	3,261	78.83%
