= Sena (state constituency) =

State constituency in Perlis, Malaysia

Sena (N07)
Perlis constituency

State constituency
- Legislature: Perlis State Legislative Assembly
MLA
Marzita Mansor
PN
- Constituency created: 1958
- First contested: 1959
- Last contested: 2022

Demographics
- Electors (2022): 15,870

Sena is a state constituency in Perlis, Malaysia, that has been represented in the Perlis State Legislative Assembly from 1959 to 1974 and from 1986 to the present.

The state constituency was created in 1958. It was first contested in 1959 and is mandated to return a single Assemblyman to the Perlis State Legislative Assembly under the first-past-the-post voting system. Since 2022, the State Assemblyman for Sena is Marzita Mansor from Perikatan Nasional (PN).

== Definition ==
=== Polling districts ===
According to the federal gazette issued on 31 October 2022, the Sena constituency is divided into 7 polling districts.

| State constituency | Polling Districts | Code | Location |
|---|---|---|---|
| Sena（N07） | Kampong Salang | 002/07/01 | SK Kampong Salang |
| Sena（N07） | Repoh | 002/07/02 | Kolej Vokesional Kangar |
| Sena（N07） | Alor Lanchang | 002/07/03 | SK Jejawi |
| Sena（N07） | Taman Indera | 002/07/04 | SK Seri Indera |
| Sena（N07） | Tok Peduka | 002/07/05 | SK Sena |
| Sena（N07） | Padang Bohor | 002/07/06 | SM Sains Tuanku Syed Putra |
| Sena（N07） | Padang Petani | 002/07/07 | Institut Latihan Perindustrian Kangar (ILP) |

== Demographics ==
Ethnic breakdown of Sena's electorate as of 2022
1. Malay (84.3%)
2. Chinese (8.88%)
3. Other ethnicities (4.07%)
4. Indian (2.72%)

Total electors by polling district in 2016
| Polling district | Electors |
|---|---|
| Kampong Sanglang | 1,940 |
| Repoh | 2,069 |
| Alor Lanchang | 1,505 |
| Taman Indera | 561 |
| Tok Peduka | 3,222 |
| Padang Bohor | 986 |
| Padang Petani | 537 |
| Total | 10,820 |
Source: Malaysian Election Commission

== History ==
The seat was abolished in 1974 when it was redistributed between Oran and Paya. It was re-created in 1984 from parts of Oran and Paya.

Members of the Legislative Assembly for Sena
| Assembly | No | Years | Member | Party |
Constituency created
| 1st | N05 | 1959–1964 | Wan Ahmad Wan Kassim | Alliance (UMNO) |
| 2nd | N05 | 1964–1969 | Wan Ahmad Wan Kassim | Alliance (UMNO) |
| | | 1969–1971 | Assembly dissolved | |
| 3rd | N05 | 1971–1973 | Wan Ahmad Wan Kassim | Alliance (UMNO) |
| 3rd | N05 | 1973–1974 | Wan Ahmad Wan Kassim | BN (UMNO) |
Constituency abolished, merged into Mata Ayer, Utan Aji and Bandar Arau
Constituency re-created from Bandar Kangar and Paya
| 7th | N06 | 1986–1990 | Selamat Saad | BN (UMNO) |
| 8th | N06 | 1990–1995 | Selamat Saad | BN (UMNO) |
| 9th | N07 | 1995–1999 | Selamat Saad | BN (UMNO) |
| 10th | N07 | 1999–2004 | Azihani Ali | BN (UMNO) |
| 11th | N07 | 2004–2008 | Azihani Ali | BN (UMNO) |
| 12th | N07 | 2008–2013 | Abdul Jamil Saad | BN (UMNO) |
| 13th | N07 | 2013–2018 | Abdul Jamil Saad | BN (UMNO) |
| 14th | N07 | 2018–2022 | Asrul Nizan Abd Jalil | PH (PKR) |
| 15th | N07 | 2022–present | Marzita Masnor | PN (BERSATU) |

== Election results ==
Perlis state election, 2022
| Party | Candidate | Votes | % | ∆% |
|---|---|---|---|---|
| PN | Marzita Mansor | 5,556 | 47.27 | ▲47.27 |
| PH | Asrul Nizan Abd Jalil | 3,356 | 28.55 | ▲28.55 |
| BN | Saiful Daniel Mohd Yusof | 2,619 | 22.28 | ▼16.63 |
| PEJUANG | Mohd Faizal Yunus | 222 | 1.89 | ▲1.89 |
| Total valid votes | | 11,753 | 100.00 | |
| Total rejected ballots | | 155 | | |
| Unreturned ballots | | 21 | | |
| Turnout | | 11,929 | 75.17 | ▼7.03 |
| Registered electors | | 15,870 | | |
| Majority | | 2,200 | 18.72 | ▲15.56 |
| PN gain from PKR | | Swing | | ? |

Perlis state election, 2018
| Party | Candidate | Votes | % | ∆% |
|---|---|---|---|---|
| PKR | Asrul Nizan Abd Jalil | 4,177 | 42.07 | ▲4.23 |
| BN | Azihani Ali | 3,863 | 38.91 | ▼19.77 |
| PAS | Fakhrul Anwar Ismail | 1,888 | 19.02 | ▲19.02 |
| Total valid votes | | 9,928 | 100.00 | |
| Total rejected ballots | | 116 | | |
| Unreturned ballots | | 69 | | |
| Turnout | | 10,113 | 82.20 | ▼2.04 |
| Registered electors | | 12,303 | | |
| Majority | | 314 | 3.16 | ▼17.68 |
| PKR gain from BN | | Swing | | ? |

Perlis state election, 2013
| Party | Candidate | Votes | % | ∆% |
|---|---|---|---|---|
| BN | Abdul Jamil Saad | 5,418 | 58.68 | ▼3.74 |
| PKR | Tuan Marja Tuan Mat | 3,494 | 37.84 | ▲37.84 |
| Independent | Ahmad Rizal Effande Zainol | 321 | 3.48 | ▲3.48 |
| Total valid votes | | 9,233 | 100.00 | |
| Total rejected ballots | | 177 | | |
| Unreturned ballots | | 20 | | |
| Turnout | | 9,430 | 84.24 | ▲3.10 |
| Registered electors | | 11,194 | | |
| Majority | | 1,924 | 20.84 | ▼4.00 |
| BN hold | | Swing | | |
Source(s) "Federal Government Gazette - Notice of Contested Election, State Legislative Assembly for the State of Perlis [P.U. (B) 185/2013]" (PDF). Attorney General's Chambers of Malaysia. 26 April 2013. "Federal Government Gazette - Results of Contested Election and Statements of the Poll after the Official Addition of Votes, State Constituencies for the State of Perlis [P.U. (B) 226/2013]" (PDF). Attorney General's Chambers of Malaysia. 22 May 2013.

Perlis state election, 2008
| Party | Candidate | Votes | % | ∆% |
|---|---|---|---|---|
| BN | Abdul Jamil Saad | 4,697 | 62.42 | ▲0.08 |
| PAS | Osman Abdullah | 2,828 | 37.58 | ▼0.08 |
| Total valid votes | | 7,525 | 100.00 | |
| Total rejected ballots | | 161 | | |
| Unreturned ballots | | 107 | | |
| Turnout | | 7,793 | 81.14 | ▼0.27 |
| Registered electors | | 9,604 | | |
| Majority | | 1,869 | 24.84 | ▲0.16 |
| BN hold | | Swing | | |

Perlis state election, 2004
| Party | Candidate | Votes | % | ∆% |
|---|---|---|---|---|
| BN | Azihani Ali | 4,001 | 62.34 | ▲7.71 |
| PAS | Ahmad Adnan Fadzil | 2,417 | 37.66 | ▼7.71 |
| Total valid votes | | 6,418 | 100.00 | |
| Total rejected ballots | | 72 | | |
| Unreturned ballots | | 6 | | |
| Turnout | | 6,496 | 81.41 | ▲0.51 |
| Registered electors | | 7,979 | | |
| Majority | | 1,584 | 24.68 | ▲15.43 |
| BN hold | | Swing | | |

Perlis state election, 1999
| Party | Candidate | Votes | % | ∆% |
|---|---|---|---|---|
| BN | Azihani Ali | 3,211 | 54.63 | ▼14.15 |
| PAS | Mohammad Faisol Abd. Rahman | 2,667 | 45.37 | ▲14.15 |
| Total valid votes | | 5,878 | 100.00 | |
| Total rejected ballots | | 107 | | |
| Unreturned ballots | | 75 | | |
| Turnout | | 6,060 | 80.91 | ▲6.28 |
| Registered electors | | 7,490 | | |
| Majority | | 544 | 9.25 | ▼28.30 |
| BN hold | | Swing | | |

Perlis state election, 1995
| Party | Candidate | Votes | % | ∆% |
|---|---|---|---|---|
| BN | Selamat Saad | 3,630 | 68.78 | ▼5.01 |
| PAS | Aziz Shariff | 1,648 | 31.22 | ▲5.01 |
| Total valid votes | | 5,278 | 100.00 | |
| Total rejected ballots | | 102 | | |
| Unreturned ballots | | 0 | | |
| Turnout | | 5,380 | 74.63 | ▼0.36 |
| Registered electors | | 7,209 | | |
| Majority | | 1,982 | 37.55 | ▼10.03 |
| BN hold | | Swing | | |

Perlis state election, 1990
| Party | Candidate | Votes | % | ∆% |
|---|---|---|---|---|
| BN | Selamat Saad | 3,348 | 73.79 | ▲8.58 |
| PAS | Shuib Mohamad | 1,189 | 26.21 | ▼8.58 |
| Total valid votes | | 4,537 | 100.00 | |
| Total rejected ballots | | 131 | | |
| Unreturned ballots | | 16 | | |
| Turnout | | 4,684 | 74.99 | ▲4.98 |
| Registered electors | | 6,246 | | |
| Majority | | 2,159 | 47.59 | ▲17.17 |
| BN hold | | Swing | | |

Perlis state election, 1986
| Party | Candidate | Votes | % | ∆% |
|---|---|---|---|---|
| BN | Selamat Saad | 2,459 | 65.21 | ▲65.21 |
| PAS | Shuib Mohamad | 1,312 | 34.79 | ▼11.79 |
| Total valid votes | | 3,771 | 100.00 | |
| Total rejected ballots | | 131 | | |
| Unreturned ballots | | 0 | | |
| Turnout | | 3,902 | 70.02 | |
| Registered electors | | 5,573 | | |
| Majority | | 1,147 | 30.42 | |
| BN hold | | Swing | | ? |

Perlis state election, 1969
| Party | Candidate | Votes | % | ∆% |
|---|---|---|---|---|
| Alliance | Wan Ahmad Wan Kassim | 1,594 | 53.42 | ▼8.67 |
| PMIP | Mahmood Mohd Noor | 1,390 | 46.58 | ▲8.67 |
| Total valid votes | | 2,984 | 100.00 | |
| Total rejected ballots | | 233 | | |
| Unreturned ballots | | 0 | | |
| Turnout | | 3,217 | 84.06 | ▼0.46 |
| Registered electors | | 3,827 | | |
| Majority | | 204 | 6.84 | ▼17.34 |
| Alliance hold | | Swing | | |

Perlis state election, 1964
| Party | Candidate | Votes | % | ∆% |
|---|---|---|---|---|
| Alliance | Wan Ahmad Wan Kassim | 1,571 | 62.09 | ▼4.87 |
| PMIP | Mahmood Mohd Noor | 959 | 37.91 | ▲4.87 |
| Total valid votes | | 2,530 | 100.00 | |
| Total rejected ballots | | 146 | | |
| Unreturned ballots | | 0 | | |
| Turnout | | 2,676 | 84.52 | ▲2.08 |
| Registered electors | | 3,166 | | |
| Majority | | 612 | 24.18 | ▼9.74 |
| Alliance hold | | Swing | | |

Perlis state election, 1959
| Party | Candidate | Votes | % |
|---|---|---|---|
| Alliance | Wan Ahmad Wan Kassim | 1,654 | 66.96 |
| PMIP | Mat Mohd Isa | 816 | 33.04 |
| Total valid votes | | 2,470 | 100.00 |
| Total rejected ballots | | 23 | |
| Unreturned ballots | | 0 | |
| Turnout | | 2,493 | 82.44 |
| Registered electors | | 3,024 | |
| Majority | | 838 | 33.92 |
This was a new constituency created.
