= Mata Ayer (state constituency) =

State constituency in Perlis, Malaysia

Mata Ayer (N04)
Perlis constituency

State constituency
- Legislature: Perlis State Legislative Assembly
MLA
Vacant
- Constituency created: 1958
- Constituency abolished: 1974
- Constituency re-created: 1994
- First contested: 1959
- Last contested: 2022

Demographics
- Electors (2022): 9,662

Mata Ayer is a state constituency in Perlis, Malaysia, that has been represented in the Perlis State Legislative Assembly from 1959 to 1974 and from 1995 to present.

The state constituency was first contested in 1959 and is mandated to return a single Assemblyman to the Perlis State Legislative Assembly under the first-past-the-post voting system. Since 2022, the State Assemblywoman for Mata Ayer is Wan Badariah Wan Saad from Perikatan Nasional (PN).

== Definition ==
=== Polling districts ===
According to the federal gazette issued on 31 October 2022, the Maya Ayer constituency is divided into 3 polling districts.

State constituency	Polling Districts	Code	Location
Mata Ayer（N04）	Tok Kaya Man	001/04/01	SK Dato Kayaman
Mata Ayer（N04）	Hutan Temin	001/04/02	SK Oran
Mata Ayer（N04）	Kampung Gial	001/04/03	SJK (C) Kong Aik

== Demographics ==
Ethnic breakdown of Mata Ayer's electorate as of 2022
1. Malay (91.0%)
2. Other ethnicities (5.74%)
3. Chinese (2.44%)
4. Indian (0.86%)

Total electors by polling district in 2016
Polling district	Electors
Tok Kaya Man	3,209
Hutan Temin	1,728
Kampung Gial	1,542
Total	6,479
Source: Malaysian Election Commission

=== Representation history ===
Members of the Legislative Assembly for Mata Ayer
Assembly	No	Years	Member	Party
Constituency created
1st	N03	1959–1964	Mahayuddin Habib	Alliance (UMNO)
2nd	N03	1964–1969	Abdullah Hassan	Alliance (UMNO)
		1969–1971	Assembly dissolved	
3rd	N03	1971–1973	Abdullah Hassan	Alliance (UMNO)
3rd	N03	1973–1974	Abdullah Hassan	BN (UMNO)
Constituency abolished, split into Chuping and Oran
Constituency re-created from Padang Pauh and Oran
9th	N05	1995–1999	Ishak Arshad	BN (UMNO)
10th	N05	1999–2004	Ishak Arshad	BN (UMNO)
11th	N05	2004–2008	Khairi Hasan	BN (UMNO)
12th	N05	2008–2013	Khairi Hasan	BN (UMNO)
13th	N05	2013–2018	Khairi Hasan	BN (UMNO)
14th	N05	2018–2022	Siti Berenee Yahaya	BN (UMNO)
15th	N05	2022–2026	Wan Badariah Wan Saad	PN (PAS)
15th	N05	2026–present	Vacant	

== Election results ==
Perlis state election, 2022
Party	Candidate	Votes	%	∆%
PN	Wan Badariah Wan Saad	4,419	58.06	▲58.06
BN	Siti Berenee Yahaya	2,398	31.51	▼12.03
PH	Amran Kamarudin	794	10.43	▲10.43
Total valid votes		7,611	100.00	
Total rejected ballots		121		
Unreturned ballots		18		
Turnout		7,750	80.21	▼3.01
Registered electors		9,662		
Majority		2,021	26.55	▲14.87
PN gain from BN		Swing		?

Perlis state election, 2018
Party	Candidate	Votes	%	∆%
BN	Siti Berenee Yahaya	2,684	43.54	▼24.58
PKR	Azhar Omar	1,964	31.87	▼0.01
PAS	Mohammad Yahya	1,516	24.59	▲24.59
Total valid votes		6,164	100.00	
Total rejected ballots		146		
Unreturned ballots		29		
Turnout		6,339	83.22	▼4.63
Registered electors		7,617		
Majority		720	11.68	▼24.56
BN hold		Swing		

Perlis state election, 2013
Party	Candidate	Votes	%	∆%
BN	Khairi Hasan	3,739	68.12	▲0.08
PKR	Ammar Gazali	1,750	31.88	▲31.88
Total valid votes		5,489	100.00	
Total rejected ballots		86		
Unreturned ballots		17		
Turnout		5,592	87.86	▲3.81
Registered electors		6,365		
Majority		1,989	36.24	▲0.16
BN hold		Swing		
Source(s) "Federal Government Gazette - Notice of Contested Election, State Legislative Assembly for the State of Perlis [P.U. (B) 185/2013]" (PDF). Attorney General's Chambers of Malaysia. 26 April 2013. "Federal Government Gazette - Results of Contested Election and Statements of the Poll after the Official Addition of Votes, State Constituencies for the State of Perlis [P.U. (B) 226/2013]" (PDF). Attorney General's Chambers of Malaysia. 22 May 2013.

Perlis state election, 2008
Party	Candidate	Votes	%	∆%
BN	Khairi Hasan	3,059	68.04	▲0.15
PAS	Wan Kharizal Wan Khazim	1,437	31.96	▼0.15
Total valid votes		4,496	100.00	
Total rejected ballots		98		
Unreturned ballots		68		
Turnout		4,662	84.05	▲1.93
Registered electors		5,547		
Majority		1,622	36.08	▲0.29
BN hold		Swing		

Perlis state election, 2004
Party	Candidate	Votes	%	∆%
BN	Khairi Hasan	3,041	67.89	▲9.09
PAS	Suwardi Yaacob	1,438	32.11	▼9.09
Total valid votes		4,479	100.00	
Total rejected ballots		56		
Unreturned ballots		28		
Turnout		4,563	82.11	▼1.76
Registered electors		5,557		
Majority		1,603	35.79	▲18.19
BN hold		Swing		

Perlis state election, 1999
Party	Candidate	Votes	%	∆%
BN	Ishak Arshad	2,218	58.80	▼12.14
PAS	Suwardi Yaacob	1,554	41.20	▲12.14
Total valid votes		3,772	100.00	
Total rejected ballots		71		
Unreturned ballots		250		
Turnout		4,093	83.87	▲0.89
Registered electors		4,880		
Majority		664	17.60	▼24.28
BN hold		Swing		

Perlis state election, 1995
Party	Candidate	Votes	%	∆%
BN	Ishak Arshad	2,886	70.94	▲70.94
PAS	Saleh Itam	1,182	29.06	▼16.93
Total valid votes		4,068	100.00	
Total rejected ballots		323		
Unreturned ballots		588		
Turnout		4,979	82.98	
Registered electors		6,000		
Majority		1,704	41.89	
BN hold		Swing		

Perlis state election, 1969
Party	Candidate	Votes	%	∆%
Alliance	Abdullah Hassan	1,623	47.48	▼11.18
PMIP	Amin Ishak	1,572	45.99	▲4.65
Parti Rakyat Malaysia	Wan Khazim @ Wan Hussin Wan Din	223	6.52	▲6.52
Total valid votes		3,418	100.00	
Total rejected ballots		220		
Unreturned ballots		0		
Turnout		3,638	82.21	▼1.06
Registered electors		4,425		
Majority		51	1.49	▼15.82
Alliance hold		Swing		

Perlis state election, 1964
Party	Candidate	Votes	%	∆%
Alliance	Abdullah Hassan	1,738	58.66	▼3.13
PMIP	Ismail Mohamad	1,225	41.34	▲41.34
Total valid votes		2,963	100.00	
Total rejected ballots		229		
Unreturned ballots		0		
Turnout		3,192	83.28	▲3.35
Registered electors		3,833		
Majority		513	17.31	▼15.36
Alliance hold		Swing		

Perlis state election, 1959
Party	Candidate	Votes	%
Alliance	Mahayuddin Habib	1,509	61.79
Independent	Shaik Ali Bajunid	711	29.12
Socialist Front	Wan Khazim @ Wan Hussin Wan Din	222	9.09
Total valid votes		2,442	100.00
Total rejected ballots		130	
Unreturned ballots		0	
Turnout		2,572	79.93
Registered electors		3,218	
Majority		798	32.68
This was a new constituency created.
