= Chuping (state constituency) =

State constituency in Perlis, Malaysia

Chuping (N03)
Perlis constituency

State constituency
- Legislature: Perlis State Legislative Assembly
MLA
Vacant
- Constituency created: 1974
- First contested: 1974
- Last contested: 2022

Demographics
- Electors (2022): 14,248

Chuping is a state constituency in Perlis, Malaysia, that has been represented in the Perlis State Legislative Assembly from 1974 to 1986 and from 1995 to present.

The state constituency was first contested in 1986 and is mandated to return a single Assemblyman to the Perlis State Legislative Assembly under the first-past-the-post voting system. Since 2022, the State Assemblyman for Chuping is Saad Seman from Perikatan Nasional (PN).

== Definition ==
=== Polling districts ===
According to the federal gazette issued on 31 October 2022, the Chuping constituency is divided into 6 polling districts.

State constituency	Polling Districts	Code	Location
Chuping（N03）	Panggas	001/03/01	SMK Datuk Jaafar Hasan
Chuping（N03）	Sungai Buloh	001/03/02	SK Batu Bertangkup
Chuping（N03）	Kilang Gula Chuping	001/03/03	SR Islam III
Chuping（N03）	Kubang Perun	001/03/04	SMK Guar Nangka
Chuping（N03）	Guar Nangka	001/03/05	SK Guar Nangka
Chuping（N03）	FELDA Chuping	001/03/06	SK (FELDA) Chuping

== Demographics ==
Ethnic breakdown of Chuping's electorate as of 2022
1. Malay (83.4%)
2. Other ethnicities (14.0%)
3. Chinese (2.05%)
4. Indian (0.55%)

Total electors by polling district in 2016
Polling district	Electors
Panggas	2,747
Sungai Buloh	1,745
Kilang Gula Chuping	417
Kubang Perun	1,627
Guar Nangka	1,372
FELDA Chuping	1,964
Total	9,872
Source: Malaysian Election Commission

== History ==
Members of the Legislative Assembly for Chuping
Assembly	No	Years	Member	Party
Constituency created from Kaki Bukit, Mata Ayer and Kurong Anai
4th	N02	1974–1978	Ahmad Said	BN (UMNO)
5th	N02	1978–1982	Ahmad Said	BN (UMNO)
6th	N02	1982–1986	Shaari Jusoh	BN (UMNO)
Constituency abolished, split into Oran and Beseri
Constituency re-created from Oran
9th	N03	1995–1999	Yazid Mat	BN (UMNO)
10th	N03	1999–2004	Yazid Mat	BN (UMNO)
11th	N03	2004–2008	Mansor Jusoh	BN (UMNO)
12th	N03	2008–2013	Mansor Jusoh	BN (UMNO)
13th	N03	2013–2018	Asmaiza Ahmad	BN (UMNO)
14th	N03	2018–2022	Asmaiza Ahmad	BN (UMNO)
15th	N03	2022–2025	Saad Seman	PN (PAS)
15th	N03	2025	Saad Seman	Independent
15th	N03	2025–present	Vacant	

== Election results ==
Perlis state election, 2022
Party	Candidate	Votes	%	∆%
PN	Saad Seman	5,873	53.74	▲53.74
BN	Asmaiza Ahmad	3,453	31.60	▼15.12
PH	Natthavuth Seng	1,602	14.66	▼15.44
Total valid votes		10,928	100.00	
Total rejected ballots		170		
Unreturned ballots		13		
Turnout		11,111	77.98	▼3.82
Registered electors		14,248		
Majority		2,420	22.14	▲5.83
PN gain from BN		Swing		?

Perlis state election, 2018
Party	Candidate	Votes	%	∆%
BN	Asmaiza Ahmad	3,889	46.42	▼20.50
PKR	Poziyah Hamzah	2,522	30.10	▼2.98
PAS	Mohd Ali Puteh	1,967	23.48	▲23.48
Total valid votes		8,378	100.00	
Total rejected ballots		221		
Unreturned ballots		25		
Turnout		8,624	81.81	▼6.35
Registered electors		10,542		
Majority		1,367	16.32	▼17.52
BN hold		Swing		

Perlis state election, 2013
Party	Candidate	Votes	%	∆%
BN	Asmaiza Ahmad	5,688	66.92	▼2.71
PKR	Wan Mohamad Fishaal Wan Daud	2,812	33.08	▲33.08
Total valid votes		8,500	100.00	
Total rejected ballots		165		
Unreturned ballots		17		
Turnout		8,682	88.16	▲5.43
Registered electors		9,848		
Majority		2,876	33.84	▼5.42
BN hold		Swing		
Source(s) "Federal Government Gazette - Notice of Contested Election, State Legislative Assembly for the State of Perlis [P.U. (B) 185/2013]" (PDF). Attorney General's Chambers of Malaysia. 26 April 2013. "Federal Government Gazette - Results of Contested Election and Statements of the Poll after the Official Addition of Votes, State Constituencies for the State of Perlis [P.U. (B) 226/2013]" (PDF). Attorney General's Chambers of Malaysia. 22 May 2013.

Perlis state election, 2008
Party	Candidate	Votes	%	∆%
BN	Mansor Jusoh	4,972	69.63	▲0.23
PAS	Mohd. Ali Puteh	2,169	30.37	▼0.23
Total valid votes		7,141	100.00	
Total rejected ballots		151		
Unreturned ballots		9		
Turnout		7,301	82.73	▼4.39
Registered electors		8,825		
Majority		2,803	39.25	▲0.44
BN hold		Swing		

Perlis state election, 2004
Party	Candidate	Votes	%	∆%
BN	Mansor Jusoh	4,632	69.40	▲9.32
PAS	Mohd. Ali Puteh	2,042	30.60	▼9.32
Total valid votes		6,674	100.00	
Total rejected ballots		122		
Unreturned ballots		1		
Turnout		6,797	87.12	▲1.81
Registered electors		7,802		
Majority		2,590	38.81	▲18.65
BN hold		Swing		

Perlis state election, 1999
Party	Candidate	Votes	%	∆%
BN	Yaziz @ Yazid Mat	3,756	60.08	▼10.56
PAS	Wan Kharizal Wan Khazim	2,496	39.92	▲10.56
Total valid votes		6,252	100.00	
Total rejected ballots		146		
Unreturned ballots		1		
Turnout		6,399	85.31	▲2.47
Registered electors		7,501		
Majority		1,260	20.15	▼21.13
BN hold		Swing		

Perlis state election, 1995
Party	Candidate	Votes	%	∆%
BN	Yaziz @ Yazid Mat	3,756	60.08	▼10.56
PAS	Wan Kharizal Wan Khazim	2,496	39.92	▲10.56
Total valid votes		5,838	100.00	
Total rejected ballots		133		
Unreturned ballots		1		
Turnout		5,972	82.84	▲1.02
Registered electors		7,209		
Majority		2,410	41.28	▼0.82
BN hold		Swing		

Perlis state election, 1995
Party	Candidate	Votes	%	∆%
BN	Yaziz @ Yazid Mat	4,124	70.64	▲70.64
PAS	Yahaya Ahmad	1,714	29.36	▼29.36
Total valid votes		5,838	100.00	
Total rejected ballots		133		
Unreturned ballots		1		
Turnout		5,972	82.84	
Registered electors		7,209		
Majority		2,410	41.28	
BN hold		Swing		

Perlis state election, 1982
Party	Candidate	Votes	%	∆%
BN	Shaari Jusoh	3,777	63.67	▲9.65
PAS	Mustapha Ahmad	2,155	36.33	▼9.65
Total valid votes		5,932	100.00	
Total rejected ballots		178		
Unreturned ballots		0		
Turnout		6,110	78.54	▲0.99
Registered electors		7,779		
Majority		1,622	27.34	▲19.30
BN hold		Swing		

Perlis state election, 1978
Party	Candidate	Votes	%	∆%
BN	Ahmad Said	2,641	54.02	▼9.80
PAS	Hassan Othman	2,248	45.98	▲45.98
Total valid votes		4,889	100.00	
Total rejected ballots		319		
Unreturned ballots		0		
Turnout		5,208	77.56	▼1.28
Registered electors		6,715		
Majority		393	8.04	▼27.05
BN hold		Swing		

Perlis state election, 1974
Party	Candidate	Votes	%
BN	Ahmad Said	2,470	63.82
Independent	Ya Ali	1,112	28.73
Parti Rakyat Malaysia	Mohamed Liguan Darus	288	7.44
Total valid votes		3,870	100.00
Total rejected ballots		325	
Unreturned ballots		0	
Turnout		4,195	78.84
Registered electors		5,321	
Majority		1,358	35.09
This was a new constituency created.
