= Kayang =

Electoral district in Perlis, Malaysia

Kayang (N10)
Perlis constituency

State constituency
- Legislature: Perlis State Legislative Assembly
MLA
Asrul Aimran Abd Jalil
PN
- Constituency created: 1958
- First contested: 1959
- Last contested: 2022

Demographics
- Electors (2022): 13,441

Kayang is a state constituency in Perlis, Malaysia, that has been represented in the Perlis State Legislative Assembly.

The state constituency was created in 1958. It was first contested in 1959 and is mandated to return a single Assemblyman to the Perlis State Legislative Assembly under the first-past-the-post voting system. Since 2022, the State Assemblyman for Kayang is Asrul Aimran Abdul Jalil from Perikatan Nasional (PN).

== Definition ==
=== Polling districts ===
According to the federal gazette issued on 31 October 2022, the Kayang constituency is divided into 6 polling districts.

State constituency	Polling Districts	Code	Location
Kayang (N10)	Titi Tok Bandar	002/10/01	SK Panggau
Kayang (N10)	Bangsai Lebah	002/10/02	SK Kayang
Kayang (N10)	Temak	002/10/03	SK Dato Wan Ahmad
Kayang (N10)	Seriab	002/10/04	SMK Dato' Ali Ahmad
Kayang (N10)	Gunong Utan Aji	002/10/05	SMK Syed Alwi
Kayang (N10)	Hujung Batu	002/10/06	SK Ujong Batu

== Demographics ==
Ethnic breakdown of Kayang's electorate as of 2022
1. Malay (95.8%)
2. Chinese (2.05%)
3. Other ethnicities (1.78%)
4. Indian (0.36%)

Total electors by polling district in 2016
Polling district	Electors
Titi Tok Bandar	1,023
Bangsal Lebah	1,935
Temak	1,709
Seriab	1,395
Gunong Utan Aji	1,885
Hujung Batu	1,003
Total	8,950
Source: Malaysian Election Commission

== History ==
Members of the Legislative Assembly for Kayang
Assembly	No	Years	Member	Party
Constituency created
1st	N10	1959–1964	Keria Wan Nik	Alliance (UMNO)
2nd	N10	1964–1969	Yusoff Abu Bakar	Alliance (UMNO)
		1969–1971	Assembly dissolved	
3rd	N10	1971–1973	Yusoff Abu Bakar	Alliance (UMNO)
3rd	N10	1973–1974	Yusoff Abu Bakar	BN (UMNO)
4th	N08	1974–1978	Hazim Abu Bakar	BN (UMNO)
5th	N08	1978–1982	Hazim Abu Bakar	BN (UMNO)
6th	N08	1982–1986	Talib Ali	BN (UMNO)
7th	N09	1986–1990	Talib Ali	BN (UMNO)
8th	N09	1990–1995	Ramlah @ Che Ah Long	BN (UMNO)
9th	N10	1995–1999	Mohamad Hadzi Nordin	BN (UMNO)
10th	N10	1999–2004	Mohamad Hadzi Nordin	BN (UMNO)
11th	N10	2004–2008	Azam Rashid	BN (UMNO)
12th	N10	2008–2013	Ahmad Bakri Ali	BN (UMNO)
13th	N10	2013–2018	Ahmad Bakri Ali	BN (UMNO)
14th	N10	2018–2022	Hamizan Hassan	BN (UMNO)
15th	N10	2022–present	Asrul Aimran Abd Jalil	PN (PAS)

== Election results ==
Perlis state election, 2022: Kayang
Party	Candidate	Votes	%	∆%
PN	Asrul Aimran	6,178	58.31	▲58.31
BN	Hamizan Hassan	2,917	27.53	▼11.92
PH	Wan Kharizal Wan Khazim	1,400	13.21	▲13.21
Heritage	Khairuddin Abdullah	101	0.95	▲0.95
Total valid votes		10,596	100.00	
Total rejected ballots		126		
Unreturned ballots		22		
Turnout		10,744	79.93	▼3.16
Registered electors		13,441		
Majority		3,261	30.78	▲25.32
PN gain from BN		Swing		?

Perlis state election, 2018: Kayang
Party	Candidate	Votes	%	∆%
BN	Hamizan Hassan	3,275	41.09	▼13.14
PKR	Abdul Hannaan Khairy	2,840	35.63	▲35.63
PAS	Md Radzi Hassan	1,855	23.28	▼22.49
Total valid votes		7,970	100.00	
Total rejected ballots		163		
Unreturned ballots		33		
Turnout		8,166	83.10	▼4.10
Registered electors		9,827		
Majority		435	5.46	▼3.00
BN hold		Swing		

Perlis state election, 2013: Kayang
Party	Candidate	Votes	%	∆%
BN	Ahmad Bakri Ali	4,259	54.23	▼7.70
PAS	Ya'akub Abu Seman	3,595	45.77	▲7.70
Total valid votes		7,854	100.00	
Total rejected ballots		130		
Unreturned ballots		17		
Turnout		8,001	87.19	▲4.56
Registered electors		9,176		
Majority		664	8.45	▼15.41
BN hold		Swing		
Source(s) "Federal Government Gazette - Notice of Contested Election, State Legislative Assembly for the State of Perlis [P.U. (B) 185/2013]" (PDF). Attorney General's Chambers of Malaysia. 26 April 2013. "Federal Government Gazette - Results of Contested Election and Statements of the Poll after the Official Addition of Votes, State Constituencies for the State of Perlis [P.U. (B) 226/2013]" (PDF). Attorney General's Chambers of Malaysia. 22 May 2013.

Perlis state election, 2008: Kayang
Party	Candidate	Votes	%	∆%
BN	Ahmad Bakri Ali	3,913	61.93	▲1.02
PAS	Ya'akub Abu Seman	2,405	38.07	▼1.02
Total valid votes		6,318	100.00	
Total rejected ballots		113		
Unreturned ballots		12		
Turnout		6,443	82.63	▼2.49
Registered electors		7,797		
Majority		1,508	23.87	▲2.05
BN hold		Swing		

Perlis state election, 2004: Kayang
Party	Candidate	Votes	%	∆%
BN	Azam Rashid	3,705	60.91	▲7.80
PAS	Ku Mahmood Ku Ismail	2,378	39.09	▼7.80
Total valid votes		6,083	100.00	
Total rejected ballots		118		
Unreturned ballots		55		
Turnout		6,256	85.13	▲2.09
Registered electors		7,349		
Majority		1,327	21.81	▲15.59
BN hold		Swing		

Perlis state election, 1999: Kayang
Party	Candidate	Votes	%	∆%
BN	Mohamad Hadzi Nordin	2,825	53.11	▼15.50
PAS	Marzukhi Othman	2,494	46.89	▲15.50
Total valid votes		5,319	100.00	
Total rejected ballots		139		
Unreturned ballots		6		
Turnout		5,464	83.04	▲7.57
Registered electors		6,580		
Majority		331	6.22	▼30.99
BN hold		Swing		

Perlis state election, 1995: Kayang
Party	Candidate	Votes	%	∆%
BN	Mohamad Hadzi Nordin	3,311	68.61	▲3.42
PAS	Kamaruddin Mohd Akib	1,515	31.39	▲31.39
Total valid votes		4,826	100.00	
Total rejected ballots		93		
Unreturned ballots		0		
Turnout		4,919	75.47	▲0.01
Registered electors		6,518		
Majority		1,796	37.22	▲6.83
BN hold		Swing		

Perlis state election, 1990: Kayang
Party	Candidate	Votes	%	∆%
BN	Ramlah @ Che Ah Long	3,051	65.19	▼0.93
S46	Md. Zain Hamzah	1,629	34.81	▲34.81
Total valid votes		4,680	100.00	
Total rejected ballots		223		
Unreturned ballots		5		
Turnout		4,908	75.46	▲2.09
Registered electors		6,504		
Majority		1,422	30.38	▼1.86
BN hold		Swing		

Perlis state election, 1986: Kayang
Party	Candidate	Votes	%	∆%
BN	Talib Ali	2,834	66.12	▲6.04
PAS	Othman Ghazali	1,452	33.88	▼6.04
Total valid votes		4,286	100.00	
Total rejected ballots		195		
Unreturned ballots		0		
Turnout		4,481	73.37	▼2.36
Registered electors		6,107		
Majority		1,382	32.24	▲12.09
BN hold		Swing		

Perlis state election, 1982: Kayang
Party	Candidate	Votes	%	∆%
BN	Talib Ali	2,718	60.08	▲3.30
PAS	Mohamad Hussain Abdullah	1,806	39.92	▲6.18
Total valid votes		4,524	100.00	
Total rejected ballots		93		
Unreturned ballots		0		
Turnout		4,617	75.74	▼0.41
Registered electors		6,096		
Majority		912	20.16	▼2.88
BN hold		Swing		

Perlis state election, 1978: Kayang
Party	Candidate	Votes	%	∆%
BN	Hazim Abu Bakar	2,223	56.78	▼7.34
PAS	Ahmad Amin Idni	1,321	33.74	▲33.74
Independent	Hasan Man	371	9.48	▲9.48
Total valid votes		3,915	100.00	
Total rejected ballots		209		
Unreturned ballots		0		
Turnout		4,124	76.14	▲2.34
Registered electors		5,416		
Majority		902	23.04	▼5.19
BN hold		Swing		

Perlis state election, 1974: Kayang
Party	Candidate	Votes	%	∆%
BN	Hazim Abu Bakar	2,012	64.12	▲64.12
Independent	Ahmad Amin Idni	1,126	35.88	▲35.88
Total valid votes		3,138	100.00	
Total rejected ballots		307		
Unreturned ballots		0		
Turnout		3,445	73.80	▼2.91
Registered electors		4,668		
Majority		886	28.23	▲20.67
BN hold		Swing		?

Perlis state election, 1969: Kayang
Party	Candidate	Votes	%	∆%
Alliance	Yusoff Abu Bakar	1,805	53.78	▼6.59
PMIP	Yahaya Baginda	1,551	46.22	▲6.59
Total valid votes		3,356	100.00	
Total rejected ballots		192		
Unreturned ballots		0		
Turnout		3,548	76.71	▼3.57
Registered electors		4,625		
Majority		254	7.57	▼13.17
Alliance hold		Swing		

Perlis state election, 1964: Kayang
Party	Candidate	Votes	%	∆%
Alliance	Yusoff Abu Bakar	1,706	60.37	▲1.68
PMIP	Abu Bakar Awang	1,120	39.63	▲4.98
Total valid votes		2,826	100.00	
Total rejected ballots		158		
Unreturned ballots		0		
Turnout		2,984	80.28	▼2.01
Registered electors		3,717		
Majority		586	20.74	▼3.31
Alliance hold		Swing		

Perlis state election, 1959: Kayang
Party	Candidate	Votes	%
Alliance	Keria Wan Nik	1,506	58.69
PMIP	Abu Bakar Awang	889	34.65
Socialist Front	Zakaria Ishak	171	6.66
Total valid votes		2,566	100.00
Total rejected ballots		46	
Unreturned ballots		0	
Turnout		2,612	82.29
Registered electors		3,174	
Majority		617	24.05
This was a new constituency created.
