= Beseri (state constituency) =

Constituency in Perlis, Malaysia

Beseri (N02)
Perlis constituency

State constituency
- Legislature: Perlis State Legislative Assembly
MLA
Haziq Asyraf Dun
PN
- Constituency created: 1984
- First contested: 1986
- Last contested: 2022

Demographics
- Electors (2022): 12,128

Beseri is a state constituency in Perlis, Malaysia, that has been represented in the Perlis State Legislative Assembly.

The state constituency was first contested in 1986 and is mandated to return a single member to the Perlis State Legislative Assembly under the first-past-the-post voting system. Since 2022, the State Assembly member for Beseri is Haziq Asyraf Dun from Perikatan Nasional (PN).

== Definition ==
=== Polling districts ===
According to the federal gazette issued on 31 October 2022, the Beseri constituency is divided into 5 polling districts.

| State constituency | Polling Districts | Code | Location |
|---|---|---|---|
| Beseri（N02） | Pekan Kaki Bukit | 001/02/01 | SJK (C) Kong Hwa |
| Beseri（N02） | Tasoh | 001/02/02 | Kem Tasoh Pusat Ko-Kurikulum JPN Perlis |
| Beseri（N02） | Guar Jentil | 001/02/03 | SK Guar Jentik |
| Beseri（N02） | Beseri | 001/02/04 | SK Beseri |
| Beseri（N02） | Tunjong | 001/02/05 | SMK Tengku Sulaiman |

== Demographics ==
Ethnic breakdown of Beseri's electorate as of 2022
1. Malay (82.4%)
2. Chinese (15.1%)
3. Other ethnicities (1.82%)
4. Indian (0.75%)

Total electors by polling district in 2016
| Polling district | Electors |
|---|---|
| Pekan Kaki Bukit | 1,402 |
| Tasoh | 621 |
| Guar Jentik | 1,245 |
| Beseri | 2,166 |
| Tunjong | 2,955 |
| Total | 9,309 |
Source: Malaysian Election Commission

== History ==
Members of the Legislative Assembly for Beseri
| Assembly | No | Years | Member | Party |
Constituency created from Titi Tinggi, Chuping and Paya
| 7th | N02 | 1986–1990 | Nordin Abdullah | BN (UMNO) |
| 8th | N02 | 1990–1995 | Nordin Abdullah | BN (UMNO) |
| 9th | N02 | 1995–1999 | Nordin Abdullah | BN (UMNO) |
| 10th | N02 | 1999–2004 | Zahidi Zainul Abidin | BN (UMNO) |
| 11th | N02 | 2004–2008 | Zahidi Zainul Abidin | BN (UMNO) |
| 12th | N02 | 2008–2013 | Mat Rawi Kassim | BN (UMNO) |
| 13th | N02 | 2013–2018 | Mat Rawi Kassim | BN (UMNO) |
| 14th | N02 | 2018–2022 | Rouzaini Rais | BN (UMNO) |
| 15th | N02 | 2022–present | Haziq Asyraf Dun | PN (PAS) |

== Election results ==
Perlis state election, 2022
| Party | Candidate | Votes | % | ∆% |
|---|---|---|---|---|
| PN | Haziq Asyraf Dun | 4,040 | 45.84 | ▲45.84 |
| BN | Ruzaini Rais | 2,993 | 33.96 | ▼7.99 |
| PH | Mat Safar Saad | 1,684 | 19.11 | ▲19.11 |
| Heritage | Shamim Nordin | 96 | 1.09 | ▲1.09 |
| Total valid votes | | 8,813 | 100.00 | |
| Total rejected ballots | | 108 | | |
| Unreturned ballots | | 18 | | |
| Turnout | | 8,939 | 73.70 | ▼5.13 |
| Registered electors | | 12,128 | | |
| Majority | | 1,047 | | |
| PN gain from BN | | Swing | | ? |

Perlis state election, 2018
| Party | Candidate | Votes | % | ∆% |
|---|---|---|---|---|
| BN | Ruzaini Rais | 2,879 | 41.95 | ▼12.06 |
| PKR | Wan Kharizal Wan Khazim | 2,463 | 35.88 | ▲35.88 |
| PAS | Azamhari Mohamood | 1,523 | 22.18 | ▼23.81 |
| Total valid votes | | 6,865 | 100.00 | |
| Total rejected ballots | | 128 | | |
| Unreturned ballots | | 34 | | |
| Turnout | | 7,027 | 78.83 | ▼4.70 |
| Registered electors | | 8,914 | | |
| Majority | | 416 | | |
| BN hold | | Swing | | |

Perlis state election, 2013
| Party | Candidate | Votes | % | ∆% |
|---|---|---|---|---|
| BN | Mat Rawi Kassim | 3,636 | 54.01 | ▼6.81 |
| PAS | Wan Kharizal Wan Khazim | 3,096 | 45.99 | ▲45.99 |
| Total valid votes | | 6,732 | 100.00 | |
| Total rejected ballots | | 95 | | |
| Unreturned ballots | | 20 | | |
| Turnout | | 6,847 | 83.53 | ▲7.58 |
| Registered electors | | 8,197 | | |
| Majority | | 540 | | |
| BN hold | | Swing | | |
Source(s) "Federal Government Gazette - Notice of Contested Election, State Legislative Assembly for the State of Perlis [P.U. (B) 185/2013]" (PDF). Attorney General's Chambers of Malaysia. 26 April 2013. "Federal Government Gazette - Results of Contested Election and Statements of the Poll after the Official Addition of Votes, State Constituencies for the State of Perlis [P.U. (B) 226/2013]" (PDF). Attorney General's Chambers of Malaysia. 22 May 2013. "Federal Government Gazette - Results of Contested Election and Statements of the Poll after the Official Addition of Votes, State Constituencies for the State of Perlis Corrigendum [P.U. (B) 249/2013]" (PDF). Attorney General's Chambers of Malaysia. 31 May 2013.

Perlis state election, 2008
| Party | Candidate | Votes | % | ∆% |
|---|---|---|---|---|
| BN | Mat Rawi Kassim | 3,123 | 60.82 | ▼6.48 |
| PKR | Dzulkefli Mat De | 2,012 | 39.18 | ▲39.18 |
| Total valid votes | | 5,135 | 100.00 | |
| Total rejected ballots | | 130 | | |
| Unreturned ballots | | | | |
| Turnout | | 5,265 | 75.95 | ▼2.64 |
| Registered electors | | 6,932 | | |
| Majority | | 1,111 | | |
| BN hold | | Swing | | |

Perlis state election, 2004
| Party | Candidate | Votes | % | ∆% |
|---|---|---|---|---|
| BN | Zahidi Zainul Abidin | 3,492 | 68.30 | ▲9.64 |
| PAS | Mohd Anuar Mohd Tahir | 1,621 | 31.70 | ▼9.64 |
| Total valid votes | | 5,113 | 100.00 | |
| Total rejected ballots | | 109 | | |
| Unreturned ballots | | | | |
| Turnout | | 5,222 | 78.59 | ▲4.82 |
| Registered electors | | 6,645 | | |
| Majority | | 1,871 | | |
| BN hold | | Swing | | |

Perlis state election, 1999
| Party | Candidate | Votes | % | ∆% |
|---|---|---|---|---|
| BN | Zahidi Zainul Abidin | 2,774 | 58.66 | ▼15.71 |
| PAS | Abd. Rahman Rejab | 1,955 | 41.34 | ▲41.34 |
| Total valid votes | | 4,729 | 100.00 | |
| Total rejected ballots | | 110 | | |
| Unreturned ballots | | 230 | | |
| Turnout | | 5,069 | 73.77 | ▲2.93 |
| Registered electors | | 6,871 | | |
| Majority | | 819 | | |
| BN hold | | Swing | | |

Perlis state election, 1995
| Party | Candidate | Votes | % | ∆% |
|---|---|---|---|---|
| BN | Nordin Abdullah | 3,389 | 74.37 | ▲8.15 |
| S46 | Syed Ahmad Syed Ali | 1,168 | 25.63 | ▼8.15 |
| Total valid votes | | 4,557 | 100.00 | |
| Total rejected ballots | | 173 | | |
| Unreturned ballots | | 139 | | |
| Turnout | | 4,869 | 70.84 | ▼3.45 |
| Registered electors | | 6,873 | | |
| Majority | | 2,221 | | |
| BN hold | | Swing | | |

Perlis state election, 1990
| Party | Candidate | Votes | % | ∆% |
|---|---|---|---|---|
| BN | Nordin Abdullah | 3,286 | 66.22 | ▲1.34 |
| S46 | Abd. Rahman Rejab | 1,676 | 33.78 | ▲33.78 |
| Total valid votes | | 4,962 | 100.00 | |
| Total rejected ballots | | 176 | | |
| Unreturned ballots | | 0 | | |
| Turnout | | 5,138 | 74.29 | ▲1.63 |
| Registered electors | | 6,916 | | |
| Majority | | 1,610 | | |
| BN hold | | Swing | | |

Perlis state election, 1986
| Party | Candidate | Votes | % |
|---|---|---|---|
| BN | Nordin Abdullah | 2,784 | 64.88 |
| PAS | Yahaya Ahmad | 1,507 | 35.12 |
| Total valid votes | | 4,291 | 100.00 |
| Total rejected ballots | | 169 | |
| Unreturned ballots | | 0 | |
| Turnout | | 4,460 | 72.66 |
| Registered electors | | 6,138 | |
| Majority | | 1,277 | 29.76 |
This was a new constituency created.
