= 2024 Malaysian United Indigenous Party leadership election =

Election in a political party in Malaysia

- 2 November 2024
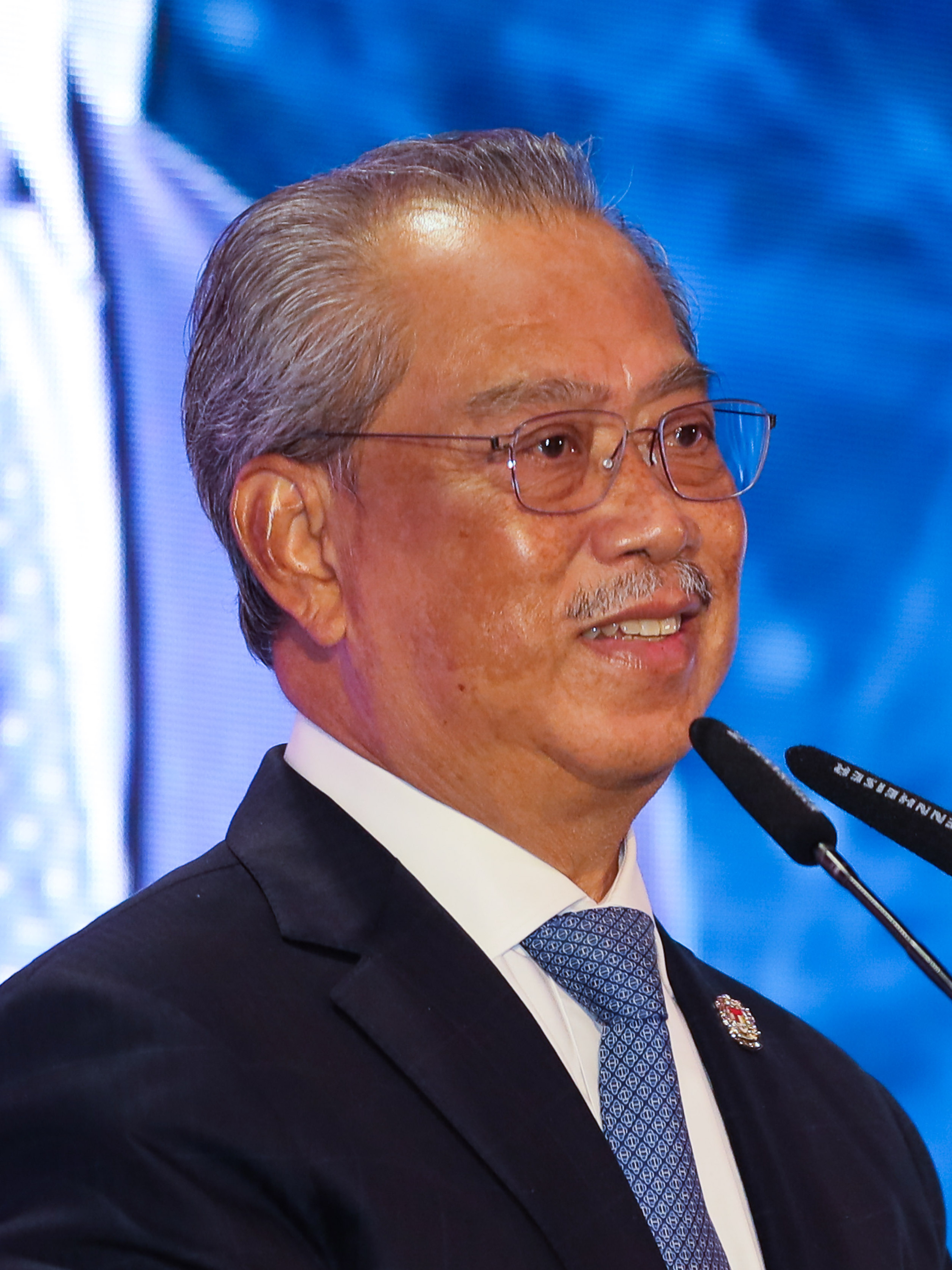
Candidate	Muhyiddin Yassin
Popular vote	Won uncontested
President of BERSATU before election
Muhyiddin Yassin
President of BERSATU after election
Muhyiddin Yassin

A leadership election will be held by the Malaysian United Indigenous Party (BERSATU) on 2 November 2024. This is the second BERSATU leadership election after the 2020 leadership election.

== Events ==
Incumbent President of BERSATU Muhyiddin Yassin confirmed on 25 November 2023 that he would defend his presidency after announcing he would not do so a day earlier. On 6 July 2024, it was confirmed that incumbent Deputy President Ahmad Faizal Azumu and Secretary-General Hamzah Zainudin would compete for the deputy presidency. For the three vice presidencies, incumbent Ronald Kiandee and Radzi Jidin would defend their positions while 10 others including incumbent Information Chief Razali Idris, Spokesperson Wan Saiful Wan Jan, State Chairman of Pahang Saifuddin Abdullah and Election Bureau Chairman Mohd Rafiq Mohd Abdullah have expressed their interest in contesting for the position.

However, on 13 July 2024, Muhyiddin proposed a new leadership lineup that has been endorsed and agreed by all members of the Supreme Council and the annual general meeting (AGM) accepting Hamzah Zainudin's promotion to deputy president and Ahmad Faizal Azumu's demotion to vice president. While the other two incumbent vice presidents, Ronald Kiandee and Mohd Radzi Md Jidin, retained their positions. Azmin Ali will appointed as secretary-general of the party.

== Election results ==
The following are the election results for the BERSATU Supreme Leadership Council for the 2024–2027 session.

=== Supreme Leadership Council ===
==== Permanent Chairman ====
Candidate	Division	Delegates' votes
Mohd Suhaimi Abdullah	Jerai	11,152
Khairulnoor Khairuddin	Ampang	Lost

==== Deputy Permanent Chairman ====
Candidate	Division	Delegates' votes
Mohd Hanafiah Hamzah	Tangga Batu	7,771
Mohd Farhan Aslam	Seremban	Lost
Juzaili Azmi	Padang Serai	Lost

==== President ====
Candidate	Division	Delegates' votes
Muhyiddin Yassin	Pagoh	Won uncontested

==== Deputy President ====
Candidate	Division	Delegates' votes
Hamzah Zainudin (Note: All members of the Supreme Leaders Council and the annual general meeting (AGM) agreed and confirmed accepting the promotion of Hamzah Zainudin as deputy president. This is one of the tactics and strategies of president Muhyiddin Yassin to reinforce the party's strength and avoid internal divisions within the party. However, all members in BERSATU are allowed to contest according to the party's constitution.)	Larut	Won uncontested

==== Vice Presidents ====
Candidate	Division	Delegates' votes
Ahmad Faizal Azumu (Note: All members of the Supreme Leaders Council and the annual general meeting (AGM) agreed and confirmed accepting the demotion of Ahmad Faizal Azumu as vice president. This is one of the tactics and strategies of president Muhyiddin Yassin to reinforce the party's strength and avoid internal divisions within the party. However, all members in BERSATU are allowed to contest according to the party's constitution.)	Tambun	9,280
Mohd Radzi Md Jidin	Putrajaya	11,660
Ronald Kiandee	Beluran	11,280
Aziss Zainal Abiddin	Batu Kawan	Lost
Razali Idris	Marang	Lost
Mohd Rafiq Mohd Abdullah	Sungai Buloh	Lost

==== Supreme Leader Council Members ====
Candidate	Division	Delegates' votes
Muhammad Yadzan Mohammad	Tanjong Malim	Won
Wan Saifulruddin Wan Jan	Bangi	Won
Wan Ahmad Fayhsal Wan Ahmad Kamal	Machang	Won
Sahruddin Jamal	Pagoh	Won
Zainol Fadzi Paharudin	Pasir Salak	Won
Rosol Wahid	Hulu Terengganu	Won
Abu Bakar Hamzah	Kangar	Won
Saifuddin Abdullah	Indera Mahkota	Won
Mohd Taufik Yaacob	Baling	Won
Zulkifli Bujang	Johor Bahru	Won
Mohd Yazid Mohd Yunus	Paya Besar	Won
Mohamad Hanifah Abu Baker	Rasah	Won
Muhamamd Affan Jumahat	Kudat	Won
Lim Ting Khai	Tawau	Won
Yunus Nurdin	Libaran	Won
Ikmal Hisham Abdul Aziz	Tanah Merah	Won
Mohd Yadzil Yaakub	Jasin	Won
Asmawi Harun	Bera	Won
Afif Bahardin	Shah Alam	Won
Mohamed Farid Mohamed Zawawi	Ketereh	Won
Rasman Ithnain	Kota Tinggi	Lost
Mohd Zohdi Saad	Padang Terap	Lost
Mohamad Rashidin Brawi	Kota Samarahan	Lost
Sharifah Salmah Syed Agil	Gombak	Lost
Ahmad Ishak	Gopeng	Lost
Mohd Shukor Mustaffa	Puchong	Lost
Mohd Husaimi Hussain	Besut	Lost
Najwah Halimah Ab Alim	Pulai	Lost
Mohd Ikhmal Abu Bakar	Setiawangsa	Lost
Mohamad Alharas Ibrahim	Setiawangsa	Lost
Ab Halim @ Kamaruddin Ab Kadir	Machang	Lost
Ahmad Nas Ruddin Abdullah	Pengkalan Chepa	Lost
Muhammad Rais Abu Hasan Ashaari	Damansara	Lost
Mohd Redzuan Md Yusof	Hulu Langat	Lost
Wan Dzahanurin Ahmad	Kota Raja	Lost
Mohd Fakrunizam Ibrahim	Raub	Lost
Asyraf Halim	Subang	Lost
Wan Zikri Afthar Ishak	Arau	Lost
Md Nayan Salleh	Parit Buntar	Lost
Ahmad Man	Bukit Gantang	Lost
Danni Rais	Jelebu	Lost
Zulkefli Bakar	Permatang Pauh	Lost
Azahari Aris	Bayan Baru	Lost
Rasman Farish Shamsuddin	Bukit Gelugor	Lost
Azmi Alang	Tasek Gelugor	Lost
Badrul Hisham Shaharin	Port Dickson	Lost
Mohd Ekbal Khalid	Kalabakan	Lost
Mahathir Mohd Rais	Segambut	Lost
Zulkifli Abdul Aziz	Taiping	Lost
Ahmad Ali Akbar Khan Gulam	Lahad Datu	Lost
Fathul Huzir Ayob	Gerik	Lost
Jasri Jamaludin	Maran	Lost
Muhammad Fadhli Ismail	Ipoh Timor	Lost
Mohammed Ridzal Mohd Kamal Ghazalee	Wangsa Maju	Lost
Mohd Rashid Hasnon	Parit Sulong	Lost
Mohd Nazri Abu Hassan	Merbok	Lost
Khairul Anuar Ramli	Padang Serai	Lost
Zulkifli Jaafar	Pulai	Lost
Muhamad Amri Wahab	Pokok Sena	Lost
Roslan Hashim	Kulim Bandar Baharu	Lost
Suhaimi Mohd Ghazali	Sepang	Lost
Hishamuddin Abdul Karim	Kota Melaka	Lost
Isa Ab Hamid	Pontian	Lost
Rosni Sham Samion	Masjid Tanah	Lost
Izizam Ibrahim	Padang Besar	Lost
Abdul Razak Khamis	Pendang	Lost
Aslam Nawabdin	Seremban	Lost
Safian Mohd Yunus	Seputeh	Lost
Mohd Aleef Yusof	Tangga Batu	Lost
Shamsilah Siru	Alor Setar	Lost
Faizah Baharom	Kuala Krau	Lost
Muhamamad Fadzil Mohamed	Shah Alam	Lost
Azman Nasrudin	Padang Serai	Lost
Noor Hafiz Mohd Nor	Putrajaya	Lost
Mohd Shahni Ismail	Bandar Tun Razak	Lost
Khaliq Mehtab Mohd Ishaq	Kepala Batas	Lost
Siti Nursuria Turano	Ampang	Lost
Noor Azman Ghazali	Bagan Serai	Lost
Alan M Raman	Titiawangsa	Lost

==== Women's Chief ====
Candidate	Division	Delegates' votes
Mas Ermieyati Samsudin	Masjid Tanah	Won uncontested
~~Rina Harun~~	Sepang	Withdraw

==== Deputy Women's Chief ====
Candidate	Division	Delegates' votes
Nolee Ashilin Mohammed Radzi	Kampar	Won uncontested

==== Youth's Chief ====
Candidate	Division	Delegates' votes
Muhammad Hilman Idham	Gombak	1,888
Akmal Zahin Zainal Abidin	Seputeh	1,718

==== Youth's Vice Chief ====
Candidate	Division	Delegates' votes
Faiz Rahmad	Unknown	1,790
Izhar Shah Arif Shah	Permatang Pauh	1,287
Adib Shaharuddin	Unknown	490

==== Women Youth's Chief ====
Candidate	Division	Delegates' votes
Nurul Ezzati Azmi	Kampar	Won
Hefvihervina Rohayu Hariyanto	Ayer Hitam	Unknown
Nurul Fadzilah Kamaluddin	Gombak	Unknown

==== Associate Chief ====
Candidate	Division	Delegates' votes
Chong Fat Full	Ledang	Won uncontested
~~Vanshantha Kumar Krishnan~~	Bangi	Unknown (Note: Maybe the candidate withdraw their candidacy early.)

==== Associate Vice Chief ====
Candidate	Division	Delegates' votes
Sanjeevan Ramakrishnan	Jempol	Won uncontested
~~Cheah Kim Huat~~	Tanjong	Unknown (Note: Maybe the candidate withdraw their candidacy early.)
