= 2020 Malaysian United Indigenous Party leadership election =

Election in a political party in Malaysia

22 August 2020	2024 →
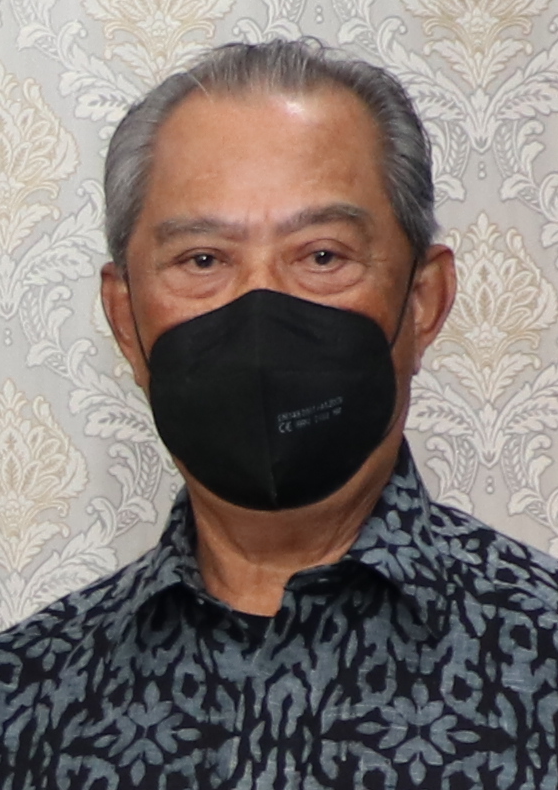
Candidate	Muhyiddin Yassin
Popular vote	Won uncontested
President of BERSATU before election
Muhyiddin Yassin
President of BERSATU
Muhyiddin Yassin

A leadership election was held by the Malaysian United Indigenous Party (BERSATU) on 22 August 2020. It was won by incumbent president of BERSATU, Muhyiddin Yassin.

== Election results ==
The following are the election results for the BERSATU Supreme Leadership Council for the 2019–2022 session.

=== Supreme Leadership Council ===
==== Permanent Chairman ====
Candidate	Delegates' votes
Mohd Suhaimi Abdullah	

==== Deputy Permanent Chairman ====
Candidate	Delegates' votes
Hashim Suboh	

==== President ====
Candidate	Delegates' votes
Muhyiddin Yassin	Won uncontested

==== Deputy President ====
Candidate	Delegates' votes
Ahmad Faizal Azumu	Won uncontested

==== Vice Presidents ====
Candidate	Delegates' votes
Ronald Kiandee	19,594
Mohd Radzi Md Jidin	
Mohd Rafiq Naizamohideen	
Mohd Redzuan Md Yusof	

==== Central Working Committee Members ====
Candidate	Delegates' votes
Ikmal Hisham Abdul Aziz	
Abdul Hakim Gulam Hassan	
Zainol Fadzi Paharudin	
Iskandar Dzulkarnain Abdul Khalid	
Razali Idris	
Eddin Syazlee Shith	
Mustapa Mohamed	
Wan Saifulruddin Wan Jan	
Azlinda Abdul Latif	
Mohd Taufik Yaacob	
Mohd Rafiq Mohd Abdullah	
Lajim Ukin	
Suhaili Abdul Rahman	
Sahruddin Jamal	
Mohamed Farid Mohamed Zawawi	
Mohd Zulkifli Zakaria	
Mohd Yazid Mohd Yunus	
Shabudin Yahaya	
Rosol Wahid	
Shamsilah Siru	
