= Malaysian United Indigenous Party =

Malaysian political party

- Malay name: Parti Pribumi Bersatu Malaysia
- Abbreviation: BERSATU / PPBM
- President: Muhyiddin Yassin
- Chairperson: Mohd Suhaimi Abdullah
- Secretary-General: Mohamed Azmin Ali
- Spokesperson: Tun Faisal Ismail Aziz
- Acting Deputy Presidents: Radzi Jidin; Ahmad Faizal Azumu
- Vice Presidents: Radzi Jidin; Ahmad Faizal Azumu
- Youth Chief: Muhammad Hilman Idham
- Women's Chief: Nolee Ashilin Mohammed Radzi
- Founders: Muhyiddin Yassin; Mahathir Mohamad
- Founded: 7 September 2016
- Registered: 14 January 2017
- Legalised: 14 January 2017
- Split from: United Malays National Organisation (UMNO); People's Justice Party (PKR) (Azmin Ali faction; 2020)
- Preceded by: Persatuan Pribumi Bersatu Malaysia (United Indigenous Association of Malaysia)
- Headquarters: Tingkat 8, Menara Yayasan Selangor, No 18A Jalan Persiaran Barat PJS 52 46200 Petaling Jaya
- Think tank: Institut Masa Depan Malaysia
- Youth wing: Armada BERSATU
- Women's wing: Srikandi BERSATU
- Women's youth wing: Srikandi Muda BERSATU
- Membership (2024): 700,000 (2024)
- Ideology: Ketuanan Melayu; Social conservatism; Islamism (faction); Until 2020: Islamic democracy; Liberal conservatism
- Political position: Right-wing; Until 2020: Centre-right
- National affiliation: Perikatan Nasional (since 2020) (Note: The party was formerly part of the Pakatan Harapan (2017–2020), Warisan Plus (2019–2020), and Gabungan Rakyat Sabah (2020–2022). Through PN it was aligned with Barisan Nasional (2020–2022) and Gabungan Parti Sarawak (2020–2022)); Ikatan Prihatin Rakyat (since 2025)
- Colours: Red and white
- Slogan: Bersatu, Beramanah, Bermaruah (United, Trustworthy, Dignified)
- Anthem: Perjuangan Kita
- Dewan Negara: 0 / 70
- Dewan Rakyat: 19 / 222
- State Legislative Assemblies: 49 / 612
- Chief ministers of states: 1 / 13

Election symbol
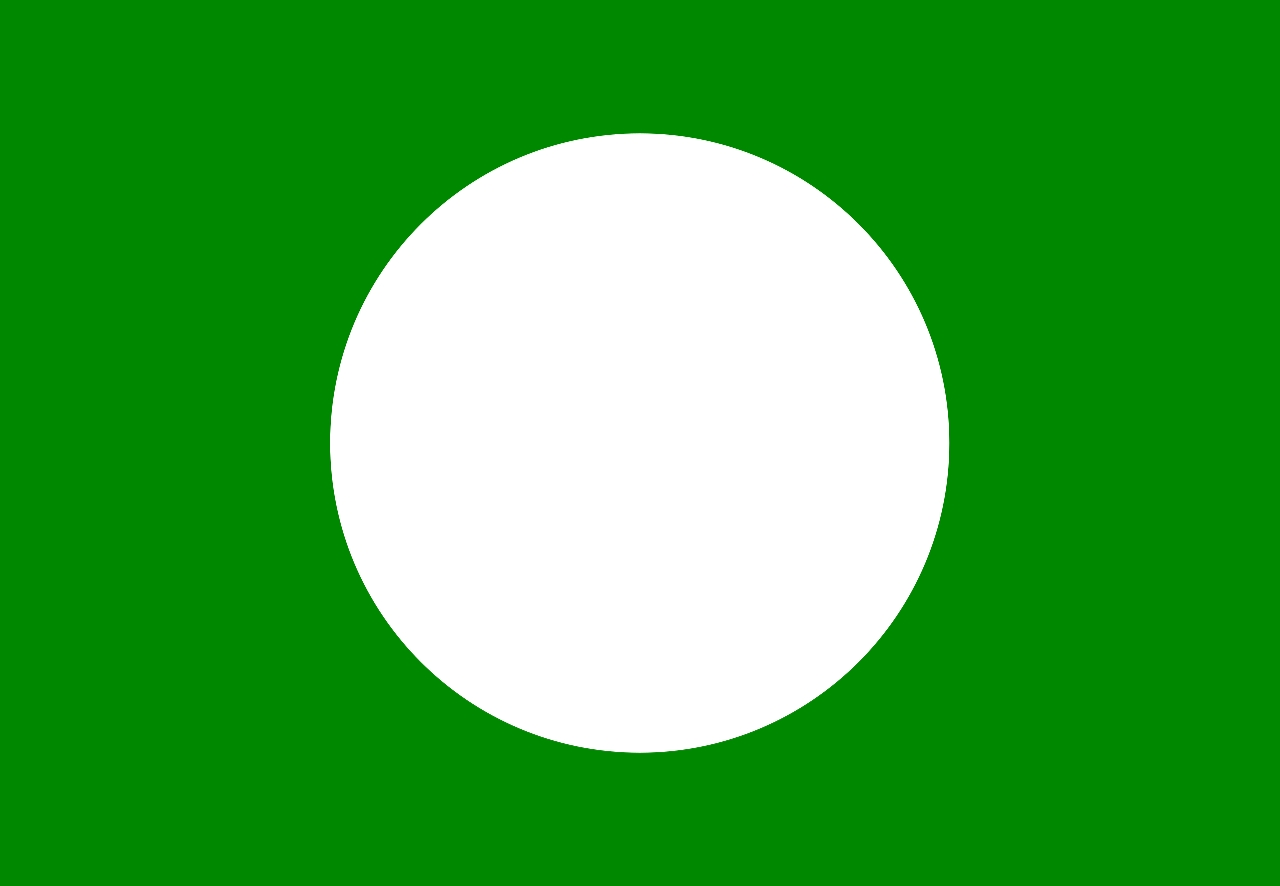
- (except in Malacca, Negeri Sembilan, Kelantan and Terengganu) (only in Malacca and Negeri Sembilan) (only in Kelantan and Terengganu)

Party flag

Website
- mybersatu.org

The Malaysian United Indigenous Party (Malay: Parti Pribumi Bersatu Malaysia; abbrev: BERSATU or PPBM) is a nationalist political party in Malaysia. The party was preceded by the United Indigenous Association of Malaysia (Malay: Persatuan Pribumi Bersatu Malaysia) and founded by members of the United Malays National Organisation (UMNO) rebel group Gabungan Ketua Cawangan Malaysia. It is a major component of the Perikatan Nasional coalition.

Full membership in the party is limited only for Bumiputeras (indigenous communities of Malaysia). Non-Bumiputeras are permitted to join the party as associate members who are not eligible to vote and contest party elections.

== History ==
=== Formation ===
On 10 August 2016, former UMNO deputy president Muhyiddin Yassin submitted an application for the party's registration with himself as president, Mukhriz Mahathir as deputy president, and Mahathir Mohamad as chairman. BERSATU's formation was undertaken by former members of UMNO in opposition to the then-prime minister Najib Razak.

On 12 November 2016, Mahathir announced that the party would join the Pakatan Harapan opposition coalition, which then consisted of Parti Keadilan Rakyat, the Democratic Action Party, and Parti Amanah Negara, pending the decision of the Malaysian Islamic Party, another opposition party. He expressed the need for a united opposition in order to defeat the incumbent Barisan Nasional government. It officially joined the coalition on 13 December.

=== Forming a Pakatan Harapan government ===
The 2018 general election saw the Pakatan Harapan coalition and its allies win 121 seats in the country's lower house of parliament, enough to form a majority government. BERSATU itself won 13 seats and garnered 5.9% of the vote. As the coalition's prime ministerial candidate, Mahathir was sworn in as Malaysia's seventh prime minister at 93 years of age, becoming the world's oldest elected head of government. Mahathir had previously held the position of prime minister from 1981 to 2003, during he led the Barisan Nasional coalition as leader of the United Malays National Organisation.

In the aftermath of the election which ended Barisan Nasional's 60-year-long rule over the country, members of parliament, state assemblymen, and senators defected from UMNO to BERSATU. They included high-ranking UMNO politicians such as Mustapa Mohamed and Hamzah Zainudin, with the latter claiming 36 Barisan Nasional members of parliament had signed a pledge supporting Mahathir. The party also benefitted from an exodus of members from UMNO's Sabah chapter, from which it gained In total, the party gained an additional 12 members of parliament and two senators from May 2018 to February 2019.

=== Collapse of Pakatan and formation of Perikatan Nasional ===
The government of Pakatan Harapan collapsed in February 2020 when Mahathir tendered his resignation as prime minister and the party announced its withdrawal from the coalition. This occurred against a backdrop of increasing tension within the coalition and speculation that Mahathir intended to form a new coalition that would exclude his designated successor, Anwar Ibrahim. With the loss of 26 members of parliament from BERSATU as well as an additional eleven members from Anwar's Parti Keadilan Rakyat, the coalition lost its majority in parliament. The eleven rebel members of parliament, led by Mohamed Azmin Ali, later joined the party.

Mahathir had also resigned as party chairman, a decision which the party's supreme council rejected unanimously in an emergency meeting. Pakatan Harapan member parties also announced their support for Mahathir to remain as prime minister despite his resignation.

The formation of a new coalition government began when BERSATU announced that they would nominate party president Muhyiddin Yassin as prime minister, although a supreme council member claimed he had neither been invited to discuss or informed about the decision. This was followed by declarations of support from the United Malay National Organisation, the Malaysian Islamic Party, Malaysian Chinese Association, and Malaysian Indian Congress. The nomination faced pushback from youth leader Syed Saddiq, who objected to working with UMNO, suggesting a split within the party over Muhyiddin's candidacy. This was further reinforced when Mahathir announced that he had the necessary support from Pakatan Harapan to return as prime minister and denied having supported Muhyiddin's bid for the position.

Muhyiddin was sworn in as the country's eight prime minister on 1 March, leading the newly founded Perikatan Nasional coalition consisting of the United Malay National Organisation, Malaysian Islamic Party, Gabungan Parti Sarawak, Parti Bersatu Rakyat Sabah, Homeland Solidarity Party, and BERSATU into government.

In May, Mahathir Mohamad, Mukhriz Mahathir, Syed Saddiq, Maszlee Malik and Amiruddin Hamzah were expelled from the party after opting to sit with the opposition in parliament, citing a provision in the party's constitution that automatically revoked the membership of individuals who joined other parties. Mahathir had initially sought to table a motion of no confidence against Muhyiddin during a one-day meeting of parliament, the first since the formation of the new government, but was prevented from doing so after Muhyiddin ordered the speaker to end proceedings immediately after the king's speech.

In June, the party another lost a member of parliament when Shahruddin Md Salleh resigned from his position as Deputy Minister of Works and joined the opposition, referring to his decision to join the government as a "mistake". However, independent member of parliament Syed Abu Hussin Hafiz, a former member of UMNO, would join the party a few days later.

The party was embroiled in a scandal when it was revealed in June and July 2021 that two separate events involving party members had occurred sometime during the COVID-19 pandemic in Malaysia, with participants reportedly contravening the Malaysian movement control order, a lockdown imposed by the Malaysian government in response to the pandemic.

=== Loss of majority in parliament ===
Tension within the Perikatan Nasional coalition government resulted in Muhyiddin's resignation as prime minister in August 2021. United Malay National Organisation president Ahmad Zahid Hamidi announced that the party would be withdrawing its support for the government in July 2021, but faced opposition from Ismail Sabri, the then-deputy prime minister, who led a faction within the party that continued to support Muhyiddin. The split led to uncertainty as to whether Muhyiddin's government continued to possess a majority in parliament, with Muhyiddin ultimately resigning on 16 August. He was succeeded by Ismail Sabri on 21 August, with BERSATU members being appointed in his cabinet.

=== Return to opposition ===
The 2022 Malaysian general election saw the party make big gains, particularly in former UMNO strongholds. However, the election resulted in hung parliament. Following Barisan Nasional's decision to form a government with Pakatan Harapan, and Muhyiddin's rejection of a unity government, BERSATU entered into opposition. The party continued to make gains in the 2023 Malaysian state elections, falling just short of a majority in the state of Selangor which it targeted.

However, the post-election period saw massive upheaval due to an intraparty struggle between the factions aligned with Muhyiddin on one side and Hamzah Zainuddin on the other. The dispute led to waves of expulsions and suspensions, including the expulsion of six MPs, Hamzah among them, who went on to found the National Vision Party (WAWASAN) in 2026. An additional eight MPs had their memberships suspended the same year.

The party also lost heavily in four consecutive by-elections in 2024; Pulai, Kuala Kubu Baharu, Nenggiri and Mahkota, casting doubt on the party's long-term viability. It was also wiped out in the 2025 Sabah state election, as well as in the 2026 Johor and 2026 Negeri Sembilan state elections.

The party's continued participation within the Perikatan Nasional coalition was cast in doubt following a dispute with the Malaysian Islamic Party (PAS), which resulted in Muhyiddin's public declaration that he intended to form a new coalition involving parties from Ikatan Prihatin Rakyat (IPR), including Parti Bumiputera Perkasa Malaysia (PUTRA) and the United for the Rights of Malaysians Party (URIMAI) in the lead up to the 2026 Negeri Sembilan state election.

In October 2026, BERSATU MPs signed a confidence and supply agreement (CSA) with the Anwar Ibrahim government.

== Identity ==
BERSATU was formed by former members of UMNO following fallout from the 1MDB scandal, and was set up as a competitor to UMNO appealing to Malay voters. However, the Malay vote remained mostly split between UMNO and the Malaysian Islamic Party (PAS), with BERSATU unable to establish a clear identity.

== Organisational structure ==
=== Supreme Leadership Council (2024–2027) ===
- Permanent Chairperson:
  - Mohd Suhaimi Abdullah
- Deputy Permanent Chairperson:
  - Mohd Hanafiah Hamzah
- President:
  - Muhyiddin Yassin
- Acting Deputy Presidents:
  - Radzi Jidin
  - Ahmad Faizal Azumu
- Vice Presidents:
  - Radzi Jidin
  - ~~Ronald Kiandee~~
  - Ahmad Faizal Azumu
- Acting Srikandi Chief (Vice President):
  - Nolee Ashilin Mohammed Radzi
- ARMADA Chief (Vice President):
  - Muhammad Hilman Idham
- Srikandi Muda Chief (Vice President):
  - Nurul Ezzati Azmi
- Acting Associate Chief:
  - Sri Sanjeevan Ramakrishnan
- Secretary-General:
  - Mohamed Azmin Ali
- Treasurer-General:
  - Rina Harun
- Information Chief:
  - Tun Faisal Ismail Aziz
- Election Director:
  - Mohamed Azmin Ali
- Disciplinary Board Chairman:
  - Mohammed Radzi Manan
- Appeal Board Chairman:
  - Azhar Azizan Harun
- Supreme Leadership Council Members (elected):
  - ~~Ikmal Hisham Abdul Aziz~~
  - ~~Abu Bakar Hamzah~~
  - ~~Mohd Taufik Yaacob~~
  - Sahruddin Jamal
  - Mohd Yazid Mohd Yunus
  - Mohamad Hanifah Abu Baker
  - ~~Rosol Wahid~~
  - Afif Bahardin
  - Muhammad Yadzan Mohammad
- Supreme Leadership Council Members (appointed):
  - Harrison Hassan
  - ~~Danni Rais Yatim~~
  - Jaziri Alkaf Abdillah Suffian
- State Chairman:
  - Johor: Sahruddin Jamal
  - Kedah: Mohd Suhaimi Abdullah
  - Kelantan: Kamarudin Md Nor
  - Negeri Sembilan: Mohamad Hanifah Abu Baker
  - Pahang: Mohd Yazid Mohd Yunus
  - Perak: Ahmad Faizal Azumu
  - Perlis: Izizam Ibrahim
  - Penang: Zulkefli Bakar
  - Sarawak: Jaziri Alkaf Abdillah Suffian
  - Sabah: Vacant
  - Selangor: Mohamed Azmin Ali
  - Terengganu: Mohd Yusop Majid
  - Malacca & Federal Territories: Radzi Jidin
- Deputy State Chairman:
  - Johor: Mohd Rashid Hasnon
  - Kedah: Mohd Salleh Saidin
  - Kelantan: Vacant
  - Malacca: Mohamad Ali Mohamad
  - Negeri Sembilan: Vacant
  - Pahang: Jasri Jamaluddin
  - Perak: Mohader Ahmad Mohd Ayob
  - Perlis: Vacant
  - Penang: Azmi Alang
  - Sarawak: Vacant
  - Sabah: Vacant
  - Selangor: Mohd Rafiq Mohd Abdullah
  - Terengganu: Vacant
  - Federal Territories: Mohd Badrul Ezan Mohd Yusof

=== Youth Wing (ARMADA) ===
- Youth Wing Chairman:
  - Muhamad Amerul Muhamad
- Deputy Youth Wing Chairman:
  - Mohd Firdaus Mohd Zaini
- Youth Chief:
  - Muhammad Hilman Idham
- Vice Youth Chief:
  - Muhammad Faiz Rahmad
- Youth Chief Secretary-General:
  - Mohd Fahim Mohd Farid
- Youth Chief Treasurer-General:
  - Nor Zahid Rahim
- Youth Chief Information Chief:
  - Muhammad Harris Idaham Abdul Rashid
- FELDA Bureau Chairman:
  - Azizan Abdul Aziz
- Legal Advice and Law Bureau Chairman:
  - Zolazrai Zolkapli
- Sports & Pop Culture Bureau Chairman:
  - Muhammad Syamel Md Riduan
- Central ARMADA Leadership Council Members (elected):
  - Abdul Halim Md Nayan
  - ~~Aziman Hadi Nazri~~
  - Wan Meor Safwat Naqiuddin Shamsudin
  - Aendrie Azwan Abdul Aziz
  - Muhammad Harris Idaham Abdul Rashid
  - Muhammad Airil Fitri Jalalluddin
  - Mohd Idzharruddin Mohd Nasirruddin
  - Che Wan Farid Che Wan Abd Rahman
  - Muhammad Najmie Amir
  - Muhammad Khairi Zainol Abidin
  - Mohamad Aris Abu Kasim
  - Ridzuan Agus Payong
  - Afrizan Jamil
  - Abdul Asis Rishad Khan
  - Muhammad Ashraf Hayup Khan
- Central ARMADA Leadership Council Members (appointed):
  - Naim Brundage
  - Ab Adib Shaharuddin
  - PU Raihan Husni
  - Muhamamd Afiq Hassan
  - Mohammad Shakir Ariff Shaifuddin
  - Amar Pared Mahamud
  - Izhar Shah Arif Shah
  - Syed Lukman Hakim Syed Mohd Zin

=== Women Wing (SRIKANDI) ===
- Women Wing Chairperson:
  - Neng Hayati Hayatullah Md Ali
- Deputy Women Wing Chairperson:
  - Siti Farah Binti Abu Hassan
- Women Chief:
  - Nolee Ashilin Mohammed Radzi (acting)
- Vice Women Chief:
  - Nolee Ashilin Mohammed Radzi
- Women Youth Chief:
  - Nurul Ezzati Azmi
- Deputy Women Youth Chief:
  - Vacant
- Central SRIKANDI Leadership Council Members (elected):
  - ~~Marzita Mansor~~
  - Rapia'ah Ngah
  - Nurulhuda Md Yunus
  - ~~Dayang Saniah Awang Hamid~~
  - Noor Jeehan Adam
  - Noor'azah Harun
  - Rahimah Majid
  - Rohana Ghazali
  - Hafizah Md Taib
  - Juliana Abdul Ghani
  - Zarina Abdullah
  - Jawahir Husein
  - Nor Izzatun Udda Mohamed
  - Borkes @ Balkis Kalinggalan
  - Puteri Holijah Muhamad Rali

=== Associate Wing (BERSEKUTU) ===
- Associate Wing Chairman:
  - Chelvarajan R Suppiah
- Deputy Associate Wing Chairman:
  - Subramaniam Purushothama
- Associate Chief:
  - Sri Sanjeevan Ramakrishnan (acting)
- Deputy Associate Chief:
  - Sri Sanjeevan Ramakrishnan
- Central BERSEKUTU Leadership Council Members (elected):
  - Sivasubramaniam Athinarayanan
  - ~~Erik Michael~~
  - Kumar Silambaram
  - Rejean Kumar Ratnam
  - Richard Ng
  - Khoo Kong Ek
  - Simon Loi Teck Ong
  - Chew Han Keai
  - Meshach Jedidiah Varunamegam
  - Simon Suresh V Varunamegam
  - Tan Sung Siong
  - Robert Ling Kui Ee
  - Goh Gaik Meng
  - Kok Boon Chang

== Leadership ==
=== Chairman ===
Order	Name	Term of office		Remarks	Mandates
1	Mahathir Mohamad	7 September 2016	24 February 2020		–
–	Muhyiddin Yassin	24 February 2020	23 August 2020	Acting	1st (2020)
Position abolished

=== President ===
Order	Name	Term of office		Mandates
1	Muhyiddin Yassin	7 September 2016	Incumbent	1st (2020); 2nd (2024)

=== Deputy President ===
Order	Name	Term of office		Mandates
1	Mukhriz Mahathir	7 September 2016	28 May 2020	–
2	Ahmad Faizal Azumu	23 August 2020	29 November 2024	1st (2020)
3	Hamzah Zainudin	29 November 2024	13 February 2026	2nd (2024)

=== Youth Chief ===
Order	Name	Term of office		Mandates
1	Syed Saddiq	7 September 2016	28 May 2020	–
2	Wan Ahmad Fayhsal	23 August 2020	29 November 2024	1st (2020)
3	Hilman Idham	29 November 2024	Incumbent	2nd (2024)

== Elected representatives ==
=== Dewan Rakyat (House of Representatives) ===
==== Members of Parliament of the 15th Malaysian Parliament ====
BERSATU has 19 members in the House of Representatives. The names of eight MPs whose membership in the party have been suspended are struck through.

State	No.	Parliament Constituency	Member
Perlis	P002	Kangar	Zakri Hassan
Kedah	P004	Langkawi	Mohd Suhaimi Abdullah
Kedah	P006	Kubang Pasu	Ku Abdul Rahman Ku Ismail
Kedah	P014	Merbok	Mohd Nazri Abu Hassan
Kedah	P017	Padang Serai	Azman Nasrudin
Kedah	P018	Kulim-Bandar Baharu	Roslan Hashim
Kelantan	P026	Ketereh	~~Khlir Mohd Nor~~
Kelantan	P027	Tanah Merah	~~Ikmal Hisham Abdul Aziz~~
Terengganu	P038	Hulu Terengganu	~~Rosol Wahid~~
Perak	P074	Lumut	~~Nordin Ahmad Ismail~~
Pahang	P091	Rompin	~~Abdul Khalib Abdullah~~
Selangor	P092	Sabak Bernam	Kalam Salan
Selangor	P093	Sungai Besar	Muslimin Yahaya
Putrajaya	P125	Putrajaya	Radzi Jidin
Malacca	P134	Masjid Tanah	~~Mas Ermieyati Samsudin~~
Johor	P143	Pagoh	Muhyiddin Yassin
Johor	P154	Mersing	~~Muhammad Islahuddin Abas~~
Sabah	P183	Beluran	~~Ronald Kiandee~~
Sarawak	P205	Saratok	Ali Biju
Total	Perlis (1), Kedah (5), Kelantan (2), Terengganu (1), Perak (1), Pahang (1), Selangor (2), F.T. Putrajaya (1), Malacca (1), Johor (2), Sabah (1), Sarawak (1)		

=== Dewan Undangan Negeri (State Legislative Assembly) ===
==== Malaysian State Assembly Representatives ====
Perlis State Legislative Assembly

5 / 15

Kedah State Legislative Assembly

9 / 36

Selangor State Legislative Assembly

11 / 56

Terengganu State Legislative Assembly

5 / 33

Perak State Legislative Assembly

8 / 59

Kelantan State Legislative Assembly

4 / 45

Penang State Legislative Assembly

4 / 40

Malacca State Legislative Assembly

0 / 28

Pahang State Legislative Assembly

2 / 47

Negeri Sembilan State Legislative Assembly

0 / 36

Johor State Legislative Assembly

0 / 56

Sabah State Legislative Assembly

0 / 79

Sarawak State Legislative Assembly

0 / 82

State	No.	Parliamentary Constituency	No.	State Assembly Constituency	Member	Notes
Perlis	P001	Padang Besar	N01	Titi Tinggi	Izizam Ibrahim	State EXCO
Perlis	P002	Kangar	N07	Sena	Marzita Mansor	State EXCO
Perlis	P002	Kangar	N09	Kuala Perlis	Abu Bakar Hamzah	Menteri Besar
Perlis	P003	Arau	N11	Pauh	Megat Hashirat Hassan	State EXCO
Perlis	P003	Arau	N12	Tambun Tulang	Wan Zikri Afthar Ishak	State EXCO
Kedah	P004	Langkawi	N01	Ayer Hangat	Shamsilah Siru	
Kedah	P004	Langkawi	N02	Kuah	Ahmad Pared Mahamud	
Kedah	P005	Jerlun	N03	Kota Siputeh	Mohd Ashraf Mustaqim Badrul Munir	
Kedah	P006	Kubang Pasu	N05	Bukit Kayu Hitam	Halimaton Shaadiah Saad	State EXCO
Kedah	P008	Pokok Sena	N11	Derga	~~Muhamad Amri Wahab~~	
Kedah	P010	Kuala Kedah	N16	Kubang Rotan	Mohd Salleh Saidin	State EXCO
Kedah	P012	Jerai	N21	Guar Chempedak	Abdul Ghafar Saad	
Kedah	P016	Baling	N30	Bayu	Mohd Taufik Yaacob	
Kedah	P017	Padang Serai	N34	Lunas	Khairul Anuar Ramli	
Kelantan	P027	Tanah Merah	N27	Gual Ipoh	Bahari Mohamad Nor	Deputy State EXCO
Kelantan	P030	Jeli	N36	Bukit Bunga	~~Mohd Almidi Jaafar~~	
Kelantan	P030	Jeli	N37	Air Lanas	Kamarudin Md Nor	
Kelantan	P032	Gua Musang	N44	Paloh	Shaari Mat Hussain	Deputy State EXCO
Terengganu	P033	Besut	N04	Hulu Besut	Mohd Husaimi Hussin	Deputy State EXCO
Terengganu	P034	Setiu	N06	Permaisuri	Mohd Yusop Majid	Deputy State EXCO
Terengganu	P035	Kuala Nerus	N11	Seberang Takir	Khazan Che Mat	Deputy Speaker
Terengganu	P038	Hulu Terengganu	N21	Telemung	Mohd Zawawi Ismail	Deputy State EXCO
Terengganu	P040	Kemaman	N30	Kijal	Razali Idris	State EXCO
Penang	P042	Tasek Gelugor	N06	Telok Ayer Tawar	Azmi Alang	
Penang	P044	Permatang Pauh	N10	Seberang Jaya	Izhar Shah Arif Shah	
Penang	P044	Permatang Pauh	N12	Penanti	Zulkefli Bakar	
Penang	P053	Balik Pulau	N40	Telok Bahang	Muhamad Kasim	
Perak	P056	Larut	N07	Batu Kurau	Mohd Najmuddin Elias Al-Hafiz	
Perak	P057	Parit Buntar	N9	Kuala Kurau	Abdul Yunus Jamahri	
Perak	P058	Bagan Serai	N10	Alor Pongsu	Noor Azman Ghazali	
Perak	P059	Bukit Gantang	N13	Kuala Sepetang	~~Ahmad Man~~	
Perak	P061	Padang Rengas	N19	Chenderoh	~~Syed Lukman Hakim Syed Mohd Zin~~	
Perak	P067	Kuala Kangsar	N34	Bukit Chandan	Hashim Bujang	
Perak	P074	Lumut	N52	Pangkor	Norhaslinda Zakaria	
Perak	P076	Teluk Intan	N56	Changkat Jong	Nadziruddin Mohamed Bandi	
Pahang	P084	Paya Besar	N18	Lepar	Mohd Yazid Mohd Yunus	
Pahang	P086	Maran	N25	Kuala Sentul	Jasri Jamaluddin	
Selangor	P094	Hulu Selangor	N07	Batang Kali	Muhammad Muhaimin Harith Abdullah Sani	
Selangor	P095	Tanjong Karang	N09	Permatang	Nurul Syazwani Noh	
Selangor	P096	Kuala Selangor	N10	Bukit Melawati	Noorazley Yahya	
Selangor	P096	Kuala Selangor	N12	Jeram	Harrison Hassan	
Selangor	P097	Selayang	N13	Kuang	Mohd Rafiq Mohd Abdullah	
Selangor	P098	Gombak	N17	Gombak Setia	Muhammad Hilman Idham	
Selangor	P098	Gombak	N18	Hulu Kelang	Mohamed Azmin Ali	Opposition Leader
Selangor	P105	Petaling Jaya	N33	Taman Medan	Afif Bahardin	
Selangor	P111	Kota Raja	N49	Sungai Kandis	Wan Dzahanurin Ahmad	
Selangor	P112	Kuala Langat	N53	Morib	Rosnizan Ahmad	
Selangor	P113	Sepang	N55	Dengkil	Jamil Salleh	
Total	Perlis (5), Kedah (9), Kelantan (4), Terengganu (5), Penang (4), Perak (8), Pahang (2), Selangor (11)					

- BERSATU remains 44 members across all state legislative assembly despite some of them being sacked

== Government offices ==
=== State governments ===
BERSATU currently lead the state of Perlis and worked as coalition partner with PAS in Kelantan, Terengganu and Kedah state governments. In the past, it led Perak, Johor and Kedah under Pakatan Harapan as well as Perak and Sabah under Perikatan Nasional

- Perlis (2022–2025, 2025–present)
- Kelantan (2020–present)
- Terengganu (2020–present)
- Kedah (2018–2020, 2020–present)
- Pahang (2026–present)
- Sabah (2019–2020, 2020–2022)
- Perak (2018–2020, 2020–2022)
- Johor (2018–2020, 2020–2022)
- Sarawak (2020–2021)
- Malacca (2018–2021)
- Penang (2018–2020)
- Selangor (2018–2020)

Note: bold for coalition lead, italic as junior partner

State	Leader type	Member	State Constituency
Perlis	Menteri Besar	Abu Bakar Hamzah	Kuala Perlis

=== Legislative leadership ===
State	Leader type	Member	State Constituency
Terengganu	Deputy Speaker	Khazan Che Mat	Seberang Takir

=== Official opposition ===
State	Leader type	Member	State Constituency
Selangor	Opposition Leader	Azmin Ali	Hulu Kelang

== Election results ==
=== General election results ===
Election	Total seats won	Seats contested	Total votes	Voting Percentage	Outcome of election	Election leader
2018	13 / 222	52	718,648	5.95%	▲13 seats; Governing coalition (Pakatan Harapan, later Perikatan Nasional)	Mahathir Mohamad
2022	35 / 222	87 (under PN) (Peninsular, Sarawak, and Beluran); 6 (under GRS) (Sabah except Beluran)	2,196,236	14.16%	▲21 seats; Opposition coalition (Perikatan Nasional) (2022–2026 (Muhyiddin-aligned faction), since 2026 (Hamzah-aligned faction)); Confidence and supply (since 2026, Muhyiddin-aligned faction)	Muhyiddin Yassin

=== State election results ===
State assembly	Election	Votes	%	Seats	Won/contested	+/–	Position (Note: As part of electoral coalition.)	Status
Perlis	2022	27,701	18.7	5 / 15	5 / 6	▲5	▲1st (Perikatan Nasional)	PN (Note: BERSATU–PN (since 2026))
Kedah	2023	245,725	21.1	11 / 36	11 / 12	▲6	1st (Perikatan Nasional)	PN
Kelantan	2023	57,797	6.8	6 / 45	6 / 6	▲6	▲1st (Perikatan Nasional)	PN
Terengganu	2023	58,301	8.4	5 / 32	5 / 5	▲5	▲1st (Perikatan Nasional)	PN
Penang	2023	96,003	10.8	4 / 40	4 / 11	▲2	▼2nd (Perikatan Nasional)	Opposition
Perak	2022	207,347	14.0	10 / 59	10 / 27	▲9	1st (Perikatan Nasional)	Opposition
Pahang	2022	77,196	8.9	2 / 42	2 / 13	▲2	▲1st (Perikatan Nasional)	Opposition (2022–2026)
Pahang	2022	77,196	8.9	2 / 42	2 / 13	▲2	▲1st (Perikatan Nasional)	BN–PH (2026–present)
Selangor	2023	571,110	21.3	12 / 56	12 / 31	▲6	▼2nd (Perikatan Nasional)	Opposition (2023–2026)
Selangor	2023	571,110	21.3	12 / 56	12 / 31	▲6	▼2nd (Perikatan Nasional)	PH–BN (2026–present)
Negeri Sembilan	2026	15,644	2.5	0 / 36	0 / 24	▼2	▼4th (BERSATU Plus)	No seats
Malacca	2026	15,428	3.2	0 / 28	0 / 7	▼2	▼5th	No seats
Johor	2026	46,072	2.5	0 / 56	0 / 16	▼2	3rd (Perikatan Nasional)	No seats
Sabah	2025	25,876	2.3	0 / 73	0 / 33	▼11	▼8th (Perikatan Nasional)	No seats
Sarawak	2021	Did not contest						No seats

Note

State election	State Legislative Assembly													
State election	Perlis	Kedah	Kelantan	Terengganu	Penang	Perak	Pahang	Selangor	Negeri Sembilan	Malacca	Johor	Sabah	Sarawak	Total won / Total contested
2/3 majority	2 / 3	2 / 3	2 / 3	2 / 3	2 / 3	2 / 3	2 / 3	2 / 3	2 / 3	2 / 3	2 / 3	2 / 3	2 / 3	
2018	0 / 15	5 / 36	0 / 45	0 / 32	2 / 40	1 / 59	0 / 42	6 / 56	0 / 36	2 / 28	8 / 56			24 / 104
2020												11 / 73		11 / 19
2021										2 / 28				2 / 15
2022											2 / 56			2 / 33
2022	5 / 15					9 / 59	2 / 42							16 / 45
2023		11 / 36	6 / 45	5 / 32	4 / 40			12 / 56	2 / 36					40 / 82
2025												0 / 73		0 / 33
2026									0 / 36	0 / 28	0 / 56		0 / 82	0 / 47

== See also ==
- Parti Pribumi Bersatu Malaysia Sabah
- List of political parties in Malaysia
- Malaysian General Election
- Politics of Malaysia
- Pakatan Harapan
- Perikatan Nasional
- 2020–21 Malaysian political crisis
