= Mustafa Kamal Ahmad =

Malaysian politician

Yang Berbahagia Dato' Mustafa Kamal Ahmad DSPN
- مصطفى كمال احمد

Member of the Penang State Legislative Assembly for Telok Ayer Tawar
- In office 9 May 2018 – 12 August 2023
- Preceded by: Jahara Hamid (BN–UMNO)
- Succeeded by: Azmi Alang (PN–BERSATU)
- Majority: 2,203 (2018)

Personal details
- Born: 2 December 1958 (age 67) Penang, Federation of Malaya (now Malaysia)
- Party: People's Justice Party (PKR)
- Other political affiliations: Pakatan Harapan (PH)
- Occupation: Politician

Yang Berbahagia Dato' Mustafa Kamal bin Ahmad (born 2 December 1958) is a Malaysian politician who has served as Member of the Penang State Legislative Assembly (MLA) for Telok Ayer Tawar from May 2018 to August 2023. He is a member of People's Justice Party (PKR), a component party of Pakatan Harapan (PH) coalitions.

His name was dropped in 2023 Penang state election, speculation that his son also PKR Deputy Secretary-General, Muhammad Zakwan Mustafa Kamal will replace him in Telok Ayer Tawar seat. However, another candidate contest in Telok Ayer Tawar seat.

== Election results ==
Penang State Legislative Assembly
Year	Constituency	Candidate	Votes	Pct	Opponent(s)	Votes	Pct	Ballots cast	Majority	Turnout
2018	N06 Telok Ayer Tawar	Mustafa Kamal Ahmad (PKR)	7,072	44.40%	Zamri Che Ros (UMNO)	4,869	30.60%	16,198	2,203	84.50%
2018	N06 Telok Ayer Tawar	Mustafa Kamal Ahmad (PKR)	7,072	44.40%	Mohamad Hanif Haron (PAS)	3,900	24.50%	16,198	2,203	84.50%
2018	N06 Telok Ayer Tawar	Mustafa Kamal Ahmad (PKR)	7,072	44.40%	Lee Thian Hong (PRM)	88	0.50%	16,198	2,203	84.50%

== Honours ==
- Penang
  - Officer of the Order of the Defender of State (DSPN) – Dato' (2020)
