= Megat Zulkarnain Omardin =

Malaysian politician

Yang Berbahagia Datuk Seri Megat Zulkarnain Omardin DGSM DCSM DPSM DJN AMS
- مڬت ذالقرنين عمردين

Political Secretary to the Deputy Prime Minister and Minister of Rural and Regional Development
- Incumbent
- Assumed office December 2022/January 2023
- Monarchs: Abdullah; Ibrahim Iskandar
- Prime Minister: Anwar Ibrahim
- Deputy Prime Minister and Minister: Ahmad Zahid Hamidi
- Preceded by: Muhamad Nur Aizat Noor Adam (Political Secretary to the Minister of Rural Development)

Senator
- In office 10 October 2016 – 9 October 2019
- Monarchs: Abdul Halim (2016); Muhammad V (2016–2019); Abdullah (2019)
- Prime Minister: Najib Razak (2016–2018); Mahathir Mohamad (2018–2019)
- In office 7 October 2013 – 6 October 2016
- Monarch: Abdul Halim
- Prime Minister: Najib Razak

State Chairman of Barisan Nasional of Selangor
- Incumbent
- Assumed office 25 November 2022
- National Chairman: Ahmad Zahid Hamidi
- Deputy: Johan Abd Aziz
- Preceded by: Noh Omar

State Chairman of the United Malays National Organisation of Selangor
- Incumbent
- Assumed office 25 November 2022
- President: Ahmad Zahid Hamidi
- Deputy: Johan Abd Aziz
- Preceded by: Noh Omar

Personal details
- Born: Megat Zulkarnain bin Omardin; 16 October 1969 (age 57) Kampung Gombak, Gombak, Selangor, Malaysia
- Citizenship: Malaysian
- Party: United Malays National Organisation (UMNO)
- Other political affiliations: Barisan Nasional (BN)
- Occupation: Politician

Megat Zulkarnain bin Omardin (born 16 October 1969) is a Malaysian politician who has served as Political Secretary to the Deputy Prime Minister and Minister of Rural and Regional Development Ahmad Zahid Hamidi since December 2022 or January 2023. He served as the Senator from October 2013 to October 2019. He is a member of the United Malays National Organisation (UMNO), a component party of the Barisan Nasional (BN) coalition. He has served as the State Chairman of BN and UMNO of Selangor since November 2022. He is the Member of the Supreme Council, Division Chief of UMNO of Gombak and the President of Malaysia Martial Arts Federation (PESAKA). He was the Division Deputy Chief of UMNO of Gombak prior to his promotion to the division chief.

== Political career ==
On 7 October 2013 Megat Zulkarnain was appointed to the Parliament as the Senator for the first term. On 10 October 2016, he was reappointed to the Parliament as the Senator for the second term.

=== 2018 Selangor state election ===
In the 2018 Selangor state election Megat Zulkarnain made his electoral debut after being nominated by BN to contest for the Gombak Setia state seat. He was not elected to the Selangor State Legislative Assembly as the Gombak Setia MLA after losing to Muhammad Hilman Idham of Pakatan Harapan (PH) by a minority of 13,044 votes.

=== 2023 Selangor state election ===
In the 2023 Selangor state election Megat Zulkarnain was renominated by BN to contest for the Gombak Setia state seat. He was not elected to the Selangor State Legislative Assembly as the Gombak Setia MLA again after narrowly losing to defending MLA Muhammad Hilman of Perikatan Nasional (PN) by a minority of only 58 votes.

=== 2022 general election ===
In the 2022 general election Megat Zulkarnain was renominated by BN to contest for the Gombak federal seat. He was not elected to Parliament as the Gombak MP after losing to Amirudin Shari of PH by a minority of 41,544 votes.

On 25 November 2022, Megat Zulkarnain was appointed as the new State Chairman of BN and UMNO of Selangor to replace Noh Omar by National Chairman of BN and President of UMNO Ahmad Zahid Hamidi.

In December 2022 or January 2023, Megat Zulkarnain was appointed as the Political Secretary to Deputy Prime Minister and Minister of Rural and Regional Development Ahmad Zahid.

== Personal life ==
Megat Zulkarnain was born on 16 October 1969 to Omardin Mauju, who is the founder of the Malaysian Agile Martial Arts Association (PSSLM).

== Election results ==
Parliament of Malaysia
Year	Constituency	Candidate	Votes	Pct	Opponent(s)	Votes	Pct	Ballots cast	Majority	Turnout
2022	P098 Gombak	Megat Zulkarnain Omardin (UMNO)	30,723	18.57%	Amirudin Shari (PKR)	72,267	43.69%	165,426	12,729	80.01%
2022	P098 Gombak	Megat Zulkarnain Omardin (UMNO)	30,723	18.57%	Mohamed Azmin Ali (BERSATU)	59,538	35.99%	165,426	12,729	80.01%
2022	P098 Gombak	Megat Zulkarnain Omardin (UMNO)	30,723	18.57%	Aziz Jamaludin Mhd Tahir (PEJUANG)	2,223	1.34%	165,426	12,729	80.01%
2022	P098 Gombak	Megat Zulkarnain Omardin (UMNO)	30,723	18.57%	Zulkifli Ahmad (IND)	675	0.41%	165,426	12,729	80.01%

Selangor State Legislative Assembly
Year	Constituency	Candidate	Votes	Pct	Opponent(s)	Votes	Pct	Ballots cast	Majority	Turnout
2018	N17 Gombak Setia	Megat Zulkarnain Omardin (UMNO)	11,113	23.63%	Muhammad Hilman Idham (PKR)	24,157	51.37%	47,028	12,399	85.86%
2018	N17 Gombak Setia	Megat Zulkarnain Omardin (UMNO)	11,113	23.63%	Hasbullah Mohd Ridzwan (PAS)	11,758	25.00%	47,028	12,399	85.86%
2023	N17 Gombak Setia	Megat Zulkarnain Omardin (UMNO)	30,241	49.08%	Muhammad Hilman Idham (BERSATU)	30,299	49.17%	88,480	58	70.10%
2023	N17 Gombak Setia	Megat Zulkarnain Omardin (UMNO)	30,241	49.08%	Mohamed Salim Mohamed Ali (IND)	1,076	1.75%	88,480	58	70.10%

== Honours ==
- Malacca
  - Grand Commander of the Exalted Order of Malacca (DGSM) – Datuk Seri (2026)
  - Commander of the Exalted Order of Malacca (DCSM) – Datuk Wira (2020)
  - Lieutenant of the Exalted Order of Malacca (DPSM) – Datuk (2011)
- Penang
  - Member of the Order of the Defender of State (DJN) (2003)
- Selangor
  - Member of the Order of the Crown of Selangor (AMS) (2002)
