= Nor Azam Karap =

Malaysian politician

Member of the Perlis State Legislative Assembly for Kuala Perlis
- In office 9 May 2018 – 19 December 2022
- Preceded by: Mat Hassan (BN–UMNO)
- Succeeded by: Abu Bakar Hamzah (PN–BERSATU)
- Majority: 1,254 (2018)

Deputy Branch Chief of the People's Justice Party of Kangar
- In office 2022–2025
- President: Anwar Ibrahim

Personal details
- Born: Nor Azam bin Karap; 31 October 1985 (age 40) Kampung Pulau Ketam, Kuala Perlis, Kangar, Perlis
- Party: People's Justice Party (PKR)
- Other political affiliations: Pakatan Harapan (PH)
- Occupation: Politician

Nor Azam bin Karap (born 31 October 1985) is a Malaysian politician who served as Member of the Perlis State Legislative Assembly (MLA) for Kuala Perlis from May 2018 to November 2022. He is a member, Deputy Branch Chief of the People's Justice Party of Kangar from 2022 to 2025, a component party of Pakatan Harapan (PH) coalitions.

== Political career ==
Nor Azam Karap was elected as Kuala Perlis assemblyman in May 2018 and lost reelected in November 2022. He also the Information Chief of the People's Justice Party of Perlis. In 2022, he was elected as Deputy Branch Chief of the People's Justice Party of Kangar and was lost reelected in 2025. He announced his candidacy for PKR member of central leadership council.

== Election results ==
Perlis State Legislative Assembly
Year	Constituency	Candidate	Votes	Pct	Opponent(s)	Votes	Pct	Ballots cast	Majority	Turnout
2018	N09 Kuala Perlis	Nor Azam Karap (PKR)	4,253	51.13%	Azam Rashid (UMNO)	2,999	36.06%	8,496	1,254	79.74%
2018	N09 Kuala Perlis	Nor Azam Karap (PKR)	4,253	51.13%	Mohamad Fuat Abu Bakar (PAS)	1,066	12.81%	8,496	1,254	79.74%
2022	N09 Kuala Perlis	Nor Azam Karap (PKR)	3,053	28.61%	Abu Bakar Hamzah (BERSATU)	3,207	30.06%	10,818	154	73.51%
2022	N09 Kuala Perlis	Nor Azam Karap (PKR)	3,053	28.61%	Azahar Ahmad (IND)	2,197	20.59%	10,818	154	73.51%
2022	N09 Kuala Perlis	Nor Azam Karap (PKR)	3,053	28.61%	Kamarudin Malek (UMNO)	2,145	20.10%	10,818	154	73.51%
2022	N09 Kuala Perlis	Nor Azam Karap (PKR)	3,053	28.61%	Muhamad Hairi Noordin (WARISAN)	68	0.54%	10,818	154	73.51%
