= Jahara Hamid =

Malaysian politician (born 1951)

Yang Berbahagia Dato' Jahara Hamid DSPN
- جاهرة حميد

State Leader of the Opposition of Penang
- In office 18 June 2013 – 2 August 2018
- Governor: Abdul Rahman Abbas
- Chief Minister: Lim Guan Eng
- Preceded by: Azhar Ibrahim
- Succeeded by: Muhamad Yusoff Mohd Noor

Member of the Penang State Legislative Assembly for Telok Ayer Tawar
- In office 25 April 1995 – 9 May 2018
- Preceded by: Rokiah Bee Hassan (BN–UMNO)
- Succeeded by: Mustafa Kamal Ahmad (PH–PKR)
- Majority: 5,836 (1995); 1,293 (1999); 3,984 (2004); 1,470 (2008); 840 (2013)

Personal details
- Born: 18 May 1951 (age 74) Anak Bukit, Alor Setar, Kedah, Federation of Malaya (now Malaysia)
- Citizenship: Malaysian
- Party: United Malays National Organisation (UMNO)
- Other political affiliations: Barisan Nasional (BN)
- Education: High School Bukit Mertajam
- Alma mater: Lincoln's Inn; University of Buckingham; University of Malaya; Maktab Perguruan Ilmu Khas
- Occupation: Politician
- Profession: Lawyer

Jahara binti Hamid (Jawi: جاهرة حميد, Malay pronunciation: [jahara]; born 18 May 1951) is a Malaysian politician and served as the former Leader of the Opposition of Penang and Member of the Penang State Legislative Assembly for Telok Ayer Tawar from 1995 to 2018. She was the first female state opposition leader in Malaysian history.

== Election results ==
Penang State Legislative Assembly
Year	Constituency	Candidate	Votes	Pct	Opponent(s)	Votes	Pct	Ballots cast	Majority	Turnout
1995	N06 Telok Ayer Tawar	Jahara Hamid (UMNO)	7,522	81.69%	Md Sheriff Saad (S46)	1,686	18.31%	10,098	5,836	77.56%
1999	N06 Telok Ayer Tawar	Jahara Hamid (UMNO)	5,525	56.63%	Mohd Ghazali Ibrahim (KeADILan)	4,232	43.37%	9,990	1,293	73.43%
2004	N06 Telok Ayer Tawar	Jahara Hamid (UMNO)	7,181	69.31%	Johari Kassim (PKR)	3,197	30.69%	10,583	3,984	78.51%
2008	N06 Telok Ayer Tawar	Jahara Hamid (UMNO)	6,478	56.40%	Norhayati Jaafar (PKR)	5,008	43.60%	11,705	1,470	93.60%
2013	N06 Telok Ayer Tawar	Jahara Hamid (UMNO)	8,040	52.80%	Norhayati Jaafar (PKR)	7,200	47.20%	15,471	840	86.70%

== Honours ==
- Penang
  - Officer of the Order of the Defender of State (DSPN) – Dato' (2002)
