= Mohd Taufik Yaacob =

Malaysian politician

Yang Berhormat Tuan Mohd Taufik Yaacob MLA

Member of the Kedah State Legislative Assembly for Bayu
- Incumbent
- Assumed office 12 August 2023
- Preceded by: Abd Nasir Idris (GS–PAS)
- Majority: 17,582 (2023)

Member of the Supreme Leadership Council of Malaysian United Indigenous Party
- Incumbent
- Assumed office 23 August 2020
- President: Muhyiddin Yassin

State Deputy Chairman of the Malaysian United Indigenous Party of Kedah
- Incumbent
- Assumed office 7 September 2020
- President: Muhyiddin Yassin
- State Chairman: Mohd Suhaimi Abdullah

Personal details
- Born: Mohd Taufik bin Yaacob
- Party: Malaysian United Indigenous Party (BERSATU)
- Other political affiliations: Pakatan Harapan (PH) (–2020); Perikatan Nasional (PN) (2020–present)

Mohd Taufik bin Yaacob is a Malaysian politician who has served as Member of the Kedah State Legislative Assembly (MLA) for Bayu since August 2023. He is a member of Malaysian United Indigenous Party (BERSATU), a component party of Perikatan Nasional (PN) and former Pakatan Harapan (PH) coalition. At the grassroots level, he is the Head of Bersatu Baling Division.

== Career ==
He was appointed as a Member of the RISDA on 15 May 2020 and is the Chairman of PERGETAH Baling. He also has a business called Bayu Rimba Enterprise.

== Election results ==
Parliament of Malaysia
Year	Constituency	Candidate	Votes	Pct	Opponent(s)	Votes	Pct	Ballots cast	Majority	Turnout
2018	P016 Baling	Mohd Taufik Yaacob (BERSATU)	14,472	15.99%	Abdul Azeez Abdul Rahim (UMNO)	38,557	42.60%	92,128	1,074	85.93%
2018	P016 Baling	Mohd Taufik Yaacob (BERSATU)	14,472	15.99%	Hassan Saad (PAS)	37,483	41.41%	92,128	1,074	85.93%

Kedah State Legislative Assembly
Year	Constituency	Candidate	Votes	Pct	Opponent(s)	Votes	Pct	Ballots cast	Majority	Turnout
2023	N30 Bayu	Mohd Taufik Yaacob (BERSATU)	27,287	73.76%	Ishak Mat (UMNO)	9,705	26.24%	37,259	17,582	78.25%
