= Bayu (state constituency) =

Political subdivision in Malaysia

Bayu (N30)
Kedah constituency

State constituency
- Legislature: Kedah State Legislative Assembly
MLA
Mohd Taufik Yaacob
PN
- Constituency created: 1974
- First contested: 1974
- Last contested: 2023

Demographics
- Electors (2023): 47,613

Bayu is a state constituency in Kedah, Malaysia, that is represented in the Kedah State Legislative Assembly.

== Demographics ==
As of 2020, Bayu has a population of 43,337 people.

Ethnic breakdown of Bayu's electorate as of 2023
1. Malay (93.0%)
2. Chinese (3.58%)
3. Other ethnicities (2.82%)
4. Indian (0.66%)

== History ==
=== Polling districts ===
According to the gazette issued on 30 March 2018, the Bayu constituency has a total of 28 polling districts.

State constituency	Polling districts	Code	Location
Bayu (N30）	Kampung Batu Lapan	016/30/01	Taman Ummi KEDA Kampung Batu 8
Bayu (N30）	Tanjong Pari	016/30/02	SK Tanjong Pari
Bayu (N30）	Kampung Weng	016/30/03	SK Seri Bayu
Bayu (N30）	Kampung Surau	016/30/04	SMK Siong
Bayu (N30）	Kampung Legong	016/30/05	Tadika KEDA Taman Ummi
Bayu (N30）	Kampung Lalang	016/30/06	SK Siong
Bayu (N30）	Kampung Luar	016/30/07	SJK (C) Kampung Lalang
Bayu (N30）	Kampung Bandar	016/30/08	SK Kampung Bandar
Bayu (N30）	Tandop	016/30/09	SK Penghulu Abu Bakar
Bayu (N30）	Bongor Mesjid	016/30/10	Maktab Mahmud Baling
Bayu (N30）	Bongor Sekolah	016/30/11	SMK Bongor
Bayu (N30）	Kampung Haji Abbas	016/30/12	Dewan Tabika Kampung Bawah Gunong
Bayu (N30）	Rambong Baling	016/30/13	Dewan Orang Ramai Kampung Rambong
Bayu (N30）	Batu 7 Jalan Kroh	016/30/14	SK Tunku Puan Habsah
Bayu (N30）	Simpang Empat	016/30/15	Tabika Perpaduan Kampung Simpat Empat
Bayu (N30）	Pekan Baling	016/30/16	SK Baling
Bayu (N30）	Bukit Baling	016/30/17	SK Tunku Putera
Bayu (N30）	Sebrang Baling	016/30/18	SJK (C) Yeok Chee
Bayu (N30）	Dalam Wang	016/30/19	SK Dalam Wang
Bayu (N30）	Pekan Pulai	016/30/20	SK Pulai
Bayu (N30）	Pokok Sena	016/30/21	SMK Baling
Bayu (N30）	Telok Teduri	016/30/22	SK Telok Teduri
Bayu (N30）	Sera Mesjid	016/30/23	SK Kampung Sera
Bayu (N30）	Telok Sera	016/30/24	SK Rambong Pulai
Bayu (N30）	Kampung Tiak	016/30/25	SK Tiak
Bayu (N30）	Bendang Padang	016/30/26	Taman Bimbingan Kanak-Kanak Kampung Bendang Bechah
Bayu (N30）	Kuala Kuang	016/30/27	SK Kuala Kuang
Bayu (N30）	Kampung Iboi	016/30/28	SK Iboi

=== Representation history ===
Kedah State Legislative Assemblyman for Bayu
Assembly	No	Years	Member	Party
Constituency created from Baling Timor
4th	N15	1974–1978	Abdul Rashid Hashim	Independent
5th	N15	1978–1982	Seroji Haron	BN (UMNO)
6th	N15	1982–1986	Raja Ariffin Raja Sulaiman	BN (UMNO)
7th	N15	1986–1990	Seroji Haron	BN (UMNO)
8th	N15	1990–1991	Seroji Haron	BN (UMNO)
8th	N15	1991–1995	Mohd Sibi Ahmad	BN (UMNO)
9th	N30	1995–1999	Mohd Sibi Ahmad	BN (UMNO)
10th	N30	1999–2004	Mohd Sibi Ahmad	BN (UMNO)
11th	N30	2004–2008	Mohd Salleh Yaacob	BN (UMNO)
12th	N30	2008–2013	Azmi Che Husain	BN (UMNO)
13th	N30	2013–2018	Azmi Che Husain	BN (UMNO)
14th	N30	2018–2020	Abdul Nasir Idris	PAS
14th	N30	2020–2023	Abdul Nasir Idris	PN (PAS)
15th	N30	2023–present	Mohd Taufik Yaacob	PN (BERSATU)

== Election results ==
Kedah state election, 2023
Party	Candidate	Votes	%	∆%
PN	Mohd Taufik Yaacob	27,287	73.76	▲73.76
BN	Ishak Mat	9,705	26.24	▼14.64
Total valid votes		36,992	100.00	
Total rejected ballots		222		
Unreturned ballots		45		
Turnout		37,259	78.25	▼7.55
Registered electors		47,613		
Majority		17,582	47.52	▲44.70
PN hold		Swing		

Kedah state election, 2018
Party	Candidate	Votes	%	∆%
PAS	Abdul Nasir Idris	14,339	43.70	▲0.51
BN	Mohamed Noor Mohamed Amin	13,415	40.88	▼15.93
PKR	Abd Rahim Kechik @ Wan Chik	5,059	15.42	▲15.42
Total valid votes		32,813	100.00	
Total rejected ballots		522		
Unreturned ballots		0		
Turnout		33,462	85.80	▼3.40
Registered electors		38,985		
Majority		924	2.82	▼10.80
PAS gain from BN		Swing		?

Kedah state election, 2013
Party	Candidate	Votes	%	∆%
BN	Azmi Che Husain	17,240	56.81	▲4.78
PAS	Mahmud Yaakob	13,108	43.19	▼4.78
Total valid votes		30,348	100.00	
Total rejected ballots		430		
Unreturned ballots		72		
Turnout		30,850	89.20	▲5.22
Registered electors		34,570		
Majority		4,132	13.62	▲8.56
BN hold		Swing		

Kedah state election, 2008
Party	Candidate	Votes	%	∆%
BN	Azmi Che Husain	12,590	52.03	▼1.89
PAS	Musoddak Hj Ahmad	11,606	46.97	▲1.89
Total valid votes		24,196	100.00	
Total rejected ballots		322		
Unreturned ballots		1		
Turnout		24,519	83.98	▼0.38
Registered electors		29,197		
Majority		984	5.06	▼2.78
BN hold		Swing		

Kedah state election, 2004
Party	Candidate	Votes	%	∆%
BN	Mohd Salleh Yaacob	12,354	53.92	▼2.34
PAS	Taib Azamuddin Md Taib	10,558	46.08	▲2.34
Total valid votes		22,912	100.00	
Total rejected ballots		293		
Unreturned ballots		55		
Turnout		23,270	84.36	▲4.96
Registered electors		27,583		
Majority		1,786	7.84	▼4.68
BN hold		Swing		

Kedah state election, 1999
Party	Candidate	Votes	%	∆%
BN	Mohd Sibi Ahmad	10,626	56.26	▼7.34
PAS	Mat Juki Ahamad	8,245	43.74	▲7.34
Total valid votes		17,899	100.00	
Total rejected ballots		371		
Unreturned ballots		311		
Turnout		19,533	79.40	▲2.94
Registered electors		24,601		
Majority		2,361	12.52	▼14.68
BN hold		Swing		

Kedah state election, 1995
Party	Candidate	Votes	%	∆%
BN	Mohd Sibi Ahmad	11,384	63.60	▲2.01
PAS	Mat Juki Ahamad	6,515	36.40	▼2.01
Total valid votes		17,899	100.00	
Total rejected ballots		402		
Unreturned ballots		55		
Turnout		18,356	76.46	▲1.14
Registered electors		24,006		
Majority		4,869	27.20	▲4.03
BN hold		Swing		

Kedah state by-election, 1991 Upon the death of incumbent, Seroji Haron
Party	Candidate	Votes	%	∆%
BN	Mohd Sibi Ahmad	9,545	61.59	▼6.67
PAS	Mohamad @ Md. Yusoff Ismail	5,953	38.41	▲38.41
Total valid votes		15,498	100.00	
Total rejected ballots		156		
Unreturned ballots		30		
Turnout		15,684	75.32	▼3.24
Registered electors		20,822		
Majority		3,592	23.18	▼13.34
BN hold		Swing		

Kedah state election, 1990
Party	Candidate	Votes	%	∆%
BN	Haji Seroji Haji Haron	10,793	68.26	▲2.76
S46	Ishak Ismail	5,019	31.74	▲31.74
Total valid votes		15,812	100.00	
Total rejected ballots		499		
Unreturned ballots		0		
Turnout		16,311	78.33	▲2.06
Registered electors		20,823		
Majority		5,774	36.52	▲5.52
BN hold		Swing		

Kedah state election, 1986
Party	Candidate	Votes	%	∆%
BN	Haji Seroji Haji Haron	9,396	65.50	▼1.30
PAS	Mohamad Junus	4,948	34.50	▲1.30
Total valid votes		14,344	100.00	
Total rejected ballots		437		
Unreturned ballots		0		
Turnout		14,781	76.27	▼1.88
Registered electors		19,380		
Majority		4,448	31.00	▼2.60
BN hold		Swing		

Kedah state election, 1982
Party	Candidate	Votes	%	∆%
BN	Raja Ariffin Raja Sulaiman	9,751	66.80	▲18.80
PAS	Ibrahim Mohamood	4,846	33.20	▼11.70
Total valid votes		14,597	100.00	
Total rejected ballots		330		
Unreturned ballots		0		
Turnout		14,927	78.15	▼0.76
Registered electors		19,099		
Majority		4,905	33.60	▲30.59
BN hold		Swing		

Kedah state election, 1978
Party	Candidate	Votes	%	∆%
BN	Haji Seroji Haji Haron	6,189	48.00	▲5.69
PAS	Ibrahim Mohamood	5,801	44.99	▲44.99
Independent	Abu Bakar Haji Sarda	903	7.01	▲7.01
Total valid votes		12,893	100.00	
Total rejected ballots		628		
Unreturned ballots		0		
Turnout		13,501	78.91	▲1.61
Registered electors		17,108		
Majority		368	3.01	▼12.37
BN gain from Independent		Swing		?

Kedah state election, 1974
Party	Candidate	Votes	%
Independent	Mat Rasit @ Abdul Rashid Hashim	6,834	57.69
BN	Harun Abdullah	5,012	42.31
Total valid votes		11,846	100.00
Total rejected ballots		153	
Unreturned ballots		0	
Turnout		11,999	77.30
Registered electors		15,522	
Majority		1,822	15.38
This was a new constituency created.
