= Kuang (state constituency) =

State constituency in Selangor, Malaysia

Kuang (N13)
Selangor constituency

State constituency
- Legislature: Selangor State Legislative Assembly
MLA
Mohd Rafiq Mohd Abdullah
PN
- Constituency created: 1958
- First contested: 1959
- Last contested: 2023

Demographics
- Electors (2023): 45,606

Kuang is a state constituency in Selangor, Malaysia, that has been represented in the Selangor State Legislative Assembly since 1959. It has been represented by Mohd Rafiq Mohd Abdullah of Perikatan Nasional (PN) since 2023.

The state constituency was created in the 1958 redistribution and is mandated to return a single member to the Selangor State Legislative Assembly under the first past the post voting system.

== Demographics ==
Ethnic breakdown of Kuang's electorate as of 2023
1. Malay (76.8%)
2. Chinese (9.90%)
3. Indian (8.36%)
4. Other ethnicities (4.95%)

== History ==
=== Polling districts ===
According to the federal gazette issued on 30 March 2018, the Kuang constituency is divided into 9 polling districts.

State constituency	Polling Districts	Code	Location
Kuang (N13）	Pengkalan Khndong	097/13/01	SJK (C) Kundang
Kuang (N13）	Sungai Serai	097/13/02	SK Sungai Serai Kuang
Kuang (N13）	Pekan Kuang	097/13/03	SJK (T) Kuang
Kuang (N13）	Kampung Gombak	097/13/04	SRA Kuang Batu 18 ¾
Kuang (N13）	Kampung Kuang	097/13/05	SK Kuang
Kuang (N13）	Kampung Cempedak	097/13/06	SA Rakyat Al Manarah
Kuang (N13）	Sri Kundang	097/13/07	SK Seri Kundang
Kuang (N13）	Bandar Tasik Puteri	097/13/08	SMK Bandar Tasik Puteri
Kuang (N13）	Penjara Sungai Buloh	097/13/09	SA Rakyat Al Manarah

=== Representation history ===
Members of the Legislative Assembly for Kuang
Assembly	No	Years	Member	Party
Constituency created
1st	N08	1959-1964	Chong Shih Guan (張士元)	Alliance (MCA)
2nd	N08	1964-1969	Oon Seng Lee (溫成利)	Alliance (MCA)
		1969-1971	Assembly dissolved	
3rd	N08	1971-1973	Chew Ngan @ Chou Yew Koh (周耀高)	GERAKAN
3rd	N08	1973-1974	Chew Ngan @ Chou Yew Koh (周耀高)	BN (GERAKAN)
Constituency abolished, split into Rawang, Gombak and Bukit Raja
Constituency created from Paya Jaras and Rawang
11th	N13	2004-2008	Soohaimi Abdul Rahman	BN (UMNO)
12th	N13	2008-2013	Abdul Shukur Idrus	BN (UMNO)
13th	N13	2013-2018	Abdul Shukur Idrus	BN (UMNO)
14th	N13	2018-2020	Sallehudin Amiruddin	PH (BERSATU)
14th	N13	2020–2023	Sallehudin Amiruddin	PEJUANG
15th	N13	2023–present	Mohd Rafiq Mohd Abdullah	PN (BERSATU)

== Election results ==
Selangor state election, 2023
Party	Candidate	Votes	%	∆%
PN	Mohd Rafiq Mohd Abdullah	18,494	55.37	▲55.37
BN	Hasnal Rezua Merican Habib Merican	13,619	40.78	▲9.80
Independent	Sallehudin Amiruddin	1,287	3.85	▲3.85
Total valid votes		33,400	100.00	
Total rejected ballots		206		
Unreturned ballots		84		
Turnout		33,690	73.87	▼12.45
Registered electors		45,606		
Majority		4,875	14.59	▲1.90
PN gain from PH		Swing		?

Selangor state election, 2018
Party	Candidate	Votes	%	∆%
PKR	Sallehudin Amiruddin	9,845	43.67	▼2.79
BN	Abdul Shukur Idrus	6,985	30.98	▼21.45
PAS	Mohd Fauzan Madzlan	5,672	25.16	▲25.16
Parti Rakyat Malaysia	Mohd Rafie Mohammad Arif	44	0.19	▲0.19
Total valid votes		22,546	100.00	
Total rejected ballots		187		
Unreturned ballots		125		
Turnout		22,858	86.32	▲5.45
Registered electors		26,481		
Majority		2,860	12.69	▲8.89
PKR gain from BN		Swing		?

Selangor state election, 2013
Party	Candidate	Votes	%	∆%
BN	Abdul Shukur Idrus	11,027	52.43	▲0.53
PKR	Tenku Maraziyah Tenku Sulaiman	9,772	46.46	▼1.64
Independent	Zahariman Abd Latip	233	1.11	▲1.11
Total valid votes		21,032	100.00	
Total rejected ballots		378		
Unreturned ballots		53		
Turnout		21,463	88.26	▲7.39
Registered electors		24,319		
Majority		1,255	5.97	▲2.17
BN hold		Swing		
Source(s) "Federal Government Gazette - Notice of Contested Election, State Legislative Assembly for the State of Selangor [P.U. (B) 192/2013]" (PDF). Attorney General's Chambers of Malaysia. 26 April 2013. Archived from the original (PDF) on 2019-12-29. "Federal Government Gazette - Results of Contested Election and Statements of the Poll after the Official Addition of Votes, State Constituencies for the State of Selangor [P.U. (B) 233/2013]" (PDF). Attorney General's Chambers of Malaysia. 22 May 2013. Archived from the original (PDF) on 2018-10-02.

Selangor state election, 2008
Party	Candidate	Votes	%	∆%
BN	Abdul Shukur Idrus	7,049	51.90	▼19.98
PKR	Badrulamin Bahron	6,532	48.10	▲19.98
Total valid votes		13,581	100.00	
Total rejected ballots		204		
Unreturned ballots		413		
Turnout		14,198	80.87	▲4.75
Registered electors		17,557		
Majority		517	3.80	▼39.76
BN hold		Swing		

Selangor state election, 2004
Party	Candidate	Votes	%	∆%
BN	Soohaimi Abdul Rahman	8,016	71.78	
PKR	Abdul Rahim Abdul Wahab	3,151	28.22	
Total valid votes		11,167	100.00	
Total rejected ballots		288		
Unreturned ballots		212		
Turnout		11,667	76.12	
Registered electors		15,328		
Majority		4,865	43.56	
BN gain from GERAKAN		Swing		?

Selangor state election, 1969
Party	Candidate	Votes	%	∆%
GERAKAN	Chew Ngan @ Chou Yew Koh	3,119	42.52	▲42.52
Alliance	Oon Seng Lee	3,088	42.09	▼19.13
PMIP	Mohd. Yusuf Ma'aya	1,129	15.39	▲1.48
Total valid votes		7,336	100.00	
Total rejected ballots		611		
Unreturned ballots		0		
Turnout		7,947	73.34	▼5.96
Registered electors		10,836		
Majority		31	0.43	▼35.92
GERAKAN gain from Alliance Party (Malaysia) Party (Malaysia)		Swing		?

Selangor state election, 1964
Party	Candidate	Votes	%	∆%
Alliance	Oon Seng Lee	4,185	61.22	▼11.77
Socialist Front	Azai Karim	1,700	24.87	▲24.87
PMIP	Mohamed Anwar Hashim	951	13.91	▼13.10
Total valid votes		6,836	100.00	
Total rejected ballots		362		
Unreturned ballots		0		
Turnout		7,198	79.30	▼1.88
Registered electors		9,077		
Majority		2,485	36.35	▼9.65
Alliance hold		Swing		

Selangor state election, 1959
Party	Candidate	Votes	%
Alliance	Chong Shih Guan	3,923	72.99
PMIP	Abdullah Mat Junan	1,452	27.01
Total valid votes		5,375	100.00
Total rejected ballots		151	
Unreturned ballots		0	
Turnout		5,526	81.18
Registered electors		6,807	
Majority		2,471	45.98
This was a new constituency created.
