= Abu Bakar Hamzah =

Malaysian politician

Yang Amat Berhormat Tuan Abu Bakar Hamzah AMP PPN PMP PJK MLA

11th Menteri Besar of Perlis
- Incumbent
- Assumed office 28 December 2025
- Monarch: Sirajuddin
- Preceded by: Mohd Shukri Ramli
- Constituency: Kuala Perlis

Member of the Perlis State Executive Council (Tourism, Arts and Culture & Rural Development)
- In office 25 November 2024 – 25 December 2025
- Monarch: Sirajuddin
- Menteri Besar: Mohd Shukri Ramli
- Preceded by: Wan Badariah Wan Saad (Tourism, Arts and Culture); Razali Saad (Rural Development)
- Constituency: Kuala Perlis

Member of the Perlis State Legislative Assembly for Kuala Perlis
- Incumbent
- Assumed office 19 November 2022
- Preceded by: Nor Azam Karap (PH–PKR)
- Majority: 154 (2022)

Faction represented in Perlis State Legislative Assembly
- 2022–: Perikatan Nasional

Personal details
- Born: Abu Bakar bin Hamzah; 15 September 1968 (age 58) Perlis, Malaysia
- Citizenship: Malaysian
- Party: Malaysian United Indigenous Party (BERSATU)
- Other political affiliations: Perikatan Nasional (PN)
- Spouse: Puan Paridah
- Education: Kolej Vokasional Kangar
- Occupation: Politician

Abu Bakar bin Hamzah is a Malaysian politician who has served as Menteri Besar of Perlis since December 2025. He had served as Member of the Perlis State Executive Council (EXCO) in the Perikatan Nasional (PN) state administration under Menteri Besar Mohd Shukri Ramli since November 2024 and Member of the Perlis State Legislative Assembly (MLA) for Kuala Perlis since November 2022. He is a member of the Malaysian United Indigenous Party (BERSATU), a component party of the PN coalition. He is State Deputy Chairman I of PN of Perlis, State Chairman of BERSATU of Perlis and Division Chief of BERSATU of Kangar.

== Political career ==
=== Member of the Perlis State Legislative Assembly (since 2022) ===
==== 2022 Perlis state election ====
In the 2022 Perlis state election, Abu Bakar made his electoral debut after being nominated by PN to contest for the Kuala Perlis state seat. He won the seat and was elected into the Perlis State Legislative Assembly as the Kuala Perlis MLA after narrowly defeating defending MLA Nor Azam Karap of Pakatan Harapan (PH), independent candidate Azahar Ahmad, Kamarudin Malek of Barisan Nasional (BN) and Muhamad Hairi Noordin of the Heritage Party (WARISAN) by the majority of only 154 votes.

=== Member of the Perlis State Executive Council (since 2024) ===
On 25 November 2024, the Perlis EXCO was reshuffled for the second time after only a year, Abu Bakar was finally appointed as the Perlis State EXCO Member by Menteri Besar Mohd Shukri after two times of not being appointed to the position. He was given the portfolios of Tourism, Arts and Culture, a portfolio previously held by EXCO Member Wan Badariah Wan Saad and Rural Development, a portfolio formerly helmed by EXCO Member Razali Saad.

== Controversies and issues ==
=== Claims of the Perlis Malaysian Islamic Party turmoil ===
On 27 October 2023, Abu Bakar claimed that Perlis Malaysian Islamic Party (PAS) led by Menteri Besar of Perlis Mohd Shukri as the State Commissioner was in the midst of internal turmoil, infighting and row over a number of issues related to religious understanding and governance. He said the situation in Perlis PAS has resulted in uneasiness among Perlis PN and the state administration. He later insisted that Perlis PAS must not hide its problems, divisions and tensions and called for clarification and intervention on its situation to quell the issues and build the strength of Perlis PN together. In reply to the claims, President of PAS Abdul Hadi Awang issued a stern warning against any acts of sabotage that could lead to the collapse of any of the PN state administrations.

=== Dissatisfaction of not being appointed as Member of the Perlis State Executive Council ===
On 16 November 2023, the Perlis State Executive Council (EXCO) was reshuffled by Menteri Besar Mohd Shukri. Three MLAs of BERSATU, Titi Tinggi MLA Izizam Ibrahim, Pauh MLA Megat Hashirat Hassan were reappointed and Tambun Tulang MLA Wan Zikri Afthar Ishak was appointed as Perlis EXCO Members while Abu Bakar as the Perlis PN Deputy Chairman I, Perlis BERSATU Chairman and Kuala Perlis MLA was not appointed as Perlis EXCO Member. He expressed his regret and disappointment at Mohd Shukri for not appointing him to the position despite being asked and urged by Chairman of PN and President of BERSATU Muhyiddin Yassin who nominated, proposed and supported Abu Bakar to become Perlis EXCO Member, to do so, describing it as an act of disregard, disrespect and betrayal against Muhyiddin. He stressed that this is the second time he was not appointed, the first time was when the Perlis PN state administration was first formed in November 2022. He also alleged Izizam and Megat Hashirat for 'stabbing his back' and 'masterminding a scheme' in effort to prevent Mohd Shukri from appointing him. In addition, he added that Mohd Shukri should have discussed the appointments of Perlis EXCO Members with him in the Perlis PN state leadership, which its meeting has never been called since the 2022 state election. Therefore, he declared 'war' on Mohd Shukri and demanded him to step down as the Menteri Besar. In response to the declaration, Izizam, also the Perlis BERSATU Deputy Chairman, asked his State Chairman Abu Bakar not to overreact but to discuss with the PN state leadership first before making any remarks. In addition, he advised Abu Bakar to be patient and focus on helping the public. He said Abu Bakar appeared to be wanting to fight everyone. He also denied the allegations that he had 'stabbed the back' of Abu Bakar, highlighting that he had no right to influence the decisions of Mohd Shukri who was older and more politically experienced than him as well as noting that sacrifices often needed to be made as some individuals would gain certain positions at the expense of others.

== Election results ==
Perlis State Legislative Assembly
Year	Constituency	Candidate	Votes	Pct	Opponent(s)	Votes	Pct	Ballots cast	Majority	Turnout
2022	N09 Kuala Perlis	Abu Bakar Hamzah (BERSATU)	3,207	30.06%	Nor Azam Karap (PKR)	3,053	28.61%	10,670	154	72.50%
2022	N09 Kuala Perlis	Abu Bakar Hamzah (BERSATU)	3,207	30.06%	Azahar Ahmad (IND)	2,197	20.59%	10,670	154	72.50%
2022	N09 Kuala Perlis	Abu Bakar Hamzah (BERSATU)	3,207	30.06%	Kamarudin Malek (UMNO)	2,145	20.10%	10,670	154	72.50%
2022	N09 Kuala Perlis	Abu Bakar Hamzah (BERSATU)	3,207	30.06%	Muhamad Hairi Noordin (WARISAN)	68	0.64%	10,670	154	72.50%

== Honours ==
- Malaysia
  - Medal of the Order of the Defender of the Realm (PPN) (2002)
- Perlis
  - Member of the Order of the Crown of Perlis (AMP) (2014)
  - Medal of the Order of the Crown of Perlis (PMP) (2010)
  - Recipient of the Meritorious Service Medal (PJK) (2001)
  - Recipient of Tuanku Syed Sirajuddin Jamalullail Silver Jubilee Medal (2025)
