= Gombak Setia =

State constituency of Malaysia

Gombak Setia (N17)
Selangor constituency

State constituency
- Legislature: Selangor State Legislative Assembly
MLA
Muhammad Hilman Idham
PN
- Constituency created: 1984
- First contested: 1986
- Last contested: 2018

Demographics
- Electors (2023): 88,480

Gombak Setia is a state constituency in Selangor, Malaysia, that has been represented in the Selangor State Legislative Assembly since 1986. It has been represented by Muhammad Hilman Idham of Perikatan Nasional (PN) since 2020 and of Pakatan Harapan (PH) from 2018 to 2020.

The state constituency was created in the 1984 redistribution and is mandated to return a single member to the Selangor State Legislative Assembly under the first past the post voting system.

== Demographics ==
Ethnic breakdown of Gombak Setia's electorate as of 2023
1. Malay (67.2%)
2. Chinese (11.8%)
3. Other ethnicities (11.7%)
4. Indian (9.36%)

== History ==
=== Polling districts ===
According to the federal gazette issued on 30 March 2018, the Gombak Setia constituency is divided into 15 polling districts.

State constituency	Polling districts	Code	Location
Gombak Setia （N17）	Sri Gombak 9	098/17/01	SA Rakyat Ubudiah
Gombak Setia （N17）	Taman Greenwood	098/17/02	SMK Seri Gombak
Gombak Setia （N17）	Simpang Tiga	098/17/03	SK Sungai Pusu
Gombak Setia （N17）	Batu 8 Gombak	098/17/04	SK Gombak Utara
Gombak Setia （N17）	Gombak Selatan	098/17/05	SK Gombak Setia
Gombak Setia （N17）	Gombak Setia	098/17/06	SMK Gombak Setia
Gombak Setia （N17）	Sri Gombak 1	098/17/07	SK Taman Seri Gombak 2
Gombak Setia （N17）	Sri Gombak 2–7	098/17/08	SMK Hillcrest
Gombak Setia （N17）	Taman Gombak	098/17/09	Dewan Majlis Perbandaran Selayang Taman Gombak
Gombak Setia （N17）	Batu 9 Gombak	098/17/10	Kolej Vokasional Gombak (SM Teknik Gombak)
Gombak Setia （N17）	Taman Kamariah	098/17/11	SK Gombak 1
Gombak Setia （N17）	Sri Gombak 10	098/17/12	SK Taman Seri Gombak
Gombak Setia （N17）	Sri Gombak 8	098/17/13	SA Rakyat (KAFA Integrasi) Jabal Nur
Gombak Setia （N17）	Pinggiran Batu Caves	098/17/14	SA Rakyat (KAFA Integrasi) Al-Kahfi
Gombak Setia （N17）	Taman Samudera	098/17/15	SK Taman Samudera

=== Representation history ===
Members of the Legislative Assembly for Gombak Setia
Assembly	No	Years	Member	Party
Constituency created from Gombak
7th	N17	1986-1990	Kaharudin Momin	BN (UMNO)
8th	N17	1990-1995	Ahmad Bhari Abd Rahman	BN (UMNO)
9th	N17	1995-1999	Rakibah Abdul Manap	BN (UMNO)
10th	N17	1999-2004	Ismail Kamus	BA (PAS)
11th	N17	2004-2008	Yuszahari Mohd Yusoff	BN (UMNO)
12th	N17	2008-2012	Hasan Mohamed Ali	PR (PAS)
12th	N17	2012-2013	Hasan Mohamed Ali	Independent
13th	N17	2013-2018	Hasbullah Mohd Ridzwan	PR (PAS)
14th	N17	2018-2020	Muhammad Hilman Idham	PH (PKR)
14th	N17	2020–2023	Muhammad Hilman Idham	PN (BERSATU)
15th	N17	2023–present	Muhammad Hilman Idham	PN (BERSATU)

== Election results ==
Selangor state election, 2023: Gombak Setia
Party	Candidate	Votes	%	∆%
PN	Muhammad Hilman Idham	30,299	49.17	▲49.17
BN	Megat Zulkarnain Omardin	30,241	49.08	▲25.45
Independent	Mohd Salim Mohd Ali	1,076	1.75	▲1.75
Total valid votes		61,616	100.00	
Total rejected ballots		297		
Unreturned ballots		114		
Turnout		62,027	70.10	▼15.76
Registered electors		88,480		
Majority		58	0.09	▼26.28
PN gain from PKR		Swing		?

Selangor state election, 2018: Gombak Setia
Party	Candidate	Votes	%	∆%
PKR	Muhammad Hilman Idham	24,157	51.37	▲51.37
PAS	Hasbullah Mohd Ridzwan	11,758	25.00	▼27.11
BN	Megat Zulkarnain Omardin	11,113	23.63	▼24.26
Total valid votes		47,028	100.00	
Total rejected ballots		328		
Unreturned ballots		263		
Turnout		47,619	85.86	▼1.37
Registered electors		55,461		
Majority		12,399	26.37	▲22.15
PKR gain from PAS		Swing		?

Selangor state election, 2013: Gombak Setia
Party	Candidate	Votes	%	∆%
PAS	Hasbullah Mohd Ridzwan	20,757	52.11	▼3.27
BN	Said Anuar Said Ahmad	19,076	47.89	▲3.27
Total valid votes		39,833	100.00	
Total rejected ballots		378		
Unreturned ballots		165		
Turnout		40,376	87.23	▲10.82
Registered electors		46,285		
Majority		1,681	4.22	▼6.54
PAS hold		Swing		
Source(s) "Federal Government Gazette - Notice of Contested Election, State Legislative Assembly for the State of Selangor [P.U. (B) 192/2013]" (PDF). Attorney General's Chambers of Malaysia. 26 April 2013. Archived from the original (PDF) on 2019-12-29. "Federal Government Gazette - Results of Contested Election and Statements of the Poll after the Official Addition of Votes, State Constituencies for the State of Selangor [P.U. (B) 233/2013]" (PDF). Attorney General's Chambers of Malaysia. 22 May 2013. Archived from the original (PDF) on 2018-10-02.

Selangor state election, 2008: Gombak Setia
Party	Candidate	Votes	%	∆%
PAS	Hasan Mohamed	14,391	55.38	▲11.50
BN	Yuszahari Mohd Yusoff	11,594	44.62	▼11.50
Total valid votes		25,985	100.00	
Total rejected ballots		287		
Unreturned ballots		454		
Turnout		26,726	76.41	▲7.77
Registered electors		34,979		
Majority		2,797	10.76	▼1.48
PAS gain from BN		Swing		?

Selangor state election, 2004: Gombak Setia
Party	Candidate	Votes	%	∆%
BN	Yuszahari Mohd Yusoff	12,506	56.12	▲8.22
PAS	Ismail Kamus	9,778	43.88	▼8.22
Total valid votes		22,284	100.00	
Total rejected ballots		163		
Unreturned ballots		0		
Turnout		22,447	68.64	▼7.42
Registered electors		32,701		
Majority		2,728	12.24	▲8.04
BN gain from PAS		Swing		?

Selangor state election, 1999: Gombak Setia
Party	Candidate	Votes	%	∆%
PAS	Ismail Kamus	11,821	52.10	▲33.72
BN	Abdul Ghani Mohd Yatim	10,868	47.90	▼33.72
Total valid votes		22,689	100.00	
Total rejected ballots		229		
Unreturned ballots		0		
Turnout		22,918	76.06	▲5.44
Registered electors		30,133		
Majority		953	4.20	▼59.04
PAS gain from BN		Swing		?

Selangor state election, 1995: Gombak Setia
Party	Candidate	Votes	%	∆%
BN	Rakibah Abdul Manap	15,050	81.62	▲4.94
PAS	Saleh Huddin Mohd Nasir	3,389	18.38	▼4.94
Total valid votes		18,439	100.00	
Total rejected ballots		235		
Unreturned ballots		175		
Turnout		18,849	70.62	▼1.54
Registered electors		26,691		
Majority		11,661	63.24	▲9.88
BN hold		Swing		

Selangor state election, 1990: Gombak Setia
Party	Candidate	Votes	%	∆%
BN	Ahmad Bhari Abd Rahman	15,323	76.68	▼8.41
PAS	Baharin Othman	4,659	23.32	▲8.41
Total valid votes		19,982	100.00	
Total rejected ballots			546	
Unreturned ballots		0		
Turnout		20,528	72.16	▲11.06
Registered electors		28,449		
Majority		10,664	53.36	▼16.82
BN hold		Swing		

Selangor state election, 1986: Gombak Setia
Party	Candidate	Votes	%
BN	Kaharudin Momin	10,962	85.09
PAS	Ahmad Najih Yusof	1,921	14.91
Total valid votes		12,883	100.00
Total rejected ballots		270	
Unreturned ballots		0	
Turnout		13,153	61.10
Registered electors		21,526	
Majority		9,041	70.18
This was a new constituency created.
