= Azmi Alang =

Malaysian politician

Yang Berhormat Tuan Azmi Alang MLA
- عزمي الڠ

Member of the Penang State Legislative Assembly for Telok Ayer Tawar
- Incumbent
- Assumed office 12 August 2023
- Preceded by: Mustafa Kamal Ahmad (PH–PKR)
- Majority: 1,947 (2023)

Personal details
- Born: Azmi bin Alang
- Citizenship: Malaysian
- Party: Malaysian United Indigenous Party (BERSATU)
- Other political affiliations: Perikatan Nasional (PN)
- Occupation: Politician

Azmi bin Alang is a Malaysian politician who has served as Member of the Penang State Legislative Assembly (MLA) for Telok Ayer Tawar since August 2023. He is a member and Division Chief of Tasek Gelugor of the Malaysian United Indigenous Party (BERSATU), a component party of the Perikatan Nasional (PN) coalition.

== Member of the Penang State Legislative Assembly (since 2023) ==
On 29 November 2024, Azmi, as the Telok Ayer Tawar MLA, unexpectedly called for a 'motion' to increase the salaries of the Penang MLAs during the Penang State Legislative Assembly meeting. He opened a news article in Chinese on his phone, pointing out that Negeri Sembilan MLAs were getting a salary increase. Hence, he hoped for the Penang MLAs to follow suit. Chief Minister Chow Kon Yeow added that the issue did not need a reply as he had already addressed it during the state Budget 2025 presentation in the assembly. Speaker Law Choo Kiang responded by saying that the assembly had already heard the calls for a salary increase of the MLAs and would let the assembly explore the matter.

== Election results ==
Penang State Legislative Assembly
Year	Constituency	Candidate	Votes	Pct	Opponent(s)	Votes	Pct	Ballots cast	Majority	Turnout
2023	N06 Telok Ayer Tawar	Azmi Alang (BERSATU)	10,223	55.26%	Abdul Mohsein Mohd Shariff (PKR)	8,276	44.74%	18,630	1,947	75.17%
