= Telok Ayer Tawar =

State constituency in Penang, Malaysia

Telok Ayer Tawar (N06)
Penang constituency

State constituency
- Legislature: Penang State Legislative Assembly
MLA
Azmi Alang
PN
- Constituency created: 1986
- First contested: 1986
- Last contested: 2023

Demographics
- Electors (2023): 24,784
- Area (km²): 18

Telok Ayer Tawar is a state constituency in Penang, Malaysia, that has been represented in the Penang State Legislative Assembly.

The state constituency was first contested in 1986 and is mandated to return a single Assemblyman to the Penang State Legislative Assembly under the first-past-the-post voting system.

== Definition ==
=== Polling districts ===
According to the federal gazette issued on 30 March 2018, the Telok Ayer Tawar constituency is divided into 8 polling districts.

State constituency	Polling districts	Code	Location
Telok Ayer Tawar (N06)	Telok Ayer Tawar	042/06/01	SK Telok Ayer Tawar
Telok Ayer Tawar (N06)	Permatang Binjai	042/06/02	SK Permatang Binjai
Telok Ayer Tawar (N06)	Pekan Darat	042/06/03	SK Permatang To'Jaya
Telok Ayer Tawar (N06)	Taman Senangan	042/06/04	SK Taman Senangan
Telok Ayer Tawar (N06)	Mata Kuching	042/06/05	SMK Datuk Onn
Telok Ayer Tawar (N06)	Jalan Masjid	042/06/06	SMK St Mark
Telok Ayer Tawar (N06)	Taman Wira	042/06/07	SMK Telok Air Tawar
Telok Ayer Tawar (N06)	Taman Perkasa	042/06/08	SJK (C) Li Hwa

== Demographics ==
Ethnic breakdown of Telok Ayer Tawar's electorate as of 2023
1. Malay (64.8%)
2. Chinese (23.8%)
3. Indian (10.1%)
4. Other ethnicities (1.25%)

Total electors by polling district in 2016
Polling district	Electors
Telok Ayer Tawar	3,544
Permatang Binjai	1,450
Pekan Darat	1,299
Taman Senangan	1,975
Mata Kuching	3,003
Jalan Masjid	4,603
Taman Wira	1,265
Taman Perkasa	793
Total	17,932
Source: Malaysian Election Commission

== History ==
Penang State Legislative Assemblyman for Telok Ayer Tawar
Assembly	No	Years	Member	Party
Constituency created from Penaga and Bagan Ajam
7th	N06	1986–1990	Abd Ro'ni A. Hasan	BN (UMNO)
8th	N06	1990–1995	Rokiah Bee Hassan	BN (UMNO)
9th	N06	1995–1999	Jahara Hamid	BN (UMNO)
10th	N06	1999–2004	Jahara Hamid	BN (UMNO)
11th	N06	2004–2008	Jahara Hamid	BN (UMNO)
12th	N06	2008–2013	Jahara Hamid	BN (UMNO)
13th	N06	2013–2018	Jahara Hamid	BN (UMNO)
14th	N06	2018–2023	Mustafa Kamal Ahmad	PH (PKR)
15th	N06	2023–present	Azmi Alang	PN (BERSATU)

== Election results ==
Penang state election, 2023: Telok Ayer Tawar
Party	Candidate	Votes	%	∆%
PN	Azmi Alang	10,223	55.26	▲55.26
PH	Mohsein Md Shariff	8,276	44.74	▲0.34
Total valid votes		18,499	100.00	
Total rejected ballots		109		
Unreturned ballots		22		
Turnout		18,630	75.17	▼9.33
Registered electors		24,784		
Majority		1,947	10.52	▼3.28
PN gain from PKR		Swing		?

Penang state election, 2018: Telok Ayer Tawar
Party	Candidate	Votes	%	∆%
PKR	Mustafa Kamal Ahmad	7,072	44.40	▼2.80
BN	Zamri Che Ros	4,869	30.60	▼22.20
PAS	Mohamad Hanif Haron	3,900	24.50	▲24.50
Parti Rakyat Malaysia	Lee Thian Hong	88	0.50	▲0.50
Total valid votes		15,929	100.00	
Total rejected ballots		219		
Unreturned ballots		50		
Turnout		16,198	84.50	▼2.20
Registered electors		19,172		
Majority		2,203	13.80	▲8.20
PKR gain from BN		Swing		?
Source(s) "His Majesty's Government Gazette - Notice of Contested Election, State Legislative Assembly for the State of Penang [P.U. (B) 252/2018]" (PDF). Attorney General's Chambers of Malaysia. 3 May 2018. "Federal Government Gazette - Results of Contested Election and Statements of the Poll after the Official Addition of Votes, State Constituencies for the State of Penang [P.U. (B) 326/2018]" (PDF). Attorney General's Chambers of Malaysia. 28 May 2018. Archived from the original (PDF) on 2019-08-29.

Penang state election, 2013: Telok Ayer Tawar
Party	Candidate	Votes	%	∆%
BN	Jahara Hamid	8,040	52.80	▼3.80
PKR	Norhayati Jaafar	7,200	47.20	▲3.80
Total valid votes		15,240	100.00	
Total rejected ballots		231		
Unreturned ballots		0		
Turnout		15,471	86.70	▼6.90
Registered electors		17,835		
Majority		840	5.60	▼7.20
BN hold		Swing		
Source(s) "Federal Government Gazette - Notice of Contested Election, State Legislative Assembly for the State of Penang [P.U. (B) 189/2013]" (PDF). Attorney General's Chambers of Malaysia. 26 April 2013. "Federal Government Gazette - Results of Contested Election and Statements of the Poll after the Official Addition of Votes, State Constituencies for the State of Penang [P.U. (B) 230/2013]" (PDF). Attorney General's Chambers of Malaysia. 22 May 2013. Archived from the original (PDF) on 2019-03-22.

Penang state election, 2008: Telok Ayer Tawar
Party	Candidate	Votes	%	∆%
BN	Jahara Hamid	6,478	56.40	▼12.91
PKR	Norhayati Jaafar	5,008	43.60	▲12.91
Total valid votes		11,486	100.00	
Total rejected ballots		199		
Unreturned ballots		20		
Turnout		11,705	93.60	▲15.09
Registered electors		12,509		
Majority		1,470	12.80	▼25.82
BN hold		Swing		

Penang state election, 2004: Telok Ayer Tawar
Party	Candidate	Votes	%	∆%
BN	Jahara Hamid	7,181	69.31	▲12.68
PKR	Johari Kassim	3,179	30.69	▼12.68
Total valid votes		10,360	100.00	
Total rejected ballots		205		
Unreturned ballots		0		
Turnout		10,583	78.51	▲5.08
Registered electors		13,479		
Majority		3,984	38.62	▲25.36
BN hold		Swing		

Penang state election, 1999: Telok Ayer Tawar
Party	Candidate	Votes	%	∆%
BN	Jahara Hamid	5,525	56.63	▼25.06
PKR	Mohd Ghazali Ibrahim	4,232	43.37	▲43.37
Total valid votes		9,757	100.00	
Total rejected ballots		232		
Unreturned ballots		1		
Turnout		9,990	73.43	▼4.13
Registered electors		13,604		
Majority		1,293	13.26	▼50.12
BN hold		Swing		

Penang state election, 1995: Telok Ayer Tawar
Party	Candidate	Votes	%	∆%
BN	Jahara Hamid	7,522	81.69	▲9.20
S46	Md Sheriff Saad	1,686	18.31	▼9.20
Total valid votes		9,208	100.00	
Total rejected ballots		299		
Unreturned ballots		591		
Turnout		10,098	77.56	▲1.69
Registered electors		13,019		
Majority		5,836	63.38	▲18.40
BN hold		Swing		

Penang state election, 1990: Telok Ayer Tawar
Party	Candidate	Votes	%	∆%
BN	Rokiah Bee Hassan	6,711	72.49	▲3.62
S46	Naser Mohd Razi	2,547	27.51	▲27.51
Total valid votes		9,258	100.00	
Total rejected ballots		442		
Unreturned ballots		0		
Turnout		9,700	75.87	▲5.36
Registered electors		12,785		
Majority		4,164	44.98	▲7.24
BN hold		Swing		

Penang state election, 1986: Telok Ayer Tawar
Party	Candidate	Votes	%
BN	Abd Ro'ni A. Hasan	4,692	68.87
PAS	Khalid Man	2,121	31.13
Total valid votes		6,813	100.00
Total rejected ballots		230	
Unreturned ballots		0	
Turnout		7,043	70.51
Registered electors		9,988	
Majority		2,571	37.74
This was a new constituency created.

== See also ==
- Constituencies of Penang
