= Hilman Idham =

Malaysian politician

Yang Berhomat Tuan Muhammad Hilman Idham MLA

Member of the Selangor State Legislative Assembly for Gombak Setia
- Incumbent
- Assumed office 9 May 2018
- Preceded by: Hasbullah Mohd Ridzwan (PR–PAS)
- Majority: 12,399 (2018); 58 (2023)

Deputy Youth Chief of the People's Justice Party
- In office 16 November 2018 – 24 February 2020
- President: Anwar Ibrahim
- Youth Chief: Akmal Nasrullah Mohd Nasir
- Preceded by: Afif Bahardin
- Succeeded by: Mohd Kamil bin Abdul Munim

3rd Youth Chief of the Malaysian United Indigenous Party
- Incumbent
- Assumed office 29 October 2024
- President: Muhyiddin Yassin
- Deputy: Hamzah Zainudin
- Preceded by: Wan Ahmad Fayhsal Wan Ahmad Kamal

Personal details
- Born: Muhammad Hilman bin Idham; 2 February 1989 (age 37) Klang, Selangor, Malaysia
- Party: People's Justice Party (PKR) (2015–2020); Malaysian United Indigenous Party (BERSATU) (since 2020)
- Other political affiliations: Pakatan Harapan (PH) (2015–2020); Perikatan Nasional (PN) (since 2020)
- Occupation: Politician

Muhammad Hilman bin Idham (born 2 February 1989) is a Malaysian politician who has served as Member of the Selangor State Legislative Assembly (MLA) for Gombak Setia since May 2018. He is a member of the Malaysian United Indigenous Party (BERSATU), a component party of the Perikatan Nasional (PN) coalition and was a member of the People's Justice Party (PKR), a component of the Pakatan Harapan (PH) coalition.

== Political career ==
During his time as a student in Universiti Kebangsaan Malaysia, Hilman was the president of the Kumpulan Aktivis Mahasiswa Independen (KAMI) and participated in forums and public discussions on political and community issues.

Hilman served as political secretary to Azmin Ali during his time as Minister of Economic Affairs (2018-2020) and Senior Minister of International Trade and Industry (2020-2022).

Hilman then succeeded Wan Ahmad Fayhsal as the 3rd Youth Chief of BERSATU.

=== Legal Issues ===
In July 2024, an aide to Hilman Idham, Zulfahimin Mahdzir, was sentenced to 13 years in prison and received two strokes of the rotan for raping an acquaintance of Hilman. The Kuala Lumpur sessions court ruled that Zulfahimin failed to raise any reasonable doubt in his defence. The incident, which occurred in December 2020, involved the victim being intoxicated at the time. The case highlighted issues of intimidation and the victim's struggle to seek justice.

== Election results ==
Selangor State Legislative Assembly
Year	Constituency	Candidate	Votes	Pct	Opponent(s)	Votes	Pct	Ballots cast	Majority	Turnout
2018	N17 Gombak Setia	Muhammad Hilman Idham (PKR)	24,157	51.37%	Hasbullah Mohd Ridzwan (PAS)	11,758	25.00%	47,619	12,399	85.86%
2018	N17 Gombak Setia	Muhammad Hilman Idham (PKR)	24,157	51.37%	Megat Zulkarnain Omardin (UMNO)	11,113	23.63%	47,619	12,399	85.86%
2023	N17 Gombak Setia	Muhammad Hilman Idham (BERSATU)	30,299	49.17%	Megat Zulkarnain Omardin (UMNO)	30,241	49.08%	62,027	58	70.10%
2023	N17 Gombak Setia	Muhammad Hilman Idham (BERSATU)	30,299	49.17%	Mohamed Salim Mohamed Ali (IND)	1,076	1.75%	62,027	58	70.10%
