= Kuala Perlis (state constituency) =

Malaysian state legislative constituency in Perlis

Kuala Perlis (N09)
Perlis constituency

State constituency
- Legislature: Perlis State Legislative Assembly
MLA
Abu Bakar Hamzah
PN
- Constituency created: 1958
- First contested: 1959
- Last contested: 2022

Demographics
- Electors (2022): 14,717

Kuala Perlis is a state constituency in Perlis, Malaysia, that has been represented in the Perlis State Legislative Assembly. It has been represented by Abu Bakar Hamzah of Perikatan Nasional (PN) since 2022.

The state constituency was created in 1958. It was first contested in 1959 and is mandated to return a single Assemblyman to the Perlis State Legislative Assembly under the first-past-the-post voting system.

== Definition ==
=== Polling districts ===
According to the federal gazette issued on 31 October 2022, the Kuala Perlis constituency is divided into 9 polling districts.

State constituency	Polling Districts	Code	Location
Kuala Perlis (N09)	Seberang Alor	002/09/01	SK Seberang Ramai
Kuala Perlis (N09)	Hujong Tanjong	002/09/02	SJK (C) Khay Beng
Kuala Perlis (N09)	Kepala Batas	002/09/03	SK Kuala Perlis
Kuala Perlis (N09)	Seberang Tok Pi	002/09/04	SMK Kuala Perlis
Kuala Perlis (N09)	Padang Besar Selatan	002/09/05	SK Padang Besar Selatan

== Demographics ==
Ethnic breakdown of Kuala Perlis's electorate as of 2022
1. Malay (77.7%)
2. Chinese (20.8%)
3. Other ethnicities (1.33%)
4. Indian (0.14%)

Total electors by polling district in 2016
Polling district	Electors
Seberang Alor	963
Hujong Tanjong	1,685
Kepala Batas	3,183
Seberang Tok Pi	2,716
Padang Besar Selatan	1,519
Total	10,066
Source: Malaysian Election Commission

== History ==
Members of the Legislative Assembly for Kuala Perlis
Assembly	No	Years	Member	Party
Constituency created
1st	N11	1959–1964	Yusoff Abu Bakar	Alliance (UMNO)
2nd	N11	1964–1969	Sheikh Ahmad Mohd Hashim	Alliance (UMNO)
		1969–1971	Assembly dissolved	
3rd	N11	1971–1973	Sheikh Ahmad Mohd Hashim	Alliance (UMNO)
3rd	N11	1973–1974	Sheikh Ahmad Mohd Hashim	BN (UMNO)
4th	N07	1974–1978	Mohamed Noor Yub	BN (UMNO)
5th	N07	1978–1982	Mohamed Noor Yub	BN (UMNO)
6th	N07	1982–1986	Ahmad Osman	BN (UMNO)
7th	N08	1986–1990	Ahmad Osman	BN (UMNO)
8th	N08	1990–1995	Abd Karim @ Ibrahim Mat Salleh	BN (UMNO)
9th	N09	1995–1999	Abd Karim @ Ibrahim Mat Salleh	BN (UMNO)
10th	N09	1999–2004	Bakar Saad	BN (UMNO)
11th	N09	2004–2008	Bakar Saad	BN (UMNO)
12th	N09	2008–2013	Mat Hassan	BN (UMNO)
13th	N09	2013–2018	Mat Hassan	BN (UMNO)
14th	N09	2018–2022	Nor Azam Karap	PH (PKR)
15th	N09	2022–present	Abu Bakar Hamzah	PN (BERSATU)

== Election results ==
Perlis state election, 2022
Party	Candidate	Votes	%	∆%
PN	Abu Bakar Hamzah	3,207	30.06	▲30.06
PH	Nor Azam Karap	3,053	28.61	▲28.61
Independent	Azahar Ahmad	2,197	20.59	▲20.59
BN	Kamarudin Malek	2,145	20.10	▼15.96
Heritage	Muhamad Hairi Noordin	68	0.54	▲0.54
Total valid votes		8,318	100.00	
Total rejected ballots		144		
Unreturned ballots		34		
Turnout		8,496	79.74	▼3.80
Registered electors		10,654		
Majority		154	1.81	▼14.82
PN gain from PKR		Swing		?

Perlis state election, 2018
Party	Candidate	Votes	%	∆%
PKR	Nor Azam Karap	4,253	51.13	▲10.59
BN	Azam Rashid	2,999	36.06	▼21.11
PAS	Mohamad Fuat Haji Abu Bakar	1,066	12.81	▲12.81
Total valid votes		8,323	100.00	
Total rejected ballots		149		
Unreturned ballots		8		
Turnout		8,480	83.55	▲4.82
Registered electors		10,150		
Majority		1,384	16.63	▼22.92
PKR gain from BN		Swing		?

Perlis state election, 2013
Party	Candidate	Votes	%	∆%
BN	Mat Hassan	4,758	57.17	▼12.60
PKR	Noor Amin Ahmad	3,374	40.54	▲40.54
Independent	Shaari Ludin	191	2.29	▲2.29
Total valid votes		8,323	100.00	
Total rejected ballots		149		
Unreturned ballots		8		
Turnout		8,480	83.55	▲4.82
Registered electors		10,150		
Majority		1,384		
BN hold		Swing		
Source(s) "Federal Government Gazette - Notice of Contested Election, State Legislative Assembly for the State of Perlis [P.U. (B) 185/2013]" (PDF). Attorney General's Chambers of Malaysia. 26 April 2013. "Federal Government Gazette - Results of Contested Election and Statements of the Poll after the Official Addition of Votes, State Constituencies for the State of Perlis [P.U. (B) 226/2013]" (PDF). Attorney General's Chambers of Malaysia. 22 May 2013.

Perlis state election, 2008
Party	Candidate	Votes	%	∆%
BN	Mat Hassan	4,448	69.77	▼3.13
PAS	Ahmad Tajuddin Salleh	1,927	30.23	▲30.23
Total valid votes		6,375	100.00	
Total rejected ballots		135		
Unreturned ballots		14		
Turnout		6,524	78.73	▼0.11
Registered electors		8,287		
Majority		2,521	39.55	▼6.25
BN hold		Swing		

Perlis state election, 2004
Party	Candidate	Votes	%	∆%
BN	Bakar Saad	4,495	72.90	▲11.23
PKR	Mohd Yusoff Ubi @ Madarsa	1,671	27.10	▲27.10
Total valid votes		6,166	100.00	
Total rejected ballots		155		
Unreturned ballots		5		
Turnout		6,326	78.84	▲0.41
Registered electors		8,024		
Majority		2,824	45.80	▲22.45
BN hold		Swing		

Perlis state election, 1999
Party	Candidate	Votes	%	∆%
BN	Bakar Saad	3,487	61.67	▼9.55
PAS	Nadzaharuddin Mohd. Noor	2,167	38.33	▲9.55
Total valid votes		5,654	100.00	
Total rejected ballots		148		
Unreturned ballots		22		
Turnout		5,824	78.43	▲4.99
Registered electors		7,426		
Majority		1,320	23.35	▼19.10
BN hold		Swing		

Perlis state election, 1995
Party	Candidate	Votes	%	∆%
BN	Abd Karim @ Ibrahim Mat Salleh	3,690	71.22	▲17.81
PAS	Ahmad Tajuddin Salleh	1,491	28.78	▲28.78
Total valid votes		5,181	100.00	
Total rejected ballots		129		
Unreturned ballots		0		
Turnout		5,310	73.43	▼2.91
Registered electors		7,231		
Majority		2,199	42.44	▲35.62
BN hold		Swing		

Perlis state election, 1990
Party	Candidate	Votes	%	∆%
BN	Abd Karim @ Ibrahim Mat Salleh	2,668	53.41	▼7.23
S46	Zahri Abas	2,327	46.59	▲46.59
Total valid votes		4,995	100.00	
Total rejected ballots		161		
Unreturned ballots		0		
Turnout		5,156	76.34	▲1.47
Registered electors		6,754		
Majority		341	6.83	▼14.45
BN hold		Swing		

Perlis state election, 1986
Party	Candidate	Votes	%	∆%
BN	Ahmad Osman	2,556	60.64	▼6.66
PAS	Din Saaid	1,659	39.36	▲6.66
Total valid votes		4,215	100.00	
Total rejected ballots		158		
Unreturned ballots		0		
Turnout		4,373	74.87	▼1.60
Registered electors		5,841		
Majority		897	21.28	▼13.33
BN hold		Swing		

Perlis state election, 1982
Party	Candidate	Votes	%	∆%
BN	Ahmad Osman	3,061	67.30	▲8.26
PAS	Din Said	1,487	32.70	▼8.26
Total valid votes		4,548	100.00	
Total rejected ballots		130		
Unreturned ballots		0		
Turnout		4,678	76.46	▼1.66
Registered electors		6,118		
Majority		1,574	34.61	▲16.54
BN hold		Swing		

Perlis state election, 1978
Party	Candidate	Votes	%	∆%
BN	Mohamed Noor Yub	2,303	59.04	▼2.86
PAS	Din Said	1,598	40.96	▲40.96
Total valid votes		3,901	100.00	
Total rejected ballots		245		
Unreturned ballots		0		
Turnout		4,146	78.12	▲1.30
Registered electors		5,307		
Majority		705	18.07	▼5.73
BN hold		Swing		

Perlis state election, 1974
Party	Candidate	Votes	%	∆%
BN	Mohamed Noor Yub	2,031	61.90	▲61.90
Parti Rakyat Malaysia	Osman Abdul Rahman	1,250	38.10	▲31.85
Total valid votes		3,281	100.00	
Total rejected ballots		345		
Unreturned ballots		0		
Turnout		3,626	76.82	▼0.69
Registered electors		4,720		
Majority		781	23.80	▼0.97
BN hold		Swing		

Perlis state election, 1969
Party	Candidate	Votes	%	∆%
Alliance	Sheikh Ahmad Mohd Hashim	1,744	59.26	▼11.26
PMIP	Ali Abdullah	1,015	34.49	▲5.01
Parti Rakyat Malaysia	Man Hashim	184	6.25	▲6.25
Total valid votes		2,943	100.00	
Total rejected ballots		173		
Unreturned ballots		0		
Turnout		3,116	77.51	▼3.35
Registered electors		4,020		
Majority		729	24.77	▼16.27
Alliance hold		Swing		

Perlis state election, 1964
Party	Candidate	Votes	%	∆%
Alliance	Sheikh Ahmad Mohd Hashim	1,770	70.52	▼3.89
PMIP	Yahaya Abdullah	740	29.48	▲3.89
Total valid votes		2,510	100.00	
Total rejected ballots		182		
Unreturned ballots		0		
Turnout		2,692	80.87	▼1.63
Registered electors		3,329		
Majority		1,030	41.04	▼7.79
Alliance hold		Swing		

Perlis state election, 1959
Party	Candidate	Votes	%
Alliance	Yusoff Abu Bakar	1,556	74.41
PMIP	Omar Mohd Said	535	25.59
Total valid votes		2,091	100.00
Total rejected ballots		35	
Unreturned ballots		0	
Turnout		2,126	82.50
Registered electors		2,577	
Majority		1,021	48.83
This was a new constituency created.
