= Mohd Rafiq Mohd Abdullah =

Malaysian politician

Yang Berhormat Tuan Mohd Rafiq Mohd Abdullah BCM MLA

Member of the Selangor State Legislative Assembly for Kuang
- Incumbent
- Assumed office 12 August 2023
- Preceded by: Sallehudin Amiruddin (PH–BERSATU)
- Majority: 4,875 (2023)

Member of the Supreme Council of the Malaysian United Indigenous Party
- Incumbent
- Assumed office 23 August 2020
- President: Muhyiddin Yassin

Division Chief of the Malaysian United Indigenous Party of Sungai Buloh
- Incumbent
- Assumed office 12 October 2018
- President: Muhyiddin Yassin
- Chairman: Mahathir Mohamad (2018–2020); Muhyiddin Yassin (Acting, 24 February–23 August 2020)
- Preceded by: Zulkafperi Hanapi

Personal details
- Born: Mohd Rafiq bin Mohd Abdullah; 7 August 1975 (age 50) Kuala Lumpur, Malaysia
- Citizenship: Malaysian
- Party: Malaysian United Indigenous Party (BERSATU)
- Other political affiliations: Pakatan Harapan (PH) (–2020); Perikatan Nasional (PN) (since 2020)
- Occupation: Politician

Mohd Rafiq bin Mohd Abdullah is a Malaysian politician who has served as Member of the Selangor State Legislative Assembly (MLA) for Kuang since August 2023. He is a member of the Malaysian United Indigenous Party (BERSATU), a component party of the Perikatan Nasional (PN) and formerly Pakatan Harapan (PH) coalitions. He has served as Member of the Supreme Council of BERSATU since August 2020 and Division Chief of BERSATU of Sungai Buloh since October 2018.

== Political career ==
=== Member of the Selangor State Legislative Assembly (since 2023) ===
==== 2023 Selangor state election ====
In the 2023 Selangor state election, Mohd Rafiq made his electoral debut after being nominated by PN to contest the Kuang state seat. Mohd Rafiq won the seat and was elected to the Selangor State Legislative Assembly as the Kuang MLA for the first term after defeating Hasnal Rezua Merican Habib Merican of Barisan Nasional (BN) and independent candidate Sallehudin Amiruddin who was defending the seat by a majority of 4,875 votes.

On 19 August 2023, Mohd Rafiq, as the Kuang MLA, characterised that a government is the government that acts fairly towards all the elected representatives. He attributed the excessive politicking in Malaysia to the issue of unfair government allocations given to the elected representatives and highlighted that fair government allocations would be able to solve the political problems. He further said that it was hard for the elected representatives to serve the people without enough allocations where there was a double standard in the issue. He also called for an end to the politics of revenge where the opposition elected representatives were not given government allocations and the people were victimised. Furthermore, he pointed out that there were government allocations but were not given to the elected representatives but the coordinators to carry out activities. Moreover, he revealed that the salaries of the opposition elected representatives went to help the people but they were far from enough and the elected representatives were forced to find other financial sources. Furthermore, he stated that the 22 opposition Selangor MLAs would voice loud and clear opposition in the state legislative assembly if the fair government allocations were not given to the opposition MLAs.

== Election results ==
Selangor State Legislative Assembly
Year	Constituency	Candidate	Votes	Pct	Opponent(s)	Votes	Pct	Ballots cast	Majority	Turnout
2023	N13 Kuang	Mohd Rafiq Mohd Abdullah (BERSATU)	18,494	55.37%	Hasnal Rezua Merican Habib Merican (UMNO)	13,619	40.78%	33,400	4,875	73.24%
2023	N13 Kuang	Mohd Rafiq Mohd Abdullah (BERSATU)	18,494	55.37%	Sallehudin Amiruddin (IND)	1,287	3.85%	33,400	4,875	73.24%

== Honours ==
- Malacca
  - Recipient of the Distinguished Service Star (BCM) (2019)
