= Mohd Suhaimi Abdullah =

Malaysian politician

Yang Berhormat Dato' Mohd Suhaimi Abdullah DSNS JP MP
- محمد سحيمي عبدالله

Member of the Malaysian Parliament for Langkawi
- Incumbent
- Assumed office 19 November 2022
- Preceded by: Mahathir Mohamad (PEJUANG)
- Majority: 13,518 (2022)

Senator Elected by the Kedah State Legislative Assembly
- In office 17 August 2017 – 16 August 2020 Serving with Ananthan Somasundaram
- Monarchs: Muhammad V (2017–2019); Abdullah (2019–2020)
- Prime Minister: Najib Razak (2017–2018); Mahathir Mohamad (2018–2020); Muhyiddin Yassin (2020)
- Preceded by: Saiful Izham Ramli
- Succeeded by: Ahmad Saad @ Yahaya & Othman Aziz
- In office 30 May 2014 – 29 May 2017 Serving with Shahanim Mohamad Yusoff
- Monarchs: Abdul Halim (2014–2016); Muhammad V (2016–2017)
- Prime Minister: Najib Razak
- Preceded by: Muhamad Yusof Husin
- Succeeded by: Himself

Faction represented in Dewan Rakyat
- 2022–: Perikatan Nasional

Faction represented in Dewan Negara
- 2014–2018: Barisan Nasional
- 2018–2020: Pakatan Harapan

Personal details
- Born: Mohd Suhaimi bin Abdullah; 15 July 1955 (age 71) Malaysia
- Party: United Malays National Organisation (UMNO) (–2018); Malaysian United Indigenous Party (BERSATU) (since 2018)
- Other political affiliations: Barisan Nasional (BN) (–2018); Pakatan Harapan (PH) (2018–2020); Perikatan Nasional (PN) (since 2020)
- Occupation: Politician

Mohd Suhaimi bin Abdullah (born 15 July 1955) is a Malaysian politician who has served as the Member of Parliament (MP) for Langkawi since November 2022. He served as the Senator from May 2014 to May 2017 and again from August 2017 to August 2020. He is a member of the Malaysian United Indigenous Party (BERSATU), a component party of the Perikatan Nasional (PN) and formerly Pakatan Harapan (PH) coalitions and was a member of the United Malays National Organisation (UMNO), a component party of the Barisan Nasional (BN) coalition. He is the State Chairman of BERSATU of Kedah. On 28 November 2018, Mohd Suhaimi left UMNO for BERSATU.

== Political career ==
=== Senator (2014–2020) ===
On 30 May 2014, Mohd Suhaimi was elected to the Parliament as the Senator representing Kedah for the first term after being nominated and approved by the Kedah State Legislative Assembly. (Note: Took and subscribed the Oath on 30 May 2014 under S.O. 4(3). Hansard - 30 May 2014)

On 15 August 2017, Mohd Suhaimi was reelected as Senator representing Kedah for the second term after being renominated and reapproved by the assembly.

=== Member of Parliament (since 2022) ===
In the 2022 general election, Mohd Suhaimi made his electoral debut after being nominated by PN to contest for the Langkawi federal seat. He won the seat and was elected to the Parliament as the Langkawi MP for the first term after defeating Armishah Siraj of BN, Zabidi Yahya of PH, former Prime Minister Mahathir Mohamad of the Homeland Fighters Party (PEJUANG) and independent candidate Abd Kadir Sainudin by a majority of 13,518 votes. As the elected MP for Langkawi, he was infamous for sexually insulting Seputeh MP Teresa Kok in parliament by inviting her to come to Langkawi without wearing anything.

== Election results ==
Parliament of Malaysia
Year	Constituency	Candidate	Votes	Pct	Opponent(s)	Votes	Pct	Ballots cast	Majority	Turnout
2022	P004 Langkawi	Mohd Suhaimi Abdullah (BERSATU)	25,463	53.63%	Armishah Siraj (UMNO)	11,945	25.16%	48,123	13,518	71.10%
2022	P004 Langkawi	Mohd Suhaimi Abdullah (BERSATU)	25,463	53.63%	Zabidi Yahya (AMANAH)	5,417	11.41%	48,123	13,518	71.10%
2022	P004 Langkawi	Mohd Suhaimi Abdullah (BERSATU)	25,463	53.63%	Mahathir Mohamad (PEJUANG)	4,566	9.62%	48,123	13,518	71.10%
2022	P004 Langkawi	Mohd Suhaimi Abdullah (BERSATU)	25,463	53.63%	Abd Kadir Sainudin (IND)	89	0.19%	48,123	13,518	71.10%

== Honours ==
=== Honours of Malaysia ===
- Malaysia
  - Recipient of the 17th Yang di-Pertuan Agong Installation Medal (2024)
- Kedah
  - Justice of the Peace (JP) (2017)
- Negeri Sembilan
  - Knight Companion of the Order of Loyalty to Negeri Sembilan (DSNS) – Dato' (1998)
