= Nolee Ashilin Mohammed Radzi =

Malaysian politician

Yang Berbahagia Dato' Nolee Ashilin Mohammed Radzi DPCM PPN PJK
- نولي أشلين محمّد راضي

Member of the Perak State Executive Council
- In office 15 December 2020 – 21 November 2022
- Monarch: Nazrin Shah
- Menteri Besar: Saarani Mohamad
- Portfolio: Housing, Local Government & Tourism
- Preceded by: Herself
- Succeeded by: Sandrea Ng Shy Ching (Housing & Local Government); Loh Sze Yee (Tourism)
- Constituency: Tualang Sekah
- In office 31 March 2020 – 5 December 2020
- Monarch: Nazrin Shah
- Menteri Besar: Ahmad Faizal Azumu
- Portfolio: Housing, Local Government & Tourism
- Preceded by: Paul Yong Choo Kiong (Housing & Local Government); Tan Kar Hing (Tourism)
- Succeeded by: Herself
- Constituency: Tualang Sekah
- In office 12 May 2014 – 12 May 2018
- Monarchs: Nazrin Shah (2014–2018)
- Menteri Besar: Zambry Abdul Kadir
- Portfolio: Tourism, Art, Culture, Communication & Multimedia
- Preceded by: Herself (Tourism & Culture); Portfolio established (Art); Shahrul Zaman Yahya (Communication & Multimedia)
- Succeeded by: Tan Kar Hing (Tourism, Art & Culture); Hasnul Zulkarnain Abdul Munaim (Communication & Multimedia)
- In office 18 May 2013 – 12 May 2014
- Monarchs: Azlan Shah (2013–2014)
- Menteri Besar: Zambry Abdul Kadir
- Portfolio: Health, Tourism & Culture
- Preceded by: Mah Hang Soon (Health); Hamidah Osman (Tourism); Zainol Fadzi Paharudin (Culture)
- Succeeded by: Mah Hang Soon (Health); Herself (Tourism & Culture)
- Constituency: Tualang Sekah

Member of the Perak State Legislative Assembly for Tualang Sekah
- In office 8 March 2008 – 19 November 2022
- Preceded by: Mohammed Radzi Manan (BN–UMNO)
- Succeeded by: Mohd Azlan Helmi (PH–PKR)
- Majority: 1,569 (2008); 2,046 (2013); 1,099 (2018)

3rd Vice Women Chief of the Malaysian United Indigenous Party
- Incumbent
- Assumed office 28 October 2024
- President: Muhyiddin Yassin
- Women Chief: Mas Ermieyati Samsudin
- Preceded by: Mas Ermieyati Samsudin

Faction represented in the Perak State Legislative Assembly
- 2008–2018: Barisan Nasional
- 2018–2020: Independent
- 2020–2022: Perikatan Nasional

Personal details
- Born: Nolee Ashilin binti Mohammed Radzi; 4 January 1975 (age 51) Perak, Malaysia
- Citizenship: Malaysian
- Party: United Malays National Organisation (UMNO) (until 2018); Independent (2018–2020); Malaysian United Indigenous Party (BERSATU) (since 2020)
- Other political affiliations: Barisan Nasional (BN) (until 2018); Perikatan Nasional (PN) (since 2020)
- Relations: Ahmad Faizal Azumu (Brother-in-law)
- Parent: Mohammed Radzi Manan
- Occupation: Politician

Nolee Ashilin binti Mohammed Radzi (born 4 January 1975) is a Malaysian politician who served as Member of the Perak State Executive Council (EXCO) in the Barisan Nasional (BN) and Perikatan Nasional (PN) state administrations under Menteris Besar Zambry Abdul Kadir, Ahmad Faizal Azumu and Saarani Mohamad from May 2013 to May 2018, March to December 2020 and again from December 2020 to November 2022 as well as Member of Perak State Legislative Assembly (MLA) for Tualang Sekah from March 2008 to November 2022. She is a member of the Malaysian United Indigenous Party (BERSATU), a component party of the PN coalition and was an independent as well as member of the United Malays National Organisation (UMNO), a component party of the BN coalition. She has served as the 3rd Vice Women Chief of BERSATU since October 2024.

== Political career ==
=== Member of the Perak State Executive Council (2013–2018 & 2020–2022) ===
==== First term ====
On 18 May 2013, Nolee Ashilin was appointed as Perak EXCO Member for the first term in charge of Health, Tourism and Culture by Menteri Besar Zambry. She lost the position after BN state administration collapsed as a result of the 2018 Perak state election which elected a hung assembly. On 13 May 2018, she, as BN MLA for Tualang Sekah, declared support for PH to form the new state administration.

==== Second term ====
On 13 March 2020, the PH state administration collapsed as a result of the 2020 Malaysian political crisis after Menteri Besar Ahmad Faizal resigned and other PH MLAs defected from PH to form a new PN state administration. On 31 March 2020, Ahmad Faizal reappointed Nolee Ashilin as the Perak EXCO Member for the second term in charge of Housing, Local Government and Tourism. On 5 December 2020, the PN state administration collapsed after Ahmad Faizal resigned as Menteri Besar for the second time after losing the vote of a motion of no confidence tabled by a BN MLA. She lost the EXCO Member position for the second time as well.

==== Third term ====
On 15 December 2020, Menteri Besar Saarani reappointed Nolee Ashilin as the Perak EXCO Member for the third term in charge of the same portfolios during her second term. On 21 November 2022, she lost the Perak EXCO Member position for the third time after she no longer served as a Perak MLA and Saarani was reappointed Menteri Besar to lead a new state coalition government comprising BN and PH.

=== Member of the Perak State Legislative Assembly (2008–2022) ===
==== 2008 Perak state election ====
In the 2008 Perak state election, Nolee Ashilin made her electoral debut after being nominated by BN to contest for the Tualang Sekah state seat. She won the seat and was elected to the Perak State Legislative Assembly as the Tualang Sekah MLA for the first term.

==== 2013 Perak state election ====
In the 2013 Perak state election, Nolee Ashilin was renominated by BN to defend the Tualang Sekah seat. She defended the seat and was reelected to the Perak Assembly as the Tualang Sekah MLA for the second term.

==== 2018 Perak state election ====
In the 2018 Perak state election, Nolee Ashilin was renominated by BN to defend the Tualang Sekah seat. She defended the seat and was reelected to the Perak Assembly as the Tualang Sekah MLA for the third term.

==== 2022 general election ====
Nolee Ashilin moved from the Perak state politics to the federal politics by contesting in the 2022 general election and not in the 2022 Perak state election. She was renominated by PN to contest for the Tanjong Malim federal seat. She was not elected to the Parliament as the Member of Parliament (MP) for Tanjong Malim after losing to defending MP Chang Lih Kang of PH.

=== Party politics ===
On 18 January 2019, Nolee Ashilin clarified that her UMNO membership had been terminated, instead of leaving UMNO. She also denied defecting to other political party. On 9 March 2020, Ahmad Faizal announced that she had joined BERSATU. On 28 January 2024, she was appointed as Member of the Supreme Council of BERSATU by party president Muhyiddin Yassin alongside Padang Serai MP Azman Nasrudin and Taman Medan MLA Afif Bahardin.

== Election results ==
Parliament of Malaysia
Year	Constituency	Candidate	Votes	Pct	Opponent(s)	Votes	Pct	Ballots cast	Majority	Turnout
2022	P077 Tanjong Malim	Nolee Ashilin Mohammed Radzi (BERSATU)	21,599	31.00%	Chang Lih Kang (PKR)	25,140	36.08%	69,671	3,541	74.22%
2022	P077 Tanjong Malim	Nolee Ashilin Mohammed Radzi (BERSATU)	21,599	31.00%	Mah Hang Soon (MCA)	20,963	30.09%	69,671	3,541	74.22%
2022	P077 Tanjong Malim	Nolee Ashilin Mohammed Radzi (BERSATU)	21,599	31.00%	Jamaluddin Mohd Radzi (IND)	1,032	1.48%	69,671	3,541	74.22%
2022	P077 Tanjong Malim	Nolee Ashilin Mohammed Radzi (BERSATU)	21,599	31.00%	Amir Hamzah Abdul Rajak (IMAN)	609	0.87%	69,671	3,541	74.22%
2022	P077 Tanjong Malim	Nolee Ashilin Mohammed Radzi (BERSATU)	21,599	31.00%	Izzat Johari (IND)	328	0.47%	69,671	3,541	74.22%

Perak State Legislative Assembly
Year	Constituency	Candidate	Votes	Pct	Opponent(s)	Votes	Pct	Ballots cast	Majority	Turnout
2008	N43 Tualang Sekah	Nolee Ashilin Mohammed Radzi (UMNO)	6,366	57.03%	Nadarajah Manikam (PKR)	4,797	42.97%	11,578	1,579	69.53%
2013	N43 Tualang Sekah	Nolee Ashilin Mohammed Radzi (UMNO)	7,955	55.77%	Baldip Singh (PKR)	5,909	41.43%	12,430	2,046	77.37%
2013	N43 Tualang Sekah	Nolee Ashilin Mohammed Radzi (UMNO)	7,955	55.77%	Syed Mohammad Syed Ali (IND)	400	2.80%	12,430	2,046	77.37%
2018	N43 Tualang Sekah	Nolee Ashilin Mohammed Radzi (UMNO)	8,767	44.74%	Mohd Azlan Helmi (PKR)	7,668	39.12%	20,161	1,099	80.90%
2018	N43 Tualang Sekah	Nolee Ashilin Mohammed Radzi (UMNO)	8,767	44.74%	Mohd Sofian Rejab (PAS)	3,162	16.14%	20,161	1,099	80.90%

== Honours ==
=== Honours of Malaysia ===
- Malaysia
  - Medal of the Order of the Defender of the Realm (PPN) (2007)
- Perak
  - Knight Commander of the Order of Cura Si Manja Kini (DPCM) – Dato' (2014)
  - Meritorious Service Medal (PJK)
