= Loh Sze Yee =

Malaysian politician

Yang Berhormat Tuan Loh Sze Yee MLA
- 罗思义

Member of the Perak State Executive Council
- Incumbent
- Assumed office 22 November 2022
- Monarch: Nazrin Shah
- Menteri Besar: Saarani Mohamad
- Portfolio: Tourism, Industry, Investment & Corridor Development (Note: Assumed portfolios on 23 November 2022.)
- Preceded by: Shahrul Zaman Yahya (Industry, Investment & Corridor Development); Nolee Ashilin Mohamed Radzi (Tourism)
- Constituency: Jalong

Member of the Perak State Legislative Assembly for Jalong
- Incumbent
- Assumed office 5 May 2013
- Preceded by: Leong Mee Meng (PR–DAP)
- Majority: 6,769 (2013); 9,602 (2018); 8,713 (2022)

Personal details
- Born: Loh Sze Yee; 7 February 1975 (age 51) Ipoh, Perak, Malaysia
- Citizenship: Malaysian
- Party: Democratic Action Party (DAP)
- Other political affiliations: Pakatan Rakyat (PR) (2008–2015); Pakatan Harapan (PH) (since 2015)
- Spouse: Leong Pooi Wan
- Occupation: Politician

Loh Sze Yee

Chinese name
- Traditional Chinese: 羅思義
- Simplified Chinese: 罗思义
Transcriptions
Standard Mandarin
- Hanyu Pinyin: Luō Sīyì
Hakka
- Pha̍k-fa-sṳ: Lò Sî-ngi
Yue: Cantonese
- Jyutping: Lo4 Si1 Ji6
Southern Min
- Hokkien POJ: Lô Su-gī
- Tâi-lô: Lô Su-gī

Loh Sze Yee (born 7 February 1975) is a Malaysian politician who has served as Member of the Perak State Executive Council (EXCO) in the Barisan Nasional (BN) state administration under Menteri Besar Saarani Mohamad since November 2022 and Member of the Perak State Legislative Assembly (MLA) for Jalong since May 2013. He is a member of the Democratic Action Party (DAP), a component party of the Pakatan Harapan (PH) coalition.

== Personal life ==
His hobbies are swimming and jogging. He studied in SMK Anderson and is a Bachelor of Business Administration from Nottingham Trent University.

== Early career ==
He is also a businessman and Lecturer of Olympia College.

== Political career ==
He is the Member of Committee since 2013 and the Director of Political Education of DAP Perak. He is one of the members of Perak State Agricultural Development Corporation Board (PPPNP) from 2018 to 2019. He was elected to the Perak State Legislative Assembly for the seat of Jalong. He was reelected as the Jalong MLA in the 2018 and 2022 Perak state elections. On 22 November 2022, he was appointed the Perak EXCO in charge of tourism, industry, investment and corridor development.

== Election results ==
Perak State Legislative Assembly
Year	Constituency	Candidate	Votes	Pct	Opponent(s)	Votes	Pct	Ballots cast	Majority	Turnout
2013	N22 Jalong	Loh Sze Yee (DAP)	13,664	61.19%	Liew Yew Aw (Gerakan)	6,895	30.88%	22,330	6,769	79.30%
2013	N22 Jalong	Loh Sze Yee (DAP)	13,664	61.19%	Kalimuthu Sinnu (IND)	1,303	5.84%	22,330	6,769	79.30%
2018	N22 Jalong	Loh Sze Yee (DAP)	16,138	69.75%	Tan Lian Hoe (Gerakan)	6,536	28.25%	23,137	9,602	78.13%
2022	N22 Jalong	Loh Sze Yee (DAP)	15,955	59.08%	Pan Chean Chung (MCA)	7,242	26.82%	27,007	8,713	68.74%
2022	N22 Jalong	Loh Sze Yee (DAP)	15,955	59.08%	Naran Singh Asa Singh (Gerakan)	3,043	11.27%	27,007	8,713	68.74%
2022	N22 Jalong	Loh Sze Yee (DAP)	15,955	59.08%	R Indrani (IND)	767	2.84%	27,007	8,713	68.74%
