= Perak State Executive Council =

Executive branch of the Perak state government

- 2022–present
- Date formed: 21 November 2022

People and organisations
- Head of state: Sultan Nazrin Muizzudin Shah Al-Marhum Sultan Azlan Muhibbudin Shah Al-Maghfur-Lah
- Head of government: Saarani Mohammad (BN–UMNO)
- Total no. of members: 11
- Member parties: PH and BN coalition government: Pakatan Harapan (PH); Democratic Action Party (DAP); People's Justice Party (PKR); National Trust Party (AMANAH); Barisan Nasional (BN); United Malays National Organisation (UMNO); Malaysian Chinese Association (MCA)
- Status in legislature: Coalition government
- Opposition parties: Perikatan Nasional (PN); Malaysian United Indigenous Party (BERSATU); Malaysian Islamic Party (PAS)
- Opposition leader: Razman Zakaria (PN–PAS)

History
- Legislature term: 15th Malaysian Parliament
- Predecessor: Saarani I

The Perak State Executive Council is the executive authority of the Government of Perak, Malaysia. The council comprises the Menteri Besar, appointed by the Sultan on the basis that he is able to command a majority in the Perak State Legislative Assembly, a number of members made up of members of the Assembly, the state secretary, the state legal adviser and the state financial officer.

This council is similar in structure and role to the Cabinet of Malaysia, while being smaller in size. As federal and state responsibilities differ, there are a number of portfolios that differ between the federal and state governments.

Members of the council are selected by the Menteri Besar, appointed by the sultan. The council has no ministry, but instead a number of committees; each committee will take care of certain state affairs, activities and departments. Members of the council are always the chair of a committee.

== Ex-officio members ==
Portfolio	Name
State secretary	Ahmad Suaidi Abdul Rahim
State legal advisor	Azmir Shah Zainal Abidin
State financial officer	Mohd Zaki Mahyudin

== Lists of full members ==
=== Saarani II EXCO (since 2022) ===
PH (7)	BN (4)
DAP (4); PKR (2); AMANAH (1)	UMNO (4)

Members since 21 November 2022 have been :

Name	Portfolio (Note: Announced by Saarani on 23 November 2022, a day after the members took offices on 22 November 2022.)	Party	Constituency	Term start	Term end
Saarani Mohamad (Menteri Besar)	Islamic Religion; Finance; Security; Land; Natural Resources; Economic Planning; Government-Linked Companies	BN (UMNO)	Kota Tampan	21 November 2022	Incumbent
Senior Exco; Mohd Zolkafly Harun	Rural Development; Plantation; Agriculture; Food Industry	BN (UMNO)	Lintang	22 November 2022	Incumbent
Salbiah Mohamed	Women; Family; Social Welfare; Entrepreneur Development	BN (UMNO)	Temengor	22 November 2022	Incumbent
Khairudin Abu Hanipah	Education; Higher Education; Youth and Sports	BN (UMNO)	Belanja	22 November 2022	Incumbent
Teh Kok Lim	Science; Environment; Green Technology	PH (DAP)	Aulong	22 November 2022	Incumbent
Loh Sze Yee	Tourism; Industry; Investment; Corridor Development	PH (DAP)	Jalong	22 November 2022	Incumbent
Sivanesan Achalingam	Human Resources; Health; Indian Community Affairs	PH (DAP)	Sungkai	22 November 2022	Incumbent
Woo Kah Leong	Domestic Trade; Cooperatives; Consumer Affairs; Chinese New Villages	PH (DAP)	Pasir Bedamar	22 November 2022	Incumbent
Sandrea Ng Shy Ching	Housing; Local Government	PH (PKR)	Teja	22 November 2022	Incumbent
Mohd Azlan Helmi	Communication; Multimedia; Non-governmental Organisations	PH (PKR)	Tualang Sekah	22 November 2022	Incumbent
Mohammad Nizar Jamaluddin	Infrastructure; Energy; Water; Public Transport	PH (AMANAH)	Sungai Rapat	22 November 2022	Incumbent

== Former membership ==
=== Saarani I EXCO (2020–2022) ===
BN (6)	PN (5)
UMNO (6)	BERSATU (3); PAS (2)

Members from 10 December 2020 to 21 November 2022 were :

Name	Portfolio	Party	Constituency	Term start	Term end
Saarani Mohamad (Menteri Besar)	Islamic Religion; Finance; Security; Land; Natural Resources; Economic Planning; Government-Linked Companies	BN (UMNO)	Kota Tampan	10 December 2020	21 November 2022
Zainol Fadzi Paharudin	Rural Development; Entrepreneur Development and Cooperatives	PN (BERSATU)	Sungai Manik	10 December 2020	21 November 2022
Mohd Zolkafly Harun	Infrastructure; Energy; Water; Public Transportation	BN (UMNO)	Lintang	10 December 2020	21 November 2022
Shahrul Zaman Yahya	Industries; Investment; Corridors Development	BN (UMNO)	Rungkup	10 December 2020	21 November 2022
Wan Norashikin Wan Noordin	Women and Family Development; Social Welfare; Non-Governmental Organisation	BN (UMNO)	Kampong Gajah	10 December 2020	21 November 2022
Khairul Shahril Mohamed	Youth and Sports; Communications; Multimedia	BN (UMNO)	Bota	10 December 2020	21 November 2022
Ahmad Saidi Mohamad Daud	Education; Higher Education; Human Resource	BN (UMNO)	Changkat Jering	15 December 2020	21 November 2022
Abdul Yunus Jamahri	Domestic Trade and Consumerism; National Integration; Civil Society	PN (BERSATU)	Kuala Kurau	15 December 2020	21 November 2022
Nolee Ashilin Mohamed Radzi	Housing; Local Government; Tourism	PN (BERSATU)	Tualang Sekah	15 December 2020	21 November 2022
Razman Zakaria	Plantations; Agriculture; Food Industry	PN (PAS)	Gunong Semanggol	15 December 2020	21 November 2022
Mohd Akmal Kamaruddin	Health; Science; Environment; Green Technology	PN (PAS)	Selama	15 December 2020	21 November 2022

=== Ahmad Faizal II EXCO (2020) ===
BN (6)	PN (5)
UMNO (6)	BERSATU (3); PAS (2)

Members from 13 March 2020 to 5 December 2020 were :

Name	Portfolio	Party	Constituency	Term start	Term end
Ahmad Faizal Azumu (Menteri Besar)	Finance; Security; Land; Natural Resources; Economic Planning; Government-linked Companies (GLC); National Integrations	PN (BERSATU)	Chenderiang	13 March 2020	5 December 2020
Saarani Mohamad	Rural Development; Entrepreneur Development; Cooperative; Consumer Affairs	BN (UMNO)	Kota Tampan	13 March 2020	5 December 2020
Razman Zakaria	Education; Human Capital Development; Non-Governmental Organizations (NGO); Civil Community	PN (PAS)	Gunong Semanggol	13 March 2020	5 December 2020
Nolee Ashilin Mohammed Radzi	Housing; Local Government; Tourism	PN (BERSATU)	Tualang Sekah	13 March 2020	5 December 2020
Shahrul Zaman Yahya	Industry; Investment; Corridor Development	BN (UMNO)	Runkup	13 March 2020	5 December 2020
Abdul Yunus Jamahri	Agriculture; Fishery; Plantation; Food Security	PN (BERSATU)	Kuala Kurau	13 March 2020	5 December 2020
Mohd Akmal Kamaruddin	Islamic Religious; Information	PN (PAS)	Selama	13 March 2020	5 December 2020
Wan Norashikin Wan Noordin	Women Development; Family; Community Welfare	BN (UMNO)	Kampong Gajah	13 March 2020	5 December 2020
Mohd Zolkafly Harun	Infrastructure; Energy; Water; Public Transportation	BN (UMNO)	Lintang	12 May 2020	5 December 2020
Ahmad Saidi Mohamad Daud	Health; Science; Environment; Green Technology	BN (UMNO)	Changkat Jering	12 May 2020	5 December 2020
Khairul Shahril Mohamed	Youth; Sports; Communication; Multimedia	BN (UMNO)	Bota	12 May 2020	5 December 2020

=== Ahmad Faizal I EXCO (2018–2020) ===
PH (11)
- DAP (5)
- AMANAH (3)
- BERSATU (1)
- PKR (2)

Members from 12 May 2018 to 10 March 2020 were :

Name	Portfolio	Party	Constituency	Term start	Term end
Ahmad Faizal Azumu (Menteri Besar)	Finance; Security; Land; Government-linked Companies; Natural Resources; Economic Planning	BERSATU	Chenderiang	12 May 2018	10 March 2020
Mohammad Nizar Jamaluddin	Investment; Corridor Development	AMANAH	Sungai Rapat	19 May 2018	10 March 2020
Abdul Aziz Bari	Education; Environment; Green Technology; Information	DAP	Tebing Tinggi	19 May 2018	10 March 2020
Asmuni Awi	Islamic Affairs and Education; Industry; Rural Affairs; Entrepreneurial Development	AMANAH	Manjoi	19 May 2018	10 March 2020
Abdul Yunus Jamahri	Public Facilities; Infrastructure; Agriculture; Plantation	PKR	Kuala Kurau	19 May 2018	10 March 2020
Tan Kar Hing	Tourism; Culture and Art	PKR	Simpang Pulai	19 May 2018	10 March 2020
Lee Chuan How	Youth and Sports; Human Capital Development	DAP	Pasir Pinji	19 May 2018	10 March 2020
Hasnul Zulkarnain Abdul Munaim	Communication and Multimedia; Non-governmental Organisations; Cooperative Development	AMANAH	Titi Serong	19 May 2018	10 March 2020
Sivanesan Achalingam	Health; Consumer Affairs; Civil Community; National Integration; Human Resources	DAP	Sungkai	19 May 2018	10 March 2020
Paul Yong Choo Kiong	Housing and Local Government; Public Transport; Non-Muslim Affairs; New Villages	DAP	Tronoh	19 May 2018	24 August 2019 (Note: Vacant from 24 August 2019 to 15 November 2019 for 84 days as duties and powers were suspended due to his rape allegation, trial and case.)
Paul Yong Choo Kiong	Housing and Local Government; Public Transport; Non-Muslim Affairs; New Villages	DAP	Tronoh	15 November 2019 (Note: Resumed the duties and powers on 15 November 2019 after the discussion and consent of the Menteri Besar Ahmad Faizal Azumu.)	10 March 2020
Wong May Ing	Development of Attitude; Women and Family Development; Community Welfare	DAP	Pantai Remis	19 May 2018	10 March 2020

=== Zambry II EXCO (2013–2018) ===
BN (11)
- UMNO (10)
- MCA (1)

Name	Portfolio	Party	Constituency	Term start	Term end
Zambry Abdul Kadir (Menteri Besar)	Economic Planning; Finance; Security; Land; Natural Resources; Agriculture; Islamic Affairs	UMNO	Pangkor	2013	12 May 2018
Saarani Mohamad	Rural Development; Plantations; Agriculture; Housing (2013–2014); Local Government (2013–2014); Information (2014–2018); Human Capital Development (2014–2018)	UMNO	Kota Tampan	19 May 2013	12 May 2018
Mohamad Zahir Abdul Khalid	Industry; Investment and Corridor Development	UMNO	Kamunting	19 May 2013	12 May 2018
Zainol Fadzi Paharudin	Public Utilities; Infrastructure; Energy and Water	UMNO	Sungai Manik	19 May 2013	12 May 2018
Rusnah Kassim	Women; Family; Social Welfare; National Integration	UMNO	Behrang	19 May 2013	12 May 2018
Samsudin Abu Hassan	Consumer Affairs (2013–2014); Human Resources (2013–2014); Non-governmental Organisations; Civil Community; Entrepreneur Development (2014-2018); Co-operatives (2014-2018)	UMNO	Ayer Kuning	19 May 2013	12 May 2018
Mohd Nizar Zakaria	Islamic Education (2013–2014); Islamic Affairs (2014–2018); Education (2014–2018); Attitude Development; Co-operatives (2013–2014); Entrepreneur Development (2013–2014)	UMNO	Belanja	19 May 2013	12 May 2018
Muhammad Amin Zakaria	Education; Science; Environment and Green Technology	UMNO	Batu Kurau	19 May 2013	12 May 2018
Nolee Ashilin Mohammed Radzi	Health (2013–2014); Tourism; Art (2014–2018); Culture; Communication (2014–2018); Multimedia (2014–2018)	UMNO	Tualang Sekah	19 May 2013	12 May 2018
Shahrul Zaman Yahya	Human Resources (2014–2018); Youth and Sports; Communication (2013–2014); Multimedia (2013–2014)	UMNO	Rungkup	19 May 2013	12 May 2018
Mah Hang Soon	Health; Public Transport; Non-Muslim Affairs; National Integration; New Villages	MCA	Chenderiang	2014	12 May 2018

=== Zambry I EXCO (2009–2013) ===
BN (7)
- UMNO (6)
- MCA (1)

Name	Portfolio	Party	Constituency	Term start	Term end
Zambry Abdul Kadir (Menteri Besar)	Economic Planning; Finance; Security; Land; Natural Resources; Agriculture; Islamic Affairs	UMNO	Pangkor	6 February 2009 (sworn in) 12 May 2009	2013
Hamidah Osman	Industry; Investment; Entrepreneur Development; Communications; Tourism; Women	UMNO	Sungai Rapat	11 February 2009	2013
Ramly Zahari	Infrastructure; Energy; Water	UMNO	Manong	11 February 2009	2013
Mah Hang Soon	Health; Local Government; Consumer Affairs; Environment; Transportation; Non-Muslim Affairs	MCA	Chenderiang	11 February 2009	2013
Saarani Mohamad	Rural Development; Poverty Eradication; Plantations and Welfare	UMNO	Kota Tampan	11 February 2009	2013
Mohamad Zahir Abdul Khalid	Education; Higher Education; Science and Technology	UMNO	Kamunting	11 February 2009	2013
Zainol Fadzi Paharudin	Art; Culture; Youth and Sports	UMNO	Sungai Manik	11 February 2009	2013

=== Nizar EXCO (2008–2009) ===
DAP (6) PKR (3) PAS (2)

Name	Portfolio	Party	Constituency	Term start	Term end
Mohammad Nizar Jamaluddin (Menteri Besar)	Finance; Economic Development; Land; Earth Products; Natural Resources; Security; Rural Development	PAS	Pasir Panjang	17 March 2008	12 May 2009
Ngeh Koo Ham (Senior Exco)	Infrastructure & Public Facilities; Energy & Water; Non-Muslim Affairs	DAP	Sitiawan	28 March 2008	10 May 2009
Nga Kor Ming	Education; Local Government; Housing; Public Transport	DAP	Pantai Remis	28 March 2008	10 May 2009
Sivanesan Achalingam	Health; Environment; Human Resources	DAP	Sungkai	28 March 2008	10 May 2009
Seah Leong Peng	Culture; Youth and Sports	DAP	Pasir Bedamar	28 March 2008	10 May 2009
Chen Fook Chye	Consumer Affairs; Civil Community; National Integration	DAP	Keranji	28 March 2008	10 May 2009
Su Keong Siong	Higher Education; Science; Technology & Communications	DAP	Pasir Pinji	28 March 2008	10 May 2009
Jamaluddin Mohd Radzi	Entrepreneur Development; Agriculture; Domestic Trade	PKR	Behrang	28 March 2008	10 May 2009
Tai Sing Ng	Industry Development; Information	PKR	Kuala Sepetang	28 March 2008	10 May 2009
Mohd Osman Mohd Jailu	Tourism; Human Capital Development; Non-Governmental Organizations (NGO)	PKR	Changkat Jering	28 March 2008	10 May 2009
Mohd Zainuddin Mohd Yusof	Islamic Affairs and Education; Women; Community Welfare	PAS	Lubok Merbau	28 March 2008	10 May 2009

=== Tajol Rosli II EXCO (2004–2008) ===
UMNO (6) MCA (3) MIC (2)

Members from 2004 to 2008 were :

Name	Portfolio	Party	Constituency	Term start	Term end
Tajol Rosli Mohd Ghazali (Menteri Besar)		UMNO	Pengkalan Hulu	2004	2008
Mohd Radzi Manan	Agriculture and Agro-based Industry; Tourism	UMNO	Tualang Sekah	2004	2008
Zambry Abdul Kadir	Education; Human Resources (2004–2006); Multimedia (2004–2006); Higher Education (2006–2008); Science and Technology (2006–2008)	UMNO	Pangkor	31 March 2004	2008
Saarani Mohamad	Information (2006–2008); Rural Development; Plantation Industries (2006–2008); Commodities (2006–2008)	UMNO	Kota Tampan	2004	2008
Siti Salmah Mat Jusak	Women Affairs; Family; Community Development	UMNO	Chenderoh	2004	2008
Mohd Zaim Abu Hassan	Information (2004–2006); Youth and Sports; Culture; Arts; Heritage	UMNO	Belanja	2004	2008
Ramly Zahari	Industry; Entrepreneur Development	UMNO	Manong	2004	2008
Ho Cheng Wang	Infrastructure; Public Utilities	MCA	Pokok Assam	2004	2008
Tan Chin Meng	Health; Science; Environment	MCA	Kepayang	2004	2008
Chang Ko Youn	Urban; Local Government	Gerakan	Jalong	2004	2008
Rajoo Govindasamy	Consumer Affairs; Unity	MIC	Hutan Melintang	2004	2008

=== Tajol Rosli I EXCO (1999–2004) ===
UMNO (6) MCA (3) MIC (2)

Members from 1999 to 2004 were :

Name	Portfolio	Party	Constituency	Term start	Term end
Tajol Rosli Mohd Ghazali (Menteri Besar)	Development and Economic Planning; Finance; Privatization; Security; Housing; Land Development	UMNO	Kenering	1999	2004
Jamal Nasir Rasdi	Human Capital Development; Youth and Sports	UMNO	Lubok Merbau	1999	2004
Mazidah Zakaria	Culture; Tourism; Women Affairs	UMNO	Hulu Kinta	1999	2004
Abdul Malek Md Hanafiah	Islam; Education	UMNO	Kamunting	1999	2004
Ramly Zahari	Industrial Development; Entrepreneur Development; Information	UMNO	Manong	1999	2004
Ainon Khariyah Mohd Abas	Rural Development; Community Development	UMNO	Kampong Gajah	1999	2004
Azman Mahalan	Agriculture	UMNO	Ayer Kuning	1999	2004
Ong Ka Chuan	Infrastructure; Public Facilities	MCA	Chenderiang	1999	2004
Ho Cheng Wang	New Village Affairs; Health; Science; Technology; Environment	MCA	Pokok Assam	1999	2004
Chang Ko Youn	Municipalities; Local Government	Gerakan	Jalong	1999	2004
Rajoo Govindasamy	Unity; Consumer Affairs	MIC	Hutan Melintang	1999	2004

== See also ==
- Sultan of Perak
- List of Menteris Besar of Perak
- Perak State Legislative Assembly
