= Tualang Sekah =

Political subdivision in Malaysia

Tualang Sekah (N43)
Perak constituency

State constituency
- Legislature: Perak State Legislative Assembly
MLA
Mohd Azlan Helmi
PH
- Constituency created: 1994
- First contested: 1995
- Last contested: 2022

Demographics
- Electors (2022): 31,945

Tualang Sekah is a state constituency in Perak, Malaysia, that has been represented in the Perak State Legislative Assembly. It has been represented by Member of the Perak State Executive Council (EXCO) Mohd Azlan Helmi of Pakatan Harapan (PH) since 2022.

== Demographics ==
Ethnic breakdown of Tualang Sekah's electorate as of 2022
1. Malay (62.0%)
2. Chinese (24.2%)
3. Indian (9.15%)
4. Other ethnicities (4.68%)

== History ==
=== Polling districts ===
According to the federal gazette issued on 31 October 2022, the Tualang Sekah constituency is divided into 19 polling districts.

| State constituency | Polling Districts | Code | Location |
|---|---|---|---|
| Tualang Sekah（N43） | Ayer Denak | 070/43/01 | SK Ayer Denak |
| Tualang Sekah（N43） | Kampong Batu Tujoh | 070/43/02 | SK Tanjung Tualang |
| Tualang Sekah（N43） | Ladang Lembah Kinta | 070/43/03 | SJK (T) Ladang Kinta Valley |
| Tualang Sekah（N43） | Kampong Chenderong | 070/43/04 | SJK (C) Thung Hon |
| Tualang Sekah（N43） | Kampong Ayer Mati | 070/43/05 | SK Bakap |
| Tualang Sekah（N43） | Changkat Tualang | 070/43/06 | SK Changkat Tualang |
| Tualang Sekah（N43） | Ladang Kinta Kellas | 070/43/07 | Macer Hall |
| Tualang Sekah（N43） | Ladang Kota Bharu | 070/43/08 | SJK (T) Ladang Kota Bahroe |
| Tualang Sekah（N43） | Kota Bharu | 070/43/09 | SK Kota Baharu |
| Tualang Sekah（N43） | Changkat Bharu | 070/43/10 | SK Malim Nawar |
| Tualang Sekah（N43） | Tualang Sekah | 070/43/11 | SK Tualang Sekah |
| Tualang Sekah（N43） | Kuala Dipang | 070/43/12 | SK Kuala Dipang |
| Tualang Sekah（N43） | Jeram Selatan | 070/43/13 | SJK (C) Jeram |
| Tualang Sekah（N43） | Jeram Timor | 070/43/14 | SJK (C) Jeram |
| Tualang Sekah（N43） | Jeram Barat | 070/43/15 | SJK (C) Jeram |
| Tualang Sekah（N43） | Kampong Pisang | 070/43/16 | SJK (C) Jeram |
| Tualang Sekah（N43） | Gunong Mesah | 070/43/17 | SK Gunung Panjang; Dewan Komuniti, Kampung Tersusun Batu 3 ½. |
| Tualang Sekah（N43） | Sungai Siput Selatan | 070/43/18 | SJK (C) Sin Min |
| Tualang Sekah（N43） | Kampong Sahum | 070/43/19 | SK Sahom |

=== Representation history ===
Members of the Legislative Assembly for Tualang Sekah
| Assembly | No | Years | Name | Party |
Constituency created from Chenderong and Malim Nawar
| 9th | N37 | 1995-1999 | Mohammed Radzi Manan | BN (UMNO) |
| 10th | N37 | 1999-2004 | Mohammed Radzi Manan | BN (UMNO) |
| 11th | N42 | 2004-2008 | Mohammed Radzi Manan | BN (UMNO) |
| 12th | N42 | 2008-2013 | Nolee Ashilin Mohammed Radzi | BN (UMNO) |
| 13th | N42 | 2013-2018 | Nolee Ashilin Mohammed Radzi | BN (UMNO) |
| 14th | N43 | 2018 | Nolee Ashilin Mohammed Radzi | BN (UMNO) |
| 14th | N43 | 2018-2020 | Nolee Ashilin Mohammed Radzi | PH (BERSATU) |
| 14th | N43 | 2020-2022 | Nolee Ashilin Mohammed Radzi | PN (BERSATU) |
| 15th | N43 | 2022–present | Mohd Azlan Helmi | PH (PKR) |

== Election results ==
Perak state election, 2022: Tualang Sekah
| Party | Candidate | Votes | % | ∆% |
|---|---|---|---|---|
| PH | Mohd Azlan Helmi | 8,025 | 34.41 | ▲34.41 |
| PN | Pazli Abdullah Sani | 7,772 | 33.33 | ▲33.33 |
| BN | Abd Rahman Md Som | 7,524 | 32.26 | ▼12.48 |
| Total valid votes | | 23,321 | 100.00 | |
| Total rejected ballots | | 289 | | |
| Unreturned ballots | | 56 | | |
| Turnout | | 23,666 | 74.08 | ▼6.85 |
| Registered electors | | 31,945 | | |
| Majority | | 253 | 1.08 | ▼4.53 |
| PH gain from BN | | Swing | | ? |

Perak state election, 2018: Tualang Sekah
| Party | Candidate | Votes | % | ∆% |
|---|---|---|---|---|
| BN | Nolee Ashilin Mohammed Radzi | 8,767 | 44.74 | ▼11.03 |
| PKR | Mohd Azlan Helmi | 7,668 | 39.13 | ▼3.00 |
| PAS | Mohd Sofian Rejab | 3,162 | 16.14 | ▲16.14 |
| Total valid votes | | 19,597 | 97.20 | |
| Total rejected ballots | | 449 | 2.23 | |
| Unreturned ballots | | 115 | 0.57 | |
| Turnout | | 20,161 | 80.93 | ▼1.07 |
| Registered electors | | 24,913 | | |
| Majority | | 1,099 | 5.61 | ▼8.73 |
| BN hold | | Swing | | |
Source(s) "RESULTS OF CONTESTED ELECTION AND STATEMENTS OF THE POLL AFTER THE OFFICIAL ADDITION OF VOTES".

Perak state election, 2013: Tualang Sekah
| Party | Candidate | Votes | % | ∆% |
|---|---|---|---|---|
| BN | Nolee Ashilin Mohammed Radzi | 7,955 | 55.77 | ▼1.26 |
| PKR | Baldip Singh Santokh Singh | 5,909 | 41.43 | ▼1.54 |
| Independent | Syed Mohamed Syed Ali | 400 | 2.80 | ▲2.80 |
| Total valid votes | | 14,264 | 97.33 | |
| Total rejected ballots | | 347 | 2.37 | |
| Unreturned ballots | | 54 | 0.37 | |
| Turnout | | 14,665 | 82.00 | ▲12.47 |
| Registered electors | | 17,893 | | |
| Majority | | 2,046 | 14.34 | ▲0.28 |
| BN hold | | Swing | | |
Source(s) "KEPUTUSAN PILIHAN RAYA UMUM DEWAN UNDANGAN NEGERI".

Perak state election, 2008: Tualang Sekah
| Party | Candidate | Votes | % | ∆% |
|---|---|---|---|---|
| BN | Nolee Ashilin Mohammed Radzi | 6,366 | 57.03 | ▼7.82 |
| PKR | Nadarajah Manikam | 4,797 | 42.97 | ▲7.82 |
| Total valid votes | | 11,163 | 96.42 | |
| Total rejected ballots | | 361 | 3.12 | |
| Unreturned ballots | | 54 | 0.47 | |
| Turnout | | 11,578 | 69.53 | ▲1.20 |
| Registered electors | | 16,651 | | |
| Majority | | 1,569 | 14.06 | ▼15.64 |
| BN hold | | Swing | | |
Source(s) "KEPUTUSAN PILIHAN RAYA UMUM DEWAN UNDANGAN NEGERI PERAK BAGI TAHUN 2008".

Perak state election, 2004: Tualang Sekah
| Party | Candidate | Votes | % | ∆% |
|---|---|---|---|---|
| BN | Mohammed Radzi Manan | 7,230 | 64.85 | ▲5.67 |
| PKR | Salma Ismail | 3,919 | 35.15 | ▼5.67 |
| Total valid votes | | 11,149 | 96.63 | |
| Total rejected ballots | | 351 | 3.04 | |
| Unreturned ballots | | 38 | 0.33 | |
| Turnout | | 11,538 | 68.33 | ▲5.08 |
| Registered electors | | 16,886 | | |
| Majority | | 3,311 | 29.70 | ▲11.34 |
| BN hold | | Swing | | |
Source(s) "KEPUTUSAN PILIHAN RAYA UMUM DEWAN UNDANGAN NEGERI PERAK BAGI TAHUN 2004".

Perak state election, 1999: Tualang Sekah
| Party | Candidate | Votes | % | ∆% |
|---|---|---|---|---|
| BN | Mohammed Radzi Manan | 6,352 | 59.18 | ▼17.94 |
| PKR | Hanafiah Man | 4,382 | 40.82 | ▲40.82 |
| Total valid votes | | 10,734 | 96.65 | |
| Total rejected ballots | | 353 | 3.18 | |
| Unreturned ballots | | 30 | 0.27 | |
| Turnout | | 11,117 | 63.25 | ▼2.14 |
| Registered electors | | 17,575 | | |
| Majority | | 1,970 | 18.36 | ▼40.25 |
| BN hold | | Swing | | |
Source(s) "KEPUTUSAN PILIHAN RAYA UMUM DEWAN UNDANGAN NEGERI PERAK BAGI TAHUN 1999".

Perak state election, 1995: Tualang Sekah
| Party | Candidate | Votes | % |
|---|---|---|---|
| BN | Mohammed Radzi Manan | 8,693 | 77.12 |
| PAS | Khusaini Mohd Ludin | 2,086 | 18.51 |
| Total valid votes | | 10,779 | 95.63 |
| Total rejected ballots | | 467 | 4.14 |
| Unreturned ballots | | 26 | 0.23 |
| Turnout | | 11,272 | 65.39 |
| Registered electors | | 17,237 | |
| Majority | | 6,607 | 58.61 |
This was a new constituency created.
Source(s) "KEPUTUSAN PILIHAN RAYA UMUM DEWAN UNDANGAN NEGERI PERAK BAGI TAHUN 1995".
