= Hamidah Osman =

Malaysian politician

Yang Berbahagia Dato' Hamidah Osman DPCM KMN

Vice President of the Parti Bumiputera Perkasa Malaysia
- In office 8 May 2019 – 10 August 2022 Serving with: Hassan Basri Muhammad; Mohd Khairul Azam Abdul Aziz
- President: Ibrahim Ali
- Preceded by: post established

Vice President of the Malaysian United Indigenous Party
- In office 3 November 2016 – 16 September 2017 Serving with: Ab Rashid Ab Rahman; Abdul Rashid Asari
- President: Muhyiddin Yassin
- Succeeded by: Mohd Rafiq Naizamohideen

Member of the Perak State Executive Council
- In office 11 February 2009 – 2013 (Industry, Investment, Entrepreneur Development, Communications, Tourism and Women Affairs)
- Monarch: Azlan Shah
- Menteri Besar: Zambry Abdul Kadir

Member of the Perak State Legislative Assembly for Sungai Rapat
- In office 2004 – 5 May 2013
- Preceded by: constituency established
- Succeeded by: Radzi Zainon (PR–PAS)

Personal details
- Party: United Malays National Organisation (UMNO) (–2015); Malaysian United Indigenous Party (BERSATU) (2016–2017); Parti Bumiputera Perkasa Malaysia (PUTRA) (2018–2022); Independent (IND) (2022–2026); Malaysian Islamic Party (PAS) (since 2026)
- Other political affiliations: Barisan Nasional (BN) (–2015); Pakatan Harapan (PH) (2016–2017); Perikatan Nasional (PN) (since 2026)

Hamidah binti Osman is a Malaysian politician who served as Member of the Perak State Legislative Assembly for Sungai Rapat from 2004 to May 2013 and State EXCO from 2009 to 2019.

== Politics ==
Hamida is the former women's wing chairperson of UMNO Division of Gopeng and served as a senior executive councilor in Perak. However, she was expelled from UMNO in 2015 for publicly criticizing party chairman Dato' Sri Najib Razak. In 2016, she joined the Malaysian United Indigenous Party founded by former Prime Minister Mahathir Mohamad as vice chairman until she quit the party at the end of September 2017. On 10 August 2022, Hamidah, who is the vice chairman of the Parti Bumiputera Perkasa Malaysia, was dissatisfied with the party's joining the Gerakan Tanah Air established by Mahathir, chairman of the Homeland Fighter's Party, so she announced his resignation from all party positions and quit the party.

== Controversy ==
In the Perak State Legislative Assembly, Hamidah has raised racial issues when comparing the credibility of Indians to snakes. MP of Ipoh Timor, Lim Kit Siang asked the Perak Barisan Nasional chairman, Dato' Seri Mohd Tajol Rosli Mohd Ghazali to apologize for Hamidah Osman's outburst. In an incident on 27 June 2008, Hamidah asked Speaker Sivakumar Varatharaju whether he agreed or not with the analogy.

== Election results ==
Perak State Legislative Assembly
Year	Constituency	Candidate	Votes	Pct	Opponent(s)	Votes	Pct	Ballots cast	Majority	Turnout
2004	N43 Sungai Rapat	Hamidah Osman (UMNO)	11,881	65.90%	Roslan Shaharum (PAS)	5,612	31.13%	18,502	6,269	71.82%
2004	N43 Sungai Rapat	Hamidah Osman (UMNO)	11,881	65.90%	Balakrishnan Rengasamy (IND)	536	2.97%	18,502	6,269	71.82%
2008	N43 Sungai Rapat	Hamidah Osman (UMNO)	10,635	51.54%	Radzi Zainon (PAS)	9,999	48.59%	21,040	636	72.98%
2013	N43 Sungai Rapat	Hamidah Osman (UMNO)	16,602	45.89%	Radzi Zainon (PAS)	19,240	53.19%	36,741	2,638	85.70%

== Honours ==
- Malaysia
  - Officer of the Order of the Defender of the Realm (KMN) (2005)
- Perak
  - Knight Commander of the Order of Cura Si Manja Kini (DPCM) – Dato' (2009)
