= Mohd Azlan Helmi =

Malaysian politician, entrepreneur and assistant engineer

Yang Berhormat Tuan Mohd Azlan Helmi MLA
- محمّد أزلان حلمي

Member of the Perak State Executive Council
- Incumbent
- Assumed office 22 November 2022
- Monarch: Nazrin Shah
- Menteri Besar: Saarani Mohamad
- Portfolio: Communication, Multimedia & Non-governmental Organisations (Note: Assumed portfolios on 23 November 2022 taking office.)
- Preceded by: Khairul Shahril Mohamed (Communication & Multimedia); Wan Norashikin Wan Noordin (Non-governmental Organisations)
- Constituency: Tualang Sekah

State Deputy Chairman of the People's Justice Party of Perak
- Incumbent
- Assumed office 15 September 2024
- President: Anwar Ibrahim
- State Chairman: Mohamad Hairul Amir Sabri
- Preceded by: Mohamad Hairul Amir Sabri

Member of the Perak State Legislative Assembly for Tualang Sekah
- Incumbent
- Assumed office 19 November 2022
- Preceded by: Nolee Ashilin Mohammed Radzi (BN–UMNO)
- Majority: 253 (2022)

Personal details
- Born: Mohd Azlan bin Helmi; 1980 (age 45–46) Malaysia
- Citizenship: Malaysian
- Party: People's Justice Party (PKR)
- Other political affiliations: Pakatan Rakyat (PR) (2008–2015); Pakatan Harapan (PH) (since 2015)
- Education: Perak Institute of Technology
- Occupation: Politician; Entrepreneur
- Profession: Assistant Engineer

Mohd Azlan bin Helmi (born 1980) is a Malaysian politician, entrepreneur and assistant engineer who has served as Member of the Perak State Executive Council (EXCO) in the Barisan Nasional (BN) state administration under Menteri Besar Saarani Mohamad and Member of the Perak State Legislative Assembly (MLA) for Tualang Sekah since November 2022. He is a member of the People's Justice Party (PKR), a component party of the Pakatan Harapan (PH) and formerly Pakatan Rakyat (PR) coalitions. He has also served as the State Deputy Chairman of PKR of Perak since September 2024, State Secretary of PKR of Perak and Political Secretary to the Member of Parliament (MP) for Kampar since 2018. He served as the Coordinator of the Tualang Sekah state seat in 2017, State Deputy Youth Chief of PH of Perak in 2017, State Youth Chief of PKR of Perak from 2014 to 2018, Division Youth Chief of PKR of Kampar in 2014, Division Committee Member of PKR of Kampar in 2010, Division Polling and Counting Agent (PACA) of Kampar from 2009 to 2013, Member of the Youth Secretariat of PR of Perak from 2009 to 2013, Division Vice Chief of PKR of Kampar in 2009 and Branch Chief of Batu Karang in 2008.

== Political career ==
=== Candidate for the Member of the Perak State Legislative Assembly (2018) ===
==== 2018 Perak state election ====
In the 2018 Perak state election, Mohd Azlan made his electoral debut after being nominated by PH to contest the Tualang Sekah state seat. He was not elected to the Perak Assembly as the Tualang Sekah MLA after losing to Nolee Ashilin Mohammed Radzi of Barisan Nasional (BN) by a minority of 1,009 votes.

=== Member of the Perak State Legislative Assembly (since 2022) ===
==== 2022 Perak state election ====
In the 2022 Perak state election, Mohd Azlan was renominated by BN to contest the Tualang Sekah seat again. He won the seat and was elected to the Perak Assembly as the Tualang Sekah MLA for the first term after narrowly defeating Pazli Abdullah Sani of Perikatan Nasional (PN) and Abd Rahman Md Som of BN by a majority of only 253 votes.

=== Member of the Perak State Executive Council (since 2022) ===
On 22 November 2022, Saarani of BN was reappointed the Menteri Besar and the state coalition government of BN and PH was formed. Mohd Azlan of PH was appointed the Perak EXCO Member by Menteri Besar Saarani on the same day. The following day on 23 November 2022, he was assigned the portfolios of Communication, Multimedia and Non-governmental Organisations (NGO).

== Election results ==
Perak State Legislative Assembly
Year	Constituency	Candidate	Votes	Pct	Opponent(s)	Votes	Pct	Ballots cast	Majority	Turnout
2018	N43 Tualang Sekah	Mohd Azlan Helmi (PKR)	7,668	39.13%	Nolee Ashilin Mohammed Radzi (UMNO)	8,767	44.74%	19,597	1,009	78.66%
2018	N43 Tualang Sekah	Mohd Azlan Helmi (PKR)	7,668	39.13%	Mohd Sofian Rejab (PAS)	3,162	16.14%	19,597	1,009	78.66%
2022	N43 Tualang Sekah	Mohd Azlan Helmi (PKR)	8,025	34.41%	Pazli Abdullah Sani (BERSATU)	7,772	33.33%	23,321	253	73.00%
2022	N43 Tualang Sekah	Mohd Azlan Helmi (PKR)	8,025	34.41%	Abd Rahman Md Som (UMNO)	7,524	32.26%	23,321	253	73.00%
