= Jalong =

State constituency in Perak, Malaysia

Jalong (N22)
Perak constituency

State constituency
- Legislature: Perak State Legislative Assembly
MLA
Loh Sze Yee
PH
- Constituency created: 1959
- First contested: 1959
- Last contested: 2022

Demographics
- Electors (2022): 39,288

Jalong is a state constituency in Perak, Malaysia, that has been represented in the Perak State Legislative Assembly.

This constituency mandated to return a single member to the Perak State Legislative Assembly under the first past the post voting system.

== Demographics ==
Ethnic breakdown of Jalong's electorate as of 2022
1. Chinese (50.1%)
2. Indian (28.4%)
3. Malay (16.8%)
4. Other ethnicities (4.79%)

== History ==
=== Polling districts ===
According to the gazette issued on 31 October 2022, the Jalong constituency has a total of 12 polling districts.

State constituency	Polling Districts	Code	Location
Jalong（N22）	Jalong Timor	062/22/01	SK Jalong
Jalong（N22）	Jalong Barat	062/22/02	SJK(C) Simpang Jalong
Jalong（N22）	Jalan Lintang	062/22/03	SK Kampung Muhibbah
Jalong（N22）	Lintang Road Barat	062/22/04	SJK(T) Mahathma Gandhi Kalasalai
Jalong（N22）	Kampong Bahagia	062/22/05	SMK Methodist; SRA Rakyat Ijtihadiah
Jalong（N22）	Rimba Panjang Utara	062/22/06	SJK(C) Rimba Panjang
Jalong（N22）	Kampong Muhibbah	062/22/07	SMK Toh Muda Abdul Aziz Sungai Siput (U)
Jalong（N22）	Simpang Tiga	062/22/08	SMJK Shing Chung
Jalong（N22）	Main Road	062/22/09	SK Sungai Siput (U)
Jalong（N22）	Mahkamah	062/22/10	SJK(C) Sungai Buloh
Jalong（N22）	Sungai Buloh Selatan	062/22/11	SJK(C) Sungai Buloh
Jalong（N22）	Sungai Pelang	062/22/12	SJK(T) Ladang Dovenby

=== Representation history ===
Members of the Legislative Assembly for Jalong
Assembly	No	Years	Name	Party
Constituency created
1st	N16	1959-1964	See Khon Lim (施坤林)	Alliance (MCA)
2nd	N16	1964-1969	See Khon Lim (施坤林)	Alliance (MCA)
		1969-1971	Assembly dissolved	
3rd	N16	1971-1973	R. C. Mahadeva Rayan	PPP
3rd	N16	1973-1974	R. C. Mahadeva Rayan	BN (PPP)
4th	N10	1974-1978	Ngan Siong Hing @ Ngan Siong Eng (颜祥兴)	DAP
5th	N10	1978-1982	Lim Keng Yaik (林敬益)	BN (GERAKAN)
6th	N10	1982-1986	Lim Keng Yaik (林敬益)	BN (GERAKAN)
7th	N16	1986-1990	Liew Sam Fong (刘三丰)	DAP
8th	N16	1990-1995	Ngoi Thiam Woh (魏添风)	DAP
9th	N19	1995-1999	Chang Ko Youn (郑可扬)	BN (GERAKAN)
10th	N19	1999-2004	Chang Ko Youn (郑可扬)	BN (GERAKAN)
11th	N22	2004-2008	Chang Ko Youn (郑可扬)	BN (GERAKAN)
12th	N22	2008-2013	Leong Mee Meng (梁美明)	PR (DAP)
13th	N22	2013-2018	Loh Sze Yee (罗思義)	PR (DAP)
14th	N22	2018-2022	Loh Sze Yee (罗思義)	PH (DAP)
15th	N22	2022–present	Loh Sze Yee (罗思義)	PH (DAP)

== Election results ==
Perak state election, 2022: Jalong
Party	Candidate	Votes	%	∆%
PH	Loh Sze Yee	15,955	59.08	▲59.08
BN	Pan Chean Chang	7,242	26.82	▼2.00
PN	Naran Singh	3,043	11.27	▲11.27
Independent	Indrani	767	2.84	▲2.84
Total valid votes		27,391	100.00	
Total rejected ballots		338		
Unreturned ballots		46		
Turnout		27,775	69.72	▼8.41
Registered electors		39,288		
Majority		8,713	32.26	▼10.09
PH hold		Swing		

Perak state election, 2018: Jalong
Party	Candidate	Votes	%	∆%
PKR	Loh Sze Yee	16,138	71.17	▲71.17
BN	Tan Lian Hoe	6,536	28.82	▲2.72
Total valid votes		22,674	98.00	
Total rejected ballots		400	1.73	
Unreturned ballots		63	0.27	
Turnout		23,137	78.13	▼1.17
Registered electors		29,613		
Majority		9,602	42.35	▲11.39
PKR hold		Swing		
Source(s) "RESULTS OF CONTESTED ELECTION AND STATEMENTS OF THE POLL AFTER THE OFFICIAL ADDITION OF VOTES". Archived from the original on 2023-04-28.

Perak state election, 2013: Jalong
Party	Candidate	Votes	%	∆%
DAP	Loh Sze Yee	13,664	62.50	▼3.09
BN	Liew Yew Aw	6,895	31.54	▼2.87
Independent	Kalimuthu A/L Sinnu	1,303	5.96	▲5.96
Total valid votes		21,862	97.90	
Total rejected ballots		427	1.91	
Unreturned ballots		41	0.18	
Turnout		22,330	79.30	▲9.11
Registered electors		28,163		
Majority		6,769	30.96	▼0.22
DAP hold		Swing		
Source(s) "KEPUTUSAN PILIHAN RAYA UMUM DEWAN UNDANGAN NEGERI". Archived from the original on 2013-06-07.

Perak state election, 2008: Jalong
Party	Candidate	Votes	%	∆%
DAP	Leong Mee Meng	11,560	65.59	▲47.68
BN	Cheah Chee Kuan	6,065	34.41	▼25.42
Total valid votes		17,625	97.87	
Total rejected ballots		383	2.13	
Unreturned ballots		0	0	
Turnout		18,008	70.19	▲3.01
Registered electors		25,657		
Majority		5,495	31.18	▼6.39
DAP gain from BN		Swing		?
Source(s) "KEPUTUSAN PILIHAN RAYA UMUM DEWAN UNDANGAN NEGERI PERAK BAGI TAHUN 2008".

Perak state election, 2004: Jalong
Party	Candidate	Votes	%	∆%
BN	Chang Ko Youn	9,780	59.83	▲2.33
PKR	Kunasekaran A/L Krishnan	3,638	22.26	▲22.26
DAP	Ding Chin Aik	2,928	17.91	▼22.39
Total valid votes		16,346	97.33	
Total rejected ballots		435	2.59	
Unreturned ballots		13	0.08	
Turnout		16,794	67.18	▲2.66
Registered electors		24,998		
Majority		6,142	37.57	▲20.37
BN hold		Swing		
Source(s) "KEPUTUSAN PILIHAN RAYA UMUM DEWAN UNDANGAN NEGERI PERAK BAGI TAHUN 2004".

Perak state election, 1999: Jalong
Party	Candidate	Votes	%	∆%
BN	Chang Ko Youn	9,978	57.50	▼5.25
DAP	Lam Wai Mun	6,994	40.30	▲10.69
MDP	N. Ponniah	382	2.20	▲2.20
Total valid votes		17,354	97.41	
Total rejected ballots		431	2.42	
Unreturned ballots		30	0.17	
Turnout		17,815	64.52	▼3.24
Registered electors		27,611		
Majority		2,984	17.20	▼15.94
BN hold		Swing		
Source(s) "KEPUTUSAN PILIHAN RAYA UMUM DEWAN UNDANGAN NEGERI PERAK BAGI TAHUN 1999".

Perak state election, 1995: Jalong
Party	Candidate	Votes	%	∆%
BN	Chang Ko Youn	10,317	62.75	▲20.92
DAP	Lim Ah Guan @ Lim Soon Guan	4,869	29.61	▼28.56
Independent	Liew Sam Fong	1,256	7.64	▲7.64
Total valid votes		16,442	97.74	
Total rejected ballots		488	2.87	
Unreturned ballots		66	0.39	
Turnout		16,996	67.76	▼1.40
Registered electors		25,082		
Majority		5,448	33.14	▲16.80
BN gain from DAP		Swing		?
Source(s) "KEPUTUSAN PILIHAN RAYA UMUM DEWAN UNDANGAN NEGERI PERAK BAGI TAHUN 1995".

Perak state election, 1990: Jalong
Party	Candidate	Votes	%	∆%
DAP	Ngoi Thiam Woh	9,092	58.17	▲12.24
BN	Chang Ko Youn	6,537	41.83	▲8.65
Total valid votes		15,629	97.49	
Total rejected ballots		402	2.51	
Unreturned ballots		0	0	
Turnout		16,031	69.16	▼4.71
Registered electors		23,179		
Majority		2,555	16.34	▲3.59
DAP hold		Swing		
Source(s) "KEPUTUSAN PILIHAN RAYA UMUM DEWAN UNDANGAN NEGERI PERAK BAGI TAHUN 1990".

Perak state election, 1986: Jalong
Party	Candidate	Votes	%	∆%
DAP	Liew Sam Fong	6,341	45.93	▲5.15
BN	Tai Chee Chai @ Tai Tack Choo	4,580	33.18	▼26.04
Independent	Lim Ah Guan @ Lim Soon Guan	2,516	18.23	▲18.23
SDP	Fan Lew Leng @ Fan Yew Teng	368	2.67	▲2.67
Total valid votes		13,805	100.00	
Total rejected ballots		641		
Unreturned ballots		0		
Turnout		14,446	73.87	▼3.19
Registered electors		19,557		
Majority		1,761	12.76	▼5.67
DAP gain from BN		Swing		?
Source(s) "KEPUTUSAN PILIHAN RAYA UMUM DEWAN UNDANGAN NEGERI PERAK BAGI TAHUN 1986".

Perak state election, 1982: Jalong
Party	Candidate	Votes	%	∆%
BN	Lim Keng Yaik	7,789	59.21	▲9.02
DAP	Ngoi Thiam Woh	5,365	40.79	▼8.08
Total valid votes		13,154	100.00	
Total rejected ballots		330		
Unreturned ballots		0		
Turnout		13,484	77.05	▼3.31
Registered electors		17,500		
Majority		2,424	18.43	▲17.10
BN hold		Swing		

Perak state election, 1978: Jalong
Party	Candidate	Votes	%	∆%
BN	Lim Keng Yaik	5,762	50.19	▲50.19
DAP	Ngan Siong Hing	5,610	48.87	▼13.59
UDP	Lee Heng	108	0.94	▲0.94
Total valid votes		11,480	100.00	
Total rejected ballots		528		
Unreturned ballots		0		
Turnout		12,008	80.36	▲0.78
Registered electors		14,942		
Majority		152	1.32	▼31.12
BN gain from DAP		Swing		-

Perak state election, 1974: Jalong
Party	Candidate	Votes	%	∆%
DAP	Ngan Siong Hing	6,304	62.46	▲62.46
BN	Soo How Yin	3,029	30.01	▼29.06
Independent	Balakrishnan a/l Kannan	439	4.35	▲4.35
Independent	R. C. Mahadeva Rayan	321	3.18	▲3.18
Total valid votes		10,093	100.00	
Total rejected ballots		398		
Unreturned ballots		0		
Turnout		10,491	79.58	▲0.95
Registered electors		13,183		
Majority		3,275	32.45	▲10.87
DAP gain from PPP		Swing		-

Perak state election, 1969: Jalong
Party	Candidate	Votes	%	∆%
PPP	R. C. Mahadeva Rayan	5,339	59.07	▲32.07
Alliance	Teh Hin Chong	3,389	37.50	▼25.07
PAS	Ahmad Zawazi bin Ibrahim	310	3.43	▲3.43
Total valid votes		9,038	100.00	
Total rejected ballots		446		
Unreturned ballots		0		
Turnout		9,484	78.63	▼6.40
Registered electors		12,061		
Majority		1,950	21.58	▼13.98
PPP gain from Alliance		Swing		-

Perak state election, 1964: Jalong
Party	Candidate	Votes	%	∆%
Alliance	See Khoon Lim	4,960	62.56	▲8.95
PPP	Yeoh Eng Chai	2,141	27.01	▼19.38
Socialist Front	Lee Khen	827	10.43	▲10.43
Total valid votes		7,928	100.00	
Total rejected ballots		264		
Unreturned ballots		0		
Turnout		8,192	85.03	▲12.43
Registered electors		9,634		
Majority		2,819	35.56	▲28.33
Alliance hold		Swing		

Perak state election, 1959: Jalong
Party	Candidate	Votes	%
Alliance	See Khoon Lim	3,294	53.61
PPP	Choy Kok Kuan	2,850	46.39
Total valid votes		6,144	100.00
Total rejected ballots		91	
Unreturned ballots		0	
Turnout		6,235	72.60
Registered electors		8,588	
Majority		444	7.23
This was a new constituency created.
