= Pantai Remis (state constituency) =

Political subdivision in Malaysia

Pantai Remis (N37)
Perak constituency

State constituency
- Legislature: Perak State Legislative Assembly
MLA
Wong May Ing
PH
- Constituency created: 1974
- First contested: 1974
- Last contested: 2022

Demographics
- Electors (2022): 44,432

Pantai Remis is a state constituency in Perak, Malaysia, that has been represented in the Perak State Legislative Assembly.

== Demographics ==
Ethnic breakdown of Pantai Remis's electorate as of 2022
1. Chinese (62.9%)
2. Indian (19.2%)
3. Malay (17.4%)
4. Other ethnicities (0.52%)

== History ==
=== Polling districts ===
According to the federal gazette issued on 31 October 2022, the Pantai Remis constituency is divided into 16 polling districts.

| State constituency | Polling Districts | Code | Location |
|---|---|---|---|
| Pantai Remis (N37） | Pantai Remis | 068/37/01 | SK Pantai Remis |
| Pantai Remis (N37） | Taman Bintang | 068/37/02 | SM Yik Ching |
| Pantai Remis (N37） | Kampong Indah | 068/37/03 | SMK Pantai Remis |
| Pantai Remis (N37） | Kampong Sungai Batu | 068/37/04 | SK Sungai Batu |
| Pantai Remis (N37） | Ladang Segari | 068/37/05 | SK Segari |
| Pantai Remis (N37） | Segari | 068/37/06 | SJK (C) Pei Min |
| Pantai Remis (N37） | Changkat Keruing | 068/37/07 | SJK (C) Khuen Hean |
| Pantai Remis (N37） | Ladang Cashwood | 068/37/08 | SJK (T) Kampong Tun Sambanthan |
| Pantai Remis (N37） | Kampong Merbau | 068/37/09 | SJK (C) Kampong Merbau |
| Pantai Remis (N37） | Kampong Raja Hitam | 068/37/10 | SJK (C) Pei Min |
| Pantai Remis (N37） | Bunga Raya | 068/37/11 | SK Methodist |
| Pantai Remis (N37） | Taman Sri Ayer Tawar | 068/37/12 | SJK (C) Min Te |
| Pantai Remis (N37） | Ayer Tawar Baharu | 068/37/13 | SMK Ayer Tawar |
| Pantai Remis (N37） | Taman Dinding | 068/37/14 | SMK Ambrose; SJK (T) Ayer Tawar |
| Pantai Remis (N37） | Ayer Tawar Selatan | 068/37/15 | SMK Methodist |
| Pantai Remis (N37） | Ayer Tawar Tengah | 068/37/16 | SMK Methodist |

=== Representative history ===
Perak State Legislative Assemblyman for Pantai Remis
| Assembly | No | Years | Member | Party |
Constituency created from Ayer Tawar
| 4th | N26 | 1974 – 1978 | Young Heow Choo (杨显著) | DAP |
| 5th | N26 | 1978 – 1982 | Young Heow Choo (杨显著) | DAP |
| 6th | N26 | 1982 – 1986 | Yu Yang Kien (余养剑) | DAP |
| 7th | N28 | 1986 – 1990 | Yu Yang Kien (余养剑) | DAP |
| 8th | N28 | 1990 – 1995 | Ngo Tick Wong (吴德旺) | GR (DAP) |
| 9th | N32 | 1995 – 1999 | Wong Chong Sang (黃宗双) | BN (MCA) |
| 10th | N32 | 1999 – 2004 | Nga Kor Ming (倪可敏) | BA (DAP) |
| 11th | N37 | 2004 – 2008 | Nga Kor Ming (倪可敏) | DAP |
| 12th | N37 | 2008 – 2013 | Nga Kor Ming (倪可敏) | PR (DAP) |
| 13th | N37 | 2013 – 2015 | Wong May Ing (黃渼沄) | PR (DAP) |
| 13th | N37 | 2015 – 2018 | Wong May Ing (黃渼沄) | PH (DAP) |
| 14th | N37 | 2018 – 2022 | Wong May Ing (黃渼沄) | PH (DAP) |
| 15th | N37 | 2022–present | Wong May Ing (黃渼沄) | PH (DAP) |

== Election results ==
Perak state election, 2022
| Party | Candidate | Votes | % | ∆% |
|---|---|---|---|---|
| PH | Wong May Ing | 20,840 | 72.24 | ▲72.24 |
| BN | Albert Looi Tuan Gin | 4,408 | 15.28 | ▼6.86 |
| PN | Eee Chin Oon | 3,600 | 12.48 | ▲12.48 |
| Total valid votes | | 28,848 | 100.00 | |
| Total rejected ballots | | 408 | | |
| Unreturned ballots | | 52 | | |
| Turnout | | 29,308 | 65.96 | ▼9.71 |
| Registered electors | | 44,432 | | |
| Majority | | 16,432 | 56.96 | ▲1.24 |
| PH hold | | Swing | | |

Perak state election, 2018
| Party | Candidate | Votes | % | ∆% |
|---|---|---|---|---|
| PKR | Wong May Ing | 18,608 | 77.86 | ▲77.86 |
| BN | Ho Kean Wei | 5,292 | 22.14 | ▲8.70 |
| Total valid votes | | 23,900 | 97.64 | |
| Total rejected ballots | | 498 | 2.03 | |
| Unreturned ballots | | 79 | 0.32 | |
| Turnout | | 24,477 | 75.67 | ▼3.63 |
| Registered electors | | 32,346 | | |
| Majority | | 13,316 | 55.72 | ▲17.40 |
| PKR hold | | Swing | | |
Source(s) "RESULTS OF CONTESTED ELECTION AND STATEMENTS OF THE POLL AFTER THE OFFICIAL ADDITION OF VOTES".

Perak state election, 2013
| Party | Candidate | Votes | % | ∆% |
|---|---|---|---|---|
| DAP | Wong May Ing | 17,092 | 69.16 | ▲6.01 |
| BN | Koh Ser Yun | 7,621 | 30.84 | ▼6.01 |
| Total valid votes | | 24,713 | 98.18 | |
| Total rejected ballots | | 419 | 1.66 | |
| Unreturned ballots | | 40 | 0.16 | |
| Turnout | | 25,172 | 79.30 | ▲8.93 |
| Registered electors | | 31,746 | | |
| Majority | | 9,471 | 38.32 | ▲12.02 |
| DAP hold | | Swing | | |
Source(s) "KEPUTUSAN PILIHAN RAYA UMUM DEWAN UNDANGAN NEGERI". Archived from the original on 2022-04-01.

Perak state election, 2008
| Party | Candidate | Votes | % | ∆% |
|---|---|---|---|---|
| DAP | Nga Kor Ming | 12,188 | 63.15 | ▲6.42 |
| BN | Ooi Jing Ting | 7,112 | 36.85 | ▼6.42 |
| Total valid votes | | 19,300 | 97.91 | |
| Total rejected ballots | | 354 | 1.80 | |
| Unreturned ballots | | 58 | 0.29 | |
| Turnout | | 19,712 | 70.37 | ▲4.19 |
| Registered electors | | 28,011 | | |
| Majority | | 5,076 | 26.30 | ▲12.84 |
| DAP hold | | Swing | | |
Source(s) "KEPUTUSAN PILIHAN RAYA UMUM DEWAN UNDANGAN NEGERI PERAK BAGI TAHUN 2008".

Perak state election, 2004
| Party | Candidate | Votes | % | ∆% |
|---|---|---|---|---|
| DAP | Nga Kor Ming | 9,703 | 56.73 | ▼0.32 |
| BN | Wong Chong Sang | 7,400 | 43.27 | ▲0.32 |
| Total valid votes | | 17,103 | 96.98 | |
| Total rejected ballots | | 503 | 2.85 | |
| Unreturned ballots | | 29 | 0.16 | |
| Turnout | | 17,635 | 66.18 | ▲2.09 |
| Registered electors | | 26,646 | | |
| Majority | | 2,303 | 13.46 | ▼0.64 |
| DAP hold | | Swing | | |
Source(s) "KEPUTUSAN PILIHAN RAYA UMUM DEWAN UNDANGAN NEGERI PERAK BAGI TAHUN 2004".

Perak state election, 1999
| Party | Candidate | Votes | % | ∆% |
|---|---|---|---|---|
| DAP | Nga Kor Ming | 9,896 | 57.05 | ▲17.89 |
| BN | Wong Chong Sang | 7,449 | 42.95 | ▼3.79 |
| Total valid votes | | 17,345 | 97.91 | |
| Total rejected ballots | | 371 | 2.09 | |
| Unreturned ballots | | 0 | 0.00 | |
| Turnout | | 17,716 | 64.09 | ▼2.27 |
| Registered electors | | 27,643 | | |
| Majority | | 2,447 | 14.10 | ▼4.98 |
| DAP gain from BN | | Swing | | ? |
Source(s) "KEPUTUSAN PILIHAN RAYA UMUM DEWAN UNDANGAN NEGERI PERAK BAGI TAHUN 1999".

Perak state election, 1995
| Party | Candidate | Votes | % | ∆% |
|---|---|---|---|---|
| BN | Wong Chong Sang | 9,645 | 58.24 | ▲54.53 |
| DAP | Ngo Tick Wong | 6,485 | 39.16 | ▼23.68 |
| Independent | Tan Kiat Seng @ Shuk Yik | 430 | 2.60 | ▲2.60 |
| Total valid votes | | 16,560 | 97.54 | |
| Total rejected ballots | | 390 | 2.30 | |
| Unreturned ballots | | 27 | 0.16 | |
| Turnout | | 16,977 | 66.36 | ▼4.11 |
| Registered electors | | 25,583 | | |
| Majority | | 3,160 | 19.08 | ▼6.60 |
| BN gain from DAP | | Swing | | ? |
Source(s) "KEPUTUSAN PILIHAN RAYA UMUM DEWAN UNDANGAN NEGERI PERAK BAGI TAHUN 1995".

Perak state election, 1990
| Party | Candidate | Votes | % | ∆% |
|---|---|---|---|---|
| DAP | Ngo Tick Wong | 9,868 | 62.84 | ▲0.41 |
| BN | Wong Chong Sang | 5,836 | 37.16 | ▼0.41 |
| Total valid votes | | 15,704 | 97.34 | |
| Total rejected ballots | | 429 | 2.66 | |
| Unreturned ballots | | 0 | 0.00 | |
| Turnout | | 16,133 | 70.47 | ▼2.32 |
| Registered electors | | 22,895 | | |
| Majority | | 4,032 | 25.68 | ▲33.82 |
| DAP hold | | Swing | | |
Source(s) "KEPUTUSAN PILIHAN RAYA UMUM DEWAN UNDANGAN NEGERI PERAK BAGI TAHUN 1990".

Perak state election, 1986
| Party | Candidate | Votes | % | ∆% |
|---|---|---|---|---|
| DAP | Yu Yang Kien | 9,229 | 62.43 | ▲21.59 |
| BN | Kathirgamer Nagalingam | 5,555 | 37.57 | ▲1.45 |
| Total valid votes | | 14,784 | 100.00 | |
| Total rejected ballots | | 397 | | |
| Unreturned ballots | | 0 | | |
| Turnout | | 15,181 | 72.79 | ▼3.79 |
| Registered electors | | 20,856 | | |
| Majority | | 3,674 | 24.85 | ▲20.14 |
| DAP hold | | Swing | | |
Source(s) "KEPUTUSAN PILIHAN RAYA UMUM DEWAN UNDANGAN NEGERI PERAK BAGI TAHUN 1986".

Perak state election, 1982
| Party | Candidate | Votes | % | ∆% |
|---|---|---|---|---|
| DAP | Yu Yang Kien | 5,726 | 40.84 | ▼19.47 |
| BN | Lai Hai Meng | 5,066 | 36.13 | ▲0.48 |
| Independent | Ho Teh Hong | 2,091 | 14.91 | ▲14.91 |
| Independent | Young Heow Choo | 1,139 | 8.12 | ▲8.12 |
| Total valid votes | | 14,022 | 100.00 | |
| Total rejected ballots | | 296 | | |
| Unreturned ballots | | 0 | | |
| Turnout | | 14,318 | 76.58 | ▼1.55 |
| Registered electors | | 18,696 | | |
| Majority | | 660 | 4.71 | ▼19.95 |
| DAP hold | | Swing | | |

Perak state election, 1978
| Party | Candidate | Votes | % | ∆% |
|---|---|---|---|---|
| DAP | Young Heow Choo | 7,338 | 60.31 | ▲16.57 |
| BN | Paramijk Singh Tara Singh | 4,338 | 35.65 | ▲35.65 |
| PAS | Mohamed Darus | 492 | 4.04 | ▲4.04 |
| Total valid votes | | 12,168 | 100.00 | |
| Total rejected ballots | | 414 | | |
| Unreturned ballots | | 0 | | |
| Turnout | | 12,582 | 78.13 | ▲3.05 |
| Registered electors | | 16,104 | | |
| Majority | | 3,000 | 24.65 | ▲13.39 |
| DAP hold | | Swing | | |

Perak state election, 1974
| Party | Candidate | Votes | % |
|---|---|---|---|
| DAP | Young Heow Choo | 4,035 | 43.74 |
| BN | Yeoh Eng Chai | 2,996 | 32.47 |
| Independent | Tan Kee Chew | 1,412 | 15.30 |
| PEKEMAS | Teoh Hoi Sim | 510 | 5.53 |
| Independent | Lam Kam Wah | 273 | 2.96 |
| Total valid votes | | 9,226 | 100.00 |
| Total rejected ballots | | 547 | |
| Unreturned ballots | | 0 | |
| Turnout | | 9,773 | 75.08 |
| Registered electors | | 13,016 | |
| Majority | | 1,039 | 11.26 |
This was a new constituency created.
