= Perak State Legislative Assembly =

Legislative branch of the Perak state government

Perak State Legislative Assembly Dewan Negeri Perak ديوان نݢري ڤيراق
- 15th Perak State Assembly

Type
- Type: Unicameral

History
- Founded: 21 July 1959

Leadership
- Sultan: Sultan Nazrin Muizzuddin Shah since 29 May 2014
- Speaker: Mohamad Zahir Abdul Khalid, BN–UMNO since 12 May 2020
- Deputy Speaker: Jenny Choy Tsi Jen, PH–DAP since 19 December 2022
- Menteri Besar: Saarani Mohamad, BN–UMNO since 10 December 2020
- Leader of the Opposition: Razman Zakaria, PAS since 9 December 2022

Structure
- Seats: 59; Quorum: 20; Simple majority: 30; Two-thirds majority: 40
- Political groups: (As of 13 February 2026) Government (33); PH (24): DAP (18); PKR (5); AMANAH (1); BN (9): UMNO (8); MCA (1); Opposition (26); PN (26): PAS (17); WAWASAN (1); BERSATU (8); Speaker (1) BN (non-MLA)
- Length of term: Up to 5 years

Elections
- Voting system: Plurality: First-past-the-post (59 single-member constituencies)
- Last election: 19 November 2022
- Next election: By 17 February 2028

Meeting place
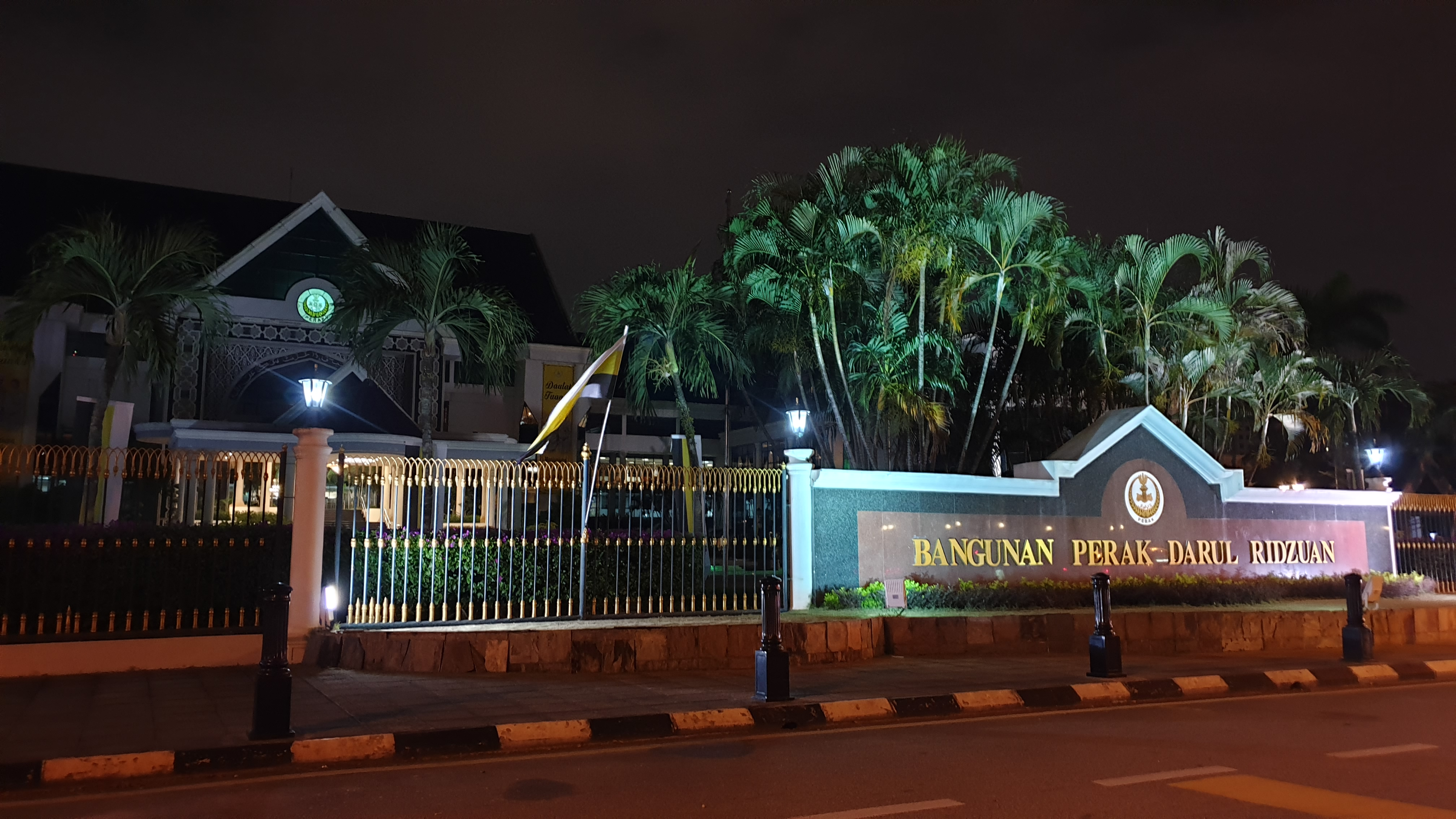
- Bangunan Perak Darul Ridzuan, Ipoh, Perak

Website
- www.perak.gov.my

The Perak State Legislative Assembly (Malay: Dewan Negeri Perak) is the unicameral state legislature of the Malaysian state of Perak. It is composed of 59 members representing single-member constituencies throughout the state. Elections are held no more than five years apart, along with elections to the federal parliament and other state assemblies.

The Assembly convenes at the Bangunan Perak Darul Ridzuan in the state capital, Ipoh. At 59 seats, it is the largest state assembly among the 11 legislatures of the States of Malaya.

Map of current constituencies (since 2018)

== Current composition ==
Government					Opposition
BN		PH			PN
9		24			26
8	1	18	5	1	17	8	1
UMNO	MCA	DAP	PKR	AMANAH	PAS	BERSATU	WAWASAN

No.	Parliamentary Constituency	No.	State Constituency	Member	Coalition (Party)	Post
-	-	-	Non-MLA	Mohamad Zahir Abdul Khalid	BN (UMNO)	Speaker
P54	Gerik	N01	Pengkalan Hulu	Mohamad Amin Roslan	PN (PAS)	N/A
P54	Gerik	N02	Temengor	Salbiah Mohamed	BN (UMNO)	EXCO Member
P55	Lenggong	N03	Kenering	Husairi Ariffin	PN (PAS)	N/A
P55	Lenggong	N04	Kota Tampan	Saarani Mohamad	BN (UMNO)	Menteri Besar
P56	Larut	N05	Selama	Mohd Akmal Kamaruddin	PN (PAS)	N/A
P56	Larut	N06	Kubu Gajah	Khalil Yahaya	PN (PAS)	N/A
P56	Larut	N07	Batu Kurau	Mohd Najmuddin Elias Al-Hafiz	PN (BERSATU)	N/A
P57	Parit Buntar	N08	Titi Serong	Hakimi Hamzi Hayat	PN (PAS)	N/A
P57	Parit Buntar	N09	Kuala Kurau	Abdul Yunus Jamahri	PN (BERSATU)	N/A
P58	Bagan Serai	N10	Alor Pongsu	Noor Azman Ghazali	PN (BERSATU)	N/A
P58	Bagan Serai	N11	Gunong Semanggol	Razman Zakaria	PN (PAS)	Leader of the Opposition
P58	Bagan Serai	N12	Selinsing	Sallehuddin Abdullah	PN (PAS)	N/A
P59	Bukit Gantang	N13	Kuala Sepetang	Ahmad Man	PN (BERSATU)	N/A
P59	Bukit Gantang	N14	Changkat Jering	Rahim Ismail	PN (PAS)	N/A
P59	Bukit Gantang	N15	Trong	Faisal Abdul Rahman	PN (PAS)	N/A
P60	Taiping	N16	Kamunting	Mohd Fakhrudin Abdul Aziz	PN (PAS)	N/A
P60	Taiping	N17	Pokok Assam	Ong Seng Guan	PH (DAP)	N/A
P60	Taiping	N18	Aulong	Teh Kok Lim	PH (DAP)	EXCO Member
P61	Padang Rengas	N19	Chenderoh	Syed Lukman Hakim Syed Mohd Zin	PN (BERSATU)	N/A
P61	Padang Rengas	N20	Lubok Merbau	Azizi Mohamed Ridzuan	PN (PAS)	N/A
P62	Sungai Siput	N21	Lintang	Mohd Zolkafly Harun	BN (UMNO)	EXCO Member
P62	Sungai Siput	N22	Jalong	Loh Sze Yee	PH (DAP)	EXCO Member
P63	Tambun	N23	Manjoi	Mohd Hafez Sabri	PN (PAS)	N/A
P63	Tambun	N24	Hulu Kinta	Muhamad Arafat Varisai Mahamad	PH (PKR)	N/A
P64	Ipoh Timor	N25	Canning	Jenny Choy Tsi Jen	PH (DAP)	Deputy Speaker
P64	Ipoh Timor	N26	Tebing Tinggi	Abdul Aziz Bari	PH (DAP)	N/A
P64	Ipoh Timor	N27	Pasir Pinji	Goh See Hua	PH (DAP)	N/A
P65	Ipoh Barat	N28	Bercham	Ong Boon Piow	PH (DAP)	N/A
P65	Ipoh Barat	N29	Kepayang	Nga Kor Ming	PH (DAP)	MP of Teluk Intan; Federal Minister
P65	Ipoh Barat	N30	Buntong	Thulsi Thivani Manogaran	PH (DAP)	N/A
P66	Batu Gajah	N31	Jelapang	Cheah Pou Hian	PH (DAP)	N/A
P66	Batu Gajah	N32	Menglembu	Steven Chaw Kam Foon	PH (DAP)	Political Secretary to the Minister of Housing and Local Government
P66	Batu Gajah	N33	Tronoh	Steven Tiw Tee Siang	PH (DAP)	N/A
P67	Kuala Kangsar	N34	Bukit Chandan	Hashim Bujang	PN (BERSATU)	N/A
P67	Kuala Kangsar	N35	Manong	Burhanuddin Ahmad	PN (PAS)	N/A
P68	Beruas	N36	Pengkalan Baharu	Azman Noh	BN (UMNO)	N/A
P68	Beruas	N37	Pantai Remis	Wong May Ing	PH (DAP)	N/A
P68	Beruas	N38	Astaka	Jason Ng Thien Yeong	PH (DAP)	N/A
P69	Parit	N39	Belanja	Khairudin Abu Hanipah	BN (UMNO)	EXCO Member
P69	Parit	N40	Bota	Najihatussalehah Ahmad	PN (PAS)	N/A
P70	Kampar	N41	Malim Nawar	Bavani Veraiah	PH (DAP)	N/A
P70	Kampar	N42	Keranji	Angeline Koo Haai Yen	PH (DAP)	N/A
P70	Kampar	N43	Tualang Sekah	Mohd Azlan Helmi	PH (PKR)	EXCO Member
P71	Gopeng	N44	Sungai Rapat	Mohammad Nizar Jamaluddin	PH (AMANAH)	EXCO Member; Former Menteri Besar of Perak
P71	Gopeng	N45	Simpang Pulai	Wong Chai Yi	PH (PKR)	N/A
P71	Gopeng	N46	Teja	Sandrea Ng Shy Ching	PH (PKR)	EXCO Member
P72	Tapah	N47	Chenderiang	Choong Shin Heng	BN (MCA)	N/A
P72	Tapah	N48	Ayer Kuning	Mohamad Yusri Bakir	BN (UMNO)	N/A
P73	Pasir Salak	N49	Sungai Manik	Zainol Fadzi Paharudin (Note: On 13 February 2026, Zainol had his party membership terminated and thus became an independent.)	PN (WAWASAN)	N/A
P73	Pasir Salak	N50	Kampong Gajah	Zafarulazlan Zan	PN (PAS)	N/A
P74	Lumut	N51	Pasir Panjang	Rosli Abd Rahman	PN (PAS)	N/A
P74	Lumut	N52	Pangkor	Norhaslinda Zakaria	PN (BERSATU)	N/A
P75	Bagan Datuk	N53	Rungkup	Shahrul Zaman Yahya	BN (UMNO)	N/A
P75	Bagan Datuk	N54	Hutan Melintang	Wasanthee Sinnasamy	PH (PKR)	N/A
P76	Teluk Intan	N55	Pasir Bedamar	Woo Kah Leong	PH (DAP)	EXCO Member
P76	Teluk Intan	N56	Changkat Jong	Nadziruddin Mohamed Bandi	PN (BERSATU)	N/A
P77	Tanjong Malim	N57	Sungkai	Sivanesan Achalingam	PH (DAP)	EXCO Member
P77	Tanjong Malim	N58	Slim	Muhammad Zulfadli Zainal	PN (PAS)	N/A
P77	Tanjong Malim	N59	Behrang	Salina Samsudin	BN (UMNO)	N/A

== Seating arrangement ==
Vacant		N54 Hutan Melintang	N38 Astaka	N33 Tronoh		N30 Buntong
N19 Chenderoh	N48 Ayer Kuning	N17 Pokok Assam		N42 Keranji	N41 Malim Nawar	N27 Pasir Pinji
N01 Pengkalan Hulu	N47 Chenderiang	E			N32 Menglembu	N45 Simpang Pulai
N08 Titi Serong	N52 Pangkor	F		D	N36 Pengkalan Baharu	N31 Jelapang
N58 Slim	N35 Manong	F		D	N37 Pantai Remis	N59 Behrang
N50 Kampong Gajah	N12 Selinsing	F		D	N53 Rungkup	N28 Bercham
N10 Alor Pongsu	N13 Kuala Sepetang	G	Sergeant-at-Arm	C	N29 Kepayang	N24 Hulu Kinta
N16 Kamunting	N03 Kenering	G		C	N26 Tebing Tinggi	N25 Canning (Deputy Speaker)
N15 Trong	N40 Bota	G		C	N18 Aulong (EXCO Member)	N55 Pasir Bedamar (EXCO Member)
N14 Changkat Jering	N56 Changkat Jong	H		B	N02 Temengor (EXCO Member)	N43 Tualang Sekah (EXCO Member)
N20 Lubok Merbau	N09 Kuala Kurau	H	the Mace	B	N22 Jalong (EXCO Member)	N39 Belanja (EXCO Member)
N34 Bukit Chandan}	N07 Batu Kurau	H		B	N57 Sungkai (EXCO Member)	N46 Teja (EXCO Member)
N51 Pasir Panjang	N05 Selama	I		A	N44 Sungai Rapat (EXCO Member)	State Financial Officer
N23 Manjoi	N49 Sungai Manik	I		A	N21 Lintang (Senior EXCO Member)	State Legal Advisor
N06 Kubu Gajah	N11 Gunong Semanggol (Opposition Leader)	I	Secretary	A	N04 Kota Tampan (Menteri Besar)	State Secretary
			Speaker
			Sultan

== Role ==
The Perak State Legislative Assembly enacts laws that apply in Perak. It must hold at least three sittings a year and table a budget in March and late October or early November. The Speaker presides over sittings in the Assembly and ensures order during debates. The present Speaker is Mohamad Zahir Abdul Khalid.

The majority party or coalition in the Assembly forms the state government, led by the Menteri Besar. He appoints the state executive council, or EXCO (Majlis Mesyuarat Kerajaan), drawing from members of the Assembly.

== Speakers of The Assembly ==
No.	Speaker	Term start	Term end	Party	Constituency	Remarks
1	Sulaiman Bulon	1959	1963	BN (UMNO)	Non-MLA	
2	Ali Zaini Mohd Zain	1964	1974	BN (UMNO)	Karai (now part of Lintang)	
3	Shafie Mat Saman	1974	1978	BN (UMNO)	Manong	
4	Ahmad Azizuddin Zainal Abidin	1978	1982	BN (UMNO)	Non-MLA	
5	Shamsuddin Din	1982	1986	BN (UMNO)	Temengor	
6	Abdul Malik Ahmad	1987	1988	BN (UMNO)	Non-MLA	
7	Umar Ismail	1988	1990	BN (UMNO)	Non-MLA	
8	Mohd Arshad Abdullah	1990	1995	BN (UMNO)	Changkat Jong	
9	Mohamed Nazri Abd Rahim	1995	1999	BN (UMNO)	Sungai Manik	
10	Junus Wahid	1999	2004	BN (UMNO)	Slim	
11	V. Sivakumar	25 April 2008	7 May 2009	PR (DAP)	Tronoh	1st Indian speaker
12	Ganesan Retanam	7 May 2009	5 May 2013	BN (MIC)	Non-MLA	
13	Devamany S. Krishnasamy	28 June 2013	9 August 2016	BN (MIC)	Non-MLA	
14	Thangasvari Suppiah	9 August 2016	9 April 2018	BN (MIC)	Non-MLA	1st female speaker
15	Ngeh Koo Ham	2 July 2018	12 May 2020	PH (DAP)	Non-MLA	MP of Beruas, 1st Chinese speaker
16	Mohamad Zahir Abdul Khalid	15 May 2020	Incumbent	BN (UMNO)	Non-MLA	

Source: Perak State Legislative Assembly

== Election pendulum ==
The 15th General Election witnessed 33 governmental seats and 26 non-governmental seats filled the Perak State Legislative Assembly. The government side has 15 safe seats and 3 fairly safe seats, while the non-government side has 3 fairly safe seats and no safe seats.

2022 Perak state election

GOVERNMENT SEATS
Marginal
Tualang Sekah	Mohd Azlan Helmi	PKR	34.41
Behrang	Salina Samsudin	UMNO	34.42
Ayer Kuning	Ishsam Shahruddin	UMNO	38.73
Hulu Kinta	Muhamad Arafat Varisai Mahamad	PKR	39.02
Chenderiang	Choong Shin Heng	MCA	39.86
Tebing Tinggi	Abdul Aziz Bari	DAP	40.58
Pengkalan Baharu	Azman Noh	UMNO	40.58
Sungai Rapat	Mohammad Nizar Jamaluddin	AMANAH	41.91
Hutan Melintang	Wasanthee Sinnasamy	PKR	43.06
Temengor	Salbiah Mohamed	UMNO	43.12
Teja	Sandrea Ng Shy Ching	PKR	46.50
Belanja	Khairudin Abu Hanipah	UMNO	47.03
Kota Tampan	Saarani Mohamad	UMNO	48.24
Lintang	Mohd Zolkafly Harun	UMNO	48.43
Rungkup	Shahrul Zaman Yahya	UMNO	49.55
Fairly safe
Malim Nawar	Bavani Veriah	DAP	58.57
Sungkai	Sivanesan Achalingam	DAP	58.97
Jalong	Loh Sze Yee	DAP	59.08
Safe
Tronoh	Steven Tiw Tee Siang	DAP	63.65
Aulong	Teh Kok Lim	DAP	66.22
Pokok Assam	Ong Seng Guan	DAP	67.36
Simpang Pulai	Wong Chai Yi	PKR	69.18
Keranji	Angeline Koo Haai Yen	DAP	69.46
Pantai Remis	Wong May Ing	DAP	72.24
Kepayang	Nga Kor Ming	DAP	72.60
Pasir Bedamar	Woo Kah Leong	DAP	76.64
Astaka	Jason Ng Thien Yeong	DAP	78.16
Bercham	Ong Boon Piow	DAP	81.24
Buntong	Thulsi Thivani Manogaran	DAP	84.02
Canning	Jenny Choy Tsi Jen	DAP	87.10
Menglembu	Chaw Kam Foon	DAP	87.93
Jelapang	Cheah Pou Hian	DAP	88.71
Pasir Pinji	Goh See Hua	DAP	90.47

NON-GOVERNMENT SEATS
Marginal
Changkat Jong	Nadziruddin Mohamed Bandi	BERSATU	36.02
Bukit Chandan	Hashim Bujang	BERSATU	38.43
Pangkor	Norhaslinda Zakaria	BERSATU	38.65
Slim	Muhammad Zulfadli Zainal	PAS	38.87
Chenderoh	Syed Lukman Hakim	BERSATU	39.44
Pasir Panjang	Rosli Abd Rahman	PAS	41.05
Kuala Sepetang	Ahmad Man	BERSATU	41.34
Changkat Jering	Rahim Ismail	PAS	41.89
Kuala Kurau	Abdul Yunus Jamahari	BERSATU	41.97
Trong	Muhammad Faisal Abdul Rahman	PAS	43.77
Sungai Manik	Zainol Fadzi Paharudin	BERSATU	43.94
Kamunting	Mohd Fakhrudin Abd Aziz	PAS	43.98
Manong	Burhanuddin Ahmad	PAS	44.04
Manjoi	Mohd Hafez Sabri	PAS	44.14
Selinsing	Salehuddin Abdullah	BERSATU	46.48
Kenering	Husairi Ariffin	PAS	46.99
Bota	Najihatussalehah Ahmad	PAS	47.09
Lubok Merbau	Azizi Mohamed Ridzuwan	PAS	47.17
Pengkalan Hulu	Amin Roslan	PAS	47.60
Alor Pongsu	Noor Azman Ghazali	PAS	47.78
Titi Serong	Hakimi Hamzi Mohd Hayat	PAS	47.84
Batu Kurau	Mohd Najmuddin Alias	BERSATU	50.67
Kampong Gajah	Zafarulazhan Zan	PAS	51.03
Fairly safe
Selama	Akmal Kamarudin	PAS	58.32
Kubu Gajah	Khalil Yahaya	PAS	59.16
Gunong Semanggol	Razman Zakaria	PAS	59.29

== List of Assemblies ==
Assembly	Term began	Members	Committee	Majority party/coalition
State Council	1955	45	Abdul Wahab (1955–1957); Mohamed Ghazali I (1957–1959)	NAP–Alliance (UMNO–MCA–MIC) (1955–1957); Alliance (UMNO–MCA–MIC) (1957–1959)
1st	1959	40	Shaari	Alliance (UMNO–MCA–MIC)
2nd	1964	40	Ahmad Said I	Alliance (UMNO–MCA–MIC)
3rd	1969	40	Kamaruddin	Alliance (UMNO–MCA) (1969–1972); Alliance (UMNO–MCA)–PPP–GERAKAN–PAS (1972–1973)
3rd	1969	40	Kamaruddin	BN (UMNO–MCA–PPP–GERAKAN–PAS) (1973–1974)
4th	1974	43	Mohamed Ghazali II (1974–1977); Wan Mohammed I (1977–1978)	BN (UMNO–MCA–MIC–PPP–PAS–GERAKAN) (1974–1977); BN (UMNO–MCA–MIC–PPP–GERAKAN) (1977–1978)
5th	1978	43	Wan Mohamed II	BN (UMNO–MCA–MIC–GERAKAN–PPP)
6th	1982	43	Wan Mohamed III (1982–1983); Ramli I (1983–1986)	BN (UMNO–MCA–MIC–GERAKAN)
7th	1986	46	Ramli II	BN (UMNO–MCA–MIC–GERAKAN–PPP)
8th	1990	46	Ramli III	BN (UMNO–MCA–MIC–GERAKAN)
9th	1995	52	Ramli IV	BN (UMNO–MCA–MIC–GERAKAN)
10th	1999	52	Tajol Rosli I	BN (UMNO–MCA–MIC–GERAKAN)
11th	2004	59	Tajol Rosli II	BN (UMNO–MCA–MIC–GERAKAN)
12th	2008	59	Mohamad Nizar (2008–2009)	PR (PAS–DAP–PKR)
12th	2008	59	Zambry I (2009–2013)	BN (UMNO–MCA) (2009–2010); BN (UMNO–MCA–PPP) (2010–2013)
13th	2013	59	Zambry II	BN (UMNO–MCA)
14th	2018	59	Ahmad Faizal I (2018–2020)	PH (BERSATU–DAP–AMANAH–PKR)
14th	2018	59	Ahmad Faizal II (2020)	PN (BERSATU–PAS)–BN (UMNO)–GERAKAN
14th	2018	59	Saarani I (2020–2022)	BN (UMNO)–PN (BERSATU–PAS)–GERAKAN (2020–2021); BN (UMNO)–PN (PAS–BERSATU–GERAKAN) (2021); BN (UMNO)–PN (PAS–BERSATU) (2021–2022); BN (UMNO)–PN (PAS–BERSATU)–PBM (2022)
15th	2022	59	Saarani II	BN (UMNO–MCA)–PH (DAP–PKR–AMANAH)

== See also ==
- List of State Seats Representatives in Malaysia
- State legislative assemblies of Malaysia
- 2009 Perak constitutional crisis
- 2020 vote of no confidence in the Faizal Azumu ministry
