= Saarani Mohamad =

Malaysian politician and teacher (born 1961)

Yang Amat Berhormat Dato' Seri Saarani Mohamad SPMP DPCM AMN AMP PJK MLA
- ساراني محمد
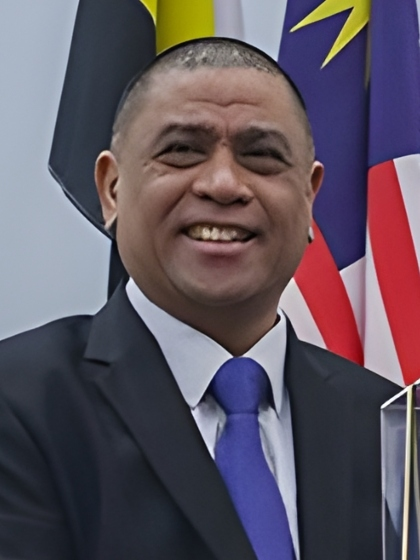

13th Menteri Besar of Perak
- Incumbent
- Assumed office 10 December 2020
- Monarch: Nazrin Shah
- Preceded by: Ahmad Faizal Azumu
- Constituency: Kota Tampan

State Leader of the Opposition of Perak
- In office 1 August 2018 – 13 March 2020
- Monarch: Nazrin Shah
- Menteri Besar: Ahmad Faizal Azumu
- Preceded by: Zambry Abdul Kadir
- Succeeded by: Abdul Aziz Bari
- Constituency: Kota Tampan

Member of the Perak State Legislative Assembly for Kota Tampan
- Incumbent
- Assumed office 21 March 2004
- Preceded by: Position established
- Majority: 2,677 (2004); 2,335 (2008); 1,844 (2013); 2,302 (2018); 1,237 (2022)

Member of the Perak State Legislative Assembly for Lenggong
- In office 29 November 1999 – 21 March 2004
- Succeeded by: Position abolished
- Majority: 2,411 (1999)

Exco roles (Perak)
- 2004–2006: Chairman of the Rural Development
- 2006–2008: Chairman of the Information, Rural Development, Plantation Industries and Commodities
- 2008–2013: Chairman of the Rural Development, Poverty Eradication, Plantations and Welfare
- 2013–2016: Chairman of the Rural Development, Plantations, Agriculture, Housing and Local Government
- 2016–2018: Chairman of the Rural Development, Agriculture, Plantations, Information and Human Capital Development
- 2020: Chairman of the Rural Development, Entrepreneur, Co-operatives and Consumer Affairs

Personal details
- Born: Saarani bin Mohamad; 13 March 1961 (age 65) Lenggong, Perak, Federation of Malaya (now Malaysia)
- Citizenship: Malaysian
- Party: United Malays National Organisation (UMNO)
- Other political affiliations: Barisan Nasional (BN)
- Education: University of Technology, Malaysia; Open University Malaysia
- Occupation: Politician, teacher

Saarani bin Mohamad (born 13 March 1961) is a Malaysian politician and teacher who has served as 13th Menteri Besar of Perak since December 2020 and Member of the Perak State Legislative Assembly (MLA) for Kota Tampan since March 2004. He served as Member of the Perak State Executive Council (EXCO) in the Barisan Nasional (BN) state administrations under former Menteris Besar Tajol Rosli Mohd Ghazali and Zambry Abdul Kadir from March 2004 to the collapse of the BN state administration in March 2008 and from February 2009 to another collapse in May 2018 and again in the Perikatan Nasional (PN) state administration under former Menteri Besar Ahmad Faizal Azumu briefly from March 2020 to the collapse of the PN administration in December 2020, Leader of the Opposition of Perak from August 2018 to March 2020 as well as the MLA for Lenggong from November 1999 to March 2004. He is a member of the Supreme Council and Division Chief of Lenggong of the United Malays National Organisation (UMNO), a component party of the BN coalition. He is also the State Chairman of BN and UMNO of Perak.

== Election results ==
Perak State Legislative Assembly
Year	Constituency	Candidate	Votes	Pct	Opponent(s)	Votes	Pct	Ballots cast	Majority	Turnout
1999	N16 Lenggong	Saarani Mohamad (UMNO)	6,427	59.95%	Azizan Mohd Desa (PAS)	3,986	37.18%	10,720	2,441	63.52%
2004	N04 Kota Tampan	Saarani Mohamad (UMNO)	5,071	67.93%	Hamzah Mohd Zain (PKR)	2,394	32.07%	7,608	2,677	69.31%
2008	N04 Kota Tampan	Saarani Mohamad (UMNO)	4,963	65.38%	Hamzah Mohd Zain (PKR)	2,628	34.62%	7,761	2,335	73.12%
2013	N04 Kota Tampan	Saarani Mohamad (UMNO)	5,893	59.27%	Zahrul Nizam Abdul Majid (PKR)	4,049	40.73%	16,588	1,844	87.00%
2018	N04 Kota Tampan	Saarani Mohamad (UMNO)	5,183	52.36%	Muhammad Rif'aat Razman (PAS)	2,881	29.11%	10,097	2,302	79.00%
2018	N04 Kota Tampan	Saarani Mohamad (UMNO)	5,183	52.36%	Noor Hasnida Mohd Hashim (BERSATU)	1,834	18.53%	10,097	2,302	79.00%
2022	N04 Kota Tampan	Saarani Mohamad (UMNO)	5,468	48.24%	Jamil Yahya (PAS)	4,231	37.32%	11,336	1,237	73.83%
2022	N04 Kota Tampan	Saarani Mohamad (UMNO)	5,468	48.24%	Mohd Sabri Abdul Manaf (AMANAH)	1,637	14.44%	11,336	1,237	73.83%

== Honours ==
=== Honours of Malaysia ===
- Malaysia
  - Member of the Order of the Defender of the Realm (AMN) (2002)
- Perak
  - Knight Grand Commander of the Order of the Perak State Crown (SPMP) – Dato' Seri (2021)
  - Knight Commander of the Order of Cura Si Manja Kini (DPCM) – Dato' (2004)
  - Member of the Order of the Perak State Crown (AMP) (2000)
  - Recipient of the Meritorious Service Medal (PJK) (1989)
  - Recipient of the Sultan Nazrin Shah Installation Medal (2015)

Political offices
Preceded by Ahmad Faizal Azumu	Menteri Besar of Perak; 2020–present	Incumbent
