= Menteri Besar of Perak =

Head of government in Malaysian state

- Incumbent; Saarani Mohamad since 10 December 2020
- Government of Perak
- Style: Yang Amat Berhormat (The Most Honourable)
- Member of: Perak State Executive Council
- Reports to: Perak State Legislative Assembly
- Residence: Jalan Raja Dihilir, Ipoh, Perak
- Seat: Aras 2, Bangunan Perak Darul Ridzuan, Jalan Panglima Bukit Gantang Wahab, 30000 Ipoh, Perak
- Appointer: Nazrin Muizzuddin Shah; Sultan of Perak
- Term length: 5 years or lesser, renewable once (while commanding the confidence of the Perak State Legislative Assembly With State Elections held no more than five years apart)
- Inaugural holder: Abdul Wahab Toh Muda Abdul Aziz
- Formation: 1 February 1948; 78 years ago
- Website: www.perak.gov.my

The Menteri Besar of Perak or First Minister of Perak is the head of government in the Malaysian state of Perak. According to convention, the Menteri Besar is the leader of the majority party or largest coalition party of the Perak State Legislative Assembly.

The current holder of Menteri Besar of Perak post is Saarani Mohammad, who has served since 10 December 2020.

== Appointment ==
According to the state constitution, the Sultan of Perak shall first appoint the Menteri Besar to preside over the Executive Council and requires such Menteri Besar to be a member of the Legislative Assembly who in his judgment is likely to command the confidence of the majority of the members of the Assembly, must be an ethnic Malay who professes the religion of Islam and must not be a Malaysian citizen by naturalisation or by registration. The Sultan on the Menteri Besar's advice shall appoint not more than ten nor less than four members from among the members of the Legislative Assembly.

The member of the Executive Council must take and subscribe in the presence of the Sultan the oath of office and allegiance as well as the oath of secrecy before they can exercise the functions of office. The Executive Council shall be collectively responsible to the Legislative Assembly. The members of the Executive Council shall not hold any office of profit and engage in any trade, business or profession that will cause conflict of interest.

If a government cannot get its appropriation (budget) legislation passed by the Legislative Assembly, or the Legislative Assembly passes a vote of "no confidence" in the government, the Menteri Besar is bound by convention to resign immediately. The Sultan's choice of replacement Menteri Besar will be dictated by the circumstances. A member of the Executive Council other than the Menteri Besar shall hold office during the pleasure of the Sultan, unless the appointment of any member of the Executive Council shall have been revoked by the Sultan on the advice of the Menteri Besar but may at any time resign his office.

Following a resignation in other circumstances, defeated in an election or the death of the Menteri Besar, the Sultan will generally appoint as Menteri Besar the person voted by the governing party as their new leader.

== Powers ==
The power of the Menteri Besar is subject to a number of limitations. Menteri Besar removed as leader of his or her party, or whose government loses a vote of no confidence in the Legislative Assembly, must advise a state election or resign the office or be dismissed by the Sultan. The defeat of a supply bill (one that concerns the spending of money) or unable to pass important policy-related legislation is seen to require the resignation of the government or dissolution of Legislative Assembly, much like a non-confidence vote, since a government that cannot spend money is hamstrung, also called loss of supply.

The Menteri Besar's party will normally have a majority in the Legislative Assembly and party discipline is exceptionally strong in Perak politics, so passage of the government's legislation through the Legislative Assembly is mostly a formality.

== Caretaker Menteri Besar ==
The legislative assembly unless sooner dissolved by the Sultan with His Majesty's own discretion on the advice of the Menteri Besar shall continue for five years from the date of its first meeting. The state constitution permits a delay of 60 days of general election to be held from the date of dissolution and the legislative assembly shall be summoned to meet on a date not later than 120 days from the date of dissolution. Conventionally, between the dissolution of one legislative assembly and the convening of the next, the Menteri Besar and the executive council remain in office in a caretaker capacity.

== List of Menteris Besar of Perak ==
The following is the list of Menteris Besar of Perak since 1948:

Colour key (for political parties):
UMNO NAP Alliance / Barisan Nasional Pakatan Rakyat Pakatan Harapan Perikatan Nasional

No.	Portrait	Name (Birth–Death) Constituency	Term of office			Party (Note: This column names only the Menteri Besar's party. The state government he heads may be a complex coalition of several parties and independents; those are not listed here.)	Election	Assembly
No.	Portrait	Name (Birth–Death) Constituency	Took office	Left office	Time in office	Party	Election	Assembly
1		Abdul Wahab Toh Muda Abdul Aziz (1905–1959)	1 February 1948	1 August 1957	9 years, 182 days	UMNO	–	–
1		Abdul Wahab Toh Muda Abdul Aziz (1905–1959)	1 February 1948	1 August 1957	9 years, 182 days	Independent	–	–
1		Abdul Wahab Toh Muda Abdul Aziz (1905–1959)	1 February 1948	1 August 1957	9 years, 182 days	NAP	–	–
2		Mohamed Ghazali Jawi (1924–1982); MLC for Larut-South Matang	1 August 1957	16 April 1959	1 year, 259 days	Alliance (UMNO)	–	–
3		Shaari Shafie (1912–1966); MLA for Senggang	16 April 1959	8 May 1964	5 years, 23 days	Alliance (UMNO)	–	–
3		Shaari Shafie (1912–1966); MLA for Senggang	16 April 1959	8 May 1964	5 years, 23 days	Alliance (UMNO)	1959	1st
4		Ahmad Said (1919–1974); MLA for Lenggong	9 May 1964	17 March 1969	4 years, 313 days	Alliance (UMNO)	1964	2nd
5		Kamaruddin Mohd. Isa (1930–1989); MLA for Larut	18 March 1969	4 September 1974	5 years, 171 days	Alliance (UMNO)	1969	3rd
6		Mohamed Ghazali Jawi (1924–1982); MLA for Kenering	4 September 1974	2 October 1977	3 years, 29 days	BN (UMNO)	1974	4th
7		Dato' Seri; Wan Mohamed Wan Teh (1929–1993); MLA for Temengor (1974–1978); MLA for Kenering (1978–1983)	3 October 1977	1 March 1983	5 years, 150 days	BN (UMNO)	–	4th
7		Dato' Seri; Wan Mohamed Wan Teh (1929–1993); MLA for Temengor (1974–1978); MLA for Kenering (1978–1983)	3 October 1977	1 March 1983	5 years, 150 days	BN (UMNO)	1978	5th
7		Dato' Seri; Wan Mohamed Wan Teh (1929–1993); MLA for Temengor (1974–1978); MLA for Kenering (1978–1983)	3 October 1977	1 March 1983	5 years, 150 days	BN (UMNO)	1982	6th
8		Tan Sri Dato' Seri; Ramli Ngah Talib (born 1941); MLA for Kampong Gajah	1 March 1983	3 December 1999	16 years, 278 days	BN (UMNO)	–	6th
8		Tan Sri Dato' Seri; Ramli Ngah Talib (born 1941); MLA for Kampong Gajah	1 March 1983	3 December 1999	16 years, 278 days	BN (UMNO)	1986	7th
8		Tan Sri Dato' Seri; Ramli Ngah Talib (born 1941); MLA for Kampong Gajah	1 March 1983	3 December 1999	16 years, 278 days	BN (UMNO)	1990	8th
8		Tan Sri Dato' Seri; Ramli Ngah Talib (born 1941); MLA for Kampong Gajah	1 March 1983	3 December 1999	16 years, 278 days	BN (UMNO)	1995	9th
9		Tan Sri Dato' Seri DiRaja; Tajol Rosli Mohd Ghazali (born 1946); MLA for Kenering (1999–2004); MLA for Pengkalan Hulu (2004–2008)	3 December 1999	17 March 2008	8 years, 106 days	BN (UMNO)	1999	10th
9		Tan Sri Dato' Seri DiRaja; Tajol Rosli Mohd Ghazali (born 1946); MLA for Kenering (1999–2004); MLA for Pengkalan Hulu (2004–2008)	3 December 1999	17 March 2008	8 years, 106 days	BN (UMNO)	2004	11th
10		Dato' Seri Ir. Mohammad Nizar Jamaluddin (born 1957); MLA for Pasir Panjang	17 March 2008	6 February 2009	327 days	PR (PAS)	2008	12th
11		Dato' Seri DiRaja; Zambry Abdul Kadir (born 1962); MLA for Pangkor	12 May 2009	12 May 2018	9 years, 0 days	BN (UMNO)	–	12th
11		Dato' Seri DiRaja; Zambry Abdul Kadir (born 1962); MLA for Pangkor	12 May 2009	12 May 2018	9 years, 0 days	BN (UMNO)	2013	13th
12		Dato' Seri; Ahmad Faizal Azumu (born 1970); MLA for Chenderiang	12 May 2018	10 March 2020	1 year, 304 days	PH (BERSATU)	2018	14th
12		Dato' Seri; Ahmad Faizal Azumu (born 1970); MLA for Chenderiang	13 March 2020	5 December 2020	268 days	PN (BERSATU)	–	14th
13		Dato' Seri; Saarani Mohamad (born 1962); MLA for Kota Tampan	10 December 2020	Incumbent	5 years, 341 days	BN (UMNO)	–	14th
13		Dato' Seri; Saarani Mohamad (born 1962); MLA for Kota Tampan	10 December 2020	Incumbent	5 years, 341 days	BN (UMNO)	2022	15th

== Living former Menteris Besar ==
Name	Term of office	Date of birth
Ramli Ngah Talib	1983–1999	16 March 1941 (age 85)
Tajol Rosli Mohd Ghazali	1999–2008	6 November 1946 (age 80)
Mohammad Nizar Jamaluddin	2008-2009	17 March 1957 (age 69)
Zambry Abdul Kadir	2009–2018	22 March 1962 (age 64)
Ahmad Faizal Azumu	2018–2020	10 June 1970 (age 56)

== See also ==
- 2009 Perak constitutional crisis
- Dato' Seri Ir Hj. Mohammad Nizar Bin Jamaluddin v. Dato' Dr. Zambry Bin Abd. Kadir
