= 2018 Perak state election =

Malaysian state election

- 9 May 2018

All 59 seats in the Perak State Legislative Assembly 30 seats needed for a majority
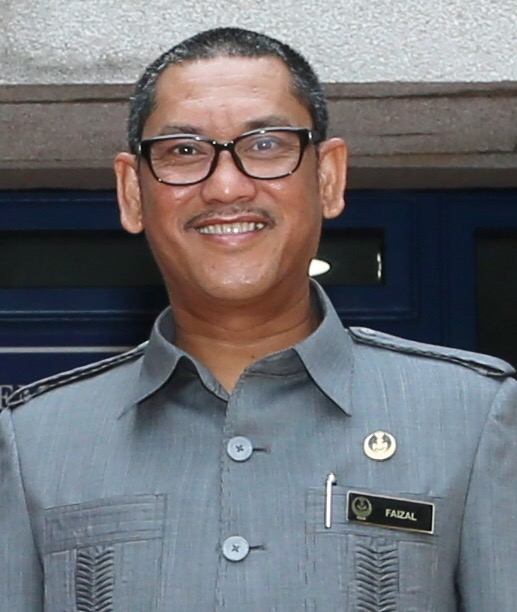

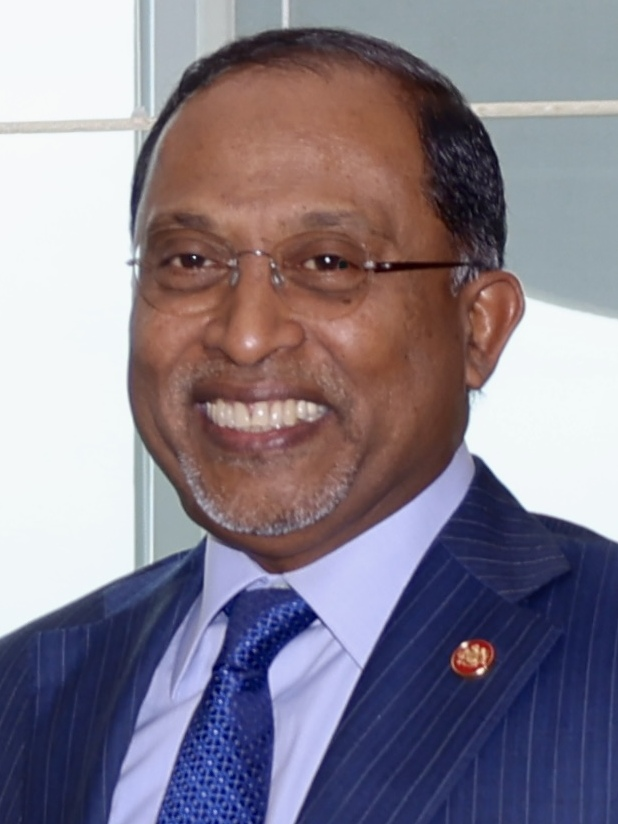
	Majority party	Minority party	Third party
			GS
Leader	Ahmad Faizal Azumu	Dr. Zambry Abd. Kadir	Razman Zakaria
Party	Pakatan Harapan (PPBM)	Barisan Nasional (UMNO)	Gagasan Sejahtera (PAS)
Leader since	30 August 2017	4 March 2004	20 April 2018
Leader's seat	Chenderiang	Pangkor	Gunong Semanggol
Last election	23 seats, 37.14% (Pakatan Rakyat) (Note: Excludes PAS and PSM, which was part of the Pakatan Rakyat coalition in the 2013 election but subsequently left in 2015, resulting in Pakatan Harapan being formed by DAP and PKR, later joined by BERSATU and Amanah for this election. The original number of seats and vote share held by the then Pakatan Rakyat as it was in 2013 was 28 seats and 55.03%, respectively.)	31 seats, 44.40%	5 seats, 17.74% (Pakatan Rakyat) (Note: PAS was previously part of Pakatan Rakyat until 2015, leaving to form Gagasan Sejahtera with BERJASA.)
Seats before	24	31	4
Seats won	29	27	3
Seat change	▲5	▼4	▼1
Popular vote	595,219	395,708	194,735
Percentage	50.07%	33.29%	16.40%
Swing	▲12.93%	▼11.11%	▼1.34%
- Results by constituency
Menteri Besar before election
Zambry Abdul Kadir
BN–UMNO
Elected Menteri Besar
Ahmad Faizal Azumu
PH–BERSATU

The 14th Perak State election was held on 9 May 2018. The previous state election was held on 5 May 2013. Each of the state assemblymen are elected to a five-year term each.

The Perak State Legislative Assembly automatically dissolved on 28 June 2018, the fifth anniversary of the first sitting, and elections were required to be held within sixty days (two months) of the dissolution (on or before 28 August 2018, with the date to be decided by the Election Commission), unless dissolved prior to that date by the Head of State (Sultan of Perak) on the advice of the Head of Government (Menteri Besar of Perak).

Pakatan Harapan (PH) gained a plurality in the election, winning 29 seats but still short of 1 seat for a simple majority win, until 2 MLAs from Barisan Nasional (BN) quit their parties to support PH, enabling it to form the state government. Ahmad Faizal Azumu, from BERSATU, was sworn in as Menteri Besar on 12 May 2018, while the state EXCO members were sworn in on 19 May 2018.

== Contenders ==
Barisan Nasional (BN) contested all 59 seats in Perak State Legislative Assembly. Barisan Nasional (BN) linchpin party United Malays National Organisation (UNMO) contested a major share of Barisan Nasional (BN) seats.

Pakatan Harapan also contested all 59 seats in Perak with Democratic Action Party (DAP) was largest contested 18 seats while National Trust Party (Amanah) contested 13 seats and both People's Justice Party (PKR) and the Malaysian United Indigenous Party (Bersatu) contested 14 seats each. Pakatan Harapan will use PKR logo as its logo for election.

Gagasan Sejahtera contested all 56 seats in Perak. Pan-Malaysian Islamic Party (PAS) competed for 43 seats. The remaining 16 seats were distributed to Parti Cinta Malaysia (PCM).

Parti Sosialis Malaysia (PSM) will contest 5 seats in Buntong, Jelapang, Menglembu, Tronoh and Malim Nawar.

=== Political parties ===
Coalition			Other parties
Incumbent	Opposition		Other parties
Barisan Nasional (BN)	Pakatan Harapan (PH)	Gagasan Sejahtera (GS)	Parti Sosialis Malaysia (PSM); Parti Kesejahteraan Insan Tanah Air (KITA)
United Malays National Organisation (UMNO); Malaysian Chinese Association (MCA); Malaysian Indian Congress (MIC); Parti Gerakan Rakyat Malaysia (Gerakan)	Parti Pribumi Bersatu Malaysia (Bersatu); Democratic Action Party (DAP); Parti Keadilan Rakyat (PKR); Parti Amanah Negara (Amanah)	Parti Islam Malaysia (PAS); Barisan Jemaah Islamiah Se-Malaysia (Berjasa)	Parti Sosialis Malaysia (PSM); Parti Kesejahteraan Insan Tanah Air (KITA)

== The contested seats ==
No.	State constituency	Incumbent State Assemblyman	Political parties							
No.	State constituency	Incumbent State Assemblyman	Barisan Nasional (BN)		Pakatan Harapan (PH)		Gagasan Sejahtera (GS)		Other parties/Ind	
No.	State constituency	Incumbent State Assemblyman	Candidate Name	Party	Candidate Name	Party	Candidate Name	Party	Candidate Name	Party
N01	Pengkalan Hulu	Aznel Ibrahim (BN)	Aznel Ibrahim	UMNO	Dr. Ahmad Safwan Mohamad	Bersatu	Mohd Hamidi Ismail	PAS	—N/a	—N/a
N02	Temengor	Salbiah Mohamed (BN)	Salbiah Mohamed	UMNO	Mohd. Fadzil Abdul Aziz	Bersatu	Md Pozi Md Sani	PAS	—N/a	—N/a
N03	Kenering	Mohd Tarmizi Idris (BN)	Mohd Tarmizi Idris	UMNO	Noor Sham Abu Samah	PKR	Azhar Rasdi	PAS	—N/a	—N/a
N04	Kota Tampan	Saarani Mohamad (BN)	Saarani Mohamad	UMNO	Noor Hasnida Mohd. Hashim	Bersatu	Muhamad Rif’aat Razman	PAS	—N/a	—N/a
N05	Selama	Mohamad Daud Mohd Yusoff (BN)	Faizul Mohd Shohor	UMNO	Razali Ismail	Amanah	Mohd Akmal Kamaruddin	PAS	—N/a	—N/a
N06	Kubu Gajah	Ahmad Hasbullah Alias (BN)	Saliza Ahmad	UMNO	Mat Supri Musa	Bersatu	Khalil Yahaya	PAS	—N/a	—N/a
N07	Batu Kurau	Muhammad Amin Zakaria (BN)	Muhammad Amin Zakaria	UMNO	Muhamad Aiman Aizuddin Md Husin	PKR	Mohd Shahir Mohd Hassan	PAS	Zainal Abidin Abd. Rahman	Berjasa
N08	Titi Serong	Abu Bakar Hussian (PAS)	Norsalewati Mat Norwani	UMNO	Hasnul Zulkarnain Abd Munaim	Amanah	Abu Bakar Hussian	PAS	—N/a	—N/a
N09	Kuala Kurau	Abdul Yunus Jamahri (PH)	Shahrul Nizam Razali	UMNO	Abdul Yunus Jamahri	PKR	Abdul Baharin Mohd Desa	PAS	—N/a	—N/a
N10	Alor Pongsu	Sham Mat Sahat (BN)	Sham Mat Sahat	UMNO	Ahmad Zaki Husin	PKR	Wan Tarmizi Abd Aziz	PAS	—N/a	—N/a
N11	Gunong Semanggol	Mohd Zawawi Abu Hassan (PAS)	Zaini Cha	UMNO	Ismail Ali	Bersatu	Haji Razman Zakaria	PAS	—N/a	—N/a
N12	Selinsing	Husin Din (PAS)	Mohamad Nor Dawoo	UMNO	Ahmad Saqid Ansorullah Ahmad Jihbadz Mokhlis	Amanah	Husin Din	PAS	—N/a	—N/a
N13	Kuala Sepetang	Chua Yee Ling (PH)	Mohd Kamaruddin Abu Bakar	UMNO	Chua Yee Ling	PKR	Rahim Ismail	PAS	—N/a	—N/a
N14	Changkat Jering	Mohammad Nizar Jamaluddin (PH)	Ahmad Saidi Mohamad Daud	UMNO	Megat Shariffuddin Ibrahim	Amanah	Mohd Nordin Jaafar	PAS	P.M. Mohganan	IND
N15	Trong	Zabri Abd Wahid (BN)	Jamilah Zakaria	UMNO	Shaharuddin Abdul Rashid	Bersatu	Muhd Faisal Abd Rahman	PAS	—N/a	—N/a
N16	Kamunting	Mohammad Zahir Abdul Khalid (BN)	Mohammad Zahir Abdul Khalid	UMNO	Muhd Fadhil Nuruddin	Amanah	Mohd Fakhrudin Abd Aziz	PAS	—N/a	—N/a
N17	Pokok Assam	Teh Kok Lim (PH)	Lee Li Kuan	MCA	Leow Thye Yih	DAP	—N/a	—N/a	—N/a	—N/a
N18	Aulong	Leow Thye Yih (PH)	Soo Kay Ping	Gerakan	Nga Kor Ming	DAP	—N/a	—N/a	—N/a	—N/a
N19	Chenderoh	Zainun Mat Noor (BN)	Zainun Mat Noor	UMNO	Khairul Anuar Musa	PKR	Mohd Farid Faizi Azizan	PAS	—N/a	—N/a
N20	Lubok Merbau	Siti Salmah Mat Jusak (BN)	Jurij Jalaluddin	UMNO	Zulkarnine Hashim	Bersatu	Azizi Mohamed Ridzuwan	PAS	—N/a	—N/a
N21	Lintang	Mohd Zolkafly Harun (BN)	Mohd Zolkafly Harun	UMNO	Madhi Hassan	PKR	Isran Fahmi Ismail	PAS	—N/a	—N/a
N22	Jalong	Loh Sze Yee (PH)	Tan Lian Hoe	Gerakan	Loh Sze Yee	DAP	—N/a	—N/a	—N/a	—N/a
N23	Manjoi	Mohamad Ziad Mohamed Zainal Abidin (BN)	Mohamad Ziad Mohamed Zainal Abidin	UMNO	Asmuni Awi	Amanah	Mohd Hafez Sabri	PAS	—N/a	—N/a
N24	Hulu Kinta	Aminuddin Md Hanafiah (BN)	Aminuddin Md Hanafiah	UMNO	Muhamad Arafat Varisai Mahamad	PKR	Mat Salleh Said	PAS	—N/a	—N/a
N25	Canning	Wong Kah Woh (PH)	Liew Kar Tuan	Gerakan	Jenny Choy	DAP	—N/a	—N/a	—N/a	—N/a
N26	Tebing Tinggi	Ong Boon Piow (PH)	Tony Khoo Boon Chuan	MCA	Abdul Aziz Bari	DAP	Mazlan Md Isa	PAS	—N/a	—N/a
N27	Pasir Pinji	Lee Chuan How (PH)	Ng Kai Cheong	MCA	Lee Chuan How	DAP	—N/a	—N/a	—N/a	—N/a
N28	Bercham	Cheong Chee Khing (PH)	Low Guo Nan	MCA	Ong Boon Piow	DAP	—N/a	—N/a	—N/a	—N/a
N29	Kepayang	Nga Kor Ming (PH)	Chang Kok Aun	MCA	Ko Chung Sen	DAP	—N/a	—N/a	—N/a	—N/a
N30	Buntong	Sivasubramaniam Athinarayanan (PH)	T. Thangarani	MIC	Sivasubramaniam Athinarayanan	DAP	—N/a	—N/a	Ramni Rasiah	PSM
N31	Jelapang	Teh Hock Ke (PH)	K. Thankaraj	MIC	Cheah Poh Hian	DAP	—N/a	—N/a	M. Saraswathy	PSM
N32	Menglembu	Lim Pek Har (PH)	Wong Kam Seng	MCA	Chaw Kam Foon	DAP	—N/a	—N/a	Chin Kwai Leong	PSM
N33	Tronoh	Yong Choo Kiong (PH)	Yuen Chan How	MCA	Yong Choo Kiong	DAP	—N/a	—N/a	Andy Chin	PSM
N34	Bukit Chandan	Maslin Sham Razman (BN)	Maslin Sham Razman	UMNO	Mohamad Imran Abdul Hamid	PKR	Intan Noraini Mohd Basir	PAS	Akmal Haikal Azman Shah	KITA
N35	Manong	Mohamad Kamil Shafie (BN)	Mohd Zuraimi Razali	UMNO	Mohamad Isa Jaafar	Bersatu	Jamil Dzulkarnain	PAS	Muhamad Firdaus Izuan	KITA
N36	Pengkalan Baharu	Abd Manaf Hashim (BN)	Abd Manaf Hashim	UMNO	Murad Abdullah	Bersatu	Zakaria Hashim	PAS	—N/a	—N/a
N37	Pantai Remis	Wong May Ing (PH)	Ho Kean Wei	MCA	Wong May Ing	DAP	—N/a	—N/a	—N/a	—N/a
N38	Astaka (previously known as Sitiawan)	Ngeh Koo Ham (PH)	Teng Keek Soong	MCA	Teoh Yee Chow	DAP	—N/a	—N/a	—N/a	—N/a
N39	Belanja	Mohd Nizar Zakaria (BN)	Khairudin Abu Hanipah	UMNO	Yahanis Yahya	Bersatu	Mohd Zahid Abu Bakar	PAS	—N/a	—N/a
N40	Bota	Nasarudin Hashim (BN)	Khairul Shahril Mohamed	UMNO	Azrul Hakkim Azhar	Bersatu	Muhamad Ismi Mat Taib	PAS	—N/a	—N/a
N41	Malim Nawar	Leong Cheok Keng (PH)	Chang Gwo Chyang	MCA	Leong Cheok Keng	DAP	—N/a	—N/a	K.S. Bawani	PSM
N42	Keranji	Chen Fook Chye (PH)	Daniel Wa How	MCA	Chang Zhemin	DAP	—N/a	—N/a	—N/a	—N/a
N43	Tualang Sekah	Nolee Ashilin Mohamed Radzi (BN)	Nolee Ashilin Mohamed Radzi	UMNO	Mohd Azlan Helmi	PKR	Mohd Sofian Rejab	PAS	—N/a	—N/a
N44	Sungai Rapat	Radzi Zainon (PAS)	Hamzah Kasim	UMNO	Mohammad Nizar Jamaluddin	Amanah	Radzi Zainon	PAS	—N/a	—N/a
N45	Simpang Pulai	Tan Kar Hing (PH)	Liew Yee Lin	MCA	Tan Kar Hing	PKR	—N/a	—N/a	—N/a	—N/a
N46	Teja	Chang Lih Kang (PH)	Chang Chun Cheun	MCA	Ng Shy Ching	PKR	Mokhthar Abdullah	PAS	—N/a	—N/a
N47	Chenderiang	Mah Hang Soon (BN)	Chong Shin Heng	MCA	Ahmad Faizal Azumu	Bersatu	Nordin Hassan	PAS	—N/a	—N/a
N48	Ayer Kuning	Samsudin Abu Hassan (BN)	Samsudin Abu Hassan	UMNO	Tan Seng Toh	Amanah	Salmah Ab Latif	PAS	—N/a	—N/a
N49	Sungai Manik	Zainol Fadzi Paharudin (BN)	Zainol Fadzi Paharudin	UMNO	Mohamad Maharani Md Tasi	PKR	Mohamed Yusoff Abdullah	PAS	Mustapa Kamal Maulut	Berjasa
N50	Kampong Gajah	Abdullah Fauzi Ahmad Razali (BN)	Wan Norashikin Wan Nordin	UMNO	Zaiton Latiff	Amanah	Mustafa Shaari	PAS	—N/a	—N/a
N51	Pasir Panjang	Rashidi Ibrahim (BN)	Rashidi Ibrahim	UMNO	Yahaya Mat Nor	Amanah	Rohawati Abidin	PAS	—N/a	—N/a
N52	Pangkor	Zambry Abdul Kadir (BN)	Zambry Abdul Kadir	UMNO	Nordin Ahmad Ismail	Bersatu	Zainal Abidin Saad	PAS	—N/a	—N/a
N53	Rungkup	Shahrul Zaman Yahya (BN)	Shahrul Zaman Yahya	UMNO	Hatim Musa	Amanah	Mohd Mohkheri Jalil	PAS	—N/a	—N/a
N54	Hutan Melintang	Kesavan Subramaniam (PH)	Khairuddin Tarmizi	UMNO	Manivannan Gowindasamy	PKR	Mohd Misbahul Munir Masduki	PAS	—N/a	—N/a
N55	Pasir Bedamar	Terence Naidu (PH)	Kong Sun Chin	MCA	Terence Naidu	DAP	S. Kumaresan	PAS	—N/a	—N/a
N56	Changkat Jong	Mohd Azhar Jamaluddin (BN)	Mohd Azhar Jamaluddin	UMNO	Muhammad Faizul Mohamed Ismail	Bersatu	Mohd Azhar Mohd Rafiei	PAS	—N/a	—N/a
N57	Sungkai	Sivanesan Achalingam (DAP)	V. Elango	MIC	Sivanesan Achalingam	DAP	J. Applasamy	PAS	—N/a	—N/a
N58	Slim	Mohd Khusairi Abdul Talib (BN)	Mohd Khusairi Abdul Talib	UMNO	Mohd. Amran Ibrahim	Bersatu	Muhammad Zulfadli Zainal	PAS	—N/a	—N/a
N59	Behrang	Rusnah Kassim (BN)	Rusnah Kassim	UMNO	Aminuddin Zulkipli	Amanah	Syed Zamzuri Syed Nengah	PAS	—N/a	—N/a

== Election pendulum ==
The 14th General Election witnessed 29 governmental seats (2 from non-governmental seats were later decided to support the creation of new state government) and 30 non-governmental seats (currently 28 seats after 2 of them decided to support new government) filled the Perak State Legislative Assembly. The government side has 18 safe seat and 1 fairly safe seat. However, none of the non-government side has safe and fairly safe seat.

2018 Perak state election

GOVERNMENT SEATS
Marginal
Titi Serong	Hasnul Zulkarnain Abd. Munaim	AMANAH	34.46
Pasir Panjang	Yahaya Mat Nor	AMANAH	40.56
Kuala Kurau	Abdul Junus Jamhari	PKR	41.88
Manjoi	Asmuni Awi	AMANAH	42.30
Kamunting	Ir. Dr. Muhd. Fadhil Nuruddin	AMANAH	42.50
Behrang	Aminuddin Zulkipli	AMANAH	43.49
Hulu Kinta	Muhammad Arafat Varisai Muhamad	PKR	45.02
Chenderiang	Ahmad Faizal Azumu	BERSATU	45.02
Sungai Rapat	Ir. Mohamad Nizar Jamaluddin	AMANAH	48.04
Tebing Tinggi	Dr. Abdul Aziz Bari	DAP	49.99
Fairly safe
Teja	Sandrea Ng Shy Ching	PKR	56.31
Safe
Malim Nawar	Leong Cheok Keng	DAP	67.60
Jalong	Loh Sze Yee	DAP	71.17
Sungkai	Sivanesan Achalingam	DAP	72.56
Simpang Pulai	Tan Kar Hing	PKR	73.97
Aulong	David Nga Kor Ming	DAP	74.94
Keranji	Chang Zhemin	DAP	74.97
Tronoh	Yong Choo Kiong	DAP	75.48
Pasir Bedamar	Terence Naidu Raja Naidu	DAP	76.76
Pokok Assam	Leow Thye Yih	DAP	77.50
Pantai Remis	Wong May Ing	DAP	77.86
Kepayang	Dr. Ko Chung Sen	DAP	80.95
Buntong	Sivasubramaniam Athinarayanan	DAP	83.74
Astaka	Teoh Yee Chern	DAP	83.80
Bercham	Ong Boon Piow	DAP	86.22
Jelapang	Cheah Poh Hian	DAP	86.27
Canning	Jenny Choy Tsi Jen	DAP	87.72
Menglembu	Chaw Kam Foon	DAP	88.13
Pasir Pinji	Howard Lee Chuan How	DAP	90.56

NON-GOVERNMENT SEATS
Marginal
Lubok Merbau	Jurij Jalaluddin	UMNO	36.13
Selinsing	Mohamad Noor Dawoo	UMNO	36.25
Kuala Sepetang	Mohd. Kamaruddin Abu Bakar	UMNO	37.54
Manong	Mohd. Zuraimi Razali	UMNO	39.25
Alor Pongsu	Sham Mat Sahat	UMNO	39.63
Changkat Jong	Mohd. Azhar Jamaluddin	UMNO	39.77
Changkat Jering	Ahmad Saidi Mohamad Daud	UMNO	40.13
Selama	Mohd. Akmal Kamaruddin	PAS	41.28
Bukit Chandan	Maslin Sham Razman	UMNO	41.94
Bota	Khairul Shahril Mohamed	UMNO	43.42
Kubu Gajah	Khalil Yahaya	PAS	44.29
Sungai Manik	Zainol Fadzi Paharudin	UMNO	44.48
Pangkor	Dr. Zambry Abd. Kadir	UMNO	44.64
Tualang Sekah	Nolee Ashilin Mohammed Radzi Manan	UMNO	44.74
Slim	Mohd. Khusairi Abdul Talib	UMNO	44.83
Hutan Melintang	Khairuddin Tarmizi	UMNO	45.05
Gunong Semanggol	Razman Zakaria	PAS	45.10
Pengkalan Baharu	Abd. Manap Hashim	UMNO	45.80
Batu Kurau	Dr. Muhammad Amin Hj. Zakaria	UMNO	47.01
Trong	Jamilah Zakaria	UMNO	47.03
Chenderoh	Zainun Mat Noor	UMNO	47.54
Ayer Kuning	Samsudin Abu Hassan	UMNO	47.64
Pengkalan Hulu	Aznel Ibrahim	UMNO	48.57
Kampong Gajah	Dr. Wan Norashikin Wan Noordin	UMNO	48.86
Belanja	Khairudin Abu Hanipah	UMNO	49.40
Temenggor	Salbiah Mohamed	UMNO	50.42
Kota Tampan	Saarani Mohamad	UMNO	52.36
Rungkup	Shahrul Zaman Yahya	UMNO	52.57
Lintang	Mohd. Zolkafly Harun	UMNO	52.79
Kenering	Mohd. Tarmizi Idris	UMNO	55.39

== Results ==
Party or alliance		Votes	%	Seats	+/–
Pakatan Harapan	Democratic Action Party	361,521	30.41	18	0
Pakatan Harapan	National Trust Party	101,773	8.56	6	New
Pakatan Harapan	Malaysian United Indigenous Party	69,299	5.83	1	New
Pakatan Harapan	People's Justice Party	62,626	5.27	4	–1
Pakatan Harapan	Total	595,219	50.07	29	+6
Barisan Nasional	United Malays National Organisation	303,022	25.49	27	–3
Barisan Nasional	Malaysian Chinese Association	69,542	5.85	0	–1
Barisan Nasional	Parti Gerakan Rakyat Malaysia	15,571	1.31	0	0
Barisan Nasional	Malaysian Indian Congress	7,573	0.64	0	0
Barisan Nasional	Total	395,708	33.29	27	–4
Gagasan Sejahtera	Malaysian Islamic Party	194,735	16.38	3	–2
Gagasan Sejahtera	Pan-Malaysian Islamic Front	211	0.02	0	0
Gagasan Sejahtera	Total	194,946	16.40	3	–2
Socialist Party of Malaysia		2,551	0.21	0	0
Independents		277	0.02	0	0
Total		1,188,701	100.00	59	0
Valid votes		1,188,701	98.38		
Invalid/blank votes		19,564	1.62		
Total votes		1,208,265	100.00		
Registered voters/turnout		1,510,864	79.97		
Source: SPR

=== Seats that changed allegiance ===
No.	Seat	Previous Party (2013)	Current Party (2018)
N05	(Perak) Selama	Barisan Nasional (UMNO)	Gagasan Sejahtera (PAS)
N06	(Perak) Kubu Gajah	Barisan Nasional (UMNO)	Gagasan Sejahtera (PAS)
N08	(Perak) Titi Serong	Gagasan Sejahtera (PAS)	Pakatan Harapan (AMANAH)
N12	(Perak) Selinsing	Gagasan Sejahtera (PAS)	Barisan Nasional (UMNO)
N13	(Perak) Kuala Sepetang	Pakatan Harapan (PKR)	Barisan Nasional (UMNO)
N14	(Perak) Changkat Jering	Gagasan Sejahtera (PAS)	Barisan Nasional (UMNO)
N16	(Perak) Kamunting	Barisan Nasional (UMNO)	Pakatan Harapan (AMANAH)
N23	(Perak) Manjoi	Barisan Nasional (UMNO)	Pakatan Harapan (AMANAH)
N24	(Perak) Hulu Kinta	Barisan Nasional (UMNO)	Pakatan Harapan (PKR)
N44	(Perak) Sungai Rapat	Gagasan Sejahtera (PAS)	Pakatan Harapan (AMANAH)
N47	(Perak) Chenderiang	Barisan Nasional (MCA)	Pakatan Harapan (BERSATU)
N51	(Perak) Pasir Panjang	Barisan Nasional (UMNO)	Pakatan Harapan (AMANAH)
N54	(Perak) Hutan Melintang	Pakatan Harapan (PKR)	Barisan Nasional (UMNO)
N59	(Perak) Behrang	Barisan Nasional (UMNO)	Pakatan Harapan (AMANAH)

== Aftermath ==
Two MLAs from BN who stated their support for PH, Zainol Fadzi Paharudin and Nolee Ashilin Mohammed Radzi, despite their insistence they are not quitting the party for supporting PH, were automatically sacked by UMNO and BN on 14 May 2018. They both later joined Bersatu.

The Pakatan Harapan state government led by Ahmad Faizal only lasts 22 months, when in the wake of 2020 Malaysian political crisis and exit of Bersatu MLAs from PH resulted in a new state government under a coalition between BN and Perikatan Nasional (Bersatu and PAS) in March 2020, with Ahmad Faizal re-appointed as Menteri Besar. That government, in turn only lasted another 9 months before Ahmad Faizal lost a vote of confidence motion tabled by BN, resulting in his resignation and another new government formed and led by BN's Saarani Mohammad in December 2020.
