= 2013 Perak state election =

State election in Malaysia

- 5 May 2013

59 seats to the Perak State Legislative Assembly 30 seats needed for a majority
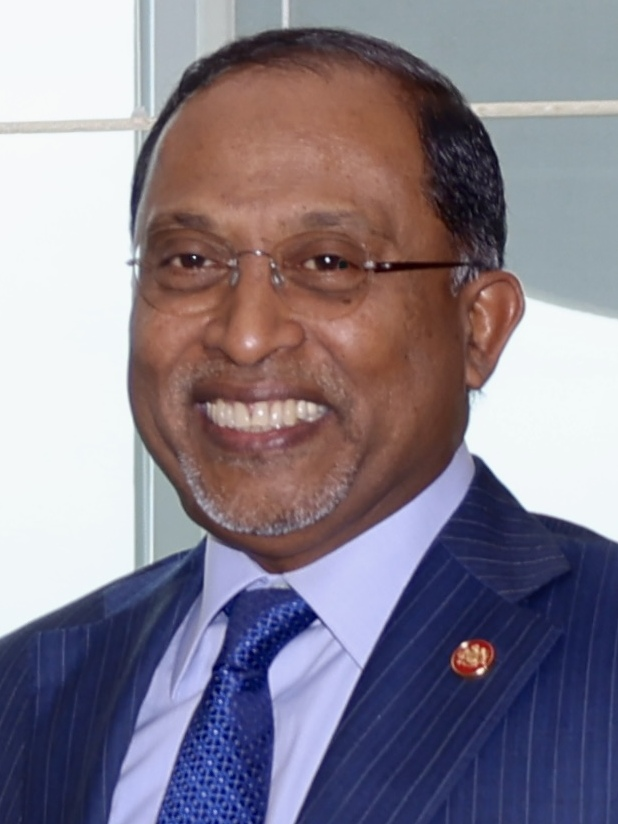
	Majority party	Minority party
Leader	Zambry Abdul Kadir	Mohammad Nizar Jamaluddin
Party	UMNO	PAS
Alliance	Barisan Nasional	Pakatan Rakyat
Leader's seat	Pangkor	Pasir Panjang (ran in Changkat Jering, won)
Last election	28 seats, 47.38% (Note: All the figures of votes and seats are a combined result of all the component parties in BN.)	31 seats, 52.43%
Seats before	29	27
Seats won	31	28
Seat change	▲3	▼3
Popular vote	506,947	628,278
Percentage	44.40%	55.03%
Swing	▼2.98 pp	▲2.60 pp
Menteri Besar before election
Zambry Abdul Kadir
Barisan Nasional (UMNO)
Elected Menteri Besar
Zambry Abdul Kadir
Barisan Nasional (UMNO)

The 13th Perak state election was held on 5 May 2013. Polling took place in 59 constituencies throughout the State of Perak, with each electing a State Assemblyman to the Perak State Legislative Assembly. The election was conducted by the Malaysian Election Commission. The state election was held concurrently with the 2013 Malaysian general election.

Barisan Nasional (BN), having regained the state government control in the controversial 2009 Perak constitutional crisis after their loss in the 2008 election, narrowly retains the government after winning 31 of the 59 seats. Pakatan Rakyat (PR), the informal coalition of Democratic Action Party (DAP), Parti Islam Se-Malaysia (PAS) and Parti Keadilan Rakyat (PKR), won the remaining 28 seats to become the main opposition.

This election is the only time the DAP-PAS-PKR coalition is referred as Pakatan Rakyat during the Perak state election campaign (although each party is contesting using their own name and logo), and also the final Perak state election which the three parties works as a coalition; PR splits in 2015 due to disagreements between DAP and PAS.

== Background ==
=== Political parties ===
Coalition		Other parties
Incumbent	Opposition	Other parties
Pakatan Rakyat	Barisan Nasional	Pan-Malaysian Islamic Front (BERJASA)
Democratic Action Party (DAP); People's Justice Party (PKR); Malaysian Islamic Party (PAS)	United Malays National Organisation (UMNO); Parti Gerakan Rakyat Malaysia (Gerakan); Malaysian Chinese Association (MCA); Malaysian Indian Congress (MIC); People's Progressive Party (myPPP)	Pan-Malaysian Islamic Front (BERJASA)

== Results ==
Party or alliance		Votes	%	Seats	+/–
Barisan Nasional	United Malays National Organisation	357,800	31.34	30	+3
Barisan Nasional	Malaysian Chinese Association	94,272	8.26	1	0
Barisan Nasional	Parti Gerakan Rakyat Malaysia	31,049	2.72	0	0
Barisan Nasional	Malaysian Indian Congress	18,003	1.58	0	0
Barisan Nasional	People's Progressive Party	5,823	0.51	0	0
Barisan Nasional	Total	506,947	44.40	31	+3
Pakatan Rakyat	Democratic Action Party	270,137	23.66	18	0
Pakatan Rakyat	Pan-Malaysian Islamic Party	201,714	17.67	5	–1
Pakatan Rakyat	People's Justice Party	153,859	13.48	5	–2
Pakatan Rakyat	Socialist Party of Malaysia	2,568	0.22	0	0
Pakatan Rakyat	Total	628,278	55.03	28	-3
Pan-Malaysian Islamic Front		783	0.07	0	0
Independents		5,771	0.51	0	0
Total		1,141,779	100.00	59	0
Valid votes		1,141,779	98.12		
Invalid/blank votes		21,830	1.88		
Total votes		1,163,609	100.00		
Registered voters/turnout		1,406,734	82.72		

== Aftermath ==
Zambry was reappointed as Menteri Besar in a swearing-in ceremony in front of the Regent of Perak, Raja Dr Nazrin Shah on 7 May.

In 2015, the PR coalition was disbanded, due to disagreements between PAS and DAP over the former's insistence to implement the Islamic penal code, known as hudud, in the State of Kelantan. Also in 2015, a group of progressives in PAS led by Mohamad Sabu exits the party after losing in the party election, later forming National Trust Party (Amanah). Amanah joined forces with DAP and PKR in forming a successor coalition to PR, later known as Pakatan Harapan (PH) after the splinter party of UMNO, Malaysian United Indigenous Party (PPBM) joined the coalition in 2017.

As a result of the PR split, the coalition's successor, the PH, saw their seat reduced to 23 seats in the Perak Assembly, but later increased to 24 prior to the 2018 state election after MLA for Changkat Jering, Mohammad Nizar Jamaluddin exits PAS to join Amanah, while PAS as a single party retained 4 seats as a result of Nizar's defection.
