= 2022 Perak state election =

Malaysian state election

- 19 November 2022

All 59 seats to the Perak State Legislative Assembly 30 seats needed for a majority
- Registered: 2,036,872
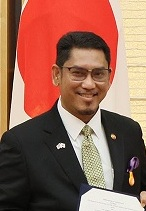

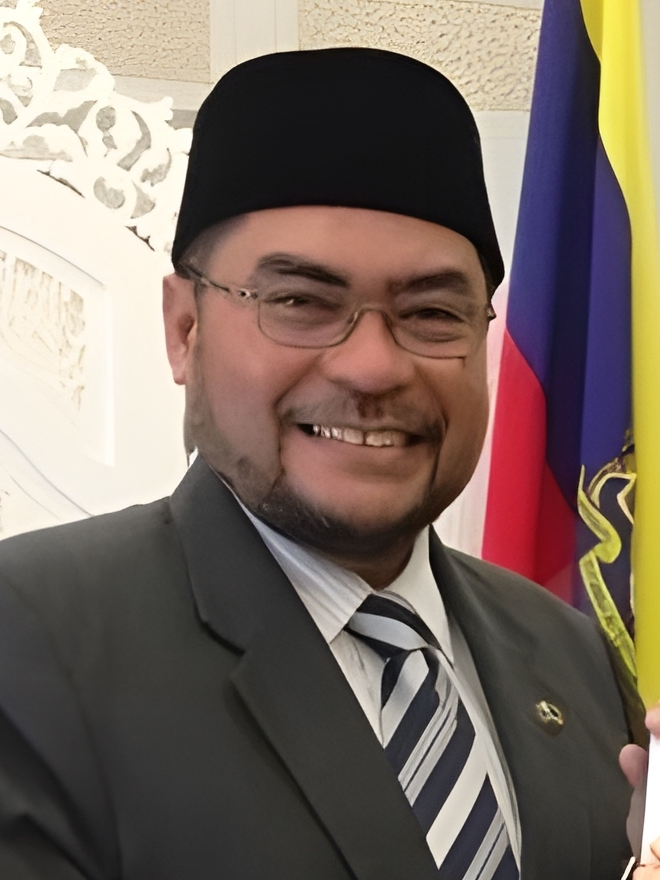

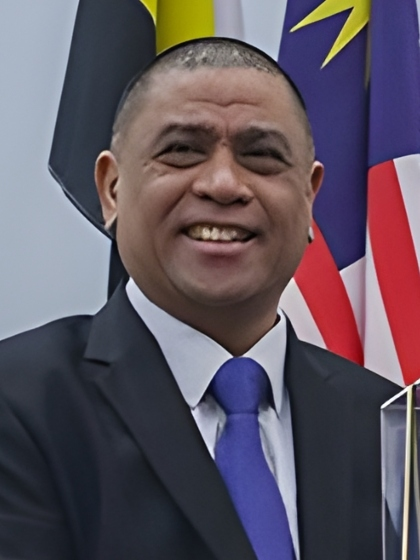
	Majority party	Minority party	Third party
Leader	Ahmad Faizal Azumu	Mujahid Yusof Rawa	Saarani Mohamad
Party	BERSATU	AMANAH	UMNO
Alliance	Perikatan Nasional	Pakatan Harapan	Barisan Nasional
Leader since	23 February 2020	1 June 2021	10 December 2020
Leader's seat	Chenderiang (not seeking re-election)	Did not run (MP for Parit Buntar)	Kota Tampan
Last election	4 seats, 23.52% (Note: New coalition formed in 2020. These numbers are the total seats and vote share of BERSATU, PAS and GERAKAN in the last election. The parties were previously part of Pakatan Harapan, Gagasan Sejahtera and Barisan Nasional.)	28 seats, 44.24% (Note: Excludes BERSATU, which was part of the coalition in the 2018 election but subsequently left and later joined Perikatan Nasional in 2020. The original number of seats and vote share held by Pakatan Harapan as it was in 2018 is 29 seats and 50.07%, respectively.)	27 seats, 31.98% (Note: Total seats and vote share of the parties currently in Barisan Nasional (UMNO, MCA and MIC). The total seats and vote share of Barisan Nasional as it was in the last election was 27 seats and 33.30%, respectively.)
Seats before	8	23	25
Seats won	26	24	9
Seat change	▲22	▼4	▼18
Popular vote	455,734	632,885	380,816
Percentage	30.73%	42.68%	25.68%
Swing	▲7.21 pp	▼1.56 pp	▼6.30 pp
- Results by constituency
Menteri Besar before election
Saarani Mohammad
BN–PN coalition
Elected Menteri Besar
Saarani Mohammad
BN–PH coalition

The 2022 Perak state election, formally the 15th Perak state election, took place on 19 November 2022. This election was to elect 59 members of the 15th Perak State Legislative Assembly. The previous assembly was dissolved on 17 October 2022.

The results of the election resulted in a hung assembly, Perikatan Nasional (PN) won 26 seats, Pakatan Harapan (PH) won 24 while the incumbent Barisan Nasional (BN) which led the administration before election, only won 9.

However, two days after the election, caretaker Menteri Besar Saarani Mohammad was reappointed to the position and the state government was formed on 21 November 2022 after the agreement of BN and PH to form the coalition government. They achieved the support of 33 MLAs - 24 from PH and 9 from BN. This saw the historic first political cooperation between BN and PH, which were bitter political rivals before this. A day after this, the other members of the state government, namely the members of the Perak State Executive Council, (EXCO) were also appointed consisting of 3 MLAs of BN and 7 MLAs of PH.

== Constituencies ==
Map of constituencies to be contested

== Demographics ==
Ethnic breakdown of Perak state's electorate as of 2022
1. Malay (47.9%)
2. Chinese (33.7%)
3. Indian (12.0%)
4. Other ethnicities (6.40%)

== Outgoing members of the assembly ==
The following members of the 14th State Legislative Assembly did not participate in this election.

No.	State Constituency	Departing MLA	Party	Date confirmed	First elected	Reason
N33	Tronoh	Yong Choo Kiong	PBM	27 July 2022	2013	Taking a break from politics to appeal prison sentence by High Court
N08	Titi Serong	Hasnul Zulkarnain Abdul Munaim	IND	11 October 2022	2018	Retired from politics
N29	Kepayang	Ko Chung Sen	PH (DAP)	18 October 2022	2018	Retired from politics
N38	Astaka	Teoh Yee Chern	PH (DAP)	27 October 2022	2018	Retired from politics
N59	Behrang	Aminuddin Zulkipli	PH (AMANAH)	28 October 2022	2018	Not selected by party
N55	Pasir Bedamar	Terence Naidu	PH (DAP)	28 October 2022	2013	Not selected by party
N27	Pasir Pinji	Lee Chuan How	PH (DAP)	28 October 2022	2013	Transferred to Ipoh Timor
N42	Keranji	Chong Zhemin	PH (DAP)	28 October 2022	2018	Transferred to Kampar
N45	Simpang Pulai	Tan Kar Hing	PH (PKR)	3 November 2022	2018	Transferred to Gopeng
N47	Chenderiang	Ahmad Faizal Azumu	PN (BERSATU)	23 October 2022	2018	Not contesting state seat
N03	Kenering	Mohd Tarmizi Idris	BN (UMNO)	2 November 2022	2004	Dropped by party
N07	Batu Kurau	Muhammad Amin Zakaria	BN (UMNO)	2 November 2022	2013	Dropped by party
N19	Chenderoh	Zainun Mat Noor	BN (UMNO)	2 November 2022	2013	Dropped by party
N20	Lubok Merbau	Jurij Jalaluddin	BN (UMNO)	2 November 2022	2018	Dropped by party
N34	Bukit Chandan	Maslin Sham Razman	BN (UMNO)	2 November 2022	2013	Transferred to Kuala Kangsar
N35	Manong	Mohamad Zuraimi Razali	BN (UMNO)	2 November 2022	2018	Dropped by party
N36	Pengkalan Baharu	Abdul Manaf Hashim	BN (UMNO)	2 November 2022	2013	Dropped by party
N48	Ayer Kuning	Samsudin Abu Hassan	BN (UMNO)	2 November 2022	2004	Dropped by party
N52	Pangkor	Zambry Abdul Kadir	BN (UMNO)	2 November 2022	2004	Transferred to Lumut

== Electoral candidates ==
No.	Parliamentary Constituency	No.	State Constituency	Incumbent State Assemblymen	Coalition (Party)	Political coalitions and parties													
No.	Parliamentary Constituency	No.	State Constituency	Incumbent State Assemblymen	Coalition (Party)	Barisan Nasional		Pakatan Harapan		Perikatan Nasional		Gerakan Tanah Air (informal coalition)		Other parties/Independents					
No.	Parliamentary Constituency	No.	State Constituency	Incumbent State Assemblymen	Coalition (Party)	Candidate name	Party	Candidate name	Party	Candidate name	Party	Candidate name	Party	Candidate name	Party	Candidate name	Party	Candidate name	Party
P54	Gerik	N01	Pengkalan Hulu	Aznel Ibrahim	BN (UMNO)	Aznel Ibrahim	UMNO	Mohd Saad Ismail	AMANAH	Mohamad Amin Roslan	PAS								
P54	Gerik	N02	Temengor	Salbiah Mohamed	BN (UMNO)	Salbiah Mohamed	UMNO	Ahmad Safwan Mohamad	PKR	Mohd Noor Abdul Rahman	PAS								
P55	Lenggong	N03	Kenering	Mohd Tarmizi Idris	BN (UMNO)	Rohaida Mohamad Yaakub	UMNO	Mohamad Jamean Zulkepli	PKR	Husairi Ariffin	PAS								
P55	Lenggong	N04	Kota Tampan	Saarani Mohamad	BN (UMNO)	Saarani Mohamad	UMNO	Mohd Sabri Abdul Manaf	AMANAH	Mohd Jamil Yahya	PAS								
P56	Larut	N05	Selama	Mohd Akmal Kamaruddin	PN (PAS)	Faizul Rizal Zulkifli	UMNO	Razali Ismail	AMANAH	Mohd Akmal Kamaruddin	PAS			Osman Sidek	IND				
P56	Larut	N06	Kubu Gajah	Khalil Yahaya	PN (PAS)	Osman Ahmad	UMNO	Mohd Nazri Din	AMANAH	Khalil Yahaya	PAS	Fuaddin Kamaruddin	PEJUANG						
P56	Larut	N07	Batu Kurau	Muhammad Amin Zakaria	BN (UMNO)	Saliza Ahmad	UMNO	Muhamad Aiman Aizuddin Md Husin	PKR	Mohd Najmuddin Elias Al-Hafiz	BERSATU	Zulkifli Yahya	PEJUANG						
P57	Parit Buntar	N08	Titi Serong	Hasnul Zulkarnain Abdul Munaim	IND	Shahrul Nizam Razali	UMNO	Muhammad Nakhaie Wahab	AMANAH	Hakimi Hamzi Hayat	PAS								
P57	Parit Buntar	N09	Kuala Kurau	Abdul Yunus Jamahri	PN (BERSATU)	Mohd Jamil Jahaya	UMNO	Anuar Ahmad	PKR	Abdul Yunus Jamahri	BERSATU								
P58	Bagan Serai	N10	Alor Pongsu	Sham Mat Sahat	BN (UMNO)	Sham Mat Sahat	UMNO	Khairul Azman Ahmad	PKR	Noor Azman Ghazali	BERSATU								
P58	Bagan Serai	N11	Gunong Semanggol	Razman Zakaria	PN (PAS)	Nazirul Jalamuddin	UMNO	Sheikh Khuzaifah Sheikh Abu Bakar	AMANAH	Razman Zakaria	PAS								
P58	Bagan Serai	N12	Selinsing	Mohamad Noor Dawoo	BN (UMNO)	Mohamad Noor Dawoo	UMNO	Ahmad Shaqif Ansarallah Ahmad Jihbaz Mokhlis	AMANAH	Sallehuddin Abdullah	PAS								
P59	Bukit Gantang	N13	Kuala Sepetang	Mohd Kamaruddin Abu Bakar	BN (UMNO)	Mohd Kamaruddin Abu Bakar	UMNO	Zainal Azman Abu Seman	PKR	Ahmad Man	BERSATU	Norhaliza'awayati Meman	PEJUANG						
P59	Bukit Gantang	N14	Changkat Jering	Ahmad Saidi Mohamad Daud	BN (UMNO)	Ahmad Saidi Mohamad Daud	UMNO	Megat Shariffudin Ibrahim	AMANAH	Rahim Ismail	PAS	Nazar Talib	PEJUANG						
P59	Bukit Gantang	N15	Trong	Jamilah Zakaria	BN (UMNO)	Jamilah Zakaria	UMNO	Junaida Jamaludin	PKR	Faisal Abdul Rahman	PAS	Mustafaa Kamal	PEJUANG						
P60	Taiping	N16	Kamunting	Muhd Fadhil Nuruddin	PH (AMANAH)	Ahmad Shalimin Ahmad Shaffie	UMNO	Muhd Fadhil Nuruddin	AMANAH	Mohd Fakhruddin Abdul Aziz	PAS								
P60	Taiping	N17	Pokok Assam	Leow Thye Yih	PH (DAP)	Ang Sui Eng	MCA	Ong Seng Guan	DAP	Shariful Juhari Abu Kassim	BERSATU			Leow Thye Yih	IND	Mohd Yusoff Abdull Hamid	IND		
P60	Taiping	N18	Aulong	Nga Kor Ming	PH (DAP)	G Shanmugiavalloo	MIC	Teh Kok Lim	DAP	Koay Boon Hui	GERAKAN			Lee Seng Yap	IND	Abu Bakar Abdul Rahman	IND		
P61	Padang Rengas	N19	Chenderoh	Zainun Mat Noor	BN (UMNO)	Khairuddin Mohamed Azahari	UMNO	Mohd Khairul Iwan Mat Khairi	PKR	Syed Lukman Hakim Syed Mohd Zin	BERSATU	Ahmad Rodzi Abdul Rahim	PEJUANG						
P61	Padang Rengas	N20	Lubok Merbau	Jurij Jalaluddin	BN (UMNO)	Mohamad Azir Ismail	UMNO	Zaiton Latiff	AMANAH	Azizi Mohamed Ridzuan	PAS								
P62	Sungai Siput	N21	Lintang	Mohd Zolkafly Harun	BN (UMNO)	Mohd Zolkafly Harun	UMNO	Za'im Sidqi Zulkifly	PKR	Ahmad Daslie Osman	BERSATU								
P62	Sungai Siput	N22	Jalong	Loh Sze Yee	PH (DAP)	Pan Chean Chang	MCA	Loh Sze Yee	DAP	Naran Singh Asa Singh	GERAKAN			R Indrani	IND				
P63	Tambun	N23	Manjoi	Asmuni Awi	PH (AMANAH)	Azizul Kama Abd Aziz	UMNO	Asmuni Awi	AMANAH	Hafez Sabri	PAS								
P63	Tambun	N24	Hulu Kinta	Muhamad Arafat Varisai Mahamad	PH (PKR)	Mazlan Abdul Rahman	UMNO	Muhamad Arafat Varisai Mahamad	PKR	Puteri Holijah Muhamad Rali	BERSATU			Murugiah Subramaniam	IND				
P64	Ipoh Timor	N25	Canning	Jenny Choy Tsi Jen	PH (DAP)	Woo Kok Toong	MCA	Jenny Choy Tsi Jen	DAP	Pang Boon Yang	GERAKAN								
P64	Ipoh Timor	N26	Tebing Tinggi	Abdul Aziz Bari	PH (DAP)	Khoo Boon Chuan	MCA	Abdul Aziz Bari	DAP	Mohammad Iskandar Abdul Rahman	BERSATU	Mior Nor Haidir Suhaimi	PEJUANG						
P64	Ipoh Timor	N27	Pasir Pinji	Lee Chuan How	PH (DAP)	Soo Poh Yeow	MCA	Goh See Hua	DAP	Lam Kin Yip	GERAKAN								
P65	Ipoh Barat	N28	Bercham	Ong Boon Piow	PH (DAP)	Hoo Wai Mun	MCA	Ong Boon Piow	DAP	Lim Jin Sheng	GERAKAN								
P65	Ipoh Barat	N29	Kepayang	Ko Chung Sen	PH (DAP)	Lim Huey Shan	MCA	Nga Kor Ming	DAP	Richard Ng	BERSATU								
P65	Ipoh Barat	N30	Buntong	Sivasubramaniam Athinarayanan	PN (BERSATU)	MS Jayagopi	MIC	Thulsi Thivani Manogaran	DAP	Sivasubramaniam Athinarayanan	BERSATU			Iruthiyam Sebastiar Anthonisamy	IND	Muhammad Faiz Abdullah	IND		
P66	Batu Gajah	N31	Jelapang	Cheah Pou Hian	PH (DAP)	Hamidah Muhamad	MMSP	Cheah Pou Hian	DAP	Kalidass Maharajah	PAS								
P66	Batu Gajah	N32	Menglembu	Chaw Kam Foon	PH (DAP)	Phon Kai Mun	MCA	Chaw Kam Foon	DAP	Wong Kean Rong	BERSATU								
P66	Batu Gajah	N33	Tronoh	Paul Yong Choo Kiong	PBM	Leong Chee Wai	MCA	Tiw Tee Siang	DAP	Sin Koon Yen	GERAKAN	Roslan Ismail	PEJUANG	Bryan Yong Wu Shen	PBM	Meor Shahimudin Hasim	IND		
P67	Kuala Kangsar	N34	Bukit Chandan	Maslin Sham Razman	BN (UMNO)	Azizul Rahim Abd Rahman	UMNO	Mohamad Hairul Amir Sabri	PKR	Hashim Bujang	BERSATU								
P67	Kuala Kangsar	N35	Manong	Mohamad Zuraimi Razali	BN (UMNO)	Mustafa Shah Abdul Hamid	UMNO	Mohd Jamsari Mahamood	AMANAH	Berhanudin Ahmad	PAS								
P68	Beruas	N36	Pengaklan Baharu	Abdul Manaf Hashim	BN (UMNO)	Azman Noh	UMNO	Abul Jais Ashfaq Ahmed	PKR	Ahmad Faisal Mansor	BERSATU	Abdul Halim Mat Isa	PEJUANG						
P68	Beruas	N37	Pantai Remis	Wong May Ing	PH (DAP)	Looi Tuan Gin	MCA	Wong May Ing	DAP	Eee Chin Oon	GERAKAN								
P68	Beruas	N38	Astaka	Teoh Yee Chern	PH (DAP)	Chieng Lee Chong	MCA	Jason Ng Thien Yeong	DAP	Yong Il Yan	GERAKAN								
P69	Parit	N39	Belanja	Khairudin Abu Hanipah	BN (UMNO)	Khairudin Abu Hanipah	UMNO	Mohd Ikhmal Mohd Iskandar	AMANAH	Wan Meor Safwat Naqiuddin Shamsudin	BERSATU	Shaharuzzaman Bistamam	PEJUANG						
P69	Parit	N40	Bota	Khairul Shahril Mohamed	BN (UMNO)	Khairul Shahril Mohamed	UMNO	Usaili Alias	PKR	Najihatussalehah Ahmad	PAS	Shahril Harahab	PEJUANG						
P70	Kampar	N41	Malim Nawar	Leong Cheok Keng	PBM	Chin Woon Kheong	MCA	Bavani Veraiah @ Shasha	DAP	Sharifah Aemeera Najwa Syed Mohamed	BERSATU			Leong Cheok Keng	WARISAN				
P70	Kampar	N42	Keranji	Chong Zhemin	PH (DAP)	Ng Wah Leng	MCA	Angeline Koo Hai Yen	DAP	Foong Kar Sing	GERAKAN			Puah Chee Haur	WARISAN				
P70	Kampar	N43	Tualang Sekah	Nolee Ashilin Mohamed Radzi	PN (BERSATU)	Abd Rahman Md Som	UMNO	Mohd Azlan Helmi	PKR	Pazli Abdullah Sani	BERSATU								
P71	Gopeng	N44	Sungai Rapat	Mohammad Nizar Jamaluddin	PH (AMANAH)	Hang Tuah Din @ Mohamed Din	UMNO	Mohammad Nizar Jamaluddin	AMANAH	Mohader Ahmad Mohammad Ayob	BERSATU			Roshanita Mohd Bashir	WARISAN				
P71	Gopeng	N45	Simpang Pulai	Tan Kar Hing	PH (PKR)	Lee Wai Yin	MCA	Wong Chai Yi	PKR	Selvam Kunjambu	BERSATU			Hooi Mi Suet	WARISAN				
P71	Gopeng	N46	Teja	Sandrea Ng Shy Ching	PH (PKR)	Liew Yee Lin	MCA	Sandrea Ng Shy Ching	PKR	Ahmad Ishak	BERSATU	Aswannudin Hariffudin	PEJUANG	Low Leong Sin	WARISAN				
P72	Tapah	N47	Chenderiang	Ahmad Faizal Azumu	PN (BERSATU)	Choong Shin Heng	MCA	Atyrah Hanim Razali	PKR	Mohd Yunus Mohd Yusop	BERSATU	Mohd Amin Man	PEJUANG	Ahmad Tarmizi Mohd Ghazali	WARISAN	Azrul Azmi Yaziz	IND	Teratai Bah Arom	IND
P72	Tapah	N48	Ayer Kuning	Samsudin Abu Hassan	BN (UMNO)	Ishsam Shahruddin	UMNO	Mohd Nazri Hashim	AMANAH	Muhammad Noor Farid Zainal	PAS	Maziah Salim	PEJUANG	Noor Hasnida Mohd Hashim	WARISAN	Bawani Kaniappan	PSM		
P73	Pasir Salak	N49	Sungai Manik	Zainol Fadzi Paharudin	PN (BERSATU)	Ibrahim Katop	UMNO	Mohamad Maharani Md Tasi	PKR	Zainol Fadzi Paharudin	BERSATU								
P73	Pasir Salak	N50	Kampong Gajah	Wan Norashikin Wan Noordin	BN (UMNO)	Wan Norashikin Wan Noordin	UMNO	Mohd Syamsul Alauddin	AMANAH	Zafarulazlan Zan	PAS	Mohd Safian Sauri Pandak Abd Samad	PUTRA						
P74	Lumut	N51	Pasir Panjang	Yahaya Mat Nor	PH (AMANAH)	Mohd Rafiq Mohd	UMNO	Yahaya Mat Nor	AMANAH	Rosli Abd Rahman	PAS	Mohd Norazlee Mohd	PEJUANG	Nur Inderasyawalis Ahmad Mukhtar	WARISAN				
P74	Lumut	N52	Pangkor	Zambry Abdul Kadir	BN (UMNO)	Norazman Man	UMNO	Abdul Razak Nazri	PKR	Norhaslinda Zakaria	BERSATU	Mohd Azlan Suhaimi	PEJUANG	Yahaya Ahmad	WARISAN				
P75	Bagan Datuk	N53	Rungkup	Shahrul Zaman Yahya	BN (UMNO)	Shahrul Zaman Yahya	UMNO	Ahmad Munzirie Ahmad Khabir	AMANAH	Mohd Mokheri Jalil	PAS								
P75	Bagan Datuk	N54	Hutan Melintang	Khairuddin Tarmizi	BN (UMNO)	Khairuddin Tarmizi	UMNO	Wasanthee Sinnasamy	PKR	Khairun Nizam Marsom	BERSATU								
P76	Teluk Intan	N55	Pasir Bedemar	Terence Naidu	PH (DAP)	Kong Sun Chin	MCA	Woo Kah Leong	DAP	Suriyananarayanan Sannasy Naidu	PAS								
P76	Teluk Intan	N56	Changkat Jong	Mohd Azhar Jamaluddin	BN (UMNO)	Mohd Azhar Jamaluddin	UMNO	Badrul Hisham Badarudin	DAP	Nadziruddin Mohamed Bandi	BERSATU	Muhammad Amirul Mahfuz	PEJUANG						
P77	Tanjong Malim	N57	Sungkai	Sivanesan Achalingam	PH (DAP)	Elango Vadiveloo	MIC	Sivanesan Achalingam	DAP	Thilak Raj Gunasekaran	PAS			Mahhadee Ramli	IND				
P77	Tanjong Malim	N58	Slim	Mohd Zaidi Aziz	BN (UMNO)	Mohd Zaidi Aziz	UMNO	Mohd Syahid Mohd Zaini	PKR	Muhammad Zulfadli Zainal	PAS	Meor Muhammad Azim Meor Aznam	PEJUANG						
P77	Tanjong Malim	N59	Behrang	Aminuddin Zulkipli	PH (AMANAH)	Salina Samsudin	UMNO	Khairol Najib Hashim	AMANAH	Amran Ibrahim	BERSATU	Hazvee Hafis	PUTRA						

== Results ==
Party or alliance		Votes	%	Seats	+/–
Perikatan Nasional	Malaysian Islamic Party	221,784	14.96	16	+13
Perikatan Nasional	Malaysian United Indigenous Party	207,347	13.98	10	+9
Perikatan Nasional	Parti Gerakan Rakyat Malaysia	26,603	1.79	0	0
Perikatan Nasional	Total	455,734	30.73	26	+22
Pakatan Harapan	Democratic Action Party	341,337	23.02	18	0
Pakatan Harapan	People's Justice Party	162,988	10.99	5	+1
Pakatan Harapan	National Trust Party	128,560	8.67	1	–5
Pakatan Harapan	Total	632,885	42.68	24	–4
Barisan Nasional	United Malays National Organisation	300,539	20.27	8	–19
Barisan Nasional	Malaysian Chinese Association	68,510	4.62	1	+1
Barisan Nasional	Malaysian Indian Congress	10,324	0.70	0	0
Barisan Nasional	Malaysia Makkal Sakti Party	1,443	0.10	0	New
Barisan Nasional	Total	380,816	25.68	9	–18
Gerakan Tanah Air	Homeland Fighter's Party	3,960	0.27	0	New
Gerakan Tanah Air	Parti Bumiputera Perkasa Malaysia	317	0.02	0	New
Gerakan Tanah Air	Total	4,277	0.29	0	0
Heritage Party		1,971	0.13	0	New
Parti Bangsa Malaysia		710	0.05	0	New
Socialist Party of Malaysia		586	0.04	0	0
Independents		5,978	0.40	0	0
Total		1,482,957	100.00	59	0
Valid votes		1,482,957	98.71		
Invalid/blank votes		19,445	1.29		
Total votes		1,502,402	100.00		
Registered voters/turnout		2,036,872	73.76		
Source: SPR, SPR

=== By parliamentary constituency ===
Combination of Pakatan Harapan (won 10 of 24) and Barisan Nasional (won 3 of 24); results both coalitions to won 13 of 24 parliamentary constituency.

No.	Constituency	Barisan Nasional	Pakatan Harapan	Perikatan Nasional	Member of Parliament
P054	Gerik	41.23%	16.74%	42.03%	Vacant (14th Parliament)
P054	Gerik	41.23%	16.74%	42.03%	Fathul Huzir Ayob (15th Parliament)
P055	Lenggong	44.74%	12.23%	43.03%	Shamsul Anuar Nasarah
P056	Larut	31.13%	11.96%	56.02%	Hamzah Zainudin
P057	Parit Buntar	22.28%	32.60%	45.12%	Mujahid Yusof Rawa (14th Parliament)
P057	Parit Buntar	22.28%	32.60%	45.12%	Mohd Misbahul Munir Masduki (15th Parliament)
P058	Bagan Serai	27.78%	20.85%	51.37%	Noor Azmi Ghazali (14th Parliament)
P058	Bagan Serai	27.78%	20.85%	51.37%	Idris Ahmad (15th Parliament)
P059	Bukit Gantang	31.28%	26.04%	41.99%	Syed Abu Hussin Hafiz Syed Abdul Fasal
P060	Taiping	15.37%	55.16%	27.06%	Teh Kok Lim (14th Parliament)
P060	Taiping	15.37%	55.16%	27.06%	Wong Kah Woh (15th Parliament)
P061	Padang Rengas	33.54%	22.34%	43.67%	Mohamed Nazri Abdul Aziz (14th Parliament)
P061	Padang Rengas	33.54%	22.34%	43.67%	Azahari Hasan (15th Parliament)
P062	Sungai Siput	37.17%	42.47%	18.81%	Kesavan Subramaniam
P063	Tambun	24.82%	36.37%	38.46%	Ahmad Faizal Azumu (14th Parliament)
P063	Tambun	24.82%	36.37%	38.46%	Anwar Ibrahim (15th Parliament)
P064	Ipoh Timor	11.30%	72.01%	16.45%	Wong Kah Woh (14th Parliament)
P064	Ipoh Timor	11.30%	72.01%	16.45%	Howard Lee Chuan How (15th Parliament)
P065	Ipoh Barat	9.91%	80.33%	9.28%	Kulasegaran Murugeson
P066	Batu Gajah	8.64%	80.10%	9.32%	Sivakumar Varatharaju Naidu (14th Parliament)
P067	Kuala Kangsar	29.95%	28.69%	41.36%	Mastura Mohd Yazid (14th Parliament)
P067	Kuala Kangsar	29.95%	28.69%	41.36%	Iskandar Dzulkarnain Abdul Khalid (15th Parliament)
P068	Beruas	19.87%	63.64%	16.32%	Ngeh Koo Ham
P069	Parit	41.83%	13.39%	43.81%	Mohd Nizar Zakaria (14th Parliament)
P069	Parit	41.83%	13.39%	43.81%	Muhammad Ismi Mat Taib (15th Parliament)
P070	Kampar	24.57%	52.32%	21.78%	Su Keong Siong (14th Parliament)
P070	Kampar	24.57%	52.32%	21.78%	Chong Zhemin (15th Parliament)
P071	Gopeng	20.64%	54.62%	23.92%	Lee Boon Chye (14th Parliament)
P071	Gopeng	20.64%	54.62%	23.92%	Tan Kar Hing (15th Parliament)
P072	Tapah	39.26%	29.25%	26.20%	Saravanan Murugan
P073	Pasir Salak	33.35%	18.37%	47.75%	Tajuddin Abdul Rahman (14th Parliament)
P073	Pasir Salak	33.35%	18.37%	47.75%	Jamaluddin Yahya (15th Parliament)
P074	Lumut	29.22%	29.11%	40.31%	Mohd Hatta Ramli (14th Parliament)
P074	Lumut	29.22%	29.11%	40.31%	Nordin Ahmad Ismail (15th Parliament)
P075	Bagan Datuk	42.56%	37.11%	20.33%	Ahmad Zahid Hamidi
P076	Teluk Intan	22.83%	51.71%	24.97%	Nga Kor Ming
P077	Tanjong Malim	33.52%	36.03%	28.86%	Chang Lih Kang

=== Seats that changed allegiance ===
No.	Seat	Previous Party (2018)	Current Party (2022)
N01	Pengkalan Hulu	Barisan Nasional (UMNO)	Perikatan Nasional (PAS)
N03	Kenering	Barisan Nasional (UMNO)	Perikatan Nasional (PAS)
N07	Batu Kurau	Barisan Nasional (UMNO)	Perikatan Nasional (BERSATU)
N08	Titi Serong	Pakatan Harapan (AMANAH)	Perikatan Nasional (PAS)
N09	Kuala Kurau	Pakatan Harapan (PKR)	Perikatan Nasional (BERSATU)
N10	Alor Pongsu	Barisan Nasional (UMNO)	Perikatan Nasional (BERSATU)
N12	Selinsing	Barisan Nasional (UMNO)	Perikatan Nasional (PAS)
N13	Kuala Sepetang	Barisan Nasional (UMNO)	Perikatan Nasional (PAS)
N14	Changkat Jering	Barisan Nasional (UMNO)	Perikatan Nasional (BERSATU)
N15	Trong	Barisan Nasional (UMNO)	Perikatan Nasional (PAS)
N16	Kamunting	Pakatan Harapan (AMANAH)	Perikatan Nasional (PAS)
N19	Chenderoh	Barisan Nasional (UMNO)	Perikatan Nasional (BERSATU)
N20	Lubok Merbau	Barisan Nasional (UMNO)	Perikatan Nasional (PAS)
N23	Manjoi	Pakatan Harapan (AMANAH)	Perikatan Nasional (PAS)
N34	Bukit Chandan	Barisan Nasional (UMNO)	Perikatan Nasional (PAS)
N35	Manong	Barisan Nasional (UMNO)	Perikatan Nasional (BERSATU)
N40	Bota	Barisan Nasional (UMNO)	Perikatan Nasional (PAS)
N43	Tualang Sekah	Barisan Nasional (UMNO)	Pakatan Harapan (PKR)
N47	Chenderiang	Pakatan Harapan (BERSATU)	Barisan Nasional (MCA)
N49	Sungai Manik	Barisan Nasional (UMNO)	Perikatan Nasional (BERSATU)
N50	Kampong Gajah	Barisan Nasional (UMNO)	Perikatan Nasional (PAS)
N51	Pasir Panjang	Pakatan Harapan (AMANAH)	Perikatan Nasional (PAS)
N52	Pangkor	Barisan Nasional (UMNO)	Perikatan Nasional (BERSATU)
N54	Hutan Melintang	Barisan Nasional (UMNO)	Pakatan Harapan (PKR)
N56	Changkat Jong	Barisan Nasional (UMNO)	Perikatan Nasional (BERSATU)
N58	Slim	Barisan Nasional (UMNO)	Perikatan Nasional (PAS)
N59	Behrang	Pakatan Harapan (AMANAH)	Barisan Nasional (UMNO)

== See also ==
- 2022 Malaysian general election
- Politics of Malaysia
- List of political parties in Malaysia
