= Ong Seng Guan =

Malaysian politician

Yang Berhormat Tuan Ong Seng Guan MLA
- 王星元

Member of the Perak State Legislative Assembly for Pokok Assam
- Incumbent
- Assumed office 19 November 2022
- Preceded by: Leow Thye Yih (PH–DAP)
- Majority: 12,180 (2022)

Personal details
- Born: Ong Seng Guan; 12 February 1976 (age 50) Malaysia
- Party: Democratic Action Party (DAP)
- Other political affiliations: Pakatan Harapan (PH)
- Occupation: Politician

Ong Seng Guan

Chinese name
- Traditional Chinese: 王星元
- Simplified Chinese: 王星元
Transcriptions
Standard Mandarin
- Hanyu Pinyin: Wáng Xīngyuán

Ong Seng Guan (Chinese: 王星元; pinyin: Wáng Xīngyuán; born 12 February 1976) is a Malaysian politician who has served as member of the Perak State Legislative Assembly (MLA) for Pokok Assam since November 2022. He is a member of the Democratic Action Party (DAP), a component party of the Pakatan Harapan (PH) coalition. He was political secretary to the member of parliament (MP) for Taiping Teh Kok Lim, member of the Taiping Municipal Council (MPT) and head of the Community Service Centre of DAP of Pokok Assam.

== Member of the Perak State Legislative Assembly (since 2022) ==
In the 2022 Perak state election, Ong made his electoral debut after being nominated by PH to contest the Pokok Assam state seat. Ong won the seat and was elected to the Perak State Legislative Assembly as the Pokok Assam MLA after defeating Shariful Juhari Abu Kassim of Perikatan Nasional (PN), Ang Sui Eng of Barisan Nasional (BN), incumbent Pokok Assam MLA and independent candidate Leow Thye Yih and another independent candidate Mohd Yusoff Abdul Hamid by a majority of 12,180 votes.

== Election results ==
Perak State Legislative Assembly
| Year | Constituency | Candidate | Votes | Pct | Opponent(s) | Votes | Pct | Ballots cast | Majority | Turnout |
|---|---|---|---|---|---|---|---|---|---|---|
| 2022 | N17 Pokok Assam | Ong Seng Guan (DAP) | 16,726 | 67.36% | Shariful Juhari Abu Kassim (BERSATU) | 4,546 | 18.31% | 24,829 | 12,180 | 68.00% |
| 2022 | N17 Pokok Assam | Ong Seng Guan (DAP) | 16,726 | 67.36% | Ang Sui Eng (MCA) | 2,660 | 10.71% | 24,829 | 12,180 | 68.00% |
| 2022 | N17 Pokok Assam | Ong Seng Guan (DAP) | 16,726 | 67.36% | Leow Thye Yih (IND) | 786 | 3.17% | 24,829 | 12,180 | 68.00% |
| 2022 | N17 Pokok Assam | Ong Seng Guan (DAP) | 16,726 | 67.36% | Mohd Yusoff Abdul Hamid (IND) | 111 | 0.45% | 24,829 | 12,180 | 68.00% |
