= Yee Seu Kai =

Malaysian politician

- 余兆佳

Member of the Perak State Legislative Assembly for Pokok Assam
- In office 2008–2013
- Preceded by: Ho Cheng Wang
- Succeeded by: Teh Kok Lim

Personal details
- Born: Yee Seu Kai
- Citizenship: Malaysian
- Party: DAP
- Other political affiliations: Pakatan Rakyat
- Occupation: Politician

Yee Seu Kai

Chinese name
- Traditional Chinese: 余兆佳
- Hanyu Pinyin: Yú Zhào Jiā
- Jyutping: Jyu4 Siu6 Gaai1
- Hokkien POJ: Û Tiāu-ka / Î Tiāu-ka
- Tâi-lô: Û Tiāu-ka / Î Tiāu-ka

Yee Seu Kai is a Malaysian politician from DAP. He was the Member of Perak State Legislative Assembly for Pokok Assam from 2008 to 2013.

== Politics ==
He wanted to quit politics before the 2013 Malaysian general election, thus the DAP Perak state chairman, Nga Kor Ming had arranged his special assistant, Teh Kok Lim to replace him to defend the seat.

== Election result ==
Perak State Legislative Assembly
Year	Constituency	Candidate	Votes	Pct.	Opponent(s)	Votes	Pct.	Ballots cast	Majority	Turnout
2008	N17 Pokok Assam	Yee Seu Kai (DAP)	7,574	52.01%	Ho Cheng Wang (MCA)	6,709	46.15%	14,538	865	70.19%
