= Noor Azman Ghazali =

Malaysian politician

Yang Berhormat Tuan Noor Azman Ghazali MLA

Member of the Perak State Legislative Assembly for Alor Pongsu
- Incumbent
- Assumed office 19 December 2022
- Preceded by: Sham Mat Sahat (BN–UMNO)
- Majority: 4,015 (2022)

Personal details
- Born: Noor Azman bin Ghazali Bagan Serai, Perak, Malaysia
- Party: Malaysian United Indigenous Party (BERSATU)
- Other political affiliations: Perikatan Nasional (PN)
- Relatives: Noor Azmi Ghazali (brother); Noor Azlan Ghazali (younger brother)
- Occupation: Politician

Noor Azman bin Ghazali is a Malaysian politician who served as Member of the Perak State Legislative Assembly (MLA) for Alor Pongsu since November 2022. He is a member of Malaysian United Indigenous Party (BERSATU), a component party of Perikatan Nasional (PN) coalitions. He was the younger brother of Noor Azmi Ghazali, the former MP for Bagan Serai.

== Election results ==
Perak State Legislative Assembly
| Year | Constituency | Candidate | Votes | Pct | Opponent(s) | Votes | Pct | Ballots cast | Majority | Turnout |
|---|---|---|---|---|---|---|---|---|---|---|
| 2022 | N10 Alor Pongsu | Noor Azman Ghazali (BERSATU) | 10,622 | 47.78% | Sham Mat Sahat (UMNO) | 6,607 | 29.72% | 22,582 | 4,015 | 78.80% |
| 2022 | N10 Alor Pongsu | Noor Azman Ghazali (BERSATU) | 10,622 | 47.78% | Khairul Azman Ahmad (PKR) | 5,004 | 22.51% | 22,582 | 4,015 | 78.80% |
