= Mohamad Kamil Shafie =

Malaysian politician

Yang Berbahagia Dato' Mohamad Kamil Shafie DPMP KMN PPT

Member of the Perak State Legislative Assembly for Manong
- In office 5 May 2013 – 9 May 2018
- Preceded by: Ramly Zahari (BN–UMNO)
- Succeeded by: Mohamad Zuraimi Razali (BN–UMNO)
- Majority: 231 (2013)

Personal details
- Party: United Malays National Organisation (UMNO)
- Other political affiliations: Barisan Nasional (BN)

Mohamad Kamil bin Shafie is a Malaysian politician who served as Member of the Perak State Legislative Assembly (MLA) for Manong from May 2013 to May 2018. He is a member of United Malays National Organisation (UMNO), a component party of Barisan Nasional (BN) coalitions.

== Election results ==
Perak State Legislative Assembly
Year	Constituency	Candidate	Votes	Pct	Opponent(s)	Votes	Pct	Ballots cast	Majority	Turnout
2013	N35 Manong	Mohamad Kamil Shafie (UMNO)	7,405	50.79%	Jamil Dzulkarnain (PAS)	7,174	49.21%	14,812	231	84.35%

== Honours ==
- Malaysia
  - Officer of the Order of the Defender of the Realm (KMN) (2014)
- Perak
  - Knight Commander of the Order of the Perak State Crown (DPMP) – Dato' (2016)
  - Recipient of the Distinguished Conduct Medal (PPT) (2003)
