= Porky Wing =

Porky Wing or Chu Bak Yeong (猪肉荣) may refer to:

- Lam Sai-wing (林世荣): Chinese martial artist, acupuncturist
- Jason Ng Thien Yeong (黄天荣): Malaysian politician and lawyer, pork seller at Sitiawan
