= Wong May Ing =

Malaysian politician

Yang Berhormat Puan Wong May Ing MLA
- 黄渼沄

Member of the Perak State Executive Council (Attitude Development, Woman, Family and Community Welfare)
- In office 19 May 2018 – 10 March 2020
- Monarch: Nazrin Shah
- Menteri Besar: Ahmad Faizal Azumu
- Preceded by: Mohd Nizar Zakaria (Attitude Development); Rusnah Kassim (Woman, Family and Community Welfare)
- Succeeded by: Wan Norashikin Wan Noordin
- Constituency: Pantai Remis

Member of the Perak State Legislative Assembly for Pantai Remis
- Incumbent
- Assumed office 5 May 2013
- Preceded by: Nga Kor Ming (PR–DAP)
- Majority: 9,471 (2013); 13,316 (2018); 16,432 (2022)

Personal details
- Born: Wong May Ing; 9 February 1979 (age 47) Perak, Malaysia
- Citizenship: Malaysian
- Party: Democratic Action Party (DAP)
- Other political affiliations: Pakatan Rakyat (PR) (2008–2015); Pakatan Harapan (PH) (since 2015)
- Occupation: Politician

Wong May Ing (Chinese: 黃渼澐; pinyin: Huáng Měiyún; Jyutping: Wong4 Mei5 Wan4; Pe̍h-ōe-jī: N̂g Bí-hûn; born 9 February 1979) is a Malaysian politician who has served as Member of the Perak State Legislative Assembly (MLA) for Pantai Remis since May 2013. She served as Member of the Perak State Executive Council (EXCO) in the Pakatan Harapan (PH) state administration under former Menteri Besar Ahmad Faizal Azumu from May 2018 to the collapse of the PH state administration in March 2020. She is a member of the Democratic Action Party (DAP), a component party of the PH and formerly Pakatan Rakyat (PR) coalitions.

== Election results ==
Perak State Legislative Assembly
Year	Constituency	Candidate	Votes	Pct	Opponent(s)	Votes	Pct	Ballots cast	Majority	Turnout%
2013	N37 Pantai Remis	Wong May Ing (DAP)	17,092	69.16%	Koh Ser Yun (MCA)	7,621	30.84%	25,132	9,471	79.30%
2018	N37 Pantai Remis	Wong May Ing (DAP)	18,608	77.86%	Ho Kean Wei (MCA)	5,292	22.14%	22,477	13,316	75.70%
2022	N37 Pantai Remis	Wong May Ing (DAP)	20,840	72.24%	Albert Looi Tuan Gin (MCA)	4,408	15.28%	28,848	16,432	64.93%
2022	N37 Pantai Remis	Wong May Ing (DAP)	20,840	72.24%	Eee Chin Oon (Gerakan)	3,600	12.48%	28,848	16,432	64.93%
