= Leow Thye Yih =

Malaysian politician

- 廖泰義

Member of the Perak State Legislative Assembly for Pokok Assam
- In office 9 May 2018 – 19 November 2022
- Preceded by: Teh Kok Lim (PH–DAP)
- Succeeded by: Ong Seng Guan (PH–DAP)
- Majority: 12,032 (2018)

Member of the Perak State Legislative Assembly for Aulong
- In office 5 May 2013 – 9 May 2018
- Preceded by: Yew Tian Hoe (PR–DAP)
- Succeeded by: Nga Kor Ming (PH–DAP)
- Majority: 7,330 (2013)

Personal details
- Born: Leow Thye Yih
- Citizenship: Malaysian
- Party: Democratic Action Party (DAP) (–2022); Independent (since 2022)
- Other political affiliations: Pakatan Rakyat (PR) (2008–2015); Pakatan Harapan (PH) (2015–2022)
- Occupation: Politician

Leow Thye Yih (Pe̍h-ōe-jī: Liāu Thài-gī) is a Malaysian politician who served as Member of the Perak State Legislative Assembly (MLA) for Pokok Assam from May 2018 to November 2022 and for Aulong from May 2013 to May 2018. He is an independent and was a member of the Democratic Action Party (DAP), a component party of the Pakatan Harapan (PH) and formerly Pakatan Rakyat (PR) opposition coalitions. He also served as the State Assistant Organising Secretary of DAP of Perak.

== Education ==
He is a Bachelor of Optometry.

== Political career ==
=== Resignation from DAP party positions to support Paul Yong ===
On 11 September 2019, he resigned as State Assistant Organising Secretary of DAP of Perak along with Malim Nawar MLA Leong Cheok Keng who resigned as Treasurer of DAP of Perak as a sign of support for Member of the Perak State Executive Council (EXCO) and Tronoh MLA Paul Yong Choo Kiong as State Chairman of DAP of Perak Nga Kor Ming wanted to remove Yong as an EXCO member after involving in a rapping case.

=== Rumours of leaving DAP for MCA ===
In early January 2021, there were rumours that he and Leong were leaving DAP to join the opposing Malaysian Chinese Association (MCA), a component party of the ruling Barisan Nasional (BN) coalition but they both denied. To reaffirm his denial, he signed a statutory declaration (SD) to serve as a DAP MLA for full term.

=== Leaving DAP to contest in the 2022 general election as an independent candidate ===
Two days before the Nomination Day of the 2022 general election and 2022 Perak state election on 3 November 2022, he left DAP after the party decided not to nominate him as a candidate in both the general election and the state election. He also announced his candidacy to contest for the Taiping federal seat as an independent candidate and called on Taiping voters to give him a chance to do more for Taiping. He explained that he left the party out of "desperation" to bring greater development to the area and to raise the standard of living of the Taiping people. He also hoped that voters would consider voting based on the performance of candidates instead of voting based on party lines. He faced his former party comrade and caretaker Member of Parliament (MP) for Ipoh Timor Wong Kah Woh who was nominated by DAP and PH to contest for the Taiping seat in the election. He also thanked DAP for nominating him to contest for the Aulong and Pokok Assam state seats in the 2013 and 2018 Perak state elections. He lost the election to Wong by a majority of 45,944 votes, garnering only 1,154 votes, which is 1.36% of the total votes and losing the deposit of RM 10,000. For the deposit to be refunded, he has to garner at least 10,597 votes, which is 12.5% of the total votes.

== Election results ==
Perak State Legislative Assembly
Year	Constituency	Candidate	Votes	Pct	Opponent(s)	Votes	Pct	Ballots cast	Majority	Turnout
2013	N18 Aulong	Leow Thye Yih (DAP)	14,843	65.73%	Soo Kay Ping (Gerakan)	7,513	33.35%	22,896	7,330	80.50%
2013	N18 Aulong	Leow Thye Yih (DAP)	14,843	65.73%	Yew Tian Hoe (IND)	225	0.98%	22,896	7,330	80.50%
2018	N17 Pokok Assam	Leow Thye Yih (DAP)	16,954	75.66%	Lee Li Kuan (MCA)	4,922	21.96%	22,409	12,032	78.38%
2022	N17 Pokok Assam	Leow Thye Yih (IND)	786	3.17%	Ong Seng Guan (DAP)	16,726	67.36%	24,829	12,180	68.00%
2022	N17 Pokok Assam	Leow Thye Yih (IND)	786	3.17%	Shariful Juhari Abu Kassim (BERSATU)	4,546	18.31%	24,829	12,180	68.00%
2022	N17 Pokok Assam	Leow Thye Yih (IND)	786	3.17%	Ang Sui Eng (MCA)	2,660	10.71%	24,829	12,180	68.00%
2022	N17 Pokok Assam	Leow Thye Yih (IND)	786	3.17%	Mohd Yusoff Abdul Hamid (IND)	111	0.45%	24,829	12,180	68.00%

Parliament of Malaysia
Year	Constituency	Candidate	Votes	Pct	Opponent(s)	Votes	Pct	Ballots cast	Majority	Turnout
2022	P060 Taiping	Leow Thye Yih (IND)	1,154	1.36%	Wong Kah Woh (DAP)	47,098	55.56%	84,769	25,529	69.73%
2022	P060 Taiping	Leow Thye Yih (IND)	1,154	1.36%	See Tean Seng (Gerakan)	21,569	25.44%	84,769	25,529	69.73%
2022	P060 Taiping	Leow Thye Yih (IND)	1,154	1.36%	Neow Choo Seong (MCA)	14,599	17.22%	84,769	25,529	69.73%
2022	P060 Taiping	Leow Thye Yih (IND)	1,154	1.36%	Mohganan P Manikam (IND)	236	0.28%	84,769	25,529	69.73%
2022	P060 Taiping	Leow Thye Yih (IND)	1,154	1.36%	A. Rama Moorthy @ Steven Ram (IND)	113	0.13%	84,769	25,529	69.73%
