= Taiping (federal constituency) =

Federal constituency in Perak, Malaysia

Taiping (P060)
Perak constituency

Federal constituency
- Legislature: Dewan Rakyat
- MP: Wong Kah Woh; PH
- Constituency created: 1974
- First contested: 1974
- Last contested: 2022

Demographics
- Population (2020): 130,712
- Electors (2022): 121,566
- Area (km²): 118
- Pop. density (per km²): 1,107.7

Taiping is a federal constituency in Larut, Matang and Selama District, Perak, Malaysia, that has been represented in the Dewan Rakyat since 1974.

The federal constituency was created in the 1974 redistribution and is mandated to return a single member to the Dewan Rakyat under the first past the post voting system.

== Demographics ==
Ethnic breakdown of Taiping's electorate as of 2022
1. Chinese (44.3%)
2. Malay (39.8%)
3. Indian (14.4%)
4. Other ethnicities (1.50%)

As of 2020, Taiping has a population of 130,712 people.

Age breakdown of Taiping's electorate as of 2022
1. 18–20 (4.72%)
2. 21–29 (18.9%)
3. 30–39 (22.3%)
4. 40–49 (16.1%)
5. 50–59 (13.7%)
6. 60–69 (13.3%)
7. 70–79 (7.59%)
8. 80–89 (2.73%)
9. above 90 (0.59%)
Gender breakdown of Taiping's electorate as of 2022
1. Male (49.1%)
2. Female (50.9%)

== History ==
=== Polling districts ===
According to the federal gazette issued on 31 October 2022, the Taiping constituency is divided into 42 polling districts.

State constituency	Polling Districts	Code	Location
Kamunting (N16)	Sungai Relong	060/16/01	SMK Bukit Jana
Kamunting (N16)	Expo	060/16/02	SMK Kamunitng
Kamunting (N16)	Kamunting Baru	060/16/03	SK Kamunting
Kamunting (N16)	Kamunting	060/16/04	SJK (C) Phui Choi
Kamunting (N16)	Kampong Pinang Utara	060/16/05	SA Bantuan Kerajaan Maahad Al-Khair Lil Banat
Kamunting (N16)	Kampong Pinang Timor	060/16/06	SK Long Jaafar
Kamunting (N16)	Kampong Pinang Selatan	060/16/07	SK Long Jaafar
Kamunting (N16)	Kamunting Road	060/16/08	SK All Saints
Kamunting (N16)	Bukit Jana	060/16/09	SK Taman Jana; SRA Rakyat Nurul Nizomiyyah
Kamunting (N16)	Waterfall Road	060/16/10	SK King Edward VII (2)
Pokok Assam (N17)	Pokok Assam	060/17/01	SK Methodist; SRA Rakyat Al-Ihsaniah
Pokok Assam (N17)	Kampong Aman	060/17/02	SK Seri Aman
Pokok Assam (N17)	Sekolah	060/17/03	Dewan Pokok Assam Tambahan
Pokok Assam (N17)	Jalan Raja Muda	060/17/04	SJK (C) Pokok Assam
Pokok Assam (N17)	Pasar	060/17/05	SJK (C) Pokok Asaam
Pokok Assam (N17)	Sungai Tupai	060/17/06	SJK (C) Pokok Asaam
Pokok Assam (N17)	Simpang Road	060/17/07	Dewan Sri Kota
Pokok Assam (N17)	Kota Road	060/17/08	SJK (T) YMHA
Pokok Assam (N17)	Market Street	060/17/09	SK St George 1
Pokok Assam (N17)	Theatre Road	060/17/10	SMK Convent
Pokok Assam (N17)	Tupai Lane	060/17/11	SJK (C) Hua Lian (3)
Pokok Assam (N17)	Tupai	060/17/12	SMK Kampung Jambu
Pokok Assam (N17)	Coronation Road	060/17/13	SMK Taman Tasik
Pokok Assam (N17)	Birch Village	060/17/14	Sekolah Tinggi Hua Lian
Pokok Assam (N17)	Eastern Road	060/17/15	Sekolah Tinggi Hua Lian
Pokok Assam (N17)	Museum	060/17/16	SMK (P) Treacher Methodist
Aulong (N18)	Batu Dua	060/18/01	SK Asam Kumbang
Aulong (N18)	Assam Kumbang	060/18/02	SRA Rakyat Madrasah Al-Tarbiah Al-Islamiah
Aulong (N18)	Barrack Road	060/18/03	SK King Edward VII (1)
Aulong (N18)	Station	060/18/04	SJK (C) Hua Lian (1)
Aulong (N18)	Aulong	060/18/05	SK Taman Panglima
Aulong (N18)	Aulong Timor	060/18/06	SJK (C) Aulong
Aulong (N18)	Aulong Tengah	060/18/07	Arena Sukan Kampung Baru Aulong
Aulong (N18)	Aulong Barat	060/18/08	SJK (C) Aulong
Aulong (N18)	Aulong Selatan	060/18/09	SRA Rakyat Nurul Islam; SK Convent Aulong
Aulong (N18)	Aulong Lama	060/18/10	SK Kampung Boyan
Aulong (N18)	Kampong Boyan	060/18/11	SRA Rakyat Al-Khairiah Al-Taufiqiah; Dewan Serbaguna Kampong Boyan
Aulong (N18)	Taman Sening	060/18/12	SMK Doktor Burhanhddin
Aulong (N18)	Taman Marisa	060/18/13	SMK Sri Kota
Aulong (N18)	Kota Lama	060/18/14	SMK Sri Kota
Aulong (N18)	Pengkalan Aor	060/18/15	SK Simpang; SRA Rakyat Al-Hidayah
Aulong (N18)	Simpang Baru	060/18/16	SJK (C) Sin Min

=== Representation history ===
Members of Parliament for Taiping
Parliament	No	Years	Member	Party	Vote Share
Constituency created from Larut Selatan and Larut Utara
4th	P049	1974–1978	Paul Leong Khee Seong (梁棋祥)	BN (GERAKAN)	14,253; 53.19%
5th	P049	1978–1982	Paul Leong Khee Seong (梁棋祥)	BN (GERAKAN)	20,915; 57.21%
6th	P049	1982–1986	Paul Leong Khee Seong (梁棋祥)	BN (GERAKAN)	25,841; 66.04%
7th	P054	1986–1990	Paul Leong Khee Seong (梁棋祥)	BN (GERAKAN)	20,969; 57.78%
8th	P054	1990–1995	Kerk Choo Ting (郭洙镇)	BN (GERAKAN)	22,162; 50.87%
9th	P057	1995–1999	Kerk Choo Ting (郭洙镇)	BN (GERAKAN)	30,459; 68.99%
10th	P057	1999–2004	Kerk Choo Ting (郭洙镇)	BN (GERAKAN)	24,531; 53.65%
11th	P060	2004–2008	M. Kayveas (எம் கேவியஸ்)	BN (myPPP)	20,129; 47.41%
12th	P060	2008–2013	Nga Kor Ming (倪可敏)	PR (DAP)	28,098; 62.58%
13th	P060	2013–2015	Nga Kor Ming (倪可敏)	PR (DAP)	37,275; 59.35%
13th	P060	2015–2018	Nga Kor Ming (倪可敏)	PH (DAP)	37,275; 59.35%
14th	P060	2018–2022	Teh Kok Lim (郑国霖)	PH (DAP)	42,997; 61.65%
15th	P060	2022–present	Wong Kah Woh (黄家和)	PH (DAP)	47,098; 55.56%

=== State constituency ===
Parliamentary constituency	State constituency						
Parliamentary constituency	1955–1959*	1959–1974	1974–1986	1986–1995	1995–2004	2004–2018	2018–present
Taiping				Asam Kumbang			
Taiping					Aulong		
Taiping			Kamunting				
Taiping			Kelian Pauh				
Taiping					Pokok Assam		

=== Historical boundaries ===
State Constituency	Area				
State Constituency	1974	1984	1994	2003	2018
Asam Kumbang		Assam Kumbang; Aulong; Kampung Birch; Sungai Lidin; Taiping			
Aulong			Assam Kumbang; Aulong; Klian Pauh; Taiping; Taman Dato Sri Razak	Assam Kumbang; Aulong; Kampung Murni; Klian Pauh; Taiping	Assam Kumbang; Aulong; Kampung Murni; Simpang; Taman Ehsan
Kamunting	Aulong; Bukit Larut; Changkat Larah; Kampung Exco Tambahan; Kamunting	Bukit Jana; Bukit Larut; Kampung Klian Pauh; Kamunting; Taman Dato Sri Razak	Bukit Jana; Bukit Larut; Kampung Exco Tambahan; Kamunting; Taman Saujana	Bukit Jana; Bukit Larut; Kampung Exco Tambahan; Kampung Klian Pauh Baru; Kamunting	
Kelian Pauh	Bukit Larut; Kampung Aman; Kampung Birch; Kelian Pauh; Taman Saujana				
Pokok Assam			Kampung Aman; Kampung Birch; Pokok Assam; Taiping; Ulu Tapai		Kampung Aman; Kampung Birch; Pokok Assam; Taman Sri Hijau; Taiping

=== Current state assembly members ===
No.	State Constituency	Member	Coalition (Party)
N16	Kamunting	Mohd Fakhrudin Abdul Aziz	PN (PAS)
N17	Pokok Assam	Ong Seng Guan	PH (DAP)
N18	Aulong	Teh Kok Lim	PH (DAP)

=== Local governments & postcodes ===
No.	State Constituency	Local Government	Postcode
N16	Kamunting	Taiping Municipal Council	34000 Taiping; 34400 Simpang Ampat Semanggol; 34600 Kamunting; 34700 Simpang
N17	Pokok Assam	Taiping Municipal Council	34000 Taiping; 34400 Simpang Ampat Semanggol; 34600 Kamunting; 34700 Simpang
N18	Aulong	Taiping Municipal Council	34000 Taiping; 34400 Simpang Ampat Semanggol; 34600 Kamunting; 34700 Simpang

== Election results ==
Malaysian general election, 2022
Party	Candidate	Votes	%	∆%
PH	Wong Kah Woh	47,098	55.56	▲55.56
PN	See Tean Seng	21,569	25.44	▲25.44
BN	Neow Choo Seong	14,599	17.22	▼5.17
Independent	Leow Thye Yih	1,154	1.36	▲1.36
Independent	Mohganan Manikam	236	0.28	▲0.28
Independent	A. Rama Moorthy @ Steven Ram	113	0.13	▲0.13
Total valid votes		84,769	100.00	
Total rejected ballots		1,121		
Unreturned ballots		146		
Turnout		86,136	69.73	▼8.85
Registered electors		121,566		
Majority		25,529	30.12	▼9.14
PH hold		Swing		
Source(s) https://lom.agc.gov.my/ilims/upload/portal/akta/outputp/1753277/PUB610%20PARLIMEN%20PERAK.pdf

Malaysian general election, 2018
Party	Candidate	Votes	%	∆%
PKR	Teh Kok Lim	42,997	61.65	▲61.65
BN	Tan Keng Liang	15,613	22.39	▼18.26
PAS	Ibrahim Ismail	11,133	15.96	▲15.96
Total valid votes		69,743	100.00	
Total rejected ballots		1,092		
Unreturned ballots		462		
Turnout		71,297	78.58	▼3.20
Registered electors		90,729		
Majority		27,384	39.26	▲20.56
PKR hold		Swing		
Source(s) "His Majesty's Government Gazette - Notice of Contested Election, Parliament for the State of Perak [P.U. (B) 237/2018]" (PDF). Attorney General's Chambers of Malaysia. 3 May 2018. "Federal Government Gazette - Results of Contested Election and Statements of the Poll after the Official Addition of Votes, Parliamentary Constituencies for the State of Perak [P.U. (B) 311/2018]" (PDF). Attorney General's Chambers of Malaysia. 28 May 2018.

Malaysian general election, 2013
Party	Candidate	Votes	%	∆%
DAP	Nga Kor Ming	37,275	59.35	▼3.23
BN	Tan Lian Hoe	25,530	40.65	▲3.23
Total valid votes		62,805	100.00	
Total rejected ballots		944		
Unreturned ballots		164		
Turnout		63,913	81.78	▲10.26
Registered electors		78,148		
Majority		11,745	18.70	▼6.46
DAP hold		Swing		
Source(s) "Federal Government Gazette - Notice of Contested Election, Parliament for the State of Perak [P.U. (B) 174/2013]" (PDF). Attorney General's Chambers of Malaysia. 26 April 2013. Archived from the original (PDF) on 2019-12-29. "Federal Government Gazette - Results of Contested Election and Statements of the Poll after the Official Addition of Votes, Parliamentary Constituencies for the State of Perak [P.U. (B) 215/2013]" (PDF). Attorney General's Chambers of Malaysia. 22 May 2013.

Malaysian general election, 2008
Party	Candidate	Votes	%	∆%
DAP	Nga Kor Ming	28,098	62.58	▲20.29
BN	M. Kayveas	16,800	37.42	▼9.99
Total valid votes		44,898	100.00	
Total rejected ballots		1,612		
Unreturned ballots		613		
Turnout		47,123	71.52	▲2.61
Registered electors		65,889		
Majority		11,298	25.16	▲20.04
DAP gain from BN		Swing		?

Malaysian general election, 2004
Party	Candidate	Votes	%	∆%
BN	M. Kayveas	20,129	47.41	▼6.24
DAP	Ong Chee Keng	17,957	42.29	▼2.67
PKR	Annah Dorai Pakiri	4,371	10.30	▲10.30
Total valid votes		42,457	100.00	
Total rejected ballots		1,337		
Unreturned ballots		1,027		
Turnout		44,821	68.91	▼0.08
Registered electors		65,042		
Majority		2,172	5.12	▼3.57
BN hold		Swing		

Malaysian general election, 1999
Party	Candidate	Votes	%	∆%
BN	Kerk Kim Tim @ Kerk Choo Ting	24,531	53.65	▼15.36
DAP	Lim Kean Ghee	20,562	44.96	▲44.96
MDP	Ng Hoe Hun	637	1.39	▲1.39
Total valid votes		45,730	100.00	
Total rejected ballots		1,587		
Unreturned ballots		3,492		
Turnout		50,809	68.99	▼1.14
Registered electors		73,646		
Majority		3,969	8.69	▼29.29
BN hold		Swing		

Malaysian general election, 1995
Party	Candidate	Votes	%	∆%
BN	Kerk Kim Tim @ Kerk Choo Ting	30,459	68.99	▲18.12
DAP	Haradeyan Singh @ Hardayal Singh	13,692	31.01	▼13.93
Total valid votes		44,151	100.00	
Total rejected ballots		2,130		
Unreturned ballots		1,649		
Turnout		47,930	70.13	▼1.01
Registered electors		68,344		
Majority		16,767	37.98	▲32.05
BN hold		Swing		

Malaysian general election, 1990
Party	Candidate	Votes	%	∆%
BN	Kerk Kim Tim @ Kerk Choo Ting	22,162	50.87	▼6.91
DAP	Kong Cheok Seng	19,577	44.94	▲2.72
Independent	Said Abu Hassan	1,827	4.19	▲4.19
Total valid votes		43,566	100.00	
Total rejected ballots		1,076		
Unreturned ballots		0		
Turnout		44,642	71.14	▲4.81
Registered electors		62,748		
Majority		2,585	5.93	▼9.63
BN hold		Swing		

Malaysian general election, 1986
Party	Candidate	Votes	%	∆%
BN	Paul Leong Khee Seong	20,969	57.78	▼8.26
DAP	Kong Cheok Seng	15,325	42.22	▲15.23
Total valid votes		36,294	100.00	
Total rejected ballots		1,249		
Unreturned ballots		0		
Turnout		37,543	66.33	▲7/79
Registered electors		56,599		
Majority		5,644	15.56	▼23.49
BN hold		Swing		

Malaysian general election, 1982
Party	Candidate	Votes	%	∆%
BN	Paul Leong Khee Seong	25,841	66.04	▲8.83
DAP	Kong Cheok Wan @ Kong Cheok Seng	10,563	26.99	▼8.28
PAS	Mohamed Junid	2,726	6.97	▼0.56
Total valid votes		39,130	100.00	
Total rejected ballots		1,024		
Unreturned ballots		0		
Turnout		40,154	74.12	▼5.60
Registered electors		54,176		
Majority		15,278	39.05	▲17.11
BN hold		Swing		

Malaysian general election, 1978
Party	Candidate	Votes	%	∆%
BN	Paul Leong Khee Seong	20,915	57.21	▲4.02
DAP	Loh Poh Seng	12,893	35.27	▼6.03
PAS	Abdul Samad Hussin	2,752	7.53	▲7.53
Total valid votes		36,560	100.00	
Total rejected ballots		1,033		
Unreturned ballots		0		
Turnout		37,593	79.72	▲4.10
Registered electors		47,154		
Majority		8,022	21.94	▲10.05
BN hold		Swing		

Malaysian general election, 1974
Party	Candidate	Votes	%
BN	Paul Leong Khee Seong	14,253	53.19
DAP	Loh Poh Seng	11,066	41.30
PEKEMAS	Chow Chong Leng	999	3.73
Homeland Consciousness Union	Ng Hoe Hun	479	1.79
Total valid votes		26,797	100.00
Total rejected ballots		725	
Unreturned ballots		0	
Turnout		27,522	75.62
Registered electors		36,394	
Majority		3,187	11.89
This was a new constituency created.
