= Jason Ng Thien Yeong =

Malaysian politician and lawyer

Yang Berhormat Tuan Jason Ng Thien Yeong MLA
- 黄天荣

Member of the Perak State Legislative Assembly for Astaka
- Incumbent
- Assumed office 19 November 2022
- Preceded by: Teoh Yee Chern (PH–DAP)
- Majority: 17,835 (2022)

Youth Head of the Public Policy Bureau of the Democratic Action Party
- Incumbent
- Assumed office 17 November 2024
- Secretary-General: Anthony Loke Siew Fook
- Youth Chief: Woo Kah Leong
- Preceded by: Michelle Ng Mei Sze

Personal details
- Born: Jason Ng Thien Yeong; 20 April 1992 (age 34) Sitiawan, Perak, Malaysia
- Citizenship: Malaysian
- Party: Democratic Action Party (DAP)
- Other political affiliations: Pakatan Harapan (PH)
- Education: Chinese National, Kampung Koh Chinese National Type School; Nan Hwa National Type Secondary School; Methodist National Secondary School, Sitiawan
- Alma mater: National University of Malaysia (LLB); University of Malaya (MPP)
- Occupation: Politician
- Profession: Lawyer
- Nickname: Chu Bak Yeong/Porky Yeong (猪肉荣)

Jason Ng Thien Yeong

Chinese name
- Traditional Chinese: 黃天榮
- Simplified Chinese: 黄天荣
Transcriptions
Standard Mandarin
- Hanyu Pinyin: Huáng Tiānróng

Jason Ng Thien Yeong (simplified Chinese: 黄天荣; traditional Chinese: 黃天榮; pinyin: Huáng Tiānróng; born 20 April 1992) is a Malaysian politician and lawyer who has served as Member of the Perak State Legislative Assembly (MLA) for Astaka since November 2022. He is a member of the Democratic Action Party (DAP), a component party of the Pakatan Harapan (PH) coalition. He has served as the Youth Head of the Public Policy Bureau of DAP since November 2024. He was Political Secretary to the Member of Parliament (MP) for Beruas Ngeh Koo Ham, State Head of the Legal Bureau of DAP of Perak, Branch Secretary of DAP of Sitiawan and Division Youth Secretary of DAP of Beruas.

== Member of the Perak State Legislative Assembly (since 2022) ==
In the 2022 Perak state election, Ng made his electoral debut after being nominated by PH to contest the Astaka state seat. Ng won the seat and was elected to the Perak State Legislative Assembly as the Astaka MLA after defeating Chieng Lee Chong of Barisan Nasional (BN) and Yong Il Yan of Perikatan Nasional (PN) by a majority of 17,835 votes.

== Background ==
Following the passing of his biological father, Jason Ng Thien Yeong was raised single-handedly by his mother, a Chinese primary school teacher who chose to keep her name private. As the only male child in the family, he developed a strong sense of responsibility and the value of gratitude ("remembering the source while drinking water") from a young age.

Before his political career, Jason Ng worked with his adoptive father, Datuk Ooi Jing Ting, selling pork in the Sitiawan and Kampung Koh areas, which earned him the nickname "Porky Yeong." He later advanced his studies at the National University of Malaysia (UKM) to earn a Bachelor of Laws (LL.B.) and became a practicing lawyer, while also completing a Master of Public Policy at the University of Malaya (UM). In August 2020, instead of following his adoptive father's footsteps into the Malaysian Chinese Association (MCA), Jason Ng joined the Democratic Action Party (DAP) and became the political secretary to Ngeh Koo Ham, the Member of Parliament for Beruas.

== Families ==
Born father: Mr Ng (unknown name) - Passed away when Jason Ng was just 9-year-old

Mother: (unknown name) - a Chinese primary school teacher

Foster father: Datuk Ooi Jing Ting - Malaysian Chinese Association Central Committee Member, Perak State Secretary, Beruas Division Chief

== Election results ==
Perak State Legislative Assembly
Year	Constituency	Candidate	Votes	Pct	Opponent(s)	Votes	Pct	Ballots cast	Majority	Turnout
2022	N38 Astaka	Jason Ng Thien Yeong (DAP)	21,128	78.16%	Chieng Lee Chong (MCA)	3,293	12.18%	27,033	17,835	65.54%
2022	N38 Astaka	Jason Ng Thien Yeong (DAP)	21,128	78.16%	Yong Il Yan (Gerakan)	2,612	9.66%	27,033	17,835	65.54%
