= Sham Mat Sahat =

Malaysian politician

Yang Berbahagia Dato' Sham Mat Sahat DPMP PJK PPN AMN
- شام محمد صحة

Member of the Perak State Legislative Assembly for Alor Pongsu
- In office 21 March 2004 – 19 November 2022
- Preceded by: Qamaruz Zaman Ismail
- Succeeded by: Noor Azman Ghazali (PN–BERSATU)

Personal details
- Born: Sham bin Mat Sahat
- Citizenship: Malaysian
- Party: UMNO
- Other political affiliations: Barisan Nasional
- Occupation: Politician

Sham bin Mat Sahat is a Malaysian politician. He was the Member of Perak State Legislative Assembly for Alor Pongsu from 2004 to 2022.

== Politics ==
He is the Chairman of UMNO Bagan Serai branch and was the political secretary for the Menteri Besar of Perak.

== Election results ==
Perak State Legislative Assembly
Year	Constituency	Candidate	Votes	Pct	Opponent(s)	Votes	Pct	Ballots cast	Majority	Turnout
2004	N10 Alor Pongsu	Sham Mat Sahat (UMNO)	7,112	63.29%	Hamzah Omri (PKR)	3,696	32.89%	11,238	3,416	72.19%
2008	N10 Alor Pongsu	Sham Mat Sahat (UMNO)	5,585	48.65%	Mohd Nasib Rahin (PKR)	5,490	47.82%	11,481	95	75.81%
2013	N10 Alor Pongsu	Sham Mat Sahat (UMNO)	8,286	55.83%	Rosli Ibrahim (PKR)	6,090	41.03%	14,841	2,196	84.00%
2013	N10 Alor Pongsu	Sham Mat Sahat (UMNO)	8,286	55.83%	Shamsul Amir Ramly (IND)	105	0.71%	14,841	2,196	84.00%
2018	N10 Alor Pongsu	Sham Mat Sahat (UMNO)	6,556	38.60%	Wan Ahmad Tarmizi Abdul Aziz (PAS)	5,394	31.76%	16,983	1,162	81.25%
2018	N10 Alor Pongsu	Sham Mat Sahat (UMNO)	6,556	38.60%	Ahmad Zaki Husin (PKR)	4,595	27.06%	16,983	1,162	81.25%
2022	N10 Alor Pongsu	Sham Mat Sahat (UMNO)	6,607	29.72%	Noor Azman Ghazali (BERSATU)	10,622	47.78%	22,582	4,015	78.80%
2022	N10 Alor Pongsu	Sham Mat Sahat (UMNO)	6,607	29.72%	Khairul Azman Ahmad (PKR)	5,004	22.51%	22,582	4,015	78.80%

== Honours ==
- Malaysia
  - Member of the Order of the Defender of the Realm (AMN) (2007)
  - Medal of the Order of the Defender of the Realm (PPN) (2003)
- Perak
  - Knight Commander of the Order of the Perak State Crown (DPMP) – Dato' (2011)
  - Recipient of the Meritorious Service Medal (PJK) (2003)
