= Astaka =

Political subdivision in Malaysia

Astaka (N38)
Perak constituency

State constituency
- Legislature: Perak State Legislative Assembly
MLA
Jason Ng Thien Yeong
PH
- Constituency created: 2018
- First contested: 2018
- Last contested: 2022

Demographics
- Electors (2022): 41,244

Astaka is a state constituency in Perak, Malaysia, that has been represented in the Perak State Legislative Assembly.

== Demographics ==
Ethnic breakdown of Astaka's electorate as of 2022
1. Chinese (70.3%)
2. Malay (14.6%)
3. Indian (13.5%)
4. Other ethnicities (1.53%)

== History ==
=== Polling districts ===
According to the federal gazette issued on 31 October 2022, the Astaka constituency is divided into 10 polling districts.

State constituency	Polling Districts	Code	Location
Astaka（N38）	Simpang Lima	068/38/01	SJK (C) Simpang Lima
Astaka（N38）	Pekan Gurney	068/38/02	SJK (C) Pekan Gurney
Astaka（N38）	Simpang Dua	068/38/03	SJK (C) Chien Hua
Astaka（N38）	Astaka	068/38/04	SMK Tok Perdana
Astaka（N38）	Sitiawan	068/38/05	SK Seri Selamat
Astaka（N38）	Taman Pegawai	068/38/06	SK St. Francis
Astaka（N38）	Kampong China Utara	068/38/07	SJK (C) Uk Ing
Astaka（N38）	Kampong China Selatan	068/38/08	SJK (C) Chinese National
Astaka（N38）	Kampong Koh Utara	068/38/09	SMJK Nan Hwa; SMK Methodist (ACS)
Astaka（N38）	Kampong Koh Selatan	068/38/10	SJK (C) Uk Dih; SK Methodist (ACS)

=== Representation history ===
Members of the Legislative Assembly for Astaka
Parliament	No	Years	Member	Party
Constituency created from Sitiawan
14th	N38	2018–2022	Teoh Yee Chern (张宇晨)	PH (DAP)
15th	N38	2022–present	Jason Ng Thien Yeong (黃天荣)	PH (DAP)

== Election results ==
Perak state election, 2022: Astaka
Party	Candidate	Votes	%	∆%
PH	Jason Ng Thien Yeong	21,128	78.16	▲78.16
BN	Chieng Lee Chong	3,293	12.18	▼4.02
PN	Yong Il Yan	2,612	9.66	▲9.66
Total valid votes		27,033	100.00	
Total rejected ballots		337		
Unreturned ballots		93		
Turnout		27,463	66.59	▼11.29
Registered electors		41,244		
Majority		17,835	65.98	▼1.62
PH hold		Swing		

Perak state election, 2018: Astaka
Party	Candidate	Votes	%
PKR	Teoh Yee Chern	18,814	83.80
BN	Teng Keek Soong	3,638	16.20
Total valid votes		22,452	98.27
Total rejected ballots		325	1.42
Unreturned ballots		70	0.31
Turnout		22,847	77.88
Registered electors		29,372	
Majority		15,176	67.60
This was a new constituency created.
Source(s) "RESULTS OF CONTESTED ELECTION AND STATEMENTS OF THE POLL AFTER THE OFFICIAL ADDITION OF VOTES".
