= Chenderoh (state constituency) =

Political subdivision in Malaysia

Chenderoh (N19)
Perak constituency

State constituency
- Legislature: Perak State Legislative Assembly
MLA
Syed Lukman Hakim
PN
- Constituency created: 2003
- First contested: 2004
- Last contested: 2018

Demographics
- Electors (2022): 17,782

Chenderoh is a state constituency in Perak, Malaysia, that has been represented in the Perak State Legislative Assembly.

== Demographics ==
Ethnic breakdown of Chenderoh's electorate as of 2022
1. Malay (81.2%)
2. Chinese (13.2%)
3. Indian (5.02%)
4. Other ethnicities (0.60%)

== History ==
=== Polling districts ===
According to the federal gazette issued on 31 October 2022, the Chenderoh constituency is divided into 17 polling districts.

State constituency	Polling Districts	Code	Location
Chenderoh (N19）	Jenalik	061/19/01	SK Jenalik
Chenderoh (N19）	Empangan Chenderoh	061/19/02	Dewan Kelab Kilat Chenderoh
Chenderoh (N19）	Sauk	061/19/03	SK Sauk
Chenderoh (N19）	Sauk Utara	061/19/04	SJK (C) Sauk
Chenderoh (N19）	Kampong Seterus	061/19/05	SJK (T) Ladang Kati
Chenderoh (N19）	Bendang Selinsing	061/19/06	SRA Rakyat Hidayah
Chenderoh (N19）	Chegar Galah	061/19/07	SK Chegar Galah
Chenderoh (N19）	Kampong Cheh	061/19/08	SK Cheh
Chenderoh (N19）	Kampong Chuar	061/19/09	SMK Temenggong
Chenderoh (N19）	Kati	061/19/10	SK Kati
Chenderoh (N19）	Berala	061/19/11	Al-Madrashah Al-Yasiniah Al-Islamiah Kampong Berala
Chenderoh (N19）	Lubok Chapin	061/19/12	SK Temong
Chenderoh (N19）	Changkat Jambu	061/19/13	SA Rakyat Nurul Liman
Chenderoh (N19）	Liman Kati	061/19/14	SJK (C) Liman
Chenderoh (N19）	Beluru	061/19/15	SK Beluru
Chenderoh (N19）	Kampong Jamuan	061/19/16	SMK Simpang Beluru
Chenderoh (N19）	Kota Lama Kiri	061/19/17	SK Padang Ampang

=== Representation history ===
Members of the Perak State Assembly for Chenderoh
Assembly	No	Years	Member	Party
Constituency created from Lubok Merbau and Lenggong
11th	N19	2004 – 2008	Siti Salmah Mat Jusak	BN (UMNO)
12th	N19	2008 – 2013	Siti Salmah Mat Jusak	BN (UMNO)
13th	N19	2013 – 2018	Zainun Mat Noor	BN (UMNO)
14th	N19	2018 – 2022	Zainun Mat Noor	BN (UMNO)
15th	N19	2022–present	Syed Lukman Hakim	PN (BERSATU)

== Election results ==
Perak state election, 2022
Party	Candidate	Votes	%	∆%
PN	Syed Lukman Hakim	5,342	39.44	▲39.44
BN	Khairuddin Mohamed Azahari	5,267	38.89	▼8.65
PH	Mohd Khairol Iwan	2,803	20.70	▲20.70
PEJUANG	Ahmad Rodzi Abdul Rahim	132	0.97	▲0.97
Total valid votes		13,712	100.00	
Total rejected ballots		141		
Unreturned ballots		27		
Turnout		13,380	77.11	▼5.17
Registered electors		17,782		
Majority		75	0.55	▼12.30
PN gain from BN		Swing		?

Perak state election, 2018
Party	Candidate	Votes	%	∆%
BN	Zainun Mat Noor	5,546	47.54	▼9.36
PKR	Khairul Anuar Musa	3,176	27.22	▲27.22
PAS	Mohammad Farid Faizi Azizan	2,944	25.24	▼17.86
Total valid votes		11,666	98.32	
Total rejected ballots		158	1.33	
Unreturned ballots		41	0.35	
Turnout		11,865	82.28	▼2.62
Registered electors		14,420		
Majority		2,370	12.85	▼0.95
BN hold		Swing		
Source(s) "RESULTS OF CONTESTED ELECTION AND STATEMENTS OF THE POLL AFTER THE OFFICIAL ADDITION OF VOTES".

Perak state election, 2013
Party	Candidate	Votes	%	∆%
BN	Zainun Mat Noor	6,457	56.90	▲0.91
PAS	Mohamad Azalan Mohamad Radzi	4,890	43.10	▼0.91
Total valid votes		11,347	98.17	
Total rejected ballots		196	1.70	
Unreturned ballots		16	0.14	
Turnout		11,559	84.90	▼9.74
Registered electors		13,617		
Majority		1,567	13.80	▲1.82
BN hold		Swing		
Source(s) "KEPUTUSAN PILIHAN RAYA UMUM DEWAN UNDANGAN NEGERI".

Perak state election, 2008
Party	Candidate	Votes	%	∆%
BN	Siti Salmah Mat Jusak	4,858	55.99	▼10.26
PAS	Mohammad Yassin Mohamed Yusof	3,819	44.01	▲10.26
Total valid votes		8,677	97.44	
Total rejected ballots		188	2.11	
Unreturned ballots		40	0.45	
Turnout		8,905	75.16	▼2.67
Registered electors		11,848		
Majority		1,039	11.98	▼20.52
BN hold		Swing		
Source(s) "KEPUTUSAN PILIHAN RAYA UMUM DEWAN UNDANGAN NEGERI PERAK BAGI TAHUN 2008".

Perak state election, 2004
Party	Candidate	Votes	%
BN	Siti Salmah Mat Jusak	5,761	66.25
PAS	Mohammad Yassin Mohamed Yusof	2,935	33.75
Total valid votes		8,696	97.83
Total rejected ballots		172	1.93
Unreturned ballots		21	0.24
Turnout		8,889	72.49
Registered electors		12,263	
Majority		2,826	32.50
This was a new constituency created.
Source(s) "KEPUTUSAN PILIHAN RAYA UMUM DEWAN UNDANGAN NEGERI PERAK BAGI TAHUN 2004".
