= Tan Keng Liang =

Malaysian politician

- 陈庆亮

Personal details
- Born: 14 November 1977 (age 48) Alor Setar, Kedah, Malaysia
- Party: Gerakan - Perikatan Nasional
- Occupation: Politician
- Profession: Lawyer

Chinese name
- Traditional Chinese: 陳慶亮
- Simplified Chinese: 陈庆亮
- Hanyu Pinyin: Chén Qìngliàng
- Hokkien POJ: Tân Khìngliāng

Tan Keng Liang (simplified Chinese: 陈庆亮; traditional Chinese: 陳慶亮; pinyin: Chén Qìngliàng; born 14 November 1977), is a politician in Malaysia but has not been elected in either State or Parliament Seats, who is currently the Parti Gerakan Rakyat Malaysia (Gerakan) Youth Chief. Gerakan is a component of Malaysia's previous ruling coalition, Barisan Nasional (BN). He won the election for the post of Gerakan Youth head for the 2013/2016 session at the Gerakan Youth and Wanita wings' conference defeating Oh Tong Keong.

Over the usage of the word "Allah" in The Herald, he said the Barisan Nasional supreme council should also convene an emergency meeting as soon as possible to resolve the dispute once and for all. He urged the Barisan Nasional supreme council to take a firm and fair stand on the "Allah" issue soon and wants BN leadership to reach an amicable solution to resolve the contentious matter after seeking views of all its 13 component parties. He said this in an e-statement in response to the Court of Appeal (COA) decision to stop the Catholic weekly periodical The Herald from using the term "Allah" in its Bahasa Malaysia publication as a reference to "God".

== Election results ==
Parliament of Malaysia
Year	Constituency	Candidate	Votes	Pct	Opponent(s)	Votes	Pct	Ballots cast	Majority	Turnout
2018	P060 Taiping	Tan Keng Liang (Gerakan)	15,613	22.39%	Teh Kok Lim (DAP)	42,997	61.65%	69,743	27,384	78.60%
2018	P060 Taiping	Tan Keng Liang (Gerakan)	15,613	22.39%	Ibrahim Ismail (PAS)	11,133	15.96%	69,743	27,384	78.60%
