= Alor Pongsu (state constituency) =

Electoral district in Perak, Malaysia

Alor Pongsu (N10)
Perak constituency

State constituency
- Legislature: Perak State Legislative Assembly
MLA
Noor Azman Ghazali
PN
- Constituency created: 1974
- First contested: 1974
- Last contested: 2022

Demographics
- Electors (2022): 28,656

Alor Pongsu is a state constituency in Perak, Malaysia, that has been represented in the Perak State Legislative Assembly.

== Demographics ==
Ethnic breakdown of Alor Pongsu's electorate as of 2022
1. Malay (75.7%)
2. Indian (13.8%)
3. Chinese (10.3%)
4. Other ethnicities (0.30%)

== History ==
=== Polling districts ===
According to the federal gazette issued on 31 October 2022, the Alor Pongsu constituency is divided into 17 polling districts.

State constituency	Polling Districts	Code	Location
Alor Pongsu (N10）	Simpang Lima	058/10/01	SJK (T) Simpang Lima
Alor Pongsu (N10）	Ladang Tali Ayer	058/10/02	SK Tanah Kebun
Alor Pongsu (N10）	Jalan Baharu	058/10/03	SK Jalan Baharu
Alor Pongsu (N10）	Parit Haji Amin	058/10/04	SK Jalan Baharu
Alor Pongsu (N10）	Kedai Dua	058/10/05	SRA Rakyat Al-Amaniah
Alor Pongsu (N10）	Pandak Puteh	058/10/06	SMK Sri Kurau
Alor Pongsu (N10）	Ladang Chersonese	058/10/07	SJK (T) Ladang Chersonese
Alor Pongsu (N10）	Ladang Gula	058/10/08	SJK (T) Ladang Gula
Alor Pongsu (N10）	Sungai Dungun	058/10/09	Dewan Serbaguna Bagan Serai, Taman Serai Permai
Alor Pongsu (N10）	Ladang Lian Seng	058/10/10	SK Matang Gerdu
Alor Pongsu (N10）	Jin Seng	058/10/11	SMK Sri Kurau
Alor Pongsu (N10）	Matang Gerdu	058/10/12	SK Matang Gerdu
Alor Pongsu (N10）	Sungai Bogak	058/10/13	SK Sungai Bogak
Alor Pongsu (N10）	Matang Jelutong	058/10/14	SK Matang Jelutong
Alor Pongsu (N10）	Parit Simpang Lima	058/10/15	SK Alor Pongsu
Alor Pongsu (N10）	Alor Pongsu	058/11/16	SK Alor Pongsu
Alor Pongsu (N10）	Changkat Lobak	058/11/17	SK Changkat Lobak

=== Representation history ===
Member of Perak State Legislative Assembly for Alor Pongsu
Assembly	No	Years	Member	Party
Constituency created from Bagan Serai and Gunong Semanggol
4th	N07	1974	Masud Untoi	BN (UMNO)
4th	N07	1974 – 1978	Mohamed Abas	BN (UMNO)
5th	N07	1978 – 1982	Mohamed Abas	BN (UMNO)
6th	N07	1982 – 1986	Mohamed Abas	BN (UMNO)
7th	N07	1986 – 1990	Mohamed Abas	BN (UMNO)
8th	N07	1990 – 1995	Mohamed Abas	BN (UMNO)
9th	N08	1995 – 1999	Baharudin Mat Nor	BN (UMNO)
10th	N08	1999 – 2004	Qamaruz Zaman Ismail	BN (UMNO)
11th	N10	2004 – 2008	Sham Mat Sahat	BN (UMNO)
12th	N10	2008 – 2013	Sham Mat Sahat	BN (UMNO)
13th	N10	2013 – 2018	Sham Mat Sahat	BN (UMNO)
14th	N10	2018 – 2022	Sham Mat Sahat	BN (UMNO)
15th	N10	2022–present	Noor Azman Ghazali	PN (BERSATU)

== Election results ==
Perak state election, 2022
Party	Candidate	Votes	%	∆%
PN	Noor Azman Ghazali	10,622	47.78	▲47.78
BN	Sham Mat Sahat	6,607	29.72	▼9.91
PH	Khairul Azman Ahmad	5,004	22.51	▲22.51
Total valid votes		22,233	100.00	
Total rejected ballots		337		
Unreturned ballots		12		
Turnout		22,582	78.80	▼2.45
Registered electors		28,656		
Majority		4,015	18.06	▲11.03
PN gain from BN		Swing		?

Perak state election, 2018
Party	Candidate	Votes	%	∆%
BN	Sham Mat Sahat	6,556	39.63	▼17.59
PAS	Wan Tarmizi	5,394	32.60	▲32.60
PKR	Ahmad Zaki Husin	4,595	27.77	▼14.29
Total valid votes		16,545	97.42	
Total rejected ballots		336	1.98	
Unreturned ballots		102	0.60	
Turnout		16,983	81.25	▼2.75
Registered electors		20,901		
Majority		1,162	7.03	▼8.13
BN hold		Swing		
Source(s) "RESULTS OF CONTESTED ELECTION AND STATEMENTS OF THE POLL AFTER THE OFFICIAL ADDITION OF VOTES".

Perak state election, 2013
Party	Candidate	Votes	%	∆%
BN	Sham Mat Sahat	8,286	57.22	▲6.79
PKR	Rosli Ibrahim	6,090	42.06	▼7.51
Independent	Shamsul Amir Ramly	105	0.73	▲0.73
Total valid votes		14,481	97.57	
Total rejected ballots		339	2.28	
Unreturned ballots		21	0.14	
Turnout		14,841	84.00	▲8.19
Registered electors		17,666		
Majority		2,196	15.16	▲14.30
BN hold		Swing		
Source(s) "KEPUTUSAN PILIHAN RAYA UMUM DEWAN UNDANGAN NEGERI".

Perak state election, 2008
Party	Candidate	Votes	%	∆%
BN	Sham Mat Sahat	5,585	50.43	▼15.37
PKR	Mohd Nasib Rahin	5,490	49.57	▲15.37
Total valid votes		11,075	96.46	
Total rejected ballots		391	3.41	
Unreturned ballots		15	0.13	
Turnout		11,481	75.81	▼3.62
Registered electors		15,144		
Majority		95	0.86	▼30.75
BN hold		Swing		
Source(s) "KEPUTUSAN PILIHAN RAYA UMUM DEWAN UNDANGAN NEGERI PERAK BAGI TAHUN 2008".

Perak state election, 2004
Party	Candidate	Votes	%	∆%
BN	Sham Mat Sahat	7,112	65.80	▲8.57
PKR	Hamzah Omri	3,696	34.19	▼8.57
Total valid votes		10,808	96.17	
Total rejected ballots		417	3.71	
Unreturned ballots		13	0.12	
Turnout		11,238	72.19	▲8.38
Registered electors		15,567		
Majority		3,416	31.61	▲17.15
BN hold		Swing		
Source(s) "KEPUTUSAN PILIHAN RAYA UMUM DEWAN UNDANGAN NEGERI PERAK BAGI TAHUN 2004".

Perak state election, 1999
Party	Candidate	Votes	%	∆%
BN	Qamaruz Zaman Ismail	7,005	57.23	▼15.99
PKR	Mustaffa Kamil Ayub	5,236	42.77	▲42.77
Total valid votes		12,241	95.57	
Total rejected ballots		561	4.38	
Unreturned ballots		7	0.05	
Turnout		12,809	63.81	▼2.61
Registered electors		20,073		
Majority		1,769	14.46	▼31.98
BN hold		Swing		
Source(s) "KEPUTUSAN PILIHAN RAYA UMUM DEWAN UNDANGAN NEGERI PERAK BAGI TAHUN 1999".

Perak state election, 1995
Party	Candidate	Votes	%	∆%
BN	Baharudin Mat Nor	8,693	73.22	▲10.35
PAS	Sabran Hasamawi	3,179	26.78	▼10.35
Total valid votes		11,872	95.20	
Total rejected ballots		505	4.05	
Unreturned ballots		94	0.75	
Turnout		12,471	66.42	▼3.42
Registered electors		18,776		
Majority		5,514	46.44	▲20.70
BN hold		Swing		
Source(s) "KEPUTUSAN PILIHAN RAYA UMUM DEWAN UNDANGAN NEGERI PERAK BAGI TAHUN 1995".

Perak state election, 1990
Party	Candidate	Votes	%	∆%
BN	Mohamed Abas	7,381	62.87	▲3.45
PAS	Rahmat Husin	4,360	37.13	▼3.45
Total valid votes		11,741	94.89	
Total rejected ballots		632	5.11	
Unreturned ballots		0	0.00	
Turnout		12,373	69.84	▲2.77
Registered electors		17,717		
Majority		3,021	25.74	▲6.90
BN hold		Swing		
Source(s) "KEPUTUSAN PILIHAN RAYA UMUM DEWAN UNDANGAN NEGERI PERAK BAGI TAHUN 1990".

Perak state election, 1986
Party	Candidate	Votes	%	∆%
BN	Mohamed Abas	6,907	59.42	
PAS	Halim Mohd Ali	4,718	40.58	
Total valid votes		11,625	95.38	
Total rejected ballots		563	4.62	
Unreturned ballots		0	0.00	
Turnout		12,188	67.07	
Registered electors		18,171		
Majority		2,189	18.84	
BN hold		Swing		
Source(s) "KEPUTUSAN PILIHAN RAYA UMUM DEWAN UNDANGAN NEGERI PERAK BAGI TAHUN 1986".
