= Lubok Merbau =

Political subdivision in Malaysia

Lubok Merbau (N20)
Perak constituency

State constituency
- Legislature: Perak State Legislative Assembly
MLA
Azizi Mohamed Ridzuan
PN
- Constituency created: 1974
- First contested: 1974
- Last contested: 2022

Demographics
- Electors (2022): 20,904

Lubok Merbau is a state constituency in Perak, Malaysia, that has been represented in the Perak State Legislative Assembly.

== Demographics ==
Ethnic breakdown of Lubok Merbau's electorate as of 2022
1. Malay (75.2%)
2. Chinese (16.1%)
3. Indian (8.16%)
4. Other ethnicities (0.55%)

== History ==
=== Polling districts ===
According to the federal gazette issued on 31 October 2022, the Lubok Merbau constituency is divided into 14 polling districts.

State constituency	Polling Districts	Code	Location
Lubok Merbau (N20)	Kampong Laneh	061/20/01	SK Laneh
Lubok Merbau (N20)	Kroh Hilir	061/20/02	SK Paya Salak
Lubok Merbau (N20)	Padang Rengas	061/20/03	SK Perempuan
Lubok Merbau (N20)	Padang Rengas Utara	061/20/04	SJK (C) Khiu Min
Lubok Merbau (N20)	Kampong Jaya	061/20/05	SK Tun Dr Ismail
Lubok Merbau (N20)	Kampong Buaya	061/20/06	Kolej Vokesional Kuala Kangsar
Lubok Merbau (N20)	Kampong Paya	061/20/07	SRA Rakyat Al-Musonifiah
Lubok Merbau (N20)	Kampong Lalang	061/20/08	SMA Ad-Diniah Al-Islamiah
Lubok Merbau (N20)	Padang Assam	061/20/09	SK Padang Assam
Lubok Merbau (N20)	Kampong Rambong	061/20/10	SK Syiekh Mohd. Idris Al-Marbawi
Lubok Merbau (N20)	Lubok Merbau	061/20/11	SK Syeikh Mohd. Idris Al-Marbawi
Lubok Merbau (N20)	Kampong Tanah Merah	061/20/12	SK Tanah Merah
Lubok Merbau (N20)	Kampong Station	061/20/13	SRA Rakyat An-Nur
Lubok Merbau (N20)	Kampong Basong	061/20/14	SK Clifford

=== Representation history ===
Members of the Legislative Assembly for Lubok Merbau
Assembly	No	Years	Name	Party
Constituency created from Padang Rengas and Sanggang
4th	N16	1974-1978	Mohamed Junid	BN (PAS)
5th	N16	1978-1982	Mior Aris Mior Abu Bakar	BN (UMNO)
6th	N16	1982-1986	Mior Aris Mior Abu Bakar	BN (UMNO)
7th	N14	1986-1990	Mior Aris Mior Abu Bakar	BN (UMNO)
8th	N14	1990-1995	Hamzah Mohd Zain	BN (UMNO)
9th	N17	1995-1999	Jamal Nasir Rasdi	BN (UMNO)
10th	N17	1999-2004	Jamal Nasir Rasdi	BN (UMNO)
11th	N20	2004-2008	Jamal Nasir Rasdi	BN (UMNO)
12th	N20	2008-2013	Mohd Zainudin Mohd Yusof	PR (PAS)
13th	N20	2013-2018	Siti Salmah Mat Jusak	BN (UMNO)
14th	N20	2018-2022	Jurij Jalaluddin	BN (UMNO)
15th	N20	2022–present	Azizi Mohamed Ridzuan	PN (PAS)

== Election results ==
Perak state election, 2022: Lubok Merbau
Party	Candidate	Votes	%	∆%
PN	Azizi Mohamed Ridzuan	7,722	47.17	▲47.17
BN	Mohamad Azir Ismail	4,767	29.12	▼7.01
PH	Zaiton Latiff	3,880	23.70	▲23.70
Total valid votes		16,604	100.00	
Total rejected ballots		199		
Unreturned ballots		36		
Turnout		16,839	79.43	▼4.03
Registered electors		20,904		
Majority		2,955	18.05	▲15.03
PN gain from BN		Swing		?

Perak state election, 2018: Lubok Merbau
Party	Candidate	Votes	%	∆%
BN	Jurij Jalaluddin	4,908	36.13	▼14.08
PAS	Azizi Mohamed Ridzuwan	4,499	33.11	▼16.68
PKR	Zulkarnine Hashim	4,179	30.76	▲30.76
Total valid votes		13,586	98.20	
Total rejected ballots		181	1.31	
Unreturned ballots		68	0.49	
Turnout		13,835	83.46	▼1.54
Registered electors		16,576		
Majority		409	3.02	▲2.60
BN hold		Swing		
Source(s) "RESULTS OF CONTESTED ELECTION AND STATEMENTS OF THE POLL AFTER THE OFFICIAL ADDITION OF VOTES".

Perak state election, 2013: Lubok Merbau
Party	Candidate	Votes	%	∆%
BN	Siti Salmah Mat Jusak	6,261	50.21	▲0.60
PAS	Mohd Zainudin Mohd Yusof	6,208	49.79	▼0.60
Total valid votes		12,469	98.41	
Total rejected ballots		178	1.40	
Unreturned ballots		24	0.19	
Turnout		12,671	85.00	▲9.74
Registered electors		14,901		
Majority		53	0.42	▼0.36
BN gain from PAS		Swing		?
Source(s) "KEPUTUSAN PILIHAN RAYA UMUM DEWAN UNDANGAN NEGERI".

Perak state election, 2008: Lubok Merbau
Party	Candidate	Votes	%	∆%
PAS	Mohd Zainudin Mohd Yusof	4,664	50.39	▲15.86
BN	Jamal Nasir Rasdi	4,592	49.61	▼15.86
Total valid votes		9,256	98.01	
Total rejected ballots		150	1.59	
Unreturned ballots		38	0.40	
Turnout		9,444	75.26	▲2.77
Registered electors		12,549		
Majority		72	0.78	▼31.72
PAS gain from BN		Swing		?
Source(s) "KEPUTUSAN PILIHAN RAYA UMUM DEWAN UNDANGAN NEGERI PERAK BAGI TAHUN 2008".

Perak state election, 2004: Lubok Merbau
Party	Candidate	Votes	%	∆%
BN	Jamal Nasir Rasdi	5,761	66.25	▲11.91
PAS	Mohd Zainudin Mohd Yusof	2,935	33.75	▼11.91
Total valid votes		8,696	97.83	
Total rejected ballots		172	1.93	
Unreturned ballots		21	0.24	
Turnout		8,889	72.49	▲6.62
Registered electors		12,263		
Majority		2,826	32.50	▲23.82
BN hold		Swing		
Source(s) "KEPUTUSAN PILIHAN RAYA UMUM DEWAN UNDANGAN NEGERI PERAK BAGI TAHUN 2004".

Perak state election, 1999: Lubok Merbau
Party	Candidate	Votes	%	∆%
BN	Jamal Nasir Rasdi	6,707	54.34	▼18.74
PAS	Abdul Munim Mohamad Zain	5,636	45.66	▲18.74
Total valid votes		12,343	97.37	
Total rejected ballots		293	2.31	
Unreturned ballots		40	0.32	
Turnout		12,676	65.87	▼1.17
Registered electors		19,244		
Majority		1,071	8.68	▼37.48
BN hold		Swing		
Source(s) "KEPUTUSAN PILIHAN RAYA UMUM DEWAN UNDANGAN NEGERI PERAK BAGI TAHUN 1999".

Perak state election, 1995: Lubok Merbau
Party	Candidate	Votes	%	∆%
BN	Jamal Nasir Rasdi	8,628	73.08	▲7.48
PAS	Abdul Munim Mohamad Zain	3,179	26.92	▼7.48
Total valid votes		11,807	96.85	
Total rejected ballots		315	2.58	
Unreturned ballots		69	0.57	
Turnout		12,191	67.04	▼1.85
Registered electors		18,185		
Majority		5,449	46.16	▲14.96
BN hold		Swing		
Source(s) "KEPUTUSAN PILIHAN RAYA UMUM DEWAN UNDANGAN NEGERI PERAK BAGI TAHUN 1995".

Perak state election, 1990: Lubok Merbau
Party	Candidate	Votes	%	∆%
BN	Jamal Nasir Rasdi	7,453	65.60	▲0.30
PAS	Hilmi	3,909	34.40	▼0.30
Total valid votes		11,362	96.61	
Total rejected ballots		399	3.39	
Unreturned ballots		0	0	
Turnout		11,761	68.89	▲3.82
Registered electors		17,072		
Majority		3,544	31.20	▲0.60
BN hold		Swing		
Source(s) "KEPUTUSAN PILIHAN RAYA UMUM DEWAN UNDANGAN NEGERI PERAK BAGI TAHUN 1990".

Perak state election, 1986: Lubok Merbau
Party	Candidate	Votes	%	∆%
BN	Hamzah Mohd Zain	6,788	65.30	▲2.97
PAS	Yunus	3,607	34.70	▼2.97
Total valid votes		10,395	100.00	
Total rejected ballots		353		
Unreturned ballots		0		
Turnout		10,748	65.07	▼8.80
Registered electors		16,517		
Majority		3,181	30.60	▲5.94
BN hold		Swing		
Source(s) "KEPUTUSAN PILIHAN RAYA UMUM DEWAN UNDANGAN NEGERI PERAK BAGI TAHUN 1986".

Perak state election, 1982: Lubok Merbau
Party	Candidate	Votes	%	∆%
BN	Mior Aris Mior Abu Bakar	5,986	62.33	▲7.95
PAS	Abdul Samad Mohammad Noh	3,618	37.67	▼4.16
Total valid votes		9,604	100.00	
Total rejected ballots		296		
Unreturned ballots		0		
Turnout		9,900	73.88	▼3.05
Registered electors		13,401		
Majority		2,368	24.66	▲12.11
BN hold		Swing		

Perak state election, 1978: Lubok Merbau
Party	Candidate	Votes	%	∆%
BN	Mior Aris Mior Abu Bakar	4,751	54.38	▲54.38
PAS	Mohamad Junid	3,655	41.83	▼40.00
DAP	Abdul Karim Lan	331	3.79	▼14.38
Total valid votes		8,737	100.00	
Total rejected ballots		508		
Unreturned ballots		0		
Turnout		9,245	76.93	▲2.69
Registered electors		12,018		
Majority		1,096	12.54	▼51.13
BN hold		Swing		

Perak state election, 1974: Lubok Merbau
Party	Candidate	Votes	%
BN	Mohamad Junid	6,704	81.84
DAP	Abdul Karim Lan	1,488	18.16
Total valid votes		8,192	100.00
Total rejected ballots		226	
Unreturned ballots		0	
Turnout		8,418	74.24
Registered electors		11,339	
Majority		5,216	63.67
This was a new constituency created.

== Sources ==
- "14th General Election Malaysia (GE14 / PRU14) - Perak". election.thestar.com.my.
