= Jurij Jalaluddin =

Malaysian politician

Jurij Jalaluddin AMP PPT
- جريج جلال الدين

Member of the Perak State Legislative Assembly for Lubok Merbau
- In office 2018–2022
- Preceded by: Siti Salmah Mat Jusak

Personal details
- Born: Jurij bin Jalaluddin Padang Rengas, Perak
- Citizenship: Malaysian
- Party: UMNO
- Other political affiliations: Barisan Nasional
- Education: National University of Malaysia
- Occupation: Politician

Jurij bin Jalaluddin is a Malaysian politician from UMNO. He has been the Member of Perak State Legislative Assembly for Lubok Merbau from 2018 to November 2022.

== Education ==
He has studied at Clifford School Kuala Kangsar and is a Bachelor of Business Administration and Doctor of Philosophy (PhD) from National University of Malaysia.

== Politics ==
He is the former Senior Private Secretary of the Ministry of Tourism, Arts and Culture Malaysia.

== Election results ==
Perak State Legislative Assembly
| Year | Constituency | Candidate | Votes | Pct | Opponent(s) | Votes | Pct | Ballots cast | Majority | Turnout |
|---|---|---|---|---|---|---|---|---|---|---|
| 2018 | N20 Lubok Merbau | Jurij Jalaluddin (UMNO) | 4,908 | 35.48% | Azizi Mohamed Ridzuwan (PAS) | 4,499 | 32.52% | 13,835 | 409 | 83.46% |
| 2018 | N20 Lubok Merbau | Jurij Jalaluddin (UMNO) | 4,908 | 35.48% | Zulkarnine Hashim (BERSATU) | 4,179 | 30.21% | 13,835 | 409 | 83.46% |

== Honours ==
- Perak
  - Recipient of the Distinguished Conduct Medal (PPT) (2002)
  - Member of the Order of the Perak State Crown (AMP) (2015)
