= Pokok Assam (state constituency) =

Political subdivision in Malaysia

Pokok Assam (N17)
Perak constituency

State constituency
- Legislature: Perak State Legislative Assembly
MLA
Ong Seng Guan
PH
- Constituency created: 1995
- First contested: 1995
- Last contested: 2022

Demographics
- Electors (2022): 36,513

Pokok Assam is a state constituency in Perak, Malaysia, that has been represented in the Perak State Legislative Assembly.

== Demographics ==
Ethnic breakdown of Pokok Assam's electorate as of 2022
1. Chinese (62.9%)
2. Malay (23.9%)
3. Indian (11.2%)
4. Other ethnicities (2.04%)

== History ==
=== Polling districts ===
According to the federal gazette issued on 31 October 2022, the Pokok Assam constituency is divided into 16 polling districts.

| State constituency | Polling Districts | Code | Location |
|---|---|---|---|
| Pokok Assam (N17） | Pokok Assam | 060/17/01 | SK Methodist; SRA Rakyat Al-Ihsaniah |
| Pokok Assam (N17） | Kampong Aman | 060/17/02 | SK Seri Aman |
| Pokok Assam (N17） | Sekolah | 060/17/03 | Dewan Pokok Assam Tambahan |
| Pokok Assam (N17） | Jalan Raja Muda | 060/17/04 | SJK (C) Pokok Assam |
| Pokok Assam (N17） | Pasar | 060/17/05 | SJK (C) Pokok Asaam |
| Pokok Assam (N17） | Sungai Tupai | 060/17/06 | SJK (C) Pokok Asaam |
| Pokok Assam (N17） | Simpang Road | 060/17/07 | Dewan Sri Kota |
| Pokok Assam (N17） | Kota Road | 060/17/08 | SJK (T) YMHA |
| Pokok Assam (N17） | Market Street | 060/17/09 | SK St George 1 |
| Pokok Assam (N17） | Theatre Road | 060/17/10 | SMK Convent |
| Pokok Assam (N17） | Tupai Lane | 060/17/11 | SJK (C) Hua Lian (3) |
| Pokok Assam (N17） | Tupai | 060/17/12 | SMK Kampung Jambu |
| Pokok Assam (N17） | Cotonation Road | 060/17/13 | SMK Taman Tasik |
| Pokok Assam (N17） | Birch Village | 060/17/14 | Sekolah Tinggi Hua Lian |
| Pokok Assam (N17） | Eastern Road | 060/17/15 | Sekolah Tinggi Hua Lian |
| Pokok Assam (N17） | Museum | 060/17/16 | SMK (P) Treacher Methodist |

=== Representation history ===
Members of the Legislative Assembly for Pokok Assam
| Assembly | No | Years | Name | Party |
Constituency created from Asam Kumbang, Changkat Jering and Kamunting
| 9th | N14 | 1995-1999 | Ho Cheng Wang (何章兴) | BN (MCA) |
| 10th | N14 | 1999-2004 | Ho Cheng Wang (何章兴) | BN (MCA) |
| 11th | N17 | 2004-2008 | Ho Cheng Wang (何章兴) | BN (MCA) |
| 12th | N17 | 2008-2013 | Yee Seu Kai (余兆佳) | PR (DAP) |
| 13th | N17 | 2013-2018 | Teh Kok Lim (郑国霖) | PR (DAP) |
| 14th | N17 | 2018-2022 | Leow Thye Yih (廖泰义) | PH (DAP) |
| 15th | N17 | 2022–present | Ong Seng Guan (王星元) | PH (DAP) |

== Election results ==
Perak state election, 2022
| Party | Candidate | Votes | % | ∆% |
|---|---|---|---|---|
| PH | Ong Seng Guan | 16,726 | 67.36 | ▲67.36 |
| PN | Shariful Juhari Abu Kassim | 4,546 | 18.31 | ▲18.31 |
| BN | Ang Sui Eng | 2,660 | 10.71 | ▼11.79 |
| Independent | Leow Thye Yih | 786 | 3.17 | ▲3.17 |
| Independent | Mohd Yusoff Abdul Hamid | 111 | 0.45 | ▲0.45 |
| Total valid votes | | 25,101 | 100.00 | |
| Total rejected ballots | | 196 | | |
| Unreturned ballots | | 76 | | |
| Turnout | | 25,373 | 68.75 | ▼9.63 |
| Registered electors | | 36,513 | | |
| Majority | | 12,180 | 49.05 | ▼5.95 |
| PH hold | | Swing | | |

Perak state election, 2018
| Party | Candidate | Votes | % | ∆% |
|---|---|---|---|---|
| PKR | Leow Thye Yih | 16,954 | 77.50 | ▲77.50 |
| BN | Lee Li Kuan | 4,922 | 22.50 | ▼5.81 |
| Total valid votes | | 21,876 | 97.62 | |
| Total rejected ballots | | 418 | 1.87 | |
| Unreturned ballots | | 115 | 0.51 | |
| Turnout | | 22,409 | 78.38 | ▼2.22 |
| Registered electors | | 28,590 | | |
| Majority | | 12,032 | 55.00 | ▲10.54 |
| PKR hold | | Swing | | |
Source(s) "RESULTS OF CONTESTED ELECTION AND STATEMENTS OF THE POLL AFTER THE OFFICIAL ADDITION OF VOTES".

Perak state election, 2013
| Party | Candidate | Votes | % | ∆% |
|---|---|---|---|---|
| DAP | Teh Kok Lim | 12,780 | 71.69 | ▲18.66 |
| BN | Ho Cheng Wang | 4,855 | 27.23 | ▼19.74 |
| Independent | Mohd Yusoff Abdull Hamid | 192 | 1.08 | ▲1.07 |
| Total valid votes | | 17,827 | 98.94 | |
| Total rejected ballots | | 159 | 0.88 | |
| Unreturned ballots | | 32 | 0.18 | |
| Turnout | | 18,018 | 80.60 | ▲10.41 |
| Registered electors | | 22,360 | | |
| Majority | | 7,925 | 44.46 | ▲38.40 |
| DAP hold | | Swing | | |
Source(s) "KEPUTUSAN PILIHAN RAYA UMUM DEWAN UNDANGAN NEGERI".

Perak state election, 2008
| Party | Candidate | Votes | % | |
|---|---|---|---|---|
| DAP | Yee Seu Kai | 7,574 | 53.03 | |
| BN | Ho Cheng Wang | 6,709 | 46.97 | |
| Total valid votes | | 14,283 | 98.25 | |
| Total rejected ballots | | 228 | 1.57 | |
| Unreturned ballots | | 27 | 0.19 | |
| Turnout | | 14,538 | 70.19 | |
| Registered electors | | 20,711 | | |
| Majority | | 865 | 6.06 | |
| DAP gain from BN | | Swing | | ? |
Source(s) "KEPUTUSAN PILIHAN RAYA UMUM DEWAN UNDANGAN NEGERI PERAK BAGI TAHUN 2008".

Perak state election, 2004
| Party | Candidate | Votes | % | ∆% |
|---|---|---|---|---|
On the nomination day, Ho Cheng Wang won uncontested.
| BN | Ho Cheng Wang | | 100.00 | |
| Total valid votes | | | | |
| Total rejected ballots | | | | |
| Unreturned ballots | | | | |
| Turnout | | | | |
| Registered electors | | 21,500 | | |
| Majority | | | | |
| BN hold | | Swing | | |
Source(s) "KEPUTUSAN PILIHAN RAYA UMUM DEWAN UNDANGAN NEGERI PERAK BAGI TAHUN 2004".

Perak state election, 1999
| Party | Candidate | Votes | % | ∆% |
|---|---|---|---|---|
| BN | Ho Cheng Wang | 11,324 | 66.44 | ▲2.06 |
| DAP | Mah Om Ching | 5,575 | 32.71 | ▼2.91 |
| MDP | Ng Hoe Hun | 145 | 0.85 | ▲0.82 |
| Total valid votes | | 17,044 | 96.14 | |
| Total rejected ballots | | 391 | 2.21 | |
| Unreturned ballots | | 293 | 1.65 | |
| Turnout | | 17,728 | 63.81 | ▼2.52 |
| Registered electors | | 27,783 | | |
| Majority | | 5,749 | 33.73 | ▲4.97 |
| BN hold | | Swing | | |
Source(s) "KEPUTUSAN PILIHAN RAYA UMUM DEWAN UNDANGAN NEGERI PERAK BAGI TAHUN 1999".

Perak state election, 1995
| Party | Candidate | Votes | % |
|---|---|---|---|
| BN | Ho Cheng Wang | 10,807 | 64.38 |
| DAP | Lim Yan Chiow | 5,979 | 35.62 |
| Total valid votes | | 16,786 | 97.09 |
| Total rejected ballots | | 461 | 2.67 |
| Unreturned ballots | | 42 | 0.24 |
| Turnout | | 17,289 | 66.33 |
| Registered electors | | 26,065 | |
| Majority | | 4,828 | 28.76 |
This was a new constituency created.
Source(s) "KEPUTUSAN PILIHAN RAYA UMUM DEWAN UNDANGAN NEGERI PERAK BAGI TAHUN 1995".
