= Manong (state constituency) =

State constituency in Perak, Malaysia

Manong (N35)
Perak constituency

State constituency
- Legislature: Perak State Legislative Assembly
MLA
Burhanuddin Ahmad
PN
- Constituency created: 1974
- First contested: 1974
- Last contested: 2022

Demographics
- Electors (2022): 24,791

Manong is a state constituency in Perak, Malaysia, that has been represented in the Perak State Legislative Assembly from 1974 to 1986, from 1995 to present.

The state constituency was created in the 1974 redistribution and is mandated to return a single member to the Perak State Legislative Assembly under the first past the post voting system.

== Demographics ==
Ethnic breakdown of Manong's electorate as of 2022
1. Malay (71.8%)
2. Chinese (20.4%)
3. Indian (6.71%)
4. Other ethnicities (1.06%)

== History ==
It was abolished in 1986 when it was redistributed. It was re-created in 1994.

2004–2016: The constituency contains the polling districts of Taman Bunga Raya, Talang Hulu, Jalan Baharu, Bendang Panjang, Jerlun, Kampong Mesjid, Kampong Ketior, Ulu Kenas, Lempor, Kampong Jeliang, Manong, Kampong Semat, Ulu Piol.

2016–present: The constituency contains the polling districts of Taman Bunga Raya, Talang Hulu, Jalan Baharu, Bendang Panjang, Jerlun, Kampong Mesjid, Kampong Ketior, Ulu Kenas, Lempor, Kampong Jeliang, Manong, Kampong Semat, Ulu Piol.

=== Polling districts ===
According to the federal gazette issued on 31 October 2022, the Manong constituency is divided into 13 polling districts.

State constituency	Polling Districts	Code	Location
Manong (N35)	Taman Bunga Raya	067/35/01	SRA Rakyat Nurul Islamiah
Manong (N35)	Talang Hulu	067/35/02	SK Talang
Manong (N35)	Jalan Baharu	067/35/03	SMK Raja Muda Musa
Manong (N35)	Bendang Panjang	067/35/04	SRA Rakyat Ummul Khairiah
Manong (N35)	Jerlun	067/35/05	SJK (C) Jerlun
Manong (N35)	Kampong Mesjid	067/35/06	SK Sultan Abdul Aziz
Manong (N35)	Kampong Ketior	067/35/07	SK Sultan Abdul Aziz
Manong (N35)	Ulu Kenas	067/35/08	SK Ulu Kenas
Manong (N35)	Lempor	067/35/09	SK Lempor
Manong (N35)	Kampong Jeliang	067/35/10	SK Jeliang
Manong (N35)	Manong	067/35/11	SK Manong
Manong (N35)	Kampong Semat	067/35/12	Dewan Orang Ramai Kampong Semat
Manong (N35)	Ulu Piol	067/35/13	SK Ulu Piol

=== Representation history ===
Members of the Legislative Assembly for Manong
Assembly	No	Years	Member	Party
Constituency created from Senggang
4th	N18	1974-1978	Shafie Mohamed Saman	BN (UMNO)
5th	N18	1978-1982	Shafie Mohamed Saman	BN (UMNO)
6th	N18	1982-1986	Shafie Mohamed Saman	BN (UMNO)
Constituency abolished, spli into Batu Hampar and Bukit Chandan
Constituency re-created from Batu Hampar and Bukit Chandan
9th	N30	1995-1999	Ramly Zahari	BN (UMNO)
10th	N30	1999-2004	Ramly Zahari	BN (UMNO)
11th	N35	2004-2008	Ramly Zahari	BN (UMNO)
12th	N35	2008-2013	Ramly Zahari	BN (UMNO)
13th	N35	2013-2018	Mohamad Kamil Shafie	BN (UMNO)
14th	N35	2018–2022	Mohamad Zuraimi Razali	BN (UMNO)
15th	N35	2022–present	Burhanuddin Ahmad	PN (PAS)

== Election results ==
Perak state election, 2022
Party	Candidate	Votes	%	∆%
PN	Burhanudin Ahmad	8,220	44.04	▲44.04
BN	Mustafa Shah	5,308	28.44	▼10.81
PH	Mohd Jamsari Mahamood	5,137	27.52	▲27.52
Total valid votes		18,665	100.00	
Total rejected ballots		234		
Unreturned ballots		42		
Turnout		18,941	76.40	▼8.41
Registered electors		24,791		
Majority		2,912	15.60	▲12.02
PN gain from BN		Swing		?

Perak state election, 2018
Party	Candidate	Votes	%	∆%
BN	Mohamad Zuraimi Razali	6,267	39.25	▼11.54
PKR	Mohamad Isa Jaafar	5,696	35.67	▲35.67
PAS	Jamil Dzulkarnain	4,004	25.08	▼23.35
Total valid votes		15,967	95.84	
Total rejected ballots		207	1.24	
Unreturned ballots		486	2.92	
Turnout		16,660	84.81	▲0.49
Registered electors		19,643		
Majority		571	3.58	▲1.22
BN hold		Swing		
Source(s) "RESULTS OF CONTESTED ELECTION AND STATEMENTS OF THE POLL AFTER THE OFFICIAL ADDITION OF VOTES".

Perak state election, 2013
Party	Candidate	Votes	%	∆%
BN	Mohamad Kamil Shafie	7,405	50.79	▼2.94
PAS	Jamil Dzulkarnain	7,174	48.43	▲2.94
Total valid votes		14,579	98.43	
Total rejected ballots		187	1.26	
Unreturned ballots		46	0.31	
Turnout		14,812	84.35	▲11.68
Registered electors		17,561		
Majority		231	2.36	▼5.10
BN hold		Swing		
Source(s) "Federal Government Gazette - Notice of Contested Election, State Legislative Assembly for the State of Perak [P.U. (B) 190/2013]" (PDF). Attorney General's Chambers of Malaysia. 26 April 2013. "Federal Government Gazette - Results of Contested Election and Statements of the Poll after the Official Addition of Votes, State Constituencies for the State of Perak [P.U. (B) 231/2013]" (PDF). Attorney General's Chambers of Malaysia. 22 May 2013.

Perak state election, 2008
Party	Candidate	Votes	%	∆%
BN	Ramly Zahari	5,391	53.73	▼12.08
PAS	Mohamad Yazid Yeop Baharudin	4,642	46.27	▲12.08
Total valid votes		10,033	97.83	
Total rejected ballots		160	1.56	
Unreturned ballots		63	0.61	
Turnout		10,256	72.67	▲1.70
Registered electors		14,114		
Majority		749	7.46	▼24.16
BN hold		Swing		
Source(s) "KEPUTUSAN PILIHAN RAYA UMUM DEWAN UNDANGAN NEGERI PERAK BAGI TAHUN 2008".

Perak state election, 2004
Party	Candidate	Votes	%	∆%
BN	Ramly Zahari	6,374	65.81	▲10.42
PAS	Asmuni Awi	3,312	34.19	▼10.42
Total valid votes		9,686	97.91	
Total rejected ballots		181	1.83	
Unreturned ballots		26	0.26	
Turnout		9,893	70.97	▲3.72
Registered electors		13,939		
Majority		3,062	31.62	▲20.84
BN hold		Swing		
Source(s) "KEPUTUSAN PILIHAN RAYA UMUM DEWAN UNDANGAN NEGERI PERAK BAGI TAHUN 2004".

Perak state election, 1999
Party	Candidate	Votes	%	∆%
BN	Ramly Zahari	5,977	55.39	▼22.64
PAS	Raja Ahmad Kamar Raja Adenan	4,814	44.61	▲22.64
Total valid votes		10,791	94.85	
Total rejected ballots		256	2.25	
Unreturned ballots		330	2.90	
Turnout		11,377	67.25	▲0.44
Registered electors		16,917		
Majority		1,163	10.78	▼45.28
BN hold		Swing		
Source(s) "KEPUTUSAN PILIHAN RAYA UMUM DEWAN UNDANGAN NEGERI PERAK BAGI TAHUN 1999".

Perak state election, 1995
Party	Candidate	Votes	%	∆%
BN	Ramly Zahari	7,767	78.03	▲13.59
PAS	Muhammad Harun @ Mohd Nor Harun	2,187	21.97	▼13.59
Total valid votes		9,954	96.64	
Total rejected ballots		301	2.92	
Unreturned ballots		45	0.44	
Turnout		10,300	66.81	▼8.49
Registered electors		15,416		
Majority		5,580	56.06	▲27.18
BN hold		Swing		
Source(s) "KEPUTUSAN PILIHAN RAYA UMUM DEWAN UNDANGAN NEGERI PERAK BAGI TAHUN 1995".

Perak state election, 1982
Party	Candidate	Votes	%	∆%
BN	Shafie Mohamed Saman	4,064	64.44	▲12.40
PAS	Zaidin Alang Osman	2,243	35.56	▼0.23
Total valid votes		6,307	96.97	
Total rejected ballots		197	3.03	
Unreturned ballots		0	0.00	
Turnout		6,504	75.30	▼2.87
Registered electors		8,637		
Majority		1,821	28.88	▲12.63
BN hold		Swing		

Perak state election, 1978
Party	Candidate	Votes	%	∆%
BN	Shafie Mohamed Saman	2,965	52.04	▼20.40
PAS	Zaidin Alang Osman	2,039	35.79	▲35.79
DAP	Fathil Khalib	693	12.16	▼1.42
Total valid votes		5,697	100.00	
Total rejected ballots		228		
Unreturned ballots		0		
Turnout		5,925	78.18	▲7.63
Registered electors		7,579		
Majority		926	16.25	▼42.21
BN hold		Swing		

Perak state election, 1974
Party	Candidate	Votes	%
BN	Shafie Mohamed Saman	3,425	72.44
PEKEMAS	Fathil Khalib	661	13.98
DAP	Syed Othman Jamalullail	642	13.58
Total valid votes		4,728	100.00
Total rejected ballots		317	
Unreturned ballots		0	
Turnout		5,045	70.55
Registered electors		7,151	
Majority		2,764	58.46
This was a new constituency created.
