= Zainun Mat Noor =

Malaysian politician

Yang Berbahagia Dato' Zainun Mat Noor DPMP AMP PPT KMN
- زينون مت نور

Member of the Perak State Legislative Assembly for Chenderoh
- In office 2013 – 19 November 2022
- Preceded by: Siti Salmah Mat Jusak

Personal details
- Born: Zainun bin Mat Noor
- Citizenship: Malaysian
- Party: UMNO
- Other political affiliations: Barisan Nasional
- Occupation: Politician

Zainun bin Mat Noor is a Malaysian politician from UMNO. He has been the Member of Perak State Legislative Assembly for Chenderoh from 2013 to November 2022.

== Politics ==
He is the Deputy Chairman of UMNO Padang Rengas branch.

== Election results ==
Perak State Legislative Assembly
Year	Constituency	Candidate	Votes	Pct	Opponent(s)	Votes	Pct	Ballots cast	Majority	Turnout
2013	N19 Chenderoh	Zainun Mat Noor (UMNO)	6,457	55.86%	Mohamad Azalan Mohamad Radzi (PAS)	4,890	42.30%	11,559	1,567	84.90%
2018	N19 Chenderoh	Zainun Mat Noor (UMNO)	5,546	46.74%	Khairul Anuar Musa (PKR)	3,176	26.77%	11,865	2,370	82.28%
2018	N19 Chenderoh	Zainun Mat Noor (UMNO)	5,546	46.74%	Mohammad Farid Faizi Azizan (PAS)	2,944	24.81%	11,865	2,370	82.28%

== Honours ==
- Malaysia
  - Officer of the Order of the Defender of the Realm (KMN) (2009)
- Perak
  - Knight Commander of the Order of the Perak State Crown (DPMP) – Dato' (2015)
  - Member of the Order of the Perak State Crown (AMP) (2008)
  - Recipient of the Distinguished Conduct Medal (PPT) (1999)
