= Nga Kor Ming =

Malaysian politician and lawyer

Yang Berhormat Tuan Nga Kor Ming MP MLA
- 倪可敏
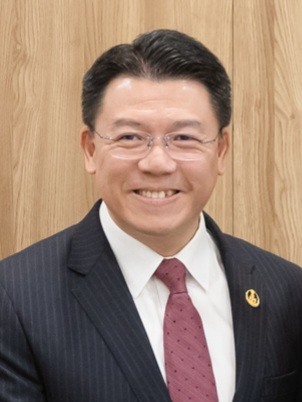
- Nga in 2023

Minister of Housing and Local Government
- Incumbent
- Assumed office 13 December 2023
- Monarchs: Abdullah (2022–2024); Ibrahim (since 2024)
- Prime Minister: Anwar Ibrahim
- Deputy: Aiman Athirah Sabu
- Preceded by: Position established
- Constituency: Teluk Intan

Minister of Local Government Development
- In office 3 December 2022 – 13 December 2023
- Monarch: Abdullah
- Prime Minister: Anwar Ibrahim
- Deputy: Akmal Nasrullah Mohd Nasir (2022–2023); Aiman Athirah Sabu (12–13 December 2023)
- Preceded by: Reezal Merican Naina Merican (Minister of Housing and Local Government)
- Succeeded by: Himself (Minister of Housing and Local Government)
- Constituency: Teluk Intan

Deputy Speaker of the Dewan Rakyat II
- In office 16 July 2018 – 13 July 2020 Serving with Mohd Rashid Hasnon
- Monarchs: Muhammad V (2018–2019); Abdullah (2019–2020)
- Prime Minister: Mahathir Mohamad (2018–2020); Muhyiddin Yassin (2020)
- Speaker: Mohamad Ariff Md Yusof
- Preceded by: Ismail Mohamed Said
- Succeeded by: Azalina Othman Said
- Constituency: Teluk Intan

Member of the Perak State Executive Council
- In office 28 March 2008 – 10 February 2009
- Monarch: Azlan Shah
- Menteri Besar: Mohammad Nizar Jamaluddin
- Portfolio: Education, Local Government, Housing & Public Transport
- Preceded by: Zambry Abdul Kadir (Education); Chang Ko Youn (Local Government, Housing and Public Transport)
- Succeeded by: Mohamad Zahir Abdul Khalid (Education); Mah Hang Soon (Local Government and Public Transport); Zambry Abdul Kadir (Housing)
- Constituency: Pantai Remis

Member of the Malaysian Parliament for Teluk Intan
- Incumbent
- Assumed office 9 May 2018
- Preceded by: Mah Siew Keong (BN–GERAKAN)
- Majority: 11,179 (2018); 15,169 (2022)

Member of the Malaysian Parliament for Taiping
- In office 8 March 2008 – 9 May 2018
- Preceded by: M. Kayveas (BN–PPP)
- Succeeded by: Teh Kok Lim (PH–DAP)
- Majority: 11,298 (2008); 11,745 (2013)

Member of the Perak State Legislative Assembly for Kepayang
- Incumbent
- Assumed office 19 November 2022
- Preceded by: Ko Chung Sen (PH–DAP)
- Majority: 9,491 (2022)
- In office 5 May 2013 – 9 May 2018
- Preceded by: Loke Chee Yan (PR–DAP)
- Succeeded by: Ko Chung Sen (PH–DAP)
- Majority: 4,604 (2013)

Member of the Perak State Legislative Assembly for Aulong
- In office 9 May 2018 – 19 November 2022
- Preceded by: Leow Thye Yih (PH–DAP)
- Succeeded by: Teh Kok Lim (PH–DAP)
- Majority: 12,064 (2018)

Member of the Perak State Legislative Assembly for Pantai Remis
- In office 29 November 1999 – 5 May 2013
- Preceded by: Wong Chong Sang (BN–MCA)
- Succeeded by: Wong May Ing (PR–DAP)
- Majority: 2,447 (1999); 2,303 (2004); 5,706 (2008)

National Deputy Chairman of the Democratic Action Party
- Incumbent
- Assumed office 16 March 2025
- National Chairman: Gobind Singh Deo
- Secretary-General: Anthony Loke Siew Fook
- Preceded by: Gobind Singh Deo

National Vice Chairman of the Democratic Action Party
- In office 20 March 2022 – 16 March 2025 Serving with: Chow Kon Yeow &; Chong Chieng Jen &; Teresa Kok Suh Sim &; M. Kulasegaran
- National Chairman: Lim Guan Eng
- Secretary-General: Anthony Loke Siew Fook

3rd Parliamentary Leader of the Democratic Action Party
- In office 20 March 2022 – 16 March 2025
- National Chairman: Lim Guan Eng
- Secretary-General: Anthony Loke Siew Fook
- Preceded by: Anthony Loke Siew Fook
- Succeeded by: Chong Chieng Jen

Deputy Secretary-General of the Democratic Action Party
- In office 12 November 2017 – 20 March 2022 Serving with: Teresa Kok Suh Sim &; Sivakumar Varatharaju
- National Chairman: Tan Kok Wai
- Secretary-General: Lim Guan Eng
- Preceded by: Ngeh Koo Ham
- Succeeded by: Liew Chin Tong

Personal details
- Born: Nga Kor Ming; 11 November 1972 (age 53) Kota Bharu, Kelantan, Malaysia
- Party: Democratic Action Party (DAP) (since 1999)
- Other political affiliations: Barisan Alternatif (BA) (1999–2004); Pakatan Rakyat (PR) (2008–2015); Pakatan Harapan (PH) (since 2015)
- Spouse: Wong Seow Ching
- Relations: Ngeh Koo Ham (cousin)
- Children: 3
- Education: University of Malaya (LLB)
- Occupation: Politician
- Profession: Lawyer
- Website: Official website
- Nga Kor Ming on Facebook; Nga Kor Ming on Parliament of Malaysia

Nga Kor Ming
- Chinese: 倪可敏
Transcriptions
Standard Mandarin
- Hanyu Pinyin: Ní Kěmǐn
Southern Min
- Hokkien POJ: Gê Khó-bín
Eastern Min
- Fuzhou BUC: Ngà̤ Kō̤-mīng

Nga Kor Ming (Chinese: 倪可敏; born 11 November 1972), also known as David Nga Kor Ming, is a Malaysian politician and lawyer who has served as the Minister of Housing and Local Government in the unity government of Prime Minister Anwar Ibrahim since December 2022. He has also been the Member of Parliament (MP) for Teluk Intan since May 2018, and Member of the Perak State Legislative Assembly (MLA) for Kepayang since November 2022. A member of the Democratic Action Party (DAP), a component party of the Pakatan Harapan (PH) coalition, he has been the party's National Deputy Chairman since March 2025.

He was the Deputy Speaker of the Dewan Rakyat from July 2018 to July 2020, and was a member of the Perak State Executive Council (EXCO) of the Pakatan Rakyat (PR) state administration under former Menteri Besar Mohammad Nizar Jamaluddin from March 2008 to February 2009. He also served as the MP for Taiping from March 2008 to May 2018, and was the MLA for Pantai Remis from November 1999 to March 2013, Kepayang from May 2013 to May 2018, and Aulong from May 2018 to November 2022.

== Personal life ==
Nga was born in Kota Bharu, Kelantan, Malaysia, His family origin was of Fuzhou origin (his mother was from Kelantan) and stayed at Ayer Tawar when they came to Malaya. He and his family are Methodists and he was christened to David by the late Rev. Koh Gie Bing. His wife is also from Ayer Tawar and they have three children.

== Education and professional career ==
Nga received a Bachelor of Laws from University of Malaya. Before his appointment to the Perak executive council, he practised as a lawyer in Ayer Tawar and also in Ipoh, Perak.

In 2007, he was recognised as one of Ten Outstanding Young Malaysians by the International Junior Chamber of Commerce and the Ministry of Youth and Sports in the category of 'Politics and Government'. This award was notable as it rarely goes to opposition politicians.

== Political career ==
Nga made his election debut and had been Perak State Assemblyman for Pantai Remis for three terms since the 1999, 2004 and 2008 General Elections. He became Member of Parliament for Taiping, Perak after defeating President of the People's Progressive Party (PPP), M. Kayveas with a majority of 11,298 votes in the 2008 General Election too on 8 March 2008. In 2008, with the formation of the Perak government by the coalition of DAP, PKR and PAS collectively known as Pakatan Rakyat (PR), Nga was appointed to the state executive committee, with the portfolios of Education, Local Government, Housing and Public Transport. Perak had previously been ruled continuously by the Barisan Nasional (BN) (or its predecessor the Alliance Party) since the independence of Malaya (later Malaysia) in 1957. In the 2013 General Election, he was reelected in the Taiping parliamentary seat and won the Perak state seat of Kepayang too. In the 2018 General Election, he won the Parliament for the seat of Teluk Intan by defeating the incumbent, Mah Siew Keong of BN and the Perak state seat of Aulong concurrently.

== Controversies and issues ==
=== Racial remarks ===
In 2011, Nga used the term "metallic black" to describe Menteri Besar of Perak Zambry Abdul Kadir, during political rallies in Kamunting. Nga Kor Ming apologised for his anti-Indian racist remarks for calling Zambry a "metallic black person". It was obvious that he was referring to Dr Zambry's skin colour of the Indians when he uttered the phrase in various speeches as seen in YouTube, which he subsequently denied.

The apology was accepted by DAP National Chairman Karpal Singh, however, it is believed that no action was taken although DAP was known as a multi-racial party and its leaders were not known to pass racist remarks against any community or race until the racial slur by Nga.

=== Tailorgate ===
In 2012, Nga sued blogger sekupangdua, whose true identity is Ahmad Sofian Yahya at Ipoh High Court for exemplary damages, aggravated damages and an order of injunction against further publication of defamatory words.

It has been revealed that his wife's company was previously awarded the contract to make lounge suits for the councillors of Ipoh City Council (MBI) when Pakatan Rakyat (PR) was ruling Perak.

DAP Perak stresses that MBI's award of tailoring contract was done by the council's tender board by way of open tender, it is claimed that Nga did not interfere in the committee overlooking the open tender process. The subject matter is a contract for 24 lounge suit for MBI councillors at the price of RM650 each and a total price of RM14,400.00.

Nga's wife's company, which submitted a bid for RM650 per suit, predictably ended up being awarded the job sometime in 2008. The open tender involved 4 other tailor companies and Nga's wife's company Ethan and Elton was awarded the contract despite being the most expensive at RM650, the lowest bidder Goodman Tailor having tendered for RM450.

The DAP disciplinary committee cleared Nga of any power abuse in the awarding of a lounge suit contract to his wife's company.

=== Speech controversy ===
In May 2018, Nga's action of ridiculing Mahathir Mohamad by touching on the issue of his mortality, has been deemed rude, uncouth, extreme and disgusting, and runs contrary to the customs and norms of the people of Malaysia.

=== School building named after him ===
In 2019, the naming of a new three-storey building of SJK (C) Sin Min, a Malaysian Chinese primary school in Simpang, Perak, after Nga has raised a controversy. The 3D Chinese characters for "Nga Kor Ming Building" affixed on the new block to honour Nga for helping to secure a RM220,000 government grant for the school, was questioned and condemned by certain quarters. Nga dismissed criticism over the polemic and pointed out it was the school board's decision to pick his name and he did not make a request nor give instruction for the school to do so.

=== Malaysian labour in Singapore remarks ===
On 27 October 2022, during a Johor campaign trail ahead of the following month's general election, Nga sparked controversy by claiming that Malaysians would continue to be forced to commute early to Singapore for work and return late at night if BN won the election. He further asserted that if PH won, Singaporeans would flock to Malaysia as foreign labourers instead of the other way around. Following widespread mockery, Nga clarified that he had no intention of offending anyone. He claimed the opposition had taken his remarks out of context, explaining that he simply meant Malaysia should maintain a mutually beneficial relationship with Singapore.

=== MyKiosk "white elephant" project allegation ===
The MyKiosk programme became the subject of public controversy over allegations of inflated procurement costs and poor utilisation of completed kiosks. Critics described the RM150 million initiative as a "white elephant" project and questioned the government's reported construction costs, noting that MyKiosk 1.0 units cost approximately RM15,000 each, while MyKiosk 2.0 units had a procurement ceiling of RM25,000 to RM34,000, compared with a market estimate of around RM12,800 for similar kiosks.

Opposition politicians and other critics also disputed the ministry's reported occupancy figures, citing data from several local authorities which they claimed showed that only slightly more than half of the completed kiosks were occupied, with many remaining vacant, locked, or abandoned. In response, Nga rejected the allegations, stating that MyKiosk 1.0 had achieved an occupancy rate of 91.75% and defended the programme against claims of widespread underutilisation.

=== BN "poster boy" in 2026 Johor state election ===
During the July 2026 Johor state election, Nga faced heavy internal and external criticism for several controversial statements made during the campaign trail, which political analysts and party peers cited as a key factor in Pakatan Harapan's heavy defeats.

Nga initially pledged that he would resign from his party post if the Barisan Nasional coalition won more than 40 seats in Johor. Following BN's landslide 48-seat victory, Nga faced widespread calls to step down, but he later clarified that his resignation offer was conditionally tied to the potential legal release of former Prime Minister Najib Razak, rather than election seat thresholds.

Further controversy arose when Nga publicly declared that if PH won the state election, his ministry would replace all 123 Chinese new village chiefs (Ketua Kampung Baru) in Johor with DAP appointees. PKR Central Committee member Elizabeth Wong stated that Nga's threats against the village chiefs alienated crucial rural Chinese voters and dismantled decades of grassroots goodwill.

Political commentators noted that Nga's combative rhetoric and highly publicized campaign missteps inadvertently acted as a mobilizing factor for conservative voters against the PH coalition, rendering him BN's unofficial "poster boy" during the election cycle.

== Election results ==
Perak State Legislative Assembly
Year	Constituency	Candidate	Votes	Pct	Opponent(s)	Votes	Pct	Ballots cast	Majority	Turnout
1999	N32 Pantai Remis	Nga Kor Ming (DAP)	9,896	55.86%	Wong Chong Sang (MCA)	7,449	42.05%	17,716	2,447	64.09%
2004	N37 Pantai Remis	Nga Kor Ming (DAP)	9,703	55.02%	Wong Chong Sang (MCA)	7,400	41.96%	17,635	2,303	66.18%
2008	N37 Pantai Remis	Nga Kor Ming (DAP)	12,188	61.83%	Ooi Jing Ting (MCA)	7,112	36.08%	19,712	5.076	70.37%
2013	N29 Kepayang	Nga Kor Ming (DAP)	10,948	62.32%	Chang Kok Aun (MCA)	6.344	36,12%	17,566	4,604	79.50%
2018	N18 Aulong	Nga Kor Ming (DAP)	18,123	56.40%	Soo Kay Ping (Gerakan)	6,059	18.90%	24,182	12,064	75.24%
2022	N29 Kepayang	Nga Kor Ming (DAP)	11,977	72.60%	Richard Ng (Gerakan)	2,486	15.67%	16,498	9,491	65.49%
2022	N29 Kepayang	Nga Kor Ming (DAP)	11,977	72.60%	Lim Huey Shan (MCA)	2,035	12.33%	16,498	9,491	65.49%

Parliament of Malaysia
Year	Constituency	Candidate	Votes	Pct	Opponent(s)	Votes	Pct	Ballots cast	Majority	Turnout
2008	P060 Taiping	Nga Kor Ming (DAP)	28,098	59.63%	M. Kayveas (PPP)	16,800	35.65%	47,123	11,298	71.52%
2013	P060 Taiping	Nga Kor Ming (DAP)	37,275	58.32%	Tan Lian Hoe (Gerakan)	25,530	39.94%	63,913	11,745	81.80%
2018	P076 Teluk Intan	Nga Kor Ming (DAP)	29,170	54.57%	Mah Siew Keong (Gerakan)	17,991	34.13%	54,601	11,179	82.10%
2018	P076 Teluk Intan	Nga Kor Ming (DAP)	29,170	54.57%	Ahmad Ramadzan Ahmad Daud (PAS)	6,494	12.10%	54,601	11,179	82.10%
2022	P076 Teluk Intan	Nga Kor Ming (DAP)	33,133	51.61%	Zainol Fadzi Paharudin (BERSATU)	17,964	27.98%	64,194	15,169	80.60%
2022	P076 Teluk Intan	Nga Kor Ming (DAP)	33,133	51.61%	Murugiah Thopasamy (MIC)	12,304	19.17%	64,194	15,169	80.60%
2022	P076 Teluk Intan	Nga Kor Ming (DAP)	33,133	51.61%	Ahmad Khusyairi Mohamad Tanusi (PEJUANG)	793	1.24%	64,194	15,169	80.60%

== Honours ==
=== Honours of Malaysia ===
- Malaysia
  - Recipient of the 17th Yang di-Pertuan Agong Installation Medal (2025)
