= Teh Kok Lim =

Malaysian politician (born 1970)

Yang Berhormat Tuan Teh Kok Lim MLA
- 郑国霖

Member of the Perak State Executive Council
- Incumbent
- Assumed office 22 November 2022
- Monarch: Nazrin Shah
- Menteri Besar: Saarani Mohamad
- Portfolio: Science, Environment & Green Technology (Note: Assumed portfolios 23 November 2022 taking office.)
- Preceded by: Mohd Akmal Kamaruddin
- Constituency: Aulong

Member of the Perak State Legislative Assembly for Aulong
- Incumbent
- Assumed office 19 November 2022
- Preceded by: Nga Kor Ming (PH–DAP)
- Majority: 14,857 (2022)

Member of the Malaysian Parliament for Taiping
- In office 9 May 2018 – 19 November 2022
- Preceded by: Nga Kor Ming (PH–DAP)
- Succeeded by: Wong Kah Woh (PH–DAP)
- Majority: 27,384 (2018)

Member of the Perak State Legislative Assembly for Pokok Assam
- In office 5 May 2013 – 9 May 2018
- Preceded by: Yee Seu Kai (PR–DAP)
- Succeeded by: Leow Thye Yih (PH–DAP)
- Majority: 7,925 (2013)

Faction represented in Perak State Legislative Assembly
- 2013–2018: Democratic Action Party
- 2022–: Pakatan Harapan

Faction represented in Dewan Rakyat
- 2018–2022: Pakatan Harapan

Personal details
- Born: Teh Kok Lim; 18 March 1970 (age 56) Taiping, Perak, Malaysia.
- Citizenship: Malaysian
- Party: Democratic Action Party (DAP)
- Other political affiliations: Pakatan Rakyat (PR) (2008–2015); Pakatan Harapan (PH) (since 2015)
- Occupation: Politician
- Website: Teh Kok Lim on Facebook

Teh Kok Lim (Chinese: 郑国霖; pinyin: Zhèng Guólín; Jyutping: Zeng6 Gwok3 Lam4; Pe̍h-ōe-jī: Tēⁿ Kok-lîm; born 18 March 1970) is a Malaysian politician who has served as Member of the Perak State Executive Council (EXCO) in the Barisan Nasional (BN) state administration under Menteri Besar Saarani Mohamad and Member of the Perak State Legislative Assembly (MLA) for Aulong since November 2022. He served as the Member of Parliament (MP) for Taiping from May 2018 to November 2022 and the MLA for Pokok Assam from May 2013 to May 2018. He is a member of the Democratic Action Party (DAP), a component party of the Pakatan Harapan (PH) coalition.

In the 2018 general election, Teh was elected to the Parliament of Malaysia for the Taiping constituency, winning 42,997 of the 69,743 votes cast. In the 2022 Perak state election, he was elected to the Perak State Legislative Assembly for the Aulong seat, winning 20,306 of the 30,665 votes cast. On 22 November 2022, he was also appointed a Perak EXCO member.

== Election results ==
Perak State Legislative Assembly
Year	Constituency	Candidate	Votes	Pct	Opponent(s)	Votes	Pct	Ballots cast	Majority	Turnout
2013	N17 Pokok Assam	Teh Kok Lim (DAP)	12,780	71.1%	Ho Cheng Wang (MCA)	4,855	27.0%	17,986	7,925	80.4%
2013	N17 Pokok Assam	Teh Kok Lim (DAP)	12,780	71.1%	Mohd Yusoff Abdull Hamid (IND)	192	1.1%	17,986	7,925	80.4%
2022	N18 Aulong	Teh Kok Lim (DAP)	20,306	66.22%	Koay Boon Hui (Gerakan)	5,449	17.77%	30,665	14,857	67.84%
2022	N18 Aulong	Teh Kok Lim (DAP)	20,306	66.22%	G Shanmugiavalloo (MIC)	3,756	12.25%	30,665	14,857	67.84%
2022	N18 Aulong	Teh Kok Lim (DAP)	20,306	66.22%	Lee Seng Yap (IND)	739	2.41%	30,665	14,857	67.84%
2022	N18 Aulong	Teh Kok Lim (DAP)	20,306	66.22%	Abu Bakar Abdul Rahman (IND)	415	1.35%	30,665	14,857	67.84%

Parliament of Malaysia
Year	Constituency	Candidate	Votes	Pct	Opponent(s)	Votes	Pct	Ballots cast	Majority	Turnout
2018	P060 Taiping	Teh Kok Lim (DAP)	42,997	61.65%	Tan Keng Liang (Gerakan)	15,613	22.39%	71,297	27,384	78.58%
2018	P060 Taiping	Teh Kok Lim (DAP)	42,997	61.65%	Ibrahim Ismail (PAS)	11,133	15.96%	71,297	27,384	78.58%
