= Teoh Yee Chern =

Malaysian politician

- 张宇晨

Member of the Perak State Legislative Assembly for Astaka
- In office 9 May 2018 – 19 November 2022
- Preceded by: Position established
- Succeeded by: Jason Ng Thien Yeong (PH–DAP)
- Majority: 15,176 (2018)

Personal details
- Born: Teoh Yee Chern; 1990 (age 35–36)
- Citizenship: Malaysian
- Party: Democratic Action Party (DAP)
- Other political affiliations: Pakatan Harapan (PH)
- Education: Aberystwyth University; Brickfields Asia College
- Occupation: Politician
- Profession: Lawyer

Teoh Yee Chern

Chinese name
- Traditional Chinese: 張宇晨
- Simplified Chinese: 张宇晨
- Hanyu Pinyin: Zhāng Yǔchén
- Jyutping: Zoeng1 Jyu5 San4
- Hokkien POJ: Tiuⁿ Ú-sîn
- Tâi-lô: Tiunn Ú-sîn

Teoh Yee Chern (simplified Chinese: 张宇晨; traditional Chinese: 張宇晨; pinyin: Zhāng Yǔchén; born 1990) is a Malaysian politician who served as Member of the Perak State Legislative Assembly (MLA) for Astaka from May 2018 to November 2022. He is a member, State Youth Publicity Secretary of Perak and the Division Youth Chief of Lumut of the Democratic Action Party (DAP), a component party of the Pakatan Harapan (PH) coalition.

== Election results ==
Perak State Legislative Assembly
Year	Constituency	Candidate	Votes	Pct.	Opponent(s)	Votes	Pct.	Ballots cast	Majority	Turnout
2018	N38 Astaka	Teoh Yee Chern (DAP)	18,814	82.35%	Teng Keek Soong (MCA)	3,638	15.92%	22,847	15,176	77.88%
