= Mohamad Zuraimi Razali =

Malaysian politician

Mohamad Zuraimi Razali PPT PJK
- محمد ذورايمي غزالي

Member of the Perak State Legislative Assembly for Manong
- In office 9 May 2018 – 19 November 2022
- Preceded by: Mohamad Kamil Shafie (BN–UMNO)
- Succeeded by: Berhanudin Ahmad (PN–PAS)
- Majority: 571 (2018)

Personal details
- Born: Mohamad Zuraimi bin Razali; 29 May 1972 (age 54)
- Citizenship: Malaysian
- Party: UMNO
- Other political affiliations: Barisan Nasional
- Education: SMK Sultan Tajul Ariffin
- Occupation: Politician

Mohamad Zuraimi bin Razali is a Malaysian politician. He has been the Member of Perak State Legislative Assembly (MLA) for Manong from 2018 to November 2022.

== Politics ==
He is the Deputy Chief of UMNO Kuala Kangsar Branch.

== Election results ==
Perak State Legislative Assembly
Year	Constituency	Candidate	Votes	Pct	Opponent(s)	Votes	Pct	Ballots cast	Majority	Turnout
2018	N35 Manong	Mohamad Zuraimi Razali (UMNO)	6,267	39.25%	Mohamad Isa Jaafar (AMANAH)	5,696	35.67%	16,660	571	84.81%
2018	N35 Manong	Mohamad Zuraimi Razali (UMNO)	6,267	39.25%	Jamil Dzulkarnain (PAS)	4,004	25.08%	16,660	571	84.81%

== Honours ==
- Perak
  - Recipient of the Distinguished Conduct Medal (PPT) (2012)
  - Recipient of the Meritorious Service Medal (PJK) (2007)
