= Rusnah Kassim =

Malaysian politician

Yang Berbahagia Dato' Rusnah Kassim DPCM DPMP

Member of the Perak State Executive Council
- In office 2014 – 12 May 2018
- Monarch: Nazrin Shah
- Portfolio: Women's Development, Family and Community Welfare, Housing and Local Government
- Preceded by: Herself (Women and Family Development, Community Welfare); Saarani Mohamad (Housing and Local Government)
- Succeeded by: Wong May Ing (Women and Family Development, Community Welfare); Paul Yong Choo Kiong (Housing and Local Government)
- Constituency: Behrang
- In office 19 May 2013 – 2014
- Monarch: Nazrin Shah
- Menteri Besar: Zambry Abdul Kadir
- Portfolio: Women, Family, Social Welfare and National Integration
- Preceded by: Hamidah Osman (Women); Portfolio established (Family); Saarani Mohamad (Welfare); Portfolio established (National Integration)
- Succeeded by: Herself (Women and Family Development, Community Welfare); Mah Hang Soon (National Integration)
- Constituency: Behrang

Member of the Perak State Legislative Assembly for Behrang
- In office 5 May 2013 – 9 May 2018
- Preceded by: Jamaluddin Mohd Radzi (IND)
- Succeeded by: Aminuddin Zulkipli (PH–AMANAH)
- Majority: 1,968 (2013)

Member of the Perak State Legislative Assembly for Hulu Kinta
- In office 8 March 2008 – 5 May 2013
- Preceded by: Mazidah Zakaria (BN–UMNO)
- Succeeded by: Aminuddin Md Hanafiah (BN–UMNO)
- Majority: 5,232 (2008)

Personal details
- Party: United Malays National Organisation (UMNO)
- Other political affiliations: Barisan Nasional (BN)
- Occupation: Politician

Rusnah binti Kassim is a Malaysian polititcian who served as Member of the Perak State Executive Council (EXCO) in the Barisan Nasional (BN) administration under Menteri Besar Zambry Abdul Kadir from May 2013 to May 2018 as well as Member of the Perak State Legislative Assembly (MLA) for Behrang from May 2013 to May 2018, Hulu Kinta from March 2008 to May 2013. She is a member of United Malays National Organisation (UMNO), component party of Barisan Nasional (BN) coalitions.

== Election results ==
Perak State Legislative Assembly
Year	Constituency	Candidate	Votes	Pct	Opponent(s)	Votes	Pct	Ballots cast	Majority	Turnout
2008	N24 Hulu Kinta	Rusnah Kassim (UMNO)	13,057	61.47%	Ayyathurai Achutharaman (PKR)	7,825	36.84%	22,122	5,232	75.43%
2008	N24 Hulu Kinta	Rusnah Kassim (UMNO)	13,057	61.47%	Sathiya Seelan Munisamy (IND)	360	1.69%	22,122	5,232	75.43%
2013	N59 Behrang	Rusnah Kassim (UMNO)	9,823	53.45%	Abdul Hadi Abdul Khatab (PKR)	7,855	42.74%	18,923	1,968	82.70%
2013	N59 Behrang	Rusnah Kassim (UMNO)	9,823	53.45%	Kamal Badri Zainudin (IND)	358	1.95%	18,923	1,968	82.70%
2013	N59 Behrang	Rusnah Kassim (UMNO)	9,823	53.45%	Ramnaidu Suridemudu (IND)	341	1.86%	18,923	1,968	82.70%
2018	N59 Behrang	Rusnah Kassim (UMNO)	9,361	41.67%	Aminuddin Zulkipli (AMANAH)	9,770	43.49%	22,938	409	82.00%
2018	N59 Behrang	Rusnah Kassim (UMNO)	9,361	41.67%	Sayed Zamzuri Sayed Nengah (PAS)	3,334	14.84%	22,938	409	82.00%

== Honours ==
- Perak
  - Knight Commander of the Order of Cura Si Manja Kini (DPCM) – Dato' (2017)
  - Knight Commander of the Order of the Perak State Crown (DPMP) – Dato' (2006)
