= Sivakumar Varatharaju =

Malaysian politician

Yang Berhormat Tuan Sivakumar Varatharaju MP
- వి. శివకుమార్
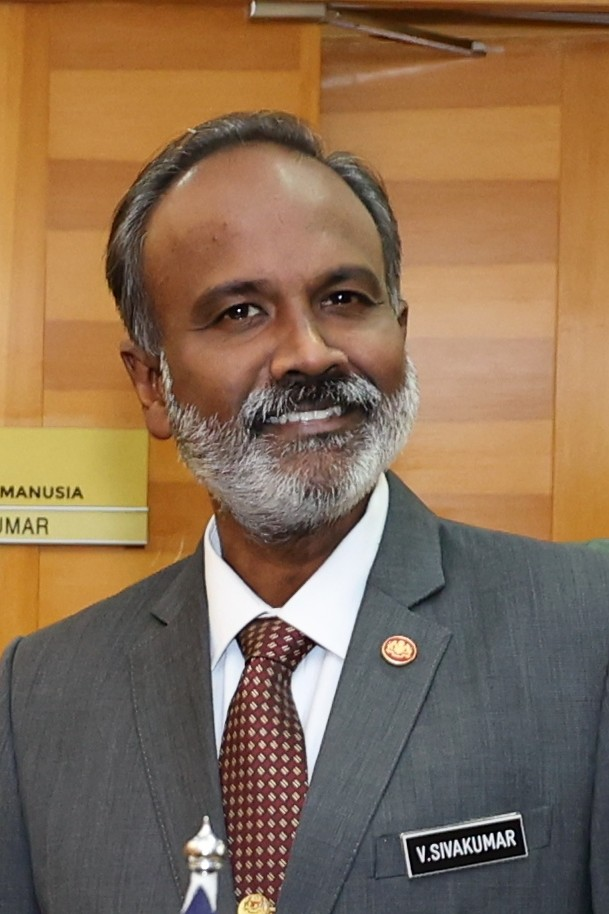

Minister of Human Resources
- In office 3 December 2022 – 12 December 2023
- Monarch: Abdullah
- Prime Minister: Anwar Ibrahim
- Deputy: Mustapha Sakmud
- Preceded by: Saravanan Murugan
- Succeeded by: Steven Sim Chee Keong
- Constituency: Batu Gajah

Deputy Secretary-General of the Democratic Action Party
- In office 12 November 2017 – 16 March 2025 Serving with Nga Kor Ming (2017–2022) & Teresa Kok Suh Sim (2017–2022) & Tengku Zulpuri Shah Raja Puji (2022–2025) & Liew Chin Tong (2022–2025)
- Secretary-General: Lim Guan Eng (2017–2022); Anthony Loke Siew Fook (2022–2025)
- National Chairman: Tan Kok Wai (2017–2022); Lim Guan Eng (2022–2025)

Speaker of the Perak State Legislative Assembly
- In office 25 April 2008 – 7 May 2009
- Monarch: Azlan Shah
- Menteri Besar: Mohammad Nizar Jamaluddin
- Preceded by: Junus Wahid
- Succeeded by: Ganesan Retanam
- Constituency: Tronoh

Member of the Malaysian Parliament for Batu Gajah
- Incumbent
- Assumed office 5 May 2013
- Preceded by: Fong Po Kuan (PR–DAP)
- Majority: 38,410 (2013); 43,868 (2018); 53,836 (2022)

Member of the Perak State Legislative Assembly for Tronoh
- In office 8 March 2008 – 5 May 2013
- Preceded by: Lee Kon Yin (BN–MCA)
- Succeeded by: Paul Yong Choo Kiong (PR–DAP)
- Majority: 2,571 (2008)

Personal details
- Born: Sivakumar s/o Varatharaju Naidu; 5 December 1970 (age 55) Perak, Malaysia
- Citizenship: Malaysian
- Party: Democratic Action Party (DAP)
- Other political affiliations: Pakatan Rakyat (PR) (2008–2015); Pakatan Harapan (PH) (since 2015)
- Spouse: S Easwari
- Parents: N. Varatharaju (father); S. Karunakari (mother)
- Education: University of Malaya
- Occupation: Politician
- Profession: Legal Philosopher; Businessman

Sivakumar s/o Varatharaju Naidu (Telugu: వి. శివకుమార్, romanized: vi. sivakumar; born 5 December 1970), better known as V. Sivakumar, is a Malaysian politician who has served as the Member of Parliament (MP) for Batu Gajah since May 2013. He served as the Minister of Human Resources in the Unity Government administration under Prime Minister Anwar Ibrahim from December 2022 to December 2023 and Member of the Perak State Legislative Assembly (MLA) for Tronoh from March 2008 to May 2013. He also served as Speaker of the assembly from April 2008 to May 2009. He is a member of the Democratic Action Party (DAP), a component party of the Pakatan Harapan (PH) and formerly Pakatan Rakyat (PR) coalitions. He has also served as the Deputy Secretary-General of DAP since November 2017. He was also the sole Cabinet minister of the Indian ethnicity prior to the 2023 cabinet reshuffle.

Prior to his political career, he obtained a Bachelor's degree in Economics from the University of Malaya and a professional qualification in insurance administration from the Life Office Management Association in the United States.

== Early life and entry into politics ==
Sivakumar was born in 1970 to M. Varatharaju and S. Karunakari in Perak, Malaysia. He received his Bachelor's degree in Economics with a specialization in Public Administration from the University of Malaya in 1994. In 2000, he obtained an Associate degree in Insurance Agency Administration from the Life Office Management Association in the United States.

Sivakumar entered politics in 1997, once serving as political secretary to Ipoh Barat MP M. Kulasegaran, before winning the Tronoh state seat in the 2008 general election, defeating Lee Kim Choy with a majority of 2,571. Sivakumar holds a Bachelor's in Legal Philosophy and a Master's in Business Administration. Sivakumar was nominated speaker by Pakatan Rakyat and while Barisan Nasional nominated Junus Wahid, the incumbent, to continue as speaker. A fired up debate ensued between the two sides, and Sivakumar was elected speaker through secret ballot on 25 April 2008 at 4.05pm with 31 votes, against Junus' 28 votes. Hee Yit Foong was appointed deputy speaker soon after.

In the 2013 general election, Sivakumar contested and won the parliamentary constituency of Batu Gajah in Perak.

== Political career ==
=== Speaker of the Perak State Legislative Assembly (2008–2009) ===
Sivakumar began his political career in 1997 when he joined the Democratic Action Party (DAP). In 2008, he ran for the Perak State Seat of Tronoh, under the Batu Gajah Parliamentary seat, and was elected as a first-time member of the Perak State Legislative Assembly, becoming the first Malaysian Indian to be appointed as Speaker of the Perak State Legislative Assembly.

He is the first ethnic Indian to become the speaker of a Malaysian legislature, succeeding Junus Wahid, the previous speaker of the State Assembly from United Malays National Organisation (UMNO) and Barisan Nasional (BN).

Sivakumar's tenure as speaker was shrouded in controversy surrounding his handling of the 2009 Perak constitutional crisis, where the opposition Barisan Nasional managed to obtain three defections from the elected government, enabling Barisan Nasional under Zambry Abdul Kadir to form the new government. Sivakumar had the members of the disputed new Barisan Nasional cabinet suspended for contempt of assembly. Many blogs, particularly Malaysia Today run by the influential royal Raja Petra Kamaruddin, and news portals in cyberspace praised him for his resilience in insisting for an official vote of no-confidence against the incumbent Pakatan Rakyat government of Mohammad Nizar Jamaluddin before taking charge. The mainstream media of Malaysia criticised him for being partisan and biased against Barisan Nasional.

==== 2009 Perak constitutional crisis ====
On 27 February 2009, Sivakumar called for an emergency sitting of the Assembly to be held on 3 March 2009 to vote on two motions, the first motion being the affirmation of Mohammad Nizar Jamaluddin's government as the legitimate one and the second motion being the approval to dissolve the assembly to pave way for fresh polls in the state. Defying Sivakumar's directive, the Perak legal advisor, Ahmad Kamal Mohd Shahid prevented the notification of the emergency sitting from being released because the meeting did not obtain the consent of the Monarch. Sivakumar's lawyer Augustine Anthony countered the legal advisor citing that as an adjourned sitting, the session is not dissolved or prorogued and therefore does not require the consent of the Sultan.

Sivakumar cited the legislature's Standing Orders 89 as giving him final say in any interpretation of the state assembly's Standing Orders. On 2 March 2009 the Perak state secretary's office issued a directive to lock the gates to the state assembly building ahead of the emergency sitting of the state assembly. The same day Sivakumar announced that he was suspending the assembly's secretary Abdullah Antong Sabri with immediate effect and that the emergency meeting of the assembly scheduled for 3 March would go ahead as planned. The suspension action was taken because of Abdullah's "failure to carry out his duties professionally", said Sivakumar.

=== 3 March emergency sitting ===
On 3 March 2009, amidst a strong police presence, Sivakumar attempted to convene the emergency session of the assembly, but Pakatan Rakyat assemblypersons were barred from entering the State Secretariat. Sivakumar, wearing his full speaker robes and a songkok declared a tree in the parking lot of the State Secretariat as the meeting place. The session was witnessed by curious onlookers defying police warnings to stay away a motion of confidence in Mohammad Nizar Jamaluddin's government, a motion to affirm the suspension of Zambry Abdul Kadir's Barisan Nasional state exco and a motion to dissolve the assembly for snap polls were passed unanimously, 27–0.

Barisan Nasional protested the legitimacy of the emergency session and none of their assembly members attended. Nizar despatched a letter to Sultan Azlan Shah to request an audience to discuss the dissolution of the assembly.

The tree used for shade during the session was then dubbed the "Democracy Tree" by Pakatan Rakyat and a memorial plaque was unveiled on 8 March 2009, the first anniversary of the election which swept Pakatan Rakyat to power in Perak. A webpage commemorating the tree was also created.

=== Batu Gajah MP (2013–present) ===
In 2013, Sivakumar was re-elected to the Parliament seat of Batu Gajah and has held the seat ever since.

=== Deputy Secretary-General of the Democratic Action Party (2017–present) ===
Sivakumar was appointed as Deputy Secretary-General of DAP on 12 November 2017 after the 16th National Congress and Central Executive Committee (CEC) election along with then Seputeh MP Teresa Kok and then Taiping MP Nga Kor Ming. On 20 March 2022, Sivakumar was reappointed to the position although losing in the 17th National Congress and leadership election by being co-opted into the CEC for his reappointment.

=== Minister of Human Resources ===
Sivakumar was appointed as the Minister of Human Resources by Anwar Ibrahim in 2022. He is the only ethnic Indian full minister in Anwar Ibrahim Cabinet.

== Personal life ==
Sivakumar is married to a teacher, S. Easwari, in Ipoh. The couple have three children together. He is a member of the board of directors of Yayasan Perak, Ipoh, and the Kuala Lumpur-based Rubber Export Promotion Council Malaysia.

== Election results ==
Perak State Legislative Assembly
Year	Constituency	Candidate	Votes	Pct	Opponent(s)	Votes	Pct	Ballots cast	Majority	Turnout
1999	N22 Taman Canning	Sivakumar Varatharaju (DAP)	8,462	43.13%	Hiew Yew Can (Gerakan)	11,158	56.87%	19,960	2,696	67.8%
2008	N33 Tronoh	Sivakumar Varatharaju (DAP)	9,302	58.02%	Lee Kim Choy (MCA)	6,731	41.98%	16,446	2,571	68.23%

Parliament of Malaysia
Year	Constituency	Candidate	Votes	Pct	Opponent(s)	Votes	Pct	Ballots cast	Majority	Turnout
2013	P066 Batu Gajah	Sivakumar Varatharaju (DAP)	53,770	76.52%	Loo Thin Tuck (MCA)	15,360	21.86%	70,270	38,410	80.20%
2018	P066 Batu Gajah	Sivakumar Varatharaju (DAP)	52,850	84.17%	Leong Chee Wai (MCA)	8,982	14.31%	62,787	43,868	77.13%
2018	P066 Batu Gajah	Sivakumar Varatharaju (DAP)	52,850	84.17%	Kunasekaran Krishnan (PSM)	955	1.52%	62,787	43,868	77.13%
2022	P066 Batu Gajah	Sivakumar Varatharaju (DAP)	60,999	81.38%	Woo Cheong Yuen (Gerakan)	7,163	9.56%	75,935	53,836	67.90%
2022	P066 Batu Gajah	Sivakumar Varatharaju (DAP)	60,999	81.38%	Teoh Chin Chong (MCA)	6,793	9.06%	75,935	53,836	67.90%

== Honours ==
=== Honours of Malaysia ===
- Malaysia
  - Recipient of the 17th Yang di-Pertuan Agong Installation Medal
