= 2020 Slim by-election =

2020 state by-election in Perak, Malaysia

- 29 August 2020

N58 Slim seat in the Perak State Legislative Assembly
	Majority party	Minority party	Third party
	BN	IND	IND
Candidate	Mohd Zaidi Aziz	Amir Khusyairi Mohd Tanusi	Santharasekaran Subramaniam
Party	UMNO	Independent	Independent
Alliance	BN-MN-PN	PEJUANG-PH
Popular vote	13,060	2,115	276
Percentage	84.53%	13.69%	1.78%
MLA before election
Mohd. Khusairi Abdul Talib (died)
Barisan Nasional (UMNO)
Elected MLA
Mohd Zaidi Aziz
Barisan Nasional (UMNO)

A by-election was held on 29 August 2020 for the seat of Slim in the Perak State Legislative Assembly. The seat fell vacant following the sudden death of the incumbent Member of the Legislative Assembly (MLA) from United Malays National Organisation (UMNO) of the Barisan Nasional (BN) coalition, Mohd. Khusairi Abdul Talib, 59, due to a heart attack on 15 July 2020. He had held the seat for four terms since 2004.

The Election Commission (EC) had set the nomination day on 15 August 2020, early voting on 25 August and polling day for 29 August with a 14-day campaign period.

The N58 Slim state constituency boundaries within the P77 Tanjong Malim parliamentary constituency in Perak.

== Background ==
Ethnic breakdown of Slim's electorate as of 2018
Source: Malaysiakini
1. Malay (75.0%)
2. Indian (13.0%)
3. Chinese (10.0%)
4. Other (2.00%)

The small town of Slim River in Perak has a population of 27,139 residents comprising Malays (74 per cent), Indians (12 per cent), Chinese (10 per cent), Orang Asli (1.4 per cent) and others. The corresponding Slim state constituency has 23,094 registered voters comprising 22,815 normal voters, 277 early voters as well as 2 absentee voters overseas. The by-election to be conducted under the special guidelines and standard operating procedures (SOPs) imposed by EC due to the New Normal as the country is still observing the recovery phase of Movement Control Order (MCO) for COVID-19 pandemic.

The by-election is unlikely to affect the Perak state political scene, as the results of by-election would has no bearing on the position of the state government amidst the looming talks of snap elections following the 2020 political crisis. There are 59 state seats in Perak in which 32 formed the Perikatan Nasional (PN) coalition comprising 25 BN (UMNO), 4 BERSATU and 3 PAS; compare to 24 seats holds by Pakatan Harapan (PH) coalition comprising 16 DAP, 5 AMANAH, 3 PKR; meanwhile 2 Independent and 1 GERAKAN; as just upon the seat vacancy. One of the independent assemblyman, Hasnul Zulkarnain Abdul Munaim, 2 weeks later joined PN's component BERSATU on 29 July 2020.

== Nominations ==
Perak Menteri Besar and BERSATU chief, Ahmad Faizal Azumu has said that Perikatan Nasional (PN) will field a candidate from UMNO to defend the Slim state seat in the by-election. Barisan Nasional (BN) secretary-general Annuar Musa said UMNO will pick the candidate for the Slim by-election, in which BN with Muafakat Nasional (MN)'s UMNO-PAS and BERSATU together will set up a joined committee named Muafakat Nasional 'Plus'. BN has named acting Tanjung Malim UMNO chief Mohd Zaidi Aziz, 43, as its candidate for the Slim state by-election.

Pakatan Harapan (PH) secretariat secretary Saifuddin Nasution Ismail had confirmed that PH will not be contesting the by-election for the Slim state seat. PH is to make way to former BERSATU chairman Dr Mahathir Mohamad’s faction to contest instead. Ahead of the by-election, Dr Mahathir has announces the formation by the initially dubbed "BERSATU Blackout" faction's new party, Parti Pejuang Tanah Air (Pejuang) or the Fighters of the Nation Party. The yet-to-be registered Pejuang party has also names Syariah lawyer, Amir Khusyairi Mohamad Tanusi, 38, as their candidate with PH endorsement for the Slim poll, who will be contesting as an Independent.

On nomination day, BN's Mohd Zaidi and Pejuang's Amir Khusyairi (tree symbol) along with another independent, former teacher Santharasekaran a/l Subramaniam (book symbol), 44, filed their nomination papers to set for a three-cornered fight in the by-election. There were also two other individuals who turned up that morning but didn't submit their nomination papers as independent candidates due to personal technical reasons.

== Controversies and issues ==
Members of the BERSATU Youth (ARMADA) were "booed" during the launching ceremony of the BN Youth Campaign Machinery. Supporters of BN started "booing" the ARMADA members after BN Chairman, Ahmad Zahid Hamidi announced that BERSATU will join the Muafakat Nasional pact.

On the morning of poling day, several voters were prevented from entering a polling centre merely for wearing shorts which led to a protest when the affected voters unable to cast their ballots. EC chairman Abdul Ghani Salleh had later explained it was a miscommunication as there is no Act that forbids a voter donning shorts from entering a polling centre.

== Results ==
Perak state by-election, 2020: Slim Upon the death of the incumbent, Mohd. Khusairi Abdul Talib
Party	Candidate	Votes	%	∆%
BN	Mohd Zaidi Aziz	13,060	84.53	+17.61
Independent	Amir Khusyairi Mohd Tanusi	2,115	13.69	-19.39
Independent	Santharasekaran Subramaniam	276	1.78	N/A
Total valid votes		15,451	100.00	
Total rejected ballots		327		
Unreturned ballots		18		
Turnout		15,796		
Registered electors		23,094		
Majority		10,945		
BN hold		Swing		+18.5
"Pejuang lost, but the heat's on PPBM, says analyst". Free Malaysia Today. Archived from the original on September 27, 2020.

=== Results based on polling district ===
BN won all districts.

Polling District	Polling District Code	Polling Station	Electors （2016）
Ladang Sungkai	077/58/01	Sekolah Jenis Kebangsaan (Tamil) Ladang Sungkai	
Pekan Lama	077/58/02	Sekolah Kebangsaan Changkat Sulaiman	
Changkat Sulaiman	077/58/03	Sekolah Kebangsaan Changkat Sulaiman	
Trolak Utara	077/58/04	Sekolah Kebangsaan Trolak Utara	
Trolak Selatan	077/58/05	Sekolah Kebangsaan Trolak Utara	
Trolak	077/58/06	Sekolah Jenis Kebangsaan (Tamil) Trolak	
Pekan Slim	077/58/07	Sekolah Kebangsaan Slim River	
Sungai Slim Utara	077/58/08	Sekolah Kebangsaan Aminuddin Baki	
Kampong Kuala Slim	077/58/09	Sekolah Kebangsaan Kuala Slim	
Ladang Kelapa Bali	077/58/10	Sekolah Jenis Kebangsaan (Tamil) Ldg Kelapa Bali	
FELDA Gunong Besout II	077/58/11	Sekolah Kebangsaan Besout 3	
FELDA Gunong Besout I	077/58/12	Sekolah Kebangsaan Seri Besout	
FELDA Gunong Besout V	077/58/13	Sekolah Kebangsaan Besout 5	
Undi Awal	077/58/00		
Undi Pos			

== Previous results ==
Perak state election, 2018: Slim
Party	Candidate	Votes	%	∆%
BN	Mohd. Khusairi Abdul Talib	8,327	44.83	-14.96
PH	Mohd Amran Ibrahim	6,144	33.08	+33.08
PAS	Muhammad Zulfadli Zainal	4,103	22.09	-17.04
Total valid votes		18,574	100.00	
Total rejected ballots		350		
Unreturned ballots		0		
Turnout		18,574	80.95	
Registered electors		23,377		
Majority		2,183		
BN hold		Swing		
"undi.info-SLIM (P77-N58)". MalaysiaKini. 2020. Archived from the original on 19 July 2020.
