= Aminuddin Md Hanafiah =

Malaysian politician

Yang Berbahagia Dato' Aminuddin Md Hanafiah DPMP AMP PPT

Member of the Perak State Legislative Assembly for Hulu Kinta
- In office 5 May 2013 – 9 May 2018
- Preceded by: Rusnah Kassim (BN–UMNO)
- Succeeded by: Muhamad Arafat Varisai Mahamad (PH–PKR)
- Majority: 6,118 (2013)

Personal details
- Party: United Malays National Organisation (UMNO)
- Other political affiliations: Barisan Nasional (BN)
- Occupation: Politician

Aminuddin bin Md Hanafiah is a Malaysian politician who served as Member of the Perak State Legislative Assembly (MLA) for Hulu Kinta from May 2013 to May 2018. He is a member and Division Chief of Tambun of the United Malays National Organisation (UMNO), a component party of Barisan Nasional (BN) coalitions.

== Election results ==
Perak State Legislative Assembly
Year	Constituency	Candidate	Votes	Pct	Opponent(s)	Votes	Pct	Ballots cast	Majority	Turnout
2013	N24 Hulu Kinta	Aminuddin Md Hanafiah (UMNO)	18,893	59.19%	Matinagaran Arumugam (PKR)	12,775	40.02%	32,536	6,118	84.70%
2013	N24 Hulu Kinta	Aminuddin Md Hanafiah (UMNO)	18,893	59.19%	Sulaiman Zakariya (IND)	250	0.78%	32,536	6,118	84.70%
2018	N24 Hulu Kinta	Aminuddin Md Hanafiah (UMNO)	14,053	34.56%	Muhamad Arafat Varisai Mahamad (PKR)	17,766	43.70%	40,659	3,713	81.39%
2018	N24 Hulu Kinta	Aminuddin Md Hanafiah (UMNO)	14,053	34.56%	Mat Salleh Said (PAS)	7,425	18.26%	40,659	3,713	81.39%
2018	N24 Hulu Kinta	Aminuddin Md Hanafiah (UMNO)	14,053	34.56%	Murugiah Subramaniam (IND)	217	0.53%	40,659	3,713	81.39%

Parliament of Malaysia
Year	Constituency	Candidate	Votes	Pct	Opponent(s)	Votes	Pct	Ballots cast	Majority	Turnout
2022	P063 Tambun	Aminuddin Md Hanafiah (UMNO)	28,140	22.55%	Anwar Ibrahim (PKR)	49,625	39.77%	126,444	3,736	77.71%
2022	P063 Tambun	Aminuddin Md Hanafiah (UMNO)	28,140	22.55%	Ahmad Faizal Azumu (BERSATU)	45,889	36.78%	126,444	3,736	77.71%
2022	P063 Tambun	Aminuddin Md Hanafiah (UMNO)	28,140	22.55%	Abdul Rahim Tahir (PEJUANG)	1,115	0.89%	126,444	3,736	77.71%

== Honours ==
- Perak
  - Knight Commander of the Order of the Perak State Crown (DPMP) – Dato' (2017)
  - Member of the Order of the Perak State Crown (AMP) (2009)
  - Recipient of the Distinguished Conduct Medal (PPT) (2006)
