= Democracy tree =

Rain tree in Malaysia

Coordinates: 4.6785°N 101.2162°E

The Democracy Tree (Bahasa Malaysia: Pokok Demokrasi) is a rain tree in Malaysia, named for its role in the 2009 Perak constitutional crisis. It is noted as the venue where 27 Perak state lawmakers from Pakatan Rakyat comprising Democratic Action Party, Parti Islam Se-Malaysia and Parti Keadilan Rakyat, held an 'emergency assembly' on 3 March 2009. The tree was located about 100m from the Perak Darul Ridzuan building which houses the state assembly. The assembly was held under the tree by the state assemblymen after being blocked by the police from entering the premises. Dr. Zambry, from UMNO, and recently suspended assembly secretary Abdullah Antong Sabri had claimed that the sitting was invalid because it did not have the consent of Sultan Azlan Shah.

== Assembly ==
The 27 assemblymen who turned up – all from the Pakatan Rakyat – stood around V. Sivakumar, the speaker, who had donned his speaker's robe. The sitting convened at 10.20am.

== Motions ==
Three motions were passed within 15 during the 'emergency assembly'. The motions are:

- to support Datuk Seri Mohammad Nizar Jamaluddin as the rightful Menteri Besar, tabled by Titi Serong assemblyperson Khalil Idham Lim.
- to dissolve the State Assembly, tabled by Teja assemblyperson Chang Lih Kang.
- to adopt the order made by the Rights and Special Privileges Committee to suspend Datuk Dr Zambry Abdul Kadir and his six executive councillors, tabled by Sitiawan assemblyperson Ngeh Koo Ham.

== Plaque ==
On 8 March 2009, a plaque was subsequently placed by the assemblymen to commemorate the assembly sitting. Many local residents came to take photographs with the plaque and tree. However a few days later, the plaque was found vandalized repeatedly before finally removed by the Ipoh City Council (MBI).

On 22 March 2009, five pieces of the broken plaque destroyed by vandals were auctioned away by the Pakatan Rakyat to supporters. A total of RM42,900, excluding donations, was raised in the auction.

== Aftermath ==
A DVD featuring the tree was released during ceramahs but it was subsequently banned. Tebing Tinggi assemblyman Ong Boon Piow was arrested for allegedly violating the Film Censorship Act 2002 for “manufacturing, circulating, distributing, and displaying the content of the DVD without first getting a ‘B’ certificate from the Film Censorship Board.
