= Paul Yong Choo Kiong =

Malaysian politician and convicted rapist

- 杨祖强

Member of the Perak State Executive Council (Housing and Local Government, Public Transport, Non-Muslim Affairs and New Villages)
- In office 19 May 2018 – 10 March 2020; Suspended : 24 August 2019 – 15 November 2019
- Monarch: Nazrin Shah
- Menteri Besar: Ahmad Faizal Azumu
- Preceded by: Rusnah Kassim (Housing, Local Government); Mah Hang Soon (Public Transport, Non-Muslim Affairs, New Villages)
- Succeeded by: Nolee Ashilin Mohamed Radzi (Housing, Local Government); Mohd Zolkafly Harun (Public Transport); Ahmad Faizal Azumu (Non-Muslim Affairs, New Villages)
- Constituency: Tronoh

Member of the Perak State Legislative Assembly for Tronoh
- In office 5 May 2013 – 19 November 2022
- Preceded by: Sivakumar Varatharaju (PR–DAP)
- Succeeded by: Steven Tiw Tee Siang (PH–DAP)
- Majority: 6,191 (2013); 10,501 (2018)

Personal details
- Born: Paul Yong Choo Kiong; 23 September 1970 (age 56) Sitiawan, Perak, Malaysia
- Citizenship: Malaysian
- Party: Democratic Action Party (DAP) (2004–2020); Malaysian United Indigenous Party (BERSATU) (2021–2022); Parti Bangsa Malaysia (PBM) (since 2022)
- Other political affiliations: Pakatan Rakyat (PR) (2008–2015); Pakatan Harapan (PH) (2015–2020); Perikatan Nasional (PN) (2021–2022)
- Spouse: Too Choon Looi
- Children: Bryan Yong Wu Sean (son)
- Education: Akamai University
- Occupation: Politician
- Criminal information
- Status: Incarcerated since 1 October 2025
- Conviction: Rape
- Penalty: 8 years imprisonment and two strokes of the cane

Details
- Imprisoned at: Kajang Prison
- Paul Yong Choo Kiong on Facebook

Paul Yong Choo Kiong (Chinese: 杨祖强; pinyin: Yáng Zǔqiáng; Pe̍h-ōe-jī: Iûⁿ Cho͘-kiông; born 23 September 1970) is a former Malaysian politician. He served as a Member of the Perak State Executive Council (EXCO) in the Pakatan Harapan (PH) state administration under former Menteri Besar Ahmad Faizal Azumu from May 2018 until the collapse of that administration in March 2020. He also served as the Member of the Perak State Legislative Assembly (MLA) for Tronoh from May 2013 to November 2022.

Originally a member of the Democratic Action Party (DAP), Yong defected in March 2020 and subsequently joined the Malaysian United Indigenous Party (BERSATU) in 2021 and later the Parti Bangsa Malaysia (PBM).

In 2022, Yong was convicted of raping his Indonesian domestic helper. After exhausting all legal appeals, he was imprisoned in October 2025.

== Early life and education ==
Paul Yong Choo Kiong was born in Sitiawan, Perak. His family were settlers of the new village program introduced during the British rule of Malaya.

Yong received his early education at SJKC Pei Min Ayer Tawar, and his secondary education at SMK Ambrose, Ayer Tawar, and Nan Hua High School. He obtained a Master of Business Administration degree from Akamai University, a correspondence-based institution. This qualification was later publicly disputed by opposition politician Wee Ka Siong, who alleged it was from an unaccredited 'degree mill'.

== Political career ==
Yong entered politics in 2004, becoming the Political Secretary to Ngeh Koo Ham in the Sitiawan Branch of DAP. He was first elected to the Perak State Legislative Assembly as the MLA for Tronoh in the 2013 Perak state election.

In the 2018 Malaysian general election, Yong retained the seat as an incumbent, defeating his closest rival from the Malaysian Chinese Association (MCA) by a majority of 10,501 votes. Following the election, he was appointed a member of the Perak State Executive Council (EXCO) in the new PH state administration, serving under Menteri Besar Ahmad Faizal Azumu.

Yong's tenure as an EXCO member ended in March 2020 after he and two other assemblymen defected from DAP to become independents, a move that led to the collapse of the PH state government in Perak. He subsequently joined BERSATU in March 2021, and later moved to PBM in January 2022.

Following his High Court rape conviction in July 2022, Yong announced he would take a break from politics and resigned from his party positions in PBM to focus on his appeal. Although convicted, he was not immediately disqualified as MLA for Tronoh, as his position was protected while the appeal process was ongoing.

Yong did not defend his Tronoh state seat in the 2022 Perak state election, and his term as an assemblyman ended in November 2022. His political career concluded on 1 October 2025, when the Federal Court dismissed his final appeal, and he was immediately imprisoned.

== Rape conviction ==
=== Accusation and political context ===
In July 2019, allegations emerged that Yong had raped his Indonesian domestic helper. On 23 August 2019, he was charged in the Ipoh Sessions Court under Section 376 of the Penal Code. The charge alleged the offence took place in a room at his home between 8:15 pm and 9:15 pm on 7 July 2019.

The case was immediately surrounded by allegations of political infighting. Fellow Perak DAP politician Ngeh Koo Ham publicly claimed he had met a person who was allegedly paid RM100,000 to assist the maid in lodging the police report. The controversy led to Yong taking a leave of absence from his EXCO duties. It also caused a rift in the Perak DAP, with assemblymen Leong Cheok Keng (Malim Nawar) and Leow Thye Yih (Pokok Assam) resigning from their state committee posts in protest of chairman Nga Kor Ming's handling of the situation.

In December 2019, Yong reported a break-in at his house, claiming important documents were stolen. Police confirmed the break-in and the theft of two safe-boxes, but noted that other expensive items, such as a large-screen TV and a motorcycle, were left untouched.

=== High Court trial ===
The trial was transferred to the High Court and began on 5 April 2021. The prosecution's case relied on testimony from the victim, who was kept under the witness protection program, and medical experts. An obstetrician and gynaecologist testified to finding a fresh abrasion on the victim's posterior fourchette, consistent with penetration. An investigating officer also told the court that eight spots believed to be semen stains were found on a mattress cover and that the victim claimed to have mopped semen stains off the floor.

The defence, however, highlighted that a chemist who gave evidence on 17 August 2021 found no traces of semen on the clothing, mop, or mattress cover sent for analysis.

On 7 December 2021, the High Court ruled that the prosecution had established a prima facie case, ordering Yong to enter his defence. Yong's defence was that he was the victim of a political ploy. His wife, Too Choon Lai, testified that Yong was with a friend at the time of the alleged incident and that she was only away from the home for 10 minutes, arguing the rape could not have occurred in that timeframe.

=== Verdict and appeals ===
On 27 July 2022, the High Court found Yong guilty of rape. The judge, Datuk Abdul Wahab Mohamed, ruled that the victim's testimony was "credible and honest" and that the defence had failed to raise reasonable doubt. The judge dismissed the political-ploy defence as unproven. Yong was sentenced to 13 years in jail and two strokes of the cane, but was granted a stay of execution pending appeal.

On 1 March 2024, the Court of Appeal upheld the conviction, but reduced his jail term from 13 to eight years. The sentence of two strokes of the cane was maintained.

In February 2025, during the final appeal process, it was reported that the former maid, who had returned to Indonesia, had retracted her accusation in a written statement. In the statement, she claimed she had fabricated the allegation because she was not permitted to terminate her employment contract and return home.

On 1 October 2025, the Federal Court dismissed Yong's final appeal against his conviction and sentence. He was subsequently sent to Kajang Prison to immediately begin serving his eight-year jail term and receive the two strokes of cane.

== Election results ==
Perak State Legislative Assembly
Year	Constituency	Candidate	Votes	Pct	Opponent(s)	Votes	Pct	Ballots cast	Majority	Turnout
2013	N33 Tronoh	Paul Yong Choo Kiong (DAP)	13,243	64.10%	Yip Sze Choy (MCA)	7,052	34.20%	20,646	6,191	76.80%
2018	N33 Tronoh	Paul Yong Choo Kiong (DAP)	15,061	74.20%	Yuen Chan How (MCA)	4,560	16.90%	20,299	10,501	75.40%
2018	N33 Tronoh	Paul Yong Choo Kiong (DAP)	15,061	74.20%	Andy Chin Kwai Heng (PSM)	333	1.20%	20,299	10,501	75.40%
