= Tronoh (state constituency) =

Political subdivision in Malaysia

Perak constituency

State constituency
- Legislature: Perak State Legislative Assembly
MLA
Steven Tiw Tee Siang
PH
- Constituency created: 2003
- First contested: 2004
- Last contested: 2022

Demographics
- Electors (2022): 38,119

Tronoh is a state constituency in Perak, Malaysia, that has been represented in the Perak State Legislative Assembly.

== Demographics ==
Ethnic breakdown of Tronoh's electorate as of 2022
1. Chinese (57.6%)
2. Malay (26.6%)
3. Indian (15.0%)
4. Other ethnicities (0.82%)

== History ==
=== Polling districts ===
According to the gazette issued on 31 October 2022, the Tronoh constituency has a total of 12 polling districts.

State constituency	Polling districts	Code	Location
Tronoh（N33）	Gunong Hijau	066/33/01	SJK (C) Gunong Hijau
Tronoh（N33）	Jalan Lahat	066/33/02	SJK (C) Yit Chee
Tronoh（N33）	Jalan Siputeh	066/33/03	SJK (C) Yit Chee
Tronoh（N33）	Pekan Pusing	066/33/04	SK Pusing; SMK Pusing
Tronoh（N33）	Batu Gajah Utara	066/33/05	SMK Sultan Yussuf
Tronoh（N33）	Batu Gajah Selatan	066/33/06	SMK Toh Indera Wangsa Ahmad
Tronoh（N33）	Penempatan India	066/33/07	SJK (T) Changkat
Tronoh（N33）	Bemban	066/33/08	SJK (C) Bemban
Tronoh（N33）	Siputeh	066/33/09	SK Siputeh
Tronoh（N33）	Tronoh	066/33/10	SMK Tronoh
Tronoh（N33）	Nalla	066/33/11	SJK (C) Kampung Nalla
Tronoh（N33）	Kampong Bali	066/33/12	SJK (C) Kampung Bali

=== Representation history ===
Members of the Legislative Assembly for Tronoh
Assembly	No	Years	Name	Party
Constituency created from Lahat, Belanja, Bota and Tualang Sekah
11th	N33	2004-2008	Lee Kon Yin (李官仁)	BN (MCA)
12th	N33	2008-2013	V. Sivakumar	PR (DAP)
13th	N33	2013-2018	Paul Yong Choo Kiong (杨祖強)	PR (DAP)
14th	N33	2018-2020	Paul Yong Choo Kiong (杨祖強)	PH (DAP)
14th	N33	2020-2021	Paul Yong Choo Kiong (杨祖強)	IND
14th	N33	2021-2022	Paul Yong Choo Kiong (杨祖強)	PN (BERSATU)
14th	N33	2022	Paul Yong Choo Kiong (杨祖強)	PBM
15th	N33	2022–present	Steven Tiw Tee Siang (张迪翔)	PH (DAP)

== Election results ==
Perak state election, 2022
Party	Candidate	Votes	%	∆%
PH	Steven Tiw Tee Siang	15,602	63.35	▲63.35
PN	Sin Koon Yen	4,230	17.17	▲17.17
BN	Leong Chee Wai	3,351	13.61	▼9.24
PBM	Bryan Yong Wu Sean	710	2.88	▲2.88
GTA	Roslan Ismail	478	1.94	▲1.94
Independent	Meor Shahimudin Hashim	259	1.05	▲1.05
Total valid votes		24,630	100.00	
Total rejected ballots		373		
Unreturned ballots		60		
Turnout		25,063	64.61	▼14.67
Registered electors		38,119		
Majority		11,372	46.18	▼6.45
PH hold		Swing		

Perak state election, 2018
Party	Candidate	Votes	%	∆%
PH	Paul Yong Choo Kiong	15,061	75.48	▲75.48
BN	Yuen Chan How	4,560	22.85	▼11.90
Parti Sosialis Malaysia	Chin Kwai Heng	333	1.67	▲1.67
Total valid votes		19,954	98.30	
Total rejected ballots		285	1.40	
Unreturned ballots		60	0.30	
Turnout		20,299	79.28	▲2.28
Registered electors		26,927		
Majority		10,501	52.63	▲22.13
PH hold		Swing		
Source(s) "RESULTS OF CONTESTED ELECTION AND STATEMENTS OF THE POLL AFTER THE OFFICIAL ADDITION OF VOTES".

Perak state election, 2013
Party	Candidate	Votes	%	∆%
DAP	Paul Yong Choo Kiong	13,243	65.25	▲7.23
BN	Yip Sze Choy	7,052	34.75	▼7.23
Total valid votes		20,295	97.98	
Total rejected ballots		351	1.69	
Unreturned ballots		68	0.33	
Turnout		20,714	77.00	▲8.77
Registered electors		26,885		
Majority		6,191	30.50	▲14.46
DAP hold		Swing		
Source(s) "KEPUTUSAN PILIHAN RAYA UMUM DEWAN UNDANGAN NEGERI".

Perak state election, 2008
Party	Candidate	Votes	%	∆%
DAP	V. Sivakumar	9,302	58.02	▲13.84
BN	Lee Kim Choy	6,731	41.98	▼13.84
Total valid votes		16,033	97.49	
Total rejected ballots		340	2.07	
Unreturned ballots		73	0.44	
Turnout		16,446	68.23	▲2.45
Registered electors		24,103		
Majority		2,571	16.04	▲4.40
DAP gain from BN		Swing		?
Source(s) "KEPUTUSAN PILIHAN RAYA UMUM DEWAN UNDANGAN NEGERI PERAK BAGI TAHUN 2008".

Perak state election, 2004
Party	Candidate	Votes	%	∆%
BN	Lee Kon Yin	8,419	55.82	
DAP	Lim Pek Har	6,664	44.18	
Total valid votes		15,083	97.33	
Total rejected ballots		378	2.44	
Unreturned ballots		35	0.23	
Turnout		15,496	65.78	
Registered electors		23,556		
Majority		1,755	11.64	
This was a new constituency created.
Source(s) "KEPUTUSAN PILIHAN RAYA UMUM DEWAN UNDANGAN NEGERI PERAK BAGI TAHUN 2004".
