= Nizar v Zambry =

Malaysian court case

Mohammad Nizar Bin Jamaluddin v Zambry Bin Abd. Kadir
- Court: High Court of Malaya at Kuala Lumpur
- Decided: 11 May 2009 (High Court); 22 May 2009 (Court of Appeal); 9 February 2010 (Federal Court)
- Citation: [2009] 6 CLJ 403 (High Court)

Case history
- Prior action: High Court ruled in favour of Nizar
- Subsequent actions: Court of Appeal overturned decision Federal Court affirmed Court of Appeal ruling

Court membership
- Judges sitting: Abdul Aziz Abdul Rahim J. (High Court); Ramly Ali JCA (Court of Appeal stay)

Case opinions
- Menteri Besar can only be removed by a vote of no confidence in the assembly

Keywords
- Constitutional law, Menteri Besar, vote of no confidence, Perak constitutional crisis

Mohammad Nizar Bin Jamaluddin v Zambry Bin Abd. Kadir was a case decided in the High Court of Kuala Lumpur, Malaysia. The case was brought by Menteri Besar of Perak state, Mohammad Nizar Jamaluddin, against Zambry Abdul Kadir, who acted as Menteri Besar after three members of the state legislative assembly defected from Nizar's Pakatan Rakyat and threw their support behind Zambry's Barisan Nasional coalition. The subsequent confusion and controversy regarding the state government resulted in the 2009 Perak constitutional crisis. In his judgment handed down on 11 May 2009, Justice Abdul Aziz Abdul Rahim ruled that Nizar was and had always been the rightful Menteri Besar, and ordered Zambry to immediately cease acting as Menteri Besar. The Court of Appeal granted a stay of execution of the High Court's order the following day, further confusing the situation.

On 22 May 2009, the appellate court allowed an appeal by Barisan Nasional's Zambry Abd Kadir to reverse the Kuala Lumpur High Court decision that declared Mohammad Nizar Jamaluddin as the rightful menteri besar of Perak. On 9 February 2010, five-member panel of Federal Court ruled unanimously Zambry Abdul Kadir is the valid Menteri Besar of Perak. The federal court bench found that Court of Appeal was justified in reversing the High Court decision which had earlier declared Mohammad Nizar Jamaluddin as the rightful Perak menteri besar.

== Background ==
Three members of the Perak state assembly who had previously supported the Pakatan Rakyat state government announced they were becoming political independents in February 2009, and that they would support the Barisan Nasional on matters of confidence and supply. Nizar asked Sultan Azlan Shah of Perak to dissolve the state assembly and call for new elections to resolve the political impasse. However, the Sultan rejected Nizar's request, ordered him to resign as Menteri Besar, and swore in Zambry as the new Menteri Besar. Nizar then filed suit against Zambry in the Kuala Lumpur High Court.

== Case history ==
The first judge to hear the case was Judicial Commissioner Mohamad Ariff Md Yusof. However, on 25 February 2009, he recused himself, and was replaced by Justice Lau Bee Lan. On 6 March 2009, Lau submitted four questions of law to be resolved by the Federal Court. However, the Federal Court held that it did not have jurisdiction over a question of law regarding the Perak state constitution. Lau was then replaced by Justice Abdul Aziz Abdul Rahim on 1 April 2009.

== Judgment ==
Aziz's judgment held that in line with the case of Stephen Kalong Ningkan, former Chief Minister of Sarawak, the leader of a state government can only be toppled by a vote of no confidence in the state assembly. Aziz first dealt with the submissions of Attorney-General Tan Sri Abdul Gani Patail, an intervenor in the case; the Attorney-General had submitted that a state assembly can only be dissolved when the Menteri Besar loses the confidence of the legislature or at the expiration of the legislature's term, and that under Article 16(6) of the state constitution, Nizar had automatically resigned his position as Menteri Besar. Aziz rejected both submissions, finding that Article 36 provided for "unlimited circumstances for the menteri besar to request for dissolution from the Sultan," and that although Article 16(6) suggests the Menteri Besar should resign, it cannot automatically compel him to do so.

Perak State Legal Adviser Datuk Ahmad Kamal Md Shahid had submitted an affidavit supporting Zambry in the proceedings. However, Aziz found it unreliable, ruling that "It was [Kamal's] own admission that he was instructed by [Zambry's] counsel to affirm the affidavit. The word instructed is a very strong word. ... To me, he is not a neutral or impartial witness; his testimony was coloured by the instruction that he received." Kamal had claimed that Nizar requested the dissolution of the state assembly under Article 16(6), which would mean Nizar had already lost the confidence of the state assembly. However, Nizar insisted his request was under Article 36(2), which allows the Menteri Besar to request dissolution for any reason.

Aziz told the court that:

Once a Menteri Besar is appointed, he is answerable only to the assembly. Hence, the sultan cannot order for his resignation but this must be done through a vote of no confidence at the state legislative assembly. However, based on democratic practise, the only measure to oust Mohammad Nizar was through a vote of no confidence against him. As I have stated earlier any vote of no confidence should be on the floor of the state legislative assembly. Only under these circumstances can the menteri besar be forced to resign.

Based on this, Aziz ruled that Nizar "is, and was, at all material times the chief minister of Perak." Aziz's judgment granted the five declarations sought by Nizar:

1. That Nizar was the rightful Menteri Besar;
2. That there had been no dissolution of the Perak Assembly, no motion of no-confidence, and that Nizar had not resigned;
3. A writ of quo warranto against Zambry ordering him to show cause for the authority under which he acted as Menteri Besar;
4. That Zambry had no right to act as or occupy the office of Menteri Besar, and was not the Menteri Besar at any material time;
5. An injunction preventing Zambry from acting as Menteri Besar.

Nizar had originally also sought punitive, aggravated and exemplary damages from Zambry, but withdrew the request a week before the judgment. Zambry's lawyer, Cecil Abraham, asked Aziz for a stay of the order after the judgment was handed down, but Aziz refused the request, asking Abraham to put it to him in writing.

== Reactions ==
Nizar called the decision "a victory for the people of Malaysia. It also shows the judiciary can be depended on," and stated his government would return to work the following day. Zambry said he and his colleagues would immediately vacate the state secretariat. At 4 in the afternoon of 11 May 2009, the day the judgment was handed down, the Federal Reserve Unit locked down the state secretariat. Later in the evening, Nizar's executive council met and agreed to suspend the state secretary and legal adviser for their conduct during the crisis, and announced they would "send a letter to the Sultan to seek an audience to ask for the dissolution of the assembly so the people can exercise their right to choose their government." Nizar also insisted that as a result of the judgment in Nizar v. Zambry, 7 May 2009 sitting of the state assembly was unconstitutional and void because it had been called by Zambry, who was not in a position to act as Menteri Besar.

== Appeal ==
On 12 May 2009, Zambry filed an appeal at the Court of Appeal. Sitting alone, judge Ramly Ali granted him a stay of execution on the High Court ruling. Lawyers and the press expressed surprise at Ramly's hearing the appeal alone, as there were three panels, each comprising three judges on the Court of Appeal, hearing cases the same day. Some also criticised the granting of a permanent, as opposed to temporary, stay. Former Court of Appeal judge N.H. Chan was particularly critical of Ramly's refusal to release his grounds of judgment, stating that the stay, along with the Federal Court's handling of the constitutional crisis, had "brought discredit to the judiciary."

Because of the stay, it was then unclear who is the Menteri Besar. Zambry has refused to address the question, while Nizar's camp asserts that the stay does not overrule the High Court judgment, and as such Nizar remains Menteri Besar. The Malaysian Bar Council's interpretation of the stay is that Zambry now acts as a caretaker Menteri Besar. The Court of Appeal overturned the High Court decision and declared Zambry the rightful Menteri Besar.

The Case went further up to the Federal Court with Nizar appealing the verdict of the Court of Appeal. Ultimately, Nizar lost the legal proceedings when, in February 2010, the Federal Court ruled Zambry to be the lawful Menteri Besar.
