= 2009 Perak constitutional crisis =

The 2009 Perak constitutional crisis was a political dispute in Malaysia over the legitimacy of the Perak state government formed in February 2009. It began when three Pakatan Rakyat state legislators defected, causing a collapse of the state government. The Sultan of Perak then refused Menteri Besar Mohammad Nizar Jamaluddin's request to dissolve the state assembly and call elections. Instead, the Barisan Nasional (BN), with support from the three defecting assemblymen, formed the new state government.

The BN state government's legitimacy and the Sultan's decision not to dissolve the state assembly was disputed vehemently by Pakatan Rakyat politicians. A series of court cases ensued between Nizar and the new Menteri Besar (First Minister), Zambry Abdul Kadir. Ultimately, in February 2010, the Federal Court confirmed that Zambry government was lawful.

== Overview ==
The crisis in Perak began with the announcement by Barisan Nasional's Nasarudin Hashim of his desire to cross the floor to Pakatan Rakyat. This was then followed by the re-defection of Nasaruddin to Barisan Nasional, and the declaration by three Pakatan Rakyat representatives, Deputy Speaker Hee Yit Foong, senior state Executive Council member Jamaluddin Mohd Radzi and Osman Jailu, of their intentions to sit as independents while supporting the Barisan Nasional in confidence matters. The Sultan granted an audience to the Prime Minister (who is the head of Perak Barisan Nasional); at this meeting the PM claimed that the Barisan Nasional had the support of the majority of peoples elected representatives in the State Assembly. The Sultan ordered the PM to prove he had a majority. The PM left and returned later (the same day) with 31 elected members of the State Assembly all of whom told the sultan that they had no confidence in the Pakatan Rakyat and that they would support a Barisan Nasional government. Prior to the defections, Pakatan Rakyat had 32 representatives while Barisan Nasional had 27 representatives. The defections meant that the state now has 28 Pakatan Rakyat representatives, 28 Barisan Nasional representatives, and 3 independent representatives who pledged confidence to Barisan Nasional.

The morality of crossing the floor, the Sultan's power to dismiss the Menteri Besar (First Minister), the validity of pre-signed undated resignation letters, the powers of the Speaker of the House and power of the Election Commission were major issues of this constitutional crisis. On 11 May 2009, the Kuala Lumpur High Court ruled that the Sultan was not constitutionally permitted to dismiss the Menteri Besar, and that Nizar had always been the rightful head of the state government. On 22 May 2009, the Court of Appeal overturned the High Court decision, and confirmed that the Barisan Nasional which has sworn in a new chief minister and parliamentary speaker for Perak should remain in power. Furthermore, the Court of Appeal found the trial judge to have erred in confusing the issue of whether the government has lost the confidence of the majority of the house with the issue of whether the Sultan has the power to dismiss the government. However Zambry's position as Menteri Besar will not go unchallenged despite the ruling as Pakatan Rakyat leaders have indicated they intend to file an appeal.

== Defections ==
The crisis began on 25 January 2009 when a member of the Barisan Nasional coalition's main component party - UMNO, Nasarudin Hashim announced his decision to leave the party and join PKR. Pakatan Rakyat leader, Anwar Ibrahim made continued claims of the possibility of more Perak and also Federal lawmakers from Barisan Nasional crossing the floor to Pakatan Rakyat. Mohammad Nizar Jamaluddin, the state's First Minister, also hinted at the possibility of another three state lawmakers from Barisan Nasional defecting over to Pakatan Rakyat. Nasarudin Hashim's defection angered the then Prime Minister Abdullah Ahmad Badawi, who chided Nasarudin for being weak and claimed that Nasarudin's defection was because Nasarudin was disappointed in not being offered any senior party posts. Nasarudin rebutted the Prime Minister's statement and claimed his decision was due to the mood of his constituents. On 29 January 2009 then Finance Minister Najib Razak took over from Mohammad Tajol Rosli Ghazali as the Perak UMNO chief, as Tajol Rosli resigned over Nasaruddin's party shift.

On 30 January 2009 two state assemblymen from PKR, senior state exco member and one time candidate for First Minister Jamaluddin Mohd Radzi and Mohd Osman Mohd Jailu, who were both previously accused of corruption went missing from their homes. The State Assembly speaker V. Sivakumar of the DAP then declared the seats held by Jamaluddin and Osman vacant and informed the Election Commission to initiate a by-election in the two ridings. On 2 February 2009 both assemblymen reappeared and declared themselves independent assemblymen while pledging support for Barisan Nasional in confidence matters. The Election Commission then decided to not heed the speaker's requests and states that no by-elections would be held for the seats held by Jamaluddin and Osman.

The deputy speaker of the state assembly from the DAP Hee Yit Foong declared herself independent on 3 February 2009 with the same terms as Jamaluddin and Osman - supporting Barisan Nasional in matters of confidence. Nizar had an audience with the Sultan of Perak Sultan Azlan Shah and requested a dissolution of the state assembly to pave way for a snap election on 4 February 2009. Najib in his capacity as Perak UMNO chief had an audience with Sultan Azlan Shah together with Hee, Jamaluddin and Osman. The latest Pakatan Rakyat lawmaker Nasaruddin announced his return to UMNO citing that "[He] want[s] stability in Perak." Najib, then sought royal consent for Barisan Nasional to form the new government.

An almost similar scenario occurred in the state of Sabah following the 1994 state election whereby Parti Bersatu Sabah (PBS) won 25 seats against 23 won by Barisan Nasional. Defections by representatives of PBS into Barisan Nasional gave the latter the requisite majority to form government in Sabah.

== New state government ==
The Sultan Azlan Shah announced his decision to refuse Nizar's request for a dissolution of the state assembly and asked Nizar and his cabinet to resign, citing his discretion under Article XVIII (2)(b) of the Perak State Constitution after being satisfied that Nizar no longer commanded the support of the majority in the house of assembly. DAP advisor, Lim Kit Siang, charged that the sultan was obliged to act on the advice of the Menteri Besar and call fresh elections, citing Article 16(6) of the Perak State Constitution.

Nizar refused to resign and asked the sultan to reconsider and dissolve the assembly, citing reasons of democracy, with backing from leaders of Pakatan Rakyat. The police cordoned off the state secretariat building and demanded Nizar's cabinet to vacate the building. Later in the evening, the sultan asked Zambry Abdul Kadir to form the next government, removed Nizar from the office of Menteri Besar and swore in Zambry as the new First Minister on 6 February 2009.

On the morning of 6 February 2009, Nizar and his exco members returned to the Menteri Besar's office to find that their offices had been cleared. Nizar held a press conference in the office premises along with his exco, but they were promptly ordered to leave by the state secretary on grounds that they had breached an earlier agreement to only take his personal belongings. Nizar was escorted out of the office by the police 45 minutes later. Some members of the Bar Council defended the sultan's decision saying that His Majesty had acted within the state constitutional provisions while Information Minister Ahmad Shabery Cheek claimed that Nizar's refusal to resign was act of treason.

Zambry was sworn in as the new Menteri Besar of Perak at 4:08 pm that day. The ceremony was attended by members of the Barisan Nasional, including Najib, who arrived in the royal palace, Istana Iskandariah, Kuala Kangsar under heavy security. Supporters of the Pakatan Rakyat amassed in large number outside the palace to protest the swearing in of Zambry. Anwar Ibrahim challenged the legitimacy of Zambry's appointment by stating that Nizar still remains the Menteri Besar, as guaranteed by the state constitutional provisions, while Nizar continued his call for a motion of no confidence to be held in the assembly sitting before he steps down. Nizar called for the resignation of Zambry and stated his desire to file an application at the High Court and declare his appointment as unconstitutional. Nizar and other members of the Pakatan administration returned to the Menteri Besar official residence on 7 February and went ahead with approving three new policies in Perak.

== Litigation ==
DAP chairman and Bukit Gelugor MP Karpal Singh issued a notice that he will file a lawsuit against the sultan and the new Barisan Nasional state government for acting beyond the state Constitution. Since the Election Commission had ruled that there was doubt over the vacancy of the state seats of Changkat Jering and Behrang (held by Osman Jailu and Jamaluddin Mohd Radzi respectively) after the pre-signed letters submitted by Assembly Speaker V. Sivakumar in relation to their resignation were contradicted by denials from both assemblymen, it triggered the provision of Article 33 (1). The provision stated that "if any question arises whether a member of the state Legislative Assembly has become disqualified for membership, the decision of the assembly shall be taken and shall be final". Mohammad Nizar Jamaluddin also filed an application at the High Court to declare the swearing in of Zambry Abdul Kadir as unconstitutional and illegal.

== Assembly below a tree ==
=== Before the sitting ===
According to Nizar's senior exco member Ngeh Koo Ham, the Perak state legal advisor, Ahmad Kamal Mohd Shahid was trying to block state representatives from being notified of an emergency sitting of the state assembly on 3 March. He mentioned that this obstruction was in "contempt of the house" and liable for punishment under house rules.

=== The sitting ===
Because the assemblypersons were barred from entering the building, Sivakumar declared the parking lot of the State Secretariat building as the meeting place. The assembly met under a tree in the parking lot, which would later be known as the Democracy tree. All the three motions were debated and passed unanimously, 27–0.

=== 1BLACKMalaysia protest and arrests ===
The Coalition for Free and Fair Elections (Bersih) urged Malaysians to wear black on 7 May, to protest the "ongoing Perak coup" by the Barisan Nasional government. "It will be a peaceful but powerful message of civil disobedience: that we, the people, are the politicians' bosses and no politician defiant of public opinion can escape punishment at the next poll," said Bersih representative Wong Chin Huat at the launch of the 1BLACKMalaysia campaign on 5 May. That evening, Wong was arrested for sedition for writing several articles, including on the 1BLACKMalaysia campaign. Security was tight around the state secretariat building where the state assembly is housed. The police cordoned off the roads in the areas from the night before the sitting on 7 May. The police warned political party supporters not to create tension by dressing in black and gathering illegally in protest of the Perak state assembly sitting. That didn't stop the supporters from showing up, dressed in black. Even before the sitting began, the police had arrested at dozens of people.

== High Court rules takeover illegal ==
On 11 May 2009, the High Court of Kuala Lumpur ruled that, since there had been no vote of no confidence in the state assembly, the Barisan Nasional takeover was "illegal" and the Pakatan Rakyat's Mohd Nizar Jamaluddin still held office. The opposition is expected to call for fresh elections, while the ruling party has vowed to appeal. The Regent of Perak Raja Nazrin Shah has agreed to see Datuk Seri Nizar Jamaluddin on his request for dissolution of the Perak state legislature and the call for a fresh election.

The night of 11 May, the Pakatan Rakyat Perak executive council met and dismissed the state secretary and state legal adviser. Nizar announced his executive council would report for work the next day, and asserted that the 7 May sitting of the state assembly was invalid because it had been called by Zambry. By implication, this would prevent the Barisan-appointed Speaker from convening a new sitting of the state assembly.

On 12 May, Zambry filed his appeal at the Court of Appeal, which granted him a stay of execution on the court ruling, allowing him to retain the post of Menteri Besar until his appeal is heard.

== Overturning of the High Court verdict ==
The Court of Appeal overturned the High Court decision and held that Zambry the lawful Menteri Besar. The Court of Appeal's verdict was upheld by the Federal Court with a 5-0 verdict in February 2010.

The constitutional crisis came to an indefinite end with Pakatan leaders having no choice but to obey the ruling. As a result, no fresh election was called and Zambry continues as Menteri Besar while Nizar became the opposition leader.

== Comments and interpretations of the constitutional crisis ==
On 2 March 2009, the president of the Malaysian Bar Council, Ambiga Sreenevasan remarked that the Institution of the Perak and its constitution are breaking down. She also mentioned that the secretary of state does not have the power to interfere in the affair of the assembly nor does the police, while the speaker has the very rights within the constitution to exercise his power to call for an emergency sitting of the state assembly. She was also quoted saying "Our institutions, that is the courts, the police, et cetera, are being tested and we can judge for ourselves whether they are acting independently or not".

Tengku Razaleigh Hamzah, an UMNO politician veteran agreed with Pakatan MB to dissolve the state legislative and call for fresh state elections to resolve the political stalemate in Perak.

The Human Rights Commission (Suhakam) has joined the ever increasing chorus calling for fresh state elections to resolve the political stalemate in Perak.

Hardial Singh Khaira, a legal researcher, has done a full research on The Dismissal and Appointment of Menteri Besars in Perak before any judgment was delivered on the Perak constitutional crisis by any Malaysian court and the full article can be viewed online.

== See also ==
- 2020 Malaysian political crisis
- 2025 Perlis political crisis
- 2026 Negeri Sembilan constitutional crisis
