= Jelapang (state constituency) =

Political subdivision in Malaysia

Jelapang (N31)
Perak constituency

State constituency
- Legislature: Perak State Legislative Assembly
MLA
Cheah Pou Hian
PH
- Constituency created: 2003
- First contested: 2004
- Last contested: 2022

Demographics
- Electors (2022): 35,088

Jelapang is a state constituency in Perak, Malaysia, that has been represented in the Perak State Legislative Assembly.

== Demographics ==
Ethnic breakdown of Jelapang's electorate as of 2022
1. Chinese (66.8%)
2. Indian (27.3%)
3. Malay (5.28%)
4. Other ethnicities (0.60%)

== History ==
=== Polling districts ===
According to the gazette issued on 31 October 2022, the Jelapang constituency has a total of 11 polling districts.

| State constituency | Polling districts | Code | Location |
|---|---|---|---|
| Jelapang（N31） | Jelapang Timor | 066/31/01 | Dewan Orang Ramai Jelapang |
| Jelapang（N31） | Jelapang Utara | 066/31/02 | SJK (C) Jelapang |
| Jelapang（N31） | Jelapang Selatan | 066/31/03 | Tadika Jelapang |
| Jelapang（N31） | Jelapang Barat | 066/31/04 | Dewan Orang Ramai Jelapang |
| Jelapang（N31） | Jelapang | 066/31/05 | SJK (C) Jelapang |
| Jelapang（N31） | Silibin | 066/31/06 | SK Silibin |
| Jelapang（N31） | Taman Pertama | 066/31/07 | SJK (C) Yuh Hua |
| Jelapang（N31） | Taman Rishah | 066/31/08 | SJK (C) Yuh Hua |
| Jelapang（N31） | Jelapang Tengah | 066/31/09 | SJK (C) Jelapang |
| Jelapang（N31） | Bukit Kledang | 066/31/10 | SJK (C) Wan Hwa 2 |
| Jelapang（N31） | Papan | 066/31/11 | SJK (C) Papan |

=== Representation history ===
Members of the Perak State Assembly for Jelapang
| Assembly | No | Years | Member | Party |
Constituency created from Lahat and Menglembu
| 11th | N31 | 2004 – 2008 | Hee Yit Foong (许月风) | DAP |
| 12th | N31 | 2008 – 2009 | Hee Yit Foong (许月风) | PR (DAP) |
| 12th | N31 | 2009 - 2013 | Hee Yit Foong (许月风) | Independent |
| 13th | N31 | 2013 – 2018 | Teh Hock Ke (郑福基) | PR (DAP) |
| 14th | N31 | 2018 – 2022 | Cheah Pou Hian (谢保恆) | PH (DAP) |
| 15th | N31 | 2022–present | Cheah Pou Hian (谢保恆) | PH (DAP) |

== Election results ==
Perak state election, 2022
| Party | Candidate | Votes | % | ∆% |
|---|---|---|---|---|
| PH | Cheah Pou Hian | 21,554 | 88.71 | ▲88.71 |
| BN | Hamidah Muhamad | 1,443 | 5.94 | ▼2.99 |
| PN | Navinten Sundarajan | 1,299 | 5.35 | ▲5.35 |
| Total valid votes | | 24,296 | 100.00 | |
| Total rejected ballots | | 214 | | |
| Unreturned ballots | | 80 | | |
| Turnout | | 24,590 | 70.08 | ▼10.43 |
| Registered electors | | 35,088 | | |
| Majority | | 20,111 | 82.77 | ▲5.43 |
| PH hold | | Swing | | |

Perak state election, 2018
| Party | Candidate | Votes | % | ∆% |
|---|---|---|---|---|
| PKR | Cheah Pou Hian | 16,940 | 86.27 | ▲86.27 |
| BN | Thankaraj Krishnan | 1,753 | 8.93 | ▼10.35 |
| Parti Sosialis Malaysia | Sarasyathy Muthu | 944 | 4.81 | ▼5.83 |
| Total valid votes | | 19,637 | 98.63 | |
| Total rejected ballots | | 206 | 1.03 | |
| Unreturned ballots | | 67 | 0.34 | |
| Turnout | | 19,910 | 80.51 | ▼1.59 |
| Registered electors | | 24,729 | | |
| Majority | | 15,187 | 77.34 | ▲26.54 |
| PKR hold | | Swing | | |
Source(s) "RESULTS OF CONTESTED ELECTION AND STATEMENTS OF THE POLL AFTER THE OFFICIAL ADDITION OF VOTES". Archived from the original on 2023-04-28.

Perak state election, 2013
| Party | Candidate | Votes | % | ∆% |
|---|---|---|---|---|
| DAP | Teh Hock Ke | 16,921 | 70.08 | ▲5.79 |
| BN | Mokan Supramaniam | 4,655 | 19.28 | ▼9.75 |
| Parti Sosialis Malaysia | Sarasyathy Muthu | 2,568 | 10.64 | ▲10.64 |
| Total valid votes | | 24,144 | 97.87 | |
| Total rejected ballots | | 431 | 1.75 | |
| Unreturned ballots | | 95 | 0.39 | |
| Turnout | | 24,670 | 82.10 | ▲7.90 |
| Registered electors | | 30,032 | | |
| Majority | | 12,266 | 50.80 | ▲15.51 |
| DAP hold | | Swing | | |
Source(s) "KEPUTUSAN PILIHAN RAYA UMUM DEWAN UNDANGAN NEGERI". Archived from the original on 2016-10-23.

Perak state election, 2008
| Party | Candidate | Votes | % | ∆% |
|---|---|---|---|---|
| DAP | Hee Yit Foong | 12,219 | 64.29 | ▲14.61 |
| BN | Loh Koi Pin | 5,512 | 29.00 | ▼19.16 |
| Independent | Sarasyathy Muthu | 1,275 | 6.71 | ▲6.71 |
| Total valid votes | | 19,006 | 97.92 | |
| Total rejected ballots | | 402 | 2.07 | |
| Unreturned ballots | | 1 | 0.01 | |
| Turnout | | 19,409 | 74.20 | ▲3.81 |
| Registered electors | | 26,157 | | |
| Majority | | 6,707 | 35.29 | ▲33.77 |
| DAP hold | | Swing | | |
Source(s) "KEPUTUSAN PILIHAN RAYA UMUM DEWAN UNDANGAN NEGERI PERAK BAGI TAHUN 2008".

Perak state election, 2004
| Party | Candidate | Votes | % |
|---|---|---|---|
| DAP | Hee Yit Foong | 8,231 | 49.68 |
| BN | Mah Hang Soon | 7,978 | 48.16 |
| PKR | Foo Tiew Kok | 358 | 2.16 |
| Total valid votes | | 16,567 | 97.91 |
| Total rejected ballots | | 306 | 1.81 |
| Unreturned ballots | | 48 | 0.28 |
| Turnout | | 16,921 | 70.39 |
| Registered electors | | 24,039 | |
| Majority | | 253 | 1.52 |
This was a new constituency created.
Source(s) "KEPUTUSAN PILIHAN RAYA UMUM DEWAN UNDANGAN NEGERI PERAK BAGI TAHUN 2004".
