= Muhamad Arafat Varisai Mahamad =

Malaysian ex politician

Yang Berhormat Tuan Muhamad Arafat Varisai Mahamad MLA

Member of the Perak State Legislative Assembly for Hulu Kinta
- Incumbent
- Assumed office 9 May 2018
- Preceded by: Aminuddin Md Hanafiah (BN–UMNO)
- Majority: 3,713 (2018); 4,163 (2022)

Personal details
- Born: Muhamad Arafat bin Varisai Mahamad
- Party: People's Justice Party (PKR)
- Other political affiliations: Pakatan Harapan (PH)
- Occupation: Politician

Muhamad Arafat bin Varisai Mahamad is a Malaysian politician who has served as Member of the Perak State Legislative Assembly (MLA) for Hulu Kinta since May 2018. He is a member, the State Spokesperson of Perak and the Division Chief of Tambun of the People's Justice Party (PKR), a component party of the Pakatan Harapan (PH) coalition.

== Election results ==
Perak State Legislative Assembly
Year	Constituency	Candidate	Votes	Pct	Opponent(s)	Votes	Pct	Ballots cast	Majority	Turnout
2018	N24 Hulu Kinta	Muhamad Arafat Varisai Mahamad (PKR)	17,766	43.70%	Aminuddin Md Hanafiah (UMNO)	14,053	34.56%	40,659	3,713	81.39%
2018	N24 Hulu Kinta	Muhamad Arafat Varisai Mahamad (PKR)	17,766	43.70%	Mat Salleh Said (PAS)	7,425	18.26%	40,659	3,713	81.39%
2018	N24 Hulu Kinta	Muhamad Arafat Varisai Mahamad (PKR)	17,766	43.70%	Murugiah Subramaniam (IND)	217	0.53%	40,659	3,713	81.39%
2022	N24 Hulu Kinta	Muhamad Arafat Varisai Mahamad (PKR)	22,220	39.02%	Puteri Holijah Muhamad Rali (BERSATU)	18,057	31.71%	57,923	4,163	77.97%
2022	N24 Hulu Kinta	Muhamad Arafat Varisai Mahamad (PKR)	22,220	39.02%	Mazlan Abd Rahman (UMNO)	16,224	28.49%	57,923	4,163	77.97%
2022	N24 Hulu Kinta	Muhamad Arafat Varisai Mahamad (PKR)	22,220	39.02%	Murugiah Subramaniam (IND)	437	0.77%	57,923	4,163	77.97%
