= Amani Williams Hunt Abdullah =

Malaysian social activist/politician

- Born: 21 May 1953 (age 72); Tapah, Perak, Federation of Malaya (now Malaysia)
- Other names: Bah Tony
- Education: B.Econs University of Malaya B.Jurisprudence, CLP University of Malaya
- Occupations: Social activist, land rights campaigner, politician and lawyer
- Employer(s): Kamal Phang Advocates & Solicitors Ipoh, Perak
- Known for: Promoting and advocating Orang Asli social justice, rights, and opportunity (President of Peninsular Malaysia Orang Asli Association from 1987 to 1991. Member of the National Advisory Council for the Development of the Orang Asli Community)
- Spouse: Khatimatul Husna Zainuddin
- Children: 6
- Parent(s): Peter Darell Rider Williams-Hunt (Advisor to the Aborigines in Malaysia); Wah Draman

Amani Williams-Hunt bin Abdullah, (born 21 May 1953 in Tapah, Perak, Malaysia) is an indigenous Malaysian social activist, and politician who campaigned for most of his life seeking greater social justice, land rights, and improved life opportunities for Aboriginal Malaysians in Peninsular Malaysia. He is fondly known as Bah Tony amongst the Orang Asli communities throughout the country, is very active in Orang Asli advocacy and was President of Persatuan Orang Asli Semenanjung Malaysia from 1987 to 1991.

He is the first Orang Asli male to be admitted into the legal fraternity. He was called to the Bar in front of High Court judge Datuk Zainal Adzam Abd Ghani in Ipoh on 22 October 2010.

== Biographical details ==
Born Anthony Williams-Hunt, he is the only son of Peter Darell Rider Williams-Hunt, the advisor to the aborigines in Malaysia shortly after World War II, and Wah Draman, an Orang Asli woman of Semai tribe from Kuala Woh located at the foot of the Cameron Highlands. His father, Peter Darell Rider Williams-Hunt died in an accident at an orang asli village in the jungle when he was barely one year old.

Peter Williams-Hunt had made a journey to Tapah for the wedding of his sister-in-law. On the return trek to Wah Draman's village, the wooden bridge he was crossing collapsed, and in his fall Peter Williams-Hunt's chest was pierced by one of the wooden supports. He died eight days later in Batu Gajah Hospital on 11 June 1953.

=== Peter Williams-Hunt ===
Peter Williams-Hunt passing was noted internationally and his local fame as Tuan Janggot (Mr. Beard) prompted a large and well attended traditional Semai funeral. Their child, Tony Williams- Hunt, known locally as Bah Tony was born only three weeks before his father's untimely demise.

Williams-Hunt during his period, wrote several seminal articles on the Orang Asli in Malaya. He was also a trained aerial photographic interpreter and collected more than 5000 aerial photographs of Malaysia, Singapore, Myanmar, Thailand, Cambodia and miscellaneous areas of Vietnam during his postings to Southeast Asia.

=== Early life, family and education ===
Amani Williams was taken care of by his mother and an uncle. He received his primary school education at National Type Primary English School at Tapah, Perak. He completed his secondary schooling at Government English School at Tapah also.

By 1979, Amani Williams had graduated from University of Malaya Kuala Lumpur majoring in economics, where he was one of the first Aboriginal Malaysians to gain tertiary education. He joined the then Bank Bumiputra in Kuala Lumpur as a banker.

He began studying law part-time since 1999 saying that "becoming a lawyer enabled him to seek justice and help for his community". After 26 years, he resigned his position in 2006 to do his Certificate in Legal Practice.

Amani is married to Khatimatul Husna Zainuddin, 38, and they have six children. He believes that law is the cement of society. Much of Amani's life has been devoted to the cause of the Orang Asli, thus fulfilling in many ways the hopes and aims of his father.

== Lawyer career and community service ==
Popularly known as Bah Tony to the Orang Asli, he is a former president of the Peninsula Malaysia Orang Asli Association. He is active in welfare and social work and is a founder member of the orang asli foundation, YOAP Berhad.

He is now a council member of the Orang Asli Development Advisory Council, a think-tank set up by the Rural and Regional Development Ministry, and also sits on the Orang Asli Rights Committee in the Malaysian Bar Council. Amani Williams and his colleague Augustine Anthony, had actively helped to acquit four Orang Asli men charged with killing a tiger on 27 October 2012. Yok Rayau Yok Senian (50), Yok Kalong Bah Rapee (51), Yok Mat Bah Chong (48) and Hassan Bah Ong (33), all from the Semai tribe of an Orang Asli settlement near Sungkai were jointly charged under the 1972 Wild Life (Protection) Act for killing with a shotgun a tiger, which is a protected and listed species under the act.

It was reported in the media that the four and another friend, Yok Meneh Yok Din, 47, had gone to the Bukit Tapah forest reserve to collect jungle produce when a tiger attacked Yok Meneh. One of the four then shot the tiger dead to save their friend from being attacked. Eight prosecution witnesses testified in the trial.

The four orang asli men, were acquitted and discharged by the magistrate's court in Tapah. Magistrate Fairuz Adiba Ismail made the decision after the prosecution failed to prove a prima facie case against the four accused. There were shouts of joy outside the courtroom when news filtered in about the acquittal. Some 30 orang asli people, dressed in their traditional attire, had gathered at the court building to provide moral support.

In celebratory mood, the Orang Asli held a thanksgiving to celebrate the acquittal at Kampong Chang Sungai Gepai, Bidor. The two lawyers who fought their case pro bono, Augustine Anthony and Amani Williams were guests of honour.

== Political arena ==
Amani Williams Hunt Abdullah, joined Democratic Action Party (DAP) in June 2011 to seek a platform to highlight Orang Asli concerns and help his community to put their plight on the national agenda. Eighteen months after joining DAP, the activist was said to become disillusioned after learning that he could not help his community through the party.

He left the party, dealing a serious blow and raising a question mark over its multi-racial stance and commitment to help the indigenous people. Amani's resignation was reportedly due to being disillusioned with the factional politics and dynastic domination in Perak, as well as the warlords allied to the family. He was not into the Perak factional politics.

In 2013, Amani Williams became the first Malaysian Aborigines to stand Malaysia's General Election; the first time in the history of the Peninsular Malaysia. He had contested the Malaysia's 13th election on the ticket of People's Justice Party (PKR) of Pakatan Rakyat (PR) but lost to Mah Hang Soon the incumbent from Malaysian Chinese Association (MCA) of Barisan Nasional (BN) coalition.

== Election results ==
Perak State Legislative Assembly
Year	Constituency	Candidate	Votes	Pct	Opponent(s)	Votes	Pct	Ballots cast	Majority	Turnout
2013	N46 Chenderiang	Amani Williams Hunt Abdullah (PKR)	6,099	35.95%	Mah Hang Soon (MCA)	10,866	64.05%	17,542	4,767	80.70%
