= Jamaluddin Mohd Radzi =

Malaysian politician

- جمال الدين محمد رضي

Member of the Perak State Legislative Assembly for Behrang
- In office 2008–2013
- Preceded by: R. Apalanaidu
- Succeeded by: Rusnah Kassim

Personal details
- Born: 1950s
- Party: PKR (till 2009)
- Occupation: Politician

Jamaluddin bin Mohd Radzi is a Malaysian politician. He was the state assemblyman for Behrang. In early 2009, along with Mohd Osman Mohd Jailu and Hee Yit Foong, he resigned from the People's Justice Party (PKR) to sit as an independent, supporting the fall of the Mohammad Nizar Jamaluddin-led government and precipitating the 2009 Perak Constitutional crisis.

== Early career ==
Jamaluddin was a postman and was in the business sector before joining politics.

== Political career ==
He contested the Behrang seat twice. In the 2004 Malaysian general election, he lost to the MIC candidate, Appalannaldu Rajoo. In the 2008 Malaysian general election, he won against the MIC candidate, Ramasamy Muthusamy. He was a candidate to be Menteri Besar of Perak following the election, but Mohammad Nizar Jamaluddin from PAS was chosen.

=== 2009 Perak constitutional crisis ===
During the 2009 Perak Constitutional Crisis, Jamaluddin, together with Mohd Osman Mohd Jailu and Hee Yit Foong, declared themselves independent state assemblymen and supported Barisan Nasional to establish a new state government. In the 2013 Perak state election, although Jamaluddin considered defending his Behrang seat as an independent, he decided not to contest and lend his support to Barisan Nasional candidate Rusnah Kassim.

=== Attempt to join BERSATU ===
On 15 May 2018, the by-then Menteri Besar of Perak, Ahmad Faizal Azumu, stated in a press conference that Jamaluddin's application to join BERSATU had been rejected as he had taken part in the 2009 Perak constitutional crisis. Jamaluddin had applied to join BERSATU together with the Sungai Manik state assemblyman, Zainol Fadzi Paharudin.

=== As an independent candidate ===
After years of not contesting any election, Jamaluddin attempted to make a comeback by contesting in the 2022 Malaysian general election at the Tanjong Malim federal seat as an independent. He, however, failed to make a major impression on the election, only garnering 1,032 votes and losing his deposit.

== Election results ==
Perak State Legislative Assembly
| Year | Constituency | Candidate | Votes | Pct | Opponent(s) | Votes | Pct | Ballots cast | Majority | Turnout |
|---|---|---|---|---|---|---|---|---|---|---|
| 2004 | N59 Behrang | Jamaluddin Mohd Radzi (PKR) | 3,879 | 32.54% | Appalannaidu Rajoo (MIC) | 7,627 | 63.99% | 11,919 | 3,748 | 64.54% |
| 2008 | N59 Behrang | Jamaluddin Mohd Radzi (PKR) | 6,771 | 51.82% | Ramasamy Muthusamy (MIC) | 5,744 | 43.96% | 13,067 | 1,027 | 70.43% |

Parliament of Malaysia
| Year | Constituency | Candidate | Votes | Pct | Opponent | Votes | Pct | Ballots cast | Majority | Turnout |
|---|---|---|---|---|---|---|---|---|---|---|
| 2022 | P077 Tanjong Malim | Jamaluddin Mohd Radzi (IND) | 1,032 | 1.48% | Chang Lih Kang (PKR) | 25,140 | 36.08% | 69,671 | 3,541 | 74.22% |
| 2022 | P077 Tanjong Malim | Jamaluddin Mohd Radzi (IND) | 1,032 | 1.48% | Nolee Ashilin Mohammed Radzi (BERSATU) | 21,599 | 31.00% | 69,671 | 3,541 | 74.22% |
| 2022 | P077 Tanjong Malim | Jamaluddin Mohd Radzi (IND) | 1,032 | 1.48% | Mah Hang Soon (MCA) | 20,963 | 30.09% | 69,671 | 3,541 | 74.22% |
| 2022 | P077 Tanjong Malim | Jamaluddin Mohd Radzi (IND) | 1,032 | 1.48% | Amir Hamzah Abdul Rajak (IMAN) | 609 | 0.87% | 69,671 | 3,541 | 74.22% |
| 2022 | P077 Tanjong Malim | Jamaluddin Mohd Radzi (IND) | 1,032 | 1.48% | Izzat Johari (IND) | 328 | 0.47% | 69,671 | 3,541 | 74.22% |

== Controversies ==
=== Corruption ===
On 6 February 2013, all 3 judges in the Court of Appeal, chaired by President of Court of Appeal Tan Sri Mohamed Raus Sharif, unanimously acquitted him of corruption charges.

== See also ==
- Behrang (state constituency)
- 2009 Perak constitutional crisis
