= Salina Samsudin =

Malaysian politician

Yang Berhormat Puan Salina Samsudin PMP AMP PJK MLA

Member of the Perak State Legislative Assembly for Behrang
- Incumbent
- Assumed office 19 November 2022
- Preceded by: Aminuddin Zulkipli (PH–AMANAH)
- Majority: 202 (2022)

Personal details
- Party: United Malays National Organisation (UMNO)
- Other political affiliations: Barisan Nasional (BN)
- Occupation: Politician

Salina binti Samsudin is a Malaysian politician. She served as Member of Perak State Legislative Assembly (MLA) for Behrang since November 2022. She is a member of United Malays National Organisation (UMNO), a component party of Barisan Nasional (BN).

== Election results ==
Perak State Legislative Assembly
Year	Constituency	Candidate	Votes	Pct	Opponent(s)	Votes	Pct	Ballots cast	Majority	Turnout
2022	N59 Behrang	Salina Samsudin (UMNO)	10,337	34.42%	Khairol Najib Hashim (AMANAH)	10,135	33.75%	30,660	202	76.56%
2022	N59 Behrang	Salina Samsudin (UMNO)	10,337	34.42%	Mohd Amran Ibrahim (BERSATU)	9,240	30.77%	30,660	202	76.56%
2022	N59 Behrang	Salina Samsudin (UMNO)	10,337	34.42%	Hazvee Hafiz (PUTRA)	317	1.06%	30,660	202	76.56%

== Honours ==
- Perak
  - Commander of the Order of the Perak State Crown (PMP) (2025)
  - Member of the Order of the Perak State Crown (AMP) (2014)
  - Recipient of the Meritorious Service Medal (PJK) (2006)
