= Mohd Zaidi Aziz =

Malaysian politician

- محمد زايدي عزيز

Member of the Perak State Legislative Assembly for Slim
- In office 29 August 2020 – 19 November 2022
- Preceded by: Mohd Khusairi Abdul Talib (BN–UMNO)
- Succeeded by: Muhammad Zulfadli Zainal (PN–PAS)
- Majority: 10,945 (2020)

Personal details
- Born: Mohd Zaidi bin Aziz; 24 September 1977 (age 49) Slim River, Perak, Malaysia
- Citizenship: Malaysian
- Party: United Malays National Organisation (UMNO)
- Other political affiliations: Barisan Nasional (BN)
- Spouse: Juliana Sarip
- Children: Aliya Saajidah; Zaim Najhan; Hasan Khalil; Maryam Tihani
- Education: International Islamic University Malaysia
- Occupation: Politician

Mohd Zaidi Aziz (born 24 September 1977) is a Malaysian politician who served as Member of the Perak State Legislative Assembly (MLA) for Slim from August 2020 to November 2022. He is a member of the United Malays National Organisation (UMNO), a component party of the Barisan Nasional (BN) coalition.

== Political career ==
=== Member of the Perak State Legislative Assembly (2020–2022) ===
==== 2020 Slim by-election ====
Following the death of former Slim MLA Mohd Khusairi Abdul Talib, Zaidi was nominated by BN to contest for Slim in the 2020 Slim by-election. He won the seat and was elected to the Perak Assembly as the Slim MLA after defeating independent candidate Amir Khusyairi Mohd Tanusi of the Homeland Fighters Party (PEJUANG) and another independent candidate Santharasekaran Subramaniam by the majority of 10,945 votes.

==== 2022 Perak state election ====
In the 2022 Perak state election, Mohd Zaidy was renominated by BN to defend the Slim seat. He was not reelected to the Perak Assembly as the Slim MLA for the second term after narrowly losing the seat to Muhammad Zulfadli Zainal of Perikatan Nasional (PN) by a minority of only 416 votes.

== Personal life ==
He was educated at the International Islamic University Malaysia (IIUM), married to Juliana Sarip and has 4 children with her.

== Election results ==
Perak State Legislative Assembly
Year	Constituency	Candidate	Votes	Pct	Opponent(s)	Votes	Pct	Ballots cast	Majority	Turnout
2020	N58 Slim	Mohd Zaidi Aziz (UMNO)	13,060	84.53%	Amir Khusyairi Mohd Tanusi (IND)	2,115	13.69%	15,778	10,945	68.40%
2020	N58 Slim	Mohd Zaidi Aziz (UMNO)	13,060	84.53%	Santharasekaran Subramaniam (IND)	276	1.78%	15,778	10,945	68.40%
2022	N58 Slim	Mohd Zaidi Aziz (UMNO)	8,737	37.11%	Muhammad Zulfadli Zainal (PAS)	9,153	38.87%	23,546	416	77.00%
2022	N58 Slim	Mohd Zaidi Aziz (UMNO)	8,737	37.11%	Mohd Syahid Mohd Zaini (PKR)	5,455	23.17%	23,546	416	77.00%
2022	N58 Slim	Mohd Zaidi Aziz (UMNO)	8,737	37.11%	Meor Muhammad Azim Meor Aznam (PEJUANG)	201	0.85%	23,546	416	77.00%
