= Cheah Pou Hian =

Malaysian politician

Yang Berhormat Tuan Cheah Pou Hian MLA
- 谢保恒

Member of the Perak State Legislative Assembly for Jelapang
- Incumbent
- Assumed office 9 May 2018
- Preceded by: Teh Hock Ke (PR–DAP)
- Majority: 15,187 (2018); 20,111 (2022)

Personal details
- Born: Cheah Pou Hian; 1 January 1970 (age 56) Malaysia
- Citizenship: Malaysian
- Party: Democratic Action Party (DAP)
- Other political affiliations: Pakatan Harapan (PH)
- Education: City and Guilds of London Institute
- Occupation: Politician

Cheah Pou Hian

Chinese name
- Traditional Chinese: 謝保恆
- Simplified Chinese: 谢保恒
Transcriptions
Standard Mandarin
- Hanyu Pinyin: Xiè Bǎohéng

Cheah Pou Hian (simplified Chinese: 谢保恒; traditional Chinese: 謝保恆; pinyin: Xiè Bǎohéng; born 1 January 1970) is a Malaysian politician who has served as Member of the Perak State Legislative Assembly (MLA) for Jelapang since May 2018. He is a member of the Democratic Action Party (DAP), a component party of the Pakatan Harapan (PH) coalition. He has a Diploma in Electronic Engineering in Linton University College and Electrical Engineering studies in City and Guilds of London Institute.

== Election results ==
Perak State Legislative Assembly
Year	Constituency	Candidate	Votes	Pct	Opponent(s)	Votes	Pct	Ballots cast	Majority	Turnout
2018	N31 Jelapang	Cheah Pou Hian (DAP)	16,940	85.08%	Thankaraj Krishnan (MIC)	1,753	8.80%	19,910	15,187	80.51%
2018	N31 Jelapang	Cheah Pou Hian (DAP)	16,940	85.08%	Sarasyathy Muthu (PSM)	944	4.74%	19,910	15,187	80.51%
2022	N31 Jelapang	Cheah Pou Hian (DAP)	21,554	88.71%	Hamidah Muhamad (MMSP)	1,443	5.94%	24,590	20,111	70.08%
2022	N31 Jelapang	Cheah Pou Hian (DAP)	21,554	88.71%	Navinten Sundarajan (PAS)	1,299	5.35%	24,590	20,111	70.08%
