= Slim (state constituency) =

Political subdivision in Malaysia

Slim (N58)
Perak constituency

State constituency
- Legislature: Perak State Legislative Assembly
MLA
Muhammad Zulfadli Zainal
PN
- Constituency created: 1959
- First contested: 1959
- Last contested: 2022

Demographics
- Electors (2022): 30,581

Slim is a state constituency in Perak, Malaysia, that has been represented in the Perak State Legislative Assembly.

== Demographics ==
Ethnic breakdown of Slim's electorate as of 2022
1. Malay (74.4%)
2. Indian (12.9%)
3. Chinese (10.0%)
4. Other ethnicities (2.60%)

== History ==
=== Polling districts ===
According to the federal gazette issued on 31 October 2022, the Slim constituency is divided into 13 polling districts.

State constituency	Polling districts	Code	Location
Slim (N58)	Ladang Sungkai	077/58/01	SJK (T) Ladang Sungkai
Slim (N58)	Pekan Lama	077/58/02	SK Changkat Sulaiman
Slim (N58)	Changkat Sulaiman	077/58/03	SK Changkat Sulaiman
Slim (N58)	Trolak Utara	077/58/04	SK Trolak Utara
Slim (N58)	Trolak Selatan	077/58/05	SK Trolak Selatan
Slim (N58)	Trolak	077/58/06	SJK (T) Trolak
Slim (N58)	Pekan Slim	077/58/07	SK Slim River
Slim (N58)	Sungai Slim Utara	077/58/08	SK Aminuddin Bakri
Slim (N58)	Kampong Kuala Slim	077/58/09	SK Kuala Slim
Slim (N58)	Ladang Kepala Bali	077/58/10	SJK (T) Ldg Kelapa Bali
Slim (N58)	FELDA Gunong Besout I	077/58/11	SK Besout 3; SMK (FELDA) Besout
Slim (N58)	FELDA Gunong Besout II	077/58/12	SK Seri Besout
Slim (N58)	FELDA Gunong Besout V	077/58/13	SK Besout 5; SK Besout 4

=== Representation history ===
Members of the Legislative Assembly for Slim
Assembly	No	Years	Name	Party
Constituency created
1st	N34	1959-1964	Yang Abdul Rashid Abdul Wahab	Alliance (UMNO)
2nd	N34	1964-1969	Zakaria A. Manaf	Alliance (UMNO)
		1969-1971	Assembly dissolved	
3rd	N34	1969-1971	R. M. Idris	Alliance (UMNO)
3rd	N34	1971-1974	R. M. Idris	BN (UMNO)
4th	N34	1974-1978	R. M. Idris	BN (UMNO)
5th	N40	1978-1982	R. M. Idris	BN (UMNO)
6th	N40	1982-1986	Dzulkarnain Abdul Rahman	BN (UMNO)
7th	N46	1986-1990	Junus Wahid	BN (UMNO)
8th	N46	1990-1995	Junus Wahid	BN (UMNO)
9th	N52	1995-1999	Junus Wahid	BN (UMNO)
10th	N52	1999-2004	Junus Wahid	BN (UMNO)
11th	N58	2004-2008	Mohd. Khusairi Abdul Talib	BN (UMNO)
12th	N58	2008-2013	Mohd. Khusairi Abdul Talib	BN (UMNO)
13th	N58	2013-2018	Mohd. Khusairi Abdul Talib	BN (UMNO)
14th	N58	2018-2020	Mohd. Khusairi Abdul Talib	BN (UMNO)
14th	N58	2020-2022	Mohd Zaidi Aziz	BN (UMNO)
15th	N58	2022–present	Muhammad Zulfadli Zainal	PN (PAS)

== Election results ==
Perak state election, 2022
Party	Candidate	Votes	%	∆%
PN	Muhammad Zulfadli Zainal	9,153	38.87	▲38.87
BN	Mohd Zaidi Aziz	8,737	37.11	▼47.42
PH	Mohd Syahid Mohd Zaini	5,455	23.17	▲23.17
PEJUANG	Meor Azim	201	0.85	▲0.85
Total valid votes		23,546	100.00	
Total rejected ballots		272		
Unreturned ballots		43		
Turnout		23,861	78.03	▲9.63
Registered electors		30,581		
Majority		416	1.76	▼69.08
PN gain from BN		Swing		?

Perak state by-election, 29 August 2020 Upon the death of the incumbent, Mohd. Khusairi Abdul Talib
Party	Candidate	Votes	%	∆%
BN	Mohd Zaidi Aziz	13,060	84.53	▲39.70
Independent	Amir Khusyairi Mohd Tanusi	2,115	13.69	▲13.69
Independent	Santharasekaran Subramaniam	276	1.79	▲1.79
Total valid votes		15,451	97.82	
Total rejected ballots		327	2.07	
Unreturned ballots		18	0.11	
Turnout		15,796	68.40	▼13.13
Registered electors		23,094		
Majority		10,945	70.84	▲59.09
BN hold		Swing		
"RESULTS OF CONTESTED ELECTION AND STATEMENTS OF THE POLL AFTER THE OFFICIAL ADDITION OF VOTES" (PDF).

Perak state election, 2018
Party	Candidate	Votes	%	∆%
BN	Mohd. Khusairi Abdul Talib	8,327	44.83	▼14.96
PKR	Mohd Amran Ibrahim	6,144	33.08	▲33.08
PAS	Muhammad Zulfadli Zainal	4,103	22.09	▼16.67
Total valid votes		18,574	97.45	
Total rejected ballots		350	1.84	
Unreturned ballots		136	0.71	
Turnout		19,060	81.53	▼3.67
Registered electors		23,377		
Majority		2,183	11.75	▼9.28
BN hold		Swing		
Source(s) "RESULTS OF CONTESTED ELECTION AND STATEMENTS OF THE POLL AFTER THE OFFICIAL ADDITION OF VOTES".

Perak state election, 2013
Party	Candidate	Votes	%	∆%
BN	Mohd. Khusairi Abdul Talib	11,152	59.79	▼3.83
PAS	Aminuddin Zulkipli	7,299	38.76	▲1.28
Independent	Mosses Ramiah	200	1.07	▲1.07
Total valid votes		18,651	98.08	
Total rejected ballots		303	1.59	
Unreturned ballots		62	0.33	
Turnout		19,016	85.20	▲9.68
Registered electors		22,320		
Majority		3,853	21.03	▼6.21
BN hold		Swing		
Source(s) "KEPUTUSAN PILIHAN RAYA UMUM DEWAN UNDANGAN NEGERI".

Perak state election, 2008
Party	Candidate	Votes	%	∆%
BN	Mohd. Khusairi Abdul Talib	8,233	63.62	▼7.11
PAS	Zulqarnain Hassan	4,707	36.38	▲7.11
Total valid votes		12,940	97.14	
Total rejected ballots		335	2.51	
Unreturned ballots		46	0.35	
Turnout		13,321	75.52	▲3.25
Registered electors		23,377		
Majority		3,526	27.24	▼14.22
BN hold		Swing		
Source(s) "KEPUTUSAN PILIHAN RAYA UMUM DEWAN UNDANGAN NEGERI PERAK BAGI TAHUN 2008".

Perak state election, 2004
Party	Candidate	Votes	%	∆%
BN	Mohd. Khusairi Abdul Talib	8,318	70.73	▲5.86
PAS	Tarmizi Abdul Rahman	3,443	29.27	▼5.86
Total valid votes		11,761	97.69	
Total rejected ballots		244	2.03	
Unreturned ballots		34	0.28	
Turnout		12,039	72.27	▲6.74
Registered electors		16,658		
Majority		4,875	41.46	▲11.72
BN hold		Swing		
Source(s) "KEPUTUSAN PILIHAN RAYA UMUM DEWAN UNDANGAN NEGERI PERAK BAGI TAHUN 2004".

Perak state election, 1999
Party	Candidate	Votes	%	∆%
BN	Junus Wahid	13,348	64.87	▼19.02
PAS	Tarmizi Abdul Rahman	7,227	35.13	▲35.13
Total valid votes		20,575	96.62	
Total rejected ballots		705	3.31	
Unreturned ballots		14	0.07	
Turnout		21,294	65.53	▼1.64
Registered electors		32,495		
Majority		6,121	29.74	▼38.04
BN hold		Swing		
Source(s) "KEPUTUSAN PILIHAN RAYA UMUM DEWAN UNDANGAN NEGERI PERAK BAGI TAHUN 1999".

Perak state election, 1995
Party	Candidate	Votes	%	∆%
BN	Junus Wahid	16,695	83.89	▲9.42
S46	Desa Saad	3,207	16.11	▼9.42
Total valid votes		19,902	96.12	
Total rejected ballots		666	3.22	
Unreturned ballots		136	0.66	
Turnout		20,704	67.17	▼4.70
Registered electors		30,821		
Majority		13,488	67.78	▲18.84
BN hold		Swing		
Source(s) "KEPUTUSAN PILIHAN RAYA UMUM DEWAN UNDANGAN NEGERI PERAK BAGI TAHUN 1995".

Perak state election, 1990
Party	Candidate	Votes	%	∆%
BN	Junus Wahid	14,883	74.47	▲5.76
S46	Auzir Mohd Yaacob	5,102	25.53	▲25.53
Total valid votes		19,985	96.35	
Total rejected ballots		758	3.65	
Unreturned ballots		0	0.00	
Turnout		20,743	71.87	▲3.19
Registered electors		28,861		
Majority		9,781	48.94	▲1.20
BN hold		Swing		
Source(s) "KEPUTUSAN PILIHAN RAYA UMUM DEWAN UNDANGAN NEGERI PERAK BAGI TAHUN 1990".

Perak state election, 1986
Party	Candidate	Votes	%	∆%
BN	Junus Wahid	11,380	68.71	▼4.10
DAP	Neng Lan Song	3,473	20.97	▼6.21
PAS	Adam Zainal Abidin	1,709	10.32	▲10.32
Total valid votes		16,562	100.00	
Total rejected ballots		405		
Unreturned ballots		0		
Turnout		16,967	68.68	▼2.39
Registered electors		24,705		
Majority		7,907	47.74	▲2.11
BN hold		Swing		
Source(s) "KEPUTUSAN PILIHAN RAYA UMUM DEWAN UNDANGAN NEGERI PERAK BAGI TAHUN 1986".

Perak state election, 1982
Party	Candidate	Votes	%	∆%
BN	Zol Karnaini Abdul Rahman	9,359	72.82	▲2.36
DAP	Rajan NaiduRajan	3,494	27.18	▲2.08
Total valid votes		12,853	100.00	
Total rejected ballots		478		
Unreturned ballots		0		
Turnout		13,331	71.06	▼0.64
Registered electors		18,759		
Majority		5,865	45.63	▲0.28
BN hold		Swing		

Perak state election, 1978
Party	Candidate	Votes	%	∆%
BN	Idris Abdul Rauf	7,707	70.45	▲1.25
DAP	Abdul Raffor Abdul Hamid	2,746	25.10	▼2.10
PAS	Ibrahim Sadri	486	4.44	▲4.44
Total valid votes		10,939	100.00	
Total rejected ballots		356		
Unreturned ballots		0		
Turnout		11,295	71.70	▼1.44
Registered electors		15,753		
Majority		4,961	45.35	▲3.34
BN hold		Swing		

Perak state election, 1974
Party	Candidate	Votes	%	∆%
BN	Idris Abdul Rauf	6,453	69.21	▲69.21
DAP	Abu Samah Majid	2,536	27.20	▼11.35
PEKEMAS	Mohd. Yusof Lebai Tiab	335	3.59	▲3.59
Total valid votes		9,324	100.00	
Total rejected ballots		450		
Unreturned ballots		0		
Turnout		9,774	73.14	▲8.46
Registered electors		13,363		
Majority		3,917	42.01	▲26.71
BN hold		Swing		-

Perak state election, 1969
Party	Candidate	Votes	%	∆%
Alliance	Idris Abdul Rauf	4,561	53.85	▼14.14
DAP	Wong Ka Sing	3,265	38.55	▲38.55
PMIP	Baharin Mohd Noor	644	7.60	▲7.60
Total valid votes		8,470	100.00	
Total rejected ballots		577		
Unreturned ballots		0		
Turnout		9,047	64.68	▼11.05
Registered electors		13,987		
Majority		1,296	15.30	▼23.66
Alliance hold		Swing		

Perak state election, 1964
Party	Candidate	Votes	%	∆%
Alliance	Zakaria Maraf	5,328	67.99	▲4.32
Socialist Front	Cheah Wai Cheong	2,275	29.03	▲29.03
PPP	Kok Yin Chye	234	2.99	▼9.68
Total valid votes		7,837	100.00	
Total rejected ballots		450		
Unreturned ballots		0		
Turnout		8,287	75.73	▲11.53
Registered electors		10,943		
Majority		3,053	38.96	▼8.45
Alliance hold		Swing		

Perak state election, 1959
Party	Candidate	Votes	%
Alliance	Yang Abdul Rashid Abd. Wahab	3,927	63.67
Socialist Front	Jaffar Alang	1,003	16.26
PPP	Mohamed Suhaily Ahmad	781	12.66
PMIP	Abdullah Abu Seman	457	7.41
Total valid votes		6,168	100.00
Total rejected ballots		278	
Unreturned ballots		0	
Turnout		6,446	64.20
Registered electors		10,041	
Majority		2,924	47.41
This was a new constituency created.
