= Steven Tiw Tee Siang =

Malaysian politician

Yang Berhormat Tuan Steven Tiw Tee Siang MLA
- 张迪翔

Member of the Perak State Legislative Assembly for Tronoh
- Incumbent
- Assumed office 19 November 2022
- Preceded by: Paul Yong Choo Kiong (PH–DAP)
- Majority: 11,372 (2022)

Youth International Secretary of the Democratic Action Party
- Incumbent
- Assumed office 17 November 2024
- Assistant: Kusaaliny Mahendran
- Secretary-General: Anthony Loke Siew Fook
- Youth Chief: Woo Kah Leong
- Preceded by: Lim Yi Wei

Personal details
- Born: Steven Tiw Tee Siang; 26 November 1993 (age 32) Perak, Malaysia
- Citizenship: Malaysian
- Party: Democratic Action Party (DAP)
- Other political affiliations: Pakatan Harapan (PH)
- Spouse: Ashley Shum (沈婷婷) (m. 2023)
- Occupation: Politician

Steven Tiw Tee Siang

Chinese name
- Traditional Chinese: 張迪翔
- Simplified Chinese: 张迪翔
Transcriptions
Standard Mandarin
- Hanyu Pinyin: Zhāng Díxiáng

Steven Tiw Tee Siang (simplified Chinese: 张迪翔; traditional Chinese: 張迪翔; pinyin: Zhāng Díxiáng; born 26 November 1993) is a Malaysian politician who has served as Member of the Perak State Legislative Assembly (MLA) for Tronoh since November 2022. He is a member of the Democratic Action Party (DAP), a component party of the Pakatan Harapan (PH) coalition. He has also served as the Youth International Secretary of DAP since November 2024. He was Member of the Ipoh City Council (MBI), Political Secretary to the Member of Parliament (MP) for Ipoh Timor Wong Kah Woh, Youth Secretary and Youth Organising Secretary of DAP of Perak. He is presently the youngest Perak MLA at the age of 32 years, 244 days and was also the youngest candidate in the 2022 Perak state election.

== Member of the Perak State Legislative Assembly (since 2022) ==
In the 2022 Perak state election, Tiw made his electoral debut after being nominated by PH to contest the Tronoh state seat. Tiw won the seat and was elected to the Perak State Legislative Assembly as the Tronoh MLA after defeating Sin Koon Yen of Perikatan Nasional (PN), Leong Chee Wai of Barisan Nasional (BN), Bryan Yong Wu Sean of Parti Bangsa Malaysia (PBM), who is also the son of incumbent Tronoh MLA Paul Yong Choo Kiong, Roslan Ismail of Homeland Fighters Party (PEJUANG) and independent candidate Meor Shahimudin Hashim by a majority of 11,372 votes.

== Personal life ==
On 20 October 2023, Tiw proposed to his girlfriend Ashley Shum, whom he had been dating for two years. Shum accepted and they got engaged. On 12 December 2023, the couple married.

== Election results ==
Perak State Legislative Assembly
Year	Constituency	Candidate	Votes	Pct	Opponent(s)	Votes	Pct	Ballots cast	Majority	Turnout
2022	N33 Tronoh	Steven Tiw Tee Siang (DAP)	15,602	63.35%	Sin Koon Yen (Gerakan)	4,230	17.17%	24,630	11,372	64.61%
2022	N33 Tronoh	Steven Tiw Tee Siang (DAP)	15,602	63.35%	Leong Chee Wai (MCA)	3,351	13.61%	24,630	11,372	64.61%
2022	N33 Tronoh	Steven Tiw Tee Siang (DAP)	15,602	63.35%	Bryan Yong Wu Sean (PBM)	710	2.88%	24,630	11,372	64.61%
2022	N33 Tronoh	Steven Tiw Tee Siang (DAP)	15,602	63.35%	Roslan Ismail (PEJUANG)	478	1.94%	24,630	11,372	64.61%
2022	N33 Tronoh	Steven Tiw Tee Siang (DAP)	15,602	63.35%	Meor Shahimudin Hashim (IND)	259	1.05%	24,630	11,372	64.61%
