= Aminuddin Zulkipli =

Malaysian politician

- أمين الدين بن ذوالكفل

Deputy Speaker of the Perak State Legislative Assembly
- In office 2 July 2018 – 12 May 2020
- Monarch: Nazrin Shah
- Menteri Besar: Ahmad Faizal Azumu
- Speaker: Ngeh Koo Ham
- Preceded by: Nasarudin Hashim
- Succeeded by: Khalil Yahaya
- Constituency: Behrang

Member of the Perak State Legislative Assembly for Behrang
- In office 9 May 2018 – 19 November 2022
- Preceded by: Rusnah Kassim (BN–UMNO)
- Succeeded by: Salina Samsudin (BN–UMNO)
- Majority: 409 (2018)

Personal details
- Born: Aminuddin bin Zulkipli Perak, Malaysia
- Citizenship: Malaysian
- Party: Malaysian Islamic Party (PAS) (–2015); National Trust Party (AMANAH) (since 2015)
- Other political affiliations: Pakatan Rakyat (PR) (–2015); Pakatan Harapan (PH) (since 2015)
- Occupation: Politician

Aminuddin bin Zulkipli is a Malaysian politician who served as Deputy Speaker of the Perak State Legislative Assembly from July 2018 to May 2020 and Member of the Perak Assembly (MLA) for Behrang from May 2018 to November 2022. He is a member of the National Trust Party (AMANAH), a component party of the Pakatan Harapan (PH) and was a member of the Malaysian Islamic Party (PAS), a component party of formerly Pakatan Rakyat (PR) coalition.

== Election results ==
Perak State Legislative Assembly
Year	Constituency	Candidate	Votes	Pct	Opponent(s)	Votes	Pct	Ballots cast	Majority	Turnout
2013	N58 Slim	Aminuddin Zulkipli (PAS)	7,299	39.14%	Mohd Khusairi Abdul Talib (UMNO)	11,152	59.79%	18,954	3,853	85.20%
2013	N58 Slim	Aminuddin Zulkipli (PAS)	7,299	39.14%	Mosses Ramiah (IND)	200	1.07%	18,954	3,853	85.20%
2018	N59 Behrang	Aminuddin Zulkipli (AMANAH)	9,770	43.49%	Rusnah Kassim (UMNO)	9,361	41.67%	22,938	409	82.00%
2018	N59 Behrang	Aminuddin Zulkipli (AMANAH)	9,770	43.49%	Sayed Zamzuri Sayed Nengah (PAS)	3,334	14.84%	22,938	409	82.00%
