= Behrang (state constituency) =

Political subdivision in Malaysia

Behrang (N59)
Perak constituency

State constituency
- Legislature: Perak State Legislative Assembly
MLA
Salina Samsudin
BN
- Constituency created: 2003
- First contested: 2004
- Last contested: 2022

Demographics
- Electors (2022): 39,917

Behrang is a state constituency in Perak, Malaysia, that has been represented in the Perak State Legislative Assembly.

== Demographics ==
Ethnic breakdown of Behrang's electorate as of 2022
1. Malay (60.2%)
2. Chinese (16.0%)
3. Other ethnicities (13.6%)
4. Indian (10.2%)

== History ==
=== Polling districts ===
According to the federal gazette issued on 30 March 2018, the Behrang constituency is divided into 22 polling districts.

State constituency	Polling District	Code	Location
Behrang (N59)	Kampong Poh	077/59/01	SK Kampong Poh
Behrang (N59)	Perlok	077/59/02	SK Perlok; SK Jernang
Behrang (N59)	Klah	077/59/03	SK Pos Tenau
Behrang (N59)	Trolak Timor	077/59/04	SK FELDA Sungai Kelah
Behrang (N59)	Pos Bersih	077/59/05	SK Trolak Timur
Behrang (N59)	Ulu Slim	077/59/06	SK Pos Bersih
Behrang (N59)	Ulu Slim	077/59/07	SK Ulu Slim
Behrang (N59)	Slim Village	077/59/08	SJK (C) Ho Pin
Behrang (N59)	Kampong Sawa	077/59/09	SK Slim Village
Behrang (N59)	Ladang Clunny	077/59/10	SJK (T) Ladang Clunny
Behrang (N59)	Kampong Balun	077/59/11	SK Balun
Behrang (N59)	Behrang Station	077/59/12	SK Sungai Behrang
Behrang (N59)	Behrang Timor	077/59/13	SK Dato Kamaruddin
Behrang (N59)	Behrang Ulu	078/59/14	SK Behrang
Behrang (N59)	Kampong Sungai Sekiah	078/59/15	SJK (C) Behrang Ulu
Behrang (N59)	Kampong Keteyong	077/59/16	SK Tanjong Malim
Behrang (N59)	Kampong Simpang Ampat	077/59/17	SMK Methodist
Behrang (N59)	Kampong Lambak	077/59/18	SK Tanjong Malim
Behrang (N59)	Jalan Keteyong	077/59/19	SJK (T) Tan Sri Dato' Manickavasagam
Behrang (N59)	Kampong Melaka	077/59/20	SJK (T) Tan Sri Dato' Manickavasagam
Behrang (N59)	Jalan Beirop	077/59/21	SMK Methodist
Behrang (N59)	Kampong Loke Yew	077/59/22	SRA Rakyat Al-Jihadiah

=== Representation history ===
Members of the Legislative Assembly for Behrang
Assembly	No	Years	Member	Party
Constituency created from Slim and Sungkai
11th	N59	2004-2008	Appalannaldu Rajoo	BN (MIC)
12th	N59	2008-2009	Jamaluddin Mohd Radzi	PR (PKR)
12th	N59	2009-2013	Jamaluddin Mohd Radzi	Independent
13th	N59	2013-2018	Rusnah Kassim	BN (UMNO)
14th	N59	2018-2022	Aminuddin Zulkipli	PH (AMANAH)
15th	N59	2022–present	Salina Samsudin	BN (UMNO)

== Election results ==
Perak state election, 2022
Party	Candidate	Votes	%	∆%
BN	Salina Samsudin	10,337	34.42	▼7.28
PH	Khairol Najib Hashim	10,135	33.75	▲33.75
PN	Mohd Amran Ibrahim	9,240	30.77	▲30.77
PEJUANG	Hazvee Hafiz	317	1.06	▲1.06
Total valid votes		30,029	100.00	
Total rejected ballots		486		
Unreturned ballots		145		
Turnout		30,660	76.56	▼5.47
Registered electors		39,917		
Majority		202	0.67	▼1.12
BN gain from PKR		Swing		?

Perak state election, 2018
Party	Candidate	Votes	%	∆%
PKR	Aminuddin Zulkipli	9,770	43.49	▲0.75
BN	Rusnah Kassim	9,361	41.70	▼11.75
PAS	Sayed Zamzuri	3,334	14.84	▲14.84
Total valid votes		22,465	97.94	
Total rejected ballots		412	1.80	
Unreturned ballots		61	0.27	
Turnout		22,938	82.03	▼0.67
Registered electors		27,963		
Majority		409	1.79	▼8.92
PKR gain from BN		Swing		?
Source(s) "RESULTS OF CONTESTED ELECTION AND STATEMENTS OF THE POLL AFTER THE OFFICIAL ADDITION OF VOTES".

Perak state election, 2013
Party	Candidate	Votes	%	∆%
BN	Rusnah Kassim	9,823	53.45	▲7.55
PKR	Ustaz Abdul Hadi Abdul Khatab	7,855	42.74	▼3.16
Independent	Kamal Badri Zainudin	358	1.95	▲1.95
Independent	Ramnaidu Suridemudu	341	1.86	▲1.86
Total valid votes		18,377	97.11	
Total rejected ballots		496	2.62	
Unreturned ballots		50	0.26	
Turnout		18,923	82.70	▲12.27
Registered electors		22,894		
Majority		1,968	10.71	▼2.51
BN gain from PKR		Swing		?
Source(s) "KEPUTUSAN PILIHAN RAYA UMUM DEWAN UNDANGAN NEGERI". Archived from the original on 2013-06-09.

Perak state election, 2008
Party	Candidate	Votes	%	∆%
PKR	Jamaluddin Mohd Radzi	6,771	54.10	▼32.58
BN	Ramasamy Muthusamy	5,744	45.90	▲32.58
Total valid votes		12,515	95.78	
Total rejected ballots		512	3.92	
Unreturned ballots		40	0.31	
Turnout		13,067	70.43	▲5.89
Registered electors		18,552		
Majority		1,027	8.20	▼24.38
PKR gain from BN		Swing		?
Source(s) "KEPUTUSAN PILIHAN RAYA UMUM DEWAN UNDANGAN NEGERI PERAK BAGI TAHUN 2008".

Perak state election, 2004
Party	Candidate	Votes	%
BN	Appalannaidu Rajoo	7,627	66.29
PKR	Jamaluddin Mohd Radzi	3,879	33.71
Total valid votes		11,506	96.53
Total rejected ballots		371	3.11
Unreturned ballots		42	0.35
Turnout		11,919	64.54
Registered electors		18,467	
Majority		3,748	32.58
This was a new constituency created.
Source(s) "KEPUTUSAN PILIHAN RAYA UMUM DEWAN UNDANGAN NEGERI PERAK BAGI TAHUN 2004".
