= Mah Hang Soon =

Malaysian politician

Yang Berbahagia Dato' Mah Hang Soon DPMP
- 马汉顺

Deputy Minister of Education I
- In office 30 August 2021 – 24 November 2022 Serving with Mohamad Alamin (Deputy Minister of Education II)
- Monarch: Abdullah
- Prime Minister: Ismail Sabri Yaakob
- Minister: Radzi Jidin
- Preceded by: Himself
- Succeeded by: Lim Hui Ying (Deputy Minister of Education)
- Constituency: Senator
- In office 10 March 2020 – 16 August 2021 Serving with Muslimin Yahaya (Deputy Minister of Education II)
- Monarch: Abdullah
- Prime Minister: Muhyiddin Yassin
- Minister: Radzi Jidin
- Preceded by: Teo Nie Ching (Deputy Minister of Education)
- Succeeded by: Himself
- Constituency: Senator

Senator
- In office 10 March 2020 – 5 November 2022
- Monarch: Abdullah
- Prime Minister: Muhyiddin Yassin (2020—2021); Ismail Sabri Yaakob (2021—2022)

Member of the Perak State Executive Council
- In office 12 May 2014 – 12 May 2018
- Monarchs: Azlan Shah; Nazrin Shah
- Menteri Besar: Zambry Abdul Kadir
- Portfolio: Health, Public Transport, Non-Muslim Affairs, National Integration and New Villages
- Preceded by: Nolee Ashilin Mohamed Radzi (Health); Zambry Abdul Kadir (Public Transport and Non-Muslim Affairs); Rusnah Kassim (National Integration)
- Succeeded by: Sivanesan Achalingam (Health and National Integration); Paul Yong Choo Kiong (Public Transport, Non-Muslim Affairs and New Villages)
- Constituency: Chenderiang
- In office 10 February 2009 – 17 May 2013
- Monarch: Azlan Shah
- Menteri Besar: Zambry Abdul Kadir
- Portfolio: Health, Local Government, Consumer Affairs, Environment, Public Transport dan Non-Muslim Affairs
- Preceded by: Sivanesan Achalingam (Health and Environment); Nga Kor Ming (Local Government and Public Transport); Chen Fook Chye (Consumer Affairs); Ngeh Koo Ham (Non-Muslim Affairs)
- Succeeded by: Nolee Ashilin Mohamed Radzi (Health); Saarani Mohamad (Local Government); Samsudin Abu Hassan (Consumer Affairs); Muhammad Amin Zakaria (Environment); Zambry Abdul Kadir (Public Transport and Non-Muslim Affairs)
- Constituency: Chenderiang

Member of the Perak State Legislative Assembly for Chenderiang
- In office 8 March 2008 – 9 May 2018
- Preceded by: Chan Kon You (BN–MCA)
- Succeeded by: Ahmad Faizal Azumu (PH–BERSATU)
- Majority: 3,392 (2008); 4,467 (2013)

Deputy President of the Malaysian Chinese Association
- Incumbent
- Assumed office 4 November 2018
- President: Wee Ka Siong
- Preceded by: Wee Ka Siong

Faction represented in Dewan Negara
- 2020–2022: Barisan Nasional

Faction represented in Perak State Legislative Assembly
- 2008–2018: Barisan Nasional

Personal details
- Born: Mah Hang Soon; 19 July 1965 (age 61) Changkat Keruing, Perak, Malaysia
- Party: Malaysian Chinese Association (MCA)
- Other political affiliations: Barisan Nasional (BN)
- Education: Universiti Malaya
- Profession: Cardiologist
- Mah Hang Soon on Facebook

Mah Hang Soon (simplified Chinese: 马汉顺; traditional Chinese: 馬漢順, Bàng-uâ-cê: Mā Háng-sông; Pe̍h-ōe-jī: Má Hàn-sūn; born 19 July 1965) is a Malaysian politician who served as Deputy Minister of Education I for the second term in the Barisan Nasional (BN) administration under former Prime Minister Ismail Sabri Yaakob and former Minister Radzi Jidin from August 2021 to the collapse of the BN administration in November 2022 and the first term in the Perikatan Nasional (PN) administration under former Prime Minister Muhyiddin Yassin and former Minister Radzi from March 2020 to the collapse of PN administration in August 2021, Senator from March 2020 to his resignation in November 2022 as well as Member of the Perak State Legislative Assembly (MLA) for Chenderiang from March 2008 to May 2018. He is a member of the Malaysian Chinese Association (MCA), a component party of the BN coalition. He has served as the Deputy President of MCA since November 2018.

== Background ==
Mah is a cardiologist and graduate of the University of Malaya. He has been involved in full-time politics since 2008.

Originally from Kampung Baru Changkat Kruing, Ayer Tawar, Perak Darul Ridzuan. He is the eldest of six siblings. His father's name was Mah Chow Nam (1944–2014), whilst his mother was Lee Kee Hiong (1942–), were smallholders of rubber and oil palm. He married Lim Soo Lee and had a son named Mah Song Wei (1996–).

== Malaysian Chinese Association (MCA) ==
He is the current deputy president of MCA. He was previously the National MCA Youth Vice President and the Perak MCA Youth Chief in 2008–2010. From 2013 until now, he is the Chairman of the MCA Perak and the Central Council (CC).

== Political career ==
In the 11th Malaysian general election, Dr. Mah made his debut and contested the Jelapang state seat in the Perak State Legislative Assembly. He failed to win the seat by 7,981 votes compared to Hee Yit Foong, a Democratic Action Party (DAP) candidate who gained 8,233 votes.

In the 12th Malaysian general election, he won the state assembly state seat for Chenderiang with a majority of 3,392 votes and retained it in the 13th Malaysian general election with a majority of 4,767 votes.

During his two terms as Perak State Assemblyman, Dr. Mah has served in the Perak State Executive Council as the Chairman of the Health, Local Government, Consumer Affairs, Environment, Transportation and Non-Muslim Affairs (2009–2013); and Chairman of the Committee on Health, Public Transportation, Non-Islamic Affairs, National Integration and New Villages (2014–2018).

Dr. Mah was picked as the BN candidate to contest the Tanjong Malim parliamentary seat instead in the 14th Malaysian general election (GE14) even though his candidacy received protest from incumbent Ong Ka Chuan's party supporters who had protested in front of the Bangunan Perdana, Putrajaya prior to the nomination day. He however lost to the People's Justice Party (PKR) candidate Chang Lih Kang. The total number of votes he received was 19,314 while the PKR candidate received 24,672 votes with a majority of 5,358 votes. Overall, BN lost the parliamentary majority and failed to form the Federal Government in the GE14.

== Election results ==
Perak State Legislative Assembly
| Year | Constituency | Candidate | Votes | Pct | Opponent(s) | Votes | Pct | Ballots cast | Majority | Turnout |
|---|---|---|---|---|---|---|---|---|---|---|
| 2004 | N31 Jelapang | Mah Hang Soon (MCA) | 7,978 | 48.16% | Hee Yit Foong (DAP) | 8,231 | 49.68% | 16,921 | 253 | 70.39% |
| 2004 | N31 Jelapang | Mah Hang Soon (MCA) | 7,978 | 48.16% | Foo Tiew Kok (PKR) | 358 | 2.16% | 16,921 | 253 | 70.39% |
| 2008 | N46 Chenderiang | Mah Hang Soon (MCA) | 7,451 | 64.74% | Arjunan Muthu (PKR) | 4,059 | 35.26% | 12,115 | 3,392 | 66.96% |
| 2013 | N46 Chenderiang | Mah Hang Soon (MCA) | 10,866 | 64.05% | Amani Williams Hunt Abdullah (PKR) | 6,099 | 35.95% | 17,542 | 4,767 | 80.70% |

Parliament of Malaysia
| Year | Constituency | Candidate | Votes | Pct | Opponent(s) | Votes | Pct | Ballots cast | Majority | Turnout |
|---|---|---|---|---|---|---|---|---|---|---|
| 2018 | P077 Tanjong Malim | Mah Hang Soon (MCA) | 19,314 | 35.57% | Chang Lih Kang (PKR) | 24,672 | 45.44% | 55,613 | 5,358 | 81.22% |
| 2018 | P077 Tanjong Malim | Mah Hang Soon (MCA) | 19,314 | 35.57% | Mohd Tarmizi (PAS) | 10,311 | 18.99% | 55,613 | 5,358 | 81.22% |
| 2022 | P077 Tanjong Malim | Mah Hang Soon (MCA) | 20,963 | 30.09% | Chang Lih Kang (PKR) | 25,140 | 36.08% | 69,671 | 3,541 | 74.22% |
| 2022 | P077 Tanjong Malim | Mah Hang Soon (MCA) | 20,963 | 30.09% | Nolee Ashilin Mohammed Radzi (BERSATU) | 21,599 | 31.00% | 69,671 | 3,541 | 74.22% |
| 2022 | P077 Tanjong Malim | Mah Hang Soon (MCA) | 20,963 | 30.09% | Jamaluddin Mohd Radzi (IND) | 1,032 | 1.48% | 69,671 | 3,541 | 74.22% |
| 2022 | P077 Tanjong Malim | Mah Hang Soon (MCA) | 20,963 | 30.09% | Amir Hamzah Abdul Rajak (IMAN) | 609 | 0.87% | 69,671 | 3,541 | 74.22% |
| 2022 | P077 Tanjong Malim | Mah Hang Soon (MCA) | 20,963 | 30.09% | Ishak Zuhari (IND) | 328 | 0.47% | 69,671 | 3,541 | 74.22% |

== Honours ==
- Perak
  - Knight Commander of the Order of the Perak State Crown (DPMP) – Dato' (2009)
