= Mohd Khusairi Abdul Talib =

Malaysian politician (1961–2020)

Yang Berbahagia Dato' Mohd Khusairi Abdul Talib DPMP PPT
- محمد خساءيري بن عبدالطالب

Member of the Perak State Legislative Assembly for Slim
- In office 21 March 2004 – 15 July 2020
- Preceded by: Junus Wahid (BN–UMNO)
- Succeeded by: Mohd Zaidi Aziz (BN–UMNO)
- Majority: 4,875 (2004); 3,526 (2008); 3,853 (2013); 2,183 (2018)

Personal details
- Born: Mohd Khusairi bin Abdul Talib; 20 January 1961 Perak, Federation of Malaya (Malaysia)
- Died: 15 July 2020 (aged 59) Bentong Hospital, Pahang, Malaysia
- Resting place: Felda Sungai Behrang Muslim Cemetery, Slim River, Perak, Malaysia
- Party: United Malays National Organisation (UMNO)
- Other political affiliations: Barisan Nasional (BN)
- Occupation: Politician
- Website: Official blogspot
- Mohd Khusairi Abdul Talib on Facebook

Mohd Khusairi Abdul Talib (20 January 1961 – 15 July 2020) was a Malaysian politician who served as Member of the Perak State Legislative Assembly for Slim from March 2004 to his death in July 2020. He was a member and Member of the Supreme Council of the United Malays National Organisation (UMNO), a component party of the Barisan Nasional (BN) coalition. He was also Chairman of the National Film Development Corporation (FINAS).

== Election results ==
Perak State Legislative Assembly
Year	Constituency	Candidate	Votes	Pct	Opponent(s)	Votes	Pct	Ballots cast	Majority	Turnout
2004	N58 Slim	Mohd Khusairi Abdul Talib (UMNO)	8,318	69.09%	Mohd Tarmizi Ab Rahman (PAS)	3,443	28.60%	12,039	4,875	72.27%
2008	N58 Slim	Mohd Khusairi Abdul Talib (UMNO)	8,233	61.80%	Zulqarnain Hassan (PAS)	4,707	35.34%	13,321	3,526	75.52%
2013	N58 Slim	Mohd Khusairi Abdul Talib (UMNO)	11,152	58.65%	Aminuddin Zulkipli (PAS)	7,299	38.38%	19,016	3,853	85.20%
2013	N58 Slim	Mohd Khusairi Abdul Talib (UMNO)	11,152	58.65%	Mosses Ramiah (IND)	200	1.05%	19,016	3,853	85.20%
2018	N58 Slim	Mohd Khusairi Abdul Talib (UMNO)	8,327	43.69%	Mohd. Amran Ibrahim (PPBM)	6,144	32.24%	19,060	2,183	85.00%
2018	N58 Slim	Mohd Khusairi Abdul Talib (UMNO)	8,327	43.69%	Muhammad Zulfadli Zainal (PAS)	4,103	21.53%	19,060	2,183	85.00%

== Honours ==
- Perak
  - Knight Commander of the Order of the Perak State Crown (DPMP) – Dato' (2005)
  - Recipient of the Distinguished Conduct Medal (PPT) (1999)

== Death ==
Mohd Khusairi died at the age of 59 in Bentong Hospital after a heart attack while playing golf at the Awana Genting Highlands Golf & Country on 15 July 2020. He was buried the next day in Islamic Cemetery Felda Sungai Behrang.
