= Hulu Kinta =

Political subdivision in Malaysia

Hulu Kinta (N24)
Perak constituency

State constituency
- Legislature: Perak State Legislative Assembly
MLA
Muhamad Arafat Varisai Mahamad
PH
- Constituency created: 1994
- First contested: 1995
- Last contested: 2022

Demographics
- Electors (2022): 74,292

Hulu Kinta is a state constituency in Perak, Malaysia, that has been represented in the Perak State Legislative Assembly.

== Demographics ==
Ethnic breakdown of Hulu Kinta's electorate as of 2022
1. Malay (57.6%)
2. Chinese (25.0%)
3. Indian (13.3%)
4. Other ethnicities (4.04%)

== History ==
=== Polling districts ===
According to the gazette issued on 30 March 2018, the Hulu Kinta constituency has a total of 19 polling districts.

State constituency	Polling District	Code	Location
Hulu Kinta（N24）	Kanthan	063/24/01	SJK (C) Chong Hwa
Hulu Kinta（N24）	Kuang	063/24/02	SK Syed Idrus
Hulu Kinta（N24）	Kampong Ulu Chemor	063/24/03	SRA Rakyat Al-Mohsiniah
Hulu Kinta（N24）	Kampong Chik Zainal	063/24/04	SRA Al-Ikhlasiah
Hulu Kinta（N24）	Tanah Hitam	063/24/05	SJK (C) Tanah Hitam
Hulu Kinta（N24）	Changkat Kinding	063/24/06	SJK (T) Ladang Changkat Kinding
Hulu Kinta（N24）	Hospital Bahagia	063/24/07	SK Methodist
Hulu Kinta（N24）	Tanjong Rambutan	063/24/08	SK Seri Tanjung
Hulu Kinta（N24）	Tanjong Rambutan Utara	063/24/09	SJK (T) Tanjong Rambutan
Hulu Kinta（N24）	Tanjong Rambutan Barat	063/24/10	SK Tanjong Rambutan
Hulu Kinta（N24）	Kawasan Polis Hutan	063/24/11	SK Pasukan Polis Hutan
Hulu Kinta（N24）	Kampung Tersusun Batu 8	063/24/12	SRA Rakyat Asy Shukuriah
Hulu Kinta（N24）	Bandar Baru Putra	063/24/13	SK Bandar Baru Putera
Hulu Kinta（N24）	Pakatan Jaya	063/24/14	SK Pakatan Jaya
Hulu Kinta（N24）	Taman Perpaduan	063/24/15	SK Perpaduan
Hulu Kinta（N24）	Bandar Baru Sunway	063/24/16	SA Rakyat Nurul Hidayah
Hulu Kinta（N24）	Kampong Tersusun Batu 5	063/24/17	SMK Tambun
Hulu Kinta（N24）	Tambun	063/24/18	SK Tambun
Hulu Kinta（N24）	Jalan Tambun	063/24/19	SJK (C) Hing Hwa

=== Representation history ===
Members of the Perak State Assembly for Hulu Kinta
Assembly	No	Years	Member	Party
Constituency created from Chemor and Sungai Rokam
9th	N21	1995 – 1999	Mazidah Zakariah	BN (UMNO)
10th	N21	1999 – 2004	Mazidah Zakariah	BN (UMNO)
11th	N24	2004 – 2008	Mazidah Zakariah	BN (UMNO)
12th	N24	2008 – 2013	Rosnah Kassim	BN (UMNO)
13th	N24	2013 – 2018	Aminuddin Mohd Hanafiah	BN (UMNO)
14th	N24	2018 – 2022	Muhamad Arafat Varisai Mahamad	PH (PKR)
15th	N24	2022 – present	Muhamad Arafat Varisai Mahamad	PH (PKR)

== Election results ==
Perak state election, 2022: Hulu Kinta
Party	Candidate	Votes	%	∆%
PH	Muhamad Arafat Varisai Mahamad	22,220	39.02	▲39.02
PN	Puteri Holijah Muhamad Rali	18,057	31.71	▲31.71
BN	Mazlan Abd Rahman	16,224	28.49	▼7.12
Independent	Murugiah Subramaniam	437	0.77	▲0.77
Total valid votes		56,938	100.00	
Total rejected ballots		846		
Unreturned ballots		139		
Turnout		57,923	77.97	▼3.42
Registered electors		74,292		
Majority		4,163	7.31	▼14.13
PH hold		Swing		

Perak state election, 2018: Hulu Kinta
Party	Candidate	Votes	%	∆%
PKR	Muhamad Arafat Varisai Mahamad	17,766	45.02	▲5.00
BN	Aminuddin Mohd. Hanafiah	14,053	35.61	▼23.58
PAS	Mat Salleh Said	7,425	18.82	▲18.82
Independent	Murugiah A/L Subramaniam	217	0.55	▲0.55
Total valid votes		39,461	97.05	
Total rejected ballots		859	2.11	
Unreturned ballots		339	0.83	
Turnout		40,659	81.39	▼3.31
Registered electors		49,946		
Majority		3,713	21.44	▲2.27
PKR gain from BN		Swing		?
Source(s) "RESULTS OF CONTESTED ELECTION AND STATEMENTS OF THE POLL AFTER THE OFFICIAL ADDITION OF VOTES". Archived from the original on 2023-04-28.

Perak state election, 2013: Hulu Kinta
Party	Candidate	Votes	%	∆%
BN	Aminuddin Mohd. Hanafiah	18,893	59.19	▼2.28
PKR	Matinagaran A/L Arumugam	12,775	40.02	▲3.18
Independent	Sulaiman Zakariya	250	0.78	▲0.77
Total valid votes		31,918	98.10	
Total rejected ballots		616	1.70	
Unreturned ballots		2	0.14	
Turnout		32,536	84.70	▼9.27
Registered electors		38,399		
Majority		6,118	19.17	▼5.51
BN hold		Swing		
Source(s) "KEPUTUSAN PILIHAN RAYA UMUM DEWAN UNDANGAN NEGERI". Archived from the original on 2022-03-17.

Perak state election, 2008: Hulu Kinta
Party	Candidate	Votes	%	∆%
BN	Rosnah Kassim	13,057	61.47	▼9.24
PKR	Ayyathurai A/L Achutharaman	7,825	36.84	▲36.84
Independent	Sathiya Seelan A/L Munisamy	360	1.63	▲1.63
Total valid votes		21,242	96.02	
Total rejected ballots		629	2.84	
Unreturned ballots		251	1.13	
Turnout		22,122	75.43	▲1.98
Registered electors		29,326		
Majority		5,232	24.68	▼16.74
BN hold		Swing		
Source(s) "KEPUTUSAN PILIHAN RAYA UMUM DEWAN UNDANGAN NEGERI PERAK BAGI TAHUN 2008".

Perak state election, 2004: Hulu Kinta
Party	Candidate	Votes	%	∆%
BN	Mazidah Zakariah	14,104	70.71	▲8.70
PAS	Zulkurnaini Ibrahim	5,843	29.29	▲8.70
Total valid votes		19,947	95.96	
Total rejected ballots		800	3.85	
Unreturned ballots		40	0.19	
Turnout		20,787	73.45	▲0.02
Registered electors		28,313		
Majority		8,261	41.42	▲17.40
BN hold		Swing		
Source(s) "KEPUTUSAN PILIHAN RAYA UMUM DEWAN UNDANGAN NEGERI PERAK BAGI TAHUN 2004".

Perak state election, 1999: Hulu Kinta
Party	Candidate	Votes	%	∆%
BN	Mazidah Zakariah	12,174	62.01	▼21.16
S46	Yahya Ariff	7,457	37.99	▲21.16
Total valid votes		19,631	88.34	
Total rejected ballots		654	2.94	
Unreturned ballots		1,938	8.72	
Turnout		22,223	73.42	▼1.94
Registered electors		29,791		
Majority		4,717	24.02	▼43.72
BN hold		Swing		
Source(s) "KEPUTUSAN PILIHAN RAYA UMUM DEWAN UNDANGAN NEGERI PERAK BAGI TAHUN 1999".

Perak state election, 1995: Hulu Kinta
Party	Candidate	Votes	%
BN	Mazidah Zakariah	16,009	83.17
S46	Meor Termizi Mior Yusof	3,240	16.83
Total valid votes		19,249	91.68
Total rejected ballots		497	2.37
Unreturned ballots		1,251	5.96
Turnout		20,997	75.36
Registered electors		27,862	
Majority		12,769	67.74
This was a new constituency created.
Source(s) "KEPUTUSAN PILIHAN RAYA UMUM DEWAN UNDANGAN NEGERI PERAK BAGI TAHUN 1995".
