= Hee Yit Foong =

Malaysian politician

Yang Berbahagia Dato' Hee Yit Foong DPMP
- 许月凤

Deputy Speaker of the Perak State Legislative Assembly
- In office 2008–2013

Member of the Perak State Legislative Assembly for Jelapang
- In office 21 March 2004 – 5 May 2013
- Preceded by: Newly created constituency
- Succeeded by: Teh Hock Ke (PR–DAP)
- Majority: 253 (2004); 6,707 (2008)

Personal details
- Born: Hee Yit Foong; 4 December 1963 (age 62) Perak, Malaysia
- Citizenship: Malaysian
- Party: Independent (from February 2009); DAP (–2009)
- Other political affiliations: Pakatan Rakyat (until February 2009)
- Spouse: Quay Chin Teik
- Occupation: Politician

Hee Yit Foong (simplified Chinese: 许月凤; traditional Chinese: 許月鳳; pinyin: Xǔ Yuèfèng; Jyutping: Heoi2 Jyut6 Fung6; Pe̍h-ōe-jī: Khó͘ Goa̍t-hōng; born 4 December 1963) is a Malaysian politician who is infamous for her role in the 2009 Perak constitutional crisis by resigning from the Democratic Action Party (DAP) which she represented in the 2008 Malaysian general election and becoming an independent aligned with the ruling Barisan Nasional (BN). Her dramatic action was seen as an act of betrayal by many in her Jelapang constituency and has earned her unpleasant nicknames from the angry voters and Malaysian public such as 'traitor', 'running dog' and 'leaping frog'.

== Background ==
Hee walks with a limp from a case of polio she contracted at the age of 4. She was state assemblywoman for Jelapang for two terms from 2004 to 2013 and was the first disabled woman to become the speaker of a Malaysian legislative body. She served as Deputy Speaker of the Perak State Legislative Assembly from March 2008 to February 2009. She was a member of the opposition DAP from the late 1980s until her resignation in February 2009 which subsequently caused the 2009 Perak constitutional crisis.

Hee is married to Quay Chin Teik.

== Political career ==
On 4 February 2009, Hee was one of four assembly people who withdrew their support from the incumbent Pakatan Rakyat (PR) government. She announced that she would support the Barisan National coalition instead. This prompted a political crisis in the state.

In an interview with Sin Chew Daily, Hee defended her defection on the grounds that she felt sidelined by the leaders of the Democratic Action Party (DAP) in her state. The following day, Perak DAP secretary Nga Kor Ming told Sin Chew that DAP not only had groomed her from a largely unknown person into a state assemblywoman, but had also made her the first non-Malay female deputy speaker in the country's history and he would have nothing further to comment if Hee still insisted that her action was right. Some people in her constituency reacted with anger at her defection. Many different objects have been thrown, hung and left at her home and service centre while an effigy of her was also burnt in a mock Chinese funeral rite following her defection and resignation from DAP.

Hee, the first non-Malay woman deputy speaker in Malaysia, was said to have been unhappy with the state party leadership for not being selected for a state exco seat, and because she did not get a new official car when the Pakatan Rakyat (PR) government bought Toyota Camrys to replace an ageing fleet of Proton Perdanas. On 9 February 2009, The Malaysian Insider reported that Hee, who had been the subject of ridicule and abuse in and around her Ipoh hometown as well as in cyberspace, would be getting the Camry after all.

On 7 March 2009, Hee showed up at her Jelapang service centre for the first time since her defection. Upon learning that she was there, a group of people started hurling abuses at her, such as "traitor who destroyed Pakatan" and "an ungrateful woman". Hee had to leave the service centre hurriedly after 45 minutes because she feared for her safety.

== 2013 Malaysian General Elections ==
Although she claimed that anger against her had dissipated in the years following the Perak constitutional crisis, Hee did not defend her seat in the 2013 Malaysian general election. Hee stated that she hoped the Barisan Nasional (BN) leadership would appoint a local candidate instead, and reaffirmed her support for BN.

== Election results ==
Perak State Legislative Assembly
Year	Constituency	Candidate	Votes	Pct	Opponent(s)	Votes	Pct	Ballots cast	Majority	Turnout
2004	N31 Jelapang	Hee Yit Foong (DAP)	8,231	48.64%	Mah Hang Soon (MCA)	7,978	47.15%	16,921	253	70.39%
2004	N31 Jelapang	Hee Yit Foong (DAP)	8,231	48.64%	Foo Tiew Kok (PKR)	358	2.12%	16,921	253	70.39%
2008	N31 Jelapang	Hee Yit Foong (DAP)	12,219	62.96%	Loh Koi Pin (MCA)	5,512	28.40%	19,409	6,707	74.20%
2008	N31 Jelapang	Hee Yit Foong (DAP)	12,219	62.96%	Sarasvathy Muthu (IND)	1,275	6.57%	19,409	6,707	74.20%

== Honour and award ==
Hee was bestowed Darjah Dato' Paduka Mahkota Perak (DPMP) that carries the title "Dato'" by the Sultan of Perak, Sultan Azlan Shah, on the occasion of his 82nd birthday on 19 April 2010. Meanwhile, her husband Quay Chin Teik is also a recipient of the Federal Territories award Panglima Mahkota Wilayah (PMW) that carries the title "Datuk" on 1 February 2015.

- Perak
  - Knight Commander of the Order of the Perak State Crown (DPMP) – Dato' (2010)
