= Sekolah Izzuddin Shah =

School in Ipoh, Perak, Malaysia

Coordinates: 4.5941307°N 101.1182124°E

- (SIS)
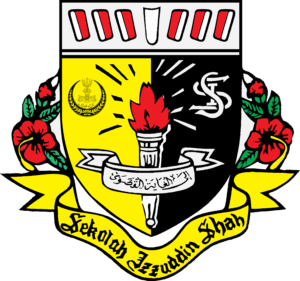

Location
- Jalan Sultan Azlan Shah, 31400; Ipoh, Perak; Malaysia

Information
- Type: Islamic secondary school
- Motto: Ilaa al-Ghayat al-Quswaa الى الغاية القصوى (Arab) (Towards Highest Aim)
- Established: 1959
- School district: Kinta
- Principal: Dr. Haji Mazlan Bin Mohd. Zaki (2025-)
- Grades: Form 1 - Form 6
- Classrooms: Lower form : Ibnu Sina, Ibnu Rushd, Ibnu Khaldun, Ibnu Nafis; Upper form : Ibnu Sina, Ibnnu Rushd, Ibnu Khaldun, Ibnu Nafis
- Houses: Imam Bukhari, Imam Muslim, Imam Abu Daud, Imam Termizi, Imam Ibnu Majah
- Yearbook: Akrab
- Alumni: AlumniSISTA @ PBSISTA ( Persatuan Bekas Pelajar Sekolah Izzuddin Shah dan Sekolah Raja Perempuan Taayah)
- Website: http://www.sekizzuddinshah.edu.my

Sekolah Izzuddin Shah (SIS) is the first all-male fully residential Islamic school in Malaysia. The school is noted for having a dual education stream, academic and Islamic. The Islamic stream is based on the syllabus at Al-Azhar University and conducted fully in Arabic.

== History ==
The school was built in 1959, after an idea by the first Menteri Besar of Perak, Ghazali Jawi. It was named after the then Sultan of Perak, Sultan Yusuf Izzudin. Sultan himself officiated at the school later that year. The administration of the school is by the Perak state government, Majlis Agama Islam dan Adat Melayu Perak and Jabatan Agama Islam Perak. The school was noted for having a dual education stream, academic and Islamic.

At that time, the school began to open classes for Form One by accepting Malay students from Malay schools throughout Perak, especially around Ipoh. The first group of students studied up to the Sijil Pelajaran Malaysia level. SIS offered lessons up to the SPM level and in the early 80s the school began to offer lessons up to Form Six with the Sijil Tinggi Pelajaran Malaysia level. The school opened up for female students only for Form Six. The school also accepted scholarship students from Brunei.

In 1972, the school experienced shutdown due to picket by school students.

== Former students ==
- Ahmad Zahid Hamidi - Deputy Prime Minister of Malaysia
- Asmuni Awi - Member of Perak State Executive Council
- Siddiq Fadzil - Researcher
- Jamaludin Yahya - Member of Parliament (MP) of Pasir Salak
- Muhammad Ismi Mat Taib - MP of Parit
- Hafiz Hamidun - Singer
