= Muhammad Ismi Mat Taib =

Malaysian politician

Yang Berhormat Ustaz Haji Muhammad Ismi Mat Taib MP
- محمّد إسمي مت طيب
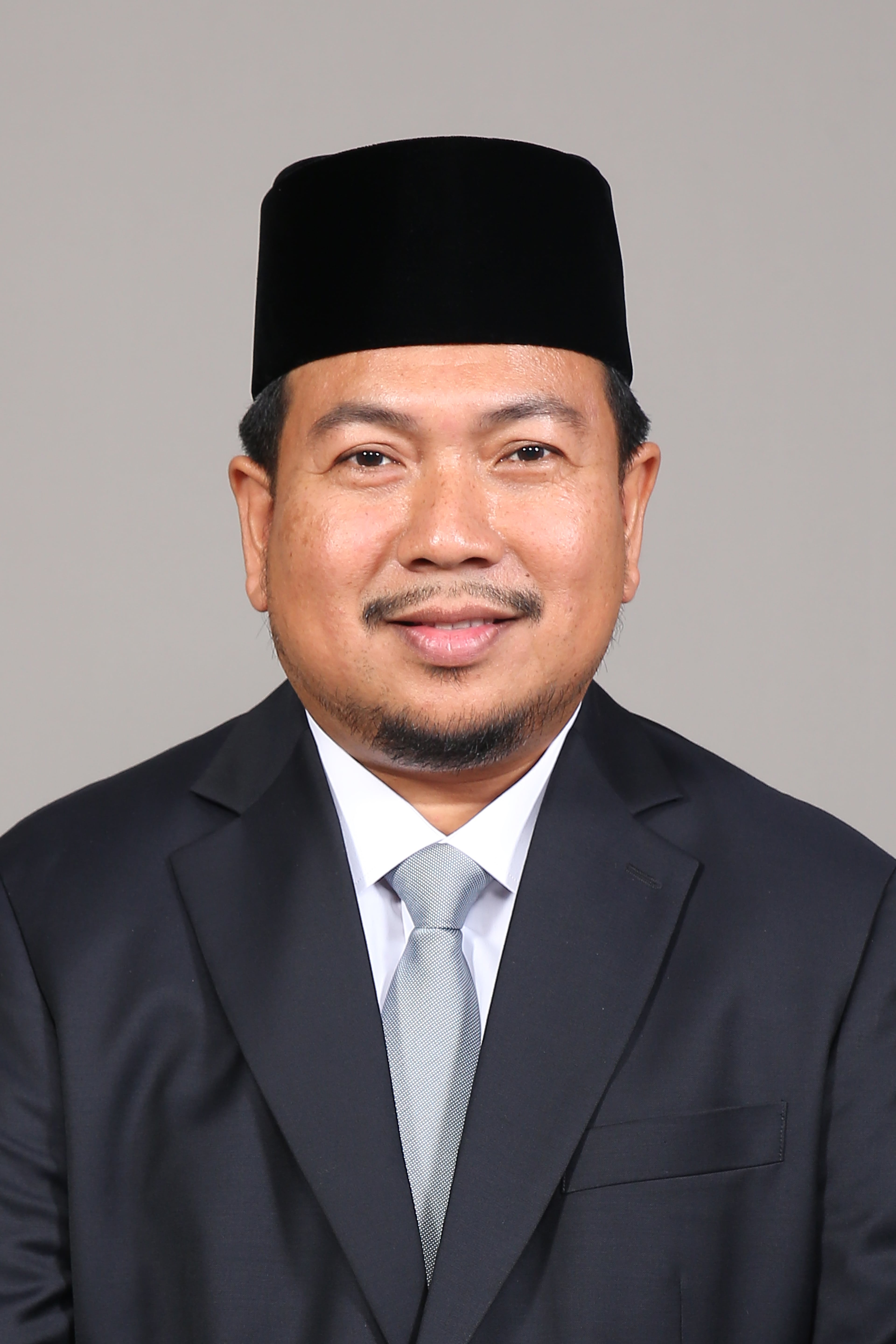

Member of the Malaysian Parliament for Parit
- Incumbent
- Assumed office 19 November 2022
- Preceded by: Mohd Nizar Zakaria (BN–UMNO)
- Majority: 2,155 (2022)

Personal details
- Born: Muhammad Ismi bin Mat Taib; 24 May 1974 (age 52) Kampung Selboh, Parit, Perak, Malaysia
- Party: Malaysian Islamic Party (PAS)
- Other political affiliations: Perikatan Nasional (PN)
- Education: University of Jordan; Universiti Malaya (MA); Sekolah Izzuddin Shah

Ustaz Haji Muhammad Ismi bin Mat Taib (born 24 May 1974) is a Malaysian politician who has served as the Member of Parliament (MP) for Parit since November 2022. He is a member and the Yang di-Pertua (Division Chief) of Parit of the Malaysian Islamic Party (PAS), a component party of Perikatan Nasional (PN). As the MP for Parit, he called for the cancellation of beauty pageants in Malaysia, alleging that beauty pageants featuring revealing outfits could bring calamities.

== Election results ==
Parliament of Malaysia
Year	Constituency	Candidate	Votes	Pct	Opponent(s)	Votes	Pct	Ballots cast	Majority	Turnout
2004	P069 Parit	Muhammad Ismi Mat Taib (PAS)	8,112	38.78%	Nasarudin Hashim (UMNO)	12,808	61.22%	21,532	4,696	74.46%
2013	P069 Parit	Muhammad Ismi Mat Taib (PAS)	11,756	41.97%	Mohd Zaim Abu Hassan (UMNO)	16,253	58.03%	28,613	4,497	85.40%
2022	P069 Parit	Muhammad Ismi Mat Taib (PAS)	17,181	45.76%	Mohd Nizar Zakaria (UMNO)	15,026	40.02%	73,483	2,155	78.36%
2022	P069 Parit	Muhammad Ismi Mat Taib (PAS)	17,181	45.76%	Nurthaqaffah Nordin (AMANAH)	5,063	13.49%	73,483	2,155	78.36%
2022	P069 Parit	Muhammad Ismi Mat Taib (PAS)	17,181	45.76%	Faizol Fadzli Mohamed (PEJUANG)	275	0.73%	73,483	2,155	78.36%

Perak State Legislative Assembly
Year	Constituency	Candidate	Votes	Pct	Opponent(s)	Votes	Pct	Ballots cast	Majority	Turnout
2008	N38 Belanja	Muhammad Ismi Mat Taib (PAS)	4,286	39.39%	Mohd Zaim Abu Hassan (UMNO)	6,596	60.61%	11,154	2,310	77.08%
2018	N40 Bota	Muhammad Ismi Mat Taib (PAS)	5,589	32.74%	Khairul Shahril Mohamed (UMNO)	7,411	43.42%	17,409	1,822	83.04%
2018	N40 Bota	Muhammad Ismi Mat Taib (PAS)	5,589	32.74%	Azrul Hakkim Azhar (BERSATU)	4,070	23.84%	17,409	1,822	83.04%

== Honours ==
=== Honours of Malaysia ===
- Malaysia
  - Recipient of the 17th Yang di-Pertuan Agong Installation Medal
