= Parit (federal constituency) =

Federal constituency in Perak, Malaysia

Parit (P069)
Perak constituency

Federal constituency
- Legislature: Dewan Rakyat
- MP: Muhammad Ismi Mat Taib; PN
- Constituency created: 1958
- First contested: 1959
- Last contested: 2022

Demographics
- Population (2020): 60,988
- Electors (2022): 47,915
- Area (km²): 560
- Pop. density (per km²): 108.9

Parit is a federal constituency in Perak Tengah District, Perak, Malaysia, that has been represented in the Dewan Rakyat since 1959.

The federal constituency was created in the 1958 redistribution and is mandated to return a single member to the Dewan Rakyat under the first past the post voting system.

== Demographics ==
Ethnic breakdown of Parit's electorate as of 2022
1. Malay (93.6%)
2. Indian (2.80%)
3. Chinese (2.00%)
4. Other ethnicities (1.50%)

As of 2020, Parit has a population of 60,988 people.

Age breakdown of Parit's electorate as of 2022
1. 18–20 (6.01%)
2. 21–29 (21.2%)
3. 30–39 (22.5%)
4. 40–49 (16.9%)
5. 50–59 (14.7%)
6. 60–69 (11.1%)
7. 70–79 (4.96%)
8. 80–89 (2.25%)
9. above 90 (0.39%)
Gender breakdown of Parit's electorate as of 2022
1. Male (49.6%)
2. Female (50.4%)

== History ==
=== Polling districts ===
According to the federal gazette issued on 31 October 2022, the Parit constituency is divided into 37 polling districts.

State constituency	Polling Districts	Code	Location
Belanja (N39)	Buloh Akar	069/39/01	SK Simpang Tiga
Belanja (N39)	Chopin Kiri	069/39/02	SK Telok Perang
Belanja (N39)	Chopin Kanan	069/39/03	SK Chopin
Belanja (N39)	Kampong Prah	069/39/04	SK Sungai Perah
Belanja (N39)	Kampong Tepus	069/39/05	SK Tepus
Belanja (N39)	Tanjong Belanja	069/39/06	SK Tanjong Belanja
Belanja (N39)	Serapoh	069/39/07	SJK (T) Ladang Serapoh
Belanja (N39)	Kampong Nyior	069/39/08	Dewan Orang Ramai Kampong Nyior, Tanjung Belanja
Belanja (N39)	Kampong Tua Belanja Kiri	069/39/09	Dewan Serbaguna Kg Tua Mukim Blanja Parit
Belanja (N39)	Belanja Kanan	069/39/10	Dewan Orang Ramai Kg Blanja Kanan
Belanja (N39)	Ladang Glenealy	069/39/11	SJK (T) Ladang Glenealy
Belanja (N39)	Parit Utara	069/39/12	SJK (C) Chung Hwa
Belanja (N39)	Parit Selatan	069/39/13	SK Iskandar Shah
Belanja (N39)	Belanja Kiri	069/39/14	SK Belanja
Belanja (N39)	Pasir Gajah	069/39/15	SK Pasir Gajah
Belanja (N39)	Tanjong Medan	069/39/16	SA Rakyat Nadwah Al Tullab
Belanja (N39)	Kampong Paloh	069/39/17	SMK Layang-Layang Kiri
Belanja (N39)	Kampong Dusun	069/39/18	SMK Layang-Layang Kiri
Belanja (N39)	Kampong Selboh	069/39/19	SK Bukit Chupak
Belanja (N39)	Kampong Kepala Pulau	069/39/20	SK Layang-Layang Kanan
Belanja (N39)	Layang-Layang Kanan	069/39/21	SK Layang-Layang Kanan
Bota (N40)	Titi Gantong	069/40/01	SMK Seri Londong
Bota (N40)	Kampong Aji	069/40/02	SK Bota Kiri
Bota (N40)	Kompleks Pertanian	069/40/03	Kompleks Pertanian Titi Gantong
Bota (N40)	Bota Kiri	069/40/04	SRA Rakyat Al-Husainiah
Bota (N40)	Telok Kepayang	069/40/05	SK Teluk Kepayang
Bota (N40)	Kampong Bakong	069/40/06	SK Bakong
Bota (N40)	Lambor Kiri	069/40/07	SK Lambor Kiri
Bota (N40)	Padang Tenggala	069/40/08	SK Cikgu Mior Shahruddin
Bota (N40)	Seri Iskandar	069/40/09	SMK Seri Iskandar; SK Iskandar Perdana; SK FELCRA Nasaruddin; SRA Rakyat ASY-Syakirin; SRA Rakyat Riyadus Solihin
Bota (N40)	Kampong Selat	069/40/10	SMK Dato' Abdul Rahman Yaakub
Bota (N40)	Bota Kanan	069/40/11	SK Bota Kanan
Bota (N40)	Suak Padi	069/40/12	SK Suak Padi
Bota (N40)	Padang Changkat	069/40/13	SK Padang Changkat
Bota (N40)	Telok Bakong	069/40/14	SK Telok Bakong
Bota (N40)	Kampong Tua	069/40/15	Dewan Orang Ramai Batu 16 Lambor Kanan
Bota (N40)	Lambor Kanan	069/40/16	SMK Sultan Muzafar Shah 1

=== Representation history ===
Members of Parliament for Parit
Parliament	No	Years	Member	Party	Vote Share
Constituency created from Sungei Perak Hilir
Parliament of the Federation of Malaya
1st	P048	1959–1963	Hussein Mohd Noordin (حسين محمد نوردين)	Alliance (UMNO)	8,988; 59.97%
Parliament of Malaysia
1st	P048	1963–1964	Hussein Mohd Noordin (حسين محمد نوردين)	Alliance (UMNO)	8,988; 59.97%
2nd	P048	1964–1969	Hussein Mohd Noordin (حسين محمد نوردين)	Alliance (UMNO)	10,571; 59.74%
		1969–1971	Parliament was suspended		
3rd	P048	1971–1973	Hashim Gera (هاشم ڬرا)	PMIP	9,143; 51.43%
3rd	P048	1973–1974	Hashim Gera (هاشم ڬرا)	BN (PMIP)	9,143; 51.43%
4th	P057	1974–1978	Mohd. Bakri Abdul Rais (محمد بكري عبدالرئيس)	BN (UMNO)	11,884; 54.00%
5th	P057	1978–1982	Mohd. Bakri Abdul Rais (محمد بكري عبدالرئيس)	BN (UMNO)	12,268; 50.56%
6th	P057	1982–1986	Ahamed Hambal Yeop Majlis (أحمد حمبل يوڤ مجليس)	BN (UMNO)	16,020; 64.66%
7th	P063	1986–1990	Nasruddin Alang Saidin (نصرالدين ألڠ سعيدين)	BN (UMNO)	13,053; 58.24%
8th	P063	1990–1995	Nasruddin Alang Saidin (نصرالدين ألڠ سعيدين)	BN (UMNO)	14,583; 62.30%
9th	P066	1995–1999	Ainon Khairiyah Mohd. Abas (عينون خيرييه محمد عباس)	BN (UMNO)	14,207; 68.17%
10th	P066	1999–2004	Mat Basir Rahmat (مت بصير رحمات)	BA (PAS)	12,003; 52.85%
11th	P069	2004–2008	Nasarudin Hashim (نصرالدين هاشم)	BN (UMNO)	12,808; 61.22%
12th	P069	2008–2013	Mohd Nizar Zakaria (محمد نذار زكريا)	BN (UMNO)	12,399; 56.55%
13th	P069	2013–2018	Mohd Zaim Abu Hassan (محمد زعيم أبو حسّان)	BN (UMNO)	16,253; 58.03%
14th	P069	2018–2022	Mohd Nizar Zakaria (محمد نذار زكريا)	BN (UMNO)	14,035; 48.41%
15th	P069	2022–present	Muhammad Ismi Mat Taib (محمّد إسمي مت طيب)	PN (PAS)	17,181; 45.76%

=== State constituency ===
Parliamentary constituency	State constituency						
Parliamentary constituency	1955–1959*	1959–1974	1974–1986	1986–1995	1995–2004	2004–2018	2018–present
Parit			Belanja				
Parit		Blanja					
Parit			Bota				
Parit		Kampong Gajah					

=== Historical boundaries ===
State Constituency	Area					
State Constituency	1959	1974	1984	1994	2003	2018
Belanja	Kampung Pasir Gajah; Layang-Layang; Parit; Pusing; Tanjung Belanja	Kampung Pasir Gajah; Layang-Layang; Parit; Taman Seri Ara; Tanjung Belanja	Bota; Kampung Pasir Gajah; Layang-Layang; Parit; Tanjung Belanja		Kampung Chopin Kanan; Kampung Pasir Gajah; Layang-Layang; Parit; Tanjung Belanja	
Bota		Bota; Lambor; Seri Iskandar; Titi Gantung; Tronoh Mines	Kampung Baru Nalla; Lambor; Seri Iskandar; Titi Gantung; Tronoh Mines		Bota; Lambor; Padang Changkat; Seri Iskandar; Titi Gantung	
Kampung Gajah	Kampung Gajah; Kampung Setia; Kota Setia; Pulau Tiga; Sungai Durian					

=== Current state assembly members ===
No.	State Constituency	Member	Coalition (Party)
N39	Belanja	Khairudin Abu Hanipah	BN (UMNO)
N40	Bota	Najihatussalehah Ahmad	PN (PAS)

=== Local governments & postcodes ===
No.	State Constituency	Local Government	Postcode
N39	Belanja	Perak Tengah District Council	32600 Bota; 32610 Seri Iskandar; 32700 Beruas; 32800 Parit; 32900 Lambor Kanan
N40	Bota	Perak Tengah District Council	32600 Bota; 32610 Seri Iskandar; 32700 Beruas; 32800 Parit; 32900 Lambor Kanan

== Election results ==
Malaysian general election, 2022
Party	Candidate	Votes	%	∆%
PN	Muhammad Ismi Mat Taib	17,181	45.76	▲45.76
BN	Mohd Nizar Zakaria	15,026	40.02	▼8.39
PH	Nurthaqaffah Nordin	5,063	13.49	▲13.49
PEJUANG	Faizol Fadzli Mohamed	275	0.73	▲0.73
Total valid votes		37,545	100.00	
Total rejected ballots		1,124		
Unreturned ballots		186		
Turnout		38,855	78.36	▼3.92
Registered electors		47,915		
Majority		2,155	5.74	▼16.08
PN gain from BN		Swing		?
Source(s) https://lom.agc.gov.my/ilims/upload/portal/akta/outputp/1753277/PUB610%20PARLIMEN%20PERAK.pdf

Malaysian general election, 2018
Party	Candidate	Votes	%	∆%
BN	Mohd Nizar Zakaria	14,035	48.41	▼9.62
PAS	Najihatussalehah Ahmad	7,715	26.61	▼15.36
PKR	Ahmad Tarmizi Mohd Jam	7,240	24.97	▲24.97
Total valid votes		28,990	100.00	
Total rejected ballots		425		
Unreturned ballots		132		
Turnout		29,547	82.28	▼3.12
Registered electors		35,910		
Majority		6,320	21.80	▲5.74
BN hold		Swing		
Source(s) "His Majesty's Government Gazette - Notice of Contested Election, Parliament for the State of Perak [P.U. (B) 237/2018]" (PDF). Attorney General's Chambers of Malaysia. 3 May 2018. "Federal Government Gazette - Results of Contested Election and Statements of the Poll after the Official Addition of Votes, Parliamentary Constituencies for the State of Perak [P.U. (B) 311/2018]" (PDF). Attorney General's Chambers of Malaysia. 28 May 2018.

Malaysian general election, 2013
Party	Candidate	Votes	%	∆%
BN	Mohd Zaim Abu Hassan	16,253	58.03	▲1.48
PAS	Muhammad Ismi Mat Taib	11,756	41.97	▼1.48
Total valid votes		28,009	100.00	
Total rejected ballots		532		
Unreturned ballots		72		
Turnout		28,613	85.40	▲7.10
Registered electors		33,503		
Majority		4,497	16.06	▲2.96
BN hold		Swing		
Source(s) "Federal Government Gazette - Notice of Contested Election, Parliament for the State of Perak [P.U. (B) 174/2013]" (PDF). Attorney General's Chambers of Malaysia. 26 April 2013. Archived from the original (PDF) on 29 December 2019. "Federal Government Gazette - Results of Contested Election and Statements of the Poll after the Official Addition of Votes, Parliamentary Constituencies for the State of Perak [P.U. (B) 215/2013]" (PDF). Attorney General's Chambers of Malaysia. 22 May 2013.

Malaysian general election, 2008
Party	Candidate	Votes	%	∆%
BN	Mohd Nizar Zakaria	12,399	56.55	▼4.67
PAS	Najihatussalehah Ahmad	9,526	43.45	▲4.67
Total valid votes		21,925	100.00	
Total rejected ballots		628		
Unreturned ballots		45		
Turnout		22,598	78.30	▲3.84
Registered electors		28,859		
Majority		2,873	13.10	▼9.34
BN hold		Swing		

Malaysian general election, 2004
Party	Candidate	Votes	%	∆%
BN	Nasarudin Hashim	12,808	61.22	▲14.07
PAS	Muhammad Ismi Mat Taib	8,112	38.78	▼14.07
Total valid votes		20,920	100.00	
Total rejected ballots		483		
Unreturned ballots		129		
Turnout		21,532	74.46	▲9.22
Registered electors		28,917		
Majority		4,696	22.44	▲16.74
BN gain from PAS		Swing		?

Malaysian general election, 1999
Party	Candidate	Votes	%	∆%
PAS	Mat Basir Rahmat	12,003	52.85	▲21.02
BN	Megat Junid Megat Ayub	10,710	47.15	▼21.02
Total valid votes		22,713	100.00	
Total rejected ballots		431		
Unreturned ballots		0		
Turnout		23,144	65.24	▲0.16
Registered electors		35,475		
Majority		1,293	5.70	▼30.64
PAS gain from BN		Swing		?

Malaysian general election, 1995
Party	Candidate	Votes	%	∆%
BN	Ainon Khairiyah Mohd. Abas	14,207	68.17	▲5.87
PAS	Ahmad Subki Abd. Latif @ Subky Abd. Latif	6,634	31.83	▼5.87
Total valid votes		20,841	100.00	
Total rejected ballots		818		
Unreturned ballots		117		
Turnout		21,776	65.08	▼2.87
Registered electors		33,460		
Majority		7,573	36.34	▲11.74
BN hold		Swing		

Malaysian general election, 1990
Party	Candidate	Votes	%	∆%
BN	Nasruddin Alang Saidin	14,853	62.30	▲4.06
PAS	Abdul Kader Kahar	8,987	37.70	▼4.06
Total valid votes		23,840	100.00	
Total rejected ballots		952		
Unreturned ballots		0		
Turnout		24,792	67.95	▼0.01
Registered electors		36,484		
Majority		5,866	24.60	▲8.12
BN hold		Swing		

Malaysian general election, 1986
Party	Candidate	Votes	%	∆%
BN	Nasruddin Alang Saidin	13,053	58.24	▼6.42
PAS	Syeikh Mohd Nor Mansor	9,360	41.76	▲6.42
Total valid votes		22,413	100.00	
Total rejected ballots		702		
Unreturned ballots		0		
Turnout		23,115	67.96	▼3.65
Registered electors		34,011		
Majority		3,693	16.48	▼12.84
BN hold		Swing		

Malaysian general election, 1982
Party	Candidate	Votes	%	∆%
BN	Ahamed Hambal Yeop Majlis	16,020	64.66	▲14.10
PAS	Othman Itam Karib	8,756	35.34	▲13.34
Total valid votes		24,776	100.00	
Total rejected ballots		1,137		
Unreturned ballots		0		
Turnout		25,913	71.61	▼7.49
Registered electors		36,187		
Majority		7,264	29.32	▲6.20
BN hold		Swing		

Malaysian general election, 1978
Party	Candidate	Votes	%	∆%
BN	Mohd. Bakri Abdul Rais	12,268	50.56	▼3.44
DAP	Abas Mat Said	6,658	27.44	▼1.20
PAS	Zakaria Mohd Dehor	5,337	22.00	▲22.00
Total valid votes		24,263	100.00	
Total rejected ballots		786		
Unreturned ballots		0		
Turnout		25,049	79.10	▲1.40
Registered electors		31,667		
Majority		5,610	23.12	▼2.24
BN hold		Swing		

Malaysian general election, 1974
Party	Candidate	Votes	%	∆%
BN	Mohd. Bakri Abdul Rais	11,884	54.00	▲54.00
DAP	Mohamed Salleh Nakhoda Itam	6,304	28.64	▲28.64
Independent	Mahmud Zainal Abidin	3,509	15.94	▲15.94
PEKEMAS	Mohamed Dahan Katib	311	1.41	▲1.41
Total valid votes		22,008	100.00	
Total rejected ballots		720		
Unreturned ballots		0		
Turnout		22,728	77.70	▲3.26
Registered electors		29,250		
Majority		5,580	25.36	▲22.50
BN gain from Malayan Islamic Party		Swing		?

Malaysian general election, 1969
Party	Candidate	Votes	%	∆%
PMIP	Hashim Gera	9,193	51.43	▲22.80
Alliance	Hussein Mohd Noordin	8,683	48.57	▼11.17
Total valid votes		17,876	100.00	
Total rejected ballots		933		
Unreturned ballots		0		
Turnout		18,809	74.44	▼6.87
Registered electors		25,268		
Majority		510	2.86	▼28.25
PMIP gain from Alliance		Swing		?

Malaysian general election, 1964
Party	Candidate	Votes	%	∆%
Alliance	Hussein Mohd Noordin	10,571	59.74	▼0.23
PMIP	Mohd Hanifah Abdul Ghani	5,066	28.63	▼11.40
UDP	Zainal Abidin Abas	1,138	6.43	▼6.43
Independent	Mohamed Sulaiman	920	5.20	▼5.20
Total valid votes		17,695	100.00	
Total rejected ballots		433		
Unreturned ballots		0		
Turnout		18,128	81.31	▼1.67
Registered electors		22,296		
Majority		5,505	31.11	▲11.17
Alliance hold		Swing		

Malayan general election, 1959
Party	Candidate	Votes	%
Alliance	Hussein Mohd Noordin	8,998	59.97
PMIP	Osman Budin	6,007	40.03
Total valid votes		15,005	100.00
Total rejected ballots		82	
Unreturned ballots		0	
Turnout		15,087	79.64
Registered electors		18,945	
Majority		2,991	19.94
This was a new constituency created.
