= Khairul Shahril Mohamed =

Malaysian politician

- خير الشهريل بن محمد

Member of the Perak State Executive Councill (Youth, Sports, Communication and Multimedia)
- In office 10 December 2020 – 21 November 2022
- Monarch: Nazrin Shah
- Menteri Besar: Saarani Mohammad
- Preceded by: Himself
- Succeeded by: Khairudin Abu Hanipah (Youth & Sports); Mohd Azlan Helmi (Communication & Multimedia)
- Constituency: Bota
- In office 12 May 2020 – 5 December 2020
- Monarch: Nazrin Shah
- Menteri Besar: Ahmad Faizal Azumu
- Preceded by: Howard Lee Chuan How (Youth and Sports); Hasnul Zulkarnain Abdul Munaim (Communication and Multimedia)
- Succeeded by: Himself
- Constituency: Bota

Member of the Perak State Legislative Assembly for Bota
- In office 9 May 2018 – 19 November 2022
- Preceded by: Nasarudin Hashim (BN–UMNO)
- Succeeded by: Najihatussalehah Ahmad (PN–PAS)
- Majority: 1,822 (2018)

Personal details
- Born: Perak, Malaysia
- Citizenship: Malaysian
- Party: United Malays National Organisation (UMNO)
- Other political affiliations: Barisan Nasional (BN)
- Occupation: Politician

Khairul Shahril bin Mohamed is a Malaysian politician who served as Member of the Perak State Executive Council (EXCO) in the Perikatan Nasional (PN) and Barisan Nasional (BN) state administrations under Menteris Besar Ahmad Faizal Azumu and Saarani Mohamad from March to December 2020 and again from December 2020 to November 2022. He also served as Member of the Perak State Legislative Assembly (MLA) for Bota from May 2018 to November 2022. He is a member of the United Malays National Organisation (UMNO), a component party of the BN coalition.

== Election results ==
Perak State Legislative Assembly
Year	Constituency	Candidate	Votes	Pct	Opponent(s)	Votes	Pct	Ballots cast	Majority	Turnout
2018	N40 Bota	Khairul Shahril Mohamed (UMNO)	7,411	43.42%	Muhammad Ismi Mat Taib (PAS)	5,589	32.74%	17,409	1,822	83.00%
2018	N40 Bota	Khairul Shahril Mohamed (UMNO)	7,411	43.42%	Azrul Hakkim Azhar (BERSATU)	4,070	23.84%	17,409	1,822	83.00%
