= Mohd Zaim Abu Hassan =

Malaysian politician

Yang Berbahagia Dato' Mohd Zaim Abu Hassan DPMP PMP PPT
- محمد زعيم ابو حسن

Member of the Malaysian Parliament for Parit
- In office 5 May 2013 – 9 May 2018
- Preceded by: Mohd Nizar Zakaria (BN–UMNO)
- Succeeded by: Mohd Nizar Zakaria (BN–UMNO)
- Majority: 4,497 (2013)

Member of the Perak State Legislative Assembly for Belanja
- In office 21 March 2004 – 8 March 2008
- Preceded by: Faizol Fazli Mohamed (BA–PAS)
- Succeeded by: Mohd Nizar Zakaria (BN–UMNO)
- Majority: 3,143 (2004); 2,310 (2008)
- In office 25 April 1995 – 29 November 1999
- Preceded by: Zainab Ibrahim
- Succeeded by: Faizol Fazli Mohamed (BA–PAS)
- Majority: 4,814 (1995)

Personal details
- Born: Mohd Zaim bin Abu Hassan
- Citizenship: Malaysian
- Party: United Malays National Organisation (UMNO)
- Other political affiliations: Barisan Nasional (BN)
- Occupation: Politician

Mohd Zaim bin Abu Hassan is a Malaysian politician from UMNO. He was the Member of Parliament of Parit from 2013 to 2018 and Member of Perak State Legislative Assembly for Belanja from 1995 to 1999 and from 2004 to 2013.

== Politics ==
He was dropped as a candidate in the 2018 Malaysian general election.

== Election result ==
Perak State Legislative Assembly
Year	Constituency	Candidate	Votes	Pct	Opponent(s)	Votes	Pct	Ballots cast	Majority	Turnout
1995	N33 Belanja	Mohd Zaim Abu Hassan (UMNO)	7,765	70.24%	Abu Hassan Johor (PAS)	2,951	26.69%	11,055	4,814	66.26%
1999	N33 Belanja	Mohd Zaim Abu Hassan (UMNO)	5,852	48.42%	Faizol Fadzli Mohamed (PAS)	5,971	49.41%	12,085	119	66.89%
2004	N38 Belanja	Mohd Zaim Abu Hassan (UMNO)	6,916	63.40%	Faizol Fadzli Mohamed (PAS)	3,773	34.59%	10,909	3,143	73.59%
2008	N38 Belanja	Mohd Zaim Abu Hassan (UMNO)	6,596	59.14%	Muhammad Ismi Mat Taib (PAS)	4,286	38.43%	11,154	2,310	77.08%

Parliament of Malaysia
Year	Constituency	Candidate	Votes	Pct	Opponent(s)	Votes	Pct	Ballots cast	Majority	Turnout
2013	P069 Parit	Mohd Zaim Abu Hassan (UMNO)	16,253	58.03%	Muhammad Ismi Mat Taib (PAS)	11,756	41.97%	28,613	4,497	85.40%

== Honours ==
- Perak
  - Knight Commander of the Order of the Perak State Crown (DPMP) – Dato' (1997)
  - Commander of the Order of the Perak State Crown (PMP) (1992)
  - Recipient of the Distinguished Conduct Medal (PPT) (1985)
