= Asmuni Awi =

Malaysian politician

Yang Berbahagia Dato' Asmuni Awi DPMP
- أسموني أوي

Member of the Perak State Executive Council
- In office 19 May 2018 – 10 March 2020
- Monarch: Nazrin Shah
- Menteri Besar: Ahmad Faizal Azumu
- Portfolio: Islamic Affairs and Education, Industry, Rural and Entrepreneur Development
- Preceded by: Mohd Nizar Zakaria (Islamic Affairs and Education); Mohamad Zahir Abdul Khalid (Industry); Saarani Mohamad (Rural); Samsudin Abu Hassan (Entrepreneur Development)
- Succeeded by: Mohd Akmal Kamaruddin (Islamic Affairs and Education); Saarani Mohamad (Rural and Entrepreneur Development); Shahrul Zaman Yahya (Industry)
- Constituency: Manjoi

Member of the Perak State Legislative Assembly for Manjoi
- In office 9 May 2018 – 19 November 2022
- Preceded by: Mohamad Ziad Mohamed Zainal Abidin (BN–UMNO)
- Succeeded by: Mohd Hafez Sabri (PN–PAS)
- Majority: 3,532 (2018)

Personal details
- Born: Asmuni bin Awi; 16 November 1962 (age 63) Ipoh, Perak, Federation of Malaya (now Malaysia)
- Party: Malaysian Islamic Party (PAS) (–2015); National Trust Party (AMANAH) (since 2015)
- Other political affiliations: Barisan Alternatif (BA) (1999–2004); Pakatan Rakyat (PR) (2008–2015); Pakatan Harapan (PH) (since 2015)
- Children: 3
- Education: Universiti Malaya; Sekolah Izzuddin Shah
- Occupation: Politician

Asmuni bin Awi (born 16 November 1962) is a Malaysian politician who served as Member of the Perak State Executive Council (EXCO) under former Menteri Besar Ahmad Faizal Azumu from May 2018 to the collapse of the PH state administration in March 2020 and Member of the Perak State Legislative Assembly (MLA) for Manjoi from May 2018 to November 2022. He is a member and was the State Chairman of Perak of the National Trust Party (AMANAH), a component of the PH coalition and was a member of the Malaysian Islamic Party (PAS), a component party of formerly the Pakatan Rakyat (PR) and Barisan Alternatif (BA) coalitions.

== Election results ==
Parliament of Malaysia
Year	Constituency	Candidate	Votes	Pct	Opponent(s)	Votes	Pct	Ballots cast	Majority	Turnout
1999	P067 Kuala Kangsar	Asmuni Awi (PAS)	9,300	43.51%	Rafidah Aziz (UMNO)	12,074	56.49%	21,886	2,774	64.69%

Perak State Legislative Assembly
Year	Constituency	Candidate	Votes	Pct	Opponent(s)	Votes	Pct	Ballots cast	Majority	Turnout
2004	N35 Manong	Asmuni Awi (PAS)	3,312	34.19%	Ramly Zahari (UMNO)	6,374	65.81%	9,893	3,062	70.97%
2013	N23 Manjoi	Asmuni Awi (PAS)	21,379	49.85%	Mohamad Ziad Mohamed Zainal Abidin (UMNO)	21,511	50.15%	43,588	132	85.70%
2018	N23 Manjoi	Asmuni Awi (AMANAH)	20,052	42.30%	Mohamad Ziad Mohamed Zainal Abidin (UMNO)	16,520	34.85%	48,194	3,532	83.40%
2018	N23 Manjoi	Asmuni Awi (AMANAH)	20,052	42.30%	Mohd Hafez Sabri (PAS)	10,830	22.85%	48,194	3,532	83.40%
2022	N23 Manjoi	Asmuni Awi (AMANAH)	23,084	34.13%	Mohd Hafez Sabri (PAS)	29,852	44.14%	69,509	6,768	79.49%
2022	N23 Manjoi	Asmuni Awi (AMANAH)	23,084	34.13%	Azizul Kama Abd Aziz (UMNO)	14,699	21.73%	69,509	6,768	79.49%

== Honours ==
- Perak
  - Knight Commander of the Order of the Perak State Crown (DPMP) – Dato' (2019)
