= Mohd Hafez Sabri =

Malaysian politician

Yang Berhormat Tuan Mohd Hafez Sabri MLA
- محمّد حافظ صبري

Member of the Perak State Legislative Assembly for Manjoi
- Incumbent
- Assumed office 19 November 2022
- Preceded by: Asmuni Awi (PH–AMANAH)
- Majority: 6,768 (2022)

Deputy Youth Chief of the Malaysian Islamic Party
- Incumbent
- Assumed office 19 October 2023
- President: Abdul Hadi Awang
- Youth Chief: Afnan Hamimi Taib Azamudden
- Preceded by: Afnan Hamimi Taib Azamudden

State Youth Chief of the Malaysian Islamic Party of Perak
- Incumbent
- Assumed office 2021
- State Commissioner: Razman Zakaria
- Preceded by: Ahmad Faisal Mohd Puait

Personal details
- Born: Mohd Hafez bin Sabri Perak
- Citizenship: Malaysia
- Party: Malaysian Islamic Party (PAS)
- Other political affiliations: Gagasan Sejahtera (GS) (2016–2020); Perikatan Nasional (PN) (2020–present)
- Children: 3
- Education: Sultan Alam Shah Islamic College
- Alma mater: University of Malaya (BA); Universiti Sains Malaysia (MA)
- Occupation: Politician
- Profession: Lecturer

Mohd Hafez bin Sabri is a Malaysian politician who served as Member of the Perak State Legislative Assembly (MLA) for Manjoi. He is a member and the Deputy Youth Chief of Malaysian Islamic Party (PAS), a component party of Perikatan Nasional (PN) and formerly Gagasan Sejahtera (GS) coalition. At the grassroots level, he is the State Youth Chief of the PAS of Perak.

== Political career ==
=== 'Green wave' statement ===
On 7 July 2023, DAP National Chairman Lim Guan Eng warned Penang voters not to allow the "green wave" to take hold in the state. He said that the "green wave" would have resulted in the destruction of Buddhist temples and the restriction of certain practices for non-Muslims.

He has been accused by opposition leaders of fearmongering Penang voters against the Malaysian Islamic Party (PAS) by intentionally raising the 3R issues (Rulers, race, religion). PAS Secretary-General Takiyuddin Hassan said the party strongly condemned the extreme provocation and incitement of extraordinary hatred by Lim. Manjoi assemblyman Mohd Hafez Sabri wants the police to investigate Lim for his remarks.

== Election results ==
Perak State Legislative Assembly
Year	Constituency	Candidate	Votes	Pct	Opponent(s)	Votes	Pct	Ballots cast	Majority	Turnout
2018	N23 Manjoi	Mohd Hafez Sabri (PAS)	10,830	22.85%	Asmuni Awi (AMANAH)	20,052	42.30%	48,194	3,532	83.40%
2018	N23 Manjoi	Mohd Hafez Sabri (PAS)	10,830	22.85%	Mohamad Ziad Mohamed Zainal Abidin (UMNO)	16,520	34.85%	48,194	3,532	83.40%
2022	N23 Manjoi	Mohd Hafez Sabri (PAS)	29,852	44.14%	Asmuni Awi (AMANAH)	23,084	34.13%	69,509	6,768	79.49%
2022	N23 Manjoi	Mohd Hafez Sabri (PAS)	29,852	44.14%	Azizul Kama Abd Aziz (UMNO)	14,699	21.73%	69,509	6,768	79.49%
