= Bota (state constituency) =

Political subdivision in Malaysia

Bota (N40)
Perak constituency

State constituency
- Legislature: Perak State Legislative Assembly
MLA
Najihatussalehah Ahmad
PN
- Constituency created: 1974
- First contested: 1974
- Last contested: 2022

Demographics
- Population (2020): 49,658
- Electors (2022): 30,148

Bota is a state constituency in Perak, Malaysia, that has been represented in the Perak State Legislative Assembly.

== Demographics ==
Ethnic breakdown of Bota's electorate as of 2022
1. Malay (96.2%)
2. Other ethnicities (3.03%)
3. Indian (0.47%)
4. Chinese (0.27%)

== History ==
=== Polling districts ===
According to the federal gazette issued on 31 October 2022, the Bota constituency is divided into 16 polling districts.

| State constituency | Polling Districts | Code | Location |
|---|---|---|---|
| Bota (N40) | Titi Gantong | 069/40/01 | SMK Seri Londong |
| Bota (N40) | Kampong Aji | 069/40/02 | SK Bota Kiri |
| Bota (N40) | Kompleks Pertanian | 069/40/03 | Kompleks Pertanian Titi Gantong |
| Bota (N40) | Bota Kiri | 069/40/04 | SRA Rakyat Al-Husainiah |
| Bota (N40) | Telok Kepayang | 069/40/05 | SK Teluk Kepayang |
| Bota (N40) | Kampong Bakong | 069/40/06 | SK Bakong |
| Bota (N40) | Lambor Kiri | 069/40/07 | SK Lambor Kiri |
| Bota (N40) | Padang Tenggala | 069/40/08 | SK Cikgu Mior Shahruddin |
| Bota (N40) | Seri Iskandar | 069/40/09 | SMK Seri Iskandar; SK Iskandar Perdana; SK FELCRA Nasaruddin; SRA Rakyat ASY-Syakirin; SRA Rakyat Riyadus Solihin |
| Bota (N40) | Kampong Selat | 069/40/10 | SMK Dato' Abdul Rahman Yaakub |
| Bota (N40) | Bota Kanan | 069/40/11 | SK Bota Kanan |
| Bota (N40) | Suak Padi | 069/40/12 | SK Suak Padi |
| Bota (N40) | Padang Changkat | 069/40/13 | SK Padang Changkat |
| Bota (N40) | Telok Bakong | 069/40/14 | SK Telok Bakong |
| Bota (N40) | Kampong Tua | 069/40/15 | Dewan Orang Ramai Batu 16 Lambor Kanan |
| Bota (N40) | Lambor Kanan | 069/40/16 | SMK Sultan Muzafar Shah 1 |

=== Representative history ===
Members of the Legislative Assembly for Bota
| Assembly | No | Years | Name | Party |
Constituency created from Blanja, Pusing and Kampong Gajah
| 4th | N28 | 1974-1978 | Abdul Latif Mat Jaim | BN (PAS) |
| 5th | N28 | 1978-1982 | Rokiah Kayat | BN (UMNO) |
| 6th | N28 | 1982-1986 | Rokiah Kayat | BN (UMNO) |
| 7th | N30 | 1986-1990 | Ahmad Hambal Yeop Majilis | BN (UMNO) |
| 8th | N30 | 1990-1995 | Ahmad Hambal Yeop Majilis | BN (UMNO) |
| 9th | N34 | 1995-1999 | Ismail Hasbollah | BN (UMNO) |
| 10th | N34 | 1999-2004 | Usaili Alias | KeADILan |
| 11th | N39 | 2004-2008 | Che' Ri Mat Daud | BN (UMNO) |
| 12th | N39 | 2008-2009 | Nasarudin Hashim | BN (UMNO) |
| 12th | N39 | 2009 | Nasarudin Hashim | PR (PKR) |
| 12th | N39 | 2009-2013 | Nasarudin Hashim | BN (UMNO) |
| 13th | N39 | 2013-2018 | Nasarudin Hashim | BN (UMNO) |
| 14th | N40 | 2018-2022 | Khairul Shahril Mohamed | BN (UMNO) |
| 15th | N40 | 2022–present | Najihatussalehah Ahmad | PN (PAS) |

== Election results ==
Perak state election, 2022
| Party | Candidate | Votes | % | ∆% |
|---|---|---|---|---|
| PN | Najihatussalehah Ahmad | 11,275 | 47.09 | ▲47.09 |
| BN | Khairul Shahril Mohamed | 9,312 | 38.89 | ▼4.53 |
| PH | Usaili Alias | 3,138 | 13.11 | ▲13.11 |
| PEJUANG | Shahril Harahab | 218 | 0.91 | ▲0.91 |
| Total valid votes | | 23,943 | 100.00 | |
| Total rejected ballots | | 350 | | |
| Unreturned ballots | | 60 | | |
| Turnout | | 24,353 | 80.78 | ▼2.26 |
| Registered electors | | 30,148 | | |
| Majority | | 1,963 | 8.20 | ▼2.48 |
| PN gain from BN | | Swing | | ? |

Perak state election, 2018
| Party | Candidate | Votes | % | ∆% |
|---|---|---|---|---|
| BN | Khairul Shahril Mohamed | 7,411 | 43.42 | ▼17.66 |
| PAS | Muhammad Ismi Mat Taib | 5,589 | 32.74 | ▲32.74 |
| PKR | Azrul Hakkim Azhar | 4,070 | 23.84 | ▼15.08 |
| Total valid votes | | 17,070 | 98.05 | |
| Total rejected ballots | | 258 | 1.48 | |
| Unreturned ballots | | 81 | 0.47 | |
| Turnout | | 17,409 | 83.04 | ▼3.16 |
| Registered electors | | 20,964 | | |
| Majority | | 1,822 | 10.68 | ▼11.48 |
| BN hold | | Swing | | |
Source(s) "RESULTS OF CONTESTED ELECTION AND STATEMENTS OF THE POLL AFTER THE OFFICIAL ADDITION OF VOTES".

Perak state election, 2013
| Party | Candidate | Votes | % | ∆% |
|---|---|---|---|---|
| BN | Nasarudin Hashim | 9,504 | 61.08 | ▲1.72 |
| PKR | Zulkifly Ibrahim | 6,056 | 38.92 | ▼1.72 |
| Total valid votes | | 15,560 | 97.60 | |
| Total rejected ballots | | 337 | 2.11 | |
| Unreturned ballots | | 45 | 0.28 | |
| Turnout | | 15,942 | 86.20 | ▲7.40 |
| Registered electors | | 18,493 | | |
| Majority | | 3,448 | 22.16 | ▲3.44 |
| BN hold | | Swing | | |
Source(s) "KEPUTUSAN PILIHAN RAYA UMUM DEWAN UNDANGAN NEGERI".

Perak state election, 2008
| Party | Candidate | Votes | % | ∆% |
|---|---|---|---|---|
| BN | Nasarudin Hashim | 6,556 | 59.36 | ▲0.99 |
| PKR | Usaili Alias | 4,488 | 40.64 | ▼0.99 |
| Total valid votes | | 11,044 | 97.41 | |
| Total rejected ballots | | 257 | 2.27 | |
| Unreturned ballots | | 37 | 0.33 | |
| Turnout | | 11,338 | 78.80 | ▲3.42 |
| Registered electors | | 14,389 | | |
| Majority | | 2,068 | 18.72 | ▲1.98 |
| BN hold | | Swing | | |
Source(s) "KEPUTUSAN PILIHAN RAYA UMUM DEWAN UNDANGAN NEGERI PERAK BAGI TAHUN 2008".

Perak state election, 2004
| Party | Candidate | Votes | % | ∆% |
|---|---|---|---|---|
| BN | Che' Ri Mohd Daud | 6,031 | 58.37 | ▲5.43 |
| PKR | Usaili Alias | 4,302 | 41.63 | ▼5.43 |
| Total valid votes | | 10,333 | 97.27 | |
| Total rejected ballots | | 210 | 1.98 | |
| Unreturned ballots | | 80 | 0.75 | |
| Turnout | | 10,623 | 75.38 | ▲11.84 |
| Registered electors | | 14,092 | | |
| Majority | | 1,729 | 16.74 | ▲10.86 |
| BN gain from PKR | | Swing | | ? |
Source(s) "KEPUTUSAN PILIHAN RAYA UMUM DEWAN UNDANGAN NEGERI PERAK BAGI TAHUN 2004".

Perak state election, 1999
| Party | Candidate | Votes | % | ∆% |
|---|---|---|---|---|
| PKR | Usaili Alias | 5,679 | 52.94 | ▲52.94 |
| BN | Ismail Hasbollah | 5,048 | 47.06 | ▼24.78 |
| Total valid votes | | 10,727 | 96.99 | |
| Total rejected ballots | | 333 | 3.01 | |
| Unreturned ballots | | 0 | 0 | |
| Turnout | | 11,060 | 63.54 | ▼0.37 |
| Registered electors | | 17,406 | | |
| Majority | | 631 | 5.88 | ▼37.80 |
| PKR gain from BN | | Swing | | ? |
Source(s) "KEPUTUSAN PILIHAN RAYA UMUM DEWAN UNDANGAN NEGERI PERAK BAGI TAHUN 1999".

Perak state election, 1995
| Party | Candidate | Votes | % | ∆% |
|---|---|---|---|---|
| BN | Ismail Hasbollah | 7,394 | 71.84 | ▲8.89 |
| PAS | Ahmad Tarmizi Mohd Jam | 2,898 | 28.16 | ▼8.89 |
| Total valid votes | | 10,292 | 96.00 | |
| Total rejected ballots | | 345 | 3.33 | |
| Unreturned ballots | | 84 | 0.78 | |
| Turnout | | 10,721 | 63.91 | ▼3.09 |
| Registered electors | | 16,776 | | |
| Majority | | 4,496 | 43.68 | ▲17.78 |
| BN hold | | Swing | | |
Source(s) "KEPUTUSAN PILIHAN RAYA UMUM DEWAN UNDANGAN NEGERI PERAK BAGI TAHUN 1995".

Perak state election, 1990
| Party | Candidate | Votes | % | ∆% |
|---|---|---|---|---|
| BN | Ahmad Hambal Yeop Majilis | 7,736 | 62.95 | ▲0.44 |
| S46 | Mustapha Hakim | 4,553 | 37.05 | ▼0.44 |
| Total valid votes | | 12,289 | 96.44 | |
| Total rejected ballots | | 454 | 3.56 | |
| Unreturned ballots | | 0 | 0 | |
| Turnout | | 12,743 | 67.00 | ▲0.10 |
| Registered electors | | 19,018 | | |
| Majority | | 3,183 | 25.90 | ▼1.62 |
| BN hold | | Swing | | |
Source(s) "KEPUTUSAN PILIHAN RAYA UMUM DEWAN UNDANGAN NEGERI PERAK BAGI TAHUN 1990".

Perak state election, 1986
| Party | Candidate | Votes | % | ∆% |
|---|---|---|---|---|
| BN | Ismail Hasbollah | 7,186 | 62.51 | ▲0.65 |
| PAS | Othman Itam Karib | 4,022 | 34.99 | ▼3.15 |
| Independent | Othman Arif | 288 | 2.51 | ▲2.51 |
| Total valid votes | | 11,496 | 100.00 | |
| Total rejected ballots | | 431 | | |
| Unreturned ballots | | 0 | | |
| Turnout | | 11,927 | 66.90 | ▼6.32 |
| Registered electors | | 17,828 | | |
| Majority | | 3,164 | 27.52 | ▲3.80 |
| BN hold | | Swing | | |
Source(s) "KEPUTUSAN PILIHAN RAYA UMUM DEWAN UNDANGAN NEGERI PERAK BAGI TAHUN 1986".

Perak state election, 1982
| Party | Candidate | Votes | % | ∆% |
|---|---|---|---|---|
| BN | Rokiah Kayat | 7,943 | 61.86 | ▲14.94 |
| PAS | Othman Aris | 4,897 | 38.14 | ▲9.94 |
| Total valid votes | | 12,840 | 100.00 | |
| Total rejected ballots | | 577 | | |
| Unreturned ballots | | 0 | | |
| Turnout | | 13,417 | 73.22 | ▼5.60 |
| Registered electors | | 18,323 | | |
| Majority | | 3,046 | 23.72 | ▲5.00 |
| BN hold | | Swing | | |

Perak state election, 1978
| Party | Candidate | Votes | % | ∆% |
|---|---|---|---|---|
| BN | Rokiah Kayat | 5,577 | 46.92 | ▲46.92 |
| PAS | Mahmud Zainal Abidin | 3,352 | 28.20 | ▼23.58 |
| DAP | Ngah Mat Baki | 2,957 | 24.88 | ▲6.40 |
| Total valid votes | | 11,886 | 100.00 | |
| Total rejected ballots | | 539 | | |
| Unreturned ballots | | 0 | | |
| Turnout | | 12,425 | 78.82 | ▲3.26 |
| Registered electors | | 15,763 | | |
| Majority | | 2,225 | 18.72 | ▼6.66 |
| BN hold | | Swing | | |

Perak state election, 1974
| Party | Candidate | Votes | % |
|---|---|---|---|
| BN | Abdul Latif Mat Lapim | 5,657 | 51.79 |
| Independent | Mahmud Zainal Abidin | 2,885 | 26.41 |
| DAP | Hong Moi King | 2,019 | 18.48 |
| Independent | Mohd. Yatim Yaakub | 363 | 3.32 |
| Total valid votes | | 10,924 | 100.00 |
| Total rejected ballots | | 569 | |
| Unreturned ballots | | 0 | |
| Turnout | | 11,493 | 75.57 |
| Registered electors | | 15,209 | |
| Majority | | 2,772 | 25.38 |
This was a new constituency created.
