= Khairul Azwan Harun =

Malaysian politician (born 1976)

- خيرالعزوان بن هارون
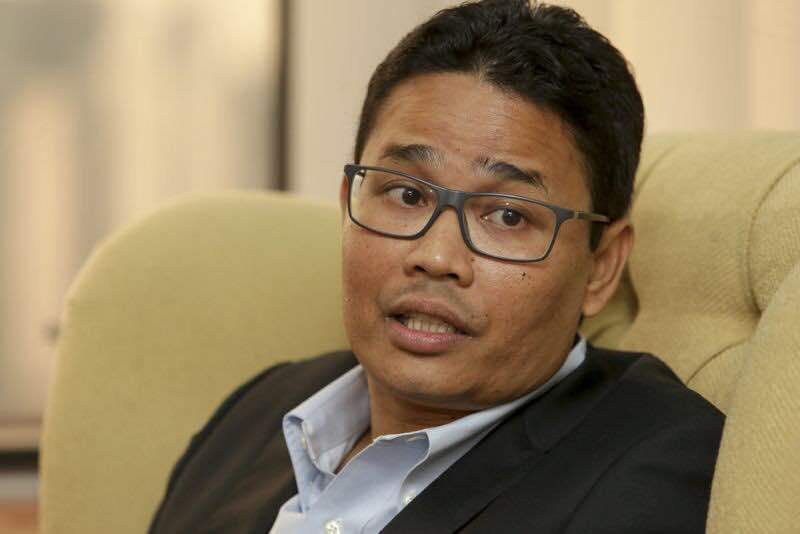

Vice Youth Chief of the United Malays National Organization
- In office 23 October 2013 – 24 June 2018
- Preceded by: Razali Ibrahim
- Succeeded by: Shahril Sufian Hamdan

Senator
- In office 7 December 2016 – 6 December 2019
- Monarchs: Muhammad V (2016–2018); Abdullah (2018-2019)
- Prime Minister: Najib Razak (2016–2018); Mahathir Mohamad (2018–2019)

Personal details
- Born: Khairul Azwan bin Harun; 19 October 1976 (age 49) Pasir Salak, Perak, Malaysia
- Party: United Malays National Organisation (UMNO)
- Other political affiliations: Barisan Nasional (BN); Perikatan Nasional (PN); Muafakat Nasional (MN)
- Children: 4
- Education: Cardiff University (BAcc); Open University Malaysia (MM)
- Occupation: Politician
- Profession: Accountant

Khairul Azwan bin Harun (Jawi: خيرالعزوان بن هارون, Malay pronunciation: [khairul azwan]; born 19 October 1976), more commonly known as Azwanbro, is a Malaysian politician. He is a former Malaysian Senator who is part of the Dewan Negara. He is a member of the United Malays National Organisation (UMNO), a major party in the Barisan Nasional (BN) coalition.

He was formerly the Vice Youth Chief of UMNO and a member of the UMNO Supreme Council. He won the post in the national party election with Khairy Jamaluddin, who won the post of National Leader of UMNO Youth Wing. Prior to this, Azwan was the Leader of Barisan Nasional Perak Youth, the youth organisation of Malaysia's governing coalition, and the Head of the Perak State UMNO Youth Wing. At UMNO's grassroots level, he has held the post of Youth Chief and is currently the Division Chief of UMNO Pasir Salak.

Azwan has expressed support for youth-related initiatives in Malaysia, such as promoting English-medium schools and interfaith dialogue. He was the chairman of Kuala Lumpur International Youth Discourse (KLIYD) for two consecutive years.

== Early life and education ==
Azwan had his tertiary education at the International Islamic University Matriculation Kuala Lumpur, and his university education at Cardiff University and Open University Malaysia in Kuala Lumpur. While at Cardiff, he graduated with a Bachelor's degree in Accounting in 1999. In 2007, he completed his Master's degree in Management at Open University Malaysia. Azwan also successfully completed the Leaders in Development Executive Course from Harvard Kennedy School, U.S. in 2014.

== Career ==
Azwan started his career in 1999 with Ernst & Young, chartered accountants at Kuala Lumpur Office and held senior positions in Business Assurance and Corporate Recovery divisions. He was involved in Ernst & Young corporate advisory assignments at several public listed companies and GLCs. He joined Perak State Government in 2004 and was appointed as CEO of Yayasan Bina Upaya Darul Ridzuan (YBUDR), a state charity foundation, in 2010 and served until 2011. He is also an adjunct Lecturer of Management and Leadership at PETRONAS University of Technology.

Azwan served as Chief of Staff at Perak Chief Minister's Office in 2009 until January 2010. After having served YBUDR as its founding CEO, Azwan built his own corporate flagship, namely Great Colour Group, and focused growth of his group's business interests in energy, marine engineering, pharmaceuticals and ICT.

In sports, Azwan was the Deputy President of Perak Football Association and was Perak State Super League Team Manager from 2011 until 2013.

== Political views ==
Azwan has expressed support for the principle of Wasattiyah aligning with policies promoted by Prime Minister Najib Razak. He has been vocal in championing issues pertinent to the Malaysian youth. In recent years, Azwan has urged for greater efforts to upskill convicted drug addicts to ensure they can integrate back into society. Azwan has voiced his concern on issues of religious extremism, climate change, sustainable energy and the need to prepare the youth for the jobs of the future.

Azwan urges youth to be attentive to the politics governing their nation. In an article in the New Straits Times, Azwan said:

"For as much as you can express your wants and opinions, you must also listen to others and follow the traditions set to make sure everyone gets a fair chance. Frustrations of not seeing your particular ideals met should not warrant you to burn the bridge of this vital cooperation. What the youth must comprehend and actually guard against is the wrong perception that supporting your party president equates to yes-manning mindlessly. There are values of being a part of a party, values of loyalty and the sincerity of respect to leaders."

Azwan opposed Mahathir Mohamad’s role as Malaysia's opposition leader, citing concerns over his approach to modern issues. Mahathir, a former Prime Minister of Malaysia for 22 years, became opposition leader in January 2018 at age 93. Azwan argued that Mahathir's appointment could hinder the development of youth leadership in Malaysia and that someone at such an advanced age would not be able to comprehend issues such as cybersecurity, job security, climate change and modern religious extremism.

Azwan started The Kuala Lumpur International Youth Discourse (KLIYD), a platform for youth to discuss geo-political issues like sovereignty, security, the cultures and the role of religion. During the discourse, Malaysian and foreign youth had the opportunity to exchange views and opinions with Malaysian policy makers, ministers, industry experts and academician. During the inception of KLIYD, Azwan focused on empowering youth for a safer and better future. He argued that terrorism and radicalism, among the most dangerous threats, should be tackled by the government. In its second year, KLIYD emphasised the importance of total security, protection from both traditional and non-traditional threats including job security, energy and power security, cyber security and food security. The discourse has created awareness amongst youth of the importance of total security in maintaining a stable and prosperous nation. KLIYD has been held annually to provide a platform for youth discussions on geopolitical and societal issues.

Azwan was mentioned in a press conference by the Malaysian Anti-Corruption Commission on 8 January 2020 regarding audio recordings linked to the 1Malaysia Development Berhad scandal.

== Election results ==
Parliament of Malaysia
Year	Constituency	Candidate	Votes	Pct	Opponent(s)	Votes	Pct	Ballots cast	Majority	Turnout
2022	P073 Pasir Salak, Perak	Khairul Azwan Harun (UMNO)	19,894	34.89%	Jamaludin Yahya (PAS)	24,897	43.66%	58,217	5,003	76.27%
2022	P073 Pasir Salak, Perak	Khairul Azwan Harun (UMNO)	19,894	34.89%	Nik Omar Nik Abdul Aziz (PKR)	11,693	20.51%	58,217	5,003	76.27%
2022	P073 Pasir Salak, Perak	Khairul Azwan Harun (UMNO)	19,894	34.89%	Zairol Hizam Zakaria (PEJUANG)	549	0.95%	58,217	5,003	76.27%
