= Manjoi (state constituency) =

State constituency in Perak, Malaysia

Manjoi (N23)
Perak constituency

State constituency
- Legislature: Perak State Legislative Assembly
MLA
Mohd Hafez Sabri
PN
- Constituency created: 1994
- First contested: 1995
- Last contested: 2022

Demographics
- Population (2020): 145,492
- Electors (2022): 86,266

Manjoi is a state constituency in Perak, Malaysia, that has been represented in the Perak State Legislative Assembly since 1995.

The state constituency was created in the 1994 redistribution and is mandated to return a single member to the Perak State Legislative Assembly under the first past the post voting system.

== Demographics ==
Ethnic breakdown of Manjoi's electorate as of 2022
1. Malay (70.7%)
2. Chinese (16.6%)
3. Indian (11.7%)
4. Other ethnicities (0.96%)

== History ==
=== Polling districts ===
According to the gazette issued on 30 March 2018, the Manjoi constituency has a total of 18 polling districts.

State constituency	Polling District	Code	Location
Manjoi（N23）	Pekan Chemor	063/23/01	SK Haji Mahmud
Manjoi（N23）	Chemor Indah	063/23/02	Tadika Pei Ching
Manjoi（N23）	Kuala Kuang	063/23/03	SJK (C) Kuala Kuang
Manjoi（N23）	Kelabang	063/23/04	SJK (T) Klebang
Manjoi（N23）	Kampong Chepor Dalam	063/23/05	SK Seri Kelebang
Manjoi（N23）	Kampong Ulu Chepor	063/23/06	SK Chepor
Manjoi（N23）	Meru Raya	063/23/07	SK Chepor
Manjoi（N23）	Meru	063/23/08	SK Jelapang
Manjoi（N23）	Taman Jati	063/23/09	SK Jati
Manjoi（N23）	Kampong Sungai Kati	063/23/10	SMK Raja Permaisuri Bainun
Manjoi（N23）	Kampong Datok Ahmad Said; Tambahan 2 Selatan	063/23/11	SK Dato' Ahmad Said Tambahan
Manjoi（N23）	Kampong Datok Ahmad Said; Tambahan 2 Tengah	063/23/12	SK Dato' Ahmad Said Tambahan
Manjoi（N23）	Tun Terang	063/23/13	SA Rakyat Taufikiah Islamiah
Manjoi（N23）	Kampong Sungai Tapah	063/23/14	SK Manjoi (Dua)
Manjoi（N23）	Kampong Seberang Manjoi	063/23/15	SK Manjoi (Satu)
Manjoi（N23）	Kampong Tengku Hussein	063/23/16	SA Rakyat Ittihadiah
Manjoi（N23）	Taman Keledang Jaya	063/23/17	SRA Rakyat Osmaniah
Manjoi（N23）	Germuda	063/23/18	SRA Rakyat Osmaniah

=== Representation history ===
Members of the Legislative Assembly for Manjoi
Assembly	No	Years	Member	Party
Constituency created from Chemor, Tasek and Lahat
9th	N20	1995–1999	Nadzri Ismail	BN (UMNO)
10th	N20	1999–2004	Nadzri Ismail	BN (UMNO)
11th	N23	2004–2008	Nadzri Ismail	BN (UMNO)
12th	N23	2008–2013	Nadzri Ismail	BN (UMNO)
13th	N23	2013–2018	Mohamad Ziad Mohamed Zainal Abidin	BN (UMNO)
14th	N23	2018–2022	Asmuni Awi	PH (AMANAH)
15th	N23	2022–present	Mohd Hafez Sabri	PN (PAS)

== Election results ==
Perak state election, 2022
Party	Candidate	Votes	%	∆%
PN	Mohd Hafez Sabri	29,852	44.14	▲44.14
PH	Asmuni Awi	23,084	34.13	▲34.13
BN	Azizul Kama Abd Aziz	14,699	21.73	▼13.12
Total valid votes		67,635	100.00	
Total rejected ballots		759		
Unreturned ballots		178		
Turnout		68,572	79.49	▼3.87
Registered electors		86,266		
Majority		6,768	10.10	▲2.56
PN gain from PKR		Swing		?

Perak state election, 2018
Party	Candidate	Votes	%	∆%
PKR	Asmuni Awi	20,052	42.30	▲42.30
BN	Mohamad Ziad Mohamed Zainal Abidin	16,520	34.85	▼15.30
PAS	Mohd Hafez Sabri	10,830	22.47	▼27.38
Total valid votes		47,402	98.36	
Total rejected ballots		539	1.11	
Unreturned ballots		253	0.52	
Turnout		48,194	83.36	▼2.34
Registered electors		57,817		
Majority		3,532	7.45	▲7.15
PKR gain from BN		Swing		?
Source(s) "RESULTS OF CONTESTED ELECTION AND STATEMENTS OF THE POLL AFTER THE OFFICIAL ADDITION OF VOTES".

Perak state election, 2013
Party	Candidate	Votes	%	∆%
BN	Mohamad Ziad Mohamed Zainal Abidin	21,511	50.15	▼0.44
PAS	Asmuni Awi	21,379	49.85	▲0.44
Total valid votes		42,890	98.06	
Total rejected ballots		698	1.60	
Unreturned ballots		151	0.35	
Turnout		43,739	85.70	▲10.49
Registered electors		51,036		
Majority		132	0.30	▼0.88
BN hold		Swing		
Source(s) "Federal Government Gazette - Notice of Contested Election, State Legislative Assembly for the State of Perak [P.U. (B) 190/2013]" (PDF). Attorney General's Chambers of Malaysia. 26 April 2013. "Federal Government Gazette - Results of Contested Election and Statements of the Poll after the Official Addition of Votes, State Constituencies for the State of Perak [P.U. (B) 231/2013]" (PDF). Attorney General's Chambers of Malaysia. 22 May 2013.

Perak state election, 2008
Party	Candidate	Votes	%	∆%
BN	Nadzri Ismail	14,804	50.59	▼14.40
PAS	Zulkurnaini Ibrahim	14,456	49.41	▲14.40
Total valid votes		29,260	98.14	
Total rejected ballots		473	1,59	
Unreturned ballots		81	0.27	
Turnout		29,814	75.21	▲2.52
Registered electors		39,640		
Majority		348	1.18	▼28.80
BN hold		Swing		
Source(s) "KEPUTUSAN PILIHAN RAYA UMUM DEWAN UNDANGAN NEGERI PERAK BAGI TAHUN 2008".

Perak state election, 2004
Party	Candidate	Votes	%	∆%
BN	Nadzri Ismail	17,100	64.99	▲12.06
PAS	Zulkifly Ibrahim	9,210	35.01	▲35.01
Total valid votes		26,310	98.07	
Total rejected ballots		518	1.93	
Unreturned ballots		0	0.00	
Turnout		26,828	72.69	▲2.53
Registered electors		36,906		
Majority		7,890	29.98	▲24.12
BN hold		Swing		
Source(s) "KEPUTUSAN PILIHAN RAYA UMUM DEWAN UNDANGAN NEGERI PERAK BAGI TAHUN 2004".

Perak state election, 1999
Party	Candidate	Votes	%	∆%
BN	Nadzri Ismail	12,146	52.93	▼28.24
PKR	Zulkifly Ibrahim	10,803	47.07	▲47.07
Total valid votes		22,949	97.34	
Total rejected ballots		502	2.13	
Unreturned ballots		106	0.45	
Turnout		23,557	70.16	▲0.44
Registered electors		33,577		
Majority		1,343	5.86	▼56.48
BN hold		Swing		
Source(s) "KEPUTUSAN PILIHAN RAYA UMUM DEWAN UNDANGAN NEGERI PERAK BAGI TAHUN 1999".

Perak state election, 1995
Party	Candidate	Votes	%
BN	Nadzri Ismail	16,803	81.17
PAS	Zainuddin Ahmad Karim	3,897	18.83
Total valid votes		20,700	96.67
Total rejected ballots		624	2.91
Unreturned ballots		88	0.41
Turnout		21,412	69.72
Registered electors		30,710	
Majority		12,906	62.34
This was a new constituency created.
Source(s) "KEPUTUSAN PILIHAN RAYA UMUM DEWAN UNDANGAN NEGERI PERAK BAGI TAHUN 1995".
