= Jamaludin Yahya =

Malaysian politician

Yang Berhormat Tuan Jamaludin Yahya MP
- جمال الدين يحيى

Member of the Malaysian Parliament for Pasir Salak
- Incumbent
- Assumed office 19 November 2022
- Preceded by: Tajuddin Abdul Rahman (BN–UMNO)
- Majority: 5,003 (2022)

Personal details
- Born: 19 August 1971 (age 55) Kampung Kepala Pulau, Pasir Salak, Perak, Malaysia
- Party: Malaysian Islamic Party (PAS)
- Other political affiliations: Perikatan Nasional (PN)
- Education: International Islamic University Malaysia; Sekolah Izzuddin Shah

Jamaludin bin Yahya is a Malaysian politician who has served as Member of Parliament of Pasir Salak since November 2022. He is a member of Malaysian Islamic Party (PAS), a component party of Perikatan Nasional (PN).

== Election results ==
Parliament of Malaysia
| Year | Constituency | Candidate | Votes | Pct | Opponent(s) | Votes | Pct | Ballots cast | Majority | Turnout |
|---|---|---|---|---|---|---|---|---|---|---|
| 2022 | P073 Pasir Salak, Perak | Jamaludin Yahya (PAS) | 24,897 | 43.66% | Khairul Azwan Harun (UMNO) | 19,894 | 34.89% | 58,217 | 5,003 | 76.27% |
| 2022 | P073 Pasir Salak, Perak | Jamaludin Yahya (PAS) | 24,897 | 43.66% | Nik Omar Nik Abdul Aziz (AMANAH) | 11,693 | 20.51% | 58,217 | 5,003 | 76.27% |
| 2022 | P073 Pasir Salak, Perak | Jamaludin Yahya (PAS) | 24,897 | 43.66% | Zairol Hizam Zakaria (PUTRA) | 549 | 0.95% | 58,217 | 5,003 | 76.27% |

== Honours ==
=== Honours of Malaysia ===
- Malaysia
  - Recipient of the 17th Yang di-Pertuan Agong Installation Medal

== See also ==
- Pasir Salak (federal constituency)
