= Najihatussalehah Ahmad =

Malaysian politician

Yang Berhormat Najihatussalehah Ahmad MLA
- نجيحة صالحة أحمد
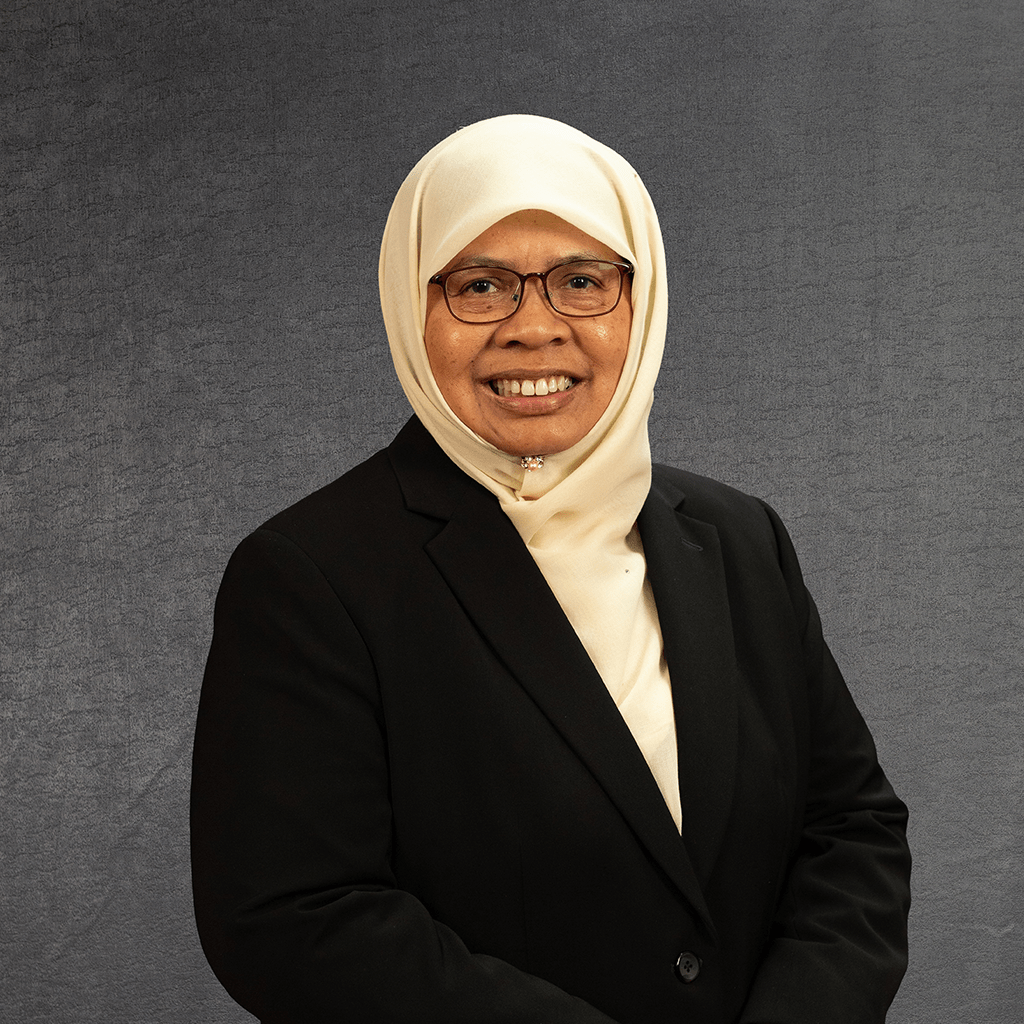

Member of the Perak State Legislative Assembly for Bota
- Incumbent
- Assumed office 19 December 2022
- Preceded by: Khairul Shahril Mohamed (BN–UMNO)
- Majority: 1,963 (2022)

Head of the Perak PAS Muslim Council
- Incumbent
- Assumed office 2013

Personal details
- Born: 15 November 1966 (age 59) Pasir Kubu, Pulau Tiga Kiri, Bota, Perak, Malaysia
- Party: Malaysian Islamic Party (PAS)
- Other political affiliations: Pakatan Rakyat (PR) (–2015); Gagasan Sejahtera (GS) (2016–2020); Perikatan Nasional (PN) (2020–present)
- Education: Universiti Malaya (MBBS)
- Occupation: Politician
- Profession: Physician

Najihatussalehah binti Ahmad (born 15 November 1966) is a Malaysian politician and physician who served as Member of the Perak State Legislative Assembly (MLA) for Bota since November 2022. She is a member of Malaysian Islamic Party (PAS), a component party of Perikatan Nasional (PN).

== Early life and education ==
Najihatussalehah was born on 15 November 1966 in Pasir Kubu, Pulau Tiga Kiri, Perak. During her childhood, she lived in Parit and Batu Gajah. In 1976, she moved to Gunung Semanggol. She received her early education at Sekolah Rendah Jenis Kebangsaan Cina Chong Wah, Gunung Semanggol, Taiping. Then she continued her secondary education at Sekolah Menengah Raja Perempuan Taayah, Ipoh from 1979 to 1981 and Sekolah Menengah Agama Wilayah Persekutuan (now SMAP Labu) from 1982 to 1983. In 1992, she successfully obtained a Bachelor of Medicine and Surgery from the University of Malaya in 1992.

== Election results ==
Parliament of Malaysia
Year	Constituency	Candidate	Votes	Pct	Opponent(s)	Votes	Pct	Ballots cast	Majority	Turnout
2008	P069 Parit	Najihatussalehah Ahmad (PAS)	9,526	43.45%	Mohd Nizar Zakaria (UMNO)	12,399	56.55%	22,598	2,873	78.30%
2016	P067 Kuala Kangsar	Najihatussalehah Ahmad (PAS)	5,684	24.42%	Mastura Mohd Yazid (UMNO)	12,653	54.37%	23,523	6,969	71.39%
2016	P067 Kuala Kangsar	Najihatussalehah Ahmad (PAS)	5,684	24.42%	Ahmad Termizi Ramli (AMANAH)	4,883	20.98%	23,523	6,969	71.39%
2016	P067 Kuala Kangsar	Najihatussalehah Ahmad (PAS)	5,684	24.42%	Izat Bukhary Ismail Bukhary (IND)	54	0.23%	23,523	6,969	71.39%
2018	P069 Parit	Najihatussalehah Ahmad (PAS)	7,715	26.61%	Mohd Nizar Zakaria (UMNO)	14,035	48.41%	29,547	6,320	82.28%
2018	P069 Parit	Najihatussalehah Ahmad (PAS)	7,715	26.61%	Ahmad Tarmizi Mohd Jam (AMANAH)	7,240	24.97%	29,547	6,320	82.28%

Perak State Legislative Assembly
Year	Constituency	Candidate	Votes	Pct	Opponent(s)	Votes	Pct	Ballots cast	Majority	Turnout
2013	N38 Belanja	Najihatussalehah Ahmad (PAS)	4,728	39.17%	Mohd Nizar Zakaria (UMNO)	7,691	60.83%	12,671	2,963	84.40%
2022	N40 Bota	Najihatussalehah Ahmad (PAS)	11,275	47.09%	Khairul Shahril Mohamed (UMNO)	9,312	38.89%	24,353	1,963	80.78%
2022	N40 Bota	Najihatussalehah Ahmad (PAS)	11,275	47.09%	Usaili Alias (PKR)	3,138	13.11%	24,353	1,963	80.78%
2022	N40 Bota	Najihatussalehah Ahmad (PAS)	11,275	47.09%	Shahril Harahab (PEJUANG)	218	0.91%	24,353	1,963	80.78%
