= Khairudin Abu Hanipah =

Malaysian politician

Yang Berhormat Dato' Khairudin Abu Hanipah DPMP AMP MLA
- خيردين ابو هانيڤه

Member of the Perak State Executive Council
- Incumbent
- Assumed office 22 November 2022
- Monarch: Nazrin Shah
- Menteri Besar: Saarani Mohamad
- Portfolio: Education, Higher Education, Youth and Sports (Note: Assumed portfolios on 23 November 2022 after taking office.)
- Preceded by: Ahmad Saidi Mohamad Daud (Education & Higher Education); Khairul Shahril Mohamed (Youth and Sports)
- Constituency: Belanja

Member of the Perak State Legislative Assembly for Belanja
- Incumbent
- Assumed office 9 May 2018
- Preceded by: Mohd Nizar Zakaria (BN–UMNO)
- Majority: 2,729 (2018); 1,223 (2022)

Personal details
- Born: Khairudin bin Abu Hanipah
- Citizenship: Malaysian
- Party: United Malays National Organisation (UMNO)
- Other political affiliations: Barisan Nasional (BN)
- Education: SMK Iskandar Shah; Sultan Idris Education University
- Occupation: Politician

Khairudin bin Abu Hanipah is a Malaysian politician who has served as Member of the Perak State Executive Council (EXCO) in the Barisan Nasional (BN) state administration under Menteri Besar Saarani Mohamad since November 2022 and Member of the Perak State Legislative Assembly (MLA) for Belanja since May 2018. He is a member of the United Malays National Organisation (UMNO), a component party of the BN coalition.

== Election results ==
Perak State Legislative Assembly
Year	Constituency	Candidate	Votes	Pct	Opponent(s)	Votes	Pct	Ballots cast	Majority	Turnout
2018	N39 Belanja	Khairudin Abu Hanipah (UMNO)	5,879	48.43%	Mohd Zahid Abu Bakar (PAS)	3,150	25.95%	12,140	2,729	81.23%
2018	N39 Belanja	Khairudin Abu Hanipah (UMNO)	5,879	48.43%	Yahanis Yahya (BERSATU)	2,871	23.65%	12,140	2,729	81.23%
2022	N39 Belanja	Khairudin Abu Hanipah (UMNO)	6,374	47.03%	Wan Meor Safwat Naqiuddin Shamsudin (BERSATU)	5,151	38.01%	13,552	1,223	76.28%
2022	N39 Belanja	Khairudin Abu Hanipah (UMNO)	6,374	47.03%	Ahmad Hishamuddin Abdullah (AMANAH)	1,881	13,88%	13,552	1,223	76.28%
2022	N39 Belanja	Khairudin Abu Hanipah (UMNO)	6,374	47.03%	Shaharuzzaman Bistamam (PEJUANG)	146	1.08%	13,552	1,223	76.28%

== Honours ==
- Perak
  - Knight Commander of the Order of the Perak State Crown (DPMP) – Dato' (2025)
  - Member of the Order of the Perak State Crown (AMP) (2015)
