= Mohd Nizar Zakaria =

Malaysian politician (born 1969)

Yang Berbahagia Dato' Mohd Nizar Zakaria DPCM AMP
- محمد نزار بن زكريا

Member of the Perak State Executive Council (Islamic Education, Attitude Development, Co-operatives and Entrepreneur Development : 18 May 2013–12 May 2014) (Islamic Affairs, Education and Attitude Development : 12 May 2014–12 May 2018)
- In office 18 May 2013 – 12 May 2018
- Monarchs: Azlan Shah (2013–2014); Nazrin Shah (2014–2018)
- Menteri Besar: Zambry Abdul Kadir
- Preceded by: Zambry Abdul Kadir (Islamic Education and Attitude Development); Hamidah Osman (Co-operatives and Entrepreneur Development)
- Succeeded by: Asmuni Awi (Islamic Affairs and Education); Wong May Ing (Attitude Development)
- Constituency: Belanja

Member of the Malaysian Parliament for Parit
- In office 9 May 2018 – 19 November 2022
- Preceded by: Mohd Zaim Abu Hassan (BN–UMNO)
- Succeeded by: Muhammad Ismi Mat Taib (PN–PAS)
- Majority: 6,320 (2018)
- In office 8 March 2008 – 5 May 2013
- Preceded by: Nasarudin Hashim (BN–UMNO)
- Succeeded by: Mohd Zaim Abu Hasan (BN–UMNO)
- Majority: 2,873 (2008)

Member of the Perak State Legislative Assembly for Belanja
- In office 5 May 2013 – 9 May 2018
- Preceded by: Mohd Zaim Abu Hasan (BN–UMNO)
- Succeeded by: Khairudin Abu Hanipah (BN–UMNO)
- Majority: 2,963 (2013)

Faction represented in Dewan Rakyat
- 2008–2013: Barisan Nasional
- 2018–2022: Barisan Nasional

Faction represented in Perak State Legislative Assembly
- 2013–2018: Barisan Nasional

Personal details
- Born: Mohd Nizar bin Zakaria; 3 January 1969 (age 57) Perak, Malaysia
- Citizenship: Malaysian
- Party: United Malays National Organisation (UMNO)
- Other political affiliations: Barisan Nasional (BN)
- Occupation: Politician

Mohd Nizar Zakaria (Jawi: محمد نزار بن زكريا; born 3 January 1969) is a Malaysian politician who served as Member of the Perak State Executive Council (EXCO) in the Barisan Nasional (BN) state administration under former Menteri Besar Zambry Abdul Kadir from May 2013 to the collapse of the BN state administration in May 2018, Member of Parliament (MP) for Parit from March 2008 to May 2013 and again from May 2018 to November 2022 and Member of the Perak State Legislative Assembly (MLA) for Belanja from May 2013 to May 2018. He is a member of the United Malays National Organisation (UMNO), a component party in of the BN coalition.

Nizar was elected to Parliament in the 2008 Malaysian general election for the UMNO held seat of Parit. In June 2010, he was a passenger on the MV Rachel Corrie when it was seized by the Israel Defense Forces while attempting to deliver supplies to Gaza.

For the 2013 Malaysian general election, Nizar left parliament to contest, and eventually won, the Perak State Legislative Assembly seat of Belanja.

== Election results ==
Perak State Legislative Assembly
Year	Constituency	Candidate	Votes	Pct	Opponent(s)	Votes	Pct	Ballots cast	Majority	Turnout
2013	N38 Belanja	Mohd Nizar Zakaria (UMNO)	7,691	60.70%	Najihatussalehah Ahmad (PAS)	4,728	37.31%	12,671	2,963	84.40%

Parliament of Malaysia
Year	Constituency	Candidate	Votes	Pct	Opponent(s)	Votes	Pct	Ballots cast	Majority	Turnout
2008	P069 Parit	Mohd Nizar Zakaria (UMNO)	12,399	56.55%	Najihatussalehah Ahmad (PAS)	9,526	43.45%	22,598	2,873	78.30%
2018	P069 Parit	Mohd Nizar Zakaria (UMNO)	14,035	48.41%	Najihatussalehah Ahmad (PAS)	7,715	26.61%	29,547	6,320	82.28%
2018	P069 Parit	Mohd Nizar Zakaria (UMNO)	14,035	48.41%	Ahmad Tarmizi Mohd Jam (AMANAH)	7,240	24.97%	29,547	6,320	82.28%
2022	P069 Parit	Mohd Nizar Zakaria (UMNO)	15,026	40.02%	Muhammad Ismi Mat Taib (PAS)	17,181	45.76%	37,545	2,155	78.36%
2022	P069 Parit	Mohd Nizar Zakaria (UMNO)	15,026	40.02%	Nurthaqaffah Nordin (AMANAH)	5,063	13.49%	37,545	2,155	78.36%
2022	P069 Parit	Mohd Nizar Zakaria (UMNO)	15,026	40.02%	Faizol Fadzli Mohamed (PEJUANG)	275	0.73%	37,545	2,155	78.36%

== Honours ==
- Perak
  - Knight Commander of the Order of Cura Si Manja Kini (DPCM) – Dato' (2014)
  - Member of the Order of the Perak State Crown (AMP) (2005)

== See also ==
- Parit (federal constituency)
