= Nasarudin Hashim =

Malaysian politician

Yang Berbahagia Dato' Nasarudin Hashim DIMP
- نصرالدين هاشم

Member of the Perak State Legislative Assembly for Bota
- In office 8 March 2008 – 9 May 2018
- Preceded by: Che'ri Md Daud (UMNO-BN)
- Succeeded by: Khairul Shahril Mohamed (UMNO-BN)

Member of the Malaysian Parliament for Parit, Perak
- In office 2004–2008
- Preceded by: Mat Basir Rahmat (PAS-BA)
- Succeeded by: Mohd Nizar Zakaria (UMNO-BN)

Personal details
- Born: Nasarudin bin Hashim; 20 July 1950 (age 75) Johor, Federation of Malaya (now Malaysia)
- Citizenship: Malaysian
- Party: United Malays National Organisation (UMNO); People's Justice Party (PKR) (from 25 January 2009 to 4 February 2009)
- Other political affiliations: Barisan Nasional (BN); Pakatan Rakyat (PR) (from 25 January 2009 to 4 February 2009)
- Occupation: Politician

Nasarudin Hashim (born 20 July 1950) is a Malaysian politician who served as the Member of Parliament (MP) for Parit from March 2004 to March 2008 and Member of the Perak State Legislative Assembly for Bota from March 2008 to May 2018. He is a member of the United Malays National Organisation (UMNO), a component party of the Barisan Nasional (BN) coalition.

As a member of the Perak State Legislative Assembly, he was known for his key role in the 2009 Perak constitutional crisis. His defection from the People's Justice Party (PKR) back to the United Malays National Organisation (UMNO)—days after he had defected the other way—helped cause the collapse of the Pakatan Rakyat (PR) government of which PKR was a component party.

Nasarudin was first elected as the MP for Parit by winning the seat in the 2004 general election, representing UMNO of Barisan Nasional (BN). He then switched to contest the Perak state seat of Bota and was elected to the state assembly in the 2008 general election. In the 2008 election, the Pakatan Rakyat (PR) coalition took power in Perak, consigning Nasarudin's UMNO to the opposition for the first time in the state's history. On 25 January 2009, Nasarudin announced his defection to PKR, thus boosting the Pakatan Rakyat's narrow majority in the assembly. He claimed it was a "brave" decision that had the support of his constituents. His move was followed by the defection of eight UMNO branches in his constituency. However, in early February, Nasarudin defected back to UMNO. Joined by three other Pakatan Rakyat MPs, the defection gave the UMNO-led Barisan Nasional coalition the numbers to return to the state government. Nasarudin said his reversal was to ensure the "stability" of the government in Perak.

== Election results ==
Parliament of Malaysia
Year	Constituency	Candidate	Votes	Pct	Opponent(s)	Votes	Pct	Ballots cast	Majority	Turnout
2004	P069 Parit	Nasarudin Hashim (UMNO)	12,808	61.22%	Muhammad Ismi Mat Taib (PAS)	8,112	38.78%	21,532	4,696	74.46%

Perak State Legislative Assembly
Year	Constituency	Candidate	Votes	Pct	Opponent(s)	Votes	Pct	Ballots cast	Majority	Turnout
2008	N39 Bota	Nasarudin Hashim (UMNO)	6,556	57.82%	Usaili Alias (PKR)	4,488	39.58%	11,338	2,068	78.80%
2013	N39 Bota	Nasarudin Hashim (UMNO)	9,504	59.62%	Zulkifly Ibrahim (PAS)	6,056	37.99%	15,942	3,448	86.20%

== Honours ==
- Pahang
  - Knight Companion of the Order of the Crown of Pahang (DIMP) – Dato' (2006)
