= Pasir Salak (federal constituency) =

Federal constituency in Perak, Malaysia

Pasir Salak (P073)
Perak constituency

Federal constituency
- Legislature: Dewan Rakyat
- MP: Jamaluddin Yahya; PN
- Constituency created: 1984
- First contested: 1986
- Last contested: 2022

Demographics
- Population (2020): 80,485
- Electors (2022): 74,761
- Area (km²): 1,064
- Pop. density (per km²): 75.6

Pasir Salak is a federal constituency in Perak Tengah District and Hilir Perak District, Perak, Malaysia, that has been represented in the Dewan Rakyat since 1986.

The federal constituency was created in the 1984 redistribution and is mandated to return a single member to the Dewan Rakyat under the first past the post voting system.

== Demographics ==
Ethnic breakdown of Pasir Salak's electorate as of 2022
1. Malay (81.7%)
2. Chinese (12.2%)
3. Indian (4.00%)
4. Other ethnicities (2.00%)
Age breakdown of Pasir Salak's electorate as of 2022
1. 18–20 (6.04%)
2. 21–29 (21.2%)
3. 30–39 (23.5%)
4. 40–49 (17.8%)
5. 50–59 (13.8%)
6. 60–69 (9.72%)
7. 70–79 (5.64%)
8. 80–89 (1.84%)
9. above 90 (0.39%)
Gender breakdown of Pasir Salak's electorate as of 2022
1. Male (49.9%)
2. Female (50.1%)

== History ==
=== Polling districts ===
According to the federal gazette issued on 31 October 2022, the Pasir Salak constituency is divided into 53 polling districts.

State constituency	Polling Districts	Code	Location
Sungai Manik (N49)	Labu Kubong	073/49/01	SK Permatang Pelandok
Sungai Manik (N49)	Kunci Ayer Empat	073/49/02	SK Sungai Tungku
Sungai Manik (N49)	Chenderong Balai	073/49/03	SK Dato' Yahya Subban
Sungai Manik (N49)	Simpang Empat Balai Polis	073/49/04	SMK Sultan Abdullah
Sungai Manik (N49)	Kampong SC	073/49/05	SA Rakyat Al-Islahiyah Simpang Tiga, Kampong SC Lama Belt
Sungai Manik (N49)	Headworks	073/49/06	Pusat Latihan Pertanian Degong
Sungai Manik (N49)	Parit Satu	073/49/07	SK Sg Lampam
Sungai Manik (N49)	Parit 13A Sungai Lampam	073/49/08	SMK Sungai Manik
Sungai Manik (N49)	Parit 3A Sungai Tunku	073/49/09	SK Sungai Tungku
Sungai Manik (N49)	Kampong Parit 3D	073/49/10	SRA Rakyat Madrasah Saadatul Abadiah; SRA Rakyat Islamiah, Parit 3C
Sungai Manik (N49)	Permatang	073/49/11	SK Permatang
Sungai Manik (N49)	Sungai Manik	073/49/12	SK Sungai Tukang Sidin
Sungai Manik (N49)	Chikus	073/49/13	SK Chikus
Sungai Manik (N49)	Degong	073/49/14	SK Degong
Sungai Manik (N49)	Langkap	073/49/15	SK Seri Langkap
Sungai Manik (N49)	Langkap Tengah	073/49/16	SJK (C) Wah Keow
Sungai Manik (N49)	Langkap Utara	073/49/17	SMK Dato' Sago
Sungai Manik (N49)	Pelawan Timor	073/49/18	SJK (C) Pelawan
Sungai Manik (N49)	Chui Chak	073/49/19	SJK (C) Chui Chak
Sungai Manik (N49)	Kampong SC Air Hitam	073/49/20	SRA Rakyat Al-Hidayah, Kampung Ayer Hitam
Kampong Gajah (N50)	Telok Sareh	073/50/01	SK Toh Paduka Raja
Kampong Gajah (N50)	Sungai Galah	073/50/02	SK Sungai Galah
Kampong Gajah (N50)	Chenderong Kelubi	073/50/03	SK Chenderong Kelubi
Kampong Gajah (N50)	Changkat Pinggan	073/50/04	SK Sri Changkat
Kampong Gajah (N50)	Kampong Balun Bidai	073/50/05	SK Balun Bidai
Kampong Gajah (N50)	Kampong Setia	073/50/06	SK Dato' Sagor
Kampong Gajah (N50)	Pulau Tiga	073/50/07	SK Raja Chulan
Kampong Gajah (N50)	Kampong Pasir Garam	073/50/08	SK Pasir Kubu
Kampong Gajah (N50)	Kampong Paloh Pachat	073/50/09	SK Pulau Tiga Kiri
Kampong Gajah (N50)	Tanjong Bidara	073/50/10	SK Tanjong Bidara
Kampong Gajah (N50)	Kampong Geronggong	073/50/11	SK Selat Pulau
Kampong Gajah (N50)	Selat Pulau	073/50/12	SK Selat Pulau
Kampong Gajah (N50)	Kampong Gajah	073/50/13	SMK Dato' Seri Maharaja Lela
Kampong Gajah (N50)	Pasir Salak	073/50/14	SK Tok Pelita
Kampong Gajah (N50)	Pasir Jeneris	073/50/15	SK Bandar Tua
Kampong Gajah (N50)	Pulau Juar	073/50/16	SK Pulau Juar
Kampong Gajah (N50)	Kampong Pulau Besar	073/50/17	SK Pasir Panjang Ulu
Kampong Gajah (N50)	Kampong Ayer Mati	073/50/18	SK Bandar
Kampong Gajah (N50)	Bandar	073/50/19	SK Bandar
Kampong Gajah (N50)	Sungai Buaya	073/50/20	SRA Rakyat Al-Tarbitul Islamiah Parit 4 Sungai Buaya
Kampong Gajah (N50)	Bukit Cawi Seberang Perak	073/50/21	SMK Sultan Abdul Jalil Shah
Kampong Gajah (N50)	Bandar Pusat Seberang Perak	073/50/22	SK Changkat Lada 2
Kampong Gajah (N50)	Kampong Sejagop	073/50/23	SA Rakyat Al Riduaniah Al Diniah, Kampong Sejagop
Kampong Gajah (N50)	Kota Setia	073/50/24	SK Kota Setia
Kampong Gajah (N50)	Kampong Sungai Ranggam	073/50/25	SK Sungai Ranggam
Kampong Gajah (N50)	Sungai Jejawi	073/50/26	SK Sungai Jejawi
Kampong Gajah (N50)	Ladang Seberang	073/50/27	SJK (T) Ladang Sabarang
Kampong Gajah (N50)	Kampong Sungai Durian	073/50/28	SK Sungai Durian
Kampong Gajah (N50)	Ladang Rubana Bahagian 2	073/50/29	SJK (T) Ladang Rubana 1
Kampong Gajah (N50)	Kampong Sungai Rubana	073/50/30	SK Sungai Rusa
Kampong Gajah (N50)	Sungai Besar	073/50/31	SK Sungai Besar
Kampong Gajah (N50)	Tanjong Kubu	073/50/32	SRA Rakyat Marta'il Ulum Tanjong Sari
Kampong Gajah (N50)	Kampong Telok Baharu	073/50/33	SK Seri Baru

=== Representation history ===
Members of Parliament for Pasir Salak
Parliament	No	Years	Member	Party
Constituency created from Lumut and Hilir Perak
7th	P067	1986–1990	Megat Junid Megat Ayub (مڬت جونيد مڬت ايوب)	BN (UMNO)
8th	P067	1990–1995	Megat Junid Megat Ayub (مڬت جونيد مڬت ايوب)	BN (UMNO)
9th	P070	1995–1999	Megat Junid Megat Ayub (مڬت جونيد مڬت ايوب)	BN (UMNO)
10th	P070	1999–2004	Ramli Ngah Talib (رملي ڠه طالب)	BN (UMNO)
11th	P073	2004–2008	Ramli Ngah Talib (رملي ڠه طالب)	BN (UMNO)
12th	P073	2008–2013	Tajuddin Abdul Rahman (تاج الدين عبدالرحمن)	BN (UMNO)
13th	P073	2013–2018	Tajuddin Abdul Rahman (تاج الدين عبدالرحمن)	BN (UMNO)
14th	P073	2018–2022	Tajuddin Abdul Rahman (تاج الدين عبدالرحمن)	BN (UMNO)
15th	P073	2022–present	Jamaludin Yahya (جمال الدين يحي)	PN (PAS)

=== State constituency ===
Parliamentary constituency	State constituency						
Parliamentary constituency	1955–1959*	1959–1974	1974–1986	1986–1995	1995–2004	2004–2018	2018–present
Pasir Salak				Kampong Gajah			
Pasir Salak				Sungai Manik			

=== Current state assembly members ===
No.	State Constituency	Member	Coalition (Party)
N49	Sungai Manik	Zainol Fadzi Paharudin	PN (WAWASAN)
N50	Kampong Gajah	Zafarulazlan Zan	PN (PAS)

=== Local governments & postcodes ===
No.	State Constituency	Local Government	Postcode
N49	Sungai Manik	Teluk Intan Municipal Council	32000 Sitiawan; 36000, 36030, 36110 Teluk Intan; 36300 Sungai Samun; 36600 Chenderong Balai; 36700 Langkap; 36750 Chikus; 36800, 36810 Kampung Gajah
N50	Kampong Gajah	Teluk Intan Municipal Council (Sungai Besar and Tanjung Kubu areas); Perak Tengah District Council	32000 Sitiawan; 36000, 36030, 36110 Teluk Intan; 36300 Sungai Samun; 36600 Chenderong Balai; 36700 Langkap; 36750 Chikus; 36800, 36810 Kampung Gajah

== Election results ==
Malaysian general election, 2022
Party	Candidate	Votes	%	∆%
PN	Jamaludin Yahya	24,897	43.66	▲43.66
BN	Khairul Azwan Harun	19,894	34.89	▼11.15
PH	Nik Omar Nik Abdul Aziz	11,693	20.51	▼7.78
GTA	Zairol Hizam Zakaria	549	0.95	▲0.95
Total valid votes		57,023	100.00	
Total rejected ballots		885		
Unreturned ballots		309		
Turnout		58,217	76.27	▲5.14
Registered electors		74,761		
Majority		5,003	8.77	▼8.98
PN gain from BN		Swing		?
Source(s) https://lom.agc.gov.my/ilims/upload/portal/akta/outputp/1753277/PUB610%20PARLIMEN%20PERAK.pdf

Malaysian general election, 2018
Party	Candidate	Votes	%	∆%
BN	Tajuddin Abdul Rahman	20,003	46.04	▼12.68
PH	Salihuddin Radin Sumadi	12,291	28.29	▲28.29
PAS	Zafarulazhan Zan	11,151	25.67	▲25.67
Total valid votes		43,445	100.00	
Total rejected ballots		895		
Unreturned ballots		168		
Turnout		44,508	81.41	▼3.12
Registered electors		54,671		
Majority		7,712	17.75	▲0.31
BN hold		Swing		
Source(s) "His Majesty's Government Gazette - Notice of Contested Election, Parliament for the State of Perak [P.U. (B) 237/2018]" (PDF). Attorney General's Chambers of Malaysia. 3 May 2018. "Federal Government Gazette - Results of Contested Election and Statements of the Poll after the Official Addition of Votes, Parliamentary Constituencies for the State of Perak [P.U. (B) 311/2018]" (PDF). Attorney General's Chambers of Malaysia. 28 May 2018.

Malaysian general election, 2013
Party	Candidate	Votes	%	∆%
BN	Tajuddin Abdul Rahman	24,875	58.72	▲4.41
PKR	Mustaffa Kamil Ayub	17,489	41.28	▼4.41
Total valid votes		42,364	100.00	
Total rejected ballots		1,008		
Unreturned ballots		161		
Turnout		43,533	84.53	▲9.33
Registered electors		51,498		
Majority		7,386	17.44	▲8.82
BN hold		Swing		
Source(s) "Federal Government Gazette - Notice of Contested Election, Parliament for the State of Perak [P.U. (B) 174/2013]" (PDF). Attorney General's Chambers of Malaysia. 26 April 2013. Archived from the original (PDF) on 29 December 2019. "Federal Government Gazette - Results of Contested Election and Statements of the Poll after the Official Addition of Votes, Parliamentary Constituencies for the State of Perak [P.U. (B) 215/2013]" (PDF). Attorney General's Chambers of Malaysia. 22 May 2013.

Malaysian general election, 2008
Party	Candidate	Votes	%	∆%
BN	Tajuddin Abdul Rahman	16,928	54.31	▼9.80
PKR	Mustaffa Kamil Ayub	14,240	45.69	▲45.69
Total valid votes		31,168	100.00	
Total rejected ballots		950		
Unreturned ballots		1		
Turnout		32,119	75.20	▲2.32
Registered electors		42,712		
Majority		2,688	8.62	▼19.60
BN hold		Swing		

Malaysian general election, 2004
Party	Candidate	Votes	%	∆%
BN	Ramli Ngah Talib	19,422	64.11	▲5.27
PAS	Muhaimin Sulam	10,875	35.89	▲35.89
Total valid votes		30,297	100.00	
Total rejected ballots		919		
Unreturned ballots		94		
Turnout		31,310	72.88	▲4.30
Registered electors		42,961		
Majority		8,547	28.22	▲10.54
BN hold		Swing		

Malaysian general election, 1999
Party	Candidate	Votes	%	∆%
BN	Ramli Ngah Talib	16,792	58.84	▼23.74
PKR	Osman Abdul Rahman	11,747	41.16	▲41.16
Total valid votes		28,539	100.00	
Total rejected ballots		1,010		
Unreturned ballots		100		
Turnout		29,649	68.58	▲2.61
Registered electors		43,232		
Majority		5,045	17.68	▼47.50
BN hold		Swing		

Malaysian general election, 1995
Party	Candidate	Votes	%	∆%
BN	Megat Junid Megat Ayub	21,690	82.58	▲7.26
PAS	Mohd Rus Jaafar	4,575	17.42	▼7.26
Total valid votes		26,265	100.00	
Total rejected ballots		1,444		
Unreturned ballots		113		
Turnout		27,822	65.97	▼4.76
Registered electors		42,173		
Majority		17,115	65.16	▲14.52
BN hold		Swing		

Malaysian general election, 1990
Party	Candidate	Votes	%	∆%
BN	Megat Junid Megat Ayub	19,787	75.32	▲0.37
PAS	Rosli Samsudin	6,485	24.68	▼0.37
Total valid votes		26,272	100.00	
Total rejected ballots		1,034		
Unreturned ballots		0		
Turnout		27,306	70.73	▲2.74
Registered electors		38,608		
Majority		13,302	50.64	▲0.74
BN hold		Swing		

Malaysian general election, 1986
Party	Candidate	Votes	%
BN	Megat Junid Megat Ayub	17,951	74.95
PAS	Ali Daud	6,001	25.05
Total valid votes		23,952	100.00
Total rejected ballots		897	
Unreturned ballots		0	
Turnout		24,849	67.99
Registered electors		36,547	
Majority		11,950	49.90
This was a new constituency created.
