= Belanja =

Electoral district in Perak, Malaysia

Belanja (N39)
Perak constituency

State constituency
- Legislature: Perak State Legislative Assembly
MLA
Khairudin Abu Hanipah
BN
- Constituency created: 1959 (as Blanja)
- First contested: 1959
- Last contested: 2022

Demographics
- Electors (2022): 17,767

Belanja is a state constituency in Perak, Malaysia, that has been represented in the Perak State Legislative Assembly.

== Demographics ==
Ethnic breakdown of Belanja's electorate as of 2022
1. Malay (85.8%)
2. Indian (5.98%)
3. Chinese (4.83%)
4. Other ethnicities (3.37%)

== History ==
=== Polling districts ===
According to the federal gazette issued on 31 October 2022, the Belanja constituency is divided into 21 polling districts.

State constituency	Polling Districts	Code	Location
Belanja (N39)	Buloh Akar	069/39/01	SK Simpang Tiga
Belanja (N39)	Chopin Kiri	069/39/02	SK Telok Perang
Belanja (N39)	Chopin Kanan	069/39/03	SK Chopin
Belanja (N39)	Kampong Prah	069/39/04	SK Sungai Perah
Belanja (N39)	Kampong Tepus	069/39/05	SK Tepus
Belanja (N39)	Tanjong Belanja	069/39/06	SK Tanjong Belanja
Belanja (N39)	Serapoh	069/39/07	SJK (T) Ladang Serapoh
Belanja (N39)	Kampong Nyior	069/39/08	Dewan Orang Ramai Kampong Nyior, Tanjung Belanja
Belanja (N39)	Kampong Tua Belanja Kiri	069/39/09	Dewan Serbaguna Kg Tua Mukim Blanja Parit
Belanja (N39)	Belanja Kanan	069/39/10	Dewan Orang Ramai Kg Blanja Kanan
Belanja (N39)	Ladang Glenealy	069/39/11	SJK (T) Ladang Glenealy
Belanja (N39)	Parit Utara	069/39/12	SJK (C) Chung Hwa
Belanja (N39)	Parit Selatan	069/39/13	SK Iskandar Shah
Belanja (N39)	Belanja Kiri	069/39/14	SK Belanja
Belanja (N39)	Pasir Gajah	069/39/15	SK Pasir Gajah
Belanja (N39)	Tanjong Medan	069/39/16	SA Rakyat Nadwah Al Tullab
Belanja (N39)	Kampong Paloh	069/39/17	SMK Layang-Layang Kiri
Belanja (N39)	Kampong Dusun	069/39/18	SMK Layang-Layang Kiri
Belanja (N39)	Kampong Selboh	069/39/19	SK Bukit Chupak
Belanja (N39)	Kampong Kepala Pulau	069/39/20	SK Layang-Layang Kanan
Belanja (N39)	Layang-Layang Kanan	069/39/21	SK Layang-Layang Kanan

=== Representation history ===
Members of the Legislative Assembly for Belanja
Assembly	No	Years	Name	Party
Constituency created
Blanja
1st	N17	1959-1964	Mohamed Haron Kulup Seman	Alliance (UMNO)
2nd	N17	1964-1969	Ahmad Alias Md Alias	Alliance (UMNO)
		1969-1971	Assembly dissolved	
3rd	N17	1969-1971	Hisan Ibrahim	Alliance (UMNO)
3rd	N17	1971-1974	Hisan Ibrahim	BN (UMNO)
Belanja
4th	N27	1974-1978	Hisan Ibrahim	BN (UMNO)
5th	N27	1978-1982	Ahmad Aziziuddin Zainal Abidin	BN (UMNO)
6th	N27	1982-1986	Ahmad Aziziuddin Zainal Abidin	BN (UMNO)
7th	N29	1986-1990	Zainab Ibrahim	BN (UMNO)
8th	N29	1990-1995	Zainab Ibrahim	BN (UMNO)
9th	N33	1995-1999	Mohamad Zaim Abu Hassan	BN (UMNO)
10th	N33	1999-2004	Faizol Fazli Mohamed	PAS
11th	N38	2004-2008	Mohamad Zaim Abu Hassan	BN (UMNO)
12th	N38	2008-2013	Mohamad Zaim Abu Hassan	BN (UMNO)
13th	N38	2013-2018	Mohd Nizar Zakaria	BN (UMNO)
14th	N39	2018-2022	Khairudin Abu Hanipah	BN (UMNO)
15th	N39	2022–present	Khairudin Abu Hanipah	BN (UMNO)

== Election results ==
Perak state election, 2022: Belanja
Party	Candidate	Votes	%	∆%
BN	Khairudin Abu Hanipah	6,374	47.03	▼2.37
PN	Wan Meor Safwat Naqiuddin Shamsudin	5,151	38.01	▲38.01
PH	Ahmad Hishamuddin Abdullah	1,881	13.88	▲13.88
PEJUANG	Shaharuzzaman Bistaman	146	1.08	▲1.08
Total valid votes		13,552	100.00	
Total rejected ballots		228		
Unreturned ballots		40		
Turnout		13,820	77.78	▼3.45
Registered electors		17,767		
Majority		1,223	9.02	▼13.91
BN hold		Swing		

Perak state election, 2018: Belanja
Party	Candidate	Votes	%	∆%
BN	Khairudin Abu Hanipah	5,879	49.40	▼11.43
PAS	Mohd Zahid Abu Bakar	3,150	26.47	▼12.70
PKR	Yahanis Yahya	2,871	24.13	▲24.13
Total valid votes		11,900	98.02	
Total rejected ballots		187	1.54	
Unreturned ballots		53	0.44	
Turnout		12,140	81.23	▼3.17
Registered electors		14,946		
Majority		2,729	22.93	▲1.27
BN hold		Swing		
Source(s) "RESULTS OF CONTESTED ELECTION AND STATEMENTS OF THE POLL AFTER THE OFFICIAL ADDITION OF VOTES".

Perak state election, 2013: Belanja
Party	Candidate	Votes	%	∆%
BN	Mohd Nizar Zakaria	7,691	60.83	▲0.22
PAS	Najihatussalehah Ahmad	4,728	39.17	▼0.22
Total valid votes		12,643	99.78	
Total rejected ballots		224	1.77	
Unreturned ballots		28	0.22	
Turnout		12,671	84.40	▲7.32
Registered electors		15,010		
Majority		2,963	21.66	▲0.44
BN hold		Swing		
Source(s) "KEPUTUSAN PILIHAN RAYA UMUM DEWAN UNDANGAN NEGERI". Archived from the original on 2021-10-16.

Perak state election, 2008: Belanja
Party	Candidate	Votes	%	∆%
BN	Mohamad Zaim Abu Hassan	6,596	60.61	▼4.09
PAS	Muhammad Ismi Mat Taib	4,286	39.39	▲4.09
Total valid votes		10,882	97.56	
Total rejected ballots		206	1.85	
Unreturned ballots		66	0.59	
Turnout		11,154	77.08	▲3.49
Registered electors		14,470		
Majority		2,310	21.22	▼8.18
BN hold		Swing		
Source(s) "KEPUTUSAN PILIHAN RAYA UMUM DEWAN UNDANGAN NEGERI PERAK BAGI TAHUN 2008".

Perak state election, 2004: Belanja
Party	Candidate	Votes	%	∆%
BN	Mohamad Zaim Abu Hassan	6,916	64.70	▲14.20
PAS	Faizol Fadzli Mohamed	3,773	35.30	▼14.20
Total valid votes		10,689	97.98	
Total rejected ballots		169	1.55	
Unreturned ballots		51	0.47	
Turnout		10,909	73.59	▲6.70
Registered electors		14,824		
Majority		3,143	29.40	▲28.40
BN gain from PAS		Swing		?
Source(s) "KEPUTUSAN PILIHAN RAYA UMUM DEWAN UNDANGAN NEGERI PERAK BAGI TAHUN 2004".

Perak state election, 1999: Belanja
Party	Candidate	Votes	%	∆%
PAS	Faizol Fadzli Mohamed	5,971	50.50	▲22.96
BN	Mohamad Zaim Abu Hassan	5,852	49.50	▼22.96
Total valid votes		11,823	97.83	
Total rejected ballots		262	2.17	
Unreturned ballots		0	0	
Turnout		12,085	66.89	▲0.63
Registered electors		18,066		
Majority		119	1.00	▼43.92
PAS gain from BN		Swing		?
Source(s) "KEPUTUSAN PILIHAN RAYA UMUM DEWAN UNDANGAN NEGERI PERAK BAGI TAHUN 1999".

Perak state election, 1995: Belanja
Party	Candidate	Votes	%	∆%
BN	Mohamad Zaim Abu Hassan	7,765	72.46	▲11.32
PAS	Abu Hassan Johor	2,951	27.54	▲27.54
Total valid votes		10,716	96.93	
Total rejected ballots		310	2.80	
Unreturned ballots		29	0.26	
Turnout		11,055	66.26	▼2.71
Registered electors		16,684		
Majority		4,814	44.92	▲22.64
BN hold		Swing		
Source(s) "KEPUTUSAN PILIHAN RAYA UMUM DEWAN UNDANGAN NEGERI PERAK BAGI TAHUN 1995".

Perak state election, 1990: Belanja
Party	Candidate	Votes	%	∆%
BN	Zainab Ibrahim	7,086	61.14	▲6.14
S46	Hisan Ibrahim	4,503	38.86	▲38.86
Total valid votes		11,589	96.19	
Total rejected ballots		458	3.80	
Unreturned ballots		0	0	
Turnout		12,047	68.97	▼0.18
Registered electors		17,466		
Majority		2,583	22.28	▲12.28
BN hold		Swing		
Source(s) "KEPUTUSAN PILIHAN RAYA UMUM DEWAN UNDANGAN NEGERI PERAK BAGI TAHUN 1990".

Perak state election, 1986: Belanja
Party	Candidate	Votes	%
BN	Zainab Ibrahim	5,950	55.00
PAS	Syeikh Mohd Nor Mansor Al-Hafiz	4,868	45.00
Total valid votes		10,818	96.67
Total rejected ballots		373	3.33
Unreturned ballots		0	0
Turnout		11,191	69.15
Registered electors		16,183	
Majority		1,082	10.00
BN hold		Swing	
Source(s) "KEPUTUSAN PILIHAN RAYA UMUM DEWAN UNDANGAN NEGERI PERAK BAGI TAHUN 1986".

Perak state election, 1982: Belanja
Party	Candidate	Votes	%	∆%
On the nomination day, Ahmad Azizuddin Zainal Abidin won uncontested.
BN	Ahmad Azizuddin Zainal Abidin			
Total valid votes				
Total rejected ballots				
Unreturned ballots				
Turnout				
Registered electors		17,864		
Majority				
BN hold		Swing		

Perak state election, 1978: Belanja
Party	Candidate	Votes	%	∆%
BN	Ahmad Azizuddin Zainal Abidin	6,178	50.75	▼8.23
DAP	Abas Mat Said	3,669	30.14	▼1.86
PAS	Hassan Shaari Alang Pintal	2,327	19.11	▲19.11
Total valid votes		12,174	100.00	
Total rejected ballots		453		
Unreturned ballots		0		
Turnout		12,627	79.40	▲0.90
Registered electors		15,904		
Majority		2,509	20.61	▼6.37
BN hold		Swing		

Perak state election, 1974: Belanja
Party	Candidate	Votes	%	∆%
BN	Hisan Ibrahim	6,375	58.97	▲58.97
DAP	Yaw Kwan Tai	3,459	32.00	▲32.00
Independent	Abdul Kadir Sohor	682	6.31	▲6.31
PEKEMAS	Mohd Daham Khatib	294	2.72	▲2.72
Total valid votes		10,810	100.00	
Total rejected ballots		423		
Unreturned ballots		0		
Turnout		11,233	78.49	▲4.12
Registered electors		14,311		
Majority		2,916	26.98	▲19.78
BN hold		Swing		-

Perak state election, 1969: Blanja
Party	Candidate	Votes	%	∆%
Alliance	Hisan Ibrahim	5,347	53.60	▼11.89
PMIP	Abdul Aziz Abdul Latif	4,629	46.40	▲20.10
Total valid votes		9,976	100.00	
Total rejected ballots		723		
Unreturned ballots		0		
Turnout		10,699	74.37	▼6.36
Registered electors		14,386		
Majority		718	7.20	▼31.99
Alliance hold		Swing		

Perak state election, 1964: Blanja
Party	Candidate	Votes	%	∆%
Alliance	Ahmad Alias Mohd. Aliff	6,530	65.49	▼0.40
PMIP	Nordin Wahab	2,623	26.31	▼5.08
Independent	Raja Shahar Shah	520	5.22	▲5.22
UDP	Abu Hassan Ibrahim	298	2.99	▲2.99
Total valid votes		9,971	100.00	
Total rejected ballots		309		
Unreturned ballots		0		
Turnout		10,280	80.74	▲3.44
Registered electors		12,733		
Majority		3,907	39.18	▲4.68
Alliance hold		Swing		

Perak state election, 1959: Blanja
Party	Candidate	Votes	%
Alliance	Mohd. Harun Kulop	5,074	65.89
PMIP	Meor Ahmad Meor Yusof	2,417	31.39
Socialist Front	Yusoof Saroh	210	2.73
Total valid votes		7,701	100.00
Total rejected ballots		94	
Unreturned ballots		0	
Turnout		7,795	77.29
Registered electors		10,085	
Majority		2,657	34.50
This was a new constituency created.
